= 2020–21 FK Pohronie season =

Pohronie
2020–21 season
- Manager: Mikuláš Radványi (until 9 October 2020); Jan Kameník (from 12 October 2020)
- Stadium: Mestský štadión (Home stadium); Štadión Vojtecha Schotterta; Štadión pod Dubňom (Temporary stadiums)
- Slovak First Football League: 9th
- Slovak Cup: Round of 16
- Top goalscorer: League: Adler Da Silva; James Weir (6 each); All: James Weir (7)
- Biggest win: 6–0 v Rača (Away, 16 September 2020, Slovak Cup)
- Biggest defeat: 1–3 v Nitra (Away, 12 September 2020, Slovak First Football League); 0–2 v Zemplín Michalovce (Away, 26 September 2020, Slovak First Football League)

The 2020–21 season was Futbalový klub Pohronie Žiar nad Hronom Dolná Ždaňa's 2nd consecutive season in the Slovak First Football League and 9th season in existence as a football club. In addition to the domestic league, Pohronie participated in this season's editions of Slovak Cup.

== Squad ==
Squad at end of season

Note: Flags indicate national team as defined under FIFA eligibility rules; some limited exceptions apply. Players may hold more than one non-FIFA nationality.

No.	Pos.	Nation	Player
1	GK	SVK	Tomáš Jenčo
2	DF	SVK	Richard Župa
3	DF	SVK	Samuel Jenat
4	DF	CIV	Willie Britto (on loan from Zürich)
5	DF	CZE	Petr Pavlík (captain)
6	DF	SVK	Andrej Štrba
7	FW	CZE	Petr Galuška
8	MF	CIV	Ismael Dao
9	FW	SUI	Adler Da Silva
10	MF	BFA	Cedric Badolo
11	FW	CZE	Ondřej Chvěja
14	MF	ENG	James Weir

No.	Pos.	Nation	Player
15	MF	SVK	Martin Adamec
17	GK	SVK	Libor Hrdlička
18	MF	SVK	Patrik Blahút
19	MF	MLI	Ladji Mallé
20	MF	FRA	Élie N'Zeyi
22	DF	SVK	Bernard Petrák
23	FW	GAM	Alieu Fadera
29	MF	FRA	David Bangala
30	GK	SVK	Samuel Dovec
32	DF	SVK	Dominik Špiriak
75	DF	FRA	Thomas Heurtaux
77	MF	SVK	Peter Mazan

== Transfers ==
=== Summer ===
In: Note: Flags indicate national team as defined under FIFA eligibility rules; some limited exceptions apply. Players may hold more than one non-FIFA nationality.

No.	Pos.	Nation	Player
—	DF	SVK	Peter Chríbik (from MŠK Žilina)
—	DF	SVK	Erik Kramár (from (Czech Republic) FC Zbrojovka Brno U19)
—	DF	SVK	Dominik Špiriak (from FC DAC 1904 Dunajská Streda)
—	DF	FRA	David Bangala (from (France) ESM Gonfreville)
—	DF	SVK	Bernard Petrák (on loan from MŠK Žilina)
TBA	FW	BDI	Bonfils-Caleb Bimenyimana (on loan from (Latvia) FK RFS)
TBA	MF	SUI	Ivan Audino (from Free agent)

Out: Note: Flags indicate national team as defined under FIFA eligibility rules; some limited exceptions apply. Players may hold more than one non-FIFA nationality.

No.	Pos.	Nation	Player
9	FW	SVK	Roland Gerebenits (loan return to MŠK Žilina II)
33	DF	BRA	Jacy (loan return to (Brazil) Capivariano)
10	FW	BIH	Ismar Tandir (loan return to (Czech Republic) Sigma Olomouc)
—	MF	SVK	Patrik Košuda (on loan to FC Košice)
—	DF	SVK	Ján Hatok (to 1. FC Tatran Prešov)
—	MF	SVK	Ján Dzúrik (to Partizán Bardejov)
—	MF	SVK	Lukáš Pelegríni (on loan to FK Sitno Banská Štiavnica)
—	MF	SVK	Patrik Abrahám (on loan to MFK Nová Baňa)
—	DF	CAN	Ryan Lindsay (Released)

=== Winter ===
In: Note: Flags indicate national team as defined under FIFA eligibility rules; some limited exceptions apply. Players may hold more than one non-FIFA nationality.

No.	Pos.	Nation	Player
—	GK	SVK	Libor Hrdlička (from (Czech Republic) MFK Karviná)
—	FW	SUI	Adler Da Silva (from Free Agent)
—	DF	FRA	Thomas Heurtaux (from Free Agent)
—	DF	CIV	Willie Britto (on loan from (Switzerland) FC Zürich)

Out: Note: Flags indicate national team as defined under FIFA eligibility rules; some limited exceptions apply. Players may hold more than one non-FIFA nationality.

No.	Pos.	Nation	Player
—	MF	SVK	Patrik Abrahám (to KFC Komárno)

== Competitions ==
=== Overview ===
Competition	First match	Last match	Starting round	Final position	Record							
Competition	First match	Last match	Starting round	Final position	Pld	W	D	L	GF	GA	GD	Win %
Slovak First Football League	8 August 2020	22 May 2021	Matchday 1	9th	32	8	14	10	38	38	+0	25.00
Slovak Cup	8 September 2020	6 April 2021	Second round	Round of 16	3	2	0	1	11	2	+9	66.67
Total					35	10	14	11	49	40	+9	28.57

Source: Competitions

=== Slovak First Football League ===
==== Regular season ====
===== League table =====
Pos	Team	Pld	W	D	L	GF	GA	GD	Pts	Qualification
7	Ružomberok	22	5	8	9	31	37	−6	23	Qualification for the relegation group
8	Nitra	22	6	4	12	21	38	−17	22	Qualification for the relegation group
9	Zemplín Michalovce	22	5	7	10	22	42	−20	22	Qualification for the relegation group
10	Sereď	22	5	7	10	22	39	−17	22	Qualification for the relegation group
11	Senica	22	5	6	11	23	40	−17	21	Qualification for the relegation group
12	Pohronie	22	3	11	8	27	32	−5	20	Qualification for the relegation group

Source: Niké liga (in Slovak)
Rules for classification: 1) Points; 2) Head-to-head points; 3) Head-to-head goal difference; 4) Head-to-head away goals scored; 5) Play-off.

===== Results summary =====
Overall								Home						Away					
Pld	W	D	L	GF	GA	GD	Pts	W	D	L	GF	GA	GD	W	D	L	GF	GA	GD
22	3	11	8	27	32	−5	20	2	5	4	18	19	−1	1	6	4	9	13	−4

Source: Worldfootball

===== Results by round =====
Round	1	2	3	4	5	6	7	8	9	10	11	12	13	14	15	16	17	18	19	20	21	22
Ground	A	H	A	H	A	A	H	A	H	A	H	H	A	H	A	H	H	A	H	A	H	A
Result	D	L	D	W	D	L	D	L	L	D	L	D	D	D	L	D	W	W	D	L	L	D
Position	6	9	9	5	6	8	9	10	12	10	11	12	12	11	12	12	10	9	8	10	11	12
Points	1	1	2	5	6	6	7	7	7	8	8	9	10	11	11	12	15	18	19	19	19	20

Source: Worldfootball
A = Away; H = Home; W = Win; D = Draw; L = Loss

===== Matches =====
8 August 2020 1	Zlaté Moravce	2–2	Pohronie	Zlaté Moravce
19:00 CEST (UTC+2)	Ďubek 18'; Kovaľ 21', (yellow card) 77'; Orávik (yellow card) 35' (yellow-red card) 55'; Moško (yellow card) 43'; Balaj (yellow card) 60'; Chren (yellow card) 70'; Grozdanovski (yellow card) 74'; Duga (yellow card) 81'; Menich (yellow card) 90'	Report	Abrahám (yellow card) 11'; Blahút (yellow card) 58'; Špiriak (yellow card) 80'; Fadera 85'; Weir 90'	Stadium: Štadión FC ViOn; Attendance: 1,361; Referee: Martin Dohál; Assistant referees: Ján Pozor, Jakub Košecký

12 August 2020 2	Pohronie	1–2	DAC Dunajská Streda	Žiar nad Hronom
19:00 CEST (UTC+2)	Chríbik (yellow card) 30'; Župa (yellow card) 54'; Badolo (yellow card) 54'; Pavlík (yellow card) 62'; Mazan 67', (yellow card) 85'; Špiriak (yellow card) 69'; Repiský (yellow card) 90'	Report	Schäfer (yellow card) 29'; Blackman (yellow card) 30'; Balić 48'; Kružliak (yellow card) 68'; Friede 90'; Jedlička (yellow card) 90'; Malý (yellow card) 90'	Stadium: Mestský štadión Attendance: 1,150; Referee: Pavel Ochotnický; Assistant referees: Peter Bednár, Pavel Jánošík

15 August 2020 3	Spartak Trnava	1–1	Pohronie	Trnava
19:00 CEST (UTC+2)	Grič (yellow card) 7'; Tumma 10'; Vlasko (yellow card) 11'	Report	Špiriak (yellow card) 53'; Bimenyimana 61'; Chríbik (yellow card) 70'	Stadium: Štadión Antona Malatinského; Attendance: 3,854; Referee: Peter Ziemba; Assistant referees: František Ferenc, Marek Galo

22 August 2020 4	Pohronie	2–1	Žilina	Žiar nad Hronom
20:00 CEST (UTC+2)	Petrák (yellow card) 8'; Weir (yellow card) 35'; Bimenyimana 36'; Fadera 61'; Špiriak (yellow card) 72'	Report	Iľko 53'; Kiwior (yellow card) 64'	Stadium: Mestský štadión Attendance: 1,150; Referee: Erik Gemzický; Assistant referees: František Ferenc, Peter Čajka

30 August 2020 5	Ružomberok	0–0	Pohronie	Ružomberok
19:00 CEST (UTC+2)	Takáč (yellow card) 62'; Čurma (yellow card) 65'; Mrva (yellow card) 90'	Report	Chríbik (yellow card) 21'; Pavlík (yellow card) 45'; Mazan (yellow card) 59'; Badolo (yellow card) 61'	Stadium: Štadión pod Čebraťom; Attendance: 1,073; Referee: Peter Ziemba; Assistant referees: Milan Štrbo, Juraj Halíček

12 September 2020 6	Nitra	3–1	Pohronie	Nitra
19:00 CEST (UTC+2)	Kolčák 22'; Fabiš (yellow card) 40'; Weir 88' (o.g.); Danek 90'	Report	Župa (yellow card) 20'; Fadera (yellow card) 31'; Mazan 65'; Chríbik (yellow card) 77'	Stadium: Štadión pod Zoborom; Attendance: 285; Referee: Michal Očenáš; Assistant referees: Branislav Hancko, Martin Borsányi

19 September 2020 7	Pohronie	2–2	Sereď	Žiar nad Hronom
19:00 CEST (UTC+2)	Pavlík 19', (yellow card) 78'; Bimenyimana 27'; Špiriak (yellow card) 42'; Chríbik (yellow card) 72'	Report	Špehar 5'; Pankarićan 16'; Duranski (yellow card) 45'; Slaninka (yellow card) 83'	Stadium: Mestský štadión Attendance: 1,000; Referee: Martin Dohál; Assistant referees: Milan Štrbo, Tomáš Straka

26 September 2020 8	Zemplín Michalovce	2–0	Pohronie	Michalovce
19:00 CEST (UTC+2)	Žofčák 15'; Trusa 52'	Report		Stadium: Mestský futbalový štadión Attendance: 366; Referee: Peter Kráľovič; Assistant referees: Martin Vitko, Pavel Jánošík

4 October 2020 9	Pohronie	1–2	Slovan Bratislava	Žiar nad Hronom
18:00 CEST (UTC+2)	Blahút 40'; Fadera (yellow card) 66'; Bimenyimana (yellow card) 67'; Mazan (yellow card) 81'; Obročník (yellow card) 82'; Župa (yellow card) 88'	Report	Ratão 27', 59'; Holman (yellow card) 68'; Greif (yellow card) 75'; Nono (yellow card) 77'	Stadium: Mestský štadión Referee: Erik Gemzický; Assistant referees: Peter Bednár, Peter Kováč

17 October 2020 10	Trenčín	1–1	Pohronie	Žilina
17:00 CEST (UTC+2)	El Mahdioui 26'; Ikoba (yellow card) 27'	Report	Obročník (yellow card) 38'; Weir 58'	Stadium: Štadión pod Dubňom; Referee: Adam Somoláni; Assistant referees: Peter Kováč, Mário Roszbeck

24 October 2020 11	Pohronie	1–2	Senica	Žiar nad Hronom
17:00 CEST (UTC+2)	Špiriak 21'; Jacko (yellow card) 70' (yellow-red card) 88'; Mazan (yellow card) 82'	Report	Šimčák (yellow card) 52'; Fotr 61'; Gallovič (yellow card) 62'; Malec 71'; Fryšták (yellow card) 82'; Addo (yellow card) 89'	Stadium: Mestský štadión Referee: Ivan Kružliak; Assistant referees: František Ferenc, Martin Borsányi

31 October 2020 12	Pohronie	2–2	Zlaté Moravce	Žiar nad Hronom
17:00 CET (UTC+1)	Fadera 21'; Chríbik (yellow card) 56'; Špiriak (yellow card) 62'; Weir 68'; Badolo (red card) 90'	Report	Kyziridis 12'; Chovan (yellow card) 31'; Duga (yellow card) 45'; Balaj 67'; Ďubek (yellow card) 87'	Stadium: Mestský štadión Referee: Michal Očenáš; Assistant referees: Tomáš Vorel, Anton Perát

7 November 2020 13	DAC Dunajská Streda	0–0	Pohronie	Dunajská Streda
17:00 CET (UTC+1)	Kružliak (yellow card) 12'; Méndez (yellow card) 45'; Sommer (yellow card) 49'; Malý (yellow card) 55'	Report	Weir (yellow card) 90'	Stadium: MOL Aréna; Referee: Ladislav Prešinský; Assistant referees: Peter Bednár, Gabriel Ádám

21 November 2020 14	Pohronie	3–3	Spartak Trnava	Žiar nad Hronom
14:00 CET (UTC+1)	Weir 17'; Petrák 69'; Rusov 80' (o.g.); Mazan (yellow card) 82'	Report	Mikovič (yellow card) 26'; Yao 51'; Vlasko 61', (yellow card) 82'; Rusov (yellow card) 81'; Savvidis 90'	Stadium: Mestský štadión Referee: Michal Smolák; Assistant referees: Gabriel Ádám, Mário Roszbeck

28 November 2020 15	Žilina	2–1	Pohronie	Žilina
14:00 CET (UTC+1)	Bernát 43'; Fazlagikj (yellow card) 60'; Ďuriš 76'	Report	Bangala (yellow card) 17'; Bimenyimana (yellow card) 37'; Pavlík (yellow card) 52'; Blahút (yellow card) 87', (goal) 89'	Stadium: Štadión pod Dubňom; Referee: Ladislav Prešinský; Assistant referees: Adam Jekkel, Jakub Košecký

5 December 2020 16	Pohronie	2–2	Ružomberok	Žiar nad Hronom
14:00 CET (UTC+1)	Weir 2'; Fadera 52'; Mazan (yellow card) 83'; Jacko (yellow card) 87'	Report	Regáli 15', 55', (yellow card) 62'; Maslo (yellow card) 30'; Takáč (yellow card) 45'; Mojžiš (yellow card) 67'; Kochan (yellow card) 86'; Kostadinov (yellow card) 87'	Stadium: Mestský štadión Referee: Filip Glova; Assistant referees: Tomáš Vorel, Anton Perát

6 February 2021 17	Pohronie	3–1	Nitra	Žilina
17:30 CET (UTC+1)	Da Silva 13' (pen.), 90'; Štrba 80'; Heurtaux (yellow card) 86'	Report	Pagliuca 30'; Kolčák (yellow card) 80'	Stadium: Štadión pod Dubňom; Referee: Martin Dohál; Assistant referees: Martin Borsányi, Peter Mihalík

9 February 2021 18	Sereď	0–2	Pohronie	Zlaté Moravce
14:00 CET (UTC+1)	Espinar (yellow card) 9'; Fábry (yellow card) 39'; Hučko (red card) 59'; Iván (yellow card) 68'	Report	Da Silva (yellow card) 33'; Mečiar 62' (o.g.); Fadera 71' (pen.)	Stadium: Štadión FC ViOn; Referee: Boris Marhefka; Assistant referees: Mário Roszbeck, Pavel Jánošík

14 February 2021 19	Pohronie	1–1	Zemplín Michalovce	Žilina
14:00 CET (UTC+1)	Da Silva 18'; Mazan (yellow card) 47'; Weir (yellow card) 58'	Report	Magda (yellow card) 44'; Bednár 45'	Stadium: Štadión pod Dubňom; Referee: Ladislav Prešinský; Assistant referees: Tomáš Somoláni, Jakub Košecký

20 February 2021 20	Slovan Bratislava	1–0	Pohronie	Bratislava
14:00 CET (UTC+1)	De Marco (yellow card) 38'; Daniel 48'	Report	Pavlík (yellow card) 88'	Stadium: Tehelné pole Referee: Ladislav Prešinský; Assistant referees: Anton Perát, Pavel Jánošík

27 February 2021 21	Pohronie	0–1	Trenčín	Žiar nad Hronom
14:00 CET (UTC+1)	Weir (yellow card) 48'; Fadera (yellow card) 52'	Report	Šulek (yellow card) 64'; Čataković (yellow card) 69', (goal) 85'; Slávik (yellow card) 87'	Stadium: Mestský štadión Referee: Peter Kráľovič; Assistant referees: František Ferenc, Pavel Jánošík

6 March 2021 22	Senica	1–1	Pohronie	Senica
14:30 CET (UTC+1)	Ljubičić (yellow card) 39', (goal) 90'; Turčák (yellow card) 49'	Report	Blahút 32'; Adamec (yellow card) 61'; Fadera (yellow card) 74'	Stadium: OMS ARENA Senica; Referee: Adam Somoláni; Assistant referees: Tomáš Vorel, Marek Galo

==== Relegation group ====
===== League table =====
Pos	Team	Pld	W	D	L	GF	GA	GD	Pts	Qualification or relegation	SER	RUŽ	POH	ZMI	SEN	NIT
7	Sereď	32	11	8	13	37	48	−11	41	Qualification for the Europa Conference League play-offs	—	1–0	0–1	2–0	4–1	2–1
8	Ružomberok	32	10	9	13	41	44	−3	39		2–1	—	1–0	2–0	1–1	2–0
9	Pohronie	32	8	14	10	38	38	0	38		1–2	1–0	—	0–0	3–0	0–0
10	Zemplín Michalovce	32	8	11	13	34	53	−19	35		2–2	2–1	1–2	—	1–0	1–1
11	Senica (O)	32	8	9	15	31	51	−20	33	Qualification for the relegation play-offs	1–0	0–1	0–0	1–1	—	1–0
12	Nitra (R)	32	7	6	19	26	55	−29	27	Relegation to the 2. Liga	0–1	1–0	2–3	0–4	0–3	—

Source: Niké liga (in Slovak)
Legend: Blue = home team win; Yellow = draw; Red = away team win.
Rules for classification: 1) Points; 2) Head-to-head points; 3) Head-to-head goal difference; 4) Head-to-head away goals scored; 5) Play-off.
(O) Play-off winners; (R) Relegated

===== Results summary =====
Overall								Home						Away					
Pld	W	D	L	GF	GA	GD	Pts	W	D	L	GF	GA	GD	W	D	L	GF	GA	GD
10	5	3	2	11	6	+5	18	2	2	1	5	2	+3	3	1	1	6	4	+2

Source: Worldfootball

===== Results by round =====
Round	23	24	25	26	27	28	29	30	31	32
Ground	H	A	H	A	A	H	A	H	A	H
Result	W	W	L	W	L	D	W	D	D	W
Position	8	7	8	8	9	9	9	9	9	9
Points	23	26	26	29	29	30	33	34	35	38

Source: Worldfootball
A = Away; H = Home; W = Win; D = Draw; L = Loss

===== Matches =====
13 March 2021 23	Pohronie	3–0	Senica	Žiar nad Hronom
17:00 CET (UTC+1)	Weir (yellow card) 53'; Chvěja 72'; Blahút 76'; Da Silva 84'	Report	Košťál (yellow card) 50'; Ljubičić (yellow card) 90'	Stadium: Mestský štadión Referee: Pavel Ochotnický; Assistant referees: Tomáš Somoláni, Erik Weiss

20 March 2021 24	Nitra	2–3	Pohronie	Nitra
17:02 CET (UTC+1)	Tancík 39', (yellow card) 90'; Mustafić (yellow card) 53'; Šuľa (yellow card) 88'; Franko 89'	Report	Da Silva 42' (pen.); Chvěja 51', 63'; Petrák (yellow card) 58'; Heurtaux (yellow card) 88'	Stadium: Štadión pod Zoborom; Referee: Adam Somoláni; Assistant referees: Peter Bednár, Mário Roszbeck

3 April 2021 25	Pohronie	1–2	Sereď	Žiar nad Hronom
17:00 CEST (UTC+2)	Mazan (yellow card) 38'; Petrák (yellow card) 78'; Župa 90'	Report	Lačný 13'; Danko (yellow card) 30'; Moses 68'; Kuník (yellow card) 71'	Stadium: Mestský štadión Referee: Marek Mastiš; Assistant referees: Mário Roszbeck, Pavel Jánošík

10 April 2021 26	Zemplín Michalovce	1–2	Pohronie	Michalovce
17:00 CEST (UTC+2)	Trusa 66'; Phillips (yellow card) 81'; Oshima (yellow card) 85'; Marković (yellow card) 86'	Report	Weir (yellow card) 34', (goal) 59'; Petrák (yellow card) 37'; Galuška (yellow card) 44'; Da Silva 56'; Chvěja (yellow card) 86'; Hrdlička (yellow card) 90'	Stadium: Mestský futbalový štadión Referee: Peter Kráľovič; Assistant referees: Milan Štrbo, Marek Galo

17 April 2021 27	Ružomberok	1–0	Pohronie	Ružomberok
15:30 CEST (UTC+2)	Mrva (yellow card) 53'; Maslo (yellow card) 57'; Mojžiš 63'; Madleňák (yellow card) 76'	Report	Petrák (yellow card) 16' (yellow-red card) 43'; Da Silva (yellow card) 55'; Badolo (yellow card) 86'	Stadium: Štadión pod Čebraťom; Referee: Martin Dohál; Assistant referees: Branislav Hancko, Mário Roszbeck

24 April 2021 28	Pohronie	0–0	Nitra	Žiar nad Hronom
17:00 CEST (UTC+2)	Weir (yellow card) 43'; Adamec (yellow card) 86'	Report		Stadium: Mestský štadión Referee: Peter Kráľovič; Assistant referees: Erik Weiss, Martin Borsányi

1 May 2021 29	Sereď	0–1	Pohronie	Zlaté Moravce
17:00 CEST (UTC+2)	Hučko (yellow card) 21'; Morong (yellow card) 39'; Slaninka (yellow card) 58'; Yakubu (yellow card) 69'; Lačný (yellow card) 71'; Danko (yellow card) 77'	Report	Fadera (yellow card) 45'; Mazan (yellow card) 61' (red card) 77'; Chvěja 71' (pen.), (yellow card) 79'; Hrdlička (yellow card) 90'	Stadium: Štadión FC ViOn; Referee: Peter Ziemba; Assistant referees: Gabriel Ádám, Anton Perát

8 May 2021 30	Pohronie	0–0	Zemplín Michalovce	Žiar nad Hronom
17:00 CEST (UTC+2)	Galuška (yellow card) 38'; Adamec (yellow card) 58'; Špiriak (yellow card) 90'	Report	Neofytidis (yellow card) 13'; Vojtko (yellow card) 65'	Stadium: Mestský štadión Referee: Ivan Kružliak; Assistant referees: Ján Pozor, Mário Roszbeck

15 May 2021 31	Senica	0–0	Pohronie	Senica
17:00 CEST (UTC+2)		Report	Heurtaux (yellow card) 29'; Špiriak (yellow card) 45'; Chvěja (yellow card) 84'	Stadium: OMS ARENA Senica; Attendance: 354; Referee: Peter Kráľovič; Assistant referees: Tomáš Vorel, Tomáš Straka

22 May 2021 32	Pohronie	1–0	Ružomberok	Žiar nad Hronom
19:00 CEST (UTC+2)	Chvěja 49'; Weir (yellow card) 83'	Report	Kojnok (yellow card) 12' (yellow-red card) 25'; Maslo (yellow card) 39'; Zsigmund (yellow card) 42'; Mojžiš (yellow card) 69'	Stadium: Mestský štadión Attendance: 399; Referee: Martin Dohál; Assistant referees: Daniel Poláček, Erik Weiss

=== Slovak Cup ===
8 September 2020 Second round	Dunajská Lužná	0–4	Pohronie	Dunajská Lužná
16:30 CEST (UTC+2)	Ducár (yellow card) 32'; Lukáč (yellow card) 58'	Report	Bangala (yellow card) 28'; Bimenyimana 48'; Weir 52'; Matić 74'; Blahút 90'	Stadium: NTC Dunajská Lužná; Attendance: 123; Referee: Bálint Kišš; Assistant referees: Peter Kováč, Anton Hrenák

16 September 2020 Third round	Rača	0–6	Pohronie	Rača
16:00 CEST (UTC+2)	Maďarík (yellow card) 13'; Adam (yellow card) 17'; Kňažek (yellow card) 32'	Report	Abrahám 2', 45'; Bimenyimana 58', 65'; Fadera 61'; Pellegrini 69'; Lindsay (red card) 78'	Stadium: Štadión FK Rača; Attendance: 100; Referee: Marek Mastiš; Assistant referees: Juraj Halíček, Miloš Lalo

Fourth round	FC Košice	Cancelled (Note: The match against FC Košice was cancelled due to the suspension and subsequent restructuring of the 2020–21 Slovak Cup amid the COVID-19 pandemic in Slovakia, which resulted in the exclusion of clubs from lower league.)	Pohronie	Košice
				Stadium: Štadión Lokomotívy

6 April 2021 Round of 16	Pohronie	1–2	Petržalka	Topoľčany
16:00 CEST (UTC+2)	Galuška 33'; Jenat (yellow card) 89'	Report	Kudlička (yellow card) 18'; Filipiak (yellow card) 18'; Gašparovič 22'; Obročník 77', (yellow card) 89'	Stadium: Štadión Vojtecha Schotterta; Attendance: 0 Referee: Bálint Kišš; Assistant referees: Tomáš Vorel, Adam Jekkel; Fourth official: Martin Ježík
