= Ivan Audino =

Swiss footballer (born 1991)

Personal information
- Full name: Ivan Audino
- Date of birth: 13 July 1991 (age 35)
- Place of birth: Wetzikon, Switzerland
- Height: 1.78 m (5 ft 10 in)
- Position: Midfielder

Youth career
- –2004: FC Wetzikon
- 2005–2006: Team Zürcher Oberland
- 2006–2008: Winterthur
- 2009–2012: Zürich

Senior career*
Years	Team	Apps	(Gls)
2008	Winterthur	3	(0)
2009–2012	Zürich II	80	(23)
2010	Zürich	1	(0)
2012–2019	Wil 1900	168	(32)
2016–2017	→ Aarau (loan)	28	(3)
2019–2020	Bellinzona	4	(0)
2020	Pohronie	6	(0)
2021–2022	Trikala	14	(0)

International career^{‡}
2009	Switzerland U19	3	(0)
- * Club domestic league appearances and goals as of 10:03, 26 July 2022 (UTC) ‡ National team caps and goals as of 24 October 2020

Ivan Audino (born 13 July 1991) is a Swiss professional footballer who last played as a midfielder for Greek Super League 2 club Trikala.

== Club career ==
=== FK Pohronie ===
Pohronie announced Audino's signing on 24 October 2020, hours before a Fortuna Liga match against Senica. He became the sole Swiss player in the league, the first to play for Pohronie and a first arrival under Jan Kameník as Pohronie's manager. He made his debut on the same day in the said home fixture coming on as a replacement for Patrik Blahút after 62 minutes of play, with the score set at 1:1 following goals by Dominik Špiriak and Oskar Fotr. Senica, however, took the win, after a goal by former league top-scorer Tomáš Malec less than 10 minutes later.

Audino departed from the club as early as January 2021, following merely 6 appearances.
