= Peter Chríbik =

Slovak footballer (born 1999)

Personal information
- Full name: Peter Chríbik
- Date of birth: 2 February 1999 (age 27)
- Place of birth: Žilina, Slovakia
- Height: 1.87 m (6 ft 2 in)
- Position: Defender

Team information
- Current team: Draßburg

Youth career
- Žilina

Senior career*
Years	Team	Apps	(Gls)
2016–2020	Žilina B	45	(0)
2020	→ Pohronie (loan)	9	(0)
2020	Pohronie	14	(0)
2021	Nitra	8	(0)
2021	Púchov	7	(1)
2022	Draßburg	13	(0)
2022	Javorník Makov	10	(2)
2023	Petržalka	6	(0)
2023–	SC-ESV Parndorf 1919	15	(4)
- * Club domestic league appearances and goals as of 21:10, 9 January 2024 (UTC)

Peter Chríbik (born 2 February 1999) is a Slovak defensive footballer.

== Club career ==
=== MŠK Žilina reserves ===
Chríbik made his debut in DOXXXbet liga on 9 March 2016. He came on as a replacement for Rastislav Václavik, who suffered an injury, in a fixture against Senec, during the first half. Žilina B went on to win 1:3.

=== FK Pohronie ===
On 8 February 2020, Žilina had announced that Chríbik and forward Roland Gerebenits, will join Pohronie on half-season loan. In Chríbik's case, it was noted as a first experience with senior football, as in Žilina he failed to make it to the senior squad, playing for the reservers only. Chríbik's contract therefore included an option to buy. Gerebenits, however, was expected to return to Žilina, with Pohronie providing him with senior football play-time to definitively penetrate Žilina's first squad. During the autumn half of the season, Pohronie already hosted former Žilina player Michal Klec.

Chríbik made his Fortuna Liga debut on 15 February 2020, at pod Zoborom, in a goal-less tie against the home side, Nitra. Chríbik entered the pitch in the 76th minute as a tactical replacement for Peter Mazan, with the primary aim of maintaining Tomáš Jenčo's clean sheet. Gerebenits also made an appearance in this match, in the starting line-up. He was replaced some ten minutes before Chríbik's fielding.

Chribík then made his starting-XI debut in the following round against his mother club of MŠK Žilina, on 22 February 2020. He played as a defensive midfielder along with Michal Obročník. Despite a solid and a long-resisting performance, Pohronie went on to lose, at home, 0:1, with the match's sole goal scored by Polish youth international Dawid Kurminowski in the second half, after he had replaced Lukáš Jánošík.

He departed from the club in January 2021, after he was no longer a part of the plans of Jan Kameník.

=== FC Nitra ===
In February 2021, Chríbik signed with Nitra.
