= Martin Repiský =

Slovak football goalkeeper

Personal information
- Full name: Martin Repiský
- Date of birth: 4 November 2000 (age 26)
- Place of birth: Župkov, Slovakia
- Position: Goalkeeper

Team information
- Current team: Slovan Galanta

Youth career
- 2012–2020: Pohronie
- 2014–2015: → Žarnovica (loan)
- 2018–2020: → Slovan Bratislava (loan)

Senior career*
Years	Team	Apps	(Gls)
2020	Pohronie	2	(0)
2021	Slavoj Trebišov	6	(0)
2022	Žarnovica	11	(0)
2022–	Slovan Galanta	0	(0)
- * Club domestic league appearances and goals as of 30 June 2022

Martin Repiský (born 4 November 2000) is a Slovak football goalkeeper who currently plays for Slovan Galanta.

== Career ==
=== Pohronie ===
Repiský began his senior career with Pohronie competing in the Slovak top division, after returning from a loan spell in the youth teams of Slovan Bratislava. He moved to replace departing Czech goalkeeper Matěj Luksch as a back-up goalkeeper to Tomáš Jenčo.

Repiský made his Fortuna Liga debut in the premier round of the 2020–21 season, in an away fixture at ViOn Aréna against ViOn Zlaté Moravce, being preferred over Jenčo due to his shoulder injury. Repiský had a bad start to the match, conceding two goals in three minutes from Martin Kovaľ and Tomáš Ďubek. Pohronie however moved to equalise the game in the second half through late goals by Alieu Fadera and a free-kick goal by James Weir.

==== Loan at Slavoj Trebišov ====
In the winter of 2021, Repiský was loaned out to 2. Liga club Slavoj Trebišov to gain more experience.
