= Bernard Petrák =

Slovak footballer (born 1999)

Personal information
- Full name: Bernard Petrák
- Date of birth: 15 December 1999 (age 26)
- Place of birth: Voronezh, Russia
- Height: 1.78 m (5 ft 10 in)
- Position: Left-back

Team information
- Current team: Zvolen
- Number: 33

Youth career
- 2009–2010: Žilina
- 2011: OZ Mládežnícky futbal Závodie
- 2011–2016: Žilina
- 2012–2013: → OZ Mládežnícky futbal Závodie (loan)
- 2013–2014: → FC Ajax Slimáčik Žilina (loan)

Senior career*
Years	Team	Apps	(Gls)
2016–2020	Žilina B	43	(1)
2020	→ Podbrezová (loan)	0	(0)
2020−2021	Pohronie	26	(1)
2021−2022	Odra Opole	15	(0)
2023−2024	Košice	32	(4)
2024	Dukla Banská Bystrica	2	(0)
2025−	Zvolen	35	(5)
- * Club domestic league appearances and goals as of 17 May 2026

Bernard Petrák (born 15 December 1999) is a Slovak professional footballer who plays as a left-back for Zvolen.

== Club career ==
=== FK Pohronie ===
Petrák had joined Pohronie on a half-season contract ahead of the 2020–21 season, making the Žiar nad Hronom-based club his first top division career stop.

Petrák made his Fortuna Liga debut for Pohronie in a first round away fixture at ViOn Aréna against ViOn Zlaté Moravce on 8 August 2020. Petrák entered the play after 68 minutes of the game, replacing Richard Župa, when Pohronie trailed two goals behind, after two first-half goals by Tomáš Ďubek and Petrák's former team-mate Martin Kovaľ. Late in the match however, Pohronie managed to equalise through Alieu Fadera and stoppage time free kick by James Weir.
