= David Bangala =

Congolese footballer (born 1997)

Personal information
- Full name: David Bangala
- Date of birth: 14 June 1997 (age 29)
- Place of birth: Kinshasa, Democratic Republic of the Congo
- Height: 1.85 m (6 ft 1 in)
- Position: Defender

Youth career
- Le Havre

Senior career*
Years	Team	Apps	(Gls)
2016–2017	Oissel	3	(0)
2017–2018	Valenciennes B	?	(?)
2018–2019	Stade Briochin	0	(0)
2019–2020	Gonfreville	14	(1)
2020–2022	Pohronie	21	(0)
2022–2023	Ayr United	6	(0)
2023	→ Cove Rangers (loan)	6	(0)
- * Club domestic league appearances and goals as of 20:23, 9 January 2024 (UTC)

David Bangala (born 14 June 1997) is a Congolese professional footballer who last played as a defender for Scottish Championship side Ayr United.

== Club career ==
=== FK Pohronie ===
After over 5 years in French lower divisions, in August 2020, Bangala joined Slovak top division club FK Pohronie, citing great pleasure over the two-year deal, particularly considering the troubles and difficulties in the previous seasons.

At the beginning of the season Bangala had replaced Ján Hatok, who had left the squad despite being a crucial part of the team in the 2019–20 season, playing as a right back. Bangala, however, came to be utilised as a defensive midfielder instead. He made his competitive Fortuna Liga debut during an away fixture of the first round of the season at ViOn Aréna, on 8 August 2020, against ViOn Zlaté Moravce. Pohronie went two down during the first half, with ViOn's second goal coming from. Through Fadera and Weir late in the second half Pohronie managed to get a point from the match after a 2:2 tie.

On 20 February, during a narrow 0:1 defeat at Tehelné pole against Slovan Bratislava, Bangala suffered a knee injury requiring surgery, which had removed him from action from most of the remaining fixtures of the season.

=== Ayr United ===
In June 2022, Bangala joined Ayr United on a two-year contract, following the relegation of Pohronie to the Slovak second division. After only making a handful of appearances, he was loaned to Cove Rangers for the remainder of the 22/23 season. Bangala was released from Ayr in May 2023.

== Personal life ==
As a teenager, Bangala was orphaned and had to help raise his younger sister.
