= Willie Britto =

Ivorian international footballer

Personal information
- Full name: Dagou Willie Anderson Britto
- Date of birth: 15 December 1996 (age 29)
- Place of birth: Tapéguhé, Ivory Coast
- Height: 1.82 m (6 ft 0 in)
- Position: Right back

Team information
- Current team: Mosta
- Number: 20

Youth career
- 2010–2013: Academy Symbiose

Senior career*
Years	Team	Apps	(Gls)
2013–2015	Indenié Abenegourou	41	(0)
2015–2019	Tanda	81	(3)
2019–2021	Zürich	19	(0)
2021	→ Pohronie (loan)	1	(0)
2023–	Mosta	23	(0)

International career^{‡}
2014–2015	Ivory Coast U20	10	(0)
2015	Ivory Coast U23	5	(0)
2014–2019	Ivory Coast	11	(0)
- * Club domestic league appearances and goals as of 13 May 2024 ‡ National team caps and goals as of 18 August 2020

Dagou Willie Anderson Britto (born 15 December 1996), known as Willie Britto, is an Ivorian professional footballer who plays as a right back for Maltese side Mosta.

== Professional career ==
On 4 July 2019, Britto signed with FC Zürich on a 4-year contract. He made his debut with Zürich in a 4-0 Swiss Super League loss to FC Lugano on 21 July 2019. On 18 August 2021, the contract with Zürich was terminated by mutual agreement.

=== FK Pohronie ===
Britto signed with Fortuna Liga club FK Pohronie on a half-year loan. Britto made his Fortuna Liga debut for Pohronie on 6 February 2021, in a fixture played at neutral ground at Štadión pod Dubňom, against Nitra. He was featured in the starting line-up but was taken off the pitch and replaced by Alieu Fadera, with the score at 1:1, due to an injury. Pohronie won the fixture 3:1, following two strikes by Adler Da Silva and one by Andrej Štrba. Nitra connected by Kilian Pagliuca. This constituted Pohronie's mere second victory in the season. Due to the injury, Britto did not appear in any further matches for Pohronie.

== International career ==
Britto debuted for the Ivory Coast football team in a 1-1 friendly tie with Zambia on 25 October 2014. He represented the Ivory Coast U23s at the 2015 Toulon Tournament.
