= Samuel Dovec =

Slovak footballer (born 2001)

Personal information
- Full name: Samuel Dovec
- Date of birth: 15 December 2001 (age 24)
- Place of birth: Hliník nad Hronom, Slovakia
- Position: Goalkeeper

Team information
- Current team: Hamsik Academy
- Number: 1

Youth career
- 2009–2013: TJ PS Hliník nad Hronom
- 2013–2021: Pohronie
- 2016–2018: → Železiarne Podbrezová (loan)

Senior career*
Years	Team	Apps	(Gls)
2019–2021	Pohronie	1	(0)
2022	Kalná nad Hronom	13	(0)
2023–	Hamsik Academy	6	(0)
- * Club domestic league appearances and goals as of 22:04, 9 January 2024 (UTC)

Samuel Dovec (born 15 December 2001) is a Slovak professional footballer who plays as a goalkeeper for RSC Hamsik Academy.

== Career ==
=== FK Pohronie ===
Dovec was promoted to the first team in January 2020, after a departure of Martin Vantruba and a retirement of Roman Packo, one of Pohronie's 'founding players'. He was considered to be third goalkeeper after Tomáš Jenčo and a recent arrival from Dynamo České Budějovice, Matěj Luksch.

Regardless, Dovec had already been benched for Pohronie's first squad, on two occasions, in November 2019. First, on 9 November, at Štadión Antona Malatinského, in a league fixture against Spartak Trnava (2:3 loss) and then on 14 November in a home Cup fixture against ViOn Zlaté Moravce (0:1 loss).

Dovec had to wait until August 2020 for his debut appearance. In absence of Tomáš Jenčo, caused by a shoulder injury, Martin Repiský was fielded for the first two games of the season against ViOn Zlaté Moravce and DAC Dunajská Streda. Dovec finally made the debut in a third round Fortuna Liga away fixture at Štadión Antona Malatinského against Spartak Trnava. Dovec conceded early after a goal by Gergely Tumma but the yellow-blues had equalised in the second half through Bonfils-Caleb Bimenyimana. Soon after that Dovec had conceded once more. Ján Vlasko had sent the free-kick into the box and Erik Pačinda had sent the header into Dovec's arms. While fallen on the ground Marek Václav had tapped the ball into the net but Dovec had his hand on the ball, hence the goal was disallowed. Pohronie took a surprising point from the game, following a 1:1 tie.
