= Matěj Luksch =

Czech footballer (born 1998)

Personal information
- Full name: Matěj Luksch
- Date of birth: 19 June 1998 (age 28)
- Place of birth: České Budějovice, Czech Republic
- Height: 1.93 m (6 ft 4 in)
- Position: Goalkeeper

Youth career
- 2002–2019: Dynamo České Budějovice

Senior career*
Years	Team	Apps	(Gls)
2019–2021	Dynamo České Budějovice B	14	(0)
2020	→ Pohronie (loan)	0	(0)
2020–2021	→ Tatran Liptovský Mikuláš (loan)	27	(0)
2021–2022	Tatran Liptovský Mikuláš	16	(0)
2022–2024	Dynamo České Budějovice	0	(0)
2023	→ Železiarned Podbrezová (loan)	1	(0)
2023-2024	→ Skalica (loan)	11	(0)
- * Club domestic league appearances and goals as of 4 July 2024

Matěj Luksch (born 19 June 1998) is a Czech professional footballer who plays as a goalkeeper.

== Club career ==
=== Dynamo České Budějovice ===
After playing for the youth teams, Luksch began his senior career with the reserves squad of his local club, Dynamo České Budějovice, in the summer of 2019. He competed in Czech 4th tier - in Divize A, where he collected 14 starts for the reserves squad. He was also the third goalkeeper for the first squad, but did not make an appearance in any game.

=== Loan at FK Pohronie ===
On 8 February 2020, Dynamo České Budějovice had announced, that Luksch will depart for Slovak, Žiar nad Hronom-based club of FK Pohronie. He was understood to be a second, an alternate goalkeeper to long-term number one for the club, Tomáš Jenčo.

Luksch enjoyed his first match nomination on 22 February 2020, in a home fixture against Žilina. He did not feature in the game. Pohronie lost narrowly, 0:1. A week ago, at pod Zoborom, against Nitra, Samuel Dovec was preferred instead of him. Luksch appeared in one of the friendly games prior to Fortuna Liga restart, on 30 May 2020, in a 3:1 victory over Ružomberok, marking his first match appearance for the club since his signing.

During his spell for Pohronie, Luksch made no competitive appearances.

=== Tatran Liptovský Mikuláš ===
Luksch had signed with Tatran Liptovský Mikuláš in the summer of 2020.
