= 2000–01 Slovak Cup =

Tournament details
- Country: Slovakia
- Teams: 42

Final positions
- Champions: Inter Bratislava
- Runners-up: SCP Ružomberok

The 2000–01 Slovak Cup was the 32nd season of Slovakia's annual knock-out cup competition and the eighth since the independence of Slovakia. It began on 25 July 2000 with the matches of preliminary round and ended on 8 May 2001 with the final. The winners of the competition earned a place in the qualifying round of the UEFA Cup. Inter Bratislava were the defending champions.

== Preliminary round ==
The first legs were played on 25 and 26 July 2000. The second legs were played on 2 August 2000.

Team 1	Agg.	Team 2	1st leg	2nd leg
Inter Bratislava B	1–5	VTJ Topoľčany	1–1	0–4
Družstevník Slovenský Grob	2–2 (2–4 p)	Nové Zámky	1–1	1–1
Calex Zlaté Moravce	1–0	Rapid Bratislava	0–0	1–0
Tesla Stropkov	2–2 (a)	Slavoj Trebišov	2–1	0–1
ZTS VTJ Martin	2–2 (a)	FK Čaňa	2–1	0–1
Petrochema Dubová	3–2	Slovan Levice	1–1	2–1

== First round ==
The games were played on 19 and 20 September 2000.

Team 1	Score	Team 2
ŠKP Devín	1–1 (3–5 p)	Inter Bratislava
SH Senica	1–1 (6–7 p)	Koba Senec
Nové Zámky	1–2	Slovan Bratislava
Baník Prievidza	0–0 (2–4 p)	Artmedia Petržalka
Slavoj Trebišov	1–3	HFC Humenné
Železiarne Podbrezová	2–0	Matador Púchov
Slovan Bratislava B	1–1 (3–4 p)	Spartak Trnava
NCHZ Nováky	4–0	FC Nitra
Calex Zlaté Moravce	0–0 (4–3 p)	DAC Dunajská Streda
VTJ Topoľčany	1–2	Ozeta Dukla Trenčín
FK Čaňa	2–2 (5–4 p)	Tatran Prešov
Žiar nad Hronom	0–0 (4–2 p)	1. FC Košice
BSC JAS Bardejov	0–2	MŠK Žilina
Rimavská Sobota	0–0 (3–1 p)	Kerametal Dubnica nad Váhom
Steel Trans Ličartovce	2–2 (3–4 p)	Dukla Banská Bystrica
Petrochema Dubová	0–4	SCP Ružomberok

== Second round ==
The seven games were played on 7 and 8 November 2000 and the match NCHZ Nováky – Inter Bratislava was played on 21 November 2000.

Team 1	Score	Team 2
Koba Senec	1–1 (4–2 p)	Slovan Bratislava
MŠK Žilina	0–2	Dukla Banská Bystrica
Žiar nad Hronom	2–1	Rimavská Sobota
HFC Humenné	5–0	Spartak Trnava
SCP Ružomberok	4–1	FK Čaňa
Calex Zlaté Moravce	0–0 (3–5 p)	Artmedia Petržalka
Ozeta Dukla Trenčín	1–2	Železiarne Podbrezová
NCHZ Nováky	1–1 (3–4 p)	Inter Bratislava

== Quarter-finals ==
The three games were played on 21 and 22 November 2000 and the match Koba Senec – Inter Bratislava was played on 29 November 2000.

Team 1	Score	Team 2
Železiarne Podbrezová	2–1	Dukla Banská Bystrica
Žiar nad Hronom	2–1	HFC Humenné
Artmedia Petržalka	2–3	SCP Ružomberok
Koba Senec	0–0 (2–4 p)	Inter Bratislava

== Semi-finals ==
The first legs were played on 13 March 2001. The second legs were played on 3 April 2001.

=== First legs ===
13 March 2001	Železiarne Podbrezová	0–2	Inter Bratislava	Podbrezová
14:45		Report	Kratochvíl 23'; Sz. Németh 64'	Stadium: Štadión Kolkáreň; Attendance: 5,000; Referee: Anton Stredák

13 March 2001	Žiar nad Hronom	1–5	SCP Ružomberok	Žiar nad Hronom
15:00	Juška 20'	Report	Varadín 4', 53', 77'; Šafranko 74' (pen.); Hýravý 87' (pen.)	Stadium: Mestský štadión Žiar nad Hronom; Attendance: 4,900; Referee: Ladislav Doboš

=== Second legs ===
3 April 2001	Inter Bratislava	0–0 (2–0 agg.)	Železiarne Podbrezová	Bratislava
15:30		Report		Stadium: Štadión Pasienky; Attendance: 400; Referee: Pavol Šipoš

3 April 2001	SCP Ružomberok	2–1 (7–2 agg.)	Žiar nad Hronom	Ružomberok
15:30	Hellebrand 31'; Šafranko 44'	Report	Bončo 8'	Stadium: Štadión pod Čebraťom; Attendance: 1,928; Referee: Peter Mriglot

== Final ==
8 May 2001
17:00 CEST

SCP Ružomberok	0–1	Inter Bratislava
	Report	Sz. Németh 90'

Mestský štadión, Dubnica nad Váhom
Attendance: 5,200
Referee: Eduard Cichy
