= Roland Gerebenits =

Slovak footballer

Personal information
- Full name: Roland Gerebenits
- Date of birth: 7 May 2000 (age 26)
- Place of birth: Žilina, Slovakia
- Height: 1.84 m (6 ft 0 in)
- Position: Forward

Team information
- Current team: Považská Bystrica
- Number: 9

Youth career
- 2009–2019: Žilina

Senior career*
Years	Team	Apps	(Gls)
2016–2021	Žilina B	80	(21)
2016–2019	Žilina	7	(0)
2020	→ Pohronie (loan)	5	(0)
2020–2021	→ Železiarne Podbrezová (loan)	17	(2)
2022–	Enosis Neon Paralimni	0	(0)
2022–2023	Petržalka	12	(0)
2023–	Považská Bystrica	28	(8)

International career^{‡}
- Slovakia U15
- Slovakia U16
2015–2017	Slovakia U17	11	(2)
2017	Slovakia U18	1	(0)
2021	Slovakia U21	2	(0)
- * Club domestic league appearances and goals as of 22:49, 9 January 2024 (UTC) ‡ National team caps and goals as of 19:19, 10 October 2021 (UTC)

Roland Gerebenits (born 7 May 2000) is a Slovak professional footballer who currently plays for Považská Bystrica.

== Club career ==
=== MŠK Žilina ===
Gerebenits made his Fortuna Liga debut for Žilina against Senica on 12 August 2017. Žilina had destroyed Senica 7–1. Gerebenits replaced Miroslav Káčer, who scored one of 6 goals of Žilina to the point. Later on in the pitch Gerebenits witnessed the seventh goal by Michal Škvarka.

=== Loan at Pohronie ===
On 8 February 2020, Žilina had announced that Gerebenits and captain of the reserve squad, Peter Chríbik, will join Pohronie on half-season loan. In Gerebenits' case, it was noted as a step to help him penetrate Žilina's main squad. Consequently, unlike Chríbik, his contract did not include an option-to-buy clause. During the autumn half of the season, Pohronie already hosted former Žilina player Michal Klec.

Gerebenits made his Fortuna Liga debut for Pohronie on 15 February 2020 against Nitra at pod Zoborom. The match concluded in a goal-less tie, despite both teams being in a direct threat of relegation. Gerebenits played from the start, as a centre forward along with Ismar Tandir. In the 51st minute he was failed to convert a promising header, following a cross from Peter Mazan, from deep within the penalty area. Gerebenits was replaced by Patrik Blahút after less than 70 minutes. Chríbik also made his debut in the match.

Overall, he had concluded his spell with the Žiar nad Hronom-based club with 5 Fortuna Liga appearances, without scoring a goal, before concluding his loan on 30 June 2020 as an unnecessary player even though the season was not yet completed due to the delay caused by the COVID-19 pandemic. Manager Mikuláš Radványi opted not to extend the loan by few weeks needed to complete the season.

=== Loan at Železiarne Podbrezová ===
At the start of the 2020–21 season, Gerebenits headed for another loan. This time at a 2. Liga club Železiarne Podbrezová. His season-long contract included an option to purchase as he had failed to penetrate the senior squad of Žilina.
