= Dani Espinar =

Spanish footballer

Personal information
- Full name: Daniel Espinar Vallejo
- Date of birth: 17 April 1995 (age 31)
- Place of birth: Málaga, Spain
- Height: 1.80 m (5 ft 11 in)
- Position: Midfielder

Team information
- Current team: Europa
- Number: 6

Senior career*
Years	Team	Apps	(Gls)
2014–2015	Real Valladolid Promesas	36	(0)
2016–2017	El Ejido	32	(1)
2017–2018	Balompédica Linense	16	(1)
2018	Alhaurino	15	(3)
2019	Mérida	31	(1)
2020	Tarazona	6	(2)
2020	Vélez	9	(0)
2021	Sereď	3	(0)
2021–2022	Este	28	(2)
2022–2023	Ugento		
2023	Manduria		
2023	Bitonto	3	(0)
2024–2025	Sambiase		
2025	Castelnuovo Vomano		
2025–2026	Renato Curi Angolana		
2026–	Europa	2	(0)
- * Club domestic league appearances and goals as of 18 January 2026

Daniel Espinar Vallejo, known as Dani Espinar (born 15 February 2000) is a Spanish professional footballer who plays as a midfielder.

== Club career ==
=== ŠKF Sereď ===
Espinar made his Fortuna Liga debut on 9 February 2021 at ViOn Aréna in a fixture against Pohronie. He was featured in the starting line-up and was replaced by Denis Potoma after about an hour of play. Soon after his substitution, Pohronie took the lead through an own goal by Martin Mečiar and after 70 minutes of play Alieu Fadera increased the lead to and sealed the final score at 0:2 for Pohronie, which was the team's second victory in the season.

=== Europa FC ===
In January 2026, after a period in Italy, Espinar joined Gibraltar Football League side Europa. He made his debut on 9 January against St Joseph's.
