= Kojo Matić =

Bosnian footballer (born 1995)

Personal information
- Date of birth: 7 November 1995 (age 31)
- Place of birth: Bijeljina, Republika Srpska, Bosnia and Herzegovina
- Height: 1.83 m (6 ft 0 in)
- Position: Midfielder

Team information
- Current team: Zvijezda 09
- Number: 8

Youth career
- Proleter Zrenjanin
- Podrinje Janja
- Drina Zvornik
- Železnik Belgrade

Senior career*
Years	Team	Apps	(Gls)
2015	Dornach	12	(5)
2016	Sursee	12	(4)
2016	Podrinje Janja	11	(0)
2017	Nové Zámky	35	(6)
2018	Družstevník Veľké Ludince	32	(7)
2019	Gabčíkovo	28	(10)
2020	Pohronie	18	(0)
2021	Partizán Bardejov	6	(1)
2022–	Zvijezda 09	55	(6)
- * Club domestic league appearances and goals as of 1 June 2024

Kojo Matić (born 7 November 1995) is a professional footballer who plays as a midfielder for Zvijezda 09.

== Career ==
=== Early tenure in Slovakia ===
Matić arrived in Slovakia in the winter of 2017. He spent his first two years in three clubs in 3. Liga West – Nové Zámky, Družstevník Veľké Ludince, Gabčíkovo. Across two calendar years, he scored over 20 goals in almost 100 games in the league.

=== FK Pohronie ===
Matić joined Pohronie in January 2020. It was his first top-division football club. He transferred into the club from the third division club of Gabčíkovo. Upon his transfer he became a third player named Matić to feature in the league, following brothers Nemanja and Uroš. They are not related. Upon his arrival, Matić had commented on the professionalism in the club and the satisfying winter preparation. Matić was congratulated on this transfer by the Real Madrid star Luka Jović, via Instagram, who was his neighbour and with whom he remains a close friend.

Matić was first nominated for a Fortuna Liga fixture in a goal-less tie against Nitra at pod Zoborom on 15 February 2020. He did not appear in the match though. He scored two goals in two friendly matches against Ružomberok in late May 2020, as Fortuna Liga sides had prepared for a league restart. First, on 25 May, at pod Čebraťom, he equalised the game to the final score of 1–1, following earlier goal from Rastislav Kružliak. Few days later he scored the opening goal of the match in a 3–1 win over the same opponent on home stadium. Pohronie scored two more through James Weir and Patrik Abrahám.

He departed from the club in January 2021, with a single Slovnaft Cup goal against Dunajská Lužná.
