= Andrej Štrba =

Slovak footballer (born 1998)

Personal information
- Full name: Andrej Štrba
- Date of birth: 28 February 1998 (age 28)
- Place of birth: Čadca, Slovakia
- Position: Centre back

Team information
- Current team: Tatran Liptovský Mikuláš
- Number: 3

Youth career
- 2007–2013: Čadca
- 2013–2017: Spartak Trnava

Senior career*
Years	Team	Apps	(Gls)
2017–2019	Inter Bratislava	43	(2)
2020	Tatran Liptovský Mikuláš	14	(0)
2021–2023	Pohronie	48	(2)
2023–	Tatran Liptovský Mikuláš	28	(1)

International career^{‡}
- Slovakia U15
- Slovakia U16
2014–2015	Slovakia U17	6	(0)
2016	Slovakia U18	1	(0)
- * Club domestic league appearances and goals as of 22 June 2024 ‡ National team caps and goals as of 5 January 2021

Andrej Štrba (born 28 February 1998) is a Slovak professional footballer who currently plays for 2. Liga club Tatran Liptovský Mikuláš.

== Club career ==
=== FK Pohronie ===
Štrba's arrival at Pohronie was announced on January 4, 2021, on the club's official website. This marked his third career stop in senior football, following stints at Inter Bratislava and Tatran Liptovský Mikuláš, and also represented his first opportunity at a top division club.

Štrba made his Fortuna Liga debut in a neutral ground fixture against Nitra on February 6, 2021. He started the match and played the entire duration. Pohronie took the lead through Adler Da Silva's penalty, but Nitra equalised with a goal from Kilian Pagliuca before halftime. The Žiar nad Hronom-based club regained the lead in the 80th minute when Štrba scored, converting Ondřej Chvěja's pass after a scuffle following a corner kick. Da Silva sealed the victory with the last goal of the game in stoppage time, assisted by Fadera, resulting in a final score of 3-1. This win marked only the second victory of the season for Pohronie in the 17th round.
