= Libor Hrdlička =

Slovak footballer (born 1986)

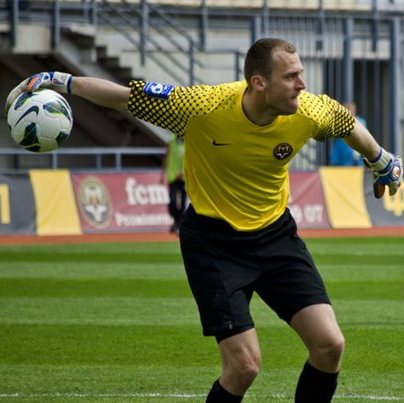

Personal information
- Full name: Libor Hrdlička
- Date of birth: 2 January 1986 (age 40)
- Place of birth: Bratislava, Czechoslovakia
- Height: 1.91 m (6 ft 3 in)
- Position: Goalkeeper

Youth career
- 1995–2005: ASK Inter Bratislava

Senior career*
Years	Team	Apps	(Gls)
2005–2009	Brno	2	(0)
2010–2012	Ružomberok	66	(0)
2013–2014	Metalurh Zaporizhzhia	25	(0)
2015–2016	Dinamo Tbilisi	31	(0)
2016–2018	Ruch Chorzów	40	(0)
2018–2019	AS Trenčín	8	(0)
2019	→ Inter Bratislava (loan)	11	(0)
2019–2020	Karviná	12	(0)
2020	→ Petržalka (loan)	1	(0)
2021	Pohronie	26	(0)
2021–2024	UFC Pamhagen		

International career
2004–2005	Slovakia U18	6	(0)
- * Club domestic league appearances and goals

Libor Hrdlička (born 2 January 1986) is a Slovak former professional footballer who played as a goalkeeper.

== Career ==
He notably for the played for Corgoň Liga club Ružomberok, Ukrainian Premier League club Metalurh Zaporizhzhia and multiple-time Georgian champion Dinamo Tbilisi.

In January 2021, he joined Žiar nad Hronom-based club FK Pohronie to cover for Tomáš Jenčo. Immediately, however, he became the preferred goalkeeper and after keeping a clean sheet in 7 of 14 league appearances, he contributed to Pohronie's efforts in avoiding relegation. He parted from the club in January 2022.

== Honours ==
Dinamo Tbilisi

- Erovnuli Liga: 2015–16
- Georgian Cup: 2014–15, 2015–16
