= Bonfils-Caleb Bimenyimana =

Burundian footballer (born 1997)

Personal information
- Full name: Bonfils-Caleb Bimenyimana
- Date of birth: 21 November 1997 (age 28)
- Place of birth: Bujumbura, Burundi
- Height: 1.98 m (6 ft 6 in)
- Position: Forward

Team information
- Current team: Jeddah
- Number: 28

Senior career*
Years	Team	Apps	(Gls)
2016–2017	Vital'O	26	(14)
2017–2019	Rayon Sports	37	(26)
2019–2021	Rigas FS	10	(1)
2019	→ Atlantas (loan)	13	(3)
2020	→ Pohronie (loan)	14	(3)
2021	Kaisar	7	(0)
2022–2023	Kaizer Chiefs	17	(7)
2023–2024	Al-Ahly Benghazi	0	(0)
2024–2025	Zob Ahan	4	(0)
2025	USM Alger	10	(3)
2025–	Jeddah	13	(5)

International career^{‡}
2017–	Burundi	32	(8)
- * Club domestic league appearances and goals as of 10 March 2026 ‡ National team caps and goals as of 17 November 2026

Bonfils-Caleb Bimenyimana (born 21 November 1997) is a Burundian professional footballer who plays as a forward for Saudi club Jeddah.

== Career ==
=== FK Pohronie ===
Bimenyimana had joined Slovak Super Liga club FK Pohronie in mid-August 2020, following a prolonged scouting by the club. He signed with the Žiar nad Hronom-based club for two years. He made his league debut at Štadión Antona Malatinského on 15 August 2020 starting in a 1–1 tie against Spartak Trnava. Trnava took the lead in the first ten minutes through Gergely Tumma before Bimenyimana equalised the score and set the final at 1–1 after an hour of play.

He also scored in the next game on 22 August 2020, in an upset home victory against Žilina. He scored the opening goal of the 2–1 win during the first half before being replaced by Patrik Abrahám, due to an injury, after 40 minutes. In the second half, Patrik Iľko equalized but Pohronie re-gained the lead and gained the win through Alieu Fadera. He achieved his last league goal in a 2–2 tie against iClinic Sereď on 19 September and two further goals three days earlier during a Cup fixture against lower division FK Rača.

Following this, Bimenyimana failed to score in nine subsequent matches and departed from the club in January 2021.

=== Kaizer Chiefs ===
On 22 August 2022, Bimenyimana signed a two-year contract with South African club Kaizer Chiefs. On 17 September 2022, in his first start for the club, he scored two goals in a 2–1 league match win against Supersport United.

=== USM Alger ===
On 25 February 2025, Bimenyimana has finally been qualified by the LFP. Who was signed after the end of his contract with Zob Ahan. His signature was validated in the very last hours of the transfer window but it took 15 days for the player status committee of FAF to make a final decision on his case. Bimenyimana signed a one-year contract with USM Alger. Two days later in his first league match, Bimenyimana scored his first goal against MC El Bayadh in a match that ended in a 2–1 defeat.

=== Jeddah ===
On 5 September 2025, Bimenyimana joined Saudi FDL club Jeddah.

== International goals ==
No.	Date	Venue	Opponent	Score	Result	Competition
1.	11 March 2017	Intwari Stadium, Bujumbura, Burundi	Djibouti	6–0	7–0	Friendly
2.	29 March 2022	Mardan Sports Complex, Aksu, Turkey	Libya	1–0	2–1	Friendly
3.	29 March 2022	Mardan Sports Complex, Aksu, Turkey	Libya	2–0	2–1	Friendly
4.	4 June 2022	Orlando Stadium, Johannesburg, South Africa	Namibia	1–1	1–1	2023 Africa Cup of Nations qualification
5.	20 June 2023	Benjamin Mkapa Stadium, Dar es Salaam, Tanzania	Namibia	2–0	3–2	2023 Africa Cup of Nations qualification
6.	25 March 2025	Meknes Honor Stadium, Meknes, Morocco	Seychelles	2–0	5–0	2026 FIFA World Cup qualification
7.	25 March 2025	Meknes Honor Stadium, Meknes, Morocco	Seychelles	3–0	5–0	2026 FIFA World Cup qualification
8.	17 November 2026	Intwari Stadium, Bujumbura, Burundi	Zambia	1–0	1–1	2027 Africa Cup of Nations qualification

== Personal life ==
According to his social media, Bimneyimana is a Christian.

== Honours ==
USM Alger

- Algerian Cup: 2024–25
