= Adler Da Silva =

Swiss footballer (born 1998)

Personal information
- Full name: Adler Da Silva Parreira
- Date of birth: 28 December 1998 (age 27)
- Place of birth: Geneva, Switzerland
- Height: 1.87 m (6 ft 2 in)
- Position: Forward

Team information
- Current team: Slovan Bratislava

Youth career
- –2012: FC Vernier
- 2012–2016: Servette

Senior career*
Years	Team	Apps	(Gls)
2015–2018	Servette II	29	(5)
2015–2016	Servette	21	(1)
2017	→ Étoile Carouge (loan)	10	(2)
2018	→ Grasshopper Zürich II (loan)	12	(0)
2018–2019	Sion II	24	(1)
2019–2020	Stade Nyonnais	22	(8)
2021–2022	Pohronie	16	(6)
2021–2022	→ Slovan Bratislava (loan)	17	(0)
2022–	Slovan Bratislava	3	(0)
2022	→ Zemplín Michalovce (loan)	17	(4)
2023–2024	→ Stal Rzeszów (loan)	16	(8)

International career
2015	Switzerland U17	2	(1)
2015–2016	Switzerland U18	5	(2)
2016	Switzerland U19	5	(0)
- * Club domestic league appearances and goals as of 00:45, 5 April 2024 (UTC)

Adler Da Silva Pereira (born 28 December 1998) is a Swiss professional footballer who plays as a forward for Slovak club Slovan Bratislava.

== Club career ==
=== Pohronie ===
In January 2021, Da Silva joined Pohronie on loan from Stade Nyon, with the Slovak first division club having the option to make the transfer permanent.

Da Silva made his Fortuna Liga debut for Pohronie on 6 February 2021, in a fixture played at neutral ground at Štadión pod Dubňom, against Nitra. He was featured in the starting line-up and opened the scoring sheet of the match in the 13th minute by converting a penalty set after a Kilian Pagliuca's foul against David Bangala. While Nitra equalised before the half-time through Pagliuca, Pohronie regained the lead through Andrej Štrba ten minutes before the conclusion. Da Silva scored his second goal in stoppage time by converting a counterattack, following an assist by Alieu Fadera, securing Pohronie's second win of the season. Overall, Da Silva greatly contributed to Pohronie in avoiding relegation by scoring six league goals. He became the club's top scorer of the season, tied with James Weir.

At the start of 2021–22 season, Da Silva remained goal-less and began some of the fixtures from the bench. His position in the club was made more difficult through the arrival of Miloš Lačný.

=== Slovan Bratislava ===
On 2 September 2021, reigning champions Slovan Bratislava had announced Da Silva's signing, on a year-long loan, followed by an automatic obligation to buy. Da Silva was acquired as a prospective offensive player to aid the club ahead of Europa Conference League combined with domestic duties.

==== Loan to Stal Rzeszów ====
On 4 September 2023, Da Silva joined Polish second division side Stal Rzeszów on a season-long loan, with an option to make the move permanent. He made his debut and first start eleven days later in a 0–1 home loss to Wisła Płock. He remained a regular occurrence in Stal's starting line-up throughout the 2023–24 campaign, before suffering a season-ending injury in a rematch against Wisła on 2 April 2024. He scored eight goals in 16 I liga appearances, as Stal decided not to activate the buy option.

== Honours ==
Slovan Bratislava

- Niké Liga: 2021–22, 2022–23

Individual

- I liga Player of the Month: November 2023
