= Oskar Fotr =

Czech footballer

Personal information
- Full name: Oskar Fotr
- Date of birth: 9 January 1996 (age 30)
- Place of birth: Prague, Czech Republic
- Height: 1.77 m (5 ft 10 in)
- Position: Forward

Team information
- Current team: SK Sparta Kolín
- Number: 22

Youth career
- –2014: Slavia Prague

Senior career*
Years	Team	Apps	(Gls)
2014–2017	Slavia Prague B		
2016–2017	→ Varnsdorf (loan)	23	(1)
2017–2020	Sellier & Bellot Vlašim	68	(16)
2020–2021	Senica	9	(1)
2021–2022	SV Stripfing	24	(10)
2022–	SK Sparta Kolín	11	(5)

International career
	Czech Republic U16	9	(5)
2012	Czech Republic U17	7	(2)
- * Club domestic league appearances and goals as of 7 January 2023

Oskar Fotr (born 9 January 1996) is a Czech footballer who plays for SK Sparta Kolín.

== Club career ==
=== FK Senica ===
Fotr made his Fortuna Liga debut for Senica against Ružomberok on 17 October 2020. Fotr came on to replace Tenton Yenne in the second half when Senica was one up. However, through two late goals by Štefan Gerec and José Carrillo (own goal), Senica lost the 1–2.

He scored his first goal for Senica during an away fixture against Pohronie on 24 October 2020. While Pohronie was leading through Dominik Špiriak, Fotr, who replaced Marko Totka at half-time, equalised in the 60th minute and Senica took the three points after a further strike by Tomáš Malec, leading to a 1–2 win.
