= Marek Frimmel =

Slovak footballer

Personal information
- Full name: Marek Frimmel
- Date of birth: 10 November 1992 (age 34)
- Place of birth: Bojnice, Czechoslovakia
- Height: 1.71 m (5 ft 7 in)
- Position: Winger

Team information
- Current team: SV Türnitz

Youth career
- –2010: Prievidza
- 2010–2011: Baník Horná Nitra

Senior career*
Years	Team	Apps	(Gls)
2011–2012	Baník Horná Nitra		
2012–2015	AS Trenčín	10	(0)
2014	→ Nové Mesto nad Váhom (loan)	14	(2)
2014–2015	→ Slovan Nemšová (loan)	31	(8)
2015–2018	Pohronie	110	(28)
2019–2020	Skalica	30	(2)
2020–2021	Dukla Banská Bystrica	27	(2)
2021–2022	Rohožník	28	(6)
2022–2023	SV Hollenburg	27	(13)
2023–	SV Türnitz	12	(2)
- * Club domestic league appearances and goals as of 22:38, 9 January 2024 (UTC)

Marek Frimmel (born 10 November 1992) is a Slovak football forward who currently plays for lower division Austrian clubs.

== Career ==
=== AS Trenčín ===
He made his debut for AS Trenčín against Slovan Bratislava on 25 August 2012.

=== MFK Skalica ===
On 29 December 2018 it was confirmed, that Frimmel had signed for Skalica.

== Career statistics ==
As of 26 May 2013

Club performance			League		Cup		Continental		Total	
Season	Club	League	Apps	Goals	Apps	Goals	Apps	Goals	Apps	Goals
Slovakia			League		Slovak Cup		Europe		Total	
2012–13	AS Trenčín	Corgoň Liga	10	0	2	0	0	0	12	0
Career total			10	0	2	0	0	0	12	0
