= Ismar Tandir =

Footballer (born 1995)

Personal information
- Date of birth: 19 August 1995 (age 31)
- Place of birth: Frankfurt, Germany.
- Height: 1.96 m (6 ft 5 in)
- Position: Forward

Youth career
- 2010–2013: New York Red Bulls

Senior career*
Years	Team	Apps	(Gls)
2013–2014	Sochaux B	19	(11)
2014	Sacramento Republic	1	(0)
2015	Breiðablik	3	(1)
2016	Deportivo Aragón		
2016	Javor Ivanjica	4	(0)
2017	Sloboda Tuzla	18	(3)
2018	Frýdek-Místek	9	(5)
2018–2019	Ružomberok	19	(9)
2019–2020	Sigma Olomouc	6	(2)
2020	→ Pohronie (loan)	5	(0)
2020–2021	Zemplín Michalovce	21	(3)
2021–2022	Mohammedan	0	(0)

International career
2012–2014	Bosnia and Herzegovina U19	14	(2)
2014	Bosnia and Herzegovina U21	1	(0)
- * Club domestic league appearances and goals as of 19:43, 22 May 2021 (UTC)

Ismar "Izzy" Tandir (born 19 August 1995), is a professional footballer who last played as a forward for Mohammedan in the I-League. Born in Germany, Tandir represented Bosnia and Herzegovina internationally.

== Club career ==
Born in Frankfurt, Germany, Tandir moved to the United States as a child. Tandir initially played in the New York Red Bulls Academy where he won two national championships, first with the U16 and then with U18 teams. He was the top scorer in the New York Red Bulls Academy in the last two seasons before moving to FC Sochaux in December 2012. At Sochaux, he scored 11 goals in 19 appearances for their B team.

Tandir signed his first professional contract with USL Pro club Sacramento Republic on 19 August 2014. He made one appearance for Sacramento. Next, he moved again to Europe, this time moving to Iceland and signing with Breiðablik on 12 March 2015. He made two appearances with Breiðablik in the 2015 Úrvalsdeild.

In December 2015 Tandir signed with Spanish side Deportivo Aragón, the reserve team of Real Zaragoza. On 15 July 2016, he signed a three-year contract with Serbian top-league side Javor Ivanjica.

=== MFK Ružomberok ===
On 11 July 2018, Tandir signed a three-year deal with Slovak Super League side MFK Ružomberok. He made his first ever debut in the Fortuna Liga for MFK Ružomberok against Sered that summer on 21 July 2018. He played from the start as a center forward and completed 90 minutes of the match.

Tandir had appeared 21 times for Ružomberok, nineteen times coming from the league and two times from Slovnaft cup. He scored 8 goals in 14 games for the first part of the season making him the silver boot behind Andraz Sporar.

=== Sigma Olomouc ===
On 17 July 2019, Tandir signed a two-year deal with Czech First League side Sigma Olomouc. His first appearance for Sigma Olomouc came on 20 July 2019 against FC Fastav Zlin at Andrův stadion. He came on in the 76th minute.

Tandir appeared six times for Sigma Olomouc with four of them coming in the League, the other two from MOL Cup. He scored in both fixtures in the MOL cup securing victory. After half a season in Sigma Olomouc Tandir was loaned out to Slovak Super League side FK Pohronie until 30 May 2020.

=== FK Pohronie ===
On 10 January 2020, it was announced that Tandir would return to Slovak Slovak Super Liga for a half-season loan at the season's novice club FK Pohronie, based in the town of Žiar nad Hronom. This was to be his second try in the league, following a spell at Ružomberok. During the winter friendlies, Tandir scored four goals.

Tandir made his league debut for Pohronie on 15 February 2020 against Nitra at pod Zoborom. The match concluded in a goal-less tie, with both teams being in a direct threat of relegation. He played from the start as a center forward along with Roland Gerebenits. He completed 90 minutes of the match.

=== MFK Zemplin Michalovce ===
On 5 October 2020, Tandir signed a deal with Slovak Super League side MFK Zemplin Michalovce until the end of the 2020–21 season, making it Tandir's third time coming back to the Slovak league.

Tandir's first appearance for MFK Zemplin Michalovce came against FC DAC 1904 Dunajská Streda at Mestsky Zempli on 17 October 2020. He started and played the full 90 minutes in a 4–2 loss. He recorded an assist.

Tandir appeared 19 times for MFK Zemplin Michalovce in the league recording three goals and four assists.

=== Mohamedan Sporting ===
On 22 December 2021, Tandir signed with Kolkata based club Mohamedan Sporting ahead of the team's 2021–22 I-League season.

== International career ==
Despite being born in Germany, Tandir has U.S. citizenship as well as Bosnian-Herzegovinian citizenship via his family roots. Bosnia called him into a U19 national team camp in 2012 for his first international experience. His performance in that camp, and others since then, had made him receive regular calls for Bosnia and Herzegovina youth teams.

== Honors ==
NY Red Bulls Academy

- U.S. Soccer Development Academy U16: 2011–12
- U.S. Soccer Development Academy U18: 2012–13

Breiðablik

- Icelandic League Cup: 2015
