= Jan Kameník =

Czech football manager

Personal information
- Date of birth: 25 January 1982 (age 44)
- Place of birth: Otrokovice, Czechoslovakia

Team information
- Current team: Czech Republic U21 (assistant)

Youth career
- 1992–1999: Baťov 1930
- 1999–2001: Sigma Olomouc

Senior career*
Years	Team	Apps	(Gls)
2001–2002	Baťov 1930		
2002–2004	FS Napajedla		
2004–2007	Jauerling		
2007–2010	FS Napajedla		
2010–2020	Vlčnov		
2020	Zlechov		

Managerial career
- 2007–2015: Slovácko (youth)
- 2015–2017: Jihlava (youth)
- 2017: Jihlava (assistant)
- 2017–2019: Fastav Zlín (assistant)
- 2019: Fastav Zlín
- 2019: Fastav Zlín (assistant)
- 2019–2020: Fastav Zlín
- 2020: Strání
- 2020–2021: Pohronie
- 2021–2022: Vysočina Jihlava
- 2023: Pohronie
- 2023–2025: Vyškov
- 2025–: Czech Republic U21 (assistant)
- 2025: Slovácko
- * Club domestic league appearances and goals

Jan Kameník (born 25 January 1982) is a Czech football manager.

== Playing career ==
In his youth years, Kameník featured for his local Otrokovice-based Baťov 1930 and had a two-year loan in Sigma Olomouc. He spent his senior career in lower amateur tiers of Czech league system, with his peak at a then-fourth division side TJ FS Napajedla. He often played recreational football for amateur sides. In early 2000s, he played in lower divisions of Austrian football.

== Managerial career ==
=== Youth teams ===
Kameník began his managerial career with Slovácko, where he spent 8 years with the youth squads. His tenure culminated by managing the U19 squad. While at Slovácko, Kameník attained his UEFA Pro Licence. Here he gained notoriety as a specialist in managing the youth squads.

He later relocated to serve as an authority within a regional football academy based ran by FAČR in Jihlava. While at the academy, Kameník was invited to coach the U19 squad at local Vysočina Jihlava. He stayed with the site for half-year.

=== Assistant in Jihlava ===
When the former assistant manager at Vysočina Jihlava, Michal Hipp departed from the club, Michal Bílek had invited Kameník to serve as his assistant. Kameník became the assistant in January 2017 but the duo was relieved of their duties by April, following a series of dissatisfactory results. He returned to the U19 squad briefly, but departed the club entirely by June.

=== Fastav Zlín ===
Ahead of the 2017–18 season, Kameník became the assistant of Bohumil Páník at Fastav Zlín. With Páník and his other assistant Jan Somberg, Kameník co-coached Zlín in the group stage of the UEFA Europa League and led them to victory at a pre-season Czechoslovak Supercup. Páník was replaced by Vlastimil Petržela in March 2018, after three years at the club. Kameník continued to serve as an assistant under Petržela, who remained with the club until the end of the season and departed after few minor controversies. Zlín narrowly avoided relegation that season.

At the start of 2018–19 season, Kameník had reunited with Michal Bílek who was named Zlín's new manager. The reunited duo, along with club's sporting director Zdeněk Grygera, began to pursue a play in a 3-5-2 formation. Despite initial success, the former Czech national team Bílek departed the club in winter, when he was named the manager of Kazakhstan. Bílek was replaced by Slovak manager Roman Pivarník, who kept Kameník as his assistant. Pivarník's side, however, recorded mere 9 points in eleven fixtures and failed to score in seven of those. Consequently, Pivarník was let go in April and Kameník took over as a manager of a senior team for the first time in his career, although merely on a caretaker basis, until the end of the season. Kameník had led the team during the Europa League play-offs to determine the final participant from the Czech Republic. Fastav advanced through Sigma Olomouc in the quarter-finals by the away goals rule but was knocked out in the semi-finals by Mladá Boleslav, who won the ultimate spot. He concluded his brief spell with a tally of two wins and two defeats.

Ahead of the 2019–20 season, Kameník was again degraded to a role of an assistant manager, this time serving under Josef Csaplár. Csaplár was too let go within half-year as, according to Grygera, he lacked the results, despite attracting a number of his former players. This time, however Kameník was promoted to a role of a manager by Grygera, in hopes of having a local manager improve the results, becoming league' youngest manager. Petr Slončík was named Kameník's assistant, after managing TVD Slavičín. Kameník's managerial spell concluded in March 2020. His spell saw three wins and three draws in league fixtures and a MOL Cup knock-out in Round of 16 by Mladá Boleslav. The results saw Zlín drop to a relegation zone and Kameník was subsequently replaced by the returning Bohumil Páník.

=== FC Strání ===
In September 2020, Kameník signed a contract with Fourth Division side Strání. At Strání, he re-united with numerous players from nearby Uherské Hradiště-based Slovácko. He led the team in five matches, with two wins and a draw.

=== FK Pohronie ===
In mid-October, Kameník was announced as a new manager of Pohronie, based in Žiar nad Hronom, Slovakia. Pohronie avoided relegation in their novice top-division season under Mikuláš Radványi, who kicked off the 2020–21 season as well. In early October, however, Pohronie had undergone a minor personal crisis: ex-captain Lukáš Pelegríni, local striker Patrik Abrahám, as well as Canadian pre-season arrival Ryan Lindsay. After these departures, sporting director Miroslav Filipko and manager Mikuláš Radványi were both subsequently released from the club. Kameník was brought in as a prospective coach with professional recommendations and marked a beginning of an internal transformation of the club.

Kameník had his managerial debut with Pohronie on 17 October 2020 in a fixture against AS Trenčín, at pod Dubňom, in a 1–1 tie. Despite being one-down at half time James Weir equalised with a second-half header. Immediately in the first match, Kameník restructured Pohronie to play in his preferred 3-5-2 formation, dropping the previously used 4–3–3.

=== MFK Vyškov ===
In April 2023, Kameník signed a contract with Czech National Football League side Vyškov.

=== Slovácko ===
On 5 June 2025, Kameník was appointed as manager of Czech First League club Slovácko.
