= Lukáš Tesák =

Slovak footballer

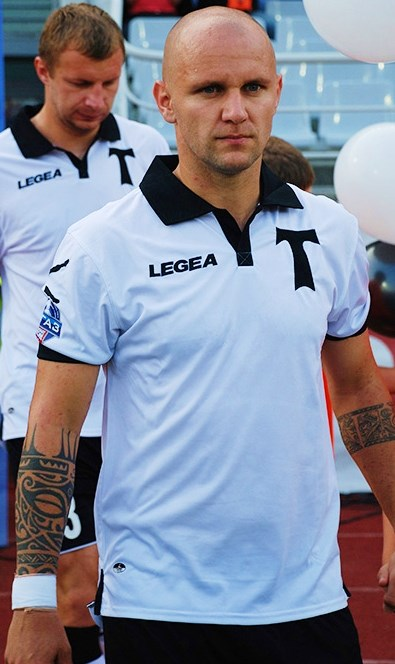

Personal information
- Date of birth: 8 March 1985 (age 41)
- Place of birth: Žiar nad Hronom, Czechoslovakia
- Height: 1.75 m (5 ft 9 in)
- Positions: Left back; left midfielder

Youth career
- Žiar nad Hronom

Senior career*
Years	Team	Apps	(Gls)
2005–2006	Dubnica		
2006–2007	Žilina		
2007–2008	Rimavská Sobota		
2008–2009	Žilina		
2009	Senica	14	(1)
2010	Tatran Prešov	9	(0)
2010–2012	Zorya Luhansk	33	(0)
2012–2014	Torpedo Moscow	71	(4)
2014–2015	Arsenal Tula	42	(0)
2016	Kairat	18	(1)
2016–2017	Arsenal Tula	12	(0)
2017	Gomel	13	(2)
2018–2019	Pohronie	48	(3)
2020–2021	Sitno Banská Štiavnica	8	(1)

International career
	Slovakia U21	2	(0)
2015–2016	Slovakia	4	(0)

Managerial career
- 2020–2021: Pohronie (fitness coach)
- * Club domestic league appearances and goals

Lukáš Tesák (born 8 March 1985) is a Slovak former professional international footballer who played as a left back or left midfielder.

Throughout his career, he has also played for Dubnica, Žilina, Rimavská Sobota, Senica and Tatran Prešov in Slovakia, Ukrainian club Zorya Luhansk, Russian clubs Torpedo Moscow and Arsenal Tula, as well as Belarusian Gomel.

== Career ==
=== Club career ===
In February 2016, Tesák signed a two-year contract, with the option of an additional year, with Kazakhstan Premier League side Kairat. In July of the same year, Tesák left FC Kairat, re-signing for Arsenal Tula a few days later. On 28 February 2017, FC Arsenal Tula removed him from their Russian Premier League roster.

=== Later career ===
In August 2020, he signed with an amateur club Sitno Banská Štiavnica.

== Coaching career ==
After retiring at the end of 2019, it was confirmed in January 2020, that Tesák would continue at Pohronie as a fitness coach. He had resigned from this position in January 2021 to pursue a civilian career.
