= Petr Galuška =

Czech footballer

Personal information
- Full name: Petr Galuška
- Date of birth: 8 July 1996 (age 30)
- Place of birth: Blatnice pod Svatým Antonínkem, Czech Republic
- Height: 1.83 m (6 ft 0 in)
- Position: Winger

Team information
- Current team: SK Posázavan Poříčí nad Sázavou

Youth career
- 2004–2006: FK Blatnice pod Svatým Antonínkem
- 2006–2009: FC Veselí nad Moravou
- 2009–2015: Slovácko

Senior career*
Years	Team	Apps	(Gls)
2014–2016	Slovácko	3	(0)
2016–	Karviná	27	(3)
2017	→ Viktoria Žižkov (loan)	11	(1)
2020	→ Jastrzębie (loan)	13	(1)
2020	→ Slavoj Vyšehrad (loan)	3	(0)
2021	Pohronie	14	(0)
2021	Hodonín	12	(2)
2022–	SK Posázavan Poříčí nad Sázavou	58	(32)

International career
2011–2012	Czech Republic U16	13	(0)
2012–2013	Czech Republic U17	10	(3)
2013	Czech Republic U18	7	(0)
2014–2015	Czech Republic U19	9	(0)
2016	Czech Republic U20	1	(0)
- * Club domestic league appearances and goals as of 22:48, 9 January 2024 (UTC)

Petr Galuška (born 8 July 1996) is a Czech professional footballer who plays as a winger for SK Posázavan Poříčí nad Sázavou. He previously played for Slovácko and Karviná in the Czech First League and Pohronie in the Fortuna Liga.
