= Jozef Špyrka =

Slovak footballer

Personal information
- Full name: Jozef Špyrka
- Date of birth: 30 May 1999 (age 27)
- Place of birth: Prešov, Slovakia
- Position: Midfielder

Team information
- Current team: Pohronie
- Number: 10

Youth career
- 2008–2010: OŠK Sokol Chminianska Nová Ves
- 2010–2016: Tatran Prešov

Senior career*
Years	Team	Apps	(Gls)
2015–2018	Tatran Prešov	11	(0)
2018	Pohronie	17	(1)
2019–2024	Železiarne Podbrezová	99	(15)
2024	→ Tatran Prešov (loan)	13	(6)
2024	→ Komárno (loan)	13	(0)
2025–	Pohronie	36	(13)

International career^{‡}
2016–2017	Slovakia U18	10	(1)
2019	Slovakia U21	6	(1)
- * Club domestic league appearances and goals as of 17 May 2026 ‡ National team caps and goals as of 18 November 2019

Jozef Špyrka (born 30 May 1999) is a Slovak professional footballer who plays as a midfielder for Pohronie.

== Club career ==
=== Tatran Prešov ===
Špyrka made his professional Fortuna Liga debut for Tatran Prešov against ŽP Šport Podbrezová on 10 December 2016.
