= Mohammed Sallah (footballer, born 2006) =

Gambian footballer (born 2006)

Personal information
- Date of birth: 17 February 2006 (age 20)
- Place of birth: The Gambia
- Position: Midfielder

Team information
- Current team: FK Pohronie

Senior career*
Years	Team	Apps	(Gls)
2025	Team Rhino		
2025–2026	Železiarne Podbrezová	7	(0)
2026–	FK Pohronie	3	(0)
- * Club domestic league appearances and goals as of 06:20, 26 March 2026 (UTC)

Mohammed Sallah (born 17 February 2006) is a Gambian professional footballer who plays for Slovak second division club FK Pohronie, as a midfielder.

Sallah started his career at local club Team Rhino FC, where he captained the club from a young age. After good performances he joined Slovak first league side FK Železiarne Podbrezová, where he debuted for in July 2025. After being unable to find a spot in the squad, Sallah transferred to FK Pohronie.

== Career ==
=== Early career ===
As a youth player, Sallah played in the middle of the field as a defensive midfielder. He previously played in the Gambian top flight for Team Rhino FC. There was also interest in his signature from other European clubs. Despite his young age, he was the captain of his former club.

=== Podbrezová ===
On 17 February 2025, it was announced that Sallah would be joining Slovak club FK Železiarne Podbrezová, signing a two-year contract. He started training with the club in May 2025. He made his professional debut for the club in a 3–1 win over FC Košice, coming on off the bench as a substitute in the 90th minute for Andrii Havrylenko. Sallah’s next appearance would be in a 4–1 loss against league champions Slovan Bratislava, in the 28 minutes that he played, he was not able to affect the final score. Sallah got his first start in the first division in a 2–2 draw against league newcomers Tatran Presov, playing the first 45 minutes before being subbed off.

=== FK Pohronie ===
After being unable to settle himself in Podbrezová, it was announced on 22 February 2026, that Sallah had joined Slovak second division side FK Pohronie, signing alongside Alin Lérint. He debuted for the club on 22 March 2026 in a 1–1 draw against Slávia TU Košice in the 21 round of the league.
