= Yusuf Mainge =

Kenyan footballer (born 1999)

Personal information
- Full name: Yusuf Nasri Mainge
- Date of birth: 26 December 1999 (age 26)
- Place of birth: Kenya
- Position: Right-back

Team information
- Current team: Gor Mahia

Youth career
- –2019: Leopards

Senior career*
Years	Team	Apps	(Gls)
2018–2021	Leopards		
2019–2020	→ Pohronie (loan)	3	(0)
2021–	Gor Mahia		

International career^{‡}
2019–	Kenya U23	4	(0)
2019–	Kenya	1	(0)
- * Club domestic league appearances and goals as of 19 July 2020 ‡ National team caps and goals as of 8 April 2020

Yusuf Mainge (born 26 December 1999) is a Kenyan footballer who plays as a defender for Gor Mahia.

== Club career ==
=== FK Pohronie ===
Prior to his league debut, Mainge appeared in a Slovnaft Cup fixture against 5th league side ŠK Selce. He came on as a second-half replacement for Michal Klec during the 9:0 victory.

Mainge made his professional Fortuna Liga debut for Pohronie against Žilina on 21 September 2019. Žilina were leading the league table, at that point. Mainge was booked with a yellow card in the first half and had played for 80 minutes before being replaced by András Mészáros, in an effort to score an equalising goal. After goals against by Filip Kaša and Slovak international Róbert Boženík, Pohronie lost the game 1:2. He was also featured in the following league games against Senica and Zemplín Michalovce and a Cup fixture against Rakytovce.

Mainge made no appearances in the spring and did not return to the squad following the league disruption caused by the COVID-19 pandemic. He also cited personal reasons as for his decision to return to native Kenya. Nonetheless, Mainge stated thankfulness and wished the Žiar nad Hronom-based club the best of luck.

== International career ==
Mainge played in four 2019 Cup of Nations qualifiers against Mauritius U23 and Sudan U23. He was also the captain of the U23 side.

In October 2019, Mainge made his debut for Kenya during a friendly match against Mozambique. The match concluded in a 0:1 defeat.

== Personal life ==
Per his social media communication, Mainge adheres to Islam.
