= Erik Kramár =

Slovak footballer (born 2001)

Personal information
- Full name: Erik Kramár
- Date of birth: 12 July 2001 (age 25)
- Place of birth: Zlaté Moravce, Slovakia
- Position: Defender

Team information
- Current team: Baník Prievidza

Youth career
- 2009–2011: ViOn Zlaté Moravce
- 2011–2018: Nitra
- 2016: → ViOn Zlaté Moravce (loan)
- 2018–2020: Zbrojovka Brno

Senior career*
Years	Team	Apps	(Gls)
2020	Pohronie	0	(0)
2021	Kisvárda II	15	(0)
2021–2023	Dubnica	55	(1)
2023–2024	Slovan Bratislava B	16	(1)
2024–2026	Stará Ľubovňa	41	(3)
2026–	Baník Prievidza	0	(0)
- * Club domestic league appearances and goals as of 13 March 2026

Erik Kramár (born 12 July 2001) is a Slovak footballer who plays for Slovak 3. Liga club Baník Prievidza as a defender.

== Career ==
=== FK Pohronie ===
Kramár joined Pohronie in the summer of 2020 as his first club in senior football, having previously played for youth categories of ViOn Zlaté Moravce, Nitra and lastly Zbrojovka Brno, where he made frequent appearances in the U19 squad. According to Kramár, Pohronie had shown interest back in the winter of 2020. He opted for Pohronie following his return from the Czech Republic caused by the COVID-19 pandemic and a feasible opportunity to play at the Žiar nad Hronom-based club. He departed from the club in January 2021 without making a single appearance.

== International career ==
=== U19 team ===
Manager of the Slovak U19 team Albert Rusnák had repeatedly nominated Kramár for preparatory camps and unofficial fixtures during the 2019/20 season. He was also listed as a replacement in the nomination for two official youth international friendly fixtures against Cyprus and Latvia.
