= Mário Mrva =

Slovak footballer

Personal information
- Full name: Mário Mrva
- Date of birth: 16 February 1999 (age 27)
- Place of birth: Ružomberok, Slovakia
- Height: 1.90 m (6 ft 3 in)
- Position: Centre-back

Team information
- Current team: FK Pohronie

Youth career
- –2009: OŠK Bešeňová
- 2009–2012: OŠK Ivachnová
- 2012–2016: Ružomberok

Senior career*
Years	Team	Apps	(Gls)
2017–2020	Ružomberok B	41	(2)
2019–2024	Ružomberok	81	(2)
2024–	FK Železiarne Podbrezová	15	(1)
2025–2026	Zlaté Moravce	44	(4)
2026-	FK Pohronie	0	(0)

International career
2017	Slovakia U18	4	(0)
- * Club domestic league appearances and goals as of 15 Jun 2026

Mário Mrva (born 16 February 1999) is a Slovak professional footballer who plays for FK Pohronie as a defender.

== Club career ==
=== MFK Ružomberok ===
Mrva made his Fortuna Liga debut for Ružomberok at City Aréna against Spartak Trnava on 29 November 2019. He had completed the entire fixture which had concluded with a 2:0 defeat, after two goals by Kubilay Yilmaz.
