= Ján Šafranko =

Slovak footballer

Personal information
- Full name: Ján Šafranko
- Date of birth: 15 August 1975 (age 51)
- Place of birth: Svidník, Czechoslovakia
- Height: 1.76 m (5 ft 9 1/2 in)
- Position: Midfielder

Youth career
- MŠK Tesla Stropkov

Senior career*
Years	Team	Apps	(Gls)
- MŠK Tesla Stropkov
- Ozeta Dukla Trenčín
- Inter Bratislava
? – 2001 – ?	SCP Ružomberok		
- Liepaja
- Michalovce
?–2008	Penang FA		
2008–2009	Tatran Prešov		
2009	Olympiakos Nicosia		
2009–2010	Partizán Bardejov		
2010	1. FC Tatran Prešov		
Total		194	(23)
- * Club domestic league appearances and goals as of 28 August 2010 ‡ National team caps and goals as of 28 August 2010

Ján Šafranko (born 15 August 1975 in Svidník) is a former Slovak football player who recently played for 1. FC Tatran Prešov .
