= Ondřej Chvěja =

Czech footballer

Personal information
- Full name: Ondřej Chvěja
- Date of birth: 17 July 1998 (age 28)
- Place of birth: Hlučín, Czech Republic
- Height: 1.85 m (6 ft 1 in)
- Position: Midfielder

Team information
- Current team: Baník Ostrava B
- Number: 15

Youth career
- Baník Ostrava

Senior career*
| Years | Team | Apps | (Gls) |
| 2016–2023 | Baník Ostrava | 10 | (1) |
| 2017–2018 | → Frýdek-Místek (loan) | 22 | (1) |
| 2019 | → Vítkovice (loan) | 12 | (1) |
| 2021 | → Pohronie (loan) | 15 | (5) |
| 2022 | → Karviná (loan) | 10 | (0) |
| 2022–2023 | → Pardubice (loan) | 2 | (0) |
| 2023 | → Prostějov (loan) | 14 | (1) |
| 2023– | Baník Ostrava B | 43 | (13) |

International career^{‡}
| 2014 | Czech Republic U16 | 3 | (1) |
| 2015–2016 | Czech Republic U18 | 5 | (0) |
| 2016–2017 | Czech Republic U19 | 14 | (2) |
- * Club domestic league appearances and goals as of 20 June 2025 ‡ National team caps and goals as of 29 January 2021

Ondřej Chvěja (born 17 July 1998) is a Czech footballer who plays for Baník Ostrava.
