= FK Žiar nad Hronom =

- Full name: FK Žiar nad Hronom – Ladomerská Vieska
- Founded: 1929; 97 years ago
- Dissolved: 2012 (Note: Merged with Sokol Dolná Ždaňa to form FK Pohronie.)
- Ground: Mestský štadión Žiar nad Hronom, Žiar nad Hronom
- Capacity: 12,910 (910 seated)
Home colours

FK Žiar nad Hronom was a Slovak football team, based in the town of Žiar nad Hronom. The club was founded in 1929. In the summer of 2012, FK Žiar nad Hronom merged with TJ Sokol Dolná Ždaňa to form FK Pohronie.

The club's most notable result on a national level was an achieving the semi-final stage of the Slovak Cup in 2001.

== Notable players ==
Had international caps for their respective countries. Players whose name is listed in bold represented their countries while playing for FK. Players whose name is listed in italics played for the club in junior teams only.

- (Slovakia) Ľubomír Michalík
- (Slovakia) Adam Nemec
- (Czechoslovakia) Milan Nemec
- (Slovakia) Milan Škriniar
- (Slovakia) Lukáš Tesák
