= Michal Obročník =

Slovak footballer

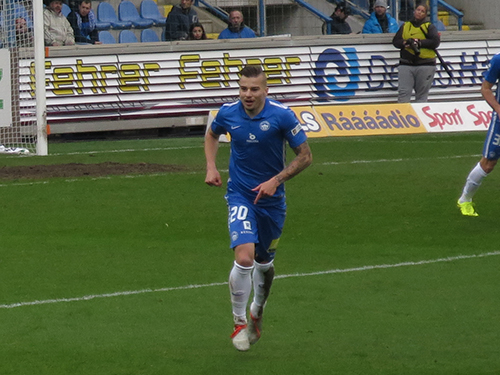

Personal information
- Full name: Michal Obročník
- Date of birth: 4 June 1991 (age 35)
- Place of birth: Rimavská Sobota, Czechoslovakia
- Height: 1.76 m (5 ft 9 in)
- Position: Defensive midfielder

Team information
- Current team: Nové Zámky

Youth career
- 1997–2006: Rimavská Sobota
- 2006–2010: Dukla Banská Bystrica

Senior career*
Years	Team	Apps	(Gls)
2010–2012	Rimavská Sobota	56	(2)
2012–2013	ViOn Zlaté Moravce	47	(2)
2014–2018	Slovan Liberec	37	(1)
2016–2017	→ ViOn Zlaté Moravce (loan)	15	(0)
2017	→ Sigma Olomouc (loan)	7	(0)
2018–2019	Železiarne Podbrezová	28	(3)
2019	Chojniczanka Chojnice	15	(1)
2020	Pohronie	12	(0)
2021–2022	Petržalka	33	(5)
2023	ASV Siegendorf	7	(0)
2023–2024	USC Biberbach	9	(0)
2023–	Nové Zámky		
- * Club domestic league appearances and goals as of 10:44, 4 June 2024 (UTC)

Michal Obročník (born 4 June 1991) is a Slovak professional footballer who plays as a midfielder for Nové Zámky.

== Career ==
=== ViOn Zlaté Moravce ===
He made his debut for ViOn Zlaté Moravce against Ružomberok on 14 July 2012.

=== Slovan Liberec ===
In January 2014, Obročník came to Czech club Slovan Liberec.

=== Pohronie ===
On 31 January 2020, Pohronie has announced that signing of Obročník, along with the signing of Jacy. In a later interview, Obročník explained that his early departure from Polish Chojniczanka Chojnice was caused by club's financial troubles and delayed wage payments. He returned to Slovakia as the contract with Chojniczanka forbade him from signing with another Polish club.

Obročník made his debut in the Fortuna Liga in the first round of the spring half of the season. On 15 February 2020, at pod Zoborom, Obročník was fielded in the starting line-up of a goal-less tie against Nitra. Despite making a couple of minor erroneous decisions in the play, particularly during the first half, he completed the entirety of the match.

On 8 March 2020, in an away fixture against Zemplín Michalovce (0:1 loss), Obročník had suffered a leg injury and had to be replaced by Richard Župa in the first half. The injury had ruled him out of play for just one game of the relegation group fixtures, as the season was delayed and shortened due to the coronavirus pandemic. However he remained benched all the remaining games of the season.

After the season, Obročník had departed from Pohronie, recording a total of four appearances. However, he resigned later during the autumn of 2020 and recorded 8 further appearances in the 2020–21 season before being released again in January 2021.

== Honours ==
Slovan Liberec

- Czech Cup: 2014–15
