= Miroslav Filipko =

Slovak footballer

Personal information
- Full name: Miroslav Filipko
- Date of birth: 23 September 1973 (age 53)
- Place of birth: Banská Bystrica, Czechoslovakia
- Height: 1.89 m (6 ft 2 in)
- Position: Goalkeeper

Youth career
- 1983–1992: Dukla Banská Bystrica

Senior career*
Years	Team	Apps	(Gls)
1992–1993	Martin		
1993–1994	Ružomberok		
1994–1997	Spartak Trnava	6	(0)
1998–2000	Petržalka		
2000–2002	Hapoel Rishon LeZion		
2002–2004	Hapoel Tzafririm Holon		
2004–2006	Dynamo České Budějovice	59	(0)
2007–2008	Iraklis	5	(0)
2008–2012	Slovácko	93	(0)
2012–2014	Spartak Trnava	20	(0)
2014–2015	Petržalka akadémia		

Managerial career
- 2019–2020: Pohronie (sports director)
- * Club domestic league appearances and goals as of 27 August 2014

Miroslav Filipko (born 23 September 1973) is a Slovak former football goalkeeper currently Sport Director of Pohronie.

== Club career ==
He returned to Spartak Trnava in June 2012.
