= Ján Hatok =

Slovak footballer

Personal information
- Full name: Ján Hatok
- Date of birth: 11 July 1990 (age 36)
- Place of birth: Prešov, Czechoslovakia
- Height: 1.76 m (5 ft 9 in)
- Position: Right-back

Team information
- Current team: TJ Petrovany
- Number: 10

Youth career
- Tatran Prešov

Senior career*
Years	Team	Apps	(Gls)
−2013	Tatran Prešov B		
2012−2013	→ Vranov nad Topľou (loan)		
2013−2014	Tatran Prešov	21	(0)
2014−2015	Karviná	18	(0)
2015−2016	Pohronie	21	(0)
2016−2018	Poprad	51	(2)
2018−2020	Pohronie	39	(0)
2020	Tatran Prešov	8	(0)
2021	Humenné	14	(0)
2022−2023	Tatran Prešov	13	(0)
2023−	TJ Petrovany	10	(5)

Managerial career
- 2023–: TJ Petrovany (player-coach)
- * Club domestic league appearances and goals as of 23:26, 9 January 2024 (UTC)

Ján Hatok (born 11 July 1990) is a Slovak professional footballer and manager who plays as a right-back.

== Club career ==
Hatok made his Fortuna Liga debut for Pohronie against Slovan Bratislava on 20 July 2019
