= Dominik Špiriak =

Slovak football defender

Personal information
- Full name: Dominik Špiriak
- Date of birth: 22 March 1999 (age 27)
- Place of birth: Bratislava, Slovakia
- Height: 1.84 m (6 ft 0 in)
- Position: Centre-back

Team information
- Current team: Komárno
- Number: 5

Youth career
- 2004–2016: Senec
- 2016–2017: Dunajská Streda

Senior career*
Years	Team	Apps	(Gls)
2015–2016	Senec	1	(0)
2017–2020	Dunajská Streda	2	(0)
2018	→ Komárno (loan)	12	(0)
2019	→ Zemplín Michalovce (loan)	7	(0)
2019–2020	→ Ergotelis (loan)	12	(0)
2020–2021	Pohronie	28	(1)
2022–	Komárno	107	(0)

International career
- Slovakia U15
- Slovakia U16
2015–2016	Slovakia U17	7	(0)
2017	Slovakia U18	8	(0)
2017–2018	Slovakia U19	10	(0)
2018	Slovakia U20	3	(0)
2019–2020	Slovakia U21	3	(0)
- * Club domestic league appearances and goals as of 22 September 2026

Dominik Špiriak (born 22 March 1999) is a Slovak professional footballer who plays as a centre-back for KFC Komárno in the Slovak Niké liga.

== Club career ==
Špiriak began his football career at ŠK Senec, where he signed his first professional contract during the 2015–16 season. In 2016, he moved to Dunajská Streda, where he started in their youth team. During his time with Dunajská Streda, he was loaned out to fellow Slovak sides Komárno and Zemplín Michalovce. In July 2019, Špiriak was loaned out to Greek Super League 2 side Ergotelis for the duration of the 2019–20 season. In July 2020, Špiriak signed with Pohronie.
