= Patrik Blahút =

Slovak footballer

Personal information
- Full name: Patrik Blahút
- Date of birth: 7 October 1997 (age 29)
- Place of birth: Voznica, Slovakia
- Position: Right midfielder

Team information
- Current team: Slovácko
- Number: 15

Youth career
- 2005–2012: ŠK Voznica
- 2012–2015: Pohronie

Senior career*
Years	Team	Apps	(Gls)
2015–2022	Pohronie	201	(21)
2023–	Železiarne Podbrezová	28	(7)
2024	→ Slovácko (loan)	15	(0)
2024–	Slovácko	62	(5)
- * Club domestic league appearances and goals as of 25 May 2026

Patrik Blahút (born 7 October 1997) is a Slovak professional footballer who currently plays as a midfielder for Slovácko in the Czech First League.

== Club career ==
=== FK Pohronie ===
Blahút made his Fortuna Liga debut for Pohronie in the club's premier first division match against Slovan Bratislava on 20 July 2019 at Mestský štadión.

=== 1. FC Slovácko ===
On 18 January 2024, Blahút signed a half-year loan deal with an option-to-buy with Slovácko, joining the team during winter training camp in Turkey.
