= Peter Mazan =

Slovak footballer

Personal information
- Full name: Peter Mazan
- Date of birth: 13 May 1990 (age 36)
- Place of birth: Bojnice, Czechoslovakia
- Height: 1.73 m (5 ft 8 in)
- Position: Attacking midfielder

Team information
- Current team: FC Petržalka
- Number: 10

Youth career
- 1995–2005: Prievidza
- 2005–2009: AS Trenčín

Senior career*
Years	Team	Apps	(Gls)
2009–2016	AS Trenčín	112	(11)
2013–2014	→ ViOn Zlaté Moravce (loan)	24	(1)
2014	→ Dukla Banská Bystrica (loan)	11	(4)
2015	→ ViOn Zlaté Moravce (loan)	12	(1)
2015–2016	→ Skalica (loan)	27	(1)
2016–2017	Raków Częstochowa	24	(3)
2017–2019	Radomiak Radom	33	(9)
2019–2021	Pohronie	65	(5)
2022	Dukla Banská Bystrica	15	(4)
2023–2024	Pohronie	42	(19)
2024-	FC Petržalka	23	(2)

International career
2011–2012	Slovakia U21		
- * Club domestic league appearances and goals as of 25 May 2026

Peter Mazan (born 13 May 1990) is a Slovak professional footballer who plays as an attacking midfielder for FC Petržalka.

In the summer of 2021, he became the captain of Pohronie, but was released in January 2022.

He previously played for Dukla Banská Bystrica, AS Trenčín or Raków Częstochowa.

== Career statistics ==
As of 26 May 2013

Club performance			League		Cup		Continental		Total	
Season	Club	League	Apps	Goals	Apps	Goals	Apps	Goals	Apps	Goals
Slovakia			League		Slovak Cup		Europe		Total	
2009–10	AS Trenčín	2. liga	21	1	2	0	0	0	23	1
2010–11	AS Trenčín	2. liga	30	2	3	0	0	0	33	2
2011–12	AS Trenčín	Corgoň Liga	29	5	2	0	0	0	31	5
2012–13	AS Trenčín	Corgoň Liga	29	3	2	0	0	0	31	3
Career total			111	11	9	0	0	0	120	11

== Honours ==
Raków Częstochowa

- II liga: 2016–17

Radomiak Radom

- II liga: 2018–19
