= Patrik Abrahám =

Slovak footballer (born 1991)

Personal information
- Full name: Patrik Abrahám
- Date of birth: 10 December 1991 (age 34)
- Place of birth: Stará Kremnička, Czechoslovakia
- Position: Midfielder

Team information
- Current team: RSC Hamsik Academy
- Number: 7

Youth career
- –2008: OŠK Stará Kremnička
- 2008–2010: → Žiar nad Hronom (loan)

Senior career*
Years	Team	Apps	(Gls)
2008–2011	Žiar nad Hronom (loan)		
2012	Dubnica (loan)	4	(1)
2012–2015	Pohronie (loan)	76	(26)
2016	Sereď (loan)	12	(5)
2016	Spartak Myjava	7	(0)
2017–2018	Nitra	25	(4)
2018	Skalica	17	(3)
2019–2020	Pohronie	33	(11)
2021–2022	Komárno	34	(5)
2022	Pohronie	17	(2)
2023–2024	Hamsik Academy	27	(15)
2025	MFK Zvolen	11	(2)
2025-	TJ Lovča	0	(0)
- * Club domestic league appearances and goals as of 19:08, 9 January 2024 (UTC)

Patrik Abrahám (born 10 December 1991) is a Slovak footballer who currently plays for TJ Lovča as a midfielder.

== Career ==
=== Spartak Myjava ===
Abrahám made his Fortuna Liga debut for Spartak Myjava against ViOn Zlaté Moravce on 16 July 2016.

=== MFK Skalica ===
Skalica announced the signing of Abrahám in July 2018, but he left the club again at the end of the year.

=== FK Pohronie ===
After his departure from Skalica, he re-joined Pohronie in January 2019. A club from his region of origin. Pohronie topped the league table of 2. Liga before the winter break. The success of the squad encouraged departure of multiple leading players, particularly to Železiarne Podbrezová, where one of Pohronie's administrative team had moved, or even to Poland. Abrahám was therefore brought as the replacement.

During the autumn of 2020 Abrahám was relegated to the B-team by Miroslav Filipko, the sporting director, amidst accusations of racism. During the winter he departed from Pohronie and joined KFC Komárno of 2. Liga.

After a 1.5 year long spell with Komárno, Abrahám returned to Pohronie as a part of Spät ku koreňom (Back to Roots) campaign.
