= Kilian Pagliuca =

Swiss footballer (born 1996)

Personal information
- Date of birth: 2 September 1996 (age 30)
- Place of birth: Chêne-Bougeries, Switzerland
- Height: 1.88 m (6 ft 2 in)
- Position: Forward

Team information
- Current team: Grand-Saconnex
- Number: 28

Youth career
- 2004–2008: FC Meyrin
- 2008–2012: Servette
- 2012–2013: Olympique Lyon

Senior career*
Years	Team	Apps	(Gls)
2013–2016	Olympique Lyon B	24	(2)
2016–2019	Zürich II	12	(4)
2016–2017	→ FC Wohlen (loan)	12	(2)
2017–2018	→ FC Wohlen (loan)	16	(3)
2018–2019	→ Hallescher FC (loan)	21	(2)
2019–2020	Carl Zeiss Jena	18	(2)
2019–2020	Carl Zeiss Jena II	3	(2)
2021	Nitra	4	(1)
2021–2023	Chemnitzer FC	64	(13)
2023–2024	Alemannia Aachen	22	(4)
2024–2025	MSV Duisburg	10	(1)
2026–	Grand-Saconnex	14	(3)

International career
2011	Switzerland U15	3	(1)
2011	Switzerland U16	3	(1)
2012–2013	Switzerland U17	14	(3)
2013–2014	Switzerland U18	7	(4)
2014–2016	Switzerland U19	10	(4)
- * Club domestic league appearances and goals as of 26 June 2026

Kilian Pagliuca (born 2 September 1996) is a Swiss footballer who plays as a forward for Swiss Promotion League club Grand-Saconnex.

== Career statistics ==
As of 26 June 2026

Appearances and goals by club, season and competition
Club	Season	League			National cup		Total	
Club	Season	Division	Apps	Goals	Apps	Goals	Apps	Goals
Olympique Lyon B	2013–14	Championnat National 2	6	2	—		6	2
Olympique Lyon B	2014–15	Championnat National 2	7	0	—		7	0
Olympique Lyon B	2015–16	Championnat National 2	11	0	—		11	0
Olympique Lyon B	Total		24	2	—		24	2
FC Wohlen (loan)	2016–17	Swiss Challenge League	12	2	—		12	2
Zürich II	2017–18	Swiss Promotion League	12	4	—		12	4
FC Wohlen (loan)	2017–18	Swiss Challenge League	16	3	—		16	3
Hallescher FC	2018–19	3. Liga	21	2	—		21	2
Carl Zeiss Jena	2019–20	3. Liga	18	2	—		18	2
Carl Zeiss Jena II	2019–20	NOFV-Oberliga	3	2	—		3	2
FC Nitra	2020–21	Slovak First Football League	4	0	—		4	0
Chemnitzer FC	2021–22	Regionalliga Nordost	33	9	—		33	9
Chemnitzer FC	2022–23	Regionalliga Nordost	31	4	1	0	32	4
Chemnitzer FC	Total		64	13	1	0	65	13
Alemannia Aachen	2023–24	Regionalliga West	22	4	—		22	4
MSV Duisburg	2024–25	Regionalliga West	10	1	—		10	1
FC Grand-Saconnex	2025–26	Swiss Promotion League	14	3	—		14	3
Career total			220	38	1	0	221	39
