= Tomáš Jenčo =

Slovak footballer

Personal information
- Full name: Tomáš Jenčo
- Date of birth: 29 September 1988 (age 38)
- Place of birth: Svidník, Czechoslovakia
- Height: 1.82 m (5 ft 11 1/2 in)
- Position: Goalkeeper

Team information
- Current team: Novohrad Lučenec
- Number: 1

Youth career
- Tesla Stropkov

Senior career*
Years	Team	Apps	(Gls)
2009–2012	→ Petržalka 1898 (loan)	83	(0)
2012–2015	Zemplín Michalovce	30	(0)
2014	→ Baník Ružiná (loan)	15	(0)
2014–2015	→ Lokomotíva Zvolen (loan)	27	(0)
2015–2017	Lokomotíva Zvolen	61	(0)
2018–2021	Pohronie	74	(0)
2021–	Novohrad Lučenec	72	(0)
- * Club domestic league appearances and goals as of 11:30, 10 January 2024 (UTC)

Tomáš Jenčo (born 29 September 1988) is a Slovak football goalkeeper who plays for Novohrad Lučenec in 3. Liga - East .

He previously played for Lokomotíva Zvolen, Zemplín Michalovce and Petržalka 1898.
