= ViOn Aréna =

Football stadium in Zlaté Moravce, Slovakia

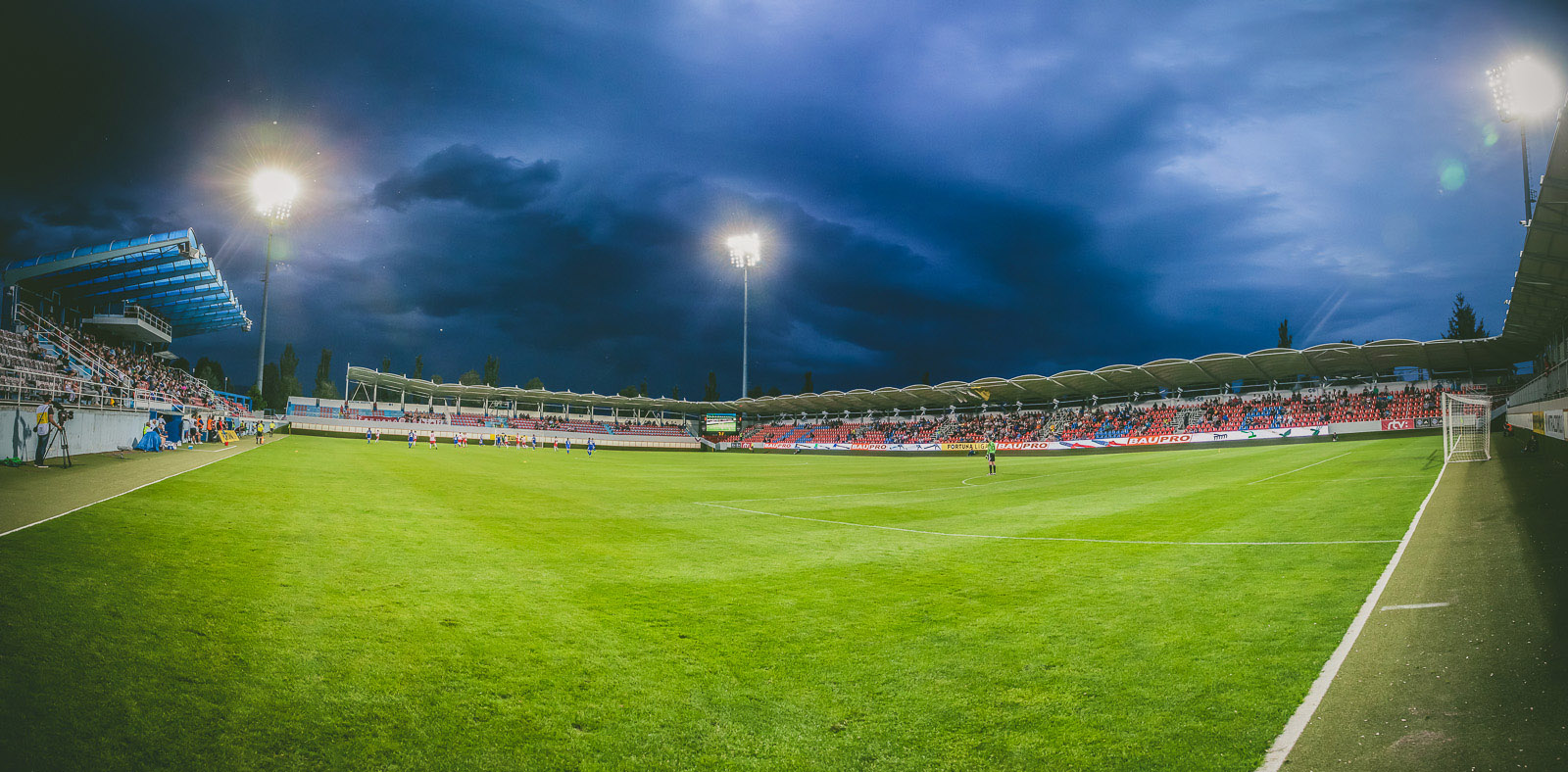
- UEFA
- Interactive map of ViOn Aréna
- Location: Továrenská 64, Zlaté Moravce, Slovakia
- Coordinates: 48°23′57″N 18°24′14″E
- Owner: ViOn Zlaté Moravce
- Operator: ViOn Zlaté Moravce
- Capacity: 4,008
- Surface: Natural Grass
- Field size: 105 x 68 m

Construction
- Built: 1998
- Renovated: 2007, 2014
- Cost: 1.4 million € in 2014

Tenants
- ViOn Zlaté Moravce (1998–present); Slovakia U21 (occasional); ŠKF Sereď (2020–2021); KFC Komárno (2024–2026)

Website
- www.fcvion.sk

Štadión FC ViOn is a football stadium in the city of Zlaté Moravce in Slovakia. It is the home ground of FC ViOn Zlaté Moravce and has a capacity of 4,008. The intensity of the floodlighting is 1,400 lux.

== History ==
The stadium was built in 1998 and used for football matches of FC ViOn Zlaté Moravce sport club. The original capacity was 3,300 spectators. Due to renovation work in 2014 the capacity was increased.

The Slovak national team also played one match at the stadium, losing a 1-2 friendly to Iceland on 26 March 2008. In 2016, the stadium was also one of the venues for the UEFA Women's Under-19 Championship. Three group stage matches were played there.

== Photo gallery ==
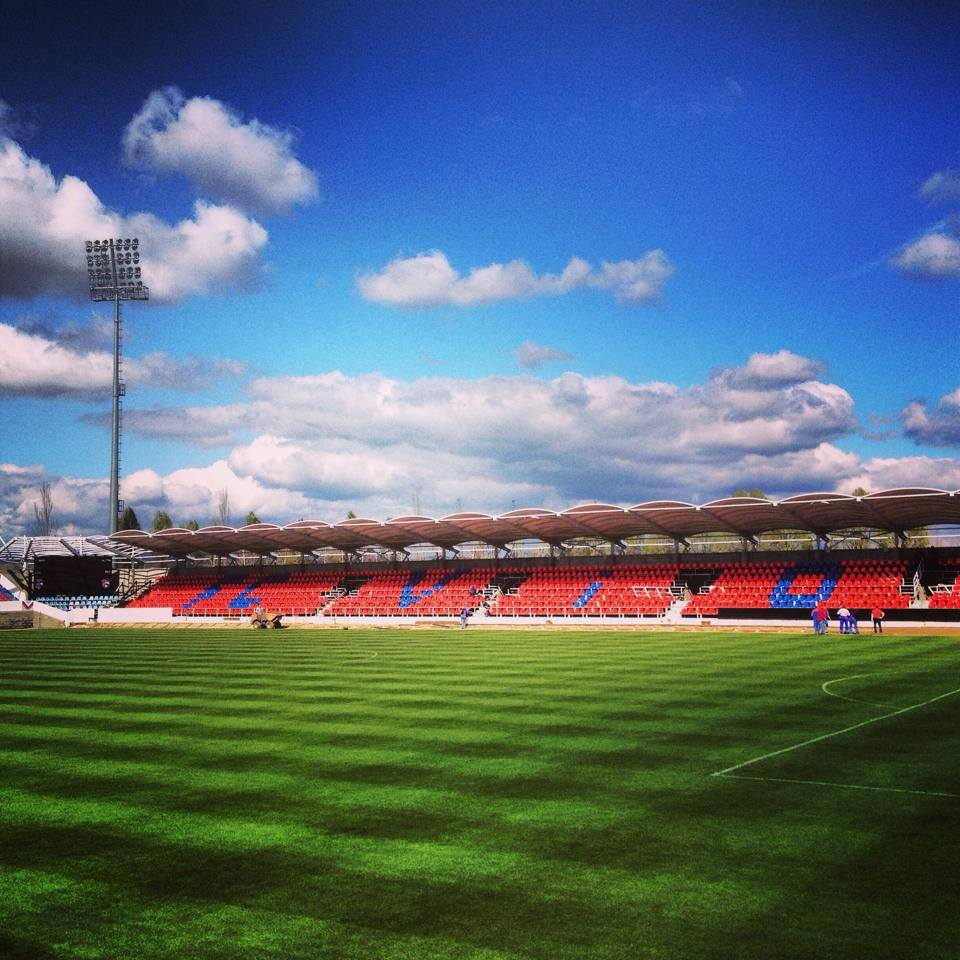
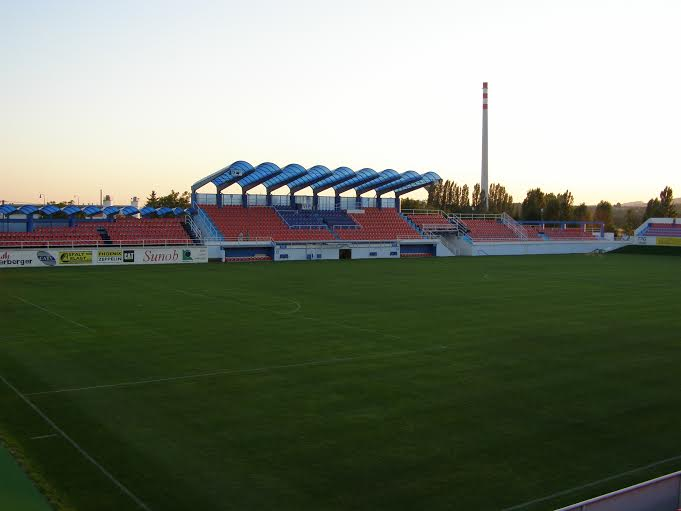

== International matches ==
FC ViOn stadium has hosted one friendly match of the Slovakia national football team.

26 March 2008 International Friendly	Slovakia	1–2	Iceland	Zlaté Moravce, Slovakia
20:15; Match 154	Marek Mintál 87'	Report	Gunnar Þorvaldsson 71'; Eiður Guðjohnsen 82'	Stadium: Štadión FC ViOn; Attendance: 4,120; Referee: Gerald Lehner (Austria)
