= Alieu Fadera =

Gambian footballer (born 2001)

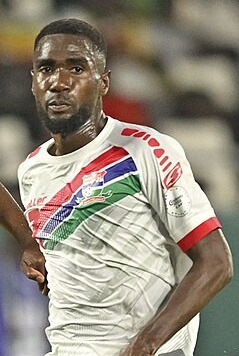
- Fadera with Gambia in 2024

Personal information
- Date of birth: 3 November 2001 (age 25)
- Place of birth: Fajara, Bakau, Gambia
- Height: 1.82 m (6 ft 0 in)
- Position: Winger

Team information
- Current team: Cagliari (on loan from Como)
- Number: 39

Youth career
- 2016–2020: Real de Banjul

Senior career*
Years	Team	Apps	(Gls)
2018–2020	Real de Banjul		
2020–2021	FK Pohronie	34	(6)
2021–2023	Zulte Waregem	51	(6)
2023–2024	KRC Genk	28	(3)
2024–	Como	28	(1)
2025–2026	→ Sassuolo (loan)	28	(2)
2026–	→ Cagliari (loan)	0	(0)

International career^{‡}
- Gambia U20
2022–	Gambia	16	(1)
- * Club domestic league appearances and goals as of 25 May 2026 ‡ National team caps and goals as of 23:30, 9 September 2025 (UTC)

Alieu Fadera (born 3 November 2001) is a Gambian professional footballer who plays as a winger for Serie A club Cagliari, on loan from Como, and the Gambia national team.

== Club career ==
=== FK Pohronie ===
Fadera's arrival at Slovak Fortuna Liga club FK Pohronie was announced on the club's website on 6 March 2020. His debut was delayed due to the league's postponement, caused by the coronavirus pandemic.

He became Pohronie's top scorer in the 2020–21 season, tied with James Weir with 5 goals each.

=== Zulte Waregem and KRC Genk ===
On 3 August 2021, it was announced that Fadera had signed a four-year contract with Belgian club Zulte Waregem. He was praised for his athleticism and physicality, as well as versatility in the offence.

Fadera and Zulte were relegated at the end of the 2022–23 season, with league runners-up KRC Genk signing him later in the summer.

=== Como ===
On 14 August 2024, Fadera signed a four-year contract with Italian Serie A club Como.

==== Loan to Sassuolo ====
On 28 July 2025, he was loaned to Sassuolo, with an option to buy.

== International career ==
In March 2021, Fadera received a nomination to the Gambian national team for two African Cup of Nations qualifiers against Angola and DR Congo. In line with FIFA regulations, Pohronie decided not to release Fadera for international fixtures due to concerns over COVID-19 pandemic and subsequent quarantine requirements those would rule Fadera out of important relegation group fixtures.

Fadera was selected to represent Gambia at the 2023 Africa Cup of Nations. He appeared in the opening 3–0 defeat versus Senegal, coming on as a substitute for Ibou Touray in the second half.

== Career statistics ==
=== Club ===
As of match played 25 January 2026

Appearances and goals by club, season and competition
Club	Season	League			Cup		Continental		Other		Total	
Club	Season	Division	Apps	Goals	Apps	Goals	Apps	Goals	Apps	Goals	Apps	Goals
Pohronie	2019–20	Slovak First Football League	3	1	0	0	—		—		3	1
Pohronie	2020–21	Slovak First Football League	31	5	1	1	—		—		32	6
Pohronie	2021–22	Slovak First Football League	0	0	0	0	—		—		0	0
Pohronie	Total		34	6	1	1	—		—		32	7
Zulte Waregem	2021–22	Belgian Pro League	18	0	2	0	—		—		20	0
Zulte Waregem	2022–23	Belgian Pro League	33	6	5	2	—		—		38	8
Zulte Waregem	Total		51	6	7	2	—		—		58	8
Genk	2023–24	Belgian Pro League	26	3	0	0	9 (Note: Two appearances in UEFA Champions League, one appearance in UEFA Europa League, six appearances in UEFA Conference League)	0	0	0	35	3
Genk	2024–25	Belgian Pro League	2	0	0	0	0	0	0	0	2	0
Genk	Total		28	3	0	0	9	0	0	0	37	3
Como	2024–25	Serie A	28	1	0	0	—		—		28	1
Sassuolo	2025–26	Serie A	21	2	2	0	—		—		23	2
Career total			162	18	10	3	9	0	0	0	181	21

=== International ===
As of match played 9 September 2025

National team	Year	Apps	Goals
Gambia	2022	1	0
Gambia	2023	3	0
Gambia	2024	9	0
Gambia	2025	3	1
Total		16	1

Scores and results list Gambia's goal tally first.

No.	Date	Venue	Opponent	Score	Result	Competition
1.	9 September 2025	Nyayo National Stadium, Nairobi, Kenya	Burundi	1–0	2–0	2026 FIFA World Cup qualification

== Personal life ==
Per his social media communication, Fadera adheres to Islam. Born in Fajara, The Gambia.

== Honours ==
Gambia U20

- WAFU U20 Championship: 2019
