= Mestský štadión Žiar nad Hronom =

Sports venue in Žiar nad Hronom, Slovakia

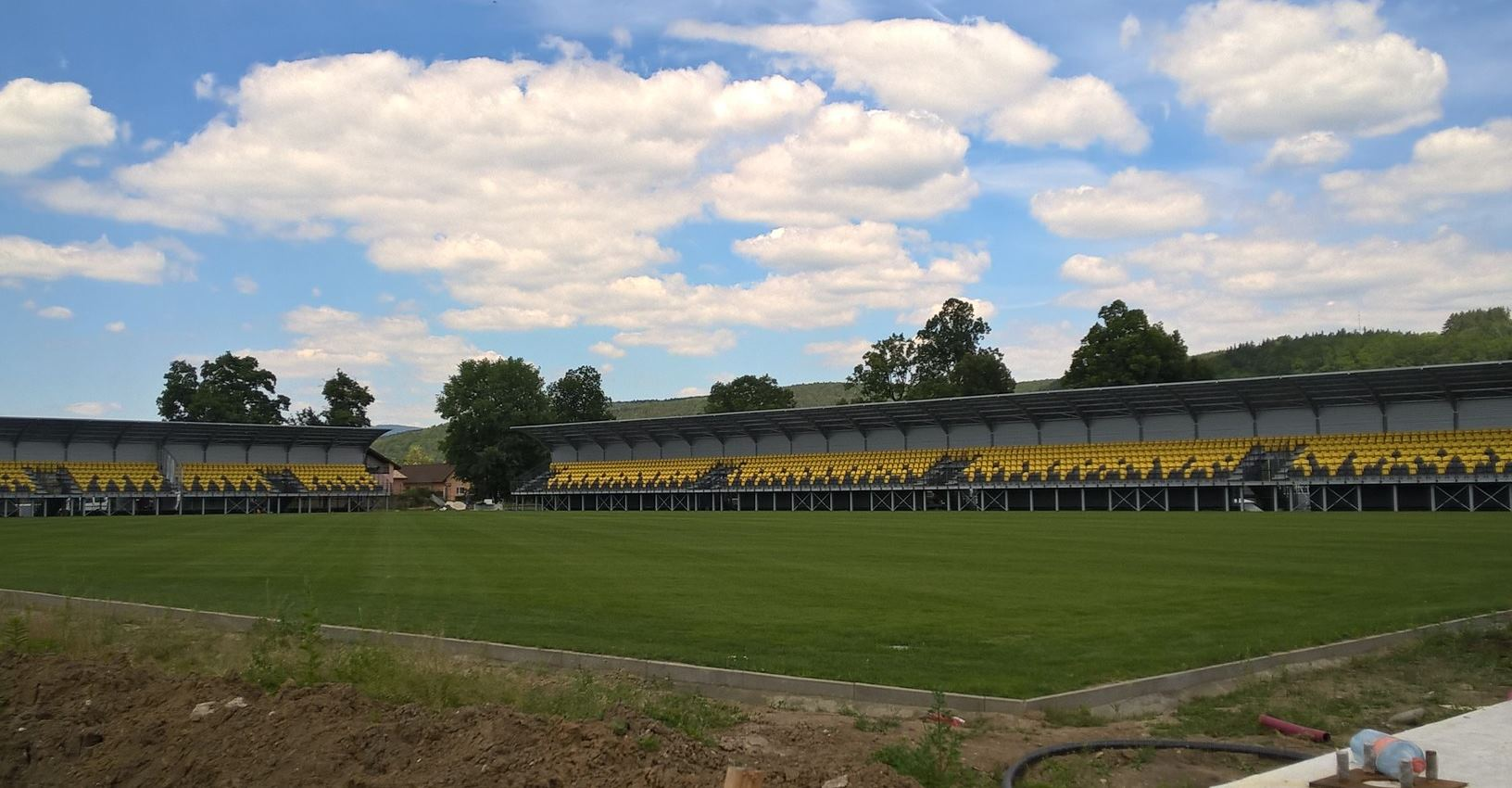
- UEFA
- Interactive map of Mestský štadión Žiar nad Hronom
- Address: Partizánska 10
- Location: Žiar nad Hronom, Slovakia
- Coordinates: 48°35.24′N 18°51.80′E
- Owner: City of Žiar nad Hronom
- Operator: FK Pohronie
- Capacity: 2,309
- Surface: Grass
- Record attendance: 10,048 (Slovak Cup Final, 8 May 1999)
- Field size: 110 x 65 m

Construction
- Opened: 1957
- Renovated: 2015–2017
- Cost: Renovation 2015–2017 €2 million

Tenants
- FK Žiar nad Hronom (1957–2012); FK Pohronie (2017–present)

Mestský štadión Žiar nad Hronom is a multi-use stadium in Žiar nad Hronom, Slovakia. It is currently used mostly for football matches and is the home ground of Fortuna liga team FK Pohronie. The stadium holds 2,309 people. In 1989 and 1999 it has hosted the final match of Slovak Cup.

== History and events ==
The stadium was officially opened in 1957. On 8 May 1999, it hosted the final match of the Slovak Cup between Slovan Bratislava and Dukla Banská Bystrica, setting the stadium's record attendance of 10,048 spectators.

== Reconstruction ==
In 2016 began reconstruction of the stadium. Original capacity 12.910 was decreased to 2,309 spectators (all-seated). The estimated cost is €2 million. Slovak government provided €750,000 of the cost. City of Žiar nad Hronom provided €1,000,000 and other private sponsors like Nemak €250,000
