= FK Pohronie =

Slovak association football club based in Žiar nad Hronom

- Full name: Futbalový klub Pohronie Žiar nad Hronom Dolná Ždaňa
- Founded: 2012; 14 years ago
- Ground: Mestský štadión, Žiar nad Hronom
- Capacity: 2,309
- Owner(s): City of Žiar nad Hronom 50% Municipality of Dolná Ždaňa 50%
- Chairman: Igor Rozenberg
- Manager: Róbert Jež (Interim)
- League: 2. liga
- 2025–26: 2. liga, 6th of 16
- Website: http://fkpohronie.sk/
Home colours	Away colours

FK Pohronie is a Slovak football team, based in the town of Žiar nad Hronom. The club currently competes in 2. Liga. The 2019/20 season was the first time in the club's history that the team played in Fortuna Liga, the highest level of the Slovak football league system. The club avoided relegation that season, and continued in the top division for the 2020/21 season. In the 2021/22 season the team was relegated.

== History ==
=== Founding ===
On 1 June 2012, Sokol Dolná Ždaňa and FK Žiar nad Hronom reached an agreement regarding the running of the new club. The newly created club would start in the 3. Liga.

=== Promotion ===
After six years in the 2nd league, the club finished first in the 2018/19 season and advanced to the top flight for the first time in their history. FK Pohranie made its debut in the Slovak First Football League in a 3–1 loss against ŠK Slovan Bratislava. Pohronie finished their first season in second to last place, having to play a relegation play-off match, which they won 1–0 against FK Senica. After three seasons in the top flight, Pohronie were relegated in the 2021/22 season, finishing in the last place with only 18 points.

=== Recent years ===
In October 2025, a subsidy of 30,000 euros was given to FK Pohronie from the municipality of Žiar nad Hronom after the club lost its sponsor following their financial troubles.

== Stadium ==
Until the end of 2017, the A team played its home matches on the field in Dolná Ždana. In the summer of 2017, Pohronie moved to the newly renovated football venue in Žiar nad Hronom which had a capacity of 2200 seats with artificial lighting.

== Affiliated clubs ==
The following clubs were or are affiliated with FK Pohronie :

- (Slovakia) MFK Žarnovica (2018–2019)
- (Slovakia) MFK Nová Baňa (2019–2022)
- (Slovakia) FK Železiarne Podbrezová (2022-)

== Honours ==
=== Domestic ===
- 2. Liga (1993–present)
  - Winners (1): 2018–19 (Promoted)
- 3. Liga - Central (1993–present)
  - Winners (1): 2012–13 (Promoted)

== Sponsorship ==
Period	Kit manufacturer	Shirt sponsor
2012–13	Jako	REMESLO
2012–13	Joma	none
2014–17	Adidas	none
2017–	Erreà	REMESLO

== Recent seasons ==
Year	Division (name)	Position	Domestic cup	Topscorer/goals
2012–13	(III) 3. liga	1/(16)	2nd round	(Slovakia) Michal Páleník (12)
2013–14	(II) 2. liga	9/(12)	2nd round	(Slovakia) Michal Páleník (10)
2014–15	(II) DOXXbet liga	1st Relegation Gr. West	3rd round	(Slovakia) Patrik Abrahám (15)
2015–16	(II) DOXXbet liga	6th	Round of 16	(Slovakia) Patrik Abrahám (8)
2016–17	(II) DOXXbet liga	9th	3rd Round	(Slovakia) Marek Frimmel (15)
2017–18	(II) DOXXbet liga	9/(16)	3rd round	(Slovakia) Marek Frimmel (6)
2018–19	(II) 2. liga	1/(16)	5th Round	(Slovakia) Peter Ďungel (8)
2019–20	(I) Fortuna Liga	11/(12)	Round of 16	(Slovakia) Patrik Abrahám (5)
2020–21	(I) Fortuna Liga	9/(12)	Round of 16	(Switzerland) Adler Da Silva (6) (England) James Weir (6)
2021–22	(I) Fortuna Liga	12/(12)	Quarter-finals	(Slovakia) Miloš Lačný (8)
2022–23	(II) 2. Liga	5/(16)	5th Round	(Slovakia) Jakub Čunta (5) (Slovakia) Christián Steinhübel (5)
2023–24	(II) MONACObet liga	10/(16)	Round of 16	(Slovakia) Peter Mazan (15)
2024–25	(II) MONACObet liga	12/(14)	3rd round	(The Gambia) Ousman Kujabi (7)
2025–26	(II) MONACObet liga	6/(16)	3rd round	(Slovakia) Tobiáš Diviš (11)

== Current squad ==
As of 6 August 2026

Note: Flags indicate national team as defined under FIFA eligibility rules; some limited exceptions apply. Players may hold more than one non-FIFA nationality.

No.	Pos.	Nation	Player
6	MF	EST	Aleksandr Lohmatov
8	MF	GAM	Mohammed Sallah
9	DF	SVK	Pavol Kutka
10	MF	SVK	Jozef Špyrka
11	DF	GAM	Sanna Jobe
13	FW	SVK	Boris Rusnak
15	DF	CZE	Jakub Port
18	FW	SVK	Alin Lerint (on loan from Podbrezová)
20	GK	SVK	Igor Šemrinec
21	MF	SVK	Simon Ivan
22	MF	SVK	Fares Shudeiwa

No.	Pos.	Nation	Player
—	GK	SVK	Peter Sukovský
—	MF	SVK	Patrik Hrnčiar
—	DF	GAM	Bernard Mendy
—	MF	GAM	Muhammed Dumbuya
—	DF	GAM	Mohammad Sarr
—	DF	SVK	Mário Mrva
—	FW	SVK	Marek Kuzma
—	DF	SVK	Alex Lajčiak
—	MF	SVK	Samuel Šubert
—	MF	SVK	Adrián Petic
—	FW	SVK	Adrian Lutka
—	GK	CZE	Pedro Rodriguez (on loan from Sparta Prague)

For recent transfers, see List of Slovak football transfers summer 2026.

== Current staff ==
As of 8 March 2023

Staff	Job title
(Slovakia) Róbert Jež	Manager (carateker)
(Canada) Milovan Kapor	Assistant manager
(Slovakia) Róbert Jež	General manager
(Slovakia) Filip Rozenberg	Team leader
(Slovakia) Michal Polačko	Fitness trainer
(Slovakia) MUDr. Stanislav Šperka	Team Doctor
(Slovakia) Imrich Kalmár	Physiotherapist

== Player records ==
=== Most goals ===
#	Nat.	Name	Goals
1	(Slovakia)	Patrik Abrahám	39
2	(Slovakia)	Marek Frimmel	28
3	(Slovakia)	Peter Mazan	24
4	(Slovakia)	Patrik Blahút	21
4	(Slovakia)	Michal Páleník	21
5	(Slovakia)	Lukáš Pelegríni	17
6	(Slovakia)	Peter Ďungel	14
6	(Slovakia)	**Jozef Špyrka**	14

Players whose name is listed in bold are still active.

=== Reserve team ===
FK Pohronie B is inactive. Most recently, it had played in the Slovak 7th football level (VII. liga DOUBLE STAR BET ObFZ ZH).

== Notable players ==
The following notable players had international caps for their respective countries. Players whose name is listed in bold represented their countries while playing for FK Pohronie.
Notable players, who have played for predecessor clubs, FK Žiar nad Hronom and Sokol Dolná Ždaňa, are listed with their respective clubs.

- (Burkina Faso) Cedric Badolo
- (Burundi) **Bonfils-Caleb Bimenyimana**
- (Ivory Coast) Willie Britto
- (Slovakia) Martin Chrien
- (Slovakia) Martin Dobrotka
- (The Gambia) Alieu Fadera
- (Slovakia) Dominik Holec
- (Slovakia) David Hrnčár
- (Slovakia) Richard Lásik
- (Vietnam) Patrik Le Giang
- (Kenya) **Yusuf Mainge**
- (Slovakia) Jaroslav Mihalík
- (Slovakia) František Plach
- (The Gambia) **Muhammed Sanneh**
- (Georgia (country)) Davit Skhirtladze
- (Slovakia) Lukáš Tesák
- (Poland) Mateusz Zachara

== Managers ==
- (Slovakia) Štefan Zaťko (2012 – May 2016)
- (Slovakia) Rastislav Štanga (May 2016 – June 2016)
- (Slovakia) Peter Černák (July 2016 – Aug 2016)
- (Slovakia) Miloš Foltán (Aug 2016 – Sept 2017)
- (Slovakia) Milan Nemec (Sept 2017 – July 2019)
- (Slovakia) Rastislav Urgela (Aug 2019) (car.)
- (Slovakia) Ján Rosinský (Aug 2019 – Oct 2019)
- (Slovakia) Mikuláš Radványi (Oct 2019 – Oct. 2020)
- (Czech Republic) Jan Kameník (Oct 2020 – May 2021)
- (Slovakia) Gergely Geri (June 2021 – Aug 2021)
- (Slovakia) Štefan Zaťko (Aug 2021 – Sept 2021) (car.)
- (Spain) Pablo Villar (Oct 2021 – Dec 2021)
- (Czech Republic) Martin Bittengl (Jan 2022 – April 2022)
- (Slovakia) Peter Lérant (April 2022 – Dec 2022)
- (Czech Republic) Jan Kameník (Jan 2023)
- (Slovakia) Rastislav Urgela (Jan 2023 – Dec 2023) (car.)
- (Slovakia) Norbert Guľa (Jan 2024 – Jun 2024)
- (Slovakia) Vladimír Cifranič (Jun 2024)
- (Slovakia) Matej Čobik Ferčik (Jun 2024 – May 2025)
- (Slovakia) Erik Grendel (Jun 2025-May 2026)
- (Slovakia) Pavol Gregora (May 2026-Oct 2026)
- (Slovakia) Róbert Jež (Oct 2026-) (Interim)
