= 2017–18 FC Spartak Trnava season =

Slovak football club season

Spartak Trnava
2017–18 season
- Owner: Vladimír Poór
- President: Dušan Keketi
- Manager: Nestor El Maestro
- Stadium: Štadión Antona Malatinského
- Slovak First Football League: 1st
- Slovak Cup: Semi-finals
- Top goalscorer: League: Marvin Egho (7); All: Marvin Egho (15)
- Highest home attendance: 17,113 v Trenčín (19 May 2018, Slovak First Football League)
- Lowest home attendance: 2,070 v Spišská Nová Ves (18 October 2017, Slovak Cup)
- Average home league attendance: 6,734
- Biggest win: 10–0 v Družstevník Jacovce (Away, 9 August 2017, Slovak Cup)
- Biggest defeat: 0–6 v Žilina (Away, 12 May 2018, Slovak First Football League)
Home colours	Away colours

The 2017–18 season was Football Club Spartak Trnava's 16th consecutive season in the Slovak First Football League. In addition to the domestic league, Spartak Trnava participated in this season's edition of the Slovak Cup.

== Squad ==
Squad at end of season

Note: Flags indicate national team as defined under FIFA eligibility rules; some limited exceptions apply. Players may hold more than one non-FIFA nationality.

No.	Pos.	Nation	Player
1	GK	SVK	Martin Chudý
2	DF	SVK	Andrej Kadlec
3	DF	SVK	Oliver Janso
6	MF	UKR	Illya Cherednychenko
7	MF	GEO	Vakhtang Chanturishvili
8	MF	GER	Reagy Ofosu
10	MF	AUT	Yasin Pehlivan
11	FW	AUT	Kubilay Yilmaz
12	FW	MKD	Stefan Bogdanovski
15	DF	SVK	Ivan Hladík
16	MF	SVK	Ján Vlasko
17	DF	BIH	Eldar Ćivić (on loan from Sparta Prague)
18	MF	SVK	Anton Sloboda

No.	Pos.	Nation	Player
19	MF	SVK	Tomáš Brigant
20	DF	SVK	Matúš Čonka
21	DF	SVK	Boris Godál (vice-captain)
22	DF	SVK	Martin Tóth
24	DF	SVK	Matej Oravec
27	FW	SVK	Andrej Lovás
33	MF	SVK	Erik Jirka
34	MF	SVK	Lukáš Greššák (captain)
39	MF	SVK	Štefan Pekár
40	GK	SVK	Peter Urminský
45	FW	AUT	Marvin Egho
71	GK	SVK	Dominik Takáč
72	GK	SVK	Martin Vantruba (on loan from Slavia Prague)

== Transfers ==
=== Summer ===
In: Note: Flags indicate national team as defined under FIFA eligibility rules; some limited exceptions apply. Players may hold more than one non-FIFA nationality.

No.	Pos.	Nation	Player
—	FW	SVK	Andrej Lovás (from MFK Ružomberok)
—	MF	GEO	Vakhtang Chanturishvili (from (Ukraine) FC Oleksandriya)
—	MF	AUT	Yasin Pehlivan (free agent)
—	FW	AUT	Marvin Egho (from (Austria) SV Ried)
—	DF	SRB	Slavko Lukić (free agent)
—	MF	SVK	Štefan Pekár (from (Czech Republic) FC Baník Ostrava)
—	MF	SVK	Tomáš Brigant (from (Czech Republic) FC Zbrojovka Brno)
—	GK	SVK	Martin Chudý (from (Czech Republic) FK Teplice)
—	MF	SVK	Ján Vlasko (free agent)

Out: Note: Flags indicate national team as defined under FIFA eligibility rules; some limited exceptions apply. Players may hold more than one non-FIFA nationality.

No.	Pos.	Nation	Player
—	GK	SVK	Matej Strapák (End of contract)
—	DF	SVK	Peter Čögley (End of contract - joined AS Trenčín)
—	MF	BRA	Kerlon (Released)
—	MF	BIH	Emir Halilović (End of contract - joined (Austria) FC Blau-Weiß Linz)
—	MF	SVK	Martin Košťál (End of contract - joined (Poland) Wisła Kraków)
—	FW	SVK	Ivan Schranz (End of contract - joined (Czech Republic) Dukla Prague)
—	FW	SVK	Daniel Dubec (End of contract - joined Poprad)
—	GK	SVK	Adam Jakubech (to (France) Lille OSC)
—	FW	CMR	Robert Tambe (to (Turkey) Adana Demirspor)

=== Winter ===
In: Note: Flags indicate national team as defined under FIFA eligibility rules; some limited exceptions apply. Players may hold more than one non-FIFA nationality.

No.	Pos.	Nation	Player
—	FW	SVK	Andrej Lovás (from MFK Ružomberok)
—	MF	GEO	Vakhtang Chanturishvili (from (Ukraine) FC Oleksandriya)
—	MF	AUT	Yasin Pehlivan (free agent)
—	FW	AUT	Marvin Egho (from (Austria) SV Ried)
—	DF	SRB	Slavko Lukić (free agent)
—	MF	SVK	Štefan Pekár (from (Czech Republic) FC Baník Ostrava)
—	MF	SVK	Tomáš Brigant (from (Czech Republic) FC Zbrojovka Brno)
—	GK	SVK	Martin Chudý (from (Czech Republic) FK Teplice)
—	MF	SVK	Ján Vlasko (free agent)

Out: Note: Flags indicate national team as defined under FIFA eligibility rules; some limited exceptions apply. Players may hold more than one non-FIFA nationality.

No.	Pos.	Nation	Player
—	GK	SVK	Matej Strapák (End of contract)
—	DF	SVK	Peter Čögley (End of contract - joined AS Trenčín)
—	MF	BRA	Kerlon (Released)
—	MF	BIH	Emir Halilović (End of contract - joined (Austria) FC Blau-Weiß Linz)
—	MF	SVK	Martin Košťál (End of contract - joined (Poland) Wisła Kraków)
—	FW	SVK	Ivan Schranz (End of contract - joined (Czech Republic) Dukla Prague)
—	FW	SVK	Daniel Dubec (End of contract - joined Poprad)
—	GK	SVK	Adam Jakubech (to (France) Lille OSC)
—	FW	CMR	Robert Tambe (to (Turkey) Adana Demirspor)

== Competitions ==
=== Overview ===
Competition	First match	Last match	Starting round	Final position	Record							
Competition	First match	Last match	Starting round	Final position	Pld	W	D	L	GF	GA	GD	Win %
Slovak First Football League	22 July 2017	19 May 2018	Matchday 1	1st	32	20	4	8	41	28	+13	62.50
Slovak Cup	9 August 2017	18 April 2018	Second round	Semi-finals	7	5	2	0	26	3	+23	71.43
Total					39	25	6	8	67	31	+36	64.10

Source: Competitions

=== Slovak First Football League ===
==== Regular season ====
===== League table =====
Pos	Team	Pld	W	D	L	GF	GA	GD	Pts	Qualification
1	Spartak Trnava	22	16	2	4	34	16	+18	50	Qualification for the championship group
2	Slovan Bratislava	22	11	8	3	45	26	+19	41	Qualification for the championship group
3	DAC Dunajská Streda	22	10	9	3	29	20	+9	39	Qualification for the championship group
4	Žilina	22	12	1	9	42	35	+7	37	Qualification for the championship group
5	Trenčín	22	10	6	6	54	32	+22	36	Qualification for the championship group

Source: Niké liga (in Slovak)
Rules for classification: 1) Points; 2) Head-to-head points; 3) Head-to-head goal difference; 4) Head-to-head away goals scored; 5) Play-off.

===== Results summary =====
Overall								Home						Away					
Pld	W	D	L	GF	GA	GD	Pts	W	D	L	GF	GA	GD	W	D	L	GF	GA	GD
22	16	2	4	34	16	+18	50	8	1	2	14	8	+6	8	1	2	20	8	+12

Source: Worldfootball

===== Results by round =====
Round	1	2	3	4	5	6	7	8	9	10	11	12	13	14	15	16	17	18	19	20	21	22
Ground	H	A	H	A	H	A	H	A	H	A	H	A	H	A	H	A	H	A	H	A	H	A
Result	W	W	W	W	L	L	W	W	W	W	W	W	W	W	D	L	L	W	W	W	W	D
Position	6	3	1	1	2	3	3	3	2	1	1	1	1	1	1	1	1	1	1	1	1	1
Points	3	6	9	12	12	12	15	18	21	24	27	30	33	36	37	37	37	40	43	46	49	50

Source: Worldfootball
A = Away; H = Home; W = Win; D = Draw; L = Loss

===== Matches =====
22 July 2017 1	Spartak Trnava	1–0	Zemplín Michalovce	Trnava
19:00 CEST (UTC+2)	Pekár 6'; Godál (yellow card) 42'	Report	Bragin (yellow card) 8'; Božok (yellow card) 33'; Koscelník (yellow card) 39'; Turík (yellow card) 86'	Stadium: Štadión Antona Malatinského; Attendance: 2,134; Referee: Boris Marhefka; Assistant referees: Roman Slyško, Rastislav Žákech

28 July 2017 2	Podbrezová	1–2	Spartak Trnava	Podbrezová
18:30 CEST (UTC+2)	Turňa (yellow card) 52'; Krivák (yellow card) 58'; Rendla 90'; Kuzma (yellow card) 90'	Report	Pekár (yellow card) 19'; Egho 37', 42'; Tóth (yellow card) 59'; Lukić (yellow card) 90'	Stadium: ZELPO Aréna; Attendance: 1,423; Referee: Patrik Hrčka; Assistant referees: Miroslav Benko, Marek Galo

5 August 2017 3	Spartak Trnava	2–1	Trenčín	Trnava
18:30 CEST (UTC+2)	Godál 31' (pen.), 54'; Chanturishvili (yellow card) 55'; Tóth (yellow card) 90'	Report	El Mahdioui 23'; Klooster (yellow card) 46' (yellow-red card) 87'; Šulek (yellow card) 61' (yellow-red card) 84'; Ubbink (yellow card) 69'	Stadium: Štadión Antona Malatinského; Attendance: 3,890; Referee: Ivan Kružliak; Assistant referees: Tomáš Mókoš, Juraj Lieskovský

12 August 2017 4	Ružomberok	0–2	Spartak Trnava	Ružomberok
19:00 CEST (UTC+2)		Report	Tóth 9'; Kružliak 20' (o.g.)	Stadium: Štadión pod Čebraťom; Attendance: 2,747; Referee: Jozef Pavlík; Assistant referees: Gabriel Ádám, Ján Pozor

19 August 2017 5	Spartak Trnava	1–2	Slovan Bratislava	Trnava
18:36 CEST (UTC+2)	Godál (yellow card) 61'; Yilmaz 77'; Pehlivan (yellow card) 90'	Report	De Kamps (yellow card) 21'; Rabiu (yellow card) 21'; Hološko 27'; Čavrić 30'; Mareš (yellow card) 50'; Greif (yellow card) 90'; Savićević (yellow card) 90'	Stadium: Štadión Antona Malatinského; Attendance: 8,580; Referee: Dušan Sedlák; Assistant referees: Michal Tomčík, Peter Chládek

25 August 2017 6	Žilina	3–1	Spartak Trnava	Žilina
18:30 CEST (UTC+2)	Škvarka 13'; Otubanjo (yellow card) 55', (goal) 82'; Vavro (yellow card) 66'; Káčer (yellow card) 66'; Jánošík 90'	Report	Kadlec 17'; Lukić (yellow card) 19'; Pehlivan (yellow card) 89'; Egho (yellow card) 90'	Stadium: Štadión pod Dubňom; Attendance: 4,689; Referee: Patrik Hrčka; Assistant referees: Miroslav Benko, Dušan Hrčka

10 September 2017 7	Spartak Trnava	2–1	Nitra	Trnava
19:00 CEST (UTC+2)	Čonka (yellow card) 27'; Lukić (yellow card) 40'; Pehlivan (yellow card) 44'; Brigant 82'; Hladík 90'	Report	Šimončič (yellow card) 15'; Niba (yellow card) 18'; Chovanec (yellow card) 44' (yellow-red card) 90'; Kuník (yellow card) 72'; Ivančík 76'; Hroššo (yellow card) 90'	Stadium: Štadión Antona Malatinského; Attendance: 5,932; Referee: Ivan Kružliak; Assistant referees: Roman Slyško, Tomáš Mókoš

16 September 2017 8	Tatran Prešov	0–2	Spartak Trnava	Poprad (Note: Tatran Prešov played their home league matches at the NTC Poprad in Poprad due to the rebuilding of their own Tatran Stadium in Prešov.)
19:00 CEST (UTC+2)	Černák (yellow card) 30'	Report	Jirka 21', 86'	Stadium: NTC Poprad; Attendance: 1,079; Referee: Michal Smolák; Assistant referees: Michal Tomčík, Ján Pozor

20 September 2017 9	Spartak Trnava	1–0	ViOn Zlaté Moravce	Trnava
19:00 CEST (UTC+2)	Čonka (yellow card) 18'; Jirka 32'	Report	Oliveira (yellow card) 6'; Nikolić (yellow card) 21'; Záhumenský (yellow card) 86'	Stadium: Štadión Antona Malatinského; Attendance: 2,851; Referee: Michal Očenáš; Assistant referees: Martin Balko, Miroslav Benko

23 September 2017 10	Senica	1–3	Spartak Trnava	Senica
19:00 CEST (UTC+2)	Sarpei (yellow card) 29'; Ranko (yellow card) 35'; Krč (yellow card) 60'; Rômulo (yellow card) 65'; Medveděv 70', (yellow card) 76'	Report	Egho 15'; Jirka 37'; Hladík (yellow card) 65'; Godál 77' (pen.); Vantruba (yellow card) 84'	Stadium: OMS ARENA Senica; Attendance: 1,501; Referee: Mário Vlk; Assistant referees: Erik Weiss, Marek Galo

30 September 2017 11	Spartak Trnava	2–0	DAC Dunajská Streda	Trnava
17:15 CEST (UTC+2)	Vlasko (yellow card) 39'; Chanturishvili (yellow card) 42', (goal) 83'; Godál (yellow card) 51'; Egho (yellow card) 64', (goal) 84'; Lukić (yellow card) 67'	Report	Vida (yellow card) 25'; Ljubičić (yellow card) 29'; Pačinda (yellow card) 36'; Pambou (yellow card) 39'; Živković (yellow card) 45' (yellow-red card) 48'; Kalmár (yellow card) 80'	Stadium: Štadión Antona Malatinského; Attendance: 5,723; Referee: Ivan Kružliak; Assistant referees: Branislav Hancko, Tomáš Vorel

14 October 2017 12	Zemplín Michalovce	0–3	Spartak Trnava	Michalovce
15:00 CEST (UTC+2)	Danko (yellow card) 69'; Carrillo (yellow card) 83'	Report	Čonka 5'; Jirka 23'; Lukić (yellow card) 29'; Vlasko (yellow card) 45'; Kadlec 84'	Stadium: Mestský futbalový štadión Attendance: 1,813; Referee: Jozef Pavlík; Assistant referees: Miroslav Benko, Dušan Hrčka

21 October 2017 13	Spartak Trnava	2–0	Podbrezová	Trnava
17:00 CEST (UTC+2)	Tóth (yellow card) 14'; Vlasko 49'; Chanturishvili 78'	Report	Baéz (yellow card) 1'; Krivák (yellow card) 45'; Kuciak (yellow card) 77'	Stadium: Štadión Antona Malatinského; Attendance: 4,311; Referee: Peter Ziemba; Assistant referees: Peter Chládek, Rastislav Žákech

29 October 2017 14	Trenčín	1–2	Spartak Trnava	Trenčín
17:00 CET (UTC+1)	Beridze (yellow card) 17'; Skovajsa (yellow card) 25'; Kleščík (yellow card) 35'; Čögley 68'; Van Haaren (yellow card) 76'	Report	Pehlivan (yellow card) 38'; Jirka (yellow card) 40'; Egho 49'; Chanturishvili 58'	Stadium: Štadión na Sihoti; Attendance: 3,042; Referee: Boris Marhefka; Assistant referees: Roman Slyško, Ján Pozor

5 November 2017 15	Spartak Trnava	1–1	Ružomberok	Trnava
17:00 CET (UTC+1)	Vlasko 17'; Sloboda (yellow card) 37'	Report	Haskić 4'; Kostadinov (yellow card) 14'; Macík (yellow card) 89'	Stadium: Štadión Antona Malatinského; Attendance: 4,251; Referee: Filip Glova; Assistant referees: Tomáš Vorel, Andrej Hrmo

19 November 2017 16	Slovan Bratislava	1–0	Spartak Trnava	Bratislava
14:00 CET (UTC+1)	Hološko 14'; Savićević (yellow card) 39'; Mareš (yellow card) 66'	Report	Chanturishvili (yellow card) 18'; Pehlivan (yellow card) 52'; Sloboda (yellow card) 64'; Kadlec (yellow card) 90'	Stadium: Pasienky; Attendance: 3,856; Referee: Michal Očenáš; Assistant referees: Miroslav Benko, Erik Weiss

25 November 2017 17	Spartak Trnava	0–3	Žilina	Trnava
15:00 CET (UTC+1)	Sloboda (yellow card) 32'; Lovás (yellow card) 84'; Godál (yellow card) 86'	Report	Jánošík 12'; Mazáň (yellow card) 40'; Škvarka 62'; Mráz 75'; Lačný (yellow card) 83'	Stadium: Štadión Antona Malatinského; Attendance: 4,405; Referee: Boris Marhefka; Assistant referees: Miroslav Benko, Ján Pozor

5 December 2017 18	Nitra	0–1	Spartak Trnava	Trenčín (Note: The match was played at Štadión na Sihoti in Trenčín instead of Nitra regular stadium, Štadión pod Zoborom in Nitra.)
17:00 CET (UTC+1)	Ngeyitala (yellow card) 30'	Report	Sloboda 89'	Stadium: Štadión na Sihoti; Attendance: 106; Referee: Patrik Hrčka; Assistant referees: Michal Tomčík, Rastislav Žákech

9 December 2017 19	Spartak Trnava	1–0	Tatran Prešov	Trnava
14:00 CET (UTC+1)	Chanturishvili 2'; Greššák (yellow card) 29'; Vlasko (yellow card) 35'	Report	Dupkala (yellow card) 22'; Udeh (yellow card) 44'	Stadium: Štadión Antona Malatinského; Attendance: 2,321; Referee: Filip Glova; Assistant referees: Peter Kováč, Martin Borsányi

17 February 2018 20	ViOn Zlaté Moravce	1–4	Spartak Trnava	Zlaté Moravce
16:00 CET (UTC+1)	Šašinka 84' (pen.)	Report	Chanturishvili 12'; Pehlivan 16'; Egho 27'; Horník 62' (o.g.)	Stadium: Štadión FC ViOn; Attendance: 1,874; Referee: Jozef Pavlík; Assistant referees: Roman Slyško, Juraj Lieskovský

24 February 2018 21	Spartak Trnava	1–0	Senica	Trnava
14:00 CET (UTC+1)	Sloboda (yellow card) 80'; Ofosu 90'	Report	Cuadros (yellow card) 53'; Vaščák (yellow card) 55'; Chacón (yellow card) 58'; Zezinho (yellow card) 68'	Stadium: Štadión Antona Malatinského; Attendance: 3,312; Referee: Michal Smolák; Assistant referees: Tomáš Mókoš, Matej Barenčík

3 March 2018 22	DAC Dunajská Streda	0–0	Spartak Trnava	Dunajská Streda
14:00 CET (UTC+1)	Ljubičić (yellow card) 78'; Huk (yellow card) 90'; Čmelík (yellow card) 90'	Report	Pehlivan (yellow card) 51'; Sloboda (yellow card) 60'; Kadlec (yellow card) 87'; Egho (yellow card) 90'	Stadium: MOL Aréna; Attendance: 6,709; Referee: Patrik Hrčka; Assistant referees: Erik Weiss, Michal Tomčík

==== Championship group ====
===== League table =====
Pos	Team	Pld	W	D	L	GF	GA	GD	Pts	Qualification	TRN	SLO	DAC	ŽIL	TRE	RUŽ
1	Spartak Trnava (C)	32	20	4	8	41	28	+13	64	Qualification for Champions League first qualifying round	—	1–0	2–0	0–0	0–2	1–0
2	Slovan Bratislava	32	17	8	7	58	37	+21	59	Qualification for Europa League first qualifying round	2–1	—	2–0	3–2	1–3	1–0
3	DAC Dunajská Streda	32	16	9	7	46	32	+14	57	Qualification for Europa League first qualifying round	1–0	0–1	—	3–1	0–3	3–0
4	Žilina	32	17	2	13	63	51	+12	53	Qualification for Europa League play-offs (Note: As the winners of 2017–18 Slovak Cup (Slovan Bratislava) finished in the top three of the league, the last Europa League spot awarded through the league (first qualifying round) will be decided by play-offs among the teams finishing fourth to seventh.)	6–0	2–0	2–3	—	1–5	3–0
5	Trenčín (O)	32	15	6	11	75	47	+28	51	Qualification for Europa League play-offs	1–2	1–3	1–3	1–2	—	3–1
6	Ružomberok	32	10	10	12	36	39	−3	40	Qualification for Europa League play-offs	0–0	1–0	0–4	1–2	2–1	—

Source: Niké liga (in Slovak)
Legend: Blue = home team win; Yellow = draw; Red = away team win.
Rules for classification: 1) Points; 2) Head-to-head points; 3) Head-to-head goal difference; 4) Head-to-head away goals scored; 5) Play-off.
(C) Champions; (O) Play-off winners

===== Results summary =====
Overall								Home						Away					
Pld	W	D	L	GF	GA	GD	Pts	W	D	L	GF	GA	GD	W	D	L	GF	GA	GD
10	4	2	4	7	12	−5	14	3	1	1	4	2	+2	1	1	3	3	10	−7

Source: Worldfootball

===== Results by round =====
Round	23	24	25	26	27	28	29	30	31	32
Ground	A	H	A	H	H	A	A	H	A	H
Result	W	D	L	W	W	D	L	W	L	L
Position	1	1	1	1	1	1	1	1	1	1
Points	53	54	54	57	60	61	61	64	64	64

Source: Worldfootball
A = Away; H = Home; W = Win; D = Draw; L = Loss

===== Matches =====
10 March 2018 23	Trenčín	1–2	Spartak Trnava	Trenčín
15:00 CET (UTC+1)	Paur (yellow card) 39'; Čataković 81'	Report	Jirka 23'; Yilmaz 65'; Pehlivan (yellow card) 84'	Stadium: Štadión na Sihoti; Attendance: 2,026; Referee: Boris Marhefka; Assistant referees: Dušan Hrčka, Gabriel Ádám

17 March 2018 24	Spartak Trnava	0–0	Žilina	Trnava
15:00 CET (UTC+1)	Pehlivan (yellow card) 22'; Ćivić (yellow card) 83'; Vlasko (yellow card) 86'	Report	Díaz (yellow card) 20'; Vallo (yellow card) 25'; Pečovský (red card) 52'; Volešák (yellow card) 90'	Stadium: Štadión Antona Malatinského; Attendance: 5,190; Referee: Ivan Kružliak; Assistant referees: Ján Pozor, Peter Bednár

1 April 2018 25	DAC Dunajská Streda	1–0	Spartak Trnava	Dunajská Streda
15:20 CEST (UTC+2)	Čmelík (yellow card) 7'; Koštrna (yellow card) 44'; Herc (yellow card) 58'; Blackman (yellow card) 59'; Bayo 60'; Macej (yellow card) 90'; Kalmár (yellow card) 90'	Report	Ćivić (yellow card) 44'; Tóth (yellow card) 51'; Pehlivan (yellow card) 67'; Egho (yellow card) 90'	Stadium: MOL Aréna; Attendance: 7,236; Referee: Filip Glova; Assistant referees: Roman Slyško, Tomáš Mókoš

7 April 2018 26	Spartak Trnava	1–0	Slovan Bratislava	Trnava
15:30 CEST (UTC+2)	Ćivić (yellow card) 42'; Ofosu 56'; Godál (yellow card) 61'; Chanturishvili (yellow card) 90'; Egho (yellow card) 90'	Report	De Kamps (yellow card) 28'; Čavrić (red card) 32'; Holman (yellow card) 48'; Bozhikov (yellow card) 58'	Stadium: Štadión Antona Malatinského; Attendance: 13,123; Referee: Michal Očenáš; Assistant referees: Branislav Hancko, Dušan Hrčka

15 April 2018 27	Spartak Trnava	1–0	Ružomberok	Trnava
14:45 CEST (UTC+2)	Tóth 64'; Ofosu (yellow card) 80'	Report		Stadium: Štadión Antona Malatinského; Attendance: 7,772; Referee: Michal Smolák; Assistant referees: Peter Chládek, Peter Bednár

21 April 2018 28	Ružomberok	0–0	Spartak Trnava	Ružomberok
14:45 CEST (UTC+2)	Jonec (yellow card) 34'; Ľupták (yellow card) 42'	Report	Ćivić (yellow card) 33'; Godál (yellow card) 89'; Kadlec (yellow card) 90'	Stadium: Štadión pod Čebraťom; Attendance: 1,863; Referee: Jozef Pavlík; Assistant referees: Roman Slyško, Rastislav Žákech

28 April 2018 29	Slovan Bratislava	2–1	Spartak Trnava	Bratislava
20:30 CEST (UTC+2)	Rabiu (yellow card) 39'; Šporar 49'; Moha 68'; Rundić (yellow card) 69'; Saláta (yellow card) 85'; Šulla (yellow card) 90'	Report	Sloboda (yellow card) 11'; Pehlivan (yellow card) 21'; Godál 55' (pen.)	Stadium: Pasienky; Attendance: 6,352; Referee: Dušan Sedlák; Assistant referees: Peter Kováč, Marek Galo

5 May 2018 30	Spartak Trnava	2–0	DAC Dunajská Streda	Trnava
17:00 CEST (UTC+2)	Godál 5' (pen.); Chanturishvili (red card) 12'; Pehlivan (yellow card) 15'; Ćivić (yellow card) 40'; Tóth (yellow card) 68'; Egho 76'	Report	Huk (yellow card) 5' (yellow-red card) 8'; Kalmár (yellow card) 11' (yellow-red card) 12'; Bayo (yellow card) 15'; Herc (yellow card) 24'	Stadium: Štadión Antona Malatinského; Attendance: 16,832; Referee: Pavol Chmura; Assistant referees: Dušan Hrčka, Ján Pozor

12 May 2018 31	Žilina	6–0	Spartak Trnava	Žilina
17:45 CEST (UTC+2)	Kaša (yellow card) 9'; Káčer 13'; Mihalík 21'; Hancko 23'; Mráz 56'; Holúbek 59'; Kubík 86'	Report	Chanturishvili (yellow card) 50'	Stadium: Štadión pod Dubňom; Attendance: 3,387; Referee: Boris Marhefka; Assistant referees: Miroslav Benko, Rastislav Žákech

19 May 2018 32	Spartak Trnava	0–2	Trenčín	Trnava
17:00 CEST (UTC+2)	Greššák (yellow card) 65'; Pehlivan (yellow card) 66'; Egho (yellow card) 90'	Report	Sleegers 25'; Ubbink (yellow card) 65'; Lawrence (yellow card) 66'; Čataković 87'	Stadium: Štadión Antona Malatinského; Attendance: 17,113; Referee: Adam Somoláni; Assistant referees: Juraj Lieskovský, Tomáš Mókoš

=== Slovak Cup ===
9 August 2017 Second round	Družstevník Jacovce	0–10	Spartak Trnava
17:00 CEST (UTC+2)		Report	Chanturishvili 8'; Egho 32', 42', 43'; Brigant 66'; Yao 69', 70', 74'; Greššák 88', 89'	Attendance: 1,318; Referee: Martin Dohál; Assistant referees: Marek Galo, Michal Sluk

13 September 2017 Third round	Svätý Peter	1–8	Spartak Trnava	Svätý Peter
16:00 CEST (UTC+2)	Kianek 45'	Report	Lukić 12'; Vlasko 19'; Yilmaz 28', 34'; Cherednychenko 75', 88'; Bogdanovski 86'; Fiala 90' (o.g.)	Stadium: Ihrisko OŠK Svätý Peter; Attendance: 1,000; Referee: Richard Sedlár; Assistant referees: Branislav Hancko, Juraj Halíček

27 September 2017 Fourth round	Námestovo	0–1	Spartak Trnava	Námestovo
15:30 CEST (UTC+2)		Report	Lukić 20'	Stadium: Štadión MŠK Námestovo; Attendance: 1,450; Referee: Erik Gemzický; Assistant referees: Andrej Hrmo, Adam Jekkel

18 October 2017 Fifth round	Spartak Trnava	3–0	Spišská Nová Ves	Trnava
17:00 CEST (UTC+2)	Sloboda 12'; Egho 36'; Bogdanovski 81'	Report	Zekucia (yellow card) 44'; Vantroba (yellow card) 84'	Stadium: Štadión Antona Malatinského; Attendance: 2,070; Referee: Gabriel Michlian; Assistant referees: Peter Kováč, Matej Barenčík; Fourth official: Adam Somoláni

13 March 2018 Quarter-finals	Spartak Trnava	2–0	DAC Dunajská Streda	Trnava
17:00 CET (UTC+1)	Egho 79', 89'; Ofosu (yellow card) 83'	Report	Kalmár (yellow card) 23'; Huk (yellow card) 78'; Davis (yellow card) 83'; Ljubičić (red card) 90'	Stadium: Štadión Antona Malatinského; Attendance: 3,411; Referee: Kamil Horváth; Assistant referees: Miroslav Benko, Radoslav Bobko; Fourth official: Michal Smolák

4 April 2018 Semi-finals First leg	Slovan Bratislava	1–1	Spartak Trnava	Bratislava
18:30 CEST (UTC+2)	Čavrić 10'; Holman (yellow card) 21'; De Kamps (yellow card) 41'	Report	Pehlivan (yellow card) 17'; Egho 81'; Sloboda (yellow card) 88'	Stadium: Pasienky; Attendance: 2,141; Referee: Dušan Sedlák; Assistant referees: Peter Kováč, Peter Chládek; Fourth official: Tomáš Vorel

18 April 2018 Semi-finals Second leg	Spartak Trnava	1–1 (2–2 agg.) (3–4 p)	Slovan Bratislava	Trnava
17:00 CEST (UTC+2)	Sloboda (yellow card) 24'; Egho 43'	Report	Šporar 11'; Sekulić (yellow card) 18'; Bajrić (yellow card) 64'	Stadium: Štadión Antona Malatinského; Attendance: 6,180; Referee: Patrik Hrčka; Assistant referees: Erik Weiss, Dušan Hrčka; Fourth official: Peter Kováč
	Penalties
	Jirka (penalty scored); Pehlivan (penalty missed); Yilmaz (penalty missed); Chanturishvili (penalty scored); Godál (penalty scored)		(penalty missed) Moha; (penalty scored) Hološko; (penalty scored) Bozhikov; (penalty scored) Holman; (penalty scored) Savićević
