= 2017–18 Slovak Cup =

Tournament details
- Country: Slovakia
- Teams: 208

Final positions
- Champions: Slovan Bratislava
- Runners-up: Ružomberok

The 2017–18 Slovak Cup was the 49th edition of the competition. This tournament began on 22 July 2017. The winners of the cup, Slovan Bratislava, earned a place in the 2018–19 Europa League and would have joined the competition in the first qualifying round.

Slovan Bratislava were the defending champions having won the previous season's Cup by defeating MFK Skalica in the final by a score of 3–0.

== Format ==
The Cup this season was a knockout tournament contested between 208 clubs. Matches which were level after regulation advanced to penalties to determine a winner. Each round of the cup was contested over one leg with the exception of the semi-finals which were contested over two legs.

== First round ==
Team 1	Score	Team 2
MŠK Senec	6–1	Jakubov
Kostolné Kračany	1–1 (2–4 p)	Nový Život
Oponice	w/o	Topoľčany
FK Jablonové	1–3	Pezinok
Veľké Zálužie	0–3	Hrušovany
Veľké Kosihy	2–2 (6–7 p)	Svätý Peter
Družstevník Jacovce	2–1	Solčany
Lozorno	8–0	Veľké Leváre
Horné Saliby	0–1	Kolárovo
Strečno	0–8	Martin
Rajec	2–2 (2–5 p)	Jednota Bánová
Zemianske Kostol'any	1–1 (3–5 p)	Baník Prievidza
Čierne	1–7	Čadca
Slovan Rudinská	0–3	Tatran Krásno
Podolie	0–3	Spartak Myjava
Kmeťovo	1–5	Veľké Ludince
Nevidzany	3–1	Lokomotíva Kozarovce
Plevník-Drienové	w/o	Trenčianske Stankovce
Slovan Skalité	1–3	Kysucké Nové Mesto
Považská Bystrica	0–2	Častkovce
Rajecké Teplice	1–4	Stráňavy
Málinec	2–2 (4–6 p)	Poltár
Selce	1–3	Šalková
Bacúch	3–2	Sokol Medzibrod
Mikuláš-Palúdzka	w/o	Závažná Poruba
Bešeňová	1–3	Belá Dulice
Kováčová	3–3 (9–10 p)	Podlavice Badín
Spartak Vysoká nad Kysucou	1–1 (6–5 p)	Javorník Makov
Nižná	2–1	Tvrdošín
Liptovské Sliače	2–1	Liptovská Štiavnica
Strojár Krupina	1–2	Tatran VLM
Príbelce	2–2 (7–8 p)	Ďarmoty
Santrio Láza	2–4	Novohrad Lučenec
Oravská Poruba	2–1	Slovan Žabokreky
Ladomerská Vieska	2–0	Dynamo Diviaky
Oravan	0–1	Námestovo
Jasenov	1–1 (3–4 p)	Ptava NV Ptičie
Gemerská Hôrka	w/o	Rožňava
Veľká Ida	3–3 (7–8 p)	Kechnec
Družstevník Čirč	0–5	Odeva Lipany
Pavlovce nad Uhom	3–0	Nacina Ves
Slovan Poproč	3–2	Krásnohorské Podhradie
Olcnava	4–2	Hranovnica
Nový Život Kluknava	1–1 (4–5 p)	Pokrok Krompachy
Župčany	4–4 (6–8 p)	Šarišské Michaľany
Levoča	2–1	Spišské Podhradie
Veľká Lomnica	3–2	Slavoj Spišská Belá
Streda nad Bodrogom	1–3	Mladosť Kalša
Družstevník Parchovany	0–5	Vranov nad Topľou
Kamenica nad Cirochou	1–1 (5–3 p)	Humenné
Slovan Nálepkovo	2–7	Harichovce
Gerlachov	1–0	Svidník
Ivanka pri Dunaji	5–1	Čunovo
FC Pata	2–2 (6–4 p)	Galanta
Malacky	6–0	Závod
Družstevník Bešeňov	1–0	Šurany
Dvory nad Žitavou	0–6	Nové Zámky
Rusovce	2–0	Svätý Jur
Jaslovské Bohunice	4–4 (7–9 p)	Slovan Hlohovec
Lehnice	0–4	Vydrany
NMŠK 1922 Bratislava	0–4	Tomášov
Veľká Hradná	w/o	Slovan Trenčianske
Fatran Varín	1–4	Teplička nad Váhom
Predmier	1–3	MFK Bytča
Salka	2–5	Slovan Šahy
Partizán Cígeľ	3–5	Slovan Šimonovany
Višňové	2–3	Rosina
Sokol Zubrohlava	0–2	Oravské Veselé
Jesenské	0–1	Mesta Tornaľa
Iskra Hnúšťa	0–3	Tisovec
Slávia TU Košice	0–2	Spartak Medzev
Družstevník Perín	0–6	Vyšné Opátske
Košická Nová Ves	1–2	Čaňa
Tvarona Ulič	1–5	Snina
Olympia Borša	1–4	Geča
Soľ	6–0	Fintice
Veľké Kostolany	0–2	Malženice
Belá	1–3	Terchová
Prenaks Jablonec	1–13	Pezinok–Cajla
Šenkvice	2–1	Báhoň
Partizán Prečín	1–2	Partizán Domaniža
Kalinkovo	1–5	Slovan Most
Petržalka akadémia	8–0	Lamač Bratislava

== Second round ==
Sixty-four second round matches were played from 4 August 2017 to 16 August 2017.

Team 1	Score	Team 2
MŠK Senec	0–0 (2–4 p)	FC Pata
Slovan Hlohovec	2–2 (6–7 p)	Vydrany
Kolárovo	0–8	Dunajská Lužná
Kechnec	1–3	Partizán Bardejov
Kamenica nad Cirochou	0–2	Podbrezová
Nové Zámky	0–2	Slovan Bratislava
Družstevník Bešeňov	2–6	Malacky
Pezinok - Cajla	1–4	Hrušovany
Svätý Peter	4–1	Rusovce
Jednota Bánová	1–0	Martin
Púchov	5–0	Čadca
Nevidzany	0–6	Veľké Ludince
Kysucké Nové Mesto	0–4	Sereď
Slovan Šahy	1–2	Borčice
Častkovce	1–2	Šamorín
Stráňavy	0–1	Dubnica
Terchová	0–2	Tatran Prešov
Poltár	5–1	Šalková
Bacúch	2–7	Zemplín Michalovce
Závažná Poruba	4–3	Oravské Veselé
Belá Dulice	4–0	Podlavice Badín
Spartak Vysoká nad Kysucou	8–1	Nižná
Buzitka	1–7	Poprad
Hajnáčka	0–0 (6–5 p)	Liptovské Sliače
Tisovec	1–6	Liptovský Mikuláš
Tatran Chlebnice	0–5	Trenčín
Baník Štiavnicke Bane	6–2	Sása
Ďarmoty	0–3	Novohrad Lučenec
Oravská Poruba	2–0	Ladomerská Vieska
Námestovo	4–1	Nové Mesto nad Váhom
Ptava NV Ptičie	1–1 (1–3 p)	Spartak Medzev
Rožňava	0–4	Senica
Soľ	2–1	Vyšné Opátske
Čaňa	1–2	Odeva Lipany
Demjata	0–4	Slavoj Trebišov
Pavlovce nad Uhom	8–2	Slovan Poproč
Olcnava	0–5	Snina
Šarišské Michaľany	2–5	Lokomotíva Košice
Levoča	6–2	Geča
Veľká Lomnica	0–10	Ružomberok
Mladosť Kalša	3–0	Vranov nad Topľou
Gerlachov	1–1 (1–3 p)	Spišská Nová Ves
Lozorno	0–4	Pohronie
Slovan Trenčianske	0–0 (4–3 p)	Teplička nad Váhom
Tatran VLM	0–5	Liptovský Hrádok
Milénium	0–3	Pokrok Krompachy
Harichovce	5–3	Hornád Ždaňa
Družstevník Jacovce	0–10	Spartak Trnava
Baník Prievidza	1–1 (4–3 p)	Komárno
Spartak Myjava	3–1	Tatran Krásno
Plevník-Drienové	0–4	Malženice
Ivanka pri Dunaji	1–3	DAC Dunajská Streda
Partizán Domaniža	2–3	Inter Bratislava
Nový Život	2–2 (3–5 p)	Lokomotíva Zvolen
Rača	2–0	Pezinok
Tomášov	0–6	Petržalka akadémia
Lovča	1–5	Mesta Tornaľa
Rohožník	0–4	Skalica
Šenkvice	0–4	Lokomotíva DNV
Slovan Šimonovany	3–1	Rosina
MFK Bytča	1–8	Nitra
Beluša	2–4	ViOn Zlaté Moravce
Dobrá Niva	0–7	Žilina
Oponice	0–2	Slovan Most

== Third round ==
Thirty-two matches in the third round were played from 31 August 2017 to 14 September 2017.

Team 1	Score	Team 2
Slovan Šimonovany	1–1 (4–2 p)	ViOn Zlaté Moravce
Liptovský Hrádok	0–8	Trenčín
Malženice	1–1 (4–1 p)	Sereď
Baník Štiavnicke Bane	1–7	Novohrad Lučenec
Dubnica	3–1	Tatran Prešov
Soľ	1–1 (4–2 p)	Partizán Bardejov
Odeva Lipany	3–0	Slavoj Trebišov
Pokrok Krompachy	0–1	Lokomotíva Košice
Mladosť Kalša	0–3	Podbrezová
Harichovce	1–4	Spišská Nová Ves
Hajnáčka	1–5	Liptovský Mikuláš
Jednota Bánová	4–2	Baník Prievidza
Malacky	1–5	Slovan Bratislava
Hrušovany	0–0 (4–2 p)	Rača
Lokomotíva DNV	0–3	DAC Dunajská Streda
Svätý Peter	1–8	Spartak Trnava
Vydrany	1–0	Pohronie
Spartak Myjava	2–0	Púchov
Veľké Ludince	1–2	Inter Bratislava
Poltár	0–4	Zemplín Michalovce
Belá Dulice	4–1	Mesta Tornaľa
Spartak Medzev	1–1 (5–4 p)	Senica
Pavlovce nad Uhom	1–1 (4–5 p)	Snina
Levoča	1–9	Ružomberok
Oravská Poruba	1–1 (2–4 p)	Námestovo
Spartak Vysoká nad Kysucou	0–5	Poprad
Borčice	5–1	Šamorín
Slovan Trenčianske	0–7	Nitra
Závažná Poruba	0–11	Žilina
FC Pata	0–3	Lokomotíva Zvolen
Slovan Most	0–2	Skalica
Dunajská Lužná	1–2	Petržalka akadémia

== Fourth round ==
Sixteen matches in the fourth round were played from 27 September 2017 to 4 October 2017.

Team 1	Score	Team 2
Jednota Bánová	0–1	Lokomotíva Zvolen
Malženice	0–0 (2–4 p)	Skalica
Belá Dulice	0–7	Ružomberok
Odeva Lipany	1–2	Žilina
Spartak Medzev	1–0	Trenčín
Dubnica	1–2	Liptovský Mikuláš
Námestovo	0–1	Spartak Trnava
Borčice	3–1	Lokomotíva Košice
Hrušovany	1–3	DAC Dunajská Streda
Slovan Šimonovany	1–1 (7–8 p)	Inter Bratislava
Novohrad Lučenec	0–3	Nitra
Petržalka akadémia	0–3	Poprad
Vydrany	1–2	Spišská Nová Ves
Spartak Myjava	0–1	Slovan Bratislava
Snina	1–1 (2–4 p)	Zemplín Michalovce
Soľ	0–1	Podbrezová

== Fifth round ==
Eight fifth round matches were played 17–18 October 2017.

Team 1	Score	Team 2
Žilina	3–0	Podbrezová
Spartak Trnava	3–0	Spišská Nová Ves
Skalica	0–1	Ružomberok
Borčice	2–0	Zemplín Michalovce
Spartak Medzev	1–5	DAC Dunajská Streda
Poprad	1–0	Inter Bratislava
Slovan Bratislava	3–1	Nitra
Liptovský Mikuláš	2–0	Lokomotíva Zvolen

== Quarter-finals ==
Four quarter-final matches will be played 13–14 March 2018.

13 March 2018	Poprad	0–2	Ružomberok	Poprad
16:00		Report	Hric 32' (o.g.); Maslo 80'	Stadium: NTC Poprad; Attendance: 1,352; Referee: Filip Glova

13 March 2018	Spartak Trnava	2–0	DAC Dunajská Streda	Trnava
17:00	Egho 79', 88'	Report		Stadium: Anton Malatinský Stadium; Attendance: 3,411; Referee: Kamil Horvath

14 March 2018	Borčice	0–2	Žilina	Borčice
14:30		Report	Chvátal 26', 81'	Stadium: Stadium FK Iskra Borčice; Attendance: 580; Referee: Pavel Ochotnicky

14 March 2018	Slovan Bratislava	4–3	Liptovský Mikuláš	Bratislava
18:00	Savićević 55'; Vittek 68', 84'; Šporar 90+2'	Report	Andrić 35'; Očenáš 80'; Kotora 87'	Stadium: Štadión Pasienky; Attendance: 353; Referee: Peter Ziemba

== Semi-finals ==
For the semi-finals, the first legs were played on 3 and 4 April and the second on 18 April 2018. All times are CET (UTC+1).

=== First leg ===
3 April 2018	Ružomberok	2–1	Žilina	Ružomberok
17:00	Pikk 17'; Daniel 70'	Report	Králik 13'	Stadium: Štadión pod Čebraťom; Attendance: 1,735; Referee: Mário Vlk

4 April 2018	Slovan Bratislava	1–1	Spartak Trnava	Bratislava
18:30	Čavrić 10'	Report	Egho 81'	Stadium: Štadión Pasienky; Attendance: 2,141; Referee: Dušan Sedlák

=== Second leg ===
18 April 2018	Žilina	0–0 (1–2 agg.)	Ružomberok	Žilina
17:30		Report		Stadium: Štadión pod Dubňom; Attendance: 2,284; Referee: Kamil Horváth

18 April 2018	Spartak Trnava	1–1 (2–2 agg.) (3–4 p)	Slovan Bratislava	Trnava
17:00	Egho 43'	Report	Šporar 11'	Stadium: Štadión Antona Malatinského; Attendance: 6,180; Referee: Patrik Hrčka
	Penalties
	Jirka (penalty scored); Pehlivan (penalty missed); Yilmaz (penalty missed); Chanturishvili (penalty scored); Godál (penalty scored)		(penalty missed) Moha; (penalty scored) Hološko; (penalty scored) Bozhikov; (penalty scored) Holman; (penalty scored) Savićević

== Final ==
The final was played on 1 May 2018 at the Štadión Antona Malatinského in Trnava.

1 May 2018
17:25 (UTC+2)

Slovan Bratislava	3–1 (a.e.t.)	Ružomberok
Šporar 25'; Bozhikov 48'; Holman 60'	Report	Gál-Andrezly 58'

Anton Malatinský Stadium, Trnava
Attendance: 4,405
Referee: Patrik Hrčka

== See also ==
- 2017–18 Slovak First Football League
