= 2018 Slovak Cup final =

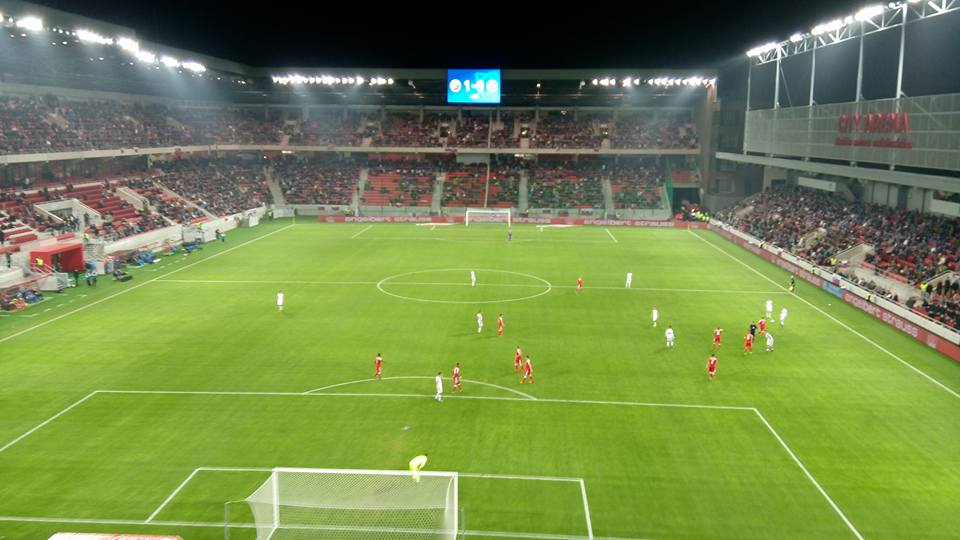
- Anton Malatinský Stadium in Trnava held the final
- Event: 2017–18 Slovak Cup
| Slovan Bratislava | Ružomberok |
| 3 | 1 |
- Date: 1 May 2018
- Venue: Anton Malatinský Stadium, Trnava
- Referee: Patrik Hrčka
- Attendance: 4,405

The 2018 Slovak Cup final (known as the Slovnaft Cup for sponsorship reasons) was the final match of the 2017–18 Slovak Cup, the 49th season of the top cup competition in Slovak football. The match was played at the Anton Malatinský Stadium in Trnava on 1 May 2018 between ŠK Slovan Bratislava and MFK Ružomberok.

== Road to the final ==
Note: In all results below, the score of the finalist is given first (H: home; A: away).

| Slovan Bratislava | | Round | Ružomberok |
|---|---|---|---|---|
| Opponent | Result | 2017–18 Slovak Cup | Opponent | Result |
| Nové Zámky | 2–0 (A) | Second Round | FK Veľká Lomnica | 10–0 (A) |
| Malacky | 5–1 (A) | Third Round | FK 05 Levoča | 9–1 (A) |
| Myjava | 1–0 (A) | Fourth Round | TJ Družstevník Belá – Dulice | 7–0 (A) |
| Nitra | 3–1 (H) | Round of 16 | Skalica | 1–0 (A) |
| Liptovský Mikuláš | 4–3 (H) | Quarter-finals | Poprad | 2–0 (A) |
| Spartak Trnava | 1–1 (H), 1–1 (a.e.t.) (A) (1–1 agg., 4–3 p) | Semi-finals | Žilina | 2–1 (H), 0–0 (A) (2–1 agg.) |

== Match ==
=== Details ===
1 May 2018
17:25 (UTC+2)

| Slovan Bratislava | 3–1 (a.e.t.) | Ružomberok |
|---|---|---|
| Šporar 25'; Bozhikov 48'; Holman 60' | Report | Gál-Andrezly 58' |

Anton Malatinský Stadium, Trnava
Attendance: 4,405
Referee: Patrik Hrčka

| Slovan Bratislava | MFK Ružomberok |

| GK | 30 | (Slovakia) Michal Šulla |
| RB | 14 | (Slovakia) Erik Čikoš |
| CB | 29 | (Bulgaria) Vasil Bozhikov |
| CB | 66 | (Slovenia) Kenan Bajrić | (yellow card) 25' |
| LB | 2 | (Slovakia) Boris Sekulić (c) |
| CM | 10 | (Nigeria) Rabiu Ibrahim |
| CM | 13 | (Spain) Nono |
| CM | 27 | (Hungary) David Holman | | (substituted off) 82' |
| RW | 45 | (Serbia) Aleksandar Čavrić | | (substituted off) 75' |
| FW | 9 | (Slovenia) Andraž Šporar | | (substituted off) 89' |
| LW | 20 | (Morocco) Moha |
Substitutes:
| GK | 68 | (Slovakia) Frederik Valach |
| CB | 3 | (Serbia) Milan Rundić |
| CB | 19 | (Slovakia) Kornel Saláta |
| CM | 4 | (Montenegro) Vukan Savićević |
| CM | 6 | (Netherlands) Joeri De Kamps | | (substituted in) 82' |
| FW | 21 | (Slovakia) Filip Hološko | | (substituted in) 75' |
| FW | 33 | (Slovakia) Robert Vittek | | (substituted in) 89' |
Manager:
(Slovakia) Martin Ševela

| GK | 33 | (Slovakia) Matúš Macík |
| RB | 17 | (Slovakia) Peter Maslo | (yellow card) 17' |
| CB | 3 | (Slovakia) Ján Maslo (c) |
| CB | 16 | (Slovakia) Michal Jonec |
| LB | 25 | (Estonia) Artur Pikk | (yellow card) 73' |
| CM | 6 | (Albania) Kristi Qose | (yellow card) 37' |
| CM | 26 | (Slovakia) Branislav Ľupták | | (substituted off) 82' |
| CM | 32 | (Slovakia) Róbert Gešnábel |
| RW | 23 | (Czech Republic) Erik Daniel | (yellow card) 36' |
| CF | 15 | (Slovakia) Štefan Gerec | | (substituted off) 89' |
| LW | 7 | (Slovakia) Peter Gál-Andrezly | | (substituted off) 75' |
Substitutes:
| GK | 34 | (Slovakia) Lukáš Urminský |
| DF | 14 | (Slovakia) Šimon Kupec |
| DF | 22 | (Slovakia) Jozef Menich |
| MF | 8 | (Slovakia) Dalibor Takáč | | (substituted in) 82' |
| MF | 9 | (Slovakia) Dominik Kunca | | (substituted in) 89' |
| MF | 20 | (North Macedonia) Tihomir Kostadinov | | (substituted in) 75' |
| FW | 31 | (Czech Republic) David Čapek |
Manager:
(Slovakia) Norbert Hrnčár

Assistant referees:
Dušan Hrčka
Gabriel Ádám
Fourth official:
Miroslav Benko

Match rules

- 90 minutes.
- 30 minutes of extra time if necessary.
- Penalty shoot-out if scores still level.

== See also ==
- 2017–18 Slovak Cup
- 2018–19 UEFA Europa League
- 2018 Slovak Cup
