= Chudý =

Chudý (feminine: Chudá) or Chudy is a surname. Notable people with the surname include:

- Martin Chudý (born 1989), Slovak footballer
- N.U. Unruh (birthname Andrew Chudy, born 1957), German musician and instrument inventor
