= Reagy Ofosu =

German footballer (born 1991)

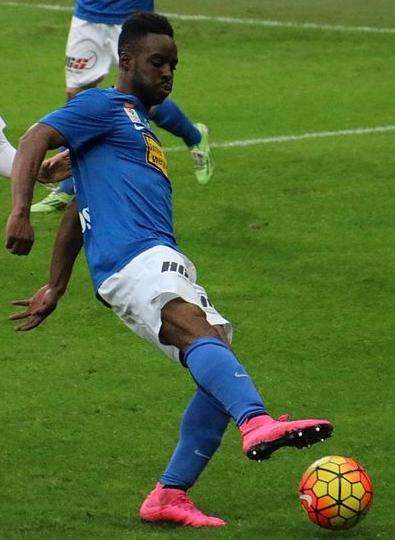
- Ofosu with SV Grödig

Personal information
- Full name: Reagy Baah Ofosu
- Date of birth: 20 September 1991 (age 35)
- Place of birth: Hamburg, Germany
- Height: 1.75 m (5 ft 9 in)
- Position: Winger

Team information
- Current team: Kuala Lumpur City
- Number: 10

Youth career
- 1999–2005: Harburger TB
- 2005–2010: Hamburger SV

Senior career*
| Years | Team | Apps | (Gls) |
| 2010–2012 | Hamburger SV II | 42 | (8) |
| 2012–2014 | FC Ingolstadt 04 II | 41 | (14) |
| 2014–2016 | Chemnitzer FC | 49 | (4) |
| 2016 | SV Grödig | 16 | (2) |
| 2016–2017 | NEC | 16 | (2) |
| 2017–2018 | Istra 1961 | 14 | (3) |
| 2018 | Spartak Trnava | 13 | (2) |
| 2018–2019 | Haladás | 23 | (0) |
| 2019–2020 | Botoșani | 40 | (7) |
| 2020–2021 | Universitatea Craiova | 20 | (2) |
| 2021–2022 | Bursaspor | 16 | (1) |
| 2022–2023 | Ionikos | 3 | (0) |
| 2023 | Ohod | | |
| 2023–2024 | UTA Arad | 8 | (1) |
| 2024 | Botoșani | 10 | (1) |
| 2024–2025 | Şanlıurfaspor | 15 | (1) |
| 2026– | Kuala Lumpur City | 1 | (0) |
- * Club domestic league appearances and goals as of 12 September 2026

Reagy Baah Ofosu (born 20 September 1991) is a German professional footballer who plays as a winger for Malaysia Super League club Kuala Lumpur City.

== Club career ==
On 8 June 2014, it was announced that he would be joining German 3rd division club Chemnitzer FC on a free transfer.

On 18 January 2018, it was announced that Ofosu would be joining Slovak club Spartak Trnava. He made his debut for the club in a 4–1 win over ViOn Zlaté Moravce, coming on as a substitute in the 64” minute. He scored the winning goal in a 1–0 win over rivals Slovan Bratislava in the Traditional derby. Ofosu would later became the Slovak champion with Spartak Trnava in 2017–18 season.

On 8 January 2023, Ofosu joined Saudi Arabian club Ohod.

== International career ==
In 2023, Ofosu who was born in Hamburg, made his choices clear during an interview stating that given the choice between the two countries, he would opt to play for his country of birth Ghana.

== Honours ==
Spartak Trnava

- Slovak Super Liga: 2017–18

Universitatea Craiova

- Cupa României: 2020–21
- Supercupa României: 2021
