= Tomáš Brigant =

Slovak footballer

Personal information
- Full name: Tomáš Brigant
- Date of birth: 11 October 1994 (age 32)
- Place of birth: Považská Bystrica, Slovakia
- Height: 1.69 m (5 ft 7 in)
- Position: Winger

Team information
- Current team: FC Petržalka
- Number: 10

Youth career
- 2001–2003: TJ Manín Podmanín
- 2003–2008: Považská Bystrica
- 2008–2011: Dubnica

Senior career*
| Years | Team | Apps | (Gls) |
| 2011–2013 | Dubnica | | |
| 2013 | AS Trenčín | 0 | (0) |
| 2014–2017 | Zbrojovka Brno | 29 | (1) |
| 2014 | → Líšeň (loan) | 3 | (1) |
| 2016 | → Spartak Myjava (loan) | 13 | (0) |
| 2017 | → Senica (loan) | 12 | (1) |
| 2017–2019 | Spartak Trnava | 15 | (1) |
| 2019–2021 | Partizán Bardejov | 36 | (3) |
| 2021– | Skalica | 17 | (1) |
| 2022– | → FC Petržalka (loan) | 20 | (1) |

International career
| 2015–2017 | Slovakia U21 | 11 | (0) |
- * Club domestic league appearances and goals as of 23 May 2023

Tomáš Brigant (born 11 October 1994) is a Slovak footballer who plays for FC Petržalka on loan from MFK Skalica as a winger.

== Club career ==
He was signed by Spartak Trnava in July 2017.

== Honours ==
Spartak Trnava

- Slovak Super Liga: 2017–18
- Slovak Cup: 2018–19
