= Ivan Hladík =

Slovak footballer (born 1993)

Personal information
- Full name: Ivan Hladík
- Date of birth: 30 January 1993 (age 33)
- Place of birth: Stará Turá, Slovakia
- Height: 1.95 m (6 ft 5 in)
- Position: Centre-back

Youth career
- 1999–2004: Stará Turá
- 2004–2008: Spartak Myjava
- 2008–2009: Sparta Trenčín
- 2009–2010: Trenčín

Senior career*
Years	Team	Apps	(Gls)
2010–2016	Senica	20	(0)
2012–2013	→ Baník Ružiná (loan)	31	(1)
2013	→ Vrbové (loan)		
2014–2015	→ Rimavská Sobota (loan)	37	(2)
2016–2018	Spartak Trnava	48	(4)
2019–2021	Sūduva Marijampolė	30	(0)
2021–2022	Puszcza Niepołomice	28	(0)
2022	Stal Stalowa Wola	9	(1)
2022–2024	Sereď		
2024	Slavoj Boleráz		
2025	Gottsdorf-Marbach-Persenbeug		

International career
2009	Slovakia U17	7	(0)
2010–2012	Slovakia U19	17	(1)
- * Club domestic league appearances and goals

Ivan Hladík (born 30 January 1993) is a Slovak professional footballer who plays as a centre-back.

== Club career ==
Hladík made his first league appearance for Senica on 23 July 2011, coming on as a substitute for Jan Kalabiška in the 43rd minute of a 2–3 away loss against Slovan Bratislava.

In June 2016, he was signed by Spartak Trnava.

On 25 January 2021, he joined I liga side Puszcza Niepołomice on a two-year deal. He left the club by mutual consent on 15 February 2022.

On 18 February 2022, Hladík signed a one-and-a-half-year deal with Stal Stalowa Wola. In his league debut on 12 March 2022 against Wisłoka Dębica, he scored Stal’s first goal and was given a red card after a foul on Łukasz Siedlik in a 2–2 draw.

== Honours ==
Spartak Trnava

- Slovak Super Liga: 2017–18

Sūduva

- A Lyga: 2019
- Lithuanian Football Cup: 2019
