= Martin Vantruba =

Slovak footballer (born 1998)

Personal information
- Date of birth: 7 February 1998 (age 28)
- Place of birth: Trnava, Slovakia
- Height: 1.96 m (6 ft 5 in)
- Position: Goalkeeper

Team information
- Current team: Spartak Trnava
- Number: 72

Youth career
- 2006–2013: Lokomotíva Trnava
- 2013–2016: Spartak Trnava

Senior career*
Years	Team	Apps	(Gls)
2016–2018	Spartak Trnava	18	(0)
2018–2021	Slavia Prague	0	(0)
2018	→ Spartak Trnava (loan)	7	(0)
2019	→ Železiarne Podbrezová (loan)	13	(0)
2019–2020	→ Pohronie (loan)	11	(0)
2020	→ Příbram (loan)	0	(0)
2020–2021	→ Nordsjælland (loan)	1	(0)
2021–2022	DAC Dunajská Streda	0	(0)
2021–2022	→ ŠTK Šamorín (loan)	5	(0)
2022–	Spartak Trnava	36	(0)

International career
2014	Slovakia U16	1	(0)
2016	Slovakia U18	4	(0)
2016–2017	Slovakia U19	8	(0)
2018	Slovakia U20	1	(0)
2019	Slovakia U21	8	(0)
- * Club domestic league appearances and goals as of 21 November 2026

Martin Vantruba (born 7 February 1998) is a Slovak footballer who plays for Spartak Trnava as a goalkeeper.

== Club career ==
Vantruba was promoted to Spartak Trnava first team in summer 2016. He made his league debut for Trnava on 28 July 2017 against Podbrezová. In the same season, Vantruba played 25 league games, keeping 11 clean sheets and helping Spartak win its first title after 45 years.

=== Slavia ===
In January 2018, he signed a four-and-a-half-year contract with Slavia Prague, but was loaned back to Spartak Trnava for the rest of the season.

==== Podbrezová (loan) ====
In January 2019, Vantruba joined Železiarne Podbrezová on loan until the end of the season. He made his debut for the club in a 1–0 home defeat against MFK Ružomberok. In the spring, he played 13 games for Železiari, keeping four clean sheets. However, after the season, Podbrezová were relegated to the second league and Vantruba returned to Slavia Prague.

==== Pohronie (loan) ====
In July 2019, he went on loan to 2. Liga club FK Pohronie. He played 11 league games in the autumn, keeping two clean sheets. After the final round of the autumn, he returned to Slavia.

=== Return to Spartak Trnava ===
In June 2022, Vantruba re-signed with Spartak Trnava after four seasons. Post arrival, he expressed disappointment about the fact that he spent most of his tenure with Slavia Prague on loans, but he highly valued the experienced and looked forward to cooperating with Dominik Takáč and progressing with Spartak through Conference League qualifiers. In the 2022–23 Slovak Cup, Vantruba was in goal in the final against Slovan Bratislava, where he helped his team win its eighth cup title in its history. In 2024, he signed an extension to his contract until 2026. In a penalty shootout against FC ŠTK 1914 Šamorín in the Slovak Cup, Vantruba saved the last penalty to help his team advance to the next round.

== International career ==
Vantruba was a member of the Slovak youth national teams U16, U18, U19, U20 and U21.

== Personal life ==
He has a twin brother named Tomáš who is also a footballer. He currently plays for 3. Liga club FK Inter Bratislava. Tomáś also played 2 games for Spartak. While playing for ŠKF Sereď, the two brothers would play against each other in the Slovak Cup.

== Honours ==
Spartak Trnava

- Slovak First League: 2017–18
- Slovak Cup: 2022–23, 2024–25
