= Ján Vlasko =

Slovak footballer (born 1990)

Personal information
- Date of birth: 11 January 1990 (age 36)
- Place of birth: Bojnice, Czechoslovakia
- Height: 1.79 m (5 ft 10 in)
- Position: Attacking midfielder

Youth career
- –2003: Prievidza
- 2003–2006: Dubnica nad Váhom
- 2007: Sparta Prague

Senior career*
Years	Team	Apps	(Gls)
2007–2012	Slovan Liberec	10	(0)
2009	→ Dubnica nad Váhom (loan)	6	(0)
2009	→ Zenit Čáslav (loan)	10	(1)
2010	→ Senica (loan)	9	(0)
2012–2015	Spartak Trnava	76	(17)
2015–2017	Zagłębie Lubin	26	(0)
2017–2018	Spartak Trnava	22	(3)
2018–2020	Puskás Akadémia	7	(1)
2020–2022	Spartak Trnava	40	(5)
2022–2025	Skalica	72	(10)

International career
2008–2009	Slovakia U19	11	(4)
2011	Slovakia U21	2	(0)
- * Club domestic league appearances and goals as of 25 June 2025

Ján Vlasko (born 11 January 1990) is a former Slovak professional footballer who played as an attacking midfielder. He is most known for his time with Spartak Trnava, where he would help the club win its first league title in 45 years.

In his career, he played for several Slovak and foreign clubs, winning the league title with Spartak Trnava in 2018 and adding a triumph in the Slovak Cup four years later.

Vlasko retired from professional football in 2025.

== Club career ==
=== Early career ===
Born in Bojnice, Vlasko began playing youth football for Prievidza. He also played for the youth sides of Sparta Prague and Dubnica.

=== Liberec ===
In 2007, Vlasko joined Czech Gambrinus liga side Slovan Liberec. He made his professional debut for Slovan Liberec, entering as a second-half substitute against Sparta Prague, in May 2007.

=== Spartak Trnava ===
In February 2013, it was announced that Vlako would be transferring to Slovak first league club, Spartak Trnava. He made his league debut for Spartak in a 1–1 draw against MŠK Žilina. In the 2014/2015 Fortuna league season, he scored 11 league goals in 30 appearances. In July 2015, he started a match for Trnava in the first qualifying round of the 2015/16 UEFA Europa League against the Bosnian club FK Olimpik Sarajevo, where Spartak would advance.

=== Zaglebie Lubin ===
After the Europa League qualifying round in July 2015, Vlasko was bought by Polish club Zaglebie Lubin for €180,000, where he signed a three-year contract. However, he did not get many opportunities on the pitch in the Polish team and on September 1, 2017, he agreed to terminate his contract.

=== Return to Spartak ===
After the end of his contract with Zaglebie, he returned to Spartak Trnava in September 2017. In the 2017/2018 season, he played 20 matches for the club in the Fortuna League and scored 2 goals, contributing to the league title. In the 2018/19 season, Vlasko scored the winning goal in a 1–0 win against FC ViOn Zlaté Moravce, converting a penalty in the 60th minute. In the Champions League, he scored a goal in the 93rd minute in the 2nd qualifying round against Legia Warsaw, securing a 2–0 away win for Spartak. In August 2018, Vlasko left Spartak Trnava to join Puskás Akadémia FC after a disagreement with the new head coach of Trnava.

== Honours ==
Zagłębie Lubin II

- IV liga Lower Silesia West: 2016–17

Spartak Trnava

- Fortuna Liga: 2017–18
- Slovnaft Cup: 2021–22
