= Lukáš Greššák =

Slovak footballer

Personal information
- Date of birth: 23 January 1989 (age 37)
- Place of birth: Trstená, Czechoslovakia
- Height: 1.83 m (6 ft 0 in)
- Positions: Defensive midfielder; centre-back

Youth career
- 1998–2004: FK Slovan Trstená
- 2004: FC Junior – Radvaň
- 2004: FK Slovan Trstená
- 2004–2008: Ružomberok

Senior career*
Years	Team	Apps	(Gls)
2008–2014	Ružomberok	93	(1)
2014–2018	Spartak Trnava	102	(0)
2019	Zagłębie Sosnowiec	12	(0)
2019–2023	Sigma Olomouc	70	(2)
2023–2024	FC Košice	23	(1)
2024–2025	Zlaté Moravce	22	(1)
2025-	FC Nitra	30	(1)
- * Club domestic league appearances and goals as of 5 July 2025

Lukáš Greššák (born 23 January 1989) is a Slovak professional footballer who plays for FC Nitra as a defensive midfielder or a centre-back.

== Club career ==
He was signed by Spartak Trnava in August 2014 and made his debut for them against Košice on 24 August 2014.

== Honours ==
Spartak Trnava

- Slovak Super Liga: 2017–18
