= Andrej Kadlec =

Slovak footballer

Personal information
- Date of birth: 2 February 1996 (age 30)
- Place of birth: Ilava, Slovakia
- Height: 1.77 m (5 ft 10 in)
- Position: Right back

Team information
- Current team: Nitra
- Number: 6

Youth career
- 2001–2011: Púchov
- 2011–2014: Žilina

Senior career*
Years	Team	Apps	(Gls)
2014–2015	Žilina	9	(0)
2016–2019	Spartak Trnava	63	(2)
2019–2021	Jagiellonia Białystok	30	(1)
2021	Orion Tip Sereď	16	(4)
2022	MTK Budapest	20	(0)
2022–2023	Bruk-Bet Termalica	28	(1)
2023–2025	Mladá Boleslav	26	(0)
2025	→ Ružomberok (loan)	7	(0)
2025–	Nitra	22	(1)

International career
2013	Slovakia U17	7	(0)
2014–2015	Slovakia U19	8	(0)
2018	Slovakia U21	3	(0)
- * Club domestic league appearances and goals as of 15:58, 27 September 2025 (UTC)

Andrej Kadlec (born 2 February 1996) is a Slovak professional footballer who plays as a right back for 4. Liga club Nitra.

== Club career ==
He made his Fortuna Liga debut for Žilina on 26 April 2014 against Spartak Trnava, entering in as a substitute.

== Honours ==
Spartak Trnava

- Fortuna Liga: 2017–18
