= Vakhtang Chanturishvili =

Georgian footballer

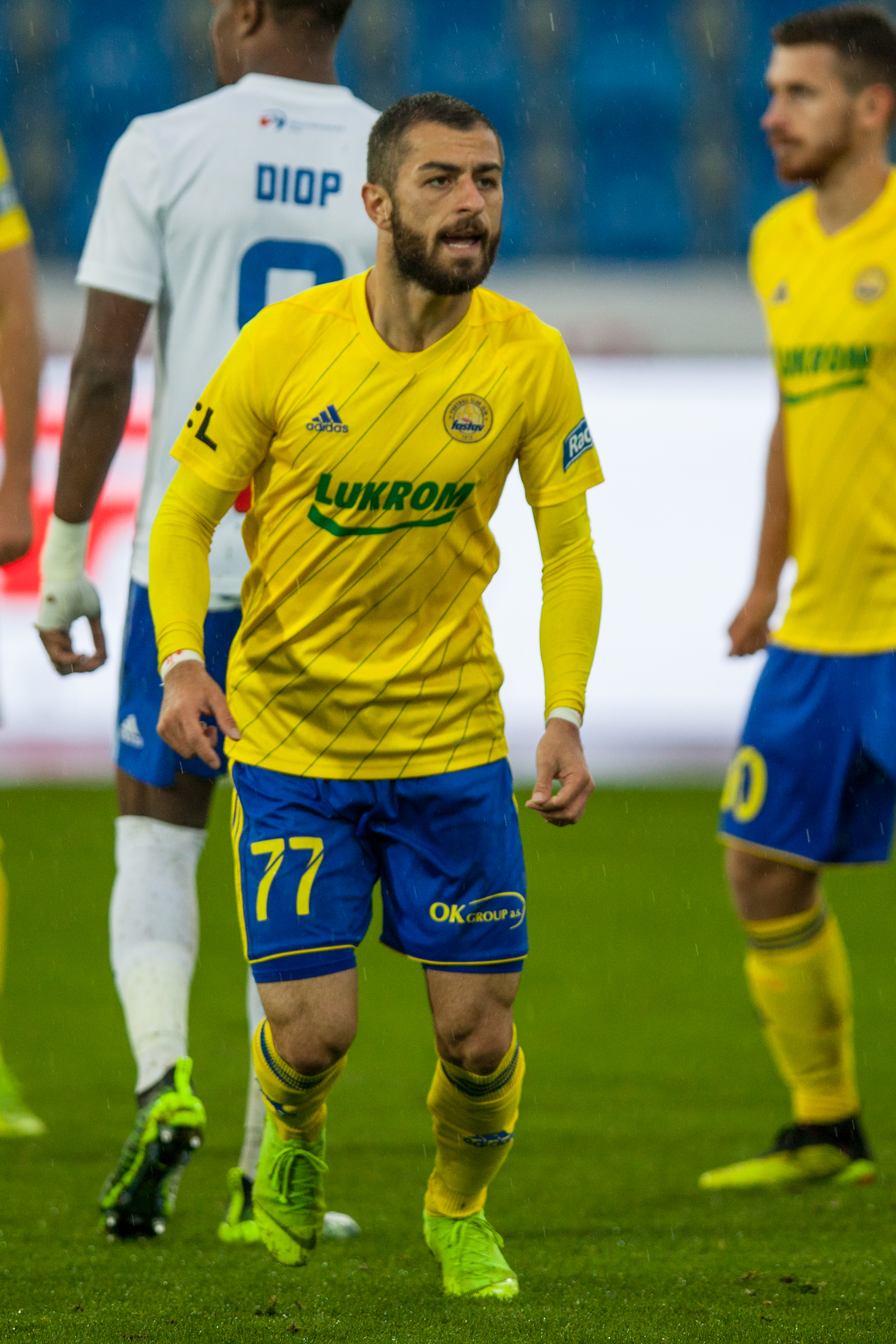

Personal information
- Date of birth: 5 August 1993 (age 33)
- Place of birth: Ozurgeti, Georgia
- Height: 1.73 m (5 ft 8 in)
- Position: Left winger

Team information
- Current team: Jablonec
- Number: 7

Youth career
- Sasco Tbilisi

Senior career*
Years	Team	Apps	(Gls)
2010–2011	Norchi Dinamoeli Tbilisi	14	(3)
2012–2014	Zestaponi	21	(2)
2015–2016	Dinamo Tbilisi	46	(12)
2017	Oleksandriya	4	(0)
2017–2018	Spartak Trnava	40	(8)
2019–2023	Zlín	114	(5)
2023–	Jablonec	113	(7)

International career
2016–2018	Georgia	5	(0)
Medal record
Dinamo Tbilisi
Winner	Georgian Cup	2014–15; 2015–16
Spartak Trnava
Winner	Fortuna Liga	2017–18
Winner	Slovnaft Cup	2018–19
- * Club domestic league appearances and goals as of 20 October 2026

Vakhtang Chanturishvili (Georgian: ვახტანგ ჭანტურიშვილი; born 5 August 1993) is a Georgian footballer who plays as a left winger for Czech First League club Jablonec.

== Personal life ==
Chanturishvili was born in Ozurgeti. He learned to speak Czech fluently. He has two children.

== Club career ==
Chanturishvili started his career in Norchi Dinamoeli. He made his debut for the team on 23 August 2013 in a match against FC Samgurali Tskaltubo.

At the beginning of 2019, Chanturishvili transferred to the Czech First League club Zlín. He appeared in 114 league matches for the club and scored five goals. In June 2023, he joined Czech First League side Jablonec. At this club, too, he established himself as a regular in the starting lineup. In the 2024–25 season, he played 3,092 minutes—more than any other outfield player in the league. In October 2026, he extended his contract with Jablonec until the summer of 2029.

== International career ==
In May 2016, Chanturishvili was called up and earned his first cap with the senior team in a 3–1 loss against Slovakia on 27 May. He was replaced in the 45th minute.

== Honours ==
Zestaponi

- Georgian League: 2011–12
- Georgian Super Cup: 2012, 2013

Dinamo Tbilisi

- Georgian League: 2015–16
- Georgian Cup: 2014–15, 2015–16
- Georgian Super Cup: 2015

Spartak Trnava

- Slovak Super Liga: 2017–18
