= Blažej Vaščák =

Slovak footballer (born 1983)

Personal information
- Full name: Blažej Vaščák
- Date of birth: 21 November 1983 (age 42)
- Place of birth: Krompachy, Czechoslovakia
- Height: 1.85 m (6 ft 1 in)
- Position: Midfielder

Youth career
- FK Široké
- Pokrok Krompachy
- 2000–2001: 1. FC Košice

Senior career*
Years	Team	Apps	(Gls)
2001–2003	1. FC Košice	16	(0)
2003	Steel Trans Ličartovce		
2003	Artmedia Petržalka	16	(2)
2004	Laugaricio Trenčín	14	(1)
2004–2005	Artmedia Petržalka	42	(8)
2006–2007	Treviso	29	(0)
2007–2009	Lecce	12	(1)
2007–2008	→ Cesena (loan)	22	(0)
2009	→ Teplice (loan)	7	(0)
2009–2010	MFK Košice	20	(0)
2010–2011	Polonia Bytom	25	(2)
2012–2013	Partizán Bardejov	15	(9)
2012–2013	→ ŽP Šport Podbrezová (loan)	24	(5)
2013–2016	ŽP Šport Podbrezová	78	(22)
2016	Lokomotíva Košice	1	(0)
2017	Skalica	12	(0)
2017–2018	Senica	26	(2)
2018–2019	Zemplín Michalovce	18	(2)
2019	→ Dukla Banská Bystrica (loan)	10	(3)
2019–2020	Dukla Banská Bystrica	18	(3)
2020–2021	POKROK SEZ Krompachy		

International career
2007–2008	Slovakia	4	(0)
- * Club domestic league appearances and goals

Blažej Vaščák (born 21 November 1983) is a Slovak former professional footballer who played as a midfielder.

== Career ==
Vaščák started his professional career with Slovak side Košice. With the club he made 16 appearances in two season. In 2003, he moved to AS Trenčín, and in just six months scored one goal in a total of 14 appearances. Following an impressive spell, he moved to Artmedia Petržalka and would score nine goals in 57 appearances over the course of two seasons. He then moved to Italy with Serie A side Treviso. In his first season with the club, they were relegated to Serie B. He would maintain a starting spot and score 5 goals in just over 30 appearances. In 2007, he moved to fellow Serie B side Lecce for €600,000 in co-ownership deal, making 12 appearances and scoring once. In June 2007 Lecce bought him outright for undisclosed fee. He was loaned out to Cesena the following season and made 29 starts. Following a less than perfect spell in Italy, the 24-year-old moved to the Czech Republic to play for Teplice. Vaščák made his Gambrinus liga debut on 29 March 2009, against Příbram and he overall played 7 matches for Teplice and came back to Lecce.

Vaščák terminated the contract with Lecce in mutual consent in July 2009.

In September 2009, he returned to Košice as a free agent. After a season at Košice, Vaščák joined the Polish side Polonia Bytom in the summer of 2011. He left the club a year later. In March 2012, Vaščák became a player of the 3. liga team Partizán Bardejov. He scored two goals on his debut in a 5–0 win at home to Sokol Dolná Ždaňa. Vaščák spent the following season on loan at ŽP Šport Podbrezová, signing permanently for the club in the summer of 2013.

== Honours ==
Artmedia Petržalka

- Slovak First Football League: 2004–05
- Slovak Cup: 2003–04
- Slovak Super Cup: 2005

Teplice

- Czech Cup: 2008–09
