= Martin Chudý =

Slovak footballer (born 1989)

Personal information
- Full name: Martin Chudý
- Date of birth: 23 April 1989 (age 37)
- Place of birth: Považská Bystrica, Czechoslovakia
- Height: 1.87 m (6 ft 2 in)
- Position: Goalkeeper

Team information
- Current team: Dynamo Malženice
- Number: 31

Youth career
- Považská Bystrica
- 2004–2009: Nitra

Senior career*
Years	Team	Apps	(Gls)
2009–2013	Nitra	58	(0)
2014	Graffin Vlašim	10	(0)
2014–2015	Dukla Prague	10	(0)
2016–2017	Teplice	12	(0)
2017–2018	Spartak Trnava	17	(0)
2019–2021	Górnik Zabrze	84	(0)
2021–2022	Orion Tip Sereď	18	(0)
2022–2023	Concordia Chiajna	11	(0)
2023–2024	Arka Gdynia	5	(0)
2025–2026	Zlaté Moravce	5	(0)
2026–	Dynamo Malženice	1	(0)

International career
2005–2006	Slovakia U17		
2006–2007	Slovakia U18		
2007–2008	Slovakia U19		
2008–2009	Slovakia U20		
2009–2010	Slovakia U21		
- * Club domestic league appearances and goals as of 25 May 2026

Martin Chudý (born 23 April 1989) is a Slovak professional footballer who plays as a goalkeeper for Slovak club Dynamo Malženice.

== Club career ==
In February 2014, Chudý transferred to the second-division Czech club FC Graffin Vlašim, who were fighting for survival. Vlašim coach Vlastimil Petržela was interested in him.

=== Dukla Prague ===
In June 2014, he agreed to join the first-division club FK Dukla Praha. At the beginning of the 2014/15 season, he started as the first-choice goalkeeper for the injured Filip Radu and did well, keeping four clean sheets in the first five matches. In the eighth round, his series of good performances was cut short by 1. FC Slovácko, who scored 5 goals against Dukla in a 1–5 defeat.

He was transferred to Teplice in January 2016 due to weight problems. In Teplice, he played as a second-choice goalkeeper, appearing in four league matches in his first season.

=== Spartak Trnava ===
In August 2017, Chudý returned to Slovakia, joining FC Spartak Trnava. With Spartak, he would win his first trophy, the Slovak league title. The next season, Chudý would also help the club qualify to the UEFA Europa League for the first time in its history. He would make an important last minute save in the second leg of the play-off to the competition against NK Olimpija Ljubljana. At the end of 2018, he left Spartak Trnava.

=== Sered’ ===
On 20 November 2021, it was announced that Chudý would be joining ŠKF Sereď, signing a contract until the end of the year. He made his debut for the club in a 3–1 win against FK Pohronie. Chudý kept a clean sheet in a historic 1–0 away win against his former club, Spartak Trnava. Altogether, he kept 4 clean sheets in 18 appearances for Sered’.

== Honours ==
Spartak Trnava

- Fortuna Liga: 2017–18
