= Erik Jirka =

Slovak footballer (born 1997)

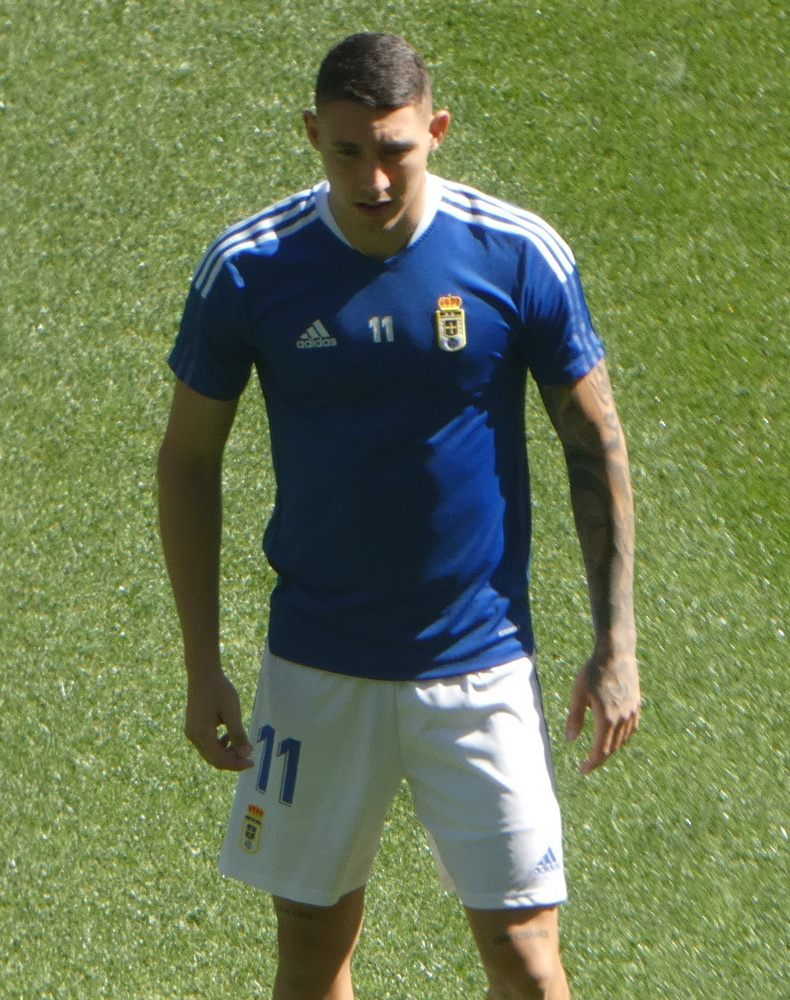
- Jirka with Real Oviedo in 2021

Personal information
- Date of birth: 19 September 1997 (age 29)
- Place of birth: Trnava, Slovakia
- Height: 1.82 m (6 ft 0 in)
- Position: Winger

Team information
- Current team: GKS Katowice
- Number: 97

Youth career
- 2005–2016: Spartak Trnava

Senior career*
Years	Team	Apps	(Gls)
2014–2018	Spartak Trnava	76	(12)
2019–2021	Red Star Belgrade	6	(0)
2019	→ Radnički Niš (loan)	16	(4)
2020	→ Górnik Zabrze (loan)	17	(4)
2020–2021	→ Mirandés (loan)	32	(5)
2021–2022	Oviedo	19	(0)
2022–2024	Viktoria Plzeň	61	(10)
2025–2026	Piast Gliwice	32	(5)
2026–	GKS Katowice	16	(1)

International career
2015–2016	Slovakia U18	5	(0)
2017	Slovakia U19	6	(1)
2017–2018	Slovakia U21	11	(1)
2021–2023	Slovakia	10	(2)
- * Club domestic league appearances and goals as of 22:24, 12 August 2026 (UTC)

Erik Jirka (born 19 September 1997) is a Slovak professional footballer who plays as a winger for Ekstraklasa club GKS Katowice.

== Club career ==
=== Spartak Trnava ===
Jirka is a product of the Spartak Trnava youth academy. During the spring round of the 2013–14 season, he was included in the Spartak B team. On 25 May 2014, in the 32nd round of the 2nd League match against FK Pohronie, he made his senior debut. In the 2014–15 season, he was registered as a first-team player, although he mainly played for the reserves. On 8 November 2014, he made his debut for Spartak's first team in an away 0–0 draw against MFK Ružomberok, coming on off the bench in stoppage time for Ján Vlasko. On 18 April 2015, he scored his first goal for Spartak B in the 3rd round of the 2nd League match against FK Pohronie, which was also his first goal at senior level. In the 2016–17 season, he became a full first-team player. On 14 July 2016, in an away match in the second qualifying round of the Europa League against Armenian club Shirak Gyumri, he scored his debut goal for the Spartak first team. Shortly afterwards, on 31 July 2016, in an away match against MFK Ružomberok, which ended in a 1–1 draw, he recorded his first top-flight goal. In the 2017–18 season, Jirka won the Slovak league title with Spartak.

=== Red Star Belgrade ===
In September 2018, Jirka signed a four-year contract with Red Star Belgrade, effective from January 2019.

Jirka made six league appearances and one cup appearance for Red Star during the second half of the 2018–19 season. The club won the Serbian SuperLiga title at the end of the campaign.

==== Loan to Radnički Niš ====
On 4 July 2019, Jirka and his Red Star teammate Dejan Meleg joined Radnički Niš on loan. The club had finished as runners-up in the previous Serbian league campaign and was preparing for the qualifying rounds of the UEFA Europa League.

He made 19 appearances in all competitions for Radnički, including 16 in the Serbian SuperLiga, and scored four goals. His loan was ended during the following winter transfer window.

==== Loan to Górnik Zabrze ====
In January 2020, Jirka moved to Poland, joining Górnik Zabrze on loan until the end of the 2019–20 season. The agreement included an option for Górnik to make the transfer permanent.

Jirka made his Ekstraklasa debut for Górnik on 14 February 2020. He finished the campaign with 17 league appearances and four goals. Górnik did not exercise their option to purchase him, and he returned to Red Star after the season.

==== Loan to Mirandés ====
On 11 August 2020, Jirka joined Spanish Segunda División club CD Mirandés on a season-long loan. The agreement contained an option for a permanent transfer.

He became a regular member of the team, making 32 league appearances and scoring five goals during the 2020–21 season. Mirandés finished tenth in the Segunda División.

=== Real Oviedo ===
After leaving Red Star, Jirka remained in Spain. On 17 July 2021, he signed a two-year contract with Real Oviedo, with an option for an additional season if specified objectives were achieved.

During the 2021–22 season, Jirka made 19 league appearances, seven of them as a starter. He also scored in his only Copa del Rey appearance. On 9 August 2022, Oviedo announced that his contract had been terminated by mutual agreement.

=== Viktoria Plzeň ===
On 11 August 2022, Jirka joined reigning Czech champions Viktoria Plzeň as a free agent, signing a three-year contract.

He made eight appearances in the 2022–23 UEFA Champions League, including matches in a group containing FC Barcelona, FC Bayern Munich and Inter Milan. In October 2022, he scored his first two league goals for Viktoria in a 3–0 away victory against FC Zlín.

During the following season, Jirka scored a stoppage-time penalty in a 2–1 Conference League qualifying victory over Drita, which secured Viktoria's progression to the next round. In November 2023, he scored both goals in a 2–1 away league victory against Slavia Prague.

Jirka represented Viktoria in the Champions League, Europa League and Conference League. He left the club in December 2024 after making 83 competitive appearances, scoring eleven goals and providing nine assists.

=== Piast Gliwice ===
On 30 December 2024, Jirka returned to Poland and signed for Piast Gliwice as a free agent. His contract ran until 31 May 2026 and included an option for an additional year.

He made 16 appearances in all competitions during the second half of the 2024–25 season. During the autumn part of the following campaign, he became Piast's leading league goalscorer, scoring five times in 17 Ekstraklasa appearances. In total, he played 36 competitive matches for Piast and scored five goals.

=== GKS Katowice ===
On 12 January 2026, Jirka transferred permanently from Piast to GKS Katowice. He signed a two-and-a-half-year contract, valid until June 2028, with an option for an extension.

During the remainder of the 2025–26 season, Jirka made 14 league appearances and scored once. He also appeared twice and scored one goal in the Polish Cup.

He made his first European appearance for GKS in July 2026, starting in a 3–1 victory over MŠK Žilina in the second qualifying round of the 2026–27 UEFA Conference League. As of 10 August 2026, Jirka had made 19 competitive appearances and scored two goals for GKS.

== International career ==
Jirka represented Slovakia at under-18, under-19 and under-21 level. He received his first senior call-up in November 2020, but did not appear in the match against the Czech Republic.

He made his senior international debut on 1 June 2021, coming on as a substitute in a 1–1 friendly draw against Bulgaria in Austria.

In March 2022, Jirka was added to the Slovak squad for friendly matches against Norway and Finland after Ivan Schranz withdrew. On 29 March, he scored his first senior international goal in a 2–0 victory over Finland in Murcia, Spain.

Jirka scored his second international goal on 22 September 2022, equalising in stoppage time of a Nations League match against Azerbaijan. Azerbaijan scored again two minutes later to win the match 2–1. He made ten senior appearances and scored two goals for Slovakia between 2021 and 2023.

== Career statistics ==
=== Club ===
As of match played 12 August 2026

Appearances and goals by club, season and competition
Club	Season	League			National cup (Note: Includes Slovak Cup, Serbian Cup, Copa del Rey, Czech Cup, Polish Cup)		Continental		Other		Total	
Club	Season	Division	Apps	Goals	Apps	Goals	Apps	Goals	Apps	Goals	Apps	Goals
Spartak Trnava	2014–15	Slovak First League	2	0	—		—		—		2	0
Spartak Trnava	2015–16	Slovak First League	0	0	0	0	1 (Note: Appearance(s) in UEFA Europa League)	0	—		1	0
Spartak Trnava	2016–17	Slovak First League	30	6	2	0	6	1	—		38	7
Spartak Trnava	2017–18	Slovak First League	29	6	3	0	—		—		32	6
Spartak Trnava	2018–19	Slovak First League	15	0	1	0	14 (Note: Six appearances and one goal in UEFA Champions League, eight appearances in UEFA Europa League)	1	—		6	3
Spartak Trnava	Total		76	12	6	0	21	2	—		103	14
Red Star Belgrade	2018–19	Serbian SuperLiga	6	0	1	0	—		—		7	0
Radnički Niš (loan)	2019–20	Serbian SuperLiga	16	4	1	0	2	0	—		19	4
Górnik Zabrze (loan)	2019–20	Ekstraklasa	17	4	—		—		—		17	4
Mirandés (loan)	2020–21	Segunda División	32	5	0	0	—		—		32	5
Real Oviedo	2021–22	Segunda División	19	0	1	1	—		—		20	1
Viktoria Plzeň	2022–23	Czech First League	28	2	1	0	8 (Note: Appearances in UEFA Champions League)	0	—		37	2
Viktoria Plzeň	2023–24	Czech First League	21	5	0	0	4 (Note: Appearances in UEFA Conference League)	1	—		25	6
Viktoria Plzeň	2024–25	Czech First League	12	3	1	0	8	0	—		21	3
Viktoria Plzeň	Total		61	10	2	0	20	1	0	0	83	11
Piast Gliwice	2024–25	Ekstraklasa	15	0	1	0	—		—		16	0
Piast Gliwice	2025–26	Ekstraklasa	17	5	3	0	—		—		20	5
Piast Gliwice	Total		32	5	4	0	—		—		36	5
GKS Katowice	2025–26	Ekstraklasa	14	1	2	1	—		—		16	2
GKS Katowice	2026–27	Ekstraklasa	2	0	0	0	3	0	—		5	0
GKS Katowice	Total		16	1	2	1	3	0	—		21	2
Career total			275	41	17	2	46	3	0	0	338	46

=== International ===
Appearances and goals by national team and year
National team	Year	Apps	Goals
Slovakia
Slovakia	2021	5	0
Slovakia	2022	4	2
Slovakia	2023	1	0
Total		10	2

Scores and results list Slovakia's goal tally first, score column indicates score after each Jirka goal.

List of international goals scored by Erik Jirka
No.	Date	Venue	Opponent	Score	Result	Competition
1	29 March 2022	Estadio Nueva Condomina, Murcia, Spain	Finland	2–0	2–0	Friendly
2	22 September 2022	Anton Malatinský Stadium, Trnava, Slovakia	Azerbaijan	1–1	1–2	2022–23 UEFA Nations League C

== Honours ==
Spartak Trnava

- Fortuna Liga: 2017–18

Red Star Belgrade

- Serbian SuperLiga: 2018–19
