= Peter Gál-Andrezly =

Slovak footballer

Personal information
- Full name: Peter Gál-Andrezly
- Date of birth: 3 May 1990 (age 36)
- Place of birth: Košice, Czechoslovakia
- Height: 1.72 m (5 ft 7 1/2 in)
- Positions: Midfielder; full-back

Team information
- Current team: Bihor Oradea
- Number: 77

Youth career
- –2004: 1. FC Košice
- 2004–2006: Rapid Wien
- 2006–2010: MFK Košice
- 2009: → Middlesbrough (loan)

Senior career*
Years	Team	Apps	(Gls)
2010–2013	Košice	33	(0)
2014	Znojmo	9	(0)
2014–2015	Šport Podbrezová	43	(7)
2016–2019	Ružomberok	105	(16)
2019–2021	Sepsi OSK	25	(2)
2021–2026	FK Csíkszereda	112	(8)
2026–	Bihor Oradea	17	(0)

International career
2008–2009	Slovakia U19	6	(4)
- * Club domestic league appearances and goals as of 31 October 2026

Peter Gál-Andrezly (born 3 May 1990) is a Slovak professional footballer who plays as a midfielder or a full-back for Liga II club Bihor Oradea.

== Career ==
Gal-Andrezly began his career with MFK Kosice and was in 2007 promoted to the seniorside of the Corgoň Liga. Middlesbrough signed him in January 2009 on loan for 6 months. He joined the Middlesbrough reserve team. After the end of the loan contract with Middlesbrough F.C. turned back to MFK Kosice on 1 July 2009. Gal-Andrezly two guest appearances for Shamrock Rovers in friendlies against Newcastle and Real Madrid in July 2009 at Tallaght Stadium and then had a trial spell with Charlton Athletic F.C.

== International career ==
Gál-Andrezly was a member of the Slovakia national under-19 football team and presented the team in the 2009 UEFA European Under-19 Football Championship qualification.

== Personal life ==
His father Daniel Gál-Andrezly was the head coach of MFK Spartak Medzev of the II. Slovenská Futbalová Liga.

== Career statistics ==
As of match played 31 October 2026

Appearances and goals by club, season and competition
Club	Season	League			National cup (Note: Includes Slovak Cup, Cupa României)		Europe		Other		Total	
Club	Season	Division	Apps	Goals	Apps	Goals	Apps	Goals	Apps	Goals	Apps	Goals
Košice	2009–10	Slovak Super Liga	1	0	0	0	—		—		1	0
Košice	2010–11	Slovak Super Liga	9	0	0	0	—		—		9	0
Košice	2011–12	Slovak Super Liga	5	0	1	0	—		—		6	0
Košice	2012–13	Slovak Super Liga	18	0	2	1	—		—		20	1
Košice	Total		33	0	3	1	—		—		36	1
Znojmo	2013–14	FNL	9	0	0	0	—		—		9	0
Šport Podbrezová	2014–15	Slovak Super Liga	24	2	0	0	—		—		24	2
Šport Podbrezová	2015–16	Slovak Super Liga	19	5	2	0	—		—		21	5
Šport Podbrezová	Total		43	7	2	0	—		—		45	7
Ružomberok	2015–16	Slovak Super Liga	13	0	2	0	—		—		15	0
Ružomberok	2016–17	Slovak Super Liga	32	5	3	0	—		—		35	5
Ružomberok	2017–18	Slovak Super Liga	29	5	7	2	6 (Note: Appearances in UEFA Europa League)	0	—		42	7
Ružomberok	2018–19	Slovak Super Liga	31	6	1	0	—		—		32	6
Ružomberok	2019–20	Slovak Super Liga	0	0	0	0	2	0	—		2	0
Ružomberok	Total		105	16	13	2	8	0	—		126	18
Sepsi OSK	2019–20	Liga I	22	2	1	0	—		—		23	2
Sepsi OSK	2020–21	Liga I	3	0	1	0	—		—		4	0
Sepsi OSK	Total		25	2	2	0	—		—		27	2
FK Csíkszereda	2021–22	Liga II	25	1	0	0	—		—		25	1
FK Csíkszereda	2022–23	Liga II	25	2	0	0	—		—		25	2
FK Csíkszereda	2023–24	Liga II	27	1	1	0	—		2 (Note: Appearances in Liga I promotion/relegation play-offs)	0	30	1
FK Csíkszereda	2024–25	Liga II	27	4	2	0	—		—		29	4
FK Csíkszereda	2025–26	Liga I	8	0	2	0	—		—		10	0
FK Csíkszereda	Total		112	8	5	0	—		2	0	119	8
Bihor Oradea	2025–26	Liga II	13	0	—		—		—		13	0
Bihor Oradea	2026–27	Liga II	4	0	1	0	—		—		5	0
Bihor Oradea	Total		17	0	1	0	—		—		18	0
Career total			344	33	26	3	8	0	2	0	380	36

== Honours ==
Ružomberok

- Slovak Cup runner-up: 2017–18

Sepsi OSK

- Cupa României runner-up: 2019–20
