= Kubilay Yilmaz =

Turkish footballer (born 1996)

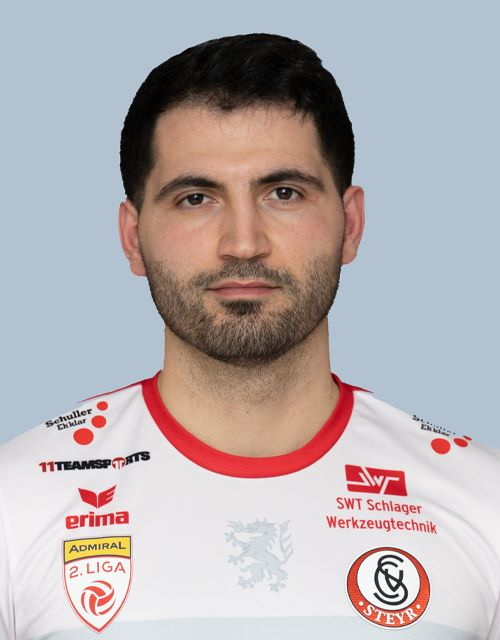

Personal information
- Full name: Kubilay Türk Yilmaz
- Date of birth: 9 July 1996 (age 30)
- Place of birth: Sakarya, Turkey
- Height: 1.84 m (6 ft 0 in)
- Position: Forward

Team information
- Current team: Isparta 32 SK

Youth career
- 2004–2012: Slovan Hütteldorfer
- 2012–2013: Rapid Wien
- 2014–2016: Znojmo

Senior career*
Years	Team	Apps	(Gls)
2011–2012	Slovan Hütteldorfer	13	(0)
2014–2016	Znojmo	9	(0)
2017–2019	Spartak Trnava	55	(15)
2020	Yeni Malatyaspor	0	(0)
2020	→ Boluspor (loan)	6	(1)
2020	Menemenspor	3	(0)
2021	Korona Kielce	5	(0)
2021	ViOn Zlaté Moravce	15	(0)
2022	Zemplín Michalovce	9	(1)
2023	SK Vorwärts Steyr	12	(3)
2023–2024	24 Erzincanspor	27	(6)
2024–2025	Isparta 32 SK	29	(8)
- * Club domestic league appearances and goals as of 26 October 2025

Kubilay Türk Yilmaz (born 9 July 1996) is a Turkish professional footballer who plays as a forward.

== Club career ==
=== Early career ===
As a youth player, he joined the youth academy of Rapid Wien.

=== Spartak Trnava ===
Yilmaz was signed by Spartak Trnava in January 2017. He made his professional Slovak league debut for Trnava against Zemplín Michalovce on 21 February 2017.

== Personal life ==
He was born in Turkey. His family moved to Vienna shortly after his birth. Yilmaz is a native speaker of Turkish and German and speaks Czech, Slovak and English fluently.

== Honours ==
Spartak Trnava

- Fortuna Liga: 2017–18
- Slovnaft Cup: 2018–19
