= Yves Pambou =

Footballer (born 1995)

Personal information
- Full name: Yves Simon Pambou Loembet
- Date of birth: 27 November 1995 (age 30)
- Place of birth: Montfermeil, France
- Height: 1.71 m (5 ft 7 in)
- Position: Midfielder

Team information
- Current team: Saumur
- Number: 23

Youth career
- Nantes

Senior career*
Years	Team	Apps	(Gls)
2013–2014	Reggina	20	(0)
2015	Trélissac	9	(0)
2015–2018	DAC Dunajská Streda	63	(1)
2018	Hapoel Petah Tikva	17	(0)
2019–2020	Grenoble	19	(0)
2020–2022	Gaz Metan Mediaș	23	(0)
2022–2023	Metalist Kharkiv	0	(0)
2024–	Saumur	7	(1)

International career^{‡}
2017–	Congo	2	(0)
- * Club domestic league appearances and goals as of 7 December 2024 ‡ National team caps and goals as of 12 November 2017

Yves Simon Pambou Loembet (born 27 November 1995) is a professional footballer who plays as a midfielder for Championnat National 1 club Saumur. Born in France, he plays for the Congo national team.

== Club career ==
After playing for FC Nantes' youth system, Pambou moved to Italy, joining Serie B side Reggina Calcio in July 2013.

After six months with Hapoel Petach Tikva, he signed a contract of one year and half with Grenoble Foot 38 in January 2019. He played for Gaz Metan Mediaș until the Romanian club was dissolved in 2022.

== International career ==
Pambou made his debut for the Congo national football team in a 1–1 2018 FIFA World Cup qualification tie against Ghana on 1 September 2017.
