= Boris Godál =

Slovak footballer (born 1987)

Personal information
- Full name: Boris Godál
- Date of birth: 27 May 1987 (age 39)
- Place of birth: Lúka, Czechoslovakia
- Height: 1.88 m (6 ft 2 in)
- Position: Centre-back

Team information
- Current team: Železiarne Podbrezová
- Number: 33

Youth career
- MŠK Lúka
- 2002–2006: AS Trenčín

Senior career*
Years	Team	Apps	(Gls)
2006–2012	AS Trenčín	136	(11)
2006–2007	→ Moravany nad Váhom (loan)		
2013–2015	Zagłębie Lubin	17	(1)
2013–2014	Zagłębie Lubin II	2	(0)
2015–2019	Spartak Trnava	88	(11)
2019–2020	AEL Limassol	18	(1)
2020–2023	Železiarne Podbrezová	51	(11)
2023	→ Al-Adalah (loan)	15	(2)
2023–2025	Dukla Banská Bystrica	38	(2)
2025	TJ Lovča	?	(:)

Managerial career
- 2026: Železiarne Podbrezová (assistant)
- 2026-: Železiarne Podbrezová (carateker)
- * Club domestic league appearances and goals as of 7 January 2026

Boris Godál (born 27 May 1987) is a Slovak professional footballer who plays as a centre-back for FK Železiarne Podbrezová.

== Club career ==
=== Early career ===
In February 2013, Godál joined Polish club Zagłębie Lubin on a two-and-a-half-year contract.

=== Spartak Trnava ===
Godál was transferred to Spartak Trnava in June 2015. He made his debut for Spartak in a 4–2 loss against Spartak Myjava. His first goal came in a 2–1 win against ViOn Zlaté Moravce, equalizing the game before Martin Mikovič would score the winning goal. Godál scored a double for Spartak in a 2–1 league win against AS Trenčín in the 2017/18 season. Later that season, he also scored the winning goal in a 2–0 win against DAC Dunajska Streda, which secured the league title for Spartak after 45 years. The next season, Godál helped his team qualify to the UEFA Europa League for the first time in the club’s history.

=== Later career ===
Later on he played for AEL Limassol, Železiarne Podbrezová and Al-Adalah.

In 2023, Godál signed for MFK Dukla Banská Bystrica. He made his debut for Dukla in a 3–0 away win in the league against Zemplín Michalovce, coming on off the bench in the 80th minute for Branislav Ľupták. He saw relegation to the 2. Liga with the club in 2025.

On 7 January 2026, it was announced that Godál would be returning to the first division, this time re-joining FK Železiarne Podbrezová.

== International career ==
In March 2013, Godál was included in the Slovak national team's wider squad for a qualifying match against Lithuania (March 22) and a friendly match against Sweden (March 26, both matches were held in Žilina at the Pod Dubňom stadium). He did not feature in either of the games.

== Honours ==
Zagłębie Lubin

- I liga: 2014–15

Spartak Trnava

- Fortuna Liga: 2017–18

AEL Limassol

- Cypriot Cup: 2018–19

Individual

- Fortuna Liga Player of the Season: 2017–18
