= FK POKROK SEZ Krompachy =

Slovak football club

- Full name: FK POKROK SEZ Krompachy
- Founded: 1913
- Ground: Football stadium Krompachy, Krompachy
- Capacity: 3000 (600 seats)
- Head coach: Ľuboš Ontko
- League: 3. Liga
- 2016–17: 2nd (East-North) (promoted)
- Website: http://fkpokrok.kromsat.sk/

FK POKROK SEZ Krompachy is a Slovak football team, based in the town of Krompachy.

== Colours ==
Club colours are black and white.
