= Patrik Macej =

Czech footballer

Personal information
- Full name: Patrik Macej
- Date of birth: 11 June 1994 (age 32)
- Place of birth: Ostrava, Czech Republic
- Height: 1.87 m (6 ft 2 in)
- Position: Goalkeeper

Team information
- Current team: Železiarne Podbrezová
- Number: 16

Youth career
- FC NH Classic Ostrava
- Baník Ostrava

Senior career*
Years	Team	Apps	(Gls)
2011–2013	Baník Ostrava B	7	(0)
2013–2014	Baník Ostrava	0	(0)
2015–2017	Zemplín Michalovce	22	(0)
2015	→ Slavoj Trebišov (loan)	13	(0)
2015–2016	→ Lokomotíva Košice (loan)	18	(0)
2017–2019	Dunajská Streda	34	(0)
2019–2020	Železiarne Podbrezová	16	(0)
2023–	Železiarne Podbrezová	0	(0)
Total		110	(0)

International career
2010	Czech Republic U16	1	(0)
2010–2011	Czech Republic U17	1	(0)
2011	Czech Republic U18	2	(0)
2017	Czech Republic U21	2	(0)
- * Club domestic league appearances and goals as of 15 October 2023

Patrik Macej (born 11 June 1994) is a former Czech football player who spent most of his career in clubs across Slovakia, playing as a goalkeeper. He had to retire at a young age of 25, due to continued back problems. In the summer of 2023, he returned to the field to play for Železiarne Podbrezová again.

== Career ==
Macej has played international football at under-16 level for Czech Republic U16, under-17 Czech Republic U17 and under-18 level for Czech Republic U18.

Macej made his Fortuna Liga debut for Zemplín Michalovce against AS Trenčín on 16 July 2016.
