= Marvin Egho =

Austrian footballer

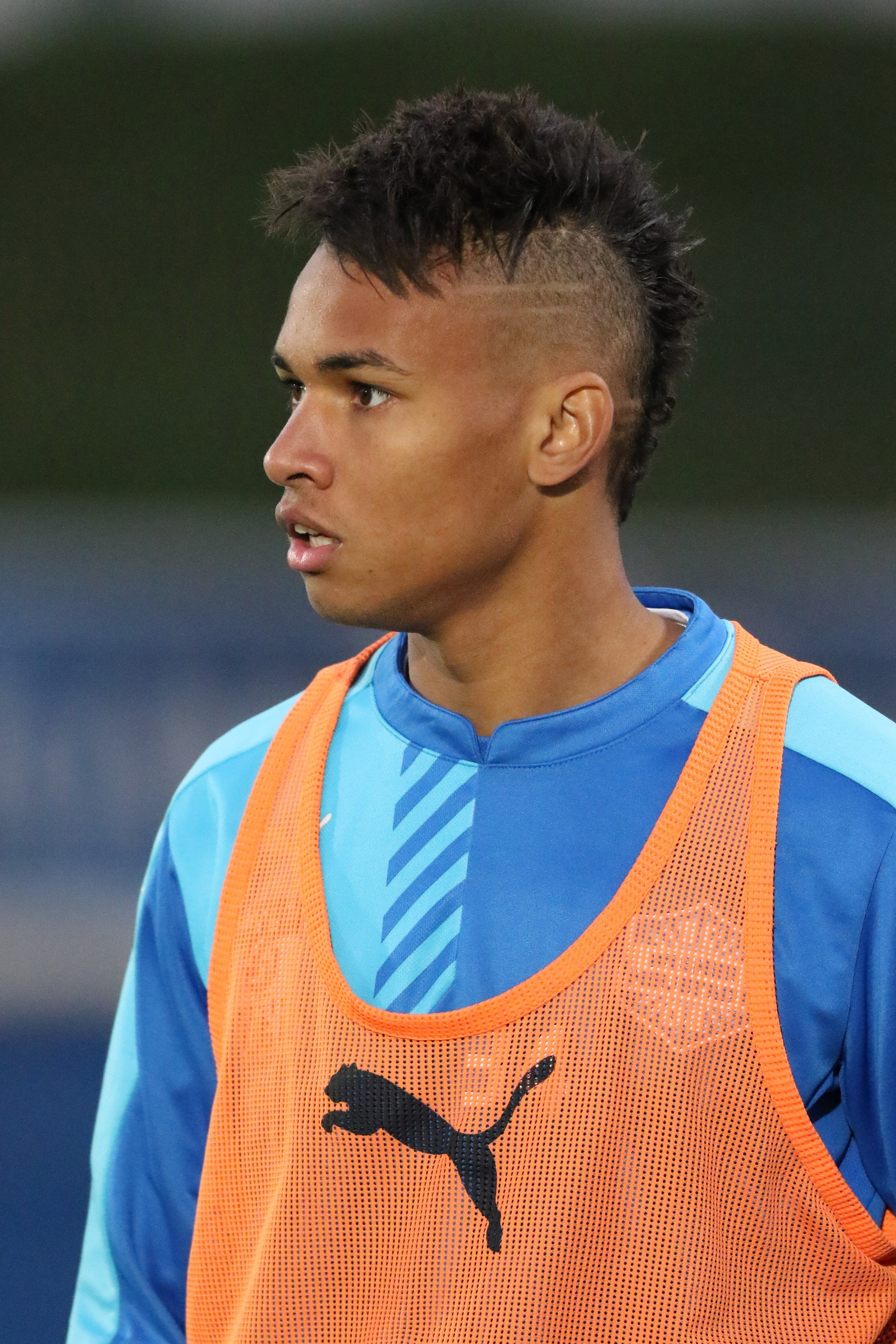
- Egho with Wiener Neustadt in 2016

Personal information
- Date of birth: 9 May 1994 (age 32)
- Place of birth: Vienna, Austria
- Height: 1.88 m (6 ft 2 in)
- Position: Forward

Team information
- Current team: Hvidovre
- Number: 45

Youth career
- 2002–2005: SV Donau Wien
- 2005–2008: FC Stadlau
- 2006: → SC Obersiebenbrunn (loan)
- 2008–2011: Wiener Neustadt
- 2009: → Austria Wien (loan)
- 2009–2010: → FC Stadlau (loan)

Senior career*
Years	Team	Apps	(Gls)
2011–2013	SR Donaufeld Wien	39	(11)
2013–2014	→ Rapid Wien II (loan)	24	(10)
2014–2016	Admira Wacker II	31	(13)
2014–2016	Admira Wacker	7	(0)
2016	→ Wiener Neustadt (loan)	14	(6)
2016–2017	Ried	10	(1)
2017–2018	Spartak Trnava	31	(7)
2018–2024	Randers	137	(27)
2024–2025	Horsens	14	(2)
2025–	Hvidovre	29	(6)

International career
2015	Austria U21	3	(0)
- * Club domestic league appearances and goals as of 2 June 2026

Marvin Egho (born 9 May 1994) is an Austrian professional footballer who plays as a forward for Danish 1st Division club Hvidovre IF.

== Club career ==
Egho started his career at SV Donau Wien. After playing at FC Stadlau, SC Obersiebenbrunn, SC Wiener Neustadt and FK Austria Wien, he went to SR Donaufeld Wien in 2011. In 2013, he moved to SK Rapid Wien, where he only played for the reserves. In 2014, Egho moved to Austrian Football Bundesliga club FC Admira Wacker Mödling. He made his Bundesliga and professional debut on the first matchday of the 2014–15 season against Wolfsberger AC. In January 2016, he returned to his youth club SC Wiener Neustadt on loan until the end of the season.

For the 2016–17 season he moved to SV Ried, where he signed a three-year contract.

After suffering from the Bundesliga with Ried, Egho moved to Slovak side Spartak Trnava for the 2017–18 season, where he signed a two-year contract. He scored the winning goal in a 2–0 win over Dunajská Streda, subsequently securing the title for Spartak.

In August 2018, Egho moved to Danish Superliga club Randers FC. After six years in Randers, it was confirmed on 9 April 2024 that Egho from the upcoming season moved to the Danish 1st Division club AC Horsens on a three-year contract. After not being part of the squad since March, Horsens confirmed on 22 May 2025 that the two parties had mutually agreed to terminate the contract early.

In July 2025, Egho joined Danish 1st Division club Hvidovre IF.

== International career ==
Born in Austria, Egho is of Nigerian descent. He made his Austria U21 debut as a substitute for Kevin Friesenbichler after 61 minutes of a 4–0 win over Qatar in a friendly on 28 March 2015.

== Honours ==
=== Club ===
Spartak Trnava

- Slovak Super Liga: 2017–18

Randers

- Danish Cup: 2020–21
