= Yasin Pehlivan =

Austrian footballer (born 1989)

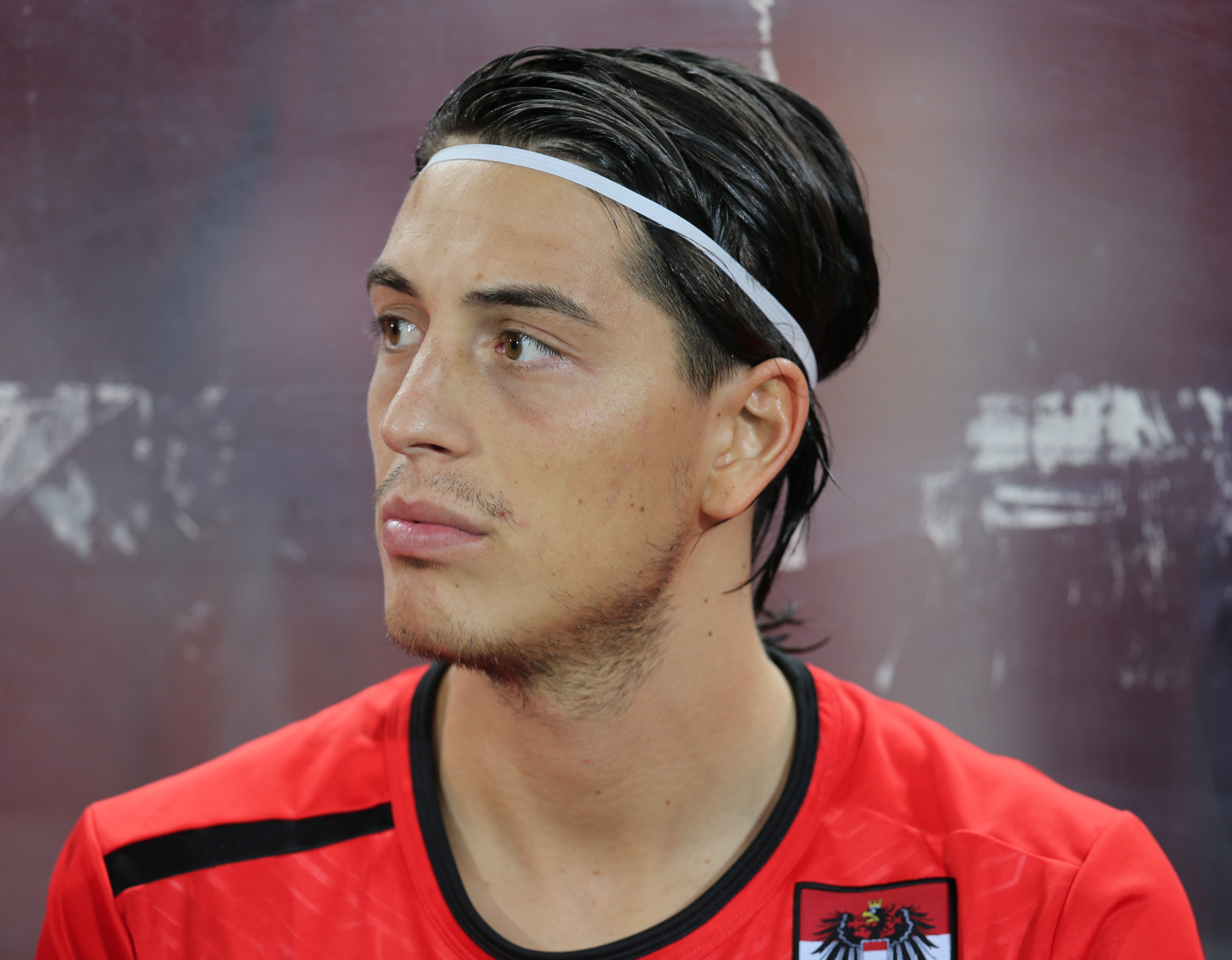
- Pehlivan with Austria (2012)

Personal information
- Date of birth: 5 January 1989 (age 37)
- Place of birth: Vienna, Austria
- Height: 1.84 m (6 ft 0 in)
- Position: Midfielder

Youth career
- 1998–2000: WS Ottakring
- 2000–2002: First Vienna FC
- 2002–2009: Rapid Wien

Senior career*
Years	Team	Apps	(Gls)
2009–2011	Rapid Wien	62	(3)
2011–2013	Gaziantepspor	34	(1)
2013–2015	Bursaspor	11	(0)
2015	Kayseri Erciyesspor	15	(0)
2015–2016	Red Bull Salzburg	16	(0)
2017–2018	Spartak Trnava	27	(1)
2018–2020	Gençlerbirliği	45	(2)
2020–2022	Çaykur Rizespor	28	(1)
2022	Manisa	10	(0)
2022	Sakaryaspor	7	(0)
2023	İskenderunspor	6	(0)

International career
2008	Austria U20	1	(0)
2009	Austria U21	3	(0)
2009–2012	Austria	17	(0)
- * Club domestic league appearances and goals as of 20 May 2023

Yasin Pehlivan (born 5 January 1989) is an Austrian professional footballer who plays as a midfielder. He is also part of the Austria national team. Since his debut in 2009, he was capped 17 times.

== Club career ==
Pehlivan began his career 1998 with Breitensee/Wat 16 (WS Ottakring) and signed in 2000 a loan deal with First Vienna FC. Than after two years turned back for a short stint and moved now on loan to SK Rapid Wien after two seasons with good performance for Rapid sold the club him.

His good performance brought him the call to the first team in January 2009 from SK Rapid Wien and made his debut on 22 February 2009 against Red Bull Salzburg, on 14 March 2009 scored his first goal against Kapfenberger SV.

He moved to Turkish Süper Lig side Gaziantepspor on 27 May 2011, signing a five-year contract.

At the end of the season, he signed a three-year contract with another Süper Lig side Bursaspor on 21 June 2013.

On 22 August 2015, Pehlivan signed for FC Red Bull Salzburg on a one-year deal.

== International career ==
Pehlivan received his first call-up for Austria in winter 2008–09 but only made his debut against Italy national under-21 football team on 11 February 2009. He played also his one and only game for Austria U-20 against Germany on 12 October 2008. He made two games in the Year 2009 for the Austria national team with new coach Didi Constantini.

== Personal life ==
Pehlivan was born to Turkish parents. He also holds Turkish citizenship.

== Honours ==
Red Bull Salzburg

- Austrian Bundesliga: 2015–16
- Austrian Cup: 2015–16

Spartak Trnava

- Slovak Super Liga: 2017–18
