= Moha Rharsalla =

Moroccan footballer

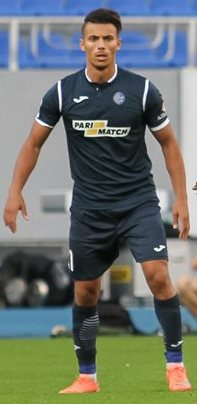

Personal information
- Full name: Mohammed Rharsalla Khadfi
- Date of birth: 15 September 1993 (age 33)
- Place of birth: Oujda, Morocco
- Height: 1.84 m (6 ft 0 in)
- Position: Winger

Team information
- Current team: Diósgyőr
- Number: 75

Youth career
- 2008–2010: Granada 74-Zaidín
- 2010–2012: Santa Fe

Senior career*
Years	Team	Apps	(Gls)
2012–2013	Huétor Tájar B	3	(0)
2012–2014	Huétor Tájar	39	(3)
2014–2017	Olimpik Donetsk	77	(12)
2016	→ Gimnàstic Tarragona (loan)	8	(1)
2018–2021	Slovan Bratislava	80	(28)
2021–2022	Al-Hazem	11	(3)
2022	Al-Qadsiah	17	(2)
2022	Hassania Agadir	3	(0)
2023	Gençlerbirliği	12	(1)
2024	FC Košice	3	(0)
2024–	Diósgyőr	10	(0)

International career^{‡}
2014	Morocco U23	1	(0)
2020	Morocco	1	(0)
- * Club domestic league appearances and goals as of 27 November 2024 ‡ National team caps and goals as of 13 October 2020

Mohammed "Moha" Rharsalla Khadfi (born 15 September 1993) is a Moroccan footballer who last played for Nemzeti Bajnokság club Diósgyőri VTK as a winger.

== Club career ==
=== Huétor Tájar ===
Born in Oujda, Morocco, Moha moved to Spain at his teens and spent his youth career at Club Granada 74-Zaidín and CD Santa Fe, graduating with the latter in 2012. In that year's summer he moved to Tercera División side CD Huétor Tájar, making his senior debut on 14 October by coming on as a substitute in a 0–2 home loss against CD El Palo.

Moha scored his first senior goal on 1 September 2013, netting the winner in a 2–1 home success over Loja CD. He scored three goals in 21 appearances during the first half of the campaign before departing to Ukraine in January 2014.

=== Olimpik Donetsk ===
In March 2014, Moha signed a five-year contract with Ukrainian First League club FC Olimpik Donetsk. He made his professional debut on 5 April, replacing Maksym Drachenko at the half-time of a 1–0 home win against FC Desna Chernihiv; he appeared in a further six matches during the season, as his side was crowned champions.

Moha made his Ukrainian Premier League debut on 15 August 2014, again from the bench in a 0–5 home loss against FC Shakhtar Donetsk. He scored his first professional goal on 18 October, netting his team's second in a 2–2 away draw against FC Metalurh Zaporizhya.

==== Gimnàstic (loan) ====
On 19 July 2016, Moha was included in Gimnàstic de Tarragona's pre-season camp. Two days later, the Catalans announced his signing, a one-year loan deal with a buyout clause.

Moha made his debut in the second level on 21 August 2016, starting in a 2–2 home draw against CD Lugo. He scored his first goal for the club seven days later, netting a last-minute equalizer in a 1–1 draw at SD Huesca.

On 26 October 2016, Moha was separated from the squad after the player "failed to fulfill his sporting obligations".

=== Slovan Bratislava ===
On 25 January 2018, Moha signed 4,5 year contract with Slovak Super Liga side Slovan Bratislava.

=== Saudi Arabia ===
On 10 July 2021, Moha joined Al-Hazem. On 28 January 2022, Moha joined Al-Qadsiah.

=== Hassania Agadir ===
On 25 August 2022, Moha joined Hassania Agadir.

=== Gençlerbirliği ===
On 27 December 2022, Rharsalla agreed to join TFF First League club Gençlerbirliği on a one-and-a-half-year deal.

== International career ==
In November 2014 Moha was called up for the Morocco national under-23 football team, and made his debut in a match against Egypt.

== Honours ==
Olimpik Donetsk

- Ukrainian First League: 2013–14

Slovan Bratislava

- Fortuna Liga (3): 2018–19, 2019–20, 2020–21
- Slovnaft Cup (3): 2017–18, 2019–20, 2020–21

Individual

- Slovak Super Liga Team of the Season: 2019-20
