= Roland Černák =

Slovak footballer (born 1997)

Personal information
- Full name: Roland Černák
- Date of birth: 22 July 1997 (age 29)
- Place of birth: Trebišov, Slovakia
- Height: 1.79 m (5 ft 10 in)
- Positions: Forward; winger

Team information
- Current team: FK v Nižnom Žipove

Youth career
- Slavoj Trebišov

Senior career*
Years	Team	Apps	(Gls)
2013–2014	Slavoj Trebišov	15	(3)
2014–2021	Dunajská Streda	45	(5)
2017	→ Tatran Prešov (loan)	16	(7)
2019–2020	→ Slavoj Trebišov (loan)	9	(1)
2020–2021	→ Humenné (loan)	13	(16)
2021–2022	Humenné	8	(2)
2022	→ Slavoj Trebišov (loan)	8	(1)
2022–2023	ŠK Slávia Lackovce		
2023–	FK v Nižnom Žipove		

International career
2014–2015	Slovakia U18	5	(0)
2015–2016	Slovakia U19	3	(0)
2017–2018	Slovakia U21	2	(0)
- * Club domestic league appearances and goals as of 30 July 2022

Roland Černák (born 22 July 1997) is a Slovak football forward who currently plays for FK v Nižnom Žipove.

Černák was considered a talented winger, however injuries plagued and shortened his career.

== Club career ==
At a young age, Černák was considered a talented prospect. During his time in the Trebišov academy, he mostly played ice hockey, but later decided to continue as a footballer.

=== Slavoj Trebišov ===
At the age of sixteen and 27 days, Černák made his senior debut for Slavoj Trebišov against Odeva Lipany on 18 August 2013. He netted 3 goals in 15 matches for Trebišov before his departure to FK DAC 1904 Dunajská Streda.

=== DAC Dunajská Streda ===
On 10 July 2014, Černák signed a three-year contract with DAC Dunajská Streda at the age of only 16 years old. He made his professional Fortuna Liga debut for FK DAC 1904 Dunajská Streda against MFK Ružomberok on 26 July 2014.

==== Loan to Tatran Prešov ====
In the summer transfer window of 2017, Černák signed with fellow league newcomers, Tatran Prešov. He made his debut for the club in a 5–1 defeat to ŠK Slovan Bratislava, playing the full match. Černák scored a brace in his next game, scoring in the 4th and 16th minute before being sent off in the 44th. Tatran would win the game 3–2. He continued his good form, scoring in all of the next three matches he played. Černák scored his 7th goal in a 1–1 draw against FC ViOn Zlaté Moravce, scoring in the 88th minute to secure a point for his team. After his loan with Prešov ended, Černák stated that he “would leave his future with Tatran Prešov open”.

=== Later career ===
On 1 February 2022, it was announced that Černák would be returning to Slavoj Trebišov on a half-a-year loan.

== International career ==
After consistently good performances with Tatran Prešov, Černák was noticed by the coach of the Slovak U21 national team, Pavel Hapal, and included him in the new team that played in the qualification for the 2019 European Championship.
