= Michal Jonec =

Slovak footballer

Personal information
- Full name: Michal Jonec
- Date of birth: 30 July 1996 (age 30)
- Place of birth: Košice, Slovakia
- Height: 1.85 m (6 ft 1 in)
- Position: Defender

Team information
- Current team: Slávia Košice
- Number: 23

Youth career
- Košice

Senior career*
Years	Team	Apps	(Gls)
2014–2015	Košice B	20	(0)
2015–2017	VSS Košice	38	(5)
2017–2020	Ružomberok	55	(2)
2020–2024	FC Košice	70	(3)
2024–	Slávia Košice	50	(8)

International career
2018	Slovakia U21	0	(0)
- * Club domestic league appearances and goals as of 25 May 2026

Michal Jonec (born 30 July 1996) is a Slovak footballer who plays as a defender for Slávia Košice.

== Club career ==
=== MFK Košice ===
Jonec made his Fortuna Liga debut for MFK Košice on 19 May 2015 against ŽP Šport Podbrezová in a 5:0 home victory. He replaced Milan Dimun 59 minutes into the game.
