= 2017–18 Slovak First Football League =

Fortuna Liga
- Season: 2017–18
- Dates: 22 July 2017 – 19 May 2018
- Champions: Spartak Trnava (1st title)
- Relegated: Prešov
- Champions League: Spartak Trnava
- Europa League: DAC Dunajská Streda; Slovan Bratislava; Trenčín
- Matches: 202
- Goals: 520 (2.57 per match)
- Top goalscorer: Samuel Mráz (21 goals)
- Biggest home win: Žilina 7–1 Senica (18 August 2017); Slovan 6–0 Žilina (24 February 2018)
- Biggest away win: Prešov 0–7 Trenčín (24 September 2017); Podbrezová 1–8 Trenčín (3 November 2017)
- Highest scoring: Podbrezová 1–8 Trenčín (3 November 2017)
- Highest attendance: 17,113 (Trnava-Trenčín)
- Lowest attendance: 106 (Nitra-Trnava)
- Average attendance: 2,317

The 2017–18 Slovak First Football League (known as the Slovak Fortuna Liga for sponsorship reasons) was the 25th season of first-tier football league in Slovakia, since its establishment in 1993. MŠK Žilina were the defending champions, after winning their 7th Slovak championship.

== Format changes ==
Starting from this season, the competition format was changed. The previous 33-match round robin structure was replaced by the current regular stage round of 22 games and a playoff round, where 12 teams are divided into two groups: championship group (top-6 teams after regular stage) and relegation group (bottom 6 teams). The playoff round uses a 10-game round robin structure.

The top team in the championship group wins the league title and qualifies to next season's Champions League qualification; the runner-up and 3rd team obtain spots of next season's Europa League Qualification. The bottom team of the relegation group will be relegated to next season's 2. Liga and replaced by the 2. Liga winner. The second-bottom ranked team will play a two-leg relegation playoff with the runner-up of 2. Liga.

Should one of the top 3 teams wins of the 2017-18 Slovak Cup, Europa League qualification playoffs will be held among the 4th, 5th, 6th team in the championship group and the top team of the relegation round. The 4th team plays the top team of the relegation group and the 5th plays the 6th in the semifinals. Winners of the semifinals will play the final to determine the Europa League qualification spot. Europa League qualification playoff games will be one-leg and played at the home pitch of the higher-ranked team.

== Teams ==
A total of 12 teams competed in the league, including 11 sides from the 2016–17 season and one promoted from the 2. liga.

Withdrawal of Spartak Myjava was confirmed on 21 December 2016. The withdrawn team was meant to be replaced initially by FC VSS Košice, but that team was rejected a promotion and went into bankruptcy. FC Nitra was promoted instead of Košice.

2017–18 Teams

- MŠK Žilina
- ŠK Slovan Bratislava
- MFK Ružomberok
- AS Trenčín
- FK Železiarne Podbrezová
- FC Spartak Trnava
- FC DAC 1904 Dunajská Streda
- FK Senica
- FC ViOn Zlaté Moravce
- MFK Zemplín Michalovce
- 1. FC Tatran Prešov
- FC Nitra

=== Stadiums and locations ===
Location of teams in Fortuna Liga 2017–18

Team	Home city	Stadium	Capacity	2016–17 season
AS Trenčín	Trenčín	Štadión na Sihoti	3,500	4th in Fortuna Liga
FK DAC 1904 Dunajská Streda	Dunajská Streda	MOL Aréna	9,901	7th in Fortuna Liga
FK Železiarne Podbrezová	Podbrezová	ZELPO Aréna	4,061	5th in Fortuna Liga
FK Senica	Senica	OMS Arena	5,070	9th in Fortuna Liga
MFK Zemplín Michalovce	Michalovce	Mestský futbalový štadión	4,440	8th in Fortuna Liga
MFK Ružomberok	Ružomberok	Štadión pod Čebraťom	4,817	3rd in Fortuna Liga
FC Nitra	Nitra	Stadium pod Zoborom	5,500	2nd in 2. Liga
1. FC Tatran Prešov	Prešov	NTC Poprad^{1}	5,700	11th in Fortuna Liga
MŠK Žilina	Žilina	Štadión pod Dubňom	11,258	Champions
ŠK Slovan Bratislava	Bratislava	Pasienky	12,000	2nd in Fortuna Liga
FC Spartak Trnava	Trnava	Stadium Antona Malatinského	19,200	6th in Fortuna Liga
FC ViOn Zlaté Moravce	Zlaté Moravce	FC ViOn Stadium	4,000	10th in Fortuna Liga

^{1}Tatran played their home matches in this season at NTC Poprad in Poprad while Tatran Stadium went under renovation.

AS Trenčín	Dunajská Streda	Podbrezová	Michalovce
Štadión na Sihoti	MOL Aréna; UEFA Stadium	ZELPO Aréna	Mestský futbalový štadión
Capacity: 3,500	Capacity: 9,901	Capacity: 4,061	Capacity: 4,440
FK Senica	MFK Ružomberok	MŠK Žilina	Slovan Bratislava
OMS Arena; UEFA Stadium	Štadión pod Čebraťom	Štadión pod Dubňom; UEFA Stadium	Pasienky
Capacity: 5,070	Capacity: 4,817	Capacity: 11,258	Capacity: 12,000
Spartak Trnava	Tatran Prešov	Zlaté Moravce	FC Nitra
ŠAM - City Arena; UEFA Stadium	NTC Poprad; UEFA Stadium	Štadión FC ViOn	Štadión pod Zoborom
Capacity: 19,200	Capacity: 5,700	Capacity: 4,000	Capacity: 5,500
	|		

== Personnel and kits ==
Team	President	Manager	Captain	Kitmaker	Shirt sponsor
AS Trenčín	(Netherlands) Tscheu La Ling	(Slovakia) Vladimír Cifranič	(Slovakia) Peter Kleščík	Adidas	MAGIC club
DAC Dunajská Streda	(Slovakia) Oszkár Világi	(Italy) Marco Rossi	(Croatia) Marin Ljubičić	macron	Kukkonia
FO ŽP Šport Podbrezová	(Slovakia) Július Kriváň	(Slovakia) Marek Fabuľa	(Slovakia) Miroslav Viazanko	Adidas	Železiarne Podbrezová
FK Senica	(Slovakia) Vladimír Levársky	(Netherlands) Ton Caanen	(Slovakia) Blažej Vaščák	hummel	-
MFK Ružomberok	(Slovakia) Milan Fiľo	(Slovakia) Norbert Hrnčár	(Slovakia) Dominik Kružliak	Adidas	MAESTRO
MŠK Žilina	(Slovakia) Jozef Antošík	(Slovakia) Adrián Guľa	(Slovakia) Michal Škvarka	Nike	Preto
Slovan Bratislava	(Slovakia) Ivan Kmotrík	(Slovakia) Martin Ševela	(Slovakia) Boris Sekulić	Adidas	-
FC Nitra	(Slovakia) Jozef Petráni	(Slovakia) Ivan Galád	(Slovakia) Miloš Šimončič	Jako	-
Spartak Trnava	(Slovakia) Dušan Keketi	(England) Nestor El Maestro	(Slovakia) Lukáš Greššák	Adidas	ŽOS Trnava
ViOn Zlaté Moravce	(Slovakia) Karol Škula	(Slovakia) Juraj Jarábek	(Slovakia) Martin Chren	Erreà	ViOn
MFK Michalovce	(Slovakia) Ján Sabol	(Slovakia) Anton Šoltis	(Slovakia) Igor Žofčák	Adidas	ISDB
1. FC Tatran Prešov	(Slovakia) Miroslav Remeta	(Czech Republic) Anton Mišovec	(Slovakia) Martin Luberda	ATAK Sportswear	Dúha

=== Managerial changes ===
Team	Outgoing manager	Manner of departure	Date of vacancy	Position in table	Replaced by	Date of appointment
Spartak Trnava	(Slovakia) Miroslav Karhan	End of contract	28 May 2017	Pre-season	(England) Nestor El Maestro	1 June 2017
DAC Dunajská Streda	(Romania) Csaba László	End of contract	9 June 2017	Pre-season	(Italy) Marco Rossi	11 June 2017
FK Senica	(Slovakia) Miroslav Mentel	End of contract	16 June 2017	Pre-season	(Slovakia) Ivan Vrabec	16 June 2017
FK Senica	(Slovakia) Ivan Vrabec	Released	11 September 2017	12	(Slovakia) Ladislav Hudec	11 September 2017
AS Trenčín	(Slovakia) Martin Ševela	Released	12 September 2017	10	(Slovakia) Vladimír Cifranič (Slovakia) Roman Marčok	12 September 2017
1. FC Tatran Prešov	(Slovakia) Miroslav Jantek	Released	14 September 2017	10	(Slovakia) Pavol Mlynár (interim)	24 September 2017
FK Železiarne Podbrezová	(Slovakia) Karol Praženica	Released	19 September 2017	11	(Slovakia) Marek Fabuľa	19 September 2017
1. FC Tatran Prešov	(Slovakia) Pavol Mlynár	End of interim spell	9 October 2017	11	(Ukraine) Serhiy Kovalets	9 October 2017
ŠK Slovan Bratislava	(Serbia) Ivan Vukomanović	Released	30 October 2017	3	(Slovakia) Martin Ševela	30 October 2017
1. FC Tatran Prešov	(Ukraine) Serhiy Kovalets	Released	24 January 2018	11	(Czech Republic) Anton Mišovec	24 January 2018
FK Senica	(Slovakia) Ladislav Hudec	Manager position	8 February 2018	12	(Netherlands) Ton Caanen	8 February 2018

== Regular stage ==
=== League table ===
Pos	Team	Pld	W	D	L	GF	GA	GD	Pts	Qualification
1	Spartak Trnava	22	16	2	4	34	16	+18	50	Qualification for the championship group
2	Slovan Bratislava	22	11	8	3	45	26	+19	41	Qualification for the championship group
3	DAC Dunajská Streda	22	10	9	3	29	20	+9	39	Qualification for the championship group
4	Žilina	22	12	1	9	42	35	+7	37	Qualification for the championship group
5	Trenčín	22	10	6	6	54	32	+22	36	Qualification for the championship group
6	Ružomberok	22	8	9	5	31	21	+10	33	Qualification for the championship group
7	Nitra	22	7	9	6	19	14	+5	30	Qualification for the relegation group
8	Zemplín Michalovce	22	6	6	10	18	25	−7	24	Qualification for the relegation group
9	Podbrezová	22	6	2	14	19	37	−18	20	Qualification for the relegation group
10	ViOn Zlaté Moravce	22	7	4	11	28	37	−9	25	Qualification for the relegation group
11	Senica	22	3	5	14	17	42	−25	14	Qualification for the relegation group
12	Tatran Prešov	22	3	5	14	13	44	−31	14	Qualification for the relegation group

Source: Niké liga (in Slovak)
Rules for classification: 1) Points; 2) Head-to-head points; 3) Head-to-head goal difference; 4) Head-to-head away goals scored; 5) Play-off.

=== Results ===
Each team plays home-and-away against every other team in the league, for a total of 22 matches played each.

Home \ Away	TRČ	DAC	POD	SEN	ZPM	RUŽ	ŽIL	SLO	NIT	TRV	TAT	ZTM
Trenčín	—	1–2	1–1	4–1	1–2	1–2	5–2	2–2	2–1	1–2	2–0	3–0
DAC Dunajská Streda	1–2	—	1–0	1–0	2–0	1–1	4–2	2–1	0–0	0–0	0–0	3–3
Podbrezová	1–8	0–2	—	1–0	1–0	1–3	2–4	1–1	1–0	1–2	2–0	3–0
Senica	1–2	0–2	1–0	—	1–1	0–3	4–1	1–1	0–1	1–3	1–0	0–1
Zemplín Michalovce	1–1	1–2	2–1	2–1	—	1–1	1–0	1–1	0–0	0–3	0–1	2–0
Ružomberok	3–3	1–1	3–0	4–0	2–1	—	1–0	0–1	0–0	0–2	3–1	1–1
Žilina	5–1	0–0	1–0	7–1	2–1	2–0	—	3–2	2–0	3–1	2–3	2–0
Slovan Bratislava	1–1	1–1	4–1	2–2	3–1	2–1	6–0	—	1–1	1–0	3–2	2–1
Nitra	1–1	3–1	1–0	0–0	0–0	0–0	1–0	0–1	—	0–1	2–0	1–0
Spartak Trnava	2–1	2–0	2–0	1–0	1–0	1–1	0–3	1–2	2–1	—	1–0	1–0
Tatran Prešov	0–7	0–0	0–2	2–2	1–0	0–0	0–1	1–5	0–4	0–2	—	1–1
ViOn Zlaté Moravce	1–4	2–3	1–0	3–0	0–1	2–1	2–0	3–2	2–2	1–4	4–1	—

Source: Niké liga (in Slovak)
Legend: Blue = home team win; Yellow = draw; Red = away team win.
For upcoming matches, an "a" indicates there is an article about the rivalry between the two participants.

== Championship group ==
Pos	Team	Pld	W	D	L	GF	GA	GD	Pts	Qualification	TRN	SLO	DAC	ŽIL	TRE	RUŽ
1	Spartak Trnava (C)	32	20	4	8	41	28	+13	64	Qualification for Champions League first qualifying round	—	1–0	2–0	0–0	0–2	1–0
2	Slovan Bratislava	32	17	8	7	58	37	+21	59	Qualification for Europa League first qualifying round	2–1	—	2–0	3–2	1–3	1–0
3	DAC Dunajská Streda	32	16	9	7	46	32	+14	57	Qualification for Europa League first qualifying round	1–0	0–1	—	3–1	0–3	3–0
4	Žilina	32	17	2	13	63	51	+12	53	Qualification for Europa League play-offs (Note: As the winners of 2017–18 Slovak Cup (Slovan Bratislava) finished in the top three of the league, the last Europa League spot awarded through the league (first qualifying round) will be decided by play-offs among the teams finishing fourth to seventh.)	6–0	2–0	2–3	—	1–5	3–0
5	Trenčín (O)	32	15	6	11	75	47	+28	51	Qualification for Europa League play-offs	1–2	1–3	1–3	1–2	—	3–1
6	Ružomberok	32	10	10	12	36	39	−3	40	Qualification for Europa League play-offs	0–0	1–0	0–4	1–2	2–1	—

Source: Niké liga (in Slovak)
Legend: Blue = home team win; Yellow = draw; Red = away team win.
Rules for classification: 1) Points; 2) Head-to-head points; 3) Head-to-head goal difference; 4) Head-to-head away goals scored; 5) Play-off.
(C) Champions; (O) Play-off winners

== Relegation group ==
Pos	Team	Pld	W	D	L	GF	GA	GD	Pts	Qualification or relegation	NIT	ZMI	POD	ZLM	SEN	TAT
7	Nitra	32	11	12	9	33	29	+4	45	Qualification for Europa League play-offs (Note: As the winners of 2017–18 Slovak Cup (ŠK Slovan Bratislava) finished in the top three of the league, the last Europa League spot awarded through the league (first qualifying round) will be decided by play-offs among the teams finishing fourth to seventh.)	—	1–3	0–0	1–0	5–2	3–2
8	Zemplín Michalovce	32	11	8	13	35	34	+1	41		4–0	—	1–0	2–0	1–2	0–0
9	Podbrezová	32	11	5	16	29	43	−14	38		1–0	2–1	—	1–0	3–1	1–1
10	ViOn Zlaté Moravce	32	8	7	17	39	52	−13	31		2–2	2–2	0–1	—	2–2	4–0
11	Senica (O)	32	6	8	18	29	58	−29	26	Qualification for relegation play-offs	0–1	0–2	1–0	3–1	—	0–0
12	Tatran Prešov (R)	32	5	11	16	22	56	−34	26	Relegation to 2. Liga	1–1	2–1	1–1	1–0	1–1	—

Source: Niké liga (in Slovak)
Legend: Blue = home team win; Yellow = draw; Red = away team win.
Rules for classification: 1) Points; 2) Head-to-head points; 3) Head-to-head goal difference; 4) Head-to-head away goals scored; 5) Play-off.
(O) Play-off winners; (R) Relegated

== Europa League play-offs ==
Teams placed between 4th and 7th position will take part in the Europa league play-offs. The best of them will play against the fourth-placed of the championship play-offs to determine the Europa League play-off winners. The winners will qualify for the first qualifying round of the 2018–19 UEFA Europa League.

All times are UTC+2.

=== Semi-finals ===
23 May 2018
17:30

MŠK Žilina	5–0	FC Nitra
Mráz 12', 22'; Holúbek 37', 46'; Káčer 55'	Report

Štadión pod Dubňom, Žilina
Attendance: 1,699
Referee: Peter Ziemba
23 May 2018
17:30

AS Trenčín	4–2	MFK Ružomberok
Beridze 22'; Lawrence 61'; Gong 72'; Čataković 82'	Report	Jonec 16' (pen.); Gál-Andrezly 28'

Štadión na Sihoti, Trenčín
Attendance: 1,554
Referee: Pavol Chmura

=== Final ===
27 May 2018
17:20 CEST

MŠK Žilina	1–2 (a.e.t.)	AS Trenčín
Kaša 65'	Report	Azango 36', 99'

Štadión pod Dubňom, Žilina
Attendance: 3,056
Referee: Jozef Pavlík

== Relegation play-offs ==
Team placed 11th in the relegation match will face 2nd team from 2. Liga 2017–18 to for two spots in the next season.

All times are UTC+2.

=== First leg ===
22 May 2018
17:20

MFK Skalica	2–1	FK Senica
Sombat 23'; Majerník 45'	Report	Chacón 10'

Mestský štadión Skalica, Skalica
Attendance: 2,137
Referee: Ivan Kružliak

=== Second leg ===
26 May 2018
17:20

FK Senica	1–0	MFK Skalica
Kitambala 69'	Report

Štadión FK Senica, Senica
Attendance: 1,752
Referee: Peter Ziemba

2–2 on aggregate. FK Senica won on away goal.

== Season statistics ==
=== Top goalscorers ===
As of 19 May 2018

Rank	Player	Club	Goals
1	(Slovakia) Samuel Mráz	Žilina	21^{a}
2	(Curaçao) Rangelo Janga	AS Trenčín	14
3	(Czech Republic) Jakub Mareš	ŠK Slovan	12
3	(Serbia) Aleksandar Čavrić	ŠK Slovan	12
5	(Slovakia) Róbert Gešnábel	Z.Moravce (9)/Ružomberok (2)	11
6	(Slovakia) Erik Pačinda	DAC D.Streda	10
6	(Croatia) Antonio Mance	AS Trenčín	10
8	(Slovakia) Filip Hološko	ŠK Slovan	8
8	(Nigeria) Hilary Gong	AS Trenčin	8
8	(Slovakia) Roland Černák	Prešov (7)/D.Streda (1)	8
8	(Slovakia) Martin Koscelník	Michalovce	8

^{a} Included 2 play-off goals

=== Hat-tricks ===
Round	Player	For	Against	Result	Date	Ref
1	(Czech Republic) Jakub Mareš	Slovan Bratislava	Tatran Prešov	1–5	23 July 2017	
21	(Serbia) Aleksandar Čavrić	Slovan Bratislava	MŠK Žilina	6–0	24 February 2018	
22	(Croatia) Antonio Mance	AS Trenčín	Zl. Moravce	1–4	3 March 2018	
30	(Colombia) Frank Castañeda	FK Senica	Zl. Moravce	3–1	5 May 2018	

=== Clean sheets ===
As of 19 May 2018

Rank	Player	Club	Clean sheets
1	(Slovakia) Lukáš Hroššo	FC Nitra	14
2	(Czech Republic) Patrik Macej	DAC D.Streda	13
3	(Slovakia) Martin Vantruba	Spartak Trnava	11
3	(Slovakia) Miloš Volešák	Žilina	11
5	(Slovakia) Martin Kuciak	Podbrezová	10
6	(Slovakia) Matúš Macík	MFK Ružomberok	8
7	(Slovakia) Matúš Kira	Michalovce	7
8	(Slovakia) Pavel Kováč	Zl. Moravce	5
8	(Slovakia) Michal Šulla	Slovan	5
8	(Slovakia) Igor Šemrinec	Trenčín	5

=== Discipline ===
As of 19 May 2018

==== Player ====
- Most yellow cards: 12
  - (Austria) Yasin Pehlivan (Trnava)
- Most red cards: 2
  - (Slovakia) Ján Krivák (Podbrezová)
  - (Slovakia) Damián Bariš (Zl.Moravce)

==== Club ====
- Most yellow cards: 75
  - FK Senica
- Most red cards: 7
  - FC ViOn Zlaté Moravce

== Awards ==
=== Player of the Month ===
Month	Player	Club	Ref
July/August	(Slovakia) Lukáš Hroššo	FC Nitra	
September	(Slovakia) Erik Jirka	Spartak Trnava	
October	(Slovakia) Samuel Mráz	MŠK Žilina	
Nov/Dec	(Slovakia) Erik Pačinda	Dunajská Streda	
Feb/Mar	(Austria) Marvin Egho	Spartak Trnava	
April	(Slovakia) Samuel Mráz	MŠK Žilina	
May	(Slovakia) Samuel Mráz	MŠK Žilina	

=== Top Eleven ===
- Goalkeeper: (Slovakia) Lukáš Hroššo (FC Nitra)
- Defence: (Panama) Erick Davis (DAC D.Streda), (Slovakia) Ľubomír Šatka (DAC D.Streda), (Slovakia) Boris Godál (Spartak Trnava), (Slovakia) Boris Sekulić (ŠK Slovan)
- Midfield: (Slovakia) Erik Pačinda (DAC D.Streda), (Croatia) Marin Ljubičić (DAC D.Streda), (Netherlands) Aschraf El Mahdioui (AS Trenčín), (Serbia) Aleksandar Čavrić (Slovan Bratislava)
- Attack: (Austria) Marvin Egho (Spartak Trnava), (Slovakia) Samuel Mráz (MŠK Žilina)

=== Top Eleven U-21 ===
- Goalkeeper: (Slovakia) Martin Vantruba (Spartak Trnava)
- Defence: (Slovakia) Matúš Kuník (FC Nitra), (Slovakia) Dávid Hancko (MŠK Žilina), (Slovakia) Richard Križan (FC Nitra), (Slovakia) Andrej Kadlec (Spartak Trnava)
- Midfield: (Netherlands) Aschraf El Mahdioui (AS Trenčín), (Slovakia) Miroslav Káčer (MŠK Žilina), (Slovakia) Erik Jirka (Spartak Trnava), (Brazil) Ewerton (Zl.Moravce), (Nigeria) Hilary Gong (AS Trenčín)
- Attack: (Slovakia) Samuel Mráz (MŠK Žilina)

=== Individual awards ===
Manager of the season

Nestor El Maestro (Spartak Trnava)

Player of the Year

Boris Godál (Spartak Trnava)

Young player of the Year

Samuel Mráz (MŠK Žilina)

== Attendances ==
#	Club	Average
1	DAC	6,918
2	Trnava	6,734
3	Žilina	3,136
4	Trenčín	1,848
5	Slovan	1,629
6	Nitra	1,608
7	Ružomberok	1,450
8	Zemplín	1,296
9	ViOn	1,185
10	Železiarne	944
11	Senica	767
12	Tatran	378

== See also ==
- 2017–18 Slovak Cup
- 2017–18 2. Liga (Slovakia)
- List of transfers summer 2017
- List of transfers winter 2017-18
- List of foreign players
