= 2020–21 FC DAC 1904 Dunajská Streda season =

FC DAC 1904 Dunajská Streda
2020–21 season
- President: Tibor Végh
- Manager: Bernd Storck (until 21 April 2021); Antal Németh
- Stadium: MOL Aréna
- Fortuna Liga: 2nd
- Slovak Cup: Quarter-final
- UEFA Europa League: Third qualifying round
Home colours

The 2020–21 FC DAC 1904 Dunajská Streda season was the club's 17th season in the Slovak Super Liga and 8th consecutive. DAC competed in the Fortuna Liga, UEFA Europa League and Slovak Cup. The season covered the period from 24 July 2020 to 15 May 2021.

For this season, the club has introduced a New Jersey to remind the 100th anniversary of the choice of the name DAC (Dunaszerdahelyi Atlétikai Club).

== Players ==
Note: Flags indicate national team as defined under FIFA eligibility rules; some limited exceptions apply. Players may hold more than one non-FIFA nationality.

No.	Pos.	Nation	Player
1	GK	SVK	Benjamín Száraz
2	DF	GER	Niklas Sommer
3	DF	UKR	Danylo Beskorovainyi
6	MF	CRO	Andrija Balić
8	MF	HUN	Máté Vida
9	FW	VEN	Eric Ramírez
11	MF	WAL	Isaac Christie-Davies (on loan from Barnsley)
13	MF	HUN	Zsolt Kalmár (Captain)
15	MF	USA	Creighton Braun
16	DF	BRA	Mateus Brunetti
17	FW	CGO	Yhoan Andzouana
18	DF	GER	Jannik Müller
19	MF	GAM	Sainey Njie
21	FW	GER	Brahim Moumou

No.	Pos.	Nation	Player
22	GK	HUN	Dániel Veszelinov
23	MF	GER	Sidney Friede
24	DF	SVK	Dominik Kružliak
25	FW	NGA	Abdulrahman Taiwo
26	MF	HUN	András Schäfer
27	DF	ARG	Luciano Vera
29	FW	CRO	Marko Divković
31	DF	PAN	Eric Davis
36	GK	CZE	Martin Jedlička
40	MF	SVK	Ferenc Bögi
77	MF	SVK	Sebastian Nebyla
82	DF	PAN	César Blackman
98	FW	MDA	Ion Nicolaescu

== Transfers and loans ==
=== Transfers in ===
Entry date	Position	No.	Player	From	Ref.
20 July 2020	DF	32	(Germany) Jannik Müller	(Germany) Dynamo Dresden	
23 July 2020	MF	23	(Germany) Sidney Friede	(Germany) SV Wehen Wiesbaden	
29 July 2020	MF	25	(Republic of the Congo) Yhoan Andzouana	(Belgium) KSV Roeselare	
4 August 2020	MF	77	(Slovakia) Sebastian Nebyla	(England) West Ham United "U18"	
7 August 2020	MF	6	(Croatia) Andrija Balić	(Italy) Udinese Calcio	
17 August 2020	GK	22	(Hungary) Dániel Veszelinov	(Hungary) Király SZE "U19"	
16 September 2020	FW	98	(Moldova) Ion Nicolaescu	(Belarus) FC Shakhtyor Soligorsk	
22 September 2020	DF	2	(Germany) Niklas Sommer	(Germany) SG Sonnenhof Großaspach	
13 November 2020	DF	27	(Argentina) Luciano Vera	(Argentina) Club Atlético River Plate	
19 January 2021	MF	40	(Hungary) Ferenc Bögi	DAC Academy	
21 January 2021	MF	15	(United States) Creighton Braun	(United States) West Coast FC	
27 January 2021	FW	21	(Germany) Brahim Moumou	(Slovakia) FC ŠTK 1914 Šamorín	
28 January 2021	DF	16	(Brazil) Mateus Brunetti	(Slovakia) Figueirense FC	

=== Loans in ===
Date	Position	Player	From	Ref.
29 January 2021	MF	(Wales) Isaac Christie-Davies	(England) Barnsley FC	

=== Transfers out ===
Date	Position	Player	To	Ref.
5 July 2020	DF	(Slovakia) Milan Šimčák	(Slovakia) FK Senica	
19 July 2020	GK	(Slovakia) Adrián Slančík	(Slovakia) FK Senica	
21 July 2020	MF	(Slovakia) Alex Javro	(Slovakia) MŠK Žilina "B"	
24 July 2020	DF	(Serbia) Dušan Lalatović	(Serbia) FK Partizan	
26 July 2020	DF	(Slovakia) Dominik Špiriak	(Slovakia) FK Pohronie	
5 October 2020	FW	(Hungary) Krisztián Németh	(United States) Columbus Crew SC	

=== Loans out ===
Date	Position	Player	To	Ref.
13 July 2020	FW	(Ghana) Ernest Boateng	(Slovakia) FC ŠTK 1914 Šamorín	
28 July 2020	MF	(Slovakia) Ladislav Nagy	(Slovakia) FC ŠTK 1914 Šamorín	
29 July 2020	FW	(Panama) Ricardo Phillips	(Slovakia) Zemplín Michalovce	
6 October 2020	MF	(Slovakia) Dominik Veselovský	(Slovakia) FC ŠTK 1914 Šamorín	
6 October 2020	MF	(Slovakia) Martin Bednár	(Slovakia) Zemplín Michalovce	
1 February 2021	FW	(Ghana) Zuberu Sharani	(Slovakia) Zemplín Michalovce	

== Friendlies ==
Win Draw Loss

=== Pre-season ===
25 July 2020	FC DAC 1904 Dunajská Streda (Slovakia)	2–1	(France) Olympique Marseille	Kufstein, Austria
16:00 CEST (UTC+02:00)	Ramírez 18'; Kalmár 33'	Report	Thauvin 53' (pen.)	Stadium: Kufstein Arena; Attendance: 0

1 August 2020	OGC Nice (France)	6–0	(Slovakia) FC DAC 1904 Dunajská Streda	Tirol, Austria
17:00 CEST (UTC+02:00)	Gouiri 1', 83'; Maolida 3', 45+1'; Maurice 34', 54'	Report		Stadium: Tivoli Stadion; Attendance: 0

=== Mid-season ===
16 January 2021	Vasas SC (Hungary)	1–2	(Slovakia) FC DAC 1904 Dunajská Streda	Budapest
13:00 CET	Radó 11'	Report	Balić 89'; Sharani 90'	Stadium: Vasas Sportkomplex

23 January 2021	FC DAC 1904 Dunajská Streda (Slovakia)	3–0	(Hungary) ETO FC Győr	Dunajská Streda
14:00 CET	Ramírez 50'; Balić 70'; Kalmár 72' (pen.)	Report		Stadium: MOL Academy

30 January 2021	FC DAC 1904 Dunajská Streda (Slovakia)	2–3	(Slovakia) FK Dubnica	Dunajská Streda
14:00 CET	Ramírez 28'; Sharani 102'	Report	Müller 33' (o.g.); Čurík 66'; Cyprian 103'	Stadium: MOL Academy
Note: played 4x30 minutes

6 February 2021	FC DAC 1904 Dunajská Streda (Slovakia)	0–0	(Slovakia) MFK Zemplín Michalovce	Dunajská Streda
13:00 CET		Report		Stadium: MOL Academy

== Competition overview ==
Competition	First match	Last match	Starting round	Final position	Record							
Competition	First match	Last match	Starting round	Final position	Pld	W	D	L	GF	GA	GD	Win %
Fortuna Liga	9 August 2020	22 May 2021	Matchday 1	Matchday 32	32	19	8	5	66	38	+28	59.38
Slovak Cup	30 September 2020	14 April 2021	2nd round	Quarter-final	3	2	0	1	12	4	+8	66.67
Europa League	27 August 2020	24 September 2020	1st qualifying round	3rd qualifying round	3	2	0	1	7	10	−3	66.67
Total					38	23	8	7	85	52	+33	60.53

Source: Competitions

== Fortuna Liga ==
=== Regular stage ===
==== Results summary ====
Overall								Home						Away					
Pld	W	D	L	GF	GA	GD	Pts	W	D	L	GF	GA	GD	W	D	L	GF	GA	GD
22	13	5	4	48	28	+20	44	7	3	1	27	10	+17	6	2	3	21	18	+3

==== League table ====
Pos	Team	Pld	W	D	L	GF	GA	GD	Pts	Qualification
1	Slovan Bratislava	22	17	3	2	54	12	+42	54	Qualification for the championship group
2	DAC Dunajská Streda	22	13	5	4	48	28	+20	44	Qualification for the championship group
3	Žilina	22	11	4	7	49	33	+16	37	Qualification for the championship group
4	Spartak Trnava	22	11	2	9	32	29	+3	35	Qualification for the championship group
5	Zlaté Moravce	22	9	6	7	38	29	+9	33	Qualification for the championship group
6	Trenčín	22	7	7	8	30	38	−8	28	Qualification for the championship group

Source: Niké liga (in Slovak)
Rules for classification: 1) Points; 2) Head-to-head points; 3) Head-to-head goal difference; 4) Head-to-head away goals scored; 5) Play-off.

==== Results by round ====
Round	1	2	3	4	5	6	7	8	9	10	11	12	13	14	15	16	17	18	19	20	21	22
Ground	H	A	H	H	A	H	A	H	A	A	H	A	H	A	A	H	A	H	A	H	H	A
Result	W	W	W	W	W	W	W	W	L	W	D	P	D	W	W	L	D	W	D	D	W	L
Position	1	2	1	1	1	1	1	1	1	1	1	1	2	2	2	2	2	2	2	2	2	2

Source: Futbalnet
A = Away; H = Home; W = Win; D = Draw; L = Loss; P = Postponed

==== Matches ====
9 August 2020 1	FC DAC 1904 Dunajská Streda	6–0	ŠKF Sereď	Dunajská Streda
18:00 CEST (UTC+02:00)	Ramírez 8'; Balić 12', 90+1'; Divković 13'; Davis 60'; Kalmár 63'	Report		Stadium: MOL Aréna; Attendance: 5,450; Referee: Peter Kráľovič

12 August 2020 2	FK Pohronie	1–2	FC DAC 1904 Dunajská Streda	Žiar nad Hronom
19:00 CEST (UTC+02:00)	Mazan 67'	Report	Balić 48'; Friede 90+3'	Stadium: Mestský štadión Attendance: 1,150; Referee: Pavel Ochotnický

15 August 2020 3	FC DAC 1904 Dunajská Streda	6–0	FC Nitra	Dunajská Streda
19:00 CEST (UTC+02:00)	Friede 42'; Davis 45+2' (pen.), 73'; Divković 56'; Kalmár 60' (pen.); Bednár 85'	Report		Stadium: MOL Aréna; Attendance: 5,831; Referee: Ivan Kružliak

22 August 2020 4	FC DAC 1904 Dunajská Streda	2–1	FC Spartak Trnava	Dunajská Streda
18:00 CEST (UTC+02:00)	Ramírez 26', 70'	Report	Pačinda 43'	Stadium: MOL Aréna; Attendance: 6,297; Referee: Michal Očenáš

30 August 2020 5	FC ViOn Zlaté Moravce	1–2	FC DAC 1904 Dunajská Streda	Zlaté Moravce
19:00 CEST (UTC+02:00)	24' (pen.) Hrnčár	Report	36' (pen.) Kalmár; 84' Divković	Stadium: Štadión FC ViOn; Attendance: 1903; Referee: Ivan Kružliak

12 September 2020 6	FC DAC 1904 Dunajská Streda	3–2	MFK Ružomberok	Dunajská Streda
19:00 CEST (UTC+02:00)	(red card) 36' Jannik Müller; 53', 59' Kalmár; 57' Ramírez	Report	20' Almási; 62' Kmeť; (yellow card) (yellow-red card) 90' Boďa	Stadium: MOL Aréna; Attendance: 819; Referee: Dušan Sedlák

19 September 2020 7	FK Senica	2–4	FC DAC 1904 Dunajská Streda	Senica
19:00 CEST (UTC+02:00)	44', 72' Malec; (red card) 79' Nemec	Report	21', 60' Kalmár; 64' Divković; 76' Ramírez	Stadium: OMS Arena; Attendance: 1000; Referee: Michal Očenáš

26 September 2020 8	FC DAC 1904 Dunajská Streda	3–1	AS Trenčín	Dunajská Streda
19:00 CEST (UTC+02:00)	30' Kalmár; 36', 62' Divković	Report	15' Roguljić; (penalty missed) 33' Čataković; (yellow card) (yellow-red card) 61' Zubairu	Stadium: MOL Aréna; Attendance: 1000; Referee: Michal Smolák

3 October 2020 9	MŠK Žilina	4–1	FC DAC 1904 Dunajská Streda	Žilina
19:00 CEST (UTC+02:00)	10' Iľko; 23' Kurminowski; 34' Bichakhchyan; 70' (o.g.) Kružliak	Report	33' Balic	Stadium: Štadión pod Dubňom; Attendance: 0 Referee: Peter Kráľovič

17 October 2020 10	MFK Zemplín Michalovce	2–4	FC DAC 1904 Dunajská Streda	Michalovce
17:00 CEST (UTC+02:00)	50' Trusa; 64' Pino	Report	15' Divković; 54' Friede; 83' (pen.) Kalmár; 90' Fábry	Stadium: Mestský futbalový štadión Attendance: 0 Referee: Boris Marhefka

25 October 2020 11	FC DAC 1904 Dunajská Streda	1–1	ŠK Slovan Bratislava	Dunajská Streda
16:00 CET (UTC+01:00)	34' Balić	Report	26' (o.g.) Kružliak	Stadium: MOL Aréna; Attendance: 0 Referee: Peter Kráľovič

7 November 2020 13	FC DAC 1904 Dunajská Streda	0–0	FK Pohronie	Dunajská Streda
17:00 CET (UTC+01:00)		Report		Stadium: MOL Aréna; Attendance: 0 Referee: Prešinský

21 November 2020 14	FC Nitra	0–1	FC DAC 1904 Dunajská Streda	Nitra
17:00 CET (UTC+01:00)		Report	50' Divković	Stadium: Štadión pod Zoborom; Attendance: 0 Referee: Martin Dohál

28 November 2020 15	FC Spartak Trnava	0–2	FC DAC 1904 Dunajská Streda	Trnava
16:15 CET (UTC+01:00)		Report	56' Ramírez; 60' Nicolaescu	Stadium: Štadión Antona Malatinského; Attendance: 0 Referee: Ivan Kružliak

2 December 2020 12	ŠKF Sereď	1–0	FC DAC 1904 Dunajská Streda	Zlaté Moravce
16:00 CET (UTC+01:00)	47' Morong; (red card) 69' Lačný	Report		Stadium: Štadión FC ViOn; Attendance: 0 Referee: Peter Ziemba

6 December 2020 16	FC DAC 1904 Dunajská Streda	1–3	FC ViOn Zlaté Moravce	Dunajská Streda
15:00 CET (UTC+01:00)	25' (pen.) Kalmár; (yellow card) (yellow-red card) 90+2' Blackman	Report	7' Hrnčár; 17' Kyziridis; 60' Ďubek	Stadium: MOL Aréna; Attendance: 0 Referee: Adam Somoláni

12 December 2020 17	MFK Ružomberok	1–1	FC DAC 1904 Dunajská Streda	Ružomberok
16:00 CET (UTC+01:00)	51' Kostadinov	Report	75' Ramírez	Stadium: Štadión pod Čebraťom; Attendance: 0 Referee: Peter Kráľovič

15 December 2020 18	FC DAC 1904 Dunajská Streda	2–0	FK Senica	Dunajská Streda
16:00 CET (UTC+01:00)	Kalmár 51'; Nicolaescu 72'	Report		Stadium: MOL Aréna; Attendance: 0 Referee: Michal Očenáš

14 February 2021 19	AS Trenčín	3–3	FC DAC 1904 Dunajská Streda	Trenčín
15:00 CET (UTC+01:00)	Kadák 26'; Demitra 29'; Čataković 70'	Report	Nicolaescu 56'; Kalmár 61' (pen.); Ramírez 90+3' (pen.)	Stadium: Štadión na Sihoti; Attendance: 0 Referee: Ivan Kružliak

21 February 2021 20	FC DAC 1904 Dunajská Streda	1–1	MŠK Žilina	Dunajská Streda
15:00 CET (UTC+01:00)	Nicolaescu 10'	Report	Jibril 47'	Stadium: MOL Aréna; Attendance: 0 Referee: Michal Smolák

27 February 2021 21	FC DAC 1904 Dunajská Streda	2–1	MFK Zemplín Michalovce	Dunajská Streda
14:00 CET (UTC+01:00)	Kružliak 10'; Andzouana 63'	Report	Žofčák 90+2' (pen.)	Stadium: MOL Aréna; Attendance: 0 Referee: Bálint Kišš

6 March 2021 22	ŠK Slovan Bratislava	3–1	FC DAC 1904 Dunajská Streda	Bratislava
14:30 CET (UTC+01:00)	Weiss 3', 11' (pen.)} Moha 57'	Report	Divković 32'	Stadium: Tehelné pole Attendance: 0 Referee: Peter Kráľovič

=== Championship group ===
==== Table ====
Pos	Team	Pld	W	D	L	GF	GA	GD	Pts	Qualification	SLO	DAC	TRN	ŽIL	ZLM	TRE
1	Slovan Bratislava (C)	32	22	5	5	78	28	+50	71	Qualification for the Champions League first qualifying round	—	0–1	1–2	2–2	4–1	2–1
2	DAC Dunajská Streda	32	19	8	5	66	38	+28	65	Qualification for the Europa Conference League second qualifying round	2–2	—	2–0	2–1	2–0	2–0
3	Spartak Trnava	32	17	4	11	48	37	+11	55	Qualification for the Europa Conference League first qualifying round	3–0	3–2	—	1–1	3–0	2–0
4	Žilina	32	15	7	10	73	52	+21	52	Qualification for the Europa Conference League play-offs	2–3	3–3	2–1	—	5–1	5–3
5	Zlaté Moravce	32	11	7	14	42	51	−9	40	Qualification for the Europa Conference League play-offs	0–4	0–1	0–0	1–0	—	1–0
6	Trenčín	32	8	8	16	42	61	−19	32	Qualification for the Europa Conference League play-offs	2–6	1–1	0–1	2–3	3–0	—

Source: Niké liga (in Slovak)
Rules for classification: 1) Points; 2) Head-to-head points; 3) Head-to-head goal difference; 4) Head-to-head away goals scored; 5) Play-off.
(C) Champions

==== Results summary ====
Overall								Home						Away					
Pld	W	D	L	GF	GA	GD	Pts	W	D	L	GF	GA	GD	W	D	L	GF	GA	GD
10	6	3	1	18	10	+8	21	4	1	0	10	3	+7	2	2	1	8	7	+1

==== Results by round ====
Round	1	2	3	4	5	6	7	8	9	10
Ground	H	A	A	H	H	A	H	A	A	H
Result	W	L	D	D	W	W	W	W	D	W
Position	2	2	2	2	2	2	2	2	2	2

Source: Futbalnet
A = Away; H = Home; W = Win; D = Draw; L = Loss; P = Postponed

==== Matches ====
13 March 2021 1	FC DAC 1904 Dunajská Streda	2–0	FC ViOn Zlaté Moravce	Dunajská Streda
17:00 CET (UTC+01:00)	Kalmár 74'; Ramírez 89'			Stadium: MOL Aréna; Attendance: 0 Referee: Marek Mastiš

21 March 2021 2	FC Spartak Trnava	3–2	FC DAC 1904 Dunajská Streda	Trnava
16:00 CET (UTC+01:00)	Cabral 49'; Yusuf 66'; Ristovski 90+3'	Report	Ramírez 45+1'; Taiwo 85'	Stadium: Štadión Antona Malatinského; Attendance: 0 Referee: Erik Gemzický

4 April 2021 3	MŠK Žilina	3–3	FC DAC 1904 Dunajská Streda	Žilina
16:00 CEST (UTC+02:00)	Ďuriš 30', 41'; Kurminowski 35' (pen.)	Report	Ramírez 22', 45+1'; Balić 33'	Stadium: Štadión pod Dubňom; Attendance: 0 Referee: Michal Smolák

11 April 2021 4	FC DAC 1904 Dunajská Streda	2–2	ŠK Slovan Bratislava	Dunajská Streda
16:00 CEST (UTC+02:00)	Ramírez 53' (pen.), 88'	Report	Holman 7' (pen.); Bajrić 77'	Stadium: MOL Aréna; Attendance: 0 Referee: Michal Očenáš

17 April 2021 5	FC DAC 1904 Dunajská Streda	2–0	AS Trenčín	Dunajská Streda
17:00 CEST (UTC+02:00)	Ramírez 8'; Divković 21'	Report		Stadium: MOL Aréna; Attendance: 0 Referee: Bálint Kišš

24 April 2021 6	FC ViOn Zlaté Moravce	0–1	FC DAC 1904 Dunajská Streda	Zlaté Moravce
14:30 CEST (UTC+02:00)		Report	Ramírez 50'	Stadium: Štadión FC ViOn; Attendance: 0 Referee: Michal Očenáš

1 May 2021 7	FC DAC 1904 Dunajská Streda	2–1	MŠK Žilina	Dunajská Streda
14:30 CEST (UTC+02:00)	Davis 16' (pen.); Taiwo 68'	Report	Paur 30'	Stadium: MOL Aréna; Attendance: 42; Referee: Michal Smolák

9 May 2021 8	ŠK Slovan Bratislava	0–1	FC DAC 1904 Dunajská Streda	Bratislava
18:00 CEST (UTC+02:00)		Report	Divković 77'	Stadium: Tehelné pole Attendance: 0 Referee: Michal Očenáš

15 May 2021 9	AS Trenčín	1–1	FC DAC 1904 Dunajská Streda	Trenčín
18:00 CEST (UTC+02:00)	Corryn 90+1'	Report	Beskorovainyi 58'	Stadium: Štadión na Sihoti; Attendance: 0 Referee: Michal Smolák

22 May 2021 10	FC DAC 1904 Dunajská Streda	2–0	FC Spartak Trnava	Dunajská Streda
19:00 CEST (UTC+02:00)	Divković 34'; Balić 54'; Davis (penalty missed) 60'	Report	Bukata (red card) 18'; Mikovič (yellow card) 30' (yellow-red card) 58'	Stadium: MOL Aréna; Attendance: 500; Referee: Peter Ziemba

== UEFA Europa League ==
27 August 2020 Q1	Fimleikafélag Hafnarfjarðar (Iceland)	0–2	(Slovakia) FC DAC 1904 Dunajská Streda	Hafnarfjörður, Iceland
19:15 (17:15 WET)		Report	22' Balić; 76' Ramírez	Stadium: Kaplakriki; Attendance: 0 Referee: Jason Barcelo (Gibraltar)

17 September 2020 Q2	FC DAC 1904 Dunajská Streda (Slovakia)	5–3 (a.e.t.)	(Czech Republic) FK Jablonec	Dunajská Streda, Slovakia
20:45	Divković 6', 65'; Nicolaescu 85', 96'; Davis 114'	Report	Zelený 26'; Schranz 57', 71' (pen.)	Stadium: MOL Aréna; Attendance: 0 Referee: Marco Di Bello (Italy)

24 September 2020 Q3	LASK Linz (Austria)	7–0	(Slovakia) FC DAC 1904 Dunajská Streda	Linz, Austria
20:30	Raguž 6', 16'; Filipović 47'; Michorl 51'; Gruber 53'; Balić 55'; Sabitzer 77'	Report	(red card) 48' Blackman	Stadium: Linzer Stadion; Attendance: 0 Referee: Jérôme Brisard (France)

== Slovak Cup ==
30 September 2020 2nd round	PFK Piešťany (5)	0–7	FC DAC 1904 Dunajská Streda	Piešťany
17:00 CEST (UTC+02:00)		Report	13' Nebyla; 20' Fábry; 38' Andzouana; 59' Nicolaescu; 62' Njie; 75' Veselovský; 83' Castillo	Attendance: 650; Referee: Martin Dohál
Note: The match was postponed on 17 August due to concerns over the coronavirus pandemic.

21 October 2020 3rd round	FC Pata (4)	Cancelled (Note: Due the COVID-19 pandemic organizers make changes in a format of the 2020–21 Slovak Cup. FC DAC 1904 Dunajská Streda promote to the Round of 16.)	FC DAC 1904 Dunajská Streda

7 April 2021 Round of 16	MFK Ružomberok (1)	1–3	FC DAC 1904 Dunajská Streda	Zvolen
16:00 CEST (UTC+02:00)	Regáli 87'	Report	Taiwo 34'; Divković 40'; Kružliak 66'	Referee: Boris Marhefka

14 April 2021 Quarter-final	MFK Dukla Banská Bystrica (2)	3–2	FC DAC 1904 Dunajská Streda	Zvolen
13:30 CEST (UTC+02:00)	Kupčík 2'; Frimmel 69'; Tóth 90+3'	Report	Müller 20'; Beskorovainyi 66'	Attendance: 0 Referee: Martin Dohál

== Statistics ==
=== Appearances and goals ===
No.	Pos	Nat	Player	Total		Fortuna Liga		Europa League		Slovak Cup	
No.	Pos	Nat	Player	Apps	Goals	Apps	Goals	Apps	Goals	Apps	Goals
Goalkeepers
1	GK	(Slovakia) SVK	Benjamín Száraz	3	0	1	0	0	0	2	0
36	GK	(Czech Republic) CZE	Martin Jedlička	35	0	31	0	3	0	1	0
Defenders
2	DF	(Germany) GER	Niklas Sommer	15	0	8+4	0	0	0	3	0
3	DF	(Ukraine) UKR	Danylo Beskorovainyi	23	2	16+2	1	0+2	0	3	1
18	DF	(Germany) GER	Jannik Müller	32	1	24+3	0	3	0	1+1	1
24	DF	(Slovakia) SVK	Dominik Kružliak	34	2	30	1	3	0	1	1
27	DF	(Argentina) ARG	Luciano Vera	1	0	0+1	0	0	0	0	0
31	DF	(Panama) PAN	Eric Davis	30	5	23+2	4	3	1	2	0
33	DF	(Slovakia) SVK	Matúš Malý	9	0	2+6	0	0	0	1	0
44	DF	(Panama) PAN	Jorge Méndez Castillo	6	1	1+4	0	0	0	1	1
82	DF	(Panama) PAN	César Blackman	31	0	26+1	0	3	0	0+1	0
Midfielders
6	MF	(Croatia) CRO	Andrija Balić	35	8	29+1	7	3	1	1+1	0
8	MF	(Hungary) HUN	Máté Vida	1	0	0+1	0	0	0	0	0
10	MF	(Slovakia) SVK	Andrej Fábry	17	2	6+7	1	2+1	0	1	1
11	MF	(Wales) WAL	Isaac Christie-Davies	13	0	8+1	0	3	0	1	0
13	MF	(Hungary) HUN	Zsolt Kalmár	26	13	23	13	3	0	0	0
19	MF	(The Gambia) GAM	Sainey Njie	22	1	7+11	0	0+1	0	1+2	1
20	MF	(Slovakia) SVK	Dominik Veselovský	1	1	0	0	0	0	0+1	1
23	MF	(Germany) GER	Sidney Friede	14	3	7+3	3	1	0	3	0
26	MF	(Hungary) HUN	András Schäfer	31	0	25+2	0	3	0	1	0
66	MF	(Slovakia) SVK	Martin Bednár	7	1	0+4	1	0+2	0	0+1	0
77	MF	(Slovakia) SVK	Sebastian Nebyla	14	1	9+3	0	0	0	2	1
Forwards
7	FW	(Ghana) GHA	Zuberu Sharani	6	0	0+5	0	0	0	1	0
9	FW	(Venezuela) VEN	Eric Ramírez	35	17	29+2	16	3	1	0+1	0
14	FW	(Slovakia) SVK	Jakub Švec	1	0	0	0	0	0	0+1	0
17	FW	(Republic of the Congo) CGO	Yhoan Andzouana	26	2	9+14	1	0	0	1+2	1
21	FW	(Germany) GER	Brahim Moumou	8	0	0+6	0	0	0	2	0
25	FW	(Nigeria) NGA	Abdulrahman Taiwo	13	3	4+7	3	0	0	1+1	0
29	FW	(Croatia) CRO	Marko Divković	37	15	29+3	12	3	2	2	1
98	FW	(Moldova) MDA	Ion Nicolaescu	27	7	6+16	4	0+2	2	2+1	1

=== Goalscorers ===
Rank	No.	Pos.	Name	Fortuna Liga	Slovak Cup	Europa League	Total
1	9	FW	(Venezuela) Eric Ramírez	16	0	1	17
2	29	FW	(Croatia) Marko Divković	12	1	2	15
3	13	MF	(Hungary) Zsolt Kalmár	13	0	0	13
4	6	MF	(Croatia) Andrija Balić	7	0	1	8
5	98	MF	(Moldova) Ion Nicolaescu	4	1	2	7
6	31	DF	(Panama) Eric Davis	4	0	1	5
7	23	MF	(Germany) Sidney Friede	3	0	0	3
7	25	FW	(Nigeria) Abdulrahman Taiwo	3	0	0	3
9	3	DF	(Ukraine) Danylo Beskorovainyi	1	1	0	2
9	10	MF	(Slovakia) Andrej Fábry	1	1	0	2
9	19	FW	(Republic of the Congo) Yhoan Andzouana	1	1	0	2
9	20	DF	(Slovakia) Dominik Kružliak	1	1	0	2
13	18	DF	(Germany) Jannik Müller	0	1	0	1
13	19	MF	(The Gambia) Sainey Njie	0	1	0	1
13	20	MF	(Slovakia) Dominik Veselovský	0	1	0	1
13	44	MF	(Slovakia) Jorge Méndez Castillo	0	1	0	1
13	66	MF	(Slovakia) Martin Bednár	1	0	0	1
13	77	MF	(Slovakia) Sebastian Nebyla	0	1	0	1
Own goals				2	0	0	2
Totals				65	12	7	84

=== Clean sheets ===
No.	Pos.	Name	Fortuna Liga	Slovak Cup	Europa League	Total
36	(Czech Republic)	Martin Jedlička	9		1	10
1	(Hungary)	Benjamín Száraz	1	1		2
Total			10	1	1	12

=== Disciplinary record ===
No.	Pos.	Nat.	Name	Fortuna Liga			Slovak Cup			Europa League			Total		
No.	Pos.	Nat.	Name	Booked	(yellow card) (red card)	Sent off (straight red)	Booked	(yellow card) (red card)	Sent off (straight red)	Booked	(yellow card) (red card)	Sent off (straight red)	Booked	(yellow card) (red card)	Sent off (straight red)
2	DF	(Germany)	Niklas Sommer	2	0	0	1	0	0				3	0	0
3	DF	(Ukraine)	Danylo Beskorovainyi	4	0	0							4	0	0
6	MF	(Croatia)	Andrija Balić	5	0	0							5	0	0
9	FW	(Venezuela)	Eric Ramírez	7	0	0	1	0	0	1	0	0	8	1	0
10	MF	(Slovakia)	Andrej Fábry							1	0	0	1	0	0
11	MF	(Wales)	Isaac Christie-Davies	1	0	0							1	0	0
13	MF	(Hungary)	Zsolt Kalmár	3	0	0				1	0	0	4	0	0
18	DF	(Germany)	Jannik Müller	5	0	1							5	0	1
19	MF	(The Gambia)	Sainey Njie	1	0	0	1	0	0				2	0	0
23	MF	(Germany)	Sidney Friede	1	0	0							1	0	0
24	DF	(Slovakia)	Dominik Kružliak	5	0	0				2	0	0	7	0	0
25	FW	(Nigeria)	Abdulrahman Taiwo	1	0	0							1	0	0
26	MF	(Hungary)	András Schäfer	5	0	0				1	0	0	6	0	0
29	FW	(Croatia)	Marko Divković							1	0	0	1	0	0
31	DF	(Panama)	Eric Davis	3	0	0	1	0	0				4	0	0
33	DF	(Slovakia)	Matúš Malý	4	0	0							4	0	0
36	GK	(Czech Republic)	Martin Jedlička	2	0	0							2	0	0
44	MF	(Panama)	Jorge Méndez Castillo	1	0	0							1	0	0
77	MF	(Slovakia)	Sebastian Nebyla	3	0	0							3	0	0
82	DF	(Panama)	César Blackman	4	1	0				0	0	1	4	1	1
98	FW	(Moldova)	Ion Nicolaescu	2	0	0							2	0	0
Total				59	1	1	4	0	0	7	0	1	70	1	2

== Awards ==
=== Fortuna Liga: Player of the Year ===
(Hungary) Zsolt Kalmár

=== Fortuna Liga: Player of the Month ===
Month	Player	Reference
August	(Hungary) Zsolt Kalmár	
February/March	(Venezuela) Eric Ramírez	

=== Fortuna Liga: Goal of the Month ===
Month	Player	Reference
August	(Venezuela) Eric Ramírez	
September	(Venezuela) Eric Ramírez	
October	(Croatia) Andrija Balić	
March	(Hungary) Zsolt Kalmár	
April	(Croatia) Andrija Balić	

=== Fortuna Liga: Top Eleven ===
- Defence: (Panama) César Blackman
- Midfield: (Hungary) Zsolt Kalmár
- Attack: (Venezuela) Eric Ramírez

=== Fortuna Liga: Top Eleven U21 ===
- Defence: (Panama) César Blackman
- Midfield: (Hungary) András Schäfer, (Croatia) Marko Divković
- Attack: (Venezuela) Eric Ramírez
