= 2022–23 FC DAC 1904 Dunajská Streda season =

FC DAC 1904 Dunajská Streda
2022–23 season
- President: (Hungary) Tibor Végh
- Manager: (Slovakia) Adrián Guľa
- Stadium: MOL Aréna
- Fortuna Liga: 2nd
- Slovak Cup: Fourth round
- UEFA Europa Conference League: Third qualifying round
- Top goalscorer: League: Nikola Krstović (15); All: Nikola Krstović (23)
Home colours
- All statistics correct as of 7 May 2023.

The 2022–23 FC DAC 1904 Dunajská Streda season is the club's 19th season in the Slovak Super Liga and 10th consecutive. DAC competed in the Fortuna Liga, Europa Conference League and Slovak Cup.

== Players ==
As of 29 March 2022

Note: Flags indicate national team as defined under FIFA eligibility rules; some limited exceptions apply. Players may hold more than one non-FIFA nationality.

No.	Pos.	Nation	Player
1	GK	(Portugal) POR	Ricardo Ferreira
5	DF	(Austria) AUT	Ahmet Muhamedbegović
6	MF	(Croatia) CRO	Andrija Balić
7	FW	(Ghana) GHA	Zuberu Sharani
8	MF	(Slovakia) SVK	Milan Dimun
9	FW	(Hungary) HUN	János Hahn
10	MF	(Portugal) POR	Andrezinho
11	FW	(Hungary) HUN	Norbert Balogh (on loan from (Hungary) Honvéd Budapest)
13	MF	(Hungary) HUN	Zsolt Kalmár (captain)
14	MF	(Latvia) LVA	Andrejs Cigaņiks
16	DF	(Brazil) BRA	Mateus Brunetti
17	FW	(Republic of the Congo) CGO	Yhoan Andzouana
18	FW	(Hungary) HUN	Ákos Szendrei
19	MF	(The Gambia) GAM	Sainey Njie

No.	Pos.	Nation	Player
20	MF	(Slovakia) SVK	Dominik Veselovský
21	FW	(Germany) GER	Brahim Moumou
22	GK	(Hungary) HUN	Dániel Veszelinov
23	FW	(Belgium) BEL	Thibaud Verlinden
24	DF	(Slovakia) SVK	Dominik Kružliak (vice-captain)
29	MF	(Slovakia) SVK	Ferenc Bögi
30	GK	(Slovakia) SVK	Attila Horváth
31	DF	(Panama) PAN	Eric Davis
33	DF	(Slovakia) SVK	Matúš Malý
45	FW	(Montenegro) MNE	Nikola Krstović
74	MF	(Hungary) HUN	Regő Szánthó (on loan from (Hungary) Ferencváros)
77	MF	(Slovakia) SVK	Sebastian Nebyla
78	DF	(Portugal) POR	Alex Pinto
82	DF	(Panama) PAN	César Blackman

== Transfers and loans ==
=== Transfers out ===
Date	Position	Player	To	Ref.
10 June 2022	GK	(Slovakia) Martin Vantruba	(Slovakia) FC Spartak Trnava	
25 June 2022	MF	(Slovakia) Andrej Fábry	(Slovakia) MFK Skalica	
30 June 2022	FW	(Belgium) Thibaud Verlinden	(Belgium) K Beerschot VA	
30 June 2022	DF	(Slovakia) Matúš Malý	(Slovakia) MFK Ružomberok	

=== Loans out ===
Date	Position	Player	To	Ref.
10 June 2022	DF	(Argentina) Luciano Vera	(Argentina) Deportivo Maipú	

== Friendlies ==
Win Draw Loss

=== Pre-season ===
18 June 2022	DAC Dunajská Streda (Slovakia)	3–1	(Slovakia) Pohronie	Dunajská Streda, Slovakia
11:00 CEST (UTC+02:00)	Kružliak 36'; Andzouana 56', 78' (pen.)	Report	Berisha 17'	Stadium: MOL Football Academy

22 June 2022	DAC Dunajská Streda (Slovakia)	v	(Slovakia) Slovan Bratislava	Dunajská Streda, Slovakia
CEST (UTC+02:00)				Stadium: MOL Football Academy

30 June 2022	DAC Dunajská Streda (Slovakia)	v	(Hungary) Peksi	Dunajská Streda, Slovakia
CEST (UTC+02:00)				Stadium: MOL Aréna

== Competition overview ==
Competition	First match	Last match	Starting round	Record							
Competition	First match	Last match	Starting round	Pld	W	D	L	GF	GA	GD	Win %
Fortuna Liga	July 2022		Matchday 1	0	0	0	0	0	0	+0	—
Slovak Cup				0	0	0	0	0	0	+0	—
UEFA Europa Conference League	7 July 2022		First qualifying round	0	0	0	0	0	0	+0	—
Total				0	0	0	0	0	0	+0	—

Source: Competitions

== Fortuna Liga ==
=== Regular stage ===
==== Results summary ====
Overall								Home						Away					
Pld	W	D	L	GF	GA	GD	Pts	W	D	L	GF	GA	GD	W	D	L	GF	GA	GD
18	11	5	2	33	15	+18	38	8	0	1	19	6	+13	3	5	1	14	9	+5

==== League table ====
Pos	Team	Pld	W	D	L	GF	GA	GD	Pts	Qualification
1	DAC Dunajská Streda	22	14	6	2	39	17	+22	48	Qualification for the championship group
2	Slovan Bratislava	22	14	5	3	47	23	+24	47	Qualification for the championship group
3	Spartak Trnava	22	12	4	6	39	26	+13	40	Qualification for the championship group
4	Podbrezová	22	9	8	5	32	24	+8	35	Qualification for the championship group
5	Žilina	22	9	4	9	34	33	+1	31	Qualification for the championship group
6	Dukla Banská Bystrica	22	9	4	9	34	37	−3	31	Qualification for the championship group

Source: Fortuna Liga (in Slovak)
Rules for classification: 1) Points; 2) Head-to-head points; 3) Head-to-head goal difference; 4) Head-to-head away goals scored; 5) Play-off.

==== Results by round ====
Round	1	2	3
Ground	H	A	H
Result			
Position			

Source: Futbalnet
W = Win; D = Draw; L = Loss

==== Matches ====
17 July 2022 1	DAC Dunajská Streda	2 – 1	Tatran Liptovský Mikuláš	Dunajská Streda
18:00 CEST (UTC+02:00)	Nije (yellow card) 37'; Krstović 71'; Kružliak 77'	Report	Gerát (yellow card) 42'; Káčerík 57'; Popović (yellow card) 90+4'	Stadium: MOL Aréna; Referee: (Slovakia) Peter Kralovic

23 July 2022 2	Žilina	1 – 1	DAC Dunajská Streda	Žilina
18:00 CEST (UTC+02:00)	Myslovič 13'; Kopas (yellow card) 61'; Gidi (red card) 87'	Report	Cigaņiks (yellow card) 45+3'; Krstović 77' (yellow card) 90+1'; Mateus Brunetti (yellow card) 87'; Veszelinov (yellow card) 90+3'	Stadium: Štadión pod Dubňom; Attendance: 2,158; Referee: (Slovakia) Ivan Kružliak

31 July 2022 3	DAC Dunajská Streda	3 – 0	ViOn Zlaté Moravce	Dunajská Streda
18:00 CEST (UTC+02:00)	Veselovský 9'; Krstović (yellow card) 71' (goal) 74'; Kalmár 80' (yellow card) 90+1'; Moumou (yellow card) 85'	Report	Pintér (yellow card) 33'; Niarchos (yellow card) 38'; Múdry (yellow card) 79'	Stadium: MOL Aréna; Attendance: 4,243; Referee: (Slovakia) Fillip Glova

7 August 2022 4	Podbrezová	0 – 0	DAC Dunajská Streda	Podbrezová
18:00 CEST (UTC+02:00)	Cobnan (yellow card) 43'; Godál (yellow card) 45'; Paraj (yellow card) 49'	Report	Njie (yellow card) 23'; Muhamedbegović (yellow card) 74'	Stadium: ZELPO Aréna; Attendance: 2,827; Referee: (Slovakia) Peter Kráľovič

14 August 2022 5	DAC Dunajská Streda	3 – 0	Dukla Banská Bystrica	Dunajská Streda
20:30 CEST (UTC+02:00)	Szánthó 45+2'; Ammar Ramadan 53'; Krstović 66'; Kružliak (yellow card) 88'	Report		Stadium: MOL Aréna; Attendance: 4,368; Referee: (Slovakia) Bálint Kišš

== UEFA Europa Conference League ==
=== First qualifying round ===
7 July 2022 First leg	DAC Dunajská Streda (Slovakia)	2 – 1	(Northern Ireland) Cliftonville	Dunajská Streda, Slovakia
20:30 CEST (UTC+02:00)	Szánthó 25'; Krstović 65'; Kružliak (yellow card) 82'; Moumou (red card) 82'	Report	Ronan Hale 28' (yellow card) 79'; Rory Hale (yellow card) 80'	Stadium: MOL Aréna; Attendance: 5,030; Referee: (Spain) Juan Martínez Munuera

14 July 2022 Second leg	Cliftonville (Northern Ireland)	0 – 3 (1 – 5 agg.)	(Slovakia) DAC Dunajská Streda	Belfast, Northern Ireland
20:45 CEST (UTC+01:00)	Fynn Talley (yellow card) 89'	Report	Veselovský 12'; Muhamedbegović (yellow card) 57'; Krstović 65' 90' (pen.); Hahn (yellow card) 66'	Stadium: Solitude; Attendance: 2,000; Referee: (Iceland) Þorvaldur Árnason

=== Second Qualifying Round ===
20 July 2022 First leg	(Faroe Islands) Víkingur	0 – 2	(Slovakia) DAC Dunajská Streda	Tórshavn
20:00 CEST (UTC+02:00)	Gregersen (yellow card) 88'	Report	Krstović 8'; Kružliak (yellow card) 16'; Moumou (yellow card) 18'; Blackman (yellow card) 73'; Cigaņiks 81'	Stadium: Tórsvøllur; Attendance: 610; Referee: (Slovenia) Nejc Kajtazović

28 July 2022 Second leg	(Slovakia) DAC Dunajská Streda	2 – 0 (4 – 0 agg.)	(Faroe Islands) Víkingur	Dunajská Streda
20:30 CEST (UTC+02:00)	Krstović 26'; Veselovský 34'; Blackman (yellow card) 45+1'; Balogh (yellow card) 88'	Report	Gregersen (yellow card) 45+1'; Bergur Gregersen (yellow card) 54'; Bardur Hansen (yellow card) 74'	Stadium: MOL Aréna; Attendance: 5,076; Referee: (Albania) Juxhin Xhaja

=== Thirds Qualifying Round ===
3 August 2022 First leg	(Slovakia) DAC Dunajská Streda	0 – 1	(Romania) FCSB	Dunajská Streda
20:30 CEST (UTC+02:00)	Risvanis (yellow card) 22'; Kružliak (yellow card) 56' (red card) 67'; Kalmár (yellow card) 90+6'	Report	Dawa (yellow card) 2'; Radunović (yellow card) 56'; Edjouma (yellow card) 62'; Tamm 69' (yellow card) 73'	Stadium: MOL Aréna; Attendance: 8,424; Referee: (Slovenia) Rade Obrenovič

11 August 2022 Second leg	(Romania) FCSB	1 – 0 (2 – 0 agg.)	(Slovakia) DAC Dunajská Streda	Bucharest
20:30 EEST (UTC+02:00)	Cordea 28'; Șut (yellow card) 86'	Report	Dimun (yellow card) 78'	Stadium: Arena Națională; Attendance: 40,457; Referee: (Azerbaijan) Aliyar Aghayev

== Slovak Cup ==
6 September 2022 Second Round	FK FILJO Ladomerská Vieska	2 - 4	Zulte Waregem	Ladomerská Vieska
15:30	Jaroslav Repiský 69'; Toma Macejko 90'	Report	Mateus Brunetti 28'; Ammar Ramadan 55'; Andzouana 74' 84'	Stadium: Športový areál Ladomerská Vieska; Attendance: 700; Referee: (Slovakia) Pavel Ochotnický

== Statistics ==
=== Appearances and goals ===
- Italics indicate a loaned player

No.	Pos	Nat	Player	Total		Fortuna Liga		Slovak Cup	
No.	Pos	Nat	Player	Apps	Goals	Apps	Goals	Apps	Goals
Goalkeepers
Defenders
Midfielders
Forwards

=== Goalscorers ===
Rank	No.	Pos.	Name	Fortuna Liga	Slovak Cup	Total
Totals						
