= Sainey Njie =

Gambian international footballer

Personal information
- Full name: Sainey Njie
- Date of birth: 30 August 2001 (age 25)
- Place of birth: Lamin, The Gambia
- Height: 1.82 m (6 ft 0 in)
- Position: Midfielder

Team information
- Current team: Doxa
- Number: 25

Youth career
- –2019: Gambinos Stars
- 2019–2020: DAC Dunajská Streda

Senior career*
Years	Team	Apps	(Gls)
2020−2023	DAC Dunajská Streda	39	(0)
2020−2021	→ Šamorín	12	(2)
2022–2023	→ Zemplín Michalovce (loan)	2	(0)
2023–2024	Radnik Surdulica	5	(0)
2024–	Doxa	15	(0)

International career^{‡}
2020–	Gambia	5	(0)
- * Club domestic league appearances and goals as of 26 June 2025 ‡ National team caps and goals as of 16 November 2023

Sainey Njie (born 30 August 2001) is a Gambian professional footballer who plays for Doxa in the Cypriot First Division as a midfielder, as well as the Gambian national team.

== Club career ==
Njie made his professional Fortuna Liga debut for DAC Dunajská Streda in an away match against Spartak Trnava on 21 June 2020. He came on as a late stoppage time replacement for Eric Ramírez. DAC won the game 2−0. In the upcoming match he debuted in the starting-line up against champion side of Slovan Bratislava, with DAC suffering a 3−1 defeat at MOL Aréna. Njie was replaced by Andrej Fábry after over 70 minutes, in an effort to score.

During the 2020−21 season, Njie played for Šamorín while also appearing for Dunajská Streda, as the 2. Liga club is a 'farm' team of DAC.

After 3 years in Slovakia, Sainley accepted a move to another country and signed with FK Radnik Surdulica, a club playing in the 2023–24 Serbian SuperLiga.

== International career ==
Njie debuted with Gambia in a friendly 1−0 win over Congo on 9 October 2020.
