= Nikola Krstović =

Montenegrin footballer (born 2000)

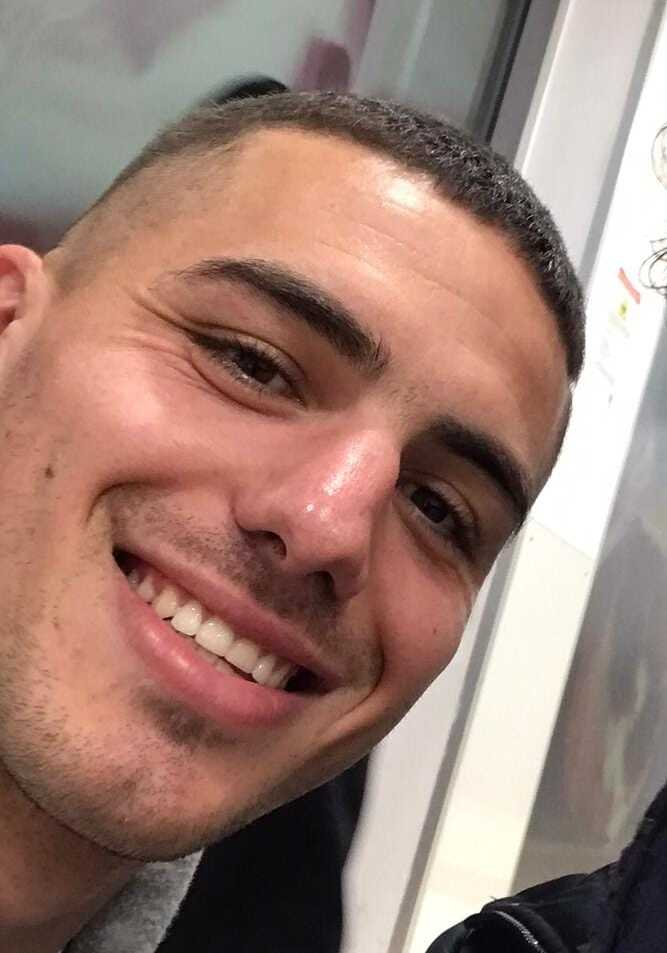
- Krstović in 2024

Personal information
- Date of birth: 5 April 2000 (age 26)
- Place of birth: Golubovci, Montenegro, FR Yugoslavia
- Height: 1.85 m (6 ft 1 in)
- Position: Striker

Team information
- Current team: Atalanta
- Number: 90

Youth career
- 2014–2017: Zeta

Senior career*
| Years | Team | Apps | (Gls) |
| 2016–2019 | Zeta | 92 | (37) |
| 2019–2021 | Red Star Belgrade | 21 | (2) |
| 2020 | → Grafičar Beograd (loan) | 6 | (2) |
| 2021–2023 | DAC Dunajská Streda | 56 | (29) |
| 2023–2025 | Lecce | 72 | (18) |
| 2025– | Atalanta | 44 | (17) |

International career^{‡}
| 2015–2017 | Montenegro U17 | 9 | (2) |
| 2017–2018 | Montenegro U19 | 5 | (0) |
| 2017–2022 | Montenegro U21 | 27 | (7) |
| 2022– | Montenegro | 40 | (13) |
- * Club domestic league appearances and goals as of 23:00, 8 November 2026 (UTC) ‡ National team caps and goals as of 15 November 2026

Nikola Krstović (Montenegrin Cyrillic: Никола Крстовић; born 5 April 2000) is a Montenegrin professional footballer who plays as a striker for Serie A club Atalanta and the Montenegro national team.

== Club career ==
=== FK Zeta ===
On 23 April 2016, Krstović made his competitive debut for Zeta, being assigned the number 13 jersey. He came on as a second-half substitute for Filip Kukuličić in their 1–1 league draw away against Iskra Danilovgrad, becoming the youngest player ever to appear in a 1. CFL game at the age of 16 years and 18 days old. Until the end of the 2015–16 Montenegrin First League, Krstović would go on to play in three more fixtures (all as a substitute) as the club hovered around the middle of the table.

On 5 November 2016, Krstović made his first appearance of the 2016–17 season, entering the field during the second half of a 1–0 home league win over Bokelj. He scored his first senior goals in March of the following year, netting a brace in a 3–0 away victory over Jedinstvo Bijelo Polje, making him the first player born in the 2000s to find the back of the net in the top flight of Montenegrin football. In his first full season at Zeta, Krstović played in 19 games (all in the league) and bagged seven goals.

On 29 June 2017, Krstović appeared as a starter for Zeta wearing the number 9 shirt in a 1–0 away loss to Željezničar Sarajevo in the first leg of the 2017–18 UEFA Europa League first qualifying round. He later scored an equalizer in the return tie a week later at home (the game ended in a 2–2 draw). In October of the same year, Krstović netted his first senior hat-trick and led his team to a 4–2 home win over Kom. He tallied 15 goals in 39 matches across all competitions throughout the season.

=== Red Star Belgrade ===
On 25 February 2019, Krstović signed with Serbian club Red Star Belgrade until the summer of 2023 with an option for another year. He remained on loan at Zeta until the end of the season, becoming the Montenegrin First League top scorer with 17 goals.

=== DAC 1904 Dunajská Streda ===
On 5 September 2021, DAC has announced the signing of Krstović on a four-year contract. DAC's sporting director Jan Van Daele claimed that DAC had scouted Krstović since his youth years in Montenegro. He was given the jersey number 45. Krstović claimed gladness and honour following the contract signing. In 2022–23 Fortuna Liga season, Krstović became the league's top scorer, scoring 18 goals in 27 appearances, up from 4 goals in 11 matches in the previous season.

=== Lecce ===
On 17 August 2023, Krstović signed for Serie A club Lecce. Ten days later, on 27 August, he scored a goal on his debut against Fiorentina, securing a 2–2 draw. Krstović also scored the opening goal at the Stadio Via del mare as Giallorossi beat Salernitana 2–0 and a goal in a draw against Monza (1–1), thus becoming the first Lecce player to score in his first three games with the club.

=== Atalanta ===
On 20 August 2025, Krstović moved to Atalanta and received squad number 90. He scored against his former team Lecce on 6th April 2026.

== International career ==
Krstović was capped for Montenegro at all youth levels from under-17 through to under-21. He made his debuts for the national under-21 team at the Valeriy Lobanovskyi Memorial Tournament in June 2017, appearing in both of his side's matches whilst scoring a brace in a 3–2 victory over Slovenia U21 in the third-place game. Later that year, Krstović netted a goal in a UEFA Under-21 Championship 2019 qualifier away to Bulgaria, as Montenegro suffered a 3–1 loss. On 28 March 2022, he made his senior debut in a home friendly match against Greece. Krstović scored his first international goal in his fourth appearance on 24 March 2023, to give Montenegro a 1–0 win away at Bulgaria in a 2024 European Championship qualifying match.

== Career statistics ==
=== Club ===
As of match played 8 November 2026

Appearances and goals by club, season and competition
| Club | Season | League | | | National cup (Note: Includes Montenegrin Cup, Serbian Cup, Slovak Cup, Coppa Italia) | | Europe | | Total | |
| Club | Season | Division | Apps | Goals | Apps | Goals | Apps | Goals | Apps | Goals |
|---|---|---|---|---|---|---|---|---|---|---|
| Zeta | 2015–16 | 1. CFL | 4 | 0 | 0 | 0 | — | | 4 | 0 |
| Zeta | 2016–17 | 1. CFL | 19 | 7 | 0 | 0 | — | | 19 | 7 |
| Zeta | 2017–18 | 1. CFL | 36 | 13 | 1 | 1 | 2 | 1 | 39 | 15 |
| Zeta | 2018–19 | 1. CFL | 33 | 17 | 4 | 2 | — | | 37 | 19 |
| Zeta | Total | | 92 | 37 | 5 | 3 | 2 | 1 | 99 | 41 |
| Red Star Belgrade | 2019–20 | Serbian SuperLiga | 6 | 0 | 0 | 0 | 0 | 0 | 6 | 0 |
| Red Star Belgrade | 2020–21 | Serbian SuperLiga | 11 | 1 | 2 | 1 | 0 | 0 | 13 | 2 |
| Red Star Belgrade | 2021–22 | Serbian SuperLiga | 4 | 1 | 0 | 0 | 4 (Note: Three appearances in UEFA Champions League, one appearance in UEFA Europa League) | 0 | 8 | 1 |
| Red Star Belgrade | Total | | 21 | 2 | 2 | 1 | 4 | 0 | 27 | 3 |
| Grafičar Beograd (loan) | 2019–20 | Serbian First League | 6 | 2 | 0 | 0 | — | | 6 | 2 |
| DAC 1904 | 2021–22 | Slovak Super Liga | 26 | 9 | 0 | 0 | — | | 26 | 9 |
| DAC 1904 | 2022–23 | Slovak Super Liga | 27 | 18 | 2 | 3 | 6 (Note: Appearances in UEFA Europa Conference League) | 5 | 35 | 26 |
| DAC 1904 | 2023–24 | Slovak Super Liga | 3 | 2 | 0 | 0 | 2 | 0 | 5 | 2 |
| DAC 1904 | Total | | 56 | 29 | 2 | 3 | 8 | 5 | 66 | 37 |
| Lecce | 2023–24 | Serie A | 35 | 7 | 1 | 0 | — | | 36 | 7 |
| Lecce | 2024–25 | Serie A | 37 | 11 | 1 | 1 | — | | 38 | 12 |
| Lecce | 2025–26 | Serie A | — | | 1 | 1 | — | | 1 | 1 |
| Lecce | Total | | 72 | 18 | 3 | 2 | 0 | 0 | 75 | 20 |
| Atalanta | 2025–26 | Serie A | 33 | 10 | 3 | 0 | 12 (Note: Appearances in UEFA Champions League) | 1 | 48 | 11 |
| Atalanta | 2026–27 | Serie A | 11 | 7 | 0 | 0 | 4 (Note: Appearances in UEFA Conference League) | 1 | 15 | 8 |
| Atalanta | Total | | 44 | 17 | 3 | 0 | 16 | 2 | 63 | 19 |
| Career total | | | 292 | 103 | 15 | 9 | 30 | 8 | 337 | 120 |

=== International ===
As of match played 15 November 2026

Appearances and goals by national team and year
| National team | Year | Apps | Goals |
|---|---|---|---|
| Montenegro | 2022 | 5 | 0 |
| Montenegro | 2023 | 9 | 2 |
| Montenegro | 2024 | 10 | 4 |
| Montenegro | 2025 | 9 | 2 |
| Montenegro | 2026 | 7 | 5 |
| Total | | 40 | 13 |

Scores and results list Montenegro's goal tally first, score column indicates score after each Krstović goal.

List of international goals scored by Nikola Krstović
| No. | Date | Venue | Opponent | Score | Result | Competition |
|---|---|---|---|---|---|---|
| 1 | 25 March 2023 | Huvepharma Arena, Razgrad, Bulgaria | Bulgaria | 1–0 | 1–0 | UEFA Euro 2024 qualifying |
| 2 | 7 September 2023 | Darius and Girėnas Stadium, Kaunas, Lithuania | Lithuania | 1–1 | 2–2 | UEFA Euro 2024 qualifying |
| 3 | 21 March 2024 | Mardan Sports Complex, Aksu, Turkey | Belarus | 2–0 | 2–0 | Friendly |
| 4 | 19 November 2024 | Gradski stadion, Nikšić, Montenegro | Turkey | 1–0 | 3–1 | 2024–25 UEFA Nations League B |
| 5 | 19 November 2024 | Gradski stadion, Nikšić, Montenegro | Turkey | 2–1 | 3–1 | 2024–25 UEFA Nations League B |
| 6 | 19 November 2024 | Gradski stadion, Nikšić, Montenegro | Turkey | 3–1 | 3–1 | 2024–25 UEFA Nations League B |
| 7 | 14 November 2025 | Europa Sports Park, Gibraltar | Gibraltar | 2–1 | 2–1 | 2026 FIFA World Cup qualification |
| 8 | 18 November 2025 | Podgorica City Stadium, Podgorica, Montenegro | Croatia | 2–0 | 2–3 | 2026 FIFA World Cup qualification |
| 9 | 25 September 2026 | Podgorica City Stadium, Podgorica, Montenegro | Cyprus | 1–1 | 2–1 | 2026–27 UEFA Nations League C |
| 10 | 28 September 2026 | Vazgen Sargsyan Republican Stadium, Yerevan, Armenia | Armenia | 2–1 | 3–2 | 2026–27 UEFA Nations League C |
| 11 | 12 November 2026 | Podgorica City Stadium, Podgorica, Montenegro | Latvia | 1–0 | 2–1 | 2026–27 UEFA Nations League C |
| 12 | 15 November 2026 | Alphamega Stadium Limassol, Cyprus | Cyprus | 3–1 | 4–1 | 2026–27 UEFA Nations League C |
| 13 | 15 November 2026 | Alphamega Stadium Limassol, Cyprus | Cyprus | 4–1 | 4–1 | 2026–27 UEFA Nations League C |

== Honours ==
Red Star Belgrade

- Serbian SuperLiga: 2020–21
- Serbian Cup: 2020–21

Individual

- Slovak Super Liga Player of the Month: May 2022, July 2022, October 2022, March 2023
- Slovak Super Liga Goal of the Month: May 2022, July 2022
- Slovak Super Liga Top Score: 2022–23
- Slovak Super Liga Team of the Season: 2022–23
- Montenegrin Footballer of the Year: 2024
