= Matúš Malý =

Slovak under-21 international footballer

Personal information
- Full name: Matúš Malý
- Date of birth: 11 July 2001 (age 25)
- Place of birth: Dunajská Streda, Slovakia
- Height: 1.93 m (6 ft 4 in)
- Position: Defender

Team information
- Current team: Sigma Olomouc
- Number: 33

Youth career
- 2008–2019: DAC Dunajská Streda

Senior career*
Years	Team	Apps	(Gls)
2019−2022	DAC Dunajská Streda	15	(0)
2019–2022	→ Šamorín (loan)	34	(2)
2021	→ Senica (loan)	1	(0)
2022−2025	Ružomberok	84	(3)
2025−	Sigma Olomouc	10	(0)
2025−	Sigma Olomouc B	5	(0)

International career^{‡}
2018	Slovakia U17	1	(0)
2019	Slovakia U18	1	(0)
2019	Slovakia U19	4	(0)
2021–	Slovakia U21	3	(0)
- * Club domestic league appearances and goals as of 27 May 2026 ‡ National team caps and goals as of 14:41, 8 June 2022 (UTC)

Matúš Malý (born 11 July 2001) is a Slovak footballer who plays for Sigma Olomouc as a defender.

== Club career ==
=== DAC Dunajská Streda ===
As an alumnus of DAC Dunajská Streda's academy, Malý made his Fortuna Liga debut for DAC in MOL Aréna, in a derby match against Slovan Bratislava on 1 July 2020. He came on to the pitch in the first half as a replacement for Martin Bednár, who suffered an injury. Dunajská Streda lost the game against the 2019–20 season's champions 1:3. After an impressive performance, he completed the full length of two final games of the season against Žilina and Ružomberok, during which DAC did not concede a single goal.

=== MFK Ružomberok ===
In mid-June 2022, Malý signed a three-year contract with Ružomberok.

=== Sigma Olomouc ===
In mid-July 2025, Malý signed a two-year contract with Czech club Sigma Olomouc.
