= Ferenc Bögi =

Slovak footballer

Personal information
- Date of birth: 11 April 2002 (age 24)
- Position: Midfielder

Team information
- Current team: Komárno
- Number: 20

Youth career
- 2007–2022: DAC Dunajská Streda
- 2021: → ŠTK Šamorín

Senior career*
Years	Team	Apps	(Gls)
2020–2022	DAC Dunajská Streda	2	(0)
2020–2023	→ ŠTK Šamorín	40	(2)
2023–	Komárno	6	(0)

International career^{‡}
- Slovakia U19
- * Club domestic league appearances and goals as of 2 April 2024 ‡ National team caps and goals as of 17 March 2021

Ferenc Bögi (born 11 April 2002) is a Slovak professional footballer who plays as a midfielder for 2. Liga Liga club Komárno.

== Club career ==
=== DAC Dunajská Streda ===
Bögi made his Fortuna Liga debut for DAC Dunajská Streda on 13 March 2022 in a regional derby match against Spartak Trnava at MOL Aréna. After 78 minutes of play, he replaced Sebastian Nebyla, with DAC in a 1–0 lead, following a first half strike by Norbert Balogh. However, in stoppage time Macedonian international Milan Ristovski had scored equalising the final result at 1-1.
