= Niklas Sommer =

German footballer

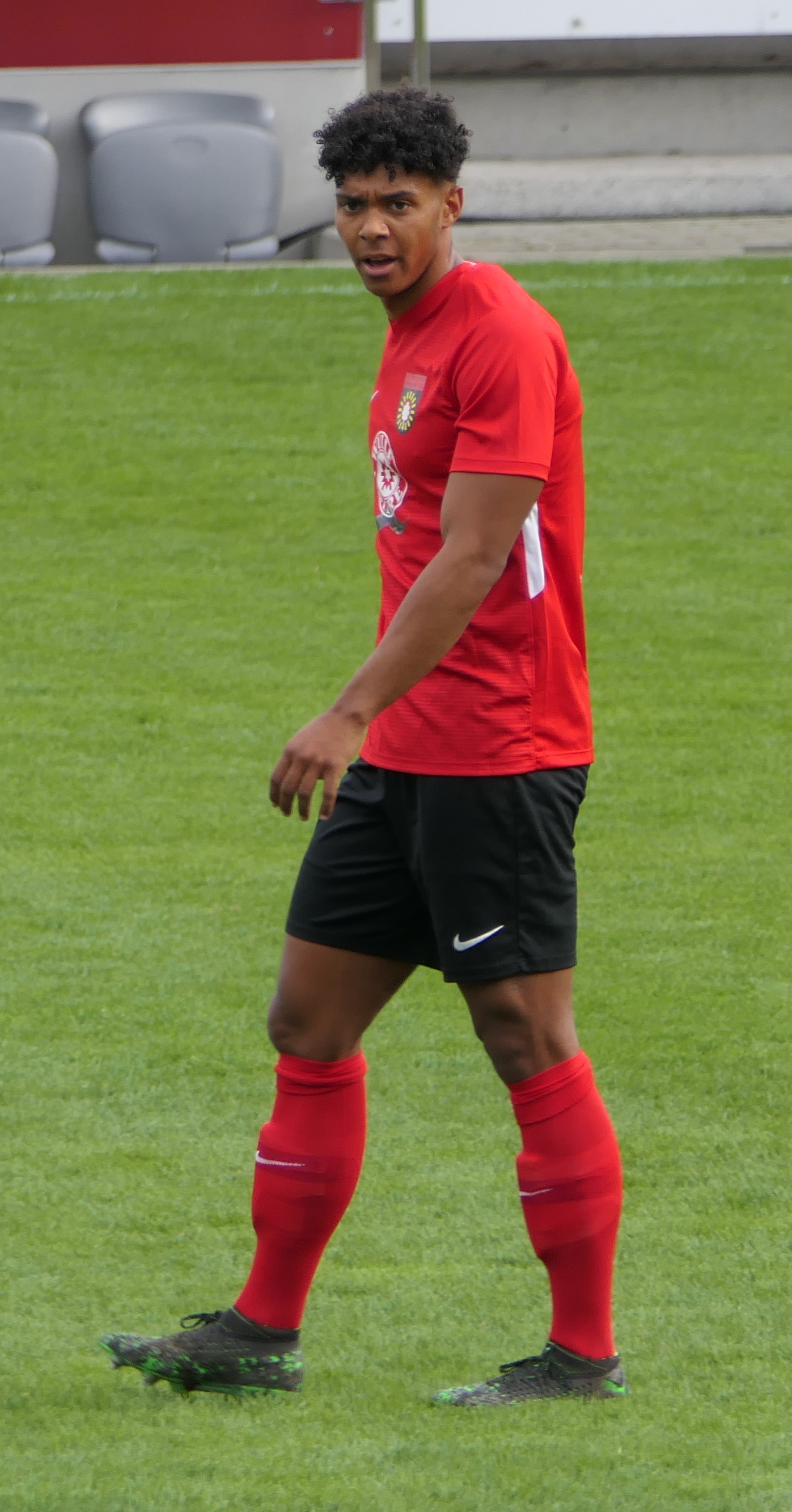
- Sommer in 2019

Personal information
- Full name: Niklas Wilson Sommer
- Date of birth: 2 April 1998 (age 28)
- Place of birth: Dessau, Germany
- Height: 1.79 m (5 ft 10 in)
- Position: Right-back

Youth career
- SV Dessau 05
- –2007: KSD Hajduk Nürnberg
- 2007–2017: 1. FC Nürnberg

Senior career*
Years	Team	Apps	(Gls)
2017	1. FC Nürnberg II	1	(0)
2017–2018	VfB Stuttgart II	34	(0)
2019–2020	Sonnenhof Großaspach	23	(0)
2020–2021	DAC Dunajská Streda	12	(0)
2021–2023	Waldhof Mannheim	40	(0)
2023–2025	1. FC Nürnberg II	16	(0)

International career^{‡}
2013	Germany U16	4	(0)
- * Club domestic league appearances and goals as of 24 January 2025 ‡ National team caps and goals as of 15:59, 16 March 2019 (UTC)

Niklas Wilson Sommer (born 2 April 1998) is a German professional footballer who plays as a right-back for 1. FC Nürnberg II.

== Club career ==
Sommer made his professional debut for Sonnenhof Großaspach in the 3. Liga on 16 March 2019, starting in the away match against SpVgg Unterhaching before being substituted out in the 80th minute for Jonas Meiser, with the match finishing as a 0–0 draw.

On 23 January 2025, 1. FC Nürnberg II and Sommer agreed to terminate his contract.

== International career ==
Sommer was born in Germany and he is a youth international for Germany, having represented the Germany U16s.
