= Jorge Méndez =

Salvadoran footballer (born 2001)

Personal information
- Full name: Jorge Antonio Méndez Castillo
- Date of birth: 6 April 2001 (age 25)
- Place of birth: Panama City, Panama
- Height: 1.68 m (5 ft 6 in)
- Position: Left winger

Team information
- Current team: San Francisco
- Number: 11

Senior career*
Years	Team	Apps	(Gls)
2017–2022	CD Universitario	43	(1)
2019–2020	→ Dunajská Streda (loan)	6	(0)
2022	Plaza Amador	13	(1)
2022–2024	Once Caldas	13	(0)
2023–2024	→ San Francisco (loan)	10	(0)
2026–	San Francisco	13	(1)

International career^{‡}
2017	Panama U17	5	(0)
2018–2019	Panama U20	9	(0)
2024	Panama U23	2	(0)
2022	Panama	2	(0)
2026–	El Salvador	1	(0)
- * Club domestic league appearances and goals as of 00:01, 2 November 2026 (UTC) ‡ National team caps and goals as of 13 November 2026

Jorge Antonio Méndez Castillo (born 6 April 2001) is a professional footballer who plays as a left winger for Liga LPF club San Francisco. Born in Panama and a 2-time player for the Panama national team, he represents the El Salvador national football team.

== Career ==
=== Universitario ===
Méndez began his senior career with CD Universitario in his native Panama, making his league debut for the club on 12 February 2017 in a 1–0 victory over Árabe Unido.

=== DAC Dunajská Streda ===
In September 2019, Méndez moved to Slovak club DAC on a two-year loan. During his loan, Méndez had also appeared with DAC's 2. Liga affiliate ŠTK Šamorín. In January 2021, Méndez requested his release from the club due to family reasons with the intent to continue his career in Panama.

== International career ==
Méndez was born in Panama, and is of Salvadoran descent through his mother. He initially played in Panama's youth level squads going on to earn two senior caps in 2022. In 2026, he switched allegiance to El Salvador and eventually made his debut on 13 November 2026 in a CONCACAF Nations League Play-in match against Saint Martin.
