= Ardian Berisha =

Swedish footballer

Personal information
- Full name: Ardian Berisha
- Date of birth: 7 May 1998 (age 28)
- Place of birth: Sweden
- Height: 1.90 m (6 ft 3 in)
- Position: Forward

Team information
- Current team: Rosengård

Senior career*
Years	Team	Apps	(Gls)
–2017	Halmstad	0	(0)
2018	Laholms	11	(9)
2018	Halmia	10	(0)
2019	Vinbergs	23	(11)
2020	Trepça '89	2	(0)
2020–2021	Senica	6	(0)
2022	Pohronie	5	(1)
2023–	Rosengård	?	(?)
- * Club domestic league appearances and goals as of 20:11, 9 January 2024 (UTC)

Ardian Berisha (born 7 May 1998 in Sweden) is a Swedish footballer currently playing for Rosengård.

== Career ==
In 2018, he trialed for English second division team Leeds United after failing to make an appearance for Halmstads BK in the Swedish top flight due to injury.

For 2018, Berisha signed for Swedish fifth division side Laholms, despite receiving offers from Trepça '89 in Kosovo.

In 2020, he signed for Senica in the Slovak top flight from Swedish fourth division outfit of Vinbergs IF.
