= Sidney Friede =

German footballer (born 1998)

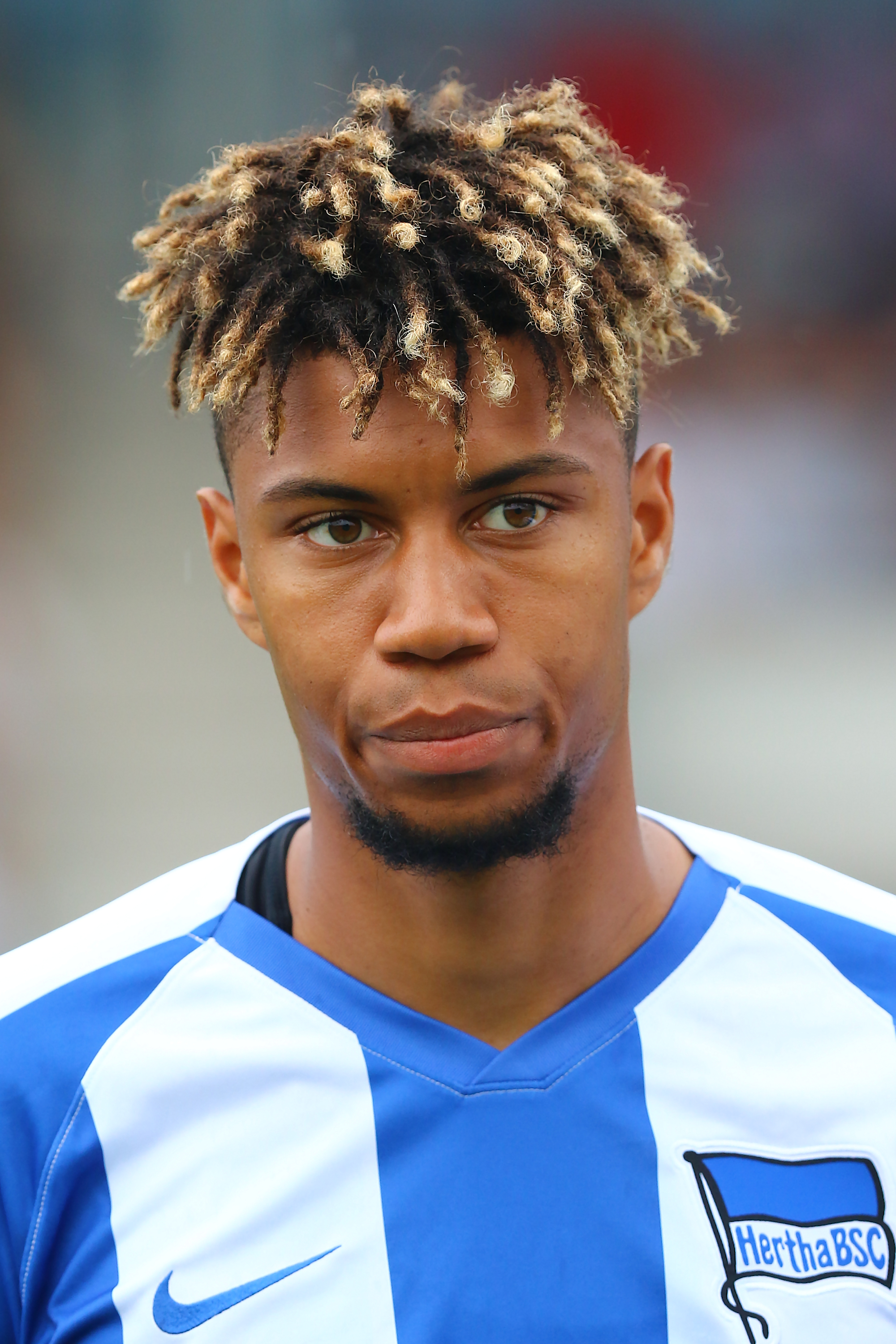
- Friede with Hertha BSC in 2019

Personal information
- Date of birth: 12 April 1998 (age 28)
- Place of birth: Berlin, Germany
- Height: 1.88 m (6 ft 2 in)
- Position: Midfielder

Youth career
- SC Staaken
- 2012–2016: Hertha BSC

Senior career*
Years	Team	Apps	(Gls)
2016–2019	Hertha BSC II	47	(5)
2019	Hertha BSC	0	(0)
2019	→ Royal Excel Mouscron (loan)	10	(2)
2020	Wehen Wiesbaden	1	(0)
2020–2021	Dunajská Streda	10	(3)

International career
2016	Germany U18	3	(0)
2016–2017	Germany U19	7	(1)
2017–2019	Germany U20	5	(2)
- * Club domestic league appearances and goals as of 1 July 2021

Sidney Deon Bruce Friede (born 12 April 1998) is a former German professional footballer who played as a midfielder.

== Club career ==
On 1 January 2020, Friede joined SV Wehen Wiesbaden on a deal for the rest of the season.

In July 2020, he signed with Fortuna Liga side DAC Dunajská Streda, managed by Bernd Storck. The side finished second in the 2020–21 season. Following the end of the season, he announced his retirement from professional football, due to a knee injury.

== International career ==
He was part of the Germany U19 team which competed in the 2017 UEFA European Championship, in which he scored a penalty in a 3–0 win over Bulgaria U19.
