= Dominik Veselovský =

Czech-Slovak footballer

Personal information
- Date of birth: 19 July 2002 (age 24)
- Place of birth: Plzeň, Czech Republic
- Height: 1.67 m (5 ft 6 in)
- Positions: Attacking midfielder; forward

Team information
- Current team: Dukla Banská Bystrica
- Number: 20

Youth career
- 2009–2010: Fomat Martin
- 2009–2010: → Štart Priekopa (loan)
- 2011–2018: Ružomberok
- 2018–2019: DAC Dunajská Streda

Senior career*
Years	Team	Apps	(Gls)
2019−2024	DAC Dunajská Streda	44	(4)
2019−2022	→ ŠTK Šamorín	23	(0)
2024	→ Dukla Banská Bystrica (loan)	12	(1)
2024–	Dukla Banská Bystrica	54	(9)

International career^{‡}
2016	Slovakia U15	1	(0)
2019−2021	Slovakia U19	8	(1)
2023–	Slovakia U21	11	(1)
- * Club domestic league appearances and goals as of 25 May 2026 ‡ National team caps and goals as of 26 March 2024

Dominik Veselovský (born 19 July 2002) is a Slovak footballer who plays for Dukla Banská Bystrica of the Niké Liga as a midfielder and also features for Slovakia U21.

== Club career ==
=== DAC Dunajská Streda ===
Veselovský made his professional Fortuna Liga debut for DAC in an away fixture against ViOn Zlaté Moravce on 21 July 2019. Veselovský was fielded in the 64th minute as a tactical substitute, replacing Danylo Beskorovainyi, with the role of strengthening the offence and equalising the game as DAC was one down, following a first-half goal by Denis Duga. Within five minutes Zsolt Kalmár scored the equaliser and secured three points late in the second half. DAC won 2:1.

== International career ==
Veselovský enjoyed his first Slovakia U21 national team recognition on 17 March 2022 under Jaroslav Kentoš ahead of two 2023 Under-21 European Championship qualifiers against Northern Ireland and Spain, when he was listed as an alternate to the 23-player squad.

He was first recognised in Slovak senior national team nomination in November 2022 by Francesco Calzona being listed as an alternate for two friendly fixtures against Montenegro and Marek Hamšík's retirement game against Chile. In December 2022, Veselovský was shortlisted for senior national team prospective players' training camp at NTC Senec.
