= Yhoan Andzouana =

Congolese international footballer

Personal information
- Full name: Yhoan Many Andzouana
- Date of birth: 13 December 1996 (age 29)
- Place of birth: Brazzaville, Republic of the Congo
- Height: 1.77 m (5 ft 9 1/2 in)
- Positions: Left back; winger

Team information
- Current team: Konyaspor
- Number: 23

Youth career
- –2011: Sarcelles AAS
- 2011–2017: AS Monaco

Senior career*
| Years | Team | Apps | (Gls) |
| 2014–2017 | AS Monaco B | 56 | (10) |
| 2017 | AS Monaco | 0 | (0) |
| 2017–2019 | Peralada | 64 | (7) |
| 2018–2019 | Girona | 0 | (0) |
| 2019–2020 | KSV Roeselare | 21 | (4) |
| 2020–2025 | DAC Dunajská Streda | 136 | (15) |
| 2025– | Konyaspor | 31 | (2) |

International career^{‡}
| 2015 | Congo U23 | 2 | (0) |
| 2019–2023 | Congo | 8 | (0) |
- * Club domestic league appearances and goals as of 10 June 2026 ‡ National team caps and goals as of 13 December 2023

Yhoan Andzouana (born 13 December 1996) is a Congolese professional footballer who plays as a midfielder for Konyaspor in the Süper Lig.

== Club career ==
=== Monaco ===
Andzouana made his professional debut on 26 April 2017 in the Coupe de France semi-final against Paris Saint-Germain. He started the game and played the whole match in a 5–0 away loss.

=== DAC Dunajská Streda ===
On 29 July 2020, Andzouana's transfer to Dunajská Streda was announced, as he signed a three-year deal with the Slovak club.

=== Konyaspor ===
In Julz 2025, Andzouana's transfer to the Turkish outfit Konyaspor was announced.

== International career ==
He made his debut for Congo national football team on 13 November 2019 in a 2021 Africa Cup of Nations qualification game against Senegal.

== Career statistics ==
=== Club ===
(Correct as of 26 April 2017)

| Club | Season | League | | Cup | | League Cup | | Europe | | Other | | Total | |
| Club | Season | Apps | Goals | Apps | Goals | Apps | Goals | Apps | Goals | Apps | Goals | Apps | Goals |
|---|---|---|---|---|---|---|---|---|---|---|---|---|---|
| Monaco | 2016–17 | 0 | 0 | 1 | 0 | 0 | 0 | 0 | 0 | — | | 1 | 0 |
| Career total | | 0 | 0 | 1 | 0 | 0 | 0 | 0 | 0 | 0 | 0 | 1 | 0 |
