= Zsolt Kalmár =

Hungarian footballer (born 1995)

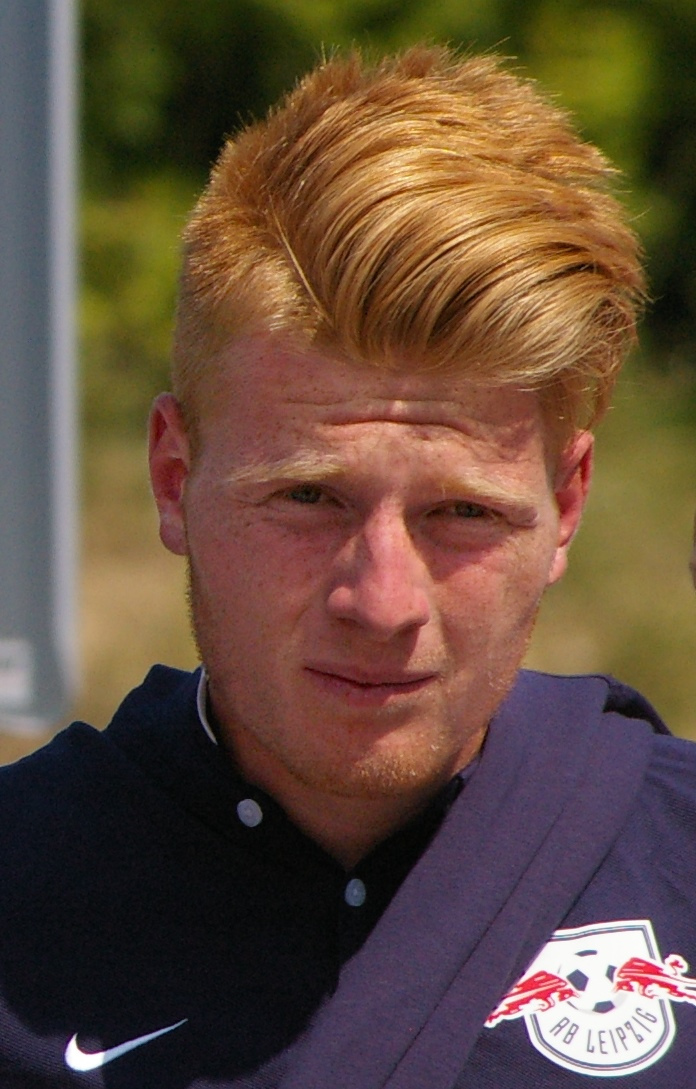
- Kalmár with RB Leipzig in 2015

Personal information
- Full name: Zsolt Kalmár
- Date of birth: 9 June 1995 (age 31)
- Place of birth: Győr, Hungary
- Height: 1.85 m (6 ft 1 in)
- Position: Midfielder

Team information
- Current team: Gyirmót
- Number: 10

Youth career
- 2005–2013: ETO Győr

Senior career*
Years	Team	Apps	(Gls)
2013–2014	ETO Győr	23	(3)
2014–2016	RB Leipzig II	14	(6)
2014–2018	RB Leipzig	21	(0)
2016	→ FSV Frankfurt (loan)	12	(1)
2017	→ Brøndby (loan)	13	(0)
2017–2018	→ DAC Dunajská Streda (loan)	25	(4)
2018–2023	DAC Dunajská Streda	96	(39)
2023–2025	Fehérvár	26	(4)
2025–	Gyirmót	9	(0)

International career
2012–2013	Hungary U17	5	(0)
2012–2014	Hungary U19	8	(3)
2015–2016	Hungary U21	8	(1)
2014–2023	Hungary	36	(3)
- * Club domestic league appearances and goals as of 20:01, 4 November 2026 (UTC)

Zsolt Kalmár (Hungarian pronunciation: [ˈʒolt ˈkɒlmaːr]; born 9 June 1995) is a Hungarian professional footballer who plays as an attacking midfielder for Nemzeti Bajnokság II club Gyirmót. He has won 36 caps for the Hungary national team.

Kalmár came through the academy of his home-town club ETO Győr and won the Nemzeti Bajnokság I title in his first season as a senior player. He joined RB Leipzig in 2014 and was loaned to FSV Frankfurt and Brøndby. In 2017 he moved to Slovak club DAC Dunajská Streda, first on loan and then permanently. Over six years at DAC he became club captain and one of the leading players in the Slovak league. He was named the best player in the Slovak Super Liga for the 2020–21 season.

Serious knee injuries have repeatedly interrupted his career. They cost him places at UEFA Euro 2020 and UEFA Euro 2024. He returned to Hungary with Fehérvár in 2023, and joined third-tier Gyirmót in 2025. Gyirmót won promotion to the second tier the following year.

== Club career ==
=== ETO Győr ===
Kalmár joined the youth academy of ETO Győr in 2005. In October 2012, aged 17, he had a trial with Dutch league leaders Feyenoord. He made his debut for the reserves in Nemzeti Bajnokság II on 3 March 2013, starting a 1–0 defeat away to Zalaegerszeg.

Head coach Attila Pintér handed Kalmár his first-team debut on 19 May 2013, against Budapest Honvéd in Nemzeti Bajnokság I. In his second league appearance, he scored in a 3–2 win away to Egri FC. Győr finished the season as champions. Kalmár opened the following campaign by scoring in a 3–0 win over Debreceni VSC in the Szuperkupa. He became a regular member of the squad in 2013–14, making 26 league appearances as Győr finished second.

=== RB Leipzig ===
On 28 July 2014, Kalmár signed a five-year contract with 2. Bundesliga club RB Leipzig. He made his debut on 22 August, replacing Joshua Kimmich in a 1–0 home win over Erzgebirge Aue. His first start came on 30 November against SV Sandhausen. He went on to make 17 league appearances in his first season. On 28 August 2015, he came off the bench against Union Berlin and within minutes his cross led to an own goal by Michael Parensen. Opportunities remained scarce, however, and he made only four league appearances in the first half of 2015–16. In January 2016 Leipzig made him available for loan, with Fortuna Düsseldorf, FSV Frankfurt, Ferencváros and Sturm Graz among the interested clubs.

==== Loan to FSV Frankfurt ====
Kalmár joined fellow 2. Bundesliga club FSV Frankfurt on loan on 28 January 2016. He made his debut as a substitute against Karlsruher SC on 7 February. On 2 March, he scored his first goal for the club against MSV Duisburg. It was his only goal in 12 league appearances before he returned to Leipzig.

==== Loan to Brøndby ====
On 30 January 2017, Kalmár joined Danish club Brøndby on a loan running until June 2018. There he was reunited with head coach Alexander Zorniger and assistant Tamás Bódog, whom he knew from Leipzig. He made his Superliga debut on 19 February as a late substitute against Copenhagen. His first goal for the club came on 8 March, in a 4–1 Danish Cup win away to BK Marienlyst. He provided assists in league matches against AC Horsens and Lyngby. On 13 April, he came off the bench to score late in extra time as Brøndby beat Randers 4–2 in the cup quarter-finals. Brøndby and Leipzig ended the loan early in August 2017.

=== DAC Dunajská Streda ===
On 10 August 2017, Kalmár joined Slovak club DAC Dunajská Streda on a season-long loan. He made his debut three days later as a substitute against Slovan Bratislava. A week later he scored and provided an assist in a 4–2 win over champions MŠK Žilina. DAC supporters voted him their best player of the autumn.

On 6 July 2018, DAC took up the option to buy Kalmár from Leipzig, and he signed a three-year contract. In the 2018–19 season he scored eight goals and provided five assists in 29 league appearances as DAC finished as runners-up. The Slovak daily Sport named him in its team of the season.

Kalmár was made club captain before the 2019–20 season. He scored twice on the opening day in a 2–1 win over ViOn Zlaté Moravce. In August, however, months of chronic knee ligament inflammation forced him to undergo surgery. He returned on 20 October. He was again named in the league's team of the season.

The 2020–21 season was the best of his career. He scored in successive 6–0 wins over ŠKF Sereď and FC Nitra in the opening two rounds. He finished with 13 league goals as DAC were runners-up again. Only his teammate Eric Ramírez scored more for the club. He was named the best player in the Fortuna Liga.

His season ended in March 2021, when he suffered a serious knee injury on international duty. He needed a second operation in May and was expected to miss the rest of the year. He did not play again until the 2022–23 season, in which he scored eight goals in 26 league appearances. He also extended his contract with DAC until the summer of 2025.

At the start of the 2023–24 season, Kalmár set up the opening goal in a home win over Dila Gori in the first qualifying round of the Europa Conference League. DAC lost the return leg 2–0 in Georgia and went out. He received little playing time in the opening weeks of the season. In August 2023 the club agreed to let him leave. Owner Oszkár Világi said that both sides had come to accept the partnership could not continue. Kalmár left DAC having scored 47 goals and provided 29 assists in 148 competitive matches. Supporters organised a surprise farewell for him before he departed.

=== Fehérvár ===
On 11 August 2023, Kalmár signed a two-year contract with Nemzeti Bajnokság I club Fehérvár, with an option for a third year. He marked his debut with an assist in a 2–2 draw with Puskás Akadémia. On 25 November 2023, he was injured in a league match against Kecskeméti TE. After surgery in December, he had a further knee operation in January 2024. It ruled him out of UEFA Euro 2024.

Kalmár returned at the end of September 2024 and said that he hoped to win back his place in the national team. In late March 2025, however, he injured his knee again and needed arthroscopic surgery. Fehérvár were relegated at the end of the season. Kalmár left the club when his contract expired in June 2025.

=== Gyirmót ===
On 27 August 2025, Kalmár joined Nemzeti Bajnokság III club Gyirmót, returning to his home city of Győr. Shortly afterwards his knee pain returned, and he had corrective surgery at the end of September. He returned on 29 March 2026 after 387 days out, scoring a hat-trick and providing three assists for the reserve team in a 7–0 county league win over Fertőszentmiklós. He made four first-team appearances in NB III that season, three of them as a substitute. Gyirmót won the Northwest group. Before the promotion play-off, Kalmár said his aim on joining had been to reach NB II and possibly the top flight. Gyirmót beat Monor in the play-off to win promotion to Nemzeti Bajnokság II.

== International career ==
Kalmár played for Hungary at the 2014 UEFA European Under-19 Championship and the 2015 FIFA U-20 World Cup. He made his senior debut on 22 May 2014 in a 2–2 friendly draw with Denmark. He later became a key player under head coach Marco Rossi.

On 8 October 2020, Kalmár deputised for the injured Dominik Szoboszlai in the Euro 2020 play-off semi-final away to Bulgaria. His corner led to Willi Orbán's opening goal, and he scored the second himself early in the second half of a 3–1 win. Hungary beat Iceland in the final the following month to qualify for the tournament. Three days after the Iceland match, he scored in a 1–1 draw with Serbia in the Nations League. Hungary won the group and were promoted to League A.

On 31 March 2021, Kalmár suffered a serious knee injury in a World Cup qualifier against Andorra. As a result he missed Euro 2020. He was recalled to the squad in November 2022 for the first time since the injury. On 20 November, in Balázs Dzsudzsák's farewell match against Greece, he came on in stoppage time. With almost his first touch, he scored the winning goal from a free kick in a 2–1 victory at the Puskás Aréna.

Kalmár played in several of Hungary's qualifiers for Euro 2024. On 14 October 2023, he was shown a second yellow card after the final whistle of a 2–1 win over Serbia. The dismissal ruled him out of the next match against Lithuania. When Hungary sealed qualification with a 2–2 draw in Bulgaria in November, he described the moment as a reward for not giving up through his years of injury. Knee surgery in early 2024 meant that he missed a second European Championship. He has won 36 caps and scored three goals for Hungary.

== Career statistics ==
=== Club ===
As of match played 20 October 2024

Appearances and goals by club, season and competition
Club	Season	League			National cup (Note: Includes Magyar Kupa, DFB-Pokal, Danish Cup, Slovak Cup)		League cup (Note: Includes Ligakupa)		Continental		Other (Note: Includes Szuperkupa, DFB-Supercup and FIFA Club World Cup)		Total	
Club	Season	Division	Apps	Goals	Apps	Goals	Apps	Goals	Apps	Goals	Apps	Goals	Apps	Goals
Győr	2012–13	Nemzeti Bajnokság I	2	1	0	0	3	1	—		—		5	2
Győr	2013–14	Nemzeti Bajnokság I	21	2	3	0	2	0	0	0	1	1	27	3
Győr	Total		23	3	3	0	5	1	0	0	1	1	32	5
RB Leipzig	2014–15	2. Bundesliga	17	0	0	0	—		—		—		17	0
RB Leipzig	2015–16	2. Bundesliga	4	0	0	0	—		—		—		4	0
RB Leipzig	2016–17	2. Bundesliga	0	0	1	0	—		—		—		1	0
RB Leipzig	Total		21	0	1	0	0	0	0	0	0	0	22	0
FSV Frankfurt (loan)	2015–16	2. Bundesliga	12	1	0	0	—		—		—		12	1
Brøndby (loan)	2016–17	Danish Superliga	12	0	3	2	—		—		—		15	2
Brøndby (loan)	2017–18	Danish Superliga	1	0	0	0	—		3	0	—		4	0
Brøndby (loan)	Total		13	0	3	2	0	0	3	0	0	0	19	2
DAC Dunajská Streda (loan)	2017–18	Fortuna Liga	25	4	4	1	—		—		—		29	5
DAC Dunajská Streda	2018–19	Fortuna Liga	29	8	2	2	—		4	0	—		35	10
DAC Dunajská Streda	2019–20	Fortuna Liga	16	9	3	0	—		4	0	—		23	9
DAC Dunajská Streda	2020–21	Fortuna Liga	23	13	0	0	—		3	0	—		26	13
DAC Dunajská Streda	2021–22	Fortuna Liga	0	0	0	0	—		0	0	—		0	0
DAC Dunajská Streda	2022–23	Fortuna Liga	26	8	3	1	—		2	0	—		31	9
DAC Dunajská Streda	2023–24	Fortuna Liga	2	0	0	0	—		2 (Note: Appearances in UEFA Europa Conference League)	0	—		4	0
DAC Dunajská Streda	Total		96	38	8	3	0	0	15	0	0	0	119	41
Fehérvár	2023–24	Nemzeti Bajnokság I	11	3	1	0	—		2	0	—		14	3
Fehérvár	2024–25	Nemzeti Bajnokság I	3	0	0	0	—		0	0	—		3	0
Fehérvár	Total		14	3	1	0	—		2	0	—		17	3
Career total			204	49	20	6	5	1	20	0	1	1	250	57

=== International ===
As of match played 19 November 2023

Appearances and goals by national team and year
National team	Year	Apps	Goals
Hungary	2014	5	0
Hungary	2015	2	0
Hungary	2016	0	0
Hungary	2017	2	0
Hungary	2018	4	0
Hungary	2019	3	0
Hungary	2020	8	2
Hungary	2021	3	0
Hungary	2022	2	1
Hungary	2023	7	0
Total		36	3

Scores and results list Hungary's goal tally first, score column indicates score after each Kalmár goal.

List of international goals scored by Zsolt Kalmár
No.	Date	Venue	Opponent	Score	Result	Competition
1	8 October 2020	Vasil Levski National Stadium, Sofia, Bulgaria	Bulgaria	2–0	3–1	UEFA Euro 2020 qualifying play-offs
2	15 November 2020	Puskás Aréna, Budapest, Hungary	Serbia	1–1	1–1	2020–21 UEFA Nations League B
3	20 November 2022	Puskás Aréna, Budapest, Hungary	Greece	2–1	2–1	Friendly

== Honours ==
Győr

- Nemzeti Bajnokság I: 2012–13

Individual

- Slovak Super Liga Player of the Month: August 2020
- Slovak Super Liga Goal of the Month: November/December 2019, February/March 2021
- Slovak Super Liga Player of the Season: 2020-21
- Slovak Super Liga Team of the Season: 2019-20, 2020-21
