= Mateus Brunetti =

Brazilian international footballer

Personal information
- Full name: Mateus Brunetti Valor
- Date of birth: 18 November 1999 (age 26)
- Place of birth: São Paulo, Brazil
- Height: 1.84 m (6 ft 0 in)
- Position: Centre back

Team information
- Current team: Shimizu S-Pulse
- Number: 25

Youth career
- São Paulo
- –2019: Figueirense

Senior career*
Years	Team	Apps	(Gls)
2017	Portuguesa	0	(0)
2019-2021	Figueirense	30	(1)
2021−2025	DAC Dunajská Streda	94	(5)
2021	→ Šamorín (loan)	8	(0)
2025–	Shimizu S-Pulse	21	(0)
- * Club domestic league appearances and goals as of 10 August 2026

Mateus Brunetti Valor (born 18 November 1999), known as Mateus Brunetti, is a Brazilian footballer who plays for J1 League club Shimizu S-Pulse as a centre back.

== Club career ==
Brunetti made his professional Fortuna Liga debut for DAC Dunajská Streda in match against Zemplín Michalovce on 25 July 2021.
