= Luciano Vera =

Argentine footballer

Personal information
- Full name: Luciano Fabian Vera
- Date of birth: 9 February 2002 (age 24)
- Place of birth: Wanda, Argentina
- Height: 1.67 m (5 ft 6 in)
- Position: Defender

Team information
- Current team: Tirana
- Number: 2

Youth career
- –2020: River Plate

Senior career*
Years	Team	Apps	(Gls)
2020−2021	River Plate II		
2021−2023	DAC Dunajská Streda	8	(0)
2021−2022	→ ŠTK Šamorín (loan)	26	(0)
2022−2023	→ Deportivo Maipú (loan)	5	(0)
2023–2025	Győr	35	(0)
2025–	Tirana	54	(0)

International career^{‡}
2018	Argentina U16	3	(0)
2018–2019	Argentina U17	14	(0)
- * Club domestic league appearances and goals as of 27 November 2024 ‡ National team caps and goals as of 8 November 2019

Luciano Vera (born 9 February 2002) is an Argentine footballer who plays for Albanian club Tirana.

== Club career ==
=== DAC Dunajská Streda ===
Vera made his professional Fortuna Liga debut for Dunajská Streda in match against Spartak Trnava on 22 May 2021.
