= Eric Ramírez (footballer, born 1998) =

Venezuelan footballer (born 1998)

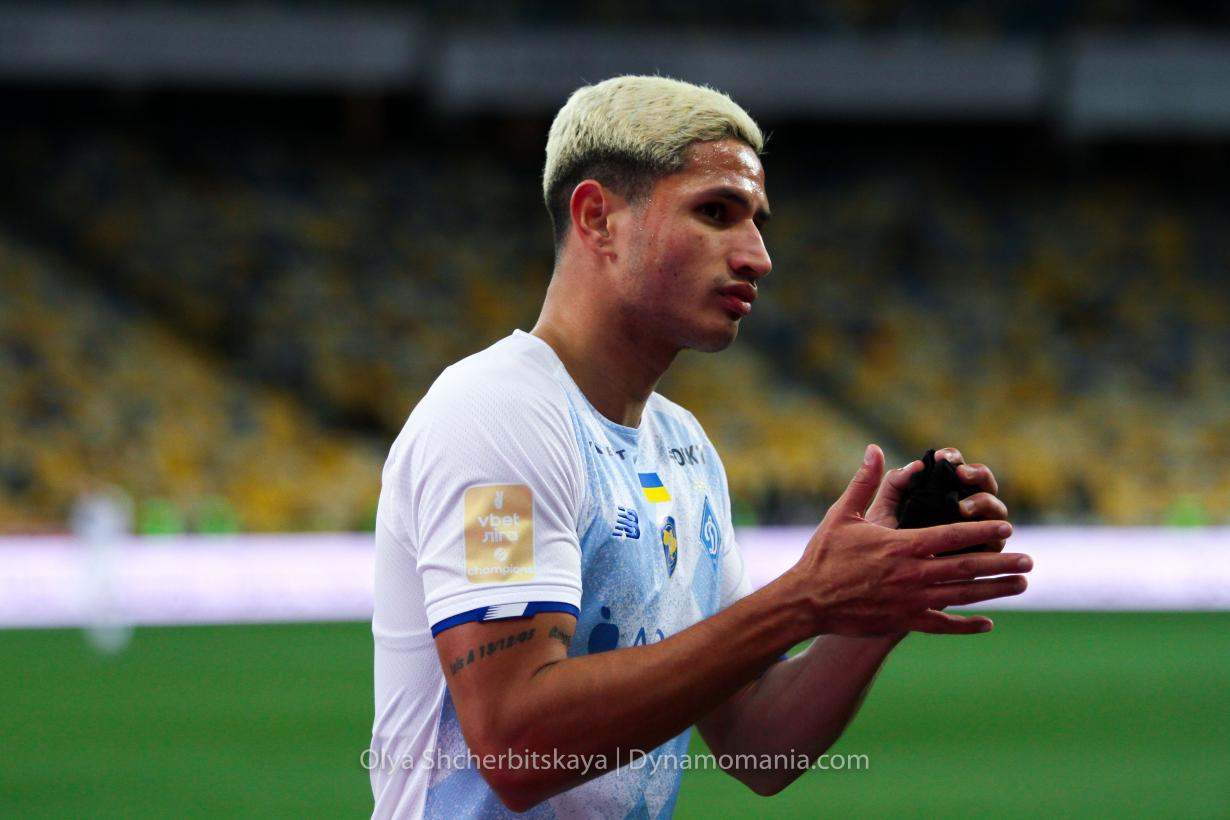

Personal information
- Full name: Eric Kleybel Ramírez Matheus
- Date of birth: 20 November 1998 (age 27)
- Place of birth: Barinas, Venezuela
- Height: 1.90 m (6 ft 3 in)
- Position: Forward

Team information
- Current team: Carabobo (on loan from Dynamo Kyiv)

Youth career
- Zamora

Senior career*
Years	Team	Apps	(Gls)
2016–2017	Zamora	2	(0)
2017	→ Estudiantes Caracas (loan)	0	(0)
2017–2019	Karviná	30	(3)
2019	→ Senica (loan)	12	(5)
2019–2021	DAC Dunajská Streda	54	(23)
2021–	Dynamo Kyiv	7	(2)
2022	→ Sporting Gijón (loan)	12	(0)
2022–2023	→ Slovan Bratislava (loan)	16	(3)
2023–2024	→ Atlético Nacional (loan)	36	(8)
2024–2025	→ Tigre (loan)	18	(1)
2025–2026	→ Bohemians 1905 (loan)	8	(0)
2026–	→ Carabobo (loan)	9	(5)

International career^{‡}
2020–	Venezuela	12	(2)
- * Club domestic league appearances and goals as of 07:19, 12 August 2026 (UTC) ‡ National team caps and goals as of 23:47, 19 November 2024 (UTC)

Eric Kleybel Ramírez Matheus (born 20 November 1998) is a Venezuelan professional footballer who plays as a forward for Liga FUTVE club Carabobo on loan from Dynamo Kyiv and the Venezuela national team.

== Club career ==
=== Karviná ===
He signed for the Czech First League side Karviná from Zamora in 2017. He scored his first goal for them on 24 September in their 2–1 home win against Zbrojovka Brno.

==== Loan to Senica ====
On 7 February 2019, Ramirez was loaned out to Senica for the rest of the season.

=== Dynamo Kyiv ===
On 23 July 2021, Ramirez signed a 5 year contract with the Ukrainian champions Dynamo Kyiv.

==== Loan to Sporting Gijón ====
On 30 January 2022, he went to Sporting Gijón on loan.

==== Loan to Bohemians 1905 ====
On 8 September 2025, Ramírez joined Czech First League club Bohemians 1905 on a one-year loan deal with an option to buy.

==== Loan to Carabobo ====
On 5 February 2026, Ramírez joined Liga FUTVE club Carabobo on a one-year loan deal.

== International career ==
He made his debut for Venezuela national football team on 13 October 2020 in a World Cup qualifier against Paraguay. He substituted Cristian Cásseres Jr. in the 89th minute.

== Career statistics ==
=== Club ===
As of match played 8 June 2026

Appearances and goals by club, season and competition
Club	Season	League			National cup (Note: Includes Copa Venezuela, Czech Cup, Slovak Cup, Ukrainian Cup, Copa Colombia)		Continental		Total	
Club	Season	Division	Apps	Goals	Apps	Goals	Apps	Goals	Apps	Goals
Zamora	2016	Venezuelan Primera División	2	0	2	0	0	0	4	0
Estudiantes de Caracas (loan)	2017	Venezuelan Segunda División	0	0	0	0	2 (Note: Appearances in Copa Sudamericana)	1	2	1
Karviná	2017–18	Czech First League	17	1	3	0	—		20	1
Karviná	2018–19	Czech First League	13	2	3	2	—		16	4
Karviná	Total		30	3	6	2	—		36	5
Senica (loan)	2018–19	Slovak First Football League	12	5	3	4	—		15	9
DAC Dunajská Streda	2019–20	Slovak First Football League	22	7	7	2	4 (Note: Appearances in UEFA Europa League)	2	33	11
DAC Dunajská Streda	2020–21	Slovak First Football League	31	16	1	0	3	1	35	17
DAC Dunajská Streda	Total		53	23	8	2	7	3	68	28
Dynamo Kyiv	2021–22	Ukrainian Premier League	4	1	1	0	2 (Note: Appearances in UEFA Champions League)	0	7	1
Dynamo Kyiv	2022–23	Ukrainian Premier League	13	3	0	0	0	0	13	3
Dynamo Kyiv	Total		17	4	1	0	2	0	20	4
Sporting Gijón (loan)	2021–22	Segunda División	12	0	—		—		12	0
Slovan Bratislava (loan)	2022–23	Slovak First Football League	16	3	1	0	12 (Note: Ten appearances and three goals in UEFA Champions League, two appearances in UEFA Europa League)	3	29	6
Atlético Nacional (loan)	2023	Categoría Primera A	20	8	5	1	2 (Note: Appearances in Copa Libertadores)	0	27	9
Atlético Nacional (loan)	2024	Categoría Primera A	16	0	0	0	2	0	18	0
Atlético Nacional (loan)	Total		36	8	5	1	4	0	45	9
Tigre (loan)	2024	Argentine Primera División	11	1	—		—		11	1
Tigre (loan)	2025	Argentine Primera División	7	0	—		—		7	0
Tigre (loan)	Total		18	1	—		—		18	1
Bohemians (loan)	2025–26	Czech First League	8	0	1	0	—		9	0
Carabobo (loan)	2026	Liga FUTVE	9	5	0	0	7 (Note: Two appearances and one goal in Copa Libertadores, five appearances and one goal in Copa Sudamericana)	2	16	7
Career total			213	52	27	9	34	9	274	70

=== International ===
As of match played 19 November 2024

Appearances and goals by national team and year
National team	Year	Apps	Goals
Venezuela	2020	1	0
Venezuela	2021	7	1
Venezuela	2023	1	0
Venezuela	2024	3	1
Total		12	2

Scores and results list Venezuela's goal tally first, score column indicates score after each Ramírez goal.

List of international goals scored by Eric Ramírez
No.	Date	Venue	Cap	Opponent	Score	Result	Competition
1	7 October 2021	Olympic Stadium, Caracas, Venezuela	4	Brazil	1–0	1–3	2022 FIFA World Cup qualification
2	30 June 2024	Q2 Stadium, Austin, United States	11	Jamaica	3–0	3–0	2024 Copa América

== Honours ==
Individual

- Slovak Super Liga Player of the Month: February/March 2021
- Slovak Super Liga Goal of the Month: August 2020, September 2020
- Slovak Super Liga Team of the Season: 2020–21
- Slovak Super Liga U-21 Team of the Season: 2020–21
