= Brahim Moumou =

German footballer

Personal information
- Date of birth: 6 May 2001 (age 25)
- Place of birth: Germany
- Height: 1.79 m (5 ft 10 in)
- Position: Forward

Team information
- Current team: TSV 1860 Munich II
- Number: 11

Youth career
- –2020: 1860 Munich

Senior career*
Years	Team	Apps	(Gls)
2020–2021	ŠTK Šamorín	7	(2)
2021−2023	DAC Dunajská Streda	30	(3)
2022−2023	→ ŠTK Šamorín (loan)	11	(0)
2024–	TSV 1860 Munich II	27	(5)
2026–	TSV 1860 Munich	0	(0)
- * Club domestic league appearances and goals as of 27 September 2026

Brahim Moumou (born 6 May 2001) is a German professional footballer who plays as a forward for TSV 1860 Munich II in Bayernliga.

== Career ==
Moumou made his professional Fortuna Liga debut for DAC Dunajská Streda in match against Žilina on 4 April 2021.

== Honours ==
Individual

- Slovak Super Liga Goal of the Month: March 2022
