= Andrej Fábry =

Slovak footballer

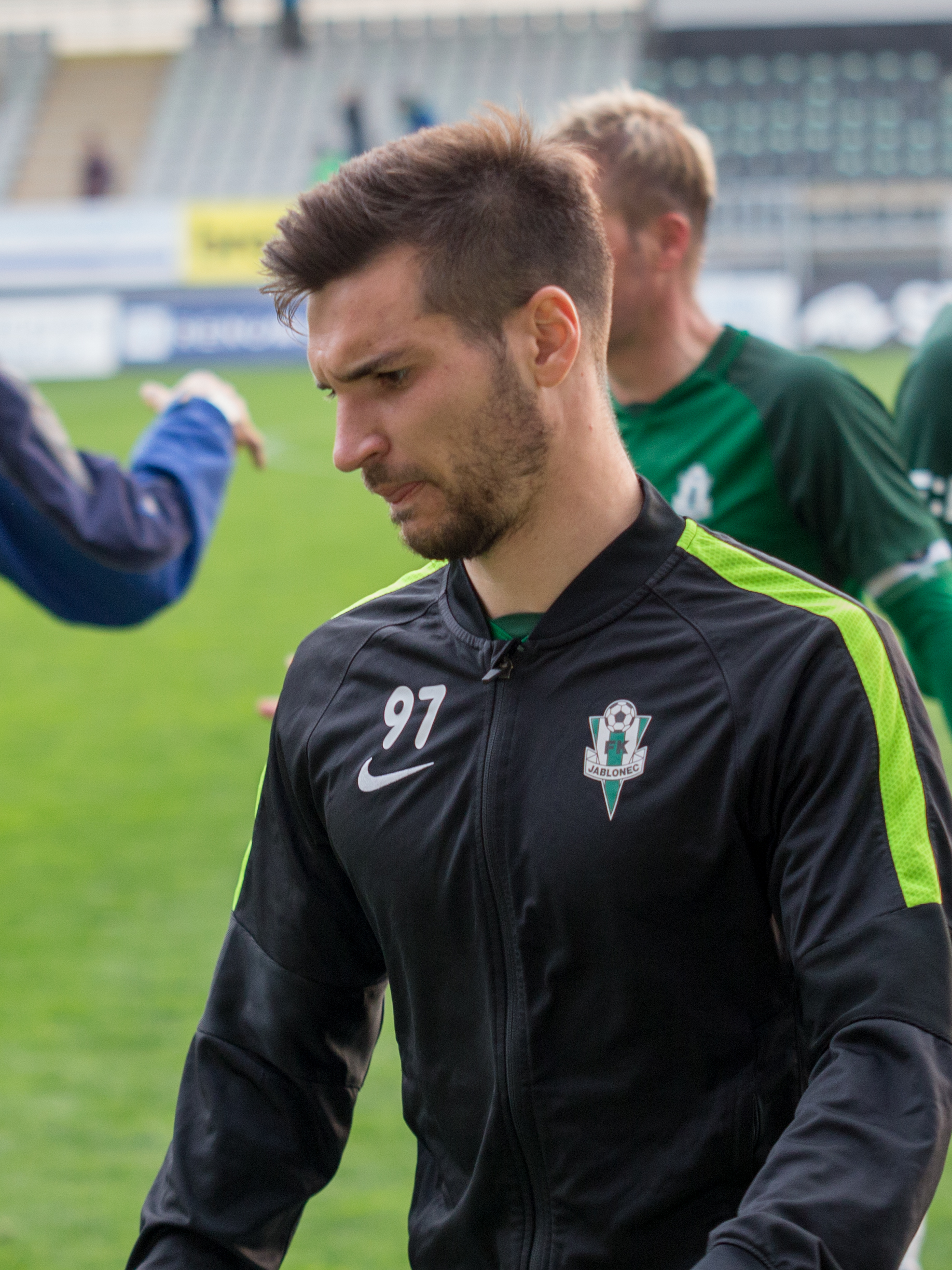
- Fábry in 2019

Personal information
- Date of birth: 1 March 1997 (age 29)
- Place of birth: Topoľčany, Slovakia
- Height: 1.77 m (5 ft 10 in)
- Position: Attacking midfielder

Team information
- Current team: Corvinul Hunedoara
- Number: 22

Youth career
- 2003–2006: Veľké Ripňany
- 2007–2008: Slovan Zbehy
- 2008–2015: Nitra

Senior career*
Years	Team	Apps	(Gls)
2015–2018	Nitra	88	(15)
2019–2020	Jablonec	2	(0)
2019–2020	→ DAC Dunajská Streda (loan)	15	(3)
2020–2022	DAC Dunajská Streda	27	(1)
2021	→ Sereď (loan)	14	(3)
2022	→ Sereď (loan)	11	(1)
2022–2023	Skalica	30	(11)
2023–2025	UTA Arad	53	(8)
2025–2026	Universitatea Cluj	31	(1)
2026–	Corvinul Hunedoara	14	(2)

International career
2018	Slovakia U21	4	(0)
- * Club domestic league appearances and goals as of 7 November 2026

Andrej Fábry (born 1 March 1997) is a Slovak professional footballer who plays as an attacking midfielder for Liga I club Corvinul Hunedoara.

== Club career ==
Fábry made his Fortuna Liga debut for Nitra against Žilina on 22 July 2017 at pod Zoborom.

== Career statistics ==
=== Club ===
As of match played 7 November 2026

Club	Season	League			National Cup (Note: Includes Slovak Cup, Cupa României)		Europe		Other		Total	
Club	Season	Division	Apps	Goals	Apps	Goals	Apps	Goals	Apps	Goals	Apps	Goals
Nitra	2015–16	2. Liga	15	0	0	0	–		–		15	0
Nitra	2016–17	2. Liga	30	8	2	1	–		–		32	9
Nitra	2017–18	Slovak First League	27	1	3	0	–		1 (Note: Appearances in Slovak First League European play-offs)	0	31	1
Nitra	2018–19	Slovak First League	16	6	1	1	–		–		17	7
Nitra	Total		88	15	6	2	–		1	0	95	17
Jablonec	2018–19	Czech First League	2	0	–		–		–		9	0
Jablonec	2019–20	Czech First League	0	0	–		0	0	–		0	0
Jablonec	Total		2	0	–		0	0	–		2	0
DAC Dunajská Streda (loan)	2019–20	Slovak First League	24	3	7	0	–		–		31	3
DAC Dunajská Streda	2020–21	Slovak First League	13	1	1	1	3 (Note: Appearances in UEFA Europa League)	0	–		17	2
DAC Dunajská Streda	2021–22	Slovak First League	5	0	2	0	1 (Note: Appearances in UEFA Conference League)	0	–		8	0
DAC Dunajská Streda	Total		42	4	10	1	4	0	–		56	5
Sereď (loan)	2020–21	Slovak First League	14	3	1	0	–		1	0	16	3
Sereď (loan)	2021–22	Slovak First League	11	1	–		–		–		11	1
Sereď (loan)	Total		25	4	1	0	–		1	0	27	4
Skalica	2022–23	Slovak First League	30	11	5	1	–		–		35	12
UTA Arad	2023–24	Liga I	33	7	2	1	–		–		35	8
UTA Arad	2024–25	Liga I	20	1	1	1	–		–		21	2
UTA Arad	Total		53	8	3	2	–		–		56	10
Universitatea Cluj	2024–25	Liga I	10	1	–		–		–		10	1
Universitatea Cluj	2025–26	Liga I	21	0	4	0	2	0	–		27	0
Universitatea Cluj	Total		31	1	4	0	2	0	–		37	1
Corvinul Hunedoara	2026–27	Liga I	14	2	2	0	–		–		16	2
Career total			285	45	31	6	6	0	2	0	324	51

== Honours ==
Universitatea Cluj

- Cupa României runner-up: 2025–26
