= Dunajská Streda =

Town in Žitný ostrov, Slovakia

Dunajská Streda Dunaszerdahely (Hungarian)
- Municipality
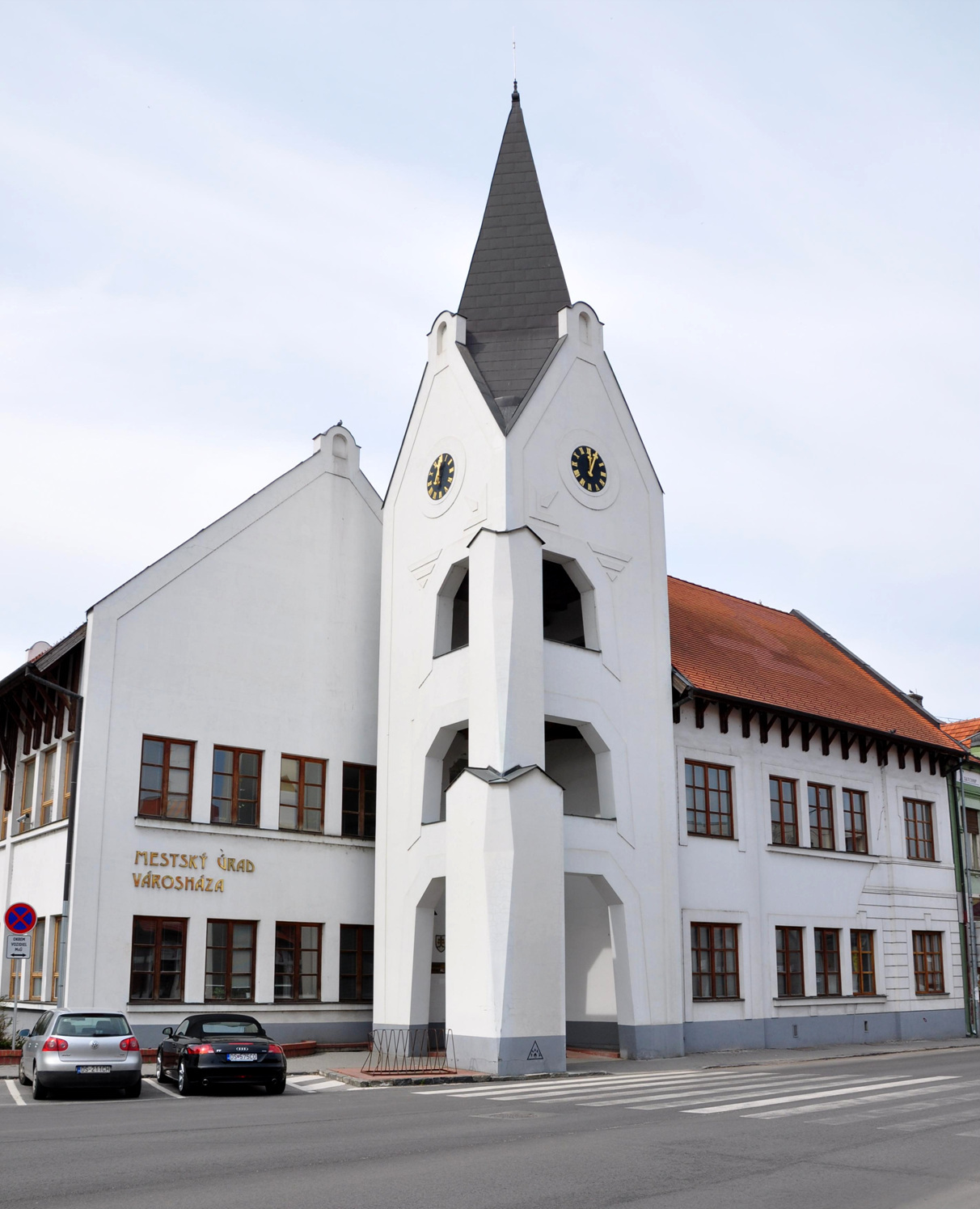
- Dunajská Streda Town Hall

- Flag Coat of arms

- Location of Dunajská Streda in the Trnava Region Location of Dunajská Streda in Slovakia
- Coordinates: 47.99°N 17.62°E
- Country: Slovakia
- Region: Trnava Region
- District: Dunajská Streda District
- First mentioned: 1254

Government
  - Mayor: Zoltán Hájos (SMK-MKP)

Area
  - Total: 31.45 km^{2} (12.14 sq mi)
- Elevation: 115 m (377 ft)

Population (2025)
  - Total: 22,720

Ethnicity
- Time zone: UTC+1 (CET)
  - Summer (DST): UTC+2 (CEST)
- Postal code: 929 01
- Area code: +421 31
- Vehicle registration plate (until 2022): DS
- Website: www.dunstreda.sk

Dunajská Streda (Slovak pronunciation: [ˈdunajskaː ˈstreda]; Hungarian: Dunaszerdahely, pronounced [ˈdunɒsɛrdɒhɛj]; German: Niedermarkt) is a town located in southern Slovakia (Trnavský kraj). Dunajská Streda is the most culturally significant town in the Žitný ostrov area. The town has a population of 22,730, with ethnic Hungarians forming the 72% majority.

== Geography ==
The municipality lies at an altitude of 115 metres (377 ft) and covers an area of 31.45 km^{2} (12.14 sq mi) (2025).

== Name ==
The name of Syridahel was first mentioned in 1256. Other early written forms of the name were Zeredahely (1270) and Zredahel (1358). Szerdahely means "Wednesday (market)place" in Hungarian, and it indicates the town had the privilege to hold a market on Wednesdays (although it was later changed to Fridays). The Hungarian word szerda is a loanword from Slavic languages; the word streda means Wednesday in Slovak, with related words existing in other Slavic languages, meaning the middle (stred) day in the week. The attribute Duna- (Dunajská; i.e., Danubian) was added in the 19th century to distinguish it from other towns with similar names (in accordance with the "one town, one name" policy of Austria-Hungary). The German name Niedermarkt means "Lower Market".

== History ==
According to archaeological evidence, the territory was inhabited in the Neolithic, Bronze, Roman, and Great Moravian period. The region was part of the rising Hungarian state since the 10th century.

During the Middle and Modern Ages, the settlement was a small market town located in the southern part of Pozsony county. It also functioned as a commercial and administrative centre for the neighbouring villages. After 1808, after 1854, and in 1960, it became amalgamated with several smaller settlements.

The first detailed description of the town came from a charter of King Charles I of Hungary from 1341, when the king gave the estate of Pókafölde to comes Tamás. In the middle of the 15th century, Szerdahely became an oppidum, or market town. The first conscription of the population happened in 1574 (26 royal serf families and 3 noble families). The next conscription in 1646 indicates that most citizens were craftsmen. The town was under the feudal jurisdiction of the Pálffy family between 1600 and 1848. Many Jews came in the 18th century. In 1880, the town had 4182 inhabitants, out of which 3531 (84.43%) were Hungarian and 416 (9.95%) were German by mother tongue. The number of the Jewish population was 1,874 (44.81%). In 1910, there were 4,679 (98.26%) Hungarian speakers (by mother tongue) from a total population of 4,762. In 1930, the town had 5,706 inhabitants, including 2,944 (51.6%) Hungarians, 2,186 (38.31%) Jews (mostly Hungarian-speaking), and 503 (8.82%) Slovaks. According to the 2021 census, 16,577 Hungarians, 4,386 Slovaks, 108 Czechs, 87 Romani people, 31 Russians, 30 Vietnamese, and 29 Ukrainians live in the city, meaning a Hungarian majority of over 70%, the second highest Hungarian population among Slovak municipalities (after leading Komárno with 17,696 ethnic Hungarians).

=== After WWI ===
In 1919, the town became part of Czechoslovakia. It was ceded to Hungary once again by the First Vienna Award in 1938, but was returned to Czechoslovakia in 1945 after World War II. On June 15, 1944, 2,970 Jews from Dunajska Streda and vicinity were sent on a transport to Auschwitz.

In 1947–48, a portion of the town's Hungarian population was expelled to Hungary in accordance with Czechoslovakia's policies based on collective guilt and later by the Czechoslovak-Hungarian population exchange. These people also had their Czechoslovak citizenship and all their estates and movables forfeited by the Czechoslovak state.

=== After WWII ===
During the communist era, the town underwent rapid modernisation and industrialisation, which has left over 85% of the city's historical centre demolished and replaced with social-realist concrete buildings typical of the era. This has also caused the city to lose its previous character. In the 1990s, the centre of the town was totally rebuilt and revitalised according to the plans of Imre Makovecz, a Hungarian architect of the "organic" school. Today, it is one of the centres of the Hungarian national community in Slovakia and is the fastest-growing city of southern Slovakia.

== Sights ==
- The Roman Catholic Church of St. George was founded in 1010, and rebuilt in 1329; in the Gothic style in 1541. It was rebuilt again in Baroque style in 1742–43. In front of the church, there is a memorial for the Hungarian Revolution in 1848–49.
- The Evangelical Church was built in 1863–83 in Romanesque Revival style. There is a new Reformed Church (1996) next door.
- The Jewish Synagogue was destroyed by a bomb in 1945, and the ruins were knocked down in 1955. There is a Holocaust Memorial (1991) on the lot today.
- The Yellow Castle was built by Márton Biró of Padányi in 1753, and was rebuilt in the Neoclassical style in the 19th century. Today, it is the home of the Csallóköz Museum.
- The Gallery of Contemporary Hungarian Artists from Slovakia
- Postmodern town hall and commercial centre by Imre Makovecz.

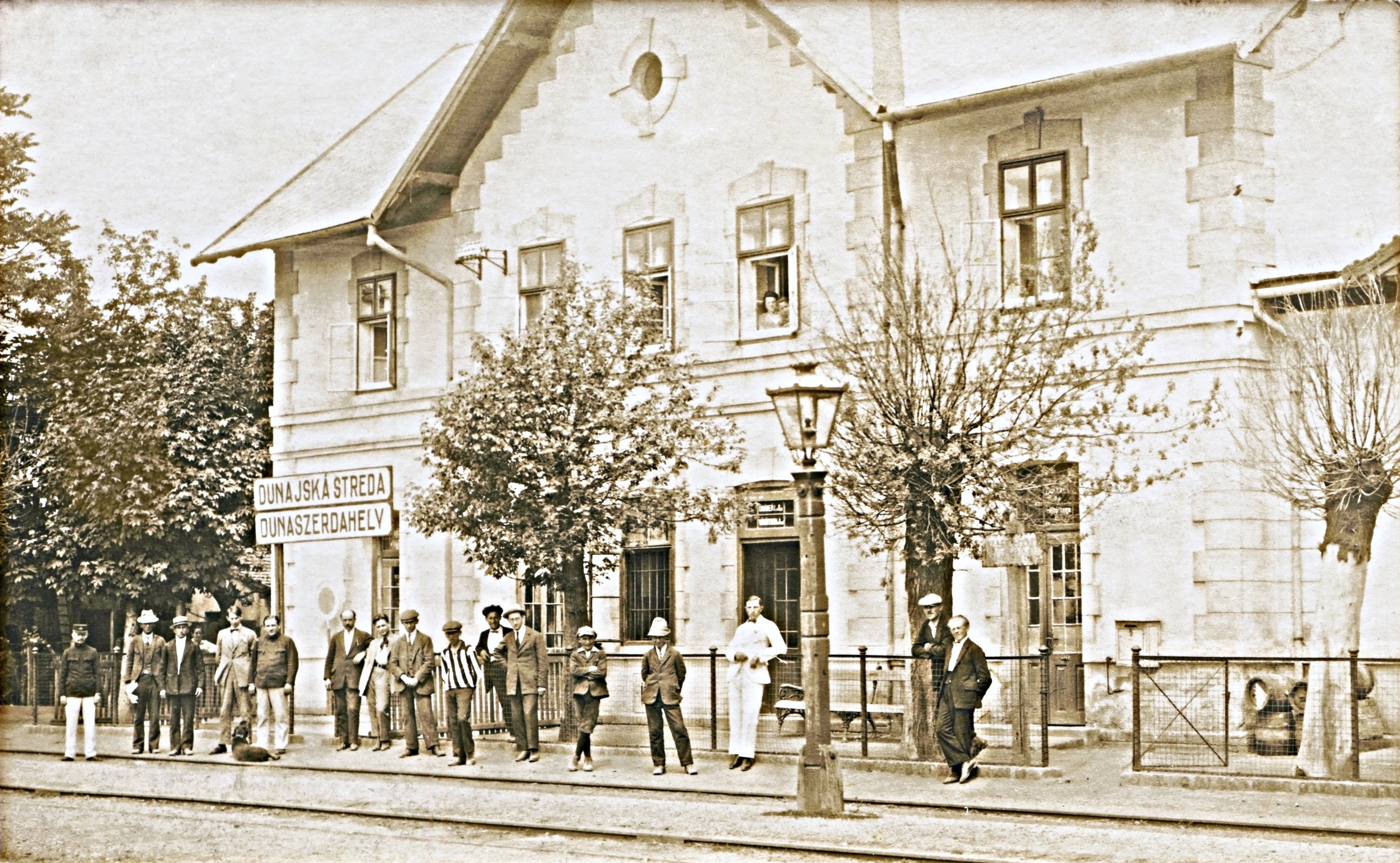
A sepia photo of the city's train station from the early 1930s featuring a bilingual place sign

== Coat of arms ==
The 19th-century seal of the market town depicted St Peter with the inscription "Sigillum Oppidi Szerdahely". According to tradition, the old coat-of-arms of the town depicted this figure in blue clothes, in a green field, on a silver shield, but it is disputed whether it was a real coat-of-arms or only a seal symbol. In 1910, the town applied to the State Municipality Registration Committee for a new seal without any picture (inscription: "Pozsony vármegye Dunaszerdahely község 1910"). After that, the St Peter figure was finally dropped from the municipal symbols.

The modern symbol of the town is a talking coat-of-arms: "a split shield with the right field five times divided by blue and gold and with the left red field with the gold sign of Wednesday (Mercurius’ symbol)." The six stripes on the right symbolize the six villages amalgamated in the course of history to compose the modern town. The blue and gold colours refer to the river Danube and the large wheatfields of the region. The antique Mercurius/Wednesday symbol refers to the old Wednesday markets, which gave the name of the town.

== Population ==
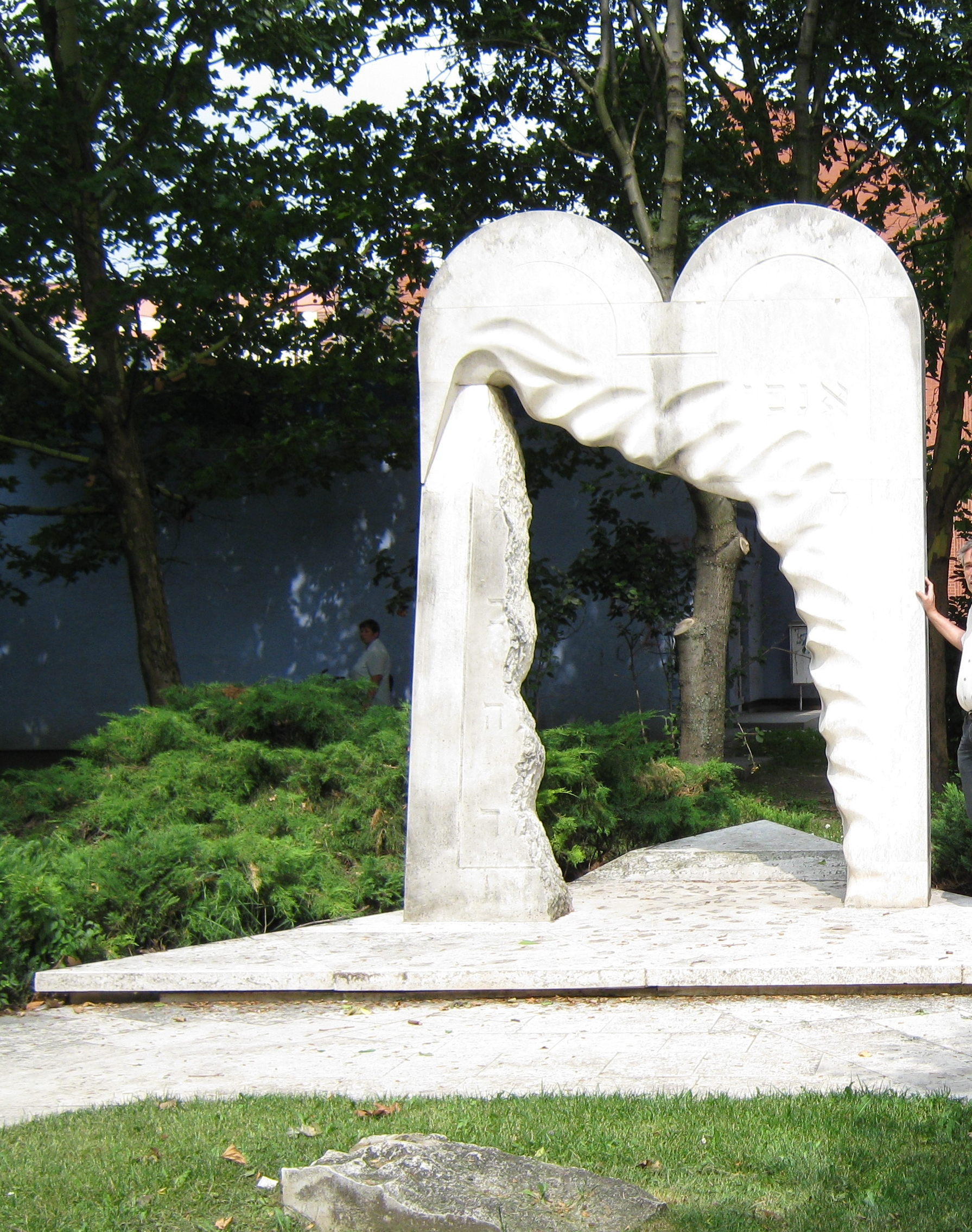
The Jewish Holocaust memorial in the center of the town. Before the Holocaust, about half of the town's population was Jewish. The memorial is shaped as a torn out Tablets of Stone, and was erected where the main town's synagogue was located.

Historical population
Year	Pop.	±%
1970	11,538	—
1980	18,715	+62.2%
1991	23,236	+24.2%
2001	23,519	+1.2%
2011	22,477	−4.4%
2021	23,044	+2.5%
Source: Censuses

Population statistic (10 years)
Year	1995	2005	2015	2025
Count	23,791	23,490	22,652	22,720
Difference		−1.26%	−3.56%	+0.30%

Population statistic
Year	2024	2025
Count	22,826	22,720
Difference		−0.46%

It has a population of 22,720 people (31 December 2025).

In 1910, 50.2% of the population was Roman Catholic, 43.6% Jewish, and 3.5% Calvinist.

=== Ethnicity ===
Census 2021 (1+%)
Ethnicity	Number	Fraction
Hungarian	17,156	74.44%
Slovak	4824	20.93%
Not found out	2012	8.73%
Romani	486	2.1%
Total	23,044	

In year 2021 was 23,044 people by ethnicity 17,156 as Hungarian, 4824 as Slovak, 2012 as Not found out, 486 as Romani, 127 as Czech, 87 as Other, 38 as Ukrainian, 38 as German, 36 as Russian, 31 as Vietnamese, 26 as Jewish, 18 as Polish, 11 as Chinese, 11 as Serbian, 11 as Rusyn, 10 as Romanian, 6 as Moravian, 5 as Iranian, 5 as Greek, 5 as Bulgarian, 4 as Italian, 4 as Austrian, 3 as Turkish, 3 as French, 3 as Albanian, 2 as English, 1 as Canadian and 1 as Croatian.

Note on population: The difference values of population numbers in the table "Population statistic" and in the sections "Ethnicity" & "Religion" is caused by the use of various statistical methods.

=== Religion ===
Census 2021 (1+%)
Religion	Number	Fraction
Roman Catholic Church	12,929	56.11%
None	5391	23.39%
Not found out	2109	9.15%
Calvinist Church	1472	6.39%
Evangelical Church	416	1.81%
Total	23,044	

In year 2021 was 23,044 people by religion 12,929 from Roman Catholic Church, 5391 from None, 2109 from Not found out, 1472 from Calvinist Church, 416 from Evangelical Church, 195 from Greek Catholic Church, 127 from Christian Congregations in Slovakia, 61 from Jehovah's Witnesses, 60 from Eastern Orthodox Church, 56 from Other and not ascertained christian church, 44 from Other, 39 from Jewish community, 37 from Buddhism, 26 from Islam, 23 from Ad hoc movements, 16 from Apostolic Church, 15 from Old Catholic Church, 12 from United Methodist Church, 8 from Baptists Church, 7 from Paganism and natural spirituality and 1 from Church of Jesus Christ of Latter-day Saints.

== Education ==
There are Slovak and Hungarian language secondary schools in the town, called Gymnázium Ladislava Dúbravu, Magyar Tanítási Nyelvű Magángimnázium, and Vámbéry Ármin Magyar Tanítási Nyelvű Gimnázium.

== Ethnic tensions ==
In June 1887, the synagogue was set on fire, and 64 more Jewish buildings in the city. In the same year, the Jewish quarter was sacked, and delinquents attacked Jews in the street and their homes. Not until military units were alerted did the attacks stop. The damage was heavy, and about 80 Jewish families were left homeless.

In May 1944, Jewish males under the age of 48 were drafted to work squads in different areas. On that same date, the order to establish a ghetto in Dunajska Streda was issued. Three streets on the Eastern side of the synagogue were set aside for the Jewish population. Within 48 hours, all the Jews in town had to leave their houses and move into the ghetto that was run by officers of the Hungarian army. Immediately upon leaving their houses, army personnel and town residents broke into them and looted the possessions that were left behind. In the middle of May 1944, Jews from about 70 towns, including Samorin and Magendorf, were sent to the ghetto too. On June 8, 1944, came the announcement of the evacuation from the ghetto. The first stage was assembling all the Jews in the synagogue building and courtyard, and several days later, the actual deportation began.

A 2008 football match between FC Dunajska Streda and Slovan Bratislava was disrupted by Slovak riot police after only 15 minutes, injuring more than 60 people, many of whom lost consciousness or suffered injuries, including concussion and broken jaws. Local policemen stormed Hungarian nationals, who were at the game to support the home team and to protest the burning of a Hungarian flag at an earlier game. flags with Árpád stripes were being waved, and the home crowd sang the Hungarian national anthem before kickoff. Press reports from the scene said that the police failed to act against Bratislava supporters who were throwing smoke bombs, noise grenades, and other missiles on the pitch. Based on videos posted on the internet showing the incident from various angles, the supporters were not doing anything that would warrant such an intervention by the police. Five days after the game, the Slovak police presented a photo as evidence, showing one of the supporters raising his fist to throw a punch, but police officers can not be seen in the image. Spontaneous demonstrations were held in Budapest at the embassy and the consulate of Slovakia on the night of the incident. Protesters lit candles to honor the victims and burned a Slovak flag.

== Famous people ==
- Ármin Vámbéry (1832–1913), orientalist
- Ján Ďurica (born 1981), footballer
- Slávka Halčáková (born 1974), actress
- István Sarlay (1894–1962), Lieutenant Colonel, First World War hero /battles in Bosnia-Hercegovina/, awarded by Signum Laudis with swords /Military Merit Medal (Austria-Hungary)/, Silver Medal of Bravery 1st Class, Silver Medal of Bravery 2nd Class, Bronze Medal of Bravery, Karl-Cross, Wound Medal (Austria-Hungary) /2x wounded/ etc.
- Andrew Steiner (1908–2009), Czechoslovak-American architect
- Herman Steiner (1905–1955), United States Chess Champion, 1948–1950
- Dajana Filistovová (1984–Present) European Mixed Table Tennis Championship Winner 2001 and 3-time bronze medalist.
- Yehuda Aszód (1796–1866), Hungarian rabbi and halakhist

== Climate ==
Dunajská Streda has a humid continental climate (Köppen: Dfb).

Climate data for Dunajska Streda
Month	Jan	Feb	Mar	Apr	May	Jun	Jul	Aug	Sep	Oct	Nov	Dec	Year
Mean daily maximum °C (°F)	3.3 (37.9)	6.5 (43.7)	11.4 (52.5)	17.3 (63.1)	21.7 (71.1)	26.0 (78.8)	28.1 (82.6)	27.6 (81.7)	22.2 (72.0)	16.2 (61.2)	9.8 (49.6)	4.2 (39.6)	16.2 (61.2)
Daily mean °C (°F)	0.6 (33.1)	3.0 (37.4)	6.8 (44.2)	12.1 (53.8)	16.7 (62.1)	20.8 (69.4)	22.6 (72.7)	22.0 (71.6)	17.0 (62.6)	11.7 (53.1)	6.7 (44.1)	1.8 (35.2)	11.8 (53.3)
Mean daily minimum °C (°F)	−2.0 (28.4)	−0.3 (31.5)	2.3 (36.1)	6.8 (44.2)	11.5 (52.7)	15.4 (59.7)	17.1 (62.8)	16.7 (62.1)	12.4 (54.3)	7.9 (46.2)	3.9 (39.0)	−0.6 (30.9)	7.6 (45.7)
Average precipitation mm (inches)	37.9 (1.49)	36.3 (1.43)	39.1 (1.54)	39.0 (1.54)	71.3 (2.81)	68.6 (2.70)	60.2 (2.37)	70.6 (2.78)	72.5 (2.85)	51.1 (2.01)	44.9 (1.77)	41.9 (1.65)	633.4 (24.94)
Source: Weather.Directory

== Twin towns – sister cities ==
Dunajská Streda is twinned with:

- Berehove, Ukraine
- Dalaman, Turkey
- Gödöllő, Hungary
- Győr, Hungary
- Jimbolia, Romania
- Jindřichův Hradec, Czech Republic
- Odorheiu Secuiesc, Romania
- Senta, Serbia
- Subotica, Serbia

== See also ==
- List of municipalities and towns in Slovakia

== Genealogical resources ==
The records for genealogical research are available at the state archive "Statny Archiv in Bratislava, Slovakia"

- Roman Catholic church records (births/marriages/deaths): 1673-1942 (parish A)
- Lutheran church records (births/marriages/deaths): 1823-1946 (parish A)
- Reformed church records (births/marriages/deaths): 1783-1926 (parish B)
