= DAC Aréna =

Football stadium in Dunajská Streda, Slovakia

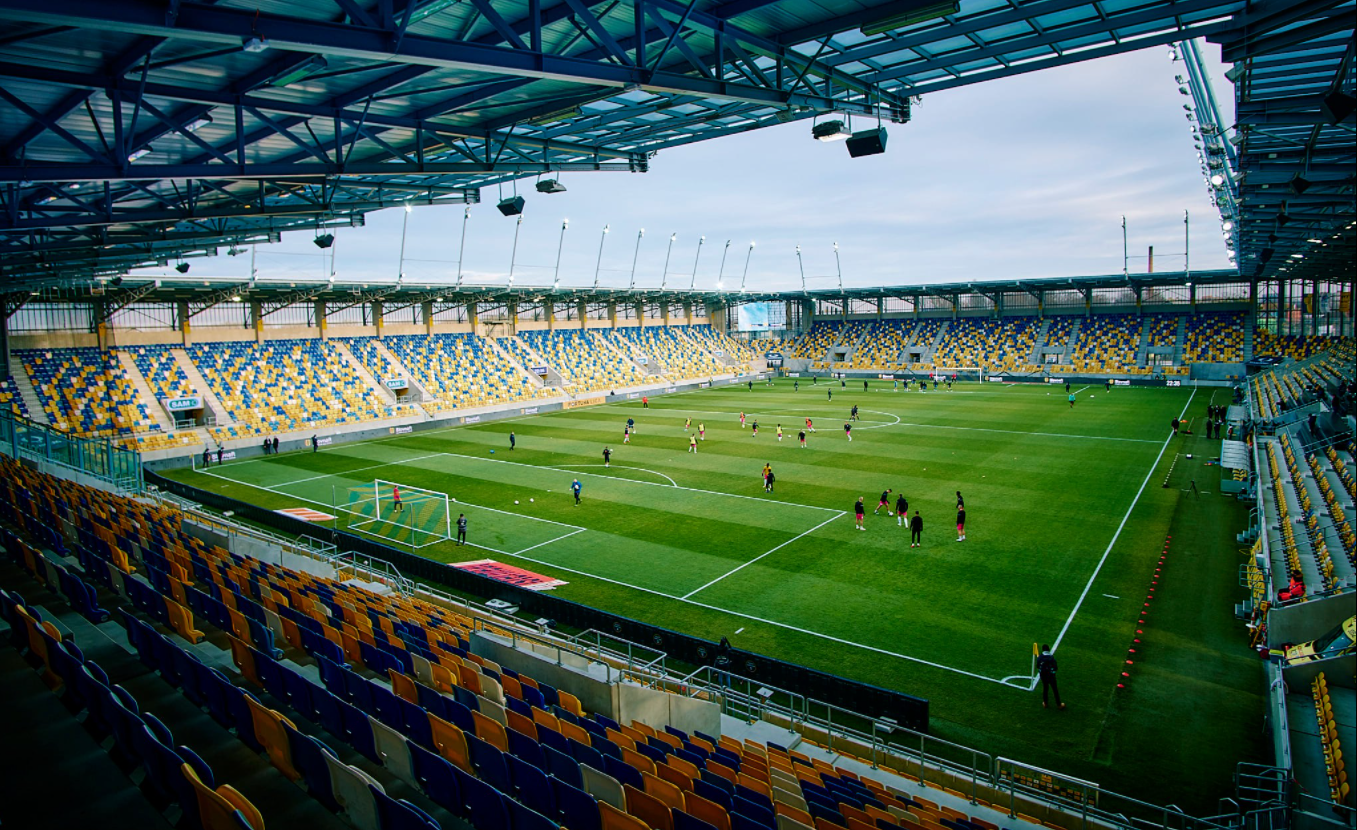
- UEFA
- Interactive map of DAC Aréna
- Former names: Mestský štadión (1953–2016); DAC Aréna (2016–2017); MOL Aréna (2017–present)
- Location: Športová ulica 18 Dunajská Streda, Slovakia
- Coordinates: 47°59′56.8″N 17°37′08.8″E
- Owner: DAC Aréna, a.s.
- Operator: DAC 1904 Dunajská Streda
- Capacity: 12,700
- Surface: Grass
- Record attendance: 15,572 (D.Streda vs Bayern Munich, 1988)
- Field size: 105 x 68 m

Construction
- Opened: 1953
- Renovated: 2015–2019
- Cost: €22 million (2015–2019)
- Architect: Csaba Ambrus (ADIF)

Tenants
- DAC 1904 Dunajská Streda; UEFA U-21 Championship (2025)

Website
- www.fcdac.sk

MOL Aréna is a football stadium in Dunajská Streda, Slovakia. It is the home ground of a local club FC DAC 1904 Dunajská Streda and has an all-seated capacity of 12,700 people. The intensity of the floodlighting is 1,800 lux.

In European competitions, the stadium is known as DAC Aréna due to advertising rules.

== History ==
The stadium was opened in 1953. The main stand was built in the first half of the 1980s and was inaugurated for the 1985 Spartakiad. The capacity was 16,410 spectators. The stadium underwent reconstruction in 2008, when DAC 1904 Dunajská Streda started to play in Corgoň Liga.

In the 2016-17 league season, DAC drew an average home attendance of 4,112, the highest in the league.

== 2016–2019 reconstruction ==
The old stadium was replaced with a new, modern arena with a capacity of 12,700 spectators between 2016 and 2019.

The old stands (except the main stand) were demolished in spring 2016. The construction of a new stadium began in June 2016. In the beginning two new stands were built. The main construction works were finished in September. The stadium was ready for matches of the Slovak football league in November. Current members of Toldy Construct team also contributed to this project. They helped to realize specialised construction and design elements of the facade and roof.

Afterwards, the main stand with dressing rooms, VIP and press rooms, fanshop, club museum and a restaurant was constructed.

Finally, the last stand was constructed which replaced the old main stand. The arena was finished in January 2019.

The new arena has a 4-star UEFA standard, so it can be used for international matches.

=== Owners ===
DAC Arena is owned by EHCS Group (51.9%), city of Dunajská Streda (25.6%) and MOL (22.5%)

=== Name ===
MOL Arena is the name of the stadium from season 2017-18 because MOL Group is the main partner of the stadium.

=== Cost ===
The cost of the reconstruction was €22 million. First phase cost €11 million, Slovak government provided €2.4 million of the cost. City of Dunajská Streda provided €2 million, MOL provided €2 million.

== International matches ==
DAC Aréna has hosted two friendly matches of the Slovakia national football team.

30 March 1993 Friendly	Slovakia	2–2	Lithuania	Dunajská Streda, Slovakia
	Ľubomír Luhový 27'; Pavol Diňa 55' (pen.)	Report	Ricardas Zdancius 41', 71'	Stadium: Mestský štadión Dunajská Streda; Attendance: 2,000; Referee: Karol Ihring

1 June 2026 Friendly	Slovakia	2-1	Malta	Dunajská Streda, Slovakia
18:00 UTC+2	Haraslín 9'; Galčík 97'	Report	Mbong 37'	Stadium: MOL Aréna; Attendance: 5,721; Referee: Mihály Káprály (Hungary)

== Image gallery ==
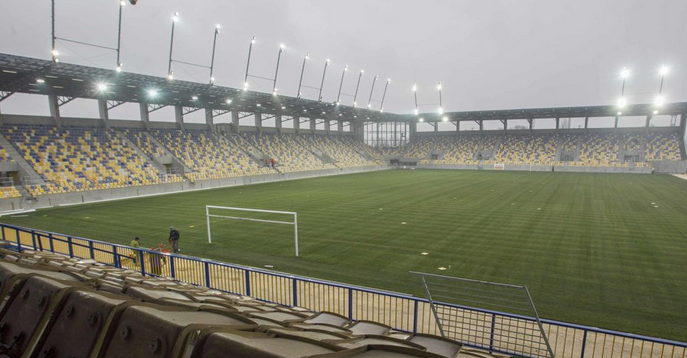
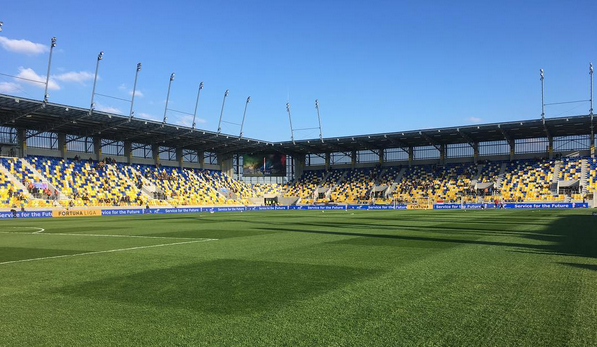
