= 2023–24 ŠK Slovan Bratislava season =

Slovan Bratislava
2023–24 season
- Chairman: Ivan Kmotrík
- Head coach: Vladimír Weiss
- Stadium: Tehelné pole
- Slovak 1st League: 1st
- Slovak Cup: Quarter-finals
- UEFA Champions League: Third qualifying round
- UEFA Europa League: Play-off round
- UEFA Europa Conference League: Knockout round play-offs
- Top goalscorer: League: Tigran Barseghyan (15); All: Tigran Barseghyan (13)
- Highest home attendance: 21,544 v Lille; 9 November 2023 (UEFA Europa Conference League)
- Lowest home attendance: 1,620 v Podbrezová; 13 March 2024 (Slovak Cup)
- Average home league attendance: 5,783
- Biggest win: 7–0 v Svätý Jur; 13 September 2023 (Slovak Cup)
- Biggest defeat: 2–6 v Aris Limassol; 31 August 2023 (UEFA Europa League)
Home colours	Away colours	Third colours

The 2023–24 season was ŠK Slovan Bratislava's 18th consecutive in the top flight of Slovak football, where they competed as five-time defending champions.

In addition to the domestic league, Slovan also competed in this season's edition of the Slovak Cup. As the league champions from the previous season, Slovan qualified for the UEFA Champions League.

The season covered the period from 1 June 2023 to 31 May 2024.

== Players ==
As of 4 September 2023

Squad No.	Name	Nationality	Position(s)	Date of birth (age)	Signed from / Previous club	Since
Goalkeepers
31	Martin Trnovský	(Slovakia)	GK	7 June 2000 (age 26)	Youth system	2019
35	Adam Hrdina	(Slovakia)	GK	12 February 2004 (age 22)	Youth system	2022
82	Milan Borjan	(Canada) (Serbia)	GK	23 October 1987 (age 39)	(Serbia) Red Star Belgrade (loan)	2023
Defenders
4	Guram Kashia	(Georgia (country))	CB	4 July 1987 (age 39)	(Georgia (country)) Locomotive Tbilisi	2021
5	Richard Križan	(Slovakia)	CB	23 September 1997 (age 29)	(Slovakia) Trenčín	2021
6	Kevin Wimmer	(Austria)	CB	15 November 1992 (age 33)	(Austria) Rapid Wien	2023
12	Kenan Bajrić	(Slovenia)	CB / DM	20 December 1994 (age 31)	(Slovenia) Olimpija Ljubljana	2018
25	Lukáš Pauschek	(Slovakia)	RB / LB	9 December 1992 (age 33)	(Czech Republic) Mladá Boleslav	2019
27	Matúš Vojtko	(Slovakia)	LB	5 October 2000 (age 26)	(Slovakia) Zemplín Michalovce	2021
28	César Blackman	(Panama)	RB / RW	2 April 1998 (age 28)	(Slovakia) DAC Dunajská Streda	2023
36	Lucas Lovat	(Brazil)	LB	15 January 1997 (age 29)	(Slovakia) Spartak Trnava	2020
—	Siemen Voet (out on loan at (Netherlands) Fortuna Sittard)	(Belgium)	CB	3 February 2000 (age 26)	(Netherlands) PEC Zwolle	2022
Midfielders
3	Uche Agbo	(Nigeria)	DM / CM / CB	4 December 1995 (age 30)	(Spain) Deportivo La Coruña	2021
7	Vladimír Weiss Jr. (captain)	(Slovakia)	CAM / LW / RW	30 November 1989 (age 36)	(Qatar) Al-Gharafa	2020
8	Jaromír Zmrhal	(Czech Republic)	LW / RW / LB	2 August 1993 (age 33)	(Italy) Brescia	2021
11	Tigran Barseghyan	(Armenia)	RW / LW	22 September 1993 (age 33)	(Kazakhstan) Astana	2022
18	Nino Marcelli	(Slovakia)	RW / LW	29 May 2005 (age 21)	Youth system	2023
20	Jaba Kankava	(Georgia (country))	DM / CM	18 March 1986 (age 40)	(France) Valenciennes	2021
24	Marko Tolić	(Croatia)	CAM / LW / RW	5 July 1996 (age 30)	(Croatia) Dinamo Zagreb (loan)	2023
26	Filip Lichý	(Slovakia)	CM / DM / CB	25 January 2001 (age 25)	Youth system	2020
33	Juraj Kucka	(Slovakia)	DM / CM	26 February 1987 (age 39)	(Italy) Parma	2022
88	Kyriakos Savvidis	(Greece)	DM / CM	20 June 1995 (age 31)	(Slovakia) Spartak Trnava	2023
Forwards
13	David Strelec	(Slovakia)	ST	4 April 2001 (age 25)	(Italy) Spezia (loan)	2023
15	Abubakari Malik	(Ghana)	ST	10 May 2000 (age 26)	(Sweden) Malmö FF (loan)	2023
23	Sharani Zuberu	(Ghana)	LW / RW / ST	7 January 2000 (age 26)	(Ghana) Dreams (loan)	2023
77	Aleksandar Čavrić	(Serbia)	RW / ST	18 May 1994 (age 32)	(Belgium) Genk	2016
—	Adler Da Silva (out on loan at (Poland) Stal Rzeszów)	(Switzerland) (Brazil)	ST / CAM	28 December 1998 (age 27)	(Slovakia) Pohronie	2022
—	Ivan Šaponjić (out on loan at (Turkey) Ümraniyespor)	(Serbia)	ST	2 August 1997 (age 29)	(Spain) Atlético Madrid	2022

== Transfers and loans ==
=== Transfers in ===
Date	Position	Nationality	Name	From / Previous club	Fee	Ref.
4 June 2023	MF	(Greece)	Kyriakos Savvidis	(Slovakia) Spartak Trnava	Free transfer	
8 June 2023	DF	(Austria)	Kevin Wimmer	(Austria) Rapid Wien	Free transfer	
14 June 2023	DF	(Panama)	César Blackman	(Slovakia) DAC Dunajská Streda	Free transfer	
30 June 2023	DF	(Slovenia)	Kenan Bajrić	(Cyprus) Pafos	Loan return	
30 June 2023	FW	(Nigeria)	Ezekiel Henty	(Cyprus) Apollon Limassol	Loan return	
30 June 2023	FW	(Serbia)	Ivan Šaponjić	(Turkey) Bandırmaspor	Loan return	
30 June 2023	DF	(Slovakia)	Matúš Vojtko	(Croatia) Gorica	Loan return	

=== Loans in ===
Start date	Position	Nationality	Name	From	End date	Ref.
22 June 2023	MF	(Croatia)	Marko Tolić	(Croatia) Dinamo Zagreb	30 June 2024	
4 July 2023	GK	(Canada)	Milan Borjan	(Serbia) Red Star Belgrade	30 June 2024	
9 August 2023	FW	(Slovakia)	David Strelec	(Italy) Spezia	30 June 2024	

=== Transfers out ===
Date	Position	Nationality	Name	To / Next club	Fee	Ref.
5 June 2023	DF	(Slovakia)	David Hrnčár	(Belgium) Beveren	Undisclosed	
6 June 2023	FW	(Slovenia)	Žan Medved	(Slovakia) Košice	Free transfer	
21 June 2023	DF	(Czech Republic)	Jurij Medveděv	(Russia) Sochi	Free transfer	
30 June 2023	MF	(Georgia (country))	Giorgi Chakvetadze	(Belgium) Gent	End of loan	
1 July 2023	DF	(Slovakia)	Vernon De Marco	End of contract		
5 July 2023	DF	(Slovakia)	Vernon De Marco	(United Arab Emirates) Hatta	Free transfer	
1 July 2023	MF	(England)	Andre Green	End of contract		
2 August 2023	MF	(England)	Andre Green	(England) Rotherham United	Free transfer	
1 July 2023	MF	(Hungary)	Dávid Holman	End of contract		
24 July 2023	MF	(Hungary)	Dávid Holman	(Hungary) Budapest Honvéd	Free transfer	
30 June 2023	DF	(The Gambia)	Maudo Jarjué	(Sweden) IF Elfsborg	End of loan	
1 July 2023	GK	(Slovakia)	Michal Šulla	End of contract		
28 September 2023	GK	(Slovakia)	Michal Šulla	(Slovakia) Spartak Trnava	Free transfer	
21 July 2023	GK	(Slovakia)	Adrián Chovan	(Greece) Panserraikos	Free transfer	
11 August 2023	FW	(Nigeria)	Ezekiel Henty	(Cyprus) AEL Limassol	€60,000 (Note: Unofficial fee.)	

=== Loans out ===
Start date	Position	Nationality	Name	To	End date	Ref.
24 August 2023	FW	(Serbia)	Ivan Šaponjić	(Turkey) Ümraniyespor	30 June 2024	
1 September 2023	DF	(Belgium)	Siemen Voet	(Netherlands) Fortuna Sittard	30 June 2024	
4 September 2023	FW	(Switzerland)	Adler Da Silva	(Poland) Stal Rzeszów	30 June 2024	

== Friendlies ==
Win Draw Loss

=== Pre-season ===
Slovan announced their pre-season program on 2 June 2023.

Saturday, 24 June 2023	Slovan Bratislava (Slovakia)	3–0	(Romania) Universitatea Cluj	Schörfling am Attersee, Austria
17:00 CEST (UTC+02:00)	Barseghyan 21', 40'; Malik 54'	Report		Stadium: Sportplaz SK Kammer

Tuesday, 27 June 2023	Slovan Bratislava (Slovakia)	2–1	(Slovenia) Olimpija Ljubljana	Bruck an der Mur, Austria
16:30 CEST (UTC+02:00)	Malik 16'; Zmrhal 27'	Report	Florucz 88'	Stadium: Murinsel Stadion

Saturday, 1 July 2023	Slovan Bratislava (Slovakia)	2–0	(Poland) Wisła Płock	Šamorín, Slovakia
17:30 CEST (UTC+02:00)	Čavrić 51'; Marcelli 82'	Report		Stadium: x-bionic sphere

Wednesday, 5 July 2023	Slovan Bratislava (Slovakia)	4–1	(Romania) Rapid București	Šamorín, Slovakia
17:30 CEST (UTC+02:00)	Tolić 7'; Zuberu 49'; Wimmer 63'; Kucka 83'	Report	Oaidă 74'	Stadium: x-bionic sphere

== Competition overview ==
Competition	First match	Last match	Starting round	Final position	Record							
Competition	First match	Last match	Starting round	Final position	Pld	W	D	L	GF	GA	GD	Win %
Slovak First Football League	29 July 2023	18 May 2024	Matchday 1	1st	32	23	4	5	76	31	+45	71.88
Slovak Cup	13 September 2023	13 March 2024	Second round	Quarter-finals	5	4	0	1	15	4	+11	80.00
Champions League	12 July 2023	15 August 2023	First qualifying round	Third qualifying round	6	2	2	2	8	8	+0	33.33
Europa League	24 August 2023	31 August 2023	Play-off round	Play-off round	2	1	0	1	4	7	−3	50.00
Europa Conference League	21 September 2023	22 February 2024	Group stage	Knockout round play-offs	8	3	1	4	9	12	−3	37.50
Total					53	33	7	13	112	62	+50	62.26

Source: Competitions

== Niké liga ==
=== League table ===
==== Regular stage ====
Pos	Team	Pld	W	D	L	GF	GA	GD	Pts	Qualification
1	Slovan Bratislava	22	18	3	1	57	16	+41	57	Qualification for the championship group
2	Žilina	22	12	5	5	40	30	+10	41	Qualification for the championship group
3	Spartak Trnava	22	12	3	7	31	22	+9	39	Qualification for the championship group
4	DAC Dunajská Streda	22	10	7	5	31	21	+10	37	Qualification for the championship group
5	Podbrezová	22	10	4	8	40	34	+6	34 (Note: Ranked on head-to-head points: Podbrezová 11, Ružomberok 9, Trenčín 8, Dukla Banská Bystrica 3.)	Qualification for the championship group
6	Ružomberok	22	9	7	6	28	31	−3	34	Qualification for the championship group

Source: Niké liga (in Slovak)
Rules for classification: 1) Points; 2) Head-to-head points; 3) Head-to-head goal difference; 4) Head-to-head away goals scored; 5) Play-off.

==== Championship group ====
Pos	Team	Pld	W	D	L	GF	GA	GD	Pts	Qualification	SLO	DAC	TRN	ŽIL	RUŽ	POD
1	Slovan Bratislava (C)	32	23	4	5	76	31	+45	73	Qualification for the Champions League first qualifying round	—	0–0	0–2	2–3	5–1	2–1
2	DAC Dunajská Streda	32	16	10	6	49	32	+17	58	Qualification for the Conference League second qualifying round	5–3	—	1–0	2–1	0–0	3–1
3	Spartak Trnava	32	18	3	11	47	29	+18	57	Qualification for the Conference League second qualifying round	1–2	3–0	—	1–0	1–0	5–0
4	Žilina	32	16	7	9	54	45	+9	55		0–3	2–3	2–0	—	0–0	3–2
5	Ružomberok	32	12	11	9	38	43	−5	47	Qualification for the Europa League first qualifying round (Note: Ružomberok qualified for the Europa League first qualifying round by winning the 2023–24 Slovak Cup.)	0–1	1–1	2–1	1–1	—	3–2
6	Podbrezová	32	11	4	17	49	60	−11	37		2–1	0–3	0–2	1–2	0–2	—

Source: Niké liga (in Slovak)
Legend: Blue = home team win; Yellow = draw; Red = away team win.
Rules for classification: 1) Points; 2) Head-to-head points; 3) Head-to-head goal difference; 4) Head-to-head away goals scored; 5) Play-off.
(C) Champions

=== Results summary ===
Overall								Home						Away					
Pld	W	D	L	GF	GA	GD	Pts	W	D	L	GF	GA	GD	W	D	L	GF	GA	GD
32	23	4	5	76	31	+45	73	11	3	2	38	16	+22	12	1	3	38	15	+23

=== Results by matchday ===
Round	1	2	3	6	7	8	5	9	10	11	12	4	13	14	15	16	17	18	19	20	21	22	23	24	25	26	27	28	29	30	31	32
Ground	A	H	A	H	A	H	A	A	H	A	H	H	A	H	A	H	A	H	A	H	A	H	A	H	H	A	H	A	A	H	A	H
Result	D	D	W	W	L	W	W	W	W	W	W	W	W	W	W	D	W	W	W	W	W	W	W	L	W	W	D	W	L	L	L	W
Position	5	7	5	6	6	6	6	4	2	1	1	1	1	1	1	1	1	1	1	1	1	1	1	1	1	1	1	1	1	1	1	1
Points	1	2	5	8	8	11	14	17	20	23	26	29	32	35	38	39	42	45	48	51	54	57	60	60	63	66	67	70	70	70	70	73

A = Away; H = Home; W = Win; D = Draw; L = Loss

=== Matches ===
Regular stage

Saturday, 29 July 2023 1	Košice	0–0	Slovan Bratislava	Košice
20:30 CEST (UTC+02:00)		Report		Stadium: Košická futbalová aréna Attendance: 5,836

Saturday, 5 August 2023 2	Slovan Bratislava	2–2	Dukla Banská Bystrica	Bratislava
18:00 CEST (UTC+02:00)	Tolić 37'; Weiss Jr. (penalty missed) 45+3'; Malik 50'	Report	Arevalo 11'; Záhumenský 87'	Stadium: Tehelné pole Attendance: 6,540

Saturday, 12 August 2023 3	Skalica	1–2	Slovan Bratislava	Skalica
18:00 CEST (UTC+02:00)	Podhorín 60'	Report	Marcelli 21'; Barseghyan 40'	Stadium: Štadión MFK Skalica; Attendance: 3,000

Sunday, 3 September 2023 6	Slovan Bratislava	3–2	Podbrezová	Bratislava
18:00 CEST (UTC+02:00)	Barseghyan 22', 90+4'; Kashia 90+2'	Report	Assinor 78'; Bartoš 87'	Stadium: Tehelné pole Attendance: 3,422

Sunday, 17 September 2023 7	DAC Dunajská Streda	3–1	Slovan Bratislava	Dunajská Streda
17:30 CEST (UTC+02:00)	Gouré 11'; Čermák 30'; Gavrić 57'	Report	Strelec 60'	Stadium: MOL Aréna; Attendance: 8,866

Sunday, 24 September 2023 8	Slovan Bratislava	2–0	Žilina	Bratislava
17:30 CEST (UTC+02:00)	Strelec 42'; Barseghyan 47'	Report		Stadium: Tehelné pole Attendance: 4,757

Wednesday, 27 September 2023 5	Ružomberok	1–2	Slovan Bratislava	Ružomberok
18:00 CEST (UTC+02:00)	Chrien 65'; Mrva (yellow card) 49' (yellow-red card) 68'	Report	Čavrić 58'; Strelec 75'	Stadium: Štadión pod Čebraťom; Attendance: 2,677

Sunday, 1 October 2023 9	Zlaté Moravce	0–3	Slovan Bratislava	Zlaté Moravce
18:00 CEST (UTC+02:00)		Report	Zmrhal 2'; Tolić 47', 75'	Stadium: ViOn Aréna; Attendance: 3,853

Sunday, 8 October 2023 10	Slovan Bratislava	2–0	Trenčín	Bratislava
18:00 CEST (UTC+02:00)	Pauschek 22'; Čavrić 71'	Report		Stadium: Tehelné pole Attendance: 6,283

Sunday, 22 October 2023 11	Spartak Trnava	1–2	Slovan Bratislava	Trnava
17:30 CEST (UTC+02:00)	Zeljković 66'	Report	Čavrić 64'; Lovat 76'	Stadium: Štadión Antona Malatinského; Attendance: 12,528

Sunday, 29 October 2023 12	Slovan Bratislava	4–0	Košice	Bratislava
18:00 CET (UTC+01:00)	Strelec 6'; Barseghyan 9'; Kucka 14'; Čavrić 48' (pen.)	Report		Stadium: Tehelné pole Attendance: 6,250

Wednesday, 1 November 2023 4	Slovan Bratislava	5–1	Zemplín Michalovce	Bratislava
15:00 CET (UTC+01:00)	Marcelli 4', 23'; Čavrić 16', 80'; Marjanović 31' (o.g.)	Report	van Kessel 8'	Stadium: Tehelné pole Attendance: 3,427

Saturday, 4 November 2023 13	Dukla Banská Bystrica	1–4	Slovan Bratislava	Banská Bystrica
15:00 CET (UTC+01:00)	Uhrinčať 10'	Report	Čavrić 30'; Marcelli 48', 80'; Strelec 55'	Stadium: Štadión SNP; Attendance: 3,130

Sunday, 12 November 2023 14	Slovan Bratislava	1–0	Skalica	Bratislava
15:00 CET (UTC+01:00)	Tolić (yellow card) 16' (yellow-red card) 57'; Barseghyan 84'	Report		Stadium: Tehelné pole Attendance: 3,011

Saturday, 25 November 2023 15	Zemplín Michalovce	0–2	Slovan Bratislava	Michalovce
15:00 CET (UTC+01:00)		Report	Strelec 40'; Kucka 43'	Stadium: Mestský futbalový štadión Attendance: 1,208

Sunday, 3 December 2023 16	Slovan Bratislava	2–2	Ružomberok	Bratislava
17:30 CET (UTC+01:00)	Tolić 31'; Strelec 58'	Report	Múdry 25'; Chrien 38'	Stadium: Tehelné pole Attendance: 2,329

Saturday, 9 December 2023 17	Podbrezová	0–6	Slovan Bratislava	Podbrezová
15:00 CET (UTC+01:00)		Report	Kováčik 15' (o.g.); Čavrić 18', 51' (pen.); Blackman 25'; Barseghyan 31' (pen.); Strelec 84'	Stadium: ZELPO Aréna; Attendance: 1,746

Sunday, 17 December 2023 18	Slovan Bratislava	2–1	DAC Dunajská Streda	Bratislava
17:30 CET (UTC+01:00)	Tolić 24', 61'	Report	Trusa 44'	Stadium: Tehelné pole Attendance: 4,789

Friday, 9 February 2024 19	Žilina	0–4	Slovan Bratislava	Žilina
17:30 CET (UTC+01:00)		Report	Barseghyan 9'; Weiss ml. 36'; Kankava 82'; Rodrigues 90'	Stadium: Štadión pod Dubňom; Attendance: 4,235

Sunday, 18 February 2024 20	Slovan Bratislava	4–1	Zlaté Moravce	Bratislava
15:00 CET (UTC+01:00)	Kucka 15'; Rodrigues 30', 73'; Marcelli 55'	Report	Balaj 72'	Stadium: Tehelné pole Attendance: 3,168

Sunday, 25 February 2024 21	Trenčín	0–2	Slovan Bratislava	Trenčín
15:00 CET (UTC+01:00)		Report	Tolić 51'; Rodrigues 66'	Stadium: Štadión Sihoť; Attendance: 4,377

Saturday, 2 March 2024 22	Slovan Bratislava	2–0	Spartak Trnava	Bratislava
17:00 CET (UTC+01:00)	Weiss ml. 16'; Zmrhal 90'	Report		Stadium: Tehelné pole Attendance: 11,130

Championship group

Friday, 8 March 2024 23 / Championship group round 1	Ružomberok	0–1	Slovan Bratislava	Ružomberok
17:30 CET (UTC+01:00)		Report	Marcelli 45'	Stadium: Štadión pod Čebraťom; Attendance: 2,387

Sunday, 17 March 2024 24 / 2	Slovan Bratislava	0–2	Spartak Trnava	Bratislava
17:30 CET (UTC+01:00)		Report	Wimmer 21' (o.g.); Ďuriš 81'	Stadium: Tehelné pole Attendance: 10,050

Saturday, 30 March 2024 25 / 3	Slovan Bratislava	2–1	Podbrezová	Bratislava
17:30 CET (UTC+01:00)	Strelec 21'; Marcelli 90'	Report	Sanusi 43'	Stadium: Tehelné pole Attendance: 2,836

Friday, 5 April 2024 26 / 4	Žilina	0–3	Slovan Bratislava	Žilina
		Report		Stadium: Štadión pod Dubňom

Saturday, 13 April 2024 27 / 5	Slovan Bratislava	0–0	DAC Dunajská Streda	Bratislava
		Report		Stadium: Tehelné pole

Sunday, 21 April 2024 28 / 6	Spartak Trnava	1–2	Slovan Bratislava	Trnava
		Report		Stadium: Štadión Antona Malatinského

Sunday, 28 April 2024 29 / 7	DAC Dunajská Streda	5–3	Slovan Bratislava	Dunajská Streda
		Report		Stadium: MOL Aréna

Saturday, 4 May 2024 30 / 8	Slovan Bratislava	2–3	Žilina	Bratislava
		Report		Stadium: Tehelné pole

Saturday, 11 May 2024 31 / 9	Podbrezová	2–1	Slovan Bratislava	Podbrezová
		Report		Stadium: ZELPO Aréna

Saturday, 18 May 2024 32 / 10	Slovan Bratislava	5–1	Ružomberok	Bratislava
		Report		Stadium: Tehelné pole

== Slovak Cup ==
Wednesday, 13 September 2023 Second round	Svätý Jur (5)	0–7	Slovan Bratislava (1)	Svätý Jur
16:30 CEST (UTC+02:00)		Report	Strelec 4'; Križan 45', 55', 87'; Malik 61', 69'; Božík 74'	Stadium: Štadión ŠK Svätý Jur; Attendance: 1,354

Wednesday, 18 October 2023 Third round	Sereď (3)	1–3	Slovan Bratislava (1)	Sereď
15:00 CEST (UTC+02:00)	Remeň 18'	Report	Tolić 7'; Zuberu 16'; Malik 62'	Stadium: Štadión Sereď; Attendance: 700

Saturday, 18 November 2023 Fourth round	Slovan Galanta (3)	0–3	Slovan Bratislava (1)	Galanta
13:00 CET (UTC+01:00)		Report	Kankava 33'; Tolić 49'; Zmrhal 50'	Stadium: Štadión FC Slovan Galanta; Attendance: 2,150

Wednesday, 28 February 2024 Round of 16	Slovan Bratislava (1)	1–0	Žilina (1)	Bratislava
17:30 CET (UTC+01:00)	Rodrigues (penalty missed) 25'; Marcelli 66'	Report		Stadium: Tehelné pole Attendance: 2,273

Wednesday, 13 March 2024 Quarter-finals	Slovan Bratislava (1)	1–3	Podbrezová (1)	Bratislava
20:30 CET (UTC+01:00)	Barseghyan 33'; Rodrigues (yellow card) 76' (yellow-red card) 90+2'	Report	Faško 36'; Chyla 84'; Paraj 86'	Stadium: Tehelné pole Attendance: 1,620

== UEFA Champions League ==
=== First qualifying round ===
The draw for the first qualifying round was held on 20 June 2023.

Wednesday, 12 July 2023 First leg	Slovan Bratislava (Slovakia)	1–1	(Luxembourg) Swift Hesperange	Bratislava, Slovakia
20:30 CEST (UTC+02:00)	Weiss Jr. 25'; Kucka (red card) 45+6'	Report (UEFA); Report (Slovan)	Stolz 22' (pen.)	Stadium: Tehelné pole Attendance: 14,470; Referee: Viktor Kopiievskyi (Ukraine)

Wednesday, 19 July 2023 Second leg	Swift Hesperange (Luxembourg)	0–2 (1–3 agg.)	(Slovakia) Slovan Bratislava	Luxembourg City, Luxembourg
20:00 CEST (UTC+02:00)	Stolz (penalty missed) 10'	Report (UEFA); Report (Slovan)	Weiss Jr. 55' (pen.), 62' (pen.)	Stadium: Stade de Luxembourg (Note: Swift Hesperange played their home match at the Stade de Luxembourg in Luxembourg City, instead of their regular stadium, Stade Alphonse Theis, in Hesperange, which did not meet UEFA requirements.); Attendance: 3,054; Referee: Abdulkadir Bitigen (Turkey)

=== Second qualifying round ===
The draw for the second qualifying round was held on 21 June 2023.

Tuesday, 25 July 2023 First leg	Zrinjski Mostar (Bosnia and Herzegovina)	0–1	(Slovakia) Slovan Bratislava	Mostar, Bosnia and Herzegovina
21:00 CEST (UTC+02:00)		Report (UEFA); Report (Slovan)	Zuberu 53'	Stadium: Stadion pod Bijelim Brijegom; Attendance: 4,900; Referee: Bram Van Driessche (Belgium)

Tuesday, 1 August 2023 Second leg	Slovan Bratislava (Slovakia)	2–2 (3–2 agg.)	(Bosnia and Herzegovina) Zrinjski Mostar	Bratislava, Slovakia
20:30 CEST (UTC+02:00)	Čavrić 5'; Zuberu 66'	Report (UEFA); Report (Slovan)	Barišić 75'; Ivančić 90+3'	Stadium: Tehelné pole Attendance: 20,498; Referee: Jérémie Pignard (France)

=== Third qualifying round ===
The draw for the third qualifying round was held on 24 July 2023.

Wednesday, 9 August 2023 First leg	Slovan Bratislava (Slovakia)	1–2	(Israel) Maccabi Haifa	Bratislava, Slovakia
20:30 CEST (UTC+02:00)	Seck 12' (o.g.)	Report (UEFA); Report (Slovan)	Pierrot 5'; Saba 15'	Stadium: Tehelné pole Attendance: 21,375; Referee: Andris Treimanis (Latvia)

Tuesday, 15 August 2023 Second leg	Maccabi Haifa (Israel)	3–1 (5–2 agg.)	(Slovakia) Slovan Bratislava	Haifa, Israel
19:00 CEST (UTC+02:00)	Pierrot 29'; Saba 45+2'; David 90+3'	Report (UEFA); Report (Slovan)	Tolić 85'	Stadium: Sammy Ofer Stadium; Attendance: 29,000; Referee: Craig Pawson (England)

== UEFA Europa League ==
=== Play-off round ===
The draw for the play-off round was held on 7 August 2023.

Thursday, 24 August 2023 First leg	Slovan Bratislava (Slovakia)	2–1	(Cyprus) Aris Limassol	Bratislava, Slovakia
20:30 CEST (UTC+02:00)	Tolić 34'; Strelec 57'	Report (UEFA); Report (Slovan)	Mayambela 73'	Stadium: Tehelné pole Attendance: 17,564; Referee: William Collum (Scotland)

Thursday, 31 August 2023 Second leg	Aris Limassol (Cyprus)	6–2 (7–4 agg.)	(Slovakia) Slovan Bratislava	Limassol, Cyprus
19:00 CEST (UTC+02:00)	Gomis 21', 45+7', 51'; Szöke 24'; Mayambela 67'; Brown 72'	Report (UEFA); Report (Slovan)	Strelec 37'; Barseghyan 89'	Stadium: Alphamega Stadium; Attendance: 2,872; Referee: Erik Lambrechts (Belgium)

== UEFA Europa Conference League ==
=== Group stage ===
The draw for the group stage was held on 1 September 2023 with the fixtures announced on a day later.

Pos	Team	Pld	W	D	L	GF	GA	GD	Pts	Qualification	LOSC	SLO	LJU	KÍ
1	(France) Lille	6	4	2	0	10	2	+8	14	Advance to round of 16	—	2–1	2–0	3–0
2	(Slovakia) Slovan Bratislava	6	3	1	2	8	7	+1	10	Advance to knockout round play-offs	1–1	—	1–2	2–1
3	(Slovenia) Olimpija Ljubljana	6	2	0	4	4	9	−5	6		0–2	0–1	—	2–0
4	(Faroe Islands) KÍ	6	1	1	4	5	9	−4	4		0–0	1–2	3–0	—

Source: UEFA
Rules for classification: Group stage tiebreakers

==== Results by matchday ====
Round	1	2	3	4	5	6
Ground	H	A	A	H	A	H
Result	W	W	L	D	W	L
Position	2	1	2	2	2	2

A = Away; H = Home; W = Win; D = Draw; L = Loss

==== Matches ====
Thursday, 21 September 2023 1	Slovan Bratislava (Slovakia)	2–1	(Faroe Islands) KÍ	Bratislava, Slovakia
21:00 CEST (UTC+02:00)	Weiss Jr. 54'; Čavrić 74'	Report (UEFA); Report (Slovan)	Pavlović 48'	Stadium: Tehelné pole Attendance: 12,454; Referee: Christian-Petru Ciochirca (Austria)

Thursday, 5 October 2022 2	Olimpija Ljubljana (Slovenia)	0–1	(Slovakia) Slovan Bratislava	Ljubljana, Slovenia
18:45 CEST (UTC+02:00)		Report (UEFA); Report (Slovan)	Weiss Jr. (penalty missed) 28'; Čavrić 55' (pen.)	Stadium: Stožice Stadium; Attendance: 5,064; Referee: Anastasios Sidiropoulos (Greece)

Thursday, 26 October 2023 3	Lille (France)	2–1	(Slovakia) Slovan Bratislava	Lille, France
18:45 CEST (UTC+02:00)	Yazıcı 68'; Cabella 82'	Report (UEFA); Report (Slovan)	Čavrić 23'; Lovat (red card) 84'	Stadium: Stade Pierre-Mauroy; Attendance: 19,610; Referee: Luca Pairetto (Italy)

Thursday, 9 November 2023 4	Slovan Bratislava (Slovakia)	1–1	(France) Lille	Bratislava, Slovakia
21:00 CET (UTC+01:00)	Čavrić 81'	Report (UEFA); Report (Slovan)	Gomes 53'	Stadium: Tehelné pole Attendance: 21,544; Referee: Gergő Bogár (Hungary)

Thursday, 30 November 2023 5	KÍ (Faroe Islands)	1–2	(Slovakia) Slovan Bratislava	Tórshavn, Faroe Islands
18:45 CET (UTC+01:00)	Mikkelsen 17'	Report (UEFA); Report (Slovan)	Kucka 24', 62'	Stadium: Tórsvøllur; Attendance: 1,249; Referee: Kristo Tohver (Estonia)

Thursday, 14 December 2023 6	Slovan Bratislava (Slovakia)	1–2	(Slovenia) Olimpija Ljubljana	Bratislava, Slovakia
21:00 CET (UTC+01:00)	Blackman 27'; Borjan (red card) 54'	Report (UEFA); Report (Slovan)	Pedro Lucas 17', 58'	Stadium: Tehelné pole Attendance: 14,387; Referee: Arda Kardeşler (Turkey)

=== Knockout phase ===
==== Knockout round play-offs ====
The draw for the knockout round play-offs was held on 18 December 2023.

Thursday, 15 February 2024 First leg	Sturm Graz (Austria)	4–1	(Slovakia) Slovan Bratislava	Graz, Austria
18:45 CET (UTC+01:00)	Biereth 4'; Stanković 27'; Kiteishvili 64' (pen.); Camara 90+1'	Report (UEFA)	Rodrigues 8'; Weiss ml. (red card) 78'	Stadium: Liebenauer Stadium; Attendance: 12,817; Referee: Mohammed Al-Hakim (Sweden)

Thursday, 22 February 2024 Second leg	Slovan Bratislava (Slovakia)	0–1 (1–5 agg.)	(Austria) Sturm Graz	Bratislava, Slovakia
21:00 CET (UTC+01:00)	Blackman (red card) 90+2'	Report (UEFA)	Biereth 52'	Stadium: Tehelné pole Attendance: 19,870; Referee: Orel Grinfeld (Israel)

== Statistics ==
=== Goalscorers ===
As of match played 17 December 2023

No.	Pos.	Nat.	Name	Niké liga	Slovak Cup	Champions League	Europa League	Europa Conference League	Total
4	DF	(Georgia (country))	Guram Kashia	1					1
5	DF	(Slovakia)	Richard Križan		3				3
7	MF	(Slovakia)	Vladimír Weiss Jr.			3		1	4
8	MF	(Czech Republic)	Jaromír Zmrhal	1	1				2
11	MF	(Armenia)	Tigran Barseghyan	7			1		8
13	FW	(Slovakia)	David Strelec	8	1		2		11
15	FW	(Ghana)	Abubakari Malik	1	3				4
17	FW	(Slovakia)	Rudolf Božík		1				1
18	MF	(Slovakia)	Nino Marcelli	5					5
20	MF	(Georgia (country))	Jaba Kankava		1				1
23	FW	(Ghana)	Sharani Zuberu		1	2			3
24	MF	(Croatia)	Marko Tolić	6	2	1	1		10
25	DF	(Slovakia)	Lukáš Pauschek	1					1
28	DF	(Panama)	César Blackman	1				1	2
33	MF	(Slovakia)	Juraj Kucka	2				2	4
36	DF	(Brazil)	Lucas Lovat	1					1
77	FW	(Serbia)	Aleksandar Čavrić	9		1		4	14
Own goals				2		1			3
Total				45	13	8	4	8	78

=== Clean sheets ===
As of match played 17 December 2023

No.	Nat.	Name	Niké liga	Slovak Cup	Champions League	Europa League	Europa Conference League	Total
31	(Slovakia)	Martin Trnovský	2	2				4
82	(Canada)	Milan Borjan	6		2		1	9
Total			8	2	2		1	13

=== Attendances ===
	Matches	Attendances	Average	High	Low
Niké liga	16	92,530	5,783	11,130	2,329
Slovak Cup	2	3,893	1,947	2,273	1,620
Champions League	3	56,343	18,781	21,375	14,470
Europa League	1	17,564	17,564	17,564	17,564
Europa Conference League	4	68,255	17,064	21,544	12,454
Total	26	238,585	9,176	21,544	1,620

== Awards ==
=== Niké liga Goal of the Month ===
Month	Player	Ref
September	(Armenia) Tigran Barseghyan	
October	(Brazil) Lucas Lovat	
