= 2022–23 ŠK Slovan Bratislava season =

Slovan Bratislava
2022–23 season
- Chairman: Ivan Kmotrík
- Head coach: Vladimír Weiss
- Stadium: Tehelné pole
- Slovak 1st League: 1st
- Slovak Cup: Runners-up
- UEFA Champions League: Second qualifying round
- UEFA Europa League: Third qualifying round
- UEFA Europa Conference League: Round of 16
- Top goalscorer: League: Aleksandar Čavrić (15); All: Aleksandar Čavrić (24)
- Highest home attendance: 21,675 v Basel; 16 March 2023 (UEFA Europa Conference League)
- Lowest home attendance: 2,157 v Skalica; 12 April 2023 (Slovak Cup)
- Biggest win: 7–0 v Družstevník Malá Mača; 28 September 2022 (Slovak Cup)
- Biggest defeat: 0–4 v Trenčín; 9 October 2022 (Fortuna liga)
Home colours	Away colours	Third colours

The 2022–23 season was ŠK Slovan Bratislava's 17th consecutive in the top flight of Slovak football.

Slovan successfully defended their league title, winning it for a record-extending fifth consecutive time.

In addition to the domestic league, Slovan also competed in the Slovak Cup. However, for the second consecutive year, they lost in a final.

As the league champions from the previous season, Slovan qualified for the UEFA Champions League. However, they were eliminated in the second qualifying round. Subsequently, Slovan participated in this season's edition of the UEFA Europa League but were eliminated in the third qualifying round. Slovan automatically advanced to the UEFA Conference League, where they topped their group, ensuring their participation in the Round of 16. This was also the first time since the famous year of 1969 when Slovan played in a European competition during the spring part of the season.

The season covers the period from 1 June 2022 to 31 May 2023.

== Players ==
As of 20 May 2023

Squad No.	Name	Nationality	Position(s)	Date of birth (age)	Signed from / Previous club	Since
Goalkeepers
1	Adrián Chovan	(Slovakia)	GK	8 October 1995 (age 31)	(Slovakia) Zlaté Moravce	2021
30	Michal Šulla	(Slovakia)	GK	15 July 1991 (age 35)	(Slovakia) Senica	2018
31	Martin Trnovský	(Slovakia)	GK	7 June 2000 (age 26)	Youth system	2019
35	Adam Hrdina	(Slovakia)	GK	12 February 2004 (age 22)	Youth system	2022
Defenders
2	Siemen Voet	(Belgium)	CB	3 February 2000 (age 26)	(Netherlands) PEC Zwolle	2022
4	Guram Kashia	(Georgia (country))	CB	4 July 1987 (age 39)	(Georgia (country)) Locomotive Tbilisi	2021
5	Richard Križan	(Slovakia)	CB	23 September 1997 (age 29)	(Slovakia) Trenčín	2021
6	Maudo Jarjué	(The Gambia) (Guinea-Bissau)	CB	30 September 1997 (age 29)	(Sweden) IF Elfsborg (loan)	2023
17	Jurij Medveděv	(Czech Republic) (Kazakhstan)	RB	18 June 1996 (age 30)	(Slovakia) Senica	2018
25	Lukáš Pauschek	(Slovakia)	RB / LB	9 December 1992 (age 33)	(Czech Republic) Mladá Boleslav	2019
36	Lucas Lovat	(Brazil)	LB	15 January 1997 (age 29)	(Slovakia) Spartak Trnava	2020
81	Vernon De Marco	(Slovakia) (Argentina)	LB / CB	18 November 1992 (age 33)	(Slovakia) Zemplín Michalovce	2017
—	Kenan Bajrić (out on loan at (Cyprus) Pafos)	(Slovenia)	CB / DM	20 December 1994 (age 31)	(Slovenia) Olimpija Ljubljana	2018
—	David Hrnčár (out on loan at (Belgium) Beveren)	(Slovakia)	RB / RW	10 December 1997 (age 28)	Youth system	2021
—	Matúš Vojtko (out on loan at (Croatia) Gorica)	(Slovakia)	LB	5 October 2000 (age 26)	(Slovakia) Zemplín Michalovce	2021
Midfielders
3	Uche Agbo	(Nigeria)	DM / CM / CB	4 December 1995 (age 30)	(Spain) Deportivo La Coruña	2021
7	Vladimír Weiss Jr. (captain)	(Slovakia)	CAM / LW / RW	30 November 1989 (age 36)	(Qatar) Al-Gharafa	2020
8	Dávid Holman	(Hungary)	CAM / CM	17 March 1993 (age 33)	(Hungary) Debrecen	2017
10	Giorgi Chakvetadze	(Georgia (country))	CAM / LW	29 August 1999 (age 27)	(Belgium) Gent (loan)	2022
11	Tigran Barseghyan	(Armenia)	RW / LW	22 September 1993 (age 33)	(Kazakhstan) Astana	2022
19	Andre Green	(England)	LW / RW / ST	26 July 1998 (age 28)	(England) Sheffield Wednesday	2021
20	Jaba Kankava	(Georgia (country))	DM / CM	18 March 1986 (age 40)	(France) Valenciennes	2021
21	Jaromír Zmrhal	(Czech Republic)	LW / RW / LB	2 August 1993 (age 33)	(Italy) Brescia	2021
26	Filip Lichý	(Slovakia)	CM / CAM / DM	25 January 2001 (age 25)	Youth system	2020
33	Juraj Kucka	(Slovakia)	DM / CM	26 February 1987 (age 39)	(Italy) Parma	2022
Forwards
15	Abubakari Malik	(Ghana)	ST	10 May 2000 (age 26)	(Sweden) Malmö FF (loan)	2023
23	Sharani Zuberu	(Ghana)	ST / RW / LW	7 January 2000 (age 26)	(Ghana) Dreams (loan)	2023
28	Adler Da Silva	(Switzerland) (Brazil)	ST / CAM	28 December 1998 (age 27)	(Slovakia) Pohronie	2022
77	Aleksandar Čavrić	(Serbia)	ST / RW	18 May 1994 (age 32)	(Belgium) Genk	2016
—	Ezekiel Henty (out on loan at (Cyprus) Apollon Limassol)	(Nigeria)	ST	13 May 1993 (age 33)	(Hungary) Puskás Akadémia	2020
—	Žan Medved (out on loan at (Slovakia) Skalica)	(Slovenia)	ST	14 June 1999 (age 27)	(Slovenia) Olimpija Ljubljana	2020
—	Ivan Šaponjić (out on loan at (Turkey) Bandırmaspor)	(Serbia)	ST	2 August 1997 (age 29)	(Spain) Atlético Madrid	2022

== Transfers and loans ==
=== Transfers in ===
Date	Position	Nationality	Name	From / Previous club	Fee	Ref.
30 June 2022	DF	(Slovenia)	Kenan Bajrić	(Cyprus) Pafos	Loan return	
30 June 2022	MF	(Czech Republic)	Erik Daniel	(Poland) Zagłębie Lubin	Loan return	
30 June 2022	MF	(Netherlands)	Joeri de Kamps	(Netherlands) Sparta Rotterdam	Loan return	
30 June 2022	MF	(Serbia)	Dejan Dražić	(Hungary) Honvéd	Loan return	
30 June 2022	FW	(Nigeria)	Ezekiel Henty	(Saudi Arabia) Al-Hazem	Loan return	
30 June 2022	MF	(Slovakia)	Marián Chobot	(Slovakia) Zlaté Moravce	Loan return	
30 June 2022	MF	(Slovakia)	Filip Lichý	(Slovakia) Ružomberok	Loan return	
30 June 2022	FW	(Slovenia)	Žan Medved	(Slovenia) Celje	Loan return	
30 June 2022	FW	(Slovenia)	Alen Ožbolt	(Israel) Hapoel Haifa	Loan return	
1 July 2022	FW	(Switzerland)	Adler Da Silva	(Slovakia) Pohronie	€250,000 (Note: Unofficial fee.)	
1 July 2022	MF	(Slovakia)	Juraj Kucka	(Italy) Parma	Free transfer	
1 July 2022	DF	(Belgium)	Siemen Voet	(Netherlands) PEC Zwolle	€150,000 (Note: Unofficial fee.)	
31 December 2022	MF	(Slovakia)	Filip Lichý	(Slovakia) Ružomberok	Loan return	
31 December 2022	FW	(Switzerland)	Adler Da Silva	(Slovakia) Zemplín Michalovce	Loan return	

=== Loans in ===
Start date	Position	Nationality	Name	From	End date	Ref.
1 July 2022	FW	(Venezuela)	Eric Ramírez	(Ukraine) Dynamo Kyiv	30 June 2023	
4 July 2022	MF	(Georgia (country))	Giorgi Chakvetadze	(Belgium) Gent	30 June 2023	
1 February 2023	FW	(Ghana)	Abubakari Malik	(Sweden) Malmö FF	31 December 2023	
1 February 2023	DF	(The Gambia)	Maudo Jarjué	(Sweden) IF Elfsborg	30 June 2023	
1 February 2023	FW	(Ghana)	Sharani Zuberu	(Ghana) Dreams	31 December 2023	

=== Transfers out ===
Date	Position	Nationality	Name	To / Next club	Fee	Ref.
30 June 2022	FW	(Slovakia)	Samuel Mráz	(Italy) Spezia	End of loan	
1 July 2022	DF	(Bulgaria)	Vasil Bozhikov		End of contract	
17 July 2022	FW	(Slovenia)	Alen Ožbolt	(Israel) Hapoel Tel Aviv	€220,000 (Note: Unofficial fee.)	
20 July 2022	MF	(Czech Republic)	Erik Daniel	(Slovakia) Spartak Trnava	Undisclosed	
27 July 2022	FW	(Slovakia)	Roman Čerepkai	(Czech Republic) Teplice	Undisclosed	
29 July 2022	MF	(Serbia)	Dejan Dražić	(Turkey) Bodrumspor	Undisclosed	
30 August 2022	MF	(Netherlands)	Joeri de Kamps	(Poland) Lechia Gdańsk	Undisclosed	
19 January 2023	DF	(Suriname)	Myenty Abena	(Hungary) Ferencváros	€400,000 (Note: Unofficial fee.)	
19 January 2023	MF	(Nigeria)	Ibrahim Rabiu		End of contract	
27 January 2023	MF	(Bosnia and Herzegovina)	Alen Mustafić	(Denmark) OB	Undisclosed	

=== Loans out ===
Start date	Position	Nationality	Name	To	End date	Ref.
1 July 2022	FW	(Switzerland)	Adler Da Silva	(Slovakia) Zemplín Michalovce	31 December 2022	
2 July 2022	DF	(Slovenia)	Kenan Bajrić	(Cyprus) Pafos	30 June 2023	
5 July 2022	MF	(Slovakia)	Filip Lichý	(Slovakia) Ružomberok	31 December 2022	
11 July 2022	DF	(Slovakia)	Matúš Vojtko	(Croatia) Gorica	30 June 2023	
11 August 2022	FW	(Nigeria)	Ezekiel Henty	(Cyprus) Apollon Limassol	30 June 2023	
5 January 2023	FW	(Slovenia)	Žan Medved	(Slovakia) Skalica	30 June 2023	
19 January 2023	DF	(Slovakia)	David Hrnčár	(Belgium) Beveren	30 June 2023	
2 February 2023	FW	(Serbia)	Ivan Šaponjić	(Turkey) Bandırmaspor	30 June 2023	

== Friendlies ==
Win Draw Loss

=== Pre-season ===
Slovan announced their pre-season program on 3 June 2022. The match against Zbrojovka Brno was confirmed at a later date.

Saturday, 18 June 2022	Ried (Austria)	0–3	(Slovakia) Slovan Bratislava	Grieskirchen, Austria
17:30 CEST (UTC+02:00)		Report	Zmrhal 55'; Križan 65'; Dražić 82'

Wednesday, 22 June 2022	DAC Dunajská Streda (Slovakia)	0–0	(Slovakia) Slovan Bratislava	Dunajská Streda, Slovakia
17:30 CEST (UTC+02:00)		Report		Stadium: MOL Football Academy

Tuesday, 28 June 2022	Viktoria Plzeň (Czech Republic)	3–1	(Slovakia) Slovan Bratislava	Dobřany, Czechia
16:30 CEST (UTC+02:00)	Mihálik 36'; Chorý 61', 62'; Kliment (red card) 75' (substitution was enabled)	Report	Weiss Jr. 70' (pen.), (red card) 75' (substitution was enabled)	Attendance: 2,900

Saturday, 2 July 2022	Zbrojovka Brno (Czech Republic)	2–2	(Slovakia) Slovan Bratislava	Brno, Czechia
17:00 CEST (UTC+02:00)	Hladík 37' (pen.); Alli 57'	Report	Ramírez 34'; Zmrhal 82'	Stadium: Městský fotbalový stadion Srbská; Attendance: 1,200

=== On-season ===
Wednesday, 30 November 2022	DAC Dunajská Streda (Slovakia)	2–4	(Slovakia) Slovan Bratislava	Dunajská Streda, Slovakia
13:00 CET (UTC+01:00)	Davis (penalty missed) 20'; Ramadan 47'; Nebyla 76'	Report	Čavrić 7', 34'; Zmrhal 23'; Zuberu 38'	Stadium: MOL Football Academy; Attendance: 120

=== Mid-season ===
Slovan announced their winter break schedule on 7 December 2022.

Friday, 20 January 2023	Slovan Bratislava (Slovakia)	2–1	(Czech Republic) Zbrojovka Brno	Senica, Slovakia
14:00 CET (UTC+01:00)	Čavrić 26'; Kucka 82'	Report	Ševčík 19'	Stadium: Štadión FK Senica

Wednesday, 25 January 2023	St. Pölten (Austria)	2–2	(Slovakia) Slovan Bratislava	Sankt Pölten, Austria
14:00 CET (UTC+01:00)	Salamon 59'; Hartwig 74'	Report	Zmrhal 12'; Weiss Jr. 69'	Stadium: NV Arena

Saturday, 28 January 2023	Red Bull Salzburg (Austria)	1–0	(Slovakia) Slovan Bratislava	Salzburg, Austria
15:00 CET (UTC+01:00)	Okafor 54'; Koïta (penalty missed) 65'	Report	Weiss Jr. (red card) 95'
Note: The match lasted 120 minutes. After the regular 90 minutes, a 30-minute extra time was played.

== Competition overview ==
Competition	First match	Last match	Starting round	Final position	Record							
Competition	First match	Last match	Starting round	Final position	Pld	W	D	L	GF	GA	GD	Win %
Fortuna liga	16 July 2022	20 May 2023	Matchday 1	1st	32	21	6	5	65	32	+33	65.63
Slovak Cup	24 September 2022	1 May 2023	Second round	Runners-up	8	5	2	1	21	11	+10	62.50
Champions League	6 July 2022	27 July 2022	First qualifying round	Second qualifying round	4	2	1	1	5	6	−1	50.00
Europa League	4 August 2022	11 August 2022	Third qualifying round	Third qualifying round	2	0	2	0	3	3	+0	0.00
Europa Conference League	18 August 2022	16 March 2023	Play-off round	Round of 16	10	4	4	2	15	13	+2	40.00
Total					56	32	15	9	109	65	+44	57.14

Source: Competitions

== Fortuna liga ==
=== League table ===
==== Regular stage ====
Pos	Team	Pld	W	D	L	GF	GA	GD	Pts	Qualification
1	DAC Dunajská Streda	22	14	6	2	39	17	+22	48	Qualification for the championship group
2	Slovan Bratislava	22	14	5	3	47	23	+24	47	Qualification for the championship group
3	Spartak Trnava	22	12	4	6	39	26	+13	40	Qualification for the championship group
4	Podbrezová	22	9	8	5	32	24	+8	35	Qualification for the championship group
5	Žilina	22	9	4	9	34	33	+1	31	Qualification for the championship group
6	Dukla Banská Bystrica	22	9	4	9	34	37	−3	31	Qualification for the championship group

Source: Niké liga (in Slovak)
Rules for classification: 1) Points; 2) Head-to-head points; 3) Head-to-head goal difference; 4) Head-to-head away goals scored; 5) Play-off.

==== Championship group ====
Pos	Team	Pld	W	D	L	GF	GA	GD	Pts	Qualification	SLO	DAC	TRN	POD	DUK	ŽIL
1	Slovan Bratislava (C)	32	21	6	5	65	32	+33	69	Qualification for the Champions League first qualifying round	—	2–1	1–0	0–1	4–0	0–1
2	DAC Dunajská Streda	32	20	7	5	54	29	+25	67	Qualification for the Europa Conference League first qualifying round	2–3	—	3–1	2–1	1–0	1–0
3	Spartak Trnava	32	15	7	10	55	38	+17	52	Qualification for the Europa Conference League second qualifying round (Note: Spartak Trnava qualified for the Europa Conference League second qualifying round by winning the 2022–23 Slovak Cup.)	0–0	1–1	—	6–1	0–1	4–2
4	Podbrezová	32	13	8	11	44	44	0	47	Qualification for the Europa Conference League play-offs	1–2	2–0	0–3	—	1–2	3–2
5	Dukla Banská Bystrica	32	13	5	14	50	56	−6	44	Qualification for the Europa Conference League play-offs	1–2	2–3	2–0	3–1	—	1–1
6	Žilina (O)	32	11	6	15	49	53	−4	39	Qualification for the Europa Conference League play-offs	2–4	0–1	1–1	0–1	6–4	—

Source: Niké liga (in Slovak)
Legend: Blue = home team win; Yellow = draw; Red = away team win.
Rules for classification: 1) Points; 2) Head-to-head points; 3) Head-to-head goal difference; 4) Head-to-head away goals scored; 5) Play-off.
(C) Champions; (O) Play-off winners

=== Results summary ===
Overall								Home						Away					
Pld	W	D	L	GF	GA	GD	Pts	W	D	L	GF	GA	GD	W	D	L	GF	GA	GD
32	21	6	5	65	32	+33	69	12	2	2	38	12	+26	9	4	3	27	20	+7

=== Results by matchday ===
Round	1	2	3	4	5	6	7	8	9	11	12	13	14	15	16	17	18	19	10	20	21	22	23	24	25	26	27	28	29	30	31	32
Ground	A	H	H	H	A	H	A	H	A	A	H	A	A	A	H	A	H	H	A	H	A	H	H	A	A	H	H	A	H	A	A	H
Result	L	W	W	W	W	W	W	D	W	D	W	L	W	W	W	L	W	W	D	D	D	W	L	W	D	W	W	W	W	W	W	L
Position	8	5	2	1	1	1	1	1	1	1	1	1	1	1	1	1	1	1	1	1	2	2	2	2	2	2	2	2	1	1	1	1
Points	0	3	6	9	12	15	18	19	22	23	26	26	29	32	35	35	38	41	42	43	44	47	47	50	51	54	57	60	63	66	69	69

A = Away; H = Home; W = Win; D = Draw; L = Loss

=== Matches ===
The league fixtures were announced on 16 June 2022.

Regular stage

Saturday, 16 July 2022 1	Podbrezová	2–1	Slovan Bratislava	Podbrezová
20:30 CEST (UTC+02:00)	Ďatko 16'; Godál 48'	Report	Holman 84' (pen.)	Stadium: ZELPO Aréna; Attendance: 3,157

Saturday, 23 July 2022 2	Slovan Bratislava	4–0	Trenčín	Bratislava
18:00 CEST (UTC+02:00)	Hrnčár 36', 90'; Green 69'; Kucka 82'	Report		Stadium: Tehelné pole Attendance: 5,338

Saturday, 30 July 2022 3	Slovan Bratislava	4–2	Zemplín Michalovce	Bratislava
18:00 CEST (UTC+02:00)	Barseghyan 60'; Green 72'; Agbo 84'; Jeřábek 90+1' (o.g.)	Report	Kanu 9'; Peña 45'	Stadium: Tehelné pole Attendance: 3,264
Note: The order of matches between Slovan Bratislava and Zemplín Michalovce was reversed. Originally, the first match in July was supposed to take place in Michalovce, but the Presidium of the Union of League Clubs, which is the governing organization for the Slovak top level football competition, approved the agreement between the two clubs to change the order of their matches. The reason was that Slovan did not have to travel to Michalovce due to their schedule in the UEFA competitions preliminary rounds.

Sunday, 7 August 2022 4	Slovan Bratislava	3–0	Skalica	Bratislava
18:00 CEST (UTC+02:00)	Zmrhal 45+2'; Šaponjić 52' (pen.); Hrnčár 66'	Report		Stadium: Tehelné pole Attendance: 3,308

Sunday, 14 August 2022 5	Tatran Liptovský Mikuláš	1–5	Slovan Bratislava	Poprad
18:00 CEST (UTC+02:00)	Popović 28'	Report	Čavrić 13'; Šaponjić 53'; Hrnčár 56', 71'; Kucka 83'	Stadium: NTC Poprad; Attendance: 1,956

Sunday, 21 August 2022 6	Slovan Bratislava	3–1	Žilina	Bratislava
20:30 CEST (UTC+02:00)	Čavrić 2', 4'; Zmrhal 72'	Report	Ďuriš 48'	Stadium: Tehelné pole Attendance: 3,548

Sunday, 28 August 2022 7	Ružomberok	0–1	Slovan Bratislava	Ružomberok
20:30 CEST (UTC+02:00)		Report	Barseghyan 90+1'	Stadium: Štadión pod Čebraťom; Attendance: 2,574

Wednesday, 31 August 2022 8	Slovan Bratislava	1–1	DAC Dunajská Streda	Bratislava
20:30 CEST (UTC+02:00)	Ramírez 72' (pen.)	Report	Krstović 3'	Stadium: Tehelné pole Attendance: 5,201

Saturday, 3 September 2022 9	Dukla Banská Bystrica	0–1	Slovan Bratislava	Banská Bystrica
18:00 CEST (UTC+02:00)		Report	Barseghyan 65'	Stadium: Štadión SNP; Attendance: 5,350

Sunday, 18 September 2022 11	Spartak Trnava	0–0	Slovan Bratislava	Trnava
17:30 CEST (UTC+02:00)		Report		Stadium: Štadión Antona Malatinského; Attendance: 9,047

Sunday, 2 October 2022 12	Slovan Bratislava	3–1	Podbrezová	Bratislava
17:30 CEST (UTC+02:00)	Weiss Jr. 58'; Kashia 88'; De Marco 90+3'	Report	Godál 66'	Stadium: Tehelné pole Attendance: 3,715

Sunday, 9 October 2022 13	Trenčín	4–0	Slovan Bratislava	Trenčín
18:00 CEST (UTC+02:00)	Pires 20', 58'; Soares 31'; Ibrahim 86'	Report		Stadium: Štadión Sihoť; Attendance: 1,703

Sunday, 16 October 2022 14	Zemplín Michalovce	0–1	Slovan Bratislava	Michalovce
19:00 CEST (UTC+02:00)		Report	Kucka 66'	Stadium: Mestský futbalový štadión Attendance: 1,528
Note: The order of matches between Slovan Bratislava and Zemplín Michalovce was reversed. Originally, the first match in July was supposed to take place in Michalovce, but the Presidium of the Union of League Clubs, which is the governing organization for the Slovak top level football competition, approved the agreement between the two clubs to change the order of their matches. The reason was that Slovan did not have to travel to Michalovce due to their schedule in the UEFA competitions preliminary rounds.

Friday, 21 October 2022 15	Skalica	1–4	Slovan Bratislava	Skalica
17:30 CEST (UTC+02:00)	Fábry 87'	Report	Weiss Jr. 11' (pen.); Kucka 44'; Čavrić 45'; Barseghyan 58'	Stadium: Štadión MFK Skalica; Attendance: 3,000

Sunday, 30 October 2022 16	Slovan Bratislava	1–0	Tatran Liptovský Mikuláš	Bratislava
15:00 CET (UTC+01:00)	Ramírez 48'	Report		Stadium: Tehelné pole Attendance: 2,689

Sunday, 6 November 2022 17	Žilina	4–1	Slovan Bratislava	Žilina
17:30 CET (UTC+01:00)	Kaprálik 6', 21', 35', 81'	Report	Čavrić 88'	Stadium: Štadión pod Dubňom; Attendance: 3,116

Sunday, 13 November 2022 18	Slovan Bratislava	2–0	Ružomberok	Bratislava
17:30 CET (UTC+01:00)	Ramírez 48'; Weiss Jr. (penalty missed) 56', 56'	Report		Stadium: Tehelné pole Attendance: 3,570

Thursday, 24 November 2022 10	Slovan Bratislava	4–1	Zlaté Moravce	Bratislava
18:30 CET (UTC+01:00)	Weiss Jr. 24'; Čavrić 43', 86'; Kashia 62'	Report	Mondek 37'	Stadium: Tehelné pole Attendance: 2,836
Note: Originally scheduled for Sunday, 11 September 2022, this match was postponed based on the agreement of the clubs due to the schedule of Slovan Bratislava in the UEFA Europa Conference League.

Sunday, 12 February 2023 19	DAC Dunajská Streda	1–1	Slovan Bratislava	Dunajská Streda
17:30 CET (UTC+01:00)	Blackman 7'; Risvanis (red card) 40'	Report	Kucka 68'	Stadium: MOL Aréna; Attendance: 9,161

Saturday, 18 February 2023 20	Slovan Bratislava	2–2	Dukla Banská Bystrica	Bratislava
15:00 CET (UTC+01:00)	Weiss Jr. 76' (pen.); Green 90'	Report	Polievka 22', 38'	Stadium: Tehelné pole Attendance: 4,055

Saturday, 25 February 2023 21	Zlaté Moravce	1–1	Slovan Bratislava	Zlaté Moravce
15:00 CET (UTC+01:00)	Križan 54' (o.g.)	Report	Weiss Jr. 25'	Stadium: ViOn Aréna; Attendance: 3,013

Saturday, 4 March 2023 22	Slovan Bratislava	4–1	Spartak Trnava	Bratislava
16:30 CET (UTC+01:00)	Kucka 17'; Čavrić 37'; Malik 39'; Barseghyan 81' (pen.)	Report	Kóša 58'; Koštrna (yellow card) 45+2' (yellow-red card) 77'	Stadium: Tehelné pole Attendance: 11,480

Championship group

Sunday, 12 March 2023 23 / Championship group round 1	Slovan Bratislava	0–1	Žilina	Bratislava
15:00 CET (UTC+01:00)		Report	Javorček 36'	Stadium: Tehelné pole Attendance: 4,834

Sunday, 19 March 2023 24 / 2	Podbrezová	1–2	Slovan Bratislava	Podbrezová
15:00 CET (UTC+01:00)	Kabongo 45'	Report	De Marco 40'; Green 52'	Stadium: ZELPO Aréna; Attendance: 3,175

Sunday, 2 April 2023 25 / 3	Spartak Trnava	0–0	Slovan Bratislava	Trnava
17:34 CEST (UTC+02:00)		Report		Stadium: Štadión Antona Malatinského; Attendance: 9,677
Note: The kick-off of the match was postponed by 4 minutes due to smoke from pyrotechnics, which caused a temporary reduced visibility.

Sunday, 9 April 2023 26 / 4	Slovan Bratislava	2–1	DAC Dunajská Streda	Bratislava
17:30 CEST (UTC+02:00)	Čavrić 65'; Malik 69'	Report	Kalmár 64'	Stadium: Tehelné pole Attendance: 10,590

Sunday, 16 April 2023 27 / 5	Slovan Bratislava	4–0	Dukla Banská Bystrica	Bratislava
17:30 CEST (UTC+02:00)	Kankava 35'; Čavrić 56'; Weiss Jr. 59'; Chakvetadze 73'	Report	Faško (penalty missed) 20'	Stadium: Tehelné pole Attendance: 5,044

Sunday, 23 April 2023 28 / 6	Žilina	2–4	Slovan Bratislava	Žilina
15:30 CEST (UTC+02:00)	Jambor 35', 51'	Report	Green 5'; Čavrić 21', 58'; Weiss Jr. 70'	Stadium: Štadión pod Dubňom; Attendance: 4,018

Friday, 28 April 2023 29 / 7	Slovan Bratislava	1–0	Spartak Trnava	Bratislava
20:30 CEST (UTC+02:00)	Čavrić 13' (pen.)	Report		Stadium: Tehelné pole Attendance: 10,540

Sunday, 7 May 2023 30 / 8	DAC Dunajská Streda	2–3	Slovan Bratislava	Dunajská Streda
17:30 CEST (UTC+02:00)	Krstović 5'; Ramadan 80'	Report	Lovat 42'; Green 74'; Weiss Jr. 90+5' (pen.), (yellow card) 75' (yellow-red card) 90+5' (first (yellow card) off the pitch)	Stadium: MOL Aréna; Attendance: 12,211

Saturday, 13 May 2023 31 / 9	Dukla Banská Bystrica	1–2	Slovan Bratislava	Banská Bystrica
16:30 CEST (UTC+02:00)	Depetris 89'	Report	Čavrić 12', 61' (pen.)	Stadium: Štadión SNP; Attendance: 6,018

Saturday, 20 May 2023 32 / 10	Slovan Bratislava	0–1	Podbrezová	Bratislava
18:00 CEST (UTC+02:00)		Report	Ďatko 46'	Stadium: Tehelné pole Attendance: 15,606

== Slovak Cup ==
Saturday, 24 September 2022 Second round	Branč (5)	0–2	Slovan Bratislava (1)	Branč
15:00 CEST (UTC+02:00)		Report	Mustafić 45'; Šaponjić 52'	Attendance: 1,712

Wednesday, 28 September 2022 Third round	Družstevník Malá Mača (6)	0–7	Slovan Bratislava (1)	Malá Mača
15:30 CEST (UTC+02:00)		Report	Ramírez 22'; Hrnčár 29', 65'; Čavrić 38', 43'; Zmrhal 60'; Kankava 61'	Attendance: 650

Wednesday, 9 November 2022 Fourth round	Stropkov (3)	2–3	Slovan Bratislava (1)	Stropkov
13:00 CET (UTC+01:00)	Varga 79'; Polaščík 88'	Report	Čavrić 2', 14'; Voet 45'	Stadium: Štadión MŠK Tesla Stropkov; Attendance: 2,954

Tuesday, 7 February 2023 Round of 16	Dukla Banská Bystrica (1)	1–2	Slovan Bratislava (1)	Banská Bystrica
16:00 CET (UTC+01:00)	Hanes 43'	Report	Malik 21'; Čavrić 62'	Stadium: Štadión SNP; Attendance: 781
Note: Originally scheduled for Saturday, 4 February 2023, this match was postponed due to bad weather conditions (heavy snow).

Wednesday, 1 March 2023 Quarter-finals	ŠTK Šamorín (2)	1–1 (3–4 p)	Slovan Bratislava (1)	Dunajská Streda
16:30 CET (UTC+01:00)	Szabó 6'	Report	Barseghyan 41'	Stadium: MOL Aréna; Attendance: 1,484
	Penalties
	Nagy (penalty scored); Bahi (penalty missed); Csóka (penalty scored); Szabó (penalty missed); Szolgai (penalty scored)		(penalty missed) Čavrić; (penalty scored) Lichý; (penalty scored) Kucka; (penalty scored) De Marco; (penalty scored) Weiss Jr.
Note: For security reasons, the match was not played at Šamorín's home stadium, Pomlé Stadium.

Wednesday, 12 April 2023 Semi-finals First leg	Slovan Bratislava (1)	2–1	Skalica (1)	Bratislava
18:00 CEST (UTC+2)	Malik 19'; Weiss Jr. 88' (pen.)	Report	Morong 39'	Stadium: Tehelné pole Attendance: 2,157

Wednesday, 19 April 2023 Semi-finals Second leg	Skalica (1)	3–3 (a.e.t.) (4–5 agg.)	Slovan Bratislava (1)	Skalica
17:00 CEST (UTC+2)	Vlasko 33'; Haša 79', 90+2'	Report	Green 58', 75'; Kankava 93'	Stadium: Štadión MFK Skalica; Attendance: 2,717

Monday, 1 May 2023 Final	Spartak Trnava (1)	3–1 (a.e.t.)	Slovan Bratislava (1)	Trnava
15:00 CEST (UTC+02:00)	Taiwo 85'; Paur 110'; Twardzik 120+5' (pen.)	Report	Green 57'	Stadium: Štadión Antona Malatinského; Attendance: 15,427

== UEFA Champions League ==
=== First qualifying round ===
The draw for the first qualifying round was held on 14 June 2022.

Wednesday, 6 July 2022 First leg	Slovan Bratislava (Slovakia)	0–0	(Georgia (country)) Dinamo Batumi	Bratislava, Slovakia
20:30 CEST (UTC+02:00)		Report (UEFA); Report (Slovan)	Kobakhidze (yellow card) 26' (yellow-red card) 42'	Stadium: Tehelné pole Attendance: 10,589; Referee: David Coote (England)

Wednesday, 13 July 2022 Second leg	Dinamo Batumi (Georgia (country))	1–2 (a.e.t.) (1–2 agg.)	(Slovakia) Slovan Bratislava	Batumi, Georgia
19:00 CEST (UTC+02:00)	Davitashvili 104'	Report (UEFA); Report (Slovan)	Barseghyan 115'; Weiss Jr. 120+3'	Stadium: Batumi Stadium; Attendance: 20,022; Referee: António Nobre (Portugal)

=== Second qualifying round ===
The draw for the second qualifying round was held on 15 June 2022.

Wednesday, 20 July 2022 First leg	Ferencváros (Hungary)	1–2	(Slovakia) Slovan Bratislava	Budapest, Hungary
20:00 CEST (UTC+02:00)	Zachariassen 70'	Report (UEFA); Report (Slovan)	Kashia 81'; Barseghyan 86'	Stadium: Ferencváros Stadion; Attendance: 20,459; Referee: Ricardo de Burgos (Spain)

Wednesday, 27 July 2022 Second leg	Slovan Bratislava (Slovakia)	1–4 (3–5 agg.)	(Hungary) Ferencváros	Bratislava, Slovakia
20:30 CEST (UTC+02:00)	De Marco 70'	Report (UEFA); Report (Slovan)	Boli 20'; Zachariassen 31'; Traoré 89'; Laïdouni 90+5'	Stadium: Tehelné pole Attendance: 21,500; Referee: Marco Di Bello (Italy)

== UEFA Europa League ==
=== Third qualifying round ===
The draw for the third qualifying round was held on 18 July 2022.

Thursday, 4 August 2022 First leg	Olympiacos (Greece)	1–1	(Slovakia) Slovan Bratislava	Piraeus, Greece
21:00 CEST (UTC+02:00)	El-Arabi 86'	Report (UEFA); Report (Slovan)	Green 63'	Stadium: Karaiskakis Stadium; Attendance: 15,585; Referee: Lawrence Visser (Belgium)

Thursday, 11 August 2022 Second leg	Slovan Bratislava (Slovakia)	2–2 (a.e.t.) (3–3 agg.) (3–4 p)	(Greece) Olympiacos	Bratislava, Slovakia
20:30 CEST (UTC+02:00)	Šaponjić 90+4'; Abena (yellow card) 66' (yellow-red card) 90+7'; Green 108'	Report (UEFA); Report (Slovan)	Zinckernagel 54'; A. Camara 101'	Stadium: Tehelné pole Attendance: 18,133; Referee: Glenn Nyberg (Sweden)
	Penalties
	Ramírez (penalty scored); Šaponjić (penalty scored); Kucka (penalty missed); Green (penalty scored); Chakvetadze (penalty missed)		(penalty missed) Kunde; (penalty scored) Bouchalakis; (penalty scored) Masouras; (penalty scored) Pipa; (penalty scored) Valbuena

== UEFA Europa Conference League ==
=== Play-off round ===
The draw for the play-off round was held on 2 August 2022.

Thursday, 18 August 2022 First leg	Zrinjski Mostar (Bosnia and Herzegovina)	1–0	(Slovakia) Slovan Bratislava	Mostar, Bosnia and Herzegovina
20:00 CEST (UTC+02:00)	Bilbija 89'	Report (UEFA); Report (Slovan)	Barseghyan (yellow card) 51' (yellow-red card) 69'	Stadium: Stadion pod Bijelim Brijegom; Attendance: 5,100; Referee: Julian Weinberger (Austria)

Thursday, 25 August 2022 Second leg	Slovan Bratislava (Slovakia)	2–1 (a.e.t.) (2–2 agg.) (6–5 p)	(Bosnia and Herzegovina) Zrinjski Mostar	Bratislava, Slovakia
20:30 CEST (UTC+02:00)	Ramírez 67', 120+1'; Kankava (red card) 118'	Report (UEFA); Report (Slovan)	Savić 103'	Stadium: Tehelné pole Attendance: 14,333; Referee: Mohammed Al-Hakim (Sweden)
	Penalties
	Hrnčár (penalty scored); Medved (penalty scored); Mustafić (penalty scored); Abena (penalty scored); Ramírez (penalty scored); Kashia (penalty missed); Čavrić (penalty scored)		(penalty scored) Bilbija; (penalty scored) Kamenar; (penalty scored) Savić; (penalty scored) Maglica; (penalty scored) Jakovljević; (penalty missed) Barišić; (penalty missed) Malekinušić

=== Group stage ===
The draw for the group stage was held on 26 August 2022 with the fixtures announced on a day later.

Pos	Team	Pld	W	D	L	GF	GA	GD	Pts	Qualification	SLO	BSL	PYU	ZAL
1	(Slovakia) Slovan Bratislava	6	3	2	1	9	7	+2	11 (Note: Head-to-head points: Slovan Bratislava 4, Basel 1.)	Advance to round of 16	—	3–3	2–1	0–0
2	(Switzerland) Basel	6	3	2	1	11	9	+2	11	Advance to knockout round play-offs	0–2	—	3–1	2–2
3	(Armenia) Pyunik	6	2	0	4	8	9	−1	6		2–0	1–2	—	2–0
4	(Lithuania) Žalgiris	6	1	2	3	5	8	−3	5		1–2	0–1	2–1	—

Source: UEFA
Rules for classification: Group stage tiebreakers

==== Results by matchday ====
Round	1	2	3	4	5	6
Ground	H	A	A	H	H	A
Result	D	L	W	D	W	W
Position	3	4	3	3	1	1

A = Away; H = Home; W = Win; D = Draw; L = Loss

==== Matches ====
Thursday, 8 September 2022 1	Slovan Bratislava (Slovakia)	0–0	(Lithuania) Žalgiris	Bratislava, Slovakia
21:00 CEST (UTC+02:00)		Report (UEFA); Report (Slovan)		Stadium: Tehelné pole Attendance: 11,227; Referee: Rauf Jabarov (Azerbaijan)

Thursday, 15 September 2022 2	Pyunik (Armenia)	2–0	(Slovakia) Slovan Bratislava	Yerevan, Armenia
18:45 CEST (UTC+02:00)	Dashyan 35'; Otubanjo 36'	Report (UEFA); Report (Slovan)		Stadium: Vazgen Sargsyan Republican Stadium; Attendance: 3,500; Referee: Gal Laibuvitz (Israel)

Thursday, 6 October 2022 3	Basel (Switzerland)	0–2	(Slovakia) Slovan Bratislava	Basel, Switzerland
21:00 CEST (UTC+02:00)	Nuhu (yellow card) 72' (yellow-red card) 90+5'	Report (UEFA); Report (Slovan)	Pauschek 35'; Čavrić 45+1'	Stadium: St. Jakob-Park; Attendance: 14,870; Referee: Kevin Clancy (Scotland)

Thursday, 13 October 2022 4	Slovan Bratislava (Slovakia)	3–3	(Switzerland) Basel	Bratislava, Slovakia
18:45 CEST (UTC+02:00)	Weiss Jr. 45+2' (pen.); Kucka 49'; Čavrić 53'	Report (UEFA); Report (Slovan)	Males 29' (pen.); Diouf 65'; Zeqiri 72'	Stadium: Tehelné pole Attendance: 20,233; Referee: Serhiy Boyko (Ukraine)

Thursday, 27 October 2022 5	Slovan Bratislava (Slovakia)	2–1	(Armenia) Pyunik	Bratislava, Slovakia
21:00 CEST (UTC+02:00)	Kashia 84'; Ramírez 85'	Report (UEFA); Report (Slovan)	Cociuc 64' (pen.)	Stadium: Tehelné pole Attendance: 15,783; Referee: Manuel Schüttengruber (Austria)

Thursday, 3 November 2022 6	Žalgiris (Lithuania)	1–2	(Slovakia) Slovan Bratislava	Vilnius, Lithuania
18:45 CET (UTC+01:00)	Kyeremeh 47'	Report (UEFA); Report (Slovan)	Čavrić 15', 23'; Chakvetadze (penalty missed) 90'	Stadium: LFF Stadium; Attendance: 4,790; Referee: Luis Godinho (Portugal)

=== Knockout phase ===
==== Round of 16 ====
The draw for the round of 16 was held on 24 February 2023.

Thursday, 9 March 2023 First leg	Basel (Switzerland)	2–2	(Slovakia) Slovan Bratislava	Basel, Switzerland
21:00 CET (UTC+01:00)	Amdouni 6'; Zeqiri 40'	Report (UEFA); Report (Slovan)	Medveděv 17'; Malik 70'	Stadium: St. Jakob-Park; Attendance: 13,202; Referee: Rade Obrenović (Slovenia)

Thursday, 16 March 2023 Second leg	Slovan Bratislava (Slovakia)	2–2 (a.e.t.) (4–4 agg.) (1–4 p)	(Switzerland) Basel	Bratislava, Slovakia
18:45 CET (UTC+01:00)	Malik 10'; Kucka 17'	Report (UEFA); Report (Slovan)	Calafiori 53'; Amdouni 90+3'	Stadium: Tehelné pole Attendance: 21,675; Referee: Jakob Kehlet (Denmark)
	Penalties
	Kucka (penalty missed); Barseghyan (penalty missed); Lovat (penalty scored)		(penalty scored) Diouf; (penalty scored) Amdouni; (penalty scored) Calafiori; (penalty scored) Males

== Statistics ==
=== Goalscorers ===
As of match played 20 May 2023

No.	Pos.	Nat.	Name	Fortuna liga	Slovak Cup	Champions League	Europa League	Europa Conference League	Total
2	DF	(Belgium)	Siemen Voet		1				1
3	MF	(Nigeria)	Uche Agbo	1					1
4	DF	(Georgia (country))	Guram Kashia	2		1		1	4
7	MF	(Slovakia)	Vladimír Weiss Jr.	9	1	1		1	11
8	MF	(Hungary)	Dávid Holman	1					1
9	FW	(Serbia)	Ivan Šaponjić	2	1		1		4
10	MF	(Georgia (country))	Giorgi Chakvetadze	1					1
11	MF	(Armenia)	Tigran Barseghyan	5	1	2			8
15	FW	(Ghana)	Abubakari Malik	2	2			2	6
16	MF	(Bosnia and Herzegovina)	Alen Mustafić		1				1
17	DF	(Czech Republic)	Jurij Medveděv					1	1
18	DF	(Slovakia)	David Hrnčár	5	2				7
19	MF	(England)	Andre Green	6	3		2		11
20	MF	(Georgia (country))	Jaba Kankava	1	2				3
21	MF	(Czech Republic)	Jaromír Zmrhal	2	1				3
24	FW	(Venezuela)	Eric Ramírez	3	1			3	7
25	DF	(Slovakia)	Lukáš Pauschek					1	1
33	MF	(Slovakia)	Juraj Kucka	6				2	8
36	DF	(Brazil)	Lucas Lovat	1					1
77	FW	(Serbia)	Aleksandar Čavrić	15	5			4	24
81	DF	(Slovakia)	Vernon De Marco	2		1			3
Own goals				1					1
Total				65	21	5	3	15	109

=== Clean sheets ===
As of match played 20 May 2023

No.	Nat.	Name	Fortuna liga	Slovak Cup	Champions League	Europa League	Europa Conference League	Total
1	(Slovakia)	Adrián Chovan	6	1	1		2	10
31	(Slovakia)	Martin Trnovský	5					5
32	(Slovakia)	Branislav Chudík		1				1
35	(Slovakia)	Adam Hrdina	1					1
Total (Note: In the 9th round of Fortuna liga match against Dukla Banská Bystrica, the goalkeeper Martin Trnovský was injured and replaced by Adrián Chovan in the 35th minute when the score was 0–0. Slovan eventually won the match 1–0, and thus both goalkeepers kept a clean sheet in one match. For this reason, the sum of their individual clean sheets is higher than the total number of clean sheets.)			11	2	1	0	2	16

=== Attendances ===
As of match played 20 May 2023

	Matches	Attendances	Average	High	Low
Fortuna liga	16	95,618	5,976	15,606	2,689
Slovak Cup	1	2,157	2,157	2,157	2,157
Champions League	2	32,089	16,045	21,500	10,589
Europa League	1	18,133	18,133	18,133	18,133
Europa Conference League	5	83,251	16,650	21,675	11,227
Total	25	231,248	9,250	21,675	2,157

== Awards ==
=== Fortuna liga Player of the Month ===
Month	Player	Ref
November	(Serbia) Aleksandar Čavrić	
April	(Serbia) Aleksandar Čavrić	

=== Fortuna liga Goal of the Month ===
Month	Player	Ref
April	(Slovakia) Vladimír Weiss Jr.	

=== Fortuna liga Team of the Season ===
Position	Player	Ref
DF	(Czech Republic) Jurij Medveděv	
DF	(Georgia (country)) Guram Kashia	
DF	(Brazil) Lucas Lovat	
MF	(Slovakia) Juraj Kucka	
MF	(Slovakia) Vladimír Weiss Jr.	
FW	(Serbia) Aleksandar Čavrić	

=== Fortuna liga Player of the Season ===
Season	Player	Ref
2022–23	(Slovakia) Vladimír Weiss Jr.	

=== Fortuna liga Manager of the Season ===
Season	Manager	Ref
2022–23	(Slovakia) Vladimír Weiss	
