= Siemen Voet =

Belgian footballer (born 2000)

Personal information
- Date of birth: 3 February 2000 (age 26)
- Place of birth: Lochristi, Belgium
- Height: 1.90 m (6 ft 3 in)
- Position: Centre-back

Team information
- Current team: 1. FC Saarbrücken
- Number: 4

Youth career
- Lochristi
- Lokeren
- –2019: Club NXT

Senior career*
| Years | Team | Apps | (Gls) |
| 2019–2021 | Club Brugge | 0 | (0) |
| 2019–2020 | → Roeselare (loan) | 24 | (2) |
| 2020–2021 | → Mechelen (loan) | 9 | (1) |
| 2021–2022 | PEC Zwolle | 17 | (0) |
| 2022–2025 | Slovan Bratislava | 27 | (0) |
| 2023–2024 | → Fortuna Sittard (loan) | 21 | (0) |
| 2025–2026 | TSV 1860 Munich | 37 | (0) |
| 2026– | 1. FC Saarbrücken | 0 | (0) |

International career
| 2017 | Belgium U17 | 1 | (0) |
- * Club domestic league appearances and goals as of 28 May 2026

Siemen Voet (born 3 February 2000) is a Belgian professional footballer who plays as a centre-back for German 3. Liga club 1. FC Saarbrücken.

== Club career ==
On 1 September 2023, Voet joined Fortuna Sittard in the Netherlands on loan.

In June 2025, Voet moved to TSV 1860 Munich in German 3. Liga.

== Personal life ==
Voet was in a relationship with gymnast Nina Derwael. While he scored the opening goal in a 3–1 win against Oud-Heverlee Leuven on 12 October 2019, Derwael became World Champion just some minutes later.

== Career statistics ==
As of match played 10 May 2025

Appearances and goals by club, season and competition
| Club | Season | League | | | Cup | | Europe | | Other | | Total | |
| Club | Season | Division | Apps | Goals | Apps | Goals | Apps | Goals | Apps | Goals | Apps | Goals |
|---|---|---|---|---|---|---|---|---|---|---|---|---|
| Club Brugge | 2019–20 | Belgian Pro League | 0 | 0 | 0 | 0 | 0 | 0 | 0 | 0 | 0 | 0 |
| Roeselare (loan) | 2019–20 | Challenger Pro League | 24 | 2 | 1 | 0 | — | | — | | 25 | 2 |
| Mechelen (loan) | 2020–21 | Belgian Pro League | 9 | 1 | 1 | 0 | — | | 0 | 0 | 10 | 1 |
| PEC Zwolle | 2021–22 | Eredivisie | 17 | 0 | 2 | 1 | — | | — | | 19 | 1 |
| Slovan Bratislava | 2022–23 | Slovak First Football League | 10 | 0 | 6 | 1 | 0 | 0 | 0 | 0 | 16 | 1 |
| Slovan Bratislava | 2023–24 | Slovak First Football League | 1 | 0 | 0 | 0 | 0 | 0 | 0 | 0 | 1 | 0 |
| Slovan Bratislava | 2024–25 | Slovak First Football League | 16 | 0 | 6 | 0 | 3 (Note: Appearances in UEFA Champions League) | 0 | — | | 25 | 0 |
| Slovan Bratislava | Total | | 27 | 0 | 12 | 1 | 3 | 0 | 0 | 0 | 42 | 1 |
| Slovan Bratislava B | 2022–23 | 2. Liga | 6 | 0 | — | | — | | — | | 6 | 0 |
| Slovan Bratislava B | 2023–24 | 2. Liga | 1 | 0 | — | | — | | — | | 1 | 0 |
| Slovan Bratislava B | Total | | 7 | 0 | — | | — | | — | | 7 | 0 |
| Fortuna Sittard (loan) | 2023–24 | Eredivisie | 21 | 0 | 4 | 0 | — | | — | | 25 | 0 |
| Career total | | | 105 | 3 | 20 | 2 | 3 | 0 | 0 | 0 | 128 | 5 |
