= Zuberu Sharani =

Ghanaian footballer

Personal information
- Date of birth: 7 January 2000 (age 26)
- Place of birth: Accra, Ghana
- Height: 1.85 m (6 ft 1 in)
- Positions: Forward; winger; left-back

Team information
- Current team: Hapoel Jerusalem

Youth career
- –2018: Dreams
- 2018–2019: Sparta Prague (loan)

Senior career*
Years	Team	Apps	(Gls)
2018	Dreams	12	(4)
2018–2019	Sparta Prague	0	(0)
2019–2022	DAC Dunajská Streda	41	(5)
2021	→ Zemplín Michalovce (loan)	11	(2)
2023–2026	Slovan Bratislava	52	(1)
2023–2026	Slovan Bratislava B	5	(1)
2026–	Hapoel Jerusalem	5	(0)

International career^{‡}
2026–	Togo	2	(0)
- * Club domestic league appearances and goals as of 12 October 2026 ‡ National team caps and goals as of 29 September 2026

Zuberu Sharani (born 7 January 2000) is a professional footballer who plays as a left-back or a winger for Israeli Premier League club Hapoel Jerusalem. Born in Ghana, he represents Togo internationally.

== Club career ==
=== Dunajská Streda ===
Sharani made his Fortuna Liga debut for DAC Dunajská Streda against Žilina on 29 September 2019. Sharani came on as a late second-half substitute, replacing Eric Ramírez. DAC won the game 1−0 thanks to a first-half goal by Eric Davis.

Sharani scored DAC's 1000th top division goal on 27 August 2021 in an away fixture against Pohronie, sealing the 3−0 victory following earlier goals by András Schäfer and Milan Dimun.

== International career ==
Born in Ghana, Sharani is of Togolese descent. He was called up to the Togo national team in March 2026.

On 25 September 2026, Sharani made his debut for the Togo national team in an AFCON qualifier against Burundi.

== Career statistics ==
As of match played 29 July 2026

Appearances and goals by club, season and competition
Club	Season	League			National cup		Europe		Other		Total	
Club	Season	Division	Apps	Goals	Apps	Goals	Apps	Goals	Apps	Goals	Apps	Goals
Dreams	2017–18	Ghana Premier League	12	4	—		—		—		12	4
Sparta Prague	2018–19	Czech First League	0	0	0	0	0	0	0	0	0	0
1914 Šamorín (loan)	2. Liga	2. Liga	10	5	—		—		—		10	5
DAC Dunajská Streda	2019–20	Slovak First Football League	5	1	2	0	—		—		7	1
DAC Dunajská Streda	2020–21	Slovak First Football League	5	0	0	0	—		—		5	0
DAC Dunajská Streda	2021–22	Slovak First Football League	31	4	1	1	2 (Note: Appearances in UEFA Conference League)	0	—		34	5
DAC Dunajská Streda	Total		41	5	3	1	2	0	—		46	6
Zemplín Michalovce (loan)	2020–21	Slovak First Football League	11	2	1	0	—		—		12	2
Slovan Bratislava	2022–23	Slovak First Football League	9	0	5	0	1	0	0	0	15	0
Slovan Bratislava	2023–24	Slovak First Football League	17	0	3	1	9 (Note: Six appearances and two goals in UEFA Champions League, two appearances in UEFA Europa League, one appearance in UEFA Conference League)	2	0	0	29	3
Slovan Bratislava	2024–25	Slovak First Football League	19	1	3	1	12 (Note: Appearances in UEFA Champions League)	0	0	0	34	2
Slovan Bratislava	2025–26	Slovak First Football League	7	0	1	0	2 (Note: One appearance in UEFA Champions League)	0	—		10	0
Slovan Bratislava	2026–27	Slovak First Football League	0	0	0	0	2	0	—		2	0
Slovan Bratislava	Total		52	1	12	2	26	2	0	0	90	5
Hapoel Jerusalem	2026–27	Israeli Premier League	0	0	0	0	0	0	0	0	0	0
Hapoel Jerusalem	Total		0	0	0	0	0	0	0	0	0	0
Career total			126	17	16	3	28	2	0	0	170	22
