= Vladimír Weiss (footballer, born 1989) =

Slovak footballer

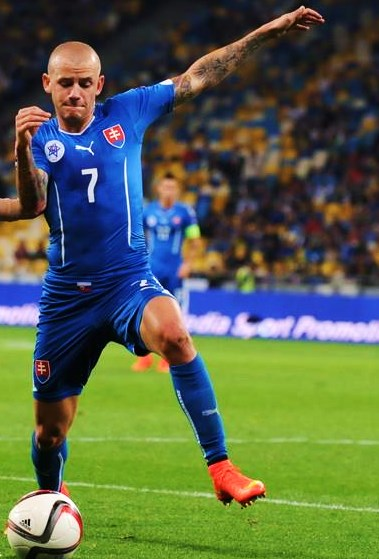
- Weiss playing for Slovakia in 2014

Personal information
- Date of birth: 30 November 1989 (age 36)
- Place of birth: Bratislava, Czechoslovakia
- Height: 1.73 m (5 ft 8 in)
- Positions: Winger; attacking midfielder

Team information
- Current team: Slovakia (assistant)

Youth career
- 1999–2005: Inter Bratislava
- 2006–2009: Manchester City

Senior career*
Years	Team	Apps	(Gls)
2009–2012	Manchester City	1	(0)
2010	→ Bolton Wanderers (loan)	13	(0)
2010–2011	→ Rangers (loan)	23	(5)
2011–2012	→ Espanyol (loan)	28	(3)
2012–2013	Pescara	22	(4)
2013–2014	Olympiacos	17	(4)
2014–2016	Lekhwiya	43	(20)
2016–2019	Al-Gharafa	59	(25)
2020–2026	Slovan Bratislava	118	(24)
Total		324	(85)

International career
2007	Slovakia U19	3	(0)
2008–2009	Slovakia U21	8	(1)
2009–2022	Slovakia	77	(8)
- * Club domestic league appearances and goals

Vladimír Weiss (Slovak pronunciation: [ˈʋlaɟimiːr ˈʋajs]; born 30 November 1989) is Slovak former professional footballer who played as a winger or an attacking midfielder. The third Vladimír Weiss to play for his country, he comes from a footballing background with his grandfather and father both having played for the senior national team. He scored 8 goals in 77 national team appearances between 2009 and 2022.

== Club career ==
=== Manchester City ===
On 16 April 2008, Weiss scored in the second leg of the 2008 FA Youth Cup final against Chelsea, in a 3–1 (4–2 on aggregate) victory. On 24 May 2009, he made his first-team debut by coming as a substitute to Stephen Ireland after 70 minutes in the final game of the 2008–09 season, which was a 1–0 victory against Bolton Wanderers. On 2 December 2009, he scored his first senior goal as a substitute in a 3–0 League Cup victory against Arsenal. He signed a new contract on 17 December 2009, to tie him to the club until 2012.

==== Bolton Wanderers (loan) ====
On 25 January 2010, Weiss joined Bolton Wanderers on loan until the end of the season. The next day, he debuted as a substitute in a 1–0 home victory against Burnley.

==== Rangers (loan) ====
On 19 August 2010, Weiss joined Scottish side Rangers on loan until the end of the 2010–11 season. Prior to signing for Rangers, Weiss rejected a move to their city rivals Celtic. He made his Rangers debut against Hibernian at Easter Road on 22 August coming on as a substitute for James Beattie, setting up the second goal with Rangers going on to win 3–0. He scored his first goal for Rangers in a 4–1 home victory against Motherwell and five days later made his Champions League debut against Valencia, providing the assist from a corner for Maurice Edu's opener.

On 26 December 2010, Weiss gave a 'Man of the Match' performance, and scored the third goal in a 4–1 SPL victory over Motherwell at Fir Park. On 15 January 2011, Weiss scored twice in a 4–0 home victory over Hamilton Academical. On 20 March 2011, Weiss came off the bench in the League Cup final against Celtic and made the assist for Nikica Jelavić to score the winning goal, he lifted his first senior trophy as a Rangers player. Weiss claimed a 2010–11 SPL winners medal, Rangers having won the title over rivals Celtic by a single point.

==== Espanyol (loan) ====
In February 2012, Weiss scored with a "wonderful dipping shot from 30 yards" in a 3–3 away draw against Athletic Bilbao.

=== Pescara ===
On 2 August 2012, newly-promoted Serie A club Pescara announced the signing of Weiss from Manchester City on a year contract with the option for a further year. The same year on 26 September, he scored the only goal of Pescara's 1–0 victory against Palermo, after coming off the bench in the second half.

=== Olympiacos ===
After rejecting numerous offers from clubs in Italy, Spain, England, and Russia, Weiss came to Greece to sign with current league champion – Olympiacos – on 28 June 2013. Hours later, he announced through his Twitter account that he was joining Olympiacos in a three-year deal. He stated: "I chose Olympiacos because it's a great club with great history, their playing in the Champions League and I know they have Crazy fans! Fanatics with the team. I like to play in front of crazy fans because I'm a little crazy too. I also know that Olympiacos has lofty goals, and if I stay many years with the club, I want to win titles."

Weiss scored his first goal for the club on 1 September 2013 in a league match against Levadiakos. On 17 September 2013, Weiss scored his first Champions League goal in a 4–1 home defeat against Paris Saint-Germain. The goal was voted by ESPN as UEFA Champions League best goal of Matchday 1: he "broke down the right and skipped past four challenges – including a sumptuous nutmeg on 19-year-old PSG debutant Marquinhos – before beating Salvatore Sirigu with the aid of a deflection."

=== Qatar ===
On 26 January 2014, Weiss joined Qatari football club Lekhwiya for a fee of 5.3 million Euros.

In January 2016, Weiss signed a four-and-a-half-year contract with another Qatar Stars League club, Al Gharafa. He left Lekhwiya in December 2019 by mutual agreement, but failed to live up to the expectations at the former club.

=== Slovan Bratislava ===
After a goalless draw in a derby match against Spartak Trnava on 16 February 2020, CEO of Slovan Bratislava Ivan Kmotrík announced that Weiss had joined the leading team of the Fortuna Liga. Conditions of the signing or Weiss' expected first appearance remained unannounced.

In the previous weeks, Weiss had prepared with Železiarne Podbrezová of 2. Liga, to catch up on his deficits caused by a prolonged injury. Due to the COVID-19 pandemic, Fortuna Liga was suspended. Thanks to this arrangement, Weiss eventually underwent a necessary surgery and take part in complete training sessions prior to league's recommencement.

On 19 May 2021, Weiss scored the winning goal, and was subsequently sent off, in the 2021 Slovak Cup Final to ensure a second straight domestic double for Slovan Bratislava.

On 2 October 2024, following Slovan Bratislava's 4-0 defeat to Manchester City in the UEFA Champions League group stage, Weiss announced his retirement from professional football. In mid-December of that year, Weiss reversed his decision and featured in a 2–1 win against Dunajská Streda, playing until the 79th minute.

== International career ==
On 12 August 2009, Weiss debuted for Slovakia in a 1–1 friendly draw against Iceland, replacing Róbert Vittek at the 63rd minute. He was included in Slovakia's 23-man squad for the 2010 World Cup in South Africa.

Weiss played in three out of four of his country's games in South Africa, playing a total of 270 minutes. He impressed in the first match against New Zealand where he thrilled the crowd in a 1–1 draw. Weiss featured in the second group game against Paraguay which they lost 2–0 and played a full 90 minutes in the 2–1 defeat to Netherlands in the last 16. Weiss scored the opening goal in a Euro 2016 victory against Russia, and thus became the first player to score at the Euros whilst playing for a non-European club.

On 18 May 2021, Weiss was included in the final 26-man squad to represent Slovakia at the rescheduled UEFA Euro 2020 tournament. Weiss appeared as a substitute in the group stage games against Sweden and Spain. Weiss remained in the table of Top 10 national team capped players with 77 starts, until he was overtaken by Milan Škriniar, after he collected his 78th start on 20 March 2025.

=== Initial retirement ===
On 21 November 2018, Weiss announced his retirement from the national team at the age of 28 after an altercation with newly appointed national team coach Pavel Hapal. The former was angry after being left on the bench on Nations League matches against Ukraine and Czech Republic. During the latter match he stormed off into the locker room mid-match, following Hapal's last substitution, apparently quitting national as he did so.

In February 2020 it was reported that Weiss and Hapal had met over a year after the incident and discussed Weiss' future career prospects, as he was released from his contract in Al Gharafa in December 2019. Following the meeting Hapal had confirmed that he will consider Weiss, who in 2019 had re-expressed a desire to play internationally, in the national team nominations, assuming he finds a club and performs sufficiently. Later in February, Weiss had signed with Slovan Bratislava.

== Personal life ==
Weiss is a third generation international footballer. His father, also called Vladimír Weiss, gained 31 international caps, and is the first manager to lead Slovakia to a World Cup finals. Weiss' father, as manager of the Slovakia national football team at the time, notably gave his son his national team debut, and selected him for the Slovakia squad at the 2010 World Cup. Speaking to the press before the match against New Zealand, Weiss' father said of Weiss, "He is a very clever boy but it is not easy for him because his coach is his father. And he is not an easy player to coach, but I am sure he will show an excellent performance and will help his team." Weiss would later be coached by his father again when the latter returned to Slovan Bratislava as manager in May 2021.

His grandfather, also named Vladimír Weiss (1939–2018), also represented Czechoslovakia.

== Controversy ==
=== Early controversy ===
In September 2012, after returning from a World Cup qualifying game in Vilnius against Lithuania (1-1), Weiss, Marek Hamšík, Miroslav Stoch and Karim Guédé, were fined and cautioned after visiting a night club, although coaches Stanislav Griga and Michal Hipp kept the incident on a low profile.

On 2 January 2015, together with former Slovak national team player Filip Šebo and several other people, Weiss had a conflict in a fast food restaurant. In October that year, Weiss was among Slovakia squad members celebrating qualification for UEFA Euro 2016 at a hotel in Luxembourg City. After resultant damage to hotel property and intervention from the police, the Slovak Football Association had to pay compensation.

On 2 October 2016, police in Bratislava stopped a Mercedes G owned by Weiss with 11 people on board. Weiss refused an alcohol test and spent 32 hours at a police station. Slovak national team coach Ján Kozák subsequently banned him for two matches. Although he had criminal charges presented by the police against him, the public prosecutor had found that Weiss did not commit the acts of which he was accused and hence he was not prosecuted or tried.

=== 2018 ===
Weiss was called up for matches against Czech Republic and Sweden on 13 and 16 October 2018, respectively.

Weiss violated the code of conduct of national team player, along with Martin Dúbravka, Michal Šulla, Milan Škriniar, Norbert Gyömbér, Ľubomír Šatka and Stanislav Lobotka. On the night of 13 October 2018, after a loss in Slovakia's second UEFA Nations League fixture and a derby match against Czech Republic (1–2), they left the hotel and went out, missed the bedtime and violated the wellness policy, regarding regeneration and rehabilitation. They were allegedly noticed by Ján Kozák at midnight, admitting to the incident and apologising the next day. Kozák resigned from the national team in the afternoon of 14 October, revealing the details of his decision in a press conference on 18 October, to avoid distractions during the preparation for the fixture against Sweden, that was led by his former assistant Štefan Tarkovič on a caretaker basis. Kozák cited his inability to work with the squad under such conditions as the primary reason, as about a third of the squad was involved, including players Kozák described as crucial for the future of Slovak football, with Weiss among them. The President of Slovak Football Association, Ján Kováčik, had punished the players by withholding any financial rewards for any future nominations and performances with the national team, during the upcoming qualification cycle. Kozák also revealed, that upon inquiring the reasons for such conduct, Weiss simply said that he does not know why.

On 19 October, Slovak Football Association published series of statements made by the concerned players, in which they apologised and accepted their guilt. However, Weiss did not provide a statement until the following day, expressing his sincere apologies, for damaging the reputation of Slovak football, acknowledging the negative perception of the incident, accepting the consequences and committing himself to improving the damaged trust. He also stressed his apologies to Kozák and thanked him for his contributions.

== Career statistics ==
=== Club ===
As of match played 16 May 2026

Appearances and goals by club, season and competition
Club	Season	League			National cup (Note: Includes FA Cup, Scottish Cup, Copa del Rey, Coppa Italia, Greek Football Cup, Qatari Stars Cup, Slovak Cup)		League cup (Note: Includes Football League Cup, Scottish League Cup)		Continental		Total	
Club	Season	Division	Apps	Goals	Apps	Goals	Apps	Goals	Apps	Goals	Apps	Goals
Manchester City	2008–09	Premier League	1	0	—		—		—		1	0
Manchester City	2009–10	Premier League	—		1	0	3	1	—		4	1
Manchester City	Total		1	0	1	0	3	1	—		5	1
Bolton Wanderers (loan)	2009–10	Premier League	13	0	—		—		—		13	0
Rangers (loan)	2010–11	Scottish Premier League	23	5	2	0	4	0	6 (Note: Three appearances in UEFA Champions League, three appearances in UEFA Europa League)	0	35	5
Espanyol (loan)	2011–12	La Liga	28	3	3	1	—		—		31	4
Pescara	2012–13	Serie A	22	4	1	1	—		—		23	5
Olympiacos	2013–14	Super League Greece	17	4	3	1	—		5 (Note: Appearances in UEFA Champions League)	1	25	6
Lekhwiya SC	2013–14	Qatar Stars League	7	4	0	0	—		7 (Note: Appearances in AFC Champions League)	1	14	5
Lekhwiya SC	2014–15	Qatar Stars League	22	8	—		—		9	2	31	10
Lekhwiya SC	2015–16	Qatar Stars League	14	8	—		—		0	0	14	8
Lekhwiya SC	Total		43	20	0	0	—		16	3	59	23
Al-Gharafa	2015–16	Qatar Stars League	10	2	0	0	0	0	0	0	10	2
Al-Gharafa	2016–17	Qatar Stars League	21	10	—		—		0	0	21	10
Al-Gharafa	2017–18	Qatar Stars League	7	5	—		—		0	0	7	5
Al-Gharafa	2018–19	Qatar Stars League	19	8	5	2	—		1	0	25	10
Al-Gharafa	2019–20	Qatar Stars League	2	0	3	0	—		—		5	0
Al-Gharafa	Total		59	25	8	2	—		1	0	68	27
Slovan Bratislava	2019–20	Slovak Super Liga	3	0	3	1	—		—		6	1
Slovan Bratislava	2020–21	Slovak Super Liga	17	3	4	2	—		—		21	5
Slovan Bratislava	2021–22	Slovak Super Liga	20	7	3	0	—		11 (Note: Four appearances and one goal in UEFA Champions League, three appearances in UEFA Europa League, four appearances in UEFA Europa Conference League)	1	34	8
Slovan Bratislava	2022–23	Slovak Super Liga	20	9	6	1	—		11	2	37	12
Slovan Bratislava	2023–24	Slovak Super Liga	14	2	1	0	—		8 (Note: Three appearances and three goals in UEFA Champions League, one appearance in UEFA Europa League, four appearances and one goal in UEFA Europa Conference League)	4	23	6
Slovan Bratislava	2024–25	Slovak Super Liga	18	1	1	0	—		11	2	30	3
Slovan Bratislava	2025–26	Slovak Super Liga	26	2	4	3	—		6 (Note: Four appearances in UEFA Champions League, two appearances in UEFA Conference League)	0	36	5
Slovan Bratislava	Total		118	24	22	7	—		47	9	187	40
Career total			324	85	40	12	7	1	75	13	446	111

=== International ===
As of match played 10 June 2022

Appearances and goals by national team and year
National team	Year	Apps	Goals
Slovakia	2009	6	0
Slovakia	2010	11	1
Slovakia	2011	6	0
Slovakia	2012	5	1
Slovakia	2013	4	0
Slovakia	2014	9	1
Slovakia	2015	7	1
Slovakia	2016	10	1
Slovakia	2017	6	2
Slovakia	2018	3	0
Slovakia	2021	7	0
Slovakia	2022	3	1
Total		77	8

Scores and results list Slovakia's goal tally first, score column indicates score after each Weiss goal.

List of international goals scored by Vladimír Weiss
No.	Date	Venue	Opponent	Score	Result	Competition
1	8 October 2010	Hanrapetakan Stadium, Yerevan, Armenia	Armenia	1–1	1–3	UEFA Euro 2012 qualification
2	29 February 2012	Bursa Atatürk Stadium, Bursa, Turkey	Turkey	1–0	2–1	Friendly
3	23 May 2014	NTC Senec, Senec, Slovakia	Montenegro	1–0	2–0	Friendly
4	27 March 2015	Štadión pod Dubňom, Žilina, Slovakia	Luxembourg	2–0	3–0	UEFA Euro 2016 qualification
5	15 June 2016	Stade Pierre-Mauroy, Lille, France	Russia	1–0	2–1	UEFA Euro 2016
6	26 March 2017	Ta'Qali National Stadium, Ta'Qali, Malta	Malta	1–0	3–1	2018 FIFA World Cup qualification
7	10 June 2017	LFF Stadium, Vilnius, Lithuania	Lithuania	1–0	2–1	2018 FIFA World Cup qualification
8	10 June 2022	Dalga Arena, Baku, Azerbaijan	Azerbaijan	1–0	1–0	2022–23 UEFA Nations League C

== Honours ==
=== Club ===
Rangers

- Scottish Premier League: 2010–11
- Scottish League Cup: 2010–11

Olympiacos

- Super League Greece: 2013–14

Lekhwiya

- Qatar Stars League: 2013–14, 2014–15
- Qatar Cup: 2015
- Qatar Super Cup: 2015

Al-Gharafa

- Qatari Stars Cup: 2017–18, 2018–19

Slovan Bratislava

- Slovak First Football League: 2019–20, 2020–21, 2021–22, 2022–23, 2023–24, 2024–25, 2025–26
- Slovak Cup: 2019–20, 2020–21

=== Individual ===
- Slovak First Football League Player of the Season: 2021–22, 2022–23
- Slovak Super Liga Team of the Season: 2021–22, 2022–23
- Slovak Super Liga Player of the Month: March 2022
- Slovak Super Liga Goal of the Month: April 2023
