= Lukáš Pauschek =

Slovak footballer

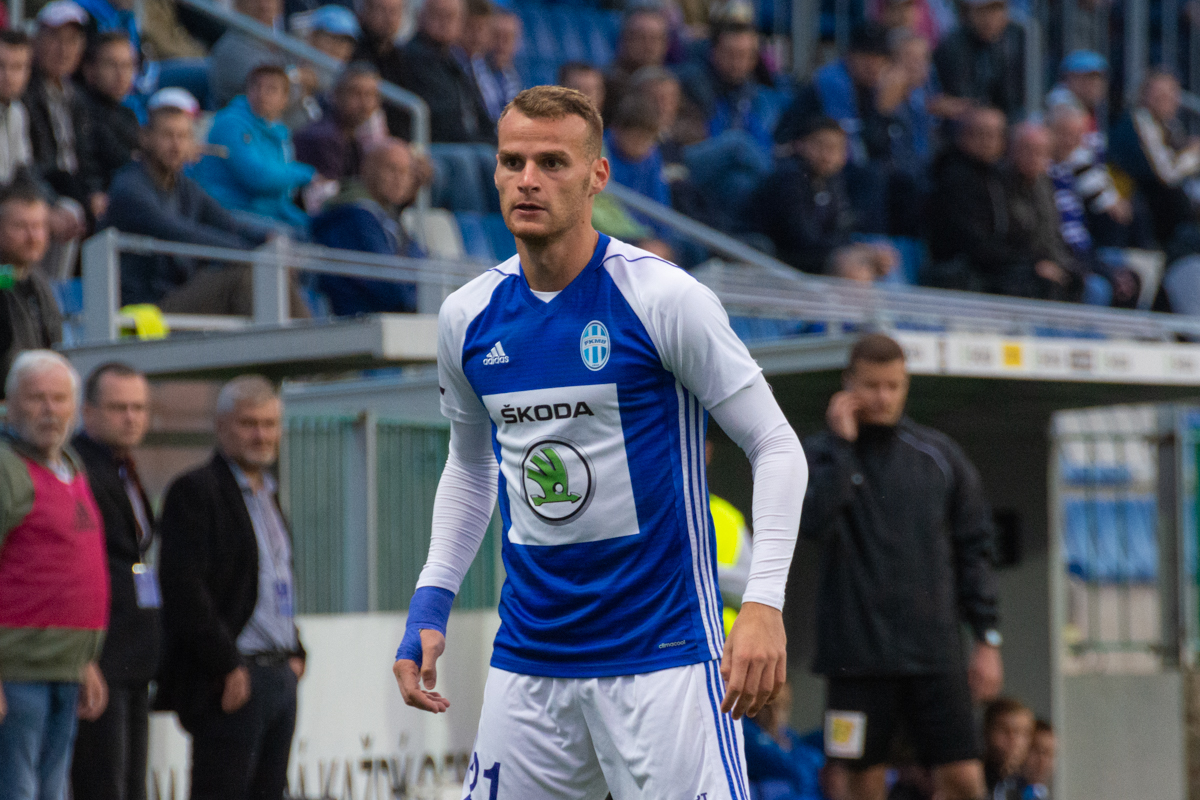

Personal information
- Full name: Lukáš Pauschek
- Date of birth: 9 December 1992 (age 33)
- Place of birth: Bratislava, Czechoslovakia
- Height: 1.80 m (5 ft 11 in)
- Position: Right back

Team information
- Current team: Michalovce
- Number: 25

Youth career
- Slovan Bratislava

Senior career*
Years	Team	Apps	(Gls)
2011–2013	Slovan Bratislava	51	(1)
2013–2015	Sparta Prague	0	(0)
2014–2015	→ Bohemians 1905 (loan)	56	(0)
2016–2018	Mladá Boleslav	75	(1)
2019–2025	Slovan Bratislava	96	(1)
2025–	Zemplín Michalovce	27	(0)

International career^{‡}
2011–2015	Slovakia U21	27	(2)
2012–	Slovakia	6	(0)
- * Club domestic league appearances and goals as of 21 September 2026 ‡ National team caps and goals as of 30 March 2021

Lukáš Pauschek (born 9 December 1992) is a Slovak footballer who plays as right back for Zemplín Michalovce.

== International career ==
On 6 August 2012, Pauschek was called up to the senior team for the first time by new managers Michal Hipp and Stanislav Griga for the team's friendly match against Denmark on 15 August 2012. He made his international debut in the match starting as a left back; Slovakia won 3–1. Pauschek returned to the national team under Pavel Hapal but did not make an appearance during the autumn of 2020. Pauschek eventually returned to international gameplay after more than 4 years under Štefan Tarkovič on 30 March 2021 in a home World Cup qualifier against Russia. He came on as a second-half stoppage time replacement for Peter Pekarík during the 2-1 victory, which saw an improved performance from Slovakia following two upsetting ties with Cyprus and Malta in previous days.

== Career statistics ==
=== Club ===
As of match played 17 May 2025

Appearances and goals by club, season and competition
Club	Season	League			Cup		Europe		Other		Total	
Club	Season	Division	Apps	Goals	Apps	Goals	Apps	Goals	Apps	Goals	Apps	Goals
Slovan Bratislava	2010–11	Slovak First Football League	12	0	3	0	—		—		15	0
Slovan Bratislava	2011–12	Slovak First Football League	14	0	1	0	6 (Note: One appearance in UEFA Champions League, five appearances in UEFA Europa League)	0	—		21	0
Slovan Bratislava	2012–13	Slovak First Football League	14	0	1	0	6 (Note: One appearance in UEFA Champions League, five appearances in UEFA Europa League)	0	—		21	0
Slovan Bratislava	Total		26	0	4	0	6	0	—		36	0
Sparta Prague	2013–14	Czech First League	0	0	2	0	2 (Note: Appearances in UEFA Europa League)	0	0	0	4	0
Bohemians (loan)	2013–14	Czech First League	13	0	0	0	—		—		13	0
Bohemians (loan)	2014–15	Czech First League	28	0	0	0	—		—		28	0
Bohemians (loan)	2015–16	Czech First League	15	0	1	0	—		—		16	0
Bohemians (loan)	Total		56	0	1	0	—		—		57	0
Mladá Boleslav	2015–16	Czech First League	5	0	2	0	—		—		7	0
Mladá Boleslav	2016–17	Czech First League	22	0	1	0	2	0	—		25	0
Mladá Boleslav	2017–18	Czech First League	29	1	3	0	3	0	—		35	1
Mladá Boleslav	2018–19	Czech First League	19	0	1	0	—		—		20	0
Mladá Boleslav	Total		75	1	7	0	5	0	—		87	1
Slovan Bratislava	2019–20	Czech First League	9	0	3	0	—		—		12	0
Slovan Bratislava	2020–21	Czech First League	25	0	5	0	1	0	0	0	31	0
Slovan Bratislava	2021–22	Czech First League	14	0	2	0	8 (Note: Two appearances in UEFA Champions League, two appearances in UEFA Europa League, two appearances in UEFA Conference League)	0	0	0	24	0
Slovan Bratislava	2022–23	Czech First League	13	0	3	0	12 (Note: Three appearances in UEFA Champions League, two appearances in UEFA Europa League, seven appearances and one goal in UEFA Conference League)	1	0	0	28	1
Slovan Bratislava	2023–24	Czech First League	25	1	3	0	11 (Note: Five appearances in UEFA Champions League, six appearances in UEFA Conference League)	0	0	0	39	1
Slovan Bratislava	2024–25	Czech First League	10	0	3	0	3 (Note: Appearances in UEFA Champions League)	0	0	0	16	0
Slovan Bratislava	Total		96	1	19	0	35	1	0	0	150	1
Career total			253	2	33	0	48	1	0	0	334	3

=== International ===
As of match played 30 March 2021

Appearances and goals by national team and year
National team	Year	Apps	Goals
Slovakia	2012	1	0
Slovakia	2013	3	0
Slovakia	2016	1	0
Slovakia	2021	1	0
Total		6	0

== Honours ==
=== Club ===
Slovan Bratislava

- Fortuna Liga (6): 2010–11, 2012–13, 2019–20, 2020–21, 2021–22, 2022–23
- Slovnaft Cup (4): 2010–11, 2012–13, 2019–20, 2020–21

Mlada Boleslav

- Czech Cup (1): 2015-16
