= Malik Abubakari =

Ghanaian footballer (born 2000)

Personal information
- Full name: Abdul Malik Abubakari
- Date of birth: 10 May 2000 (age 26)
- Place of birth: Accra, Ghana
- Height: 1.85 m (6 ft 1 in)
- Position: Forward

Team information
- Current team: Torreense
- Number: 27

Youth career
- 2016–2018: Charity Stars
- 2018–2019: Vizela

Senior career*
Years	Team	Apps	(Gls)
2019–2021	Moreirense	0	(0)
2019–2020	→ Fafe (loan)	23	(9)
2020–2021	→ Casa Pia (loan)	32	(11)
2021–2024	Malmö FF	23	(5)
2022	→ HJK (loan)	11	(1)
2023	→ Slovan Bratislava (loan)	27	(3)
2024	→ Viborg (loan)	13	(2)
2024–2026	Lyngby	20	(0)
2026–	Torreense	2	(1)
- * Club domestic league appearances and goals as of 11 September 2026

Abdul Malik Abubakari (born 10 May 2000) is a Ghanaian footballer who plays as a forward for Liga Portugal 2 club Torreense.

== Career statistics ==
As of 3 December 2024

Club	Season	League			Cup		Continental		Total	
Club	Season	Division	Apps	Goals	Apps	Goals	Apps	Goals	Apps	Goals
Moreirense	2019–20	Primeira Liga	0	0	0	0	—		0	0
Moreirense	2020–21	Primeira Liga	0	0	0	0	—		0	0
Moreirense	Total		0	0	0	0	0	0	0	0
Fafe (loan)	2019–20	Campeonato de Portugal	23	9	2 (Note: Appearances in the Taça de Portugal)	0	—		25	9
Casa Pia (loan)	2020–21	Liga Portugal 2	32	11	1	0	—		33	11
Malmö FF	2021	Allsvenskan	15	3	1 (Note: Appearances in Svenska Cupen)	1	8 (Note: Appearances in UEFA Champions League)	0	24	4
Malmö FF	2022	Allsvenskan	8	2	6	2	0	0	14	4
Malmö FF	Total		23	5	7	3	8	0	38	8
HJK Helsinki (loan)	2022	Veikkausliiga	11	1	0	0	12 (Note: Appearances in UEFA Champions League and UEFA Europa League)	1	23	2
Slovan Bratislava (loan)	2022–23	Slovak First League	14	2	5 (Note: Appearances in Slovak Cup)	2	2 (Note: Appearances in UEFA Europa Conference League)	2	21	6
Slovan Bratislava (loan)	2023–24	Slovak First League	13	1	3	3	11 (Note: Appearances in UEFA Champions League, UEFA Europa League and UEFA Europa Conference League)	0	27	4
Slovan Bratislava (loan)	Total		22	3	8	5	13	2	48	10
Viborg FF (loan)	2023–24	Danish Superliga	8	2	0	0	—		8	2
Lyngby	2024–25	Danish Superliga	13	0	1	0	–		14	0
Career total			143	31	19	8	33	3	190	43

== Honours ==
Malmö FF

- Allsvenskan: 2021
- Svenska Cupen: 2021–22

HJK

- Veikkausliiga: 2022

ŠK Slovan Bratislava

- Slovak First League: 2022–23

Lyngby

- Danish 1st Division: 2025–26
