= Martin Trnovský =

Slovak footballer

Personal information
- Full name: Martin Trnovský
- Date of birth: 7 June 2000 (age 26)
- Place of birth: Bratislava, Slovakia
- Height: 1.91 m (6 ft 3 in)
- Position: Goalkeeper

Team information
- Current team: Podbrezová
- Number: 31

Youth career
- 2008–2019: Slovan Bratislava

Senior career*
Years	Team	Apps	(Gls)
2019–	Slovan Bratislava B	45	(0)
2019–2026	Slovan Bratislava	36	(0)
2026–	Podbrezová	4	(0)

International career
2016–2017	Slovakia U17	9	(0)
- * Club domestic league appearances and goals as of 21 September 2026

Martin Trnovský (born 7 June 2000) is a Slovak professional footballer who last played for Slovak First Football League club Podbrezová as a goalkeeper.

== Club career ==
=== Slovan Bratislava ===
Trnovský made his Fortuna Liga debut for Slovan Bratislava against Zemplín Michalovce on 4 July 2020. He kept a clean sheet in the match.

== Career statistics ==
As of match played 16 May 2026

Appearances and goals by club, season and competition
Club	Season	League			Slovak Cup		Europe		Other		Total	
Club	Season	Division	Apps	Goals	Apps	Goals	Apps	Goals	Apps	Goals	Apps	Goals
Slovan Bratislava B	2019–20	2. Liga	8	0	—		—		—		8	0
Slovan Bratislava B	2020–21	2. Liga	1	0	—		—		—		1	0
Slovan Bratislava B	2021–22	2. Liga	12	0	—		—		—		12	0
Slovan Bratislava B	2022–23	2. Liga	4	0	—		—		—		4	0
Slovan Bratislava B	2023–24	2. Liga	6	0	—		—		—		6	0
Slovan Bratislava B	2024–25	2. Liga	6	0	—		—		—		6	0
Slovan Bratislava B	2025–26	2. Liga	8	0	—		—		—		8	0
Slovan Bratislava B	Total		45	0	—		—		—		45	0
Slovan Bratislava	2019–20	Slovak First Football League	1	0	0	0	0	0	—		1	0
Slovan Bratislava	2022–23	Slovak First Football League	14	0	2	0	1 (Note: Appearances in UEFA Conference League)	0	—		17	0
Slovan Bratislava	2023–24	Slovak First Football League	7	0	1	0	2	0	—		10	0
Slovan Bratislava	2024–25	Slovak First Football League	9	0	3	0	2 (Note: Appearances in UEFA Champions League)	0	—		14	0
Slovan Bratislava	2025–26	Slovak First Football League	6	0	2	0	1	0	—		9	0
Slovan Bratislava	Total		37	0	8	0	6	0	0	0	51	0
Career total			82	0	8	0	6	0	0	0	96	0

== Honours ==
Slovan Bratislava

- Niké Liga: 2019–20, 2022–23, 2023–24, 2024–25
