= Adam Hanes =

Slovak footballer

Personal information
- Full name: Adam Hanes
- Date of birth: 17 June 2002 (age 24)
- Place of birth: Zvolen, Slovakia
- Position: Attacking midfielder

Team information
- Current team: Dukla Banská Bystrica
- Number: 73

Youth career
- –2012: Detva
- 2012–2020: Dukla Banská Bystrica

Senior career*
Years	Team	Apps	(Gls)
2020–	Dukla Banská Bystrica	117	(10)
2022–2024	→ Dolný Kubín (loan)	20	(2)
2025	→ Zvolen (loan)	12	(5)
- * Club domestic league appearances and goals as of 21 September 2026

Adam Hanes (born 17 June 2002) is a Slovak footballer who plays for Dukla Banská Bystrica as an attacking-midfielder.

== Club career ==
Hanes made his Fortuna Liga debut for Dukla Banská Bystrica against FC Spartak Trnava on 24 July 2022.
