= Adrián Chovan =

Slovak footballer

Personal information
- Date of birth: 8 October 1995 (age 31)
- Place of birth: Partizánske, Slovakia
- Height: 1.92 m (6 ft 4 in)
- Position: Goalkeeper

Team information
- Current team: Bruk-Bet Termalica
- Number: 1

Youth career
- FK Junior Kanianka
- 2010–2014: AS Trenčín

Senior career*
Years	Team	Apps	(Gls)
2014–2020	AS Trenčín	14	(0)
2014	→ Nové Mesto nad Váhom (loan)	14	(0)
2018–2020	→ ViOn Zlaté Moravce (loan)	20	(0)
2020–2021	ViOn Zlaté Moravce	33	(0)
2021–2023	Slovan Bratislava	40	(0)
2023–2024	Panserraikos	28	(0)
2024–	Bruk-Bet Termalica	56	(0)

International career
2013	Slovakia U19	3	(0)
2015–2017	Slovakia U21	11	(0)
- * Club domestic league appearances and goals as of 21:51, 25 May 2026 (UTC)

Adrián Chovan (born 8 October 1995) is a Slovak professional footballer who plays as a goalkeeper for Polish club Bruk-Bet Termalica Nieciecza.

== Career ==
=== AS Trenčín ===
Chovan made his Fortuna Liga debut for AS Trenčín against Žilina on 13 May 2016.

=== Panserraikos ===
On 21 July 2023, Chovan moved overseas for the first time in his career, signing a two-year contract with Panserraikos.

=== Bruk-Bet Termalica ===
On 19 June 2024, Chovan was announced as the new signing of Polish second-tier club Bruk-Bet Termalica Nieciecza.

== Career statistics ==
As of match played 23 May 2026

Appearances and goals by club, season and competition
Club	Season	League			National cup (Note: Includes Slovak Cup, Polish Cup)		Continental		Other		Total	
Club	Season	Division	Apps	Goals	Apps	Goals	Apps	Goals	Apps	Goals	Apps	Goals
Nové Mesto nad Váhom (loan)	2014–15	2. Liga	14	0	0	0	—		—		14	0
Trenčín	2015–16	Slovak Super Liga	2	0	3	0	0	0	—		5	0
Trenčín	2016–17	Slovak Super Liga	6	0	4	0	3 (Note: Two appearances in UEFA Champions League, one appearance in UEFA Europa League)	0	—		13	0
Trenčín	2017–18	Slovak Super Liga	6	0	0	0	4 (Note: Appearances in UEFA Europa League)	0	—		10	0
Trenčín	Total		14	0	7	0	7	0	—		28	0
ViOn Zlaté Moravce (loan)	2018–19	Slovak Super Liga	18	0	3	0	—		—		21	0
ViOn Zlaté Moravce (loan)	2019–20	Slovak Super Liga	2	0	5	0	—		—		7	0
ViOn Zlaté Moravce (loan)	Total		20	0	8	0	—		—		28	0
ViOn Zlaté Moravce	2020–21	Slovak Super Liga	33	0	1	0	—		—		34	0
Slovan Bratislava	2021–22	Slovak Super Liga	21	0	7	0	13 (Note: Four appearances in UEFA Champions League, three appearances in UEFA Europa League, six appearances in UEFA Europa Conference League)	0	—		41	0
Slovan Bratislava	2022–23	Slovak Super Liga	19	0	4	0	16 (Note: Four appearances in UEFA Champions League, two appearances in UEFA Europa League, ten appearances in UEFA Europa Conference League)	0	—		39	0
Slovan Bratislava	Total		40	0	11	0	29	0	—		80	0
Panserraikos	2023–24	Super League Greece	28	0	0	0	—		—		28	0
Bruk-Bet Termalica	2024–25	I liga	34	0	1	0	—		—		35	0
Bruk-Bet Termalica	2025–26	Ekstraklasa	22	0	1	0	—		—		23	0
Bruk-Bet Termalica	Total		56	0	2	0	—		—		58	0
Career total			205	0	29	0	36	0	0	0	270	0

== Honours ==
Trenčín

- Slovak Super Liga: 2015–16
- Slovak Cup: 2015–16

Slovan Bratislava

- Slovak Super Liga: 2021–22, 2022–23
