= Jakub Uhrinčať =

Slovak footballer

Personal information
- Full name: Jakub Uhrinčať
- Date of birth: 7 February 2001 (age 25)
- Place of birth: Banská Bystrica, Slovakia
- Position: Centre-back

Team information
- Current team: Hradec Králové
- Number: 7

Youth career
- –2016: Dukla Banská Bystrica
- 2017–2020: Ružomberok
- 2020: → Dukla Banská Bystrica (loan)

Senior career*
Years	Team	Apps	(Gls)
2020–2024	Dukla Banská Bystrica	68	(2)
2022	→ Dolný Kubín	2	(1)
2024	→ Sparta Prague B (loan)	13	(0)
2024–2025	Sparta Prague B	25	(1)
2025–	Hradec Králové	24	(0)
- * Club domestic league appearances and goals as of 25 May 2026

Jakub Uhrinčať (born 7 February 2001) is a Slovak footballer who plays for Hradec Králové as a centre-back.

== Club career ==
Uhrinčať made his Fortuna Liga debut for Dukla Banská Bystrica against DAC Dunajská Streda on 14 August 2022. While featuring for Dukla, he also appeared on two occasions for farm team of Dolný Kubín.

On 17 January 2024, Uhrinčať joined Sparta Prague B on half-year loan deal with option.

On 11 July 2025, Uhrinčať signed a multi-year contract with Hradec Králové.
