= Tehelné pole =

Stadium in Bratislava, Slovakia

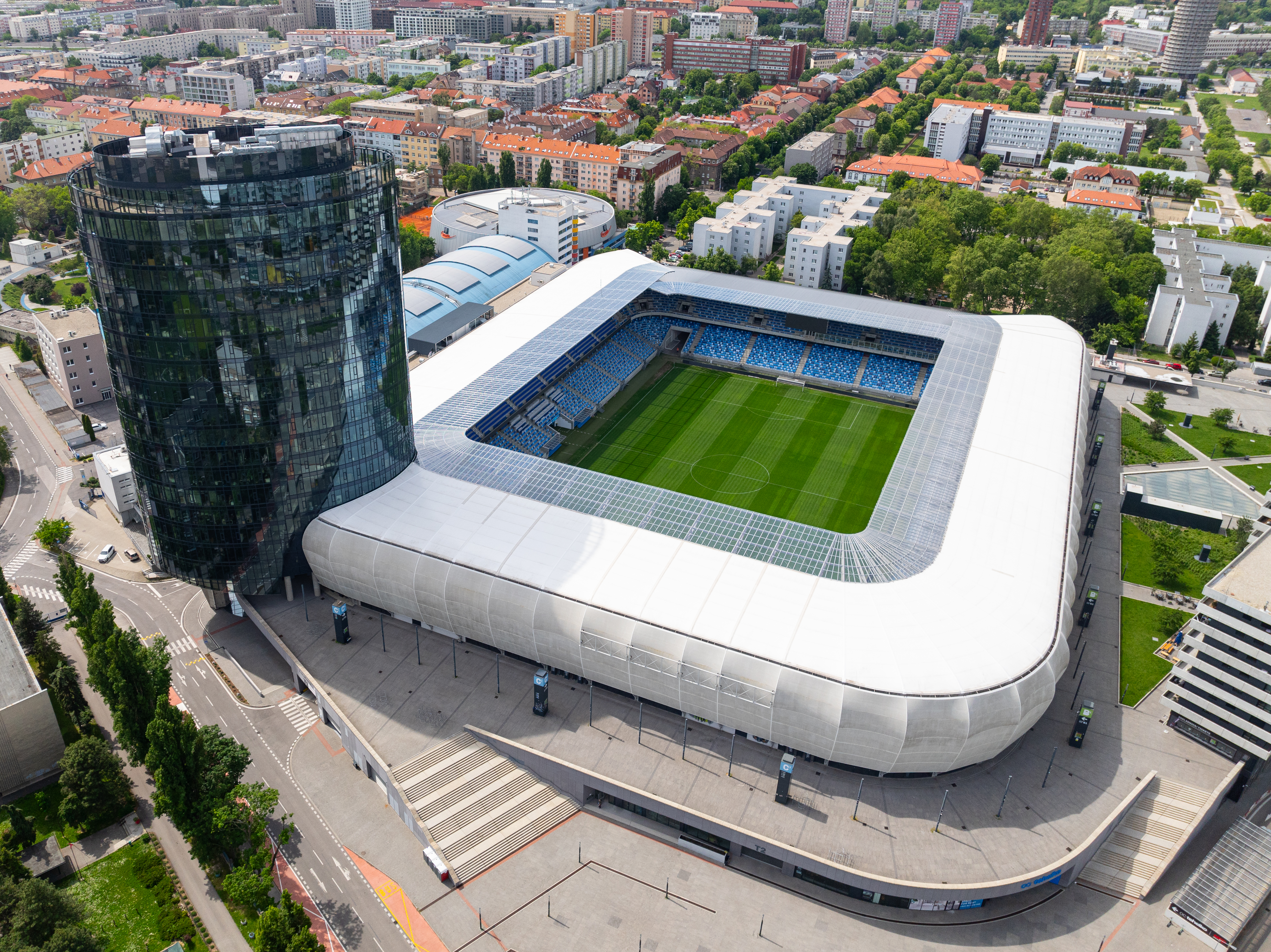
- UEFA
- Interactive map of Tehelné pole
- Full name: Tehelné pole
- Location: Viktora Tegelhoffa 4 Bratislava, Slovakia
- Coordinates: 48°9′48.81″N 17°8′12.68″E
- Capacity: 22,500
- Executive suites: 42
- Surface: Grass
- Field size: 105 x 68 m

Construction
- Groundbreaking: July 2013
- Opened: 2019
- Cost: € 98.5 million
- Architect: Karol Kállay
- General contractor: Strabag

Tenants
- ŠK Slovan Bratislava (2019–present); Slovakia national football team (2019–present); UEFA U-21 Championship (2025)

Website
- narodnyfutbalovystadion.sk

Tehelné pole or National football stadium (Slovak: Národný futbalový štadión) is a multi-use stadium in Bratislava, Slovakia. It was completed in 2019 and is used for football matches, including the home matches of ŠK Slovan Bratislava and the Slovakia national football team. This project concerns mutual assistance between well-known Slovak entrepreneur Ivan Kmotrík as the owner of ŠK Slovan Bratislava and the Government of Slovakia. The stadium has a capacity of 22,500 spectators, and replaced the old Tehelné pole stadium, which was demolished in summer 2013.

== Location ==
Tehelné pole (Brickfield) is a neighbourhood in Bratislava, Slovakia, characterised by the presence of several sports facilities. Administratively, the neighbourhood belongs to Nové Mesto borough, situated around 5 km north-east of the centre. The German and Hungarian names for this locality are Ziegelfeld and Téglamező.

== Transport ==
Tehelné Pole is located in the third district of Bratislava, Slovakia. The arena can be approached by tram, trolleybus and bus.

Service	Stop	Line	Walking distance
Tram	Česká, Nová doba	4	300–400 m
Bus	Česká, Nová doba	N53, X4	300–400 m
Trolleybus	Zimný štadión	47, 60, 61	600 m
Bus	Bajkalská, Nová doba	39, 53, 63, 75, 78, 98, 163, N74	200–250 m
Regional Bus	Bajkalská, Nová doba	506, 520, 540, 550, 565, 599, 610, 620, 622, 630, 632	200–250 m

Drivers can park directly under the National Football Stadium. There is space for 994 cars. An additional 365 parking spaces are offered at the Ondrej Nepela Arena, which is approximately 300 m away from the stadium or Polus City Center, which offers 1,683 parking spaces. This shopping center is located on Vajnorská 100 street, which is 350 m away.

== Milestone matches ==
The first match was played at the stadium in January 2019. Only holders of season tickets had access to the friendly game between Slovan and Czech First League side Sigma Olomouc, which finished 3–2 to the visitors. The first competitive match took place on 3 March 2019. In the 21st round of the Slovak League, Slovan defeated their main rivals Trnava in front of sold-out stands. On 11 May 2019, Slovan, who had already clinched the title, defeated Žilina 6–2 in a special match, which was dedicated to the 100th anniversary of the club's establishment. Slovan had celebrated this anniversary on 3 May. On 24 May 2019, Slovan defeated Sereď 3–1 in the last league round. After the match, the first championship celebrations took place at the stadium.

As league champion, Slovan qualified for the 2019–20 UEFA Champions League. The first European match at the stadium took place on 10 July 2019. In it, Slovan drew with Sutjeska Nikšić, the champion of Montenegro. Two weeks later, the first Europa League game was played at the stadium. In the second qualifying round, Slovan played against Feronikeli from Kosovo. Slovan then advanced to the group stage of the competition and played against Besiktas, Wolverhampton and Braga.

On 13 October 2019, the first international match took place at Tehelné pole. Slovakia drew with Paraguay in a friendly.

On 4 December 2019, Slovan played their first match in the Slovak Cup at the stadium, defeating Žilina 2–0. On 8 July 2020, the stadium hosted the 2020 Slovak Cup Final. Slovan defeated Ružomberok 1–0 and celebrated victory at their home stadium.

On 16 September 2021, the first Conference League match was played at Tehelné pole. Slovan lost to Copenhagen in the group stage of the newly created competition.

16 January 2019 First match (Note: Only a trial match.)	Slovan Bratislava (Slovakia)	2–3	(Czech Republic) Sigma Olomouc	Friendly match
17:00 CET (UTC+01:00)	Moha 26'; Medveděv 72'	Report	Jemelka 53'; Yunis 60'; Zahradníček 88'	Attendance: 2,183 (Note: Limited capacity; access allowed to season ticket holders only.)

3 March 2019 First Slovak League match (Note: The official opening match.)	Slovan Bratislava (Slovakia)	2–0	(Slovakia) Spartak Trnava	Traditional derby
18:00 CET (UTC+01:00)	Šporar 50', 86'	Report		Attendance: 22,500

10 July 2019 First Champions League match	Slovan Bratislava (Slovakia)	1–1	(Montenegro) Sutjeska Nikšić	1st qualifying round
20:15 CEST (UTC+02:00)	Šporar 82'	Report	Kojašević 90+5'	Attendance: 11,250

24 July 2019 First Europa League match	Slovan Bratislava (Slovakia)	2–1	(Kosovo) Feronikeli	2nd qualifying round
18:00 CEST (UTC+02:00)	Nono 9'; Šporar 61' (pen.)	Report	Hoti 67'	Attendance: 7,150

13 October 2019 First international match	Slovakia	1–1	Paraguay	Friendly match
20:45 CEST (UTC+02:00)	Boženík 59'	Report	Kaku 85'	Attendance: 6,669

4 December 2019 First Slovak Cup match	Slovan Bratislava (Slovakia)	2–0	(Slovakia) Žilina	Round of 16
18:30 CET (UTC+01:00)	Kaša 25' (o.g.); Šporar (penalty missed) 29', 41'	Report		Attendance: 3,879

16 September 2021 First Conference League match	Slovan Bratislava (Slovakia)	1–3	(Denmark) Copenhagen	Group stage
18:45 CEST (UTC+02:00)	Henty 21'	Report	Wind 18', 68' (pen.); Stage 41'	Attendance: 9,833

== International matches ==
13 October 2019 International friendly	Slovakia	1–1	Paraguay
20:45	Boženík 59'	Report	Kaku 85'	Attendance: 6,669; Referee: Slavko Vinčić (Slovenia)

4 September 2020 2020–21 UEFA Nations League B	Slovakia	1–3	Czech Republic
20:45	Schranz 88'	Report	Coufal 48'; Dočkal 53' (pen.); Krmenčík 86'	Attendance: 0 Referee: Andris Treimanis (Latvia)

8 October 2020 UEFA Euro 2020 qualifying play-offs	Slovakia	0–0 (a.e.t.) (4–2 p)	Republic of Ireland
20:45		Report		Attendance: 0 Referee: Clément Turpin (France)
	Penalties
	Hamšík (penalty scored); Hrošovský (penalty scored); Haraslín (penalty scored); Greguš (penalty scored)		(penalty scored) Hourihane; (penalty scored) Brady; (penalty missed) Browne; (penalty missed) Doherty

4 September 2021 2022 FIFA World Cup qualification	Slovakia	0–1	Croatia
20:45		Report	Brozović 86'	Attendance: 9,047; Referee: Bartosz Frankowski (Poland)

7 September 2021 2022 FIFA World Cup qualification	Slovakia	2–0	Cyprus
20:45	Schranz 55'; Koscelník 77'	Report		Attendance: 6,762; Referee: Aliyar Aghayev (Azerbaijan)

27 September 2022 International friendly	Canada	0–2	Uruguay
18:00 UTC+2		Report	De la Cruz 6'; Núñez 34'	Referee: Peter Kráľovič (Slovakia)

20 November 2022 International friendly	Slovakia	0–0	Chile
13:30		Report		Attendance: 19,757; Referee: Ondřej Berka (Czech Republic)

26 March 2023 UEFA Euro 2024 qualification	Slovakia	2–0	Bosnia and Herzegovina
20:45	Mak 13'; Haraslín 40'	Report		Attendance: 6,052; Referee: Marco Di Bello (Italy)

8 September 2023 UEFA Euro 2024 qualification	Slovakia	0–1	Portugal
20:45		Report	Fernandes 43'	Attendance: 21,473; Referee: Glenn Nyberg (Sweden)

11 September 2023 UEFA Euro 2024 qualification	Slovakia	3–0	Liechtenstein
20:45	Hancko 1'; Duda 3'; Mak 6'	Report		Attendance: 13,679; Referee: Sander van der Eijk (Netherlands)

16 November 2023 UEFA Euro 2024 qualification	Slovakia	4–2	Iceland
20:45	Kucka 30'; Duda 36' (pen.); Haraslín 47', 55'	Report	Óskarsson 17'; Guðjohnsen 74'	Attendance: 21,548; Referee: Craig Pawson (England)

4 September 2025 2026 FIFA World Cup qualification	Slovakia	2–0	Germany
20:45	Hancko 42'; Strelec 55'	Report		Attendance: 20,013; Referee: Serdar Gözübüyük (Netherlands)

26 March 2026 2026 FIFA World Cup qualification	Slovakia	3–4	Kosovo
20:45	Valjent 6'; Haraslín 45'; Strelec 90+4'	Report	Hodža 21'; Asllani 47'; Muslija 60'; Hajrizi 72'	Attendance: 20,113; Referee: Espen Eskås (Norway)

31 March 2026 International friendly	Slovakia	2–0	Romania
20:45	Strelec 46'; Bîrligea 7' (o.g.)			Attendance: 8,043; Referee: Ondrej Berka (Czechia)

== Image gallery ==
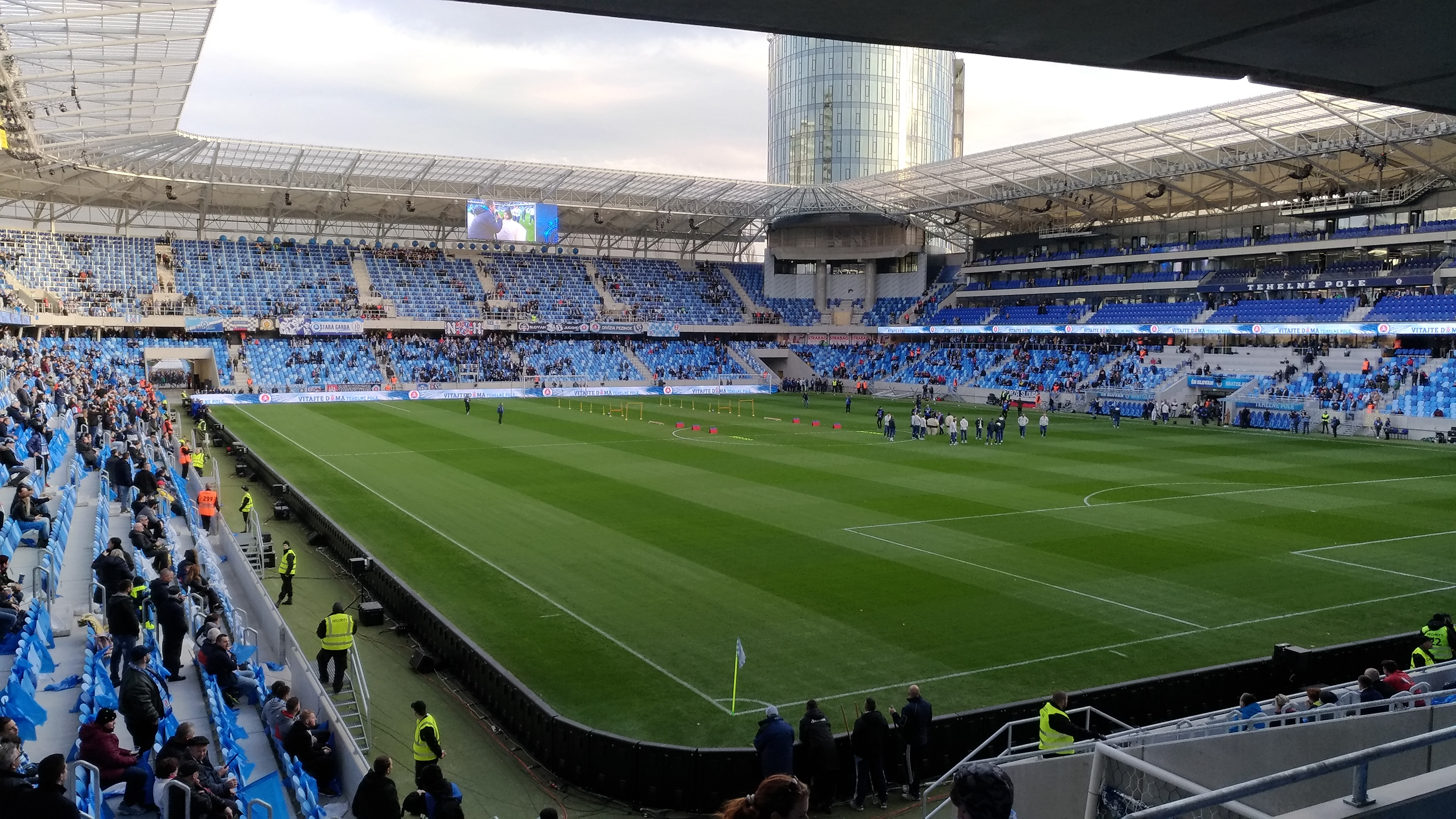
Tehelné Pole stadium in 2019

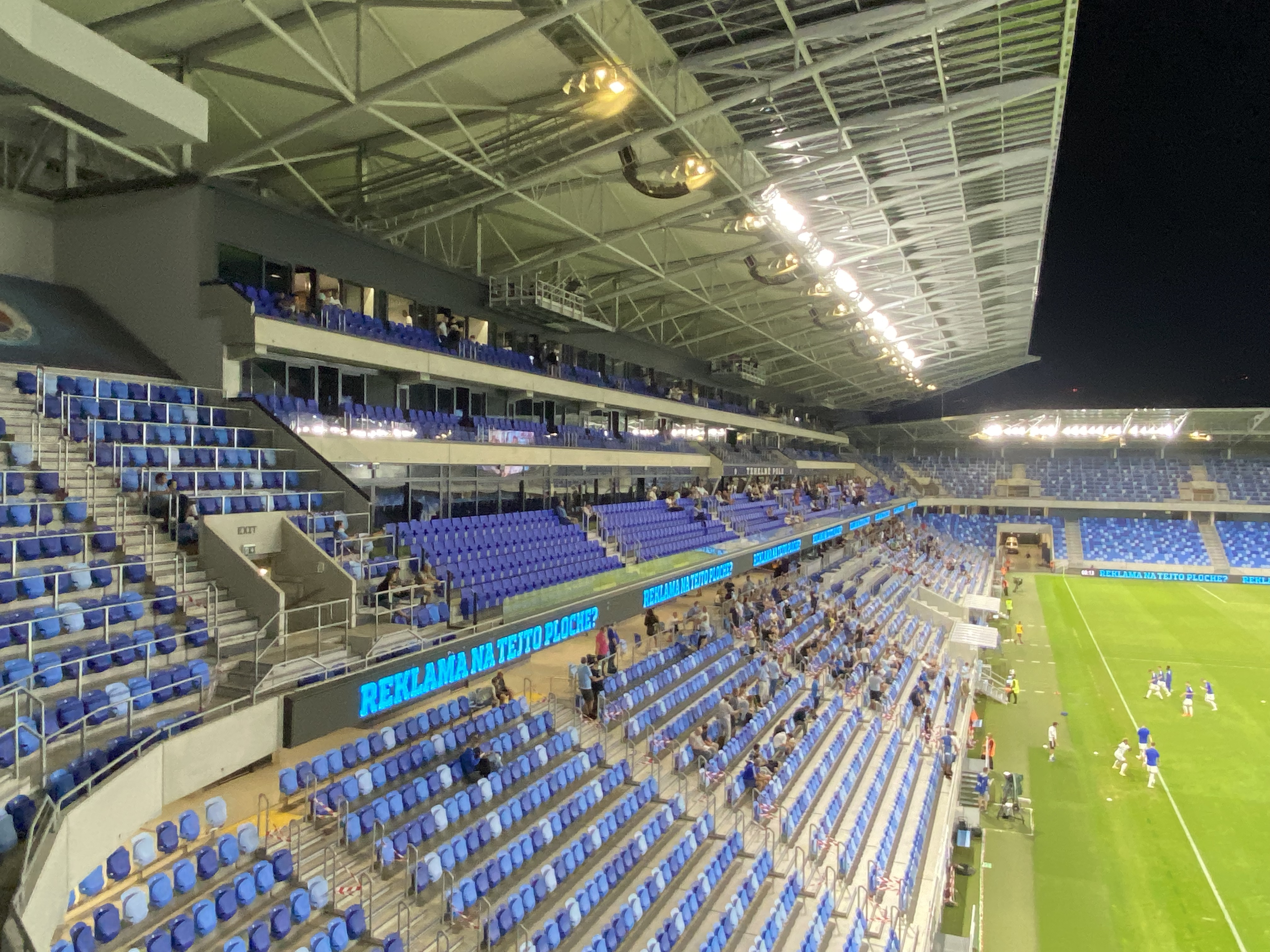
Tehelné Pole stadium in 2021

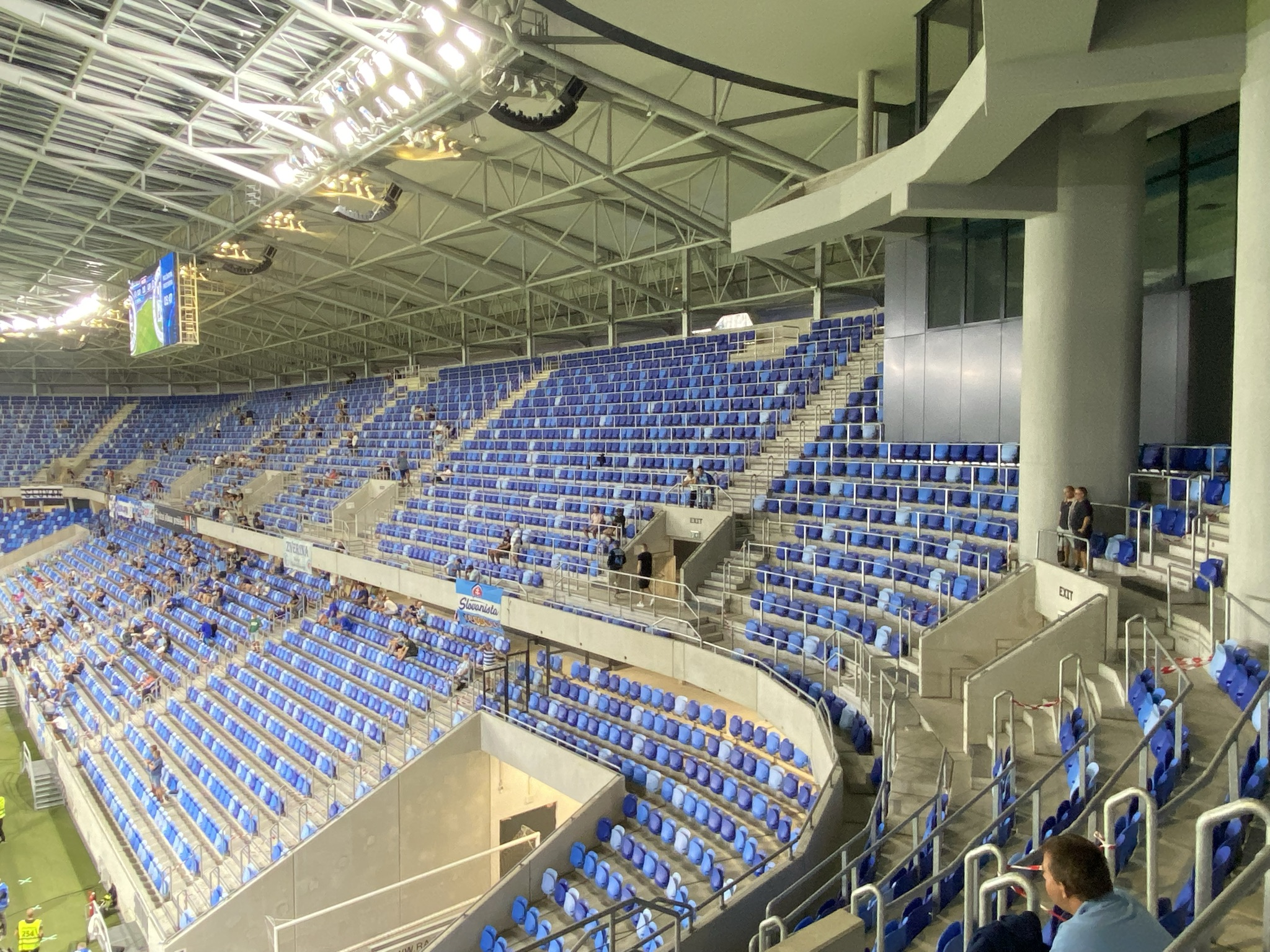
A stand at the Tehelné Pole Stadium (2021)

== Concert venue ==
The stadium also serves as a concert venue. Slovak band Elán was the first band to perform at the National Football Stadium. The list of concerts can be seen below:

Date	Artist or Event Title	Attendance
29 May 2019	Elán	20,000
5 June 2019	Kabát	26,000
10 June 2022	IMT Smile, Lucie... (Lovestream Festival)	10,000
11 June 2022	Dua Lipa, Lost Frequencies... (Lovestream Festival)	20,000
12 June 2022	Red Hot Chili Peppers, Calum Scott... (Lovestream Festival)	28,600
28 May 2023	Depeche Mode	30,000
10 October 2025	Separ	30,000
30 May 2026	Iron Maiden	30,000
26 September 2026	Enrigue Inglesias	27,500

== Other stadiums/venues nearby ==
Other stadiums or venues near Tehelné pole locality include Štadión Pasienky (built 1962), home ground of FK Inter Bratislava, ice hockey Ondrej Nepela Arena (rebuilt from 2009 to 2011), home of the team HC Slovan Bratislava and the National Tennis Centre (built 2003), which is used for Fed Cup as well as Davis Cup matches, concerts and other events.
