= Byšta =

Village and municipality in Slovakia

Byšta Biste
- Municipality
- Flag Coat of arms

- Location of Byšta in the Košice Region Location of Byšta in Slovakia
- Coordinates: 48.53°N 21.55°E
- Country: Slovakia
- Region: Košice Region
- District: Trebišov District
- First mentioned: 1270

Area
  - Total: 11.52 km^{2} (4.45 sq mi)
- Elevation: 279 m (915 ft)

Population (2025)
  - Total: 135
- Time zone: UTC+1 (CET)
  - Summer (DST): UTC+2 (CEST)
- Postal code: 761 3
- Area code: +421 56
- Vehicle registration plate (until 2022): TV
- Website: bysta.sk

Byšta (Hungarian: Biste) is a village and municipality in the Trebišov District in the Košice Region of eastern Slovakia.

== History ==
In historical records the village was first mentioned in 1270.

== Geography ==
The municipality lies at an altitude of 279 metres (915 ft) and covers an area of 11.52 km^{2} (4.45 sq mi) (2025).

== Population ==
Population statistic (10 years)
Year	1995	2005	2015	2025
Count	184	156	147	135
Difference		−15.21%	−5.76%	−8.16%

Population statistic
Year	2024	2025
Count	138	135
Difference		−2.17%

It has a population of 135 people (31 December 2025).

=== Ethnicity ===
Census 2021 (1+ %)
Ethnicity	Number	Fraction
Slovak	146	98.64%
Not found out	2	1.35%
Total	148	

In year 2021 was 148 people by ethnicity 146 as Slovak, 2 as Not found out and 1 as Other.

Note on population: The difference values of population numbers in the table "Population statistic" and in the sections "Ethnicity" & "Religion" is caused by the use of various statistical methods.

=== Religion ===
Census 2021 (1+ %)
Religion	Number	Fraction
Eastern Orthodox Church	40	27.03%
Greek Catholic Church	36	24.32%
Roman Catholic Church	27	18.24%
Calvinist Church	17	11.49%
None	12	8.11%
Other and not ascertained christian church	6	4.05%
Jehovah's Witnesses	4	2.7%
Not found out	3	2.03%
Total	148	

In year 2021 was 148 people by religion 40 from Eastern Orthodox Church, 36 from Greek Catholic Church, 27 from Roman Catholic Church, 17 from Calvinist Church, 12 from None, 6 from Other and not ascertained christian church, 4 from Jehovah's Witnesses, 3 from Not found out, 1 from Christian Congregations in Slovakia, 1 from Evangelical Church and 1 from Church of the Brethren.

== Facilities ==
The village has a public library, a swimming pool and a football pitch.

== Genealogical resources ==
The records for genealogical research are available at the state archive "Statny Archiv in Kosice, Slovakia"

- Roman Catholic church records (births/marriages/deaths): 1774–1900 (parish B)
- Greek Catholic church records (births/marriages/deaths): 1826–1897 (parish B)

== See also ==
- List of municipalities and towns in Slovakia
