= Stankovce =

Stankovce Sztankóc
- Municipality
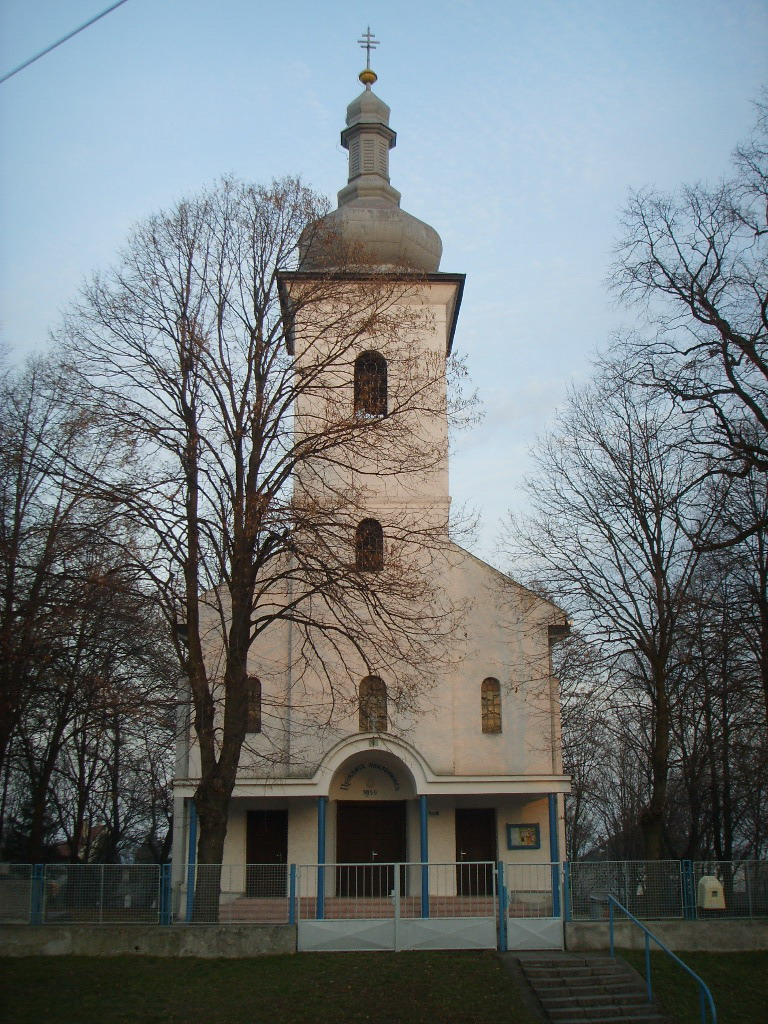

- Flag

- Location of Stankovce in the Košice Region Location of Stankovce in Slovakia
- Coordinates: 48.77°N 21.66°E
- Country: Slovakia
- Region: Košice Region
- District: Trebišov District
- First mentioned: 1335

Area
  - Total: 4.40 km^{2} (1.70 sq mi)
- Elevation: 138 m (453 ft)

Population (2025)
  - Total: 136
- Time zone: UTC+1 (CET)
  - Summer (DST): UTC+2 (CEST)
- Postal code: 766 1
- Area code: +421 56
- Vehicle registration plate (until 2022): TV

Stankovce (Hungarian: Sztankóc) is a village and municipality in the Trebišov District in the Košice Region of eastern Slovakia.

== Geography ==
The municipality lies at an altitude of 138 metres (453 ft) and covers an area of 4.40 km^{2} (1.70 sq mi) (2025).

== Population ==
Population statistic (10 years)
Year	1995	2005	2015	2025
Count	168	189	165	136
Difference		+12.5%	−12.69%	−17.57%

Population statistic
Year	2024	2025
Count	136	136
Difference		−1.42%

It has a population of 136 people (31 December 2025).

=== Ethnicity ===
Census 2021 (1+ %)
Ethnicity	Number	Fraction
Slovak	146	97.33%
Czech	4	2.66%
Not found out	3	2%
Rusyn	2	1.33%
Total	150	

In year 2021 was 150 people by ethnicity 146 as Slovak, 4 as Czech, 3 as Not found out and 2 as Rusyn.

Note on population: The difference values of population numbers in the table "Population statistic" and in the sections "Ethnicity" & "Religion" is caused by the use of various statistical methods.

=== Religion ===
Census 2021 (1+ %)
Religion	Number	Fraction
Roman Catholic Church	73	48.67%
Greek Catholic Church	40	26.67%
Not found out	11	7.33%
None	11	7.33%
Eastern Orthodox Church	7	4.67%
Evangelical Church	5	3.33%
Calvinist Church	2	1.33%
Total	150	

In year 2021 was 150 people by religion 73 from Roman Catholic Church, 40 from Greek Catholic Church, 11 from Not found out, 11 from None, 7 from Eastern Orthodox Church, 5 from Evangelical Church, 2 from Calvinist Church and 1 from Bahá'i Community.
