= Kravany, Trebišov District =

Kravany Kereplye
- Municipality
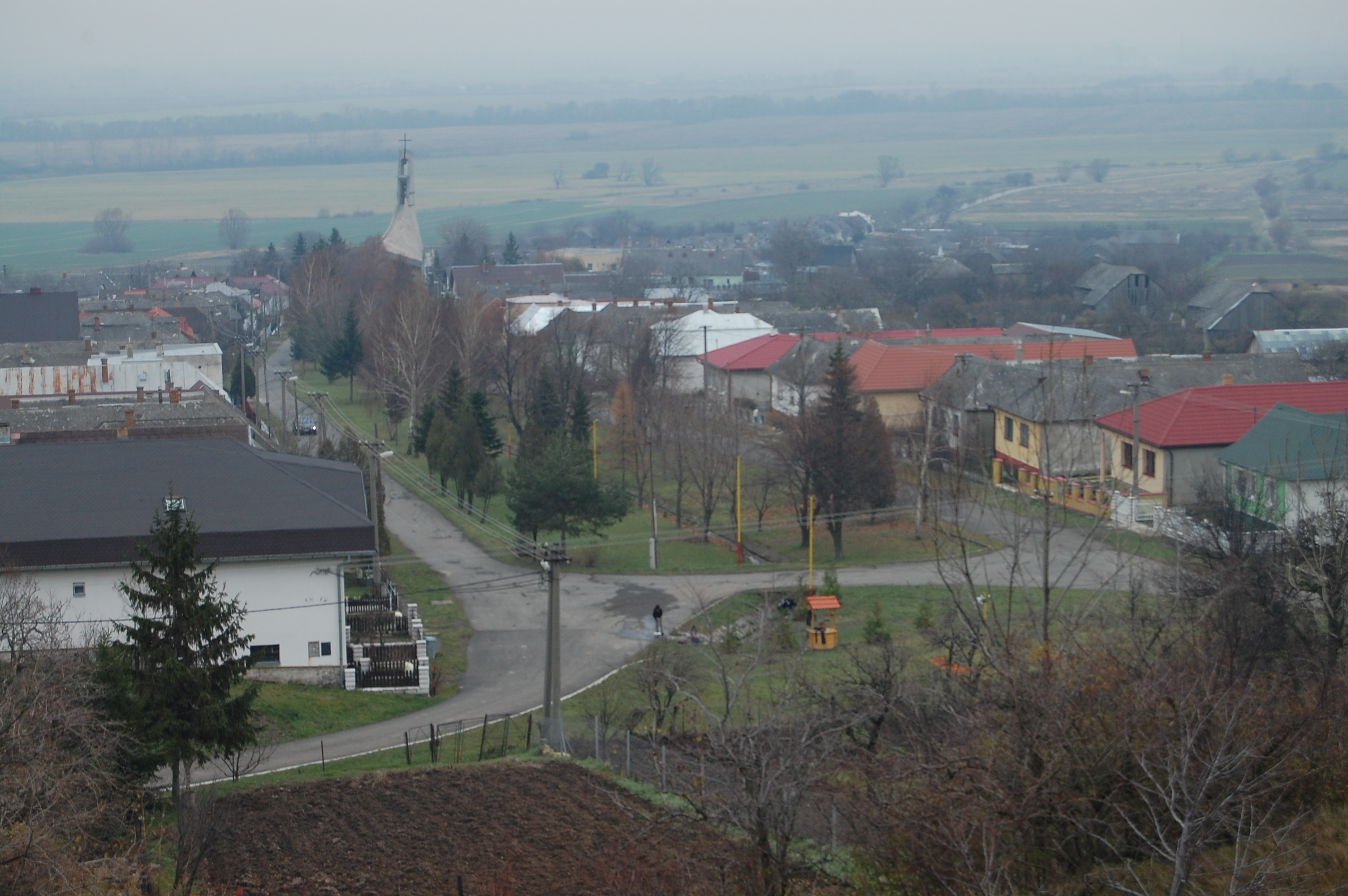

- Flag

- Location of Kravany in the Košice Region Location of Kravany in Slovakia
- Coordinates: 48.76°N 21.64°E
- Country: Slovakia
- Region: Košice Region
- District: Trebišov District
- First mentioned: 1339

Area
  - Total: 6.33 km^{2} (2.44 sq mi)
- Elevation: 169 m (554 ft)

Population (2025)
  - Total: 375
- Time zone: UTC+1 (CET)
  - Summer (DST): UTC+2 (CEST)
- Postal code: 766 1
- Area code: +421 56
- Vehicle registration plate (until 2022): TV
- Website: www.kravany.eu

Kravany (Hungarian: Kereplye) is a village and municipality in the Trebišov District in the Košice Region of eastern Slovakia.

== Population ==
Population statistic (10 years)
Year	1995	2005	2015	2025
Count	340	336	351	375
Difference		−1.17%	+4.46%	+6.83%

Population statistic
Year	2024	2025
Count	362	375
Difference		+3.59%

It has a population of 375 people (31 December 2025).

=== Ethnicity ===
Census 2021 (1+ %)
Ethnicity	Number	Fraction
Slovak	352	96.17%
Romani	130	35.51%
Not found out	15	4.09%
Total	366	

In year 2021 was 366 people by ethnicity 352 as Slovak, 130 as Romani, 15 as Not found out, 2 as Rusyn, 1 as Czech and 1 as Moravian.

Note on population: The difference values of population numbers in the table "Population statistic" and in the sections "Ethnicity" & "Religion" is caused by the use of various statistical methods.

=== Religion ===
Census 2021 (1+ %)
Religion	Number	Fraction
Roman Catholic Church	154	42.08%
Greek Catholic Church	127	34.7%
Eastern Orthodox Church	38	10.38%
None	28	7.65%
Not found out	11	3.01%
United Methodist Church	4	1.09%
Evangelical Church	4	1.09%
Total	366	

In year 2021 was 366 people by religion 154 from Roman Catholic Church, 127 from Greek Catholic Church, 38 from Eastern Orthodox Church, 28 from None, 11 from Not found out, 4 from United Methodist Church and 4 from Evangelical Church.
