= Soľnička =

Municipality of Slovakia

Soľnička Szolnocska
- Municipality
- Flag

- Location of Soľnička in the Košice Region Location of Soľnička in Slovakia
- Coordinates: 48.48°N 21.96°E
- Country: Slovakia
- Region: Košice Region
- District: Trebišov District
- First mentioned: 1332

Area
  - Total: 6.15 km^{2} (2.37 sq mi)
- Elevation: 105 m (344 ft)

Population (2025)
  - Total: 247
- Time zone: UTC+1 (CET)
  - Summer (DST): UTC+2 (CEST)
- Postal code: 765 3
- Area code: +421 56
- Vehicle registration plate (until 2022): TV

Soľnička (Hungarian: Szolnocska) is a village and municipality in the Trebišov District in the Košice Region of south-eastern Slovakia.

== Etymology ==
The name comes from Slavic Soľnik. "Soľ" (salt) + derivational suffix "-nik" meaning "salt store". 1359 Zolnuk, 1786 Solnocchska (Soľnička).

== History ==
In historical records, the village was first mentioned in 1332. In the late 17th century, the plague devastated the village and three Csoma brothers - Janos, Gyorgy and Istvan were sent from the neighboring village of Lelesz, now Leles, Slovakia to repopulate the town. The Csoma, Pataki, Buti and Szajko families were the main original families in the village.

During its history, it was part of Ung Varmegye, and then Zemplen. After the World War I, and the Treaty of Trianon, the partitioning of Hungary, the village become a part of newly formed Czechoslovakia. The village and most of the region were again a part of Hungary from 1938 to 1945 when it again reverted to Slovak control. In 1945, Czech and Slovak troops surrounded the village and demanded that all ethnic Hungarians leave. They were to be deported with 50 kilos of personal belongings each. However the local judge had to sign the order and seeing that the judge was a Csoma, he refused to sign it, and after three days the troops left. There were major deportations from surrounding villages however the village is still over 95% Hungarian.

== Geography ==
The municipality lies at an altitude of 105 metres (344 ft) and covers an area of 6.15 km^{2} (2.37 sq mi) (2025).

== Population ==
Population statistic (10 years)
Year	1995	2005	2015	2025
Count	241	248	229	247
Difference		+2.90%	−7.66%	+7.86%

Population statistic
Year	2024	2025
Count	247	247
Difference		−1.42%

It has a population of 247 people (31 December 2025).

=== Ethnicity ===
Census 2021 (1+ %)
Ethnicity	Number	Fraction
Hungarian	185	82.22%
Slovak	45	20%
Romani	6	2.66%
Not found out	6	2.66%
Total	225	

In year 2021 was 225 people by ethnicity 185 as Hungarian, 45 as Slovak, 6 as Romani and 6 as Not found out.

Note on population: The difference values of population numbers in the table "Population statistic" and in the sections "Ethnicity" & "Religion" is caused by the use of various statistical methods.

=== Religion ===
Census 2021 (1+ %)
Religion	Number	Fraction
Roman Catholic Church	124	55.11%
Calvinist Church	40	17.78%
Greek Catholic Church	23	10.22%
None	16	7.11%
Jehovah's Witnesses	9	4%
Not found out	6	2.67%
Other and not ascertained christian church	5	2.22%
Total	225	

In year 2021 was 225 people by religion 124 from Roman Catholic Church, 40 from Calvinist Church, 23 from Greek Catholic Church, 16 from None, 9 from Jehovah's Witnesses, 6 from Not found out, 5 from Other and not ascertained christian church and 2 from Evangelical Church.

== Facilities ==
The village has a public library.
