= Somotor =

Somotor Szomotor
- Municipality
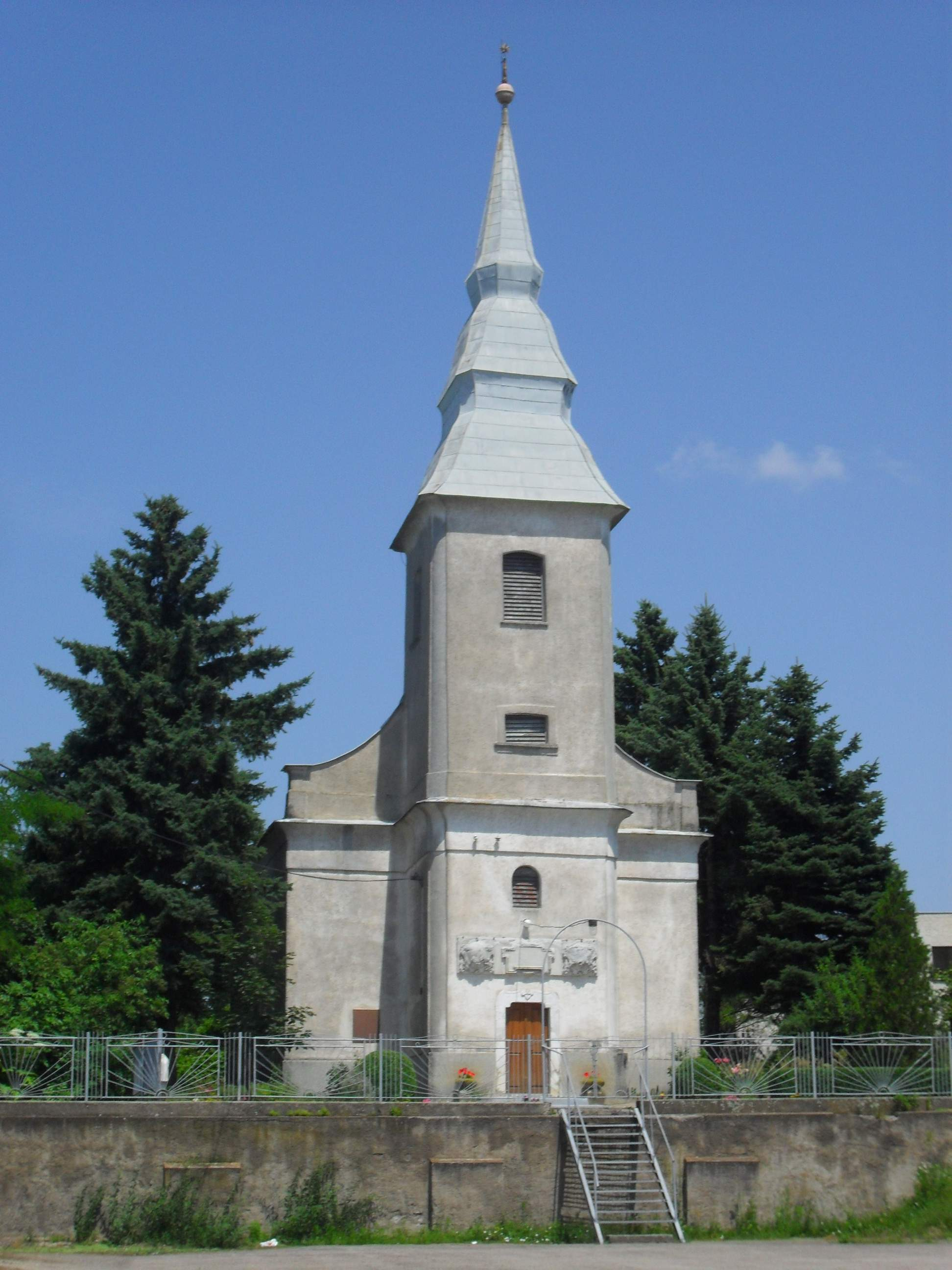
- Protestant church in the village

- Flag

- Location of Somotor in the Košice Region Location of Somotor in Slovakia
- Coordinates: 48.40°N 21.81°E
- Country: Slovakia
- Region: Košice Region
- District: Trebišov District
- First mentioned: 1214

Government
  - Mayor: Ján Juhász

Area
  - Total: 16.30 km^{2} (6.29 sq mi)
- Elevation: 98 m (322 ft)

Population (2025)
  - Total: 1,377
- Time zone: UTC+1 (CET)
  - Summer (DST): UTC+2 (CEST)
- Postal code: 763 5
- Area code: +421 56
- Vehicle registration plate (until 2022): TV
- Website: obecsomotor.tym.sk

Somotor (Hungarian: Szomotor) is a village and municipality in the Trebišov District in the Košice Region of south-eastern Slovakia.

== Geography ==
The municipality lies at an altitude of 98 metres (322 ft) and covers an area of 16.30 km^{2} (6.29 sq mi) (2025).

== History ==
In historical records the village was first mentioned in 1214. The town was given a charter as a town in 1263 in a document mentioning "terrum Zomothor." The current Hungarian name of Szomotor was adopted in the late 1800s and even after the partitioning of Hungary, leaving Szomotor now in the new country of Czechoslovakia. The name remained Szomotor until 1927 when the Czech government changed it to Somotor to conform with Czech and Slovak spelling. [Historical records state that] Slavic linguists say that the name of the town comes from the word "cmotr" (to look) however when the town was founded there was no evidence of Slavic inhabitants. Hungarian linguists say it comes from Szomoru Tor, which means sad funeral (wake) which took place after the death of Chief Ond (after the arrival of the Magyars in the 980s.) The area was inhabited by the Magyars after their arrival.

A Jewish community did exist in this town prior to World War II, which was destroyed in 1944 by Nazi Germany. A Jewish cemetery exists in this town (the name of the town is spelled in Hebrew: סאמאטאר

== Population ==
Population statistic (10 years)
Year	1995	2005	2015	2025
Count	1648	1665	1492	1377
Difference		+1.03%	−10.39%	−7.70%

Population statistic
Year	2024	2025
Count	1372	1377
Difference		+0.36%

It has a population of 1377 people (31 December 2025).

=== Ethnicity ===
Census 2021 (1+ %)
Ethnicity	Number	Fraction
Hungarian	960	69.11%
Slovak	512	36.86%
Not found out	55	3.95%
Total	1389	

In year 2021 was 1389 people by ethnicity 960 as Hungarian, 512 as Slovak, 55 as Not found out, 10 as Romani, 6 as Other, 3 as Rusyn, 1 as Russian, 1 as Polish, 1 as German and 1 as English.

Note on population: The difference values of population numbers in the table "Population statistic" and in the sections "Ethnicity" & "Religion" is caused by the use of various statistical methods.

=== Religion ===
Census 2021 (1+ %)
Religion	Number	Fraction
Roman Catholic Church	463	33.33%
Calvinist Church	366	26.35%
Greek Catholic Church	230	16.56%
None	186	13.39%
Not found out	79	5.69%
Jehovah's Witnesses	31	2.23%
Evangelical Church	21	1.51%
Total	1389	

In year 2021 was 1389 people by religion 463 from Roman Catholic Church, 366 from Calvinist Church, 230 from Greek Catholic Church, 186 from None, 79 from Not found out, 31 from Jehovah's Witnesses, 21 from Evangelical Church, 5 from Other and not ascertained christian church, 5 from Other, 1 from Christian Congregations in Slovakia, 1 from Islam and 1 from Ad hoc movements.

== Facilities ==
The village has a public library, a gym and a football pitch.
