= Malé Ozorovce =

Village and municipality in Slovakia

Malé Ozorovce Kisazar
- Municipality
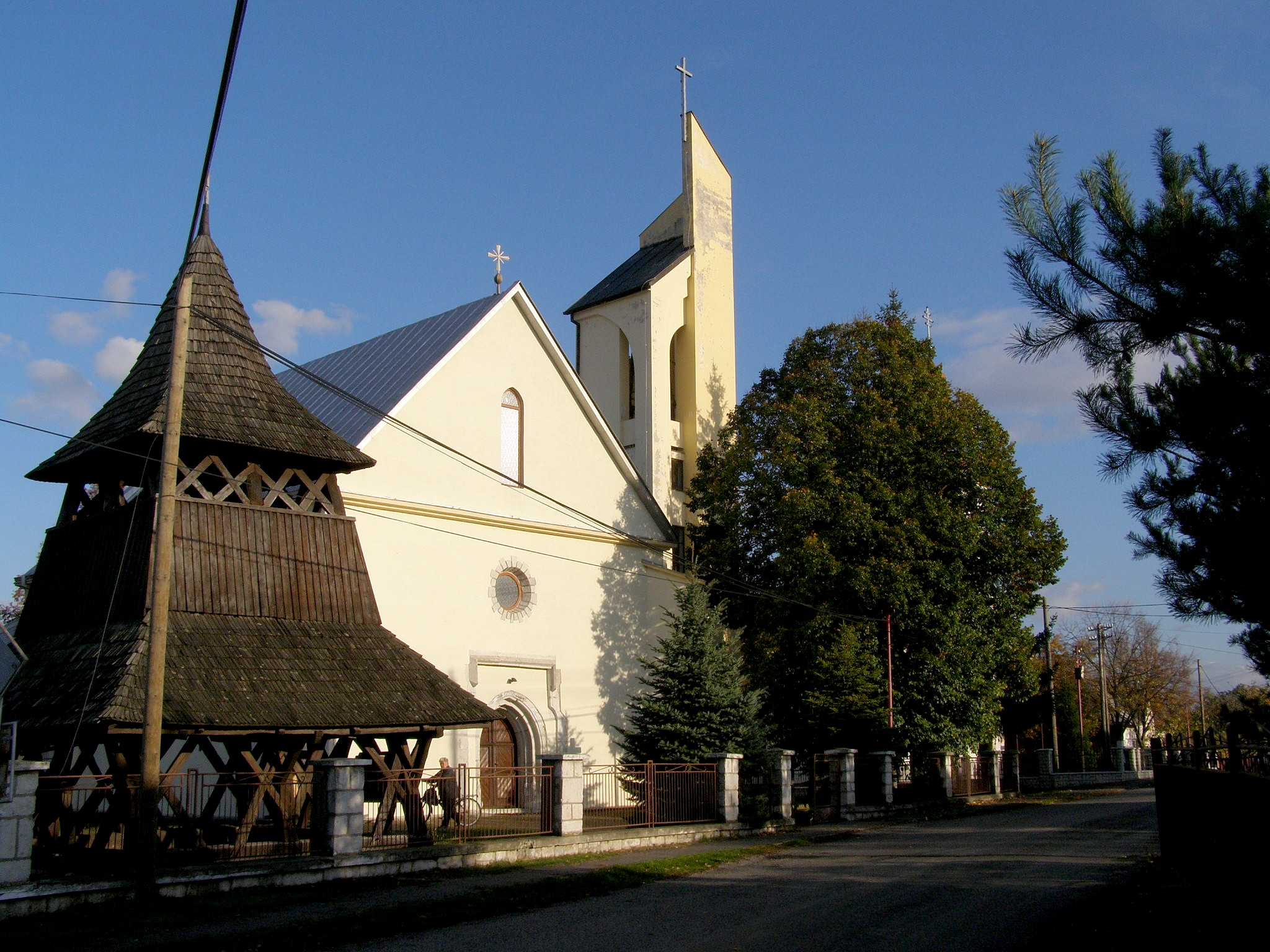

- Flag

- Location of Malé Ozorovce in the Košice Region Location of Malé Ozorovce in Slovakia
- Coordinates: 48.68°N 21.62°E
- Country: Slovakia
- Region: Košice Region
- District: Trebišov District
- First mentioned: 1332

Area
  - Total: 17.08 km^{2} (6.59 sq mi)
- Elevation: 196 m (643 ft)

Population (2025)
  - Total: 530
- Time zone: UTC+1 (CET)
  - Summer (DST): UTC+2 (CEST)
- Postal code: 766 3
- Area code: +421 56
- Vehicle registration plate (until 2022): TV
- Website: www.obecmaleozorovce.sk

Malé Ozorovce (Hungarian: Kisazar) is a village and municipality in the Trebišov District in the Košice Region of south-eastern Slovakia.

== History ==
In historical records the village was first mentioned in 1332.

== Geography ==
The municipality lies at an altitude of 196 metres (643 ft) and covers an area of 17.08 km^{2} (6.59 sq mi) (2025).

== Population ==
Population statistic (10 years)
| Year | 1995 | 2005 | 2015 | 2025 |
|---|---|---|---|---|
| Count | 555 | 556 | 533 | 530 |
| Difference | | +0.18% | −4.13% | −0.56% |

Population statistic
| Year | 2024 | 2025 |
|---|---|---|
| Count | 519 | 530 |
| Difference | | +2.11% |

It has a population of 530 people (31 December 2025).

=== Ethnicity ===
Census 2021 (1+ %)
| Ethnicity | Number | Fraction |
|---|---|---|
| Slovak | 517 | 98.47% |
| Total | 525 | |

In year 2021 was 525 people by ethnicity 517 as Slovak, 5 as Ukrainian, 4 as Other, 2 as Czech, 2 as Not found out, 2 as Hungarian, 1 as Italian, 1 as Rusyn and 1 as German.

Note on population: The difference values of population numbers in the table "Population statistic" and in the sections "Ethnicity" & "Religion" is caused by the use of various statistical methods.

=== Religion ===
Census 2021 (1+ %)
| Religion | Number | Fraction |
|---|---|---|
| Roman Catholic Church | 297 | 56.57% |
| Greek Catholic Church | 160 | 30.48% |
| None | 47 | 8.95% |
| Not found out | 6 | 1.14% |
| Total | 525 | |

In year 2021 was 525 people by religion 297 from Roman Catholic Church, 160 from Greek Catholic Church, 47 from None, 6 from Not found out, 5 from Calvinist Church, 4 from Baptists Church, 3 from Islam, 1 from Evangelical Church, 1 from Buddhism and 1 from Ad hoc movements.

== Facilities ==
The village has a public library and a football pitch.
