= Veľký Horeš =

Village and municipality in Slovakia

Veľký Horeš Nagygéres
- Municipality
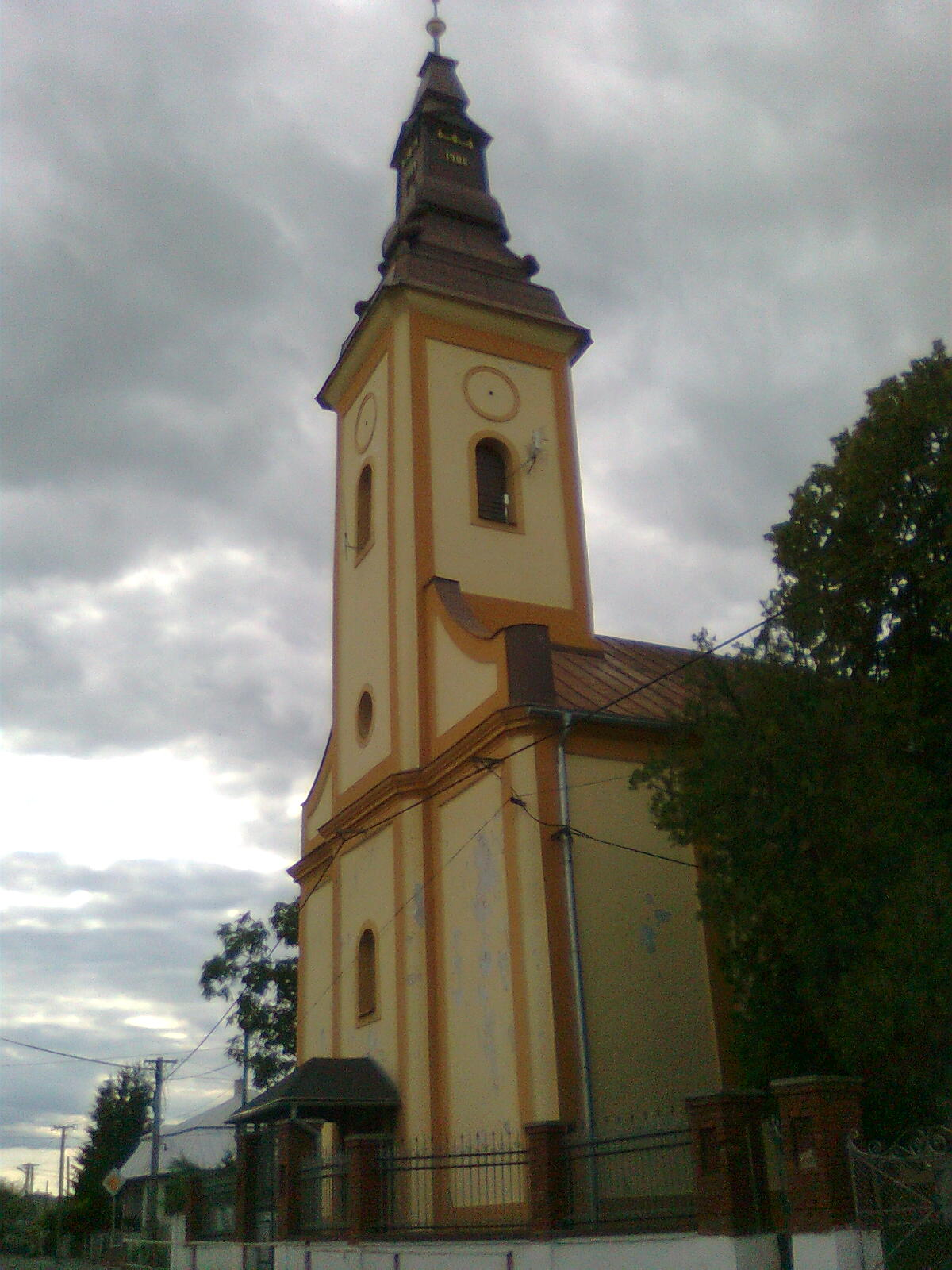
- Reformed church

- Flag

- Location of Veľký Horeš in the Košice Region Location of Veľký Horeš in Slovakia
- Coordinates: 48.38°N 21.92°E
- Country: Slovakia
- Region: Košice Region
- District: Trebišov District
- First mentioned: 1214

Area
  - Total: 18.23 km^{2} (7.04 sq mi)
- Elevation: 99 m (325 ft)

Population (2025)
  - Total: 1,020
- Time zone: UTC+1 (CET)
  - Summer (DST): UTC+2 (CEST)
- Postal code: 765 2
- Area code: +421 56
- Vehicle registration plate (until 2022): TV
- Website: www.velkyhores.sk

Veľký Horeš (Slovak pronunciation: [ˈʋeʎkiː ˈɦɔreʂ]; Hungarian: Nagygéres) is a village and municipality in the Trebišov District in the Košice Region of south-eastern Slovakia.

== History ==
In historical records the village was first mentioned in 1214.

== Geography ==
The municipality lies at an altitude of 99 metres (325 ft) and covers an area of 18.23 km^{2} (7.04 sq mi) (2025).

== Population ==
Population statistic (10 years)
| Year | 1995 | 2005 | 2015 | 2025 |
|---|---|---|---|---|
| Count | 939 | 973 | 1061 | 1020 |
| Difference | | +3.62% | +9.04% | −3.86% |

Population statistic
| Year | 2024 | 2025 |
|---|---|---|
| Count | 1014 | 1020 |
| Difference | | +0.59% |

It has a population of 1020 people (31 December 2025).

=== Ethnicity ===
Census 2021 (1+ %)
| Ethnicity | Number | Fraction |
|---|---|---|
| Hungarian | 677 | 66.24% |
| Slovak | 361 | 35.32% |
| Not found out | 38 | 3.71% |
| Romani | 13 | 1.27% |
| Total | 1022 | |

In year 2021 was 1022 people by ethnicity 677 as Hungarian, 361 as Slovak, 38 as Not found out, 13 as Romani, 6 as Czech, 6 as Ukrainian, 2 as English, 1 as Russian, 1 as Austrian and 1 as Other.

Note on population: The difference values of population numbers in the table "Population statistic" and in the sections "Ethnicity" & "Religion" is caused by the use of various statistical methods.

=== Religion ===
Census 2021 (1+ %)
| Religion | Number | Fraction |
|---|---|---|
| Calvinist Church | 376 | 36.79% |
| Roman Catholic Church | 213 | 20.84% |
| None | 148 | 14.48% |
| Greek Catholic Church | 147 | 14.38% |
| Not found out | 55 | 5.38% |
| Jehovah's Witnesses | 35 | 3.42% |
| Evangelical Church | 34 | 3.33% |
| Total | 1022 | |

In year 2021 was 1022 people by religion 376 from Calvinist Church, 213 from Roman Catholic Church, 148 from None, 147 from Greek Catholic Church, 55 from Not found out, 35 from Jehovah's Witnesses, 34 from Evangelical Church, 6 from Eastern Orthodox Church, 5 from United Methodist Church, 2 from Other and not ascertained christian church and 1 from Baptists Church.

== Facilities ==
The village has a public library, a gym and a football pitch. The municipality has its own birth registry.
