= Ladmovce =

Village and municipality in Slovakia

Ladmovce Ladamóc
- Municipality
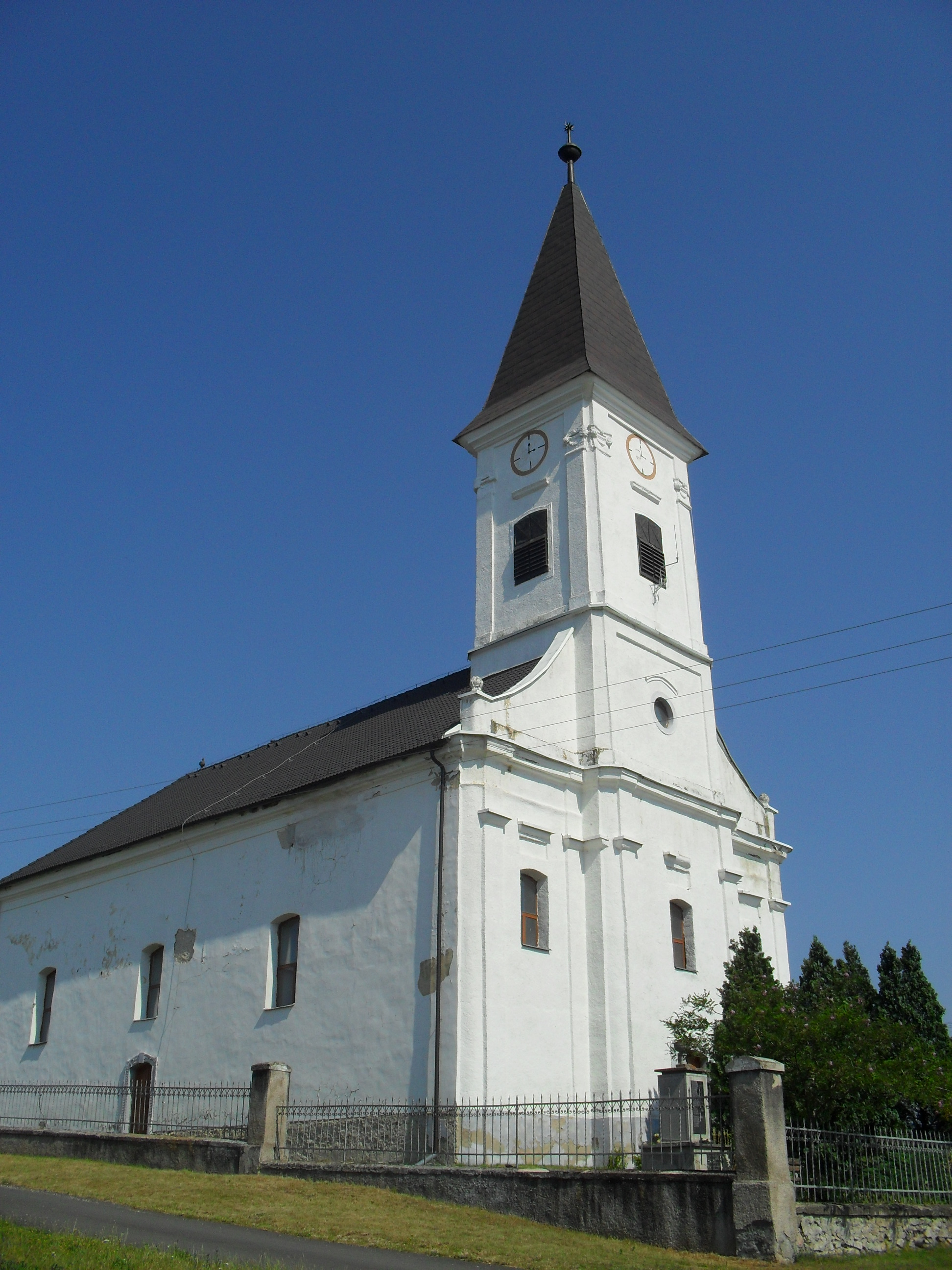

- Flag

- Location of Ladmovce in the Košice Region Location of Ladmovce in Slovakia
- Coordinates: 48.42°N 21.78°E
- Country: Slovakia
- Region: Košice Region
- District: Trebišov District
- First mentioned: 1298

Area
  - Total: 11.32 km^{2} (4.37 sq mi)
- Elevation: 106 m (348 ft)

Population (2025)
  - Total: 304
- Time zone: UTC+1 (CET)
  - Summer (DST): UTC+2 (CEST)
- Postal code: 763 4
- Area code: +421 56
- Vehicle registration plate (until 2022): TV
- Website: www.ladmovce.sk

Ladmovce (Hungarian: Ladamóc) is a village and municipality in the Trebišov District in the Košice Region of south-eastern Slovakia.

== History ==
In historical records the village was first mentioned in 1298.

== Geography ==
The municipality lies at an altitude of 106 metres (348 ft) and covers an area of 11.32 km^{2} (4.37 sq mi) (2025).

== Population ==
Population statistic (10 years)
Year	1995	2005	2015	2025
Count	389	347	321	304
Difference		−10.79%	−7.49%	−5.29%

Population statistic
Year	2024	2025
Count	305	304
Difference		−0.32%

It has a population of 304 people (31 December 2025).

=== Ethnicity ===
Census 2021 (1+ %)
Ethnicity	Number	Fraction
Hungarian	237	77.19%
Slovak	88	28.66%
Not found out	11	3.58%
Total	307	

In year 2021 was 307 people by ethnicity 237 as Hungarian, 88 as Slovak, 11 as Not found out, 1 as Czech, 1 as Romani and 1 as Rusyn.

Note on population: The difference values of population numbers in the table "Population statistic" and in the sections "Ethnicity" & "Religion" is caused by the use of various statistical methods.

=== Religion ===
Census 2021 (1+ %)
Religion	Number	Fraction
Calvinist Church	189	61.56%
Roman Catholic Church	51	16.61%
None	25	8.14%
Greek Catholic Church	13	4.23%
Not found out	12	3.91%
Jehovah's Witnesses	10	3.26%
Evangelical Church	7	2.28%
Total	307	

In year 2021 was 307 people by religion 189 from Calvinist Church, 51 from Roman Catholic Church, 25 from None, 13 from Greek Catholic Church, 12 from Not found out, 10 from Jehovah's Witnesses and 7 from Evangelical Church.

== Facilities ==
The village has a public library and a football pitch. Also a smaller cargo port by the river Bodrog near the village...
