= Hraň =

Village and municipality in Slovakia

Hraň Garany
- Municipality
- Roman Catholic Church of the Finding of the Holy Cross

- Flag

- Location of Hraň in the Košice Region Location of Hraň in Slovakia
- Coordinates: 48.54°N 21.79°E
- Country: Slovakia
- Region: Košice Region
- District: Trebišov District
- First mentioned: 1360

Area
  - Total: 17.40 km^{2} (6.72 sq mi)
- Elevation: 101 m (331 ft)

Population (2025)
  - Total: 1,522
- Time zone: UTC+1 (CET)
  - Summer (DST): UTC+2 (CEST)
- Postal code: 760 3
- Area code: +421 56
- Vehicle registration plate (until 2022): TV
- Website: www.hran.sk

Hraň (Slovak pronunciation: [ɦraɲ]; Hungarian: Garany) is a village and municipality in the Trebišov District in the Košice Region of south-eastern Slovakia.

== History ==
In historical records, the village was likely first mentioned in 1331 as "Gerend" but definitely documented in 1387 as "Garan". It was later recorded under the names Garan, Garany, Parany, Garanya, Garány, Garaňa, Garaň, and has been officially known as Hraň since 1948. The "Garan"-type forms have been described as "Magyarized" written forms of old Slovak name Graň, which is Hraň in modern Slovak.

In 1903, a mansion was built near the village on the slopes of Stuchla Mountain as an estate for the Almássy family. The mansion later housed a youth mental asylum from 1934 until 1938, when it became a detention camp for Polish refugees. From 1942 to 1946 it was established as a concentration camp by Hungarian fascists, before becoming a temporary field hospital for the Soviets, and since 1957 it has served as a children's psychiatric hospital and primary school.

== Geography ==
The municipality lies at an altitude of 101 metres (331 ft) and covers an area of 17.40 km^{2} (6.72 sq mi) (2025).

== Population ==
Population statistic (10 years)
Year	1995	2005	2015	2025
Count	1430	1563	1620	1522
Difference		+9.30%	+3.64%	−6.04%

Population statistic
Year	2024	2025
Count	1528	1522
Difference		−0.39%

It has a population of 1522 people (31 December 2025).

=== Ethnicity ===
Census 2021 (1+%)
Ethnicity	Number	Fraction
Slovak	1455	91.74%
Not found out	112	7.06%
Romani	46	2.9%
Total	1586	

In year 2021 was 1586 people by ethnicity 1455 as Slovak, 112 as Not found out, 46 as Romani, 14 as Hungarian, 7 as Czech, 3 as Irish, 2 as Ukrainian, 2 as Other, 1 as Jewish, 1 as Rusyn, 1 as Romanian and 1 as Polish.

Note on population: The difference values of population numbers in the table "Population statistic" and in the sections "Ethnicity" & "Religion" is caused by the use of various statistical methods.

=== Religion ===
Census 2021 (1+%)
Religion	Number	Fraction
Roman Catholic Church	889	56.05%
Calvinist Church	208	13.11%
Not found out	155	9.77%
Greek Catholic Church	151	9.52%
None	96	6.05%
Jehovah's Witnesses	28	1.77%
Eastern Orthodox Church	23	1.45%
Evangelical Church	19	1.2%
Total	1586	

In year 2021 was 1586 people by religion 889 from Roman Catholic Church, 208 from Calvinist Church, 155 from Not found out, 151 from Greek Catholic Church, 96 from None, 28 from Jehovah's Witnesses, 23 from Eastern Orthodox Church, 19 from Evangelical Church, 9 from Christian Congregations in Slovakia, 2 from Other, 2 from United Methodist Church, 2 from Ad hoc movements, 1 from Old Catholic Church and 1 from Seventh-day Adventist Church.

== Facilities ==
The village has a public library, a gym and a football pitch.

== Genealogical resources ==
The records for genealogical research are available at the state archive "Statny Archiv in Kosice, Slovakia".

- Roman Catholic church records (births/marriages/deaths): 1755–1917 (parish B)
- Greek Catholic church records (births/marriages/deaths): 1773–1937 (parish B)
- Reformed church records (births/marriages/deaths): 1768–1907 (parish B)

== See also ==
- List of municipalities and towns in Slovakia
