= Boľ =

Boľ Boly
- Municipality
- Flag

- Location of Boľ in the Košice Region Location of Boľ in Slovakia
- Coordinates: 48.47°N 21.95°E
- Country: Slovakia
- Region: Košice Region
- District: Trebišov District
- First mentioned: 1332

Area
  - Total: 12.60 km^{2} (4.86 sq mi)
- Elevation: 101 m (331 ft)

Population (2025)
  - Total: 718
- Time zone: UTC+1 (CET)
  - Summer (DST): UTC+2 (CEST)
- Postal code: 765 3
- Area code: +421 56
- Vehicle registration plate (until 2022): TV
- Website: obec-bol.sk

Boľ (Slovak pronunciation: [bɔʎ]; Hungarian: Boly) is a village and municipality in the Trebišov District in the Košice Region of eastern Slovakia.

== Geography ==
The municipality lies at an altitude of 101 metres (331 ft) and covers an area of 12.60 km^{2} (4.86 sq mi) (2025).

== Population ==
Population statistic (10 years)
Year	1995	2005	2015	2025
Count	678	690	725	718
Difference		+1.76%	+5.07%	−0.96%

Population statistic
Year	2024	2025
Count	726	718
Difference		−1.10%

It has a population of 718 people (31 December 2025).

=== Ethnicity ===
Census 2021 (1+ %)
Ethnicity	Number	Fraction
Hungarian	546	74.38%
Slovak	189	25.74%
Not found out	50	6.81%
Romani	16	2.17%
Total	734	

In year 2021 was 734 people by ethnicity 546 as Hungarian, 189 as Slovak, 50 as Not found out, 16 as Romani, 2 as Czech, 1 as Ukrainian, 1 as Austrian, 1 as Greek and 1 as English.

Note on population: The difference values of population numbers in the table "Population statistic" and in the sections "Ethnicity" & "Religion" is caused by the use of various statistical methods.

=== Religion ===
Census 2021 (1+ %)
Religion	Number	Fraction
Roman Catholic Church	345	47%
Calvinist Church	185	25.2%
Greek Catholic Church	73	9.95%
None	58	7.9%
Not found out	52	7.08%
Jehovah's Witnesses	12	1.63%
Total	734	

In year 2021 was 734 people by religion 345 from Roman Catholic Church, 185 from Calvinist Church, 73 from Greek Catholic Church, 58 from None, 52 from Not found out, 12 from Jehovah's Witnesses, 6 from Evangelical Church, 1 from Eastern Orthodox Church, 1 from Other and not ascertained christian church and 1 from Christian Congregations in Slovakia.

== Genealogical resources ==
The records for genealogical research are available at the state archive "Statny Archiv in Kosice, Slovakia"

- Roman Catholic church records (births/marriages/deaths): 1777-1897 (parish A)
- Greek Catholic church records (births/marriages/deaths): 1787-1900 (parish B)
- Reformated church records (births/marriages/deaths): 1773-1909 (parish B)

== See also ==
- List of municipalities and towns in Slovakia
