= Zbehňov =

Village and municipality in Slovakia

Zbehňov Zebegnyő
- Municipality
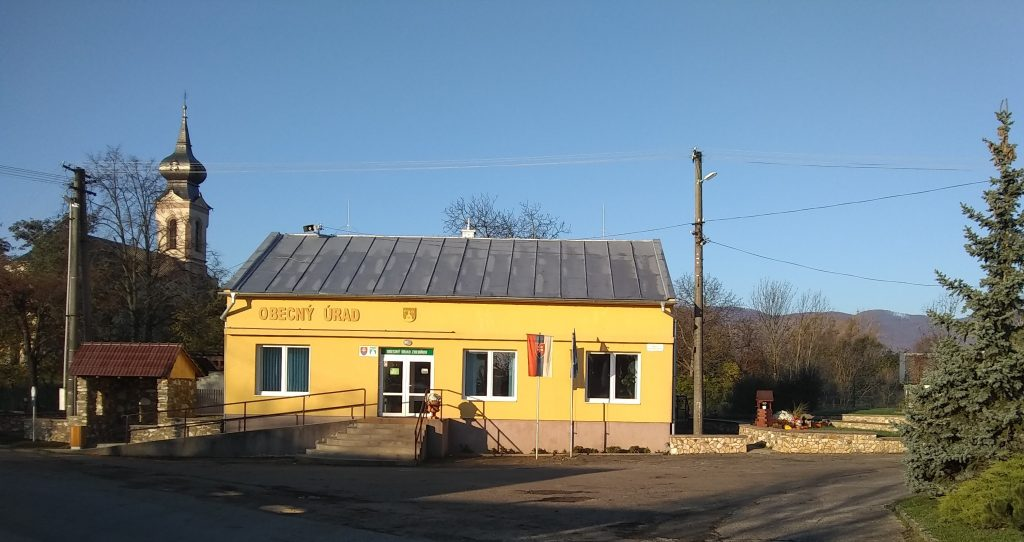

- Flag

- Location of Zbehňov in the Košice Region Location of Zbehňov in Slovakia
- Coordinates: 48.68°N 21.63°E
- Country: Slovakia
- Region: Košice Region
- District: Trebišov District
- First mentioned: 1290

Area
  - Total: 5.03 km^{2} (1.94 sq mi)
- Elevation: 170 m (560 ft)

Population (2025)
  - Total: 376
- Time zone: UTC+1 (CET)
  - Summer (DST): UTC+2 (CEST)
- Postal code: 780 1
- Area code: +421 56
- Vehicle registration plate (until 2022): TV
- Website: www.zbehnov.sk

Zbehňov (Hungarian: Zebegnyő) is a village and municipality in the Trebišov District in the Košice Region of south-eastern Slovakia.

== History ==
In historical records the village was first mentioned in 1290.

== Geography ==
The municipality lies at an altitude of 170 metres (560 ft) and covers an area of 5.03 km^{2} (1.94 sq mi) (2025).

== Population ==
Population statistic (10 years)
Year	1995	2005	2015	2025
Count	267	291	354	376
Difference		+8.98%	+21.64%	+6.21%

Population statistic
Year	2024	2025
Count	376	376
Difference		+0%

It has a population of 376 people (31 December 2025).

=== Ethnicity ===
Census 2021 (1+ %)
Ethnicity	Number	Fraction
Slovak	281	78.49%
Romani	96	26.81%
Not found out	5	1.39%
Total	358	

In year 2021 was 358 people by ethnicity 281 as Slovak, 96 as Romani, 5 as Not found out, 3 as Rusyn, 3 as Other, 1 as Polish and 1 as German.

Note on population: The difference values of population numbers in the table "Population statistic" and in the sections "Ethnicity" & "Religion" is caused by the use of various statistical methods.

=== Religion ===
Census 2021 (1+ %)
Religion	Number	Fraction
Greek Catholic Church	141	39.39%
None	117	32.68%
Roman Catholic Church	88	24.58%
Evangelical Church	4	1.12%
Total	358	

In year 2021 was 358 people by religion 141 from Greek Catholic Church, 117 from None, 88 from Roman Catholic Church, 4 from Evangelical Church, 3 from Jehovah's Witnesses, 2 from Eastern Orthodox Church, 1 from Calvinist Church, 1 from Paganism and natural spirituality and 1 from Not found out.

== Facilities ==
The village has a church and a football pitch.
