= Plechotice =

Plechotice Pelejte
- Municipality
- Flag

- Location of Plechotice in the Košice Region Location of Plechotice in Slovakia
- Coordinates: 48.63°N 21.63°E
- Country: Slovakia
- Region: Košice Region
- District: Trebišov District
- First mentioned: 1332

Area
  - Total: 12.93 km^{2} (4.99 sq mi)
- Elevation: 142 m (466 ft)

Population (2025)
  - Total: 743
- Time zone: UTC+1 (CET)
  - Summer (DST): UTC+2 (CEST)
- Postal code: 761 1
- Area code: +421 56
- Vehicle registration plate (until 2022): TV
- Website: www.plechotice.sk

Plechotice (Hungarian: Pelejte) is a village and municipality in the Trebišov District in the Košice Region of south-eastern Slovakia.

== Etymology ==
The name comes from the Slovak plechota—a land without vegetation. 1332 Pellechte.

== History ==
In historical records the village was first mentioned in 1324.

== Geography ==
The municipality lies at an altitude of 142 metres (466 ft) and covers an area of 12.93 km^{2} (4.99 sq mi) (2025).

== Population ==
Population statistic (10 years)
Year	1995	2005	2015	2025
Count	747	774	793	743
Difference		+3.61%	+2.45%	−6.30%

Population statistic
Year	2024	2025
Count	727	743
Difference		+2.20%

It has a population of 743 people (31 December 2025).

=== Ethnicity ===
Census 2021 (1+ %)
Ethnicity	Number	Fraction
Slovak	722	96.39%
Not found out	27	3.6%
Total	749	

In year 2021 was 749 people by ethnicity 722 as Slovak, 27 as Not found out, 7 as Romani, 3 as Czech, 2 as Rusyn, 2 as Hungarian, 2 as Other and 1 as Russian.

Note on population: The difference values of population numbers in the table "Population statistic" and in the sections "Ethnicity" & "Religion" is caused by the use of various statistical methods.

=== Religion ===
Census 2021 (1+ %)
Religion	Number	Fraction
Roman Catholic Church	541	72.23%
Greek Catholic Church	117	15.62%
None	36	4.81%
Not found out	20	2.67%
Jehovah's Witnesses	15	2%
Total	749	

In year 2021 was 749 people by religion 541 from Roman Catholic Church, 117 from Greek Catholic Church, 36 from None, 20 from Not found out, 15 from Jehovah's Witnesses, 6 from Calvinist Church, 5 from Evangelical Church, 2 from Other and not ascertained christian church, 2 from Islam, 2 from Ad hoc movements, 1 from Jewish community, 1 from Paganism and natural spirituality and 1 from Christian Congregations in Slovakia.

== Facilities ==
The village has a public library and a football pitch
