= Sirník =

Sirník Szürnyeg
- Municipality
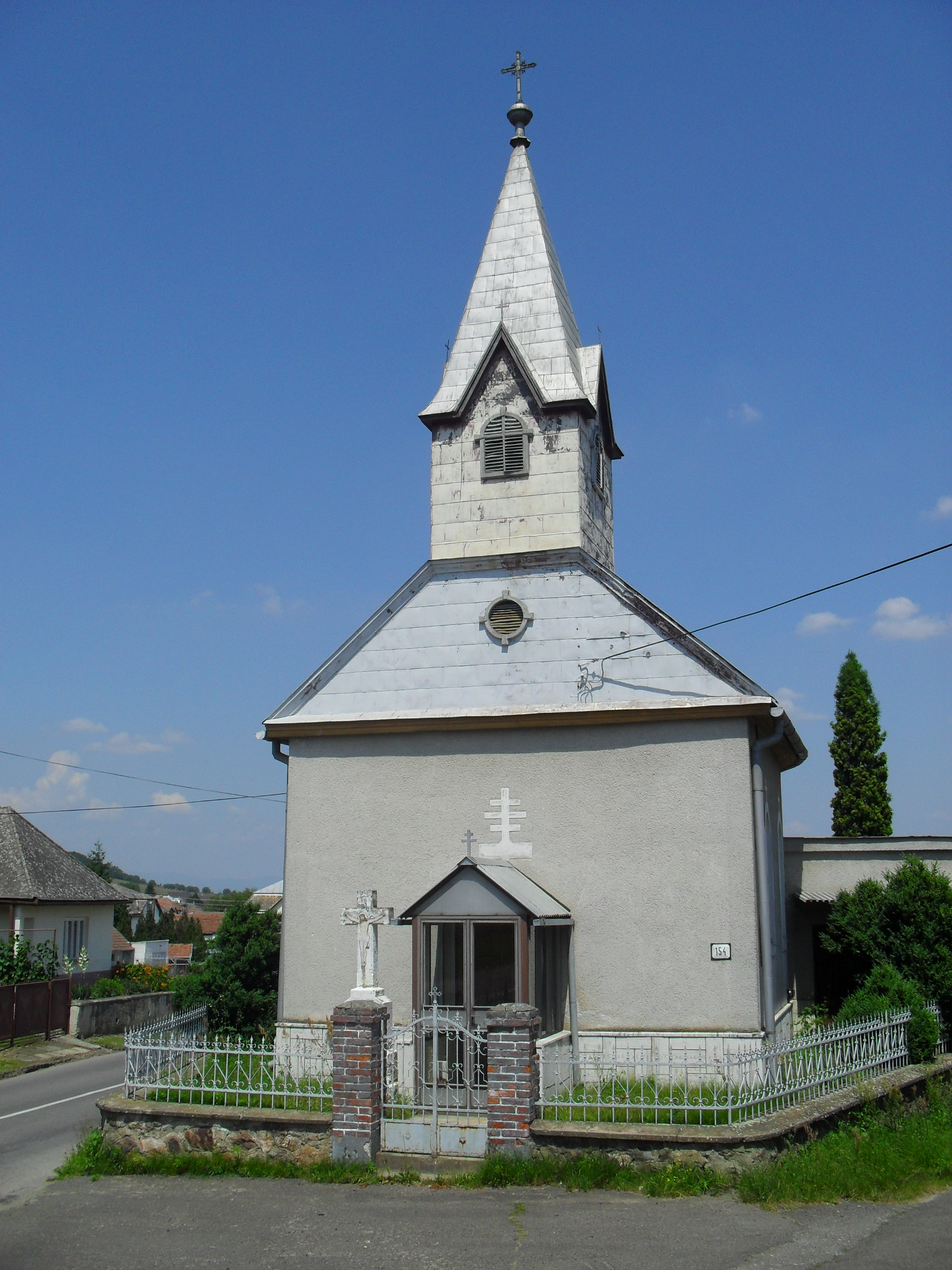

- Flag

- Location of Sirník in the Košice Region Location of Sirník in Slovakia
- Coordinates: 48.52°N 21.82°E
- Country: Slovakia
- Region: Košice Region
- District: Trebišov District
- First mentioned: 1403

Area
  - Total: 5.82 km^{2} (2.25 sq mi)
- Elevation: 110 m (360 ft)

Population (2025)
  - Total: 548
- Time zone: UTC+1 (CET)
  - Summer (DST): UTC+2 (CEST)
- Postal code: 760 3
- Area code: +421 56
- Vehicle registration plate (until 2022): TV
- Website: www.sirnik.sk

Sirník (Hungarian: Szürnyeg) is a village and municipality in the Trebišov District in the Košice Region of south-eastern Slovakia.

== History ==
In historical records the village was first mentioned in 1403.

== Geography ==
The municipality lies at an altitude of 110 metres (360 ft) and covers an area of 5.82 km^{2} (2.25 sq mi) (2025).

== Population ==
Population statistic (10 years)
Year	1995	2005	2015	2025
Count	592	612	583	548
Difference		+3.37%	−4.73%	−6.00%

Population statistic
Year	2024	2025
Count	550	548
Difference		−0.36%

It has a population of 548 people (31 December 2025).

=== Ethnicity ===
Census 2021 (1+ %)
Ethnicity	Number	Fraction
Slovak	453	79.89%
Hungarian	124	21.86%
Not found out	21	3.7%
Romani	10	1.76%
Total	567	

In year 2021 was 567 people by ethnicity 453 as Slovak, 124 as Hungarian, 21 as Not found out, 10 as Romani, 4 as Czech, 3 as Chinese, 1 as Rusyn and 1 as Other.

Note on population: The difference values of population numbers in the table "Population statistic" and in the sections "Ethnicity" & "Religion" is caused by the use of various statistical methods.

=== Religion ===
Census 2021 (1+ %)
Religion	Number	Fraction
Calvinist Church	160	28.22%
Jehovah's Witnesses	128	22.57%
Greek Catholic Church	100	17.64%
None	75	13.23%
Roman Catholic Church	68	11.99%
Not found out	22	3.88%
Eastern Orthodox Church	7	1.23%
Evangelical Church	6	1.06%
Total	567	

In year 2021 was 567 people by religion 160 from Calvinist Church, 128 from Jehovah's Witnesses, 100 from Greek Catholic Church, 75 from None, 68 from Roman Catholic Church, 22 from Not found out, 7 from Eastern Orthodox Church, 6 from Evangelical Church and 1 from Ad hoc movements.

== Facilities ==
The village has a public library.
