= Brehov =

Village in Košice Region of Slovakia

Brehov Imreg
- Municipality
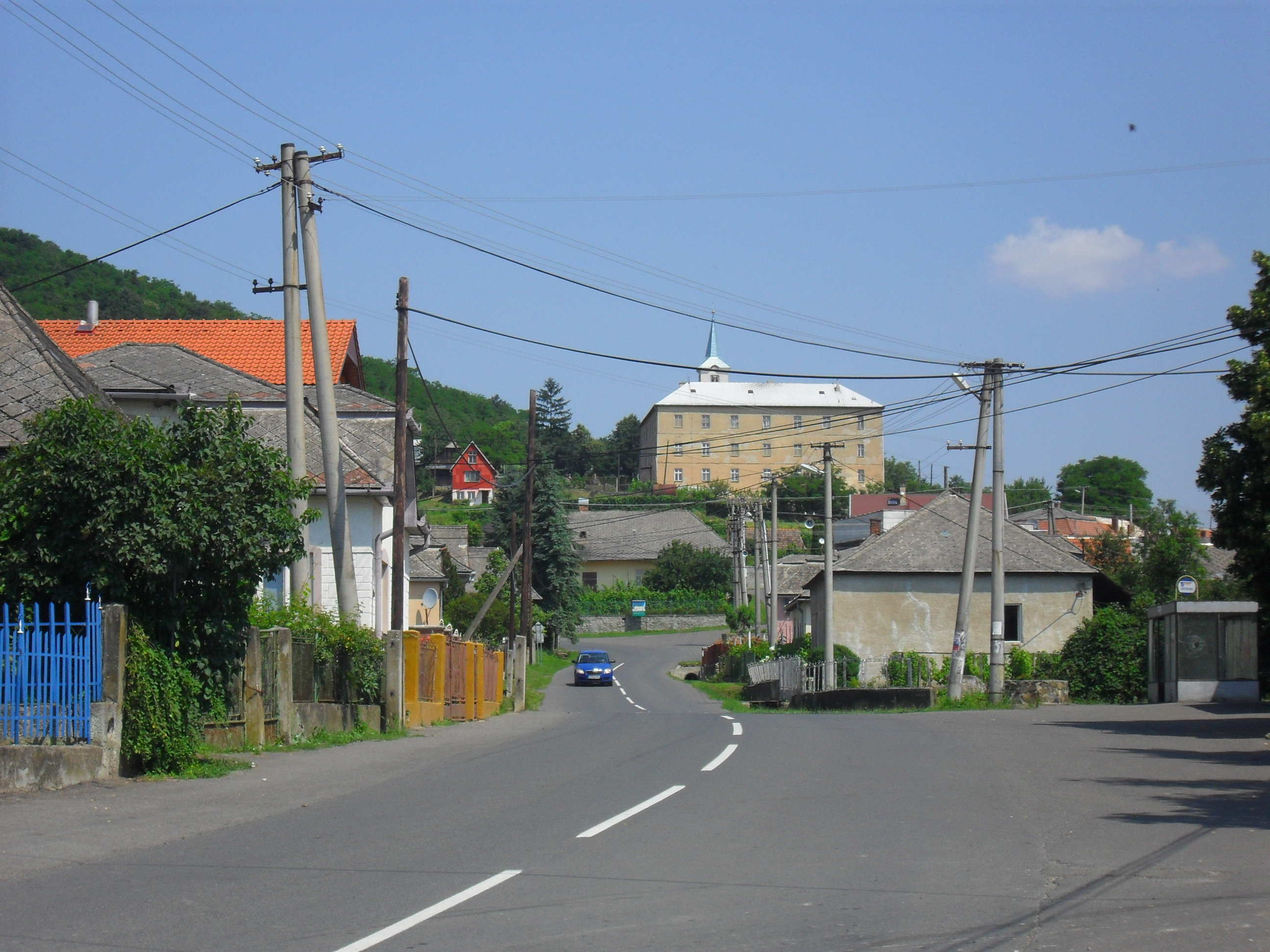

- Flag

- Location of Brehov in the Košice Region Location of Brehov in Slovakia
- Coordinates: 48.48°N 21.82°E
- Country: Slovakia
- Region: Košice Region
- District: Trebišov District
- First mentioned: 1309

Area
  - Total: 7.90 km^{2} (3.05 sq mi)
- Elevation: 111 m (364 ft)

Population (2025)
  - Total: 557
- Time zone: UTC+1 (CET)
  - Summer (DST): UTC+2 (CEST)
- Postal code: 760 5
- Area code: +421 56
- Vehicle registration plate (until 2022): TV
- Website: obecbrehov.sk

Brehov (Slovak pronunciation: [ˈbreɦɔw]; Hungarian: Imreg) is a village and municipality in the Trebišov District in the Košice Region of eastern Slovakia.

== History ==
In historical records the village was first mentioned in 1309. A convent of Franciscans friars was founded in 1752.

== Geography ==
The municipality lies at an altitude of 111 metres (364 ft) and covers an area of 7.90 km^{2} (3.05 sq mi) (2025).

== Population ==
Population statistic (10 years)
Year	1995	2005	2015	2025
Count	672	636	595	557
Difference		−5.35%	−6.44%	−6.38%

Population statistic
Year	2024	2025
Count	564	557
Difference		−1.24%

It has a population of 557 people (31 December 2025).

=== Ethnicity ===
Census 2021 (1+ %)
Ethnicity	Number	Fraction
Slovak	463	79.41%
Hungarian	175	30.01%
Not found out	13	2.22%
Total	583	

In year 2021 was 583 people by ethnicity 463 as Slovak, 175 as Hungarian, 13 as Not found out, 5 as Romani, 2 as Other and 1 as Polish.

Note on population: The difference values of population numbers in the table "Population statistic" and in the sections "Ethnicity" & "Religion" is caused by the use of various statistical methods.

=== Religion ===
Census 2021 (1+ %)
Religion	Number	Fraction
Roman Catholic Church	335	57.46%
Calvinist Church	94	16.12%
None	78	13.38%
Jehovah's Witnesses	42	7.2%
Greek Catholic Church	17	2.92%
Not found out	12	2.06%
Total	583	

In year 2021 was 583 people by religion 335 from Roman Catholic Church, 94 from Calvinist Church, 78 from None, 42 from Jehovah's Witnesses, 17 from Greek Catholic Church, 12 from Not found out, 2 from Christian Congregations in Slovakia, 2 from Evangelical Church and 1 from Eastern Orthodox Church.

== Facilities ==
The village has a public library and a football pitch.

== Genealogical resources ==
The records for genealogical research are available at the state archive "Statny Archiv in Kosice, Slovakia"

- Roman Catholic church records (births/marriages/deaths): 1752–1902 (parish A)
- Greek Catholic church records (births/marriages/deaths): 1772–1895 (parish B)
- Reformated church records (births/marriages/deaths): 1816–1895 (parish B)

== See also ==
- List of municipalities and towns in Slovakia
