= Kožuchov =

Village and municipality in Slovakia

Kožuchov Kazsó
- Municipality
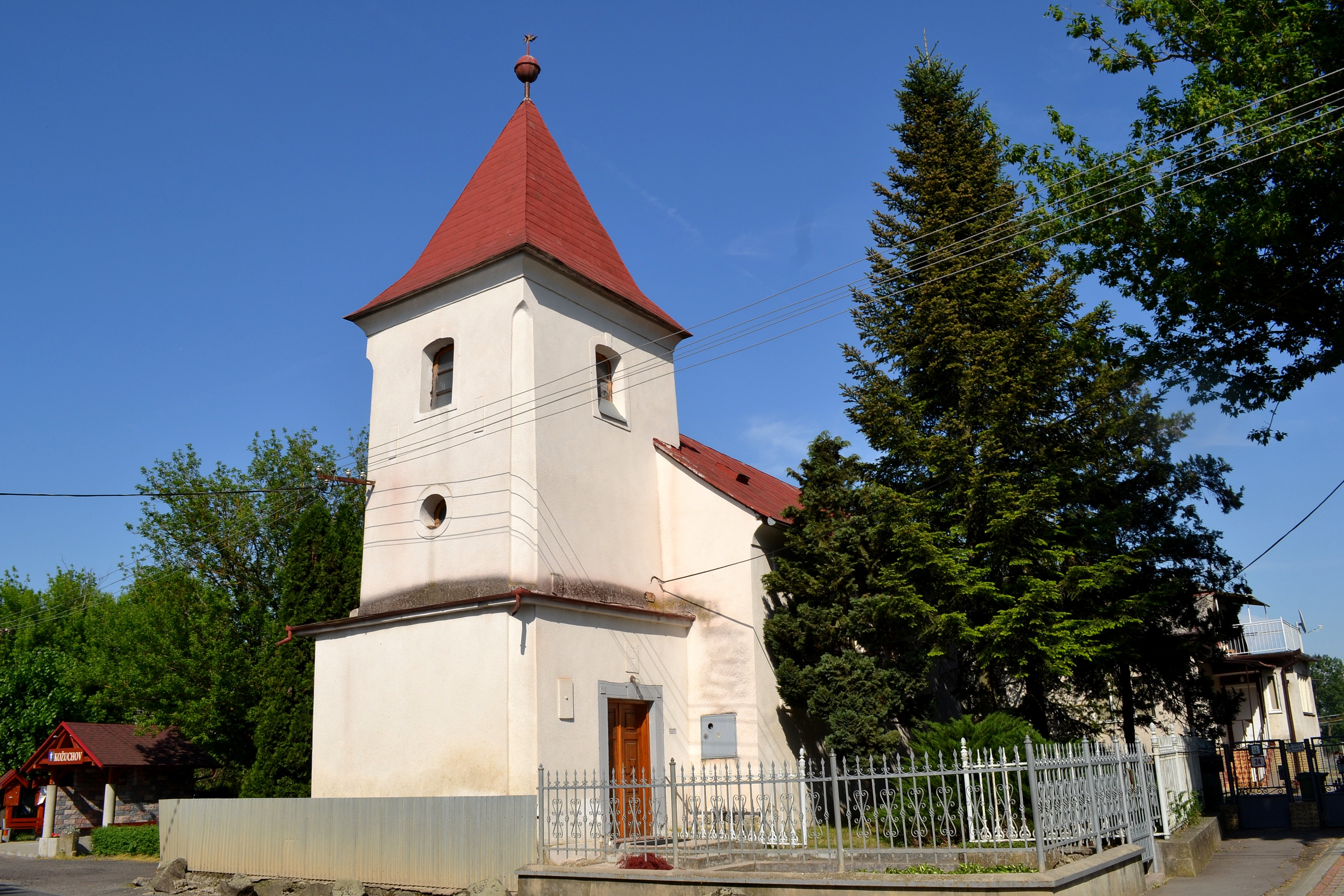

- Flag

- Location of Kožuchov in the Košice Region Location of Kožuchov in Slovakia
- Coordinates: 48.57°N 21.73°E
- Country: Slovakia
- Region: Košice Region
- District: Trebišov District
- First mentioned: 1330

Area
  - Total: 5.86 km^{2} (2.26 sq mi)
- Elevation: 106 m (348 ft)

Population (2025)
  - Total: 173
- Time zone: UTC+1 (CET)
  - Summer (DST): UTC+2 (CEST)
- Postal code: 760 1
- Area code: +421 56
- Vehicle registration plate (until 2022): TV

Kožuchov (Slovak pronunciation: [ˈkɔʐuxɔw]; Hungarian: Kazsó) is a village and municipality in the Trebišov District in the Košice Region of south-eastern Slovakia.

== History ==
In historical records the village was first mentioned in 1330.

== Geography ==
The municipality lies at an altitude of 106 metres (348 ft) and covers an area of 5.86 km^{2} (2.26 sq mi) (2025).

== Population ==
Population statistic (10 years)
| Year | 1995 | 2005 | 2015 | 2025 |
|---|---|---|---|---|
| Count | 227 | 238 | 212 | 173 |
| Difference | | +4.84% | −10.92% | −18.39% |

Population statistic
| Year | 2024 | 2025 |
|---|---|---|
| Count | 171 | 173 |
| Difference | | +1.16% |

It has a population of 173 people (31 December 2025).

=== Ethnicity ===
Census 2021 (1+ %)
| Ethnicity | Number | Fraction |
|---|---|---|
| Slovak | 178 | 96.73% |
| Not found out | 4 | 2.17% |
| Czech | 2 | 1.08% |
| Ukrainian | 2 | 1.08% |
| Total | 184 | |

In year 2021 was 184 people by ethnicity 178 as Slovak, 4 as Not found out, 2 as Czech and 2 as Ukrainian.

Note on population: The difference values of population numbers in the table "Population statistic" and in the sections "Ethnicity" & "Religion" is caused by the use of various statistical methods.

=== Religion ===
Census 2021 (1+ %)
| Religion | Number | Fraction |
|---|---|---|
| Greek Catholic Church | 66 | 35.87% |
| Roman Catholic Church | 57 | 30.98% |
| Calvinist Church | 42 | 22.83% |
| Evangelical Church | 7 | 3.8% |
| None | 5 | 2.72% |
| Not found out | 4 | 2.17% |
| Eastern Orthodox Church | 2 | 1.09% |
| Total | 184 | |

In year 2021 was 184 people by religion 66 from Greek Catholic Church, 57 from Roman Catholic Church, 42 from Calvinist Church, 7 from Evangelical Church, 5 from None, 4 from Not found out, 2 from Eastern Orthodox Church and 1 from Jehovah's Witnesses.

== Facilities ==
The village has a public library and a football pitch.

== Genealogical resources ==
The records for genealogical research are available at the state archive "Statny Archiv in Kosice, Slovakia"

- Roman Catholic church records (births/marriages/deaths): 1755-1917 (parish B)

== See also ==
- List of municipalities and towns in Slovakia
