= Slivník =

Slivník Szilvásújfalu
- Municipality
- Flag

- Location of Slivník in the Košice Region Location of Slivník in Slovakia
- Coordinates: 48.60°N 21.56°E
- Country: Slovakia
- Region: Košice Region
- District: Trebišov District
- First mentioned: 1321

Government
  - Mayor: Ján Michalko (Ind.)

Area
  - Total: 11.30 km^{2} (4.36 sq mi)
- Elevation: 172 m (564 ft)

Population (2025)
  - Total: 755
- Time zone: UTC+1 (CET)
  - Summer (DST): UTC+2 (CEST)
- Postal code: 761 2
- Area code: +421 56
- Vehicle registration plate (until 2022): TV
- Website: www.slivnik.sk

Slivník, formerly Silvaš (Hungarian: Szilvásújfalu) is a village and municipality in the Trebišov District in the Košice Region of eastern Slovakia.

== Geography ==
The municipality lies at an altitude of 172 metres (564 ft) and covers an area of 11.30 km^{2} (4.36 sq mi) (2025).

== History ==
Slivník was first mentioned in 1321.

== Population ==
Population statistic (10 years)
Year	1995	2005	2015	2025
Count	795	781	773	755
Difference		−1.76%	−1.02%	−2.32%

Population statistic
Year	2024	2025
Count	760	755
Difference		−0.65%

It has a population of 755 people (31 December 2025).

=== Ethnicity ===
Census 2021 (1+ %)
Ethnicity	Number	Fraction
Slovak	735	97.86%
Not found out	17	2.26%
Total	751	

In year 2021 was 751 people by ethnicity 735 as Slovak, 17 as Not found out, 4 as Czech, 2 as Hungarian, 1 as Jewish, 1 as Irish, 1 as Romanian and 1 as Other.

Note on population: The difference values of population numbers in the table "Population statistic" and in the sections "Ethnicity" & "Religion" is caused by the use of various statistical methods.

=== Religion ===
Census 2021 (1+ %)
Religion	Number	Fraction
Roman Catholic Church	480	63.91%
Greek Catholic Church	181	24.1%
None	57	7.59%
Not found out	15	2%
Total	751	

In year 2021 was 751 people by religion 480 from Roman Catholic Church, 181 from Greek Catholic Church, 57 from None, 15 from Not found out, 5 from Calvinist Church, 4 from Evangelical Church, 2 from Other and not ascertained christian church, 2 from Jehovah's Witnesses, 2 from Other, 1 from Buddhism, 1 from Apostolic Church and 1 from Ad hoc movements.
