= Svätá Mária =

Municipality of Slovakia

Svätá Mária Szentmária
- Municipality
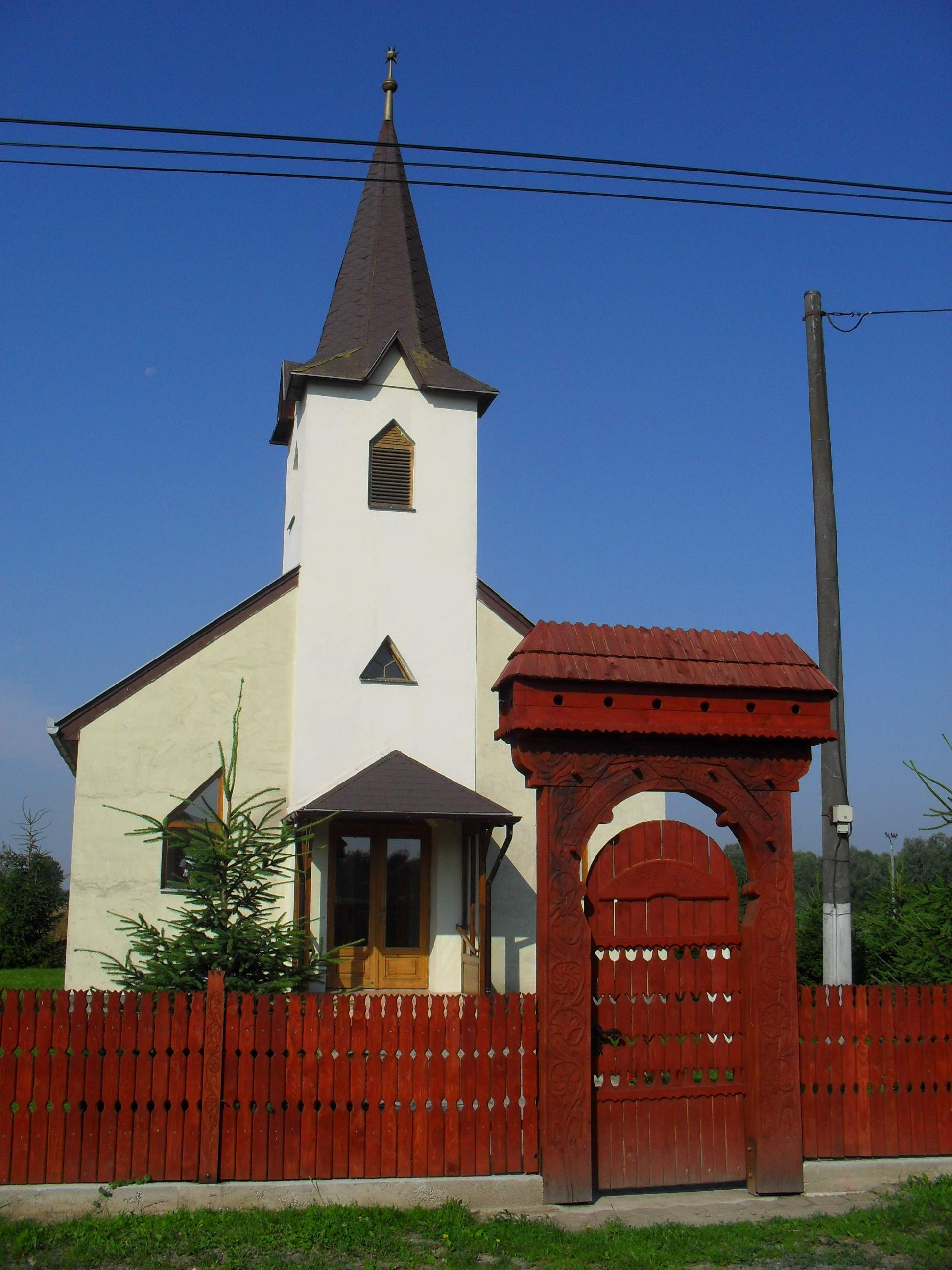
- Reformed church in Pavlovo (Pálfölgye)

- Flag Coat of arms

- Location of Svätá Mária in the Košice Region Location of Svätá Mária in Slovakia
- Coordinates: 48.45°N 21.83°E
- Country: Slovakia
- Region: Košice Region
- District: Trebišov District
- First mentioned: 1261

Area
  - Total: 12.94 km^{2} (5.00 sq mi)
- Elevation: 99 m (325 ft)

Population (2025)
  - Total: 500
- Time zone: UTC+1 (CET)
  - Summer (DST): UTC+2 (CEST)
- Postal code: 0763 5
- Area code: +421 56
- Vehicle registration plate (until 2022): TV
- Website: www.svatamaria.sk

Svätá Mária (Hungarian: Bodrogszentmária) is a village and municipality in the Trebišov District in the Košice Region of south-eastern Slovakia.

== History ==
In historical records the village was first mentioned in 1261.

== Geography ==
The municipality lies at an altitude of 99 metres (325 ft) and covers an area of 12.94 km^{2} (5.00 sq mi) (2025).

== Population ==
Population statistic (10 years)
Year	1995	2005	2015	2025
Count	588	612	571	500
Difference		+4.08%	−6.69%	−12.43%

Population statistic
Year	2024	2025
Count	502	500
Difference		−0.39%

It has a population of 500 people (31 December 2025).

=== Ethnicity ===
Census 2021 (1+ %)
Ethnicity	Number	Fraction
Hungarian	412	77.44%
Slovak	129	24.24%
Not found out	21	3.94%
Total	532	

In year 2021 was 532 people by ethnicity 412 as Hungarian, 129 as Slovak, 21 as Not found out, 2 as Other, 1 as Rusyn, 1 as Croatian and 1 as Bulgarian.

Note on population: The difference values of population numbers in the table "Population statistic" and in the sections "Ethnicity" & "Religion" is caused by the use of various statistical methods.

=== Religion ===
Census 2021 (1+ %)
Religion	Number	Fraction
Roman Catholic Church	273	51.32%
Greek Catholic Church	103	19.36%
Calvinist Church	90	16.92%
None	39	7.33%
Not found out	14	2.63%
Jehovah's Witnesses	6	1.13%
Total	532	

In year 2021 was 532 people by religion 273 from Roman Catholic Church, 103 from Greek Catholic Church, 90 from Calvinist Church, 39 from None, 14 from Not found out, 6 from Jehovah's Witnesses, 5 from Evangelical Church, 1 from Paganism and natural spirituality and 1 from Other.

== Facilities ==
The village has a public library and a football pitch. There's also 3 churches, one of them being a pilgrimage site.
