= Strážne =

Strážne Őrös
- Municipality
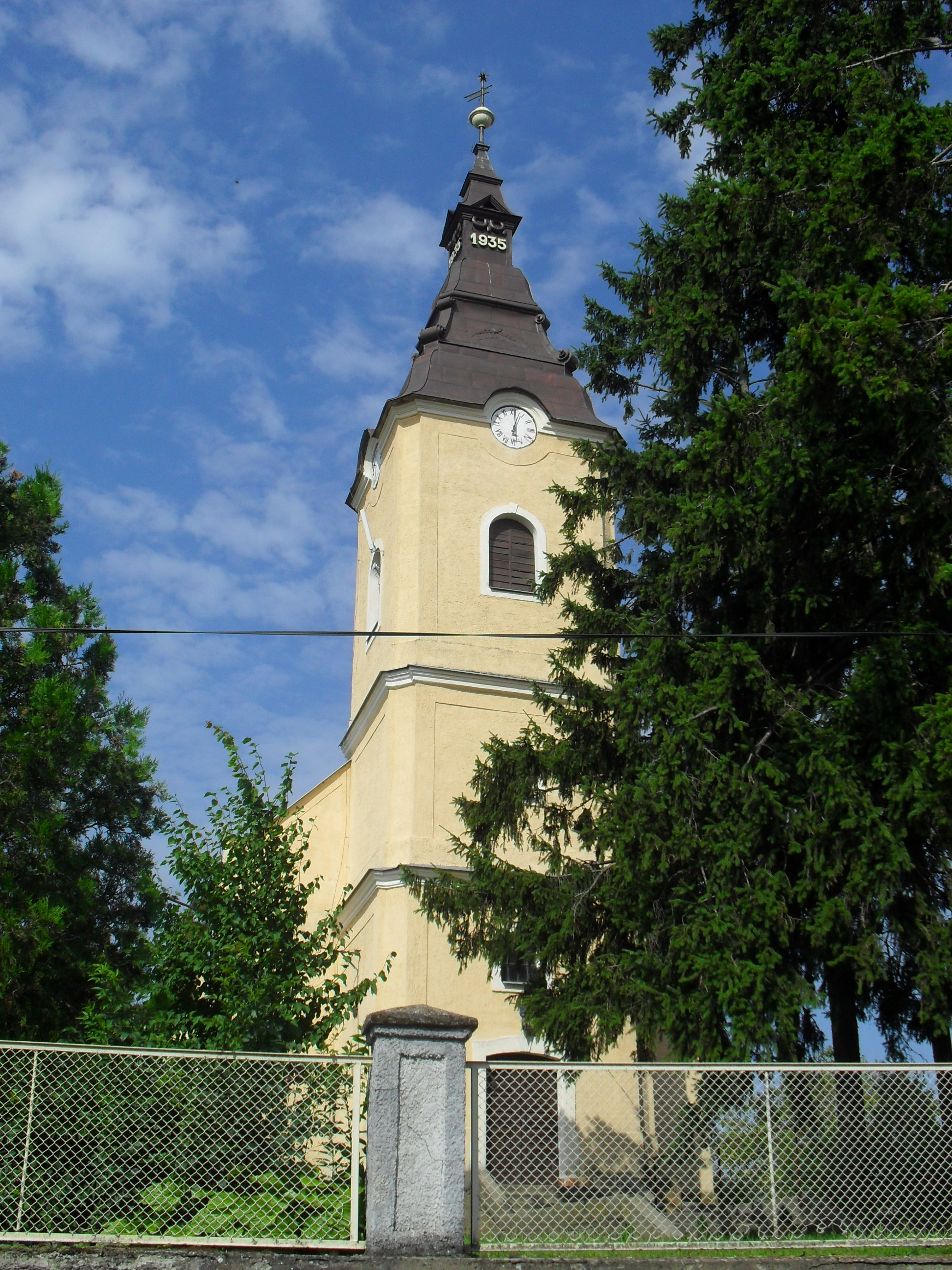

- Flag

- Location of Strážne in the Košice Region Location of Strážne in Slovakia
- Coordinates: 48.365°N 21.869°E
- Country: Slovakia
- Region: Košice Region
- District: Trebišov District
- First mentioned: 1310

Area
  - Total: 16.71 km^{2} (6.45 sq mi)
- Elevation: 99 m (325 ft)

Population (2025)
  - Total: 563
- Time zone: UTC+1 (CET)
  - Summer (DST): UTC+2 (CEST)
- Postal code: 765 2
- Area code: +421 56
- Vehicle registration plate (until 2022): TV
- Website: www.strazne.sk

Strážne (Hungarian: Őrös) is a village and municipality in the Trebišov District in the Košice Region of south-eastern Slovakia. It is some 353 km east of Bratislava, the country's capital. Formerly a part of Hungary, there are more ethnic Hungarians located in Strážne than Slovaks despite it being Slovak territory - 596 Hungarians to 51 Slovaks - and being part of many Hungarian settlements in Slovakia on the border.

Its Hungarian name 'Örös' comes from the Hungarian name Örs although historical documents show the name to be 'Őrös'

== Geography ==
The municipality lies at an altitude of 99 metres (325 ft) and covers an area of 16.71 km^{2} (6.45 sq mi) (2025).

== Population ==
Population statistic (10 years)
Year	1995	2005	2015	2025
Count	709	683	613	563
Difference		−3.66%	−10.24%	−8.15%

Population statistic
Year	2024	2025
Count	566	563
Difference		−0.53%

It has a population of 563 people (31 December 2025).

=== Ethnicity ===
Census 2021 (1+ %)
Ethnicity	Number	Fraction
Hungarian	483	82.56%
Slovak	87	14.87%
Not found out	35	5.98%
Total	585	

In year 2021 was 585 people by ethnicity 483 as Hungarian, 87 as Slovak, 35 as Not found out and 1 as Rusyn.

Note on population: The difference values of population numbers in the table "Population statistic" and in the sections "Ethnicity" & "Religion" is caused by the use of various statistical methods.

=== Religion ===
Census 2021 (1+ %)
Religion	Number	Fraction
Calvinist Church	336	57.44%
Roman Catholic Church	104	17.78%
None	52	8.89%
Not found out	46	7.86%
Greek Catholic Church	21	3.59%
United Methodist Church	8	1.37%
Evangelical Church	8	1.37%
Total	585	

In year 2021 was 585 people by religion 336 from Calvinist Church, 104 from Roman Catholic Church, 52 from None, 46 from Not found out, 21 from Greek Catholic Church, 8 from United Methodist Church, 8 from Evangelical Church, 5 from Jehovah's Witnesses, 3 from Eastern Orthodox Church, 1 from Other and not ascertained christian church and 1 from Christian Congregations in Slovakia.

== History ==
Located in the village there is a reformed church. First recorded around 1700 as a wooden church however this church was later destroyed, thestone church located on this site was built in 1806 however it was burnt down 35 years later in 1841 and major reconstruction did not start until 1877 and end until 1894. A renovation started in 1935 and has been a functioning place of worship ever since.
