= Zemplínske Jastrabie =

Zemplínske Jastrabie Magyarsas
- Municipality
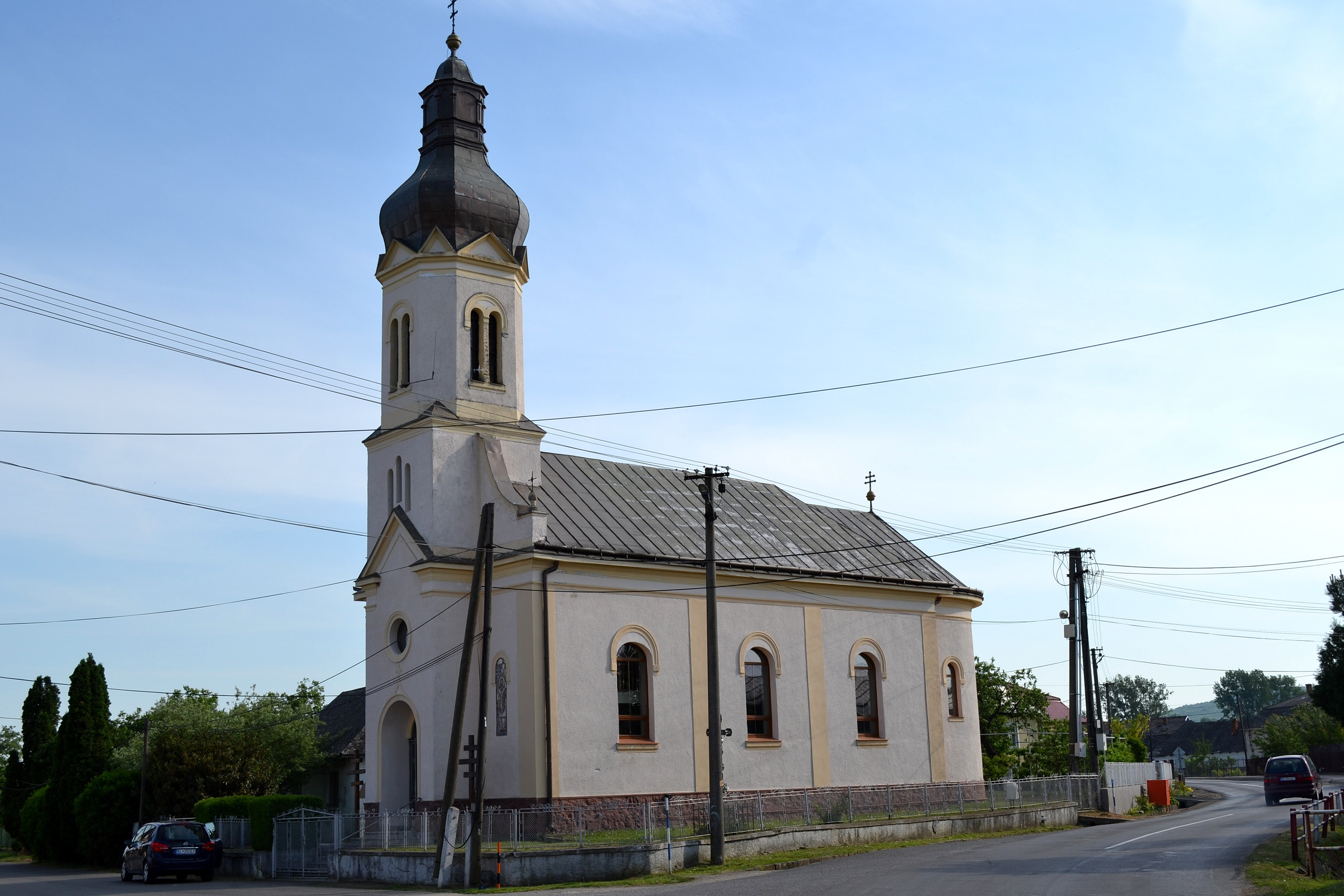
- Church of Death of Good Mother

- Flag

- Location of Zemplínske Jastrabie in the Košice Region Location of Zemplínske Jastrabie in Slovakia
- Coordinates: 48.50°N 21.77°E
- Country: Slovakia
- Region: Košice Region
- District: Trebišov District
- First mentioned: 1272

Area
  - Total: 10.73 km^{2} (4.14 sq mi)
- Elevation: 115 m (377 ft)

Population (2025)
  - Total: 643
- Time zone: UTC+1 (CET)
  - Summer (DST): UTC+2 (CEST)
- Postal code: 760 4
- Area code: +421 56
- Vehicle registration plate (until 2022): TV
- Website: zemplinskejastrabie.sk

Zemplínske Jastrabie (Slovak pronunciation: [ˈzempliːnske ˈjastrabɪe]; Hungarian: Magyarsas) is a village and municipality in the Trebišov District in the Košice Region of eastern Slovakia.

== History ==
In historical records the village was first mentioned in 1272.

== Geography ==
The municipality lies at an altitude of 115 metres (377 ft) and covers an area of 10.73 km^{2} (4.14 sq mi) (2025).

== Population ==
Population statistic (10 years)
Year	1995	2005	2015	2025
Count	603	629	672	643
Difference		+4.31%	+6.83%	−4.31%

Population statistic
Year	2024	2025
Count	651	643
Difference		−1.22%

It has a population of 643 people (31 December 2025).

=== Ethnicity ===
Census 2021 (1+ %)
Ethnicity	Number	Fraction
Slovak	617	95.95%
Not found out	19	2.95%
Rusyn	9	1.39%
Total	643	

In year 2021 was 643 people by ethnicity 617 as Slovak, 19 as Not found out, 9 as Rusyn, 6 as Romani, 6 as Hungarian, 3 as Czech, 2 as Other and 1 as Ukrainian.

Note on population: The difference values of population numbers in the table "Population statistic" and in the sections "Ethnicity" & "Religion" is caused by the use of various statistical methods.

=== Religion ===
Census 2021 (1+ %)
Religion	Number	Fraction
Roman Catholic Church	313	48.68%
Greek Catholic Church	179	27.84%
Calvinist Church	44	6.84%
None	44	6.84%
Not found out	28	4.35%
Jehovah's Witnesses	14	2.18%
Eastern Orthodox Church	9	1.4%
Evangelical Church	7	1.09%
Total	643	

In year 2021 was 643 people by religion 313 from Roman Catholic Church, 179 from Greek Catholic Church, 44 from Calvinist Church, 44 from None, 28 from Not found out, 14 from Jehovah's Witnesses, 9 from Eastern Orthodox Church, 7 from Evangelical Church and 5 from Ad hoc movements.

== Facilities ==
The village has a public library and a football pitch.
