= Luhyňa =

Village and municipality in Slovakia

Luhyňa Legenye
- Municipality
- Flag

- Location of Luhyňa in the Košice Region Location of Luhyňa in Slovakia
- Coordinates: 48.48°N 21.63°E
- Country: Slovakia
- Region: Košice Region
- District: Trebišov District
- First mentioned: 1263

Area
  - Total: 6.83 km^{2} (2.64 sq mi)
- Elevation: 167 m (548 ft)

Population (2025)
  - Total: 295
- Time zone: UTC+1 (CET)
  - Summer (DST): UTC+2 (CEST)
- Postal code: 761 4
- Area code: +421 56
- Vehicle registration plate (until 2022): TV
- Website: www.luhyna.sk

Luhyňa (Slovak pronunciation: [ˈluɦiɲa]; Hungarian: Legenye) is a village and municipality in the Trebišov District in the Košice Region of south-eastern Slovakia.

== History ==
In historical records the village was first mentioned in 1263.

== Geography ==
The municipality lies at an altitude of 167 metres (548 ft) and covers an area of 6.83 km^{2} (2.64 sq mi) (2025).

== Population ==
Population statistic (10 years)
Year	1995	2005	2015	2025
Count	347	318	320	295
Difference		−8.35%	+0.62%	−7.81%

Population statistic
Year	2024	2025
Count	294	295
Difference		+0.34%

It has a population of 295 people (31 December 2025).

=== Ethnicity ===
Census 2021 (1+ %)
Ethnicity	Number	Fraction
Slovak	294	95.14%
Not found out	15	4.85%
Hungarian	8	2.58%
Total	309	

In year 2021 was 309 people by ethnicity 294 as Slovak, 15 as Not found out, 8 as Hungarian, 1 as Czech and 1 as German.

Note on population: The difference values of population numbers in the table "Population statistic" and in the sections "Ethnicity" & "Religion" is caused by the use of various statistical methods.

=== Religion ===
Census 2021 (1+ %)
Religion	Number	Fraction
Roman Catholic Church	164	53.07%
Greek Catholic Church	59	19.09%
Not found out	28	9.06%
None	25	8.09%
Calvinist Church	20	6.47%
Eastern Orthodox Church	5	1.62%
Evangelical Church	4	1.29%
Total	309	

In year 2021 was 309 people by religion 164 from Roman Catholic Church, 59 from Greek Catholic Church, 28 from Not found out, 25 from None, 20 from Calvinist Church, 5 from Eastern Orthodox Church, 4 from Evangelical Church, 2 from Ad hoc movements, 1 from Jehovah's Witnesses and 1 from Other.

== Facilities ==
The village has a public library and a football pitch.
