= Zemplínske Hradište =

Village and municipality in Slovakia

Zemplínske Hradište Hardicsa
- Municipality
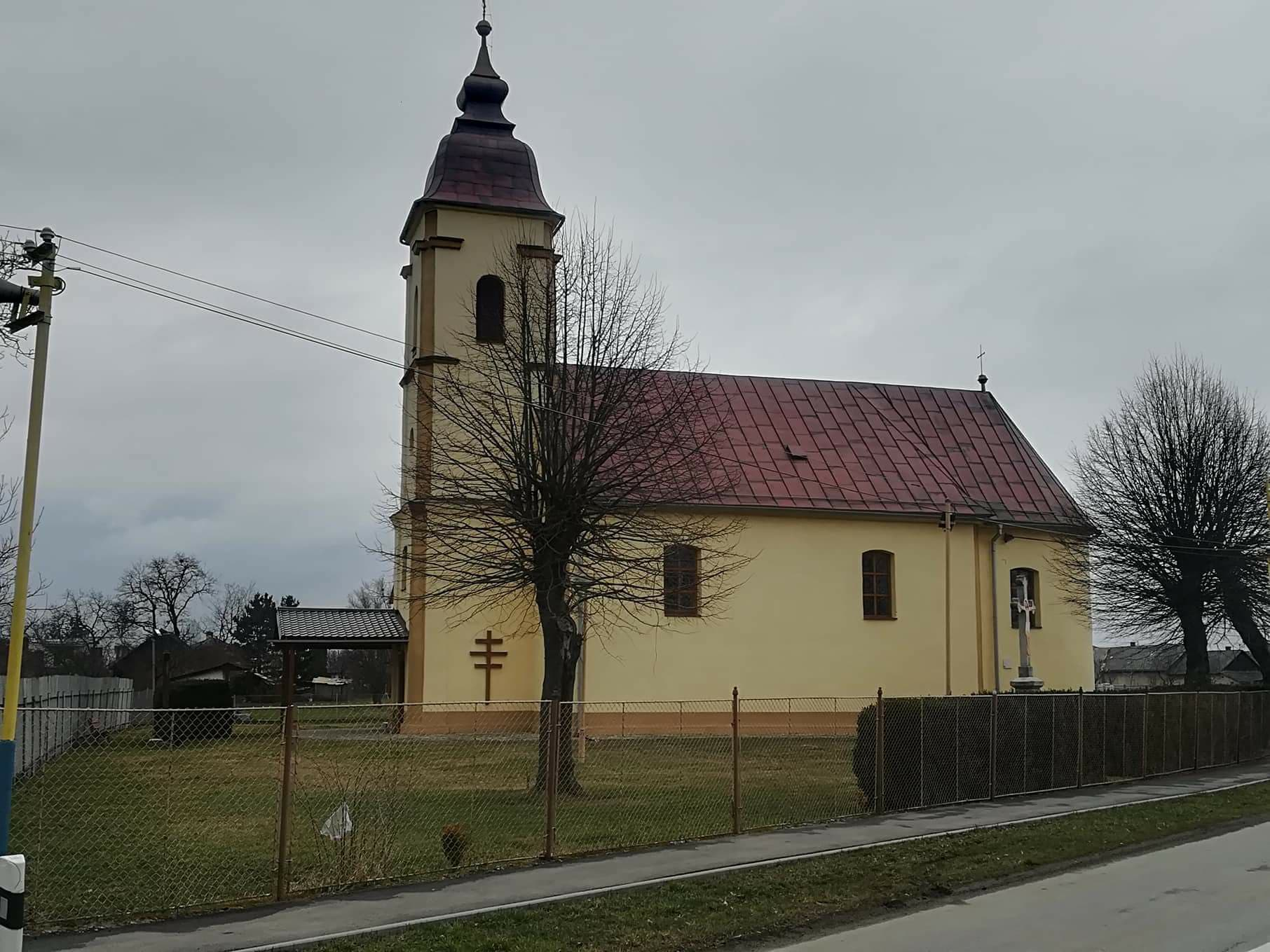

- Flag

- Location of Zemplínske Hradište in the Košice Region Location of Zemplínske Hradište in Slovakia
- Coordinates: 48.58°N 21.73°E
- Country: Slovakia
- Region: Košice Region
- District: Trebišov District
- First mentioned: 1454

Area
  - Total: 20.16 km^{2} (7.78 sq mi)
- Elevation: 103 m (338 ft)

Population (2025)
  - Total: 1,090
- Time zone: UTC+1 (CET)
  - Summer (DST): UTC+2 (CEST)
- Postal code: 760 1
- Area code: +421 56
- Vehicle registration plate (until 2022): TV
- Website: www.zemplinskehradiste.sk

Zemplínske Hradište (Hungarian: Hardicsa) is a village and municipality in the Trebišov District in the Košice Region of south-eastern Slovakia.

== History ==
In historical records the village was first mentioned in 1328. It was a majority Hungarian village until after 1920 when the town became part of the newly created Czechoslovakia. In the 1940s (after WWII) Hungarians were forced to leave, (forcibly expelled) and Slovaks were given free homes to occupy. Those who did not leave became assimilated and now consider themselves to be Slovaks.

== Geography ==
The municipality lies at an altitude of 103 metres (338 ft) and covers an area of 20.16 km^{2} (7.78 sq mi) (2025).

== Population ==
Population statistic (10 years)
| Year | 1995 | 2005 | 2015 | 2025 |
|---|---|---|---|---|
| Count | 1153 | 1138 | 1130 | 1090 |
| Difference | | −1.30% | −0.70% | −3.53% |

Population statistic
| Year | 2024 | 2025 |
|---|---|---|
| Count | 1084 | 1090 |
| Difference | | +0.55% |

It has a population of 1090 people (31 December 2025).

=== Ethnicity ===
Census 2021 (1+ %)
| Ethnicity | Number | Fraction |
|---|---|---|
| Slovak | 1064 | 94.32% |
| Hungarian | 53 | 4.69% |
| Not found out | 32 | 2.83% |
| Total | 1128 | |

In year 2021 was 1128 people by ethnicity 1064 as Slovak, 53 as Hungarian, 32 as Not found out, 9 as Czech, 8 as Romani, 7 as Rusyn, 3 as Ukrainian, 3 as Other, 2 as English and 1 as Austrian.

Note on population: The difference values of population numbers in the table "Population statistic" and in the sections "Ethnicity" & "Religion" is caused by the use of various statistical methods.

=== Religion ===
Census 2021 (1+ %)
| Religion | Number | Fraction |
|---|---|---|
| Calvinist Church | 302 | 26.77% |
| Roman Catholic Church | 206 | 18.26% |
| Greek Catholic Church | 193 | 17.11% |
| Jehovah's Witnesses | 126 | 11.17% |
| None | 126 | 11.17% |
| Eastern Orthodox Church | 102 | 9.04% |
| Not found out | 36 | 3.19% |
| Evangelical Church | 26 | 2.3% |
| Total | 1128 | |

In year 2021 was 1128 people by religion 302 from Calvinist Church, 206 from Roman Catholic Church, 193 from Greek Catholic Church, 126 from Jehovah's Witnesses, 126 from None, 102 from Eastern Orthodox Church, 36 from Not found out, 26 from Evangelical Church, 3 from Other and not ascertained christian church, 2 from Other, 1 from Christian Congregations in Slovakia, 1 from Islam, 1 from Seventh-day Adventist Church, 1 from Buddhism, 1 from Apostolic Church and 1 from Ad hoc movements.

== Facilities ==
The village has a public library, a gym and a football pitch.
