= Kysta =

Village in Trebišov, Košice, Slovakia

Kysta Kiszte
- Municipality
- Flag

- Location of Kysta in the Košice Region Location of Kysta in Slovakia
- Coordinates: 48.52°N 21.72°E
- Country: Slovakia
- Region: Košice Region
- District: Trebišov District
- First mentioned: 1272

Area
  - Total: 8.15 km^{2} (3.15 sq mi)
- Elevation: 130 m (430 ft)

Population (2025)
  - Total: 398
- Time zone: UTC+1 (CET)
  - Summer (DST): UTC+2 (CEST)
- Postal code: 760 2
- Area code: +421 56
- Vehicle registration plate (until 2022): TV
- Website: kysta.sk

Kysta (Hungarian: Kiszte) is a village and municipality in the Trebišov District in the Košice Region of eastern Slovakia.

== History ==
In historical records the village was first mentioned in 1272.

== Geography ==
The municipality lies at an altitude of 130 metres (430 ft) and covers an area of 8.15 km^{2} (3.15 sq mi) (2025).

== Population ==
Population statistic (10 years)
Year	1995	2005	2015	2025
Count	398	391	367	398
Difference		−1.75%	−6.13%	+8.44%

Population statistic
Year	2024	2025
Count	402	398
Difference		−0.99%

It has a population of 398 people (31 December 2025).

=== Ethnicity ===
Census 2021 (1+ %)
Ethnicity	Number	Fraction
Slovak	367	94.58%
Romani	14	3.6%
Not found out	9	2.31%
Hungarian	8	2.06%
Total	388	

In year 2021 was 388 people by ethnicity 367 as Slovak, 14 as Romani, 9 as Not found out, 8 as Hungarian, 1 as German and 1 as Other.

Note on population: The difference values of population numbers in the table "Population statistic" and in the sections "Ethnicity" & "Religion" is caused by the use of various statistical methods.

=== Religion ===
Census 2021 (1+ %)
Religion	Number	Fraction
Roman Catholic Church	162	41.75%
Greek Catholic Church	108	27.84%
Calvinist Church	61	15.72%
None	24	6.19%
Eastern Orthodox Church	10	2.58%
Evangelical Church	10	2.58%
Not found out	6	1.55%
Total	388	

In year 2021 was 388 people by religion 162 from Roman Catholic Church, 108 from Greek Catholic Church, 61 from Calvinist Church, 24 from None, 10 from Eastern Orthodox Church, 10 from Evangelical Church, 6 from Not found out, 3 from Other and not ascertained christian church, 2 from Ad hoc movements, 1 from Jehovah's Witnesses and 1 from Other.

== Facilities ==
The village has a public library and a football pitch.
