= Svinice =

Svinice Szinyér
- Municipality
- Flag

- Location of Svinice in the Košice Region Location of Svinice in Slovakia
- Coordinates: 48.47°N 21.88°E
- Country: Slovakia
- Region: Košice Region
- District: Trebišov District
- First mentioned: 1311

Area
  - Total: 5.25 km^{2} (2.03 sq mi)
- Elevation: 100 m (330 ft)

Population (2025)
  - Total: 220
- Time zone: UTC+1 (CET)
  - Summer (DST): UTC+2 (CEST)
- Postal code: 763 7
- Area code: +421 56
- Vehicle registration plate (until 2022): TV

Svinice (Hungarian: Szinyér) is a village and municipality in the Trebišov District in the Košice Region of south-eastern Slovakia.

== History ==
In historical records the village was first mentioned in 1311.

== Geography ==
The municipality lies at an altitude of 100 metres (330 ft) and covers an area of 5.25 km^{2} (2.03 sq mi) (2025).

== Population ==
Population statistic (10 years)
Year	1995	2005	2015	2025
Count	234	239	224	220
Difference		+2.13%	−6.27%	−1.78%

Population statistic
Year	2024	2025
Count	219	220
Difference		+0.45%

It has a population of 220 people (31 December 2025).

=== Ethnicity ===
Census 2021 (1+ %)
Ethnicity	Number	Fraction
Hungarian	195	90.27%
Slovak	35	16.2%
Total	216	

In year 2021 was 216 people by ethnicity 195 as Hungarian, 35 as Slovak and 2 as Not found out.

Note on population: The difference values of population numbers in the table "Population statistic" and in the sections "Ethnicity" & "Religion" is caused by the use of various statistical methods.

=== Religion ===
Census 2021 (1+ %)
Religion	Number	Fraction
Roman Catholic Church	115	53.24%
Calvinist Church	38	17.59%
Greek Catholic Church	30	13.89%
None	29	13.43%
Total	216	

In year 2021 was 216 people by religion 115 from Roman Catholic Church, 38 from Calvinist Church, 30 from Greek Catholic Church, 29 from None, 2 from Jehovah's Witnesses and 2 from Evangelical Church.

== Facilities ==
The village has a public library and a football pitch.
