= Brezina, Slovakia =

Municipality in Slovakia

Brezina Kolbása
- Municipality
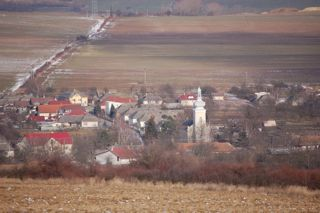

- Flag

- Location of Brezina in the Košice Region Location of Brezina in Slovakia
- Coordinates: 48°33′00″N 21°33′12″E
- Country: Slovakia
- Region: Košice Region
- District: Trebišov District
- First mentioned: 1300

Area
  - Total: 12.96 km^{2} (5.00 sq mi)
- Elevation: 179 m (587 ft)

Population (2025)
  - Total: 662
- Time zone: UTC+1 (CET)
  - Summer (DST): UTC+2 (CEST)
- Postal code: 761 2
- Area code: +421 56
- Vehicle registration plate (until 2022): TV
- Website: www.obecbrezina.sk

Brezina (Hungarian: Kolbása) is a village and municipality in the Trebišov District in the Košice Region of eastern Slovakia.

== History ==
In historical records the village was first mentioned in 1300.

== Geography ==
The municipality lies at an altitude of 179 metres (587 ft) and covers an area of 12.96 km^{2} (5.00 sq mi) (2025).

== Population ==
Population statistic (10 years)
Year	1995	2005	2015	2025
Count	671	707	686	662
Difference		+5.36%	−2.97%	−3.49%

Population statistic
Year	2024	2025
Count	649	662
Difference		+2.00%

It has a population of 662 people (31 December 2025).

Development of the population from 1850 to present

=== Ethnicity ===
Census 2021 (1+ %)
Ethnicity	Number	Fraction
Slovak	635	97.24%
Not found out	10	1.53%
Total	653	

In year 2021 was 653 people by ethnicity 635 as Slovak, 10 as Not found out, 5 as Czech, 5 as Romani, 5 as Rusyn, 1 as Polish, 1 as Hungarian, 1 as Other and 1 as English.

Note on population: The difference values of population numbers in the table "Population statistic" and in the sections "Ethnicity" & "Religion" is caused by the use of various statistical methods.

=== Religion ===
Census 2021 (1+ %)
Religion	Number	Fraction
Greek Catholic Church	365	55.9%
Roman Catholic Church	139	21.29%
Eastern Orthodox Church	57	8.73%
Calvinist Church	34	5.21%
None	34	5.21%
Not found out	12	1.84%
Total	653	

In year 2021 was 653 people by religion 365 from Greek Catholic Church, 139 from Roman Catholic Church, 57 from Eastern Orthodox Church, 34 from Calvinist Church, 34 from None, 12 from Not found out, 6 from Jehovah's Witnesses, 4 from Evangelical Church, 1 from Islam and 1 from Apostolic Church.

== Facilities ==
The village has a public library and a football pitch.

== Genealogical resources ==
The records for genealogical research are available at the state archive "Statny Archiv in Kosice, Slovakia"

- Roman Catholic church records (births/marriages/deaths): 1774-1900 (parish B)
- Greek Catholic church records (births/marriages/deaths): 1826-1897 (parish A)
- Reformated church records (births/marriages/deaths): 1773-1897 (parish A)

== See also ==
- List of municipalities and towns in Slovakia
