= Trnávka, Trebišov District =

Trnávka Tarnóka
- Municipality
- Flag

- Location of Trnávka in the Košice Region Location of Trnávka in Slovakia
- Coordinates: 48.71°N 21.62°E
- Country: Slovakia
- Region: Košice Region
- District: Trebišov District
- First mentioned: 1259

Area
  - Total: 6.01 km^{2} (2.32 sq mi)
- Elevation: 177 m (581 ft)

Population (2025)
  - Total: 179
- Time zone: UTC+1 (CET)
  - Summer (DST): UTC+2 (CEST)
- Postal code: 780 1
- Area code: +421 56
- Vehicle registration plate (until 2022): TV
- Website: www.obectrnavka.eu

Trnávka (Slovak pronunciation: [ˈtr̩naːwka]; Hungarian: Tarnóka) is a village and municipality located in the Trebišov District of the Košice Region of Slovakia.

== History ==
In historical records the village was first mentioned in 1259.

== Geography ==
The municipality lies at an altitude of 177 metres (581 ft) and covers an area of 6.01 km^{2} (2.32 sq mi) (2025).

== Population ==
Population statistic (10 years)
Year	1995	2005	2015	2025
Count	175	162	185	179
Difference		−7.42%	+14.19%	−3.24%

Population statistic
Year	2024	2025
Count	175	179
Difference		+2.28%

It has a population of 179 people (31 December 2025).

=== Ethnicity ===
Census 2021 (1+ %)
Ethnicity	Number	Fraction
Slovak	169	98.25%
Romani	11	6.39%
Not found out	4	2.32%
Total	172	

In year 2021 was 172 people by ethnicity 169 as Slovak, 11 as Romani, 4 as Not found out and 1 as Czech.

Note on population: The difference values of population numbers in the table "Population statistic" and in the sections "Ethnicity" & "Religion" is caused by the use of various statistical methods.

=== Religion ===
Census 2021 (1+ %)
Religion	Number	Fraction
Greek Catholic Church	82	47.67%
Roman Catholic Church	70	40.7%
None	13	7.56%
Not found out	4	2.33%
Evangelical Church	2	1.16%
Total	172	

In year 2021 was 172 people by religion 82 from Greek Catholic Church, 70 from Roman Catholic Church, 13 from None, 4 from Not found out, 2 from Evangelical Church and 1 from Eastern Orthodox Church.
