= Hrčeľ =

Village and municipality in Slovakia

Hrčeľ Gercsely
- Municipality
- Flag

- Location of Hrčeľ in the Košice Region Location of Hrčeľ in Slovakia
- Coordinates: 48.53°N 21.70°E
- Country: Slovakia
- Region: Košice Region
- District: Trebišov District
- First mentioned: 1332

Area
  - Total: 9.98 km^{2} (3.85 sq mi)
- Elevation: 133 m (436 ft)

Population (2025)
  - Total: 1,208
- Time zone: UTC+1 (CET)
  - Summer (DST): UTC+2 (CEST)
- Postal code: 761 5
- Area code: +421 56
- Vehicle registration plate (until 2022): TV
- Website: www.obechrcel.sk

Hrčeľ (Slovak pronunciation: [ˈɦr̩tʂeʎ]; Hungarian: Gercsely) is a village and municipality in the Trebišov District in the Košice Region of south-eastern Slovakia.

== History ==
In historical records the village was first mentioned in 1332.

== Geography ==
The municipality lies at an altitude of 133 metres (436 ft) and covers an area of 9.98 km^{2} (3.85 sq mi) (2025).

== Population ==
Population statistic (10 years)
Year	1995	2005	2015	2025
Count	779	810	1038	1208
Difference		+3.97%	+28.14%	+16.37%

Population statistic
Year	2024	2025
Count	1162	1208
Difference		+3.95%

It has a population of 1208 people (31 December 2025).

=== Ethnicity ===
Census 2021 (1+ %)
Ethnicity	Number	Fraction
Slovak	972	92.39%
Not found out	65	6.17%
Romani	31	2.94%
Total	1052	

In year 2021 was 1052 people by ethnicity 972 as Slovak, 65 as Not found out, 31 as Romani, 3 as Other, 2 as Czech and 2 as English.

Note on population: The difference values of population numbers in the table "Population statistic" and in the sections "Ethnicity" & "Religion" is caused by the use of various statistical methods.

=== Religion ===
Census 2021 (1+ %)
Religion	Number	Fraction
None	390	37.07%
Roman Catholic Church	348	33.08%
Greek Catholic Church	190	18.06%
Not found out	83	7.89%
Calvinist Church	25	2.38%
Evangelical Church	11	1.05%
Total	1052	

In year 2021 was 1052 people by religion 390 from None, 348 from Roman Catholic Church, 190 from Greek Catholic Church, 83 from Not found out, 25 from Calvinist Church, 11 from Evangelical Church, 2 from Other and not ascertained christian church, 2 from Jehovah's Witnesses and 1 from Eastern Orthodox Church.

== Facilities ==
The village has a public library and a football pitch.

== Genealogical resources ==
The records for genealogical research are available at the state archive "Statny Archiv in Kosice, Slovakia"

- Roman Catholic church records (births/marriages/deaths): 1755-1917 (parish B)
- Greek Catholic church records (births/marriages/deaths): 1788-1896 (parish B)
- Reformated church records (births/marriages/deaths): 1759-1910 (parish A)

== See also ==
- List of municipalities and towns in Slovakia
