= Hriadky =

Village and municipality in Slovakia

Hriadky Gerenda
- Municipality
- Flag

- Location of Hriadky in the Košice Region Location of Hriadky in Slovakia
- Coordinates: 48.70°N 21.72°E
- Country: Slovakia
- Region: Košice Region
- District: Trebišov District
- First mentioned: 1320

Area
  - Total: 3.31 km^{2} (1.28 sq mi)
- Elevation: 109 m (358 ft)

Population (2025)
  - Total: 424
- Time zone: UTC+1 (CET)
  - Summer (DST): UTC+2 (CEST)
- Postal code: 762 2
- Area code: +421 56
- Vehicle registration plate (until 2022): TV
- Website: www.obechriadky.sk

Hriadky (Slovak pronunciation: [ˈɦrɪɐtki]; Hungarian: Gerenda) is a village and municipality in the Trebišov District in the Košice Region of south-eastern Slovakia.

== History ==
In historical records the village was first mentioned in 1320.

== Geography ==
The municipality lies at an altitude of 109 metres (358 ft) and covers an area of 3.31 km^{2} (1.28 sq mi) (2025).

== Population ==
Population statistic (10 years)
Year	1995	2005	2015	2025
Count	507	467	462	424
Difference		−7.88%	−1.07%	−8.22%

Population statistic
Year	2024	2025
Count	416	424
Difference		+1.92%

It has a population of 424 people (31 December 2025).

=== Ethnicity ===
Census 2021 (1+ %)
Ethnicity	Number	Fraction
Slovak	410	98.32%
Not found out	5	1.19%
Total	417	

In year 2021 was 417 people by ethnicity 410 as Slovak, 5 as Not found out, 4 as Ukrainian, 2 as Rusyn, 2 as German, 1 as Czech, 1 as Russian, 1 as Polish and 1 as Hungarian.

Note on population: The difference values of population numbers in the table "Population statistic" and in the sections "Ethnicity" & "Religion" is caused by the use of various statistical methods.

=== Religion ===
Census 2021 (1+ %)
Religion	Number	Fraction
Roman Catholic Church	220	52.76%
Greek Catholic Church	123	29.5%
None	36	8.63%
Calvinist Church	9	2.16%
Eastern Orthodox Church	7	1.68%
Apostolic Church	6	1.44%
Total	417	

In year 2021 was 417 people by religion 220 from Roman Catholic Church, 123 from Greek Catholic Church, 36 from None, 9 from Calvinist Church, 7 from Eastern Orthodox Church, 6 from Apostolic Church, 4 from Other, 4 from Evangelical Church, 3 from Not found out, 2 from Jehovah's Witnesses, 1 from Paganism and natural spirituality, 1 from Buddhism and 1 from Ad hoc movements.

== Facilities ==
The village has a public library and a football pitch.

== Genealogical resources ==
The records for genealogical research are available at the state archive "Statny Archiv in Kosice, Slovakia"

- Greek Catholic church records (births/marriages/deaths): 1805-1895 (parish B)
- Reformated church records (births/marriages/deaths): 1749-1905 (parish B)

== See also ==
- List of municipalities and towns in Slovakia
