= Trebišov District =

Coordinates: 48°37′47″N 21°43′11″E

- District
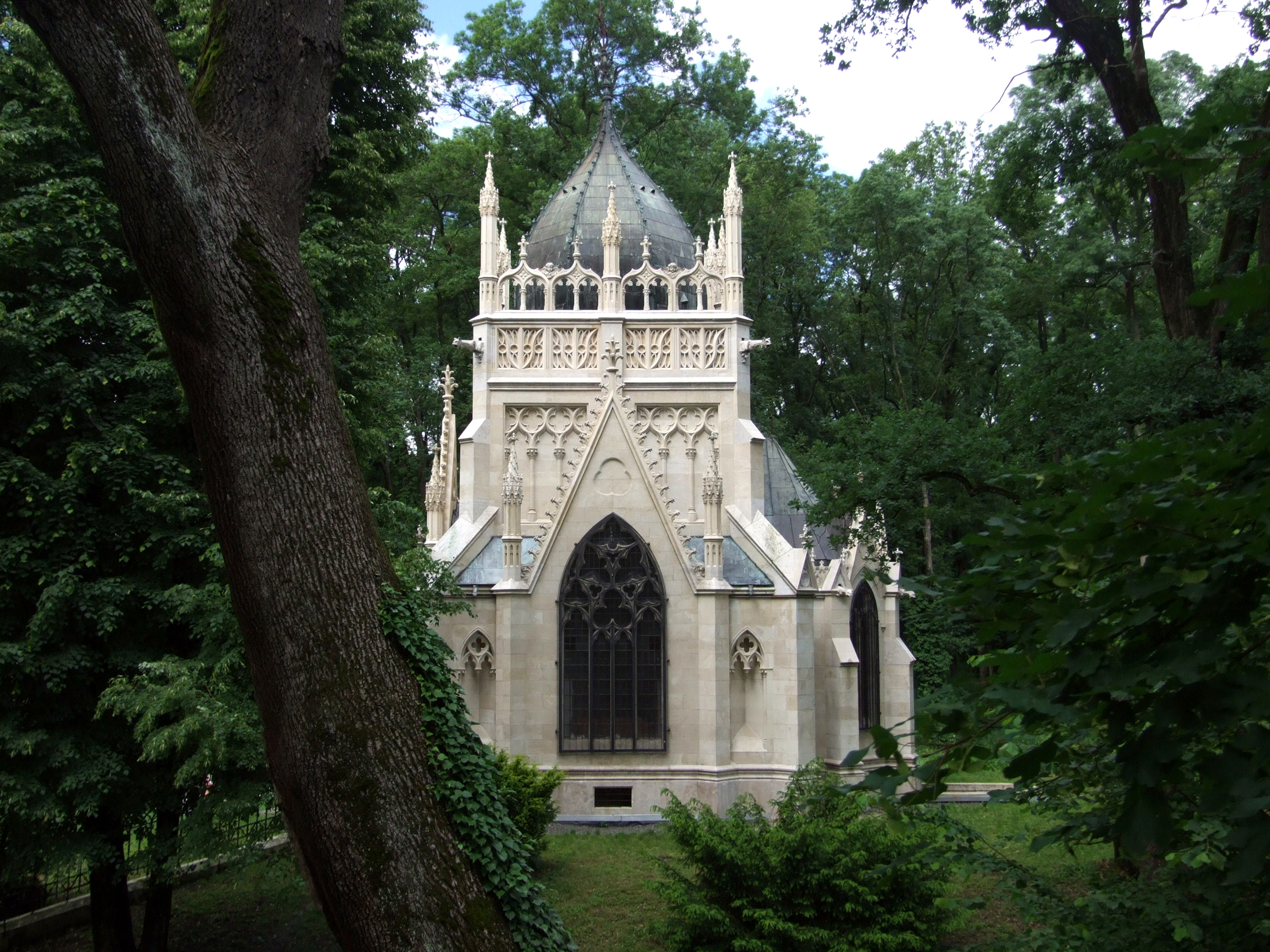
- A picture of Andrássy Mausoleum, which was built in 1893 for Gyula Andrássy and is located in Trebišov, which is in Trebišov District.
- Country: Slovakia
- Region (kraj): Košice Region
- Seat: Trebišov

Area
  - Total: 1,073.45 km^{2} (414.46 sq mi)

Population (2025)
  - Total: 102,677
- Time zone: UTC+1 (CET)
  - Summer (DST): UTC+2 (CEST)
- Telephone prefix: 56
- Vehicle registration plate (until 2022): TV
- Municipalities: 82

Trebišov District (Slovak: okres Trebišov, pronounced [ˈɔkres ˈtrebiʂɔw]; Hungarian: Tőketerebesi járás) is a district in the Košice Region of eastern Slovakia. Until 1918, the district was mostly part of the Hungarian county of Zemplén, apart from a small area in the south-east around Veľké Trakany which formed part of the county of Szabolcs.

== Population ==
Population statistic (10 years)
Year	1995	2005	2015	2025
Count	101,449	104,633	105,862	102,677
Difference		+3.13%	+1.17%	−3.00%

Population statistic
Year	2024	2025
Count	102,907	102,677
Difference		−0.22%

It has a population of 102,677 people (31 December 2025).

Historical population
Year	Pop.	±%
1970	97,436	—
1980	99,346	+2.0%
1991	100,520	+1.2%
2001	103,779	+3.2%
2011	106,072	+2.2%
2021	103,687	−2.2%
Source: Statistical Office of the Slovak Republic

=== Ethnicity ===
Census 2021 (1+ %)
Ethnicity	Number	Fraction
Slovak	71,136	62.07%
Hungarian	26,936	23.5%
Romani	7812	6.81%
Not found out	7159	6.24%
Total	114,602	

In year 2021 was 114,602 people by ethnicity 71,136 as Slovak, 26,936 as Hungarian, 7812 as Romani, 7159 as Not found out, 451 as Czech, 387 as Rusyn, 181 as Ukrainian, 160 as Other, 72 as Russian, 52 as Vietnamese, 52 as German, 30 as Polish, 30 as English, 23 as Italian, 20 as Serbian, 13 as Jewish, 13 as Albanian, 11 as Chinese, 9 as Turkish, 9 as Moravian, 8 as Austrian, 8 as Croatian, 7 as Irish, 5 as Romanian, 5 as French, 4 as Greek, 3 as Canadian, 3 as Bulgarian, 1 as Silesian, 1 as Korean and 1 as Iranian.

Note on population: The difference values of population numbers in the table "Population statistic" and in the sections "Ethnicity" & "Religion" is caused by the use of various statistical methods.

=== Religion ===
Census 2021 (1+ %)
Religion	Number	Fraction
Roman Catholic Church	44,212	42.64%
Greek Catholic Church	20,822	20.08%
None	13,050	12.59%
Calvinist Church	11,515	11.11%
Not found out	7817	7.54%
Eastern Orthodox Church	2534	2.44%
Jehovah's Witnesses	1528	1.47%
Evangelical Church	1198	1.16%
Total	103,687	

In year 2021 was 103,687 people by religion 44,212 from Roman Catholic Church, 20,822 from Greek Catholic Church, 13,050 from None, 11,515 from Calvinist Church, 7817 from Not found out, 2534 from Eastern Orthodox Church, 1528 from Jehovah's Witnesses, 1198 from Evangelical Church, 217 from Other, 176 from Apostolic Church, 142 from Other and not ascertained christian church, 128 from Christian Congregations in Slovakia, 112 from Ad hoc movements, 50 from United Methodist Church, 49 from Islam, 38 from Buddhism, 26 from Seventh-day Adventist Church, 19 from Paganism and natural spirituality, 17 from Old Catholic Church, 16 from Jewish community, 7 from Baptists Church, 6 from Church of the Brethren, 4 from Hinduism, 2 from Church of Jesus Christ of Latter-day Saints, 1 from New Apostolic Church and 1 from Bahá'i Community.

== Municipalities ==
Municipality	Area [km^{2}]	Population
Bačka	9.57	576
Bačkov	27.67	774
Bara	6.25	260
Biel	7.45	1,354
Boľ	12.60	718
Borša	9.54	1,109
Boťany	19.51	1,212
Brehov	7.90	557
Brezina	12.96	662
Byšta	11.52	135
Cejkov	20.84	1,123
Čeľovce	13.26	552
Čerhov	8.52	745
Černochov	6.15	182
Čierna	4.23	427
Čierna nad Tisou	9.37	3,343
Dargov	21.87	629
Dobrá	8.32	505
Dvorianky	6.17	667
Egreš	5.60	476
Hraň	17.40	1,522
Hrčeľ	9.98	1,208
Hriadky	3.31	424
Kašov	8.88	293
Kazimír	9.92	796
Klin nad Bodrogom	3.66	182
Kožuchov	5.86	173
Kráľovský Chlmec	23.80	7,229
Kravany	6.33	375
Kuzmice	13.53	1,746
Kysta	8.15	398
Ladmovce	11.32	304
Lastovce	15.25	1,267
Leles	33.75	1,874
Luhyňa	6.83	295
Malá Tŕňa	9.80	340
Malé Ozorovce	17.08	530
Malé Trakany	11.08	1,084
Malý Horeš	19.20	1,060
Malý Kamenec	5.63	399
Michaľany	8.15	1,736
Nižný Žipov	17.07	1,502
Novosad	15.25	1,038
Nový Ruskov	11.00	688
Parchovany	23.23	2,002
Plechotice	12.93	743
Poľany	18.50	483
Pribeník	12.33	975
Rad	6.78	480
Sečovce	32.65	8,509
Sirník	5.82	548
Slivník	11.30	755
Slovenské Nové Mesto	13.37	1,059
Soľnička	6.15	247
Somotor	16.30	1,377
Stanča	5.49	423
Stankovce	4.40	136
Strážne	16.71	563
Streda nad Bodrogom	22.63	2,231
Svätá Mária	12.94	500
Svätuše	10.15	809
Svinice	5.25	220
Trebišov	70.15	22,706
Trnávka	6.01	179
Veľaty	12.04	811
Veľká Tŕňa	14.11	441
Veľké Ozorovce	13.76	735
Veľké Trakany	10.67	1,525
Veľký Horeš	18.23	1,020
Veľký Kamenec	12.72	688
Viničky	8.84	442
Višňov	4.77	249
Vojčice	17.89	2,273
Vojka	8.73	557
Zatín	21.77	708
Zbehňov	5.03	376
Zemplínska Nová Ves	10.70	939
Zemplínska Teplica	26.81	1,861
Zemplínske Hradište	20.16	1,090
Zemplínske Jastrabie	10.73	643
Zemplínsky Branč	7.25	527
Zemplín	14.66	378

Population and area values are current for year 2025.
