= Veľké Ozorovce =

Village and municipality in Slovakia

Veľké Ozorovce Nagyazar
- Municipality
- Flag

- Location of Veľké Ozorovce in the Košice Region Location of Veľké Ozorovce in Slovakia
- Coordinates: 48.67°N 21.62°E
- Country: Slovakia
- Region: Košice Region
- District: Trebišov District
- First mentioned: 1304

Area
  - Total: 13.76 km^{2} (5.31 sq mi)
- Elevation: 173 m (568 ft)

Population (2025)
  - Total: 735
- Time zone: UTC+1 (CET)
  - Summer (DST): UTC+2 (CEST)
- Postal code: 766 3
- Area code: +421 56
- Vehicle registration plate (until 2022): TV
- Website: www.velkeozorovce.sk

Veľké Ozorovce (Slovak pronunciation: [ˈʋeʎkeː ˈɔzɔrɔwtse]; Hungarian: Nagyazar) is a village and municipality in the Trebišov District in the Košice Region of south-eastern Slovakia.

== History ==
In historical records the village was first mentioned in 1304.

== Geography ==
The municipality lies at an altitude of 173 metres (568 ft) and covers an area of 13.76 km^{2} (5.31 sq mi) (2025).

== Population ==
Population statistic (10 years)
Year	1995	2005	2015	2025
Count	615	736	744	735
Difference		+19.67%	+1.08%	−1.20%

Population statistic
Year	2024	2025
Count	731	735
Difference		+0.54%

It has a population of 735 people (31 December 2025).

=== Ethnicity ===
Census 2021 (1+ %)
Ethnicity	Number	Fraction
Slovak	698	92.81%
Romani	26	3.45%
Not found out	22	2.92%
Total	752	

In year 2021 was 752 people by ethnicity 698 as Slovak, 26 as Romani, 22 as Not found out, 5 as Czech, 3 as Ukrainian, 3 as Rusyn, 3 as Hungarian, 1 as Romanian, 1 as Polish and 1 as Other.

Note on population: The difference values of population numbers in the table "Population statistic" and in the sections "Ethnicity" & "Religion" is caused by the use of various statistical methods.

=== Religion ===
Census 2021 (1+ %)
Religion	Number	Fraction
Roman Catholic Church	541	71.94%
Greek Catholic Church	101	13.43%
None	57	7.58%
Not found out	20	2.66%
Calvinist Church	10	1.33%
Total	752	

In year 2021 was 752 people by religion 541 from Roman Catholic Church, 101 from Greek Catholic Church, 57 from None, 20 from Not found out, 10 from Calvinist Church, 6 from Eastern Orthodox Church, 5 from Jehovah's Witnesses, 5 from Seventh-day Adventist Church, 2 from Other and not ascertained christian church, 2 from Evangelical Church, 2 from Ad hoc movements and 1 from Christian Congregations in Slovakia.

== Facilities ==
The village has a public library.
