= Lastovce =

Lastovce Lasztóc
- Municipality
- Flag

- Location of Lastovce in the Košice Region Location of Lastovce in Slovakia
- Coordinates: 48.55°N 21.63°E
- Country: Slovakia
- Region: Košice Region
- District: Trebišov District
- First mentioned: 1266

Government
  - Mayor: Lukáš Hrinko (Smer-SD)

Area
  - Total: 15.25 km^{2} (5.89 sq mi)
- Elevation: 173 m (568 ft)

Population (2025)
  - Total: 1,267
- Time zone: UTC+1 (CET)
  - Summer (DST): UTC+2 (CEST)
- Postal code: 761 4
- Area code: +421 56
- Vehicle registration plate (until 2022): TV
- Website: www.obeclastovce.sk

Lastovce (Hungarian: Lasztóc) is a village and municipality in the Trebišov District in the Košice Region of eastern Slovakia.

== Geography ==
The municipality lies at an altitude of 173 metres (568 ft) and covers an area of 15.25 km^{2} (5.89 sq mi) (2025).

== Population ==
Population statistic (10 years)
Year	1995	2005	2015	2025
Count	868	1067	1158	1267
Difference		+22.92%	+8.52%	+9.41%

Population statistic
Year	2024	2025
Count	1275	1267
Difference		−0.62%

It has a population of 1267 people (31 December 2025).

=== Ethnicity ===
Census 2021 (1+ %)
Ethnicity	Number	Fraction
Slovak	1182	94.56%
Romani	55	4.4%
Not found out	49	3.92%
Total	1250	

In year 2021 was 1250 people by ethnicity 1182 as Slovak, 55 as Romani, 49 as Not found out, 6 as Czech, 3 as Rusyn, 3 as Hungarian, 3 as Other, 2 as English and 1 as Ukrainian.

Note on population: The difference values of population numbers in the table "Population statistic" and in the sections "Ethnicity" & "Religion" is caused by the use of various statistical methods.

=== Religion ===
Census 2021 (1+ %)
Religion	Number	Fraction
Roman Catholic Church	856	68.48%
Greek Catholic Church	212	16.96%
None	79	6.32%
Not found out	41	3.28%
Calvinist Church	34	2.72%
Evangelical Church	15	1.2%
Total	1250	

In year 2021 was 1250 people by religion 856 from Roman Catholic Church, 212 from Greek Catholic Church, 79 from None, 41 from Not found out, 34 from Calvinist Church, 15 from Evangelical Church, 6 from Eastern Orthodox Church, 3 from Jehovah's Witnesses, 2 from Other and not ascertained christian church, 1 from United Methodist Church and 1 from Apostolic Church.
