= Malý Kamenec =

Malý Kamenec Kiskövesd
- Municipality
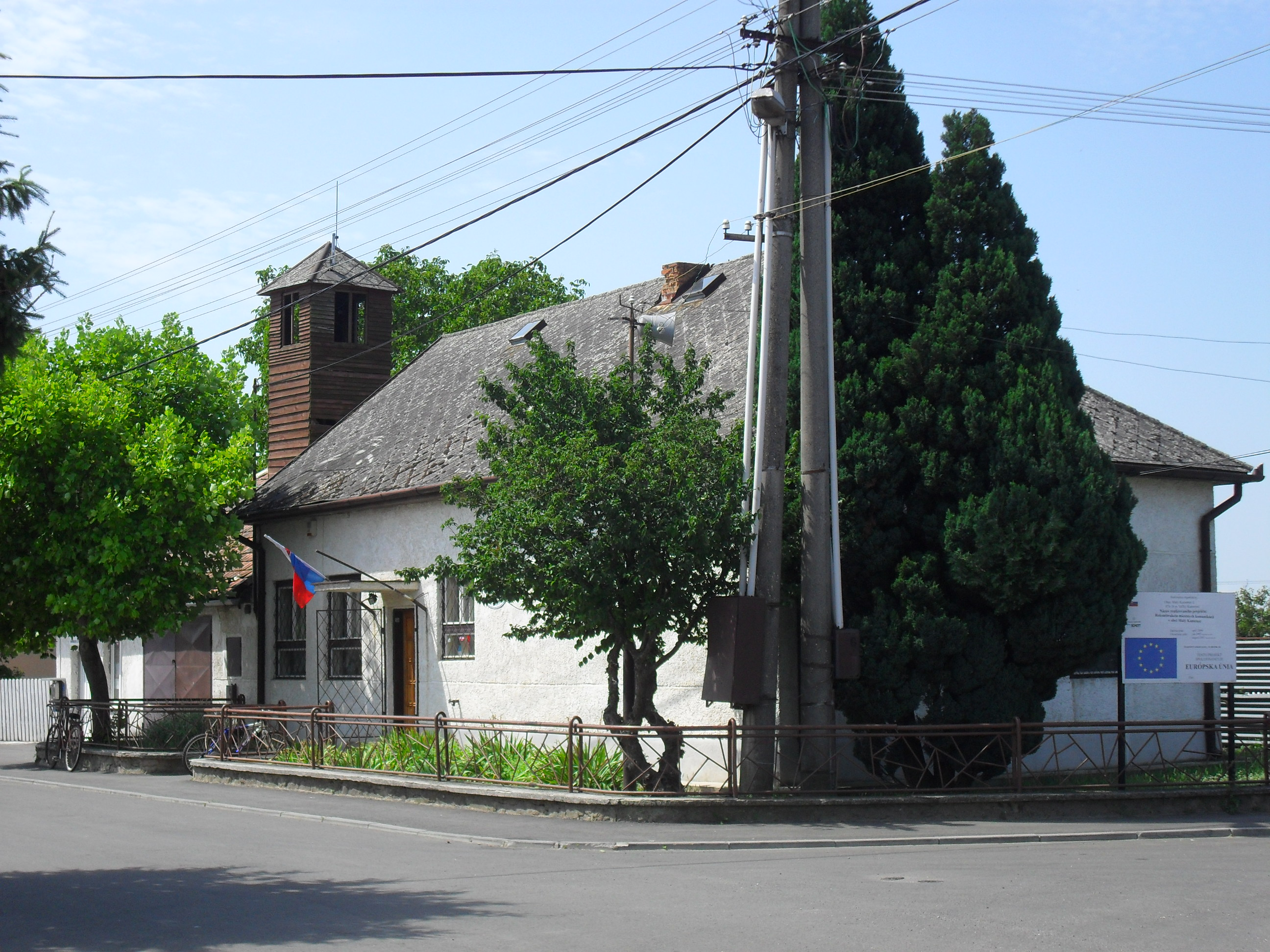

- Location of Malý Kamenec in the Košice Region Location of Malý Kamenec in Slovakia
- Coordinates: 48.35°N 21.80°E
- Country: Slovakia
- Region: Košice Region
- District: Trebišov District
- First mentioned: 1358

Area
  - Total: 5.63 km^{2} (2.17 sq mi)
- Elevation: 98 m (322 ft)

Population (2025)
  - Total: 399
- Time zone: UTC+1 (CET)
  - Summer (DST): UTC+2 (CEST)
- Postal code: 763 6
- Area code: +421 56
- Vehicle registration plate (until 2022): TV
- Website: www.malykamenec.sk

Malý Kamenec (Hungarian: Kiskövesd) is a village and municipality, in the Trebišov District, in the Košice Region of south-eastern Slovakia.

== History ==
In historical records the village was first mentioned in 1358.

== Geography ==
The municipality lies at an altitude of 98 metres (322 ft) and covers an area of 5.63 km^{2} (2.17 sq mi) (2025).

== Population ==
Population statistic (10 years)
Year	1995	2005	2015	2025
Count	479	447	441	399
Difference		−6.68%	−1.34%	−9.52%

Population statistic
Year	2024	2025
Count	410	399
Difference		−2.68%

It has a population of 399 people (31 December 2025).

=== Ethnicity ===
Census 2021 (1+ %)
Ethnicity	Number	Fraction
Hungarian	375	85.61%
Slovak	49	11.18%
Not found out	40	9.13%
Total	438	

In year 2021 was 438 people by ethnicity 375 as Hungarian, 49 as Slovak, 40 as Not found out and 2 as Other.

Note on population: The difference values of population numbers in the table "Population statistic" and in the sections "Ethnicity" & "Religion" is caused by the use of various statistical methods.

=== Religion ===
Census 2021 (1+ %)
Religion	Number	Fraction
Calvinist Church	306	69.86%
Roman Catholic Church	54	12.33%
Not found out	27	6.16%
Greek Catholic Church	19	4.34%
None	14	3.2%
Evangelical Church	9	2.05%
Total	438	

In year 2021 was 438 people by religion 306 from Calvinist Church, 54 from Roman Catholic Church, 27 from Not found out, 19 from Greek Catholic Church, 14 from None, 9 from Evangelical Church, 4 from Paganism and natural spirituality, 4 from Jehovah's Witnesses and 1 from Christian Congregations in Slovakia.

== Facilities ==
The village has a public library and a football pitch.
