= Veľký Kamenec =

Village and municipality in Slovakia

Veľký Kamenec Nagykövesd
- Municipality
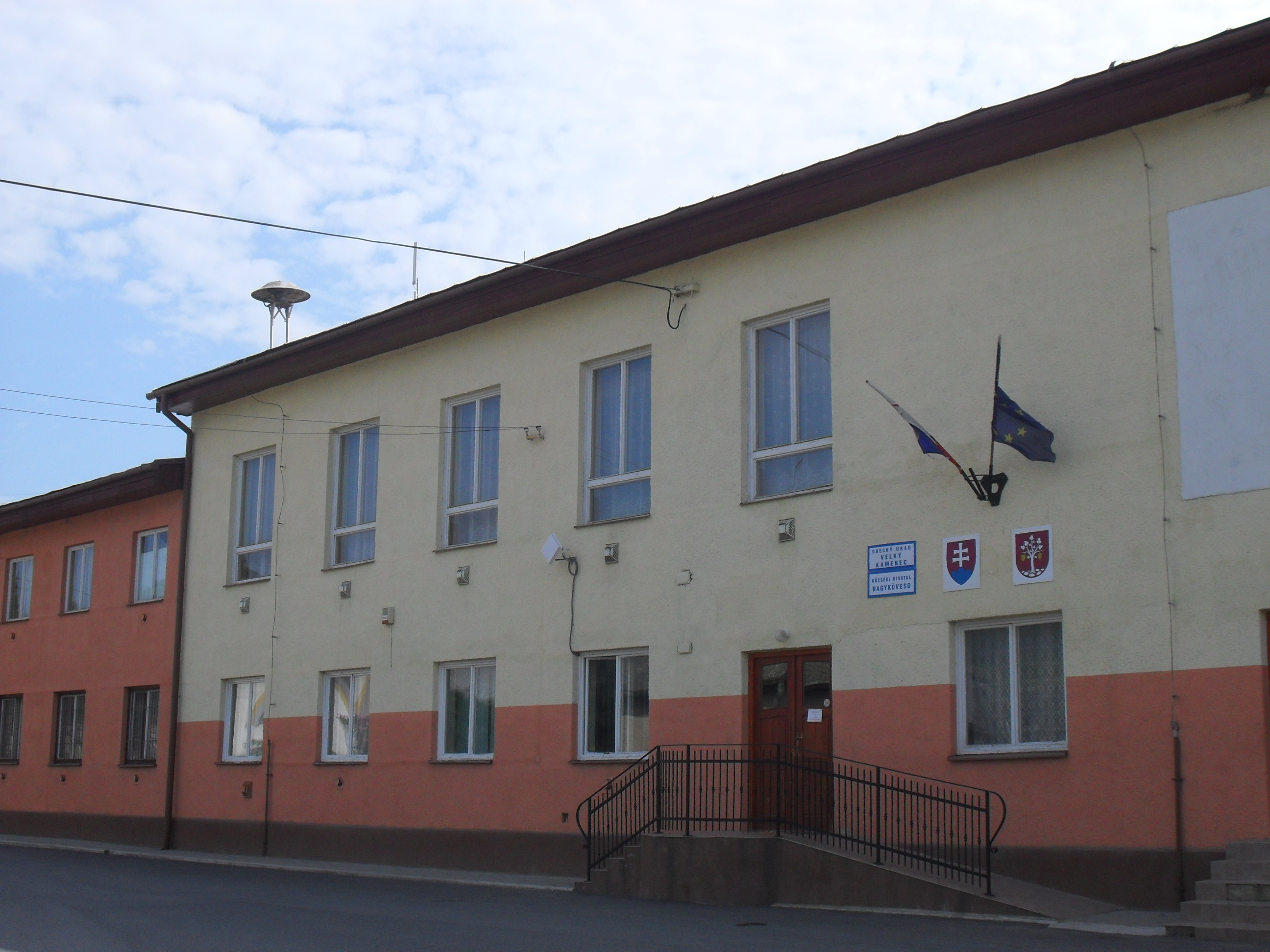

- Flag

- Location of Veľký Kamenec in the Košice Region Location of Veľký Kamenec in Slovakia
- Coordinates: 48.36°N 21.81°E
- Country: Slovakia
- Region: Košice Region
- District: Trebišov District
- First mentioned: 1280

Area
  - Total: 12.72 km^{2} (4.91 sq mi)
- Elevation: 123 m (404 ft)

Population (2025)
  - Total: 688
- Time zone: UTC+1 (CET)
  - Summer (DST): UTC+2 (CEST)
- Postal code: 763 6
- Area code: +421 56
- Vehicle registration plate (until 2022): TV
- Website: velkykamenec.sk

Veľký Kamenec (Hungarian: Nagykövesd) is a village and municipality in the Trebišov District in the Košice Region of south-eastern Slovakia.

== History ==
In historical records the village was first mentioned in 1280.

== Geography ==
The municipality lies at an altitude of 123 metres (404 ft) and covers an area of 12.72 km^{2} (4.91 sq mi) (2025).

== Population ==
Population statistic (10 years)
Year	1995	2005	2015	2025
Count	867	819	790	688
Difference		−5.53%	−3.54%	−12.91%

Population statistic
Year	2024	2025
Count	693	688
Difference		−0.72%

It has a population of 688 people (31 December 2025).

=== Ethnicity ===
Census 2021 (1+ %)
Ethnicity	Number	Fraction
Hungarian	617	83.6%
Slovak	149	20.18%
Not found out	20	2.71%
Total	738	

In year 2021 was 738 people by ethnicity 617 as Hungarian, 149 as Slovak, 20 as Not found out, 5 as Romani, 3 as Other, 1 as Czech and 1 as Rusyn.

Note on population: The difference values of population numbers in the table "Population statistic" and in the sections "Ethnicity" & "Religion" is caused by the use of various statistical methods.

=== Religion ===
Census 2021 (1+ %)
Religion	Number	Fraction
Calvinist Church	347	47.02%
Roman Catholic Church	262	35.5%
None	46	6.23%
Greek Catholic Church	43	5.83%
Evangelical Church	19	2.57%
Not found out	13	1.76%
Total	738	

In year 2021 was 738 people by religion 347 from Calvinist Church, 262 from Roman Catholic Church, 46 from None, 43 from Greek Catholic Church, 19 from Evangelical Church, 13 from Not found out, 7 from Jehovah's Witnesses and 1 from Buddhism.

== Facilities ==
The village has a public library and a football pitch
