= Tokaj wine region =

Wine region in Hungary and Slovakia

- Wine region
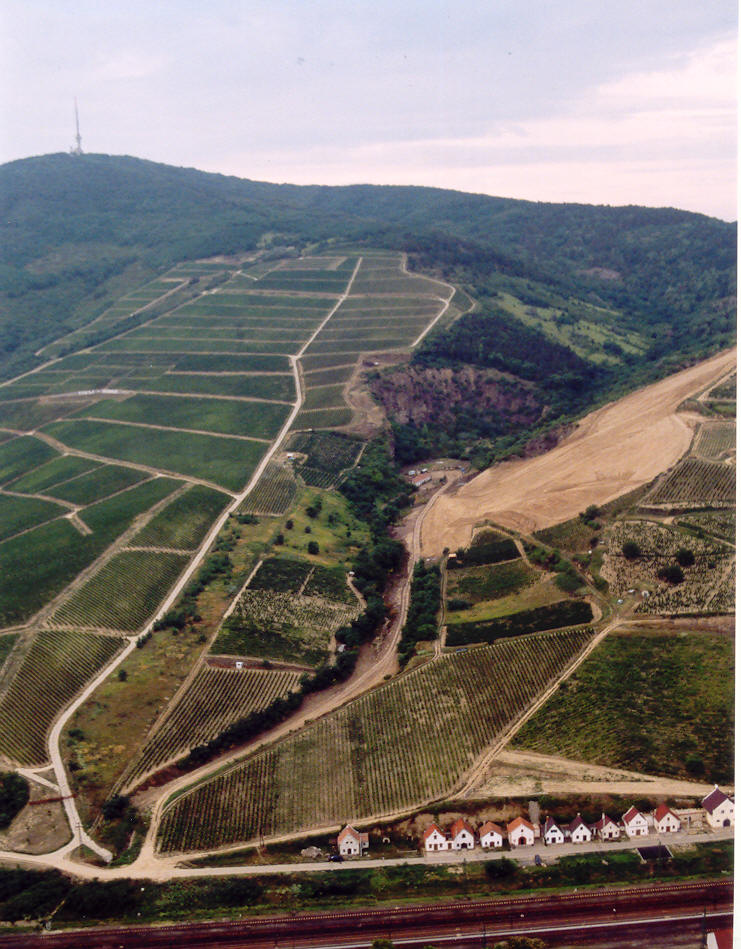
- Official name: Vinohradnícka oblasť Tokaj
- Other names: Tokaj-Hegyalja wine region
- Country: Hungary, Slovakia
- Total area: 11,149 ha
- Size of planted vineyards: 5,500 ha
- Grapes produced: Furmint, Hárslevelű, Yellow Muscat, Zéta, Kövérszőlő, Kabar
- Varietals produced: Tokaji
- Comments
- Location within Hungary

UNESCO World Heritage Site
- Official name: Tokaj Wine Region Historic Cultural Landscape
- Location: Tokaj, Hungary
- Includes: Ungvári, Rákóczi, Koporosi, Gomboshegyi and Oremus Cellars; Tolcsva Wine Museum Cellars
- Criteria: Cultural: (iii), (v)
- Reference: 1063
- Inscription: 2002 (26th Session)
- Area: 13,255 ha (51.18 sq mi)
- Buffer zone: 74,879 ha (289.11 sq mi)
- Coordinates: 48°9′N 21°21′E

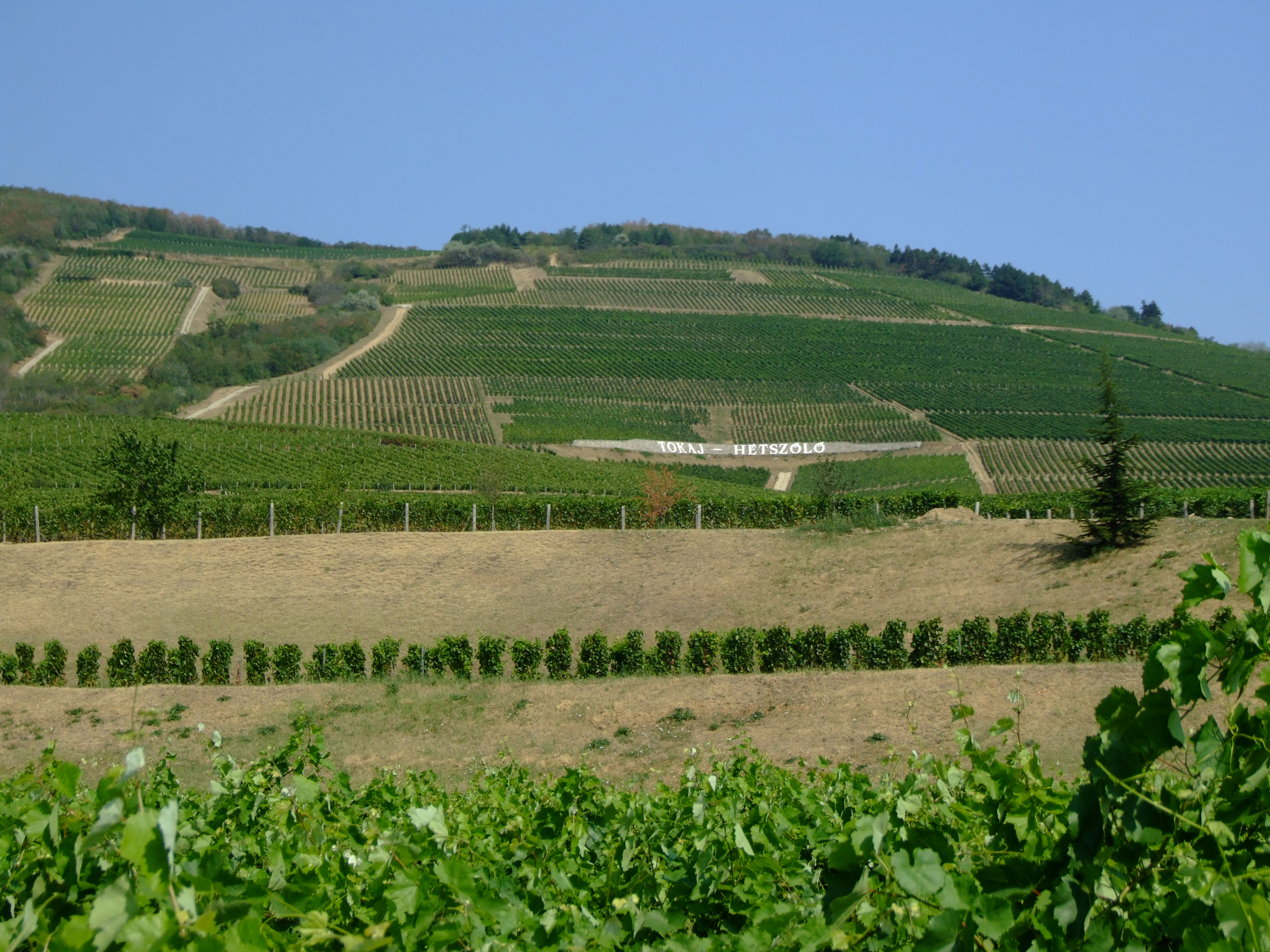

Tokaj wine region (Hungarian: Tokaji borvidék Slovak: Vinohradnícka oblasť Tokaj) or Tokaj-Hegyalja wine region (short Tokaj-Hegyalja or Hegyalja) is a historical wine region located in northeastern Hungary and southeastern Slovakia. It is also one of the seven larger wine regions of Hungary (Hungarian: Tokaji borrégió). Hegyalja means "foothills" in Hungarian, and this was the original name of the region.

The region consists of 28 named villages and 11,149 hectares of classified vineyards, of which an estimated 5,500 are currently planted. Tokaj is particularly famous as the origin of Tokaji aszú wine, the world's oldest botrytized wine. Because of its testimony to a long and unique tradition of viticulture and its cultural importance as a wine-making region, Tokaj was declared a World Heritage Site in 2002 under the name Tokaj Wine Region Historic Cultural Landscape.

Due to the Treaty of Trianon, a smaller part of the historical wine region now belongs to Slovakia.

== Characteristics ==
Tokaj wine region is one of a handful in the world whose conditions are favourable for growing grapes for naturally sweet wines. With its 908 ha, Tokaj is the smallest of the six vine-growing regions of Slovakia. It comprises 7 villages in the Trebišov District: Bara, Čerhov, Černochov, Malá Tŕňa, Slovenské Nové Mesto, Veľká Tŕňa, and Viničky.

Some of the characteristics which make the Tokaj wine region unique are:

- Soil and microclimate: The Tokaj terroir consists of clay or loess soil on volcanic subsoil. The microclimate is determined by the sunny, south-facing slopes and the proximity of the Tisza and Bodrog rivers, and is conducive to the proliferation of Botrytis (noble rot) and the subsequent desiccation of the grapes.
- Indigenous grape varieties: Furmint and Hárslevelű have been cultivated in the region for centuries and, together with Yellow Muscat (Hungarian: Sárgamuskotály), Kabar, Kövérszőlő and Zéta, are the only grape varieties officially permitted for use in the region.
- Cellars: A vast system of cellars was carved out of solid rock between 1400 and 1600 AD. They keep a constant temperature of around 10-12 °C. The cellars are covered with a characteristic mold, which feeds off the alcohol evaporated during aging and provides a constant humidity in the range of 85–95%, which is ideal for the aging of Tokaji wines.
- Appellation system: A royal decree in 1737 or 1757 established a closed production district in Tokaj, supposedly the world's earliest system of wine appellation (though the claim is disputed by Chianti, whose territory was defined in 1716). Vineyard classification began in 1730 and was completed by the national censuses of 1765 and 1772.

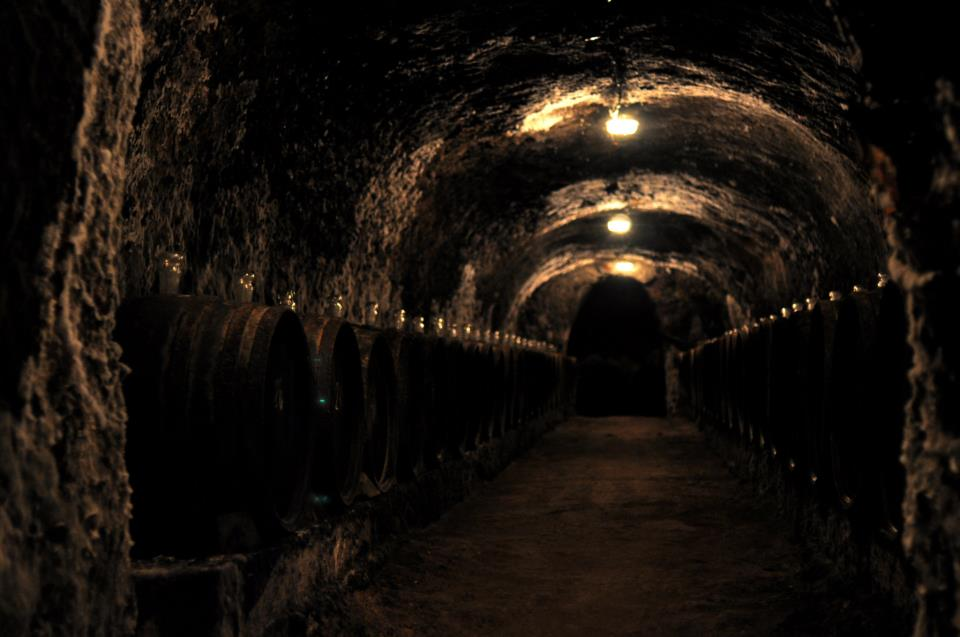
One of many Tokaj wine cellars in Viničky, Slovakia

== History ==
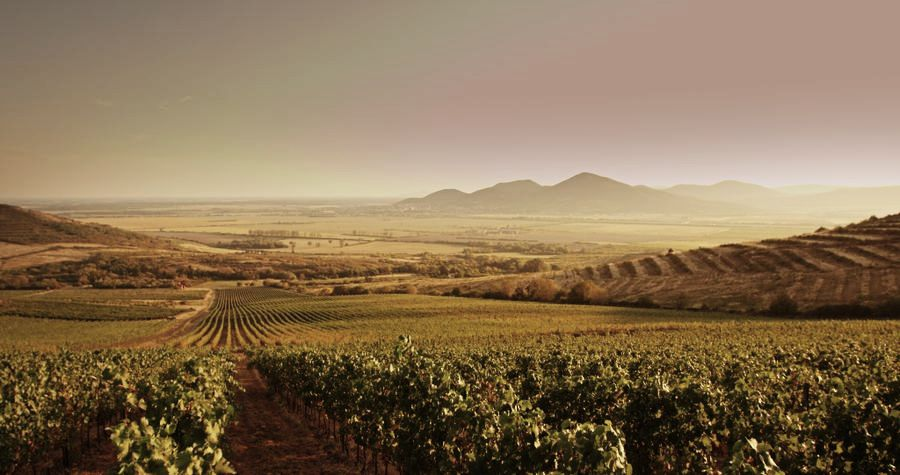
Vineyards in Slovak Tokaj

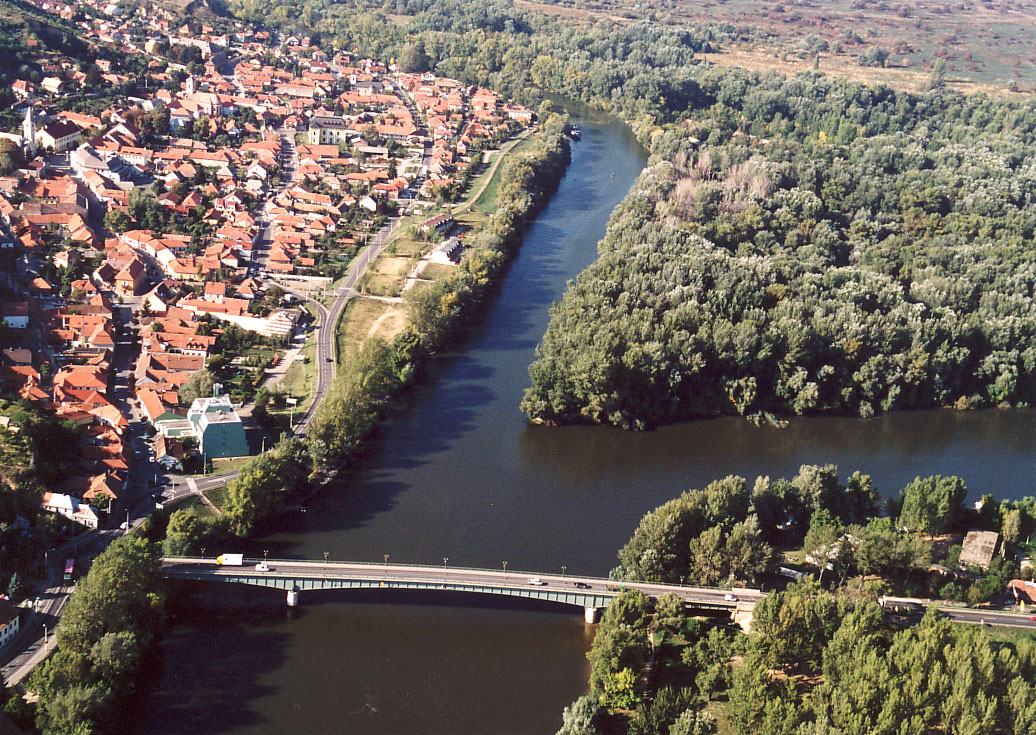
River Tisza and Bodrog at Tokaj from above

Historical records show that vineyards had been established in Tokaj as early as the 12th century, but there is evidence for the earlier introduction of wine production to the region.

A number of experts claim that viticulture could have started amongst in the Tokaj region as early as the 3rd century BC, amongst local Celtic people. Vine growing in the Tokaj region could potentially date back to when parts of the western Carpathian basin were in the Roman province of Pannonia, although the region itself was never occupied by Romans. A petrified grape leaf found in Erdőbénye was dated back to the late 3rd century AD. The vine growing tradition was continued by Slavs. Slavs arrived in the region in the late 5th/early 6th century.

The Hungarians themselves seem to have had an ancient tradition of wine-making, predating their arrival in the Carpathian Basin. Hungarian settlers arrived in Tokaj from the end of the 9th Century and introduced viticultural traditions from the Caucasus and Inner Asia. The Hungarian word for wine itself, bor, traces back to Old Turkic bor. The name “Tokaj” may have derived from the Old Turkic word toqay, meaning “forest by a river” or “riverbank forest”. Another possible origin for the name “Tokaj” is that it is derived from the Slavic word "Stokaj", meaning approximately confluence (in this case, the confluence of the rivers Bodrog and Tisza). Another possible origin for the name is that it comes from an Armenian word meaning "grape".

Legend says that when Hungarians, led by Álmos and his son Árpád, reached this area, viticulture had already been flourishing. Árpád's valiant knight Turzol was first to climb the summit, and on return he reported to his master that the hillside was covered throughout with tranquil vineyards. Árpád then awarded Turzol not only with the hill, but also the entire area up to the intersection of the Bodrog and Tisza rivers. The village of Turzol was built here (today Tarcal). In 1241, the invasion of Tatars left the area plundered and its vineyards destroyed. King Béla IV of Hungary (1235-1270) decided to bring a new life to the region and colonized it by Latin people.

The settlers were probably Walloons from northern France, although some researchers claim that those were Italians. The Slovak village of Bara (Hungarian: Bári) was colonized by Italian settlers who brought with them new wine growing skills and traditions, as well as a base variety Furmint. After the Turkish wars which began in 1528, the region stayed under Turkish rule for 170 years. Most of Tokaj cellars date back to that period, when they were built as hideouts for people and property from the plundering soldiers.

Latin people were first invited to settle in Tokaj by Hungarian King Béla III (1172–1196) and then by Béla IV (1235–1270). These immigrants were probably Walloons from northern France, although some researchers claim that they were Italians. Slavic peoples (Slovaks and Rusyns) are also documented as being involved in Tokaj viticulture by the 12th century. However, the rise of Tokaj as a major wine region can be dated to the early 16th Century.

Around 1620 the Emperor imported a Walloon-French wine-farmer Duvont, who later invented what would be known as the "king of wines"-method in the Tokaji-district. In honour of Mr. Duvont's exceptional skills, the Emperor ennobled this farmer, and gave him one of his many villages (Kiralyfalva), now Königsdorf in Austria. The emperor then named the family Királyfalvy.

Tokaji wine became an increasingly important commodity for the region from the 17th century, its export being a major source of income for the ruling princes of Transylvania to which the Tokaj region belonged at the time. Indeed, revenues from the increasingly renowned Tokaji Aszú wine helped to pay for the wars of independence fought against Austrian Habsburg rule. The repute of Tokaji wine was enhanced when in 1703, Francis II Rákóczi, prince of Transylvania, gave King Louis XIV of France a gift of numerous bottles of wine from his Tokaj estate. Tokaji wine was then served at the Versailles Court, where it became known under the name of Tokay. Delighted with the precious beverage, Louis XIV declared it "Vinum Regum, Rex Vinorum" ("Wine of Kings, King of Wines").

In the 18th Century, Tokaj reached the height of its prosperity. Both Poland and Russia had become major export markets for its wine. Such was the importance of Tokaji in Russia, that the Russian emperors maintained a de facto colony in Tokaj in order to guarantee the supply of wine to the Imperial Court.

The partition of Poland in 1795 and subsequent imposition of customs duties dealt a severe blow to the exports of Tokaji wine and precipitated the economic decline of the region. However, this was only the first of three major crises for Tokaj. The second occurred when the phylloxera epidemic reached Tokaj in 1885 and destroyed the vast majority of the vineyards in a matter of years. The third shock was when Hungary lost two-thirds of its territory under the peace Treaty of Trianon signed in June 1920, and thus Tokaj wine lost access to the majority of its domestic market. The region was also divided between Hungary and the newly created Czechoslovakia, which gained an area of 120 hectares (with the exception of 1938–1944, when Hungary took control over the territory). The latter now forms part of an adjoining wine region in Slovakia with approximately 908 hectares of classified Tokaj vineyards.

The era of communist rule in Hungary saw a deterioration in the quality and reputation of Tokaji wines. However, since 1990 a considerable amount of investment has gone into the Tokaj region, creating what has been dubbed as the "Tokaj Renaissance". There are now almost 600 wineries in the region, of which about 50 produce the full range of wines.

=== Division of Tokaj-Hegyalja ===
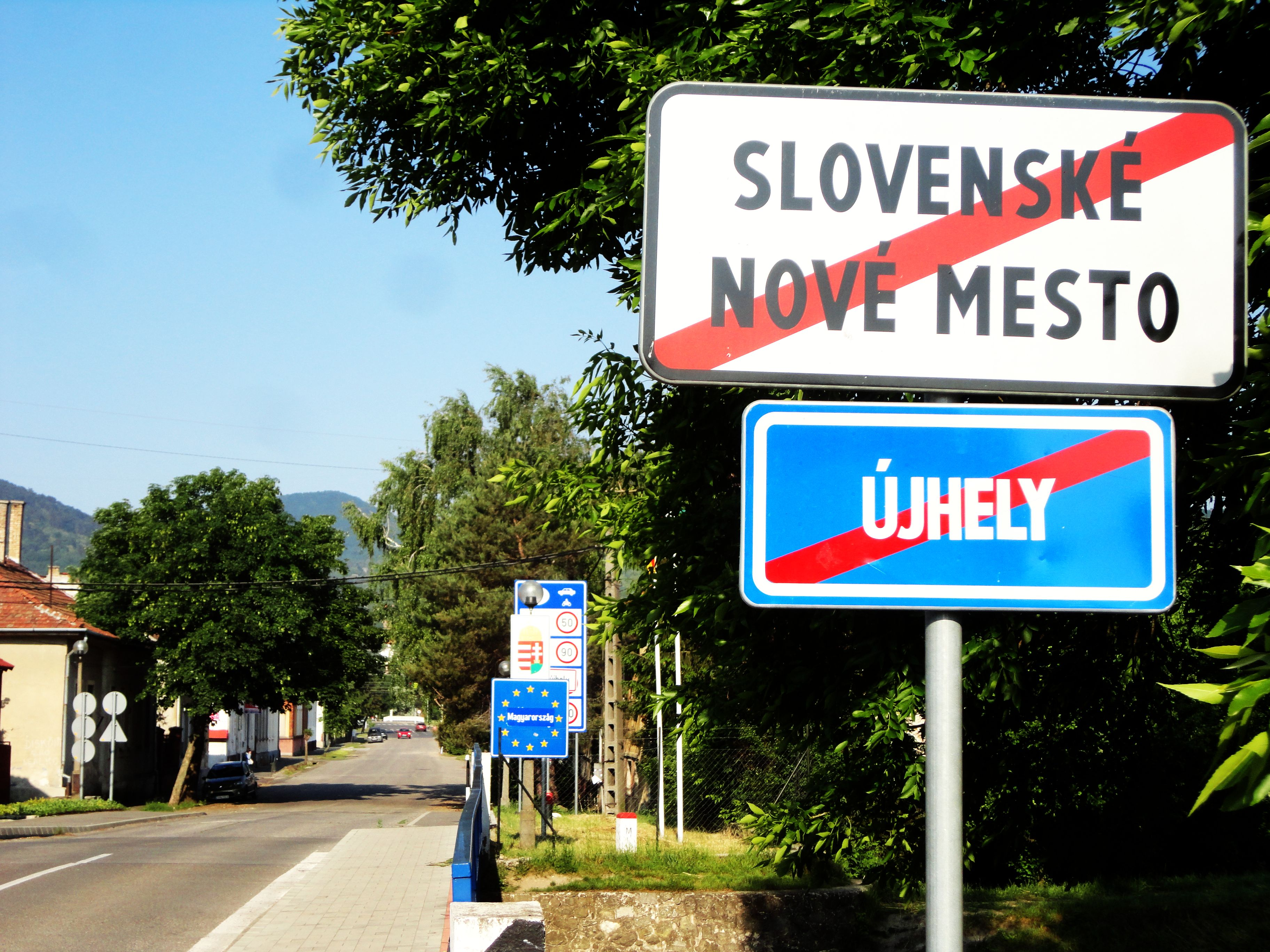
Border crossing between Slovenské Nové Mesto and Sátoraljaújhely

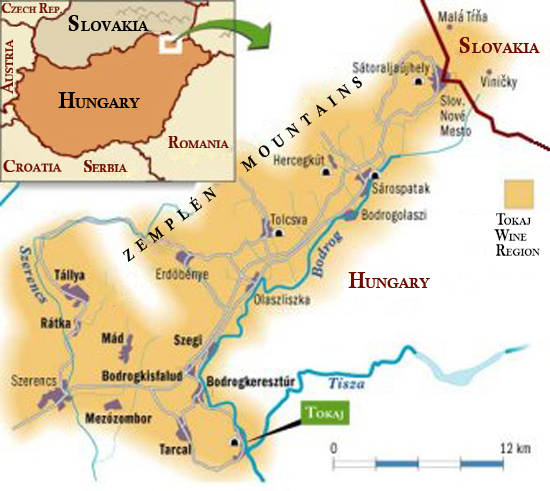
Map of Tokaj wine Region with both Hungarian and Slovak parts

Following the signature of the peace Treaty of Trianon in June 1920, Hungary lost two-thirds of its territory, and the Tokaj wine region was divided between Hungary and the newly created Czechoslovakia. A state border has been set on the Ronyva creek and small suburb of Hungarian town Sátoraljaújhely (Kiskarlapuszta, Nagykarlapuszta, Állomás) was granted to Czechoslovakia (today Slovakia) and became a village called Slovenské Nové Mesto. Out of the historical Tokaj-Hegyalja wine region, Czechoslovakia gained an area of 175 hectares of vineyards and 3 villages: Malá Tŕňa, Slovenské Nové Mesto and Viničky. During the inter-war period, Slovakia's production of Tokaj wine was concentrated in Malá Tŕňa, which has always been the principal wine-growing locale in the area, and the local viticultural school was also located there (with instruction in Hungarian). In 1924, a viticultural research station was built there in order to improve the vinegrowing and winemaking techniques in the region. Following the First Vienna Award in 1938, Hungary gained once again the territory and held it until 1944.

Not much has changed since the partition of the wine region. The majority of local population has been using Hungarian as their first language and they have preserved winemaking as well as other traditions just like before the Treaty of Trianon. The winemakers continued producing Tokaj wines according to the old Hungarian legislation (law of former ministry of agriculture n° XLVII from 17.12.1908). In 1958, the research station in Malá Tŕňa prepared a proposal regarding the future development of the Tokaj wine region in Czechoslovakia. In 1959, the Czechoslovak government passed new legislation and expanded the region by adding 4 more neighboring villages: Veľká Tŕňa, Bara, Čerhov and Černochov. With addition of these new communities, the total surface of classified Tokaj vineyards became 703.10 ha. Another legislation has been passed in 1996, expanding the surface to 908.11 ha of classified Tokaj vineyards.

A detailed map of the Slovak part of the Tokaj wine region has been drawn in 2016 and is visible on multiple tourist information panels on the Slovak side of the appelation.

== Designation of origin dispute ==
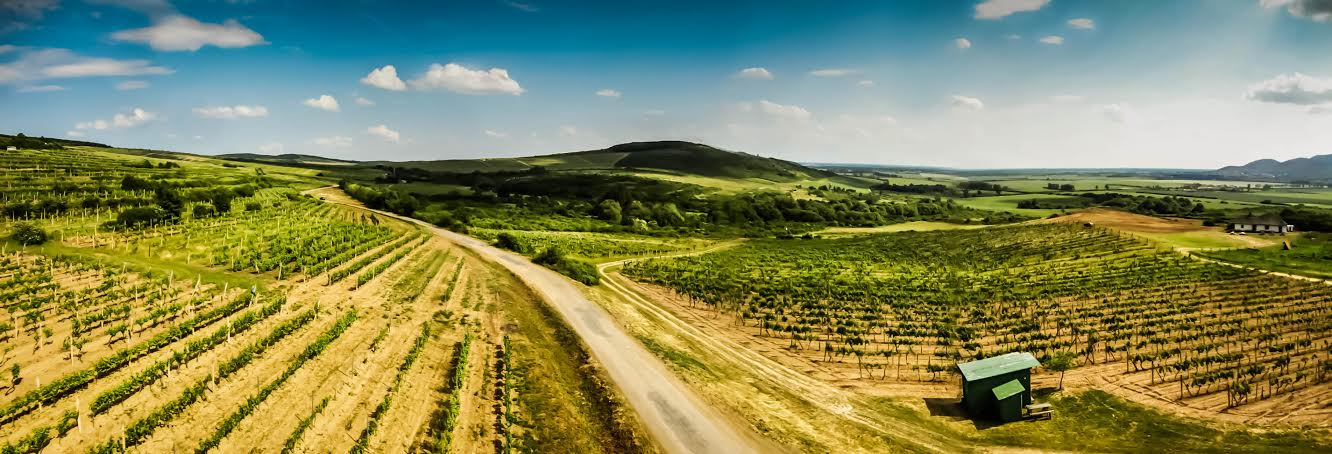
Slovak Tokaj wine region.

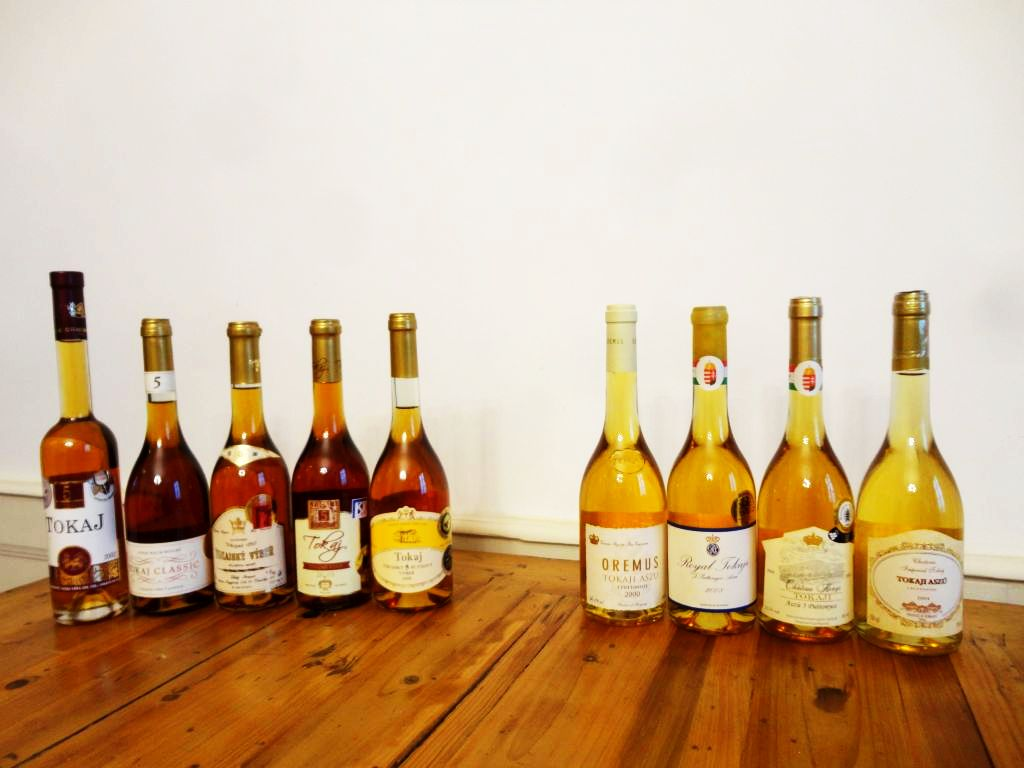
Bottles of Slovak (left) and Hungarian Aszú wines

Tokaj wines have distinctive characteristics and are sold on the international market.

The dispute started in 1964 when, for the first time, the then Czechoslovakia exported its excessive production of Tokaj wine to Austria, the market that used to be solely supplied with this commodity by Hungary. The conflict of interests was settled in a bilateral agreement according to which Slovakia - at the expense of the Czech beer-related concession on Hungarian part - was only allowed to export its overproduction of Tokaj wine to Hungary (which consequently re-labeled and re-exported it). This agreement expired in 1990 after which date the dispute arose again. An agreement was reached in June 2004 between the Hungarian and Slovak governments concerning the use of the Tokaj name in Slovakia. Under this agreement, wine produced on 5.65 km^{2} of land in Slovakia is able to use the Tokaj name. However, the Slovak part did not observe their legally binding undertaking, which was to introduce the same standards enshrined in Hungarian wine laws since 1990. It has not yet been decided who will monitor or enforce those laws. The disputes led Slovakia into an international lawsuit between Hungary and five other countries (Italy, France, Australia, Serbia and Slovenia), for the brand name "Tokaji". (see details: Tokaji)

In November 2012, the European Court ruled against Hungary's request to erase the Slovak entry “Vinohradnícka oblasť Tokaj” from “E-Bacchus”, an electronic database containing a register of designations of origin and geographical indications protected in the EU. Hungary lodged an appeal against the judgement of the General Court. In February 2013, the EU Court of Justice has turned down the Hungarian appeal against an earlier ruling concerning Slovakia's registration of “Vinohradnícka oblasť Tokaj” (Tokaj Wine Region), which contains the name of Hungary's Tokaj region. In its ruling, the court said that Slovakia's registering its “Vinohradnícka oblasť Tokaj” in the European database E-Bacchus did not constitute an actionable measure. As a result, under the current EU legislation the wine-growing region of Tokaj is located in both Hungary and Slovakia. Therefore, wine producers from both the Hungarian Tokaj region and the Slovak Tokaj region may use the Tokaj brand name.

=== Tokaj (Slovakia) ===
The Tokaj wine region is a wine-growing region located in south-eastern Slovakia and north-eastern Hungary. The two vine-growing areas were once part of the greater Tokaj wine region (also Tokaj-Hegyalja wine region or Tokaj-Hegyalja) of the Kingdom of Hungary. Following the Treaty of Trianon, a smaller part (3 villages and about 175 hectares of vineyards) became part of Czechoslovakia, and after 1993, Slovakia. The majority of the region (around 28 communities and some 5,500 hectares of vineyards) remained part of Hungary. Nowadays, the Slovak part of the Tokaj wine region comprises 7 communities and approximately 908 hectares of vineyards. Under the current EU legislation, the vintners in the Slovak wine region of Tokaj may use the Tokaj label (or Tokajský/-á/-é which means 'of Tokaj' in Slovak).

== Winemakers and wine styles ==
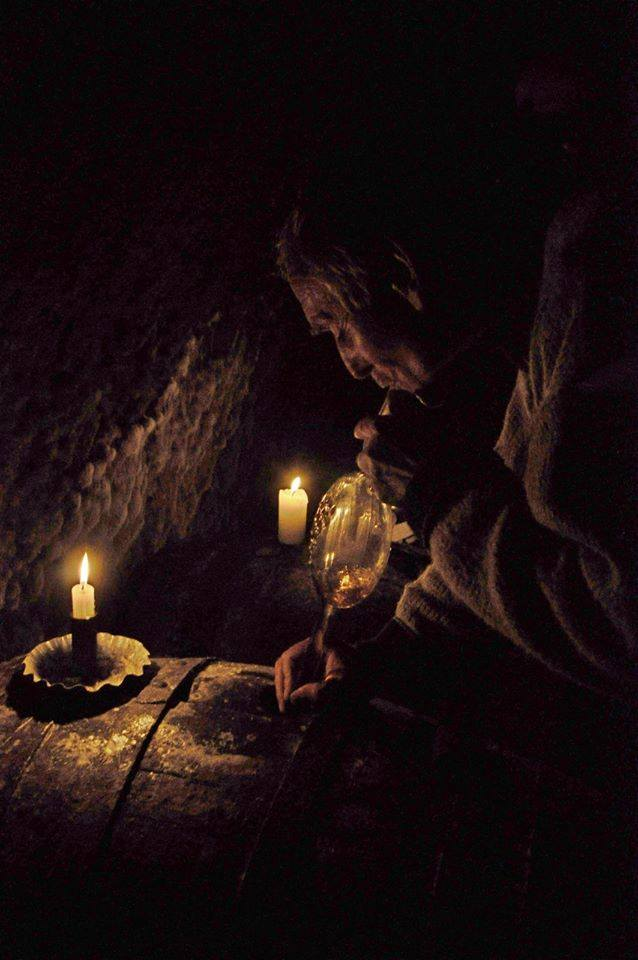
Tokaj winemaker using a wine thief to extract wine from the barrel

Wine makers from the Slovak side of the border produce quality dessert as well as dry wines similar to those of the Hungarian wine region. The Tokaj wines (Slovak: Tokajské víno) made exclusively from 3 base varieties Furmint, Lipovina and Yellow Muscat (Slovak: Muškát žltý) grapes, are:

- Tokajský Furmint
- Tokajská Lipovina
- Tokajský Muškát žltý (Yellow Muscat)
- Tokajské samorodné suché (samorodné derived from a Slovak word meaning "the way it was grown", suché means "dry"): Samorodné wine is set apart from ordinary wine in that it is made from bunches which contain a considerable proportion of botrytised grapes. Because of this, Samorodné is typically higher in extract than ordinary wine.
- Tokajské samorodné sladké (sladké means "sweet")is set apart from ordinary wine in that it is made from bunches which contain a bigger proportion of botrytised grapes.
- Tokajský výber (Hungarian: aszú): This is the wine which made Tokaj world famous. It is a sweet dessert wine made by individually picking botrytised grapes and trampling them in huge vats to form a paste. Must is then poured on the paste and left to soak before the wine is transferred to wooden casks where fermentation in completed. The wines are graded from 3 to 6 putňa (Hungarian: puttony), representing the level of sugar and sugar-free extract in the mature wine.
- Tokajská výberová esencia (the Hungarian version is called aszú-eszencia)
- Tokajská esencia-nektár (meaning "essence-nectar")
- Tokajský mášláš (derived from the Hungarian word máslás)
- Tokajský fordítáš (derived from the Hungarian word fordítás)
