= Sweetness of wine =

Subjective feature of taste of wine

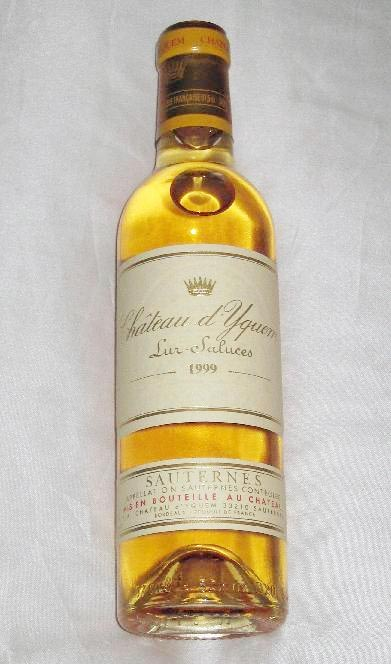
A half bottle of Sauternes from Château d'Yquem, which produces one of the world's most famous and expensive sweet wines

The subjective sweetness of a wine is determined by the interaction of several factors, including the amount of sugar in the wine, but also the relative levels of alcohol, acids, and tannins. Sugars and alcohol enhance a wine's sweetness, while acids cause sourness and bitter tannins cause bitterness. These principles are outlined in the 1987 work by Émile Peynaud, The Taste of Wine.

According to the International Organization of Vine and Wine (OIV), wines can be classified based in their sugar content. A wine is considered dry when it contains no more than 4g/L of glucose plus fructose or when its acidic strength is at least 2g/L relative to glucose plus fructose. Medium dry wines have a sugar content higher than that of dry wines. Mellow or semi-sweet wines contain more sugar than the medium dry wines but no more than 45g/L. Sweet wines contain at least 45g/L of glucose plus fructose.

== History ==
Vintage: The Story of Wine, a book authored by British wine writer Hugh Johnson, presents several methods that have been used throughout history to sweeten wine. The most common way was to harvest the grapes as late as possible. This method was advocated by Virgil and Martial in Roman times. In contrast, the ancient Greeks would harvest the grapes early, to preserve some of their acidity, and then leave them in the sun for a few days to allow them to shrivel and concentrate the sugars. In Crete, a similar effect was achieved by twisting the stalks of the grape to deprive them of sap and letting them dry on the vine—a method that produced passum and the modern Italian equivalent, passito.

Stopping the fermentation also enhanced a wine's potential sweetness. In ancient times, this was achieved by submerging the amphorae in cold water until winter.

Wine can also be sweetened by the addition of sugar in some form, after fermentation is completed – the German method like the Süssreserve. In Roman times, this was done in preparing mulsum, wine freshly sweetened with honey and flavoured with spices, used as an apéritif, and also in the manufacture of conditum, which had similar ingredients but was matured and stored before drinking. It was also common from the Roman era until quite recently to sweeten wine with sugar of lead, a toxic substance that increases the apparent sweetness of wines and other beverages. The practice continued well into the 19th century, although the leading was mostly restricted to very cheap wines after the harmful nature of lead was demonstrated in the 17th century.

== Residual sugar ==
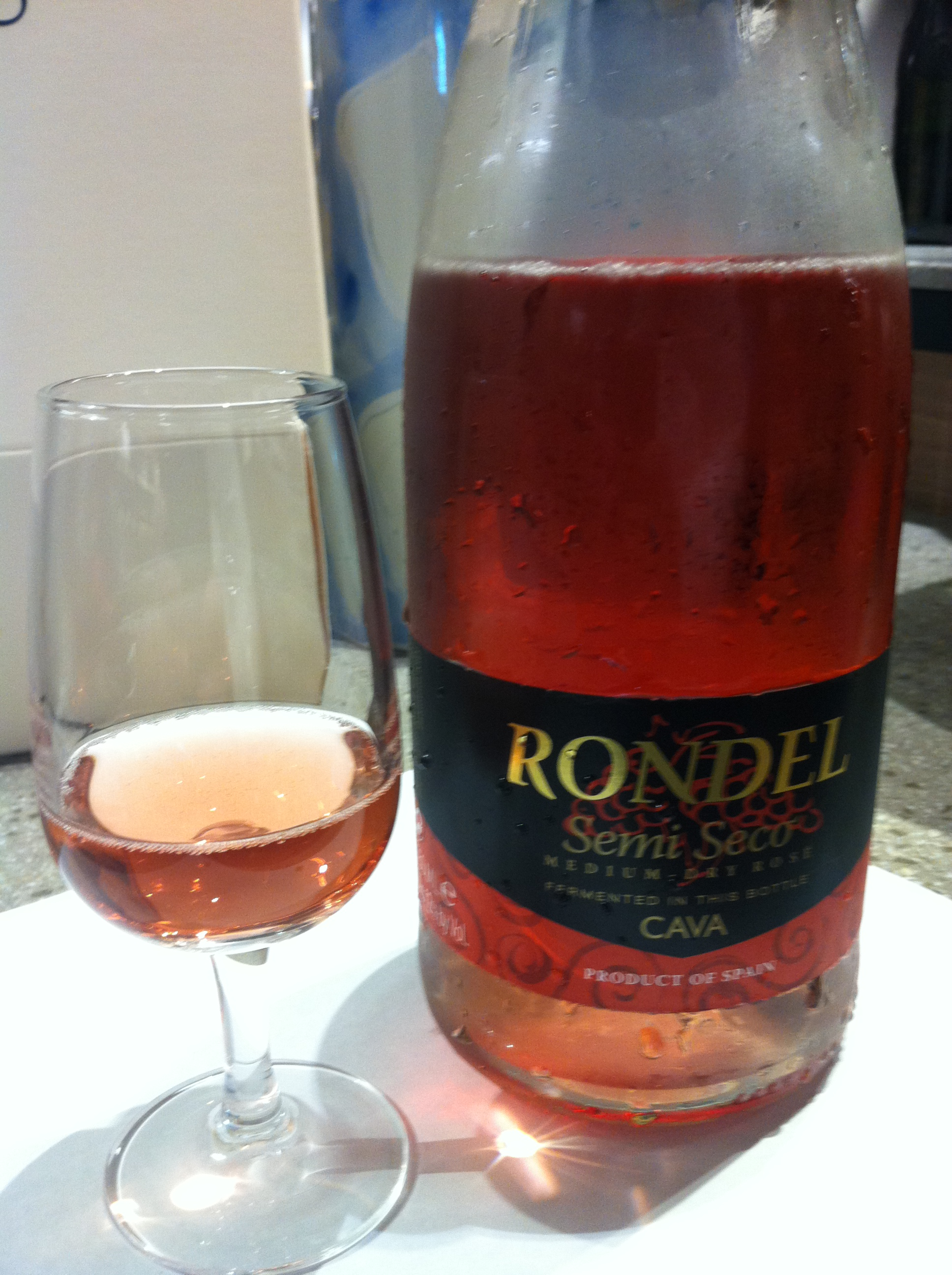
A Spanish sparkling Cava with its sweetness level (semi-seco) listed on the label

Among the components influencing how sweet a wine will taste is residual sugar. It is usually measured in grams of sugar per litre of wine, often abbreviated to g/L. Residual sugar typically refers to the sugar remaining after fermentation stops, or is stopped, but it can also result from the addition of unfermented must (a technique practiced in Germany and known as Süssreserve) or ordinary table sugar.

Even among the driest wines, it is rare to find wines with a level of less than 1 g/L, due to the unfermentability of certain types of sugars, such as pentose. By contrast, any wine with over 45 g/L would be considered sweet, though many of the great sweet wines have levels much higher than this. For example, the great vintages of Château d'Yquem contain between 100 and 150 g/L of residual sugar. The sweetest form of the Tokaji, the Eszencia, contains over 450 g/L, with exceptional vintages registering 900 g/L. Such wines are balanced, keeping them from becoming cloyingly sweet, by carefully developed use of acidity. This means that the finest sweet wines are made with grape varieties that keep their acidity even at very high ripeness levels, such as Riesling and Chenin blanc.

How sweet a wine will taste is also controlled by factors such as the acidity and alcohol levels, the amount of tannin present, and whether the wine is sparkling or not. A sweet wine such as a Vouvray can actually taste dry due to the high level of acidity. A dry wine can taste sweet if the alcohol level is elevated. Medium and sweet wines have a perception among many consumers of being of lower quality than dry wines. However, many of the world's great wines, such as those from Sauternes (including Barsac) or Tokaj, have a high level of residual sugar, which is carefully balanced with additional acidity to produce a harmonious result.

== Süssreserve ==
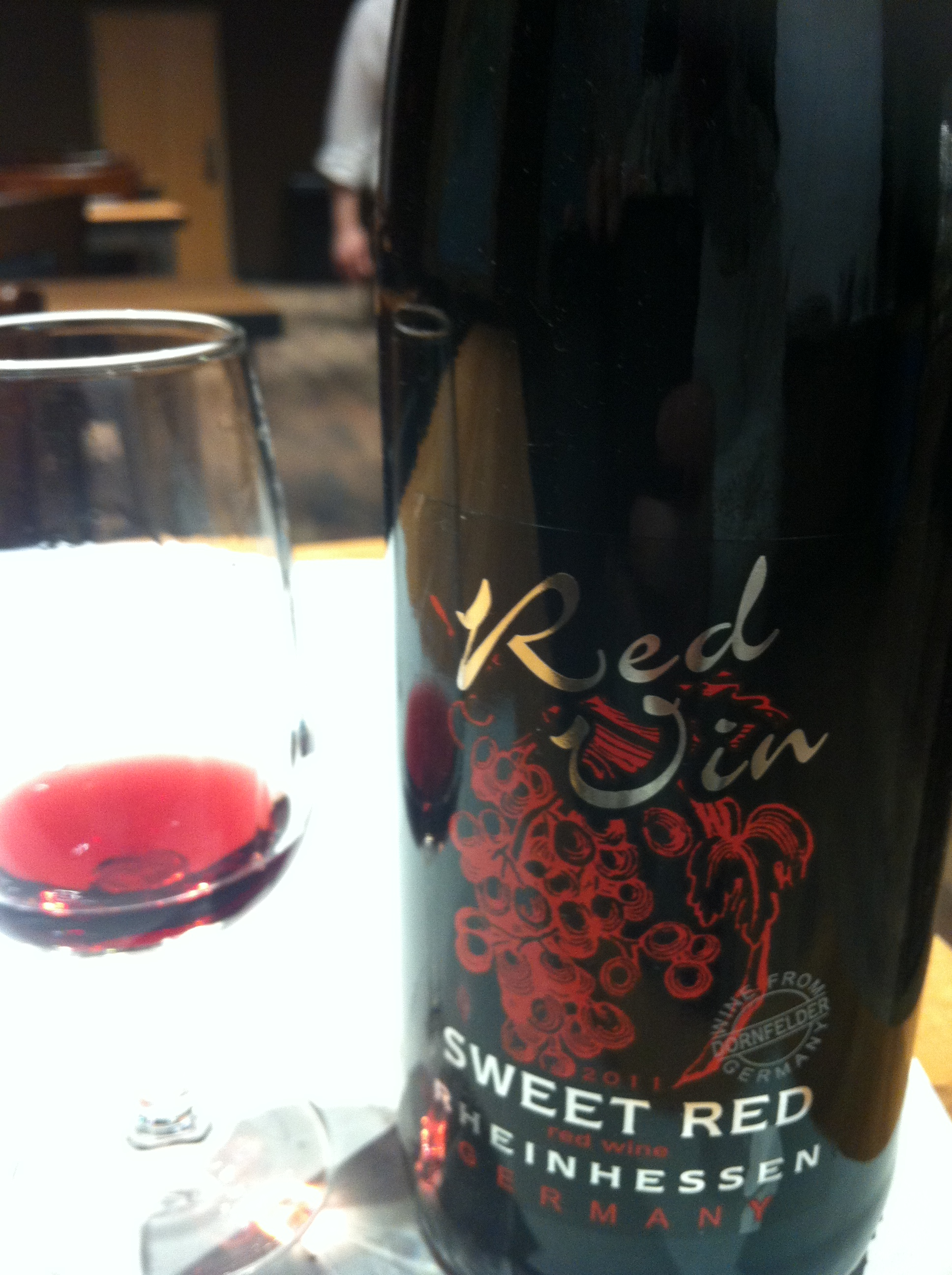
A red German wine labeling itself as "sweet"

Süssreserve (German: Süßreserve; lit. 'sweet reserve') is a wine term referring to a portion of selected unfermented grape must, free of microorganisms, to be added to wine as a sweetening component. This technique was developed in Germany and is used with German-style wines such as semi-sweet Riesling or Müller-Thurgau. The technique not only raises the sugar level of the wine, but also lowers the amount of alcohol. Under German law, no more than fifteen percent of the final wine's volume may be the reserved juice. This practice is allowed also for Prädikatswein, the highest level in the German wine classification. It is often used for semi-sweet Kabinett and Spätlese, but more rarely for Auslese and upward.

The use of Süssreserve results in a different composition of sugars in the wine in comparison to residual sugar from arrested fermentation. Grape must contains mainly the sugars glucose and fructose. When wine ferments, glucose is fermented at a faster rate than fructose. Thus, arresting fermentation after a significant portion of the sugars have fermented results in a wine where the residual sugar consists mainly of fructose, while the use of Süssreserve will result in a wine where the sweetness comes from a mixture of glucose and fructose.

== Terms used to indicate sweetness of wine ==
=== European Union terms for wine ===
According to EU regulation 753/2002, the following terms may be used on the labels of table wines and quality wines.

	Dry	Medium dry	Medium	Sweet
Sugar	up to 4 g/L	up to 12 g/L	up to 45 g/L	more than 45 g/L
If balanced with suitable acidity	up to 9 g/L	up to 18 g/L		
suitable acidity as g/L tartaric	less than 2 g/L below sugar content	less than 10 g/L below sugar content		

=== European Union terms for sparkling wine ===
An "Extra Dry" champagne

Sparkling wines have ratings according to Commission Regulation (EC) No 607/2009 of 14 July 2009.

Rating	Sugar content (grams per litre)
Brut Nature (no added sugar)	0–3
Extra Brut	0–6
Brut	0–12
Extra Dry, Extra Sec, Extra seco	12–17
Dry, Sec, Seco	17–32
Demi-sec, Semi-seco	32–50
Doux, Sweet, Dulce	50+

Article 58 points out "the sugar content may not differ by more than 3 grams per litre from what appears on the product label", so there is some leeway. For example, a sparkling wine with 9 grams per litre of residual sugar may be labelled as either the drier, less sweet, classification of Extra Brut (because 9 − 3 = 6 grams per litre), or the slightly sweeter classification of Brut or even Extra Dry/Extra Sec/Extra Seco (because 9 + 3 = 12 grams per litre).

The rules applicable to labellings before 14 July 2009 were:

Rating	Sugar content (grams per litre)
Brut Nature (no added sugar)	0–3
Extra Brut	0–6
Brut	0–15
Extra Dry, Extra Sec, Extra seco	12–20
Dry, Sec, Seco	17–35
Demi-sec, Semi-seco	33–50
Doux, Sweet, Dulce	50+

== Wine-producing countries ==
=== Austria ===
In Austria, the Klosterneuburger Mostwaage (KMW) scale is used. The scale is divided into Klosterneuburger Zuckergrade (°KMW), and very similar to the Oechsle scale (1 °KMW =~ 5 °Oe). However, the KMW measures the exact sugar content of the must.

=== Canada ===
In Canada, the wine industry measures wine sweetness as grams of sucrose in 100 grams of grape juice or grape must at 20 °C in degrees Brix.

=== Czech Republic and Slovakia ===
In Czech Republic and Slovakia, the Normalizovaný Moštoměr (°NM) scale is used. The scale measures kg of sugar in 100 L of must.

=== France ===
In France, the Baumé scale is occasionally used. Sélection de Grains Nobles (SGN) is French for "selection of noble berries" and refers to wines made from grapes affected by noble rot. SGN wines are sweet dessert wines with rich, concentrated flavours. Alsace wines were the first to be described as Sélection de Grains Nobles, with the legal definition introduced in 1984. The term is also used in some other wine regions of France, such as Loire.

Varieties	SGN since 2001	SGN before 2001
Gewürztraminer; Pinot Gris	279 grams per liter or 18.2% potential alcohol or 128 °Oe	16.4% potential alcohol or 117 °Oe
Riesling; Muscat	256 grams per liter or 16.4% potential alcohol or 117 °Oe	15.1% potential alcohol or 108 °Oe

=== Germany ===
In Germany, sweetness of must and wine is measured with the Oechsle scale, and below are ranges of minimum must weights for Riesling, depending on the region.

Kabinett – 67–82 °Oe

Spätlese – 76–90 °Oe

Auslese – 83–100 °Oe

Beerenauslese and Eiswein – 110–128 °Oe (Eiswein is made by late harvesting grapes after they have frozen on the vine and not necessarily affected by noble rot, botrytis, which is the case with Beerenauslese)

Trockenbeerenauslese – 150–154 °Oe (affected by botrytis)

=== Hungary ===
In Hungary, Tokaj wine region (also Tokaj-Hegyalja wine region or Tokaj–Hegyalja) has a more graduated terminology to describe Tokaji Aszú dessert wines:

Minimum residual sugar	Description
60	3 puttonyos
90	4 puttonyos
120	5 puttonyos
150	6 puttonyos
180	Aszú-Eszencia
450+	Eszencia

=== Spain ===
In Spain, the rules applicable to the sweet and fortified Denominations of Origen Montilla-Moriles and Jerez-Xérès-Sherry are:

Fortified wine type	Alcohol % ABV	Sugar content (grams per litre)
Fino	15–17	0–5
Manzanilla	15–17	0–5
Amontillado	16–17	0–5
Palo Cortado	17–22	0–5
Oloroso	17–22	0–5
Dry	15–22	5–45
Pale Cream	15.5–22	45–115
Medium	15–22	5–115
Cream	15.5–22	115-140
Pedro Ximénez	15–22	212+
Moscatel	15–22	160+
Dulce / Sweet	15–22	160+

=== United States ===
In the United States, the wine industry measures the sweetness of must and wine in degrees Brix.

== See also ==
- Health effects of wine
- Wine and food matching
