= Malá Tŕňa =

Malá Tŕňa Kistoronya
- Municipality
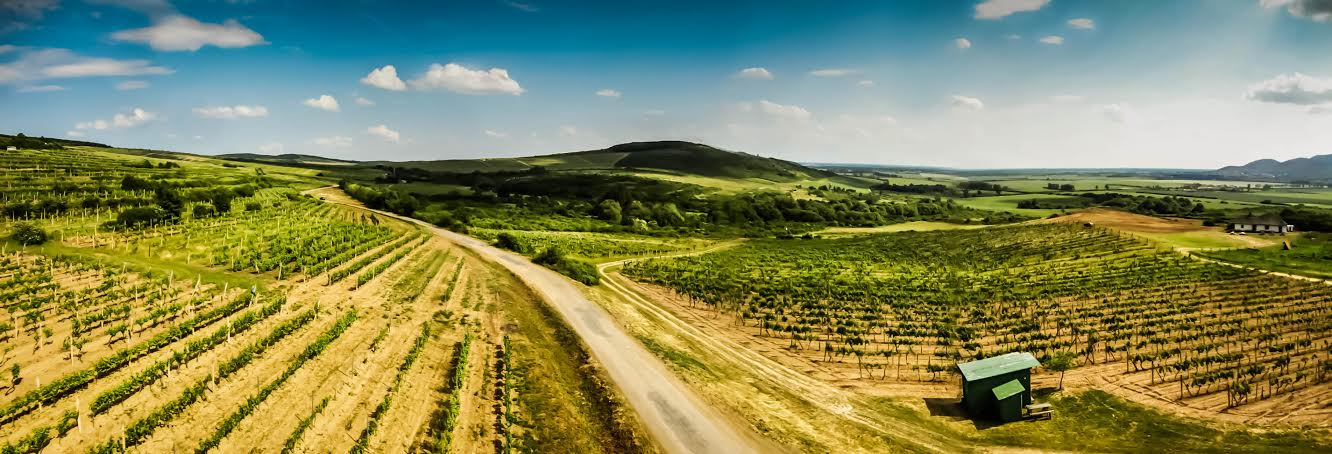
- Vineyards near Malá Tŕňa seen from the viewing tower

- Flag

- Location of Malá Tŕňa in the Košice Region Location of Malá Tŕňa in Slovakia
- Coordinates: 48.46°N 21.68°E
- Country: Slovakia
- Region: Košice Region
- District: Trebišov District
- First mentioned: 1392

Area
  - Total: 9.80 km^{2} (3.78 sq mi)
- Elevation: 167 m (548 ft)

Population (2025)
  - Total: 340
- Time zone: UTC+1 (CET)
  - Summer (DST): UTC+2 (CEST)
- Postal code: 768 2
- Area code: +421 56
- Vehicle registration plate (until 2022): TV
- Website: malatrna.eu

Malá Tŕňa (formerly Malá Toroňa; Hungarian: Kistoronya) is a village and municipality in the Trebišov District in the Košice Region of south-eastern Slovakia.

== History ==
In historical records, the village was first mentioned in 1392.

== Geography ==
The municipality lies at an altitude of 167 metres (548 ft) and covers an area of 9.80 km^{2} (3.78 sq mi) (2025).

== Population ==
Population statistic (10 years)
| Year | 1995 | 2005 | 2015 | 2025 |
|---|---|---|---|---|
| Count | 443 | 429 | 402 | 340 |
| Difference | | −3.16% | −6.29% | −15.42% |

Population statistic
| Year | 2024 | 2025 |
|---|---|---|
| Count | 342 | 340 |
| Difference | | −0.58% |

It has a population of 340 people (31 December 2025).

=== Ethnicity ===
Census 2021 (1+ %)
| Ethnicity | Number | Fraction |
|---|---|---|
| Slovak | 326 | 91.31% |
| Hungarian | 35 | 9.8% |
| Not found out | 16 | 4.48% |
| Romani | 5 | 1.4% |
| Total | 357 | |

In year 2021 was 357 people by ethnicity 326 as Slovak, 35 as Hungarian, 16 as Not found out, 5 as Romani, 3 as Other and 1 as Turkish.

Note on population: The difference values of population numbers in the table "Population statistic" and in the sections "Ethnicity" & "Religion" is caused by the use of various statistical methods.

=== Religion ===
Census 2021 (1+ %)
| Religion | Number | Fraction |
|---|---|---|
| Roman Catholic Church | 124 | 34.73% |
| Calvinist Church | 77 | 21.57% |
| Greek Catholic Church | 52 | 14.57% |
| None | 48 | 13.45% |
| Jehovah's Witnesses | 23 | 6.44% |
| Not found out | 13 | 3.64% |
| Evangelical Church | 7 | 1.96% |
| Christian Congregations in Slovakia | 5 | 1.4% |
| Other | 5 | 1.4% |
| Total | 357 | |

In year 2021 was 357 people by religion 124 from Roman Catholic Church, 77 from Calvinist Church, 52 from Greek Catholic Church, 48 from None, 23 from Jehovah's Witnesses, 13 from Not found out, 7 from Evangelical Church, 5 from Christian Congregations in Slovakia, 5 from Other, 2 from Eastern Orthodox Church and 1 from Seventh-day Adventist Church.

== Facilities ==
The village has a public library.

The village is located in the Tokaj wine region and contains several ancient wine cellars.

The village has a nearby viewing tower.

The village is furthest from the sea in Europe.

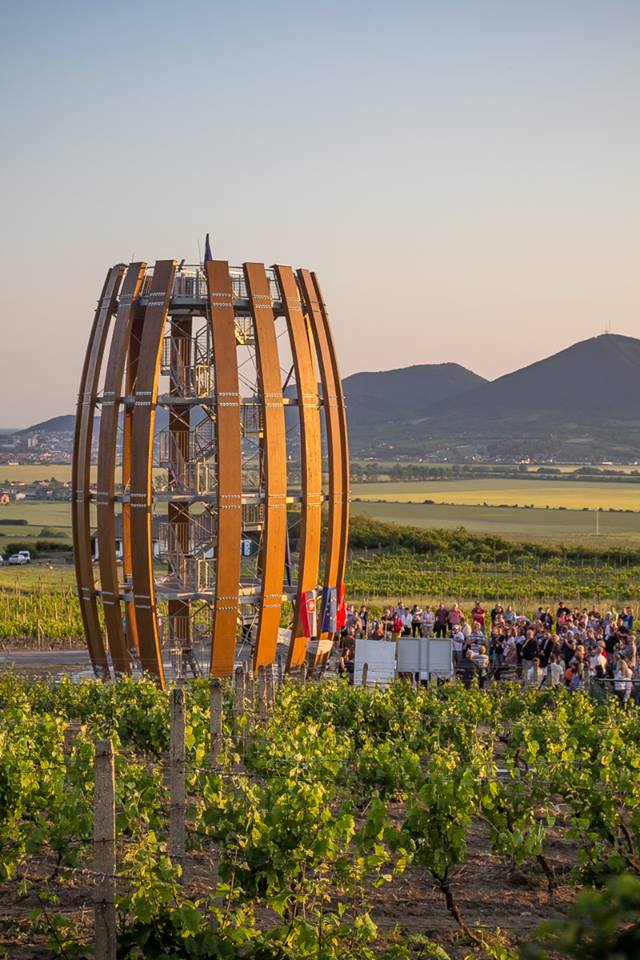
Barrel-shaped viewing tower nearby Malá Tŕňa

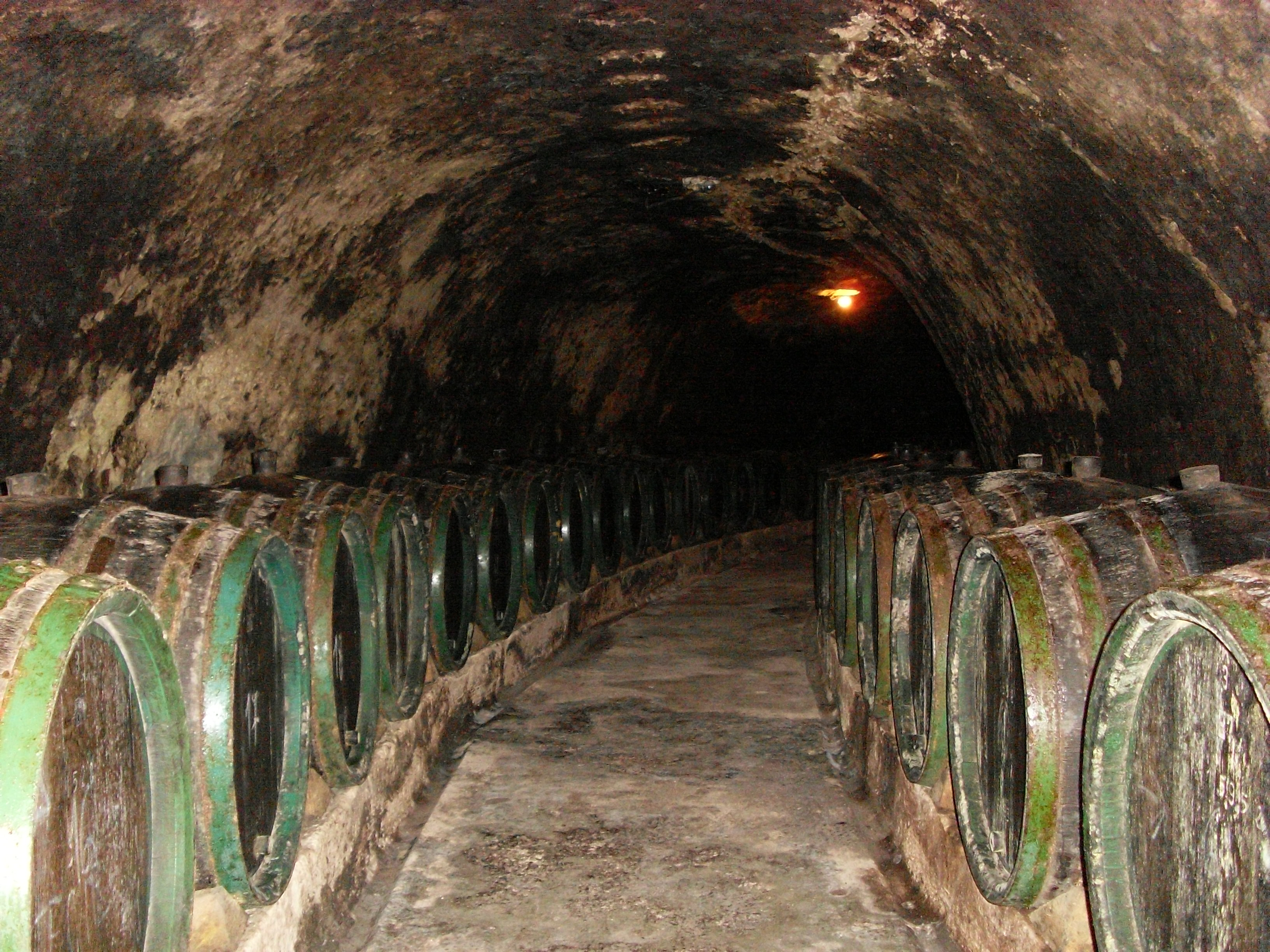
Medieval wine cellar in Malá Tŕňa
