= Kabar (grape) =

Variety of grape

- Grape (Vitis)
- Color of berry skin: Blanc
- Species: Vitis vinifera
- Also called: Tarcal 10
- Origin: Hungary
- Notable regions: Tokaj-Hegyalja
- VIVC number: 23149

Kabar grapes, also called "Tarcal 10", are a hybrid cross between Hárslevelű and Bouvier grapes. They were first grown in 1967 in Tarcal. They were officially recognized and approved for production in the Tokaj-Hegyalja region of Hungary in 2005. This cultivar ripens early in the year and has a relatively high sugar content, though it is prone to rot, including from botrytis.
