= Viničky =

Village and municipality in Slovakia

Viničky Szőlőske
- Municipality
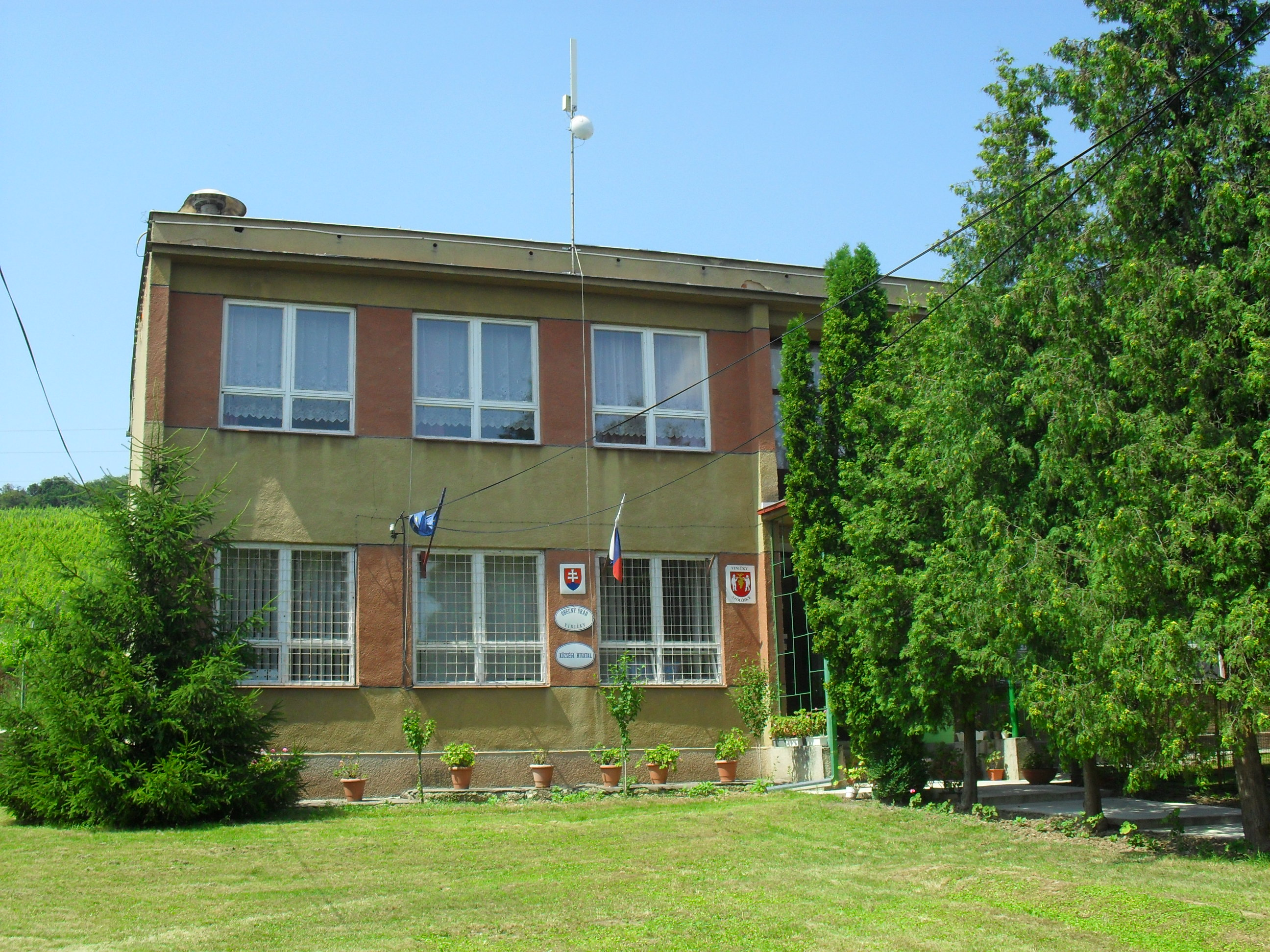

- Flag

- Location of Viničky in the Košice Region Location of Viničky in Slovakia
- Coordinates: 48.40°N 21.75°E
- Country: Slovakia
- Region: Košice Region
- District: Trebišov District
- First mentioned: 1273

Area
  - Total: 8.84 km^{2} (3.41 sq mi)
- Elevation: 99 m (325 ft)

Population (2025)
  - Total: 442
- Time zone: UTC+1 (CET)
  - Summer (DST): UTC+2 (CEST)
- Postal code: 763 1
- Area code: +421 56
- Vehicle registration plate (until 2022): TV
- Website: www.vinicky.sk

Viničky (Hungarian: Szőlőske) is a village and municipality in the Trebišov District in the Košice Region of south-eastern Slovakia.

== History ==
In historical records the village was first mentioned in 1273.

== Geography ==
The municipality lies at an altitude of 99 metres (325 ft) and covers an area of 8.84 km^{2} (3.41 sq mi) (2025).

== Population ==
Population statistic (10 years)
Year	1995	2005	2015	2025
Count	491	520	495	442
Difference		+5.90%	−4.80%	−10.70%

Population statistic
Year	2024	2025
Count	449	442
Difference		−1.55%

It has a population of 442 people (31 December 2025).

=== Ethnicity ===
Census 2021 (1+ %)
Ethnicity	Number	Fraction
Hungarian	289	60.71%
Slovak	223	46.84%
Not found out	23	4.83%
Total	476	

In year 2021 was 476 people by ethnicity 289 as Hungarian, 223 as Slovak, 23 as Not found out, 1 as Czech, 1 as Rusyn, 1 as Other and 1 as French.

Note on population: The difference values of population numbers in the table "Population statistic" and in the sections "Ethnicity" & "Religion" is caused by the use of various statistical methods.

=== Religion ===
Census 2021 (1+ %)
Religion	Number	Fraction
Calvinist Church	172	36.13%
Roman Catholic Church	138	28.99%
None	67	14.08%
Greek Catholic Church	62	13.03%
Not found out	17	3.57%
Evangelical Church	10	2.1%
Jehovah's Witnesses	7	1.47%
Total	476	

In year 2021 was 476 people by religion 172 from Calvinist Church, 138 from Roman Catholic Church, 67 from None, 62 from Greek Catholic Church, 17 from Not found out, 10 from Evangelical Church, 7 from Jehovah's Witnesses, 1 from Old Catholic Church, 1 from Other and 1 from United Methodist Church.

== Facilities ==
The village has a public library, a gym and a football pitch.
