= Veľká Tŕňa =

Village and municipality in Slovakia

Veľká Tŕňa Nagytoronya
- Municipality
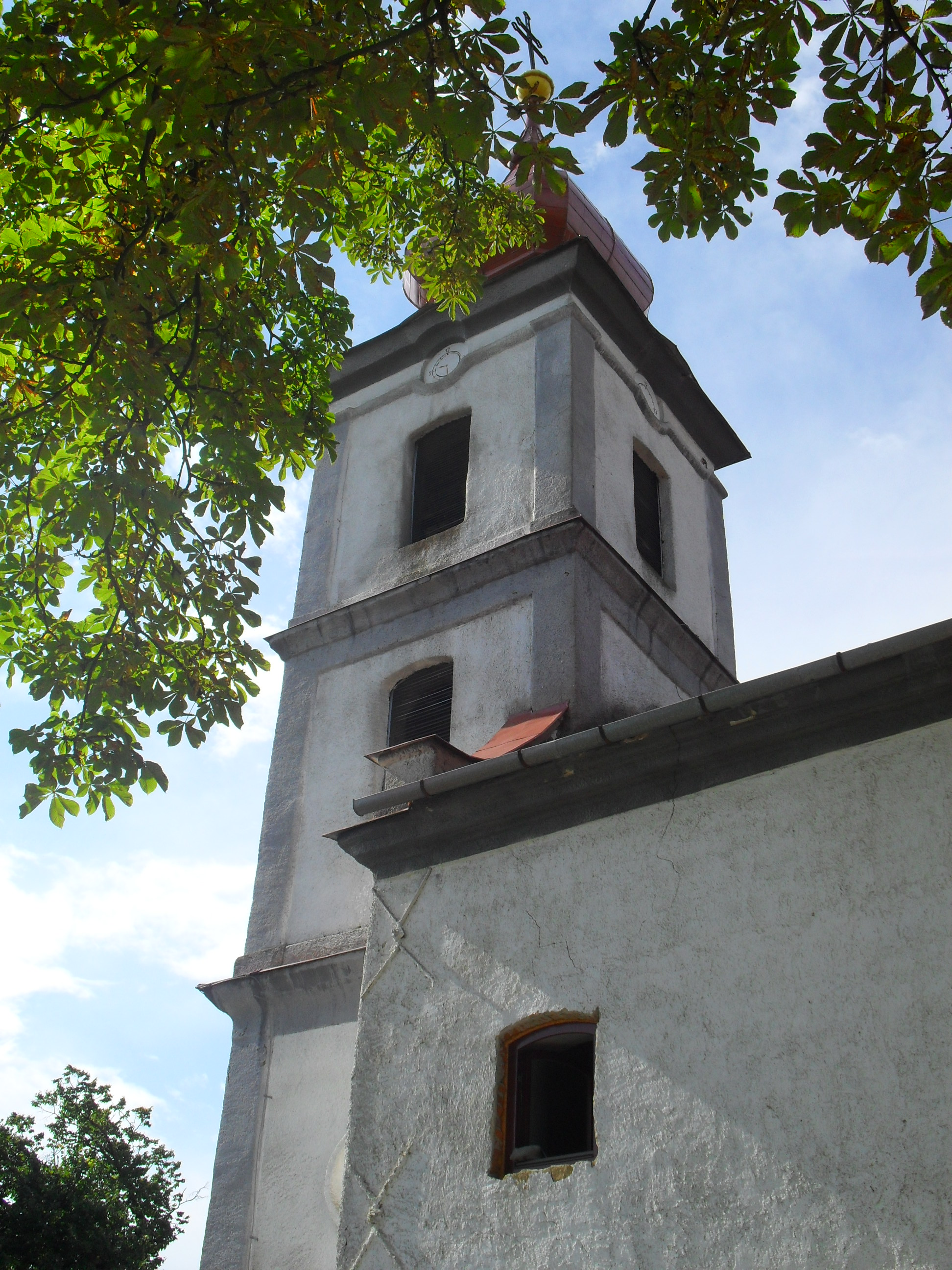

- Flag

- Location of Veľká Tŕňa in the Košice Region Location of Veľká Tŕňa in Slovakia
- Coordinates: 48.47°N 21.68°E
- Country: Slovakia
- Region: Košice Region
- District: Trebišov District
- First mentioned: 1220

Area
  - Total: 14.11 km^{2} (5.45 sq mi)
- Elevation: 174 m (571 ft)

Population (2025)
  - Total: 441
- Time zone: UTC+1 (CET)
  - Summer (DST): UTC+2 (CEST)
- Postal code: 768 2
- Area code: +421 56
- Vehicle registration plate (until 2022): TV
- Website: obecvelkatrna.sk

Veľká Tŕňa (Slovak pronunciation: [ˈʋeʎkaː ˈtr̩ːɲa]; Hungarian: Nagytoronya) is a village and municipality in the Trebišov District in the Košice Region of south-eastern Slovakia.

== History ==
In historical records the village was first mentioned in 1220.

== Geography ==
The municipality lies at an altitude of 174 metres (571 ft) and covers an area of 14.11 km^{2} (5.45 sq mi) (2025).

== Population ==
Population statistic (10 years)
| Year | 1995 | 2005 | 2015 | 2025 |
|---|---|---|---|---|
| Count | 534 | 453 | 447 | 441 |
| Difference | | −15.16% | −1.32% | −1.34% |

Population statistic
| Year | 2024 | 2025 |
|---|---|---|
| Count | 443 | 441 |
| Difference | | −0.45% |

It has a population of 441 people (31 December 2025).

=== Ethnicity ===
Census 2021 (1+ %)
| Ethnicity | Number | Fraction |
|---|---|---|
| Slovak | 434 | 94.96% |
| Not found out | 21 | 4.59% |
| Hungarian | 9 | 1.96% |
| Total | 457 | |

In year 2021 was 457 people by ethnicity 434 as Slovak, 21 as Not found out, 9 as Hungarian, 3 as Rusyn, 2 as Czech, 1 as Ukrainian and 1 as Greek.

Note on population: The difference values of population numbers in the table "Population statistic" and in the sections "Ethnicity" & "Religion" is caused by the use of various statistical methods.

=== Religion ===
Census 2021 (1+ %)
| Religion | Number | Fraction |
|---|---|---|
| Greek Catholic Church | 180 | 39.39% |
| Roman Catholic Church | 139 | 30.42% |
| Calvinist Church | 67 | 14.66% |
| None | 34 | 7.44% |
| Not found out | 22 | 4.81% |
| Evangelical Church | 5 | 1.09% |
| Total | 457 | |

In year 2021 was 457 people by religion 180 from Greek Catholic Church, 139 from Roman Catholic Church, 67 from Calvinist Church, 34 from None, 22 from Not found out, 5 from Evangelical Church, 4 from Eastern Orthodox Church, 4 from Jehovah's Witnesses, 1 from Old Catholic Church and 1 from Ad hoc movements.

== Facilities ==
The village has a public library and a football pitch.
