= Puttonyos =

Unit of sugar in Hungarian and Slovak dessert wine

Puttonyos is a unit for the level of sugar in Hungarian Tokaji. It is traditionally measured by the number of hods of sweet botrytised or nobly rotted grapes (known as Aszú) added to a barrel of wine, but is now measured in grams of residual sugar. The puttony was actually the 25 kg basket or hod of Aszú grapes, and the more added to the barrel of wine, the sweeter the eventual wine. Measurement ranges from 3 to 6 Puttonyos. A Tokaji made entirely from Aszú grapes is not labeled using the Puttonyos system but is known as Eszencia.

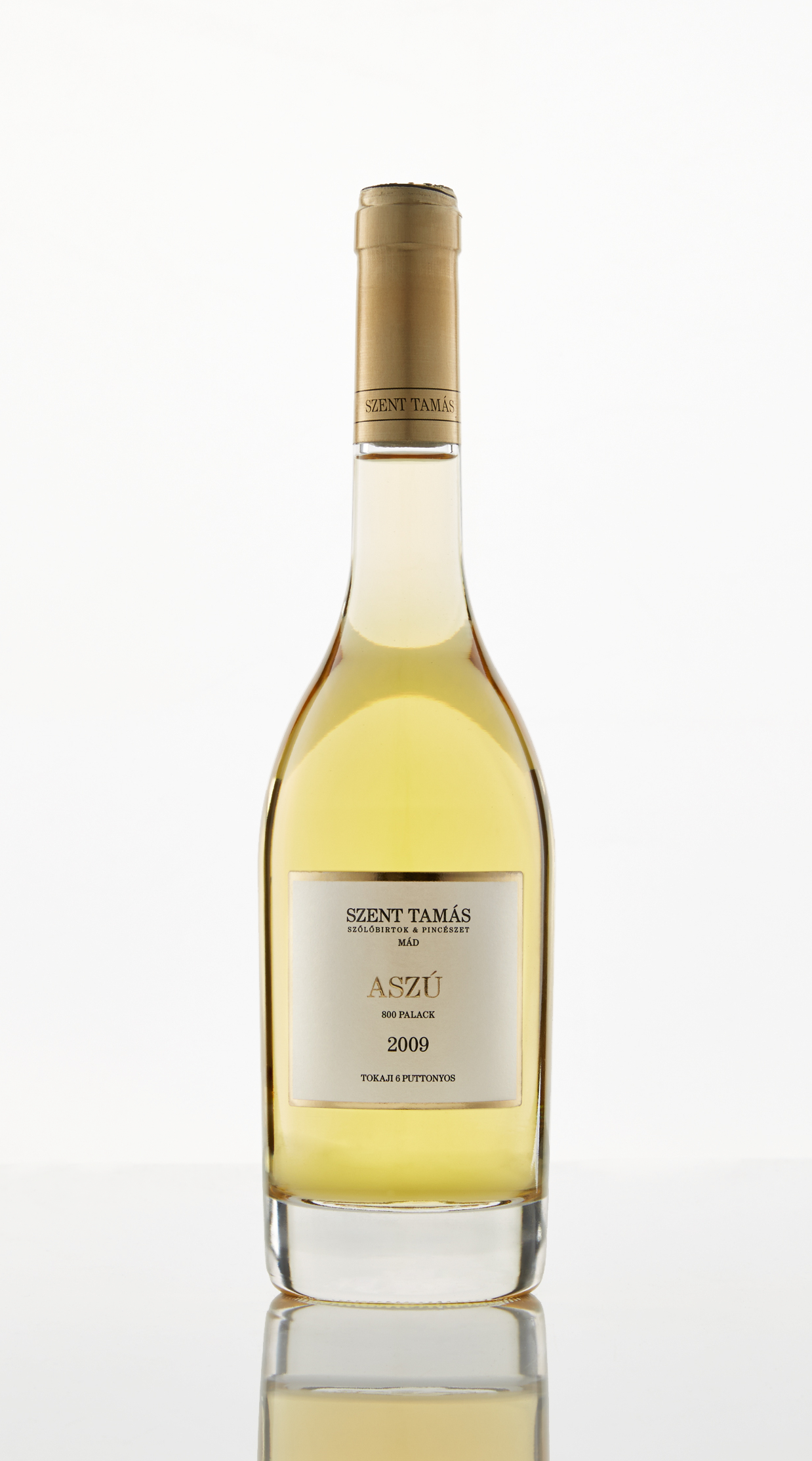
Szent Tamás Winery Aszú 2009

== Residual sugar levels (grams per litre) ==
- 3 Puttonyos – 60
- 4 Puttonyos – 90
- 5 Puttonyos – 120
- 6 Puttonyos – 150
- Aszú Eszencia – 180
- Eszencia – 450

== New regulations ==
From the 2013 harvest the new regulation requires minimum 120 g/L residual sugar in every Aszú wine. The producer still may use the puttonyos number on the label. The ageing criteria has also changed from minimum 2 years barrel and 1 year bottle ageing to minimum 18 months barrel ageing.
