= Čerhov =

Village and municipality in Slovakia

Čerhov Csörgő
- Municipality
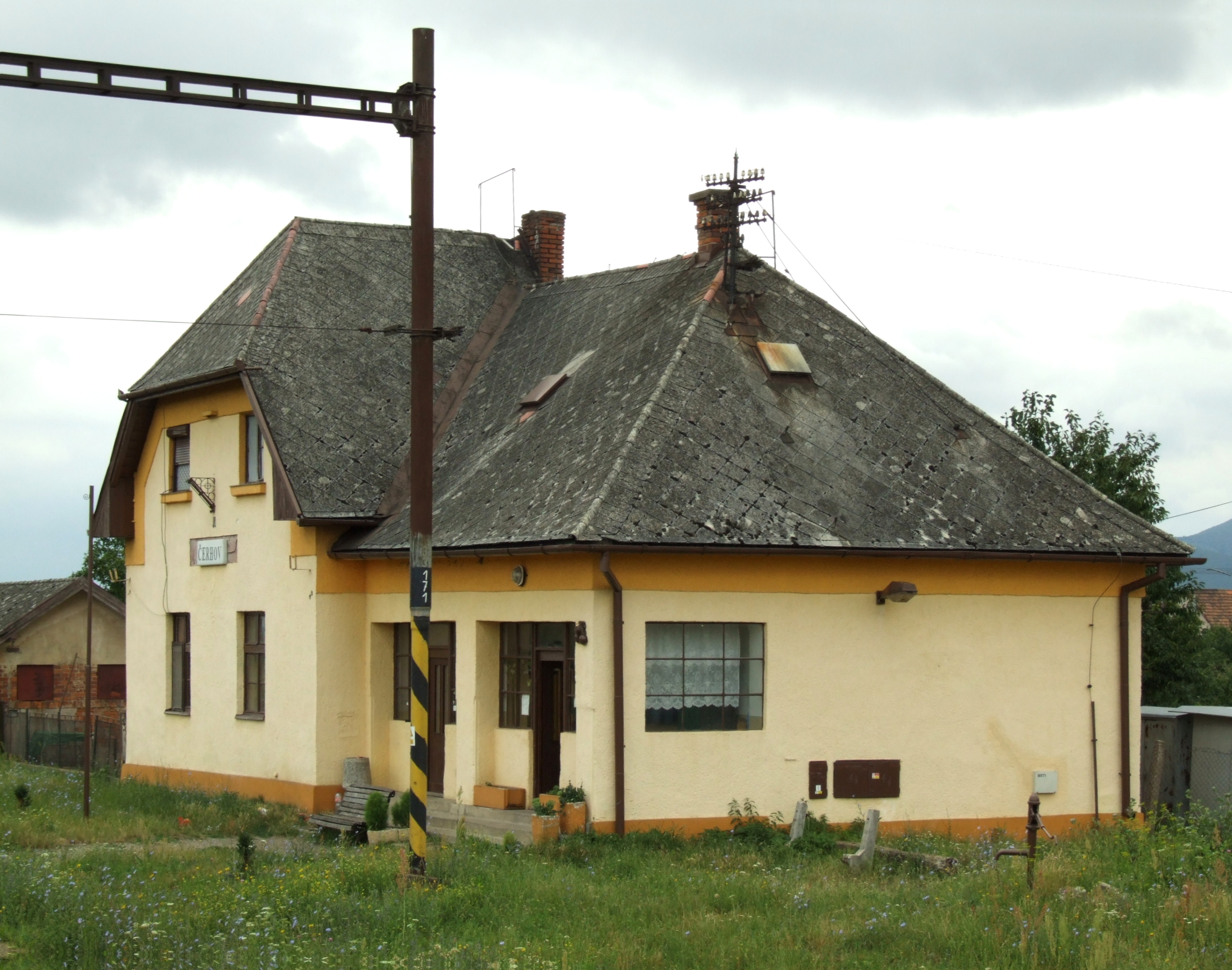

- Flag

- Location of Čerhov in the Košice Region Location of Čerhov in Slovakia
- Coordinates: 48.47°N 21.65°E
- Country: Slovakia
- Region: Košice Region
- District: Trebišov District
- First mentioned: 1329

Area
  - Total: 8.52 km^{2} (3.29 sq mi)
- Elevation: 129 m (423 ft)

Population (2025)
  - Total: 745
- Time zone: UTC+1 (CET)
  - Summer (DST): UTC+2 (CEST)
- Postal code: 768 1
- Area code: +421 56
- Vehicle registration plate (until 2022): TV
- Website: cerhov.sk

Čerhov (Hungarian: Csörgő) is a village and municipality in the Trebišov District in the Košice Region of eastern Slovakia.

== History ==
In historical records the village was first mentioned in 1076.

== Geography ==
The municipality lies at an altitude of 129 metres (423 ft) and covers an area of 8.52 km^{2} (3.29 sq mi) (2025).

== Population ==
Population statistic (10 years)
Year	1995	2005	2015	2025
Count	662	810	760	745
Difference		+22.35%	−6.17%	−1.97%

Population statistic
Year	2024	2025
Count	754	745
Difference		−1.19%

It has a population of 745 people (31 December 2025).

=== Ethnicity ===
Census 2021 (1+ %)
Ethnicity	Number	Fraction
Slovak	682	91.05%
Not found out	55	7.34%
Romani	20	2.67%
Total	749	

In year 2021 was 749 people by ethnicity 682 as Slovak, 55 as Not found out, 20 as Romani, 7 as Hungarian, 5 as Rusyn, 4 as Czech, 2 as German, 2 as Other and 1 as Jewish.

Note on population: The difference values of population numbers in the table "Population statistic" and in the sections "Ethnicity" & "Religion" is caused by the use of various statistical methods.

=== Religion ===
Census 2021 (1+ %)
Religion	Number	Fraction
Roman Catholic Church	366	48.87%
Greek Catholic Church	220	29.37%
None	71	9.48%
Not found out	59	7.88%
Eastern Orthodox Church	13	1.74%
Calvinist Church	10	1.34%
Total	749	

In year 2021 was 749 people by religion 366 from Roman Catholic Church, 220 from Greek Catholic Church, 71 from None, 59 from Not found out, 13 from Eastern Orthodox Church, 10 from Calvinist Church, 3 from Other, 3 from Ad hoc movements, 2 from Jehovah's Witnesses and 2 from Evangelical Church.

== Facilities ==
The village has a public library and a swimming pool.

== Genealogical resources ==
The records for genealogical research are available at the state archive "Statny Archiv in Kosice, Slovakia"

- Roman Catholic church records (births/marriages/deaths): 1849-1922 (parish B)
- Greek Catholic church records (births/marriages/deaths): 1770-1895 (parish B)
- Reformated church records (births/marriages/deaths): 1770-1933 (parish B)

== See also ==
- List of municipalities and towns in Slovakia
