= Černochov =

Village and municipality in Slovakia

Černochov Csarnahó
- Municipality
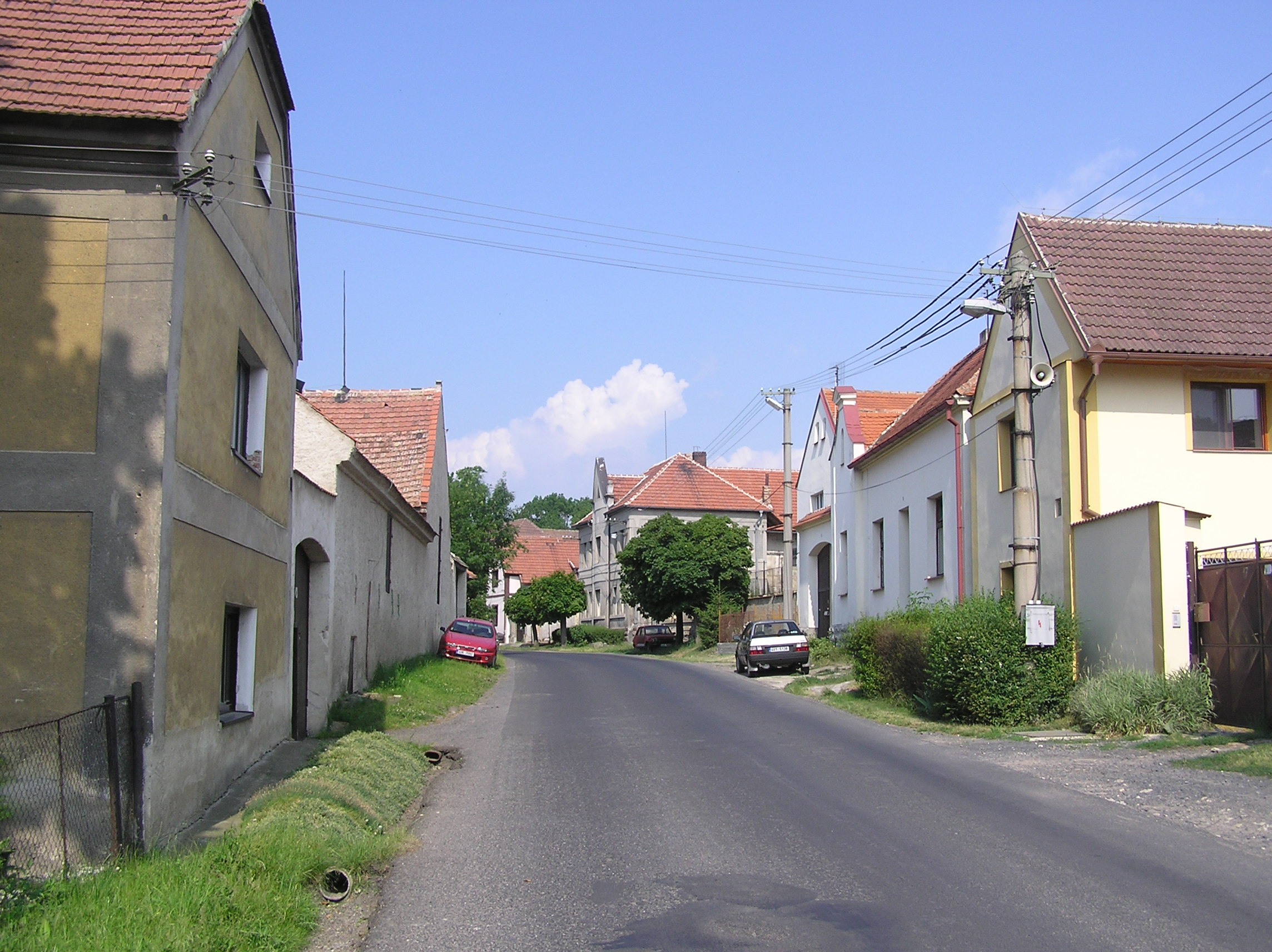

- Flag

- Location of Černochov in the Košice Region Location of Černochov in Slovakia
- Coordinates: 48.43°N 21.73°E
- Country: Slovakia
- Region: Košice Region
- District: Trebišov District
- First mentioned: 1298

Area
  - Total: 6.15 km^{2} (2.37 sq mi)
- Elevation: 167 m (548 ft)

Population (2025)
  - Total: 182
- Time zone: UTC+1 (CET)
  - Summer (DST): UTC+2 (CEST)
- Postal code: 763 2
- Area code: +421 56
- Vehicle registration plate (until 2022): TV
- Website: cernochov.sk

Černochov (Slovak pronunciation: [ˈtʂernɔxɔw]; Hungarian: Csarnahó) is a village and municipality in the Trebišov District in the Košice Region of south-eastern Slovakia.

== History ==
In historical records the village was first mentioned in 1298.

== Geography ==
The municipality lies at an altitude of 167 metres (548 ft) and covers an area of 6.15 km^{2} (2.37 sq mi) (2025).

== Population ==
Population statistic (10 years)
Year	1995	2005	2015	2025
Count	233	220	200	182
Difference		−5.57%	−9.09%	−9%

Population statistic
Year	2024	2025
Count	187	182
Difference		−2.67%

It has a population of 182 people (31 December 2025).

=== Ethnicity ===
Census 2021 (1+ %)
Ethnicity	Number	Fraction
Hungarian	122	64.89%
Slovak	83	44.14%
Total	188	

In year 2021 was 188 people by ethnicity 122 as Hungarian, 83 as Slovak, 1 as Jewish and 1 as Not found out.

Note on population: The difference values of population numbers in the table "Population statistic" and in the sections "Ethnicity" & "Religion" is caused by the use of various statistical methods.

=== Religion ===
Census 2021 (1+ %)
Religion	Number	Fraction
Calvinist Church	129	68.62%
Roman Catholic Church	24	12.77%
Jehovah's Witnesses	12	6.38%
None	8	4.26%
Greek Catholic Church	7	3.72%
Evangelical Church	5	2.66%
Not found out	2	1.06%
Total	188	

In year 2021 was 188 people by religion 129 from Calvinist Church, 24 from Roman Catholic Church, 12 from Jehovah's Witnesses, 8 from None, 7 from Greek Catholic Church, 5 from Evangelical Church, 2 from Not found out and 1 from United Methodist Church.

== Facilities ==
The village has a public library and a football pitch.

== Genealogical resources ==
The records for genealogical research are available at the state archive "Statny Archiv in Kosice, Slovakia"

- Reformated church records (births/marriages/deaths): 1854–1934 (parish A)

== See also ==
- List of municipalities and towns in Slovakia
