= Bara, Trebišov District =

Village in Trebišov District, Hungary

Bara Bári
- Municipality
- Flag

- Location of Bara in the Košice Region Location of Bara in Slovakia
- Coordinates: 48.43°N 21.72°E
- Country: Slovakia
- Region: Košice Region
- District: Trebišov District
- First mentioned: 1296

Area
  - Total: 6.25 km^{2} (2.41 sq mi)
- Elevation: 152 m (499 ft)

Population (2025)
  - Total: 260
- Time zone: UTC+1 (CET)
  - Summer (DST): UTC+2 (CEST)
- Postal code: 763 2
- Area code: +421 56
- Vehicle registration plate (until 2022): TV
- Website: www.obecbara.sk

Bara (Hungarian: Bári) is a village and municipality in the Trebišov District in the Košice Region of eastern Slovakia.

== History ==
The village was first mentioned as Bary in historical records from 1296. Until 1920, it was part of Hungary. From 1938 until 1944, it was occupied by Hungary under the First Vienna Award.

== Geography ==
The municipality lies at an altitude of 152 metres (499 ft) and covers an area of 6.25 km^{2} (2.41 sq mi) (2025).

== Population ==
Population statistic (10 years)
Year	1995	2005	2015	2025
Count	354	342	299	260
Difference		−3.38%	−12.57%	−13.04%

Population statistic
Year	2024	2025
Count	267	260
Difference		−2.62%

It has a population of 260 people (31 December 2025).

=== Ethnicity ===
Census 2021 (1+ %)
Ethnicity	Number	Fraction
Hungarian	168	60%
Slovak	130	46.42%
Not found out	8	2.85%
Total	280	

In year 2021 was 280 people by ethnicity 168 as Hungarian, 130 as Slovak, 8 as Not found out and 1 as Czech.

Note on population: The difference values of population numbers in the table "Population statistic" and in the sections "Ethnicity" & "Religion" is caused by the use of various statistical methods.

=== Religion ===
Census 2021 (1+ %)
Religion	Number	Fraction
Calvinist Church	176	62.86%
Roman Catholic Church	51	18.21%
Jehovah's Witnesses	15	5.36%
None	14	5%
Evangelical Church	11	3.93%
Not found out	7	2.5%
Greek Catholic Church	6	2.14%
Total	280	

In year 2021 was 280 people by religion 176 from Calvinist Church, 51 from Roman Catholic Church, 15 from Jehovah's Witnesses, 14 from None, 11 from Evangelical Church, 7 from Not found out and 6 from Greek Catholic Church.

== Genealogical resources ==
The records for genealogical research are available at the state archive in Košice (Slovak: Štátny archív v Košiciach).

- Greek Catholic church records (births/marriages/deaths): 1770-1895 (parish B)
- Reformated church records (births/marriages/deaths): 1782-1945 (parish A)

== See also ==
- List of municipalities and towns in Slovakia
