= Bouvier (grape) =

Variety of grape

- Grape (Vitis)
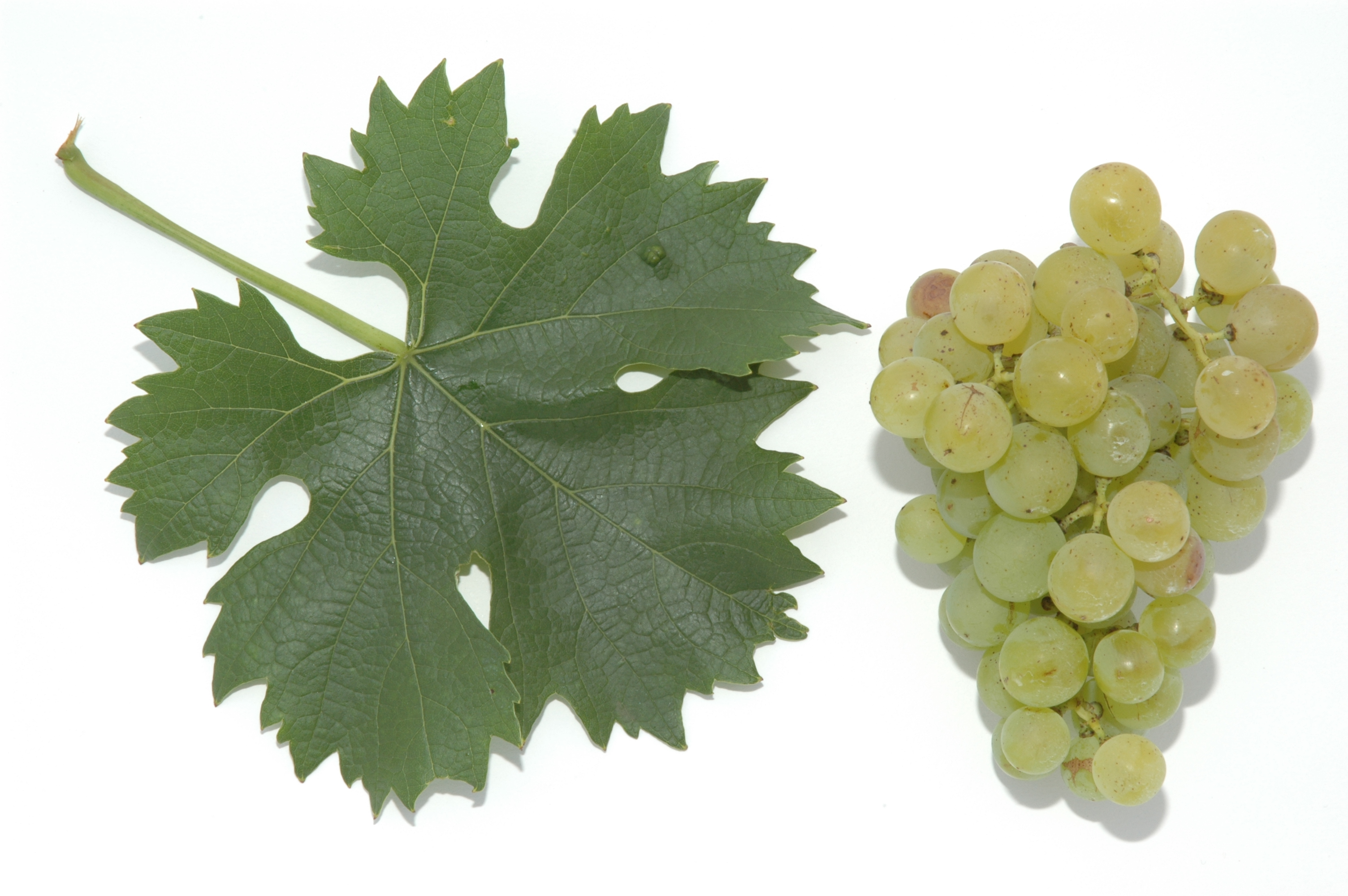
- Color of berry skin: Blanc
- Species: Vitis vinifera
- Also called: see 'Synonyms'
- Origin: Austria-Hungary (present-day Slovenia)
- Original pedigree: Pinot × Muscat à Petits Grains
- Formation of seeds: Complete
- Sex of flowers: Hermaphrodite
- VIVC number: 1625

Bouvier is a white wine grape and table grape planted primarily in Central Europe—most notably in Austria, Hungary, Slovakia and Slovenia, where it is also known as Ranina.

In Austria, where it was grown on 365 hectares (900 acres) as of 1999, Bouvier is used primarily for Sturm—a seasonally produced semi-fermented grape must—and young-bottled wines. In Germany, Bouvier was cultivated on 31 ha (77 acres) as of 2004.

Bouvier ripens very early, is resistant to frost, and gives a rather low yield. Its wines are golden yellow, mild in taste and have a Muscat aroma.

== History and pedigree ==
Winery owner Clotar Bouvier (1853–1930) discovered a vine of this variety in his vineyard in Herzogburg, Ober-Radkersburg (in present-day Slovenia) in the year 1900. He used this vine as a basis for breeding and, after several years of selection, started to sell it, after which it became widely spread across Austria-Hungary. DNA profiling has revealed Bouvier to be a crossing (probably a natural one) of a Pinot variety (which could be Pinot noir, Pinot gris or Pinot blanc) and another, unidentified variety, possibly Muscat à Petits Grains according to the Vitis International Variety Catalogue.

In 1963 at the Kölyuktetö viticultural research facility in Eger, viticulturists László Bereznai and József Csizmazia crossed Bouvier with Eger 2 (a selfling of Villard blanc) to produce the Hungarian wine grape Bianca.

== Synonyms ==
Bouvier is also known under the synonyms Bela Ranina, Bela Ranka, Boouvierovo Grozno, Bouvier blanc, Bouvier Précoce, Bouvier Trante weisse, Bouvier Traube weisse, Bouvierov Hrozen, Bouvierova Ranina, Bouvierovo Grozno, Bouvierovo Hrozno, Bouvierovo Ranina, Bouvierrebe, Bouviertraube, Bouviertraube weisse, Bouvieruv Hrozen, Bouvijejeva Ranka, Bouvijeorva Ranina, Bouvijerova Ranka, Bovije, Buveleova Ranka, Buvie, Buvierov Hrozen, Buvije, Buvijeova Ranina, Buvijeova Ranka, Buvijeva Ranka, Buvileova Ranka, Chasselas Bouvier, Findling, Kimmig Kp 1, Précoce de Bouvier, Précoce de Bouvier bianco, Précoce de Bouvier blanc, Précoce di Bouvier bianco, Radgonska Ranina, Radgonska Ranina bijela, Ragdonska Ranina bela, Ranina, Ranina bela, Ranka, and Sasla Buvije.
