= Hungarian wine =

Wine making in Hungary

Hungarian wine has a history dating back to at least the Kingdom of Hungary. Outside Hungary, the best-known wines are the white dessert wine Tokaji aszú (particularly in the Czech Republic, Poland, and Slovakia) and the red wine Bull's Blood of Eger (Egri Bikavér).

== Etymology ==
The Hungarian word for wine "bor" is of Old Turkic origin

Only three European languages have words for wine that are not derived from Latin: Greek, Basque, and Hungarian. The Hungarian word for wine, "bor", is of Old Turkic origin, identical to the Uyghur word for wine (bor), ultimately derived from Middle Persian.

== History ==
Vineyards may have been present within the area of today’s Hungary since at least the Roman province of Pannonia, possibly dating back earlier to local Celtic tribes. By the 5th century, there are records of extensive vineyards in the area. The Hungarians brought their wine-making knowledge from the East, with evidence of winemaking traditions from the Caucasus and Inner Asia. According to Ibn Rustah, the Hungarian tribes were familiar with wine-making a long time before the Hungarian conquest of the Carpathian Basin.

Over the following centuries, new grape varieties were brought in from Italy and France. Most of the production was of white wine in that period.

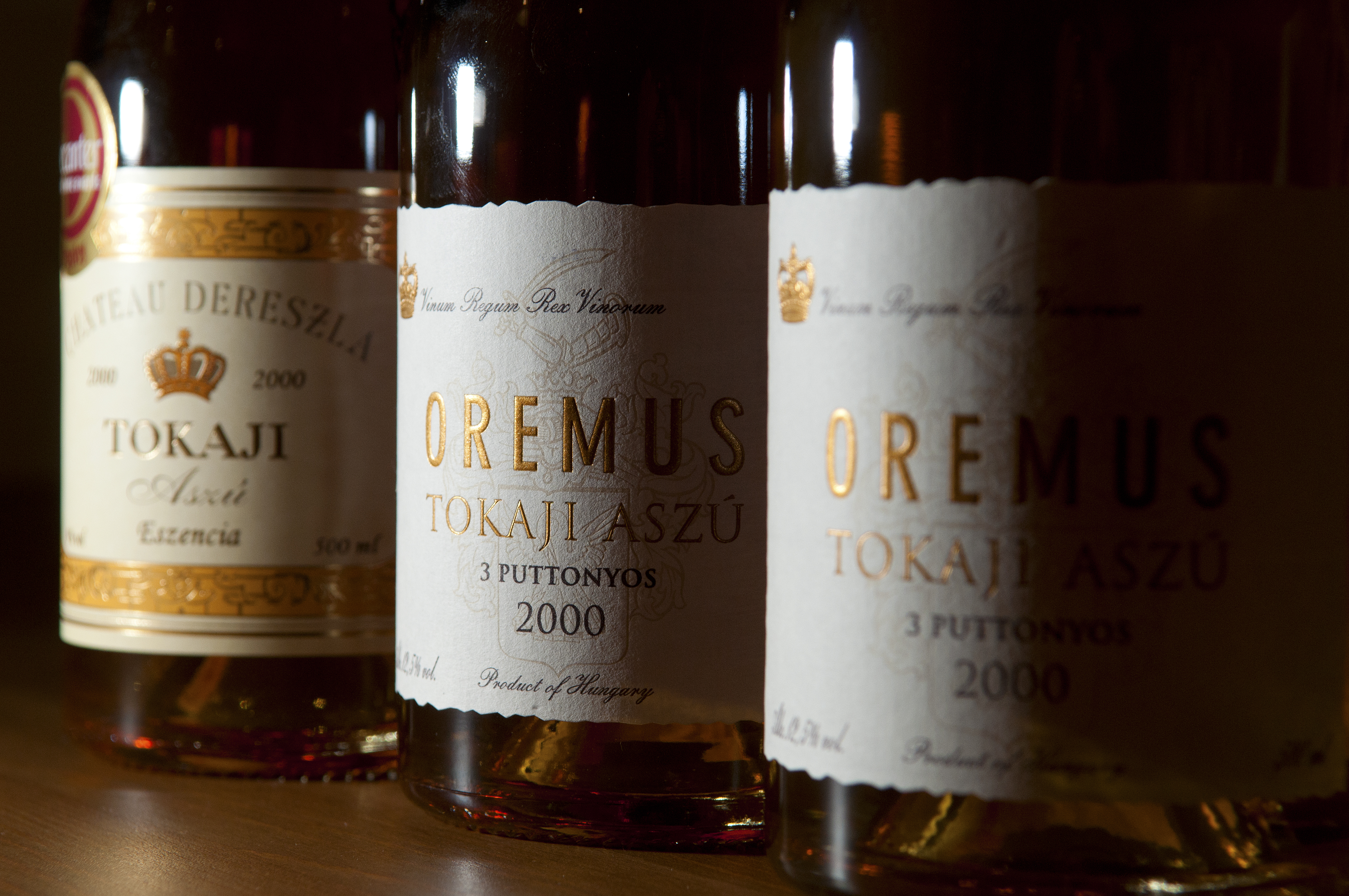
Bottles of Tokaji wine, made from the Zéta grape

During the Ottoman occupation of Hungary, an ancient variety of grapes was used to make the robust red-wine blend later known as Bikavér (Bull's Blood), after a supposed secret ingredient in the wine that fortified the defenders of Eger in 1552.

It was also during the Turkish occupation that the Tokaj region became known for dessert wines, harvested late to encourage noble rot. Tokaji aszú is mentioned in a document of 1571, and it was famously christened by Louis XIV of France (1638-1715) "Vinum Regum, Rex Vinorum" – Wine of Kings, King of Wines.

After the Ottoman Empire ceded Hungary to the Austrians in 1699, the Germanic influence was felt with the introduction of grape varieties such as Blauer Portugieser. That influence also showed in the start in 1730 of the world's first vineyard classification in Tokaj, based on soil, aspect and propensity to noble rot.

From 1882, the phylloxera epidemic hit Hungary hard, with the traditional field blends of Eger and the many grapes of Tokaj being replaced with monocultures, often of Blaufränkisch (Kékfrankos) and the Bordeaux varieties in red wine districts, and of Furmint, Muscat and Hárslevelű in Tokaj. The 20th century saw the introduction of modern grapes such as Zweigelt, which were easier to grow and to vinify than Kadarka. Under Communism quality was neglected in favour of overcropping, pasteurisation, and industrial production. Since 1989, there has been renewed interest in the traditional varieties and much new investment, particularly in Tokaj-Hegyalja.

== Wine regions and styles ==
The 22 wine regions of Hungary: 1 Sopron, 2 Nagy-Somló, 3 Zala, 4 Balatonfelvidék, 5 Badacsony, 6 Balatonfüred-Csopak, 7 Balatonboglár, 8 Pannonhalma, 9 Mór, 10 Etyek-Buda, 11 Neszmély, 12 Tolna, 13 Szekszárd, 14 Pécs, 15 Villány, 16 Hajós-Baja, 17 Kunság, 18 Csongrád, 19 Mátra, 20 Eger, 21 Bükk, 22 Tokaj

The official list of wine regions is defined by a ministerial decree. The current list includes 22 wine regions, which are usually grouped into five to seven larger regions.

=== Balaton, with sub-regions ===
- Badacsony: volcanic soils, full-bodied whites with considerable acidity. One of the few sources of Kéknyelű grapes.
- Balatonboglár: full-bodied whites and reds with moderate acidity.
- Balaton-felvidék: volcanic soils, full-bodied whites with considerable acidity.
- Balatonfüred-Csopak: terra rossa soils, full-bodied whites with considerable acidity.
- Nagy-Somló (or Somló): volcanic soil, full-bodied whites with high acidity. Main varieties are: Olaszrizling, Hárslevelű and Furmint.
- Zala: mainly white wines.

The main variety of the region is Olaszrizling.

==== Duna, with sub-regions ====
- Csongrád,
- Hajós-Baja,
- Kunság.

Many varieties of fresh and light wines.

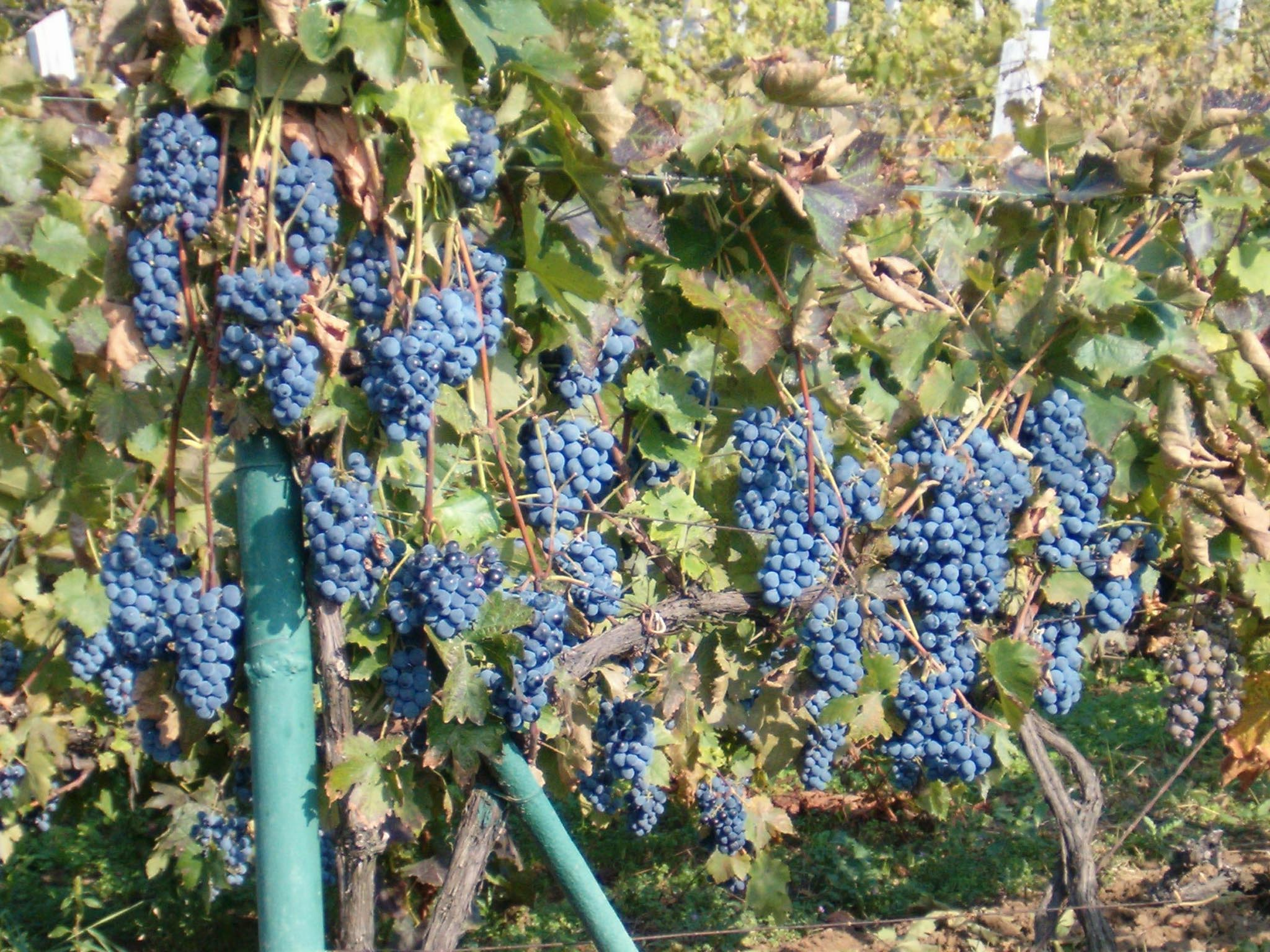
Grapes in an Upper Hungarian vineyard.

==== Eger, with sub-regions ====
- Bükk: mainly white wines.
- Eger: fresh whites from Leányka and Királyleányka, full-bodied whites mainly from Olaszrizling or Chardonnay. Home of the Egri Bikavér (bulls blood of Eger), an elegant red blend, mainly based on Kékfrankos. Good Pinot noirs.
- Mátra: elegant and full-bodied whites, grown on volcanic soil. Main varieties are Müller-Thurgau, Olaszrizling and Chardonnay.

==== Észak-Dunántúl, with sub-regions ====
- Neszmély: fresh and aromatic whites.
- Etyek-Buda: fresh white wines, with considerable acidity.
- Mór: volcanic soil, full-bodied whites. Main variety: Ezerjó.
- Pannonhalma: full-bodied whites.
- Sopron: elegant reds (mainly Kékfrankos).

==== Pannon, with sub-regions ====
- Pécs: mainly whites. Traditional variety: Cirfandli
- Szekszárd: full-bodied reds, with a bit of spice. Famous wine: Szekszárdi Bikavér. Main varieties: Kadarka, Kékfrankos, Cabernet franc, Merlot
- Tolna
- Villány: robust, full-bodied, spicy reds. Main varieties: Blauer Portugieser, Cabernet Sauvignon, Cabernet Franc, Merlot and occasionally Pinot Noir.

==== Sopron, with sub-regions ====
- Sopron

==== Tokaj ====
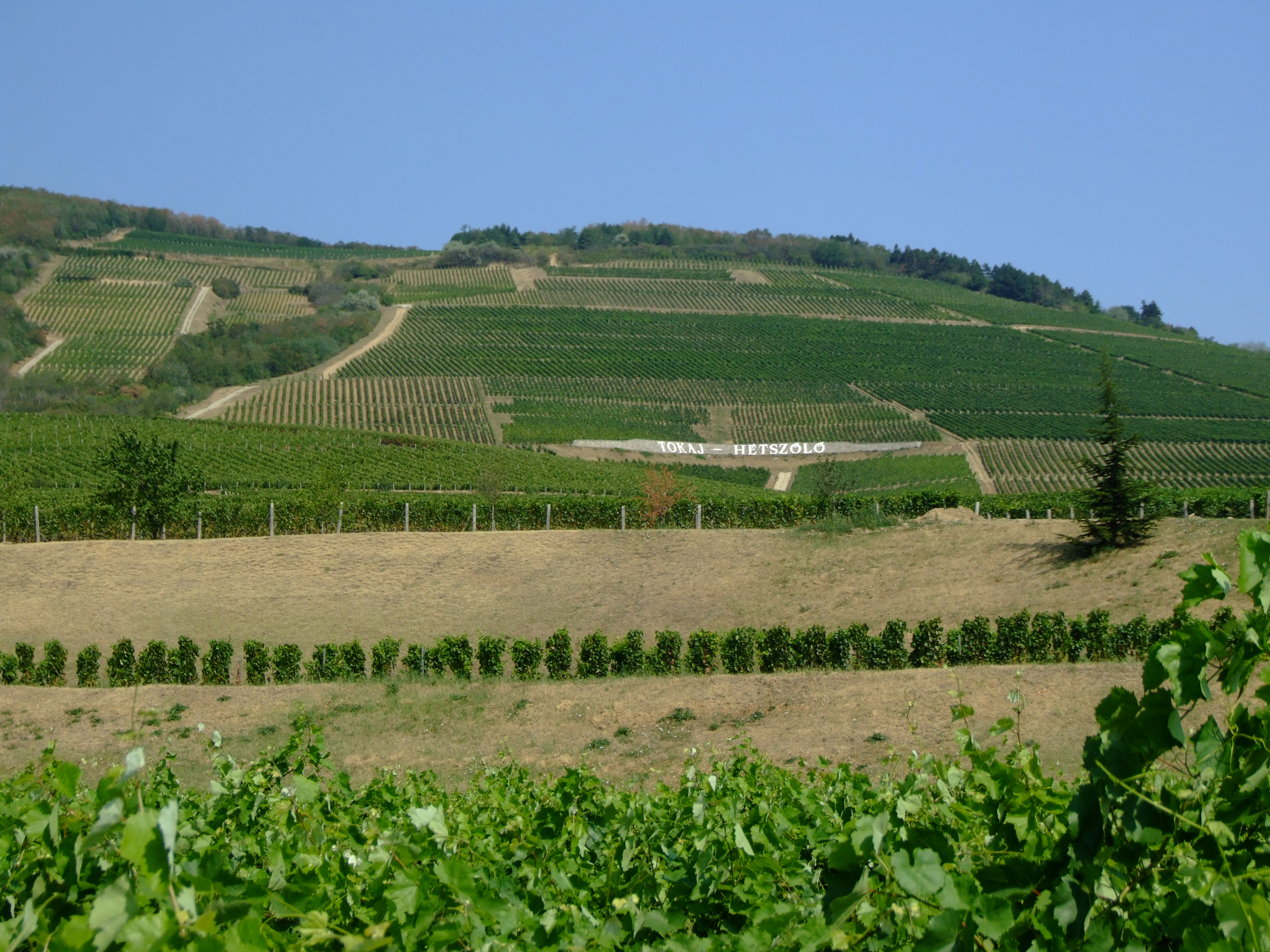
A Tokaji vineyard.

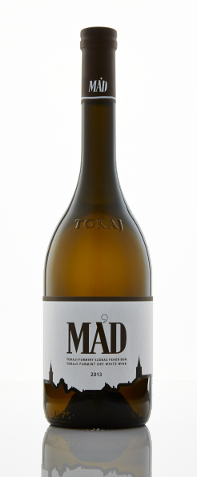
The first village level dry Furmint in the Tokaji wine region

Hungary's most famous wine region lies in the foothills of the Zemplén Mountains of the far north of the country; in fact the traditional area crosses into the southeast corner of modern Slovakia. The area is notable for its long warm autumns and mists that come in from the River Bodrog, creating perfect conditions for noble rot. This can contribute towards creating the botrytised (aszú) grapes for which the region is famous. These are individually picked as late as mid-November into buckets (puttonyos) and crushed to a paste. Varying amounts of this aszú paste are then added to non-aszú must or wine made from a mix of Furmint, Hárslevelű, Muscat Blanc à Petits Grains, Kövérszőlő or Zéta grapes, and left to ferment. The resulting wine is then aged in relatively small barrels in a labyrinth of cellars in the soft volcanic tuff, on whose walls thick blankets of fungus regulate the humidity.

Given that aszú conditions only happen in perhaps three vintages per decade, much dry Furmint is also produced. Other grapes grown in the area include Hárslevelű, Muscat Blanc, Kövérszőlő and Zéta.

For centuries the main product of the area was the sweet wine, mainly the botrytised selections. The dry Furmint drew the attention of the world's wine connoisseurs and experts when the Úrágya 2000 single vineyard selection was introduced by István Szepsy. The wine expressed elevated minerality, complexity and structure, which critics say has been experienced only in the finest white wines of historic regions like Burgundy or the Mosel before. The aging potential was also promising. In 2003 more producers of Mád village produced single vineyard selected dry Furmint wines with great success. Mád village, with its almost 1200 ha, had the opportunity to produce high quality dry Furmint wine in significant quantity as a commune level wine, which can express the unique volcanic terroir of the region, this wine is named after its appellation Mád and produced by István Szepsy Jr. in the Szent Tamás Winery.

== Hungarian grape varieties ==
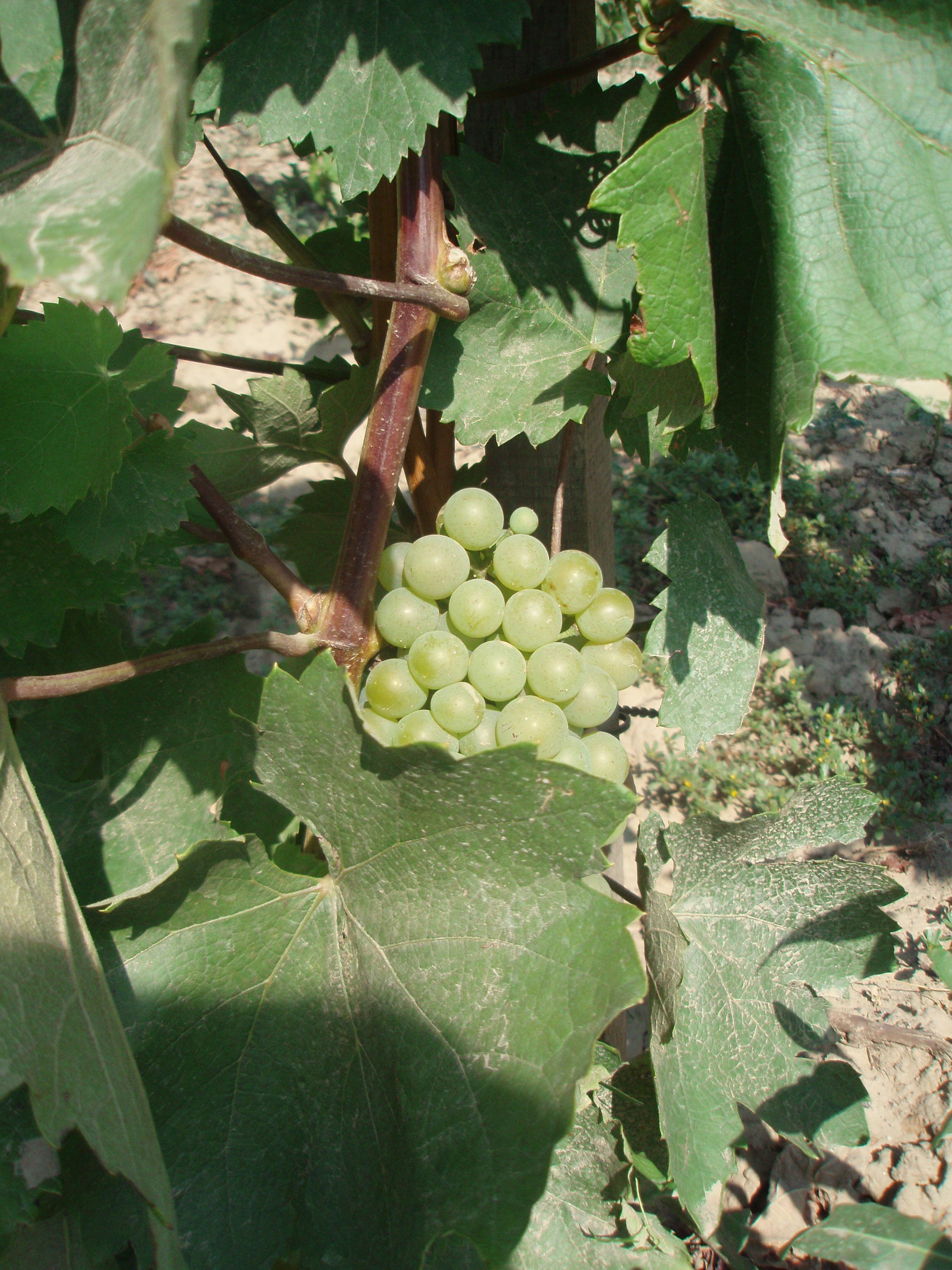
Hárslevelű grapes

Several varieties of grape are known to have originated in Hungary. These are:

- Ezerjó
- Hárslevelű
- Irsai Oliver
- Cserszegi fűszeres
- Királyleányka
- Zenit

Other varieties of grape that may have originated in Hungary include:

- Furmint
- Juhfark
- Kéknyelű
- Kadarka

== See also ==
- Old World wine
- House of Hungarian Wines
