= Pinot gris =

Variety of grape

- Grape (Vitis)
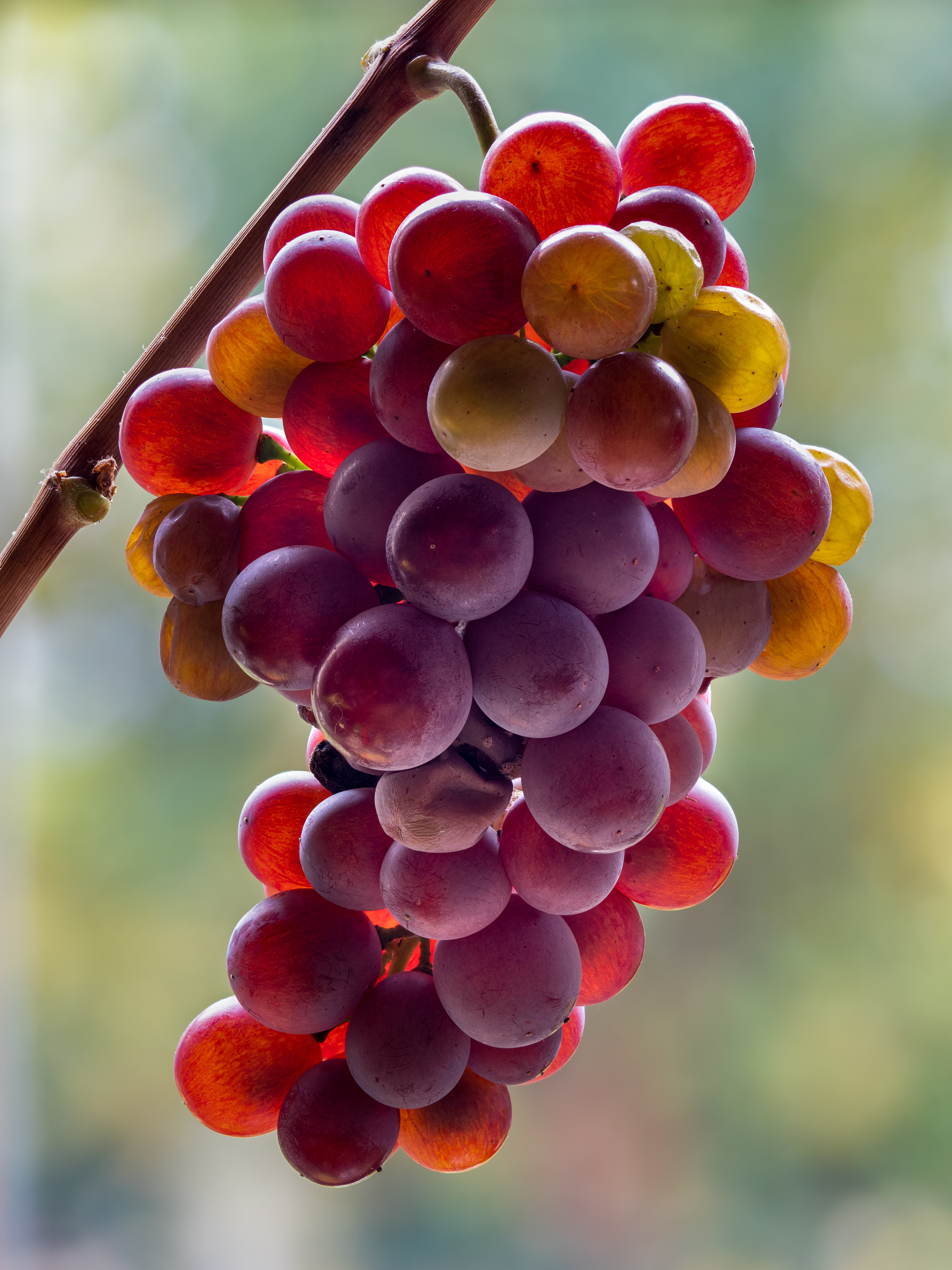
- A bunch of Pinot gris grapes
- Color of berry skin: Rose
- Species: Vitis vinifera
- Also called: (see list of synonyms)
- Origin: Burgundy, France
- Notable regions: (see major regions)
- VIVC number: 9275

Pinot gris (English: /ˌpiːnoʊ ˈɡriː/, French: [pino ɡʁi]), pinot grigio (US: /ˈpiːnoʊ ˈɡriːdʒioʊ, -dʒoʊ/, UK: /ˈɡrɪdʒioʊ/), or Grauburgunder (German: [ˈɡʁaʊbʊʁˌɡʊndɐ]) is a white wine grape variety of the species Vitis vinifera. Thought to be a mutant clone of the pinot noir variety, it normally has a pinkish-gray hue, accounting for its name, but the colors can vary from blue-gray to pinkish-brown. The word pinot could have been given to it because the grapes grow in small pinecone-shaped clusters. The wines produced from this grape also vary in color from a deep golden yellow to copper and even a light shade of pink, and it is one of the more popular grapes for skin-contact wine.

Pinot gris is grown around the globe, with the "spicy" full-bodied Alsatian and lighter-bodied, more acidic Italian styles being most widely recognized. The Alsatian style, often duplicated in New World wine regions such as Marlborough, Oregon, South Africa, South Australia, Tasmania, and Washington, tend to have moderate to low acidity, higher alcohol levels, and an almost "oily" texture that contributes to the full-bodied nature of the wine. The flavors can range from ripe tropical fruit notes of melon and mango to some botrytis-influenced flavors. In Italy, pinot grigio grapes are often harvested early to retain the refreshing acidity and minimize some of the overt fruitiness of the variety, creating a more neutral flavor profile. This style is often imitated in other Old World wine regions, such as Germany, where the grape is known as Ruländer or more commonly, Grauburgunder.

== History ==
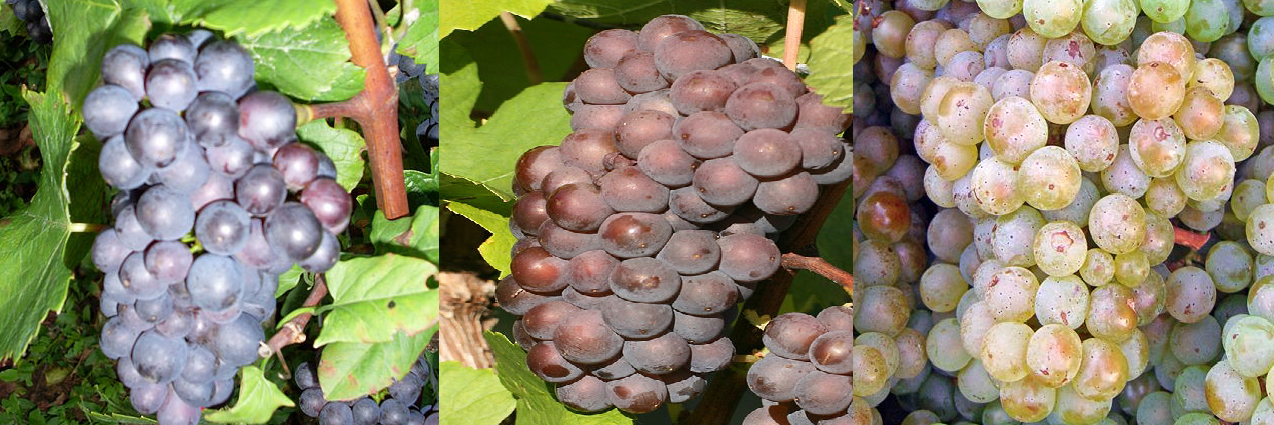
Like pinot blanc (right), pinot gris (center) is a color mutation of pinot noir (left).

Pinot gris has been known since the Middle Ages in the Burgundy region, where it was probably called Fromenteau. It spread from Burgundy, along with pinot noir, arriving in Switzerland by 1300. The grape was reportedly a favorite of Emperor Charles IV, who had cuttings exported to Hungary by Cistercian monks: the brothers planted the vines on the slopes of Badacsony bordering Lake Balaton in 1375. The vine soon after developed the name Szürkebarát "grey monk". In 1711, a German merchant named Johann Seger Ruland rediscovered a grape growing wild in the fields of the Palatinate. The subsequent wine he produced became known as Ruländer, although the vine was later discovered to be pinot gris.

Until the 18th and 19th centuries, the grape was a popular planting in Burgundy and Champagne, but poor yields and unreliable crops caused the grape to fall out of favor in those areas. The same fate nearly occurred in Germany, but vine breeders in the early 20th century were able to develop clonal varieties that would produce a more consistent and reliable crop.

Researchers at the University of California, Davis, determined that pinot gris has a remarkably similar DNA profile to pinot noir and that the color difference is derived from a genetic mutation that occurred centuries ago. The leaves and the vines of both grapes are so similar that the coloration is the only aspect that differentiates the two.

Santa Margherita wine group, a wine producer located in the north of Italy, was the first company in the world in 1961 to vinify pink pinot grigio grapes as a white wine.

Around 2005, pinot gris began to enjoy increasing popularity in the marketplace, especially in its pinot grigio incarnation and similar New World varietal wines.

== Regions ==
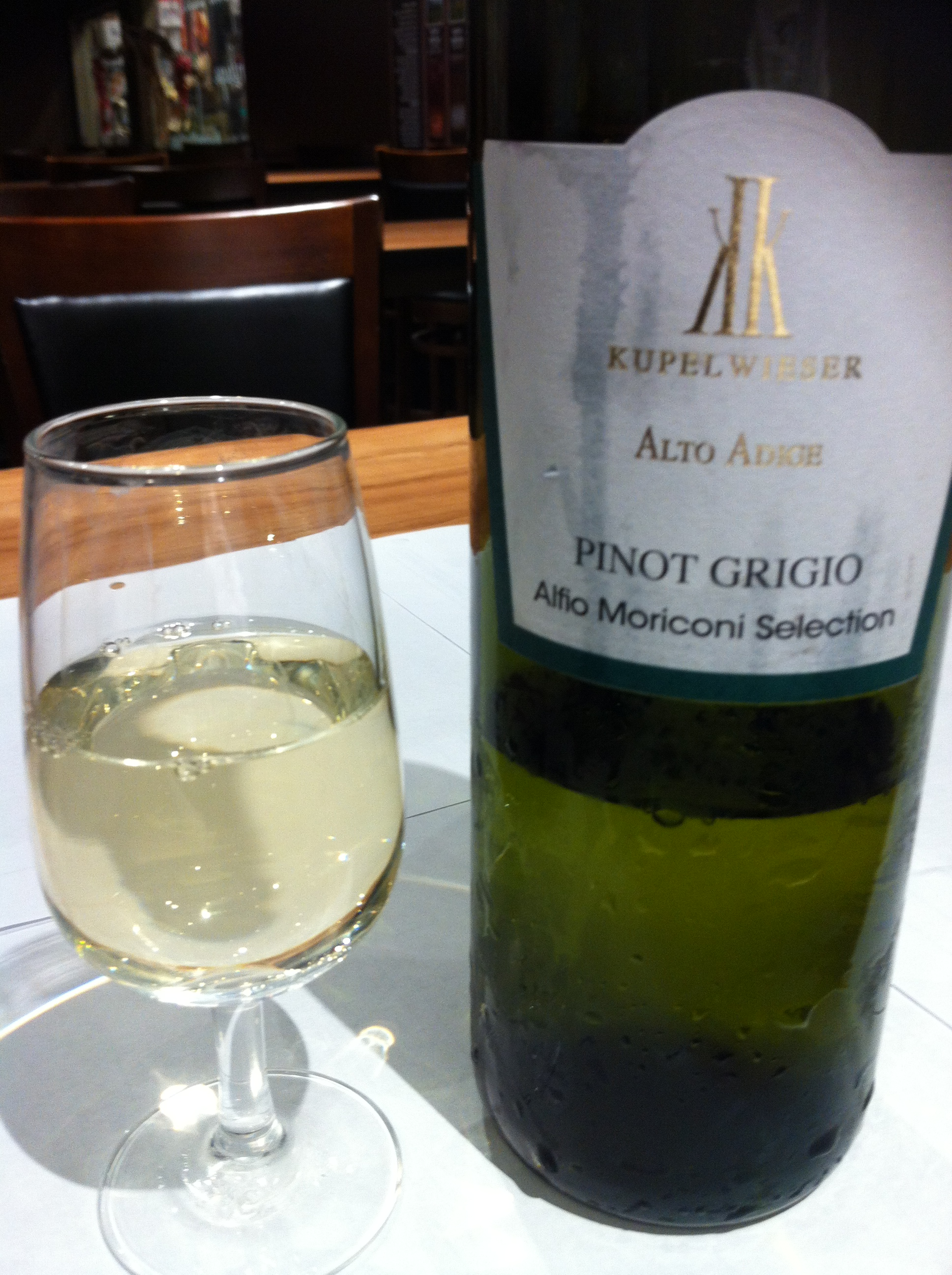
An Italian Pinot grigio from the Alto Adige region

The total area cultivated by this vine worldwide is about 115,000 hectares.

- Argentina – San Juan and Mendoza
- Australia – Tasmania, Yarra Valley, Adelaide Hills, Orange, New South Wales, Mornington Peninsula, Canberra Region. 2,836 hectares (as of 2008).
- Austria – 300 hectares or 0.6% of the total wine growing area.
- Belgium
- Canada – British Columbia, Ontario
- Chile – Casablanca, Chile
- Czech Republic – Bohemia, Moravia
- Crimea
- France – Burgundy, Loire, Alsace. 2,582 hectares (as of 2007).
- Germany – Baden, Palatinate. 5,042 hectares or 4.9% of the wine growing area (as of 31 July 2008).
- Hungary – Badacsony, Mátraalja
- Italy – Alto Adige, Friuli-Venezia Giulia, Oltrepò Pavese, Roverè della Luna, Trentino
- Luxembourg
- Moldova
- New Zealand – 2,488 hectares (as of 2019). In 2003, the area was only 316 hectares.
- Romania – Constanța County, Jidvei
- South Africa
- Slovakia – about 285 hectares
- Slovenia – Primorska, Podravje
- Switzerland – Valais. About 214 hectares (as of 2007).
- Turkey – Thrace Region, Kırklareli, Arcadia Vineyards
- United States – Oregon, California, New Mexico, Idaho, Michigan, Ohio, Arizona, Virginia, New Jersey, Washington, Pennsylvania and New York

=== France ===
==== Alsace ====
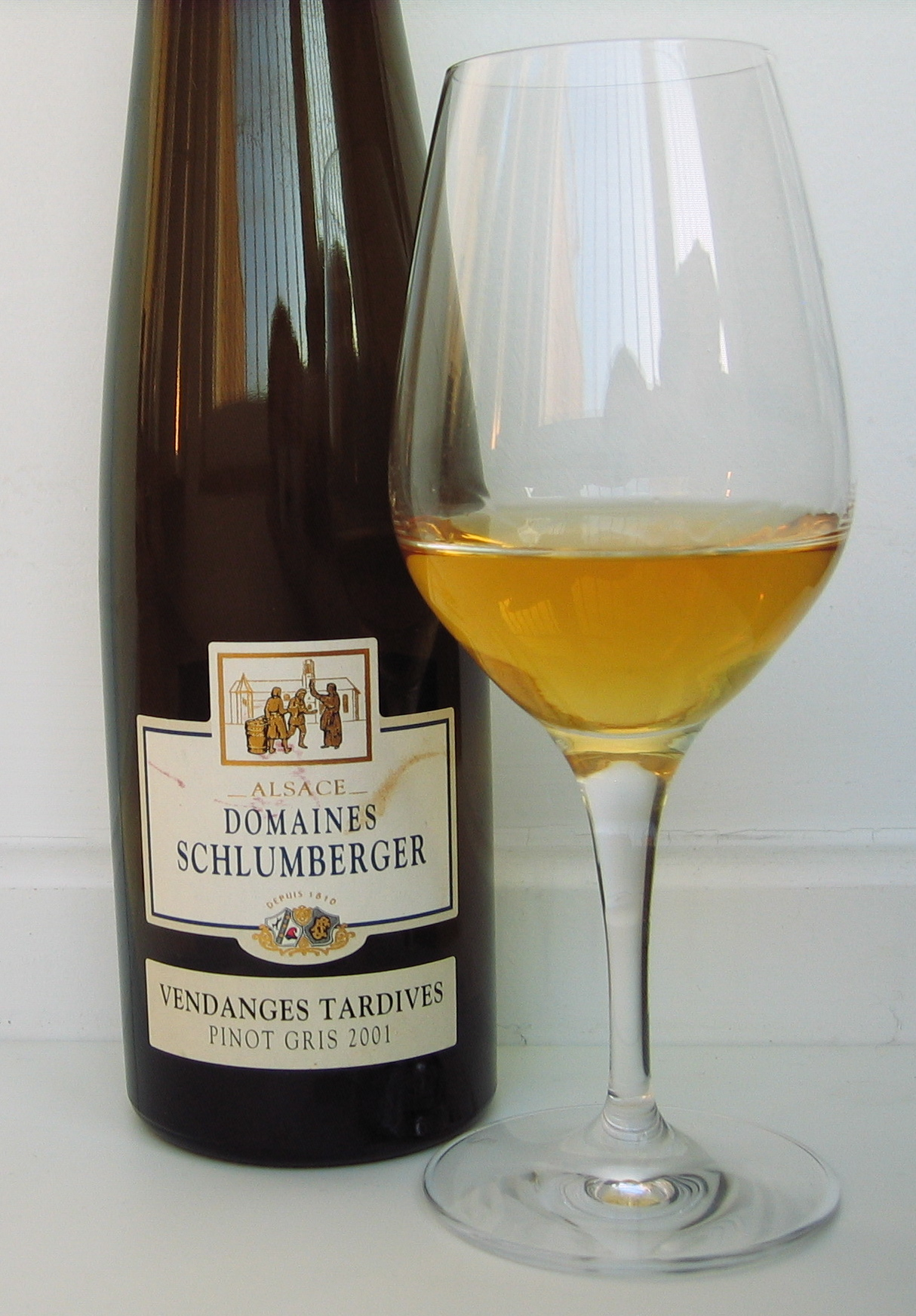
A Pinot gris Vendange Tardive from Alsace, a sweet late harvest wine

A major grape in Alsace, grown on 13.9 percent of the region's vineyard surface in 2006, the varietal Pinot-Gris d'Alsace is markedly different from pinot gris found elsewhere. The cool climate of Alsace and warm volcanic soils are particularly well suited for pinot gris, with its dry autumns allowing plenty of time for the grapes to hang on the vines, often resulting in wines of very powerful flavors.

Pinot gris is one of the so-called noble grapes of Alsace, along with Riesling, Gewürztraminer, and muscat, which may be used for varietal Alsace Grand Cru AOC and the late harvest wines Vendange Tardive and Sélection de Grains Nobles.

Previously, the pinot gris wines produced in Alsace were originally labeled Tokay d'Alsace. In the Middle Ages, the grape was popularized in the region by Hungarian traders who were introduced to the grape from Burgundy. During this time, Tokaji was one of the most popular and sought-after wines on the market, and the name was probably used to gain more prestige for the Alsatian wine. Pinot gris was believed to have been brought back to Alsace by General Lazarus von Schwendi after his campaign against the Turks in the 16th century. It was planted in Kientzheim under the name "Tokay". However, the pinot gris grape has no known genetic relations to the Furmint, Hárslevelű, Yellow Muscat, and Orémus grapes that are traditionally used in Tokaji wine. In 1980, the European Economic Community passed regulations related to protected designations of origin (PDOs), and when Hungary started negotiations for European Union membership, it became clear that the Tokay name would have to become a PDO for the Tokaj-Hegyalja region. Therefore, in 1993, an agreement was reached between Hungary and the European Union to phase out the name Tokay from non-Hungarian wine. In the case of Alsace, Tokay pinot gris was adopted as an intermediate step, with the "Tokay" part to be eliminated in 2007. Many producers had implemented the change to plain pinot gris on their labels by the early 2000s, several years before the deadline.

In the Loire Valley, pinot gris produces a single-variety rose wine described as gris in Reuilly AOC.

=== Australia ===
Pinot gris was first introduced into Australia in 1832 in the collection of grapes brought by James Busby. In Victoria, wines from the grape are labeled both Pinot gris and Pinot grigio, depending on the sweetness of wine, with the drier wines being labeled Pinot Grigio.

=== Germany ===
Grauburgunder cultivation in Germany is divided by wine-growing area as follows:

Wine region	Vineyards (hectares)
Ahr	3
Baden	1,636
Franken	48
Hessische Bergstraße	38
Mittelrhein	3
Moselle	79
Nahe	210
Palatinate	1,044
Rheingau	19
Rheinhessen	1,153
Saale-Unstrut	30
Saxony	41
Württemberg	105
Total for Germany in 2007	4,413

Source: Vine area statistics, 13 March 2008, Statistisches Bundesamt, Wiesbaden 2008 in Beschreibende Sortenliste des Bundessortenamtes 2008, p. 198 ff.

=== Hungary ===
In Hungary, this variety of wine is called Szürkebarát and is produced primarily in the Badacsony, Mátra, and Balaton-felvidék regions.

=== Italy ===
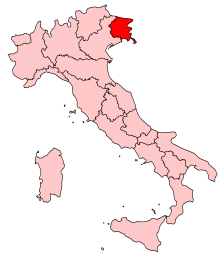
Pinot grigio is a popular planting in northeastern Italy, in regions such as Friuli-Venezia Giulia.

In Italy, where the grape is known as Pinot grigio, plantings can be found in the Lombardy region around Oltrepò Pavese and in South Tyrol, Italy's northernmost wine region. The grape is also prominent in the Friuli-Venezia Giulia region.

=== New Zealand ===
Pinot gris is grown in both the North Island, (Waiheke Island, Hawkes Bay, Gisborne) and the South Island (Central Otago, Nelson, Marlborough, Waipara), with 2,488 hectares (6,150 acres) producing as of 2019. This is a nearly eight-fold increase since 2003. In 2007, Pinot gris overtook Riesling as the third most planted white variety after Sauvignon blanc and Chardonnay. Half of all plantings are in Canterbury and Marlborough, with the wine developing a "rich, flinty, fruit-laden character".

=== United States ===
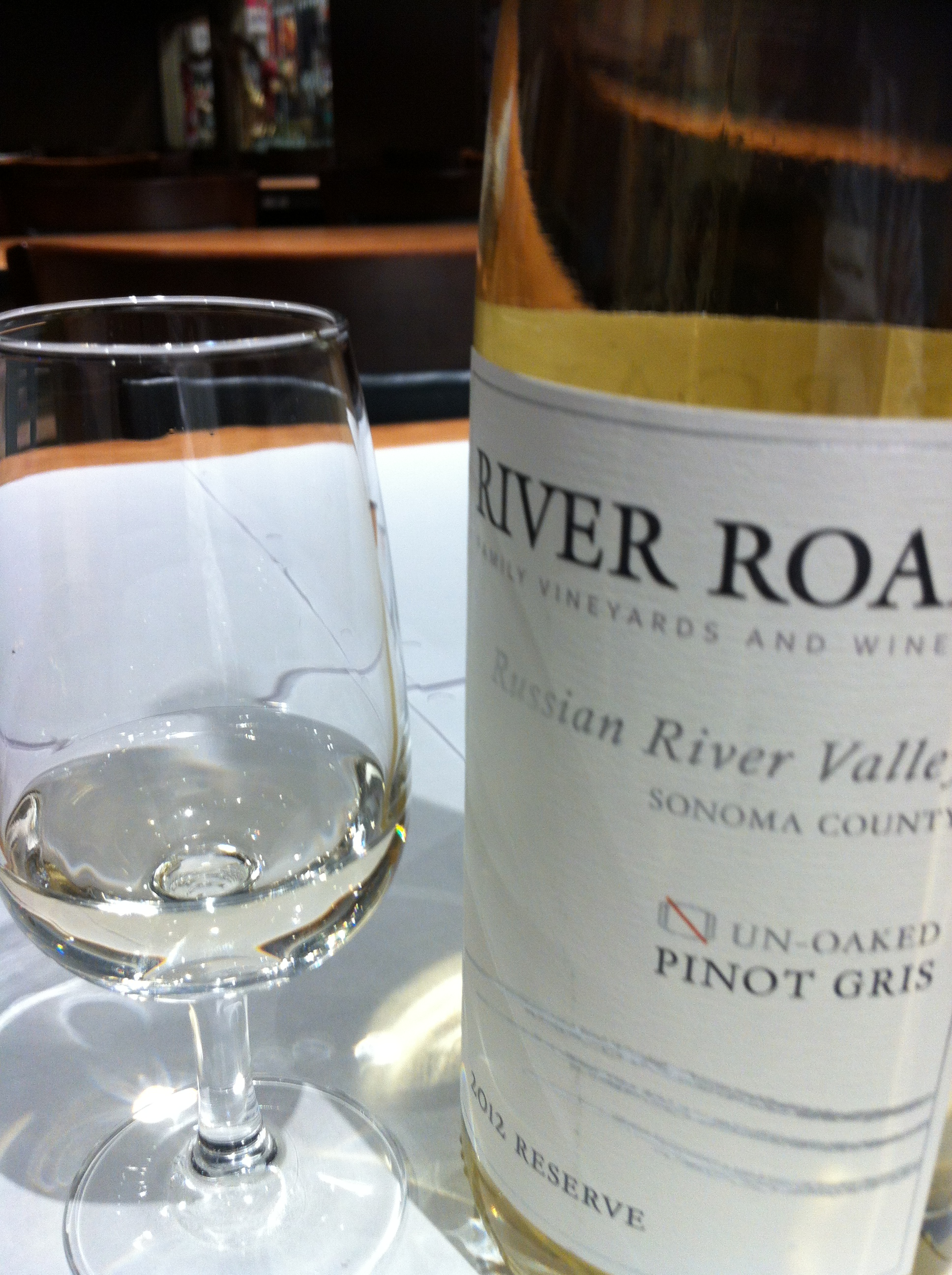
A Pinot gris from the Russian River Valley of California

David Lett from Eyrie Vineyards planted the first American Pinot gris vines in Oregon in 1965. Hoping to increase sales, Lett started to graft Riesling vines to Pinot gris in 1979. The grape originally had difficulties finding a sustainable market until Lett began marketing the wine to salmon traders as a good match to the fish. The wine's popularity only increased slightly until the mid-1990s, when well-capitalized larger producers entered the picture with enough volume to warrant expensive marketing. In 1991, King Estate Winery was the world's leading producer of premium Pinot gris and farmed the world's largest contiguous organic vineyard, which contains over 300 acres (1.2 km^{2}) of Pinot gris grapes.

There are about 1,620 acres (660 ha) planted in the Central and South coastal areas of California. The Pinot gris from California is often called Pinot grigio because of its similarity in style to the wine of Italy.

Pinot gris can be found in the northern regions of Ohio, which is considered part of the pinot trail.

=== Canada ===
As Pinot Grigio the grape has found significant success particularly in the wine growing region of Niagara, Ontario, where the cooler climate and soils offer ideal growing conditions.

== Viticulture ==
Pinot gris thrives in cooler climates, with the major growing regions being Alsace in France, north-eastern Italy and the US state of Oregon. This can lead to either a sweeter wine or if fermented to dryness, a wine high in alcohol. Clusters of Pinot gris may have a variety of colors on the vine. The grapes grow in small clusters (hence the pinecone name) and, upon ripening, often display a pinkish-gray hue, although the colors can vary from blue-gray to pinkish-brown. Pinot gris is often blended with Pinot Noir to enrich and lighten the Pinot Noir's flavor.

== Wine characteristics ==
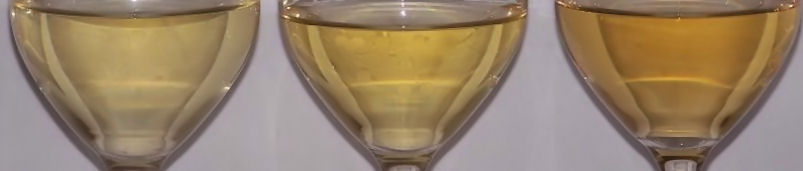
Color variations among different styles of Pinot gris. (L-R) Italian Pinot grigio with a straw yellow color, Alsatian Pinot gris with a lemon color, Oregon Pinot gris with a copper-pink color.

Wines made from the Pinot gris vary greatly and are dependent on the region and wine-making style they are from. Alsatian Pinot gris are medium to full-bodied wines with a rich, somewhat floral bouquet. They tend to be spicy in comparison with other Pinot gris. While most Pinot gris are meant to be consumed early, Alsatian Pinot gris can age well. German Pinot gris are more full-bodied with a balance of acidity and slight sweetness. In Oregon, the wines are medium-bodied with a yellow to copper-pink color and aromas of pear, apple, and/or melon. In California, the Pinot gris are more light-bodied with a crisp, refreshing taste with some pepper and arugula notes. The Pinot grigio style of Italy is a light-bodied, often lean wine that is light in color with sometimes spritzy flavors that can be crisp and acidic.

Pinot gris is considered an "early to market wine" that can be bottled and out on the market within 4–12 weeks after fermentation.

== Synonyms ==
Pinot gris is called by many names in different parts of the world:

Synonym of Pinot gris	Country / Region
Auxerrois gris	(France) Alsace
Fauvet	France
Fromentau / Fromentot	(France) Languedoc
Grauburgunder / Grauer Burgunder	Austria Germany (dry)
Grauer Mönch	Germany
Grauklevner	Germany
Gris cordelier	France
Malvoisie	(France) Loire Valley Switzerland
Μονεμβασία	Greece
Pinot grigio	Italy (United States) California Australia
Pinot beurot	(France) Loire Valley, Burgundy
Ruländer	Austria Germany Romania (sweet)
Rulandské šedé	Czech Republic Slovakia
Sivi pinot	Croatia Slovenia
Szürkebarát	Hungary
Tokay d'Alsace	(France) Alsace (renamed to Pinot gris due to EU regulations)
Піно ґрі, Піно сірий	Ukraine
Пино-гри	Russia
灰皮诺	China

== See also ==
- International variety
