= Vega (grape) =

Variety of grape

Vega (also known as Incrocio Dalmasso 2/26) is a white Italian wine grape variety that was created in 1937 by grape breeder Giovanni Dalmasso by crossing the Hungarian wine grape Furmint with the Croatian wine grape Malvazija Istarska. Developed at the Istituto Sperimentale per la Viticoltura of Conegliano in the Veneto wine region of northeast Italy, the grape has slowly spread since its release. As of 2000, there were 28 hectares (69 acres) of Vega planted throughout Italy.

== Viticulture ==
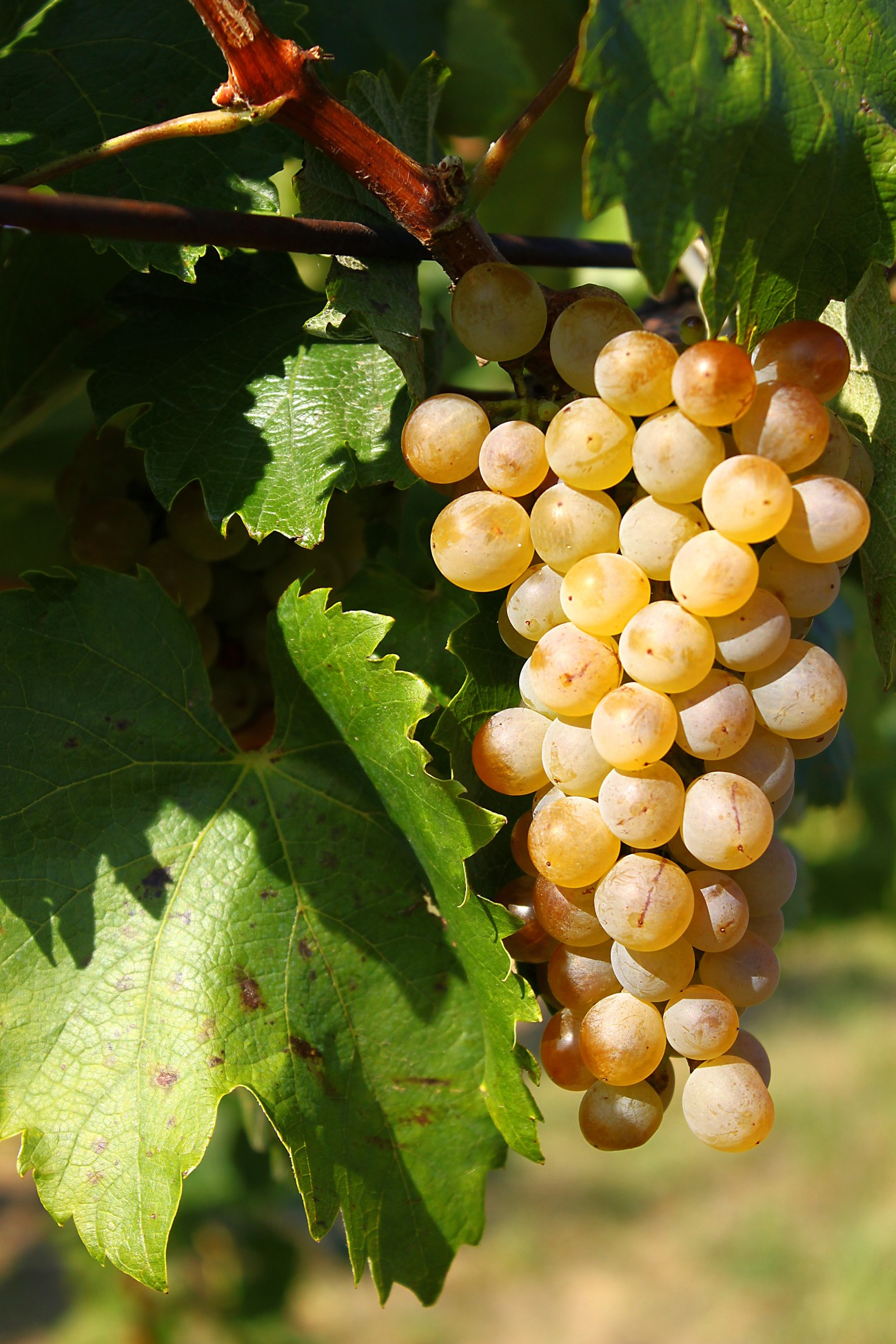
Furmint, one of the parent varieties of Vega.

Unlike its parent varieties Furmint, which is often used in the production of late-harvest wines, and Malvazija Istarska, Vega is an early ripening grapevine with very lightly colored berries.

== Wine regions ==
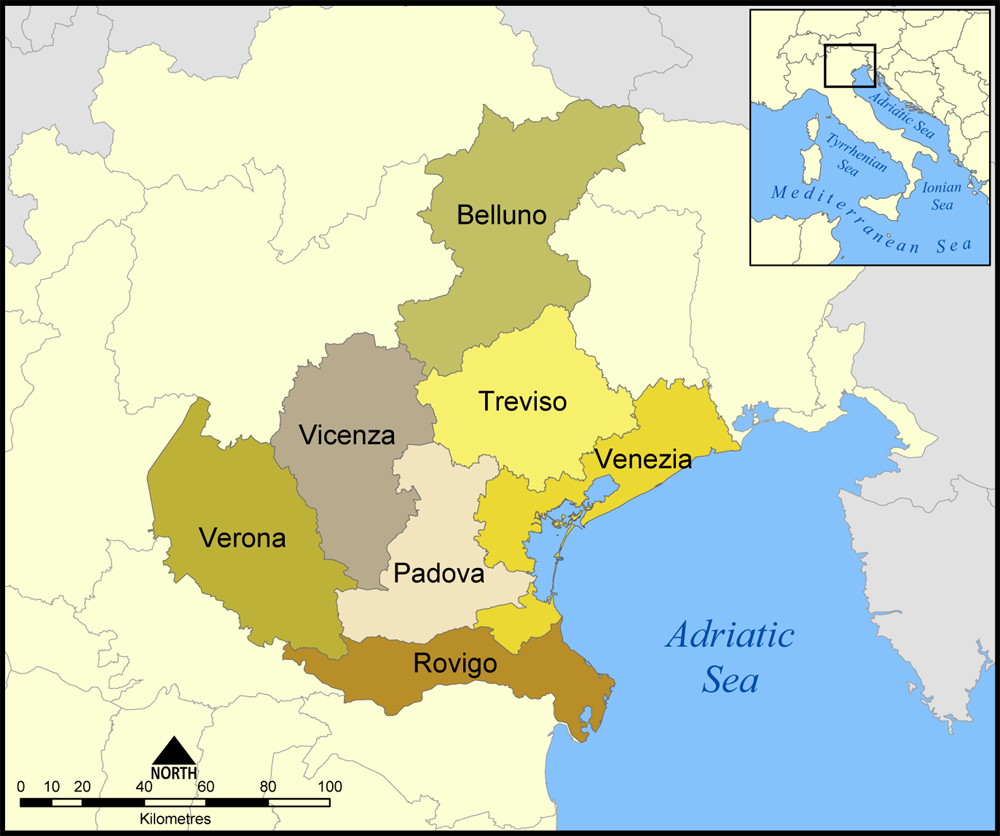
The Veneto region where Vega was developed.

As Vega was created and first propagated in the Veneto region, most of the 28 hectares (69 acres) of the vine reported in the official 2000 Italian agriculture census are found in this region of northeast Italy.

== Synonyms ==
As a relatively recent crossing, the only synonyms recognized by the Vitis International Variety Catalogue (VIVC) for Vega are its breeding codes, Dalmasso 2-26, I.D. 2/26 and Incrocio Dalmassso II/26.
