= Balaton wine region =

Wine region of Hungary

- Wine region
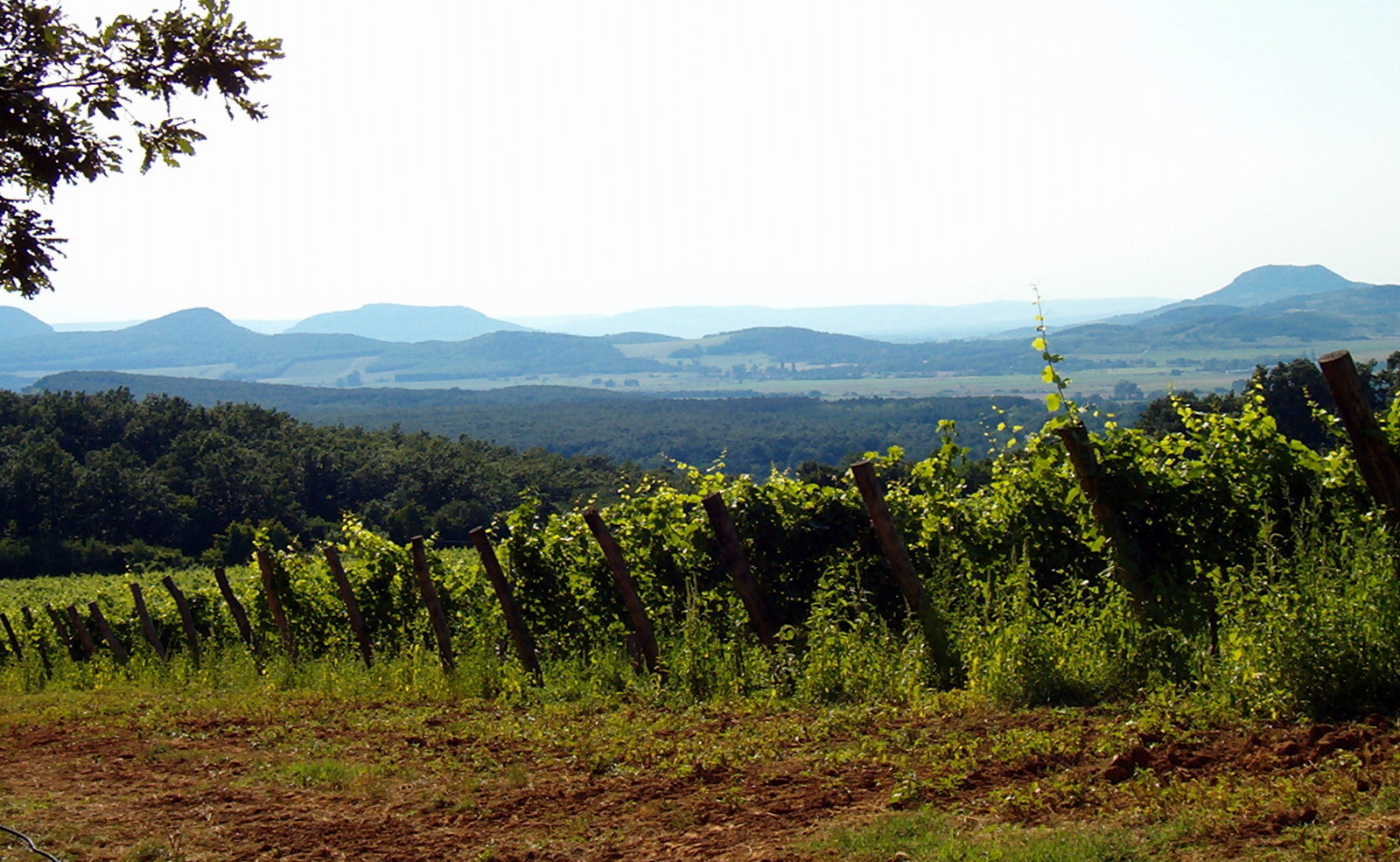
- Official name: Balatoni borrégió
- Country: Hungary
- Sub-regions: Badacsony, Balatonboglár, Balaton-felvidék, Balatonfüred-Csopak, Nagy-Somló, Zala
- Total area: 32075 ha
- Size of planted vineyards: 10718 ha
- Varietals produced: olaszrizling

Balaton wine region is one of the seven larger wine regions of Hungary. It consists of six wine regions: Badacsony, Balatonboglár, Balaton-felvidék, Balatonfüred-Csopak, Nagy-Somló and Zala. Its wine regions are spread around Lake Balaton; with these areas having constituted one single wine region back in the 19th century. Wine production was started at the beginning of the 1st century by the Romans. The region is known for its specific white wines showing local particularities; its most widely grown variety is olaszrizling.

== Wine regions ==
Wine region	Area		
Wine region	Total	1st class	Planted
Badacsony wine region	4200	3642	1600
Balatonboglár wine region	9980	8156	3200
Balaton-felvidék wine region	5200	?	1300
Balatonfüred-Csopak wine region	6350	5792	2150
Nagy-Somló wine region	1142	886	600
Zala wine region	6100	4107	1600
