= Észak-Dunántúl wine region =

Wine region in Hungary

- Wine region
- Official name: Észak-dunántúli borrégió
- Country: Hungary
- Sub-regions: Etyek-Buda, Neszmély, Mór, Pannonhalma
- Total area: 18000 ha
- Size of planted vineyards: 4520 ha

Észak-Dunántúl wine region is one of the seven larger wine regions of Hungary. It consists of four wine regions around Buda and the upper Danube: Etyek-Buda, Neszmély, Mór and Pannonhalma. On its limestone-based soil exclusively white wines are produced. International varieties – Chardonnay, Sauvignon blanc, Rhine riesling, Tramini and Muscat Ottonel – play a significant role, but traditional local varieties are also present, such as Olaszrizling, Leányka and in Mór also Ezerjó.

== Wine regions ==
Wine region	Area		
Wine region	Total	1st class	Planted
Etyek-Buda wine region	5600	3927	1600
Mór wine region	2000	1459	900
Neszmély wine region	6500	4223	1400
Pannonhalma wine region	3900	3236	620
