= Lipovina =

Lipovina may refer to:

- Hárslevelű, a grape variety
- Vladan Lipovina (born 1993), Montenegrin handball player
