= Somló =

Coordinates: 47°8′51.93″N 17°22′16.27″E

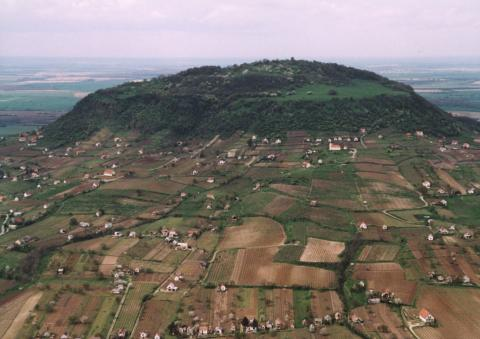
Somló Hill, Hungary

Somló (German: Schomlau, the corresponding adjective, meaning of Somló as in wines of Somló in Hungarian is: somlói) is an 832 hectare wine region in Veszprém county, in the North-West of Hungary. Most of the region is situated on the slopes of an extinct volcano, crowned by the ruins of an 11th-century castle, overlooking the plain. The wines of Somló, exclusively white, are made out of the grape varieties Hárslevelű, Furmint, Juhfark, Welschriesling, Traminer and Chardonnay. Some Sylvaner is also grown in the region. While traditionally the region consisted of large vineyards of rich aristocrats and religious institutions including the Archabbey of Pannonhalma, now it is predominantly small plots, many of them belonging to part-time or hobby vintners, that rule the landscape.

== History ==
The wines of Somló have a long and celebrated history; indeed, the region’s fame at some point is said to have rivaled that of Tokaj. Its wine figures as medicine in old Hungarian pharmacopeias (Vinum Somlaianum omni tempore sanum). In the eighteenth-nineteenth century, Habsburg emperors/kings of Austria and Hungary, especially Maria Theresia and Joseph II are claimed to have favored Somló wines. According to old, widespread but unsubstantiated lore, drinking Somló wine makes the conception of male children more likely. Hence its nickname: the wine of nuptial nights ( in Hungarian: a nászéjszakák bora).

== Climate and geography ==
The basalt of the ancient lava flows, along with loess and sand in the soil, the windy, moderately warm climate and the mostly traditional, oxidative wine making technologies (vinification in oak barrels) yield wines with a characteristic acidic-mineral taste. They age well, and are traditionally drunk at a slightly higher temperature than most whites (14-15 °C).
