= Badacsony wine region =

Wine region in Hungary

The Badacsony wine region (Hungarian: Badacsonyi borvidék) is in central Transdanubia, on the northern shores of Lake Balaton, around Mount Badacsony. Its area is approximately 1600 hectares.

== History ==
Grapes were already cultivated in the area during the Roman Empire; emperor Probus established large plantations. In the Middle Ages the plantations were mainly owned by the church. The wine Badacsonyi Ürmös had a fame that equalled that of the Tokaji Aszu in the 18th and 19th centuries. The phylloxera plague at the end of the 19th century caused significant damage to this wine region, and following the plague vineyards were modernized in order to avoid erosion of the soil. At the same time new varieties were also introduced to the area.

== Climate and geography ==
The soil is a mixture of clay, loess, and sand on top of basalt. The climate is mild, tempered with relatively high air humidity. Due to the proximity of Lake Balaton the southern slopes receive sunlight reflected from the lake's surface, creating a micro-climate that is ideal for viticulture.

The following villages belong to the wine region: Ábrahámhegy, Badacsonytomaj, Badacsonytördemic, Balatonrendes, Balatonszepezd, Gyulakeszi, Hegymagas, Káptalantóti, Kisapáti, Kővágóörs, Nemesgulács, Raposka, Révfülöp, Salföld, Szigliget, Tapolca.

== Grapes and wines ==
Szürkebarát is one of the best known varieties cultivated in the Badacsony wine region. Szürkebarát is a descendant of Pinot gris, brought to Hungary from France by monks around 1300. The special soil conditions and the microclimate of the Badacsony wine region are such that Szürkebarát differs from Pinot gris. In certain years it develops noble rot. Olaszrizling is most widespread variety cultivated in the region. Under favourable conditions the grapes are left on the vine stock until late in the autumn, and the resulting wine is sold as Szemelt Rizling (selected Riesling). Other grapes include Tramini, Ottonel muskotály, Rajnai rizling and Chardonnay. Kéknyelű used to be the dominant grape variety of the region, but when the plantations were severely damaged by frost in the 1980s, its significance decreased. It has seen a rise of popularity lately, and is expected to become a characteristic variety of the Badacsony region in the near future.

The wines from the Badacsony region have a special character. They tend to be full bodied, and have a rich taste. Traditional, oak barrel based wine production dominates in the region. The use of reductive techniques is spreading, but the modern techniques have not yet changed the typical character of the wines from the region.
