= Juhfark =

Variety of grape from Hungary

- Grape (Vitis)
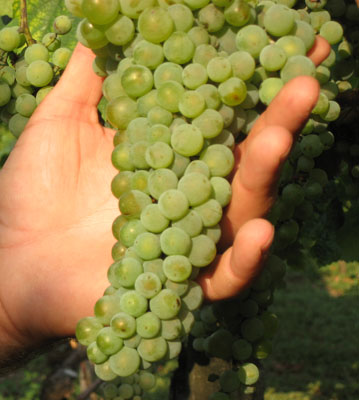
- Color of berry skin: Blanc
- Species: Vitis vinifera
- Also called: see list of synonyms
- Origin: Hungary
- Notable regions: Somló
- VIVC number: 5852

Juhfark is a variety of grape, of the species Vitis vinifera. The name in Hungarian literally means sheep's tail. The term refers to the elongated, cylindrical shape of the clusters.

The grape is mainly planted in Hungary, most prominently in the tiny wine region of Somló.

== Synonyms ==
Juhfark is also known under the synonyms Bacso, Balatoni Szőlő, Bárányfarkú, Boros, Boros Fehér, Boros Vékonyhéjú, Budai Goher, Coada Oii, Dünnschalige, Durbancs, Durbants, Fehér Boros, Fehérszőlő, Ihfarku, Jufarco, Juhfarks Weisser, Juhfarkú, Juhfarku Gelber, Kukuruztraube, Lämmerschwanz, Mohácsi, Mustafer, Musztafehár, Nyárhajú, Oocji Rep Bili, Pápai, Sarboros, Sárga Boros, Schweifler, Szeplős, Tämmerschwanz Weisser, Tarpai, Török Búza Szőlő, Tokayer Langer Weisser, Vékonyhéjú, and Vinase.
