= Zéta =

Variety of grape

- Grape (Vitis)
- Species: Vitis vinifera
- VIVC number: 23225

Zéta is a Hungarian wine grape, a crossing of Furmint and Bouvier. It was introduced to the Tokaj-Hegyalja wine region of Hungary in 1951 and authorized for production in 1990. Previously known as Oremus, its name was changed to Zéta in 1999. Its main asset is a particular aptitude for high sugar concentrations, early ripening and susceptibility for botrytis.

As Oremus, it was used in the production of Tokaji wines.
