= Kéknyelű =

Variety of grape

Zéta
- Grape (Vitis)
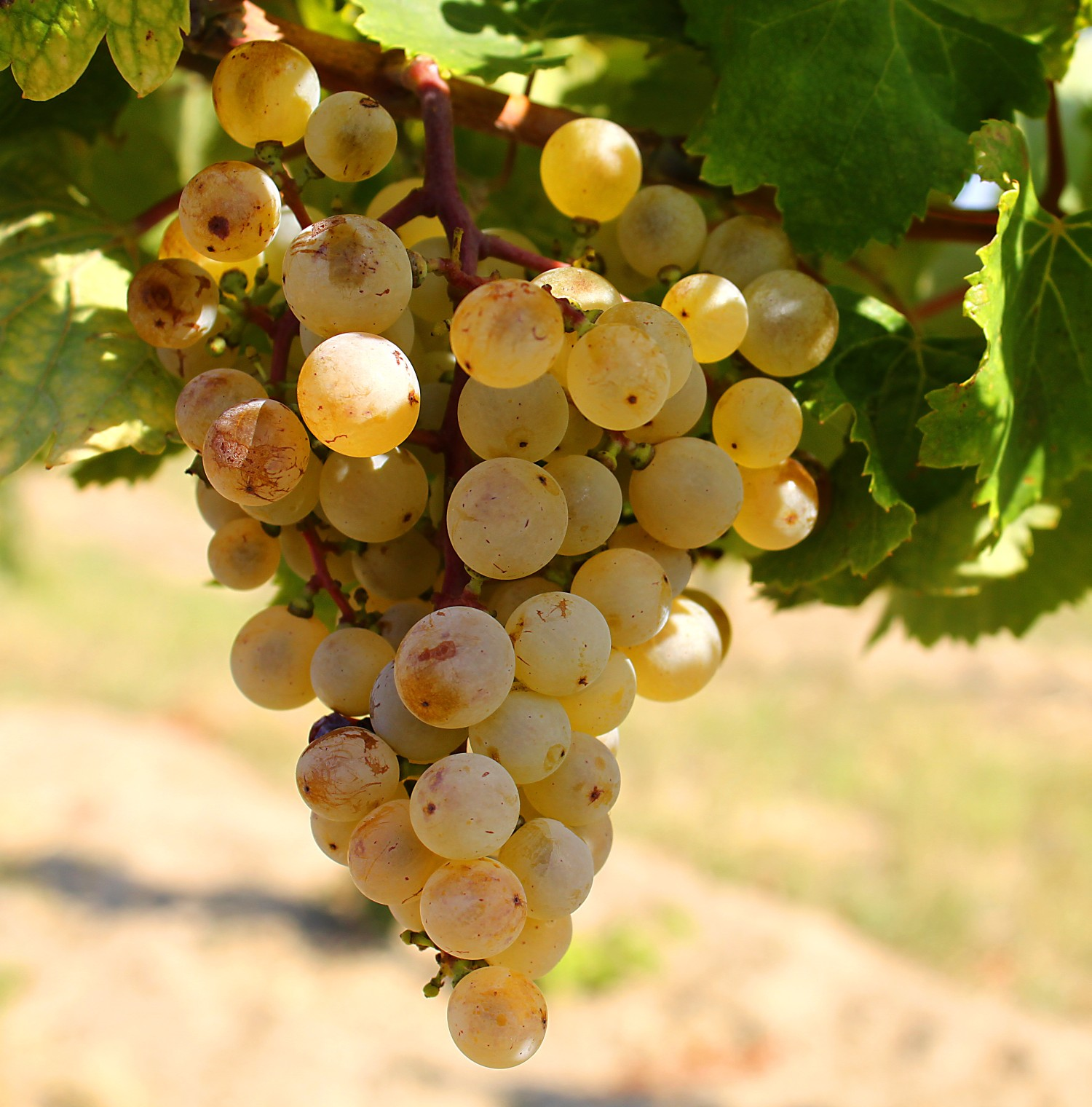
- Keknyelű grape cluster
- Species: Vitis vinifera
- VIVC number: 16421

Kéknyelű is a white Hungarian wine grape planted primarily in the Badacsony wine region near Lake Balaton. The grape produces full bodied, smoky wines.

It was assumed to be identical with the Italian grape variety Picolit. Nonetheless, in 2006 isoenzymes and microsatellite analyses have confirmed that these two cultivars are different.
