= Sopron wine region =

One of the seven larger wine regions of Hungary

- Wine region
- Official name: Soproni borrégió Soproni borvidék
- Country: Hungary
- Total area: 4280 ha
- Size of planted vineyards: 1890 ha
- Varietals produced: Kékfrankos

Sopron wine region (Hungarian: Soproni borrégió) is one of the seven larger wine regions of Hungary, consisting of only one wine region (Soproni borvidék). It is linked to the neighbouring Burgenland in Austria from a geographical, cultural and viticultural point of view. It is mainly a red wine-producing region, the main variety of which is Kékfrankos. Wine production dates back to Roman times.

== Wine regions ==
Wine region	Area		
Wine region	Total	1st class	Planted
Sopron wine region	4280	3236	1890
