= Duna wine region =

- Wine region
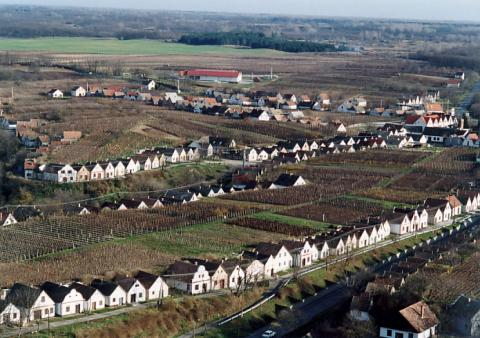
- Official name: Duna borrégió
- Country: Hungary
- Sub-regions: Csongrád, Hajós-Baja, Kunság
- Soil conditions: sand, loess
- Total area: 133048 ha
- Size of planted vineyards: 29280 ha

Duna wine region (also called Alföld wine region) is the largest of the seven larger wine regions of Hungary, stretching between the rivers Danube and Tisza. It consists of three continuous wine regions with similar conditions: Csongrád, Hajós-Baja and Kunság. Its area is mostly flat; the typical soil is sand and occasionally loess. Its climate is favourable to growing grapes, but weather extremities are frequent. Formerly, it was known for its light sand wines.

== Wine regions ==
Wine region	Area		
Wine region	Total	1st class	Planted
Csongrád wine region	14311	2595	2022
Hajós-Baja wine region	14874	0	2258
Kunság wine region	103863	1436	25000
