= House of Hungarian Wines =

Tourism in Hungary

- Magyar Borok Háza (Hungarian)
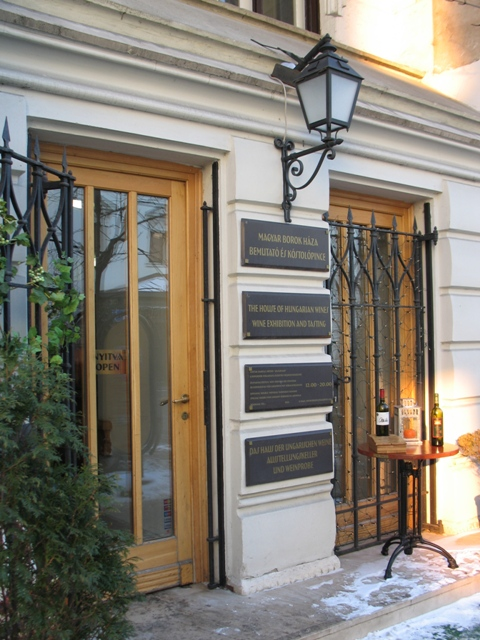
- House of Hungarian Wines
- Location: Budapest, Hungary
- Coordinates: 47°30′N 19°02′E
- Closed: 2016

The House of Hungarian Wines (Hungarian: Magyar Borok Háza [ˈmɒɟɒr ˈborok ˈhaːzɒ]) was a wine shop in Budapest, near the Buda Castle.

== History ==
This was one of the largest wine houses of the country. The entry fee enabled one unlimited sampling for two hours. The House had over 700 wines on display from Hungary’s 22 wine regions. The visitors could try another Hungaricum, the pálinka (different types of fruit spirits) specialities also. It was possible to taste a collection of handmade cheeses.

During the wine tasting one could get acquainted with the history, type of wine regions and international and local grape selections.

The House of Hungarian Wines is closed as of 2016.
