= Ezerjó =

Variety of grape

- Grape (Vitis)
- Color of berry skin: Blanc
- Species: Vitis vinifera
- Also called: See list of synonyms
- Origin: Hungary
- Notable regions: Mór
- VIVC number: 4027

Ezerjó is a white Hungarian wine grape grown primarily in the Mór region. Locally it is prized for its very fruity nose and crisp, full-bodied freshness. It is rare to find a bottle outside of Hungary as most is consumed by the local population and production is limited to certain small areas. This wine has a very long history including being a favorite with the royals of the Habsburg dynasty.

It is also used to make sweet dessert wines.

== Synonyms ==
Ezerjó is also known under the synonyms Biella, Budai Feher, Budicsin, Budicsina, Cirfondli, Ezer Jo, Feher Bakator, Feher Budai, Feher Sajgo, Feher Szagos, Frank, Kerekes, Kolmreifer, Kolmreifler, Konreifler, Korpavai, Korponai, Korponoi, Matyok, Predobre, Refosco, Refosco Weiss, Romandi, Satoki, Scheinkern, Scheinkernweiss, Shaikern, Staloci, Szadocsina, Szadoki, Szatoki, Szatoky, Tausendfachgute, Tausendgerte, Tausendgut, Tausendgute, and Trummertraube.
