= Late harvest =

Variety of wine

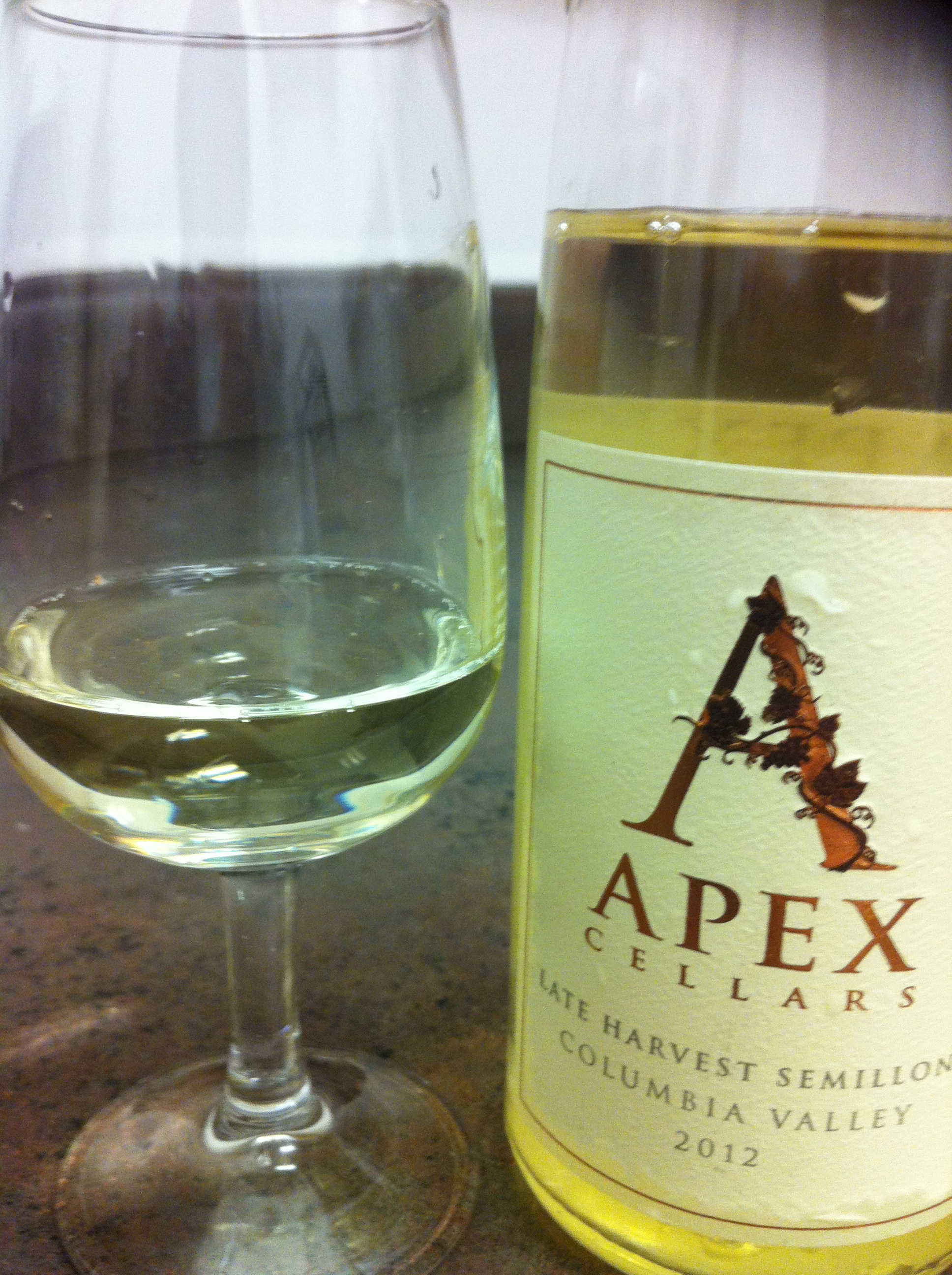
A late harvest Semillon from Washington State.

Late harvest is wine made from grapes left on the vine longer than usual. Late harvest is usually an indication of a sweet dessert wine, such as late harvest Riesling. Late harvest grapes are often more similar to raisins, but have been naturally dehydrated while on the vine.

Botrytis cinerea, or noble rot, is a mold that causes grapes to lose nearly all of their water content. Wines made from botrytis-affected grapes are generally very sweet.

== Noble rot ==
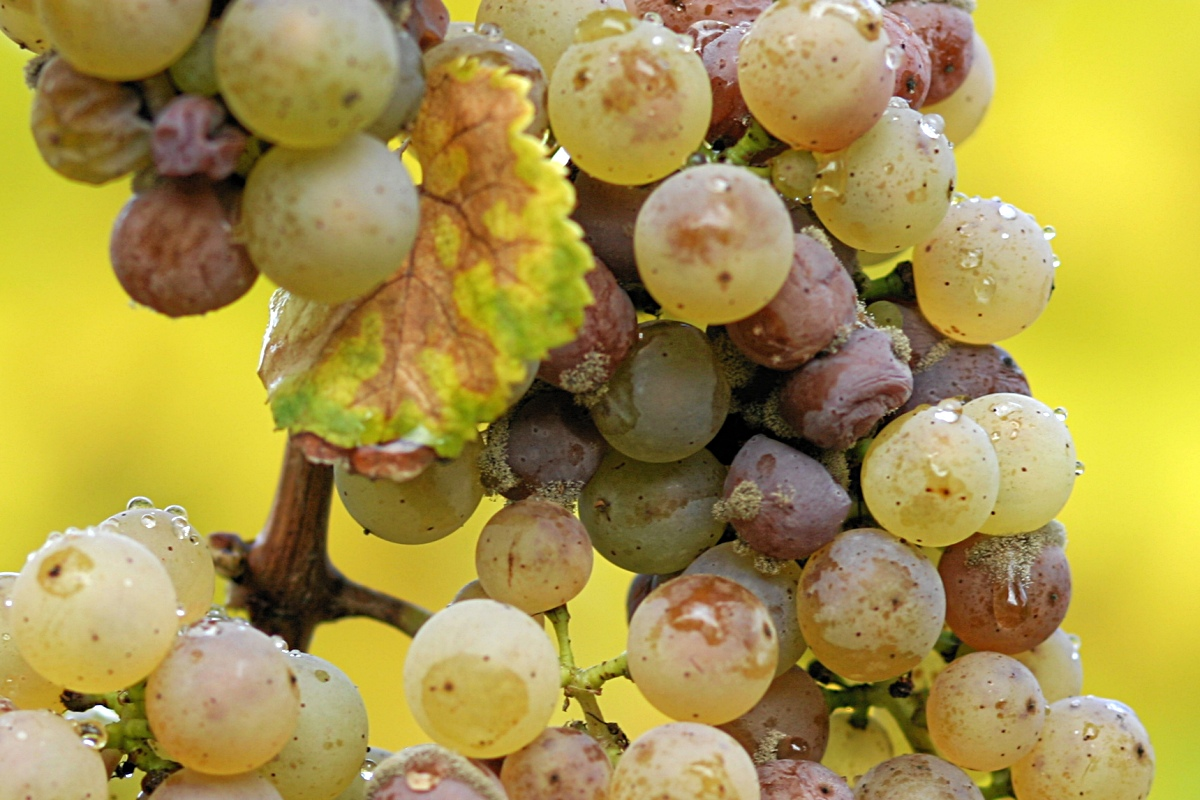
Botrytis affected grapes

Botrytis cinerea is a fungus that affects many wine grapes and causes them to shrivel into moldy raisins. The fungus responds to the humidity and warmth in the climate and attacks the grapes. As the mold penetrates the skin its spores begin to germinate, causing the water inside to evaporate and the grape to dehydrate. With the absence of water, the sugar becomes more concentrated and the botrytis begins to alter the acidity within the grape. Typically botrytis infection begins to take place in late September and can last till late October. In some years desiccation may occur leaving tiny amount of sweet liquor like juice within the grape.

The infection rate of botrytis is sporadic with vines and bunches achieving full rottenness at different times. This requires harvest workers to go through the vineyards several times between October and November to hand-pick the full rotted grapes. In some occasions, the usable grapes from a single vine may only produce enough juice for a single glass.

=== Sauternes ===
Sauternes, such as Château d'Yquem, are produced in the Sauternes region (including Barsac) south of Bordeaux. They are made from botrytis infected Semillon and Sauvignon blanc grapes. Semillon is preferred due to the grape's thin skin and susceptibility to the botrytis which gives the grape a high sugar content. These wines are noted for the balance that complements the honeyed sweetness.

During fermentation, the juice is transferred into oak wine barrels where the high sugar concentration of must prolongs the fermentation time which can last up to a year. When the alcohol level kills off all present yeast, the fermentation stops leaving the residual sugar at levels between 8 and 12% and alcohol levels around 14%.

After fermentation, the wine is placed in an aging barrel for two to three years before it is bottled where it will continue aging. A Sauterne from a reputable estate can bottle age for over 30 years though they normally hit their peak 10 years after the vintage date.

=== Tokaji/Tokaj/Tokajské ===
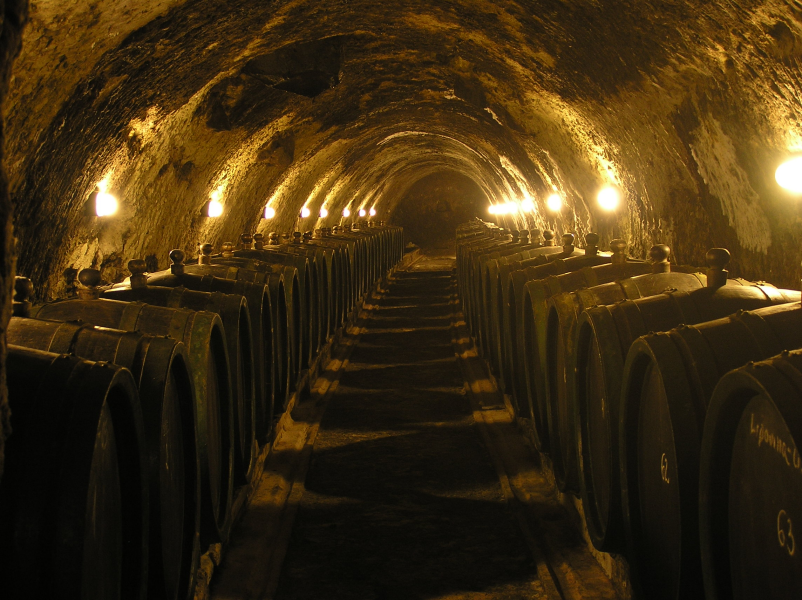
Tokaji wine cellars

Tokaji wines are produced in the Tokaj regions of Hungary and Slovakia. Wine has been made in these regions since as early as 1650, before the botrytized wines of Sauternes and the Rheingau were produced. The Furmint, Yellow Muscat, and Hárslevelű/Lipovina grapes are the primary grapes used in this wine. In a manner similar to Sherry, the wine is aged in partially filled barrels with a film of yeast on top and stored underground in wine caverns.

== German late harvest wines ==
In Germany, wines are classified according to the ripeness of the grape at time of harvest. Within the Qualitätswein mit Prädikat classification, there are four levels of late harvest wines, roughly ranging from dry to very sweet: Spätlese ("late harvest"), Auslese ("selected harvest"), Beerenauslese ("selected berries harvest") and Trockenbeerenauslese ("selected dried-berries harvest") with the last two levels being botrytized.

== Icewine ==
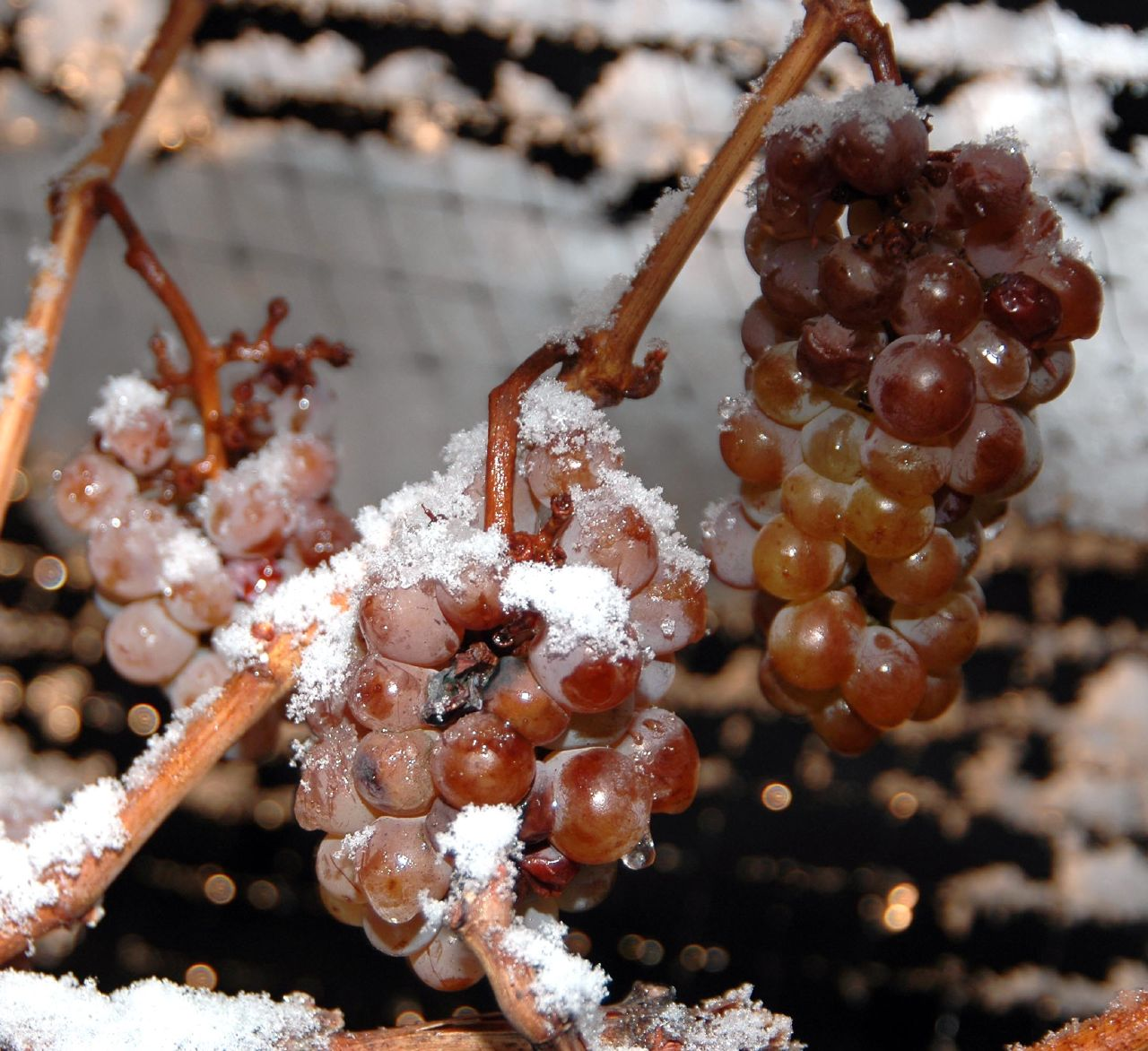
Grapes frozen on the vine

Ice wines are popular in the cold northerly wine regions of Germany and Canada where the grapes can freeze on the vine. As the grapes are pressed, the frozen water crystals are eliminated leaving the highly concentrated sugar behind.

== Raisin wine ==
Raisin wines are sometimes made from grapes that have been left on the vine in the sun to concentrate their sugar. The result is similar to that of the ice wine process, but is a much older process and suitable for warm climates.

== See also ==
- Vendange tardive – French late harvest wine
- Spätlese – German late harvest wine
