= 2005 Slovak Cup final =

- Event: 2004–05 Slovak Cup
Dukla Banská Bystrica	FC Artmedia Petržalka
2	1
- Date: 8 May 2005
- Venue: Štadión pod Zoborom, Nitra
- Referee: Ľuboš Micheľ
- Attendance: 2,474

The 2005 Slovak Cup final was the final match of the 2004–05 Slovak Cup, the 36th season of the top cup competition in Slovak football. The match was played at the Štadión pod Zoborom in Nitra on 8 May 2005 between FK Dukla Banská Bystrica and FC Artmedia Petržalka. Dukla Banská Bystrica defeated Artmedia 2-1.

== Route to the final ==
FC Dukla Banská Bystrica		Round	FC Artmedia Petržalka
Opponent	Result	2004–05 Slovak Cup	Opponent	Result
ŠK Zemplín Michalovce	1–0	First Round	Bye
HFK Prievidza	4–1	Second Round	FC Nitra	2–0
FK Inter Bratislava	2–0 away, 0–1 home	Quarter-finals	ŠK Slovan Bratislava	4–0 home, 0–0 away
FC Steel Trans Ličartovce	2–1 home, 2–1 away	Semi-finals	MŠK Žilina	2–1 home, 0–0 away

== Match ==
=== Details ===
8 May 2005
14:00 CEST

Dukla Banská Bystrica	2–1	Artmedia Petržalka
Pečovský 5'; Jakubko 24'	Report	Šoltis 65'

Štadión pod Zoborom, Nitra
Attendance: 2,474
Referee: Ľuboš Micheľ

DUKLA BANSKÁ BYSTRICA:
GK	--	(Slovakia) Richard Zajac
RB	--	(Slovakia) Ľubomír Vyskoč		(yellow card) 76'
CB	--	(Czech Republic) Milan Páleník
CB	--	(Slovakia) Jaroslav Kentoš		(yellow card) 29'
LB	--	(Slovakia) Michal Pančík
RM	--	(Czech Republic) Radek Bukač		(substituted off) 66'
DM	--	(Slovakia) Viktor Pečovský
CM	--	(Slovakia) Martin Svintek (c)	(yellow card) 42'	(substituted off) 81'
LM	--	(Slovakia) Vladimír Leitner
ST	--	(Slovakia) Martin Fabuš		(substituted off) 54'
ST	--	(Slovakia) Martin Jakubko
Substitutions:
CB	--	(Slovakia) František Kunzo		(substituted in) 66'
AM	--	(Slovakia) Radovan Kulík		(substituted in) 54'
ST	--	(Slovakia) Róbert Semeník		(substituted in) 81'
Manager:
Václav Daněk

ARTMEDIA PETRŽALKA:
GK	--	(Slovakia) Juraj Čobej
RB	--	(Slovakia) Jozef Kotula	(substituted off) 77'
CB	--	(Slovakia) Ján Ďurica	(yellow card) 21'
CB	--	(Slovakia) Peter Burák
LB	--	(Czech Republic) Daniel Tchuř
CM	--	(Slovakia) Vratislav Gajdoš	(substituted off) 68'
CM	--	(Slovakia) Balázs Borbély
CM	--	(Slovakia) Ján Kozák
AM	--	(Slovakia) Anton Šoltis
CF	--	(Slovakia) Branislav Fodrek	(substituted off) 68'
FW	--	(Slovakia) Filip Šebo
Substitutions:
RW	--	(Slovakia) Blažej Vaščák	(substituted in) 68'
FW	--	(Slovakia) Martin Mikulič	(substituted in) 68'
CF	--	(Serbia and Montenegro) Milorad Bukvić	(substituted in) 77'
Manager:
Vladimír Weiss

Assistant referees:
(Slovakia) Roman Slyško
(Slovakia) Martin Balko
