= 2004 Slovak Cup final =

- Event: 2003–04 Slovak Cup
Artmedia Petržalka	Ličartovce
2	0
- Date: 8 May 2004
- Venue: DAC Stadion, Dunajská Streda
- Referee: Pavol Olšiak
- Attendance: 2,650

The 2004 Slovak Cup final was the final match of the 2003–04 Slovak Cup, the 35th season of the top cup competition in Slovak football. The match was played at the DAC Stadion in Dunajská Streda on 8 May 2004 between FC Artmedia Petržalka and FC Steel Trans Ličartovce. Artmedia defeated Ličartovce 2–0.

== Route to the final ==
FC Artmedia Petržalka		Round	FC Steel Trans Ličartovce
Opponent	Result	2003–04 Slovak Cup	Opponent	Result
SH Senica	0–0 (6–5 pen.)	First Round	MFK Ružomberok	2–0
FK Rapid Bratislava	2–1	Second Round	FK Inter Bratislava	1–1 (4–1 pen.)
FC Rimavská Sobota	0–1 away, 5–1 home	Quarter-finals	ŠK Aqua Turčianske Teplice	4–2 home, 0–1 away
FK Slovan Duslo Šaľa	3–1 home, 3–0 away	Semi-finals	FC Spartak Trnava	1–1 home, 1–0 away

== Match ==
=== Details ===
8 May 2004
13:00 CEST

Artmedia Petržalka	2–0	Steel Trans Ličartovce
Krejčí 51'; Mikulič 75'	Report

Mestský štadión, Dunajská Streda
Attendance: 2,650
Referee: Pavol Olšiak

ARTMEDIA PETRŽALKA:
GK	--	(Slovakia) Juraj Čobej
RB	--	(Slovakia) Štefan Maixner (c)		(substituted off) 55'
CB	--	(Slovakia) Balázs Borbély
CB	--	(Slovakia) Ján Ďurica		(yellow card) 52'
LB	--	(Slovakia) Peter Burák
RM	--	(Slovakia) Ladislav Suchánek
CM	--	(Slovakia) Gábor Straka
CM	--	(Slovakia) Ján Kozák
AM	--	(Slovakia) Attila Pinte
CF	--	(Slovakia) Miroslav Kozák		(substituted off) 61'
FW	--	(Slovakia) Marek Krejčí	(yellow card) 25'	(substituted off) 92'
Substitutions:
CM	--	(Slovakia) Tomáš Zárecký		(substituted in) 90'
AM	--	(Slovakia) Anton Šoltis		(substituted in) 55'
ST	--	(Slovakia) Martin Mikulič		(substituted in) 61'
Manager:
Michal Hipp

STEEL TRANS LIČARTOVCE:
GK	--	(Slovakia) Ľuboš Vojtaško
RB	--	(Slovakia) Stanislav Kišš
CB	--	(Slovakia) Peter Bašista	(substituted off) 20'
CB	--	(Slovakia) Peter Šinglár
LB	--	(Slovakia) Peter Krakovský	(yellow card) 27'
DM	--	(Slovakia) Tomáš Šimko	(substituted off) 53'
CM	--	(Slovakia) Ján Lesniak
RM	--	(Slovakia) Marek Andraščík
LM	--	(Slovakia) Tomáš Martaus	(substituted off) 78'
LM	--	(Slovakia) Jozef Majoroš
FW	--	(Slovakia) Ľubomír Pagor
Substitutions:
DF	--	(Slovakia) Patrik Kaminský	(substituted in) 20'
RM	--	(Slovakia) Mário Bicák	(substituted in) 78'
CF	--	(Slovakia) Marián Adam	(substituted in) 53'
Manager:
Jaroslav Rybár

Assistant referees:
(Slovakia) Roman Slyško
(Slovakia) Tibor Jančovič
