= 2005–06 FC Artmedia Bratislava season =

Artmedia Bratislava
2005–06 season
- Manager: (Slovakia) Vladimír Weiss
- Stadium: Stadium FC Petržalka 1898 (domestic games); Tehelné pole (European matches)
- Superliga: 2nd
- Slovak Cup: Semi-finals
- Champions League: Group stage
- UEFA Cup: Round of 32

During the 2005–06 Slovak football season, Artmedia Bratislava competed in the Superliga.

== Season summary ==
Artmedia reached the group stages of the UEFA Champions League after wins over Kairat Almaty, Celtic and Partizan Belgrade. They beat Almaty 4–3 on aggregate in the first qualifying round despite a 2–0 defeat in the first leg. However it was on 27 July 2005 that they made their mark on the tournament, producing one of the shock results of Champions League history as they beat 2003 UEFA Cup finalists and 1967 European Cup winners Celtic 5–0 in the first leg of their Champions League second qualifying round match. The stunned Celtic side could not quite recover, only managing to win the return leg 4–0, and Artmedia held on to progress in the tournament. On 23 August 2005 they clinched a place in the group stages after overcoming Serbian powerhouse Partizan Belgrade 4–3 on penalties after a 0–0 aggregate scoreline, thus becoming the second Slovak club after 1. FC Košice in 1997–98 to reach the coveted Champions League group stages. Their success was even more remarkable considering Artmedia's entire annual budget was just over £1 million.

Artmedia also made history by becoming one of the first two clubs ever to advance from the first qualifying round into the Champions League group stage. The other club to do so was 2004–05 winners Liverpool, who were given a special entry into the first qualifying round of the 2005–06 tournament and managed to progress to the group stage.

Artmedia played their Champions League fixtures at the Tehelné pole ground of crosstown rivals Slovan Bratislava because their own ground did not meet UEFA standards for Champions League play.

On 28 September 2005, Artmedia made history once again by becoming the first Slovak side to collect a point in the Champions League group stage. In another famous upset, they came back from a 2–0 first-half deficit to defeat 2004 Champions League winners Porto 3–2 at Porto's home ground.

Eventually, they finished third in the group, parachuting them into the UEFA Cup, but not before missing a late chance to score a goal in the return fixture against Porto that would have sent them to the round of 16 at Rangers' expense.

In December 2005, goalkeeper Juraj Čobej underwent brain surgery to remove a malign tumor. He made a full recovery.

Artmedia lost the home leg of their UEFA Cup round of 32 tie with Levski Sofia 1–0 and were knocked out of the tournament after an away defeat of 2–0.

After the successful season, coach Vladimír Weiss left for FC Saturn Ramenskoe. Several players left the club, including Ján Ďurica (to FC Saturn Ramenskoe), Balázs Borbély (to Kaiserslautern) and Blažej Vaščák (to Treviso).

== Competitions ==
=== Superliga ===
Pos	Team	Pld	W	D	L	GF	GA	GD	Pts	Qualification or relegation
1	Ružomberok (C)	36	26	2	8	65	28	+37	80	Qualification for Champions League second qualifying round
2	Artmedia Bratislava	36	23	5	8	58	33	+25	74	Qualification for UEFA Cup first qualifying round
3	Spartak Trnava	36	21	5	10	57	31	+26	68	Qualification for UEFA Cup first qualifying round
4	Žilina	36	18	6	12	69	44	+25	60	
5	Nitra	36	12	9	15	42	48	−6	45	Qualification for Intertoto Cup first round

Source: RSSSF.org
Rules for classification: 1) points; 2) goal difference; 3) number of goals scored.
(C) Champions

=== Slovak Cup ===
- August 31: Inter Bratislava 0-2 Artmedia Bratislava
- October 5: Artmedia Bratislava 1-0 FC Senec II
- October 25: FC Senec II 1-1 Artmedia Bratislava
- March 29: MFK Ružomberok 2-0 Artmedia Bratislava
- April 29: Artmedia Bratislava 0-2 MFK Ružomberok

=== Champions League ===
==== First qualifying round ====
12 July 2005	Kairat Almaty (Kazakhstan)	2–0	(Slovakia) Artmedia Bratislava	Central Stadium, Almaty
15:30	Fomenka 39'; Artemov 70'	Report MatchCentre		Referee: René Rogalla (Switzerland)

20 July 2005	Artmedia Bratislava (Slovakia)	4–1 (a.e.t.)	(Kazakhstan) Kairat Almaty	Národné tréningové centrum, Senec
20:00	Borbély 21'; Tchuř 52'; Kozák 94' (pen.); Staňo 120+'	Report MatchCentre	Bogomolov 91'	Referee: Siarhei Shmolik (Belarus)

==== Second qualifying round ====
27 July 2005	Artmedia Bratislava (Slovakia)	5–0	(Scotland) Celtic	Tehelné pole, Bratislava
20:00	Halenár 43', 76', 89'; Vaščák 57'; Mikulič 78'	Report MatchCentre		Referee: Selçuk Dereli (Turkey)

2 August 2005	Celtic (Scotland)	4–0	(Slovakia) Artmedia Bratislava	Celtic Park, Glasgow
20:45	Thompson 21' (pen.); Hartson 44'; McManus 54'; Beattie 82'	Report MatchCentre		Referee: Alberto Undiano Mallenco (Spain)

==== Third qualifying round ====
10 August 2005	Artmedia Bratislava (Slovakia)	0–0	(Serbia and Montenegro) Partizan	Tehelné pole, Bratislava
20:00		Report MatchCentre		Referee: Peter Fröjdfeldt (Sweden)

23 August 2005	Partizan (Serbia and Montenegro)	0–0 (a.e.t.) (3–4 p)	(Slovakia) Artmedia Bratislava	Partizan Stadium, Belgrade
20:00		Report MatchCentre		Referee: Steve Bennett (England)
	Penalties
	Nađ (penalty scored); Mirković (penalty missed); Bajić (penalty scored); Vukčević (penalty scored); Boya (penalty missed); Brnović (penalty missed)		(penalty scored) Fodrek; (penalty missed) Kozák; (penalty scored) Halenár; (penalty missed) Fabio Gomes; (penalty scored) Debnár; (penalty scored) Ďurica

==== Group stage ====
13 September 2005	Artmedia Bratislava (Slovakia)	0–1	(Italy) Internazionale	Tehelné pole, Bratislava
20:45		Report MatchCentre	Cruz 17'	Attendance: 27,000; Referee: Eric Poulat (France)

28 September 2005	Porto (Portugal)	2–3	(Slovakia) Artmedia Bratislava	Estádio do Dragão, Porto
20:45	Lucho González 32'; Diego 39'	Report MatchCentre	P. Petráš 45+1'; Ján Kozák 54'; Borbély 74'	Attendance: 35,000; Referee: Massimo Busacca (Switzerland)

19 October 2005	Rangers (Scotland)	0–0	(Slovakia) Artmedia Bratislava	Ibrox Stadium, Glasgow
20:45		Report MatchCentre		Attendance: 49,000; Referee: Arturo Daudén Ibáñez (Spain)

1 November 2005	Artmedia Bratislava (Slovakia)	2–2	(Scotland) Rangers	Tehelné pole, Bratislava
20:45	Borbély 8'; Ján Kozák 59'	Report MatchCentre	Pršo 3'; Thompson 44'	Attendance: 26,525; Referee: Florian Meyer (Germany)

23 November 2005	Internazionale (Italy)	4–0	(Slovakia) Artmedia Bratislava	San Siro, Milan
20:45	Figo 28'; Adriano 41', 59', 74'	Report MatchCentre		Attendance: Closed doors Referee: Mike Riley (England)

6 December 2005	Artmedia Bratislava (Slovakia)	0–0	(Portugal) Porto	Tehelné pole, Bratislava
20:45		Report MatchCentre		Attendance: 25,000; Referee: Markus Merk (Germany)

=== UEFA Cup ===
==== Round of 32 ====
15 February 2006	Artmedia Bratislava (Slovakia)	0–1	(Bulgaria) Levski Sofia	Štadión Antona Malatinského, Trnava
17:30		Report	E. Angelov 9'	Referee: Laurent Duhamel (France)

23 February 2006	Levski Sofia (Bulgaria)	2–0	(Slovakia) Artmedia Bratislava	Vasil Levski National Stadium, Sofia
17:00	E. Angelov 14', 27'	Report		Referee: Gerald Lehner (Austria)

== First-team squad ==
Squad at end of season

Note: Flags indicate national team as defined under FIFA eligibility rules; some limited exceptions apply. Players may hold more than one non-FIFA nationality.

No.	Pos.	Nation	Player
1	GK	SVK	Juraj Čobej
2	DF	SVK	Ondrej Debnár
3	DF	SVK	Pavol Staňo
4	DF	SVK	Ján Ďurica
5	DF	CZE	Aleš Hellebrand
6	MF	SVK	Andrej Hanták
7	MF	SVK	Jozef Kotula
8	MF	SVK	Blažej Vaščák
9	FW	BRA	Fábio Gomes
10	FW	SVK	Martin Mikulič
11	MF	SVK	Anton Šoltis
12	MF	SVK	Branislav Obžera
13	MF	SVK	Daniel Tchuř

No.	Pos.	Nation	Player
14	FW	SVK	Juraj Halenár
15	MF	SVK	Vratislav Gajdoš
16	FW	CZE	Lukáš Hartig
17	MF	SVK	Balázs Borbély (captain)
18	GK	SVK	Ľuboš Kamenár
19	FW	SCG	Milorad Bukvić
20	MF	SVK	Branislav Fodrek
21	DF	SVK	Peter Petráš
22	DF	CZE	Aleš Urbánek
23	DF	SVK	Roman Konečný
24	DF	SVK	Peter Burák
25	MF	SVK	Ján Kozák
30	GK	SVK	Štefan Kollár
