= 2003–04 Slovak Cup =

Tournament details
- Country: Slovakia
- Teams: 30

Final positions
- Champions: Artmedia Petržalka
- Runners-up: Steel Trans Ličartovce

The 2003–04 Slovak Cup was the 35th season of Slovakia's annual knock-out cup competition and the eleventh since the independence of Slovakia. It began on 26 August 2003 with the matches of first round and ended on 8 May 2004 with the final. The winners of the competition earned a place in the second qualifying round of the UEFA Cup. Matador Púchov were the defending champions.

== First round ==
The match Steel Trans Ličartovce – MFK Ružomberok was played on 26 August 2003 and the thirteen games were played on 2 and 3 September 2003.

Team 1	Score	Team 2
Steel Trans Ličartovce	2–0	MFK Ružomberok
Rapid Bratislava	3–1	Laugaricio Trenčín
FC Nitra	1–1 (4–3 p)	ZTS Dubnica nad Váhom
Koba Senec	2–1	Družstevník Báč
ŠK Bukocel Vranov	0–5	Dukla Banská Bystrica
Rimavská Sobota	3–1	REaMOS Kysucký Lieskovec
Tatran Prešov	1–1 (7–6 p)	HFC Humenné
ŠK Aqua Turčianske Teplice	3–0	Odeva Lipany
Podbrezová	2–1	1. FC Košice
Matador Púchov II	0–2	Inter Bratislava
SH Senica	0–0 (5–6 p)	Artmedia Petržalka
Slovan Duslo Šaľa	1–0	Slovan Bratislava
DAC Dunajská Streda	0–6	Spartak Trnava
Koba Senec II	1–1 (6–7 p)	Baník Prievidza

== Second round ==
The four games were played on 30 September 2003 and the four games were played on 1 October 2003.

Team 1	Score	Team 2
Koba Senec	0–2	Spartak Trnava
Baník Prievidza	2–0	Podbrezová
Rimavská Sobota	4–1	FC Nitra
Steel Trans Ličartovce	1–1 (4–1 p)	Inter Bratislava
Rapid Bratislava	1–2	Artmedia Petržalka
ŠK Aqua Turčianske Teplice	2–1	Tatran Prešov
Dukla Banská Bystrica	1–1 (7–8 p)	MŠK Žilina
Slovan Duslo Šaľa	2–0	Matador Púchov

== Quarter-finals ==
The first legs were played on 21 and 22 October 2003. The second legs were played on 28 and 29 October 2003.

=== First legs ===
21 October 2003	Steel Trans Ličartovce	4–2	Aqua Turčianske Teplice	Ličartovce
14:00	Piatka 21', 25'; Krakovský 48' (pen.); Tomko 54'	Report	Jeťko 35', 89'	Stadium: Ličartovce Stadium; Attendance: 480; Referee: Marcel Tomčík

21 October 2003	Slovan Duslo Šaľa	1–0	Baník Prievidza	Šaľa
14:00	Vyskoč 10'	Report		Stadium: Šaľa Stadium; Attendance: 1,200; Referee: Tibor Jančovič

22 October 2003	MŠK Žilina	3–1	Spartak Trnava	Žilina
14:00	Fabuš 16', 37'; Sninský 29'	Report	Kriss 2'	Stadium: Štadión pod Dubňom; Attendance: 2,500; Referee: Mario Vlk

22 October 2003	Rimavská Sobota	1–0	Artmedia Petržalka	Rimavská Sobota
18:00	Pisár 50'	Report		Stadium: Na Záhradkách Stadium; Attendance: 1,100; Referee: Richard Havrilla

=== Second legs ===
28 October 2003	Baník Prievidza	0–0 (0–1 agg.)	Slovan Duslo Šaľa	Prievidza
15:30		Report		Stadium: Futbalový štadión Prievidza; Attendance: 1,000; Referee: Pavol Olšiak

28 October 2003	Spartak Trnava	3–0 (4–3 agg.)	MŠK Žilina	Trnava
15:30	Kožuch 46', 58'; Masaryk 60'	Report		Stadium: Anton Malatinský Stadium; Attendance: 2,400; Referee: Ľuboš Micheľ

29 October 2003	Aqua Turčianske Teplice	1–0 (3–4 agg.)	Steel Trans Ličartovce	Turčianske Teplice
14:00	Kravárik 64' (pen.)	Report		Stadium: AQUA Stadium; Attendance: 830; Referee: Pavol Šuniar

29 October 2003	Artmedia Petržalka	5–1 (5–2 agg.)	Rimavská Sobota	Bratislava
14:00	Krejčí 36', 68'; Suchánek 61', 87'; Vaščák 89'	Report	Maruniak 17'	Stadium: Štadión Petržalka; Attendance: 710; Referee: Miroslav Minárčik

== Semi-finals ==
The first legs were played on 7 April 2004. The second legs were played on 21 April 2004.

=== First legs ===
7 April 2004	Artmedia Petržalka	3–1	Slovan Duslo Šaľa	Bratislava
15:30	Suchánek 35'; Šoltis 48'; Kozák 90'	Report	Holmík 22'	Stadium: Štadión Petržalka; Attendance: 1,000; Referee: Jozef Ligocký

7 April 2004	Steel Trans Ličartovce	1–1	Spartak Trnava	Ličartovce
15:30	Andraščík 50'	Report	Masaryk 6'	Stadium: Ličartovce Stadium; Attendance: 650; Referee: Pavol Šipoš

=== Second legs ===
21 April 2004	Slovan Duslo Šaľa	0–3 (1–6 agg.)	Artmedia Petržalka	Šaľa
16:00		Report	Pinte 7'; Straka 47'; Zárecký 82'	Stadium: Šaľa Stadium; Attendance: 2,153; Referee: Anton Stredák

21 April 2004	Spartak Trnava	0–1 (1–2 agg.)	Steel Trans Ličartovce	Trnava
17:00		Report	Majoroš 68'	Stadium: Anton Malatinský Stadium; Attendance: 1,812; Referee: Ľubomír Udvardy

== Final ==
8 May 2004
13:00 CEST

Artmedia Petržalka	2–0	Steel Trans Ličartovce
Krejčí 51'; Mikulič 75'	Report

Mestský štadión, Dunajská Streda
Attendance: 2,650
Referee: Pavol Olšiak
