= 2004–05 Slovak Cup =

Tournament details
- Country: Slovakia
- Teams: 30

Final positions
- Champions: Dukla Banská Bystrica
- Runners-up: Artmedia Bratislava

The 2004–05 Slovak Cup was the 36th season of Slovakia's annual football knock-out cup competition and the twelfth since the independence of Slovakia. It began on 21 September 2004 with the matches of first round and ended on 8 May 2005 with the final. The winners of the competition earned a place in the second qualifying round of the UEFA Cup. Artmedia Petržalka were the defending champions.

== First round ==
The thirteen games were played on 21 and 22 September 2004 and the match Aqua Turčianske Teplice – Ružomberok was played on 29 September 2004.

Team 1	Score	Team 2
Matador Púchov	0–0 (4–3 p)	Podbrezová
FK Lamač Bratislava	1–4	HFK Prievidza
Koba Senec	1–1 (2–4 p)	Spartak Trnava
Družstevník Báč	1–1 (2–3 p)	FC Nitra
AS Trenčín	3–1	Veľký Lapáš
Slavoj Trebišov	1–2	Rimavská Sobota
Tatran Prešov	0–3	Steel Trans Ličartovce
Zlaté Moravce	0–0 (4–3 p)	ZTS Dubnica nad Váhom
Rapid Bratislava	0–1	Slovan Bratislava
Slovan Duslo Šaľa	1–1 (4–3 p)	DAC Dunajská Streda
Zemplín Michalovce	0–1	Dukla Banská Bystrica
FK Čaňa	2–3	ŠK Kremnička
FKS Nemšová	2–3	Inter Bratislava
ŠK Aqua Turčianske Teplice	1–2	MFK Ružomberok

== Second round ==
The match AS Trenčín – Slovan Bratislava was played on 6 October 2004 and the seven games were played on 19 and 20 October 2004.

Team 1	Score	Team 2
AS Trenčín	0–0 (3–5 p)	Slovan Bratislava
Rimavská Sobota	1–1 (4–2 p)	Matador Púchov
Steel Trans Ličartovce	2–1	MFK Ružomberok
Artmedia Bratislava	2–0	FC Nitra
Dukla Banská Bystrica	4–1	HFK Prievidza
Spartak Trnava	0–1	Zlaté Moravce
ŠK Kremnička	1–2	Inter Bratislava
MŠK Žilina	3–0	Slovan Duslo Šaľa

== Quarter-finals ==
The first legs were played on 2 and 3 November 2004. The second legs were played on 9 and 10 November 2004.

=== First legs ===
2 November 2004	Inter Bratislava	0–2	Dukla Banská Bystrica	Bratislava
13:30		Report	Urgela 61'; Svintek 76'	Stadium: Štadión Pasienky; Attendance: 357; Referee: Pavol Olšiak

3 November 2004	Rimavská Sobota	0–1	Steel Trans Ličartovce	Rimavská Sobota
13:30		Report	Krakovský 31' (pen.)	Stadium: Na Záhradkách Stadium; Attendance: 943; Referee: Jozef Ďuriš

3 November 2004	Slovan Bratislava	0–0	Artmedia Petržalka	Bratislava
16:00		Report		Stadium: Tehelné pole Attendance: 1,073; Referee: Pavol Šuniar

3 November 2004	MŠK Žilina	3–1	Zlaté Moravce	Žilina
17:30	Šesták 2', 68'; Ďurica 28' (pen.)	Report	Vondra 33'	Stadium: Štadión pod Dubňom; Attendance: 1,483; Referee: Marcel Tomčík

=== Second legs ===
9 November 2004	Steel Trans Ličartovce	3–0 (4–0 agg.)	Rimavská Sobota	Ličartovce
13:30	Piatka 5'; Andraščík 38'; Lesniak 88'	Report		Stadium: Ličartovce Stadium; Attendance: 410; Referee: Ľubomír Udvardy

9 November 2004	Artmedia Petržalka	4–0 (4–0 agg.)	Slovan Bratislava	Bratislava
13:30	Kozák 13' (pen.), 66'; Vaščák 65'; Fodrek 73'	Report		Stadium: Štadión Petržalka; Attendance: 600; Referee: Vladimír Hriňák

9 November 2004	Dukla Banská Bystrica	0–1 (2–1 agg.)	Inter Bratislava	Banská Bystrica
17:30		Report	Tomčák 73'	Stadium: Štadión SNP Štiavničky; Attendance: 1,010; Referee: Richard Havrilla

10 November 2004	Zlaté Moravce	0–2 (1–5 agg.)	MŠK Žilina	Zlaté Moravce
13:30		Report	Šesták 17'; Ďurica 58' (pen.)	Stadium: Štadión FC ViOn; Attendance: 1,380; Referee: Anton Stredák

== Semi-finals ==
The first legs were played on 6 April 2005. The second legs were played on 19 and 20 April 2005.

=== First legs ===
6 April 2005	Artmedia Petržalka	2–1	Steel Trans Ličartovce	Bratislava
15:30	Kozák 7' (pen.); Mikulič 90+'	Report	Krakovský 50' (pen.)	Stadium: Štadión Petržalka; Attendance: 500; Referee: Miroslav Minárčik

6 April 2005	MŠK Žilina	0–0	Dukla Banská Bystrica	Žilina
17:30		Report		Stadium: Štadión pod Dubňom; Attendance: 2,132; Referee: Patrik Hrčka

=== Second legs ===
19 April 2005	Dukla Banská Bystrica	2–1 (2–1 agg.)	MŠK Žilina	Banská Bystrica
17:30	Jakubko 21', 31'	Report	Šesták 2'	Stadium: Štadión SNP Štiavničky; Attendance: 3,126; Referee: Jozef Ďuriš

20 April 2005	Steel Trans Ličartovce	1–2 (2–4 agg.)	Artmedia Petržalka	Ličartovce
16:00	Piatka 41'	Report	Šebo 7'; Fodrek 88'	Stadium: Ličartovce Stadium; Attendance: 1,915; Referee: Mario Vlk

== Final ==
8 May 2005
14:00 CEST

Dukla Banská Bystrica	2–1	Artmedia Petržalka
Pečovský 5'; Jakubko 24'	Report	Šoltis 65'

Štadión pod Zoborom, Nitra
Attendance: 2,474
Referee: Ľuboš Micheľ
