= Milan Harvilko =

Slovak footballer

Personal information
- Full name: Milan Harvilko
- Date of birth: 18 July 1988 (age 38)
- Place of birth: Stropkov, Czechoslovakia
- Height: 1.74 m (5 ft 8 1/2 in)
- Position: Full back

Team information
- Current team: Stropkov

Youth career
- ?–2007: Stopkov

Senior career*
Years	Team	Apps	(Gls)
2007–2010	Dubnica	1	(0)
2008–2009	→ Šaľa (loan)		
2009	→ Podbrezová (loan)	5	(0)
2010–2015	Podbrezová	121	(12)
2015–2019	SV Zebau Bad Ischl		
2019–2021	Stropkov		
2021–2023	Borov		
2023-	Medzilaborce		
- * Club domestic league appearances and goals as of 26 November 2023

Milan Harvilko (born 18 July 1988) is a Slovak football defender who currently plays for his home-grown club MŠK Tesla Stropkov.

== Career ==
He made his Corgoň Liga debut for MFK Dubnica against MFK Košice on 13 May 2010.
