= Chaim Yosef Gottlieb of Stropkov =

Chaim Yosef Gottlieb of Stropkov (1794 – March 11, 1867) (Hebrew: חיים יוסף גאטליב), known as the Stropkover Rov, was a student of Rabbi Moshe Schreiber and author of Tiv Gittin ve-Kiddushin, published by his sons Efroim and Menashe in Ungvar in 1868.

Upon completing his studies in 1813, he married Breindel, the daughter of Myir of Tarcal, Hungary. The rabbi at that time in Tarcal was the author of Mareh Yechezkel, who later served as rabbi of Karlsburg, and he appointed him to learn with some of his disciples, and his own children. In 1823 he was appointed Dayan and teacher in the town of his birth, Tertzal, Hungary and sometime later also as rabbi, where he studied with his brother-in-law Rabbi Mordechai Ciment, and wrote extensively about Jewish law and Kabbalah. In 1841, after the author of Yeitev Lev left the rabbinate of Stropkov for Satoraljaujhely, Hungary, he was appointed chief rabbi and head of the Bet Din of Stropkov in 1847 at the recommendation of Rabbi Chaim Halberstam of Sanz. Chaim Yosef died on Monday, 4 Adar II, 5627 / 11 March 1867 and is buried in the Tisinec cemetery.

There is a school in Jerusalem named after him called Yeshivas Rabbenu Chaim Yosef. They published a book which lists all his descendants, called Sefer Hayachas.

== Notes and references ==
- The Rabbis of Stropkov
- Stropkov Memorial Book
- Arthur Kurzweil: How I discovered my Rabbinical Ancestry
