= MŠK Tesla Stropkov =

Slovak football club

- Full name: MŠK Tesla Stropkov
- Founded: 1920; 106 years ago
- Ground: Štadión MŠK Tesla Stropkov, Stropkov
- Capacity: 2,500
- President: Ondrej Brendza
- Coach: Ľubomír Reiter
- League: 3. Liga East group

MŠK Tesla Stropkov is a Slovak football team, based in the town of Stropkov. The club was founded in 1920. They currently play in the 3. Liga Východ (Slovakia), the third tier of the Slovak league system.

== History ==
=== Founding ===
Organized football in Stropkov was first mentioned in 1920. In 1960, when the TESLA plant was built in Stropkov, it would become the main sponsor of Tesla Stropkov.

=== Golden years ===
The greatest successes of MŠK Tesla Stropkov was when it achieved historic success in the years between 1981/82 and 1982/83, when the youth team and A-team got promoted to the Slovak First Football League.

=== Recent years ===
In the 2022–23 Slovak Cup, Tesla Stropkov were drawn with reigning league champions SK Slovan Bratislava in the 4th round. Tesla would lose the game, 3–2 scoring 2 goals in the last 10 minutes of the game.

MŠK Tesla Stropkov won the III. league East in the 2023/2024 league season. However, they could not advance due to them being a feeder club of 1. FC Tatran Prešov, and since Tatran did not manage to make it to the final stage of promotion for the top competition, Redfox Stará Ľubovňa took their spot in the second league.

== Recent seasons ==
| Year | Division | Position |
|---|---|---|
| 1993–1994 | 2. liga (II) | 5th |
| 1994–1995 | 2. liga (II) | 8th |
| 1995–1996 | 2. liga (II) | 10th |
| 1996–1997 | 2. liga (II) | 14th |
| 1997–1998 | 2. liga (II) | 9th |
| 1998–1999 | 2. liga (II) | 10th |
| 1999–2000 | 2. liga (II) | 13th (relegated) |
| 2012–13 | Majstrovstvá regiónu (IV) | 4th |
| 2013–14 | Majstrovstvá regiónu (IV) | 10th (promoted) |
| 2014–15 | 3. liga (III) | 10th |
| 2015–16 | 3. liga (III) | 4th |
| 2016–17 | 3. liga (III) | 12th |
| 2017–18 | 3. liga (III) | 5th |
| 2018–19 | 3. liga (III) | 6th |
| 2019–20 | 3. liga (III) | in progress |

== Current squad ==
As of 20 November 2019
Note: Flags indicate national team as defined under FIFA eligibility rules; some limited exceptions apply. Players may hold more than one non-FIFA nationality.

| No. | Pos. | Nation | Player |
|---|---|---|---|
| 1 | GK | UKR | Dmytro Prysiazhniuk |
| 2 | DF | SVK | Patrik Čurlík |
| 3 | MF | UKR | Oleksii Borovyk |
| 4 | DF | SVK | Daniel Petrišin |
| 6 | FW | SVK | Frederik Varga |
| 7 | MF | UKR | Pavel Krishtan |
| 8 | DF | SVK | Viktor Bochin |
| 9 | FW | SVK | Erik Burcák |
| 10 | MF | SVK | Branislav Artim |
| 11 | MF | SVK | Peter Poľák |
| 12 | DF | SVK | Milan Harvilko |

| No. | Pos. | Nation | Player |
|---|---|---|---|
| 13 | MF | SVK | Juraj Fečo |
| 14 | MF | SVK | Peter Jakubčo (captain) |
| 15 | MF | SVK | Erik Vaško |
| 16 | DF | SVK | Matúš Štefančík |
| 17 | FW | NGA | Candy Augustine Agban |
| 22 | K | SVK | Tomáš Majerník |
| -- | MF | SVK | Samuel Slobodník |
| -- | FW | SVK | Marek Korba |
| -- | FW | CUW | Gino van Kessel |

== Staff ==
| Position | Staff |
|---|---|
| Club Manager | (Slovakia) Ľubomír Reiter |
| Head Coach | (Slovakia) Ľubomír Reiter |
| Assistant Manager | (Slovakia) Alojz Špak |
| Goalkeepers Coach | (Slovakia) Marek Jenčo |
| Technical Assistant | (Slovakia) Ľuboš Komišák |
| Masseur | (Slovakia) Marián Hamerský |
| Doctor | (Slovakia) Dawood Khwaja |

== Notable players ==
Players who were growing in Stropkov club and had international caps for their respective countries or players who are now active players for Slovakia.

- (Czechoslovakia) Bohumil Andrejko
- (Czechoslovakia) Anton Flešár
- (Czechoslovakia) Albert Rusnák
- (Slovakia) Pavol Gostič
- (Slovakia) Juraj Čobej
- (Slovakia) Marek Špilár
- (Slovakia) Jozef Kožlej
- (Slovakia) Ľubomír Reiter
- (Slovakia) Róbert Pich
- (Slovakia) Pavol Šafranko
- (Curaçao) Gino van Kessel
