= Marek Špilár =

Slovak footballer

Personal information
- Full name: Marek Špilár
- Date of birth: 11 February 1975
- Place of birth: Stropkov, Czechoslovakia
- Date of death: 7 September 2013 (aged 38)
- Place of death: Prešov, Slovakia
- Height: 1.89 m (6 ft 2 1/2 in)
- Position: Defender

Youth career
- 1984–1994: MŠK Tesla Stropkov

Senior career*
Years	Team	Apps	(Gls)
1994–1995	Petra Drnovice	2	(0)
1995–1997	Tatran Prešov	53	(6)
1997–2000	1. FC Košice	75	(3)
2000–2001	Baník Ostrava	30	(0)
2001–2002	Sigma Olomouc	8	(0)
2003–2005	Club Brugge	32	(0)
2006–2007	Nagoya Grampus Eight	24	(1)

International career
1995–1997	Slovakia U-21	10	(0)
1997–2002	Slovakia	30	(0)
- * Club domestic league appearances and goals as of 8 May 2010

Marek Špilár (11 February 1975 – 7 September 2013) was a Slovak football player. He won a national league title with MFK Košice in Slovakia as well as two in Belgium with Club Brugge KV. He also played club football in the Czech Republic and Japan.

Špilár was capped 30 times for the Slovak national team from 1997 to 2002.

Špilár died in September 2013 at the age of 38 when he committed suicide by jumping out of a fifth-floor flat window in the city of Stropkov.

== Club statistics ==
Club performance			League	
Season	Club	League	Apps	Goals
Czech Republic			League	
1993/94	Petra Drnovice	Gambrinus liga	1	0
1994/95	Petra Drnovice	Gambrinus liga	1	0
Slovakia			League	
1995/96	Tatran Prešov	Superliga	27	0
1996/97	Tatran Prešov	Superliga	26	6
1997/98	Košice	Superliga	25	0
1998/99	Košice	Superliga	25	0
1999/00	Košice	Superliga	25	3
Czech Republic			League	
2000/01	Baník Ostrava	Gambrinus liga	23	0
2001/02	Baník Ostrava	Gambrinus liga	7	0
2001/02	Sigma Olomouc	Gambrinus liga	8	0
Belgium			League	
2002/03	Brugge	First Division	6	0
2003/04	Brugge	First Division	8	0
2004/05	Brugge	First Division	5	0
2005/06	Brugge	First Division	12	0
Japan			League	
2006	Nagoya Grampus Eight	J1 League	21	1
2007	Nagoya Grampus Eight	J1 League	3	0
Country	Czech Republic		40	0
Country	Slovakia		128	9
Country	Belgium		31	0
Country	Japan		24	1
Total			223	10

== Honours ==
Club Brugge

- Belgian Super Cup: 2005
