= Stropkov Animal Park =

Zoo in Slovakia

Coordinates: 49°12′17″N 21°39′05″E

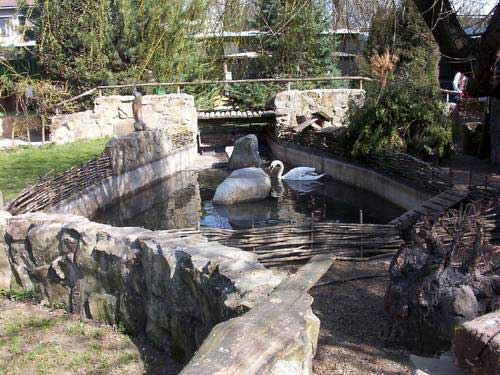
- Small pond at Stropkov Animal Park
- Interactive map of Stropkov Animal Park
- Date opened: 1984
- Location: Stropkov, Slovakia
- No. of animals: 200
- No. of species: 60
- Website: www.zoostropkov.sk

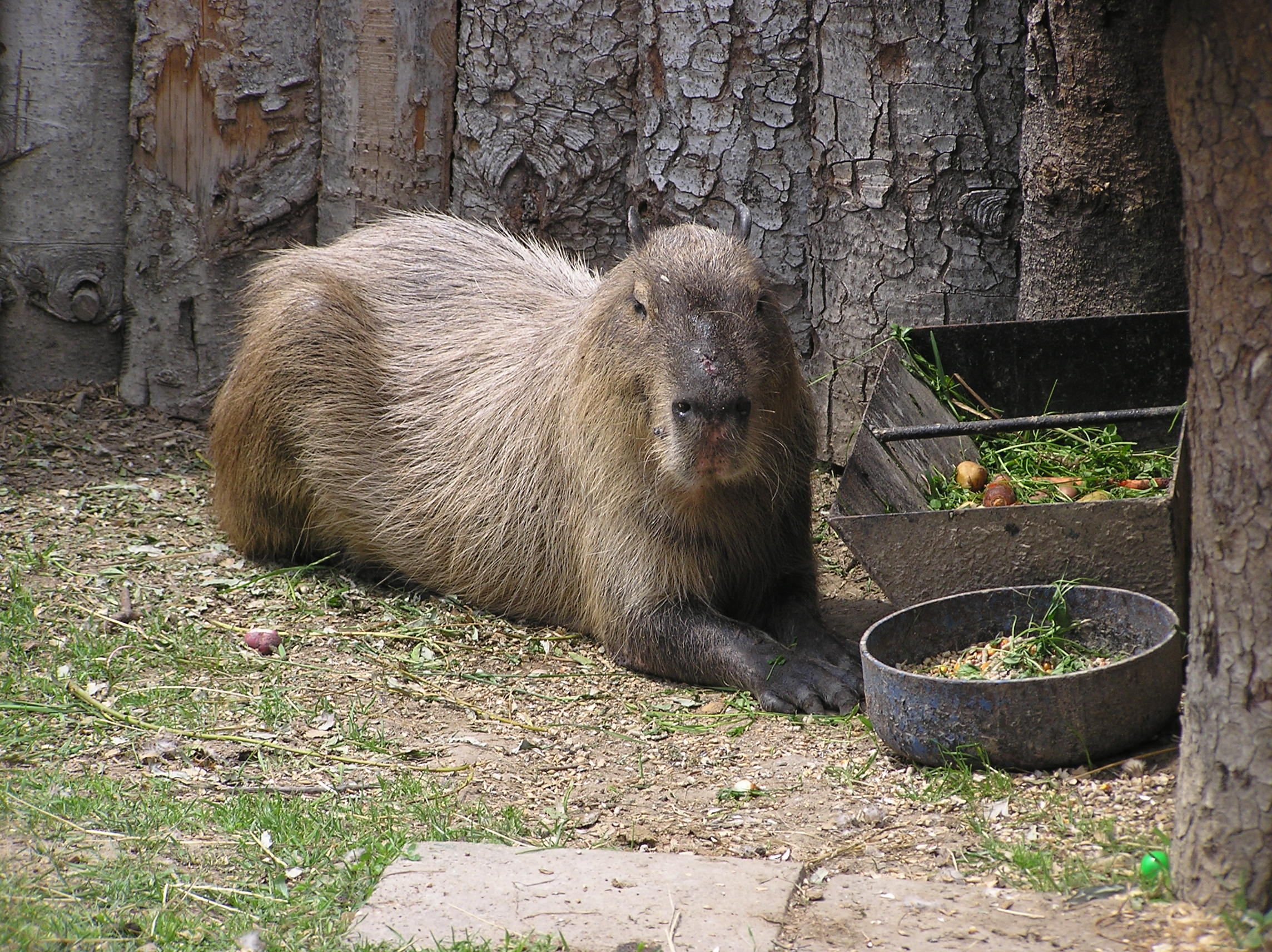
Capybara at Stropkov Animal Park

Stropkov Animal Park (Slovak: Park zvierat Stropkov) is a zoo in the town of Stropkov, Slovakia. It opened in 1984.

As of 2006, it had more than 200 birds, mammals and reptiles from more than 60 species. The zoo offers many activities and attractions for children.
