= AQUA Stadium =

Sports venue in Slovakia

Coordinates: 48.85600436102483°N 18.858404580582697°E

- Interactive map of AQUA Stadium
- Address: Turčianske Teplice, Žilina Region; Slovakia
- Capacity: 2,000

AQUA Stadion is a multi-use stadium in Turčianske Teplice, Slovakia. It is currently used mostly for football matches and is the home ground of ŠK Aqua Turčianske Teplice. The stadium holds 2,000 people. In the 2006–07 season, the stadium hosted matches of the Slovak Second League with the participation of this team. In 2011, the club was dissolved due to financial problems.

== Other uses ==
The stadium has also held games for the Slovakia national under-19 football team.
