= Markus Merk =

German football referee (born 1962)

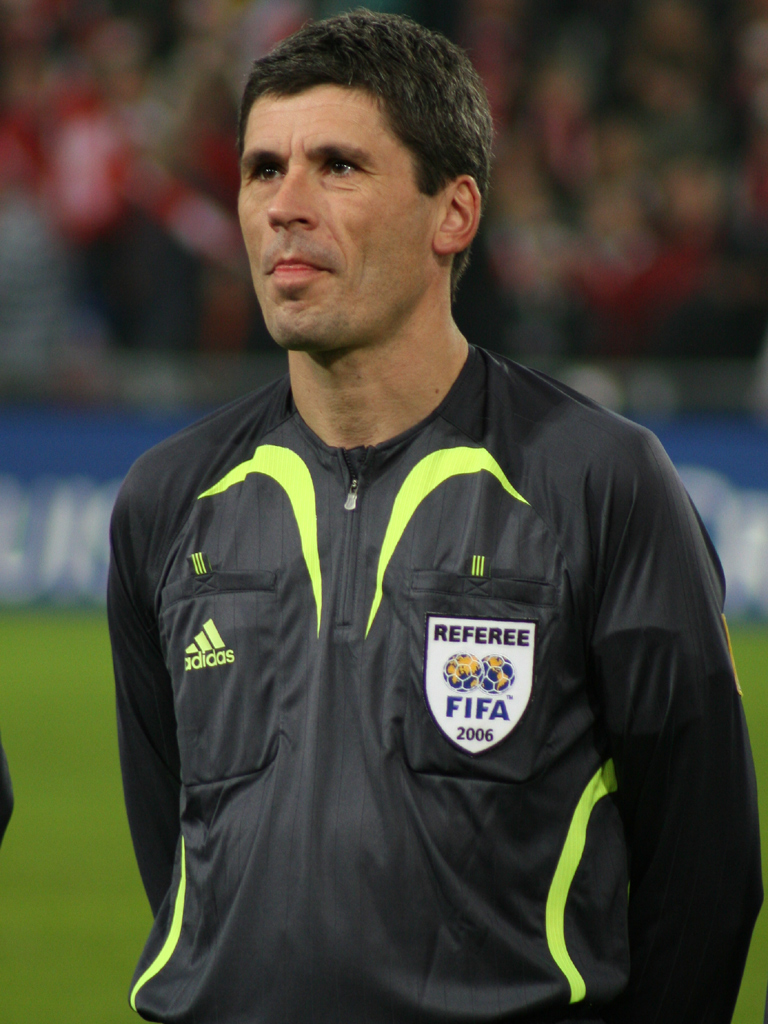
- Markus Merk at an international friendly between Switzerland and Brazil in November 2006
- Born: 15 March 1962 (age 64); Kaiserslautern, West Germany
- Occupation: Football referee
- Children: 1

Markus Merk (born 15 March 1962) is a former top-level German football referee. He is a six-time winner of the German Referee of the Year Award and the record holder in games refereed in the Bundesliga. In 2005, Merk was awarded the German Bundesverdienstkreuz (Federal Cross of Merit) in recognition of his service to football and his charity work in India. He ended his career by refereeing the match between Bayern Munich and Hertha BSC Berlin on the last day of the 2007–08 Bundesliga season on 17 May 2008.

He was ranked the best referee by the International Federation of Football History & Statistics in 2004, 2005 and 2007.

He is currently a pundit for Sky Deutschland and was the main referee commentator of the Turkish football channel Lig TV (which had the rights of the Turkish Super League) in the 2010–2011 season.

== Career ==
=== Bundesliga ===
In 1988, Merk was appointed the youngest Bundesliga referee ever, aged 25, representing his home club 1. FC Kaiserslautern. He became a FIFA referee four years later, and officiated at the 1992 Summer Olympics in Barcelona. In the following years, Merk established himself as a headstrong, reliable referee. He was elected an unprecedented six times as German Referee of the Year.

=== UEFA and FIFA ===
Merk was referee in the 1992 Olympics (two call-ups). He was also the fourth official in the 1993 World Cup qualifier between the Netherlands and England; during this match Merk repeatedly restrained the furious England manager Graham Taylor, when a penalty and red card decision had gone against England. Taylor felt Ronald Koeman should have been sent off and England have a penalty for a professional foul on David Platt. Neither happened and Koeman went on to score against England. Taylor was furious at the referee, though years later, in an interview with the Observer, he expressed gratitude to Merk for not sending him to the stands when he could have

Merk was also an official at UEFA Euro 2000 (3), the 2002 FIFA World Cup (2), and UEFA Euro 2004 (3). At Euro 2000, he took charge of two group matches, between co-hosts Belgium and Sweden, and Slovenia and Spain; he later also officiated the semi-final between Italy and co-hosts the Netherlands in Amsterdam, which the Azzurri won 3–1 on penalties after a goalless draw following extra-time. During the match, he sent-off Italy's Gianluca Zambrotta for a double booking, and awarded two penalties to the co-hosts, both of which were missed. At the 2002 World Cup, he officiated a group match between co-hosts Japan and Russia, as well as the round of 16 match between Denmark and England. At Euro 2004, Merk was selected to take charge of the group game between England and defending champions France, with France running out 2–1 winners late in the game after a controversial refereeing performance from Merk. He awarded a penalty to England, which was taken by David Beckham but saved by Fabien Barthez, after Wayne Rooney was brought down in the box. Despite being a clear goal-scoring opportunity, Merk only awarded a yellow card to France’s Mikael Silvestre. Silvestre later admitted he was “surprised” by the decision and that he should have been sent off. He also officiated the final, becoming the first German referee since Rudi Glöckner of East Germany in 1970, to helm a World Cup or European Championship Finals. His assistants were Jan-Hendrik Salver and Christian Schräer. Merk's refereeing of the final match of UEFA Euro 2004 in Lisbon was strongly opposed by hosts Portugal. Portugal's opponent was Greece, whose team's coach, Otto Rehhagel, was also German and a dental patient of Merk, leading to speculation that the Greek team could benefit from favourable refereeing decisions during the final. These claims were firmly rejected by both Merk and Rehhagel. Nevertheless, Merk received worldwide recognition for his excellent refereeing in this game, with Greece winning the match 1–0.

At club level, Merk also refereed the 1997 UEFA Cup Winners' Cup final between Barcelona and Paris Saint-Germain (1–0), and the 2003 UEFA Champions League final between Italian clubs Juventus and Milan, with the latter team winning 3–2 on penalties after a goalless draw.

Merk was the referee in the semi-final of the 2003 FIFA Confederations Cup between Cameroon and Colombia (1–0), a game remembered for the death of Marc-Vivien Foé.

On 21 April 2004, during the first leg of the Champions League semi-finals, a 0–0 draw between Porto and Deportivo at the Estádio do Dragão, Jorge Andrade, Deportivo's defender and a former Porto player, was sent off by Merk for a kick on Deco. Andrade alleged that the gesture was of a friendly nature, but the referee was eluded by it, and immediately gave the defender his marching orders. He was forced to serve a one-match ban. Eventually Jose Mourinho's Porto team would qualify to the final, and went on to win the tournament.

In the 2004–05 Champions League quarter-finals he whistled the second leg game between AC Milan and Inter Milan and controversially disallowed the goal from Inter midfielder Esteban Cambiasso, which led to Inter fans throwing bottles and flares onto the pitch and the game was eventually abandoned.

In August 2005, he sent off Lionel Messi on his first international game, a friendly against Hungary, for allegedly elbowing Vilmos Vanczák, a controversial decision that was criticised by several pundits; Messi had been brought in less than a minute before. Argentina won the match 2–1.

Another controversial moment in Merk's career came in the 71st minute of a 2005–06 UEFA Champions League group match between Artmedia and Porto on 6 December 2005, when Merk overlooked a handball by Pepe in the penalty area. If given and scored, the penalty would have sent Artmedia through to the round of 16.

At the 2006 World Cup in his home country Germany, Merk officiated three group matches; he was not chosen to referee any of the games in the knockout stages. His final match of the tournament was United States vs. Ghana, the final game of group E, with the latter team winning 2–1 and advancing to the knockout stages along with Italy, while the United States were eliminated from the tournament; during the latter match, he awarded a controversial first-half penalty to Ghana, which was converted by Stephen Appiah, after he judged Oguchi Onyewu to have fouled Razak Pimpong inside the box while attempting to win a header, when the latter player fell to the ground. Merk was highly critical of the whole FIFA refereeing process after that, stating in the German sports TV show das aktuelle Sportstudio, it "robbed me two weeks of my life" being forced to stay in the referee camp without a call-up, and adding a mere two was a bitterly meagre payoff regarding the fact he (among others) had to visit countless seminars and were sent on small junior tournaments all over the world to merely assist, comparing it to as if Ronaldinho would have to agree to sit on the bench for the Brazilian U20 in order to qualify for the World Cup.

Merk is also a long-time proponent of instant video replay to judge critical scenes. On 1 March 2008, when Merk was refereeing a 2007–08 Bundesliga match, Werder Bremen striker Markus Rosenberg scored a goal against Borussia Dortmund from clear offside position; Merk initially gave the goal, but realised immediately after that it should have been disallowed, but it was too late to retract his error. He called it "the most bitter moment of my career" and called for introduction of instant replay. Werder Bremen won the match 2–0.

== Charity ==
The religious Merk is active helping slums in India, providing basic dental care for the poor since 1991. He helps the Indienhilfe Kaiserslautern, which erects schools and housing for the homeless, as well as offering basic medical care.

== Personal life ==
Merk was born in Kaiserslautern. A dentist by trade, he lives in Otterbach with his wife and son. He was a professional dentist until 2005, when he stopped practising because of his opposition to the Praxisgebühr, a quarterly fee for patients consulting doctors. Today, he leads motivational seminars. During his youth and teens, Merk suffered ridicule because of his high-pitched, squeaky voice. After undergoing extensive speech therapy, he now talks in a normal baritone.

Merk is also one of the fittest referees in the game. He regularly laps his colleagues in the annual fitness tests, and his personal best for a marathon is 2:42. He is also a dedicated triathlete.

As a side note, "Merk" is the imperative form of the German verb "merken" (to notice, to keep in mind). For this reason, his homepage is named merk-es-dir.de ("keep-it-in-mind.de").

== Major matches refereed ==
Date	Match	Tournament	Ref
14 May 1997	Barcelona vs. Paris Saint-Germain (1–0)	1997 UEFA Cup Winners' Cup final	
28 May 2003	Juventus vs. Milan (0–0; 2–3 on penalties)	2003 UEFA Champions League final	
4 July 2004	Portugal vs. Greece (0–1)	UEFA Euro 2004 Final	

== Honours and accolades ==
- DFB German Referee of the Year: 1995, 1996, 2000, 2003, 2004, 2006
- IFFHS "The World's Best Referee": 2004, 2005, 2007
- Bundesverdienstkreuz (major order of merit of the Federal Republic of Germany): 2005

== Literature ==
- Markus Merk: BeWEGEnd
- Markus Merk: Untersuchungen zur Formänderung kalt- und heißpolymerisierender Prothesenkunststoffe nach Behandlung im Ultraschallbad ("Examinations on the form change of cold- and hot-polymerising prothesis plastics after ultrasound treatment"), Dissertation by Markus Merk, University of Cologne, 1990.
