= János Szerednyei =

János Szerednyei (26 May 1920, Szerencs, Hungary – 26 July 1948, Voroshilovka, USSR) was a Hungarian Catholic priest who voluntarily joined a group of his parishioners from Tarcal set to be deported to the USSR in 1945. He died in an accident in a coal mine, where he was working.

== Biography ==
János Szerednyei was ordained in Kosice on 11 June 1944. After ordination he was sent to Tarcal as vicar with the local parish.

After the arrival of the Red Army, on 24 January 1945 the Soviets began to round up people in Tarcal for deportations to work in the USSR. The church rector and the vicar went to the Soviet authorities to request that the group be let go, or at least the women and children be excluded. (According to some sources they wanted to buy the people out with wine – Tarcal is a part of the Tokaj wine region.) They managed to achieve freedom for some of the women and one couple on condition that János Szerednyei goes instead of them. He agreed to do so and went to the vicarage to collect a few necessary belongings. The group was supposed to work for just three days.

The deportation was a part of the practice of what the Hungarians called the "málenykij robot" (from "small work" in Russian). It involved taking people by force to do work ranging from half-a-day cleaning of rubble to deportation to the gulag, from which one could never return.

After a few days of waiting and then a month-long trip, the group finally arrived at their destination: camp number 7144/1223 in Voroshilovka, Uspenskij rayon, Voroshilovgrad Oblast, in the Donetsk coal basin. They were to work in the nearby Voroshilov coal mine (in Ukrainian). Szerendnyei worked as a miner 400 meters under the surface. His camp number was 542.

In the camp he wrote poetry, played the violin and tried to raise spirits of his fellow prisoners. Sometimes he would celebrate the Mass in secret, for this was punished with detention.

As a sign of recognition for his work he received a black suit from the camp leadership.

He died in an accident while returning from work in the mine. Tired, he was sitting on a coal carriage, whose brakes suddenly broke down. The carriage began to roll faster and faster back into the mine and the miners started to jump. Szerednyei jumped too but he hit himself on the temple and died on the spot.

As he was the best worker in the camp, the camp authorities allowed that he is buried in a coffin, which counted as an exception then.

== Memory ==
A plaque commemorating János Szerednyei is located inside the Catholic church in Tarcal, where he worked.

== Gallery ==
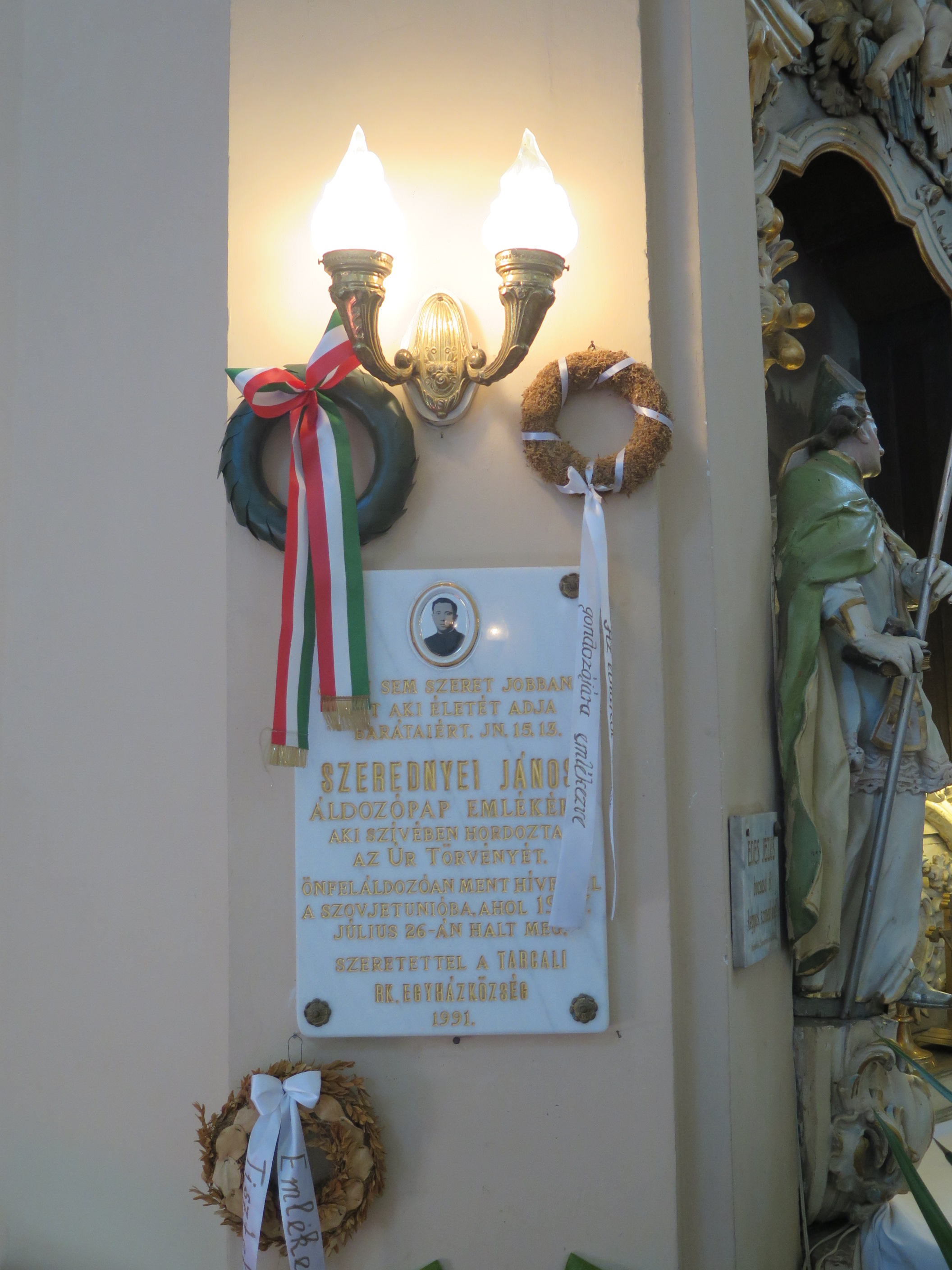
Memorial plaque of János Szerednyei in the catholic church in Tarcal

== Bibliography ==
- H. Örkényi Ilona A tarcali káplán sírhantja Budapest: Masszi Kiadó, 2000
- Szerednyei János. Tarcali káplán hősiés életáldozata Budapest: Kalot Kiadó, 2005
- János Szerednyei on the Számon Tartva page
- János Szerednyei in the Hungarian Catholic Lexicon (Magyar Katolikus Lexikon)
