= Tarcal =

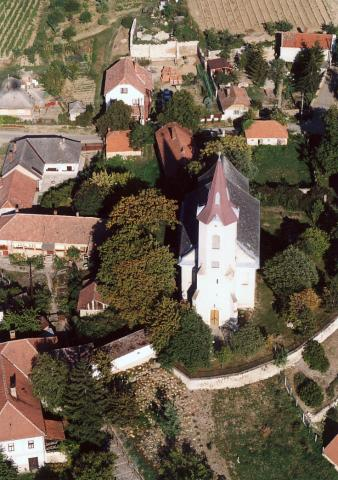
- Aerial photo of Tarcal

- Flag Coat of arms

- Location of Tarcal in Hungary
- Coordinates: 48.13128°N 21.34267°E
- Country: Hungary
- Region: Northern Hungary
- County: Borsod-Abaúj-Zemplén

Area
  - Total: 53.72 km^{2} (20.74 sq mi)

Population (2012)
  - Total: 2,824
  - Density: 52.57/km^{2} (136.2/sq mi)
- Time zone: UTC+1 (CET)
  - Summer (DST): UTC+2 (CEST)
- Postal code: 3915
- Area code: +36 47
- Website: http://tarcal.hu/

Tarcal is a village on the eastern edge of Borsod-Abaúj-Zemplén county, northern Hungary, in the famous Tokaj-Hegyalja wine district, 55 km (34 mi) from Miskolc.

== Geography ==
Tarcal is located at 48°07′N 21°25′E, at the western foot of the 516 m high Nagy Hill at Tokaj at the southernmost foothills of the Eperjes-Tokaj mountain range..

Tarcal is a grape-growing locale of the Tokaj-Hegyalja wine district. All the traditional Tokaji grape varieties (Furmint, Hárslevelű, Sárga Muskotály (Yellow muscat) grown here dry well on the vine, so they are suitable for vintage wines, Szamorodni wines, and 3-to-6 Puttonyos Tokaji aszú wines. These wines are seasoned in oakwood casks in cellars covered with racodium cellare, a cellar mould.

== History ==
The estate was presented to Captain Turzul by Árpád at the time of the Conquest.

In 1941 the population of Tarcal was 4004.

During deportations to the USSR in 1945 the local priest János Szerednyei voluntarily agreed to join a group of Tarcal inhabitants rounded up for deportations. He was sent to a labour camp in Vorosilovka, a part of the gulag. Szerednyei died in a coal mine accident in 1948.

In 2015 an 8.5-meter statue of Jesus was displayed on a hill above the village. The sculptor was Sándor Szabó.

== Jewish community ==
The Jewish population in Tarcal was 299 in 1941. Most of the Tarcal Jews were murdered in the Holocaust in 1944. In 1946 only 30 Jews lived in Tarcal.

Among the famous rabbis of Tarcal were:

- Rabbi Yitzchak Isaac Taub, the first Hasidic Rebbe in Hungary. He later relocated to Nagykálló and remains famous as the Kaliv Rebbe.
- Rabbi Yechezkel Paneth (1813–1822), author of Mare Yeheskel (Marmaros, 1875).
- Rabbi Chayim Yosef Gottlieb (born Tarcal, 1790). In 1823 he was appointed dayan and teacher in Tarcal.
- Rabbi Yaakov Shapira (1876–1906), a famous scholar, often mentioned in the halachic responsa of the famous rabbis of Hungary.
- Rabbi Yehoshua Heshil Rosner (1906–1944). He was the son-in-law of Rabbi Yaakov Shapira. Rabbi Rosner was murdered in the Holocaust in 1944.

== Sights of Tarcal ==
The architectural sights of the village are mostly connected to the Rákóczi family. The mansions called King court, Rákóczi tavern and Sebeö mansion got their present form at the end of the 18th century.

The Roman Catholic church is from 1615. Its foundations, crypt and the bottom part of the tower are of medieval origin. The Calvinist church, where a memorial tablet commemorates the Reformed Confession, which was created here by the Tarcal Council in 1564, and the oval planned Terézia chapel were built between 1770 and 1790. The renovated synagogue was built around 1800.

Another interesting sight of Tarcal may be the Andrássy Manor, which was built in baroque style in the 16th century. Under the mansion, owned by the Andrássy family for several decades, there is a hidden cellar mainly used for producing and storing wine.

== Images ==
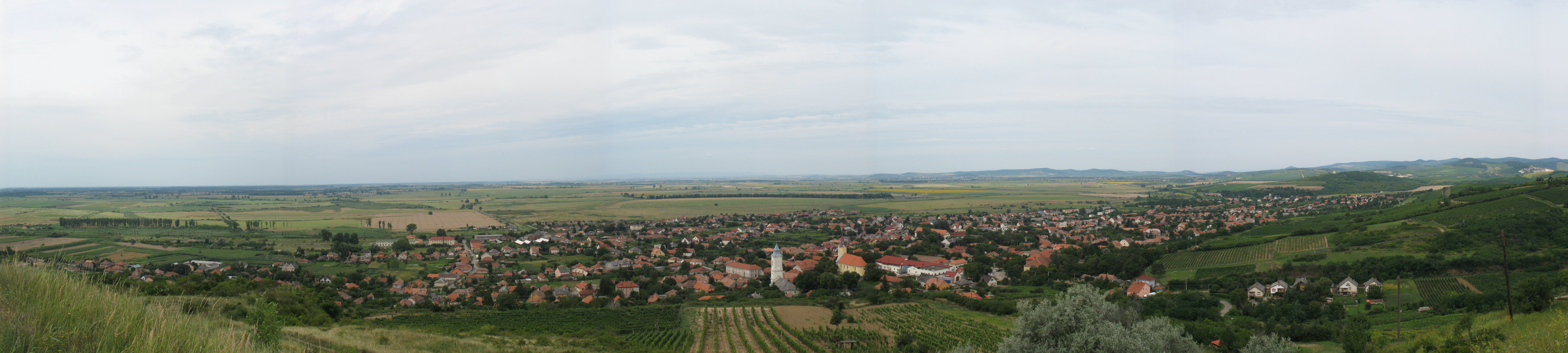
A panorama of Tarcal taken from the Kopasz mountain
