= Ľubomír Reiter =

Slovak footballer and manager

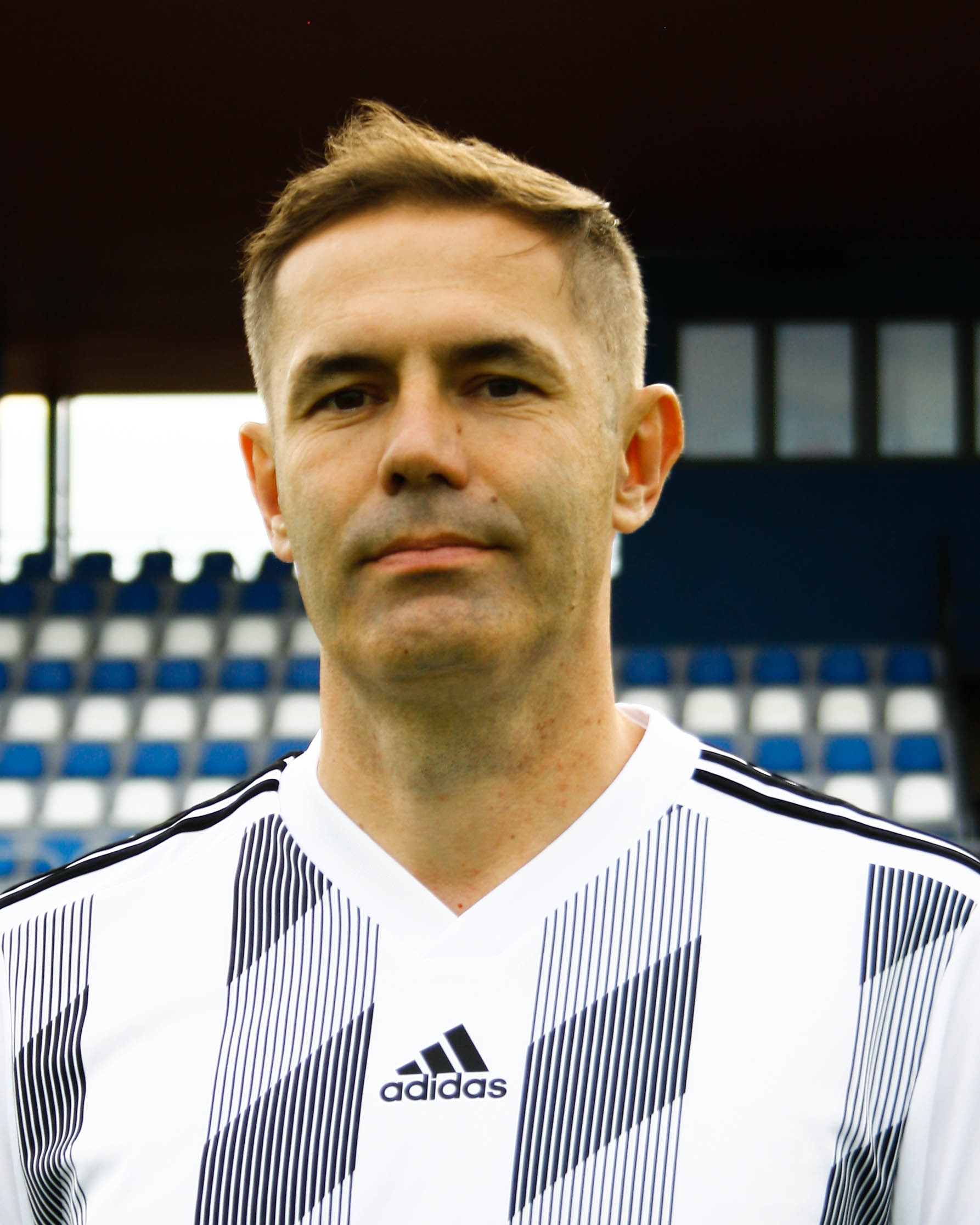

Personal information
- Full name: Ľubomír Reiter
- Date of birth: 3 December 1974 (age 51)
- Place of birth: Stropkov, Czechoslovakia
- Height: 1.81 m (5 ft 11 1/2 in)
- Position: Striker

Team information
- Current team: FC Petržalka (manager)

Senior career*
Years	Team	Apps	(Gls)
1995–1996	MŠK Tesla Stropkov	38	(21)
1996–1998	FC Tatran Prešov	33	(6)
1998–2001	MŠK Žilina	87	(29)
2001–2005	Sigma Olomouc	88	(31)
2005	Chicago Fire	14	(3)
2006–2008	Artmedia Petržalka	34	(13)
2007	→ Slavia Prague (loan)	2	(0)
Total		296	(103)

International career
2001–2005	Slovakia	28	(9)

Managerial career
- 2011–2012: MŠK Tesla Stropkov
- 2015–2016: Tatran Prešov U-16
- 2017–2018: AS Trenčín (Assistant)
- 2018: MŠK Žilina (Youth)
- 2019–2022: MŠK Tesla Stropkov
- 2023–2024: FK Humenné
- 2024–2025: Liptovský Mikuláš
- 2025: FC Petržalka
- * Club domestic league appearances and goals as of 10 July 2025

Ľubomír "Ľuboš" Reiter (born 3 December 1974) is a Slovak former footballer who played as a striker and current manager of FC Petržalka. Previously, he was manager of MŠK Tesla Stropkov.

== Playing career ==
Reiter played for Tatran Prešov (1996–99) and MŠK Žilina (1999–2002) in his native Slovakia and then for Sigma Olomouc (2001–05) and Slavia Prague (2007) in the Czech Republic. He scored 15 goals in the 2003-04 season, finishing among the Czech league's top scorers. In 2005, he came to Major League Soccer and the Chicago Fire. However, his season with the Fire was a disappointment, as he only scored three goals and left MLS to go back to his native Slovakia.

At the time of his signing by the Fire, Reiter was a current Slovak international, a rarity for European players in MLS. He had been capped 25 times for his country, scoring eight goals. Reiter was a regular during Slovakia's 2006 World Cup qualification campaign.
