= 2014 FIFA World Cup qualification – UEFA Group G =

The 2014 FIFA World Cup qualification UEFA Group G was a UEFA qualifying group for the 2014 FIFA World Cup. The group comprised Greece, Slovakia, Bosnia and Herzegovina, Lithuania, Latvia and Liechtenstein.

Bosnia and Herzegovina won the group on the ratio of head from Greece and thus qualified directly for the 2014 FIFA World Cup, their first major tournament as an independent country. Greece, as one of the eight best runners-up, advanced to the play-offs, where they were drawn to play home-and-away matches against Romania. They won the first match and drew the second, thus also qualifying for the World Cup.

== Standings ==
Pos	Team	Pld	W	D	L	GF	GA	GD	Pts	Qualification	Bosnia and Herzegovina national football team	Greece national football team	Slovakia national football team	Lithuania national football team	Latvia national football team	Liechtenstein national football team
1	Bosnia and Herzegovina	10	8	1	1	30	6	+24	25	Qualification to 2014 FIFA World Cup	—	3–1	0–1	3–0	4–1	4–1
2	Greece	10	8	1	1	12	4	+8	25	Advance to second round	0–0	—	1–0	2–0	1–0	2–0
3	Slovakia	10	3	4	3	11	10	+1	13		1–2	0–1	—	1–1	2–1	2–0
4	Lithuania	10	3	2	5	9	11	−2	11		0–1	0–1	1–1	—	2–0	2–0
5	Latvia	10	2	2	6	10	20	−10	8		0–5	1–2	2–2	2–1	—	2–0
6	Liechtenstein	10	0	2	8	4	25	−21	2		1–8	0–1	1–1	0–2	1–1	—

== Matches ==
The match schedule was determined at a meeting in Bratislava, Slovakia, on 18 November 2011.

7 September 2012
19:00 UTC+2

Liechtenstein	1–8	Bosnia and Herzegovina
Christen 60'	Report	Misimović 26', 31'; Ibišević 33', 39', 82'; Džeko 46', 64', 80'

Rheinpark Stadion, Vaduz
Attendance: 5,900
Referee: Marco Borg (Malta)
7 September 2012
21:15 UTC+3

Lithuania	1–1	Slovakia
Žaliūkas 18'	Report	Sapara 41'

LFF stadionas, Vilnius
Attendance: 4,000
Referee: Carlos Clos Gómez (Spain)
7 September 2012
21:30 UTC+3

Latvia	1–2	Greece
Cauņa 41' (pen.)	Report	Spyropoulos 57'; Gekas 69'

Skonto stadions, Riga
Attendance: 7,956
Referee: Ivan Bebek (Croatia)

11 September 2012
20:00 UTC+2

Bosnia and Herzegovina	4–1	Latvia
Misimović 12', 54'; Pjanić 44'; Džeko 90+2'	Report	Gorkšs 5'

Stadion Bilino Polje, Zenica
Attendance: 11,900
Referee: Deniz Aytekin (Germany)
11 September 2012
20:15 UTC+2

Slovakia	2–0	Liechtenstein
Sapara 37'; Jakubko 79'	Report

Štadión Pasienky, Bratislava
Attendance: 4,326
Referee: Simon Lee Evans (Wales)
11 September 2012
21:45 UTC+3

Greece	2–0	Lithuania
Ninis 55'; Mitroglou 72'	Report

Karaiskakis Stadium, Athens
Attendance: 21,466
Referee: Mark Courtney (Northern Ireland)

12 October 2012
19:30 UTC+2

Liechtenstein	0–2	Lithuania
	Report	Česnauskis 50', 74'

Rheinpark Stadion, Vaduz
Attendance: 1,112
Referee: Slavko Vinčić (Slovenia)
12 October 2012
20:15 UTC+2

Slovakia	2–1	Latvia
Hamšík 5' (pen.); Sapara 9'	Report	Verpakovskis 84' (pen.)

Štadión Pasienky, Bratislava
Attendance: 4,012
Referee: Danny Makkelie (Netherlands)
12 October 2012
21:45 UTC+3

Greece	0–0	Bosnia and Herzegovina
	Report

Karaiskakis Stadium, Athens
Attendance: 26,211
Referee: Antonio Damato (Italy)

16 October 2012
20:00 UTC+3

Latvia	2–0	Liechtenstein
Kamešs 29'; Gauračs 77'	Report

Skonto stadions, Riga
Attendance: 3,500
Referee: István Kovács (Hungary)
16 October 2012
20:00 UTC+2

Bosnia and Herzegovina	3–0	Lithuania
Ibišević 29'; Džeko 35'; Pjanić 41'	Report

Stadion Bilino polje, Zenica
Attendance: 11,920
Referee: Miroslav Zelinka (Czech Republic)
16 October 2012
20:30 UTC+2

Slovakia	0–1	Greece
	Report	Salpingidis 63'

Štadión Pasienky, Bratislava
Attendance: 7,494
Referee: William Collum (Scotland)

22 March 2013
19:30 UTC+1

Liechtenstein	1–1	Latvia
Polverino 17'	Report	Cauņa 30'

Rheinpark Stadion, Vaduz
Attendance: 1,150
Referee: Kevin Clancy (Scotland)
22 March 2013
20:10 UTC+1

Slovakia	1–1	Lithuania
Jakubko 40'	Report	Šernas 19'

Štadión pod Dubňom, Žilina
Attendance: 4,560
Referee: Michael Oliver (England)
22 March 2013
20:45 UTC+1

Bosnia and Herzegovina	3–1	Greece
Džeko 29', 53'; Ibišević 36'	Report	Gekas 90+3'

Stadion Bilino polje, Zenica
Attendance: 11,100
Referee: Björn Kuipers (Netherlands)

7 June 2013
19:30 UTC+3

Latvia	0–5	Bosnia and Herzegovina
	Report	Lulić 48'; Ibišević 53'; Medunjanin 63'; Pjanić 80'; Džeko 82'

Skonto stadions, Riga
Attendance: 7,700
Referee: Mike Dean (England)
7 June 2013
20:00 UTC+2

Liechtenstein	1–1	Slovakia
Büchel 13'	Report	Ďurica 73'

Rheinpark Stadion, Vaduz
Attendance: 1,623
Referee: Martin Strömbergsson (Sweden)
7 June 2013
21:45 UTC+3

Lithuania	0–1	Greece
	Report	Christodoulopoulos 20'

LFF stadionas, Vilnius
Attendance: 4,500
Referee: Olegário Benquerença (Portugal)

6 September 2013
21:10 UTC+3

Latvia	2–1	Lithuania
Bulvītis 20'; Zjuzins 42'	Report	Matulevičius 44'

Skonto stadions, Riga
Attendance: 7,306
Referee: Sébastien Delferiere (Belgium)
6 September 2013
20:15 UTC+2

Bosnia and Herzegovina	0–1	Slovakia
	Report	Pečovský 77'

Stadion Bilino Polje, Zenica
Attendance: 11,620
Referee: Nicola Rizzoli (Italy)
6 September 2013
20:45 UTC+2

Liechtenstein	0–1	Greece
	Report	Mitroglou 72'

Rheinpark Stadion, Vaduz
Attendance: 2,680
Referee: Stanislav Todorov (Bulgaria)

10 September 2013
18:30 UTC+3

Lithuania	2–0	Liechtenstein
Matulevičius 18'; Kijanskas 40'	Report

ARVI futbolo arena, Marijampolė
Attendance: 1,955
Referee: Lasha Silagava (Georgia)
10 September 2013
20:15 UTC+2

Slovakia	1–2	Bosnia and Herzegovina
Hamšík 43'	Report	Bičakčić 70'; Hajrović 78'

Štadión pod Dubňom, Žilina
Attendance: 9,438
Referee: David Fernández Borbalán (Spain)
10 September 2013
21:45 UTC+3

Greece	1–0	Latvia
Salpingidis 58'	Report

Karaiskakis Stadium, Athens
Attendance: 18,983
Referee: Kristinn Jakobsson (Iceland)

11 October 2013
18:30 UTC+3

Lithuania	2–0	Latvia
Černych 7'; Mikoliūnas 68'	Report

LFF stadionas, Vilnius
Attendance: 2,900
Referee: Petur Reinert (Faroe Islands)
11 October 2013
20:00 UTC+2

Bosnia and Herzegovina	4–1	Liechtenstein
Džeko 27', 39'; Misimović 34'; Ibišević 38'	Report	Hasler 61'

Stadion Bilino Polje, Zenica
Attendance: 11,200
Referee: Richard Liesveld (Netherlands)
11 October 2013
21:45 UTC+3

Greece	1–0	Slovakia
Škrtel 44' (o.g.)	Report

Karaiskakis Stadium, Athens
Attendance: 21,067
Referee: Deniz Aytekin (Germany)

15 October 2013
20:00 UTC+3

Greece	2–0	Liechtenstein
Salpingidis 7'; Karagounis 81'	Report

Karaiskakis Stadium, Athens
Attendance: 18,676
Referee: Libor Kovařík (Czech Republic)
15 October 2013
20:00 UTC+3

Lithuania	0–1	Bosnia and Herzegovina
	Report	Ibišević 68'

Darius and Girėnas Stadium, Kaunas
Attendance: 6,239
Referee: Felix Zwayer (Germany)
15 October 2013
21:10 UTC+3

Latvia	2–2	Slovakia
Šabala 47'; Rode 90+2'	Report	Jakubko 9'; Saláta 16'

Skonto stadions, Riga
Attendance: 3,813
Referee: Yevhen Aranovskiy (Ukraine)

== Goalscorers ==
There were 76 goals scored in 30 matches, for an average of 2.53 goals per match.

10 goals

- (Bosnia and Herzegovina) Edin Džeko

8 goals

- (Bosnia and Herzegovina) Vedad Ibišević

5 goals

- (Bosnia and Herzegovina) Zvjezdan Misimović

3 goals

- (Bosnia and Herzegovina) Miralem Pjanić
- (Greece) Dimitris Salpingidis
- (Slovakia) Martin Jakubko
- (Slovakia) Marek Sapara

2 goals

- (Greece) Theofanis Gekas
- (Greece) Konstantinos Mitroglou
- (Latvia) Aleksandrs Cauņa
- (Lithuania) Edgaras Česnauskis
- (Lithuania) Deivydas Matulevičius
- (Slovakia) Marek Hamšík

1 goal

- (Bosnia and Herzegovina) Ermin Bičakčić
- (Bosnia and Herzegovina) Izet Hajrović
- (Bosnia and Herzegovina) Senad Lulić
- (Bosnia and Herzegovina) Haris Medunjanin
- (Greece) Lazaros Christodoulopoulos
- (Greece) Giorgos Karagounis
- (Greece) Sotiris Ninis
- (Greece) Nikos Spyropoulos
- (Latvia) Nauris Bulvītis
- (Latvia) Edgars Gauračs
- (Latvia) Kaspars Gorkšs
- (Latvia) Vladimirs Kamešs
- (Latvia) Renārs Rode
- (Latvia) Valērijs Šabala
- (Latvia) Māris Verpakovskis
- (Latvia) Artūrs Zjuzins
- (Liechtenstein) Martin Büchel
- (Liechtenstein) Mathias Christen
- (Liechtenstein) Nicolas Hasler
- (Liechtenstein) Michele Polverino
- (Lithuania) Fedor Černych
- (Lithuania) Tadas Kijanskas
- (Lithuania) Saulius Mikoliūnas
- (Lithuania) Darvydas Šernas
- (Lithuania) Marius Žaliūkas
- (Slovakia) Ján Ďurica
- (Slovakia) Viktor Pečovský
- (Slovakia) Kornel Saláta

1 own goal

- (Slovakia) Martin Škrtel (against Greece)

== Discipline ==
Pos	Player	Country	Booked	Sent off (straight red)	Suspended for match(es)	Reason
FW	Tadas Labukas	Lithuania	2	1	vs Liechtenstein (12 October 2012)	Sent off in a 2014 World Cup qualifying match
DF	Daniel Kaufmann	Liechtenstein	2	1	vs Latvia (22 March 2013)	Sent off in a 2014 World Cup qualifying match
MF	Viktor Pečovský	Slovakia	0	1	vs Liechtenstein (11 September 2012)	Sent off in a 2014 World Cup qualifying match
MF	Aleksandrs Fertovs	Latvia	0	1	vs Lithuania (6 September 2013)	Sent off in a 2014 World Cup qualifying match
MF	Gediminas Vičius	Lithuania	4	0	vs Liechtenstein (12 October 2012)	Booked in two 2014 World Cup qualifying matches
FW	Mathias Christen	Liechtenstein	4	0	vs Lithuania (12 October 2012) vs Lithuania (10 September 2013)	Booked in two 2014 World Cup qualifying matches Booked in two 2014 World Cup qualifying matches
MF	Edgaras Česnauskis	Lithuania	4	0	vs Bosnia and Herzegovina (16 October 2012) vs Latvia (11 October 2013)	Booked in two 2014 World Cup qualifying matches Booked in two 2014 World Cup qualifying matches
MF	Saulius Mikoliūnas	Lithuania	2	0	vs Bosnia and Herzegovina (16 October 2012)	Booked in two 2014 World Cup qualifying matches
DF	Oskars Kļava	Latvia	2	0	vs Liechtenstein (16 October 2012)	Booked in two 2014 World Cup qualifying matches
DF	Ritus Krjauklis	Latvia	2	0	vs Liechtenstein (16 October 2012)	Booked in two 2014 World Cup qualifying matches
DF	Arūnas Klimavičius	Lithuania	2	0	vs Slovakia (22 March 2013)	Booked in two 2014 World Cup qualifying matches
DF	Deniss Ivanovs	Latvia	2	0	vs Liechtenstein (22 March 2013)	Booked in two 2014 World Cup qualifying matches
MF	Michal Breznaník	Slovakia	2	0	vs Lithuania (22 March 2013)	Booked in two 2014 World Cup qualifying matches
DF	Ritvars Rugins	Latvia	2	1	vs Bosnia and Herzegovina (7 June 2013) vs Lithuania (11 October 2013)	Booked in two 2014 World Cup qualifying matches Sent off in a 2014 World Cup qualifying match
MF	Franz Burgmeier	Liechtenstein	4	0	vs Slovakia (7 June 2013) vs Bosnia and Herzegovina (11 October 2013)	Booked in two 2014 World Cup qualifying matches
MF	Michele Polverino	Liechtenstein	3	0	vs Slovakia (7 June 2013)	Booked in two 2014 World Cup qualifying matches
DF	Martin Stocklasa	Liechtenstein	3	0	vs Slovakia (7 June 2013)	Booked in two 2014 World Cup qualifying matches
FW	Martin Jakubko	Slovakia	3	0	vs Lithuania (7 June 2013)	Booked in two 2014 World Cup qualifying matches
DF	Martin Škrtel	Slovakia	2	0	vs Lithuania (7 June 2013)	Booked in two 2014 World Cup qualifying matches
MF	Deividas Šemberas	Lithuania	2	0	vs Greece (7 June 2013)	Booked in two 2014 World Cup qualifying matches
FW	Darvydas Šernas	Lithuania	2	0	vs Greece (7 June 2013)	Booked in two 2014 World Cup qualifying matches
MF	Nicolas Hasler	Liechtenstein	3	0	vs Greece (6 September 2013)	Booked in two 2014 World Cup qualifying matches
ST	Georgios Samaras	Greece	2	0	vs Liechtenstein (6 September 2013)	Booked in two 2014 World Cup qualifying matches
ST	Dimitrios Salpingidis	Greece	2	0	vs Liechtenstein (6 September 2013)	Booked in two 2014 World Cup qualifying matches
FW	Artjoms Rudņevs	Latvia	2	0	vs Greece (10 September 2013)	Booked in two 2014 World Cup qualifying matches
ST	Valērijs Šabala	Latvia	2	0	vs Greece (10 September 2013)	Booked in two 2014 World Cup qualifying matches
MF	Mindaugas Panka	Lithuania	3	0	vs Liechtenstein (10 September 2013)	Booked in two 2014 World Cup qualifying matches
MF	David Hasler	Liechtenstein	2	1	vs Lithuania (10 September 2013)	Sent off in a 2014 World Cup qualifying match
MF	José Holebas	Greece	3	1	vs Latvia (10 September 2013)	Sent off in a 2014 World Cup qualifying match
MF	Sandro Wieser	Liechtenstein	2	0	vs Bosnia and Herzegovina (11 October 2013)	Booked in two 2014 World Cup qualifying matches
MF	Konstantinos Katsouranis	Greece	3	1	vs Slovakia (11 October 2013)	Sent off in a 2014 World Cup qualifying match
MF	Giannis Maniatis	Greece	2	0	vs Liechtenstein (15 October 2013)	Booked in two 2014 World Cup qualifying matches
MF	Vladimir Weiss	Slovakia	2	0	vs Latvia (15 October 2013)	Booked in two 2014 World Cup qualifying matches
MF	Miroslav Stoch	Slovakia	2	0	vs Latvia (15 October 2013)	Booked in two 2014 World Cup qualifying matches
DF	Tomáš Hubočan	Slovakia	2	0	vs Latvia (15 October 2013)	Booked in two 2014 World Cup qualifying matches
MF	Panagiotis Kone	Greece	2	0	vs Romania (15 November 2013)	Booked in two 2014 World Cup qualifying matches
