= Pavol Gostič =

Slovak footballer (born 1966)

Personal information
- Date of birth: 5 November 1966 (age 59)
- Place of birth: Slovakia
- Position: Forward

Senior career*
Years	Team	Apps	(Gls)
1985	Tesla Stropkov		
1986–1988	Slovan Bratislava		
1988–1989	Dukla Banská Bystrica		
1990–1994	Slovan Bratislava		
1994–1995	VSS Košice		
1995	Inter Bratislava		
1995	Lokomotíva Košice		
1996	VSS Košice		
1996–1998	Petržalka		
1998	DAC Dunajská Streda		

International career
1994–1995	Slovakia	2	(0)
- * Club domestic league appearances and goals

Pavol Gostič (born 5 November 1966) is a Slovak former footballer who played as a forward.

== Early life ==
Gostič grew up idolizing Czechoslovakia international Marián Masný.

== Club career ==
Gostič was part of what was regarded as the successful 1990s Slovan Bratislava generation of players and helped the club win the last Czechoslovak league title and the first Slovak league title. He formed an attacking trio with Slovakia internationals Jaroslav Timko and Peter Dubovský.

== International career ==
Gostič played for the Slovakia national team.

== Style of play ==
Gostič mainly operated as a forward and was known for his fast feet and diving trick called "Gostič's bicycle", which helped Slovan gain penalty kicks.

== Managerial career ==
After retiring from professional football, Gostič worked as a youth manager.

== Personal life ==
Gostič has been a supporter of Slovak side Slovan.
