= Mathias Christen =

Liechtensteiner footballer

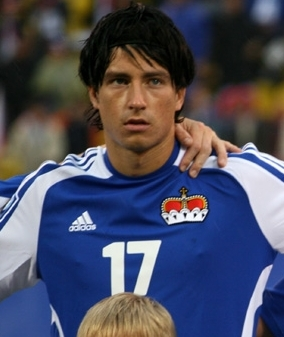
- Christen lining up with Liechtenstein in 2009

Personal information
- Date of birth: 18 August 1987 (age 39)
- Place of birth: Vaduz, Liechtenstein
- Position: Midfielder

Senior career*
| Years | Team | Apps | (Gls) |
| 2004–2005 | FC Triesen | | |
| 2005–2008 | FC Balzers | | |
| 2008–2009 | FC Wil | 14 | (4) |
| 2009 | FC Gossau | 3 | (0) |
| 2009–2010 | FC Vaduz | 11 | (4) |
| 2010–2012 | FC Linth 04 | | |
| 2012–2013 | USV Eschen/Mauren | 24 | (3) |
| 2013–2014 | Singhtarua | | |
| 2014 | FC Triesenberg | | |
| 2014–2015 | Chur 97 | 17 | (6) |
| 2015–2016 | FC Triesenberg | | |
| 2016 | FC Vaduz II | | |
| 2017 | FC St. Margrethen | | |
| 2017–2018 | USV Eschen/Mauren | 5 | (1) |

International career
| 2008–2014 | Liechtenstein | 36 | (2) |
- * Club domestic league appearances and goals

Mathias Christen (born 18 August 1987) is a Liechtensteiner former international footballer who played as a midfielder.

== Career ==
Born in Vaduz, Christen has played club football in Switzerland, Liechtenstein and Thailand for FC Triesen, FC Balzers, FC Wil, FC Gossau, FC Vaduz, FC Linth 04, USV Eschen/Mauren, Singhtarua and FC Triesenberg.

He made his international debut for Liechtenstein in 2008, and he has appeared in FIFA World Cup qualifying matches for them. He scored his first international goal against Bosnia and Herzegovina during the 2014 FIFA World Cup qualifying campaign.

== Career statistics ==
=== International ===
Appearances and goals by national team and year
| National team | Year | Apps | Goals |
|---|---|---|---|
| Liechtenstein | 2008 | 5 | 0 |
| Liechtenstein | 2009 | 7 | 0 |
| Liechtenstein | 2010 | 2 | 0 |
| Liechtenstein | 2011 | 4 | 0 |
| Liechtenstein | 2012 | 6 | 1 |
| Liechtenstein | 2013 | 10 | 1 |
| Liechtenstein | 2014 | 2 | 0 |
| Total | | 36 | 1 |

Scores and results list Liechtenstein's goal tally first, score column indicates score after each Christen goal.

List of international goals scored by Mathias Christen
| No. | Date | Venue | Opponent | Score | Result | Competition |
|---|---|---|---|---|---|---|
| 1 | 7 September 2012 | Rheinpark Stadion, Vaduz, Liechtenstein | Bosnia and Herzegovina | 1–5 | 1–8 | 2014 FIFA World Cup qualification |
| 2 | 14 August 2013 | Rheinpark Stadion, Vaduz, Liechtenstein | Croatia | 1–1 | 2–3 | Friendly |
