= Radovan Kulík =

Slovak footballer

Personal information
- Full name: Radovan Kulík
- Date of birth: 3 August 1983 (age 43)
- Place of birth: Czechoslovakia
- Height: 1.77 m (5 ft 10 in)
- Position: Midfielder

Team information
- Current team: FK Sitno Banská Štiavnica

Youth career
- FK Dukla Banská Bystrica

Senior career*
| Years | Team | Apps | (Gls) |
| 2002–2009 | Banská Bystrica | 114 | (13) |
| 2008–2009 | → Dubnica loan | 4 | (0) |
| 2009 | → Podbrezová loan | 4 | (0) |
| 2010 | → Ružiná loan | | |
| 2011–2012 | → Lučenec loan | 40 | (7) |
| 2012– | FK Sitno Banská Štiavnica | | |
- * Club domestic league appearances and goals as of 1 June 2012 ‡ National team caps and goals as of 3 April 2011

Radovan Kulík (born 3 August 1983) is a Slovak football midfielder who currently plays for FK Sitno Banská Štiavnica. His former club was FK LAFC Lučenec.
