= Viktor Pečovský =

Slovak footballer

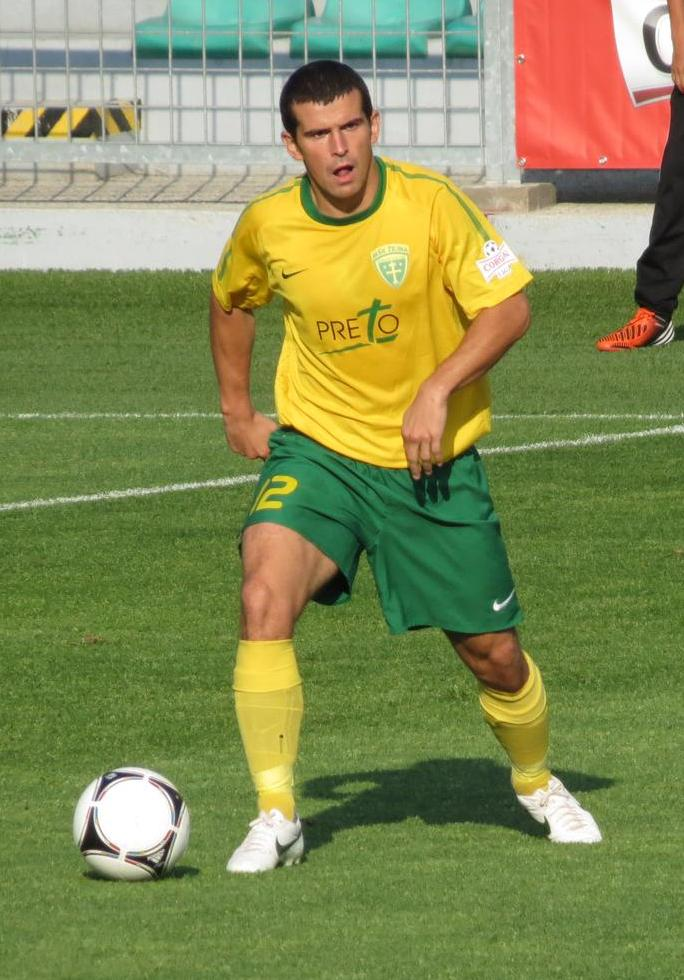

Personal information
- Full name: Viktor Pečovský
- Date of birth: 24 May 1983 (age 43)
- Place of birth: Brezno, Czechoslovakia
- Height: 1.71 m (5 ft 7 in)
- Position: Midfielder

Team information
- Current team: MFK Bytča

Youth career
- TJ Tatran Čierny Balog
- 1998–2000: Dukla Banská Bystrica

Senior career*
Years	Team	Apps	(Gls)
2000–2011	Dukla Banská Bystrica	179	(6)
2011–2020	Žilina	195	(9)
2017–2020	Žilina B	22	(0)
2020–2021	Javorník Makov	10	(0)
2021–2022	Žilina B	8	(0)
2022–	Bytča	9	(1)

International career^{‡}
- Slovakia U18
2002	Slovakia U19		
2003	Slovakia U20		
2004–2005	Slovakia U21		
2012–2016	Slovakia	34	(1)

Managerial career
- 2025-: Žilina B
- * Club domestic league appearances and goals as of 30 June 2022 ‡ National team caps and goals as of 26 June 2016

Viktor Pečovský (Slovak pronunciation: [ˈʋiktɔr ˈpetʂɔwskiː]; born 24 May 1983) is a Slovak footballer who currently plays as a midfielder for amateur side of MFK Bytča.

== Club career ==
On 23 June 2011, Pečovský signed a 3-year contract with Žilina. Žilina is the second club in his professional career after his 11 years with Dukla Banská Bystrica.

Pečovský retired on 11 July 2020 at pod Dubňom in a fixture against Zemplín Michalovce, where he collected his final 11 minutes and his 422nd Slovak top division appearance, creating a new record in the process. The match concluded with a 5–0 victory and Pečovský was replaced in the 12th minute by Miroslav Gono following a goal by Patrik Iľko. Pečovský's record held until April 2022, when he was replaced by Tomáš Ďubek.

== International career ==
On 15 August 2012, he made his debut with the Slovak senior team in a 3–1 friendly win against Denmark in Odense. He scored his first goal for Slovakia on 6 September 2013 in a 1–0 away win against Bosnia and Herzegovina during a 2014 FIFA World Cup qualifier, in Zenica.

== International goal ==
#	Date	Venue	Opponent	Score	Result	Competition
1	6 September 2013	Bilino Polje, Zenica	Bosnia and Herzegovina	0–1	0–1	2014 FIFA World Cup qualifier

== Honours ==
=== Dukla Banská Bystrica ===
- Slovak Cup (1): 2004–05

=== MŠK Žilina ===
- Fortuna Liga (2): 2011–12, 2016-17
- Slovnaft Cup (1): 2011–12

=== International ===
- UEFA European Under-19 Football Championship: 3rd place (2002)

=== Individual ===
- Fortuna Liga Player of the Year 2014–15
