= Patrik Kaminský =

Slovak footballer

Personal information
- Date of birth: 27 October 1978 (age 48)
- Place of birth: Prešov, Czechoslovakia
- Height: 1.89 m (6 ft 2 in)
- Position: Centre back

Team information
- Current team: Lokomotíva Košice
- Number: 3

Youth career
- Tatran Prešov

Senior career*
Years	Team	Apps	(Gls)
2001–2005	Ličartovce		
2005–2009	MFK Košice	80	(3)
2010	FK Bodva		
2010–2011	Odeva Lipany		
2011–	Lokomotíva Košice		
- * Club domestic league appearances and goals as of 2 August 2011

Patrik Kaminský (born 27 October 1978 in Prešov) is a professional Slovak football defender who currently plays for the 3. liga club FC Lokomotíva Košice.

== Career statistics ==
Club	Season	League		Domestic Cup		Europe		Total	
Club	Season	Pld	GF	Pld	GF	Pld	GF	Pld	GF
MFK Košice	2006/07	28	0	1	0	0	0	29	0
MFK Košice	2007/08	20	0	4	0	0	0	24	0
MFK Košice	2008/09	20	2	4	0	0	0	24	2
MFK Košice	2009/10	12	1	4	0	3	0	19	1
Total		80	3	13	0	3	0	96	3

^{Last updated: 28 December 2009}
