= Ondrej Debnár =

Slovak footballer

Personal information
- Full name: Ondrej Debnár
- Date of birth: 18 June 1972 (age 54)
- Place of birth: Zvolen, Czechoslovakia
- Height: 1.78 m (5 ft 10 in)
- Position: Centre back

Team information
- Current team: MFK Lokomotíva Zvolen
- Number: 3

Youth career
- OFK Očová
- MFK Detva
- Banská Bystrica B

Senior career*
Years	Team	Apps	(Gls)
- MFK Detva
1993–2002	Petržalka	168	(5)
2002–2003	Ružomberok	5	(0)
2003–2004	Elazığspor	20	(1)
2004	Sopron	11	(2)
2005–2007	Petržalka	53	(3)
2007–2009	Banská Bystrica	49	(2)
2009–2025	Zvolen		

International career^{‡}
2002–2003	Slovakia	4	(0)
- * Club domestic league appearances and goals as of 1 April 2012 ‡ National team caps and goals as of 1 April 2012

Ondrej Debnár (born 18 June 1972 in Zvolen) is a Slovak professional footballer who currently plays for MFK Lokomotíva Zvolen. He was a captain of FK Dukla.

Debnár grew up playing football in his hometown of Očová, and during his youth he also played for Detva. He played the largest part of his club career in the Artmedia Petržalka jersey, in which team he achieved his greatest playing successes: the league title, the cup and participation in the Champions League.

== Club career ==
In July 2003 he became a new signing for the Turkish club Elazigspor where he spent one season in the Turkish Super Liga with the club. Later, Debnár played in Hungary for Matáv Šopron. After returning to Slovakia, he played again for Artmedia and later for Dukla Banská Bystrica. He was the captain of the team for two seasons and ended his career there after the 2008–09 season. In August 2009, Debnár continued his career in the second division club MFK Zvolen, where he also became an assistant coach. He played with the club until 2025. He holds the record for the most red cards in the Corgoň league, which he received eight.

== International career ==
Debnár has made four appearances for the full Slovakia national football team.
