= Tokajík =

- Municipality
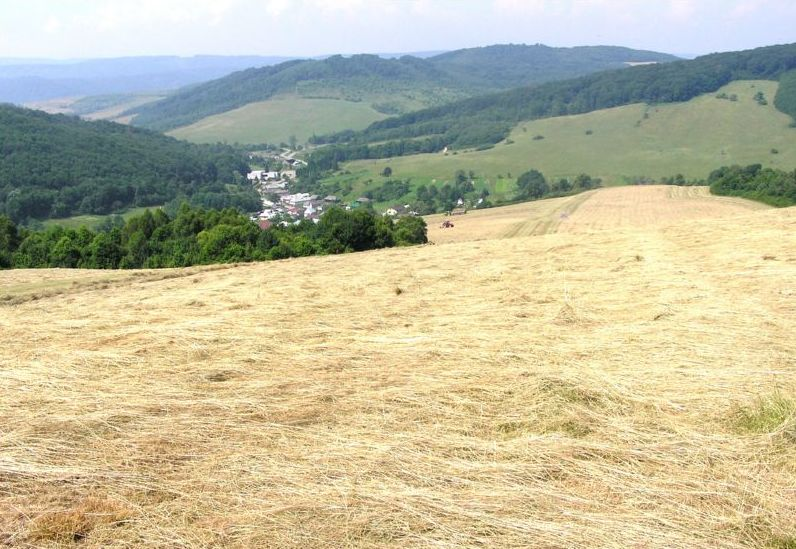

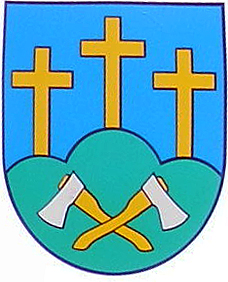
- Flag Coat of arms

- Location of Tokajík in the Prešov Region Location of Tokajík in Slovakia
- Coordinates: 49.12°N 21.72°E
- Country: Slovakia
- Region: Prešov Region
- District: Stropkov District
- First mentioned: 1430

Area
  - Total: 8.24 km^{2} (3.18 sq mi)
- Elevation: 211 m (692 ft)

Population (2025)
  - Total: 90
- Time zone: UTC+1 (CET)
  - Summer (DST): UTC+2 (CEST)
- Postal code: 903 4
- Area code: +421 54
- Vehicle registration plate (until 2022): SP
- Website: www.obectokajik.sk

Tokajík (Hungarian: Felsőtokaj) is a village and municipality in Stropkov District in the Prešov Region of north-eastern Slovakia.

== History ==
In historical records the village was first mentioned in 1430.

During World War II on November 20, 1944, Tokajík was burned by German troops as punishment for aid the inhabitants gave to the partisans. 32 men were shot 1 km North of the village the day before. Only 2, severely injured men from the village survived. The village was restored after war.

== Geography ==
The municipality lies at an altitude of 211 metres (692 ft) and covers an area of 8.24 km^{2} (3.18 sq mi) (2025).

== Transportation ==
There are 5 airports within 110 km of Tokajik.

== Population ==
Population statistic (10 years)
Year	1995	2005	2015	2025
Count	132	109	101	90
Difference		−17.42%	−7.33%	−10.89%

Population statistic
Year	2024	2025
Count	95	90
Difference		−5.26%

It has a population of 90 people (31 December 2025).

=== Ethnicity ===
Census 2021 (1+ %)
Ethnicity	Number	Fraction
Slovak	86	95.55%
Rusyn	13	14.44%
Total	90	

In year 2021 was 90 people by ethnicity 86 as Slovak and 13 as Rusyn.

Note on population: The difference values of population numbers in the table "Population statistic" and in the sections "Ethnicity" & "Religion" is caused by the use of various statistical methods.

=== Religion ===
Census 2021 (1+ %)
Religion	Number	Fraction
Greek Catholic Church	79	87.78%
Roman Catholic Church	10	11.11%
Eastern Orthodox Church	1	1.11%
Total	90	

In year 2021 was 90 people by religion 79 from Greek Catholic Church, 10 from Roman Catholic Church and 1 from Eastern Orthodox Church.
