= Martin Jakubko =

Slovak footballer (born 1980)

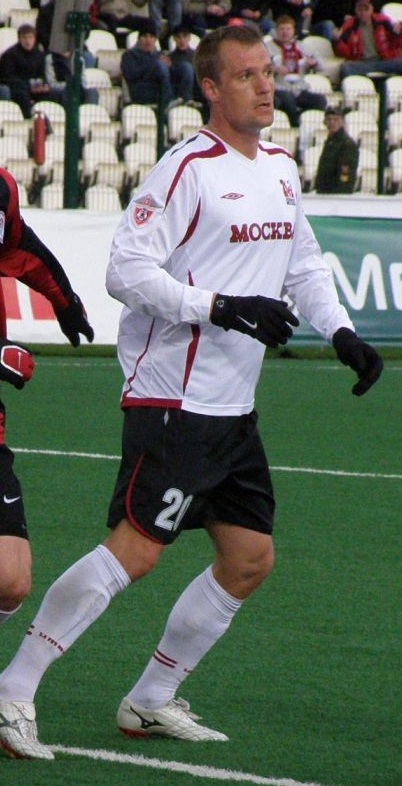
- Jakubko with FC Moscow in 2009

Personal information
- Date of birth: 26 February 1980 (age 46)
- Place of birth: Chminianska Nová Ves, Czechoslovakia
- Height: 1.94 m (6 ft 4 in)
- Position: Forward

Youth career
- Chminianska Nová Ves
- Slovan Sabinov
- Odeva Lipany

Senior career*
Years	Team	Apps	(Gls)
1999–2003	Tatran Prešov	23	(0)
2002	→ Bukocel Vranov (loan)		
2003–2006	Dukla Banská Bystrica	58	(25)
2006–2008	Saturn Moscow Oblast	25	(4)
2008	→ Khimki (loan)	15	(2)
2009	FC Moscow	23	(8)
2010	Saturn Moscow Oblast	12	(0)
2010	Dynamo Moscow	11	(0)
2011	Dukla Banská Bystrica	28	(13)
2012–2015	Amkar Perm	65	(9)
2015–2016	Ružomberok	28	(6)
2017	Sokol Chminianská Nová Ves	0	(0)

International career
2004–2015	Slovakia	41	(9)
- * Club domestic league appearances and goals

Martin Jakubko (born 26 February 1980) is a Slovak former professional footballer who played as a forward. He played for the Slovakia national team 41 times and scored 9 goals.

== Career ==
Jakubko is a youth product of Sabinova and Lipian. In 2003, he spent time in China, trialling with Chinese club Guangzhou Evergrande, but the experience did not culminate in a transfer. He returned to Tatran Prešov, where he took part in a players' strike due to the non-payment of wages. On 13 January 2004, he signed for Dukla Banska Bystrica.

On 30 November 2004, Jakubko made his debut for the Slovak national team in a 1–0 victory against Hungary at the 2004 King's Cup. He scored his first international goal against Poland in friendly match on 7 February 2007. During the 2010 FIFA World Cup qualification he played six games and helped to qualify for the tournament, scoring two goals. Jakubko played at the 2010 FIFA World Cup, making a substitute appearance in a 2–1 loss against the Netherlands. He earned a penalty kick, which was successfully converted by Róbert Vittek as the last action of the match.

== Career statistics ==
Scores and results list Slovakia's goal tally first, score column indicates score after each Jakubko goal.

List of international goals scored by Martin Jakubko
No.	Date	Venue	Opponent	Score	Result	Competition
1	7 February 2007	Estadio Municipal de Chapín, Jerez, Spain	Poland	1–0	2–2	Friendly
2	24 March 2007	GSP Stadium, Nicosia, Cyprus	Cyprus	3–1	3–1	UEFA Euro 2008 qualifying
3	10 September 2008	Ljudski Vrt, Maribor, Slovenia	Slovenia	1–2	1–2	2010 FIFA World Cup qualification
4	6 June 2009	Tehelné pole, Bratislava, Slovakia	San Marino	6–0	7–0	2010 FIFA World Cup qualification
5	15 August 2012	TRE-FOR Park, Odense, Denmark	Denmark	1–1	3–1	Friendly
6	11 September 2012	Pasienky, Bratislava, Slovakia	Liechtenstein	2–0	2–0	2014 FIFA World Cup qualification
7	23 March 2013	Štadión pod Dubňom, Žilina, Slovakia	Lithuania	1–1	1–1	2014 FIFA World Cup qualification
8	15 October 2013	Skonto Stadium, Riga, Latvia	Latvia	1–0	2–2	2014 FIFA World Cup qualification
9	5 March 2014	Netanya Stadium, Netanya, Israel	Israel	1–0	3–1	Friendly
