= Stropkov =

- Municipality
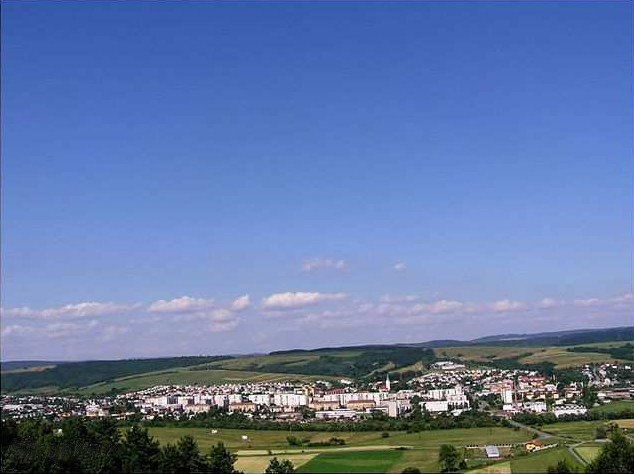
- View of Stropkov

- Flag Coat of arms

- Location of Stropkov in the Prešov Region Location of Stropkov in Slovakia
- Coordinates: 49.20°N 21.65°E
- Country: Slovakia
- Region: Prešov Region
- District: Stropkov District
- First mentioned: 1245

Government
  - Mayor: JUDr. Ondrej Brendza

Area
  - Total: 24.66 km^{2} (9.52 sq mi)
- Elevation: 190 m (620 ft)

Population (2025)
  - Total: 9,660
- Time zone: UTC+1 (CET)
  - Summer (DST): UTC+2 (CEST)
- Postal code: 910 1
- Area code: +421 54
- Vehicle registration plate (until 2022): SP
- Website: www.stropkov.sk

Stropkov (Slovak pronunciation: [ˈstrɔpkɔw]; Rusyn: Стропків, Hungarian: Sztropkó, pronounced [ˈstropkoː]; Yiddish: סטראפקאוו; German: Stroppkau) is a town in Stropkov District, Prešov Region, Slovakia.

== Geography ==
The municipality lies at an altitude of 190 metres (620 ft) and covers an area of 24.66 km^{2} (9.52 sq mi) (2025).

== History ==
The first written data about the town is from 1404, when Stropkov was already labeled as an oppidum (a townlet). The first owner of the town after the king was Ladislav Svatojursky. In order, the other landlords were Balickovci, Perinskovci, Peteovci. In 1408, the town's toll and castle (castellum) were mentioned for the first time. The development of the town and its economic expansion was supported by the law of thirty and market in 1698, which was strengthened by Leopold I with six annual fairs. Stropkov's manor owned about 51 villages at that time. In a big department, which articles date to 1575, jewelers, tailors, butchers, cabinetmakers, saddlers, swordfish, surgeons (shavers), and shopkeepers were united. Craftsmen from Stropkov sold their products in local markets in Stropkov, and also markets in Zemplén and Šariš.

In the process of successful development, Stropkov was touched by the status’ rebellions of Imre Thököly and Ferenc II Rákóczi: in the region list from 1715, it is written that only 7 bourgeoises paid taxes in Stropkov. In 1764, the Peteovci family died out, and the manor was divided into 6 parts: Staraiovci, Hallerovci, Keglevicovci, Dezofiovci, Veceiovci and Barkociovci. In 1785, Stropkov had 1326 inhabitants, comprising about 204 households. Stropkov was the third most populous town in the Zemplén region with 87 craftsmen in 1778, and it was the second most important craftsman center after Humenné town. In that period, it became a residence of Zemplén chair. This situation lasted in the next few years: 1848, 1918 and 1945, up until 1960.

After the 18th century, the town started to decay. In 1828, there were 201 houses and 2250 inhabitants. In 1869, there were 2502 inhabitants, which decreased to 2276 in 1900. After 1870, there was mass emigration of native people who were moving abroad.

During the time between wars, Stropkov and its district belonged to one of the most underdeveloped and poorest regions in Slovakia. Besides agriculture, the living was earned by the traditional craft industry and works in the woods. During the years of the Second World War, economical decline was fully in progress. Stropkov had 487 houses with 3311 inhabitants during the wartime. After the war, the construction of a Tesla factory and many other firms have had an important contribution to essential changes in demographics and in infrastructure. In 1950, 2695 people lived in the town, which grew to 9719 in 1991.

The first written information about the school is from 1515, but indisputably the school was there in the previous century. In the 17th century, Franciscans came to the town and in 1921, the first redemptorist cloister was founded.

The remains of the castle are situated in the storied building that occupies the east side of the church. The Roman Catholic church, called the Holy Body of Jesus Christ, dates to the 14th century. In 1675, it was restored and supplemented with a Gothic castle chapel. The interior Baroque decoration is from the 18th century. The Uniate cathedral was built in 1947 and Jewish synagogues have not been preserved.

The Domaša reservoir is 20 kilometres (12 miles) away from Stropkov. The nearby village of Tokajík is famous for the memorial of victims who died in the Tokajík tragedy in 1944.

== Population ==
Population statistic (10 years)
Year	1995	2005	2015	2025
Count	10,499	10,829	10,713	9660
Difference		+3.14%	−1.07%	−9.82%

Population statistic
Year	2024	2025
Count	9683	9660
Difference		−0.23%

It has a population of 9660 people (31 December 2025).

=== Ethnicity ===
Census 2021 (1+%)
Ethnicity	Number	Fraction
Slovak	8633	85.75%
Not found out	977	9.7%
Rusyn	922	9.15%
Romani	491	4.87%
Total	10,067	

In year 2021 was 10,067 people by ethnicity 8633 as Slovak, 977 as Not found out, 922 as Rusyn, 491 as Romani, 44 as Ukrainian, 40 as Czech, 36 as Other, 22 as Russian, 20 as Polish, 15 as Hungarian, 6 as Italian, 4 as Vietnamese, 4 as Serbian, 4 as English, 3 as Irish, 3 as German, 2 as Korean, 1 as Moravian and 1 as Bulgarian.

Note on population: The difference values of population numbers in the table "Population statistic" and in the sections "Ethnicity" & "Religion" is caused by the use of various statistical methods.

=== Religion ===
Census 2021 (1+%)
Religion	Number	Fraction
Roman Catholic Church	5315	52.8%
Greek Catholic Church	2531	25.14%
Not found out	969	9.63%
None	739	7.34%
Eastern Orthodox Church	360	3.58%
Total	10,067	

In year 2021 was 10,067 people by religion 5315 from Roman Catholic Church, 2531 from Greek Catholic Church, 969 from Not found out, 739 from None, 360 from Eastern Orthodox Church, 38 from Evangelical Church, 28 from Ad hoc movements, 17 from Other, 14 from Calvinist Church, 12 from Jehovah's Witnesses, 10 from Islam, 9 from Other and not ascertained christian church, 6 from Buddhism, 5 from Paganism and natural spirituality, 4 from Christian Congregations in Slovakia, 3 from Old Catholic Church, 2 from Church of the Brethren, 2 from Baptists Church, 2 from Apostolic Church and 1 from Czechoslovak Hussite Church.

== Jewish community ==
Jews first arrived in Stropkov, possibly fleeing Polish pogroms, in about 1650. About fifty years later, the Jews were exiled from Stropkov to Tisinec, a village just to the north. They did not return to Stropkov until about 1800. The Stropkov Jewish cemetery was dedicated in 1892, after which the Tisinec cemetery fell into disuse.

In 1939, the antisemitic Hlinka Party gained control of the Stropkov Town Council. From May–October 1942 the Hlinka deported Jews from the Stropkov area to Auschwitz, Sobibor, Maidanek, and "unknown destinations". By the end of World War II, only 100 Jews remained in Stropkov out of 2000 in 1942.

=== Chief Rabbis of Stropkov ===
The first rabbi of Tisinec and Stropkov was Moshe Schonfeld. He left Stropkov for a position in Vranov. He was succeeded in 1833 by Yekusiel Yehudah Teitelbaum (I) (1818–1883) who served as Stropkov's chief rabbi until leaving for a post in Ujhely. The next incumbent was Chaim Yosef Gottlieb (1790–1867), known as the "Stropkover Rov". He was succeeded by Yechezkel Shraga Halberstam (1811–1899), a son of Rabbi Chaim Halberstam of Sanz. Moshe Yosef Teitelbaum (1842–1897), the son of the aforementioned Yekusiel Yehuda Teitelbaum, was appointed as Stropkov's next chief rabbi in 1880.

Yitzhak Hersh Amsel (c1855–1934), the son of Peretz Amsel of Stropkov, was first appointed as a dayan in Stropkov and then as the rabbi of Zborov (near Bardejov). Legend states that Rabbi Yitzhak Hersh Amsel died while praying in his Zborov synagogue. He is buried in the Stropkov cemetery where a small protective building ohel was erected over his grave to preserve it. Amsel was succeeded in 1897 by Avraham Shalom Halberstam (1856–1940). Halberstam served in Stropkov for some forty years, until the early 1930s, when he assumed a rabbinical post in the larger town of Košice. Menachem Mendel Halberstam (1873–1954), the son of the aforementioned Avraham Shalom Halberstam, was then appointed chief rabbi of Stropkov and head of the Talmud Torah. After World War II, Menachem Mendel Halberstam lived in New York until the end of his life, teaching at the Stropkover Yeshiva, which he founded in Williamsburg, Brooklyn.

The present day Admor of Stropkov is HaRav Avraham Shalom Halberstam of Jerusalem. The Admor runs several yeshivas and kolelim in Jerusalem and other cities in Israel. The Admor dedicates himself to Ahavat Yisrael and to helping many who need to return to their Jewish roots.

== Institutions ==
- Schools
- Library
- TIC – Tourist Information Centre
- Association for people with mental illness

== Factory ==
- Tesla, a.s. Stropkov

== Monuments ==
- Roman Catholic Gothic church (14th–15th century)
- Stropkov Castle
- Church of St. Francis
- Gothic and Renaissance châteaux

== Culture and interests ==
- Zoopark
- Newspaper Spektrum
- The oldest pilgrimage site in Slovakia in honor of Our Lady of Carmel / Scapulary - The Brotherhood of the Holy Scapular in the Roman Catholic Church of the Most Holy Body and Blood of Christ in Stropkov 05.11.1669 approved the bull of Pope Clement IX .. Saints-day is held every year on the date 7/16 ..

== Notable people ==
Notable people from Stropkov include the footballers Juraj Čobej, Pavol Safranko and Ľuboš Reiter, referee Ľuboš Micheľ, singers Marika Gombitová and Beáta Dubasová.

== Twin towns — sister cities ==
Stropkov is twinned with:

- Biłgoraj, Poland
- Ropczyce, Poland
- Korczyna, Poland
- Bílina, Czech Republic
- Palamuse, Estonia
