= Daniel Tchuř =

Czech footballer

Personal information
- Full name: Daniel Tchuř
- Date of birth: 8 August 1976 (age 50)
- Place of birth: Ostrava-Zábřeh, Czechoslovakia
- Height: 1.78 m (5 ft 10 in)
- Position: Midfielder

Youth career
- 1985–1995: TJ Vítkovice

Senior career*
Years	Team	Apps	(Gls)
1995–1996	VTJ Znojmo		
1996–1998	FC Vítkovice		
1998	TJ Nový Jičín		
1998–2000	FC Vítkovice		
2000–2004	SK Slavia Praha		
2001–2002	→ FK Mladá Boleslav (loan)	1	(0)
2002–2003	→ Újpest FC (loan)	14	(0)
2004–2007	FC Artmedia Bratislava	85	(5)
2007–2010	FC Baník Ostrava	62	(2)
2010–2011	MFK Karviná	10	(0)

International career
1993	Czech Republic U-17	3	(0)
1994	Czech Republic U-18	4	(1)
- * Club domestic league appearances and goals as of 6 June 2011

Daniel Tchuř (born 8 August 1976) is a former Czech footballer.

Daniel is a product of FC Vítkovice. He did his military service in Znojmo before returning north to Ostrava again. SK Slavia Praha showed interest for him then so he moved there. Via FK Mladá Boleslav and Újpest FC he ended up with FC Baník Ostrava. In 2010, he moved to regional Second League side, MFK Karviná.
