= ŠK Aqua Turčianske Teplice =

ŠK Aqua
- Full name: ŠK Aqua Turčianske Teplice
- Founded: 1911
- Dissolved: 2011
- Ground: AQUA Stadium, Turčianske Teplice
- Capacity: 2,000
Home colours	Away colours

ŠK Aqua Turčianske Teplice was a Slovak football team, based in the town of Turčianske Teplice.

The club was founded in 1911 as Baník Turčianske Teplice and in 1998 was renamed into ŠK Aqua Turčianske Teplice. In 2011, the club was dissolved due to financial problems.
