= Tisinec =

- Municipality
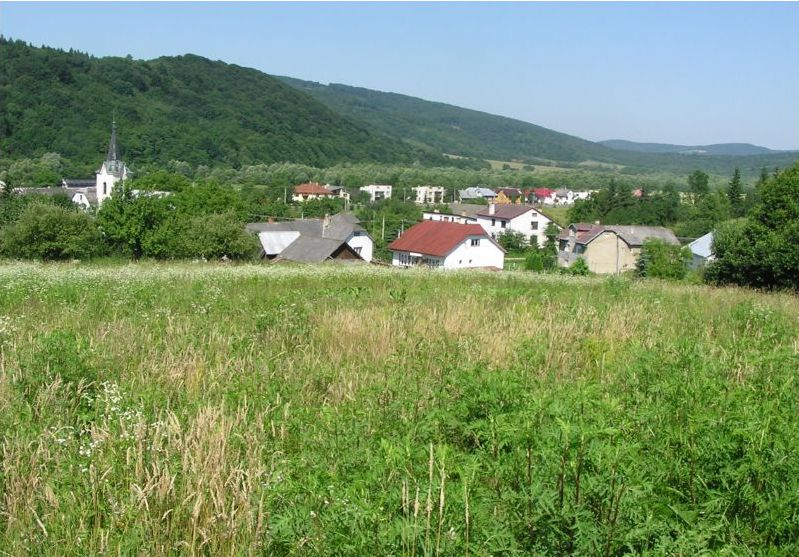

- Flag

- Location of Tisinec in the Prešov Region Location of Tisinec in Slovakia
- Coordinates: 49.23°N 21.63°E
- Country: Slovakia
- Region: Prešov Region
- District: Stropkov District
- First mentioned: 1379

Government
  - Mayor: Patrik Pališin (Independent)

Area
  - Total: 3.75 km^{2} (1.45 sq mi)
- Elevation: 192 m (630 ft)

Population (2025)
  - Total: 487
- Time zone: UTC+1 (CET)
  - Summer (DST): UTC+2 (CEST)
- Postal code: 910 1
- Area code: +421 54
- Vehicle registration plate (until 2022): SP
- Website: tisinec.sk

Tisinec (Hungarian: Tizsény) is a village and municipality in Stropkov District in the Prešov Region of north-eastern Slovakia.

== History ==
In historical records the village was first mentioned in 1379.

== Geography ==
The municipality lies at an altitude of 192 metres (630 ft) and covers an area of 3.75 km^{2} (1.45 sq mi) (2025).

=== Climate ===
The Köppen Climate Classification subtype for this climate is "Dfb" (Warm Summer Continental Climate).

Climate data for Tisinec (1991−2020)
Month	Jan	Feb	Mar	Apr	May	Jun	Jul	Aug	Sep	Oct	Nov	Dec	Year
Record high °C (°F)	12.4 (54.3)	15.3 (59.5)	23.8 (74.8)	29.0 (84.2)	32.6 (90.7)	35.2 (95.4)	36.0 (96.8)	36.9 (98.4)	35.8 (96.4)	26.0 (78.8)	23.2 (73.8)	12.6 (54.7)	36.9 (98.4)
Mean daily maximum °C (°F)	0.6 (33.1)	3.1 (37.6)	9.0 (48.2)	16.2 (61.2)	20.9 (69.6)	24.2 (75.6)	26.2 (79.2)	26.2 (79.2)	20.5 (68.9)	14.2 (57.6)	7.6 (45.7)	1.5 (34.7)	14.2 (57.6)
Daily mean °C (°F)	−2.2 (28.0)	−0.8 (30.6)	3.6 (38.5)	9.6 (49.3)	14.1 (57.4)	17.8 (64.0)	19.4 (66.9)	18.8 (65.8)	13.7 (56.7)	8.8 (47.8)	4.1 (39.4)	−0.9 (30.4)	8.8 (47.8)
Mean daily minimum °C (°F)	−5.0 (23.0)	−4.2 (24.4)	−1.0 (30.2)	3.4 (38.1)	7.9 (46.2)	11.7 (53.1)	13.4 (56.1)	12.8 (55.0)	8.7 (47.7)	4.7 (40.5)	1.1 (34.0)	−3.3 (26.1)	4.2 (39.6)
Record low °C (°F)	−23.9 (−11.0)	−24.2 (−11.6)	−18.8 (−1.8)	−7.4 (18.7)	−4.9 (23.2)	3.1 (37.6)	4.7 (40.5)	4.2 (39.6)	−1.5 (29.3)	−9.3 (15.3)	−16.9 (1.6)	−25.8 (−14.4)	−25.8 (−14.4)
Average precipitation mm (inches)	34.5 (1.36)	36.6 (1.44)	32.7 (1.29)	44.5 (1.75)	79.5 (3.13)	87.6 (3.45)	106.7 (4.20)	73.1 (2.88)	61.9 (2.44)	56.6 (2.23)	40.8 (1.61)	38.1 (1.50)	692.5 (27.26)
Average precipitation days (≥ 1.0 mm)	8.9	8.1	7.0	8.0	11.0	9.7	10.6	8.1	8.3	8.2	7.9	9.0	104.7
Average snowy days	14.2	11.9	6.8	1.9	0.0	0.0	0.0	0.0	0.0	0.8	5.3	12.4	53.74
Average relative humidity (%)	84.5	80.6	73.1	68.1	73.0	74.1	74.7	75.6	79.9	82.2	84.7	86.8	78.1
Mean monthly sunshine hours	48.3	70.8	139.5	193.4	228.5	239.8	251.4	248.6	170.6	113.6	56.2	35.2	1,795.9
Source: NOAA

== Population ==
Population statistic (10 years)
Year	1995	2005	2015	2025
Count	337	427	375	487
Difference		+26.70%	−12.17%	+29.86%

Population statistic
Year	2024	2025
Count	484	487
Difference		+0.61%

It has a population of 487 people (31 December 2025).

=== Ethnicity ===
Census 2021 (1+ %)
Ethnicity	Number	Fraction
Slovak	467	97.69%
Rusyn	26	5.43%
Not found out	10	2.09%
Total	478	

In year 2021 was 478 people by ethnicity 467 as Slovak, 26 as Rusyn, 10 as Not found out, 2 as Polish, 2 as English, 1 as Czech and 1 as Other.

Note on population: The difference values of population numbers in the table "Population statistic" and in the sections "Ethnicity" & "Religion" is caused by the use of various statistical methods.

=== Religion ===
Census 2021 (1+ %)
Religion	Number	Fraction
Roman Catholic Church	345	72.18%
Greek Catholic Church	73	15.27%
None	26	5.44%
Eastern Orthodox Church	19	3.97%
Not found out	11	2.3%
Total	478	

In year 2021 was 478 people by religion 345 from Roman Catholic Church, 73 from Greek Catholic Church, 26 from None, 19 from Eastern Orthodox Church, 11 from Not found out, 2 from Evangelical Church, 1 from Other and 1 from Ad hoc movements.
