= Turčianske Teplice =

- Municipality
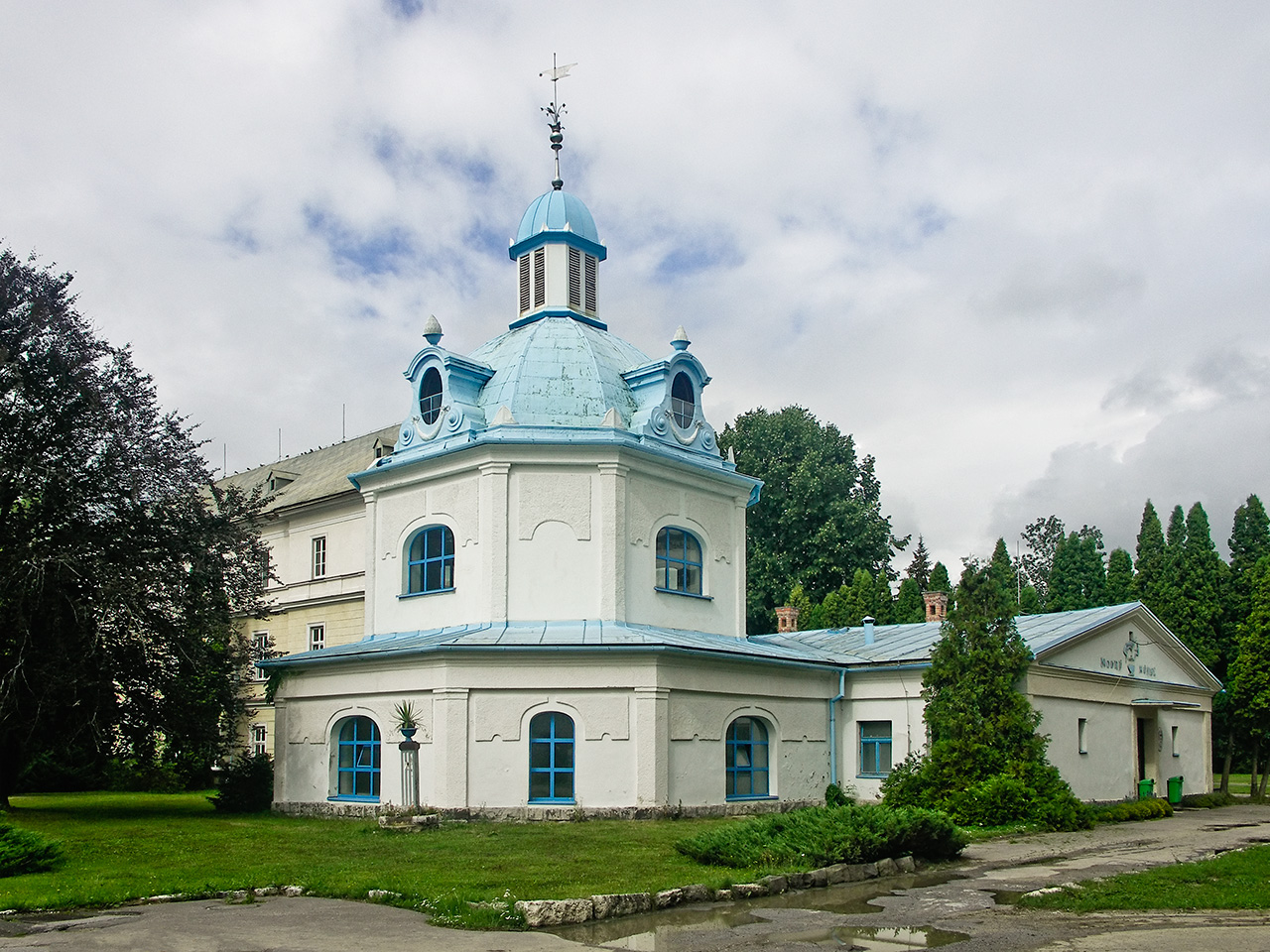
- Entrance to the spa in Turčianske Teplice

- Flag Coat of arms

- Location of Turčianske Teplice in the Žilina Region Location of Turčianske Teplice in Slovakia
- Coordinates: 48.86°N 18.86°E
- Country: Slovakia
- Region: Žilina Region
- District: Turčianske Teplice District
- First mentioned: 1281

Government
  - Mayor: Igor Hus

Area
  - Total: 33.48 km^{2} (12.93 sq mi)
- Elevation: 504 m (1,654 ft)

Population (2025)
  - Total: 5,996
- Time zone: UTC+1 (CET)
  - Summer (DST): UTC+2 (CEST)
- Postal code: 390 1
- Area code: +421 43
- Vehicle registration plate (until 2022): TR
- Website: www.turciansketeplice.sk

Turčianske Teplice (German: Bad Stuben; Hungarian: Stubnyafürdő) is a town in central Slovakia in the Žilina Region. It is about halfway between Martin and Kremnica. The town's population is around 6,500. The town was the historic center of the Upper Turiec subregion within the Turiec region (comitatus), and now enjoys the status of a capital of the Turčianske Teplice District.

== History ==
The town is one of the oldest spa towns in Europe, and was originally known as Štubnianske Teplice. It was first mentioned in text dating from 1281 when King Ladislaus IV of Hungary granted the lands surrounding the springs to a Count Peter. The spa became popular with royalty, including King Sigismund of Hungary and Emperor Maximilian I of Mexico. The recuperative abilities of the spa were first studied by the University of Halle medical student Jan Lisschoviny.

Before the establishment of independent Czechoslovakia in 1918, Štubnianske Teplice was part of Turóc County within the Kingdom of Hungary. From 1939 to 1945, it was part of the Slovak Republic. The town was renamed Turčianske Teplice in 1946. In 1951 Turčianske Teplice merged with the community of Vieska.

== Geography ==
The municipality lies at an altitude of 504 metres (1,654 ft) and covers an area of 33.48 km^{2} (12.93 sq mi) (2025). It lies in the Turiec Basin and is surrounded in proximity by the Greater Fatra, Kremnica, Žiar and Lesser Fatra mountain ranges.

The divisions of the town include:

- Diviaky (1951–1955 and 1971)
- Dolná Štubňa (incorporated in 1971)
- Turčiansky Michal (incorporated in 1971)
- Turčianske Teplice

== Population ==
Population statistic (10 years)
Year	1995	2005	2015	2025
Count	7239	6941	6504	5996
Difference		−4.11%	−6.29%	−7.81%

Population statistic
Year	2024	2025
Count	6069	5996
Difference		−1.20%

It has a population of 5996 people (31 December 2025).

=== Ethnicity ===
Census 2021 (1+ %)
Ethnicity	Number	Fraction
Slovak	5977	93.21%
Not found out	383	5.97%
Total	6412	

In year 2021 was 6412 people by ethnicity 5977 as Slovak, 383 as Not found out, 55 as Czech, 35 as German, 14 as Other, 10 as Rusyn, 10 as Russian, 8 as Hungarian, 7 as Chinese, 7 as Ukrainian, 7 as Polish, 3 as Italian, 3 as Romani, 3 as Greek, 2 as Serbian, 2 as Romanian, 2 as English, 1 as Turkish, 1 as Moravian and 1 as Croatian.

Note on population: The difference values of population numbers in the table "Population statistic" and in the sections "Ethnicity" & "Religion" is caused by the use of various statistical methods.

=== Religion ===
Census 2021 (1+ %)
Religion	Number	Fraction
Roman Catholic Church	2435	37.98%
None	1998	31.16%
Evangelical Church	1323	20.63%
Not found out	452	7.05%
Total	6412	

In year 2021 was 6412 people by religion 2435 from Roman Catholic Church, 1998 from None, 1323 from Evangelical Church, 452 from Not found out, 42 from Apostolic Church, 41 from Greek Catholic Church, 21 from Other, 18 from Ad hoc movements, 17 from United Methodist Church, 10 from Other and not ascertained christian church, 9 from Eastern Orthodox Church, 9 from Islam, 7 from Buddhism, 6 from Christian Congregations in Slovakia, 6 from Church of the Brethren, 5 from Jehovah's Witnesses, 3 from Paganism and natural spirituality, 3 from Hinduism, 3 from Seventh-day Adventist Church, 2 from Calvinist Church, 1 from Jewish community and 1 from Czechoslovak Hussite Church.

According to the 2001 census, the town had 7,031 inhabitants. 97.98% of inhabitants were Slovaks, 0.67% Czech and 0.37% Germans. The religious make-up was 48.09% Roman Catholics, 30.56% Lutherans, and 17.24% people with no religious affiliation.

== Twin towns — sister cities ==
Turčianske Teplice is twinned with:

- Holešov, Czech Republic
- Havířov, Czech Republic
- Skawina, Poland
- Wisła, Poland
- Aranđelovac, Serbia

== Notable people ==
- Mikuláš Galanda, a modern painter, graphic designer and illustrator.
- Jozef Lettrich, politician
