= Peter Burák =

Slovak footballer (born 1978)

Personal information
- Full name: Peter Burák
- Date of birth: 17 September 1978 (age 48)
- Place of birth: Nitra, Czechoslovakia
- Height: 1.73 m (5 ft 8 in)
- Position: Fullback

Youth career
- Nitra

Senior career*
Years	Team	Apps	(Gls)
1995–1999	Nitra	31	(0)
1997–1998	→Trenčín (loan)	16	(0)
2003–2009	Petržalka	163	(0)
2010	Nitra	10	(0)
- * Club domestic league appearances and goals as of 28 April 2012

Peter Burák (born 17 September 1978 in Nitra) is a Slovak football defender who played for FC Nitra, Artmedia Petržalka and FC Nitra.

== Domestic League Records ==
Year	Competition	Apps	Goal
2006–present	Corgon Liga	60	0
Total		60	0
