= Juraj Čobej =

Slovak footballer (born 1971)

Personal information
- Date of birth: 7 August 1971 (age 55)
- Place of birth: Stropkov, Czechoslovakia
- Height: 1.99 m (6 ft 6 in)
- Position: Goalkeeper

Youth career
- MŠK Tesla Stropkov

Senior career*
Years	Team	Apps	(Gls)
1996–1998	BŠK Bardejov	16	(0)
1998–1999	Artmedia Petržalka	15	(0)
1999–2000	Slovan Bratislava	5	(0)
2000–2008	Artmedia Petržalka	122	(0)
2010–2011	Partizán Bardejov		

International career
2006	Slovakia	1	(0)
- * Club domestic league appearances and goals

Juraj Čobej (born 7 August 1971) is a Slovak former professional footballer who played as a goalkeeper, spending most of his career with Artmedia Petržalka. He made a single appearance for Slovakia in 2006.

== Club career ==
Čobej featured as one of the most important players during Artmedia Petržalka's famous run to the lucrative group stage of the UEFA Champions League in 2005–06, after beating Kairat of Kazakhstan, Scottish side Celtic and Serbian outfit Partizan in the qualifying rounds. Čobej kept a clean sheet in the second qualifying round first leg against Celtic in a 5–0 win, which BBC News described as being among Celtic's "most embarrassing defeats ever".

He underwent brain surgery in the Kramáre district of Bratislava lasting for eight hours in December 2005, just days after playing the Champions League against Portuguese side Porto.

After his surgery, Čobej did not play in the Slovak First League - aside from a two-minute symbolic appearance on 31 May 2006 - until May 2007. He joined fourth-tier side Partizán Bardejov as a player-coach in March 2010. Čobej was head coach of amateur side Dlhá Lúka in 2014, who were playing in the fifth football league. In 2015 Čobej re-joined Bardejov's staff as assistant coach to Jozef Kukulský.

== International career ==
Čobej was named in the Slovakia squad to face Spain in the 2006 FIFA World Cup qualification – UEFA second round playoff in November 2005, but withdrew from the squad due to injury and was replaced by Marián Kelemen. Slovakia head coach Dušan Galis included Čobej in a 33-man squad in April 2006 ahead of a friendly match in Trnava. On 20 May 2006, Čobej played his first and only game for the Slovak national team, featuring for just two minutes against Belgium.

== Personal life ==
Čobej is married, has two daughters. Following the end of his football career, he settled in Bardejov.
