= Martin Mikulič =

Slovak footballer

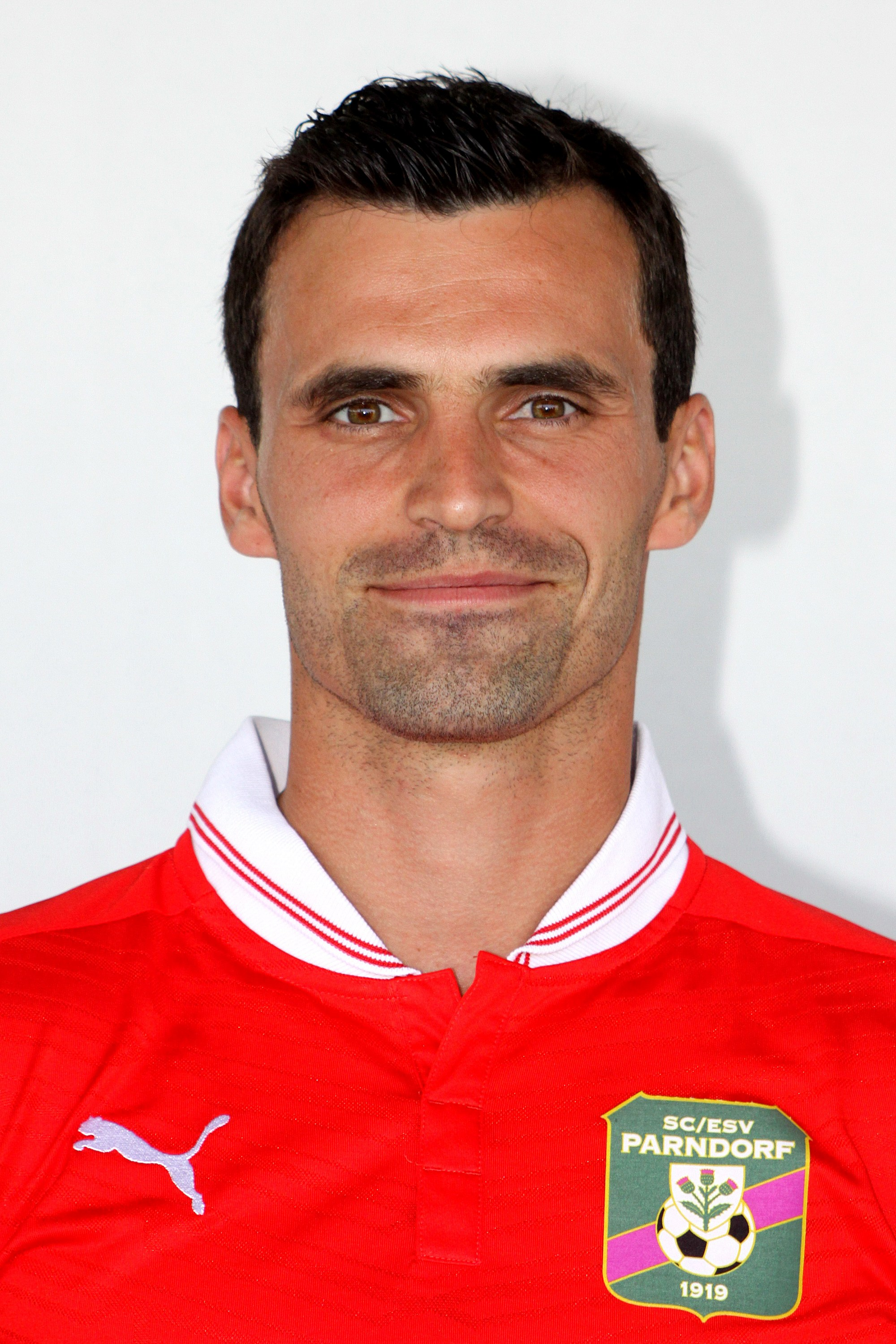

Personal information
- Full name: Martin Mikulič
- Date of birth: 14 March 1985 (age 41)
- Place of birth: Bratislava, Czechoslovakia
- Height: 1.80 m (5 ft 11 in)
- Position: Attacking midfielder

Team information
- Current team: Bruck/Leitha (assistant)

Youth career
- Artmedia Petržalka

Senior career*
Years	Team	Apps	(Gls)
2002–2011	Petržalka	132	(22)
2011–2013	SFM Senec	54	(17)
2013–2014	Parndorf	8	(0)
2014–2017	Bruck/Leitha	59	(26)
2017–	Bruck/Leitha II	30	(19)

Managerial career
- 2016–: Bruck/Leitha (assistant)
- * Club domestic league appearances and goals

Martin Mikulič (born 14 March 1985 in Bratislava) is a retired Slovak football striker and current assistant coach of Austrian club Bruck/Leitha.

Mikulič is an alumnus of Faculty of Physical Education and Sports at Comenius University. He appears in RTVS, Slovak public broadcaster, during televised national team or club international fixtures as well as major tournaments, like UEFA Euro 2020, as an expert analyst and panel member.
