= 2025–26 Slovak Cup =

Slovnaft Cup

Tournament details
- Country: Slovakia
- Dates: 18 July 2025 – 1 May 2026
- Teams: 292

Final positions
- Champions: Žilina (2nd title)
- Runners-up: Košice

The 2025–26 Slovak Cup was the 57th season of the annual Slovak football cup competition. It was sponsored by Slovnaft and known as the Slovnaft Cup for sponsorship purposes.

Slovak First Football League team Spartak Trnava were the defending champions, having defeated MFK Ružomberok in the previous season's final for their second overall title.

The winners of the cup qualified for the 2026–27 UEFA Europa League first qualifying round.

== Format ==
The Slovak Cup is played as a knockout tournament. All matches that end up as a draw after 90 minutes are decided by penalty shoot-outs. All rounds are played as one-off matches except the semi-finals, which are played over two legs.

== Teams ==
Round	Main date	New entries this round	Previous round winners	Number of fixtures	Clubs remaining
Preliminary round	26/27 July 2025	124	0	62	292
First round	6 August 2025	142	62	102	230
Second round	27 August 2025	26	102	64	128
Third round	24 September 2025	0	64	32	64
Fourth round	22 October 2025	0	32	16	32
Round of 16	19 November 2025	0	16	8	8
Quarter-finals	4 March 2026	0	8	4	4
Semi-finals	18 March and 15 April 2026	0	4	4	4
Final	1 May 2026	0	2	1	2

== Preliminary round ==
Team 1	Score	Team 2
18 July 2025
FK Veľký Cetín	2–4	TJ Nitrianske Hrnčiarovce
19 July 2025
TJ Tatran Uhrovec	0–0 (5–6 p)	TJ Priehrada Nitrianske Rudno
20 July 2025
ZFC 1939 Trenčín	1–0	TJ Považan Pruské
TJ Slovan Dolné Kočkovce	1–0	TJ Spartak Lysá pod Makytou
TJ Štart Tuchyňa	1–1 (1–4 p)	FK Košeca
OFK Veľké Ripňany	2–9	TJ Družstevník Jacovce
OŠK Bučany	1–2	TJ Iskra - Horné Orešany
TJ Družstevník Rišňovce	0–1	ŠK Veľké Zálužie
TJ Slovan Zbehy	0–0 (4–5 p)	OŠK Kolíňany
ŠK Nevidzany	0–0 (2–3 p)	TJ Slovan Nitra-Chrenová
TJ Sokol Borský Mikuláš	1–2 (3–5 p)	TJ Slovan Šaštín - Stráže
TJ Tatran Jablonica	0–2	TJ Družstevník Hlboké
TJ Salka	0–2	MŠK Želiezovce
FC Komoča	2–1	TJ Lokomotíva Bánov
ŠK Sokol Starý Tekov	4–1	ŠK Podlužany
ŠK Žitavany	1–2 (0–3 p)	Športové centrum Chynorany
TJ Sokol Brezovička	3–2	FK TJ Sokol Brezovica
TJ Poľana Šiba	2–3 (4–5 p)	TJ Družstevník Breznica
ŠK v obci Chmeľov	9–8	OFK Tatran Bystré
FK Široké	0–2	OTJ Jamník
TJ Baník Porač	0–2	FK 05 Levoča
FK Prakovce	1–1 (4–5 p)	MFK Gelnica
FK Ptava Ptičie	0–5	ŠK Slávia Lackovce
OFK Rakovec nad Ondavou	1–7	TJ Jasenov
OFK Lastomír	1–2	ŠK Nacina Ves
TJ Internacionál Hraň	2–1	FK II.Rakóczi Ferenc Borša
FK Košická Nová Ves	3–2	MFK Ťahanovce
OFK Perín	2–1	FK TATRA Sokoľany
ŠK Mokrance	3–4	TJ Dvorníky - Včeláre
FC Družstevník Rybky	2–5	TJ Iskra Holíč
TJ Baník Sebedražie	1–4	FK Iskra Nováky
Futbalový klub Senica	2–1	ŠFK Štefanov
23 July 2025
FK SEMEROVO	2–2 (2–4 p)	TJ Veľké Lovce
FC Nový Živo	2–1	TJ ŠM Janíky
26 July 2025
FK Malé Leváre	0–8	ŠK Závod
FK Šalková	3–2	TJ Prameň Dolná Strehová
ŠK Sásová	2–1	TJ Slovan Halič
TJ ŠK Hronec	0–3	FC 34 Liptovský Mikuláš - Palúdzka
ŠK Štiavnik	2–3	OFK Teplička nad Váhom
TJ Družstevník Kráľ	0–9	FK Jesenské
TJ Pokrok Stará Bystrica	4–1	TJ Novoť
TJ Máj Ružomberok-Černová	0–0 (4–3 p)	OŠK Švošov
OŠK RENOP Liptovská Teplá	2–0	ŠK Závažná Poruba
TJ Horný Hríčov	3–2	ŠK Belá
TJ Lovča	1–0	OFK Hliník nad Hroncom
27 July 2025
Obecný športový lub Láb	1–1 (0–3 p)	TJ Záhoran Jakubov
ŠK Záhorák Plavecký Mikuláš	1–3	TJ Veľké Leváre
OŠK Slovenský Grob	1–1 (6–5 p)	PŠC Pezinok
FK Veľká Lomnica	2–6	OFK Vikartovce
TJ Snaha Zborov nad Bystricou	1–2	Oravan Oravská Jasenica
TJ Slovan Dudince	3–2	TJ Slovan Tomášovce
FK 09 Bacúch	3–1	MF Jelšava
TJ Sokol Liesek	0–3	ŠK Tvrdošín
MFK Strojár Krupina	1–3	OFK Olováry
30 July 2025
MFK Záhorská Bystrica	3–4	Lokomotíva Devínska Nová Ves
FK Budmerice	2–8	ŠK Svätý Jur
ŠK Šenkvice	1–0	FK Slovan Most pri Bratislave
ŠK Bernolákovo	1–1 (2–4 p)	TJ Malinovo
FK Kozmos	0–4	FK Karpaty Limbach
2 August 2025
ŠK Igram	3–1	ŠK Báhoň
3 August 2025
FK Slovan Žabokreky	1–2	TJ Višnové
TJ Turčan Košťany	0–3	FK Fatran Varín

== First round ==
Team 1	Score	Team 2
26 July 2025
TJ Družstevník Breznica	4–1	OFK - SIM Raslavíce
FC Slovan Hlohovec	0–1	FC Pata
FC Topoľčany	1–2	PFK Piešťany
27 July 2025
TJ Internacionál Hraň	0–5	MFK Snina
TJ Sokol Brezovička	2–4	ŠK Odeva Lipany
TJ Dvorníky - Včeláre	2–0	MFK Spartak Medzev
FK 05 Levoča	0–4	MFK Slovan Sabinov
TJ Spartak Kvašov	0–3	Spartak Dubnica nad Váhom
FK Junior Kanianka	2–1	TJ Partizán Domaniža
TJ Slovan Brvnište	1–1 (3–5 p)	ŠK LR CRYSTAL
TJ Slovan Košecké Podhradie	5–2	AFC Nové Mesto nad Váhom
Horné Saliby/Tomášikovo	1–5	AC Nitra
FK Bestrent Horná Krupá	0–0 (3–4 p)	TJ Slavoj Boleráz
OŠK Svätý Peter	1–0	ŠK Kmeťovo
Športový klub Svodín	3–1	FK Slovan Šahy
MFK Vrbové	2–4	OFK Trebatice
ŠK Cífer	0–3	ŠK Blava 1928
ŠK Báb	1–1 (4–5 p)	ŠKF Sereď
ŠK Nitra-Dolné Krškany	2–1	ŠK Šoporňa
ŠK Šurany	3–1	ŠK Tvrdošovce
FC Jelka	0–0 (3–2 p)	TJ Kostolné Kračany
TJ Družstevník Topoľníky	2–3	FC Nádszeg
ŠK Bešeňov	0–5	AFC Nitra
OŠK Kľušov	2–9	FK Gerlachov
TJ Družstevník Odorín	1–4	FK Slovan Kendice
OFK Slovan Poproč	0–2	MFK Rožňava
Partizán Bardejov BŠK	2–2 (5–3 p)	TJ Busov Gaboltov
OŠK Zalužice	2–3	FK Sobrance-Sobranecko
TJ Tatran Huncovce	0–3	TJ Spišský Štiavnik
FK Geča 73	2–0	FK Kechnec
ŠK Harichovce	1–0	OŠK Rudňany
FK Nižný Hrušov	1–1 (3–5 p)	FK Čaňa
TJ Priehrada Nitrianske Rudno	2–4	TJ Družstevník Jacovce
TJ Jasenov	4–1	ŠK Nacina Ves
OTJ Jamník	1–0	ŠK v obci Chmeľov
TJ Slovan Dolné Kočkovce	1–3	FK Košeca
TJ Družstevník Hlboké	7–0	TJ Slovan Šaštín - Stráže
TJ Veľké Lovce	4–2	ŠK Sokol Starý Tekov
FK Košická Nová Ves	4–3	OFK Perín
29 July 2025
FK Kolárovo	2–3	TJ Imeľ
30 July 2025
OŠK Spišský Štvrtok	1–6	FK Vysoké Tatry
2 August 2025
ŠK Čierne	2–0	OŠK Rosina
ŠK Gbeľany	1–4	TJ Sokol Zubrohlava
Športový klub Vinica	0–4	TJ Sokol Medzibrod
MFK Nová Baňa	7–1	TJ Partizán Osrblie
TJ Družstevník Belá - Dulice	0–0 (1–4 p)	OFK 1950 Priechod
TJD Príbelce	0–5	ŠK Prameň Kováčová
FK ATTACK Vrútky	3–2	ŠK Dynamo Diviaky
TJ Veľké Leváre	1–2	TJ Záhoran Jakubov
Oravan Oravská Jasenica	2–1	ŠK Tvrdošín
OFK Slovenská Ľupča	3–2	FK FILJO Ladomerská Vieska
3 August 2025
TJ Slovan Skalité	2–7	FK Čadca
TJ Kysučan Korňa	2–7	ŠK Javorník Makov
FK 1928 Jasenie	1–6	TJ Družstevník Látky
FK Iskra Hnúšťa	2–2 (4–5 p)	MFK Baník Veľký Krtiš
ŠK Tomášov	0–2	OFK Dunajská Lužná
MŠK Kráľova pri Senci	3–3 (4–5 p)	SFC Kalinkovo
TJ Jarovce Bratislava	1–2	MFK Rusovce
ŠK Nová Dedinka	1–1 (3–1 p)	NŠK 1922 Bratislava
5 August 2025
Trenčiansky FK Opatová	0–4	OŠK Trenčianske Stankovce
FC 34 Liptovský Mikuláš - Palúdzka	0–4	FK Spišská Nová Ves
FK Iskra Nováky	0–5	FC Baník Prievidza
6 August 2025
ŠK Svätý Jur	0–1	FK Rača
TJ Slovan Nitra-Chrenová	1–3	FK Slovan Duslo Šaľa
TJ Iskra Holíč	0–5	Spartak Myjava
FC Komoča	1–2	FKM Nové Zámky
OŠK Kolíňany	3–2	FK Beluša
TJ Nitrianske Hrnčiarovce	2–3	TJ Družstevník Veľké Ludince
ŠK Veľké Zálužie	0–2	OK Častkovce
TJ Slovan Dudince	1–10	FK Podkonice
FK 09 Bacúch	0–3	MŠK Rimavská Sobota
TJ Máj Ružomberok-Černová	0–4	MŠK Námestovo
TJ Višňové	2–2 (4–3 p)	MFK Dolný Kubín
TJ Lovča	1–2	FTC Fiľakovo
Športové centrum Chynorany	0–2	MŠK Fomat Martin
TJ Iskra - Horné Orešany	1–2	TJ Jednota Bánová
ŠK Sásová	1–6	MŠK NOVOHRAD Lučenec
TJ Horný Hríčov	1–2	TJ Tatran Oravské Veselé
MŠK Želiezovce	0–4	TJ Baník Kalinovo
TJ Pokrok Stará Bystrica	0–4	MFK Bytča
ZFC 1939 Trenčín	2–4	MŠK Kysucké Nové Mesto
MFK Gelnica	0–1	MFK Vranov nad Topľou
OFK Olováry	0–1	MŠK Tesla Stropkov
FK Šalková	0–4	FK Poprad
ŠK Slávia Lackovce	2–2 (6–7 p)	FC Lokomotíva Košice
OFK Vikartovce	0–0 (2–4 p)	MŠK Spišské Podhradie
OŠK RENOP Liptovská Teplá	2–4	1. MFK Kežmarok
TJ Slovan Bystrička	0–3	OŠK Bešeňová
TJ Spartak Vysoká nad Kysucou	3–2	TJ Spartak Radôstka
MFK Detva	1–5	ŠK Badín
TJ Vinohrad Čebovce	2–0	1. FK Buzitka
TJ Družstevník Bitarová	2–4	TJ Tatran Krásno nad Kysucou
FK Mesta Tornaľa	0–4	FK Brezno
FK Fatran Varín	0–1	OFK Teplička nad Váhom
ŠK Závod	3–1	Lokomotíva Devínska Nová Ves
OŠK Slovenský Grob	0–0 (5–4 p)	FK Karpaty Limbach
ŠK Igram	0–5	TJ Malinovo
Futbalový klub Senica	0–3	FC Slovan Galanta
13 August 2025
FC Nový Život	0–1	ŠK 1923 Gabčíkovo
ŠK Senkvice	2–6	MŠK Senec
FC Rohožník	0–4	FC - Žolík Malacky
FK Jesenské	0–2	FK Humenné

== Second round ==
Team 1	Score	Team 2
20 August 2025
FC Jelka (5)	0–4	FC DAC 1904 Dunajská Streda (1)
FK Vysoké Tatry (5)	0–4	MFK Tatran Liptovský Mikuláš (2)
TJ Družstevník Látky (5)	2–2 (4–3 p)	MŠK Novohrad Lučenec (3)
SK Javornik Makov (4)	0–6	MŠK Námestovo (3)
FC Nitra (4)	0–0 (3–2 p)	MFK Bytča (3)
26 August 2025
TJ Spišský Štiavnik (6)	0–9	Slávia TU Košice (2)
FK Dubnica nad Váhom (4)	3–2	FC Baník Prievidza (3)
OŠK Bešeňová (4)	0–1	1. MFK Kežmarok (3)
27 August 2025
AC Nitra (5)	1–4	FC Spartak Trnava (1)
Oravan Oravská Jasenica (5)	2–6	MFK Ružomberok (1)
TJ Vinohrad Čebovce (6)	0–9	FK Železiarne Podbrezová (1)
Športový klub Svodín (6)	1–4	KFC Komárno (1)
FK Slovan Kendice (4)	0–5	FC Košice (1)
FK Čaňa (4)	1–7	1. FC Tatran Prešov (1)
TJ Družstevník Hlboké (6)	0–7	MFK Skalica (1)
FK Junior Kanianka (5)	0–9	AS Trenčín (1)
TJ Spartak Vysoká nad Kysucou (6)	1–7	MŠK Žilina (1)
ŠK Prameň Kováčová (4)	0–2	MFK Dukla Banská Bystrica (2)
OŠK Svätý Peter (6)	0–6	FC ViOn Zlaté Moravce (2)
OFK Teplička nad Váhom (5)	0–5	MŠK Považská Bystrica (2)
ŠK LR CRYSTAL (4)	1–3	MŠK Púchov (2)
TJ Malinovo (5)	1–4	FC Petržalka (2)
ŠK Nitra-Dolné Krškany (6)	1–1 (2–3 p)	OFK Malženice (2)
ŠK Badín (4)	0–1	MFK Zvolen (2)
TJ Imeľ (4)	1–4	FC ŠTK 1914 Šamorín (2)
ŠK Harichovce (6)	0–4	Redfox FC Stará Ľubovňa (2)
OŠK Trenčianske Stankovce (4)	3–1	Baník Lehota pod Vtáčnikom (2)
SFC Kalinkovo (4)	0–7	FK Inter Bratislava (2)
FC Pata (4)	0–0 (1–3 p)	OK Častkovce (3)
PFK Piešťany (4)	2–1	TJ Družstevník Veľké Ludince (3)
OTJ Jamník (6)	1–2	TJ Družstevník Breznica (5)
FK Košeca (6)	1–5	MŠK Fomat Martin (3)
TJ Slovan Košecké Podhradie (6)	1–0	MŠK Kysucké Nové Mesto (3)
TJ Družstevník Jacovce (6)	1–8	FK Beluša (3)
TJ Slavoj Boleráz (4)	2–2 (5–6 p)	FKM Nové Zámky (3)
TJ Veľké Lovce (6)	0–4	TJ Baník Kalinovo (3)
OFK Trebatice (4)	0–4	FC Slovan Galanta (3)
ŠK Blava 1928 (4)	4–1	TJ Jednota Bánová (3)
ŠKF Sereď (4)	1–3	FK Slovan Duslo Šaľa (3)
ŠK Šurany (5)	2–4	ŠK 1923 Gabčíkovo (3)
FK Gerlachov (4)	2–2 (8–9 p)	MŠK Spišské Podhradie (3)
TJ Dvorníky - Včeláre (5)	2–1	MFK Rožňava (4)
Partizán Bardejov (4)	4–1	MFK Vranov nad Topľou (3)
FK Košická Nová Ves (6)	0–4	MFK Snina (3)
TJ Jasenov (5)	2–1	ŠK Odeva Lipany (3)
FK Brezno (5)	2–1	MFK Slovan Sabinov (3)
TJ Sokol Medzibrod (4)	0–2	FTC Fiľakovo (3)
MFK Nová Baňa (5)	2–2 (8–9 p)	MŠK Rimavská Sobota (3)
OFK 1950 Priechod (6)	0–1	FK Podkonice (3)
FK Attack Vrútky (6)	0–2	FK Poprad (3)
TJ Višnové (5)	1–1 (3–5 p)	TJ Sokol Zubrohlava (4)
OŠK Slovenský Grob (6)	2–2 (3–4 p)	ŠK Nová Dedinka (4)
OFK Dunajská Lužná (4)	0–3	FK Rača (3)
FK Čadca (4)	1–1 (2–4 p)	TJ Tatran Oravské Veselé (3)
TJ Tatran Krásno nad Kysucou (4)	1–1 (5–4 p)	FK Spišská Nová Ves (3)
ŠK Závod (5)	0–3	MŠK Senec (3)
3 September 2025
TJ Záhoran Jakubov (4)	0–3	FC - Žolík Malacky (3)
FK Geča 73 (4)	2–4	FC Lokomotíva Košice (3)
MFK Rusovce (4)	0–0 (6–7 p)	Spartak Myjava (3)
ŠK Čierne (5)	1–4	FK Pohronie (2)
10 September 2025
MFK Baník Veľký Krtiš (5)	0–6	FK Humenné (3)
OFK Slovenská Ľupča (5)	2–7	MŠK Tesla Stropkov (3)
FK Sobrance-Sobranecko (4)	0–10	MFK Zemplín Michalovce (1)
FC Nádszeg (5)	2–4	ŠK Slovan Bratislava (1)

== Third round ==
6. liga side TJ Slovan Košecké Podhradie were the lowest-ranked team at this stage.

Team 1	Score	Team 2
9 September 2025
FK Slovan Duslo Šaľa (3)	1–1 (3–5 p)	OFK Malženice (2)
TJ Baník Kalinovo (3)	0–7	FC ViOn Zlaté Moravce (2)
14 September 2025
MŠK Spišské Podhradie (3)	1–7	FC Košice (1)
23 September 2025
FK Humenné (3)	2–0	FK Pohronie (2)
FKM Nové Zámky (3)	1–3	FC ŠTK 1914 Šamorín (2)
24 September 2025
FC - Žolík Malacky (3)	1–3	FC Petržalka (2)
FC Lokomotíva Košice (3)	1–2	Redfox FC Stará Ľubovňa (2)
TJ Tatran Krásno nad Kysucou (4)	1–3	MFK Dukla Banská Bystrica (2)
1. MFK Kežmarok (3)	0–7	MFK Ružomberok (1)
ŠK Blava 1928 (4)	2–6	FC Slovan Galanta (3)
TJ Slovan Košecké Podhradie (6)	1–1 (2–4 p)	OŠK Trenčianske Stankovce (4)
FK Podkonice (3)	1–3	FK Železiarne Podbrezová (1)
TJ Jasenov (5)	2–2 (2–3 p)	Slávia TU Košice (2)
FK Beluša (3)	0–4	FC Spartak Trnava (1)
TJ Sokol Zubrohlava (4)	0–8	MŠK Žilina (1)
ŠK Nová Dedinka (4)	0–4	MŠK Senec (3)
MŠK Fomat Martin (3)	0–1	MŠK Púchov (2)
TJ Dvorníky - Včeláre (5)	0–1	Partizán Bardejov (4)
Spartak Dubnica nad Váhom (4)	1–2	AS Trenčín (1)
TJ Družstevník Látky (5)	0–1	FTC Fiľakovo (3)
ŠK 1923 Gabčíkovo (3)	0–1	FC DAC 1904 Dunajská Streda (1)
FK Brezno (5)	1–5	MFK Tatran Liptovský Mikuláš (2)
30 September 2025
FK Poprad (3)	2–4	MŠK Tesla Stropkov (3)
MŠK Námestovo (3)	2–1	MŠK Považská Bystrica (2)
FC Nitra (4)	4–0	TJ Tatran Oravské Veselé (3)
1 October 2025
FK Rača (3)	1–2	FK Inter Bratislava (2)
MŠK Rimavská Sobota (3)	1–6	MFK Zvolen (2)
5 October 2025
PFK Piešťany (4)	0–5	ŠK Slovan Bratislava (1)
8 October 2025
MFK Snina (3)	0–3	MFK Zemplín Michalovce (1)
TJ Družstevník Breznica (5)	0–7	1. FC Tatran Prešov (1)
OK Častkovce (3)	0–4	KFC Komárno (1)
Spartak Myjava (3)	1–2	MFK Skalica (1)

== Fourth round ==
4. liga sides FC Nitra, OŠK Trenčianske Stankovce and Partizán Bardejov were the lowest-ranked teams at this stage.

Team 1	Score	Team 2
15 October 2025
FTC Fiľakovo (3)	5–2	Slávia TU Košice (2)
FC Nitra (4)	2–1	MŠK Námestovo (3)
21 October 2025
FK Humenné (3)	1–2	FK Železiarne Podbrezová (1)
MŠK Tesla Stropkov (3)	2–2 (9–10 p)	MFK Tatran Liptovský Mikuláš (2)
Redfox FC Stará Ľubovňa (2)	0–3	1. FC Tatran Prešov (1)
MFK Dukla Banská Bystrica (2)	2–2 (4–5 p)	MŠK Púchov (2)
22 October 2025
FC Slovan Galanta (3)	2–3	Komárno (1)
OFK Dynamo Malženice (2)	1–3	AS Trenčín (1)
MFK Zvolen (2)	0–1	MFK Ružomberok (1)
FC ŠTK 1914 Šamorín (2)	1–1 (4–5 p)	FC Spartak Trnava (1)
FC ViOn Zlaté Moravce (2)	2–4	FC Košice (1)
29 October 2025
Partizán Bardejov (4)	1–3	MFK Zemplín Michalovce (1)
MŠK Senec (3)	0–1	MŠK Žilina (1)
5 November 2025
FC Petržalka (2)	0–2	FC DAC 1904 Dunajská Streda (1)
11 November 2025
FK Inter Bratislava (2)	0–2	MFK Skalica (1)
15 November 2025
OŠK Trenčianske Stankovce (4)	1–6	ŠK Slovan Bratislava (1)

== Round of 16 ==
Team 1	Score	Team 2
15 November 2025
FC Nitra (4)	2–3	FK Železiarne Podbrezová (1)
18 November 2025
MŠK Púchov (2)	1–2	1. FC Tatran Prešov (1)
19 November 2025
FTC Fiľakovo (3)	0–5	AS Trenčín (1)
25 November 2025
MŠK Žilina (1)	3–1	MFK Skalica (1)
3 December 2025
FC DAC 1904 Dunajská Streda (1)	3–0	MFK Zemplín Michalovce (1)
10 December 2025
MFK Ružomberok (1)	2–4	FC Košice (1)
18 February 2026
FC Spartak Trnava (1)	1–1 (5–3 p)	ŠK Slovan Bratislava (1)
MFK Tatran Liptovský Mikuláš (2)	1–0	Komárno (1)

== Quarter-finals ==
Team 1	Score	Team 2
3 March 2026
FK Železiarne Podbrezová (1)	4–1	FC Spartak Trnava (1)
4 March 2026
FC Košice (1)	4–0	FC DAC 1904 Dunajská Streda (1)
10 March 2026
MŠK Žilina (1)	3–0	AS Trenčín (1)
11 March 2026
1. FC Tatran Prešov (1)	2–1	MFK Tatran Liptovský Mikuláš (2)

== Semi-finals ==
=== Summary ===
Team 1	Agg.	Team 2	1st leg	2nd leg
1. FC Tatran Prešov (1)	3–4	FC Košice (1)	2–2	1–2 (a.e.t.)
MŠK Žilina (1)	3–1	FK Železiarne Podbrezová (1)	2–0	1–1

=== Matches ===
17 March 2026
18:00 CET (UTC+1)

Tatran Prešov	2–2	Košice
Barbosa 12' (pen.); Masaryk 50'	Report	Čerepkai 72'; Kružliak 90'

Štadión Tatranu, Prešov
Attendance: 4,884
Referee: Peter Kráľovič
15 April 2026
18:00 CEST (UTC+2)

Košice	2–1 (a.e.t.)	Tatran Prešov
Čerepkai 34'; Dimun 99'	Report	Barbosa 19'

KFA, Košice
Attendance: 9,662
Referee: Erik Gemzický

Košice won 4–3 on aggregate.

18 March 2026
19:30 CET (UTC+1)

Žilina	2–0	Železiarne Podbrezová
Roginić 18'; Minárik 41'	Report

Štadión pod Dubňom, Žilina
Attendance: 1,739
Referee: Marián Ruc
14 April 2026
18:00 CEST (UTC+2)

Železiarne Podbrezová	1–1	Žilina
Šiler 21'	Report	Roginić 17'

ZELPO Aréna, Podbrezová
Attendance: 2,476
Referee: Michal Smolák

Žilina won 3–1 on aggregate.

== Final ==
1 May 2026
16:00 CEST (UTC+2)

Žilina	3–1	Košice
Faško 16'; Kaša 40'; Roginić 50'	Report	Miljanić 90'

Štadión pod Dubňom, Žilina
Attendance: 9,723
Referee: Peter Kráľovič
