= 2024–25 Slovak Cup =

Slovnaft Cup

Tournament details
- Country: Slovakia
- Dates: 21 July 2024 – 1 May 2025
- Teams: 260

Final positions
- Champions: Spartak Trnava (9th title)
- Runners-up: Ružomberok

Tournament statistics
- Top goal scorer: Marek Jastráb (5)

The 2024–25 Slovak Cup was the 56th season of the annual Slovak football cup competition. It was sponsored by Slovnaft and known as the Slovnaft Cup for sponsorship purposes.

Slovak First Football League team MFK Ružomberok were the defending champions, having defeated Spartak Trnava in the previous season's final to claim their second overall title.

However, in the 2024–25 season, the roles were reversed, as Spartak Trnava defeated Ružomberok in the final to win the cup – their ninth overall title and fourth in the last seven seasons.

As winners of the cup, Spartak Trnava qualified for the 2025–26 UEFA Europa League first qualifying round.

== Format ==
The Slovak Cup was played as a knockout tournament. All matches that ended in a draw after 90 minutes were decided by penalty shoot-outs. All rounds were played as one-off matches except the semi-finals, which were played over two legs.

== Teams ==
Round	Main date	New entries this round	Previous round winners	Number of fixtures	Clubs remaining
Preliminary round	27/28 July 2024	56	0	28	260
First round	7 August 2024	180	28	104	232
Second round	28 August 2024	24	104	64	128
Third round	25 September 2024	0	64	32	64
Fourth round	16 October 2024	0	32	16	32
Round of 16	6 November 2024	0	16	8	16
Quarter-finals	12 March 2025	0	8	4	8
Semi-finals	2 and 16 April 2025	0	4	4	4
Final	1 May 2025	0	2	1	2

== Preliminary round ==
Team 1	Score	Team 2
21 July 2024
OŠK Svätý Peter	1–4	ŠK Bešeňov
FK Horná Súča	1–3	TFK Opatová
OŠK Šúrovce	0–4	FC Slovan Hlohovec
TJ Družstevník Rišňovce	1–2	ŠK Veľké Zálužie
AC Nitra - futbal	2–1	OŠK Kolíňany
FK Slovan Nemšová	5–0	Sokol FC Chocholná - Velčice
ŠK Cífer 1929	2–0	TJ Tatran Jablonica
ŠFK Štefanov	0–0 (4–3 p)	TJ Iskra Holíč
27 July 2024
ŠK Bernolákovo	0–2	ŠK Nová Dedinka
TJ Družstevník Čečejovce	2–3	OFK Perín
TJ Partizán Ľubeľa	2–0	Liptovský Mikuláš - Palúdzka
ŠK Sedem Námestovo	1–1 (4–5 p)	ŠK Olympia Bobrov
TJ Kysučan Korňa	1–3	ŠK Čierne
OŠK Kamenná Poruba	1–5	OŠK Rosina
TJ Vinohrad Čebovce	3–1	MFK Strojár Krupina
FK Strečno	2–2 (4–2 p)	FK ATTACK Vrútky
TJ Družstevník Bitarová	0–0 (2–4 p)	OFK Teplička nad Váhom
ŠK Šenkvice	1–1 (4–5 p)	PŠC Pezinok
ŠK Kaplna	0–1	MŠK Kráľová pri Senci
28 July 2024
FK Prakovce	1–1 (3–5 p)	OTJ Jamník
TJ Mokrance	1–3	OFK Slovan Poproč
OŠK Kľušov	2–2 (3–2 p)	TJ Busov Gaboltov
OŠK Fintice	2–3	Sokol Chminianska Nová Ves
TJ Tatran Huncovce	2–1	OFK Vikartovce
FK 1928 Jasenie	3–2	FK Brezno
ŠK Báhoň	3–0	ŠK Svätý Jur
MFK Záhorská Bystrica	0–3	OŠK Láb
30 July 2024
ŠK Igram	2–2 (5–3 p)	Slovan Most pri Bratislave

== First round ==
Team 1	Score	Team 2
26 July 2024
NŠK 1922 Bratislava	1–1 (5–3 p)	OFK Dunajská Lužná
ŠK Cífer 1929	0–0 (9–8 p)	FC Slovan Hlohovec
27 July 2024
AFC Nové Mesto nad Váhom	2–2 (9–8 p)	TJ Tatran Krásno nad Kysucou
ŠK Nitra-Dolné Krškany	0–0 (5–4 p)	FC Nitra
TJ Lokomotíva Bánov	1–0	ŠK Tvrdošovce
TJ Spartak Radôstka	2–5	MŠK Kysucké Nové Mesto
OFK Trebatice	2–3	OK Častkovce
TJ Kostolné Kračany	2–1	FC Slovan Galanta
ŠK Šoporňa	2–3	FK Slovan Duslo Šaľa
FK Karpaty Limbach	1–5	SDM Domino
ŠK Vrakuňa Bratislava	0–4	ŠK Tomášov
TJ Jarovce Bratislava	1–5	MFK Rusovce
FC Topoľčany	0–0 (5–3 p)	OFK Tovarníky
OFK 1950 Priechod	0–3	ŠK Badín
OFK Slovenská Ľupča	0–5	RSC Hamsik Academy
28 July 2024
TJ Spartak Vysoká nad Kysucou	3–5	MFK Bytča
MFK Vrbové	0–2	ŠK Blava 1928
TJ Kopčany	3–2	TJ Sokol Borský Mikuláš
TJ Družstevník Rybky	2–2 (2–4 p)	TJ Slovan Dubovce
TJ Považan Pruské	2–3	TJ Spartak Kvašov
TJ Spartak Lysá pod Makytou	0–1	ŠK LR CRYSTAL
TJ Slovan Šaštín-Stráže	0–6	TJ Nafta Gbely
Futbal - FK Melčice - Lieskové	0–7	OŠK Trenčianske Stankovce
FK Košeca	0–0 (5–4 p)	FK Spartak Dubnica nad Váhom
TJ Tatran Uhrovec	0–2	FC Baník Prievidza
FC Nový Život	1–1 (2–1 p)	TJ Čierny Brod
TJ Družstevník Topoľníky	1–2	ŠK 1923 Gabčíkovo
TJ Horné Saliby	2–1	FC Nádszeg
FK Bestrent Horná Krupá	0–5	TJ Slavoj Boleráz
FC Komjatice	1–5	OFK Branč
ŠK Kmeťovo	0–3	ŠK Šurany
ŠK Sokol Starý Tekov	2–2 (2–4 p)	MŠK Želiezovce
TJ Salka	0–0 (4–3 p)	MŠO Štúrovo
ŠK Nevidzany	2–2 (4–3 p)	FK Slovan Levice
FK Veľká Lomnica	2–4	ŠK Harichovce
TJ Pokrok Stará Bystrica	1–1 (4–3 p)	TJ Slovan Magura Vavrečka
TJ Višňové	0–2	FK Čadca
ŠK Bešeňov	0–4	FKM Nové Zámky
TJ Veľké Lovce	0–6	ŠKF Sereď
ŠK Báb	0–3	FK Beluša
FK Junior Kanianka	2–4	Baník Lehota pod Vtáčnikom
AC Nitra - futbal	6–0	ŠK Veľké Zálužie
ŠK Lozorno	2–0	Lokomotíva Devínska Nová Ves
6 August 2024
OŠK Pribiš	0–0 (4–5 p)	MFK Dolný Kubín
7 August 2024
FC Rohožník	0–1	FC Žolík Malacky
ŠK Igram	1–5	FK Rača Bratislava
OŠK Láb	1–6	FK Inter Bratislava
TJ Družstevník Odorín	0–2	FK Kamenica
FK Vysoké Tatry	3–0	MŠK Slavoj Spišská Belá
TJ Dunajec Spišská Stará Ves	0–3	1. MFK Kežmarok
FK Vechec	2–1	OFK Tatran Bystré
TJ Jasenov	4–2	MŠK Spartak Medzilaborce
TJ Družstevník Čirč	2–5	FK Gerlachov
TJ Sokol Brezovička	1–1 (3–5 p)	MFK Gelnica
FK Široké	0–5	FK TJ Sokol Brezovica
MFK Ťahanovce	0–9	MFK Spartak Medzev
TJ Družstevník Malá Ida	5–1	FK Kechnec
FK Slovan Kendice	3–0	TJ Dvorníky - Včeláre
FK II.Rákóczi Ferenc Borša	1–4	FK Sobrance-Sobranecko
OŠK Zalužice	0–2	ŠK Nacina Ves
TJ Maratón Seňa	1–3	FC Lokomotíva Košice
FK Šalková	4–3	TJ Družstevník Látky
ŠK Dynamo Diviaky	2–0	TJ Sokol Medzibrod
FK Slovan Žabokreky	0–2	OŠK Bešeňová
ŠK Sásová	2–2 (4–3 p)	MFK Detva
FK 09 Bacúch	1–1 (9–8 p)	MFK Revúca
ŠK Vinica	0–3	OFK Hliník nad Hronom
MFK Jelšava	1–4	TJ Partizán Osrblie
OFK Olováry	1–2	TJD Príbelce
FK FILJO Ladomerská Vieska	2–1	ŠK Prameň Kováčová
1. FK Buzitka	1–4	MFK Baník Veľký Krtíš
Oravan Oravská Jasenica	1–2	TJ Sokol Zubrohlava
TJ Tatran Chlebnice	1–1 (4–3 p)	ŠK Tvrdošín
ŠKM Liptovský Hrádok	2–6	Družstevník Liptovská Štiavnica
TJ Sokol Liesek	0–6	TJ Tatran Oravské Veselé
TJ Slovan Bystrička	4–1	OŠK Nededza
TJ Horný Hričov	3–2	ŠK Javorník Makov
OFK Perín	0–10	Slávia TU Košice
OFK Slovan Poproč	0–1	MFK Snina
Sokol Chminianska Nová Ves	2–4	MŠK Tesla Stropkov
OŠK Kľušov	1–4	Partizán Bardejov
TJ Tatran Huncovce	0–7	ŠK Odeva Lipany
OTJ Jamník	2–2 (2–3 p)	MFK Vranov nad Topľou
ŠFK Štefanov	1–5	Spartak Myjava
TJ Tatran Cementáreň Ladce	0–3	TJ Jednota Bánová
FK Iskra Nováky	0–3	MŠK Fomat Martin
ŠK Podlužany	0–7	TJ Družstevník Veľké Ludince
FK 1928 Jasenie	1–3	FK Podkonice
FK Iskra Hnúšťa	0–2	MŠK Novohrad Lučenec
TJ Sklotatran Poltár	w/o	FTC Fiľakovo
FK Jesenské	3–3 (3–5 p)	MŠK Rimavská Sobota
TJ Vinohrad Čebovce	0–3	TJ Baník Kalinovo
ŠK Olympia Bobrov	2–2 (4–1 p)	MŠK Spišské Podhradie
OŠK Rosina	1–2	FK Spišská Nová Ves
ŠK Čierne	3–3 (2–4 p)	FK Poprad
OFK Teplička nad Váhom	1–1 (2–3 p)	MŠK Námestovo
FK Slovan Nemšová	0–2	TFK Opatová
TJ Fatran Varín	1–4	ŠK Belá
ŠK Báhoň	1–3	PŠC Pezinok
FK Strečno	2–3	TJ Partizán Ľubeľa
8 August 2024
TJ Lovča	6–2	FK Sitno Banská Štiavnica
14 August 2024
FK Krásnohorské Podhradie	0–4	MFK Rožňava
MŠK Kráľová pri Senci	1–2	ŠK Nová Dedinka
15 August 2024
FK Bidovce	0–3	FK Geča 73

== Second round ==
Team 1	Score	Team 2
7 August 2024
ŠK Cífer 1929 (6)	0–4	OK Častkovce (3)
21 August 2024
FC Nový Život (6)	0–2	TJ Kostolné Kračany (5)
TJ Horné Saliby (6)	0–7	FC ŠTK 1914 Šamorín (2)
MFK Baník Veľký Krtíš (5)	0–6	FK Pohronie (2)
27 August 2024
ŠK LR CRYSTAL (4)	1–4	MŠK Púchov (2)
OŠK Bešeňová (4)	0–2	RSC Hamsik Academy (3)
ŠK Badín (4)	1–0	MŠK Novohrad Lučenec (3)
28 August 2024
MŠK Kysucké Nové Mesto (4)	0–2	MŠK Považská Bystrica (2)
NŠK 1922 Bratislava (4)	4–1	SDM Domino (4)
MFK Rusovce (4)	2–4	FC Petržalka (2)
TJ Slovan Dubovce (6)	1–3	OFK Malženice (2)
TJ Nafta Gbely (4)	0–5	FC ViOn Zlaté Moravce (2)
OŠK Trenčianske Stankovce (4)	2–2 (3–4 p)	AFC Nové Mesto nad Váhom (4)
ŠK Nitra-Dolné Krškany (6)	0–2	FK Beluša (3)
FC Baník Prievidza (4)	1–4	Baník Lehota pod Vtáčnikom (3)
ŠK Nevidzany (6)	1–4	ŠK 1923 Gabčíkovo (4)
TJ Slavoj Boleráz (4)	1–2	FK Slovan Duslo Šaľa (3)
TJ Salka (6)	0–9	FC DAC 1904 Dunajská Streda (1)
FK Košeca (6)	0–9	AS Trenčín (1)
TJ Lokomotíva Bánov (6)	0–6	FKM Nové Zámky (3)
FK Čadca (4)	0–2	MFK Dolný Kubín (3)
FC Topoľčany (6)	0–3	MŠK Fomat Martin (3)
MŠK Želiezovce (6)	0–2	TJ Družstevník Veľké Ludince (3)
OFK Hliník nad Hronom (5)	0–5	KFC Komárno (1)
FK Vysoké Tatry (6)	0–4	Stará Ľubovňa Redfox FC (2)
1. MFK Kežmarok (4)	1–3	MFK Zemplín Michalovce (1)
TJ Partizán Osrblie (4)	4–2	MŠK Rimavská Sobota (3)
TJ Tatran Chlebnice (6)	0–8	FK Železiarne Podbrezová (1)
TJ Horný Hričov (6)	0–7	MŠK Žilina (1)
FK Šalková (6)	0–7	FK Podkonice (3)
PŠC Pezinok (4)	0–4	FC Žolík Malacky (3)
ŠK Olympia Bobrov (5)	1–1 (5–3 p)	TJ Sokol Zubrohlava (4)
MFK Bytča (4)	1–0	FK Poprad (3)
TJ Partizán Ľubeľa (6)	1–0	MFK Zvolen (2)
Družstevník Liptovská Štiavnica (5)	0–3	FK Spišská Nová Ves (3)
FK 09 Bacúch (6)	2–7	FTC Fiľakovo (3)
TJ Slovan Bystrička (6)	0–3	MŠK Námestovo (3)
MFK Spartak Medzev (4)	0–2	MFK Snina (3)
ŠK Belá (5)	2–3	MFK Tatran Liptovský Mikuláš (2)
TJ Jasenov (5)	3–1	FK Gerlachov (4)
TFK Opatová (6)	0–2	ŠKF Sereď (3)
FK TJ Sokol Brezovica (5)	0–4	FC Košice (1)
ŠK Sásová (6)	0–7	MFK Dukla Banská Bystrica (1)
TJ Spartak Kvašov (5)	3–3 (5–3 p)	TJ Jednota Bánová (3)
ŠK Harichovce (6)	0–2	ŠK Odeva Lipany (3)
FK Vechec (6)	0–4	Partizán Bardejov (3)
ŠK Tomášov (4)	0–0 (4–3 p)	FK Inter Bratislava (3)
MFK Rožňava (4)	0–2	FC Lokomotíva Košice (3)
ŠK Nová Dedinka (4)	1–6	MFK Skalica (1)
Geča 73 (5)	1–6	Slávia TU Košice (3)
3 September 2024
FK Slovan Kendice (5)	1–2	FC Tatran Prešov (2)
ŠK Nacina Ves (5)	3–1	FK Sobrance-Sobranecko (4)
MFK Gelnica (5)	2–4	MŠK Tesla Stropkov (3)
4 September 2024
ŠK Šurany (5)	6–0	OFK Branč (5)
FK Kamenica (6)	0–8	MFK Vranov nad Topľou (3)
FK FILJO Ladomerská Vieska (5)	1–6	TJ Baník Kalinovo (3)
TJ Lovča (6)	1–4	TJD Príbelce (4)
TJ Kopčany (6)	0–9	Spartak Myjava (3)
5 September 2024
TJ Družstevník Malá Ida (5)	0–7	FK Humenné (2)
10 September 2024
AC Nitra - futbal (6)	0–5	ŠK Slovan Bratislava (1)
TJ Pokrok Stará Bystrica (6)	2–5	TJ Tatran Oravské Veselé (4)
11 September 2024
ŠK Blava 1928 (4)	0–2	FC Spartak Trnava (1)
ŠK Lozorno (5)	1–3	FK Rača Bratislava (3)
18 September 2024
ŠK Dynamo Diviaky (5)	0–9	MFK Ružomberok (1)

== Third round ==
Team 1	Score	Team 2
10 September 2024
ŠK Olympia Bobrov (5)	0–9	FK Železiarne Podbrezová (1)
24 September 2024
MŠK Námestovo (3)	0–5	MŠK Žilina (1)
Slávia TU Košice (3)	0–3	FC Tatran Prešov (2)
FK Beluša (3)	1–6	ŠK Slovan Bratislava (1)
TJ Tatran Oravské Veselé (4)	0–1	FK Spišská Nová Ves (3)
25 September 2024
TJ Kostolné Kračany (5)	1–0	ŠK 1923 Gabčíkovo (4)
ŠK Badín (4)	1–3	MFK Dukla Banská Bystrica (1)
TJ Spartak Kvašov (5)	0–3	MŠK Púchov (2)
TJ Partizán Ľubeľa (6)	0–5	RSC Hamsik Academy (3)
FC Žolík Malacky (3)	2–2 (1–3 p)	MFK Skalica (1)
NŠK 1922 Bratislava (4)	2–5	FK Rača Bratislava (3)
ŠK Tomášov (4)	0–6	FC Petržalka (2)
Spartak Myjava (3)	5–3	OFK Malženice (2)
AFC Nové Mesto nad Váhom (4)	0–2	AS Trenčín (1)
Baník Lehota pod Vtáčnikom (3)	6–0	MŠK Fomat Martin (3)
ŠK Šurany (5)	0–1	FK Slovan Duslo Šaľa (3)
TJ Družstevník Veľké Ludince (3)	0–3	FC DAC 1904 Dunajská Streda (1)
TJ Jasenov (5)	1–1 (3–4 p)	Partizán Bardejov (3)
TJ Partizán Osrblie (4)	5–3	TJD Príbelce (4)
MFK Dolný Kubín (3)	1–1 (5–4 p)	MŠK Považská Bystrica (2)
MFK Bytča (4)	2–1	MFK Tatran Liptovský Mikuláš (2)
MŠK Tesla Stropkov (3)	1–4	FC Košice (1)
MFK Snina (3)	1–1 (3–2 p)	FK Humenné (2)
ŠK Nacina Ves (5)	1–5	FC Lokomotíva Košice (3)
MFK Vranov nad Topľou (3)	1–4	Stará Ľubovňa Redfox FC (2)
2 October 2024
FKM Nové Zámky (3)	1–1 (2–3 p)	FC ŠTK 1914 Šamorín (2)
OK Častkovce (3)	1–7	FC Spartak Trnava (1)
8 October 2024
TJ Baník Kalinovo (3)	2–0	FK Pohronie (2)
9 October 2024
ŠKF Sereď (3)	0–3	FC ViOn Zlaté Moravce (2)
FK Podkonice (3)	2–3	MFK Ružomberok (1)
FTC Fiľakovo (3)	1–3	KFC Komárno (1)
ŠK Odeva Lipany (3)	0–2	MFK Zemplín Michalovce (1)

== Fourth round ==
Team 1	Score	Team 2
8 October 2024
FK Rača Bratislava (3)	4–0	Partizán Bardejov (3)
16 October 2024
FC ŠTK 1914 Šamorín (2)	1–2	MFK Zemplín Michalovce (1)
MFK Bytča (4)	1–4	FC Spartak Trnava (1)
RSC Hamsik Academy (3)	0–4	KFC Komárno (1)
Spartak Myjava (3)	3–1	FC Lokomotíva Košice (3)
MFK Snina (3)	1–1 (2–4 p)	MFK Dolný Kubín (3)
MŠK Púchov (2)	0–2	FK Železiarne Podbrezová (1)
FC Petržalka (2)	0–3	FC Košice (1)
TJ Partizán Osrblie (4)	0–8	MŠK Žilina (1)
Baník Lehota pod Vtáčnikom (3)	1–2	AS Trenčín (1)
TJ Baník Kalinovo (3)	1–2	MFK Dukla Banská Bystrica (1)
22 October 2024
FC Tatran Prešov (2)	3–2	MFK Skalica (1)
FC ViOn Zlaté Moravce (2)	0–0 (4–2 p)	Stará Ľubovňa Redfox FC (2)
23 October 2024
TJ Kostolné Kračany (5)	0–3	MFK Ružomberok (1)
FK Slovan Duslo Šaľa (3)	1–2	FC DAC 1904 Dunajská Streda (1)
26 October 2024
FK Spišská Nová Ves (3)	0–2	ŠK Slovan Bratislava (1)

== Round of 16 ==
Team 1	Score	Team 2
5 November 2024
FC ViOn Zlaté Moravce (2)	6–1	MFK Dolný Kubín (3)
6 November 2024
MFK Zemplín Michalovce (1)	1–1 (3–4 p)	MŠK Žilina (1)
FC DAC 1904 Dunajská Streda (1)	0–2	MFK Dukla Banská Bystrica (1)
1. FC Tatran Prešov (2)	2–1	FK Rača Bratislava (3)
Spartak Myjava (3)	1–3	FC Košice (1)
13 November 2024
MFK Ružomberok (1)	2–0	KFC Komárno (1)
14 November 2024
FC Spartak Trnava (1)	1–1 (3–2 p)	FK Železiarne Podbrezová (1)
4 February 2025
ŠK Slovan Bratislava (1)	3–1	AS Trenčín (1)

== Quarter-finals ==
Team 1	Score	Team 2
11 March 2025
MŠK Žilina (1)	0–2	FC Spartak Trnava (1)
FC ViOn Zlaté Moravce (2)	1–2	MFK Ružomberok (1)
12 March 2025
MFK Dukla Banská Bystrica (1)	1–0	1. FC Tatran Prešov (2)
FC Košice (1)	0–1	ŠK Slovan Bratislava (1)

== Semi-finals ==
=== Summary ===
Team 1	Agg.	Team 2	1st leg	2nd leg
MFK Ružomberok (1)	4–1	MFK Dukla Banská Bystrica (1)	2–1	2–0
ŠK Slovan Bratislava (1)	3–3 (2–4 p)	FC Spartak Trnava (1)	2–1	1–2

=== Matches ===
1 April 2025
18:00 CEST (UTC+2)

Ružomberok	2–1	Banská Bystrica
Madleňák 44'; Gerec 54'	Report	Migaľa 68'

Štadión pod Čebraťom, Ružomberok
Attendance: 1,345
Referee: Martin Dohál
16 April 2025
18:00 CEST (UTC+2)

Banská Bystrica	0–2	Ružomberok
	Report	Chobot 3'; Madleňák 84'

Národný Atletický Štadión, Banská Bystrica
Attendance: 1,472
Referee: Filip Glova

Ružomberok won 4–1 on aggregate.

2 April 2025
18:00 CEST (UTC+2)

Slovan Bratislava	2–1	Spartak Trnava
Mak 31'; Vojtko 41'	Report	Ofori 12'

Tehelné pole, Bratislava
Attendance: 7,816
Referee: Michal Očenáš
15 April 2025
18:00 CEST (UTC+2)

Spartak Trnava	2–1 (a.e.t.)	Slovan Bratislava
Mikovič 35'; Ďuriš 90'	Report	Kashia 39'
Penalties
Jureškin (penalty scored); Procházka (penalty scored); Zeljković (penalty scored); Badolo (penalty missed); Sabo (penalty scored)	4–2	(penalty scored) Tolić; (penalty missed) Barseghyan; (penalty scored) Ihnatenko; (penalty missed) Mak

Anton Malatinský Stadium, Trnava
Attendance: 10,132
Referee: Boris Marhefka

3–3 on aggregate; Spartak Trnava won 4–2 on penalties.

== Final ==
1 May 2025
15:00 (UTC+2)

Ružomberok	0–1	Spartak Trnava
	Report	Daniel 31'

DAC Aréna, Dunajská Streda
Attendance: 9,437
Referee: Michal Smolák

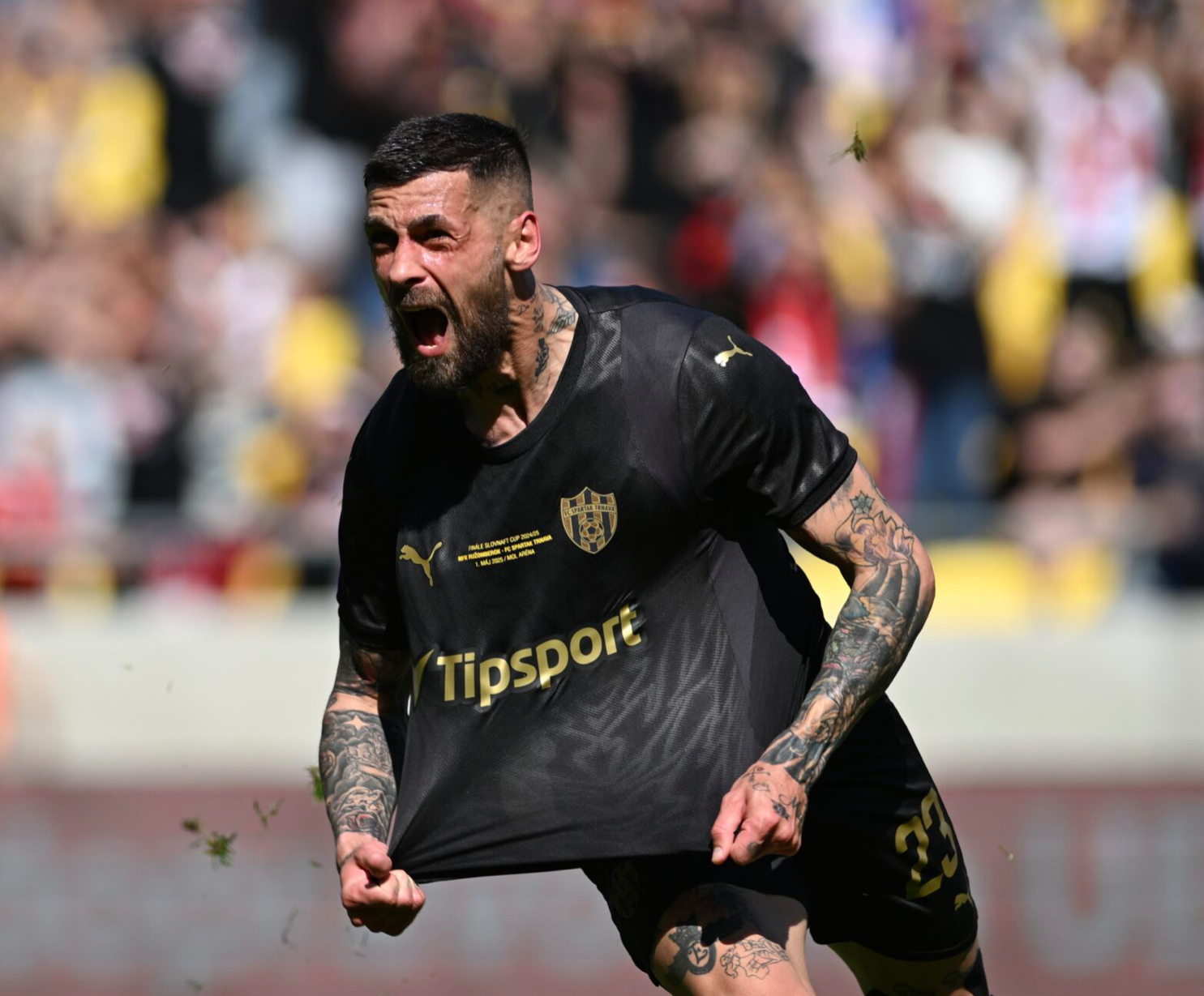
Erik Daniel after scoring the winning goal.

== See also ==
- 2024–25 Slovak First Football League
- 2025–26 UEFA Europa League
