= 2025–26 4. Liga (Slovakia) =

4. Liga
- Season: 2025–26
- Champions: OFK Dunajská Lužná (Bratislava); FC Nitra (West); FK Čadca (Middle); Partizán Bardejov (East)
- Promoted: OFK Dunajská Lužná (Bratislava); FC Nitra (West); FK Čadca (Middle); Partizán Bardejov (East)
- Relegated: FC Slovan Modra; MŠK Kráľová pri Senci (Bratislava); ŠKF Sereď; ŠK LR CRYSTAL (West); TJ Spartak Radôstka; TJ Sokol Zubrohlava; FK FILJO Ladomerská Vieska (Middle); MFK Veľký Šariš; OŠK Pavlovce nad Uhom (East)

The 2025–26 season of 4. Liga was the 33rd season of the 4. Liga in Slovakia, since its establishment in 1993. Teams are geographically divided into four groups: Bratislava, West (Západ), Middle (Stred) and East (Východ). Teams are playing against teams in their own division only. The league was contested by 60 teams divided into four groups.

== Bratislava Group ==
This year's edition of the competition in the Bratislava group was won by the club OFK Dunajská Lužná, which will play in the 3rd league next season. FC Slovan Modra and MŠK Kráľová pri Senci were relegated from the 4. Liga to the 5. Liga following the 2025–26 season.

=== League table ===
Pos	Team	Pld	W	D	L	GF	GA	GD	Pts	Promotion or relegation
1	OFK Dunajská Lužná (C, P)	30	22	6	2	76	18	+58	72	Promotion to 3. Liga
2	ŠK Bernolákovo	30	20	5	5	62	25	+37	65	
3	MFK Rusovce	30	17	7	6	65	38	+27	58	
4	TJ Rovinka	30	18	4	8	61	41	+20	58	
5	Nová Dedinka	30	15	8	7	50	33	+17	53	
6	FK Slovan Ivanka pri Dunaji	30	15	4	11	61	40	+21	49	
7	ŠK Tomášov	30	12	9	9	48	31	+17	45	
8	SFC Kalinkovo	30	10	7	13	40	54	−14	37	
9	Karlova Ves	30	10	6	14	46	55	−9	36	
10	PŠC Pezinok	30	9	8	13	40	44	−4	35	
11	FC Rohožník	30	10	4	16	52	65	−13	34	
12	NŠK 1922 Bratislava	30	9	7	14	40	40	0	34	
13	TJ Záhoran Jakubov	30	8	7	15	34	56	−22	31	
14	Lokomotíva Devínska Nová Ves	30	7	6	17	30	58	−28	27	
15	FC Slovan Modra (R)	30	7	5	18	32	65	−33	26	Relegation to 5. Liga
16	MŠK Kráľová pri Senci (R)	30	3	3	24	20	94	−74	12	Relegation to 5. Liga

Source: Sportnet
Rules for classification: 1) Points; 2) Goal difference; 3) Goals scored.
(C) Champions; (P) Promoted; (R) Relegated

== Western Group ==
In the Western Group, the club FC Nitra won and will play in the 3rd league next season. Within the Western Group, the club ŠKF Sereď withdrew its A-team from all competitions after the season, meaning it will no longer continue in the league next season. The club FK Horná Krupá will continue under the brand OFK Dynamo Malženice "B" starting from next season.

=== League table ===
Pos	Team	Pld	W	D	L	GF	GA	GD	Pts	Promotion or relegation
1	FC Nitra (C, P)	30	25	4	1	82	15	+67	79	Promotion to 3. Liga
2	TJ Slavoj Boleráz	30	21	3	6	65	35	+30	66	
3	Spartak Dubnica	30	19	5	6	59	35	+24	62	
4	PFK Piešťany	30	16	5	9	48	30	+18	53	
5	FC Pata	30	15	6	9	51	36	+15	51	
6	OŠK Trenčianske Stankovce	30	13	7	10	60	52	+8	46	
7	ŠK Blava	30	12	4	14	45	51	−6	40	
8	TJ Imeľ	30	11	6	13	52	48	+4	39	
9	FK Slovan Levice	30	10	8	12	40	49	−9	38	
10	OFK Trebatice	30	8	10	12	40	53	−13	34	
11	AFC Nové Mesto	30	8	8	14	39	57	−18	32	
12	ŠKF Sereď (W)	30	9	4	17	32	50	−18	31	Withdrawal of the first team from all competitions
13	FK Horná Krupá	30	8	5	17	38	55	−17	29	
14	TJ Nafta Gbely	30	7	6	17	33	59	−26	27	
15	ŠK Šoporňa	30	7	6	17	39	60	−21	27	
16	ŠK LR CRYSTAL (R)	30	6	3	21	29	67	−38	21	Relegation to 5. Liga

Source: Sportnet
Rules for classification: 1) Points; 2) Goal difference; 3) Goals scored.
(C) Champions; (P) Promoted; (R) Relegated; (W) ?

== Middle Group ==
In the Central Group, the club FK Čadca won and will play in the 3rd league next season. TJ Sokol Medzibrod also earned promotion from the 4. Liga to the 3. Liga for the 2026–27 season. Following the end of the 2025–26 season, TJ Spartak Radôstka withdrew from the league.

=== League table ===
Pos	Team	Pld	W	D	L	GF	GA	GD	Pts	Promotion or relegation
1	FK Čadca (C, P)	26	19	3	4	85	29	+56	60	Promotion to 3. Liga
2	TJ Sokol Medzibrod (P)	26	15	6	5	58	42	+16	51	Promotion to 3. Liga
3	OŠK Bešeňová	26	15	5	6	53	28	+25	50	
4	TJ Tatran Krásno nad Kysucou	26	13	7	6	55	35	+20	46	
5	ŠK Badín	26	12	7	7	46	35	+11	43	
6	OŠK Rosina	26	11	5	10	40	31	+9	38	
7	TJ Partizán Osrblie	26	11	3	12	41	43	−2	36	
8	ŠK Javorník Makov	26	10	5	11	43	48	−5	35	
9	ŠK Prameň Kováčová	26	10	5	11	40	44	−4	35	
10	FK Slávia Staškov	26	10	4	12	49	40	+9	34	
11	TJ Spartak Radôstka (R)	26	9	3	14	55	72	−17	30	Relegation to 5. Liga
12	OŠK Baník Stráňavy	26	6	5	15	23	57	−34	23	
13	TJ Sokol Zubrohlava (R)	26	5	4	17	29	58	−29	19	Relegation to 5. Liga
14	FK FILJO Ladomerská Vieska (R)	26	4	2	20	16	71	−55	14	Relegation to 5. Liga

Source: Sportnet
Rules for classification: 1) Points; 2) Goal difference; 3) Goals scored.
(C) Champions; (P) Promoted; (R) Relegated

== Eastern Group ==
In the Eastern Group, the club Partizán Bardejov won and will play in the 3rd league next season.

=== League table ===
Pos	Team	Pld	W	D	L	GF	GA	GD	Pts	Promotion or relegation
1	Partizán Bardejov (C, P)	26	19	6	1	63	16	+47	63	Promotion to 3. Liga
2	FK Slovan Kendice	26	17	6	3	80	35	+45	57	
3	FK Čaňa	26	15	4	7	73	41	+32	49	
4	PWG Sokol Ľubotice	26	14	6	6	50	29	+21	48	
5	FK Gerlachov	26	14	3	9	60	31	+29	45	
6	OŠK Rudňany	26	9	12	5	36	27	+9	39	
7	ŠK Záhradné	26	10	9	7	46	37	+9	39	
8	FK Kechnec	26	8	11	7	40	39	+1	35	
9	FK Sobrance-Sobranecko	26	9	6	11	37	58	−21	33	
10	MŠK Spartak Medzilaborce	26	7	3	16	40	68	−28	24	
11	FK Geča 73	26	6	5	15	31	53	−22	23	
12	MFK Rožňava	26	5	5	16	25	59	−34	20	
13	MFK Veľký Šariš (R)	26	4	6	16	32	63	−31	18	Relegation to 5. Liga
14	OŠK Pavlovce nad Uhom (R)	26	1	6	19	18	75	−57	9	Relegation to 5. Liga

Source: Sportnet
Rules for classification: 1) Points; 2) Goal difference; 3) Goals scored.
(C) Champions; (P) Promoted; (R) Relegated
