= List of football clubs in Slovakia =

This is a list of association football clubs in Slovakia.

== Men's ==
=== Slovak First Football League ===
The Slovak First Football League, formerly Fortuna Liga and currently Niké liga for sponsorship reasons, is the top flight of Slovakia's football league system. Contested by 12 professional clubs, it operates on a system of promotion and relegation. Seasons typically run from August to May with each team playing 22 matches (playing all 11 other teams both home and away) in the round-robin format. After the finish, the league splits into top- (champions) and bottom- (relegation) 6 to play an extra home and away round. The teams keep all their points from the round-robin and play an extra 10 matches to finish at 32 matches altogether. Most games are played on Saturday and Sunday afternoons.

This is a list of participants in the 2025-26 season:

| Name | Stadium |
|---|---|
| ŠK Slovan Bratislava | Tehelné pole |
| FC Spartak Trnava | Anton Malatinský Stadium |
| MŠK Žilina | Štadión pod Dubňom |
| FC DAC 1904 Dunajská Streda | DAC Aréna |
| FK Železiarne Podbrezová | ZELPO Aréna |
| FC Košice | Košická futbalová aréna |
| MFK Zemplín Michalovce | Mestský futbalový štadión |
| KFC Komárno | ViOn Aréna (temporary) |
| MFK Ružomberok | Štadión pod Čebraťom |
| AS Trenčín | Štadión Sihoť |
| MFK Skalica | Mestský štadión Skalica |
| 1. FC Tatran Prešov | Futbal Tatran Arena |

=== Slovak Second football league ===
Slovak Second football league, the second league of Slovakia's football pyramid, also known as MONACObet LIGA for sponsorships reasons, is a national professional competition, which is contested by 16 clubs. At the end of the season, the top-finishing team is automatically promoted to the First Division, the second-placed team plays against the eleventh-placed team of the first league in two-legged play-offs (home and away).

In summer 2020, MFK Ružomberok reserves team vacated the competition and have not been replaced. In the 2020–21 season, the league comprises 16 football teams. Over the course of a season, which runs typically from August to the following May, each team plays twice against the others, once at 'home' and once 'away', resulting in each team competing in 32 games in total.

The list of participants in the 2025-26 season:

- FC ViOn Zlaté Moravce
- FC Petržalka
- MFK Dukla Banská Bystrica
- MŠK Považská Bystrica
- MFK Tatran Liptovský Mikuláš
- MŠK Žilina B
- FK POHRONIE Žiar nad Hronom Dolná Ždaňa
- FC ŠTK 1914 Šamorín
- ŠK Slovan Bratislava B
- MŠK Púchov
- OFK Dynamo Malženice
- MFK Zvolen
- Redfox FC Stará Ľubovňa
- Slávia TU Košice
- OFK Baník Lehota pod Vtáčnikom
- FK Inter Bratislava

=== Slovak 3rd division ===
The 3. Liga is the third-tier football league in Slovakia. From the 2025-26 season, it consists of three groups, East, Middle and West.

The list of participants in the 2025–26 season:

=== West ===
- Trenčín B
- Petržalka B
- Dunajská Streda B
- Komárno B
- Inter Bratislava
- Rača Brastialava
- Šaľa
- Nové Zámky
- FC Slovan Galanta
- FK Beluša
- TJ Družstevník Veľké Ludince
- Spartak Myjava
- OK Častkovce
- FC Baník Prievidza
- MŠK Senec

=== Middle ===
- Banská Bystrica B
- Ružomberok B
- Podkonice
- RSC Hamsik Academy
- MŠK Fomat Martin
- Bánová
- MŠK Rimavská Sobota
- Námestovo
- MFK Dolný Kubín
- Kalinovo
- Fiľakovo
- Lučenec
- MFK Bytča
- Oravské Veselé

=== East ===
- FK Humenné
- Košice B
- MFK Snina
- MFK Vranov nad Topľou
- FK Spišská Nová Ves
- MŠK Tesla Stropkov
- FK Poprad
- ŠK Odeva Lipany
- FC Lokomotíva Košice
- MŠK Spišské Podhradie
- Medzev
- 1. MFK Kežmarok
- Sabinov
- Raslavice

=== Slovak fourth league ===
The 4. Liga is the name that currently belongs to 4 leagues, all are run by their respective regional football associations (FAs). The leagues' names also contain the abbreviation of the regional FA they are run by, the term Majstrovstvo/Majstrovstváregiónu at the beginning and potentially a name of a sponsor.

The list of participating teams in the 2025–26 season:

| Bratislava | West | Middle | East |
|---|---|---|---|
| FC Rohožník | ŠKF Sereď | FK Čadca | Partizán Bardejov |
| FC Slovan Modra | FC Pata | FK Slávia Staškov | MFK Rožňava |
| FK Lokomotíva Devínska Nová Ves | PFK Piešťany | TJ Spartak Radôstka | FC Pivovar Šariš Veľký Šariš |
| FK Slovan Ivanka pri Dunaji | FK Slovan Levice | OŠK Baník Stráňavy | FK Čaňa |
| MŠK Kráľová pri Senci | Spartak Dubnica | OŠK Bešeňová | FK Gerlachov |
| MFK Rusovce | AFC Nové Mesto nad Váhom | ŠK Badín | FK Kechnec |
| FKM Karlova Ves Bratislava | ŠK Šoporňa | ŠK Javorník Makov | ŠK Záhradné |
| NŠK 1922 Bratislava | OFK Trebatice | ŠK Prameň Kováčová | FK Sobrance-Sobranecko |
| OFK Dunajská Lužná | OŠK Trenčianske Stankovce | TJ Partizán Osrblie | FK Slovan Kendice |
| PŠC Pezinok | ŠK LR CRYSTAL | OŠK Rosina | FK Geča 73 |
| SFC Kalinkovo | TJ Imeľ | FK FILJO Ladomerská Vieska | MŠK Spartak Medzilaborce |
| ŠK Bernolákovo | FC Nitra | TJ Sokol Medzibrod | TJ Sokol Ľubotice |
| ŠK Nová Dedinka | ŠK Blava 1928 | TJ Sokol Zubrohlava | OŠK Pavlovce nad Uhom |
| ŠK Tomášov | FK Bestrent Horná Krupá | TJ Tatran Krásno nad Kysucou | OŠK Rudňany |
| TJ Záhoran Jakubov | TJ Nafta Gbely | | |
| TJ Rovinka | TJ Slavoj Boleráz | | |

== Women's ==
=== Slovak Women's First League ===
As of the 2020–21 season, Slovak Women's First League comprises

- Partizán Bardejov
- Slovan Bratislava
- MŠK Žilina
- Spartak Myjava
- FC Nitra
- FC Petržalka
- FC Spartak Trnava
- AS Trenčín
- FK Poprad
- MFK Dukla Banská Bystrica

The Slovak Super Liga continues as the top tier of Slovak football in 2025, with 12 teams competing:

| Club | City | Stadium (Capacity) |
|---|---|---|
| Slovan Bratislava | Bratislava | Tehelné pole (22,500) |
| DAC Dunajská Streda | Dunajská Streda | MOL Aréna (12,700) |
| Žilina | Žilina | Štadión pod Dubňom (11,500) |
| Spartak Trnava | Trnava | Štadión Antona Malatinského (18,200) |
| Trenčín | Trenčín | Štadión Sihoť (10,100) |
| Ružomberok | Ružomberok | Štadión pod Čebraťom (4,900) |
| Podbrezová | Podbrezová | ZELPO Aréna (4,000) |
| Skalica | Skalica | Štadión MFK Skalica (2,000) |
| Košice | Košice | Košická futbalová aréna (5,000) |
| Zemplín Michalovce | Michalovce | Mestský futbalový štadión (4,400) |
| Zlaté Moravce | Zlaté Moravce | ViOn Aréna (4,500) |
| Dukla Banská Bystrica | Banská Bystrica | Štadión SNP (7,500) |
