= 2024–25 3. Liga (Slovakia) =

3. Liga
- Season: 2024–25
- Champions: Východ: Slávia TU Košice; Západ: Sereď
- Promoted: Východ: Slávia TU Košice; Západ: OFK Baník Lehota pod Vtáčnikom, FK Inter Bratislava
- Relegated: Východ: Partizán Bardejov; Západ: Krásno nad Kysucou

The 2024–25 3. Liga (Slovakia) is the 32nd edition of the third tier 3. Liga (Slovakia) since its establishment in 1993. 33 teams contested being divided into two geographic groups: 3. liga Západ (West) and 3. liga Východ (East).

== Západ (West) ==
=== Stadiums and locations ===
Location of teams in Slovak 3. liga 2024–25 West

Team	Location	Stadium	Capacity
FK Podkonice	Podkonice	Štadión na Brodku	800
FC Slovan Galanta	Galanta	Štadión FC Slovan Galanta	3,000
FK Beluša	Beluša	Stadium TJ KOVO Beluša	1,200
FK Slovan Duslo Šaľa	Šaľa	Šaľa Stadium	1,126
MŠK Fomat Martin	Martin	Areál Pltníky	1,200
RSC Hamsik Academy	Banská Bystrica	Stadium Rakytovce	1,500
Spartak Myjava	Myjava	Stadium Myjava	2,709
FC - Žolík Malacky	Malacky	Futbalový štadión - Zámocký park Malacky	260
FK Rača	Bratislava (Rača)	Štadión Rača	4,200
OFK Baník Lehota pod Vtáčnikom	Lehota pod Vtáčnikom	Futbalový štadión OFK Baník Lehota pod Vtáčnikom	800
ŠKF Sereď	Sereď	Štadión Sereď	2,800
OK Častkovce	Častkovce	Stadium OK Častkovce	1,500
TJ Družstevník Veľké Ludince	Veľké Ludince	Štadión TJ Družstevník Veľké Ludince	800
TJ Jednota Bánová	Žilina	Štadión TJ Jednota Bánová	570
TJ Tatran Krásno nad Kysucou	Krásno nad Kysucou	Stadium Tatran Krásno nad Kysucou	4,500
FKM Nové Zámky	Nové Zámky	Ladislav Ganczner Stadium	5,000
FK Inter Bratislava	Bratislava (Nové Mesto)	Štadión Pasienky	11,591

=== League table ===
Pos	Team	Pld	W	D	L	GF	GA	GD	Pts	Promotion or relegation
1	Sereď (C)	32	20	6	6	64	33	+31	66	
2	Lehota pod Vtáčnikom (P)	32	18	8	6	45	25	+20	62	Promotion to 2. Liga
3	Inter Bratislava (P)	32	19	4	9	63	30	+33	61	Promotion to 2. Liga
4	Rača	32	17	9	6	41	25	+16	60	
5	Malacky	32	15	7	10	47	29	+18	52	
6	Podkonice	32	14	10	8	36	29	+7	52	
7	Myjava	32	11	11	10	48	38	+10	44 (Note: Head-to-head goal difference: Myjava +10; Nové Zámky -4.)	
8	Nové Zámky	32	13	5	14	41	45	−4	44	
9	Slovan Duslo Šaľa	32	13	5	14	46	51	−5	44	
10	Beluša	32	12	7	13	46	49	−3	43	
11	Slovan Galanta	32	10	10	12	34	41	−7	40	
12	Veľké Ludince	32	10	9	13	45	50	−5	39	
13	Hamsik Academy	32	9	10	13	41	45	−4	37	
14	Martin	32	8	7	17	41	51	−10	31	
15	Bánová	32	7	8	17	26	56	−30	29	
16	Častkovce	32	7	5	20	31	65	−34	26	Possible relegation to 4. Liga
17	Krásno nad Kysucou (R)	32	5	7	20	26	59	−33	22	Relegation to 4. Liga

Source: sportnet.sme.sk
Rules for classification: 1) Points; 2) Head-to-head points; 3) Head-to-head goal difference; 4) Head-to-head away goals scored; 5) Play-off.
(C) Champions; (P) Promoted; (R) Relegated

== Východ (East) ==
=== Stadiums and locations ===
Location of teams in Slovak 3. liga 2024–25 East

Team	Location	Stadium	Capacity
FC Lokomotíva Košice	Košice (Sever)	Štadión Lokomotívy	9,000
MŠK Tesla Stropkov	Stropkov	Štadión MŠK Tesla Stropkov	2,500
MFK Snina	Snina	Mestský futbalový štadión	6,000
Slávia TU Košice	Košice (Sever)	Štadión TU Watsonova	1,000
MFK Vranov nad Topľou	Vranov nad Topľou	Stadium MFK Vranov nad Topľou	5,000
ŠK Odeva Lipany	Lipany	Štadión ŠK Odeva	4,000
FTC Fiľakovo	Fiľakovo	Štadión FTC Fiľakovo	3,000
FK Poprad	Poprad	NTC Poprad	5,700
MŠK Spišské Podhradie	Spišské Podhradie	Štadión Spišské Podhradie	600
FK Spišská Nová Ves	Spišská Nová Ves	Mestský štadión	4,000
TJ Baník Kalinovo	Kalinovo	Stadium TJ Baník Kalinovo	1,200
Partizán Bardejov	Bardejov	Mestský štadión Bardejov	3,040
MŠK Novohrad Lučenec	Lučenec	Mestský štadión	5,000
MFK Dolný Kubín	Dolný Kubín	Štadión MUDr. Ivana Chodáka	1,950
MŠK Rimavská Sobota	Rimavská Sobota	Na Záhradkách Stadium	5,000
MŠK Námestovo	Námestovo	Štadión MŠK Námestovo	2,000

=== League table ===
Pos	Team	Pld	W	D	L	GF	GA	GD	Pts	Promotion or relegation
1	Slávia TU Košice (C, P)	30	22	3	5	65	25	+40	69	Promotion to 2. Liga
2	Snina	30	18	6	6	53	32	+21	60	
3	Vranov nad Topľou	30	17	7	6	61	36	+25	58	
4	Spišská Nová Ves	30	16	7	7	51	30	+21	55	
5	Tesla Stropkov	30	15	4	11	53	40	+13	49	
6	Poprad	30	13	8	9	51	42	+9	47	
7	Odeva Lipany	30	13	7	10	45	48	−3	46	
8	Rimavská Sobota	30	12	4	14	70	56	+14	40	
9	Lokomotíva Košice	30	11	7	12	45	34	+11	40	
10	Námestovo	30	11	5	14	41	50	−9	38	
11	Dolný Kubín	30	9	8	13	43	59	−16	35	
12	Kalinovo	30	8	9	13	38	55	−17	33	
13	Fiľakovo	30	8	6	16	38	53	−15	30	
14	Lučenec	30	6	8	16	33	50	−17	26	
15	Spišské Podhradie	30	5	9	16	27	60	−33	24	Possible relegation to 4. Liga
16	Bardejov (R)	30	5	4	21	31	75	−44	19	Relegation to 4. Liga

Source: sportnet.sme.sk
Rules for classification: 1) Points; 2) Head-to-head points; 3) Head-to-head goal difference; 4) Head-to-head away goals scored; 5) Play-off.
(C) Champions; (P) Promoted; (R) Relegated

== See also ==
- 2024–25 Slovak First Football League
- 2024–25 2. Liga (Slovakia)
- 2024–25 Slovak Cup
