= 2023–24 3. Liga (Slovakia) =

3. Liga
- Season: 2023–24
- Matches: 450
- Goals: 1,411 (3.14 per match)

The 2023–24 3. Liga (Slovakia) was the 31st edition of the third tier 3. Liga (Slovakia) since its establishment in 1993. 32 teams contested being divided into two geographic groups of 16 teams each: 3. liga Západ (West) and 3. liga Východ (East).

== Západ (West) ==
Pos	Team	Pld	W	D	L	GF	GA	GD	Pts	Promotion or relegation
1	Zvolen (C, P)	30	18	8	4	50	29	+21	62	Promotion to 2. Liga
2	Sereď	30	16	8	6	55	28	+27	56	
3	Slovan Galanta	30	16	6	8	43	29	+14	54	
4	Beluša	30	14	8	8	47	37	+10	50	
5	Slovan Duslo Šaľa	30	13	10	7	52	37	+15	49	
6	Fomat Martin	30	13	9	8	51	44	+7	48	
7	Hamsik Academy Banská Bystrica	30	12	11	7	45	29	+16	47	
8	Malacky	30	11	9	10	42	32	+10	42	
9	Rača	30	10	10	10	39	32	+7	40	
10	Lehota pod Vtáčnikom	30	11	7	12	44	42	+2	40	
11	Častkovce	30	9	8	13	39	48	−9	35	
12	Podkonice	30	9	8	13	46	58	−12	35	
13	Družstevník Veľké Ludince	30	9	7	14	38	42	−4	34	
14	Jednota Bánová	30	7	10	13	33	41	−8	31	
15	Nové Mesto nad Váhom (R)	30	6	4	20	39	76	−37	22	Relegation to 4. Liga
16	Dubnica n. Váhom (R)	30	4	1	25	29	88	−59	13	Relegation to 4. Liga

Updated to match(es) played on unknown. Source: sportnet.sme.sk
Rules for classification: 1) Points; 2) Head-to-head points; 3) Head-to-head goal difference; 4) Head-to-head away goals scored; 5) Play-off.
(C) Champions; (P) Promoted; (R) Relegated

== Východ (Eastern) ==
=== League table ===
Pos	Team	Pld	W	D	L	GF	GA	GD	Pts	Promotion or relegation
1	Tesla Stropkov (C)	28	18	5	5	63	29	+34	59	Champion of the 3. Liga
2	Stará Ľubovňa (P)	28	17	5	6	59	34	+25	56	Promotion to 2. Liga
3	Odeva Lipany	28	16	3	9	56	33	+23	51	
4	Snina	28	13	9	6	60	41	+19	48	
5	Vranov nad Topľou	28	14	4	10	65	47	+18	46	
6	Slávia TU Košice	28	13	6	9	48	41	+7	45	
7	Fiľakovo	28	12	8	8	38	36	+2	44	
8	Rimavská Sobota	28	11	6	11	47	42	+5	39	
9	Námestovo	28	10	5	13	48	53	−5	35	
10	Lučenec	28	9	6	13	35	52	−17	33	
11	Spišské Podhradie	28	8	7	13	43	54	−11	31	
12	Oravské Veselé (R)	28	9	3	16	38	51	−13	30	Relegation to 4. Liga
13	Kalinovo	28	9	3	16	43	62	−19	30	
14	Bardejov	28	6	6	16	38	61	−23	24	
15	Svidník (R)	28	5	4	19	38	83	−45	19	Relegation to 4. Liga

Updated to match(es) played on unknown. Source: sportnet.sme.sk
Rules for classification: 1) Points; 2) Head-to-head points; 3) Head-to-head goal difference; 4) Head-to-head away goals scored; 5) Play-off.
(C) Champions; (P) Promoted; (R) Relegated

== See also ==
- 2023–24 Slovak First Football League
- 2023–24 2. Liga (Slovakia)
- 2023–24 Slovak Cup
