= MFK Nová Baňa =

Slovak football club

- Full name: MFK Nová Baňa
- Founded: 1912; 114 years ago
- Ground: Stadium MFK Nová Baňa, Nová Baňa
- Capacity: 1,000 (500)
- Chairman: Ján Juhás
- Head coach: Erik Jenes
- League: 3. liga
- 2013-14: 8th

MFK Nová Baňa is a Slovak football team, based in the town of Nová Baňa. The club was founded in 1912.

== History ==
In the 2022-23 season, Nová Baňa won the 3. Liga and qualified to the 2nd league.

In 2025, the club won the 6th league group C with 69 points.

In the 2025-26 Slovak cup, Nová Baňa lost to MŠK Rimavská Sobota 9–8 on penalties after drawing the game 2–2. 850 people came to the stands.

Former badge used by the club.
