= TJ Družstevník Trstice =

Slovak football club

- Full name: Telovýchovná jednota Družstevník Trstice
- Founded: 1946; 80 years ago
- League: 4. Liga (Slovakia)
- 2025–26: 5. Liga, 1st (promoted)

Telovýchovná jednota Družstevník Trstice (referred to as TJ Družstevník Trstice or FC Nádszeg Trstice) is a Slovak semi-professional football club based in the town of Trstice in the Trnava Region of Slovakia. The club plays in the 4. Liga after winning the 5. Liga in the 2025–26 season.

== History ==
In 2022 the club won the 5. Liga and advanced to the fourth tier. In the 2024–25 season, the club won the 5. Liga but chose not to be promoted. In the second round of the 2025–26 Slovak Cup, Trstice were drawn with the then champions of the first league, ŠK Slovan Bratislava. In the first 30 minutes, Družstevník Trstice were leading 2–0, but would go on to lose 4–2. Despite losing, it was still considered a shock result.

== See also ==
- List of football clubs in Slovakia
