= Ivan Lietava =

Slovak footballer

Personal information
- Full name: Ivan Lietava
- Date of birth: 20 July 1983 (age 43)
- Place of birth: Bratislava, Czechoslovakia
- Height: 1.89 m (6 ft 2 in)
- Position: Forward

Youth career
- Šenkvice
- ŠK Cífer

Senior career*
Years	Team	Apps	(Gls)
2001–2003	Spartak Trnava	18	(1)
2003–2006	Trenčín	79	(15)
2006–2007	Banská Bystrica	19	(6)
2007–2010	Žilina	67	(26)
2008–2009	→ Denizlispor (loan)	13	(3)
2010–2011	Konyaspor	9	(2)
2011–2012	Žilina	17	(3)
2011–2012	→ Dukla Prague (loan)	21	(11)
2012	Vorskla Poltava	8	(1)
2013	Spartak Trnava	8	(0)
2013	Sigma Olomouc	13	(2)
2014–	Bohemians 1905	36	(3)
2015	→ Skalica (loan)	17	(3)
2016	USV Atzenbrugg	?	(?)
2016–17	SV Ferschnitz	?	(?)
2018–2023	ŠK Báhoň	?	(11)
- * Club domestic league appearances and goals as of 10 June 2018

Ivan Lietava (born 20 July 1983) is a Slovak former professional footballer who played as a forward.

== Club career ==
Lietava previously played for Spartak Trnava, Trenčín, Banská Bystrica, Žilina in the Slovak Super Liga, with a spell in Denizlispor in the Süper Lig, before his return to Slovak side Žilina.

In September 2011, Lietava went on loan to Dukla Prague until the end of the season, scoring on his debut in a 4–0 win over Hradec Králové. Lietava finished the season as Dukla's leading goalscorer, having scored 11 goals in 21 league matches.

He announced his retirement in 2023.
