= OŠK Slovenský Grob =

Slovak football club

- Full name: OŠK Slovenský Grob
- Founded: 1932
- Ground: Stadium OŠK Slovenský Grob; Slovenský Grob
- Capacity: 700
- Head coach: Dušan Barkol
- League: 4. liga
- 2013–14: 6th

OŠK Slovenský Grob is a Slovak football team, based in the town of Slovenský Grob. The club was founded in 1932.

The football club focuses primarily on working with youth. In 2025, Slovenský Grob had more than 150 members, most of whom were young people.

== History ==
In the 2001–2002 season, OŠK Slovenský Grob played in the 2nd division of Slovak football. They finished in last place, getting relegated to the 3rd league.

On 30 July 2025, OŠK Slovenský Grob beat 4. Liga club PŠC Pezinok in the Slovak Cup.

== Notable players ==
The following players had international caps for their respective countries. Players whose name is listed in bold represented their countries while playing for Slovenský Grob.

Past (and present) players who are the subjects of Wikipedia articles can be found here.

- (Niger) Siradji Sani
