= 1. MFK Kežmarok =

Slovak football club

- Founded: 1907; 119 years ago
- Stadium: Kežmarok atletický štadión, Kežmarok, Slovakia
- Capacity: 1,500 (350 seats)
- President: Ján Nahalka
- League: 3. Liga, 2025–26
- Website: 1mfkkezmarok.sk

1. MFK Kežmarok (also simply known as MFK Kežmarok) is a Slovak association football club based in Kežmarok in the Prešov Region. The club currently plays in the 3. Liga, the third highest league in Slovakia. MFK Kežmarok covers around 11 youth categories and a senior team. Founded in 1907, it is one of the oldest clubs currently active in Slovakia.

== History ==
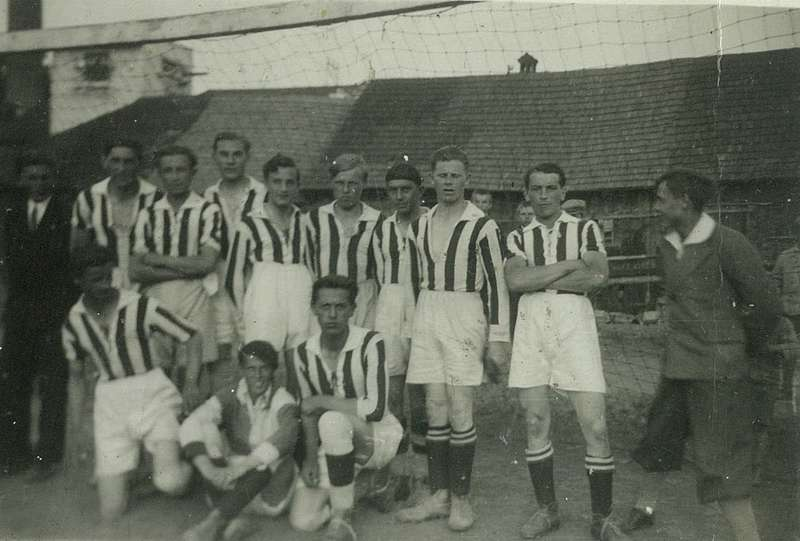
Kežmarok players in 1933

=== Early years ===
MFK Kežmarok was founded in 1907. Kežmarok played one season in the second division during the Czechoslovak times. In the post-war year of 1945–46, ŠK Kežmarok fought into the second league competition. However, due to reorganization, it dropped out. And it never returned to it. The club played in the 3. Liga in the 1968–69 season. At that time, due to the reorganization of competitions, Kežmarok would be once again relegated.

=== Recent years: Promotion ===
In 2023, Kežmarok was promoted to the 4. Liga, securing promotion in the last match of the season, a 10–0 win against Šarišské Dravce. In April 2025, the club was awarded the Grassroots 2025 award for the best amateur club in their region. In the 2024–25 season, the club advanced to the 3. Liga for the first time since the split of Czechoslovakia. Kežmarok got their first victory in a 3–0 win over the reserve team of FC Košice. Since the Košice B team fielded 5 players from outside of Slovakia, the team would have to forfeit the match.

== Stadium ==
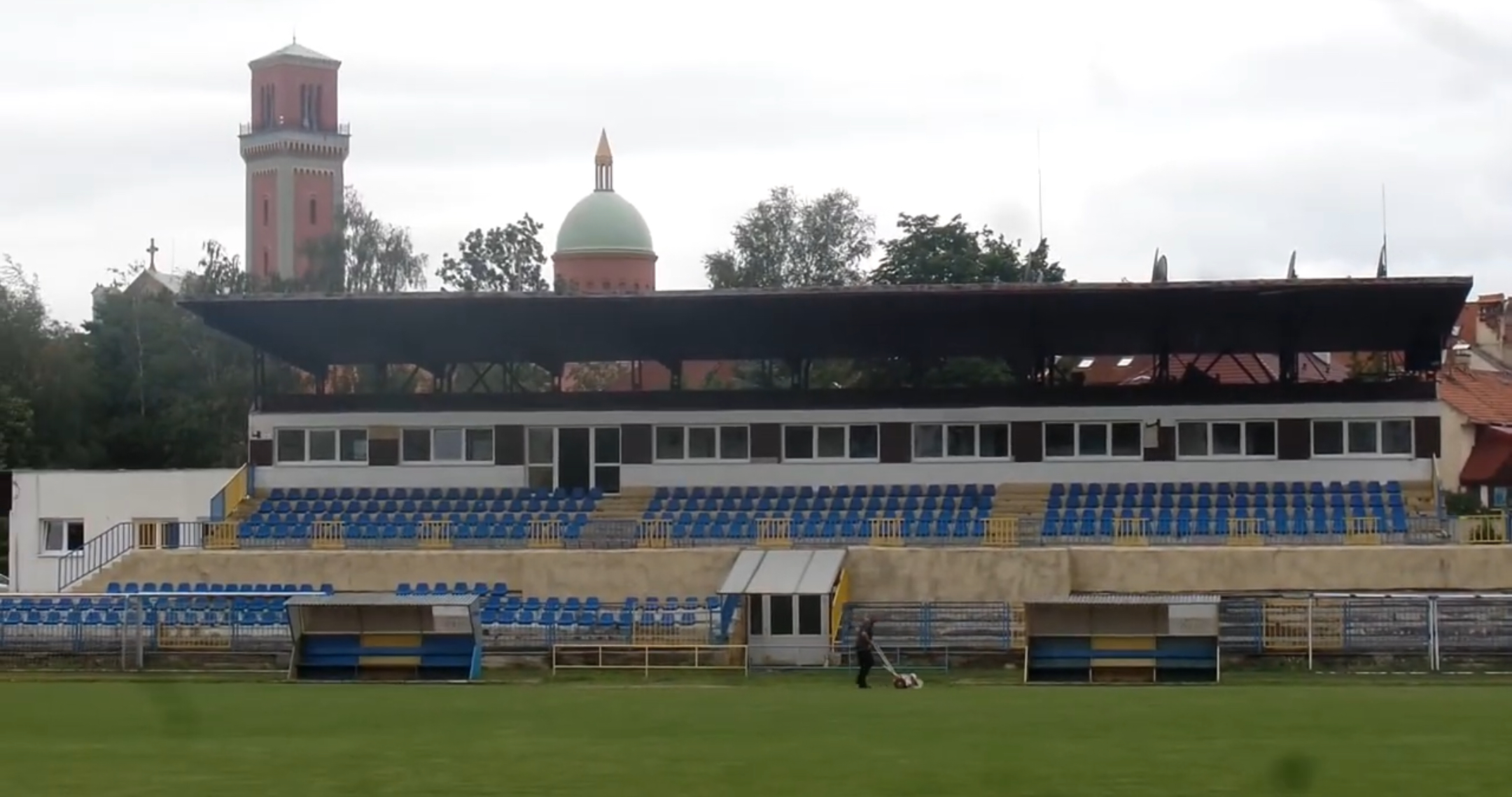
The stadium in 2021

MFK Kežmarok currently plays their home games in the Kežmarok atletický štadión. The stadium was ceremonially opened on 7 August 1993. The grandstand has a seating capacity of 350. Located above the grandstand is a room designated for the stadium's sound system, as well as a commentator's booth. Additionally, the grandstand includes changing rooms, a referee's cabin, and areas reserved for VIPs. The playing field measures 100 by 60 meters. In March 2025, parts of the stadium were reconstructed. It was mainly funded by the project Fondu na podporu športu. A training field was also built besides it.

== Rivals ==
Kežmarok's biggest rival is the neighboring club FK Poprad. Matches between the teams are called the Podtatranské derby and is considered one of the biggest matches in the lower leagues. In the last Podtatranské derby, Kežmarok would win 4–1.

== See also ==
- List of football clubs in Slovakia
