= FK Sobrance-Sobranecko =

Slovak football club

FK Sobrance -Sobranecko
- Full name: Futbalový klub Sobrance -Sobranecko
- Founded: 1991
- Ground: Štadión Sobrance, Sobrance, Slovakia
- Capacity: 1,000 (300 seats)
- Head coach: Jozef Kročko
- League: 3. Liga (East)
- Website: http://www.fkrevistia.sk/

FK Sobrance-Sobranecko (formerly known as FK Veľké Revištie) is a Slovak association football club located in Sobrance. It currently plays in 4. Liga East.

The club was founded after the merge between TJ Veľké Revištia and MFK Sobrance. The club currently acts as a feeder club for Slovak First Football League club MFK Zemplín Michalovce.

Sobrance-Sobranecko is coached by Jozef Kročko, who used to play for the club in the 2003/04 season.

== History ==
=== Early years ===
The first mention of organized football in Veľké Revištie dates back to 1947. The players of Veľké Revištie were among the stable participants of the district and, over time, regional competitions. In the 1991/92 season, the club’s youth team won the district competition. In the following season, 1992/93, saw a change in the player roster, when all of these winners at the age of 16 were chosen to play for the A-team. This generation finished in 3rd place with a record of 11 wins, 6 draws and 9 losses from 26 matches, with a score of 60:44.

=== Recent years: 2019–present ===
In 2019, the club would be merged between TJ Veľké Revištia and the fourth league MFK Sobrance to create FK Sobrance-Sobranecko. Following the merge, Sobrance would return to the 3. Liga after 10 years. Later that year in 2020, Sobrance-Sobranecko became a feeder club to Slovak First Football League side MFK Zemplín Michalovce. In the 2025–26 Slovak Cup, the club was drawn with Zemplín Michalovce. They would go on to lose the game 10–0.

== Stadium ==
FK Sobrance-Sobranecko currently plays their home games in the Štadión Sobrance. In 2018, the stadium was reconstructed, with 25,000 euros being contributed from the Slovak Football Association.

== Notable players ==
- (Ukraine) Artem Dmytriyev
