= OK Častkovce =

Slovak football club

- Full name: Obecný Klub Častkovce
- Ground: Stadium OK Častkovce, Častkovce
- Capacity: 1,500 (300 seats)
- President: Mgr. Dušan Bublavý
- Coach: Peter Majerník
- League: 3. liga (West)
- 2025-26: 3. liga (West), 9th
- Website: https://klub.okcastkovce.sk/

OK Častkovce is a Slovak football team, based in the village of Častkovce, founded in 1920.

== Stadium ==
The football stand area contains two apartment units, football club offices, V.I.P. areas, guest changing rooms, adult changing room, youth and student changing room, and referee changing room. Each changing room has sanitary facilities.

== History ==
In the 3rd round of the 2024–25 Slovak Cup, Častkovce welcomed first division side FC Spartak Trnava to their stadium. Spartak won the game 7–1 with hat tricks from Jakub Paur and Róbert Pich.

=== League and Cup history ===
Slovakia (1993–)
Season	Division (Name)	Level	M	W	D	L	GS	GA	+/-	P	Position
1993/94	6th (I. B trieda SEVER)	6	30	9	6	15	46	66	-20	24	13.
1994/95	6th (I. B trieda SEVER)	6	30	10	11	9	36	36	0	41	12.
1995/96	6th (I. B trieda SEVER)	6	28	12	3	13	52	41	+11	39	4.
1996/97	6th (I. B trieda SEVER)	6	30	12	8	10	39	44	-5	41	8.
1997/98	5th (V. liga - sk. A)	5	30	12	3	15	51	51	0	39	10.
1998/99	5th (V. liga - sk. A)	5	30	15	4	11	52	44	+8	49	5.
1999/00	5th (V. liga - sk. A)	5	30	11	6	13	69	56	+13	39	11.
2000/01	5th (5. Liga)	5	30	13	4	13	69	64	+5	69	8.
2001/02	6th (5. Liga)	6	29	21	6	2	112	19	+93	43	1.
2002/03	5th (5. Liga)	5	30	18	4	8	87	44	+43	58	2.
2003/04	5th (5. Liga)	5	30	22	3	5	84	26	+58	69	2.
2004/05	4th (4. Liga)	4	28	16	2	10	64	34	+30	50	4.
2005/06	4th (4. Liga)	4	30	20	2	8	72	38	+34	62	5.
2006/07	4th (4. Liga)	4	30	17	5	8	87	47	+40	56	4.
2007/08	4th (4. Liga)	4	30	11	7	12	68	53	+15	40	7.
2008/09	4th (4. Liga)	4	30	15	7	8	58	31	+29	52	5.
2009/10	4th (4. Liga)	4	28	15	5	8	60	41	+19	50	4.
2010/11	4th (4. Liga)	4	30	17	4	9	59	41	+18	55	4.
2011/12	4th (4. Liga)	4	30	18	5	7	66	35	+31	59	3.
2012/13	4th (4. Liga)	4	22	8	7	7	46	26	+20	31	8.
2013/14	4th (4. Liga)	4	30	13	5	12	70	38	+48	44	8.
2014/15	4th (4. Liga)	4	30	12	5	13	45	49	-4	41	9.
2015/16	4th (4. Liga)	4	30	15	5	10	49	36	+13	50	5.
2016/17	4th (4. Liga)	4	28	9	8	11	26	35	-9	35	9.
2017/18	4th (4. Liga)	4	26	15	5	6	65	29	+36	50	4.
2018/19	4th (4. Liga)	4	26	16	4	6	48	23	+25	52	2.
2019/20	4th (4. Liga)	4	16	14	1	1	54	11	+43	43	1.
2020-21	3rd (III. liga)	3	15	7	2	6	20	19	+1	23	8.
2021-22	3rd (III. liga)	3	34	15	7	12	67	40	+27	52	7.
2022-23	3rd (III. liga)	3	28	12	11	5	51	36	+15	47	5.
2023–24	3rd (III. liga)	3	30	9	8	13	39	48	-9	35	12.
2024–25	3rd (III. liga)	3	32	7	5	20	31	65	-34	26	16.
2025–26	3rd (III. liga)	3	30	11	9	10	59	47	+12	42	9.

== Notable players ==
- (Slovakia) Peter Sládek
