= ŠK Cífer =

Slovak football club

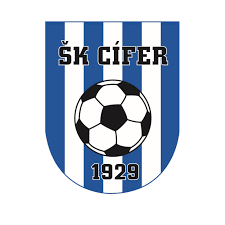
- Full name: Športový klub Cífer 1929
- Founded: 1929 (96 years ago)
- League: 5. Liga (5th league)
- 2024–25: Winners
- Website: https://www.skcifer.sk/
Home colours

Športový klub Cífer 1929 (commonly referred to as ŠK Cífer or simply Cífer) is a Slovak football club based in the village of Cífer in the Trnava Region. They currently play in the 6th division of the Slovak Football League.

== History ==
=== Early years ===
Football began to develop in Cífer in 1925 thanks to students who formed a local football team. However, it played only a few friendly matches and ended its activities. The beginnings of football life in Cífer are linked to the years 1928–1929. In October 1929, a football club was officially founded under the name ŠK Cífer, which overcame many financial shortcomings and internal disagreements.

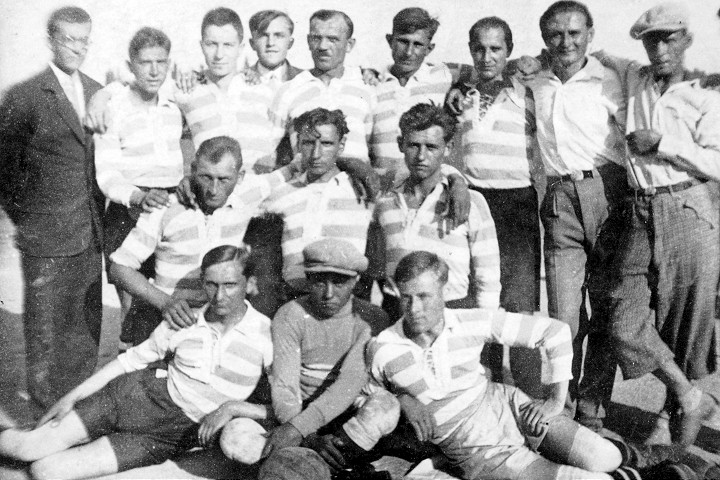
Cífer players in 1932. From the top row to the right; Jozef Jankovič, Gejza Kramár, Rudolf Krutý, Jozef Krajčovič, Imrich Čechovič, František Stuchlík, Jozef Šmičko, Viliam Lanák, neznámy civil, stredný rad zľava: Jaroslav Gross, Štefan Kucman, Dominik Kralovič, dolný rad zľava: Peter Zofčík, Ján Holič and Július Dulovič.

After the fall of communism and the establishment of an independent Slovakia, the team began to do well again. In the 1995–1996 season, the team fought its way from the III. class to the regional competition. A year later, in the 1996–1997 season, it returned to the district competition. In the 1999–2000 season, the team returned to the regional competition of the 5th league, group C, after 30 years. However, in the 2001–2002 season, after an extensive reorganization of the Slovak football leagues, they dropped out to the highest regional competition OM, although they finished in 10th place in the competition of 16 teams.

=== Recent years ===
In 2024, Cífer won the seventh division with 64 points and only 2 losses, being unbeaten in all home games.

In 2025, Cífer won the sixth league with 60 points, 3 more than league runners up Družstevník Hlboké. They played in the sixth league 23 years prior to winning it. In the same year they advanced to the second round of the Slovak Cup, beating Slovan Hlohovec on penalties 9–8.

That year, when the football club from Cífer celebrated its 95th anniversary, its A-team also started in the 4th year of the Prezidentského pohára (President's Cup), intended for the winners of amateur competitions of the 6th leagues, which are managed by regional football associations in Slovakia. They got drawn with 4. Liga club FC Nitra, where Cífer lost 5–0.

== Ground ==
In 1948, the construction of a stadium began in Cífer. However, this action did not end there, only one playground and an athletics track were built, which was opened in 1952. After 1948, changes occurred in the organization of physical education, which resulted in internal changes in the physical education units, and thus also in the football sections.

== Notable players ==
Had international caps for their respective countries. Players whose name is listed with a bold represented their countries while playing for ŠK Cífer.

Past (and present) players.

- (Slovakia) Ivan Lietava
- (Slovakia) Karol Štajer
