= ŠK Šurany =

Slovak football club

- Full name: ŠK Šurany
- Founded: 1931 as Nagysurányi SE
- Ground: Stadium ŠK Šurany, Šurany, Slovakia
- Capacity: 700 (500 seats)
- President: Dušan Rampašek
- Head coach: Tomas Kutka
- League: 4. Liga
- 2017–18: 4. Liga, 4th

ŠK Šurany is a Slovak association football club located in Šurany. The club was founded in 1931.

== Colors and badge ==
Its colors are light blue and black.

== League history ==
Slovak League only (1993–present)

Season	Division (Name)	Pos./Teams	Pl.	W	D	L	GS	GA	P	Slovak Cup	Top Scorer (Goals)
1993–94	6th (regional league)	1/(16)	30	22	5	3	82	26	49	Did not enter	
1994–95	5th (regional league)	?/(16)							?	Did not enter	
1995–96	5th (regional league)	1/(16)							?	Did not enter	
1996–97	4th (regional league)	6/(16)	30	13	9	8	54	41	48	Did not enter	
1997–98	4th (regional league)	?/(16)							?	Did not enter	
1998–99	4th (regional league)	?/(16)							?	Did not enter	
1999–00	4th (regional league)	?/(16)							?	Did not enter	
2000–01	4th (regional league)	?/(16)							?	Did not enter	
2001–02	5th (regional league)	6/(15)	28	14	2	12	61	42	44	Did not enter	
2012–13	4th (regional league)	2/(16)	30	18	6	6	56	27	60	Did not enter	
2013–14	4th (regional league)	2/(16)	30	20	5	5	75	24	65	Did not enter	
2014–15	4th (regional league)	10/(16)	30	11	7	12	54	39	37	Did not enter	
2015–16	4th (regional league)	2/(16)	30	20	4	6	71	36	64	Did not enter	
2016–17	3rd (regional league)	17/(19)	36	11	6	19	55	79	39	Did not enter	
2017–18	4th (regional league)	4/(16)	30	15	7	8	54	36	52	Did not enter	
