= TJ Sokol Zubrohlava =

Slovak football club

Sokol Zubrohlava
- Founded: 1947; 79 years ago
- Stadium: Futbalové ihrisko v Zubrohlava
- League: 4. Liga

TJ Sokol Zubrohlava (also known simply as Sokol Zubrohlava) is a Slovak football club based in the village of Zubrohlava in the Žilina Region of Slovakia. The club currently competes in the 4. Liga central, the fourth highest level of football in Slovakia. From the Orava regional leagues, the club made its way up to the highest regional leagues, where they would win the 5. Liga in 2022.

== History ==
=== Early years ===
TJ Sokol Zubrohlava was founded in 1947. In 1951 the club was already playing in the higher Orava competitions. In 1954, the SOKOL physical education unit was operating in the village, leading it to become the main sponsor of the club.

=== 2019–present: Recent years and success ===
Between 2019 and 2021, the club would not lose a single league game. In the 2019/2020 season, Sokol Zubrohlava won the 5. Liga, but due to the Covid-19 pandemic, their promotion would be cancelled. In 2022, the club won the fifth league, winning 24 matches and losing only 2. In that season, some Sokol matches would have attendances higher that those in the Slovak first division. In 2023, the club was drawn with MFK Ružomberok in the cup, where they lost by a score of 3–0. In the 2025-26 fourth league season, Sokol would be the only team from the Orava region to play in the competition. In September 2025, the club was drawn with first division club MŠK Žilina in the 2025–26 Slovak Cup. Sokol went on to lose the game 8–0.

== Rivals ==
Sokol Zubrohlava shares a rivalry with neighboring club ŠK Tvrdošín. Matches between the two clubs are called the Oravské derby.

== Honors ==
Domestic

- 5. Liga 2021–22: Winners

== See also ==
- List of football clubs in Slovakia
