= ŠK Báhoň =

Slovak football club

- Full name: ŠK Báhoň
- Ground: Stadium ŠK Báhoň, Báhoň, Slovakia
- Chairman: TBA
- Head coach: Miroslav Karhan
- League: 3. Liga
- 2013–2014: 11th

ŠK Báhoň is a Slovak association football club located in Báhoň. It currently plays in 3. liga (3rd tier in Slovak football system).

== Colors and badge ==
Its colors are red and black.

== Notable Managers ==
- Marián Tibenský
- Marián Šarmír
- Miroslav Karhan
