= Veľké Revištia =

Veľké Revištia Felsőrőcse
- Municipality
- Flag

- Location of Veľké Revištia in the Košice Region Location of Veľké Revištia in Slovakia
- Coordinates: 48.74°N 22.09°E
- Country: Slovakia
- Region: Košice Region
- District: Sobrance District
- First mentioned: 1335

Area
  - Total: 10.19 km^{2} (3.93 sq mi)
- Elevation: 110 m (360 ft)

Population (2025)
  - Total: 484
- Time zone: UTC+1 (CET)
  - Summer (DST): UTC+2 (CEST)
- Postal code: 724 3
- Area code: +421 56
- Vehicle registration plate (until 2022): SO
- Website: www.velkerevistia.sk

Veľké Revištia (Hungarian: Felsőrőcse) is a village and municipality in the Sobrance District in the Košice Region of east Slovakia.

== History ==
In historical records the village was first mentioned in 1335.

== Geography ==
The municipality lies at an altitude of 110 metres (360 ft) and covers an area of 10.19 km^{2} (3.93 sq mi) (2025).

== Population ==
Population statistic (10 years)
Year	1995	2005	2015	2025
Count	573	531	520	484
Difference		−7.32%	−2.07%	−6.92%

Population statistic
Year	2024	2025
Count	493	484
Difference		−1.82%

It has a population of 484 people (31 December 2025).

=== Ethnicity ===
Census 2021 (1+ %)
Ethnicity	Number	Fraction
Slovak	495	98.4%
Rusyn	7	1.39%
Total	503	

In year 2021 was 503 people by ethnicity 495 as Slovak, 7 as Rusyn, 5 as Not found out, 4 as Czech, 2 as Hungarian, 2 as Other, 1 as Irish, 1 as Romani, 1 as Polish and 1 as German.

Note on population: The difference values of population numbers in the table "Population statistic" and in the sections "Ethnicity" & "Religion" is caused by the use of various statistical methods.

=== Religion ===
Census 2021 (1+ %)
Religion	Number	Fraction
Roman Catholic Church	275	54.67%
Greek Catholic Church	85	16.9%
Calvinist Church	55	10.93%
None	37	7.36%
Eastern Orthodox Church	22	4.37%
Evangelical Church	13	2.58%
Apostolic Church	7	1.39%
Total	503	

In year 2021 was 503 people by religion 275 from Roman Catholic Church, 85 from Greek Catholic Church, 55 from Calvinist Church, 37 from None, 22 from Eastern Orthodox Church, 13 from Evangelical Church, 7 from Apostolic Church, 5 from Not found out, 1 from Jehovah's Witnesses, 1 from Other, 1 from Hinduism and 1 from Ad hoc movements.

== Facilities ==
The village has a public library, gymnasium and a soccer pitch. The local club TJ FK Veľké Revistia is currently playing the IV. league south in the eastern region, which is the fifth highest league in Slovakia. Notable players are Štefan Grendel, the father of the Slovakia national football team player Erik Grendel, and Dušan Sninský.
