= MŠK Kráľová pri Senci =

Slovak football club

- Full name: MŠK Kráľová pri Senci
- Ground: Kráľová pri Senci
- Manager: Branislav Fodrek
- League: 3. liga
- 2013–14: 4th

MŠK Kráľová pri Senci is a Slovak football team, based in the town of Kráľová pri Senci.
