= MŠK Spartak Medzilaborce =

Slovak football club

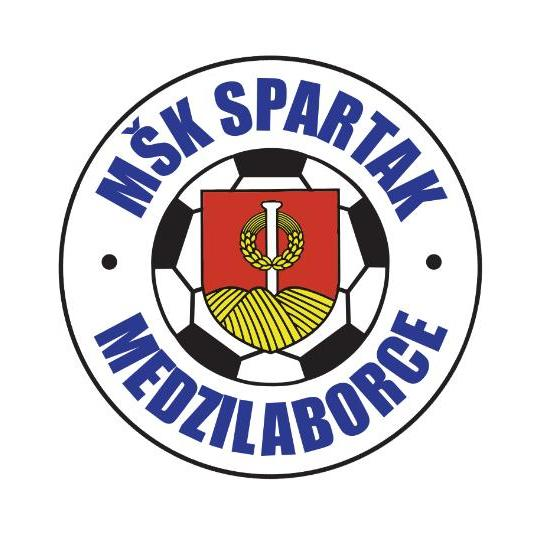
- Full name: Mestský športový klub Spartak Medzilaborce
- Founded: 1922; 104 years ago
- Stadium: Štadión v Medzilaborciach
- League: 4.Liga

MŠK Spartak Medzilaborce is a Slovak football club based in the city of Medzilaborce, that was founded in 1922. Currently, the club is a participant in the 4. Liga East.

== History ==
=== Founding ===
In 1922, the club was founded under the name AFK Medzilaborce, which formed after to the establishment of the Sokol organization in the city, which organized local academies, celebrations, cultural, social and sports events. Historically, the first team was composed of Czech officers, officials and financiers who already had experience with active football activities when they arrived in Medzilaborce. A slightly flatter area by the Laborec River behind the railway station in the part of the city called Podňagovčík served as a training ground. In 1922, the club participated in the championship of the Eastern Slovak County in the 2nd district (Košice district), where it finished in last 8th place. Although the conditions for participation in the competition were not created, football enthusiasts from the city and the surrounding area organized occasional non-competitive meetings, in which young men and boys also participated.

=== Early years ===
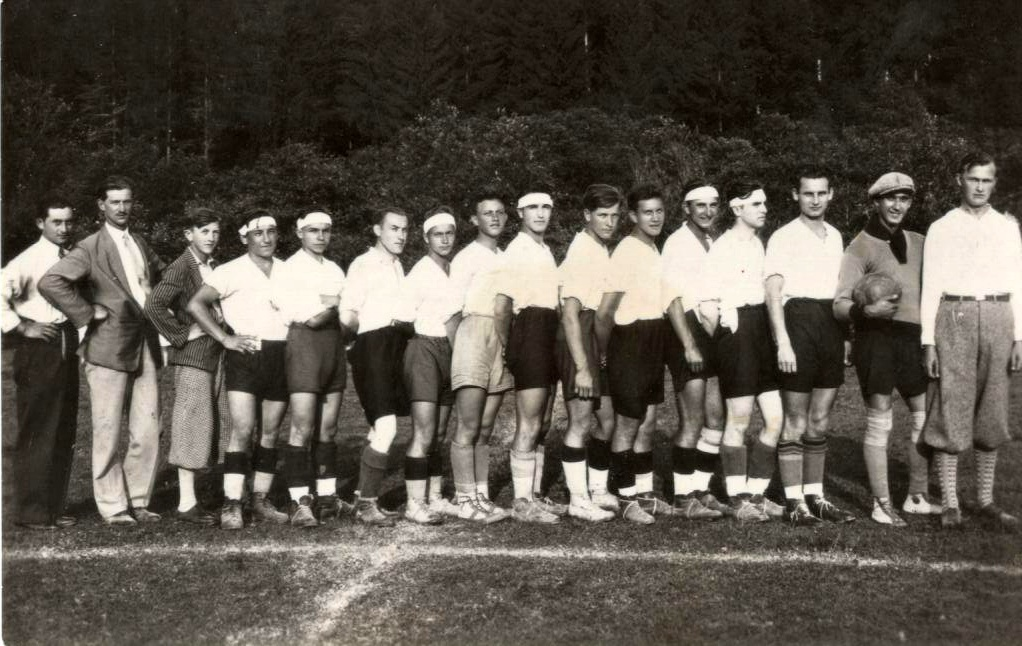
The club’s players in the early 1930s.

In 1930, the ŠK Rusj Medzilaborce club was founded. The majority of the players were teachers of Ruthenian origin. The team needed to deal with a difficult economic situation, the lack of funds did not allow the purchase of basic equipment for football players. Therefore, the players had to buy the equipment themselves and only a certain part of the funds came from charitable donations from Jewish merchants and selected entrance fees. The first real jerseys were purchased only in 1929. The team only participated in friendly matches and, since it could not afford to travel by train, it played matches only with teams from the districts of Zemplén County. In 1937, it also participated in the East Slovak football competition, which was facilitated by the sports section of the Alexander Duchnovič Society. Under the influence of the gradual rise of the HSĽS to power during 1938, a necessary condition for participation in the regional competition was to change the name to ŠK HG Medzilaborce. Since most of the club members refused to fulfill this condition, the team was prohibited from playing in competitions until the end of World War II. During that period, the Medzilaborce footballers played only occasional friendly matches against clubs from the surrounding towns, Stropkov, Svidník, Humenné, Vranov nad Topľou, and Michalovce.

=== Golden years: 1970s ===
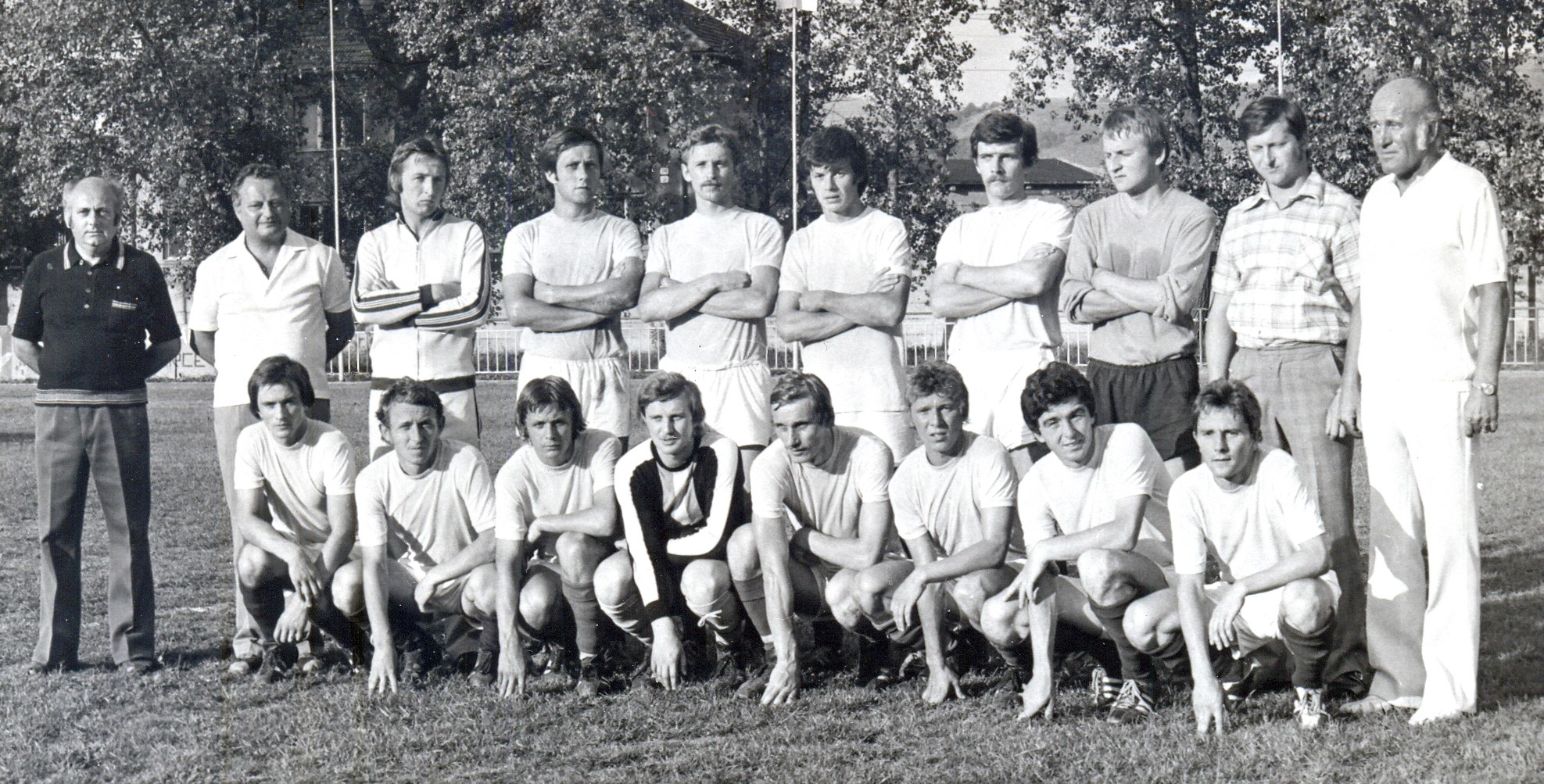
The team in the 1978/79 season

The most successful period in the history of the football club was the 1970s. The construction of the new Jablonec Glassworks in Medzilaborce also contributed to the improvement of conditions. The central heating in the stadium's back yard was reconstructed, a training pitch was established, and the main playing field was reconstructed when a new lawn was laid. In 1971, the first official club flag was created, which featured 3 colours – blue, white and yellow, the variations of which changed over time. It consisted of the club's name and in the centre was a circle containing an irregular geometric shape with a letter symbolising the name of the club. A prerequisite for improving results was the leadership of the youth and school categories. The improvement of conditions led to the fact that in 1972 the adult and youth teams advanced to the regional championships in their categories.

=== Recent years: 2014–present ===
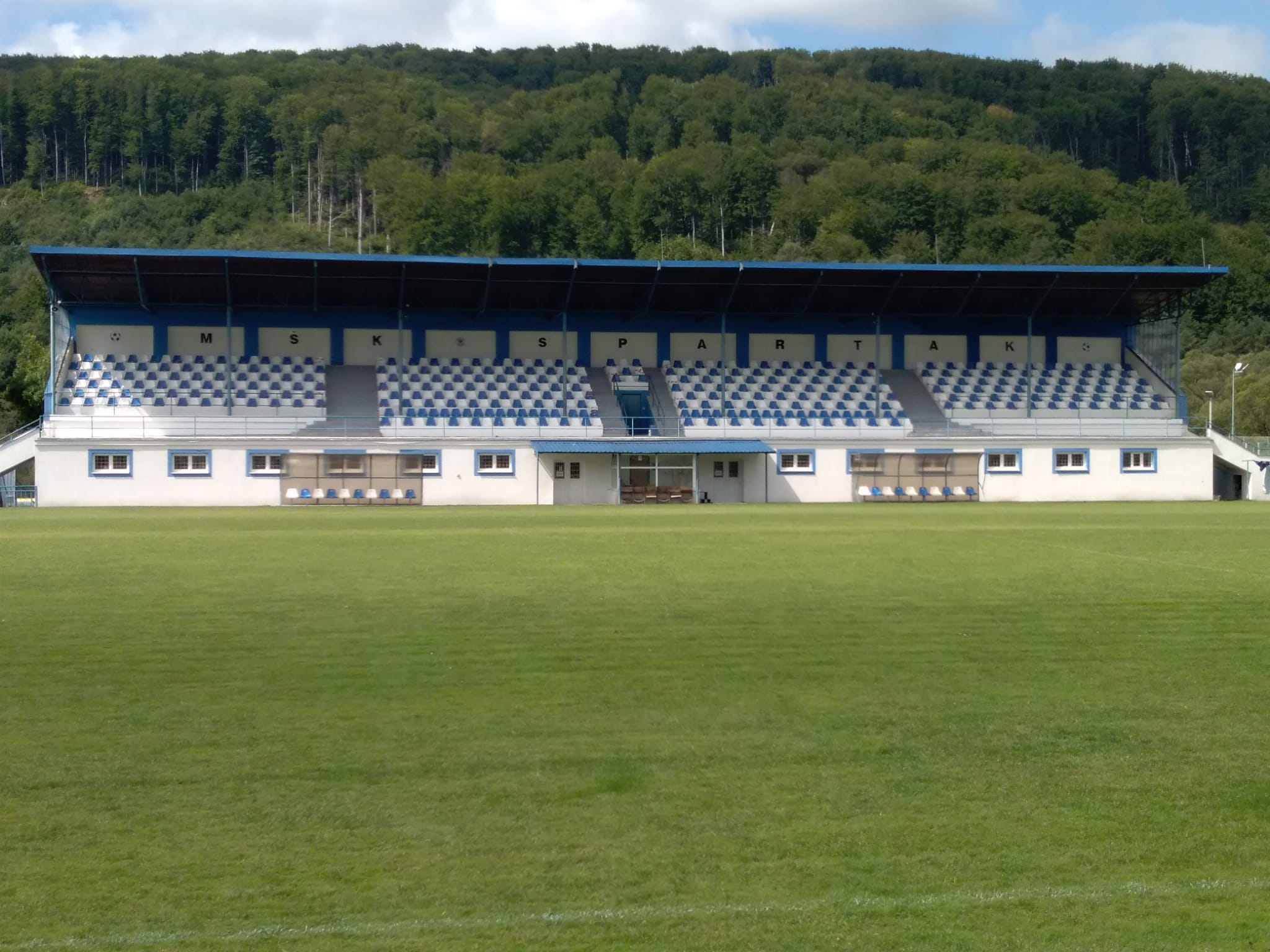
The club’s stadium

In 2014 and 2015, the club’s stadium was completely reconstructed with the help of EU funds. During the summer of 2018, a central lawn irrigation system was installed. The club achieved a good result in the 2017/18 season, when the youth team led by Vladimír Gavula won the III. league of the Šarišsko-Dukelská group. The club achieved great success in the 2019/20 Slovnaft Cup, when it advanced to the 4th round, where they were eliminated by MFK Dukla Banská Bystrica after a 1–2 loss. In the 2019/20 season, the team finished in 5th place in the autumn part of the IV. league north VsFZ. As a result of the Covid-19 pandemic, which brought certain restrictions to the field of sports, the association annulled the results of the spring part of the competition.

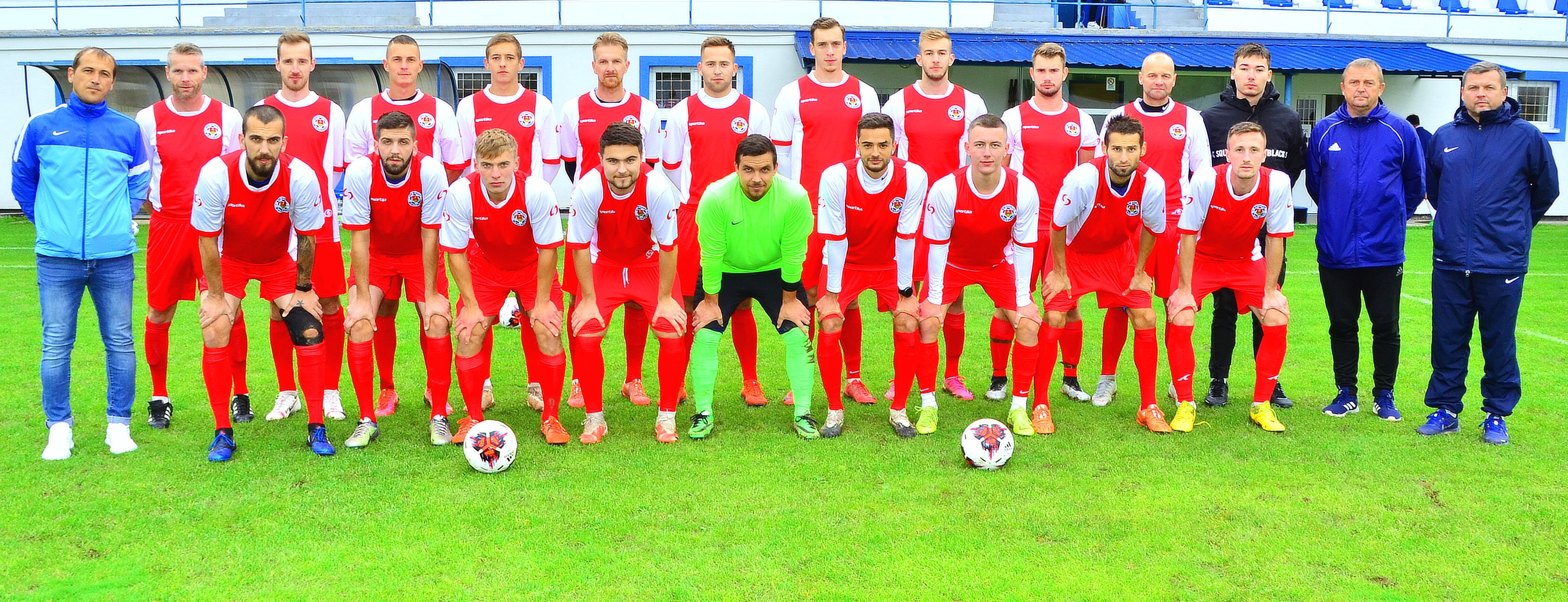
The squad ahead of the 2021-22 season

The most significant season for the club in recent years has been the 2021/22 season, when, with the upcoming 100th anniversary, it achieved positive results, finishing in 4th place during the Autumn. In order to prepare for the spring part, the team played friendly matches with FK Humenné, MFK Snina and Partizán Bardejov. At the end of the season, the club finished in 5th place in the promotion round.

On July 2, 2022, the town of Medzilaborce organized celebrations on the occasion of the 100th anniversary of organized football in Medzilaborce. As part of the ceremony, 68 former players, coaches and officials were awarded.

== Club names ==
- 1922: AFK Medzilaborce
- 1930: ŠK Rusj Medzilaborce
- 1952: DŠO Tatran Medzilaborce
- 1957: DŠO Lokomotíva Medzilaborce
- 1962: TJ Spartak Transporta Medzilaborce
- 1966: TJ Spartak Mostáreň Medzilaborce
- 1973: TJ Spartak Vihorlat Medzilaborce
- 1997: ŠK Štart Medzilaborce
- 2007: MŠK Spartak Medzilaborce

== Notable players ==
- (Slovakia) Igor Žofčák

== Sources ==
- HORÁK, Jindřich; KRÁL, Lubomír. Encyklopedie našeho fotbalu. 1.. vyd. [s.l.] : [s.n.]. 701 s. ISBN 978-808-598-322-7. (po česky) PAJTAŠ, Ivan. Chemlon, do toho!. 1.. vyd. [s.l.] : Tlačiareň svidnícka, 2007. ISBN 978-80-969-6551-9.
- CEPKO, Vladimír. 90 rokov futbalu v Medzilaborciach. 1.. vyd. Medzilaborce : Mestský úrad, Medzilaborce, 2012. 143 s. ISBN 978-80-971068-2-9.
- CEPKO, Vladimír. Od AFK Meteor po MŠK Spartak. 1. vyd. Svidník : Tlačiareň svidnícka, 2023. 447 strán. ISBN 978-80-89755-93-6.
