= FC - Žolík Malacky =

Slovak football club

- Full name: FC - Žolík Malacky
- Founded: 2013; 13 years ago
- Ground: Futbalový štadión - Zámocký park Malacky, Malacky
- Capacity: 260
- Head coach: Marián Tóth
- League: 4. Liga
- 2025-26: 15th (relegated)

FC - Žolík Malacky is a Slovak football team, based in the town of Malacky, that competes in the 3. Liga, the 3rd tier of Slovak football.

== Colours ==
Club colours are red and orange.
