= OFK Trebatice =

Slovak football club

- Full name: OFK Trebatice
- Ground: Futbalové ihrisko, Trebatice, Slovakia
- Capacity: 1,000 (120 seats)
- Chairman: Jozef Svetlík
- Manager: Vladimír Hornáček
- League: 4. Liga West (North-western group)
- 2020-21: 11th

OFK Trebatice is a municipal Slovak association football club based in the village of Trebatice in the Trnava Region. It currently plays in 4. Liga West (North-western group). The club functions on an amateur basis, with player having non-sporting employments. The club is affiliated with the Jozef Adamec academy.

== History ==
=== Recent years: Promotion and cup success ===
In the 2017/18 season, Trebatice was promoted to the 4. Liga. For the last few seasons the club had been the favorite for promotion in the 5. Liga, but where only able to do so when the fifth league had only six participants after the reorganization of the competitions. In 2021–22 edition of the Slovak Cup, OFK Trebatice successfully defeated former Slovak champions FC Petržalka. They won the game 2–1 in front of over 1,300 spectators, of which 500 were paying. Trebatice went on to lose the next round 9–0 at home against First League side FC ViOn Zlaté Moravce.

== Rivals ==
OFK Trebatice holds a rivalry with neighboring club PFK Piešťany. Matches between the two clubs are called the Piešťansky derby. The also share a derby match with MFK Vrbové.

== Stadium ==
Trebatice currently plays their home matches in the Štadión Trebatice, which has a capacity of just over 1,000 seats.

== Honors ==
Domestic

- 5. Liga: 2017–2018

== See also ==
- List of football clubs in Slovakia
