= ŠK Bernolákovo =

Slovak football club

- Full name: ŠK Bernolákovo
- Founded: 1912
- Ground: Štadión Jána Popluhára, Bernolákovo
- Capacity: 300
- Chairman: Milan Rajter
- League: 3. liga
- 2013–14: 8th

ŠK Bernolákovo is a Slovak football team, based in the town of Bernolákovo. The club was founded in 1912.
