= ŠK Javorník Makov =

Slovak football club

- Full name: ŠK Javorník Makov
- Founded: 1933
- Ground: Stadium ŠK Javorník Makov, Makov, Slovakia
- Capacity: 500 (200)
- Head coach: Ivan Kostelný
- League: 3. Liga
- 2013–2014: 1st (promoted)
- Website: http://skmakov.tym.sk/?page=klub&p=166

ŠK Javorník Makov is a Slovak association football club located in Makov. It currently plays in 4. liga (4th tier in Slovak football system). The club was founded in 1933.

== Notable players ==
The following player had senior international caps for his country:

- (Slovakia) Viktor Pečovský
