= OŠK Trenčianske Stankovce =

Slovak football club

- Full name: OŠK Trenčianske Stankovce
- Founded: 1972
- Ground: Oddychové centrum, Trenčianske Stankovce, Slovakia
- Capacity: 400 (80 seats)
- Chairman: Vendelín Sedláček
- Manager: Roman Pevný
- League: Majstrovstvá regiónu (West)
- 4. liga SZ: 2nd (promoted)
- Website: http://www.osktrencianskestankovce.sk/

OŠK Trenčianske Stankovce is a Slovak association football club located in Trenčianske Stankovce. It currently plays in Majstrovstvá regiónu Západ west. The club currently plays in the 4. Liga.

== History ==
In the 4th round of the 2025–26 Slovak Cup, Trenčianske Stankovce drew Slovak reigning champions ŠK Slovan Bratislava.

== Colors and badge ==
Its colors are yellow and black.
