= MŠK Spišské Podhradie =

Slovak football club

- Full name: MŠK Spišské Podhradie
- Ground: Štadión Spišské Podhradie, Spišské Podhradie
- Chairman: Jozef Komara
- Manager: Branislav Minďaš
- League: 4. liga
- 2025-26: 14th (relegated)

MŠK Spišské Podhradie is a Slovak football team, based in the town of Spišské Podhradie. The club it plays in 3. liga (3rd level).

== History ==
In the 2025–26 Slovak Cup, Spišské Podhradie were drawn with Slovak First Football League side FC Košice, losing the game 7–1.
