= SFC Kalinkovo =

Slovak football club

- Full name: SFC Kalinkovo
- Founded: 1970; 56 years ago
- Ground: Futbalový štadión SFC Kalinkovo, Kalinkovo
- Capacity: 1,000
- Head coach: Samuel Füzik
- League: 4. Liga
- 2025–26: 4. liga Bratislava (promoted)
- Website: http://www.sfckalinkovo.com/club

SFC Kalinkovo is a Slovak football team, based in the town of Kalinkovo. Club colours are blue and yellow.
