= MFK Rusovce =

Slovak football club

- Full name: MFK Rusovce
- Founded: 1995
- Ground: MFK Rusovce Stadium, Rusovce
- Capacity: 400 (100 seats)
- President: Peter Golej
- Head coach: Michal Salenka
- League: 3. Liga
- 2017–18: 2nd (4. liga Bratislava) (promoted)
- Website: http://www.mfkrusovce.szm.com/

MFK Rusovce is a Slovak football team, based in the town of Rusovce. The club colours are green and yellow.
