= RSC Hamsik Academy =

Slovak football club

- Full name: Rakytovce Sporting Club Hamsik Academy
- Founded: 1993
- Dissolved: 2025
- Ground: Stadium Rakytovce, Rakytovce, Slovakia
- Capacity: 1,500
- Head coach: Denis Tomáškovič
- League: 3. Liga
- 2020–2021: 2nd in 3. Liga
- Website: http://fk-rakytovce.webnode.sk/

RSC Hamsik Academy was a Slovak association football club located in Rakytovce. It lastly played in 3. liga (3rd tier in Slovak football system). The club was founded in 1993. It dissolved in 2025, with the junior players moving to MFK Dukla Banská Bystrica, and with Hamšík himself taking on the role of U15 team coach at that club.

== Former names ==
- 1986 – TJ STS Rakytovce
- 1992 – ŠK Kvasna Rakytovce
- 1995 – ŠK Stapex Rakytovce
- 1997 – FK Rakytovce 85
- 2009 – MFK Banská Bystrica
- 2013 – FK Rakytovce
- 2022 – Merged with JUPIE Futbalová škola Mareka Hamšíka to RSC Hamsik Academy

== Colors and badge ==
Its colors were blue and white.
