= ŠK Nová Dedinka =

Slovak football club

- Full name: Športový Klub Nová Dedinka
- Founded: 1933
- Ground: Futbalové ihrisko ŠK Nová Dedinka, Nová Dedinka
- Capacity: 1,000
- Chairman: Attila Poór
- Head coach: Štefan Bódiš
- League: 3. liga
- 2020–21: 4. liga BFZ, 1st (promoted)

ŠK Nová Dedinka is a Slovak football team, based in the town of Nová Dedinka. The club was founded in 1933. Club colors are blue and white. ŠK Nová Dedinka home stadium is Futbalové ihrisko ŠK Nová Dedinka with a capacity of 1,000 spectators.

== Current squad ==
Note: Flags indicate national team as defined under FIFA eligibility rules; some limited exceptions apply. Players may hold more than one non-FIFA nationality.

No. / Pos. / Nation / Player	No. / Pos. / Nation / Player

== Staff ==
=== Current technical staff ===
|- | (Slovakia) Štefan Bódiš | Head coach |- | (Slovakia) Attila Poór | Club official

== Club officials ==
Attila Poór is a Slovak football official and club representative of FK Nová Dedinka. He has been involved in the club's management and coordination for several years. Known for his dedication to regional football development, Poór plays a key role in supporting the team and organizing activities around the club. He is a respected figure in the football community of Nová Dedinka.

== Historical names ==
- ŠK Nová Dedinka (?–present)
