= MŠK Senec =

Slovak football club

- Full name: Mládežnícky športový klub Senec
- Founded: 2014; 12 years ago
- Ground: NTC Senec, Senec, Slovakia
- Capacity: 3.264 (seats)
- Head coach: Štefan Horný
- League: 3. liga
- 2025-26: 8th place

MŠK Senec is a Slovak association football club located in Senec. It currently plays in 3. liga, which is the third tier in Slovak football system. The club was founded in 2014 and was run only as a youth club until summer 2016, subsequently the senior team of the club was established and begun in 6. liga. The senior team now plays the 3rd highest football competition in Slovakia.
