= TJ Jednota Bánová =

Slovak football club

- Full name: TJ Jednota Bánová
- Founded: 1929
- Ground: Štadión TJ Jednota Bánová, Bánová, Žilina
- Capacity: 570
- Chairman: Jozef Kobera
- Manager: Michal Šajnoha
- League: 3. liga
- 2025–26: 14th relegated

TJ Jednota Bánová is a Slovak football team, based in Bánová a quarter of the city of Žilina. The club was founded in 1929.
