= ŠK Tomášov =

Slovak football club

- Full name: ŠK Tomášov
- Founded: 1930
- Ground: Stadium ŠK Tomášov, Tomášov, Slovakia
- Capacity: 1,500 (140 seats)
- Chairman: Alexander Nagy
- Head coach: Maroš Jakim
- League: 3. Liga
- 2013–2014: 1st (promoted)
- Website: http://www.sktomasov.sk/

ŠK Tomášov is a Slovak association football club located in Tomášov. It currently plays in 3. liga (3rd tier in Slovak football system). The club was founded in 1930.

== Colors and badge ==
Its colors are green and white.
