= FTC Fiľakovo =

Slovak football club

- Full name: FTC Fiľakovo
- Founded: 1908; 118 years ago
- Ground: Štadión FTC Fiľakovo, Fiľakovo
- Capacity: 3,000
- Chairman: Attila Višnyai
- Manager: Miroslav Kéry
- League: 3. liga
- 2025–26: 5th

FTC Fiľakovo is a Slovak football team, based in the town of Fiľakovo. The club was founded in 1908.

== Historical names ==
- 1908 – Füleki Haladás ATC (Füleki Haladás Atlétikai Torna Club)
- 1912 – Füleki AC (Füleki Atlétikai Club)
- 1914 – Füleki FC (Füleki Football Club)
- 1920 – Füleki TC (Füleki Torna Club)
- 1940 – Füleki VKSE (Füleki Vasutas Kultúr Sport Egyesület)
- 1943 – Füleki Vasutas SC (Füleki Vasutas Sport Club)
- 1945 – ŠK Závody Fiľakovo (Športový klub Závody Fiľakovo)
- 1949 – TJ Sokol Kovosmalt Fiľakovo (Telovýchovná jednota Sokol Kovosmalt Fiľakovo)
- 1950 – ZŠJ Fiľakovo (Základná športová jednota Fiľakovo)
- 1951 – DŠO Kovosmalt Fiľakovo (Dobrovolná športová organizacía Kovosmalt Fiľakovo)
- 1953 – TJ Spartak Fiľakovo (Telovýchovná jednota Spartak Fiľakovo)
- 1960 – TJ Kovomier Fiľakovo (Telovýchovná jednota Kovomier Fiľakovo)
- 1992 – TJ FTC Fiľakovo (Telovýchovná jednota FTC Fiľakovo)
- 1993 – FTC Fiľakovo
