= TJ Baník Kalinovo =

Slovak football club

- Full name: TJ Baník Kalinovo
- Ground: Stadium TJ Baník Kalinovo, Kalinovo
- Capacity: 1,200
- Chairman: Zsolt Horváth
- Head coach: Matej Čobik Ferčik
- League: 3. liga
- 2025–26: 10th

TJ Baník Kalinovo is a Slovak football team, based in the village of Kalinovo. It currently plays in the 3. liga, the third tier of Slovak football.

== Colors and badge ==
Its colors are green and white or red-blue.
