= MFK Rožňava =

Slovak football club

- Full name: MFK Rožňava
- Founded: 1918
- Ground: MFK Rožňava Stadium, Rožňava
- Capacity: 1,500
- President: Michal Domik
- Head coach: Peter Štyvár
- League: 5. Liga Košicko-gemerská
- 2019–20: 10th (of 14)
- Website: http://www.mfkroznava.com/

MFK Rožňava is a Slovak football team, based in the town of Rožňava.

== Colours ==
Club colours are yellow and blue.
