= TJ Tatran Krásno nad Kysucou =

Slovak football club

- Full name: TJ Tatran Krásno nad Kysucou
- Founded: 1925
- Ground: Stadium Tatran Krásno nad Kysucou, Krásno nad Kysucou
- Capacity: 4,500
- Chairman: Milan Hacek
- Head coach: Štefan Tománek
- League: 3. liga
- 2018/2019: 12th
- Website: http://www.tatrankrasno.sk/

TJ Tatran Krásno nad Kysucou is a Slovak football team, based in the town of Krásno nad Kysucou. The club was founded in 1925.
