= FK Podkonice =

Slovak football club

- Full name: Futbalový Klub Podkonice
- Founded: 1959
- Ground: Štadión na Brodku, Podkonice
- Capacity: 800
- President: Michal Barla
- Head coach: Peter Venglarčík
- League: 3. liga
- 2025–26: 9th

FK Podkonice is a Slovak football team, based in the village of Podkonice. The club was founded in 1959. Club colors are blue and white. FK Podkonice home stadium is Štadión na Brodku with a capacity of 800 spectators.

== History ==
The modern history of Podkonice football began on June 15, 1959. At a meeting of TJ Tatran Podkonice, a proposal was adopted to take a new path in this sport. The Physical Education Unit entered the team into the competition and the boys could represent their own village. The team was placed in the 4. Liga of the Banská Bystrica District.

The first home match took place on August 15, 1959. They drew 3:3 with the Selce "B" team, and it was with this result that the history of organized football in Podkonice began.

The football club FK Podkonice currently operates in the 3rd league - West. It is the highest competition that the football players in Podkonice have played in.

On 14 August 2019, FK Podkonice faced a top-flight club for the first time in their history, hosting DAC Dunajská Streda in the Slovak Cup. The match was attended by 983 spectators and ended in a 4–0 victory for DAC.

In subsequent editions of the Slovak Cup, Podkonice hosted several other top-flight clubs: FC ViOn Zlaté Moravce (1–4) in 2020, FK Dukla Banská Bystrica (0–3) in 2023, MFK Ružomberok (2–3) in 2024, and FK Železiarne Podbrezová (1–3) in 2025.
