= TJ Družstevník Veľké Ludince =

Slovak football club

- Full name: TJ Družstevník Veľké Ludince
- Ground: Štadión TJ Družstevník Veľké Ludince, Veľké Ludince
- Capacity: 800
- Chairman: František Vígh
- Manager: Milan Pavlovič
- League: 3. liga
- 2025-26: 10th

TJ Družstevník Veľké Ludince is a Slovak football team, based in the village of Veľké Ludince.

== History ==
Since 1988, the club gradually worked its way up from the lowest district competition to the lowest regional competition, after which they had never gotten relegated from. Veľké Ludince have played in the 3. Liga for over 20 seasons. The club is the smallest village to play in the 3. Liga.

In 2024, Veľké Ludince played against DAC Dunajská Streda in front of 2,000 spectators in the Slovnaft Cup, to whom they lost 3–0.

In 2016, the club was drawn against Slovan Bratislava in the Slovak Cup. Slovan would win the game 1–0 in front of 3,000 spectators.
