= OFK Baník Lehota pod Vtáčnikom =

Slovak football club

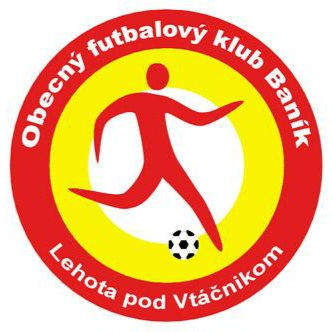
- Full name: Obecný futbalový klub Baník Lehota pod Vtáčnikom
- Ground: Futbalový štadión OFK Baník Lehota pod Vtáčnikom, Lehota pod Vtáčnikom
- Capacity: 800
- Head coach: Dušan Oravec
- League: 2. Liga
- 2025–26: 11th
Home colours	Away colours

OFK Baník Lehota pod Vtáčnikom is a Slovak football team, based in the village of Lehota pod Vtáčnikom, that will compete in the 2. Liga, the 2nd tier of Slovak football, after beating MFK Snina via play-off on 7 June 2025.

== Colours ==
Club colours are white, red and yellow.

== Rivalry ==
Baník´s biggest rival is currently FC Baník Prievidza, neightboring town from 4th tier. This derby is also called as "Banícke derby".

== Current squad ==
As of 22 July 2026

Note: Flags indicate national team as defined under FIFA eligibility rules; some limited exceptions apply. Players may hold more than one non-FIFA nationality.

No.	Pos.	Nation	Player
4	MF	SVK	Adam Pavelka
5	DF	SVK	Robert Starecek
6	DF	SVK	Vladimir Kovac
8	MF	NGR	Lekan Okunola
10	MF	ZIM	Mbekelezi Sibanda (captain)
12	FW	ENG	Nicholas Dmitrovic
13	DF	SVK	Mario Šimorka
14	FW	FRA	Daouda Ouattara
15	DF	SVK	Richard Benko
15	DF	SVK	Adam Knaze
17	FW	SVK	Adam Horvat

No.	Pos.	Nation	Player
23	DF	SVK	Marko Bachna (on loan from FK Pohronie)
25	MF	SVK	Marian Smatlak
26	FW	SVK	Adam Jackuliak
28	MF	SVK	Samuel Hodur
30	DF	SVK	David Ovsonka
44	GK	SVK	Peter Znamenak
55	GK	SVK	Michal Kovacik
—	DF	UKR	Andriy Cheprakov
—	MF	GAM	Yusupha Kambi
—	FW	SVK	Markus Sevce
—	DF	SVK	Nicolas Sagan (on loan from FC Petržalka)

For recent transfers, see List of Slovak football transfers summer 2025.
