= 4. Liga (Slovakia) =

4. liga
- Founded: 1993
- Country: Slovakia
- Confederation: UEFA
- Leagues: 4
- Number of clubs: 61
- Level on pyramid: 4
- Promotion to: 3. liga
- Relegation to: 5. liga
- Domestic cup: Slovak Cup
- Current: 2026-27

4. liga (4th league) is a shared name for all fourth-tier football leagues in Slovakia. The name currently belongs to 4 leagues, all are run by their respective regional football associations (FAs). The leagues' names also contain the abbreviation of the regional FA they are run by, the term Majstrovstvo/Majstrovstvá regiónu at the beginning and potentially a name of a sponsor. The name is currently used by 4 leagues that consist of the total of 61 teams.

== 2025–26 season participants ==
Bratislava	West	Middle	East
FC Rohožník	ŠKF Sereď	FK Čadca	Partizán Bardejov
FC Slovan Modra	FC Pata	FK Slávia Staškov	MFK Rožňava
FK Lokomotíva Devínska Nová Ves	PFK Piešťany	TJ Spartak Radôstka	FC Pivovar Šariš Veľký Šariš
FK Slovan Ivanka pri Dunaji	FK Slovan Levice	OŠK Baník Stráňavy	FK Čaňa
MŠK Kráľová pri Senci	Spartak Dubnica	OŠK Bešeňová	FK Gerlachov
MFK Rusovce	AFC Nové Mesto nad Váhom	ŠK Badín	FK Kechnec
FKM Karlova Ves Bratislava	ŠK Šoporňa	ŠK Javorník Makov	ŠK Záhradné
NŠK 1922 Bratislava	OFK Trebatice	ŠK Prameň Kováčová	FK Sobrance-Sobranecko
OFK Dunajská Lužná	OŠK Trenčianske Stankovce	TJ Partizán Osrblie	FK Slovan Kendice
PŠC Pezinok	ŠK LR CRYSTAL	OŠK Rosina	FK Geča 73
SFC Kalinkovo	TJ Imeľ	FK FILJO Ladomerská Vieska	MŠK Spartak Medzilaborce
ŠK Bernolákovo	FC Nitra	TJ Sokol Medzibrod	TJ Sokol Ľubotice
ŠK Nová Dedinka	ŠK Blava 1928	TJ Sokol Zubrohlava	OŠK Pavlovce nad Uhom
ŠK Tomášov	FK Bestrent Horná Krupá	TJ Tatran Krásno nad Kysucou	OŠK Rudňany
TJ Záhoran Jakubov	TJ Nafta Gbely		
TJ Rovinka	TJ Slavoj Boleráz		

== Name ==
Period	Name
1993–2006	4. liga
2006–2011	3. liga (Note: Due to changes in the naming system.)
2011–present	4. liga

== Champions ==
Season	Bratislava	West	Center	East
2022–23	TJ Rovinka	OFK Baník Lehota pod Vtáčnikom	MFK Zvolen	Redfox FC Stará Ľubovňa
2023–24	Not held			
2024–25	Spartak Medzev	Baník Prievidza	MFK Bytča	MŠK Senec
