= 3. Liga (Slovakia) =

Third highest football league in Slovakia

3. liga
- Logo used as of 2025
- Organising body: Slovak Football Association
- Founded: 1993
- Country: Slovakia
- Confederation: UEFA
- Groups: 3
- Number of clubs: 44
- Level on pyramid: 3
- Promotion to: 2. liga
- Relegation to: 4. liga
- Domestic cup: Slovak Cup
- Website: sportnet.sme.sk/futbalnet (in Slovak)
- Current: 2026–27 3. Liga

The 3. Liga (known as TIPOS III. Liga due to sponsorship reasons) is the third-tier football league in Slovakia, established in 1993. As of the 2025–26 season, it comprises 44 teams divided into three geographical groups: 3. liga Západ (West), 3. Liga Stred (Central), and 3. liga Východ (East). The league operates under the jurisdiction of the Slovak Football Association and serves as a feeder league to the 2. Liga, with top-performing teams earning promotion. Conversely, teams finishing at the bottom face relegation to the 4. Liga. The league also provides teams the opportunity to compete in the national Slovak Cup.

== Clubs ==
The league consists of three groups: West, Central, and East. The list of participants in the 2025–26 season:

=== West ===
- AS Trenčín B
- Spartak Myjava
- FC Slovan Galanta
- FC Baník Prievidza
- FKM Nové Zámky
- OK Častkovce
- ŠK 1923 Gabčíkovo
- MŠK Senec
- FK Beluša
- FK DAC 1904 Dunajská Streda B
- TJ Družstevník Veľké Ludince
- FK Slovan Duslo Šaľa
- FK Rača
- FC - Žolík Malacky
- KFC Komárno B
- FC Petržalka B

=== Middle ===
- MŠK Námestovo
- MFK Dukla Banská Bystrica B
- FTC Fiľakovo
- MFK Bytča
- FK Podkonice
- MŠK Rimavská Sobota
- MFK Ružomberok B
- MŠK Fomat Martin
- TJ Tatran Oravské Veselé
- TJ Baník Kalinovo
- MŠK Kysucké Nové Mesto
- MFK Dolný Kubín
- TJ Jednota Bánová

=== East ===
- FK Spišská Nová Ves
- FK Humenné
- MŠK Tesla Stropkov
- OFK - SIM Raslavice
- ŠK Odeva Lipany
- MFK Spartak Medzev
- MFK Snina
- FC Košice B
- 1. MFK Kežmarok
- MFK Vranov nad Topľou
- FK Poprad
- MFK Slovan Sabinov
- FC Lokomotíva Košice
- MŠK Spišské Podhradie

== Sponsorship ==
Period	Sponsor	Name
1993–2006	No main sponsor	3. liga
2006–2011	No main sponsor	2. liga
2011–2012	No main sponsor	3. liga
2012–2013	Tipos	Keno 10 3. liga
2013–?	Tipos	TIPOS III.liga
?–2025	No main sponsor	3. liga
2025–present	Tipos	TIPOS III. Liga

== See also ==
- List of football clubs in Slovakia
