= List of ŠK Slovan Bratislava managers =

This List of ŠK Slovan Bratislava managers is about association football sport in Slovakia, for ŠK Slovan Bratislava club.

== Manager history ==
Name	Nationality	Years
József Braun	Hungary	1934–37
Pál Jakube	Hungary	1937–38
József Braun	Hungary	1938
Otto Mazal	Czech Republic	1939
František Lanák	Slovakia	1939
Kajmo Muller	Slovakia	1939–40
Vinzenz Dittrich	Germany	1941
Ferdinand Daučík	Slovakia	1942–46
Tom Sneddon	Scotland	1947–48
Ferdinand Daučík	Slovakia	1948
Leopold Šťastný	Slovakia	1949–51
Karol Bučko	Slovakia	1951–52
Anton Bulla	Slovakia	1953
Leopold Šťastný	Slovakia	1954–57
Jozef Baláži	Slovakia	1958
Štefan Jačiansky	Slovakia	1958
József Ember	Hungary	1959
Štefan Jačiansky	Slovakia	1960
Ivan Chodák	Slovakia	1960
Ján Greššo	Slovakia	1960–61
Anton Bulla	Slovakia	1961
Karol Borhy	Slovakia	1961–62
Anton Bulla	Slovakia	1962–63
Leopold Šťastný	Slovakia	1963–65
Vojtech Skyva	Slovakia	1965
Jozef Čurgaly	Slovakia	1966
Ján Hucko	Slovakia	1966–68
Michal Vičan	Slovakia	1968–71
Ján Hucko	Slovakia	1971–73
Jozef Vengloš	Slovakia	1973–76

Name	Nationality	Years
Michal Vičan	Slovakia	1976
Jozef Vengloš	Slovakia	1977–78
Ivan Hrdlička	Slovakia	1978
Anton Malatinský	Slovakia	1978–81
Anton Urban	Slovakia	1981
Michal Vičan	Slovakia	1982–83
Karol Pecze	Slovakia	1983–84
Ján Hucko	Slovakia	1984
Valér Švec	Slovakia	1985–86
Ján Zachar	Slovakia	1986–88
Jozef Jankech	Slovakia	1988–90
Dušan Galis	Slovakia	1990–95
Anton Dragúň	Slovakia	1995
Karol Jokl	Slovakia	1995
Dušan Galis	Slovakia	1996–97
Ján Švehlík	Slovakia	1997
Jozef Prochotský	Slovakia	1997–98
Ján Švehlík	Slovakia	1998
Stanislav Griga	Slovakia	1998–99
Stanislav Jarábek	Slovakia	1999–01
Anton Dragúň	Slovakia	2001
Alexander Vencel	Slovakia	2001
Jozef Prochotský	Slovakia	2001
Miroslav Svoboda	Slovakia	2001
Ján Švehlík	Slovakia	2002
Miroslav Svoboda	Slovakia	2002
Dušan Radolský	Slovakia	2002–03
Jozef Valovič	Slovakia	2003
Oleh Taran	Ukraine	2003
Libor Fašiang	Slovakia	2003

Name	Nationality	Years
Jozef Adamec	Slovakia	October 12, 2003–June 30, 2004
Vladimír Goffa	Slovakia	2004
Štefan Zaťko	Slovakia	2004–05
Jozef Jankech	Slovakia	2005–07
Boris Kitka	Slovakia	June 1, 2007–March 31, 2008
Ladislav Pecko	Slovakia	April 1, 2008–June 30, 2009
Dušan Uhrin	Czech Republic	July 20, 2009–August 24, 2009
Michal Hipp	Slovakia	August 26, 2009
Dušan Tittel	Slovakia	2010
Jozef Jankech	Slovakia	July 1, 2010–November 8, 2010
Karel Jarolím	Czech Republic	November 8, 2010–August 4, 2011
Vladimír Weiss	Slovakia	August 5, 2011–August 3, 2012
Samuel Slovák	Slovakia	August 3, 2012–July 28, 2013
Dušan Galis	Slovakia	July 28, 2013–June 11, 2014
František Straka	Czech Republic	June 11, 2014–October 7, 2014
Jozef Chovanec	Slovakia	October 16, 2014–April 6, 2015
Dušan Tittel	Slovakia	April 8, 2015–August 21, 2015
Nikodimos Papavasiliou	Cyprus	August 21, 2015–July 31, 2016
Vladimír Koník (interim)	Slovakia	July 31, 2016–August 18, 2016
Ivan Vukomanović	Serbia	August 18, 2016–October 30, 2017
Martin Ševela	Slovakia	October 30, 2017–July 18, 2019
Vladimir Radenkovič (interim)	Serbia	July 19, 2019–July 24, 2019
Ján Kozák jr.	Slovakia	July 25, 2019–September 4, 2020
Darko Milanič	Slovenia	September 7, 2020–May 9, 2021
Vladimír Weiss	Slovakia	May 11, 2021–May 16, 2026
Yaya Touré	Ivory Coast	June 13, 2026 – present
