= Hrnčár =

Hrnčár is a surname. Notable people with the surname include:

- David Hrnčár (born 1997), Slovak footballer, son of Norbert
- Eduard Hrnčár (born 1978), Slovak footballer
- Norbert Hrnčár (born 1970), Slovak footballer and manager
