= FC Nitra =

Slovak football club

- Full name: Football Club Nitra
- Nickname: Trogári
- Founded: 1909; 117 years ago
- Ground: Štadión pod Zoborom, Nitra
- Capacity: 7,246
- Owner: FC Nitra a. s.
- Chairman: Radoslav Bratko
- Manager: Andrej Štefanka
- League: 3. Liga
- 2025–26: 4. liga, 1st of 16 (promoted)
- Website: https://fcnitra.sk/
Home colours	Away colours	Third colours

FC Nitra is a Slovak association football club, based in the city of Nitra. Established in 1909, FC Nitra is one of the oldest football clubs in Slovakia. The club plays its home matches at Štadión pod Zoborom.

FC Nitra is one of Slovakia's traditional football clubs. From the 1955 season, the club alternated between the top tier of the Czechoslovak football league system and the Czechoslovak Second League. Its best finish in the Czechoslovak First League came in the 1961–62 season, when it finished as runners-up. On 1 January 1991, FC Nitra became the first fully professional football club in Czechoslovakia.

Following the dissolution of Czechoslovakia, FC Nitra became one of the founding members of the Slovak First Football League. The club subsequently alternated between the Slovak top division and the second tier until the 2020–21 season. Due to financial difficulties, FC Nitra were relegated from the top flight and subsequently failed to obtain a licence for the second-tier competition, resulting in their administrative demotion to the 3. Liga. After one season, the club was relegated again to the 4. Liga. The club stabilized ahead of the 2024–25 season, and in the 2025–26 season FC Nitra won the 4. Liga and earned promotion to the 3. Liga.

FC Nitra's traditional club colours are blue and white. The club's crest features the silhouette of Nitra Castle. Its main rivals are FC Spartak Trnava and ŠK Slovan Bratislava, while its principal regional rival is FC ViOn Zlaté Moravce. In 2013, the club established a women's section, which entered the league system in the 2014–15 season.

== History ==
=== Early years (1909-1954) ===
In 1868, a sports club called the Fencing and Physical Education Association was founded in the city of Nitra by Július Gisser. In 1909, Július Gisser's son, Augustín Gisser, established a football section within the already restructured sports club, which by then was known as the Nitra Fencing and Physical Education Association (Hungarian: Nyitrai Torna és Vívó Egylet), abbreviated as Nyitrai TVE. Around the same time, the city's firefighters, led by Oskar Ronchetti, founded the Nitra Volunteer Firefighters' Association (Hungarian: Nyitrai Önkéntes Tűzoltó Testület Sportosztálya), abbreviated as Nyitrai ÖTTSO. The first opponents of the two football teams were mainly clubs from nearby towns and cities, as well as teams from Vienna and Budapest. During the First World War, both clubs curtailed their sporting activities. After the war, members of the two clubs formed a new club called the Nitra Sports Club (Hungarian: Nyitrai Sport Club), abbreviated as Nyitrai SC. In 1921, the club adopted its first Slovak name, Sport Club Nitra (Slovak: Športový klub Nitra), commonly abbreviated as ŠK Nitra. The club subsequently competed in an organised league within the Czechoslovak Football Association. However, other football clubs continued to exist in the city, largely reflecting its ethnic and religious divisions. It was not until 1923 that all of the city's clubs merged into a single organisation, forming Atletický club Nitra (Slovak: Atletický club Nitra), abbreviated as AC Nitra. The merger brought together residents of the city regardless of their nationality or religion.

The club's development was adversely affected by a fire in 1928, which destroyed all of the club's equipment, and by a flood in 1931, which again destroyed the club's property. In 1937, another flood destroyed the club's entire infrastructure. As a result of these events, during the 1930s the club competed only in a local Western Slovak league. In 1934, the Slovak–Subcarpathian Division was established, with AC Nitra being placed in its Western section. In the 1934–35 season that AC Nitra made its debut in the Slovak–Subcarpathian Division, which at the time was the second-highest level of football in Czechoslovakia. However, the club finished in last place and was relegated back to the regional league. The club also failed to gain promotion to the top division following the establishment of the Slovak State in 1939, when only Slovak clubs remained in the league system. In the 1939 season, AC Nitra competed in the promotion play-off for a place in the top tier of Slovak football. However, the club finished last in the six-team competition, earning only two points from a single victory. In 1944, the club withdrew from the league in protest against the refusal to register its new signing, Čestmír Vycpálek, who had joined the club from Slavia Prague.

Beginning with the 1945–46 season, the club competed in the Divízia, the second-highest level of football in Czechoslovakia, specifically in the Slovak Division. In its first season at that level, the club finished as runners-up, just two points behind the league winners, who were promoted to the Czechoslovak First League. In 1948, the second tier of Czechoslovak football was reorganised and renamed the Zemská súťaž (Regional League). The competition consisted of four groups, with the club competing in Group D alongside other Slovak teams. In 1948, the club was renamed Sokol Nitra. In 1949, it changed its name twice. It was first renamed ZSJ Sokol SZ Nitra, an abbreviation for Works Sports Association Sokol United Factories Nitra (Slovak: Závodná športová jednota Sokol Spojené závody Nitra). Later that year, the club was renamed Z. K. K. P. Nitra, which stood for Works Club of the Municipal Services of Nitra (Slovak: Závodný klub komunálnych podnikov Nitra). For the 1949 season, the second tier was renamed the Oblastná súťaž (Regional League). Although the club finished in mid-table, it was relegated to the third tier following another reorganisation of the Czechoslovak league system. The new third division retained the name Oblastná súťaž. From the 1951 season, the competition was split into several regional leagues, and the club was placed in the Krajská súťaž – Nitra (Nitra Regional League). In 1953, the club was renamed once again, this time to DŠO Slavoj Nitra, an abbreviation for Voluntary Sports Organisation Slavoj Nitra (Slovak: Dobrovoľná športová organizácia Slavoj Nitra), commonly referred to simply as Slavoj Nitra. In the 1954 season, the club secured promotion back to the second tier, where it competed from the 1955 season onwards. Between 1951 and 1955, a new stadium with concrete stands was constructed.

=== Promotion to the top tiers of Czechoslovak football (1955–1978) ===
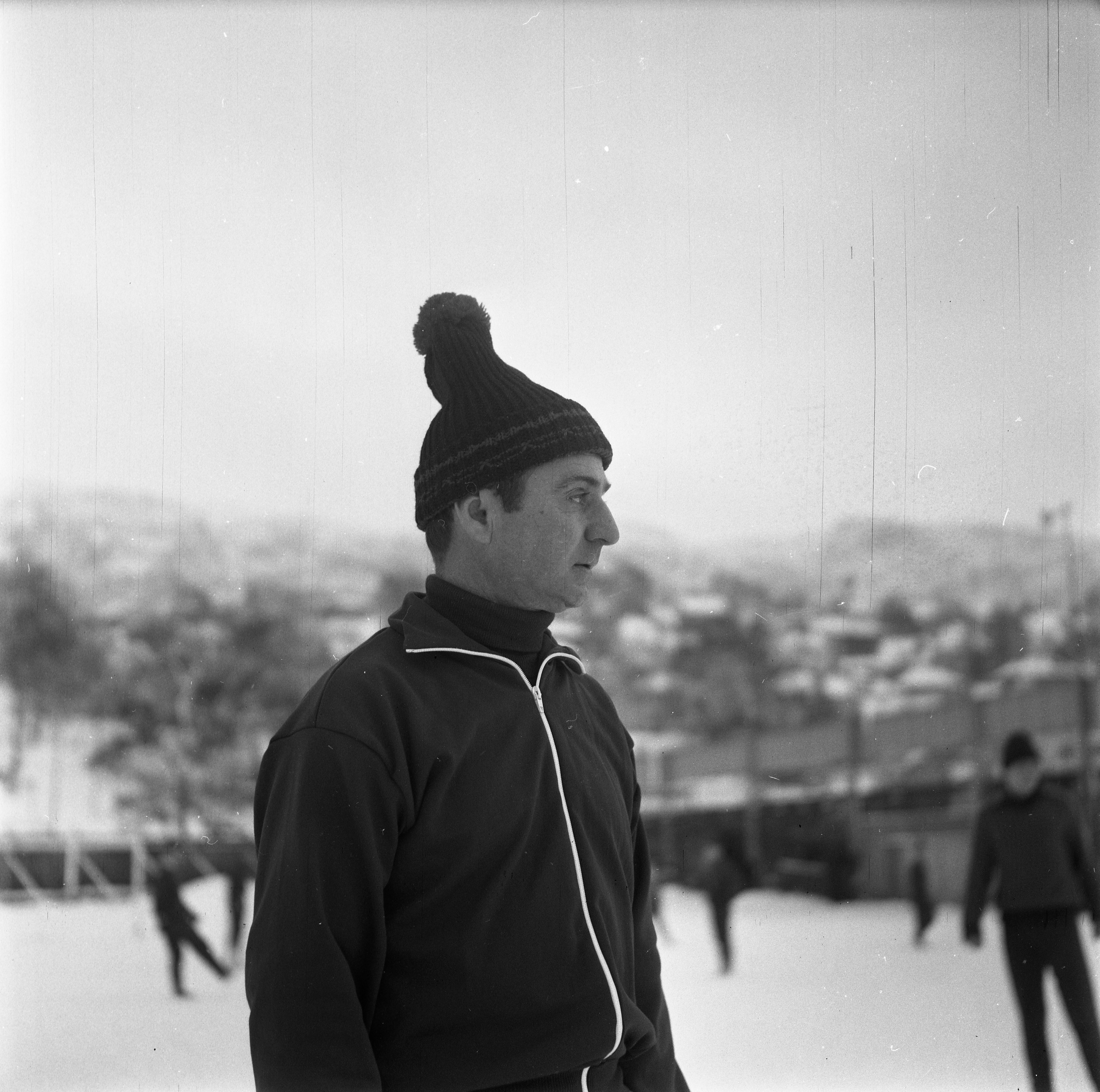
Karol Bučko managed the club during its first successful spell in the Czechoslovak First League and the Mitropa Cup.

Beginning with the 1955 season, Slavoj Nitra competed in Group B of the Czechoslovak Second League. In its debut season at that level, the club finished fourth, just five points behind the league leaders. Before the following season, the club was renamed TJ Slovan Nitra, short for Physical Education Union Slovan Nitra (Slovak: Telovýchovná jednota Slovan Nitra). The club recorded similar finishes over the following seasons, but in the 1958–59 season it won Group B and earned promotion to the Czechoslovak First League for the first time in its history. Slovan Nitra made its debut in the Czechoslovak First League in the 1959–60 season. The team was managed by Karol Bučko and included former Czechoslovakia internationals Anton Krásnohorský and Ladislav Putyera. Michal Pucher finished as the league's top scorer after scoring 18 goals in 25 matches. Slovan Nitra ended its debut top-flight season in eighth place. The club remained in the Czechoslovak First League over the following seasons and achieved its greatest success in the 1961–62 season, finishing as runners-up. Slovan Nitra finished just three points behind champions Dukla Prague. Michal Pucher scored 19 goals in 26 matches, finishing as the league's top scorer for the second time in three seasons.

The TJ Slovan Nitra team during the 1961–62 season. Top row, from left to right: Viliam Hrnčár, Ondrej Ištok, Vladimír Bachratý, Emil Kisý, Ladislav Putera, Michal Pucher. Bottom row, from left to right: Dušan Koník, Michal Kubačka, Ján Dinga, Milan Navrátil, Jozef Fojtík.

Slovan Nitra qualified for the 1961 Mitropa Cup, where it won Group 2. During the group stage, the club recorded a notable 5–1 victory over Torino. In the semi-finals, Slovan Nitra defeated Udinese 5–4 on aggregate to reach the final against Bologna. The first leg in Nitra ended in a 2–2 draw, but Slovan lost the return leg in Bologna 3–0, finishing as runners-up in the competition. However, the club endured a disappointing campaign the following season, finishing 12th and suffering relegation from the Czechoslovak First League. Slovan Nitra finished just one point behind the team occupying the last safe position. The club spent the next eight seasons in the Czechoslovak Second League before securing promotion back to the top flight after finishing as runners-up in the 1970–71 season. During its spell in the second tier, the club was renamed TJ AC Nitra in 1966, short for Physical Education Union Athletic Club Nitra (Slovak: Telovýchovná jednota Atletický club Nitra). The club competed under this name for the next ten years.

The club's return to the Czechoslovak First League sparked a football boom in Nitra. During the 1971–72 season, AC Nitra recorded an average attendance of 7,290 spectators, while the highest attendance reached 12,553. As a newly promoted side, the club finished 10th in the 16-team league. The team was managed that season by former club player and prolific goalscorer Michal Pucher. In 1972, the club won Group 1 of the Intertoto Cup, winning all six of its matches and in 1973, the club won Group 9 of the Intertoto Cup, winning five matches and drawing one. AC Nitra established itself as a mid-table side over the following seasons. However, after four seasons in the top flight, the club was relegated to the Czechoslovak Second League at the end of the 1974–75 season, alongside Sparta Prague. That season, the club reached the final of the Slovak Cup, where it lost to Spartak Trnava. By then, former club player Ján Dinga had replaced Michal Pucher as manager. AC Nitra returned to the Czechoslovak Second League for the 1975–76 season, finishing fourth. In 1976, the club was renamed TJ Plastika Nitra, short for Physical Education Union Plastika Nitra (Slovak: Telovýchovná jednota Plastika Nitra). Plastika was a chemical manufacturing company based in Nitra and became the club's principal sponsor. The club competed under this name until 1990. From the 1977–78 season, the Czechoslovak Second League was divided into two separate competitions: the Czech National Football League and the Slovak National Football League. Plastika Nitra continued to compete in the Slovak National Football League, the competition's official name. Despite its title, it was the second tier of Czechoslovak football. The club improved significantly that season and mounted a serious challenge for promotion, eventually finishing as runners-up.

=== The successful 1980s and the Ľubomír Moravčík era (1978–1993) ===
The following season, Plastika Nitra enjoyed a successful campaign, winning the league and securing promotion to the Czechoslovak First League. Plastika Nitra returned to the Czechoslovak First League for the 1979–80 season and, as a newly promoted side, finished in sixth place. The team was managed by former club player František Skyva and featured players such as Rastislav Vincúr, Stanislav Dominka, Peter Hodúr, Ivan Horn, Róbert Jež, Jozef Kollárik and Zoltán Molnár, as well as Czechoslovakia internationals Dušan Borko, Ján Hlavatý and Jozef Kukučka. The club recorded an average attendance of 8,220 spectators, with a season-high crowd of 13,270. In 1979, a new main stand was built on the western side of the stadium. In 1980, the club won Group 5 of the Intertoto Cup. During this period, the club began implementing a new philosophy of youth development. The project was led by Milan Lešický, who gradually built a successful youth academy that would later produce several talented academy graduates every season. The club was less successful the following season, finishing in 13th place. The club was subsequently strengthened by the arrivals of Peter Palúch, Peter Ančic, Jozef Czuczor and Kamil Chatrnúch, who improved the overall quality of the squad. As a result, Plastika Nitra finished fourth in the league. However, the club endured another disappointing campaign in the 1982–83 season, narrowly avoiding relegation. The club enjoyed greater success in the Slovak Cup, reaching the final, where it lost to Slovan Bratislava. During the season, the club introduced several young players into the first team, including Jaroslav Dekýš, Ľubomír Kollár and future Czechoslovakia and Slovakia international goalkeeper Ladislav Molnár.

The TJ Plastika Nitra team in the mid-1980s.

The club's poor performances continued in the 1983–84 season, as Plastika Nitra finished bottom of the league and was relegated to the Czechoslovak Second League. Despite the relegation, the club welcomed several talented young players, including Marián Süttö and, most notably, Ľubomír Moravčík, who would later become the greatest academy graduate in the club's history and one of Slovakia's finest footballers of the 1990s. Plastika Nitra competed in the Czechoslovak Second League again from the 1984–85 season. The club finished as runners-up that season, narrowly missing out on promotion back to the top flight. The team was managed by Stanislav Jarábek, who continued to build the squad around young talent, introducing several promising players, including Michal Hipp, who later became a Czechoslovakia and Slovakia international. The following season, Jozef Jarabinský was appointed as the club's new manager. Under his guidance, Plastika Nitra won the league by a comfortable margin and secured promotion back to the Czechoslovak First League. The squad was further strengthened by the arrivals of young players Ivan Ondruška and Milan Lednický. Following the season, Jozef Jarabinský left to join Sparta Prague and was succeeded as manager by Kamil Majerník. Plastika Nitra established itself as a mid-table side in the Czechoslovak First League over the following seasons. One of the club's best achievements during this period was reaching the Slovak Cup final for the third time in the 1986–87 season. However, Plastika Nitra was once again defeated, this time by DAC Dunajská Streda. During this period, additional young players, including Róbert Barborík and Marián Bochnovič, were integrated into the first team. Ahead of the 1988–89 season, Milan Lešický was appointed manager. Having previously coached many of the club's players at youth level, he successfully guided the team to the second-best league finish in the club's history, securing third place in the Czechoslovak First League. As a result, Plastika Nitra qualified for the UEFA Cup for the first time. The majority of the squad consisted of players developed through the club's youth academy.

Among the club's promising young talents during this period was future Slovakia international Samuel Slovák. However, before breaking into FC Nitra's first team, he transferred to Slovan Bratislava in 1989. Plastika Nitra finished sixth in the Czechoslovak First League in the 1989–90 season. The squad was strengthened by the arrival of young midfielder Miroslav Sovič, who later became a Slovakia international. The club also made its first appearance in European competition since 1961, facing German side 1. FC Köln in the first round of the UEFA Cup. Plastika Nitra lost 5–1 on aggregate and was eliminated in the opening round.

In 1990, the club adopted its current name, FC Nitra, short for Football Club Nitra (Slovak: Futbalový club Nitra). The name change was part of the club's transition to professionalism. FC Nitra became the first fully professional football club in Czechoslovakia. Following the fall of communism in Czechoslovakia, several members of the club's successful squad left to pursue opportunities abroad, as players were now free to transfer to foreign clubs. The team's key player, Ľubomír Moravčík, joined French side Saint-Étienne. They were replaced by another generation of promising young players, including Peter Gunda, Norbert Hrnčár, Ivan Hucko, Igor Klejch, Jozef Majoroš and Róbert Tomaschek. However, the new generation was unable to make an immediate impact, and FC Nitra finished second from bottom in the 1990–91 season, suffering relegation to the Slovak National Football League. During the season, Milan Lešický was replaced as manager by Karol Pecze. Despite its disappointing league campaign, the club reached the Slovak Cup final for the fourth time that season. However, it was once again defeated by Spartak Trnava, meaning it failed to win the trophy at the fourth attempt. FC Nitra spent only one season in the Slovak National Football League, winning the title and earning an immediate return to the Czechoslovak First League. The 1992–93 season proved to be the final season of Czechoslovak football, as Czechoslovakia dissolved on 1 January 1993 into its two successor states, the Czech Republic and Slovakia. FC Nitra finished 12th in the league and, from the following season, became a founding member of the newly established Slovak First League. During the season, the club also introduced several talented young players into the first team, including Igor Demo and Martin Prohászka.

=== The club since the establishment of Slovakia (1993–2015) ===
Following the establishment of the independent Slovak Republic in 1993, Slovakia also introduced its own national football league system. FC Nitra automatically became a member of the newly established Slovak First League. In the inaugural 1993–94 season, the club finished 11th, second from bottom, in the regular season and was placed in the relegation group. Despite finishing level on points with another team, FC Nitra ended the group at the bottom of the table due to an inferior head-to-head record and was relegated. FC Nitra spent only one season in the second tier, winning the league title and earning an immediate return to the top flight. However, the club also struggled in the 1995–96 season, finishing second from bottom in the league. Norbert Hrnčár was the club's top scorer that season with seven goals. The club's poor form continued in the 1996–97 season, as FC Nitra finished bottom of the league and was relegated once again. FC Nitra competed in the second tier during the 1997–98 season, winning the league title and earning promotion back to the Slovak First League after just one season. However, FC Nitra's stay in the Slovak First League was once again short-lived. The club spent two seasons in the top flight before being relegated again after the league was reduced from 16 to 10 teams following the 1999–2000 season. Despite finishing 13th, FC Nitra was relegated to the second tier as part of the restructuring. This time, the club remained in the second tier for five seasons. FC Nitra came close to securing promotion in its first season, finishing level on points with champions Dubnica nad Váhom. However, Dubnica won the title on the head-to-head tiebreaker, despite FC Nitra scoring 33 more goals over the course of the season. The squad included several future Slovakia internationals, including Mário Breška, Róbert Jež, Ivan Hodúr, Ján Mucha and Štefan Senecký. However, all of the club's key players left for other clubs following the season. It was not until the 2004–05 season that the club won the second-tier title and secured promotion back to the Slovak First League. The achievement came under the management of Ivan Galád.

The photograph shows the FC Nitra team during the 2007–08 season. Under Czech manager Pavel Hapal, the club finished third in the top division, its best league finish since the establishment of the independent Slovak league.

The 2005–06 season marked the club's most successful campaign in many years. FC Nitra finished fifth in the Slovak First League, earning qualification for the UEFA Intertoto Cup. In addition, Róbert Rák finished as the league's top scorer with 21 goals (together with Erik Jendrišek). In 2005, Miroslav Stoch, one of the club's most renowned academy graduates, began his professional career at FC Nitra. He joined Chelsea the following year. In the 2006–07 season, FC Nitra finished in the championship group after the regular season and eventually placed sixth in the Slovak First League. The club also competed in the UEFA Intertoto Cup, where it defeated Luxembourg side CS Grevenmacher 12–2 on aggregate in the first round. In the second round, FC Nitra faced Ukrainian club Dnipro Dnipropetrovsk but was eliminated after a 3–2 aggregate defeat. During the season, the club's leading goalscorer, Róbert Rák, left the club, while manager Ivan Galád was dismissed following the end of the season. The following season, Czech manager Pavel Hapal was appointed as the club's new manager. Under his leadership, FC Nitra finished third in the Slovak First League, achieving its best league finish since the Czechoslovak era. As a result, the club qualified once again for the UEFA Intertoto Cup. However, the club struggled again in the 2008–09 season, finishing second from bottom in the Slovak First League. In the UEFA Intertoto Cup, FC Nitra faced Azerbaijani side Neftchi Baku in the first round. The tie ended 3–3 on aggregate, but Neftchi advanced on the away goals rule. Ivan Galád returned as manager ahead of the 2009–10 season. Under his leadership, FC Nitra enjoyed another successful campaign, finishing fourth in the Slovak First League and qualifying for the UEFA Europa League. The club also saw the return of Róbert Rák, who once again finished as the league's top scorer after scoring 18 goals during the season. However, FC Nitra could only manage a mid-table finish in the 2010–11 season. In the first qualifying round of the UEFA Europa League, FC Nitra faced Hungarian side Győri ETO FC but was eliminated after a 5–3 aggregate defeat. Ivan Galád left his position as manager at the end of the first half of the season. Over the following seasons, FC Nitra remained a mid-table side in the Slovak First League. In the 2012–13 season, the club was deducted three points following an incident during a home match against Spartak Trnava, in which FC Nitra player Seydouba Soumah assaulted the referee. The incident from the previous season created uncertainty, as the owners regarded the sanctions imposed on FC Nitra as unjust and decided to withdraw from the club. The decision by key shareholders to leave the club in protest against the punishment had a negative impact on FC Nitra's financial stability in the following years. The resulting instability culminated in the 2013–14 season, when FC Nitra finished bottom of the Slovak First League and suffered relegation. Ahead of the 2014–15 season, the club appointed former player Michal Hipp as manager. However, FC Nitra failed to secure an immediate return to the Slovak First League, finishing fifth in the second tier. As a result, Hipp was dismissed at the end of the season.

=== Financial crisis, collapse and recovery (2015–present) ===
FC Nitra did not return to the Slovak First League until the 2016–17 season, when it secured promotion after finishing second in the second tier. The team had been managed by Ivan Galád since January 2017. The following season, FC Nitra returned to the Slovak First League. The club finished seventh after the regular season and was placed in the relegation group. Nitra went on to win the relegation group, thereby retaining seventh place in the final league standings. During this period, the team was captained by academy graduate and former Slovakia international Tomáš Kóňa. The club achieved a similar league finish in the following season. However, FC Nitra once again finished bottom of the Slovak First League in the 2019–20 season and was forced to contest the relegation play-off against FK Dubnica. The club won the tie and retained its place in the top flight. In the 2020–21 season, the financial difficulties that had plagued the club for several years became fully apparent. FC Nitra had accumulated wage arrears owed to its players, as well as debts relating to other operating expenses. Despite these problems, the club initially remained in mid-table. However, after the regular season, it was placed in the relegation group. FC Nitra struggled throughout the relegation group, finishing bottom of the table and suffering relegation as a result of its severe financial instability. Following the season, the club was also denied a licence to compete in the second tier due to its financial problems.

After being denied a licence to compete in the second tier, FC Nitra was automatically relegated to the third tier of Slovak football. It marked the club's lowest level in 67 years, dropping into what was effectively a semi-professional competition. The club also became embroiled in a dispute with the City of Nitra, which refused to allow it to play its home matches at the Štadión pod Zoborom. At the end of 2020, new investors from Banská Bystrica took over the club. However, they were unable to reverse its financial decline. The club's problems were further compounded by an unsuccessful takeover attempt by German investors. They brought several new players to FC Nitra, including former Slovakia international Erik Jendrišek. However, the club's debt continued to increase, and the investors eventually withdrew. FC Nitra therefore competed in the Western Group of the Slovak Third League during the 2021–22 season. However, the club's financial problems persisted, and it even struggled to fund travel to away matches. FC Nitra finished 16th in the league and was relegated to the fourth tier of Slovak football.

The club's financial crisis reached its peak in 2023, when the District Court in Nitra declared FC Nitra bankrupt. As a result, the club lost its licence to operate its youth academy, its lease agreement for the Štadión pod Zoborom was terminated, and it was withdrawn from the Slovak Fourth League, in which it was competing at the time. The club appeared destined to cease operations. However, the club's management appealed the ruling, and in November 2023 the Regional Court in Bratislava ruled in FC Nitra's favour, overturning the bankruptcy decision. As a result of the aforementioned problems, FC Nitra did not play a single competitive match during the 2023–24 season. However, following the Regional Court's ruling in the club's favour, FC Nitra was admitted to the Slovak Fourth League for the 2024–25 season, finishing 13th. In September 2024, the club was taken over by new owner Pavol Ondriš, co-owner of the Slovak mobile network operator SWAN, marking the beginning of FC Nitra's financial and sporting recovery. The new owner gradually settled the club's debts to public authorities, while repayment plans were agreed with former players to clear outstanding wage arrears. A further six investors subsequently joined the club, helping to stabilise its financial position and organisational structure. Following the club's stabilisation, the board set promotion back to the Slovak First League as its primary objective. Several academy graduates subsequently returned to FC Nitra, most notably Lukáš Štetina. FC Nitra entered the 2025–26 Slovak Fourth League season as the favourites for promotion, a status it justified by comfortably winning the league by a 13-point margin over the runners-up and securing promotion to the third tier of Slovak football. The squad was further strengthened by the return of former players Matúš Paukner and Filip Balaj. After an 18-year absence, another academy graduate, Miroslav Stoch, also returned to the club.

== Historical names ==
The club's history can be traced to two separate football clubs founded in Nitra in 1909: Nyitrai TVE and Nyitrai ÖTTSO. The two clubs were rivals until 1919, when their members joined forces to establish Nyitrai SC. The club subsequently underwent several name changes and organisational reorganisations:

- 1909 – founded as Nyitrai TVE (Nyitrai Torna és Vívó Egylet)
- 1909 – founded as Nyitrai ÖTTSO (Nyitrai Önkéntes Tűzoltó Testület Sportosztálya)
- 1919 – merged to form Nyitrai SC (Nyitrai Sport Club)
- 1921 – renamed ŠK Nitra (Športový klub Nitra)
- 1923 – renamed AC Nitra (Atletický club Nitra)
- 1948 – renamed Sokol Nitra
- 1949 – renamed ZŠJ Sokol SZ Nitra (Závodná športová jednota Sokol Spojené závody Nitra)
- 1949 – renamed Z. K. K. P. Nitra (Závodný klub komunálnych podnikov Nitra)
- 1953 – renamed DŠO Slavoj Nitra (Dobrovoľná športová organizácia Slavoj Nitra)
- 1956 – renamed TJ Slovan Nitra (Telovýchovná jednota Slovan Nitra)
- 1966 – renamed TJ AC Nitra (Telovýchovná jednota Atletický club Nitra)
- 1976 – renamed TJ Plastika Nitra (Telovýchovná jednota Plastika Nitra)
- 1990 – renamed FC Nitra (Futbalový club Nitra)

== Crest and colours ==
Coat of arms of Nitra.

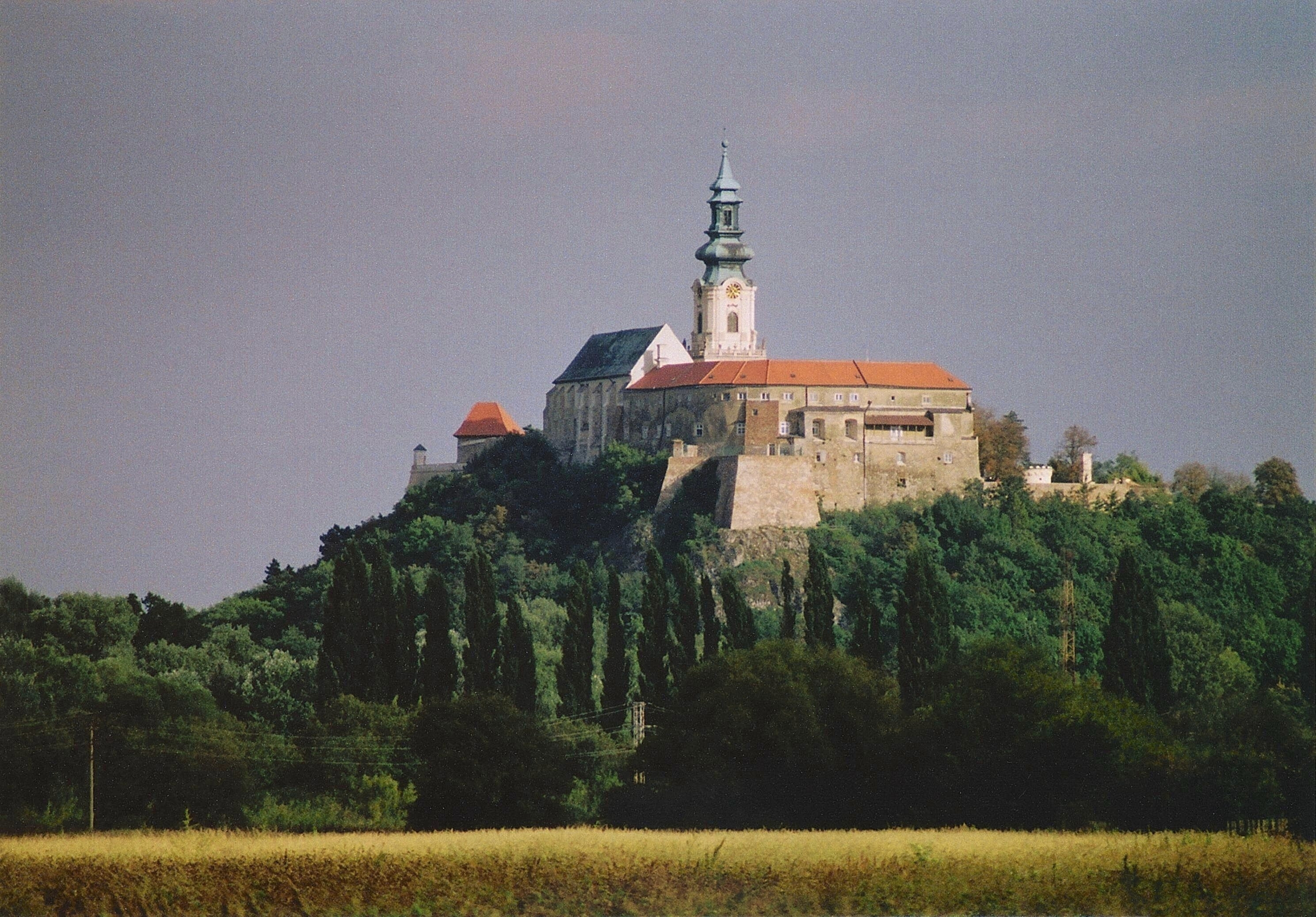
Photo of Nitra Castle

The club's crest is based on the coat of arms of the city of Nitra and the silhouette of Nitra Castle. The club's colours are blue and white, which are also the official colours of the city. The crest features the silhouette of Nitra Castle, the inscription FC Nitra, and a football. The club's colours are also reflected in the design of the crest. Before the adoption of the current version, the club used a diamond-shaped crest with an almost identical design. The only notable difference was the shade of blue, which was previously lighter.

Since its foundation, the club's crests have consistently incorporated symbols associated with the city of Nitra. The earliest versions featured the arm holding a flag from the city's coat of arms, while later designs adopted the silhouette of Nitra Castle. During the Austro-Hungarian period, the crest also included firefighting insignia, reflecting the club's origins within the Nitra Volunteer Fire Brigade. In later years, the crest changed regularly to reflect the club's various name changes, although its basic design remained largely unchanged. During the "TJ Plastika Nitra" era, the crest also incorporated the name and logo of the Plastika company, while retaining the silhouette of Nitra Castle. The club's nickname, "Trogári", is likewise derived from the traditional nickname of the inhabitants of Nitra.

The logo used during the 1980s.

The logo used in early 1990.

The club's kits have consistently retained the blue and white colours throughout its history. Only the shade of blue has changed over the years, ranging from sky blue to dark blue, while the kit designs have also varied between plain and striped patterns. The club currently (2026) wears blue-and-white striped shirts.

=== Kit manufacturers and shirt sponsors ===
Period	Kit manufacturer	Shirt sponsor
1998–2001	Erreà	Volkswagen
2001–2002	Gems	Pozemné Staviteľstvo Nitra
2002–2004	DIADORA	Pozemné Staviteľstvo Nitra
2004–2005	hummel	Bonul security
2005–2006	Jako	Dynamik
2006–2008	Jako	Bonul security
2008–2010	Jako	Bonul security El Comp
2010–13	Jako	Bonul security El Comp; Špeciál Izotex
2013–2016	Jako	Mesto Nitra
2017–2020	Jako	none
2020–2025	Adidas	none
2025	Nike	none
2026–	Nike	EUROGOLD

== Stadium ==
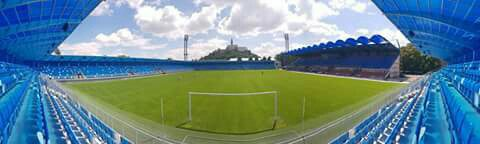
Štadión pod Zoborom following its most recent redevelopment. Nitra Castle is visible from the stadium stands.

FC Nitra has played its home matches at Štadión pod Zoborom since the club's foundation in 1909. The stadium has undergone several expansions and redevelopments over the years. The stadium assumed its current form following its most recent major reconstruction and redevelopment, which took place between January and September 2018.

Following the redevelopment, the stadium's capacity was initially planned to increase to 7,480 seats. However, upon completion, its final capacity was set at 7,246, with all spectator accommodation consisting of seated places. As part of the redevelopment, three of the original stands were completely demolished and replaced with new ones, while the main stand was extensively renovated and was the only original stand to be retained. A heated natural grass pitch was also installed. The redevelopment cost approximately €8 million. The stadium currently meets the requirements for UEFA Category 3. During the Czechoslovak era, the stadium had an original capacity of more than 10,000 spectators, although accommodation was provided entirely in the form of standing terraces. As the stadium was gradually modernised and an increasing number of seats were installed, its capacity was progressively reduced to 5,050. This remained the capacity of the old stadium until its reconstruction.

== Supporters ==
FC Nitra ultras during the match against Slovan Bratislava in 2026.

During its years in the Czechoslovak First League, FC Nitra regularly attracted average attendances of between 7,000 and 8,000 spectators. The club also recorded peak attendances of more than 12,000 spectators. The club's record home attendance was set on 11 August 1971, when 20,000 fans attended a home match against Slovan Bratislava. The club's largest away following was recorded on 11 May 1986, when more than 9,000 of its supporters travelled to Bratislava for an away match against Slovan Bratislava. During the 1980s, however, average attendances declined to around 5,000 spectators, while peak attendances were approximately 9,000. Following the establishment of Slovakia, average attendances declined even further, falling to approximately 2,500 spectators during the 1993–94 season. Average attendances remained at a similar level throughout the following years. During the club's spells in the second tier, average attendances fell to below 2,000 spectators. By the end of FC Nitra's spell in the Slovak top flight, at the turn of the 2010s and 2020s, average attendances had fallen to around 900 spectators, while the highest attendance was only 2,670. However, the club's attendance figures largely mirrored the overall trend in average attendances across the league. In the 2025–26 season, FC Nitra recorded an average attendance of 1,333 spectators despite competing in the fourth tier of Slovak football.

Since the 1990s, FC Nitra has maintained a relatively strong ultras scene. The group's membership was particularly large during the 1990s, when it was considered capable of rivaling the dominant supporter groups associated with Slovan Bratislava and Spartak Trnava. At that time, the group was known as "Bulldogs 95". However, as the club's on-field performances declined, both the group's membership and its activity at matches gradually decreased. The Bulldogs 95 name remains in use, although the group also operates under the names "Trogári 1909" and "Ultras Nitra". In the past, FC Nitra's ultras were involved in several clashes with supporter groups of Slovan Bratislava, Spartak Trnava and DAC Dunajská Streda. By contrast, they maintained friendly relations with the supporter groups of FC Košice and Sparta Prague. In the past, Ultras Nitra were associated with right-wing extremism. The club apologised for the incidents involving these supporters.

== Rivalries ==
The club's main rivals are Spartak Trnava and Slovan Bratislava. Matches against these clubs are regarded as traditional Slovak football derbies. In the past, matches against both clubs were occasionally accompanied by crowd disturbances and were classified as high-risk matches, requiring a significant police presence to ensure public safety. The club's principal regional rival is FC ViOn Zlaté Moravce.

In 2002, crowd violence following a match between Spartak Trnava and FC Nitra resulted in one supporter being seriously injured and several others sustaining minor injuries. In 2009, a match against Spartak Trnava was abandoned due to crowd disturbances caused by supporters. The match had to be replayed behind closed doors. In 2012, a match between FC Nitra and Spartak Trnava was marred by a mass confrontation involving players from both teams. FC Nitra player Seydouba Soumah was subsequently suspended for six months.

Similar incidents also accompanied matches against Slovan Bratislava. In 2018, clashes broke out between supporters of both clubs, while players and club officials from both teams also became involved in confrontations during the match and again after the final whistle. Although Slovan Bratislava is considered FC Nitra's biggest rival, their matches have seen fewer incidents than FC Nitra's matches against Spartak Trnava.

== Players ==
=== First-team squad ===
As of 1 October 2026

Note: Flags indicate national team as defined under FIFA eligibility rules; some limited exceptions apply. Players may hold more than one non-FIFA nationality.

No.	Pos.	Nation	Player
2	DF	SVK	Adam Kopas
3	DF	SVK	Dominik Straňák
4	DF	GHA	Kojo Amankwaa
6	MF	SVK	Adam Šútor
8	DF	SVK	Lukáš Štetina (captain)
9	MF	SVK	Miroslav Stoch
10	FW	SVK	Matúš Paukner (vice-captain)
11	FW	SVK	Tomáš Hambálek
16	DF	SVK	Denis Pánsky
18	MF	SVK	Michal Klec
19	MF	SVK	Karol Mondek

No.	Pos.	Nation	Player
21	MF	SVK	Alex Bucheň
22	DF	SVK	Andrej Kadlec
23	FW	NGR	Abdullahi Aliyu Adam
25	MF	SVK	Lukáš Štrauch
31	GK	SVK	Gregor Tóth
34	DF	SVK	Lukáš Greššák
45	FW	SVK	Filip Balaj
91	GK	SVK	Pavol Bajza
97	DF	SVK	Patrik Šurnovský
—	MF	SVK	Ondrej Vrábel
—	MF	SVK	Róbert Pich

=== Out on loan ===
Note: Flags indicate national team as defined under FIFA eligibility rules; some limited exceptions apply. Players may hold more than one non-FIFA nationality.

No.	Pos.	Nation	Player
—	MF	COL	Samuel Perez Apontey (at TJ Štart Nitrianske Hrnčiarovce until 30 June 2027)
—	GK	SVK	Tomáš Krištof (at FK Slovan Duslo Šaľa until 30 June 2027)
—	MF	SVK	Marko Bača (at FK Slovan Levice until 30 June 2027)

No.	Pos.	Nation	Player
—	FW	GAM	Mamadou Gingally (at FK Ventspils until 30 November 2026)
—	MF	SVK	Maximilian Kubička (at FC Pata until 30 June 2027)
—	MF	SVK	Marek Výbošťok (at OFK Dunajská Lužná until 30 June 2027)

=== Reserve squad ===
The following players have previously made appearances or have appeared on the substitutes bench for the first team.

Note: Flags indicate national team as defined under FIFA eligibility rules; some limited exceptions apply. Players may hold more than one non-FIFA nationality.

No.	Pos.	Nation	Player
—	GK	SVK	Tomáš Domaniský
71	GK	SVK	Martin Gajdoš
24	DF	SVK	Martin Tóth
—	DF	SVK	Matej Belička
—	DF	SVK	Miroslav Plešivka
27	MF	SVK	Miloš Šimončič

No.	Pos.	Nation	Player
—	MF	SVK	Filip Kozlík
—	MF	SVK	Martin Mikula
—	FW	SVK	Matúš Hipš
—	FW	SVK	Kristián Pajer
—	MF	UKR	Artem Okhtyrov

== Current technical staff ==
As of 11 August 2026

Staff	Job title
(Slovakia) Andrej Štefanka	Manager
(Slovakia) Marek Tomiš	Assistant manager
(Slovakia) Miroslav Reischl	Assistant manager
(Slovakia) Štefan Senecký	Goalkeeping coach
(Slovakia) Viliam Mečár	Team Doctor
(Slovakia) Peter Januška	Physiotherapist
(Slovakia) Ján Andraško	Physiotherapist

== Honours ==
=== Domestic ===
Czechoslovakia

- Czechoslovak First League (1925–1993)
  - Runners-Up (1): 1961–62
  - Third place (1): 1988–89
- 1.SNL (1st Slovak National football league) (1969–1993)
  - Winners (3): 1978–79, 1985–86, 1991–92

Slovakia

- Slovak League (1993–Present)
  - Third place (1): 2007–08
- Slovenský Pohár (Slovak Cup) (1961–Present) 1
  - Runners-up (4): 1974–75, 1982–83, 1986–87, 1990–91
- Slovak Second Division (1993–Present)
  - Winners (3): 1994–95, 1997–98, 2004–05
  - Runners-Up (2): 2000–01, 2016–17
- Slovak Fourth Division
  - Winners (1): 2025–26

==== Czechoslovak and Slovak Top Goalscorer ====
The Czechoslovak League top scorer from 1944–45 until 1992–93. Since the 1993–94 Slovak League Top scorer.

Year	Winner	G
1959–60	(Czechoslovakia) Michal Pucher	18
2005–06	(Slovakia) Róbert Rák	21^{1}
2009–10	(Slovakia) Róbert Rák	18

^{1}Shared award

=== European ===
- Mitropa Cup 2
  - Runners-up: 1961
- Intertoto Cup
  - Winners (3): 1972, 1973, 1980

== Results ==
=== League and Cup history ===
Slovak League only (1993–present)

Season	Division (Name)	Pos./Teams	Pl.	W	D	L	GS	GA	P	Slovak Cup	Europe		Top Scorer (Goals)
1993–94	1st (Mars Superliga)	12/(12)	32	12	3	17	39	46	27	Round 3			(Slovakia) Juraj Vrábel (7)
1994–95	2nd (1. liga)	1/(16)	30	19	5	6	58	29	62	Round 2			(Slovakia) Martin Prohászka (13)
1995–96	1st (Mars Superliga)	11/(12)	32	7	5	20	30	59	26	Round 1			(Slovakia) Norbert Hrnčár (7)
1996–97	1st (Mars Superliga)	16/(16)	30	5	5	20	22	48	20	Round 1			(Slovakia) Martin Prohászka (4)
1997–98	2nd (1. liga)	1/(16)	34	20	8	6	73	36	68	Round 2			(Slovakia) Peter Hodúr (18)
1998–99	1st (Mars Superliga)	12/(16)	30	7	7	16	28	48	28	Round 2			(Slovakia) Marián Klago (8)
1999–00	1st (Mars Superliga)	13/(16)	30	8	4	18	24	44	28	Round 2			(Slovakia) Róbert Jež (4) (Slovakia) Jozef Jelšic (4)
2000–01	2nd (1. Liga)	2/(18)	34	21	3	10	77	27	66	Round 1			(Slovakia) Mário Breška (23)
2001–02	2nd (1. Liga)	7/(16)	30	12	7	11	41	34	43	Round 1			(Slovakia) Jozef Jelšic (17)
2002–03	2nd (1. Liga)	12/(16)	30	11	5	14	36	29	38	Quarter-finals			(Slovakia) Jozef Jelšic (15)
2003–04	2nd (1. Liga)	4/(16)	30	15	3	12	45	32	48	Round 2			(Slovakia) Róbert Rák (13)
2004–05	2nd (1. Liga)	1/(16)	36	21	6	3	49	16	69	Round 2			(Slovakia) Róbert Rák (27)
2005–06	1st (Corgoň Liga)	5/(10)	36	12	9	15	42	48	45	Semi-finals	UI	2.R ( (Ukraine) Dnipro)	(Slovakia) Róbert Rák (21)
2006–07	1st (Corgoň Liga)	6/(12)	28	9	4	15	21	33	31	Quarter-finals			(Slovakia) Andrej Hesek (6)
2007–08	1st (Corgoň Liga)	3/(12)	33	17	6	10	40	26	57	Quarter-finals	UI	1.R ( (Azerbaijan) Neftçi Baku)	(Slovakia) Andrej Hesek (5) (Czech Republic) Jan Gruber (5)
2008–09	1st (Corgoň Liga)	11/(12)	33	9	8	16	34	53	35	Round 2			(Slovakia) Róbert Rák (9)
2009–10	1st (Corgoň Liga)	4/(12)	33	14	6	13	42	40	48	Round 3			(Slovakia) Róbert Rák (18)
2010–11	1st (Corgoň Liga)	8/(12)	33	11	7	15	30	51	40	Quarter-finals	EL	Q1 ( (Hungary) ETO Győr)	(Slovakia) Róbert Rák (9)
2011–12	1st (Corgoň Liga)	8/(12)	33	9	12	12	33	39	39	Round 3			(Slovakia) Vratislav Gajdoš (5)
2012–13	1st (Corgoň Liga)	10/(12)	33	11	6	16	39	54	36	Round 3			(Brazil) Cléber (11)
2013–14	1st (Corgoň Liga)	12/(12)	33	6	8	19	33	63	26	Round 2			(Brazil) Cléber (7)
2014–15	2nd (DOXXbet Liga)	5/(24)	22	8	7	7	26	25	31	Round 5			(Slovakia) Matúš Paukner (21)
2015–16	2nd (DOXXbet Liga)	7/(24)	30	13	7	10	54	36	46	Round 4			(Slovakia) Matúš Paukner (17)
2016–17	2nd (DOXXbet liga)	2/(24)	30	18	5	7	57	32	59	Round 5			(Slovakia) Filip Balaj (20)
2017–18	1st (Fortuna Liga)	7/(12)	31	10	12	9	28	27	42	Round 5			(Slovakia) Filip Balaj (6) (Slovakia) Tomáš Vestenický (6)
2018–19	1st (Fortuna Liga)	9/(12)	32	8	10	14	42	48	34	Quarter-finals			(Slovakia) Tomáš Vestenický (10)
2019–20	1st (Fortuna Liga)	12/(12)	27	7	4	16	23	36	25	Quarter-finals			(North Macedonia) Milan Ristovski (12)
2020–21	1st (Fortuna Liga)	12/(12) (Note: FC Nitra did not obtain a licence for the 2021–22 season.)	32	7	6	19	26	55	27	Round 3			(Slovakia) Michal Faško (8)
2021–22	3rd (III. liga)	16/(18)	34	8	2	24	42	75	26	Round 2			(Slovakia) Adrián Mokoš (10)
2022–23	4th (IV. liga)	14/(16)	30	8	6	16	37	51	30	Did not enter			(Slovakia) Radovan Lipovský (7)
2023–24	Did not compete (Note: FC Nitra was declared bankrupt by a court and withdrawn from all competitions.)												
2024–25	4th (IV. liga)	13/(17)	32	8	10	14	42	44	34	Round 1			(Slovakia) Ján Nemčok (7)
2025–26	4th (IV. liga)	1/(16)	30	25	4	1	82	15	79	Round of 16			(Slovakia) Daniel Rapavý (11)

=== European competition history ===
==== UEFA-administered ====
Season	Competition	Round	Country	Club	Home	Away	Aggregate
1961–62	Mitropa Cup	Group					
1961–62	Mitropa Cup	Group	(Czechoslovakia)	Slovnaft Bratislava		4–3	
1961–62	Mitropa Cup	Group	(Italy)	Torino	5–1		
1961–62	Mitropa Cup	Group	(Austria)	SV Stickstoff		4–4	
1961–62	Mitropa Cup	Semi-Finals	(Italy)	Udinese	4–3	1–1	5–4
1961–62	Mitropa Cup	Finals	(Italy)	Bologna	2–2	0–3	2–5
1989–90	UEFA Cup	R1	(Germany)	1. FC Köln	0–1	1–4	1–5
2006	Intertoto Cup	R1	(Luxembourg)	Grevenmacher	6–2	6–0	12–2
2006	Intertoto Cup	R2	(Ukraine)	Dnipro Dnipropetrovsk	2–1	0–2	2–3
2008	Intertoto Cup	R1	(Azerbaijan)	Neftchi Baku	3–1	0–2	3–3 (a)
2010–11	UEFA Europa League	QR1	(Hungary)	ETO Győr	2–2	1–3	3–5

==== Not UEFA-administered ====
Season	Competition	Round	Country	Club	Home	Away
1962–63	Intertoto Cup	Group A4	(Socialist Federal Republic of Yugoslavia)	Sarajevo	5–1	2–3
1962–63	Intertoto Cup	Group A4	(Switzerland)	Servette	0–0	1–2
1962–63	Intertoto Cup	Group A4	(France)	Olympique Nîmes	4–1	0–2
1972	Intertoto Cup	Group 1	(Austria)	SSV Innsbruck	4–1	1–0
1972	Intertoto Cup	Group 1	(Sweden)	Örgryte	3–0	6–2
1972	Intertoto Cup	Group 1	(Denmark)	AB Copenhagen	2–0	3–2
1973	Intertoto Cup	Group 9	(Netherlands)	Amsterdam	4–1	3–2
1973	Intertoto Cup	Group 9	(Germany)	Eintracht Braunschweig	1–1	2–1
1973	Intertoto Cup	Group 9	(Denmark)	Vejle BK	4–1	4–1
1980	Intertoto Cup	Group 5	(Austria)	LASK Linz	0–1	2–1
1980	Intertoto Cup	Group 5	(Denmark)	Esbjerg	2–0	1–0
1980	Intertoto Cup	Group 5	(Poland)	Polonia Bytom	4–0	0–1
1982	Intertoto Cup	Group 3	(Germany)	Werder Bremen	3–5	3–3
1982	Intertoto Cup	Group 3	(Denmark)	Aarhus	3–4	0–1
1982	Intertoto Cup	Group 3	(Austria)	Sturm Graz	5–3	2–0
1987	Intertoto Cup	Group 6	(Sweden)	AIK Stockholm	1–0	0–0
1987	Intertoto Cup	Group 6	(Denmark)	Lyngby	4–1	1–2
1987	Intertoto Cup	Group 6	(Poland)	Lech Poznań	2–1	0–3
1989	Intertoto Cup	Group 2	(East Germany)	Hansa Rostock	3–0	1–1
1989	Intertoto Cup	Group 2	(Denmark)	Boldklubben 1903	1–3	1–3
1989	Intertoto Cup	Group 2	(Sweden)	Malmö FF	1–1	0–0
1990	Intertoto Cup	Group 7	(Hungary)	Tatabánya	4–0	0–0
1990	Intertoto Cup	Group 7	(Switzerland)	Luzern	0–2	1–1
1990	Intertoto Cup	Group 7	(Sweden)	Örebro	1–0	0–0

== Player records ==
=== Most goals ===
#	Nat.	Name	Goals
1	(Slovakia)	Róbert Rák	100
2	(Czechoslovakia)	Michal Pucher	57
3	(Czechoslovakia)	Dušan Borko	42
4	(Slovakia)	Matúš Paukner	38
5	(Slovakia)	Filip Balaj	32
6	(Czechoslovakia) (Slovakia)	Ľubomír Moravčík	30
6	(Czechoslovakia)	Vladimír Ternény	30
7	(Czechoslovakia)	Igor Klejch	29
7	(Czechoslovakia) (Slovakia)	Milan Lednický	29

== Notable players ==
Had international caps for their respective countries. Players whose name is listed in bold represented their countries while playing for FC Nitra.

Past (and present) players who are the subjects of Wikipedia articles can be found here.

- (Slovakia) Marek Bakoš
- (Slovakia) Miroslav Barčík
- (Slovakia) Miloš Belák
- (Slovakia) Henrich Benčík
- (Czechoslovakia) Ivan Bilský
- (Slovakia) Marián Bochnovič
- (Czechoslovakia) **Dušan Borko**
- (Slovakia) Mário Breška
- (Czechoslovakia) Miroslav Čmarada
- (Slovakia) Igor Demo
- (Slovakia) Marián Dirnbach
- (Slovakia) Juraj Dovičovič
- (Slovakia) **Pavol Farkaš**
- (Slovakia) Michal Faško
- (Slovakia) **Peter Grajciar**
- (Slovakia) Ján Greguš
- (Czechoslovakia) Vladimír Hagara
- (Slovakia) Michal Hanek
- (Canada) **Kevin Harmse**
- (Israel) Ariel Harush
- (Slovakia) Christián Herc
- (Slovakia) **Andrej Hesek**
- (Czechoslovakia) (Slovakia) **Michal Hipp**
- (Czechoslovakia) **Ján Hlavatý**
- (Slovakia) Ivan Hodúr
- (Slovakia) Eduard Hrnčár
- (Slovakia) Norbert Hrnčár
- (Slovakia) Erik Jendrišek
- (Slovakia) Róbert Jež
- (Slovakia) Jaroslav Kolbas
- (Slovakia) Tomáš Kóňa
- (Slovakia) Miroslav König
- (Czechoslovakia) **Jozef Kukučka**
- (Slovakia) Branislav Labant
- (Ghana) John Mensah
- (Western Armenia) Vahagn Militosyan
- (Czechoslovakia) (Slovakia) Ladislav Molnár
- (Czechoslovakia) (Slovakia) **Ľubomír Moravčík**
- (Uganda) Isaac Muleme
- (Czechoslovakia) Alexander Nagy
- (Hungary) Zoltán Opata
- (Slovakia) Dušan Perniš
- (Slovakia) Peter Petráš
- (Slovakia) Martin Prohászka
- (North Macedonia) Milan Ristovski
- (Slovakia) Róbert Semeník
- (Slovakia) Štefan Senecký
- (Slovakia) Samuel Slovák
- (Guinea) Seydouba Soumah
- (Slovakia) Miroslav Sovič
- (Slovakia) Miroslav Stoch
- (Slovakia) Lukáš Štetina
- (Cameroon) Léandre Tawamba
- (Czechoslovakia) **Vladimír Ternény**
- (Slovakia) Róbert Tomaschek
- (Czech Republic) Petr Trapp
- (Czechoslovakia) Alexander Vencel sr.

== Former managers ==
- (Hungary) Zoltán Opata (1935–36)
- (Czechoslovakia) Karol Bučko (1959–63)
- (Czechoslovakia) Ladislav Putera (1963–64)
- (Czechoslovakia) Eduard Farman (1964–65)
- (Czechoslovakia) František Skyva (1965–68)
- (Czechoslovakia) Jozef Čurgaly (1968–70)
- (Czechoslovakia) Michal Pucher (1970–74)
- (Czechoslovakia) Ján Dinga (1974–75)
- (Czechoslovakia) Theodor Reimann (1975–76)
- (Czechoslovakia) Michal Pucher (1976–77)
- (Czechoslovakia) František Skyva (1978–83)
- (Czechoslovakia) František Urvay (1983)
- (Czechoslovakia) Jiří Lopata (1984)
- (Czechoslovakia) Stanislav Jarábek (1984–85)
- (Czechoslovakia) Jozef Jarabinský (1985–86)
- (Czechoslovakia) Kamil Majerník (1986–88)
- (Czechoslovakia) Milan Lešický (1988–91)
- (Czechoslovakia) Karol Pecze (1991–92)
- (Czechoslovakia) Stanislav Jarábek (1992–93)
- (Czechoslovakia) S. Dominka (1993)
- (Czechoslovakia) Ivan Horn (1993–95)
- (Slovakia) Milan Albrecht (2001)
- (Slovakia) Ivan Galád (2004–07)
- (Czech Republic) Pavel Hapal (1 Jul 2007 – 30 Jun 2008)
- (Czech Republic) Pavel Malura (9 Jun 2008 – 28 Sep 2008)
- (Slovakia) Marián Süttö (28 Sep 2008 – 31 Dec 2008)
- (Serbia) Petar Kurčubić (1 Jan 2009 – 30 Jun 2009)
- (Slovakia) Ivan Galád (1 Jul 2010 – 13 Jan 2011)
- (Slovakia) Ivan Vrabec (15 Jan 2011 – 14 Mar 2011)
- (Slovakia) Cyril Stachura (15 Mar 2011 – 19 Nov 2011)
- (Slovakia) Róbert Barborík (interim) (20 Nov 2011 – 19 Dec 2011)
- (Slovakia) Ladislav Jurkemik (20 Dec 2011 – 5 Nov 2012)
- (Slovakia) Jozef Vukušič (6 Nov 2012 – 30 Jun 2013)
- (Slovakia) Ladislav Šimčo (1 Jul 2013 – 27 Aug 2013)
- (Slovakia) Vladimír Koník (27 Aug 2013 – 19 Feb 2014)
- (Slovakia) Ladislav Hudec (19 Feb 2014 – June 2014)
- (Slovakia) Michal Hipp (Jun 2014 – 23 Sep 2015)
- (Slovakia) Róbert Barborík (23 Sep 2015 – 5 Jan 2017)
- (Slovakia) Ivan Galád (5 Jan 2017 – 13 Mar 2019)
- (Slovakia) Michal Kuruc (13 Mar 2019 – 20 Jun 2019)
- (Slovakia) Marián Süttö (20 Jun 2019 – 6 Jan 2020)
- (Ukraine) Anatoliy Demyanenko (6 Jan 2020 – May 2020)
- (Slovakia) Miroslav Nemec (May 2020 – 29 Jun 2020)
- (Slovakia) Ivan Galád (29 Jun 2020 – Aug 2020)
- (Slovakia) Gergely Geri (Aug 2020 – 1 Dec 2020)
- (Slovakia) Ivan Galád (interim) (1 Dec 2020 – 4 Jan 2021)
- (Czech Republic) Michal Ščasný (4 Jan 2021 – 22 Jan 2021)
- (Slovakia) Peter Lérant (22 Jan 2021 – 25 Mar 2021)
- (Czech Republic) Michal Ščasný (26 Mar 2021 – 24 Jan 2022)
- (Slovakia) Miloš Foltán (25 Jan 2022 - 12 apr 2022)
- (Slovakia) Augustín Antalík (13 apr 2022 – July 2022)
- (Slovakia) Jozef Kozák (July 2022 – 28 Feb 2023)
- (Slovakia) Dušan Borko (1 Mar 2023- June 2023)
- (Slovakia) Miloš Foltán (2024)
- (Slovakia) Igor Slezák (2024-2026)
- (Slovakia) Andrej Štefanka (2026-)

== FC Nitra Women ==
In 2013, a women's section was established within FC Nitra. Initially, a girls' team was formed, followed by the establishment of a full-fledged senior women's team in 2014. From the 2014–15 season, the women's team competed in the second-highest Slovak women's football division, and from the 2015–16 season onwards, it competed in the top division. The team was relegated from the top division in the 2021–22 season, but due to the club's financial problems at the time, the senior women's team did not participate in the second division either. The club returned to the second-highest women's football division in the 2025–26 season after new owners took over the club. The women's team's greatest achievement was winning Group A of the second-highest division in the 2014–15 season. The women's team plays its home matches at Štadión pod Zoborom.
