= Jaroslav Vejvoda =

Czech football player and coach (1920–1996)

Personal information
- Date of birth: 1 July 1920
- Place of birth: Prague, Czechoslovakia
- Date of death: 28 July 1996 (aged 76)
- Place of death: Prague, Czech Republic
- Position: Striker

Senior career*
Years	Team	Apps	(Gls)
1942–1948	Sparta Prague		
1948	Slavia Prague		
1948–1953	FC Vítkovice		

International career
1951	Czechoslovakia	1	(0)

Managerial career
- 1954–1958: FC Vítkovice
- 1958–1960: Baník Ostrava
- 1960–1965: Dukla Prague
- 1966–1969: Legia Warsaw
- 1969–1973: Dukla Prague
- 1973–1975: Legia Warsaw
- 1975–1980: Dukla Prague
- * Club domestic league appearances and goals

Jaroslav Vejvoda (1 July 1920 – 28 July 1996) was a Czech footballer and manager.

He played for Sparta Prague, Slavia Prague and FC Vítkovice. He capped once for Czechoslovakia.

He coached Dukla Prague, where he won the Czechoslovak League six times. He also coached at FC Vítkovice, Baník Ostrava and Legia Warszawa, with whom he won the Ekstraklasa in 1969.

== Managing Dukla ==
Vejvoda arrived at Dukla Prague in 1960, winning the Czechoslovak First League in his first season. With Vejvoda in charge, the club went on to win consecutive league titles in 1961–62, 1962–63 and 1963–64. The club only managed to finish eighth in the 1964–65 season, and he left the club midway through the 1965–66 season, although the club went on to win another championship under Vejvoda's replacement, Bohumil Musil. Vejvoda returned to Dukla in 1969, in the fifth round of the 1969–70 Czechoslovak First League. The team eventually finished the season in seventh position. In three further full seasons with the club, they failed to win another title, finishing 13th, third and fourth. Vejvoda's third spell at Dukla commenced in 1975, replacing Josef Masopust as manager from the sixth round of the 1975–76 Czechoslovak First League. The club finished the season in fourth place before winning the league in 1976–77 and 1978–79, taking Vejvoda's record to six championships with the club. In the 1977–78 season the club finished second, and they finished fourth in 1979–80, which was to be Vejvoda's final season in charge of the Prague club Under Vejvoda, Dukla won six of their eleven league championships.

== Honours ==
=== Managerial ===
Dukla Prague

- Czechoslovak First League: 1960–61, 1961–62, 1962–63, 1963–64, 1976–77, 1978–79

Legia Warsaw

- Ekstraklasa: 1968–69
