= Milan Lednický =

Slovak soccer player

Personal information
- Date of birth: 15 May 1968 (age 58)
- Place of birth: Považská Bystrica, Czechoslovakia
- Position: Forward

Youth career
- Nitra

Senior career*
Years	Team	Apps	(Gls)
1986–1990	Plastika Nitra	86	(19)
1990–1991	Inter Bratislava		
1991–1992	Banská Bystrica		
1992–1994	Plastika Nitra	46	(10)
1994–1995	Coring Bohumín		
1995–1996	1. FSV Mainz 05	15	(0)
1997–1998	Lázně Bohdaneč	2	(0)
–	Anagennisi Dherynia		

International career
1986–1989	Czechoslovakia U21	18	(0)
- * Club domestic league appearances and goals

Milan Lednický (born 15 May 1968) is a retired footballer, who played as a forward, and a FIFA-licensed players' agent. He spent the longest period of his career playing for Nitra, for whom he made over 100 league appearances spanning the Czechoslovak First League and the Slovak First Football League.

== Club career ==
Lednický began playing professional football with TJ Plastika Nitra in 1986. He would spend four seasons with the club before moving to FK Inter Bratislava. He later returned to Nitra for two more seasons, appearing in a total of 132 league matches for the club. He would join second division side FK Coring Bohumín in 1994.

Lednický moved to Germany in July 1995, joining German second division side 1. FSV Mainz 05 for one season. During his time at the club he played 15 league games and twice in the DFB-Pokal. He went on to the Czech Republic in 1997, where he played one season in the Czech First League for Lázně Bohdaneč. He would also have a spell in Cyprus with Anagennisi Dherynia. Lednický retired from professional football at the age of 30 after a series of injuries.

== International career ==
Lednický played at junior level for the Czechoslovakia national teams, scoring 7 goals in 24 appearances across various age groups between 1983 and 1986. Between 1986 and 1989 he played 18 times for Czechoslovakia U21 without scoring.

== Football agent ==
After his playing career Lednický became a FIFA-licensed agent, representing international players such as Filip Hološko and Štefan Senecký. He is the director of football agent firm Football Service Agency, which he set up in 2002.
