= Ladislav Molnár =

Czechoslovak soccer player and soccer coach

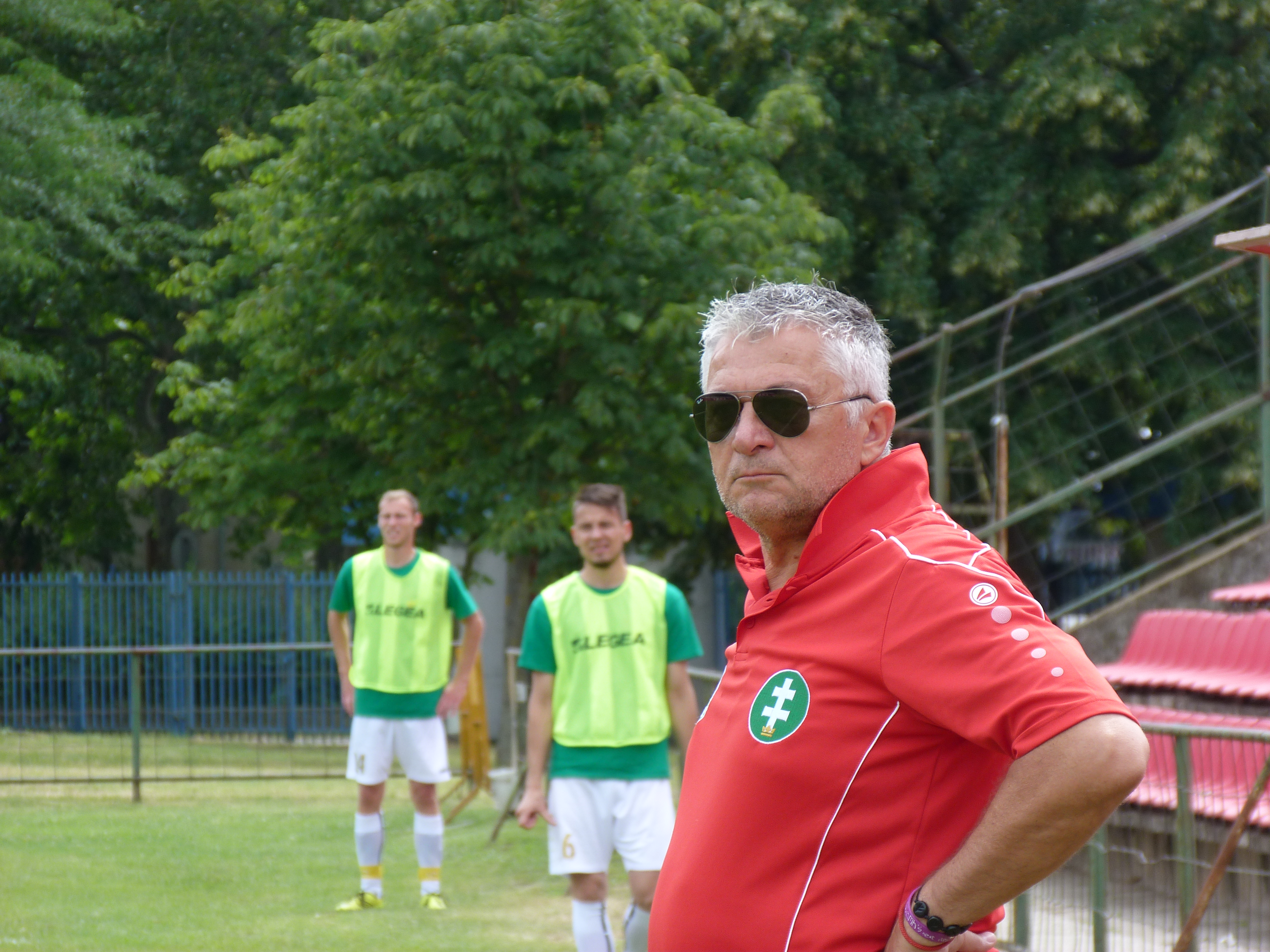
- Ladislav Molnár - 2015

Personal information
- Date of birth: 12 September 1960 (age 66)
- Place of birth: Smolenice, Czechoslovakia
- Height: 1.85 m (6 ft 1 in)
- Position: Goalkeeper

Youth career
- Sládkovičovo
- Sereď
- Dukla Prague

Senior career*
Years	Team	Apps	(Gls)
1982–1988	Nitra	20	(0)
1988–1989	Žilina	0	(0)
1989–1994	Inter Bratislava	133	(0)
1994–1996	Slovan Bratislava	64	(1)
1996–1999	Košice	56	(0)
Total		273	(1)

International career
1993	RCS	1	(0)
1994–1997	Slovakia	24	(0)

Managerial career
- 1999–2000: Košice
- 2001: Spartak Trnava
- 2002: Koba Senec
- 2002: Újpest
- 2002–2003: Petrochema Dubová
- 2003–2004: Banská Bystrica
- 2004–2005: Slovácko
- 2005–2006: Petržalka
- 2006–2007: Michalovce
- 2006–2007: Banská Bystrica
- 2008: Ružomberok B
- 2010: Moldava nad Bodvou
- 2011: Ružomberok В
- 2012: Lučenec
- 2012–2013: Dolný Kubín
- 2014–2015: Duslo Šaľa
- 2015–2016: Spartak Vráble
- 2017: Gyirmót
- * Club domestic league appearances and goals

Ladislav Molnár (born 12 September 1960) is a Slovak football manager and former goalkeeper.

== Honours ==
=== Manager ===
1.FC Košice

- Slovak Cup: Runners-up: 1999-00

Koba Senec

- Slovak Cup (1): 2001-02

Dukla B.Bystrica

- Slovak Super Liga Runners-Up (1): 2003-04
