= Dušan Borko =

Slovak footballer (born 1958)

Personal information
- Date of birth: 17 October 1958 (age 68)
- Place of birth: Handlová, Czechoslovakia

Senior career*
Years	Team	Apps	(Gls)
1979–1985	Plastika Nitra		
1985–1986	VTJ Tábor		
1986–1990	Plastika Nitra		
1990–1997	Wacker Wien		

International career
1982	Czechoslovakia	1	(0)

Managerial career
- 2020–2022: Slovan Nitra Chrenova
- 2023: FC Nitra
- 2025–: Slovan Nitra Chrenova
- * Club domestic league appearances and goals

Dušan Borko (born 17 October 1958) is a Slovak former footballer who played as a striker. He played one match for the Czechoslovakia national football team in 1982. He played 199 games in the league and scored 56 goals. He is most known for playing with Plastika Nitra, with whom he has the second most appearances in the club's history.

== Club career ==
Borko went to Nitra in 1979 to study at the VŠP and play football. Out of several offers, he would choose Slovan Nitra, a club which at the time played in the Czechoslovak First League. He played in the 1987 Slovak Cup final against DAC Dunajská Streda, being substituted off in the 77th minute before Nitra would lose 6–5 on penalties after drawing 0–0 at full time. Borko played a total of 199 games in the league for Nitra, scoring 56 goals. He later played for amateur site FK Veľkej Lehôtky. He scored for the club in a 6–0 win against FC Ibbenbüren in an international friendly.

== International career ==
In 1982, Borko was called up to feature for the Czechoslovakia national football team in a friendly match against Brazil. He came on as a substitute in the 79th minute of a 1–1 draw.

== Coaching career ==
After his retirement, Borko was an assistant coach to Ivan Horn at FC Nitra. He later became the executive director for two years and then again an assistant to coach Jozef Prochotský. In 2020, he became the head coach of 8th tier side, Slovan Nitra Chrenova. He helped the side get promoted back into the regional competitions. On 27 February 2023, Borko became the head coach of Nitra. In April 2025, he re-joined Slovan Nitra Chrenova, taking the position of manager.
