= Marián Bochnovič =

Slovak footballer

Personal information
- Date of birth: 3 March 1970 (age 56)
- Height: 1.73 m (5 ft 8 in)
- Position: Midfielder

Senior career*
Years	Team	Apps	(Gls)
1987–1993	Nitra	86+	(3+)
1993	Bohemians	7	(0)
1994–1996	Dukla Banská Bystrica	80	(19)
1997–1998	1. FC Košice	31	(3)
1998	Dubnica	11	(2)
1999	Tatran Prešov		
1999–2000	First Vienna		
2000–2001	Hapoel Tzafririm Holon	14	(0)
2001–2002	Andau		
2003–2004	Veľký Lapáš		
2004–2006	Nitra	20	(1)
2006–2007	Neded		
2007–2008	PFK Piešťany		

International career
- Czechoslovakia U20
- Czechoslovakia U21
1995–1997	Slovakia	4	(0)

Managerial career
- MFsK Nitra (futsal)
- KFC Kalná nad Hronom
- Slovan Bratislava (youth)
- Slovakia U17 (assistant)
- * Club domestic league appearances and goals

Marián Bochnovič (born 3 March 1970) is a Slovak former professional footballer who played as a midfielder.

== Career ==
A youth international for Czechoslovakia, he was a squad member at the 1989 FIFA World Youth Championship. (Note: Marián Bochnovič at WorldFootball.net) At the same time, he helped Nitra win bronze medals in the 1988–89 Czechoslovak First League; 35 years later, Bochnovič was a part of a "team of legends" match against Sparta veterans.

Bochnovič won the 1996–97 and 1997–98 Slovak Superliga with 1. FC Košice, and played for the team in the 1997–98 UEFA Champions League group stage. He was capped four times for Slovakia. (Note: Marián Bochnovič at National-Football-Teams.com)

In 2001, he wanted to move down to playing football on an amateur level, and tried joining Baloň. After finishing his football career, Bochnovič played futsal, and in 2009 started coaching the futsal team MFsK Nitra. He later served as manager of KFC Kalná nad Hronom until he went to Slovan Bratislava's academy in early 2021. He has also been assistant coach of Slovakia national youth teams.

== Personal life ==
After his football career, he worked in financial consulting. He had three children.
