= Ivan Galád =

Slovak footballer and manager

Personal information
- Date of birth: 10 April 1963 (age 63)
- Place of birth: Krupina, Czechoslovakia

Senior career*
Years	Team	Apps	(Gls)
- MFK Strojár Krupina
- Lokomotíva Bučina Zvolen
- FK Družstevník Dobrá Niva
- Slovan Sliač

Managerial career
- 1996–2000: Lokomotíva Zvolen
- 2000–2002: ŠK Petrochema Dubová
- 2003–2007: Nitra
- 2007: Senec
- 2008–2009: AS Trenčín
- 2009–2010: Nitra
- 2011–2014: Slovakia U21
- 2014–2015: Ružomberok
- 2016: Iskra Borčice
- 2017–2019: Nitra
- 2019: AS Trenčín
- 2020: Nitra
- 2020: Nitra (caretaker)
- 2022–2023: Zlaté Moravce
- 2024–2025: AS Trenčín
- * Club domestic league appearances and goals

Ivan Galád (born 10 April 1963) is a Slovak football manager and former player, who was most recently the head coach of AS Trenčín.

He previously managed Slovakia's national under-21 team.

== Honours ==
=== Manager ===
FC Nitra

- DOXXbet liga: 2004–05 (promoted); runner-up 2016–17 (promoted)

Slovakia U21

- UEFA European Under-21 Championship Play-off: 2013, 2015
