= Andrej Hesek =

Slovak footballer

Personal information
- Full name: Andrej Hesek
- Date of birth: 12 June 1981 (age 45)
- Place of birth: Bratislava, Czechoslovakia
- Height: 1.87 m (6 ft 2 in)
- Position: Striker

Youth career
- FK Vrakuňa
- Slovan Bratislava
- 2000–2001: Banská Bystrica

Senior career*
Years	Team	Apps	(Gls)
2002–2004	Slovan Bratislava	8	(0)
2004	→Koba Senec (loan)	7	(0)
2004–2005	→OFK Veľký Lapáš (loan)		
2006–2008	Nitra	65	(14)
2008–2010	Teplice	27	(2)
2009	→Jablonec (loan)	13	(2)
2010	→Senica (loan)	14	(5)
2010–2011	Banská Bystrica	19	(6)
2011	Michalovce	8	(2)
2012	APOP Kinyras Peyias	9	(3)

International career^{‡}
2007	Slovakia	2	(0)
- * Club domestic league appearances and goals as of 22 January 2012 ‡ National team caps and goals as of 12 September 2011

Andrej Hesek (born 12 June 1981 in Bratislava) is a Slovak former football striker who currently plays for APOP Kinyras Peyias.
