= Milan Lešický =

Slovak football manager (born 1945)

Personal information
- Date of birth: 11 July 1945 (age 81)
- Place of birth: Trenčianske Teplice, Czechoslovakia

Senior career*
Years	Team	Apps	(Gls)
- Nitra
- ČH Bratislava

Managerial career
- 1978–1980: Slovan Galanta
- 1989–1991: Nitra
- 1993–1997: Slovakia U21
- 2003: Žilina
- 2004: Púchov
- 2004–2005: Spartak Trnava
- * Club domestic league appearances and goals

Milan Lešický (born 11 July 1945) is a Slovak football manager and former player. From 2006 until May 2008, he worked also in Viktoria Žižkov as a sports director.
