= Marián Süttö =

Slovak football manager

Personal information
- Full name: Marián Süttö
- Date of birth: 23 December 1965 (age 60)
- Place of birth: Nitra, Czechoslovakia
- Position: Midfielder

Team information
- Current team: Slovan Galanta (manager)

Senior career*
Years	Team	Apps	(Gls)
1985−1990	Plastika Nitra		
????−1994	Dukla Banská Bystrica		
1994−1996	ŠM Gabčíkovo		
1996−1997	Dubnica nad Váhom		
1998−1999	VTJ Koba Senec		
2000	ŠKP Devín		
2000–2002	Andau		
2002–2004	OFK 1948 Veľký Lapáš		

Managerial career
- 2008–2009: Nitra
- 2009: Sereď
- 2010–2011: Spartak Vráble
- 2013–2014: OFC Gabčíkovo
- 2014–2015: Slovan Galanta
- 2015–2017: Sereď
- 2017–2018: Lokomotíva Zvolen
- 2019: Nitra
- 2020–: Slovan Galanta
- * Club domestic league appearances and goals as of 4 January 2021

Marián Süttö (born 23 December 1965) is a retired Slovak professional footballer and currently a manager of Slovan Galanta in 3. Liga West. He previously coached Slovak Super Liga club FC Nitra.
