= Ivan Hodúr =

Slovak footballer

Personal information
- Full name: Ivan Hodúr
- Date of birth: 7 October 1979 (age 47)
- Place of birth: Šaľa, Czechoslovakia
- Height: 1.78 m (5 ft 10 in)
- Position: Attacking midfielder

Youth career
- Sereď
- Nitra

Senior career*
Years	Team	Apps	(Gls)
1998–2000	Nitra	56	(4)
2001–2007	Slovan Liberec	143	(17)
2008	Mladá Boleslav	9	(0)
2008	Ružomberok	13	(0)
2009–2011	Nitra	79	(7)
2012	Zagłębie Lubin	9	(0)
2013	Spartak Trnava	11	(0)
2013	Dunajská Streda	7	(0)

International career
2002–2006	Slovakia	12	(0)
- * Club domestic league appearances and goals

Ivan Hodúr (born 7 October 1979) is a Slovak former professional footballer who played as a midfielder.

== Career ==
Hodúr began his playing career with Nitra, appearing in 56 league matches during his first two seasons. On 14 January 2012, he signed a one-year contract with Polish club Zagłębie Lubin.

== Match fixing ==
In September 2013, Hodúr (and 6 other present or former football players) was accused of match fixing during his time at Dunajská Streda. FIFA considered his case and condemned him with a 25-year-long ban from football activities.

== Honours ==
Slovan Liberec

- Czech First League: 2001–02, 2005–06
