= Jiří Fryš =

Personal information
- Date of birth: 11 March 1950 (age 76)
- Place of birth: Prague, Czechoslovakia

Managerial career
- Years: Team
- 1988–1992: RH Znojmo
- 1993: Dukla Prague
- 1993–1998: SKP Znojmo
- ?–2001: FC Kyjov 1919
- 2001–2002: SK Dolní Kounice
- 2003: LeRK Prostějov
- 2008: SK Sigma Olomouc

Jiří Fryš (born 11 March 1950) is a football manager. He led RH Znojmo for four years, seeing them advance from the Moravian–Silesian Football League (MSFL) to the Second League. He led Dukla Prague during the 1992–93 Czechoslovak First League, taking over after 16 matches of the season from František Plass, with the club finishing the season in 14th place. The following season saw Dukla start with six consecutive defeats, which saw Fryš replaced by Dan Matuška. He returned to Znojmo in 1993 and spent another five years with the club. In 2001 Fryš left his position at FC Kyjov 1919 and shortly later started at SK Dolní Kounice in the MSFL. He left Dolní Kounice in autumn 2002 and took over at LeRK Prostějov in 2003.

Fryš led SK Sigma Olomouc in 2008 for the last three games of the 2007–08 Czech First League after the departure of Martin Pulpit.
