= 1988–89 Czechoslovak First League =

Czechoslovak First League
- Season: 1988–89
- Champions: Sparta Prague
- Relegated: Škoda Plzeň; Spartak Hradec Králové
- European Cup: Sparta Prague
- Cup Winners' Cup: Slovan Bratislava
- UEFA Cup: Baník Ostrava; Plastika Nitra
- Top goalscorer: Milan Luhový (25 goals)

Statistics of Czechoslovak First League in the 1988–89 season. Milan Luhový was the league's top scorer with 25 goals.

== Overview ==
It was contested by 16 teams, and Sparta Prague won the championship.

== Stadia and locations ==
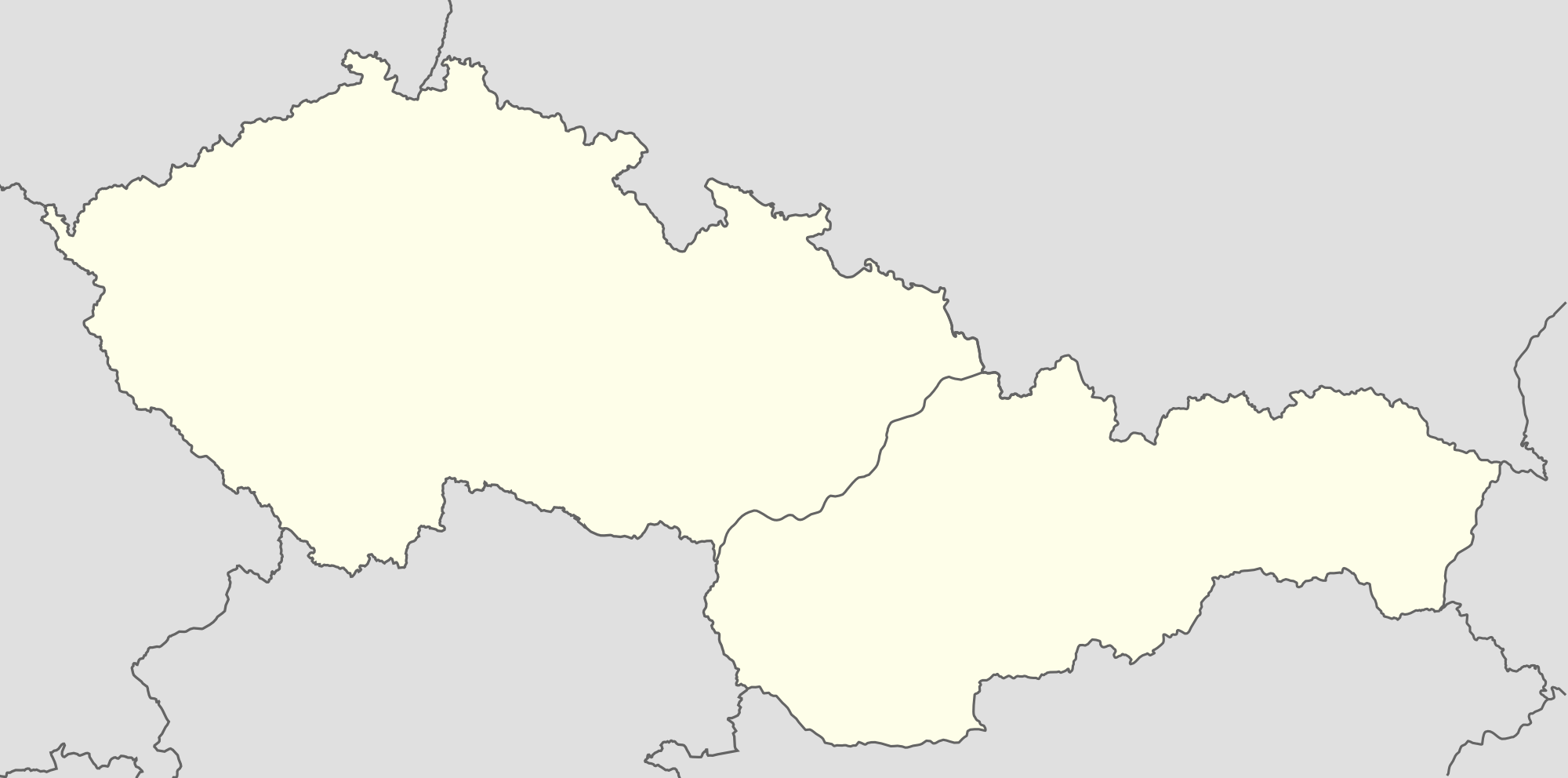
Location of clubs in the 1988–89 Czechoslovak First League

== League standings ==
Pos	Team	Pld	W	D	L	GF	GA	GD	Pts	Qualification or relegation
1	Sparta Prague (C)	30	19	7	4	73	26	+47	45	Qualification for European Cup first round
2	Baník Ostrava	30	19	4	7	54	34	+20	42	Qualification for UEFA Cup first round
3	Plastika Nitra	30	15	4	11	38	40	−2	34	Qualification for UEFA Cup first round
4	Slavia Prague	30	15	3	12	55	49	+6	33	
5	Dukla Prague	30	13	6	11	50	42	+8	32	
6	DAC Dunajská Streda	30	13	5	12	37	41	−4	31	
7	Slovan Bratislava	30	13	4	13	41	39	+2	30	Qualification for Cup Winners' Cup first round (Note: Slovan Bratislava qualified for the Cup Winners' Cup as Czechoslovak Cup runners-up.)
8	Dukla Banská Bystrica	30	13	4	13	50	57	−7	30	
9	Inter Bratislava	30	11	7	12	53	56	−3	29	
10	Sigma Olomouc	30	12	5	13	42	47	−5	29	
11	Vítkovice	30	13	2	15	53	40	+13	28	
12	Spartak Trnava	30	10	7	13	36	46	−10	27	
13	RH Cheb	30	10	4	16	40	54	−14	24	
14	Bohemians Prague	30	10	4	16	41	58	−17	24	
15	Škoda Plzeň (R)	30	10	3	17	40	48	−8	23	Relegation to Czech National Football League
16	Spartak Hradec Králové (R)	30	6	7	17	32	58	−26	19	Relegation to Czech National Football League

Source: rsssf.com
(C) Champions; (R) Relegated

== Results ==
Home \ Away	OST	BOH	DAC	BB	DUK	INT	NIT	CHE	OLO	PLZ	SLA	SLO	SPA	HRK	TRN	VÍT
Baník Ostrava		1–0	3–1	5–2	3–2	2–0	4–2	3–2	2–1	3–1	4–1	2–1	1–1	1–0	0–2	1–0
Bohemians Prague	3–1		1–0	0–2	1–1	1–1	0–1	3–2	1–2	3–2	2–4	1–0	2–4	1–1	1–0	6–2
DAC Dunajská Streda	1–0	3–0		2–0	1–0	2–1	1–0	3–0	3–1	2–1	1–0	5–2	2–2	3–2	1–1	2–0
Dukla Banská Bystrica	1–1	3–1	3–0		1–3	3–0	0–0	5–1	3–1	2–1	3–1	0–1	1–1	3–0	2–1	2–1
Dukla Prague	2–1	0–0	1–0	4–0		3–2	0–2	1–2	3–0	4–2	0–1	2–1	0–0	2–2	5–1	4–1
Inter Bratislava	4–2	1–4	1–0	3–2	3–2		2–2	2–0	1–1	4–0	3–3	1–0	1–2	8–3	3–0	1–0
Plastika Nitra	0–1	2–0	2–1	4–2	3–2	2–1		1–0	2–0	0–0	1–0	3–0	1–0	3–3	2–1	1–4
RH Cheb	1–2	2–1	0–0	2–1	5–0	2–0	0–2		0–3	3–1	1–1	0–2	0–2	2–0	3–1	2–0
Sigma Olomouc	1–3	5–2	2–2	2–0	0–0	1–0	4–0	2–1		1–0	1–2	2–1	0–1	4–0	1–0	1–1
Škoda Plzeň	0–2	2–0	2–0	4–0	2–0	4–1	0–1	1–1	1–2		4–2	2–1	0–0	1–0	4–1	1–0
Slavia Prague	0–2	1–3	4–0	4–2	1–2	5–3	1–0	4–3	4–1	1–0		0–0	3–0	1–0	5–1	2–1
Slovan Bratislava	3–2	3–0	0–0	2–1	1–2	1–1	4–0	0–3	1–1	1–0	2–0		1–0	3–1	1–0	3–2
Sparta Prague	0–0	2–1	6–0	9–1	2–1	0–0	3–1	5–0	5–0	4–1	2–1	5–3		5–0	6–1	2–1
Spartak Hradec Králové	0–0	0–1	1–0	1–2	1–3	2–3	2–0	1–1	3–1	3–2	0–1	0–3	1–2		1–1	1–0
Spartak Trnava	1–0	3–1	2–0	1–1	1–1	1–1	1–0	4–1	4–1	2–0	2–1	1–0	1–2	1–1		0–0
Vítkovice	1–2	7–1	3–1	1–2	2–0	6–1	3–0	3–0	1–0	4–1	5–1	2–0	1–0	0–2	1–0	

Source: statistiky1ligy.fotbal.cz
Legend: Blue = home team win; Yellow = draw; Red = away team win.

== Attendances ==
#	Club	Average	Highest
1	Sparta Praha	10,839	28,105
2	Hradec Králové	8,949	13,326
3	Slovan	8,178	15,063
4	Sigma Olomouc	7,948	12,348
5	Ostrava	6,477	14,059
6	DAC	6,179	8,223
7	Spartak Trnava	6,103	12,237
8	Slavia Praha	6,023	10,451
9	Nitra	4,996	9,036
10	Inter Bratislava	4,149	10,228
11	Vítkovice	4,074	10,198
12	Bohemians	3,992	7,901
13	Plzeň	3,977	12,700
14	Cheb	3,311	6,051
15	Dukla Banská Bystrica	2,512	4,881
16	Dukla Praha	2,146	11,039

== Top scorers ==
The top goalscorers in the 1988–89 Czechoslovak First League were as follows:

Rank	Player	Club	Goals
1	(Czechoslovakia) Milan Luhový	Dukla Prague	25
2	(Czechoslovakia) Radek Drulák	Sigma Olomouc	20
3	(Czechoslovakia) Pavol Diňa	Dukla Banská Bystrica	19
4	(Czechoslovakia) Vladimír Vankovič (Czechoslovakia) Karol Brezík	ŠK Slovan Bratislava; Inter Bratislava	18
5	(Czechoslovakia) Stanislav Griga	Sparta Prague	15
