= František Plass =

Czech footballer and manager (1944–2022)

Personal information
- Date of birth: 18 April 1944
- Place of birth: Plzeň, Protectorate of Bohemia and Moravia
- Date of death: 5 May 2022 (aged 78)
- Positions: Defender; midfielder

Senior career*
Years	Team	Apps	(Gls)
1962–1976	Škoda Plzeň	164	(16)

International career
1968–1972	Czechoslovakia	11	(0)

Managerial career
- 1976–1981: RH Cheb (assistant)
- 1981–1984: Škoda Plzeň
- 1985–1987: VTŽ Chomutov
- 1988–1992: JZD Blšany
- 1992: Dukla Prague
- 1993–1994: FK Ústí nad Labem
- 1994–1995: Slavia Karlovy Vary
- 1995–1996: Union Cheb
- 1996–1997: SK Rakovník
- 1997–1998: FK Tachov
- * Club domestic league appearances and goals

František Plass (18 April 1944 – 5 May 2022) was a football player and manager. He made 164 appearances in the Czechoslovak First League, scoring 16 goals, as well as two appearances in the European Cup Winners' Cup. He played for Czechoslovakia, representing his country 11 times between 1968 and 1972. Plass later worked as a manager, taking charge of numerous teams between 1981 and 1998. He led Dukla Prague during the 1992–93 Czechoslovak First League, but was replaced after 16 games by Jiří Fryš, with the club going on to finish the season in 14th place.
