= TJ Slovan Nitra-Chrenová =

Slovak football club

- Full name: Telovýchovná jednota Slovan Nitra-Chrenová
- Founded: 1933; 93 years ago as TTS Tormoš
- Ground: Štadión TJ Slovan Nitra-Chrenová, Nitra
- Capacity: 500
- Chairman: Peter Barát
- Manager: Dušan Borko
- League: 6. Liga
- 2025–26: 6. Liga, 5th of 14
- Website: https://www.slovanchrenova.sk/
Home colours	Away colours

Telovýchovná jednota Slovan Nitra-Chrenová, commonly known as TJ Slovan Nitra-Chrenová or simply Slovan Chrenová, is a football club based in the Chrenová district of Nitra, Slovakia. The club was founded in 1933 and plays its home matches at Štadión TJ Slovan Nitra-Chrenová in the Chrenová district.

The club currently competes in the sixth tier of the Slovak football league system. In the 2025–26 season, it finished fifth. Former Czechoslovakia and Slovakia internationals Dušan Borko, Igor Demo and Róbert Jež have held various positions at the club.

== History ==
The club was founded in 1933 as TTS Tormoš. At the time, Chrenová, then a separate municipality known as Tormoš, was not part of the city of Nitra. During this period, the club competed in local competitions against teams from the surrounding area, particularly from Nitra. In its first year of existence, the club did not have a permanent home ground. This changed in 1934, after which the club competed in regional competitions. Following the Second World War, the club also began developing its youth system. The club adopted its current name in January 1963, when it was renamed TJ Slovan Chrenová. The club achieved its first major success in 2008, when it won the Nitra District Championship.

In the 2026–27 season, the club reached the second round of the Slovak Cup, where it was eliminated by ŠK Slovan Bratislava. Due to the high level of interest in the match, it had to be played at Štadión pod Zoborom, where a club-record attendance of 3,940 spectators was recorded.
