= Jiří Lopata =

Czech footballer and manager (1936–2021)

Personal information
- Date of birth: 22 December 1936
- Place of birth: Plzeň, Czechoslovakia
- Date of death: 20 April 2021 (aged 84)
- Position: Forward

Senior career*
Years	Team	Apps	(Gls)
1961–1963	Spartak Plzeň	51	(27)
- Škoda České Budějovice

Managerial career
- 1978–1984: RH Cheb
- 1983–1984: Plastika Nitra
- 1985: Czechoslovakia U21
- 1985–1987: Dukla Prague
- 1992–1993: Bohemians Prague
- * Club domestic league appearances and goals

Jiří Lopata (22 December 1936 – 20 April 2021) was a Czech football player and manager. He played two seasons in the Czechoslovak First League, scoring 27 goals in 51 games for Spartak Plzeň. He spent more time in the league as a manager, mainly at RH Cheb, where he remained for five years. He later went on to manage Plastika Nitra, Dukla Prague and Bohemians Prague in the same league. In 1985, he also took charge of the Czechoslovakia under-21 side. Lopata died in 2021 after a long illness.

== Playing career ==
As a player, Lopata scored 16 goals in the 1961–62 season for Spartak Plzeň, a record which had still not been surpassed in 2006. He scored another 11 the following season, but his club were relegated and he never played in the First League again. During his time in the first league he scored two hat-tricks, the first coming in a 5–0 home win against Tatran Prešov. Later in his career, he played for Škoda České Budějovice in the third league, before finishing his playing career in 1967.

== Management career ==
As a manager, Lopata joined RH Cheb in 1978. He celebrated promotion with them and continued in the First League before leaving in the 1983–84 season in order to take over at Plastika Nitra.

Lopata took charge of Dukla Prague for two seasons as manager. He led the club to third place in the 1985–86 Czechoslovak First League, a season which included the club securing a record win of 10–0 against opponents Dynamo České Budějovice. The following year was less successful as the club finished the 1986–87 season in ninth place. The last First League club Lopata managed was Bohemians Prague, where his engagement ran out in 1993.

== Bibliography ==
- Pivoda, Aleš (2013). Legenda se vrátila. Prague: MAC. p. 157. ISBN 978-80-86783-65-9.
