= Andrej Štefanka =

Slovak footballer and manager

Personal information
- Date of birth: 17 December 1978 (age 47)
- Place of birth: Czechoslovakia

Youth career
- –1996: Nitra

Senior career*
| Years | Team | Apps | (Gls) |
| 1996–1997 | Nitra | | |
| 1997–1998 | → Dúbravka (loan) | | |
| 1999–2000 | → TJ Calex Zlaté Moravce (loan) | | |
| 2000-2002 | TJ Calex Zlaté Moravce | | |
| 2002–2003 | ViOn Zlaté Moravce | | |
| 2002–2002 | → TJ Calex Zlaté Moravce (loan) | | |
| 2002–2003 | → TJ Družstevník Baloň (loan) | | |
| 2003–2005 | FK Spartak Vráble | | |
| 2005–2007 | ŠK Močenok | | |
| 2007–2007 | → TJ Družstevník Baloň (loan) | | |

Managerial career
- 2013-2016: FKM Nové Zámky
- 2016-2019: Nitra B
- 2022-2024: ViOn Zlaté Moravce U19
- 2024: ViOn Zlaté Moravce (caretaker)
- 2025-2026: MFK Nová Baňa
- 2026–: Nitra
- * Club domestic league appearances and goals

Andrej Štefanka (born 17 December 1978) is a Slovak football manager and former player. He is currently the manager of FC Nitra.

== Career ==
He is a youth product of FC Nitra and later played in the lower divisions of Slovak football. He subsequently became a coach. Since 2026, he has been the manager of FC Nitra, with whom he won the Slovak Fourth League – West.

== Honours ==
=== Manager ===
FC Nitra

- 4. Liga West: 2025–26 (promoted)
