= Anton Bulla =

Slovak footballer and coach

Personal information
- Date of birth: 17 April 1901
- Date of death: 9 December 1987 (aged 86)
- Position: Forward

Senior career*
Years	Team	Apps	(Gls)
1917–1920	TTE Trencin		
1920–1921	VAS Bratislava		
1921–1924	First Vienna		
1924–1925	Sparta Prague		
1927–1936	ČsŠK Bratislava		

International career
1929–1930	Czechoslovakia Amateur	6	(3)

Managerial career
- 1953: Slovan Bratislava
- 1959–1960: Wacker Innsbruck
- 1961: Slovan Bratislava
- 1961–1962: Dynamo Žilina
- 1962–1963: Slovan Bratislava
- * Club domestic league appearances and goals

Anton Bulla (17 April 1901 – 9 December 1987) was a Slovak professional footballer and coach who played as a forward.

== Career ==
Bulla played club football for ČsŠK Bratislava, turning professional in 1928. He played 8 matches and scored 4 goals in the 1935–36 Czechoslovak First League, the first season to include Slovak clubs. He scored 3 goals in 6 matches for the Czechoslovakia national amateur football team between 1929 and 1930. After he retired from playing, Bulla became a manager, leading his former club ŠK Slovan Bratislava in 1953. He had further spells leading Slovan in the early 1960s, as well as a short period managing Dynamo Žilina.
