= 2004–05 2. Liga (Slovakia) =

Football league season

2. liga
- Season: 2004–05
- Champions: FC Nitra
- Promoted: FC Nitra
- Relegated: FK Rapid Bratislava; FK Slavoj Trebišov; HFK Prievidza; ŠK Kremnička
- Matches played: 240
- Goals scored: 600 (2.5 per match)

The 2004–05 season of the Slovak Second Football League (also known as 2. liga) was the twelfth season of the league since its establishment. It began on 24 July 2004 and ended on 14 June 2005.

== League standing ==
Pos	Team	Pld	W	D	L	GF	GA	GD	Pts	Promotion or relegation
1	FC Nitra (C, P)	30	21	6	3	59	16	+43	69	Promotion to Corgoň Liga
2	Steel Trans Ličartovce	30	18	6	6	66	26	+40	60	
3	Slovan Bratislava	30	14	8	8	37	24	+13	50	
4	Zemplín Michalovce	30	14	5	11	44	35	+9	47	
5	Tatran Prešov	30	12	8	10	38	33	+5	44	
6	Slovan Duslo Šaľa	30	12	7	11	34	32	+2	43	
7	Veľký Lapáš	30	10	12	8	41	34	+7	42	
8	DAC 1904 Dunajská Streda	30	12	6	12	33	45	−12	42	
9	Podbrezová	30	11	8	11	28	22	+6	41	
10	FC Senec	30	11	8	11	40	37	+3	41	
11	Družstevník Báč	30	11	8	11	38	43	−5	41	
12	ViOn Zlaté Moravce	30	9	10	11	32	37	−5	37	
13	Rapid Bratislava (R)	30	7	9	14	37	50	−13	30	Relegation to 3. Liga
14	Slavoj Trebišov (R)	30	8	5	17	28	50	−22	29	Relegation to 3. Liga
15	HFK Prievidza (Note: 6 points deducted.) (R)	30	7	8	15	26	57	−31	23	Relegation to 3. Liga
16	ŠK Kremnička (R)	30	5	2	23	25	65	−40	17	Relegation to 3. Liga

Source: RSSSF.org
Rules for classification: 1) points; 2) goal difference; 3) number of goals scored.
(C) Champions; (P) Promoted; (R) Relegated

== See also ==
- 2004–05 Slovak Superliga
