= Štefan Senecký =

Slovak footballer

Personal information
- Date of birth: 6 January 1980 (age 46)
- Place of birth: Nitra, Czechoslovakia
- Height: 1.86 m (6 ft 1 in)
- Position: Goalkeeper

Youth career
- 1987–1998: Nitra

Senior career*
Years	Team	Apps	(Gls)
1998–2007	Nitra	114	(0)
2007–2009	Ankaraspor	64	(0)
2009–2011	Ankaragücü	14	(0)
2010	→ Slavia Praha (loan)	4	(0)
2012–2014	Sivasspor	2	(0)
2014	Sereď	17	(0)
2015	Ružomberok	1	(0)
2016–2017	Sereď	1	(0)
2018–2021	OFK Veľký Lapáš	?	(0)
2021–2026	Klasov	?	(0)
2026–	Nitra	12	(0)

International career
2007–2009	Slovakia	12	(0)
- * Club domestic league appearances and goals as of 14 February 2017

Štefan Senecký (born 6 January 1980) is a Slovak international footballer who plays as a goalkeeper. He made 12 appearances for Slovakia and played club football in Turkey for Sivasspor and MKE Ankaragücü in the Süper Lig, as well as Ankaraspor, besides clubs in his native Slovakia.

== Club career ==
Senecký played in Turkey for Ankaraspor, MKE Ankaragücü and Sivasspor. He joined Sereď in 2014 after a long-term injury to his achilles. He conceded three goals on his debut for the club in the 2014–15 2. Liga (Slovakia) match against the B-team of MŠK Žilina. He was part of the Ružomberok in 2015 but left at the end of the calendar year having not played a full match for the club. His only league appearance for Ružomberok ended after 18 minutes when he sustained an injury in a 2–1 win against FK Senicain February 2015.

== International career ==
On 22 August 2007, Senecký made his international debut for Slovakia in a 0–1 home defeat against France in friendly. He played three qualifying games en route to qualification for the 2010 FIFA World Cup, but he was not selected to the final squad for the tournament, with Jan Mucha establishing himself as first choice.
