= Jozef Prochotský =

Slovak football manager (born 1951)

Personal information
- Date of birth: 29 April 1951 (age 75)
- Place of birth: Czechoslovakia

Managerial career
- Years: Team
- Artmedia Petržalka
- 1997–1998: Slovan Bratislava
- 1998–2000: Nitra
- 2002: Slovan Bratislava
- 2005–2006: Dukla Banská Bystrica
- Slovan Levice

Jozef Prochotský (born 29 April 1951) is a Slovak football manager. He coached ŠK Slovan Bratislava, Dukla Banská Bystrica and FC Nitra. He is currently head coach of FK Levice.
