= 1961–62 Czechoslovak First League =

Czechoslovak First League
- Season: 1961–62
- Champions: Dukla Prague
- Relegated: Dynamo Žilina; FC Spartak Trnava; Spartak Brno KPS
- European Cup: Dukla Prague
- Cup Winners' Cup: Slovan Bratislava
- Fairs Cup: Spartak ZJŠ Brno
- Top goalscorer: Adolf Scherer (24 goals)

Statistics of Czechoslovak First League in the 1961–62 season.

== Overview ==
It was contested by 14 teams, and Dukla Prague won the championship. Adolf Scherer was the league's top scorer with 24 goals.

== Stadia and locations ==
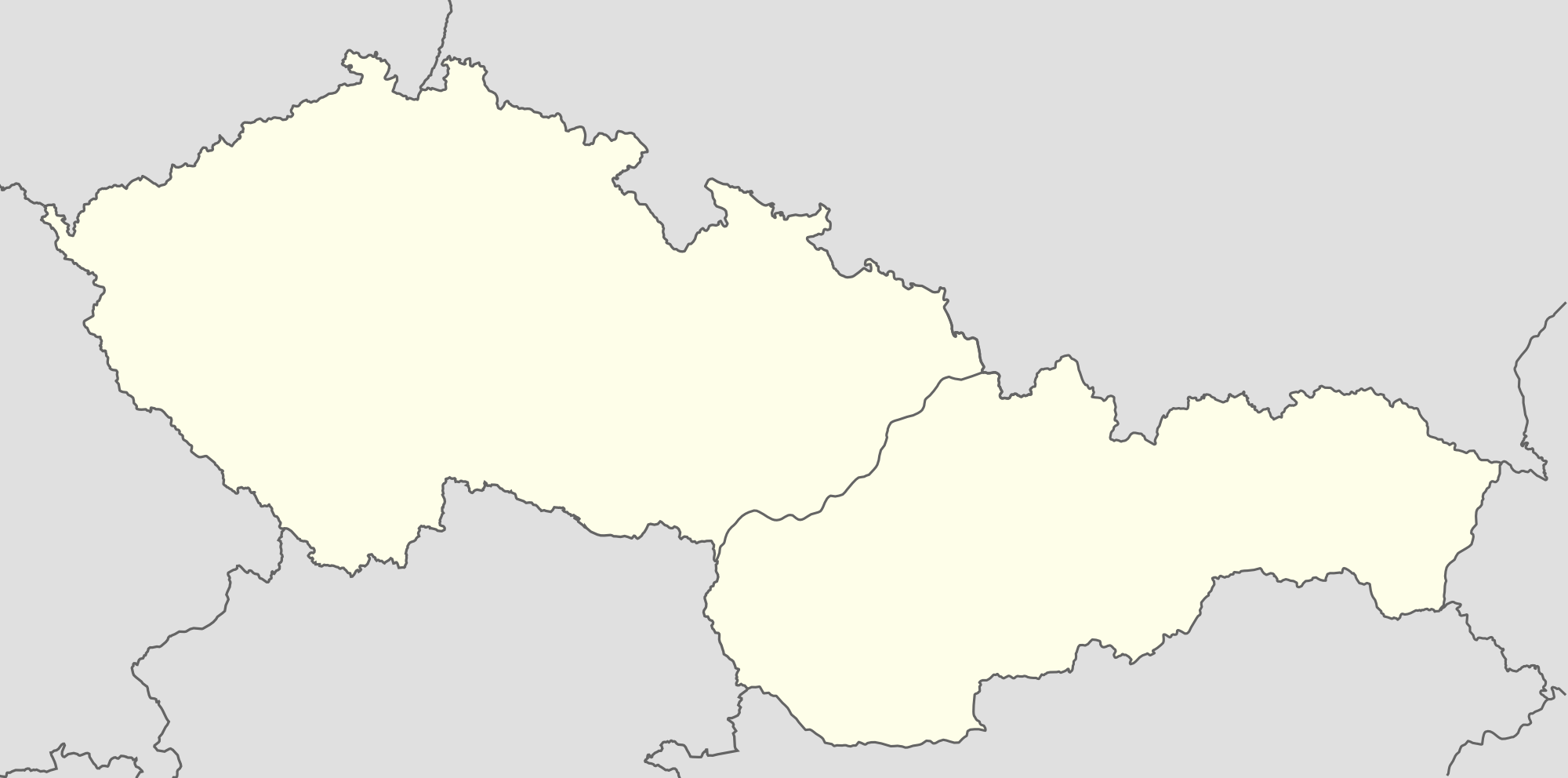
Location of clubs in the 1961–62 Czechoslovak First League

== League standings ==
Pos	Team	Pld	W	D	L	GF	GA	GR	Pts	Qualification or relegation
1	Dukla Prague (C)	26	15	5	6	81	30	2.700	35	Qualification for European Cup preliminary round
2	Slovan Nitra	26	13	6	7	49	44	1.114	32	
3	CH Bratislava	26	11	8	7	56	32	1.750	30	
4	ČKD Prague	26	13	3	10	54	47	1.149	29	
5	Baník Ostrava	26	10	8	8	49	35	1.400	28	
6	Spartak Hradec Králové	26	9	10	7	44	43	1.023	28	
7	Slovan Bratislava	26	13	1	12	51	38	1.342	27	Qualification for Cup Winners' Cup first round
8	Tatran Prešov	26	12	2	12	39	39	1.000	26	
9	Spartak Plzeň	26	10	6	10	45	52	0.865	26	
10	SONP Kladno	26	12	2	12	41	66	0.621	26	
11	Spartak Prague Sokolovo	26	9	7	10	44	44	1.000	25	
12	Dynamo Žilina (R)	26	8	9	9	51	46	1.109	25	Relegation to Czechoslovak Second League (Note: Spartak Praha Sokolovo and Dynamo Žilina were finished on the level points so the play-off game were decided who was relegated to the lower tier.)
13	Spartak Trnava (R)	26	8	6	12	33	46	0.717	22	Relegation to Czechoslovak Second League
14	Spartak Brno KPS (R)	26	1	3	22	22	97	0.227	5	Relegation to Czechoslovak Second League

Source: rsssf.com
(C) Champions; (R) Relegated
Notes:

Spartak ZJŠ Brno invited for the Inter-Cities Fairs Cup from a lower division.

== Results ==
Home \ Away	OST	BRA	ČKD	DUK	ŽIL	SLO	NIT	KLA	BRN	HRK	PLZ	SPA	TRN	PRE
Baník Ostrava		2–0	1–2	1–3	0–0	2–0	2–0	6–0	6–0	3–3	2–2	4–1	2–0	2–0
CH Bratislava	0–0		4–0	2–0	2–2	2–1	4–0	4–0	4–0	3–1	0–0	1–0	1–1	4–1
ČKD Prague	2–0	0–4		1–5	3–0	3–0	0–1	4–1	2–1	3–1	3–1	2–1	4–0	1–3
Dukla Prague	5–2	3–3	0–3		3–1	3–1	3–0	9–0	8–0	6–0	3–0	1–2	4–1	2–1
Dynamo Žilina	1–1	3–2	2–0	2–2		2–0	1–3	7–1	3–0	2–2	0–1	2–2	3–0	1–1
Slovan Bratislava	1–2	3–2	5–2	2–1	4–1		1–0	2–0	5–0	5–0	1–2	4–0	1–0	2–0
Slovan Nitra	2–1	0–0	4–2	0–0	3–3	3–4		3–1	5–1	2–2	1–0	1–0	4–0	1–0
SONP Kladno	3–2	3–1	2–2	2–1	3–0	1–0	4–4		4–1	2–1	4–2	0–3	2–1	2–0
Spartak Brno KPS	2–2	2–6	1–7	1–8	2–1	1–5	2–3	0–1		0–3	1–2	1–1	3–3	0–2
Spartak Hradec Králové	1–1	1–1	2–2	1–1	2–0	2–2	5–1	0–1	3–0		5–1	3–2	1–0	2–0
Spartak Plzeň	0–3	1–0	2–4	1–7	4–3	2–0	2–2	6–2	3–0	3–0		0–0	1–1	5–0
Spartak Sokolovo Prague	2–2	4–3	1–1	3–2	1–1	3–2	3–0	4–1	2–0	1–1	5–1		1–4	1–2
Spartak Trnava	2–0	3–2	3–1	0–0	1–4	2–0	0–2	1–0	5–3	0–0	2–2	3–1		0–1
Tatran Prešov	3–0	1–1	2–0	0–1	3–6	2–0	3–4	2–1	3–0	1–2	3–1	2–0	3–0	

Source: statistiky1ligy.fotbal.cz
Legend: Blue = home team win; Yellow = draw; Red = away team win.

== Relegation play-off ==
Team 1	Score	Team 2
Spartak Prague Sokolovo	2–0	Dynamo Žilina

Dynamo Žilina were relegated to the Czechoslovak Second League.
