= Slovak National Football League =

Football league of Czechoslovakia

- Founded: 1969
- Ceased: 1993
- Replaced by: 2. Liga
- Country: Czechoslovakia
- Last champion: 1. FC Košice
- Level on pyramid: 2
- Promotion to: Czechoslovak First League
- Relegation to: 2nd Slovak National Football League

The Slovak National Football League was the second-tier football league of Czechoslovakia and the top division in Slovak Socialist Republic.

== History ==
- 1969 – Founded as 3. liga, skupina "C" (Czechoslovak third league, group C)
- 1974 – Renamed to Slovenská národná futbalová liga (Slovak national football league)
- 1981 – Renamed to 1. slovenská národná futbalová liga (Slovak first national football league)
- 1993 – Officially dissolved. Top 6 teams created the new Slovak Super Liga, along with all 6 Slovak teams from Czechoslovak First League.
