= Zoltán Molnár =

Zoltán Molnár may refer to:

- Zoltán Molnár (footballer, born 1971), Hungarian footballer
- Zoltán Molnár (footballer, born 1973), Hungarian footballer
- Zoltán Molnár (politician), Hungarian politician
- Zoltán Molnár (rower) (born 1961), Hungarian rower
