= Norbert Hrnčár =

Slovak footballer and manager

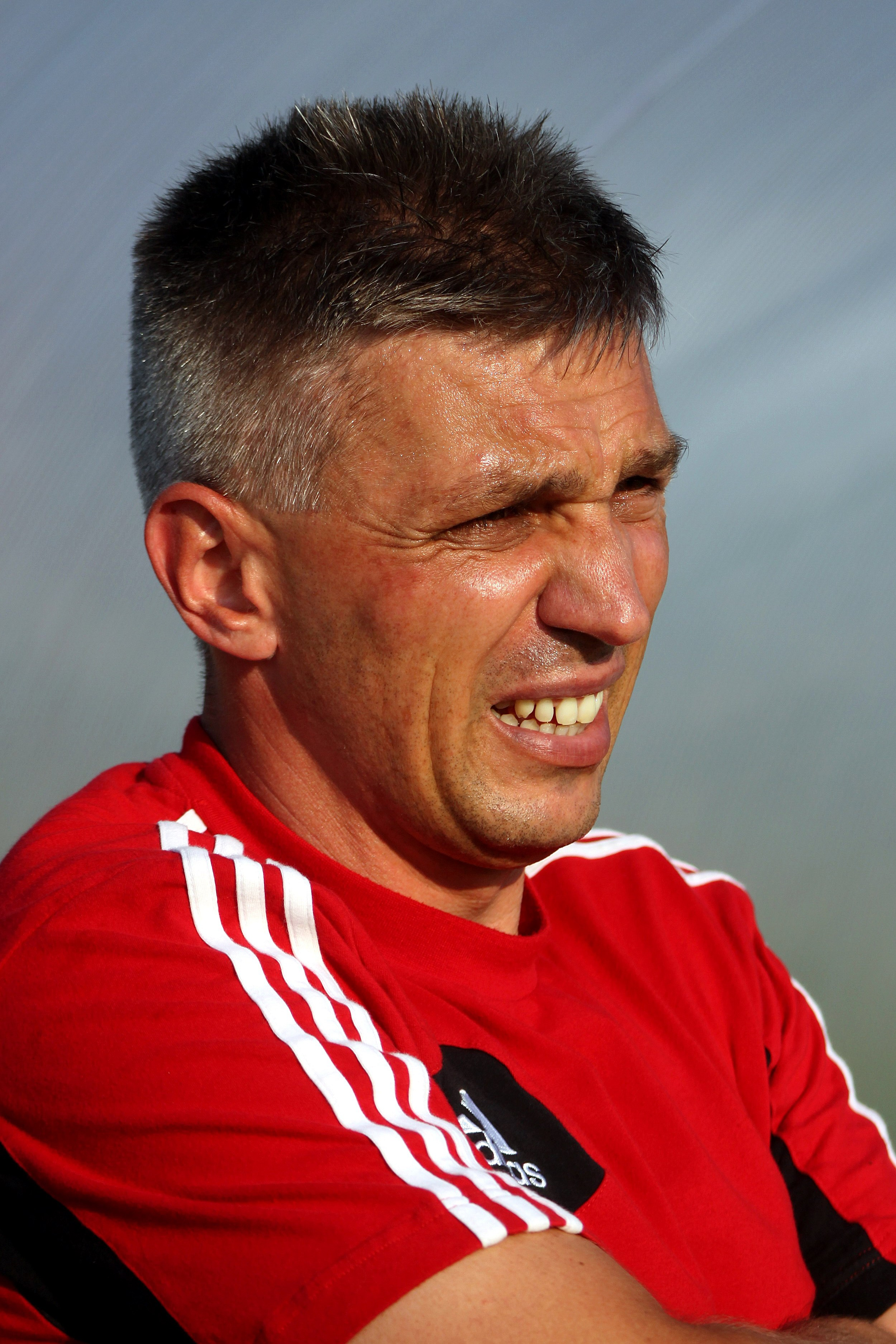

Personal information
- Date of birth: 9 June 1970 (age 56)
- Place of birth: Nitra, Czechoslovakia
- Height: 1.76 m (5 ft 9 in)
- Position: Midfielder

Youth career
- Nitra

Senior career*
Years	Team	Apps	(Gls)
1990–1991	Nitra	1	(0)
1991–1993	Spartak Vráble		
1993–1994	Dukla Banská Bystrica	27	(3)
1994–1996	Nitra	31	(8)
1996–1998	Žilina	51	(5)
1998–2004	Slovan Bratislava	155	(27)

International career
1998–1999	Slovakia	2	(0)

Managerial career
- 2011–2012: Petržalka
- 2012–2014: Dukla Banská Bystrica
- 2015–2016: Spartak Myjava
- 2016–2018: Ružomberok
- 2018–2019: Karviná
- 2019–2020: AS Trenčín
- 2020: Spartak Trnava
- 2022–2023: Zemplín Michalovce
- 2025: Ružomberok
- * Club domestic league appearances and goals

Norbert Hrnčár (born 9 June 1970) is a former Slovak football player and manager.

== Biography ==
Hrnčár spent two seasons in the Slovak top division with FC Nitra, appearing in 32 league matches.

He started his managerial career at Petržalka. In March 2022, Hrnčár replaced Miroslav Nemec as the manager of Zemplín Michalovce.

Hrnčár's son, David, is also footballer, currently playing for Beveren.
