= Bohumil Musil =

Czech football manager (1922–1999)

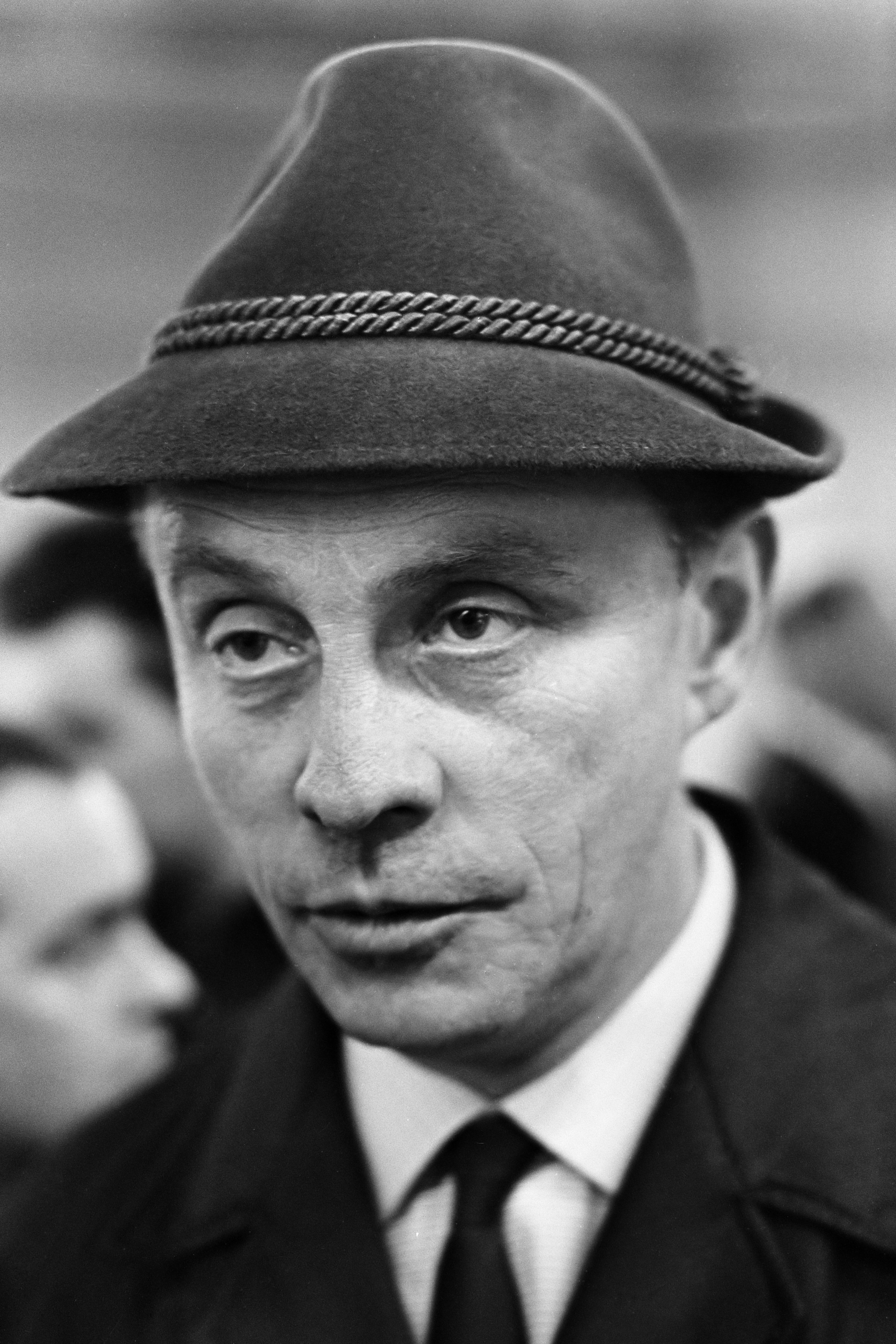
- Musil in 1967

Personal information
- Date of birth: 10 May 1922
- Place of birth: Prague, Czechoslovakia
- Date of death: 5 December 1999 (aged 77)
- Place of death: Czech Republic

Senior career*
Years	Team	Apps	(Gls)
1940–1942	Novoměstský SK Praha		
1943–1945	Baťa Zlín		
1946–1947	Sparta Prague B		
1947–1951	ŠK Banská Bystrica		

Managerial career
- 1949–1951: ŠK Banská Bystrica
- 1951–1952: Czechoslovakia
- 1953–1969: Dukla Prague
- 1969–1971: Dukla Banská Bystrica
- 1971–1972: VCHZ Pardubice
- 1972–1975: Bohemians Prague
- 1975–1979: Slavia Prague (youth)
- 1979–1980: Slavia Prague
- 1981–1983: Xaverov Praha
- * Club domestic league appearances and goals

Bohumil Musil (10 May 1922 – 5 December 1999) was a Czech football player and manager.

As a player, Musil played for several Czechoslovak clubs, but never gained any success with them. He was far more successful as a football coach. After finishing his active career, Musil started to work as a football manager. He coached famous Prague clubs, Dukla Prague and Slavia Prague. He also coached briefly Czechoslovakia national football team.

He led Dukla Prague to two Czechoslovak First League championships, in 1953 and 1966. In 1966 he also won the Czechoslovak Cup with Dukla. Musil was noted for his coaching skills of youth football teams.
