= Štefan Jačiansky =

Slovak football manager

Štefan Jačiansky (June 6, 1930 – October 3, 1995) was a Slovak football manager.

== Career ==
Born in Nădlac, Romania, Jačiansky played football for ŠK Slávia Bratislava.

He coached ŠK Slovan Bratislava, Dynamo Žilina, Tatran Prešov, VSS Košice and ZTS Martin.
