= Eduard Hrnčár =

Slovak footballer

Personal information
- Full name: Eduard Hrnčár
- Date of birth: 8 July 1978 (age 48)
- Place of birth: Czechoslovakia
- Height: 1.80 m (5 ft 11 in)
- Position: Defender

Senior career*
Years	Team	Apps	(Gls)
1996–2000	Nitra	51	(3)
2000–2004	Slovan Bratislava	96	(3)
2004–2005	Niki Volos	17	(0)
2005–2006	Kunovice	11	(0)
2007–2008	Niki Volos	23	(0)
2008–2009	Preveza	23	(0)
2009–2010	Kozani	22	(0)

International career
2002–2003	Slovakia	2	(0)
- * Club domestic league appearances and goals

Eduard Hrnčár (born 8 July 1978) is a Slovak international footballer, who last played as a defender for Kozani F.C.

== Club career ==
Hrnčár began playing professional football with FC Nitra in 1996. He would spend three seasons with the club, appearing in 51 league matches. He would join ŠK Slovan Bratislava in 2000.

Hrnčár moved to Greece in July 2004, initially joining Greek second division side Niki Volos F.C. for one season. After one season with FK Kunovice in the Czech second division, Hrnčár would return to Greece and play in the Greek third division for Niki Volos, Preveza F.C. and Kozani F.C.

== International career ==
Hrnčár made two appearances for the Slovakia national football team.
