= Karol Bučko =

Slovak football manager

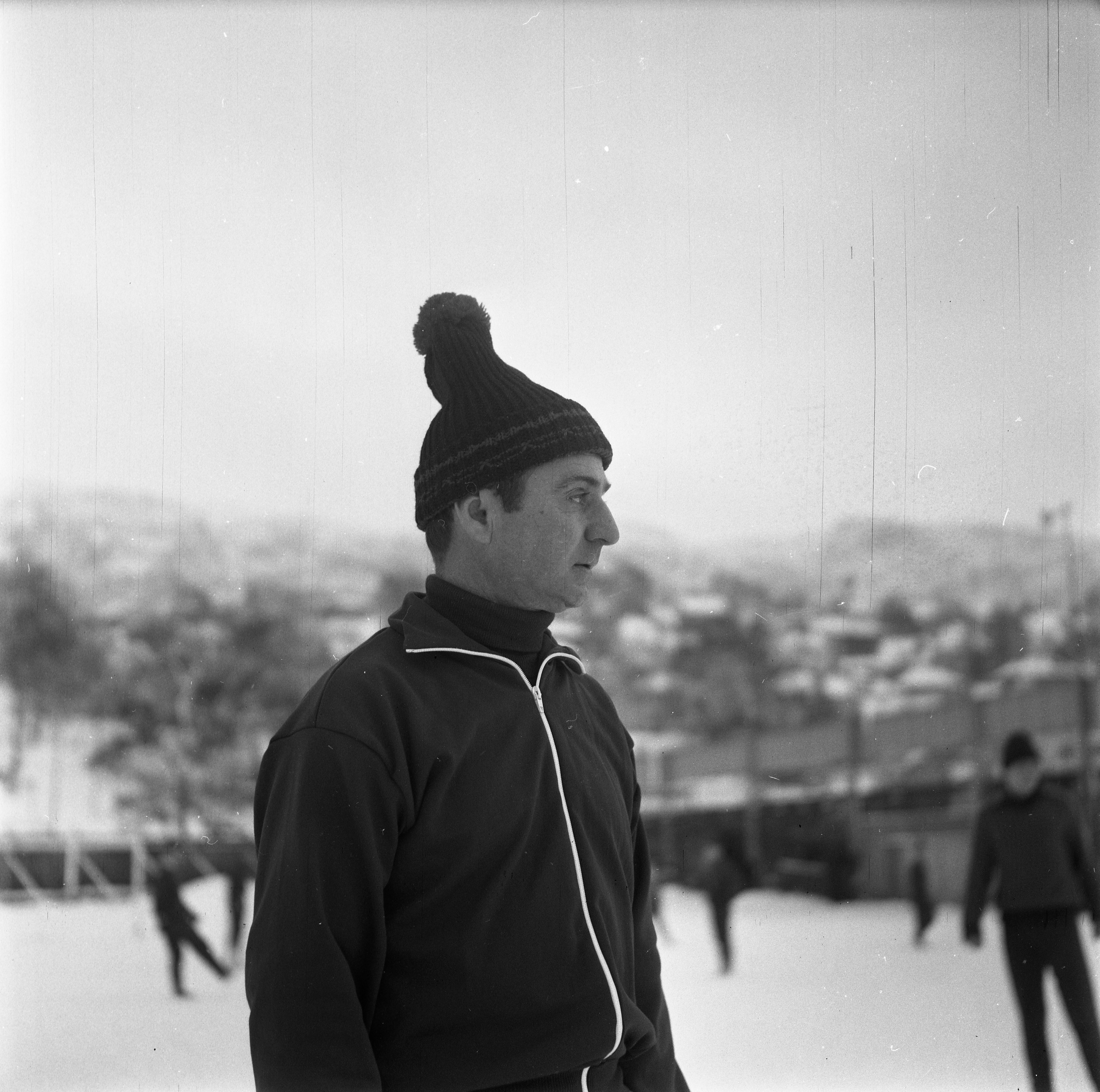

Managerial career
- Years: Team
- 1951–1952: Sokol NV Bratislava
- Slávia Bratislava
- TTS Trenčín
- 1959–1963: FC Nitra
- Inter Bratislava
- VSS Košice
- 1969–1972: SK Brann
- 1972: Banik Ostrava

Karol Bučko is a Slovak former football manager.

He coached Sokol NV Bratislava, Slávia Bratislava, TTS Trenčín, FC Nitra, Inter Bratislava, Banik Ostrava and VSS Košice. He also led ŠKF ZŤS VTJ Martin.
