= Leopold Šťastný =

Slovak football player and coach

Personal information
- Date of birth: 23 May 1911
- Place of birth: Nádasfő, Austria-Hungary
- Date of death: 14 May 1996 (aged 84)
- Place of death: Toronto, Canada
- Position: Defender

Senior career*
| Years | Team | Apps | (Gls) |
| 1935–1940 | ŠK Bratislava | 97 | (?) |

International career
| 1937 | Czechoslovakia | 2 | (0) |
| 1940 | Slovakia | 1 | (0) |

Managerial career
- 1949–1951: Sokol NV Bratislava
- 1954–1957: ÚNV Slovan Bratislava
- 1963–1965: Slovan ChZJD Bratislava
- 1966–1968: Wacker Innsbruck
- 1968–1975: Austria
- * Club domestic league appearances and goals

Leopold Šťastný (23 May 1911 – 14 May 1996) was a Slovak football player and coach. He both played as a defender and coached for ŠK Slovan Bratislava.

He played for both Czechoslovakia and Slovakia at international level.
