= 2022–23 FC Nitra season =

Slovak football club season

FC Nitra
2022–23 season
- Owner: FC Nitra a. s.
- Chairman: Milan Lenčéš (from 5 June)
- Head Coach: Jozef Kozák (until 10 February); Dušan Borko (from 10 February)
- Stadium: Štadión pod Zoborom, Nitra
- 4. Liga: 14th
- Slovak Cup: Did not compete
- Top goalscorer: League: Radovan Lipovský (7); All: Radovan Lipovský (7)
- Highest home attendance: 283 vs TJ Slavoj Boleráz (4. Liga, 6 November 2022)
- Lowest home attendance: 65 vs TJ Imeľ (4. Liga, 23 April 2023)
- Biggest win: 6–0 vs FK Marcelová (4. Liga, 1 October 2022)
- Biggest defeat: 0–4 vs ViOn Zlaté Moravce - Vráble B (4. Liga, 4 September 2022); 0–4 vs OFK Baník Lehota pod Vtáčnikom (4. Liga, 10 September 2022)
| Home colours | Away colours |

The 2022–23 season was FC Nitra's first season in the fourth tier of Slovak football following relegation from the third tier. The club finished 14th out of 16 teams in the fourth tier.

The club continued to face serious financial difficulties during the season, which culminated in July 2023 when the District Court in Nitra declared FC Nitra bankrupt. As a result, the club did not enter the following season and withdrew all of its teams from their respective competitions. Due to the club being declared bankrupt, the players were free to leave the club after the season. However, in November 2023, the Regional Court in Bratislava overturned the decision of the District Court in Nitra, allowing the club to compete in the 2024–25 season. FC Nitra also did not participate in the Slovak Cup during the 2022–23 season because it did not obtain the required licence.

During the season, the club changed managers, with Jozef Kozák being replaced by Dušan Borko on 10 February 2023.

== First-team squad ==
As of 15 june 2023

Note: Flags indicate national team as defined under FIFA eligibility rules; some limited exceptions apply. Players may hold more than one non-FIFA nationality.

| No. | Pos. | Nation | Player |
|---|---|---|---|
| 1 | GK | SVK | Šimon Horváth |
| 3 | DF | SVK | Matúš Mori |
| 4 | DF | SVK | Miloš Ševčík |
| 6 | DF | SVK | Matej Hodulík |
| 7 | DF | SVK | Miroslav Sedlák (captain) |
| 8 | MF | UKR | Vadym Ferentsyk |
| 9 | MF | SVK | Lukáš Ďuriš |
| 10 | FW | SVK | Tomáš Sedlák |
| 11 | FW | SVK | Radovan Lipovský |
| 12 | DF | SVK | Tomáš Tvrdý |
| 13 | MF | BRA | Lucas Tuma Correa |
| 14 | DF | SVK | Jozef Kotula |
| 15 | DF | SVK | Ján Lošonský |
| 16 | DF | SVK | Peter Hornák |

| No. | Pos. | Nation | Player |
|---|---|---|---|
| 17 | FW | NGR | Opeyemi Shuaib Babalola |
| 18 | DF | SVK | Kevin Daniel |
| 19 | MF | SVK | Ivan Polák |
| 31 | GK | SVK | Peter Znamenák |
| — | DF | SVK | Alex Húževka |
| — | DF | SVK | Kristián Polák |
| — | DF | ESP | Yaniv Edery |
| — | MF | SVK | Filip Deket |
| — | MF | BRA | Marcelo Da Silveira Pereira |
| — | FW | ESP | Mamadou Traoré Coulibaly |
| — | FW | SVK | Andrej Pekár |
| — | FW | SVK | Lukáš Fiantok |

== Coaching staff ==
As of 15 june 2023

| Staff | Job title |
|---|---|
| (Slovakia) Jozef Kozák | Manager (until 10 February) |
| (Slovakia) Dušan Borko | Manager (from 10 February) |
| (Slovakia) Jozef Kotula | Assistant manager |
| (Slovakia) Daniel Zaťko | Team Doctor |
| (Slovakia) Radovan Líška | Physiotherapist |
| (Slovakia) Lukáš Čurgali | Physiotherapist |

== Transfers and contracts ==
=== In ===
| Date from | Pos. | Nationality | Player | From | Fee | Ref. |
|---|---|---|---|---|---|---|
| 11 August 2022 | DF | (Slovakia) | Yaniv Edery | (Spain) Atletico Zabal Linense | Free | |
| 16 August 2022 | MF | (Slovakia) | Filip Deket | (Austria) USC Wallern | Free | |
| 26 August 2022 | FW | (Nigeria) | Opeyemi Shuaib Babalola | (Germany) Vatanspor Freising | Free | |
| 27 February 2023 | DF | (Slovakia) | Alex Húževka | (Austria) ASV Drassburg | Free | |
| 13 March 2023 | MF | (Slovakia) | Lukáš Ďuriš | (Austria) SV Münichreith | Free | |

=== Out ===
| Date from | Pos. | Nationality | Player | To | Fee | Ref. |
|---|---|---|---|---|---|---|
| 2 March 2023 | DF | (Slovakia) | Yaniv Edery | (Moldova) FC Sfîntul Gheorghe | Free | |

=== Loans in ===
| Date from | Pos. | Nationality | Player | From | Until | Ref. |
|---|---|---|---|---|---|---|
| 12 August 2022 | DF | (Slovakia) | Jozef Kotula | (Slovakia) TJ Slovan Čeľadice | 30 June 2023 | |
| 12 August 2022 | FW | (Slovakia) | Tomáš Sedlák | (Slovakia) OFK Bučany | 30 June 2023 | |
| 13 August 2022 | FW | (Slovakia) | Radovan Lipovský | (Slovakia) FK Lokomotíva Trnava | 30 July 2023 | |
| 13 August 2022 | DF | (Slovakia) | Miloš Ševčík | (Slovakia) FC Spartak Trnava | 30 July 2023 | |
| 13 August 2022 | DF | (Slovakia) | Kevin Daniel | (Slovakia) FC Spartak Trnava | 30 July 2023 | |
| 13 August 2022 | DF | (Slovakia) | Matej Hodulík | (Slovakia) TJ Iskra - Horné Orešany | 30 July 2023 | |
| 13 August 2022 | MF | (Slovakia) | Miroslav Sedlák | (Slovakia) ŠK Blava | 30 June 2023 | |
| 13 August 2022 | DF | (Slovakia) | Ján Lošonský | (Slovakia) ŠK Blava | 30 June 2023 | |
| 17 August 2022 | DF | (Slovakia) | Peter Hornák | (Slovakia) SC Čenkovce | 30 July 2023 | |
| 20 August 2022 | MF | (Brazil) | Lucas Tuma Correa | (Slovakia) FC Neded | 30 June 2023 | |
| 6 February 2023 | MF | (Ukraine) | Vadym Ferentsyk | (Slovakia) FK Marcelová | 30 July 2023 | |
| 13 February 2023 | MF | (Slovakia) | Ivan Polák | (Slovakia) FC Spartak Trnava | 30 July 2023 | |
| 25 February 2023 | GK | (Slovakia) | Šimon Horvát | (Slovakia) MFK Vrbové | 30 July 2023 | |
| 31 March 2023 | DF | (Slovakia) | Kristián Polák | (Slovakia) ŠK Váhovce | 30 July 2023 | |

=== Loans out ===
| Date from | Pos. | Nationality | Player | To | Until | Ref. |
|---|---|---|---|---|---|---|
| 10 July 2022 | DF | (Slovakia) | Tomáš Tvrdý | (Slovakia) FC Slovan Galanta | 30 June 2023 | |
| 17 July 2022 | FW | (Slovakia) | Lukáš Fiantok | (Slovakia) OFK Baník Lehota pod Vtáčnikom | 30 June 2023 | |
| 13 March 2023 | FW | (Spain) | Mamadou Traoré Coulibaly | (Slovakia) TJ JEDNOTA Bánová | 30 June 2023 | |
| 30 March 2023 | MF | (Slovakia) | Filip Deket | (Slovakia) OFK Bučany | 30 June 2023 | |

== Competitions ==
=== 4. liga ===
==== League table (Western Group) ====
| Pos | Team | Pld | W | D | L | GF | GA | GD | Pts | Qualification or relegation |
|---|---|---|---|---|---|---|---|---|---|---|
| 1 | OFK Baník Lehota pod Vtáčnikom (C, P) | 30 | 20 | 4 | 6 | 90 | 25 | +65 | 64 | Promotion to 3. Liga |
| 2 | ŠK 1923 Gabčíkovo | 30 | 18 | 5 | 7 | 60 | 29 | +31 | 59 | |
| 3 | ŠK LR CRYSTAL | 30 | 16 | 7 | 7 | 71 | 33 | +38 | 55 | |
| 4 | TJ Slavoj Boleráz | 30 | 14 | 10 | 6 | 58 | 38 | +20 | 52 | |
| 5 | FC Pata | 30 | 13 | 11 | 6 | 56 | 33 | +23 | 50 | |
| 6 | OFK Trebatice | 30 | 14 | 5 | 11 | 56 | 42 | +14 | 47 | |
| 7 | TJ Imeľ | 30 | 14 | 4 | 12 | 51 | 45 | +6 | 46 | |
| 8 | FC ViOn Zlaté Moravce – Vráble B | 30 | 13 | 5 | 12 | 54 | 41 | +13 | 44 | |
| 9 | TJ Nafta Gbely | 30 | 13 | 5 | 12 | 48 | 44 | +4 | 44 | |
| 10 | ŠK Blava 1928 | 30 | 13 | 4 | 13 | 50 | 40 | +10 | 43 | |
| 11 | MŠK Hurbanovo | 30 | 11 | 6 | 13 | 42 | 34 | +8 | 39 | |
| 12 | FK TJ Lokomotíva Kozárovce | 30 | 10 | 6 | 14 | 52 | 62 | −10 | 36 | |
| 13 | FK Slovan Levice | 30 | 12 | 2 | 16 | 39 | 54 | −15 | 35 | |
| 14 | FC Nitra | 30 | 8 | 6 | 16 | 37 | 51 | −14 | 30 | |
| 15 | FK Kolárovo (R) | 30 | 6 | 5 | 19 | 25 | 69 | −44 | 23 | Relegation to 5. Liga |
| 16 | FK Marcelová (R) | 30 | 2 | 1 | 27 | 10 | 159 | −149 | 4 | Relegation to 5. Liga |

Updated to match(es) played on unknown. Source: Sportnet
(C) Champions; (P) Promoted; (R) Relegated

Note: FK Slovan Levice and FK Marcelová were deducted three points each for failing to meet their financial obligations.

==== Matches ====
Win Draw Loss Fixtures

| 6 August 2022 1 | ŠK LR Crystal | w/o | FC Nitra | Lednické Rovne |
| 17:00 CEST | | Report | | Stadium: Lednické Rovne Stadium |
Note: The match was awarded as a 3–0 walkover victory to ŠK LR Crystal after FC Nitra failed to turn up for the match.

| 14 August 2022 2 | FC Nitra | 1–1 | ŠK 1923 Gabčíkovo | Nitra |
| 17:00 CEST | Lipovský 61' | Report | Bertalan 7' | Stadium: Štadión pod Zoborom; Attendance: 250 |

| 21 August 2022 3 | FC Pata | 2–1 | FC Nitra | Pata |
| 17:00 CEST | Valenta 4'; Lomen 73' | Report | Sedlák 43' | Stadium: Pata Stadium; Attendance: 600 |

| 28 August 2022 4 | FC Nitra | 0–2 | TJ Nafta Gbely | Nitra |
| 17:00 CEST | | Report | Bohun 52', 63' | Stadium: Štadión pod Zoborom; Attendance: 100 |

| 4 September 2022 5 | ViOn Zlaté Moravce - Vráble B | 4-0 | FC Nitra | Vráble |
| 16:00 CEST | | Report | Niarchos 33', 35', 49' (pen.); Grác 85' | Stadium: Štadión Vráble; Attendance: 270 |

| 10 September 2022 6 | FC Nitra | 0-4 | Baník Lehota pod Vtáčnikom | Nitra |
| 12:00 CEST | | Report | Matuškovič 31', 70', 89'; Kosorín 72'; Bublák 82' | Stadium: Štadión pod Zoborom; Attendance: 180 |

| 18 September 2022 7 | TJ Imeľ | 1-0 | FC Nitra | Imeľ |
| 16:00 CEST | Straňák 76' | Report | | Stadium: Futbalový štadión TJ Imeľ; Attendance: 267 |

| 25 September 2022 8 | FC Nitra | 1-2 | FK Slovan Levice | Nitra |
| 15:00 CEST | Lipovský 60' | Report | Kupča 52'; Petrík 70' | Stadium: Štadión pod Zoborom; Attendance: 100 |

| 1 October 2022 9 | FK Marcelová | 0-6 | FC Nitra | Marcelová |
| 14:30 CEST | | Report | Mori 6'; Hodulík 31', 47'; Sedlák 48'; Lipovský 74'; Correa 48' | Stadium: Futbalový štadión FK Marcelová; Attendance: 80 |

| 9 October 2022 10 | FC Nitra | 4-0 | FK Kolárovo | Nitra |
| 14:30 CEST | Mori 10'; Hodulík 29', 40'; Pekár 82' | Report | | Stadium: Štadión pod Zoborom; Attendance: 150 |

| 16 October 2022 11 | FK TJ Lokomotíva Kozárovce | 5-2 | FC Nitra | Kozárovce |
| 14:00 CEST | Daniel 2' (o.g.); Drienovský 8', 44', 78'; Štefanka 82' | Report | Lipovský 10', 11' | Stadium: Stadium Kozárovce; Attendance: 100 |

| 23 October 2022 12 | FC Nitra | 4-4 | OFK Trebatice | Nitra |
| 14:00 CEST | Sedlák 6' (pen.); Lošonský 15'; Lipovský 30'; Correa 82' | Report | Poláček 38'; Masár 72' (pen.) | Stadium: Štadión pod Zoborom; Attendance: 100 |

| 30 October 2022 13 | MŠK Hurbanovo | 3-0 | FC Nitra | Hurbanovo |
| 14:00 CET | | Report | Szántó 19' (pen.); Csomor 71'; Kalmár 77' (pen.) | Stadium: Stadium Hurbanovo; Attendance: 200 |

| 6 November 2022 14 | FC Nitra | 1-1 | TJ Slavoj Boleráz | Nitra |
| 13:30 CET | Sedlák 67' | Report | Kotula 28' (o.g.) | Stadium: Štadión pod Zoborom; Attendance: 283 |

| 12 November 2022 15 | ŠK Blava | 2-0 | FC Nitra | Jaslovské Bohunice |
| 13:30 CET | Dvorák 36'; Horváth 86' | Report | | Stadium: Štadión Jaslovské Bohunice; Attendance: 141 |

| 11 March 2023 16 | FC Nitra | 0-1 | ŠK LR CRYSTAL | Nitra |
| 14:30 CET | | Report | Lipták 60' (pen.) | Stadium: Štadión pod Zoborom; Attendance: 120 |

| 19 March 2023 17 | ŠK 1923 Gabčíkovo | 1-1 | FC Nitra | Gabčíkovo |
| 15:00 CET | Zsigmond 78' (pen.) | Report | Hodulík 11' | Stadium: Stadium Gabčíkovo; Attendance: 100 |

| 25 March 2023 18 | FC Nitra | 2-2 | FC Pata | Nitra |
| 15:00 CET | Sedlák 13' (pen.); Correa 83' | Report | Herák 15' (pen.); Polakovič 87' | Stadium: Štadión pod Zoborom; Attendance: 150 |

| 2 April 2023 19 | TJ Nafta Gbely | 2-1 | FC Nitra | Gbely |
| 15:30 CEST | Smolinský 29'; Ligás 69' | Report | Hodulík 60' | Stadium: Stadium Gbely; Attendance: 100 |

| 8 April 2023 20 | FC Nitra | 1-0 | ViOn Zlaté Moravce - Vráble B | Nitra |
| 15:30 CEST | Correa 69' | Report | | Stadium: Štadión pod Zoborom; Attendance: 105 |

| 15 April 2023 21 | Baník Lehota pod Vtáčnikom | 3-0 | FC Nitra | Lehota pod Vtáčnikom |
| 16:00 CEST | Sibanda 61'; Stovička 77'; Januška 79' | Report | | Stadium: Futbalový štadión OFK Baník; Attendance: 250 |

| 23 April 2023 22 | FC Nitra | 1-2 | TJ Imeľ | Nitra |
| 16:00 CEST | Ďuriš 90' (pen.) | Report | Shyrokov 45'; Csontos (yellow card) 66' | Stadium: Štadión pod Zoborom; Attendance: 65 |

| 30 April 2023 23 | FK Slovan Levice | 0-1 | FC Nitra | Levice |
| 16:00 CEST | | Report | Fiantok 69' | Stadium: Futbalový štadión Levice; Attendance: 200 |

| 7 May 2023 24 | FC Nitra | 2-1 | FK Marcelová | Nitra |
| 16:30 CEST | Fiantok 62'; Sedlák 90' | Report | Gumbér 83' | Stadium: Štadión pod Zoborom; Attendance: 100 |

| 13 May 2023 25 | FK Kolárovo | 0-1 | FC Nitra | Kolárovo |
| 16:30 CEST | | Report | Lošonský 57' | Stadium: Štadion Kolomana Gőgha; Attendance: 100 |

| 21 May 2023 26 | FC Nitra | 1-1 | FK TJ Lokomotíva Kozárovce | Nitra |
| 17:00 CEST | Sedlák 78' | Report | Bíňovský 60' | Stadium: Štadión pod Zoborom; Attendance: 90 |

| 28 May 2023 27 | OFK Trebatice | 1-0 | FC Nitra | Trebatice |
| 17:00 CEST | Bartošek 90' | Report | | Stadium: Futbalové ihrisko Attendance: 150 |

| 3 June 2023 28 | FC Nitra | 3-0 | MŠK Hurbanovo | Nitra |
| 17:00 CEST | Ďuriš 12' (pen.); Fiantok 20'; Radovan LipovskýLipovský 68' | Report | | Stadium: Štadión pod Zoborom; Attendance: 100 |

| 14 June 2023 29 | TJ Slavoj Boleráz | 2-1 | FC Nitra | Boleráz |
| 17:00 CEST | Planeta 25'; Hlavna 74' | Report | Hlavna 26' (o.g.) | Stadium: Futbalový štadión TJ Slavoj Boleráz; Attendance: 100 |

| 17 June 2023 30 | FC Nitra | 2-1 | ŠK Blava | Nitra |
| 17:00 CEST | Ďuriš 27'; Ferentsyk 72' | Report | Minarovič 21' | Stadium: Štadión pod Zoborom; Attendance: 100 |

== Statistics ==
=== Goalscorers ===
| Rank | No. | Pos. | Nat. | Player | 4. Liga | Total |
|---|---|---|---|---|---|---|
| 1 | 11 | FW | (Slovakia) | Radovan Lipovský | 7 | 7 |
| 2 | 6 | DF | (Slovakia) | Matej Hodulík | 6 | 6 |
| 2 | 7 | DF | (Slovakia) | Miroslav Sedlák | 6 | 6 |
| 3 | 13 | MF | (Brazil) | Lucas Tuma Correa | 4 | 4 |
| 4 | | FW | (Slovakia) | Lukáš Fiantok | 3 | 3 |
| 4 | 9 | MF | (Slovakia) | Lukáš Ďuriš | 3 | 3 |
| 5 | 15 | DF | (Slovakia) | Ján Lošonský | 2 | 2 |
| 5 | 3 | DF | (Slovakia) | Matúš Mori | 2 | 2 |
| 6 | | FW | (Slovakia) | Andrej Pekár | 1 | 1 |
| 6 | 10 | FW | (Slovakia) | Tomáš Sedlák | 1 | 1 |
| 6 | 8 | MF | (Ukraine) | Vadym Ferentsyk | 1 | 1 |
| Own goals | | | | | 1 | 1 |
| Totals | | | | | 37 | 37 |
