= 2024–25 FC Nitra season =

Slovak football club season

FC Nitra
2024–25 season
- Owner: FC Nitra a. s.
- Chairman: Milan Lenčéš (until 11 September); Pavol Ondriš (from 11 September)
- Head Coach: Miloš Foltán (until 15 November); Igor Slezák (from 15 November)
- Stadium: Štadión pod Zoborom, Nitra
- 4. Liga: 13th
- Slovak Cup: First round
- Top goalscorer: League: Ján Nemčok (7); All: Ján Nemčok (7)
- Highest home attendance: 620 vs TJ Slavoj Boleráz (4. Liga, 10 August 2024)
- Lowest home attendance: 150 vs AFC Nové Mesto (4. Liga, 9 November 2024)
- Biggest win: 6–0 vs FK Slovan Levice (4. Liga, 19 April 2025)
- Biggest defeat: 0–3 vs ŠK Šoporňa (4. Liga, 12 October 2024)
Home colours	Away colours	Third colours

The 2024–25 season was FC Nitra's second season in the fourth tier of Slovak football. The club finished 13th in the league and also competed in the Slovak Cup, where it was eliminated in the first round. A new investor joined the club during the season, resulting in a significant turnover of players in the first-team squad.

FC Nitra did not compete in the 2023–24 season after the senior team was withdrawn from the competition following the declaration of bankruptcy by the District Court in Nitra. However, the Regional Court in Nitra overturned the decision, allowing the club to compete in the 2024–25 season.

== First-team squad ==
As of 15 june 2025

Note: Flags indicate national team as defined under FIFA eligibility rules; some limited exceptions apply. Players may hold more than one non-FIFA nationality.

No.	Pos.	Nation	Player
1	GK	SVK	Erik Trautenberger
1	GK	SVK	Denis Chudý
2	MF	SVK	Adam Gašparík
2	MF	SVK	Filip Danek
3	GK	SVK	Dávid Bobček
3	MF	COL	Jaime Andres Gamboa Cayola
4	DF	SVK	Lukáš Michaleje
5	DF	BRA	Victor Hugo Da Silva
6	MF	SVK	Tomáš Kurti
6	MF	SVK	Vladimír Pilník
7	MF	SVK	Erik Mikeš
7	MF	SVK	Patrik Peťovský
7	MF	SVK	Philippe Schmidt
8	MF	SVK	Ján Nemčok
9	MF	SVK	Ľuboš Janek
9	FW	SVK	Boris Bruckner
10	MF	BRA	Ruan Jodi Lucio Madeiros
10	FW	SVK	Jozef Sombat
11	MF	SVK	Adam Gašparík
11	MF	SVK	Marko Bača
11	MF	SVK	Frederik Domasta
12	MF	COL	Samuel Perez Aponte
13	MF	SVK	Jakub Kočí
14	DF	SVK	Pavol Grác
14	DF	SVK	Jozef Kotula (captain)

No.	Pos.	Nation	Player
15	MF	SVK	Adam Barborík
15	MF	SVK	Maximilian Kubička
16	MF	SVK	Artur Záhon
16	DF	SVK	Peter Málek
17	DF	SVK	Marko Ševčík
17	MF	SVK	Peter Patrik Flašík
17	MF	SVK	Ján Lošonský
18	MF	SVK	Patrik Peťovský
18	FW	SVK	Matúš Loskot
19	DF	SVK	Dominik Krajinčák
20	MF	SVK	Adrián Mokoš
22	DF	GHA	Kojo Amankwaa
22	GK	SVK	Tomáš Krištof
24	DF	SVK	Martin Januška
25	MF	SVK	Lukáš Štrauch
27	DF	SVK	Adam Dunda
71	GK	UKR	Myroslav Mahurskyy
—	GK	SVK	Adam Kováč
—	DF	SVK	Timotej Matušica
—	MF	ESA	Fernando Carlos Cortez Rivera
—	MF	SVK	Jonáš Oršula
—	MF	BRA	Andre Lopes Siqueira
—	FW	ESP	Emilio Manuel Tenacio Parron

== Coaching staff ==
As of 15 june 2025

Staff	Job title
(Slovakia) Miloš Foltán	Manager (until 15 November)
(Slovakia) Igor Slezák	Manager (from 15 November)
(Slovakia) Jozef Kotula	Assistant manager
(Slovakia) Patrik Brezina	Goalkeeping coach
(Slovakia) Jozef Kučera	Team Doctor
(Slovakia) Radovan Líška	Physiotherapist
(Slovakia) Lukáš Čurgali	Physiotherapist

== Transfers and contracts ==
=== In ===
Date from	Pos.	Nationality	Player	From	Fee	Ref.
11 July 2024	DF	(Slovakia)	Jozef Kotula	(Slovakia) TJ Slovan Čeľadice	Free	
11 July 2024	MF	(Slovakia)	Maximilian Kubička	(Slovakia) TJ Slovan Červeník	Free	
11 July 2024	GK	(Slovakia)	Dávid Bobček	(Slovakia) FC Volkswagen Bratislava	Free	
11 July 2024	MF	(Slovakia)	Patrik Peťovský	(Slovakia) FC Slovan Hlohovec	Free	
11 July 2024	MF	(Slovakia)	Peter Patrik Flašík	(Slovakia) FC DAC 1904 Dunajská Streda	Free	
11 July 2024	DF	(Brazil)	Victor Hugo Da Silva	(Slovakia) OFK Kolíňany	Free	
19 July 2024	MF	(Slovakia)	Jakub Kočí	(Slovakia) FC Slovan Hlohovec	Free	
19 July 2024	MF	(Slovakia)	Marek Vitek	(Slovakia) OFK Trebatice	Free	
19 July 2024	MF	(Colombia)	Samuel Perez Aponte	(Slovakia) AC Nitra	Free	
20 July 2024	GK	(Slovakia)	Tomáš Krištof	(Slovakia) FK Slovan Duslo Šaľa	Free	
20 July 2024	DF	(Slovakia)	Dominik Krajinčák	(Slovakia) FC Slovan Hlohovec	Free	
23 July 2024	GK	(Slovakia)	Erik Trautenberger	(Slovakia) FC Slovan Hlohovec	Free	
23 July 2024	MF	(Slovakia)	Adam Gašparík	(Slovakia) ŠK Kmeťovo	Free	
2 August 2024	MF	(Slovakia)	Marko Bača	(Slovakia) FC ŠTK 1914 Šamorín	Free	
8 August 2024	MF	(Slovakia)	Ján Lošonský	(Austria) SV Erlauf	Free	
8 August 2024	FW	(Slovakia)	Matúš Loskot	(Austria) SV Erlauf	Free	
5 September 2024	MF	(El Salvador)	Fernando Carlos Cortez Rivera	(El Salvador) C.D. Dragón	Free	
26 September 2024	MF	(Brazil)	Andre Lopes Siqueira	(Brazil) Aguia FC	Free	
30 September 2024	GK	(Slovakia)	Adam Kováč	(Czech Republic) 1. SC Znojmo FK	Free	
17 January 2025	FW	(Slovakia)	Jozef Sombat	(Austria) SC Kittsee	Free	
21 January 2025	MF	(Slovakia)	Tomáš Kurti	(Slovakia) TJ Jarovce Bratislava	Free	
23 January 2025	MF	(Colombia)	Jaime Andres Gamboa Cayola	(Slovakia) OFK Trebatice	Free	
10 February 2025	MF	(Slovakia)	Frederik Domasta	(Slovakia) TJ Družstevník Veľké Ludince	Free	
10 February 2025	MF	(Slovakia)	Ľuboš Janek	(Slovakia) TJ Družstevník Veľké Ludince	Free	
18 February 2025	DF	(Slovakia)	Marko Ševčík	(Czech Republic) SK Uničov	Free	
21 February 2025	DF	(Slovakia)	Adam Dunda	(Czech Republic) FK Hodonín	Free	
21 February 2025	MF	(Slovakia)	Adrián Mokoš	(Slovakia) FK Slavoj Trebišov	Free	
23 March 2025	DF	(Ghana)	Kojo Amankwaa	(Ghana) Nations Football Club	Free	

=== Out ===
Date from	Pos.	Nationality	Player	To	Fee	Ref.
8 January 2025	DF	(Brazil)	Victor Hugo Da Silva	(Slovakia) Slovan Chrenová	Free	
4 February 2025	MF	(Slovakia)	Adam Gašparík	(Slovakia) OŠK Lipová	Free	
18 February 2025	GK	(Slovakia)	Adam Kováč	(Tajikistan) FC Vakhsh	Free	

=== Loans in ===
Date from	Pos.	Nationality	Player	From	Until	Ref.
20 July 2024	MF	(Slovakia)	Vladimír Pilník	(Slovakia) FK Pohronie	30 June 2025	
26 July 2024	MF	(Slovakia)	Ján Nemčok	(Slovakia) FC ViOn Zlaté Moravce	30 June 2025	
26 July 2024	DF	(Slovakia)	Peter Málek	(Slovakia) FC ViOn Zlaté Moravce	30 June 2025	
1 August 2024	MF	(Slovakia)	Philippe Schmidt	(Slovakia) TJ Žiara Horná Štubňa	30 June 2025	
20 September 2024	MF	(Slovakia)	Timotej Matušica	(Slovakia) FK Slovan Duslo Šaľa	30 June 2025	
28 September 2024	MF	(Slovakia)	Jonáš Oršula	(Slovakia) FC ViOn Zlaté Moravce	30 June 2025	
10 January 2025	DF	(Slovakia)	Pavol Grác	(Slovakia) FC ViOn Zlaté Moravce	30 June 2025	
13 January 2025	MF	(Slovakia)	Erik Mikeš	(Slovakia) FC Slovan Galanta	30 June 2025	
15 January 2025	DF	(Slovakia)	Lukáš Michaleje	(Slovakia) MFK Zvolen	30 June 2025	
23 January 2025	GK	(Slovakia)	Denis Chudý	(Slovakia) TJ AC Žabokreky nad Nitrou	30 June 2025	
29 January 2025	MF	(Slovakia)	Adam Barborík	(Slovakia) TJ Štart Nitrianske Hrnčiarovce	30 June 2025	
5 February 2025	MF	(Slovakia)	Lukáš Štrauch	(Slovakia) FK Tempo Partizánske	30 June 2025	
10 February 2025	DF	(Slovakia)	Martin Januška	(Slovakia) FK Baník Lehota pod Vtáčnikom	30 June 2025	
10 February 2025	GK	(Ukraine)	Myroslav Mahurskyy	(Slovakia) 1. FC Tatran Prešov	30 June 2025	
3 March 2025	MF	(Slovakia)	Artur Záhon	(Slovakia) ŠK Slovan Bratislava	30 June 2025	

=== Loans out ===
Date from	Pos.	Nationality	Player	To	Until	Ref.
31 January 2025	MF	(Colombia)	Samuel Perez Aponte	(Slovakia) TJ Štart Nitrianske Hrnčiarovce	30 June 2025	

== Friendlies ==
Win Draw Loss

=== Pre-season ===
21 July 2024 Friendly	FC Nitra	0–4	FKM Nové Zámky	Nitra
10:00 CEST				Stadium: Štadión pod Zoborom

=== Mid-season ===
19 January 2025 Friendly	FC Nitra	1–0	FK Ladomerská Vieska	Nitra
14:00 CET				Stadium: Štadión pod Zoborom

25 January 2025 Friendly	FC Nitra	1–1	Slovan Duslo Šaľa	Nitra
13:00 CET				Stadium: Štadión pod Zoborom

2 February 2025 Friendly	FC Nitra	3–0	FKM Nové Zámky	Nitra
13:00 CET				Stadium: Štadión pod Zoborom; Attendance: 200

8 February 2025 Friendly	FC Nitra	1–0	Slovan Hlohovec	Nitra
14:00 CET				Stadium: Štadión pod Zoborom

16 February 2025 Friendly	FC Nitra	8–1	Lokomotíva Bánov	Nitra
14:00 CET				Stadium: Štadión pod Zoborom

22 February 2025 Friendly	FC Nitra	1–0	FK Podkonice	Nitra
18:00 CET				Stadium: Štadión pod Zoborom

== Competitions ==
=== 4. liga ===
==== League table (Western Group) ====
Pos	Team	Pld	W	D	L	GF	GA	GD	Pts	Qualification or relegation
1	FC Baník Prievidza (C, P)	32	22	4	6	67	36	+31	70	Promotion to 3. liga
2	ŠK 1923 Gabčíkovo (P)	32	19	7	6	45	25	+20	64	Promotion to 3. liga
3	TJ Slavoj Boleráz	32	19	4	9	62	34	+28	61	
4	Spartak Dubnica	32	17	9	6	48	25	+23	60	
5	TJ Imeľ	32	17	7	8	63	39	+24	58	
6	FC Pata	32	13	11	8	54	44	+10	50	
7	ŠK LR CRYSTAL	32	12	10	10	51	42	+9	46	
8	OŠK Trenčianske Stankovce	32	12	7	13	49	48	+1	43	
9	PFK Piešťany	32	12	7	13	43	44	−1	43	
10	TJ Nafta Gbely	32	11	6	15	44	56	−12	39	
11	ŠK Šoporňa	32	12	3	17	38	56	−18	39	
12	ŠK Blava	32	9	9	14	31	49	−18	36	
13	FC Nitra	32	8	10	14	42	44	−2	34	
14	FK Slovan Levice	32	9	4	19	27	59	−32	31	
15	OFK Trebatice	32	8	5	19	33	65	−32	29	
16	AFC Nové Mesto	32	7	6	19	34	47	−13	27	
17	ViOn Zlaté Moravce B (R)	32	5	11	16	34	52	−18	26	Relegation to 5. liga

Updated to match(es) played on unknown. Source: Sportnet
(C) Champions; (P) Promoted; (R) Relegated

==== Matches ====
Win Draw Loss Fixtures

4 August 2024 1	TJ Imeľ	1–0	FC Nitra	Imeľ
17:00 CEST	Papuk 84'	Report		Stadium: Futbalový štadión TJ Imeľ; Attendance: 200

10 August 2024 2	FC Nitra	2–2	TJ Slavoj Boleráz	Nitra
17:00 CEST	Nemčok 49'; Schmidt 84'	Report	Martinka 18', 43'	Stadium: Štadión pod Zoborom; Attendance: 620

14 August 2024 16	ŠK LR CRYSTAL	3-2	FC Nitra	Lednické Rovne
17:00 CET	Mitáš 11'; Krajčo 25'; Púček 90'	Report	Loskot 58'; Bruckner 71'	Stadium: Lednické Rovne Stadium; Attendance: 200
Note: This match was played earlier by mutual agreement between the clubs.

17 August 2024 3	PFK Piešťany	3–1	FC Nitra	Piešťany
17:00 CEST	Lošonský 11' (o.g.); Strelec 53'; Ferenčík 74'	Report	Madeiros 61'	Stadium: PFK Piešťany stadium Attendance: 400

24 August 2024 4	FC Nitra	1–0	OFK Trebatice	Nitra
17:00 CEST	Madeiros 86'	Report		Stadium: Štadión pod Zoborom; Attendance: 250

1 September 2024 5	OŠK Trenčianske Stankovce	1-1	FC Nitra	Trenčianske Stankovce
16:00 CEST	Vaško 7' (pen.)	Report	Krajinčák 65'	Stadium: Oddychové centrum Attendance: 150

7 September 2024 6	FC Nitra	3-3	TJ Nafta Gbely	Nitra
16:00 CEST	Loskot 5'; Parron 63'; Madeiros 90'	Report	Ciprys 4'; Kosorín 72'; Kleiber 79'	Stadium: Štadión pod Zoborom; Attendance: 200

21 September 2024 8	FC Nitra	2-2	ViOn Zlaté Moravce - Vráble B	Nitra
15:30 CEST	Bruckner 84', 90'	Report	Gerši 89', 90'	Stadium: Štadión pod Zoborom; Attendance: 200
Note: This match was played earlier by mutual agreement between the clubs.

25 September 2024 7	FK Slovan Levice	2-0	FC Nitra	Levice
16:00 CEST	Petrík 19', 60'	Report		Stadium: Futbalový štadión Levice; Attendance: 150

29 September 2024 9	ŠK Blava	2-0	FC Nitra	Jaslovské Bohunice
15:30 CEST	Machovič 50'; Minarovič 70'	Report		Stadium: Štadión Jaslovské Bohunice; Attendance: 200

5 October 2024 10	FC Nitra	1-1	ŠK 1923 Gabčíkovo	Nitra
15:00 CEST	Lošonský (penalty missed) 20; Parron (penalty missed) 51; Nemčok 53'	Report	Mpofu 38' (pen.)	Stadium: Štadión pod Zoborom; Attendance: 200

12 October 2024 11	ŠK Šoporňa	3-0	FC Nitra	Šoporňa
15:00 CEST	Ferenc 2'; Mészáros 21' (pen.); Benko 33'	Report		Stadium: Stadium Šoporňa; Attendance: 250

19 October 2024 12	FC Baník Prievidza	2-1	FC Nitra	Prievidza
14:30 CEST	Koryťák 45'; Babašta 53' (pen.)	Report	Loskot 83'	Stadium: Futbalový štadión Prievidza; Attendance: 206

26 October 2024 13	FC Nitra	0-1	Spartak Dubnica	Nitra
17:00 CET		Report	Rešetka 69'	Stadium: Štadión pod Zoborom; Attendance: 200

1 November 2024 14	v
Note: The club did not play in this round because the league had an odd number of teams.

9 November 2024 15	FC Nitra	0-1	AFC Nové Mesto	Nitra
17:00 CET		Report	Šebek 36'	Stadium: Štadión pod Zoborom; Attendance: 150

16 November 2024 17	FC Nitra	1-2	FC Pata	Nitra
17:00 CET	Nemčok 59'	Report	Peseky 5' (pen.); Valenta 45'	Stadium: Štadión pod Zoborom; Attendance: 320

1 March 2025 33	FC Nitra	1-1	ŠK LR CRYSTAL	Nitra
17:00 CEST	Ragula 16' (o.g.)	Report	Pleva 78'	Stadium: Štadión pod Zoborom; Attendance: 480
Note: This match was played earlier by mutual agreement between the clubs.

8 March 2025 18	FC Nitra	0-0	TJ Imeľ	Nitra
14:30 CET		Report		Stadium: Štadión pod Zoborom; Attendance: 429

22 March 2025 20	FC Nitra	3-1	PFK Piešťany	Nitra
15:00 CEST	Štrauch 6'; Janek 23', 52'	Report	Gula 86' (pen.)	Stadium: Štadión pod Zoborom; Attendance: 550
Note: This match was played earlier by mutual agreement between the clubs.

26 March 2025 19	TJ Slavoj Boleráz	0-1	FC Nitra	Boleráz
16:00 CEST		Report	Janek 76'	Stadium: Futbalový štadión TJ Slavoj Boleráz; Attendance: 140

29 March 2025 21	OFK Trebatice	2-6	FC Nitra	Trebatice
15:00 CEST	Kravárik 45' (pen.); Blaško 50'	Report	Nemčok 11' (pen.); Štrauch 13'; Mikeš 64'; Domasta 69'; Sombat 80', 81'	Stadium: Futbalové ihrisko Attendance: 150

5 April 2025 22	FC Nitra	0-2	OŠK Trenčianske Stankovce	Nitra
15:00 CEST		Report	Provazník 58'; Ďuráči (yellow card) 90'	Stadium: Štadión pod Zoborom; Attendance: 380

13 April 2025 23	TJ Nafta Gbely	0-4	FC Nitra	Gbely
15:30 CEST		Report	Mokoš 13', 71'; Sombat 80'; Záhon 89'	Stadium: Stadium Gbely; Attendance: 150

19 April 2025 24	FC Nitra	6-0	FK Slovan Levice	Nitra
14:00 CEST	Nemčok 40', 81'; Ševčík 44', 49'; Sombat 45', 71'	Report		Stadium: Štadión pod Zoborom; Attendance: 580

27 April 2025 25	ViOn Zlaté Moravce - Vráble B	0-0	FC Nitra	Vráble
16:00 CEST		Report		Stadium: Štadión Vráble; Attendance: 510

30 April 2025 34	FC Pata	1-1	FC Nitra	Pata
17:30 CEST	Lomen 49'	Report	Nemčok 65'	Stadium: Pata Stadium; Attendance: 550
Note: This match was played earlier by mutual agreement between the clubs.

3 May 2025 26	FC Nitra	2-1	ŠK Blava	Nitra
16:30 CEST	Domasta 3', 55'	Report	Hlavatovič 48'	Stadium: Štadión pod Zoborom; Attendance: 322

11 May 2025 27	ŠK 1923 Gabčíkovo	2-0	FC Nitra	Gabčíkovo
16:30 CEST	Oleksiuk 48'; Mpofu 82'	Report		Stadium: Stadium Gabčíkovo; Attendance: 375

17 May 2025 28	FC Nitra	1-0	ŠK Šoporňa	Nitra
17:00 CEST	Mokoš 82'	Report		Stadium: Štadión pod Zoborom; Attendance: 220

24 May 2025 29	FC Nitra	1-3	FC Baník Prievidza	Nitra
17:00 CEST	Štrauch 49'	Report	Babašta 7'; Balčirák 20', 31'	Stadium: Štadión pod Zoborom; Attendance: 200

31 May 2025 30	Spartak Dubnica	1-0	FC Nitra	Dubnica nad Váhom
17:00 CEST	Slávik 21'	Report		Stadium: Mestský futbalový štadión Attendance: 410

7 June 2025 31	v
Note: The club did not play in this round because the league had an odd number of teams.

14 June 2025 32	AFC Nové Mesto	1-1	FC Nitra	Nové Mesto nad Váhom
17:00 CEST	Kaman 61'	Report	Dunda 5'	Stadium: Areál AFC Považan; Attendance: 265

=== Slovak Cup ===
Win Loss Fixtures

27 July 2024 1R	Dolné Krškany	1–0 (5–4 p)	FC Nitra	Dolné Krškany
		Report		Stadium: Dolné Krškany Stadium; Attendance: 550

== Statistics ==
=== Goalscorers ===
Rank	No.	Pos.	Nat.	Player	4. Liga	Slovak Cup	Total
1	8	MF	(Slovakia)	Ján Nemčok	7	0	7
2	10	FW	(Slovakia)	Jozef Sombat	5	0	5
3	11	MF	(Slovakia)	Frederik Domasta	3	0	3
3	9	FW	(Slovakia)	Boris Bruckner	3	0	3
3	20	FW	(Slovakia)	Adrián Mokoš	3	0	3
3	25	MF	(Slovakia)	Lukáš Štrauch	3	0	3
3	18	FW	(Slovakia)	Matúš Loskot	3	0	3
3	10	MF	(Brazil)	Ruan Jodi Lucio Madeiros	3	0	3
3	9	MF	(Slovakia)	Ľuboš Janek	3	0	3
4	17	DF	(Slovakia)	Marko Ševčík	2	0	2
5	27	DF	(Slovakia)	Adam Dunda	1	0	1
5	16	MF	(Slovakia)	Artur Záhon	1	0	1
5	19	DF	(Slovakia)	Dominik Krajinčák	1	0	1
5		FW	(Spain)	Emilio Manuel Tenacio Parron	1	0	1
5	7	MF	(Slovakia)	Erik Mikeš	1	0	1
5	7	MF	(Slovakia)	Philippe Schmidt	1	0	1
Own goals					1	0	1
Totals					42	0	42
