= 2024–25 4. Liga (Slovakia) =

4. Liga
- Season: 2024–25
- Champions: MŠK Senec (Bratislava); FC Baník Prievidza (West); MFK Bytča (Middle); MFK Spartak Medzev (East)
- Promoted: MŠK Senec (Bratislava); FC Baník Prievidza; ŠK 1923 Gabčíkovo (West); MFK Bytča; TJ Tatran Oravské Veselé; MŠK Kysucké Nové Mesto (Middle); MFK Spartak Medzev; 1. MFK Kežmarok; MFK Slovan Sabinov; OFK SIM Raslavice (East)
- Relegated: SDM Domino; FK Slovan Most pri Bratislave (Bratislava); FC ViOn Zlaté Moravce - Vráble B (West); TJD Príbelce (Middle); 1. FK Svidník (East)

The 2024–25 season of 4. Liga was the 32rd season of the 4. Liga in Slovakia, since its establishment in 1993. Teams are geographically divided into four groups: Bratislava, West (Západ), Middle (Stred) and East (Východ). Teams are playing against teams in their own division only. The league was contested by 63 teams divided into four groups.

== Bratislava Group ==
This season of the fourth-tier league (Bratislava group) was won by MŠK Senec, who were thereby promoted to the third tier. Following the season, SDM Domino withdrew from the league and therefore did not continue in the following season. FK Slovan Most pri Bratislave finished in last place and were relegated to the 5. Liga.

=== League table ===
Pos	Team	Pld	W	D	L	GF	GA	GD	Pts	Promotion or relegation
1	MŠK Senec (C, P)	30	22	7	1	70	15	+55	73	Promotion to 3. Liga
2	FC Rohožník	30	17	7	6	67	40	+27	58	
3	FK Slovan Ivanka pri Dunaji	30	16	9	5	71	27	+44	57	
4	ŠK Tomášov	30	16	6	8	48	33	+15	54	
5	Nová Dedinka	30	16	5	9	42	28	+14	53	
6	TJ Rovinka	30	14	9	7	57	34	+23	51	
7	MFK Rusovce	30	14	8	8	63	37	+26	50	
8	ŠK Bernolákovo	30	14	7	9	39	32	+7	49	
9	PŠC Pezinok	30	10	8	12	40	56	−16	38	
10	NŠK 1922 Bratislava	30	8	8	14	31	49	−18	32	
11	OFK Dunajská Lužná	30	7	10	13	32	41	−9	31	
12	TJ Záhoran Jakubov	30	7	7	16	28	62	−34	28	
13	Lokomotíva Devínska Nová Ves	30	6	7	17	42	57	−15	25	
14	SDM Domino (W)	30	7	2	21	36	74	−38	23	Withdrawal of the first team from all competitions
15	FC Slovan Modra	30	4	10	16	26	56	−30	22	
16	FK Slovan Most pri Bratislave (R)	30	3	8	19	27	78	−51	17	Relegation to 5. Liga

Source: Sportnet
Rules for classification: 1) Points; 2) Goal difference; 3) Goals scored.
(C) Champions; (P) Promoted; (R) Relegated; (W) ?

== Western Group ==
This season of the fourth-tier league (Western group) was won by FC Baník Prievidza. The runners-up, ŠK 1923 Gabčíkovo, were also promoted to the third tier. The last-placed team, FC ViOn Zlaté Moravce - Vráble B, were relegated from the competition.

=== League table ===
Pos	Team	Pld	W	D	L	GF	GA	GD	Pts	Promotion or relegation
1	FC Baník Prievidza (C, P)	32	22	4	6	67	36	+31	70	Promotion to 3. Liga
2	ŠK 1923 Gabčíkovo (P)	32	19	7	6	45	25	+20	64	Promotion to 3. Liga
3	TJ Slavoj Boleráz	32	19	4	9	62	34	+28	61	
4	Spartak Dubnica	32	17	9	6	48	25	+23	60	
5	TJ Imeľ	32	17	7	8	63	39	+24	58	
6	FC Pata	32	13	11	8	54	44	+10	50	
7	ŠK LR CRYSTAL	32	12	10	10	51	42	+9	46	
8	OŠK Trenčianske Stankovce	32	12	7	13	49	48	+1	43	
9	PFK Piešťany	32	12	7	13	43	44	−1	43	
10	TJ Nafta Gbely	32	11	6	15	44	56	−12	39	
11	ŠK Šoporňa	32	12	3	17	38	56	−18	39	
12	ŠK Blava 1928	32	9	9	14	31	49	−18	36	
13	FC Nitra	32	8	10	14	42	44	−2	34	
14	FK Slovan Levice	32	9	4	19	27	59	−32	31	
15	OFK Trebatice	32	8	5	19	33	65	−32	29	
16	AFC Nové Mesto nad Váhom	32	7	6	19	34	47	−13	27	
17	FC ViOn Zlaté Moravce - Vráble B (R)	32	5	11	16	34	52	−18	26	Relegation to 5. Liga

Source: Sportnet
Rules for classification: 1) Points; 2) Goal difference; 3) Goals scored.
(C) Champions; (P) Promoted; (R) Relegated

== Middle Group ==
Three clubs were promoted from the Middle Group of the 4. Liga this season. MFK Bytča finished top of the table and were crowned champions, while TJ Tatran Oravské Veselé and MŠK Kysucké Nové Mesto were also promoted. TJD Príbelce finished bottom of the table and were relegated to the 5. Liga.

=== League table ===
Pos	Team	Pld	W	D	L	GF	GA	GD	Pts	Promotion or relegation
1	MFK Bytča (C, P)	26	17	5	4	63	18	+45	56	Promotion to 3. Liga
2	TJ Tatran Oravské Veselé (P)	26	15	7	4	45	22	+23	52	Promotion to 3. Liga
3	MŠK Kysucké Nové Mesto (P)	26	15	5	6	48	27	+21	50	Promotion to 3. Liga
4	ŠK Badín	26	13	6	7	50	32	+18	45	
5	ŠK Javorník Makov	26	12	6	8	43	38	+5	42	
6	OŠK Baník Stráňavy	26	12	1	13	32	47	−15	37	
7	TJ Sokol Zubrohlava	26	11	3	12	39	51	−12	36	
8	TJ Partizán Osrblie	26	9	7	10	49	53	−4	34	
9	FK Slávia Staškov	26	9	3	14	41	46	−5	30	
10	OŠK Bešeňová	26	8	5	13	33	46	−13	29	
11	TJ Sokol Medzibrod	26	7	7	12	39	46	−7	28	
12	ŠK Prameň Kováčová	26	7	5	14	28	49	−21	26	
13	FK Čadca	26	6	8	12	33	42	−9	26	
14	TJD Príbelce (R)	26	4	6	16	22	48	−26	18	Relegation to 5. Liga

Source: Sportnet
Rules for classification: 1) Points; 2) Goal difference; 3) Goals scored.
(C) Champions; (P) Promoted; (R) Relegated

== Eastern Group ==
In the Eastern Group of the 4. Liga, as many as four clubs were promoted to the 3. Liga this season. MFK Spartak Medzev finished in first place. The other promoted clubs were 1. MFK Kežmarok, MFK Slovan Sabinov and OFK SIM Raslavice. 1. FK Svidník left the league after withdrawing its A team from the competition during the season.

=== League table ===
Pos	Team	Pld	W	D	L	GF	GA	GD	Pts	Promotion or relegation
1	MFK Spartak Medzev (C, P)	28	21	3	4	95	24	+71	66	Promotion to 3. Liga
2	1. MFK Kežmarok (P)	28	18	6	4	69	23	+46	60	Promotion to 3. Liga
3	MFK Slovan Sabinov (P)	28	18	2	8	57	31	+26	56	Promotion to 3. Liga
4	OFK SIM Raslavice (P)	28	15	10	3	60	30	+30	55	Promotion to 3. Liga
5	FK Gerlachov	28	15	4	9	61	37	+24	49	
6	FK Čaňa	28	13	5	10	60	54	+6	44	
7	PWG Sokol Ľubotice	28	10	7	11	41	49	−8	37	
8	OŠK Pavlovce nad Uhom	28	10	5	13	43	66	−23	35	
9	MFK Rožňava	28	10	4	14	44	58	−14	34	
10	ŠK Záhradné	28	9	4	15	34	42	−8	31	
11	FK Kechnec	28	9	2	17	49	61	−12	29	
12	FK Sobrance-Sobranecko	28	7	7	14	34	51	−17	28	
13	OŠK Rudňany	28	7	6	15	34	69	−35	27	
14	MFK Veľký Šariš	28	6	5	17	34	91	−57	23	
15	MŠK Spartak Medzilaborce	28	4	6	18	44	73	−29	18	
16	1. FK Svidník (W)	0	0	0	0	0	0	0	0	Withdrawal of the first team from the competition

Source: Sportnet
Rules for classification: 1) Points; 2) Goal difference; 3) Goals scored.
(C) Champions; (P) Promoted; (W) ?
