= 2026–27 3. Liga (Slovakia) =

3. Liga
- Season: 2026–27

The 2026–27 3. Liga (Slovakia) is the 34th edition of the third tier 3. Liga since its establishment in 1993. 44 teams contested being divided into three geographic groups: 3. liga Západ (West), 3. liga Stred (Middle) and 3. liga Východ (East). The season began on 7 August 2026 and is scheduled to conclude on 6 June 2027.

The league consists of 44 clubs divided into three regional groups: West, Middle and East. Each group plays a double round-robin tournament. The winners are eligible for promotion to the 2. Liga, while the lowest-placed teams are relegated to the regional 4. Liga divisions, subject to the Slovak Football Association regulations.

== Západ (West) ==
MŠK Púchov were relegated from the 2. Liga, while OFK Dunajská Lužná and FC Nitra were promoted from the 4. Liga. All three clubs will compete in the 3. Liga during the 2026–27 season. Former national team player Miroslav Stoch will also play for FC Nitra this season.

=== League table ===
Pos	Team	Pld	W	D	L	GF	GA	GD	Pts	Promotion or relegation
1	FC Nitra	14	13	1	0	51	10	+41	40	Promotion to 2. Liga
2	Púchov	15	8	5	2	36	10	+26	29	
3	Dunajská Lužná	15	8	4	3	19	11	+8	28	
4	Beluša	15	6	6	3	32	24	+8	24	
5	DAC Dunajská Streda B	15	7	3	5	29	21	+8	24	
6	Myjava	14	6	4	4	25	19	+6	22	
7	Nové Zámky	14	6	3	5	20	19	+1	21	
8	Gabčíkovo	14	6	2	6	24	25	−1	20	
9	Senec	15	6	1	8	15	28	−13	19	
10	Častkovce	15	5	2	8	25	31	−6	17	
11	Trenčín B	15	5	2	8	27	29	−2	17	
12	Komárno B	15	5	2	8	19	36	−17	17	
13	Veľké Ludince	15	4	4	7	23	32	−9	16	
14	Prievidza	14	5	1	8	21	26	−5	16	
15	Rača	15	2	5	8	17	38	−21	11	Possible relegation to 4. Liga
16	Slovan Duslo Šaľa	14	1	3	10	8	32	−24	6	Relegation to 4. Liga

Source: sportnet.sme.sk
Rules for classification: 1) Points; 2) Head-to-head points; 3) Head-to-head goal difference; 4) Head-to-head away goals scored; 5) Play-off.

== Stred (Middle) ==
FK Čadca and TJ Sokol Medzibrod earned promotion from the 4. Liga and will compete in the 3. Liga during the 2026–27 season.

=== League table ===
Pos	Team	Pld	W	D	L	GF	GA	GD	Pts	Promotion or relegation
1	Ružomberok B	13	10	2	1	47	18	+29	32	Promotion to 2. Liga
2	Námestovo	13	10	1	2	33	14	+19	31	
3	Čadca	13	9	1	3	39	16	+23	28	
4	Martin	13	8	0	5	32	25	+7	24	
5	Fiľakovo	13	6	3	4	21	17	+4	21	
6	Podkonice	13	5	4	4	28	24	+4	19	
7	Rimavská Sobota	13	6	0	7	20	23	−3	18	
8	Kalinovo	13	5	2	6	15	25	−10	17	
9	Oravské Veselé	13	5	2	6	16	23	−7	17	
10	Lučenec	13	5	1	7	22	22	0	16	
11	Dukla Banská Bystrica B	13	3	3	7	11	22	−11	12	
12	Kysucké Nové Mesto	13	2	3	8	17	33	−16	9	
13	Medzibrod	13	2	2	9	12	36	−24	8	Possible relegation to 4. Liga
14	Dolný Kubín	13	1	4	8	11	26	−15	7	Relegation to 4. Liga

Source: sportnet.sme.sk
Rules for classification: 1) Points; 2) Head-to-head points; 3) Head-to-head goal difference; 4) Head-to-head away goals scored; 5) Play-off.

== Východ (East) ==
Stará Ľubovňa and Slávia TU Košice were relegated from the 2. Liga, while Partizán Bardejov BŠK earned promotion from the 4. Liga. All three clubs joined the 3. Liga for the 2026–27 season.

=== League table ===
Pos	Team	Pld	W	D	L	GF	GA	GD	Pts	Promotion or relegation
1	Lokomotíva Košice	13	8	3	2	22	8	+14	27	Promotion to 2. Liga
2	Raslavice	13	8	2	3	22	16	+6	26	
3	Medzev	13	8	2	3	27	18	+9	26	
4	Stará Ľubovňa	13	7	4	2	28	16	+12	25	
5	Tesla Stropkov	13	6	2	5	24	14	+10	20	
6	Bardejov	13	6	2	5	23	23	0	20	
7	Spišská Nová Ves	13	6	1	6	20	18	+2	19	
8	Slávia TU Košice	13	6	1	6	24	21	+3	19	
9	Odeva Lipany	13	5	3	5	24	20	+4	18	
10	Snina	13	4	5	4	15	18	−3	17	
11	Poprad	13	5	2	6	21	19	+2	17	
12	Vranov nad Topľou	13	4	2	7	14	29	−15	14	
13	Sabinov	13	1	4	8	4	19	−15	7	Possible relegation to 4. Liga
14	Kežmarok	13	0	1	12	7	36	−29	1	Relegation to 4. Liga

Source: sportnet.sme.sk
Rules for classification: 1) Points; 2) Head-to-head points; 3) Head-to-head goal difference; 4) Head-to-head away goals scored; 5) Play-off.
