= Milan Pavlović =

Milan Pavlović may refer to:

- Milan Pavlović (footballer) (born 1967), Serbian footballer
- Milan Pavlović (actor) (born 1970), Bosnian actor and TV personality

== See also ==
- Milan Pavlovič (born 1980), Slovak football
