= Imel =

Imel may refer to:

- Imeľ, a village in Komarno District in south Slovakia
- Jack Imel (1932–2017) of the Lawrence Welk Show
