= Dušan Kabát =

Slovak footballer (1944–2022)

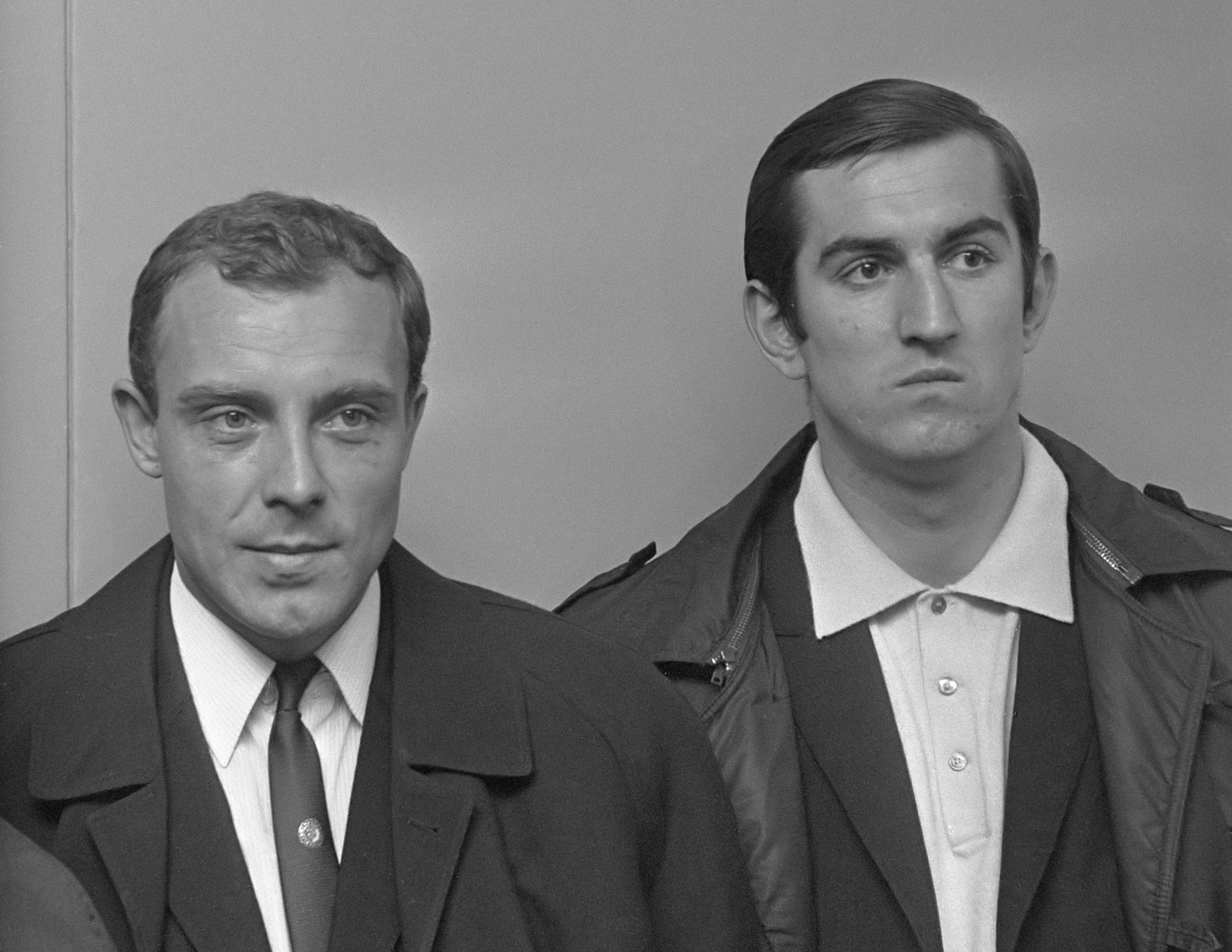
- Dušan Kabát (left) with Ladislav Kuna (1969)

Personal information
- Date of birth: 20 August 1944
- Place of birth: Sereď, Slovakia
- Date of death: 19 May 2022 (aged 77)
- Place of death: Prague, Czech Republic
- Positions: Midfielder; defender

Youth career
- 1955–1956: Lokomotíva Leopoldov
- 1957–1959: Slovan Piešťany
- 1959–1963: Spartak Trnava

Senior career*
Years	Team	Apps	(Gls)
1961–1963	Spartak Trnava	6	(0)
1963–1965	Dukla Prague	14	(5)
1965–1976	Spartak Trnava	277	(39)
1977–1978	Slovan Hlohovec		

International career
1964–1965	Czechoslovakia juniors	4	(0)
1965–1966	Czechoslovakia B	2	(0)
1965–1973	Czechoslovakia	24	(2)
- * Club domestic league appearances and goals

Dušan Kabát (20 August 1944 – 19 May 2022 in Prague) was a Slovak footballer who played first as a midfielder and later as a defender. He played for the Czechoslovakia national football team.

== Career ==
Born in Sereď, Kabát began playing football with TJ Leopoldov. In a career that spanned 1961 to 1976, he played for Slovan Piešťany, FC Spartak Trnava, FC Dukla Prague and FC Slovan Hlohovec. He appeared in 296 Czechoslovak league matches and scored 56 goals during his club career.

He made 24 appearances and scored two goals for the Czechoslovakia national football team.

After retiring, he became a coach.
