= Battle of Hetény-Kurtakeszi-Izsa =

Battle of the Hungarian War of Independence of 1848–1849

Coordinates: 47°45′36.8″N 18°15′18.1″E

- Part of the Hungarian Revolution of 1848
Date	10 September 1849
Location	near Hetény, Kurtakeszi (part of today Marcelová) and Izsa Kingdom of Hungary, today part of Slovakia
Result	Hungarian victory

Belligerents
Hungarian Revolutionary Army	Russian Empire

Commanders and leaders
Unknown	Unknown

Strength
1 battalion + 2 companies of infantry 1 hussar company 1/2 battery	2 infantry battalions 4 uhlan companies 12 cannons

Casualties and losses
Unknown	Unknown

The Battle of Hetény-Kurtakeszi-Izsa, fought on 10 September 1849 between a Hungarian troop from the Fortress of Komárom and a Russian detachment of Cossacks, was one of the last battles of the Hungarian War of Independence. The battle followed the Surrender at Világos by General Artúr Görgei, leader of the Hungarian army, on 13 August 1849. After this surrender, one of the last strongholds of Hungarian independence was the fortress of Komárom, which was then surrounded by Austrian and Russian troops. During September 1849, a number of smaller battles and skirmishes were fought between the Hungarian defenders and the Russian-Austrian besieging troops. The Russians and Austrians sought to tighten the blockade around the Hungarian fortress, in order to seize it by direct assault as soon as possible. Meanwhile, the Hungarians attempted to gain intelligence regarding the strength of the besieging troops. On 10 September, General György Klapka, the commander of the fortress, learned that the Russians had smaller units stationed northeast of Komárom. General Klapka sent a detachment to gather information, but unbeknownst to the Hungarians, the Russians had much superior forces, which compelled the Hungarians to retreat. The Russian forces tried to cut off the Hungarian retreat, but the Hungarians managed to repel them. As a result of this encounter, Klapka learned that the enemy forces surrounding Komárom were indeed vastly superior to his own forces. After a two-week armistice, various battles and skirmishes continued between the Hungarian troops and the Russian-Austrian besieging units.

== Background ==
In the final days of the Hungarian War of Independence of 1848–1849, after the Surrender at Világos on 13 August 1849 of the last operational army of the Hungarians led by General Artúr Görgei, and the political leader of the Hungarian Revolution, Lajos Kossuth having left the country on 17 August, there were still many units and fortresses which continued to resist. But in the next two weeks, most of these troops surrendered. At the start of September, only two strongholds remained in Hungarian hands: the fortresses of Pétervárad and Komárom. But on 7 September, General Pál Kiss surrendered the fortress of Pétervárad to the Austrians. So, the only fortress that continued to resist was Komárom.

The Military Council of Komárom Castle, convened by Klapka on 1 September, set forth terms for capitulation, which were as follows:

1. General amnesty for the whole nation.
2. General pardon, without distinction of nationality, for the whole Hungarian army, which has already laid down its arms or will lay down its arms in the future; and the immediate release of all Hungarian soldiers who have been taken prisoners of war.
3. The exchange of paper money issued by the Hungarian treasury for money of the empire.
4. Freedom for everybody to remain in the country or emigrate; the provision of the necessary passports for those going abroad.
5. The free departure of the defenders of Komárom, with a military parade.
6. A monthly fee for officers, and 10 days' pay for the commoners, in full value, both for those who remain in the country and for those who emigrate.
7. Retention of private property by all.
8. Exchange of approved copies of these terms of surrender within 8 days, i.e. by 8 September 1849. [?]
9. Complete pardon and no political persecution for the city of Komárom and its inhabitants, and exchange of all paper money issued by the governorate of the fortress during the siege.
10. Compensation of all those who have signed a contract with the commandment of Komárom castle.

On 2 September 1849, a two-week armistice concluded between the Austrian troops and the defenders of Komárom, expired, and a few days later the Habsburg Imperial-Royal (K.u.K.) and Russian troops drew a tight siege ring around the walls of the fortress.

Starting on 1 September, the command of the besieging army was taken over by Field Marshal Laval Nugent von Westmeath.

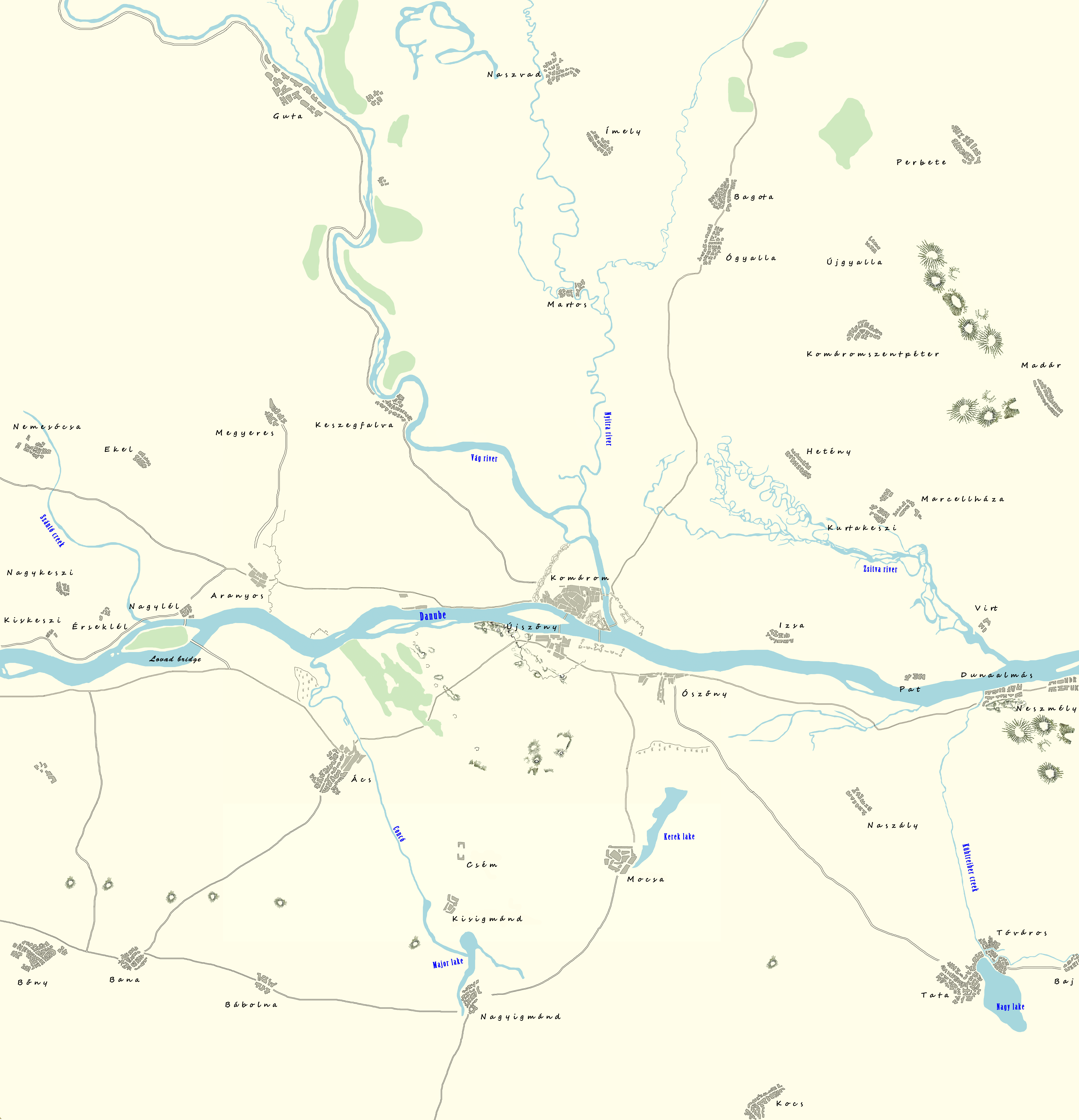
Map of Komárom and its surroundings in the middle of the 19th century, according to the Second military survey of the Habsburg Empire

The besieging troops were:

II Corps under Baron Lieutenant General Anton Csorich

- Colloredo division
  - Pott and Liebler brigades: 13 battalions, 4 companies of cavalry and 28 guns;
- Nobili division
  - Teuchert and Lederer Brigades: 10 1/3 battalions, 3 cavalry companies and 18 guns.

Corps total: 23 1/3 battalions, 7 cavalry companies and 46 guns.

II Reserve Corps under Field Marshal Count Laval Nugent

- Pálffy Division
  - Chizzola, Jablonowski and Alcaini brigades: 15 1/2 battalions, 4 1/2 cavalry companies and 24 guns;
- Burits division
  - Jablonski, Montenuovo, and Barco brigades: 9 battalions and 11 cavalry companies.

Corps total: 24 1/2 infantry battalions, 15 1/2 cavalry companies and 24 guns, plus the 84 guns of the artillery reserve.

Total for both corps: 47 5/6 infantry battalions, 22 1/2 cavalry companies (44,000 men and 5,446 horses), and 154 guns.

Russian detachment under Lieutenant General Pavel Grabbe

- 16 battalions, 22 cavalry companies (17,478 soldiers, 4989 horses), and 56 guns.

This brought the besieging forces to 61,478 men, 10,435 horses, and 210 cannon.

Colloredo's division took up a position at Csallóközaranyos in the Csallóköz and with its outposts occupied Szentpál, Örsújfalu (today both are a part of Komárno), and Nemesőrs, then Keszegfalva and Vízvár. The connection with the right bank of the Danube was assured at Pusztalovad by the Ceres steamship, and at Nagylél (today part of Csallóközaranyos), where a pontoon bridge was about to be constructed. From Nobili's division, the Teuchert brigade occupied Ács and the Ács forest, while the Lederer brigade Herkály occupied farm (Puszta-Herkály). The Jablonowski brigade was at Pusztacsém (Csém farm); the Chizzola division at Grebic and Billeg; the Jablonski brigade at Mocsa; while the Barco cavalry brigade was camped at Ács. The Russian detachment under Grabbe took up positions at Hetény, Kurtakeszi, and Komáromszentpéter. The besiegers started to rebuild their trenches and earthworks from the Ács forest, Csém, Herkály and Csallóköz, which had been destroyed by the Hungarians after they managed to relieve the fortress in the Battle of Komárom from 26 April 1849.

Hungarian defenders

- 26 infantry battalions, 6 cavalry companies: 26,300 men (of which 6000 were new recruits with little fighting value), 1300 horses, and 292 cannon (the majority being the fortress's defense guns).

== Prelude ==
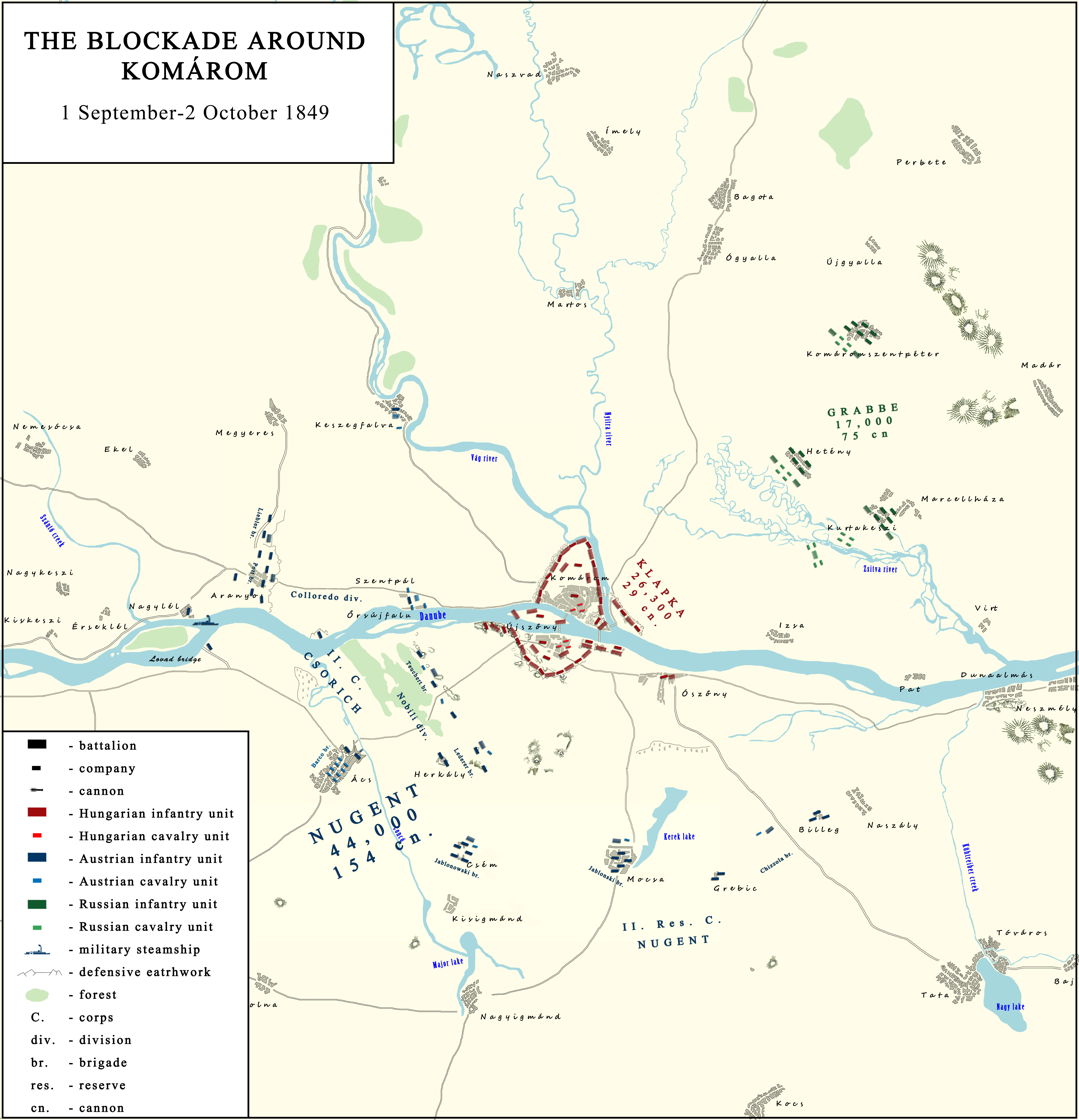
The Austrro-Russian blockade of Komárom between 1 September and 2 October 1849

General György Klapka, the commander of the Hungarian defenders, wanted to learn more about the number and position of the enemy forces, and he did so by means of a reconnaissance-in-force. This led to a period of sorties and fighting with the besieging army, such as the Battle of Hetény, from 5 September, between the Lehel Hussars and the Russian Cossacks, when the hussars led by Captain Lajos Csomortányi scored a brilliant victory. However, on the same day, late in the evening, Csomortányi reported that a strong Russian Uhlan squadron forced him to retreat to Izsa. But at Kurtakeszi he made a brilliant attack with his three companies of Hussars against this squadron and forced them to retreat.

On the left bank of the Danube, Hungarian outposts were positioned along the Zsitva, and the Nyitra rivers all the way to the Danube, with cavalry in the first line and infantry in the second. There was an outpost skirmish at the Ács forest. The Austrians occupied the forest and drove the Hungarian outposts back. From then on, the fortress was completely encircled.

On 7 September, at dawn, the Hungarian vanguards at the bridge of the Zsitva were attacked by a Cossack troop, but they put the Russians to flight. Meanwhile, another Cossack troop crossed the Zsitva, pushed back the Hussar outposts, and also broke through the infantry's skirmish line. However, the vanguards, which were earlier forced to retreat, rapidly regrouped, fired at the Cossacks, and routed them, killing a man and a horse.

The outposts at Zsitva, especially, suffered much from the constant harassment of the Cossacks. The vanguard engagements and artillery duels continued in the following days, such as that at the Monostor entrenchments on 8 and 9 September.

On 9 September, the Hungarians were informed by a spy that the region between Érsekújvár and Komáromszentpéter was poorly defended by the Russians. As a result of this, the defenders decided to make a raid in that region. The battle which followed, was written down in his diary by Lieutenant József Szinnyei (1830–1913), who after the war became an important bibliographer, librarian, literary historian, and lexicographer.

== Battle ==
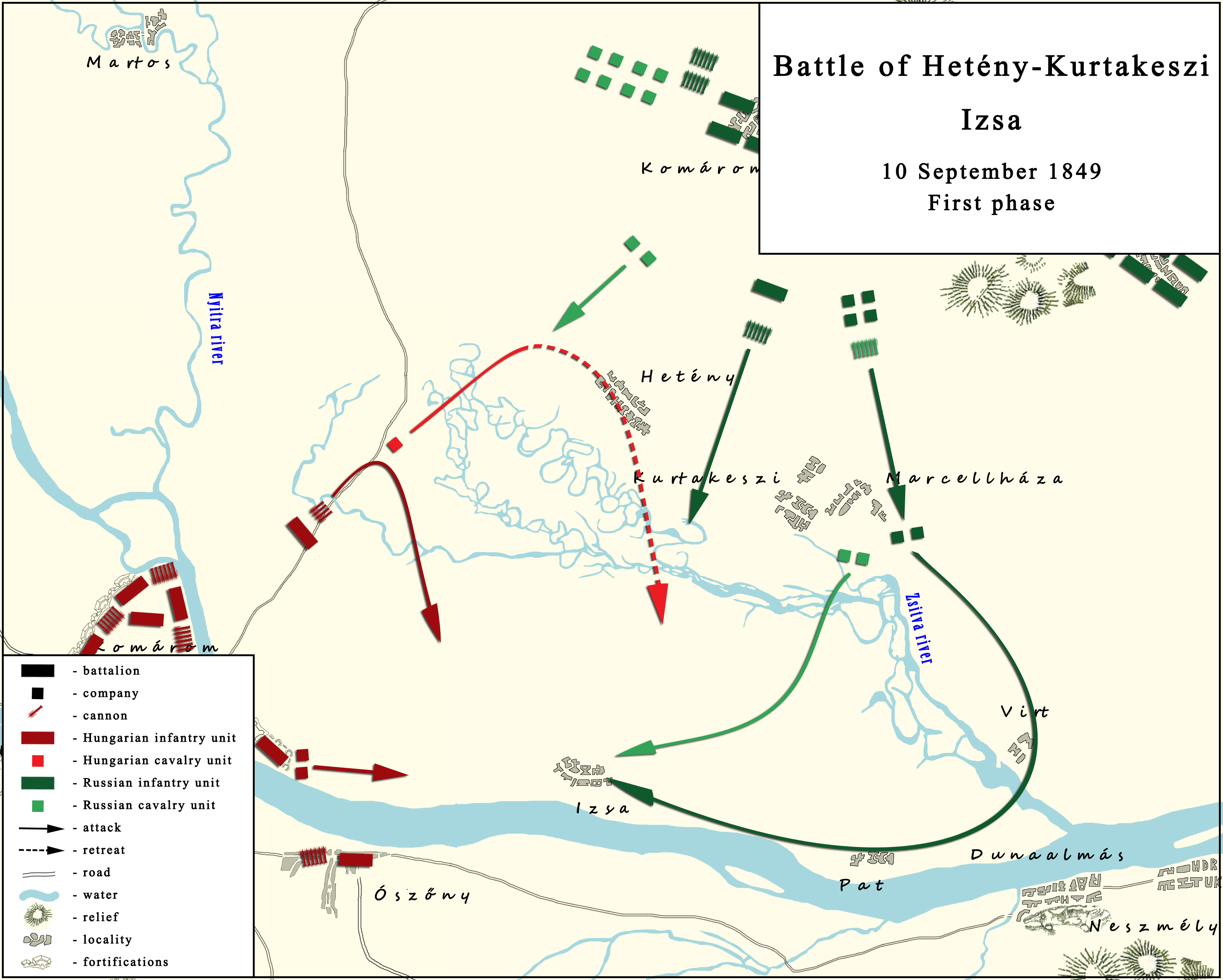
Battle of Hetény-Kurtakeszi-Izsa from 10 September 1849 – first phase

At sunrise of 10 September, General Klapka sent an infantry battalion, a hussar company, and half a cavalry battery across the Zsitva, north of Hetény, to attack the village. But the vigilant Cossacks thwarted this enterprise, and after a skirmish, forced the hussars to retreat. Then between Hetény and Kurtakeszi, the Russians deployed 2 infantry battalions, 4 uhlan companies, and 12 guns. In this first phase of the battle, the Russians wanted to set a trap for the Hungarians, trying to make the Hungarian troops believe that the place is not properly defended, then, with considerable forces, to crush them.

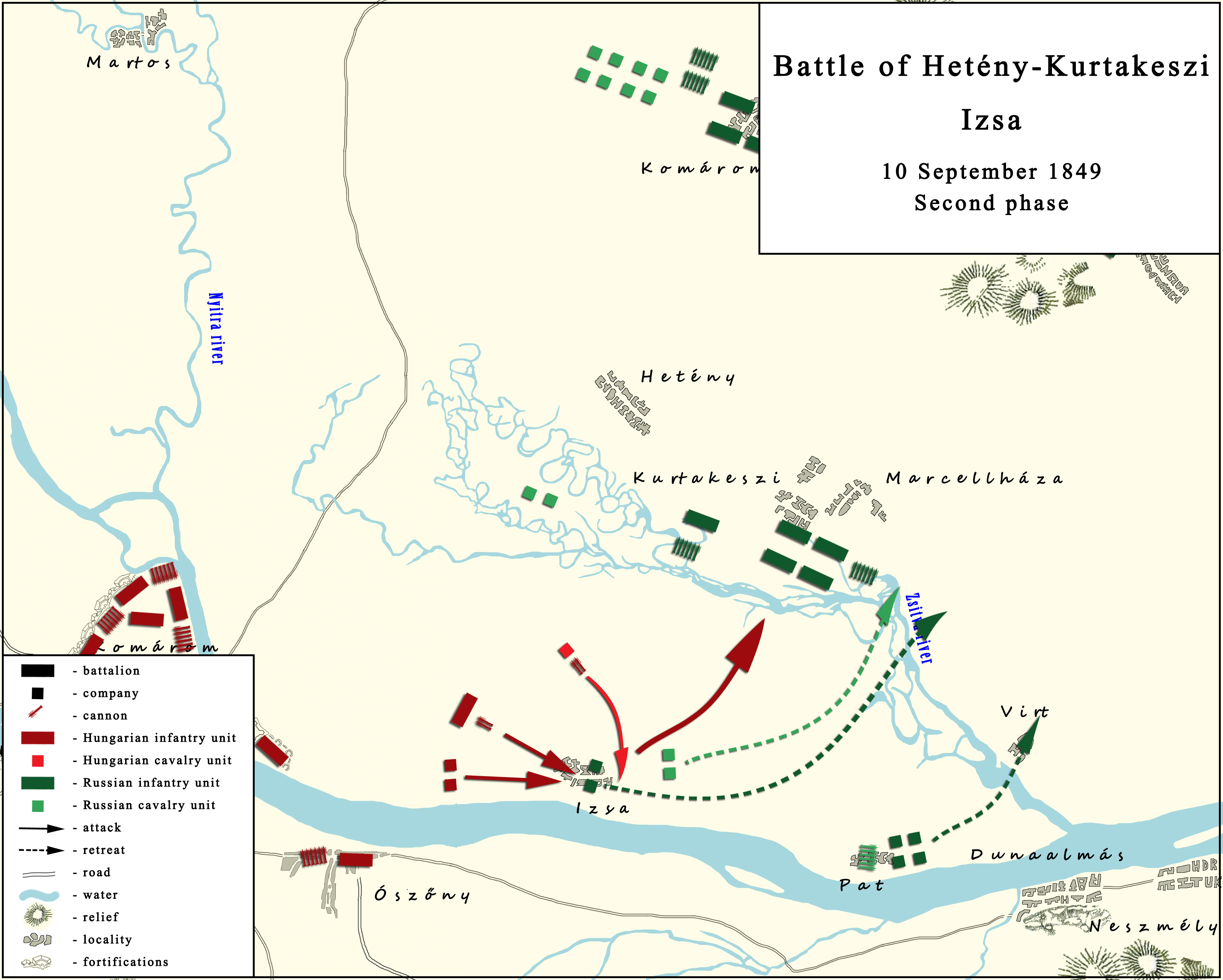
Battle of Hetény-Kurtakeszi-Izsa from 10 September 1849 – second phase

During the retreat, the commander of the Hungarian vanguard from Izsa reported that the Cossacks attacked this place and that enemy infantry and cavalry squadrons, which had crossed the Zsitva at Pat, were approaching Izsa, with the intention of cutting off their retreat route. The Hungarian detachment, reinforced by 2 companies, marched there and while the infantry with 2 guns moved towards the village, the cavalry with another 2 guns went around it.

The Hungarian infantry entered the village and with a bayonet charge chased out the Russian vanguard of two Jäger companies. Seeing this, the Russian main troops turned and retreated swiftly across the Zsitva. The Hungarian hussars pursued them vigorously but could not reach them from behind; only the cannons fired a few shots after them.

This minor battle alarmed the Russian troops, so they gathered a considerable force around Marcelháza. The Hungarians stood face-to-face with them until noon but, after the Russians made no attempt to advance, the Hungarians retreated to the Vág-Danube line.

== Aftermath ==
In the next days, to protect their outposts from Cossack attacks, the Hungarians formed several small groups of 5-6 soldiers, each group was led by a hussar, who stood as a sentinel, and whenever a group of Cossacks tried to squeeze through the Hungarian lines or set an ambush, the Hussar would notice them from afar, ride back, and alert his group, which then would form a mass with their bayonets pointing at the Cossacks.

The reconnaissances and outpost skirmishes between 5 and 10 September 1849 made it clear to Klapka that Komárom was indeed surrounded by significant enemy forces.

Despite the continuous skirmishes between the besiegers and the defenders, in the periods between the larger fights, there were examples of friendly interactions between the Hungarians and the Russians, while with the Austrians the contacts were confined only to fighting. Waving white handkerchiefs, groups of 2–3 Hungarians and Russians crossed the outposts, exchanged cigarettes and drinks with each other, and chatted. Later it turned out that the Russians' real intentions were not to make friendships, but with their friendly approach, to convince the Hungarians to voluntarily surrender, and to stir up a revolt among them against their commanders. But this did not turn out to be very successful, because when the Russians asked how long the Hungarians wanted to continue their resistance, they responded: at least 18 months.

From 11 September, the skirmishes between the Hungarian defenders and the Austro-Russian besieging army were paused.

=== Armistice and talks ===
On 11 September, Klapka received the following message from the high commander of the Austrian army, Field Marshal Julius Jacob von Haynau: "The castle of Pétervárad unconditionally surrendered on the 7th of September and was occupied by the Imperial troops. As soon as I have informed the fortress [Komárom's] and commandment of this, I call, repeatedly, upon the fortress commandment and the garrison of Komárom to surrender in the same manner, otherwise the garrison will only have to blame themselves for the sad consequences, which result from the futile, prolonged reluctance and resistance." In response, the next day Klapka replied on behalf of the Council of War: "We have the honor to reply to the appeal which arrived here yesterday concerning the unconditional surrender of the fortress, declaring that Komárom is firmly resolved to hold out to the last man rather than surrender unconditionally without honorable surrender conditions. From the Council of War held in Komárom Castle, 12 September 1849, Klapka, Hungarian General."

Despite Klapka's reply to Haynau, the situation in the fortress was not promising. Although the mood and behavior of the guards were generally very good, under the influence of the discouraging news from all parts of the country and partly under the influence of the intrigues inside the fortress, the mood became increasingly affected by desertions, first of all, from the 48th Battalion. This dangerous blow to morale prompted Klapka to declare summary trials, as a deterrence, whereupon two deserters from the 48th Battalion were immediately sentenced to death by the court-martial and shot in the head; similarly, deserters from the 60th Battalion who were captured were also handed over for summary trial. The danger became even greater when one day part of a company of the Bocskay Hussar regiment declared themselves freed from their military duties and, throwing down their weapons, demanded their immediate dismissal. Their commander, Major Kaszap, made futile efforts to return them to their duty, and after they failed to comply even with Klapka's benevolent warning, they were all handed over to the court of summary execution, which sentenced all of them to death, along with all the deserters from the 60th Infantry Battalion. In the case of the Bocskay Hussars, Klapka "softened" this death sentence to a decimation, and for the deserters of the 60th Battalion only for the most guilty ones. As a result, on 14 August the sentence was carried out on 7 Hussars and 8 soldiers by shooting. This drastic example had an effect because from then on neither escapes nor riots occurred.

On 14 September, Klapka convened another council of war, at which he persuaded his fellow officers to soften their surrender terms, agreed to on 1 September, and to appeal directly to the Emperor. To increase the chances of a settlement, they promised to release 600 sick and convalescent Austrian prisoners. Field Marshal Laval Nugent, in a letter of 16 September, informed Kalpa, that he was pleased to note the offer to release the prisoners, and, as to the request, he stated that he had immediately submitted it to His Majesty. When Klapka communicated this to the council of war, which was immediately assembled, Lieutenant Colonel Zsigmond Thaly, in a long speech, in which he strongly opposed the negotiations and the surrender of the fortress, suddenly began to accuse Klapka of betraying the Hungarians, who immediately took him prisoner. General Klapka was also informed that Thaly and Lieutenant-Colonel József Makk were planning to remove him and declare the "Republic of Csallóköz", but he ultimately refrained from prosecuting them.

On 19 September, Colonel Hartmann, the Emperor's aide-de-camp, and Lieutenant-Colonel Jungbauer, Chief of Staff of the besieging army, entered the castle and delivered the Emperor's reply, in which he refused to make any political concessions to the Hungarians, but promised amnesty to all Hungarian soldiers and officers, defenders of Komárom, who had not been in the Imperial-Royal (Austrian) Army before the revolution, while those who had switched from the Imperial Army to the Hungarian Army would be court-martialed, but only if they did not leave the country within the next 12 days. The Emperor's offer was valid for 48 hours. The defenders had until then to decide whether or not to accept it.

Klapka, after receiving the emperor's response, called a council of war for 5 o'clock that afternoon, to which he summoned all the regular officers, in addition to the ordinary members. Due to the nervousness of the participants, the meeting was postponed until the next day, when, after a lengthy and heated discussion, it was decided that the defenders were willing to enter into negotiations, but only on the basis of the terms announced initially; and to this end, a 14-member committee, led by Colonels József Kászonyi and Pál Eszterházy, set out for Nugent's headquarters that same day.

On the evening of 22 September, the committee returned to the fortress with the answer that Nugent could not deviate from the instructions he had received from Vienna. Klapka then held another council of war on the 23rd, and after reporting on the proceedings of the committee, he said in a solemn tone, raising his right hand to the sky: "I swear by Almighty God that we will defend the fortress to the last man, as Hungarians and soldiers, in accordance with the principles we had declared in the last council of war, and on the basis of our honor." These words of Klapka were followed by a loud and resounding cheer, and under the influence of these words an illuminated procession was held in his honour in the evening.

As a result, hostilities resumed on 26 September.

== Sources ==
- Babucs, Zoltán (2023), "Csatározás Hetény és Kurtakeszi között 1849. szeptember 10-én", Felvidék.ma (10 september 2023) (in Hungarian)
- Bánlaky, József (2001). A magyar nemzet hadtörténelme ("The Military History of the Hungarian Nation) (in Hungarian). Budapest: Arcanum Adatbázis.
- Bóna, Gábor (1987). Tábornokok és törzstisztek a szabadságharcban 1848–49 ("Generals and Staff Officers in the War of Independence 1848–1849") (in Hungarian). Budapest: Zrínyi Katonai Kiadó. p. 430. ISBN 963-326-343-3.
- Hermann, Róbert (2001). Az 1848–1849-es szabadságharc hadtörténete ("Military History of the Hungarian War of Independence of 1848–1849") (in Hungarian). Budapest: Korona Kiadó. ISBN 963-9376-21-3.
- Hermann, Róbert (2013). Nagy csaták. 16. A magyar függetlenségi háború ("Great Battles. 16. The Hungarian Freedom War") (in Hungarian). Budapest: Duna Könyvklub. ISBN 978-615-5129-00-1.
- Szinnyei, József (1887). Komárom 1848-49-ben (Napló-jegyzetek) (PDF) (in Hungarian). Budapest: Aigner Lajos.
