= Milan Pavlovič =

Slovak footballer

Personal information
- Full name: Milan Pavlovič
- Date of birth: 22 November 1980 (age 45)
- Place of birth: Nitra, Czechoslovakia
- Height: 1.87 m (6 ft 1 1/2 in)
- Positions: Defensive midfielder; centre back

Team information
- Current team: Veľké Ludince (head coach)

Senior career*
Years	Team	Apps	(Gls)
–2010	Nitra		
2001	→Družstevník Lapáš (loan)		
2002–2004	OFK Veľký Lapáš		
2004	→Vráble (loan)		
- Tulwn
?–2006	Neusiedl		
2005–2007	Močenok		
2007–2009	Brezová pod Bradlom		
–2010	Senica	21	(3)
2010–2012	Zlaté Moravce	62	(5)

Managerial career
- 2017–2019: Hlohovec
- 2019–2021: Imeľ
- 2021–present: Veľké Ludince
- * Club domestic league appearances and goals as of 9 March 2023

Milan Pavlovič (born 22 November 1980 in Nitra) is a Slovak manager and former football midfielder. Currently he is a head coach of Slovak 3. liga club TJ Družstevník Veľké Ludince.
