= Gejza Baranyai =

Slovak football player

Personal information
- Full name: Gejza Baranyai
- Date of birth: 13 November 1983 (age 42)
- Place of birth: Marcelová, Czechoslovakia
- Height: 1.74 m (5 ft 9 in)
- Position: Forward

Team information
- Current team: MŠO Štúrovo

Youth career
- FK Marcelová
- 1998–1999: →TJ Juhcelpap Štúrovo (loan)

Senior career*
Years	Team	Apps	(Gls)
?–2004	FK Marcelová		
2002–2003	→Veľké Ludince (loan)		
2004	→AS Trenčín (loan)		
2004–2008	AS Trenčín	62	(7)
2007	→Lučenec (loan)		
2008–2009	→Zlín	13	(0)
2009	Zlín B		
2009–2011	Nové Zámky		
2011–	MŠO Štúrovo		
- * Club domestic league appearances and goals as of 10 July 2012

Gejza Baranyai (born 13 November 1983 in Marcelová) is a Slovak football player who currently plays for MŠO Štúrovo. He is of Hungarian ethnicity.

== Career ==
Born in Marcelová, Baranyai began playing football for Štúrova. He next signed for Slovak Superliga side AS Trenčín, and went on loan to LAFC Lučenec. In January 2008, the 24-year-old was transferred to FC Tescoma Zlín of the Czech Gambrinus liga.
