= Yaniv Edery =

Moroccan-French footballer (born 2003)

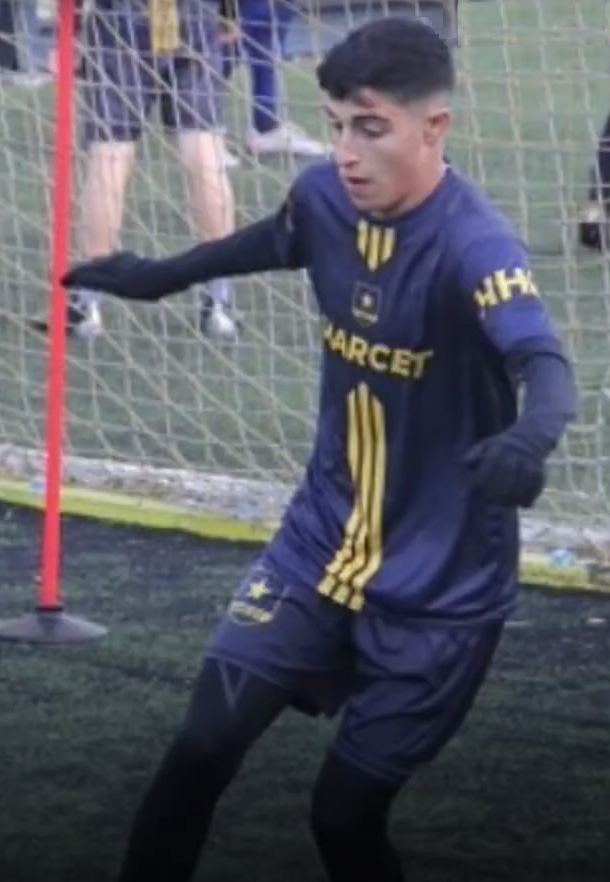
- Edery playing for Marcet Football University in 2019

Personal information
- Date of birth: 23 June 2003 (age 23)
- Place of birth: Marseille, France
- Height: 1.80 m (5 ft 11 in)
- Position: Defender

Team information
- Current team: S.U. Sintrense
- Number: 28

Youth career
- 2018–2019: Hapoel Ra'anana
- 2019–2020: Marcet Football University
- 2020–2021: Hapoel Ramat Gan

Senior career*
Years	Team	Apps	(Gls)
2021	Club Deportivo Estepona	5	(1)
2021–2022	Real Balompédica Linense	0	(2)
2021–2022	→ Linense B	23	(4)
2022–2023	FC Nitra	13	(2)
2023	Zorya Luhansk	0	(0)
2023	FC Sfîntul Gheorghe	3	(0)
2023–2024	S.U. Sintrense	0	(0)
2023	→ Sintrense B	12	(4)
2024–2025	Club Ferrocarril Midland	0	(0)
2025–	Jerusalem F.C.	5	(1)
- * Club domestic league appearances and goals as of 1 July 2024

Yaniv Edery (Hebrew: יניב אדרי, Arabic: يانيف أدري; born 23 June 2003) is a French-Moroccan professional footballer who plays as a defender.

== Club career ==
Yaniv Edery has played in eight countries and leagues.

As a youth player, Edery played for Israeli football club Hapoel Ra'anana at the age of 15. His father used to film him and sent the videos to several clubs. One of those clubs was Olympique de Marseille, where Edery received an invitation for a trial. Olympique de Marseille was interested in the player, but unable to keep him due to administrative constraints at the time.

Edery followed up his career at the Marcet Football University, located in Barcelona at the age of 17 years. After his academy career in Spain, he joined the second division of the Israeli Football League club Hapoel Ramat Gan under a youth contract.

=== Club Deportivo Estepona ===
After joining the Israeli club, Edery returned to Spain the same season, by joining Club Deportivo Estepona, playing in the fourth tier of the Spanish football pyramid. Joining the Tercera División outfit in January 2021, Edery featured in the senior squad. At the end of the season, he left the club without making any official senior appearances, while the club relegated to División de Honor.

=== Real Balompédica Linense ===
After his earlier stint in Spain, Edery joined Real Balompédica Linense of the Spanish third tier. Edery appeared only for friendly fixtures in their line-up. Having been stationed at their 'B' team, he made a handful of appearances for Real Balompédica Linense B. Edery played mostly at Spanish amateur level in the Segunda Andaluza Cádiz football league, which is the eight tier of the Spanish football league system.

After his stint in Spain, Edery was transferred to Slovak outfit FC Nitra, one of the oldest football clubs in Slovakia. Joining the club transfer free, Edery signed a two-year contract until August 2024. Playing in the 4. Liga, the fourth-tier football league in Slovakia, Edery made a total of 685 minutes.

=== Zorya Luhansk ===
Due to his performance at FC Nitra, Edery appeared on the radar of Ukrainian football team Zorya Luhansk, earning a trial period. Following the trial, he stayed with the club for a few months with the kit number 68. During his brief stint at Zorya Luhansk, which lasted from January 2023 until March 2023, Edery trained with the second team: Zorya Luhansk II. In March 2023, Edery decided to not extend his stay with Zorya Luhansk due to the ongoing Russian invasion of Ukraine. Edery made no official appearances for the club.

=== FC Sfîntul Gheorghe ===
Edery joined Moldovan professional football club FC Sfîntul Gheorghe based in Suruceni for the remainder of the 2022–23 season. Edery made his professional football debut in the Moldovan Super Liga, in a 2–0 win against FC Bălți. He made in total three appearances as a substitute for his club in his first season.

At the end of the 2022–23 season, FC Sfîntul Gheorghe dissolved due to financial difficulties. The club released all players and staff, including Edery, allowing the players to join a new club transfer free.

=== Sport União Sintrense ===
In August 2023, Edery reportly joined Portuguese football club Sport União Sintrense based in Sintra. S.U. Sintrense plays in the Campeonato de Portugal, the fourth division of Portuguese football. Edery primarily plays with Sintrense B, the reserve team. Sintrense B plays in the A.F. Lisboa II Divisão.

Edery made his first team appearance in January 2024, debuting in the squad as an unused substitute in a 2–1 win against Vasco da Gama Vidigueira.

=== Club Ferrocarril Midland ===
In July 2024, Edery signed with Argentinian side Club Ferrocarril Midland. Edery mostly played for the reserves team.

=== FC Jerusalem ===
In January 2025 after the conclusion of the Argentian football calendar, Edery signed with Jerusalem FC halfway throughout their Liga Alef campaign.

== International career ==
Edery is eligible to represent Morocco national football team, France national football team and Israel national football team at international level. Edery garnered attention in Morocco for expressing his desire to one day represent the Morocco, and becoming the first Moroccan Jew to play for the national team. He even appeared on national TV channel 2M.

In 2022, Edery refused a call-up for the Israel national under-19 team, in order to stay eligible for Morocco.

== Personal life ==
Edery was born in Marseille, France, and is of Moroccan-Jewish and Israeli descent. He moved to Ra'anana, Israel two years later, where his father was specialized in building houses.

== Career statistics ==
As of match played 1 February 2025

Appearances and goals by club, season and competition
Club	Season	League			National Cup		League Cup		Europe		Total	
Club	Season	Division	Apps	Goals	Apps	Goals	Apps	Goals	Apps	Goals	Apps	Goals
CD Estepona	2020–21	Tercera División	0	0	0	0	0	0	0	0	0	0
R.B. Linense	2021–22	Primera Division RFEF	0	0	0	0	0	0	0	0	0	0
Linense B	2021-22	Segunda Andaluza	23	4	0	0	0	0	0	0	23	0
Total			23	4	0	0	0	0	0	0	0	0
FC Sfîntul Gheorghe	2022–23	Moldovan Super Liga	3	0	0	0	0	0	0	0	3	0
Total			3	0	0	0	0	0	0	0	3	0
S.U. Sintrense	2023–24	Campeonato de Portugal	0	0	0	0	0	0	0	0	0	0
Sintrense B	2023–24	A.F. Lisboa II Divisão	12	0	0	0	0	0	0	0	12	0
Club Ferrocarril Midland	2024	Primera B Metropolitana	0	0	0	0	0	0	0	0	0	0
Jerusalem F.C.	2024–25	Liga Alef	0	0	0	0	0	0	0	0	0	0
Career total			38	4	0	0	0	0	0	0	38	0
