= FK Marcelová =

Slovak football club

- Full name: FK Marcelová
- Ground: Futbalový štadión FK Marcelová, Marcelová
- President: Robert Viderman
- Head coach: Miroslav Zsidek
- League: 3. Liga
- 2018–19: 1st, 4. liga ZsFZ Východ (East) (promoted)
- Website: http://fkmarcelova.sk/

FK Marcelová is a Slovak football team, based in the town of Marcelová.

== Colours ==
Club colours are yellow and green.
