= Jozef Rybnikář =

Slovak footballer

Personal information
- Date of birth: 13 June 1975 (age 51)
- Position: Midfielder

Senior career*
Years	Team	Apps	(Gls)
1992–1995	Spartak Trnava		
1996	Slovan Hlohovec		
1997–1999	Ozeta Dukla Trenčín		
2000–2001	Nitra		
2001	MFK Prievidza		
2002–2005	ŠKP Podbrezová		
- * Club domestic league appearances and goals

Jozef Rybnikář (born 13 June 1975) is a retired Slovak football midfielder.
