= Ladislav Kuna =

Slovak footballer (1947–2012)

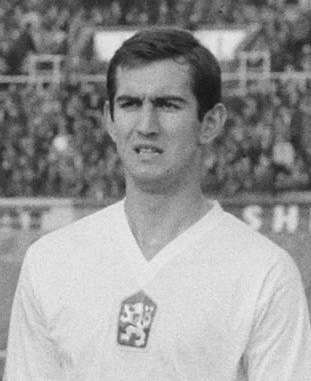
- Kuna in 1966

Personal information
- Date of birth: 3 April 1947
- Place of birth: Hlohovec, Czechoslovakia
- Date of death: 1 February 2012 (aged 64)
- Place of death: Bratislava, Slovakia
- Height: 1.82 m (6 ft 0 in)
- Position: Midfielder

Youth career
- Slovan Hlohovec

Senior career*
Years	Team	Apps	(Gls)
1964–1980	Spartak Trnava	424	(86)
1980–1983	Admira Wien	90	(6)
Total		514	(92)

International career
1966–1974	Czechoslovakia	47	(9)

Managerial career
- 1988–1990: Spartak Trnava
- 1991–1992: Mödling
- 1992–1993: 1. Wiener Neustädter
- 1995–1996: Trenčín
- 1997–1999: Piešťany
- 1999–2001: Dunajská Streda
- 2001–2004: Podbrezová
- 2005: Dunajská Streda
- 2005–2010: Martin
- * Club domestic league appearances and goals

Ladislav Kuna (3 April 1947 – 1 February 2012) was a Slovak footballer and manager who played as a central midfielder.

Kuna played 424 matches and scored 86 goals in the Czechoslovak First League, all for Spartak Trnava. His number of appearances in the Czechoslovak First League was previously the record, and was only bettered by Přemysl Bičovský. He received 47 appearances for Czechoslovakia, scoring nine goals, and participated at the 1970 FIFA World Cup. In 1969, Kuna was named Czechoslovak Footballer of the Year. Kuna was chairman of Spartak Trnava from 2006 until his death of cancer in February 2012.

== Honours ==
=== Player ===
Spartak Trnava

- Czechoslovak First League: 1968, 1969, 1971, 1972, 1973
- Czechoslovak Cup: 1967, 1971, 1975
- Slovak Cup: 1971, 1975
- Mitropa Cup: 1967; runner-up 1968

Individual

- Czechoslovak Footballer of the Year: 1969
- World XI: 1973
