= OFK SIM Raslavice =

Slovak football club

- Full name: OFK SIM Raslavice
- Founded: 1930
- Ground: Futbalový štadión FŠ OFK SIM, Raslavice
- Capacity: 400
- President: Marián Plančár
- Head coach: Ľubomír Puhák
- League: 3. Liga - East Group
- 2025–26: 2025–26 6th
- Website: https://ofk-raslavice.webnode.sk/

OFK SIM Raslavice is a Slovak football team, based in the town of Raslavice. The club's colours are red and white.
