= Raslavice =

- Municipality
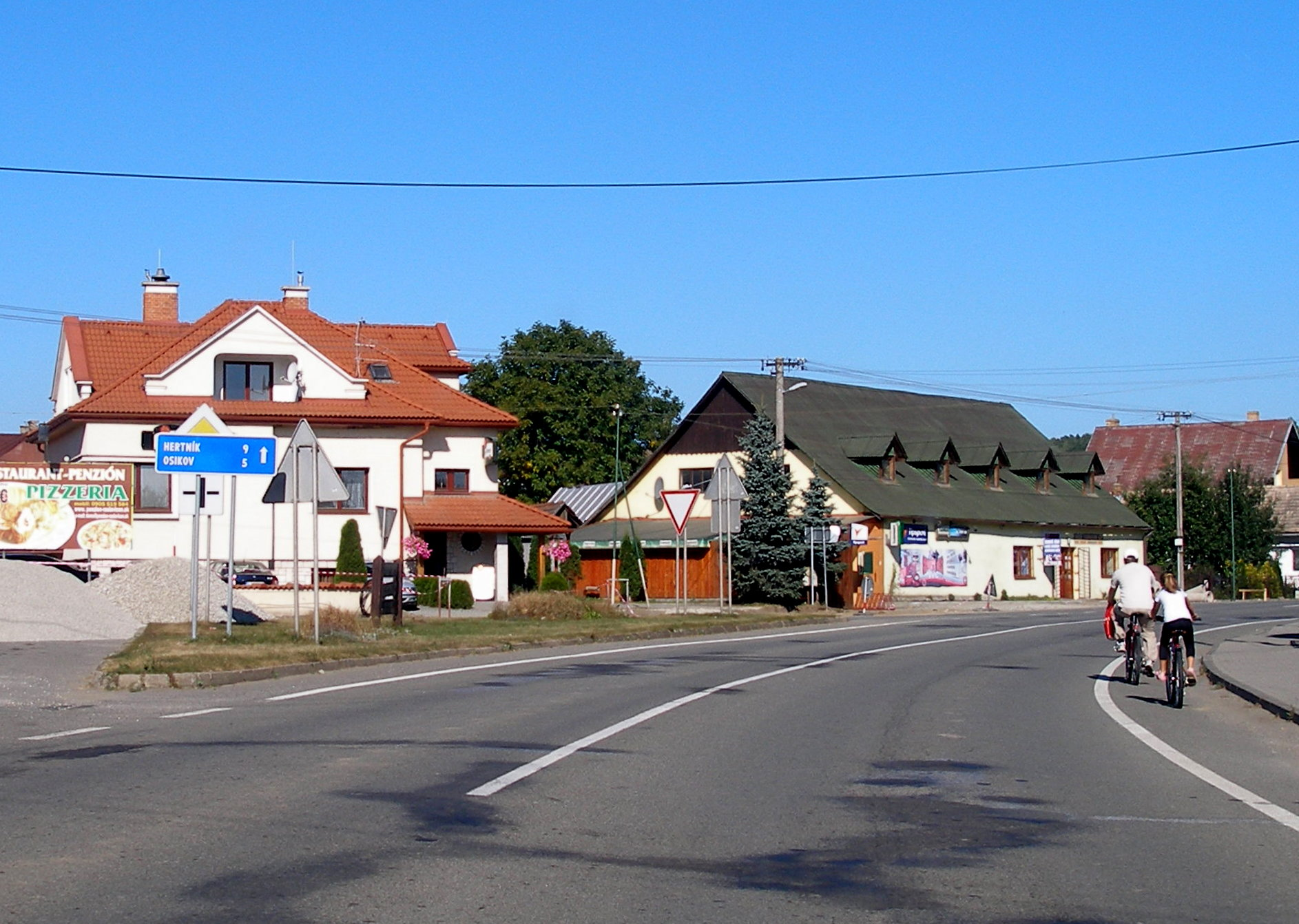

- Flag

- Location of Raslavice in the Prešov Region Location of Raslavice in Slovakia
- Coordinates: 49.15°N 21.32°E
- Country: Slovakia
- Region: Prešov Region
- District: Bardejov District
- First mentioned: 1261

Area
  - Total: 16.47 km^{2} (6.36 sq mi)
- Elevation: 306 m (1,004 ft)

Population (2025)
  - Total: 2,830
- Time zone: UTC+1 (CET)
  - Summer (DST): UTC+2 (CEST)
- Postal code: 864 1
- Area code: +421 54
- Vehicle registration plate (until 2022): BJ
- Website: www.raslavice.sk

Raslavice is a village and municipality in Bardejov District in the Prešov Region of north-east Slovakia.

== History ==
In historical records the village was first mentioned in 1261

== Geography ==
The municipality lies at an altitude of 306 metres (1,004 ft) and covers an area of 16.47 km^{2} (6.36 sq mi) (2025).

== Population ==
Population statistic (10 years)
Year	1995	2005	2015	2025
Count	2326	2609	2746	2830
Difference		+12.16%	+5.25%	+3.05%

Population statistic
Year	2024	2025
Count	2802	2830
Difference		+0.99%

It has a population of 2830 people (31 December 2025).

=== Ethnicity ===
Census 2021 (1+ %)
Ethnicity	Number	Fraction
Slovak	2736	97.99%
Romani	130	4.65%
Not found out	32	1.14%
Total	2792	

In year 2021 was 2792 people by ethnicity 2736 as Slovak, 130 as Romani, 32 as Not found out, 12 as Rusyn, 7 as Other, 6 as Czech, 5 as Albanian, 1 as Vietnamese, 1 as Ukrainian, 1 as Italian, 1 as Russian and 1 as Romanian.

Note on population: The difference values of population numbers in the table "Population statistic" and in the sections "Ethnicity" & "Religion" is caused by the use of various statistical methods.

=== Religion ===
Census 2021 (1+ %)
Religion	Number	Fraction
Roman Catholic Church	2416	86.53%
Evangelical Church	195	6.98%
None	100	3.58%
Greek Catholic Church	55	1.97%
Total	2792	

In year 2021 was 2792 people by religion 2416 from Roman Catholic Church, 195 from Evangelical Church, 100 from None, 55 from Greek Catholic Church, 10 from Not found out, 7 from Ad hoc movements, 3 from Eastern Orthodox Church, 3 from Christian Congregations in Slovakia, 1 from United Methodist Church, 1 from Buddhism and 1 from Apostolic Church.
