= Marcet Foundation =

Spanish youth football organization

The Marcet Foundation (Spanish: Fundación Marcet) is a youth education and football organization.

== History ==
The Marcet Football University was founded in 1978 by José Ignacio Marcet as a football youth training organization in Europe, which has established schools in various parts of the world. Programs allow students to train and pursue education at the same time. This includes training in leadership and professionalism.

== Program ==
By 2018, over a million players had trained with Marcet alongside more than three thousand staff members. The academy had programs present in 30 different countries, and hosted players including eighteen students from North Korea, more than a dozen students from Ukraine, South Korea, China, Indonesia, Kazakhstan, India, and Honduras. The children of high-profile parents, such as Shakira and Gerard Piqué, have also attended their schools. The school's most populous program is in Barcelona, Abroad schools have been set up as far away as Canada or India. Alumni of the academy have included Han Kwang-song, Oliver Torres, and Konrad de la Fuente. Marcet has partnered with football clubs in order to arrange junior competitions, including FC Barcelona.
