= MFK Bytča =

Slovak football club

- Full name: Mestský futbalový klub Bytča
- Founded: 1912; 114 years ago (as Nagybitcsei FC)
- Ground: Futbalový štadión MFK Bytča, Bytča
- Capacity: 2,000
- President: Miroslav Minárčik
- Head coach: Stanislav Lojdl
- League: 2. Liga
- 2025–26: 3. Liga (Stred), 1st of 14 (promoted)
- Website: www.mfkbytca.sk

MFK Bytča is a Slovak football team, based in the town of Bytča. The club was founded in 1912. The club will be played in the 2. Liga, the 2nd tier of Slovak football, after winning 2025–26 3. Liga (Stred) season. The club hosts home games at the Futbalový štadión MFK Bytča.

== Colors and badge ==
Its colors are white and blue.

== History ==
- 1912–1919 Founded as Nagybitcsei FC
- 1919–1956 Renamed ŠK Slovan Bytča
- 1945–1947 Renamed ŠK Veľká Bytča
- 1947–1949 Renamed ŠK Slovan Bytča
- 1949–1953 Renamed JTO Sokol PM Bytča
- 1953–1975 Renamed TJ Spartak Bytča
- 1975–1993 Renamed TJ ZVL Bytča
- 1993–2016 Renamed FO Kinex Bytča
- 2016–present Renamed MFK Bytča

== Current squad ==
As of 22 July 2026

Note: Flags indicate national team as defined under FIFA eligibility rules; some limited exceptions apply. Players may hold more than one non-FIFA nationality.

No.	Pos.	Nation	Player
—	GK	SVK	Adrián Tkáč
—	DF	SVK	Lukáš Mravec
—	DF	SVK	Andrej Knapec
—	DF	SVK	Robert Petrus
—	DF	SVK	Samuel Kaštan
—	MF	SVK	Gabriel Gaňa
—	MF	SVK	Alex Mičienka
—	MF	SVK	Matej Pavlík
—	MF	SVK	Jakub Hrtánek
—	DF	SVK	Matej Zajac
—	FW	SVK	Daniel Hundák
—	GK	SVK	Richard Rybar
—	MF	SVK	Rastislav Planeta
—	MF	SVK	Tomáš Podmalík

No.	Pos.	Nation	Player
—	MF	SVK	Matúš Filek
—	MF	SVK	Daniel Magát
—	FW	SVK	Matěj Brezina
—	FW	BRA	Luis Felipe
—	FW	SVK	Branislav Minárik
—	FW	SVK	Patrik Jakubík
—	GK	SVK	Tobias Fuka
—	DF	UKR	Vasyl Subotenko
—	DF	NGA	Saleh Haruna
—	DF	SLV	Kiano Falcao
—	FW	COL	Cesar Luna
—	DF	SVK	Jozef Chrenko
—	FW	SVK	Arthur Miroslav Boženík
