= TJ Imeľ =

Slovak football club

- Full name: TJ Imeľ
- Founded: 1945
- Ground: Futbalový štadión TJ Imeľ, Imeľ
- Capacity: 1,000
- Head coach: Milan Pavlovič
- League: 3. liga
- 2020–21: 3. liga Západ, 11th

TJ Imeľ is a Slovak football team, based in the town of Imeľ. The club was founded in 1945. Club colors are red and yellow. TJ Imeľ home stadium is Futbalový štadión TJ Imeľ with a capacity of 1,000 spectators.

== Historical names ==
- TJ Imeľ (?–present)
