= MFK Spartak Medzev =

Slovak football club

- Full name: MFK Spartak Medzev
- Ground: Štadión MFK Spartak Medzev, Medzev
- Capacity: 1,000 (Seats)
- President: Maroš Čierny
- Head coach: Jozef Fabian
- League: 3. liga (East)
- 2025–26: 7th

MFK Spartak Medzev is a Slovak football team, based in the town of Medzev.

== Players ==
=== Current squad ===
As of 28 May 2026. Note: Flags indicate national team as defined under FIFA eligibility rules; some limited exceptions apply. Players may hold more than one non-FIFA nationality.

No.	Pos.	Nation	Player
