= FC Slovan Hlohovec =

Football club in Trnava Region, Slovakia

- Founded: 1914; 112 years ago
- Stadium: Štadión Slovan Hlohovec
- Manager: Miroslav Karhan
- League: 5. Liga

FC Slovan Hlohovec (full name: Futbalový club Slovan Hlohovec) is a Slovak football club based in the town of Hlohovec in the Trnava Region.

The club plays its home games in the Štadión Slovan Hlohovec.

== History ==
=== Founding and early years ===
Slovan Hlohovec were founded in the year 1914. In the following decades, the club competed in regional competitions until the early 1960s.

=== 1965–1987: Golden years ===
In the 1965–72 seasons, the club played in higher Regional Leagues. This was followed by playing in the second highest competition in Czechoslovakia, between the years 1974–77 and again in 1978–80. Until the 1980s, the club played in both the third and second leagues. From 1987 until the Dissolution of Czechoslovakia, Slovan Hlohovec played in the Division West.

=== 1993–2017: Decline and rise ===
The club played in the 4th league for the 1993–94 season. The following seven seasons, Hlohovec were in the 3rd league – group West. Between 2001–2013, the club played in the third and fourth leagues before returning in the 2013/14 season to the 5th league of the ZsFZ – group West, playing there until 2016. In the 2016/17 season, the club got promoted to the 4th league of the ZsFZ – group North-West. In 2017, the club changed its name to FC Slovan Hlohovec.

=== 2022–present: Recent years ===
Since the 2022/2023 season, the club has been operating in the 5th league of the West Slovak Football Association, group Northwest. They previously played in the 5 league in 2013. After beating ŠK Báb 3–1 in the first round of the Slovak Cup, the 5th league side faced Slovak First Football league side AS Trenčín on 24 August 2022. Slovan lost 14–0 in a record breaking win for Trenčín. In the 1st round of the 2024–25 Slovak Cup, Hlohovec were drawn with ŠK Cífer. The match ended in a 0–0 draw, with Cífer winning on penalties 9–8.

On 23rd July 2025, it was announced that former Slovak international Miroslav Karhan would become the new manager of Slovan Hlohovec.

=== Historic names ===
- 1914 – founded
- TJ Slovan Hlohovec (Telovýchovná jednota Slovan Hlohovec)
- TJ Slovan Slovakofarma Hlohovec (Telovýchovná jednota Slovan Slovakofarma Hlohovec)
- 199? – FC Slovan Hlohovec (Futbalový club Slovan Hlohovec)

== Stadium ==
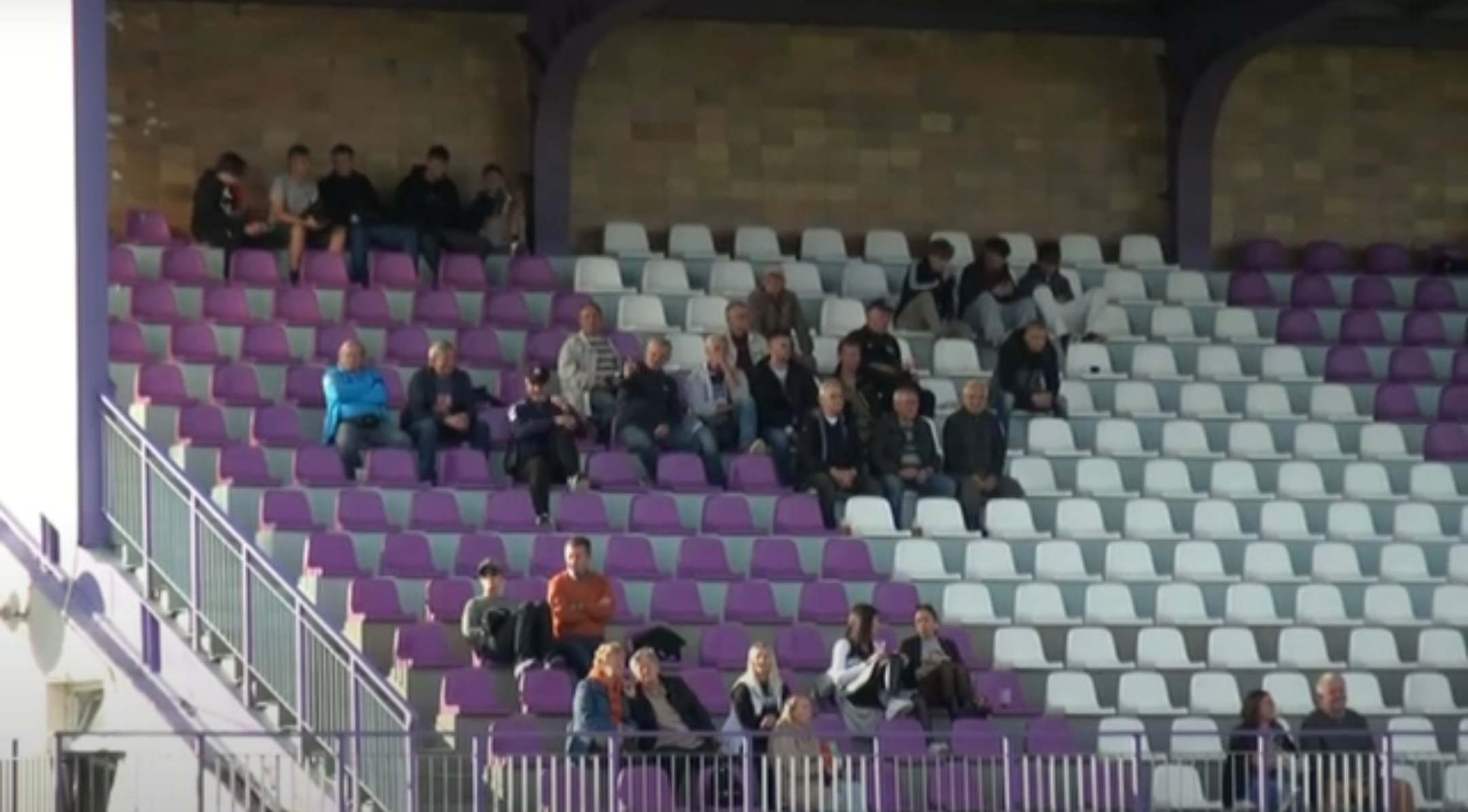
A stand in the Štadión Slovan Hlohovec

Slovan Hlohovec play in the Štadión Slovan Hlohovec. The ground was reconstructed in 2018 to have artificial grass. The Slovak Football Association supported the project with a subsidy of €100,000 euros. The first game on the ground was in a friendly match between the legends of Spartak Trnava, led by former Slovak national team players Miroslav Karhan and Igor Bališ, against the local FC Slovan Hlohovec.

== Records ==
=== Cup performances ===
Season	Round	Team	Result	Source
2017–18	1	Jaslovské Bohunice	4–4 (5–4)	
2017–18	2	Vydrany	2–2 (6–7)	
2018–19	1	Alekšince	4–1	
2022-23	1	ŠK Báb	3–1	
2022-23	2	AS Trenčín	0–14	
2024-25	1	ŠK Cífer	0–0 (8–9)	
2025-26	1	FC Pata	0–1	

== Notable players ==
- (Slovakia) Dušan Kabát
- (Slovakia) Ladislav Kuna (Youth player)
- (Slovakia) Jozef Rybnikář
