= Jozef Kotula =

Slovak footballer

Personal information
- Date of birth: 20 September 1976 (age 50)
- Place of birth: Levice, Czechoslovakia
- Height: 1.75 m (5 ft 9 in)
- Position: Right midfielder

Youth career
- –2011: FC Nitra

Senior career*
Years	Team	Apps	(Gls)
1999–2004	FC Nitra	70	(0)
1995–1999	Sportfreunde Siegen	145	(7)
2004–2006	Artmedia Petržalka	37	(0)
2005–2006	→ Spartak Trnava (loan)	27	(0)
2006–2007	SV Wilhelmshaven	23	(4)
2007–2009	Rot-Weiss Essen	44	(1)
2009–2010	Spartak Trnava	14	(0)
Total		360	(12)
- * Club domestic league appearances and goals

Jozef Kotula (born 20 September 1976) is a Slovak former professional footballer who played as a right midfielder.
