= 2025–26 3. Liga (Slovakia) =

3. Liga
- Season: 2025–26
- Champions: Slovan Galanta (West); MFK Bytča (Central); FK Humenné (East)
- Promoted: Slovan Galanta (West); MFK Bytča (Central); FK Humenné (East)

The 2025–26 3. Liga (Slovakia) is the 33rd edition of the third tier 3. Liga (Slovakia) since its establishment in 1993. 44 teams contested being divided into three geographic groups: 3. liga Západ (West), 3. liga Stred (Central) and 3. liga Východ (East).

== Západ (West) ==
=== League table ===
Pos	Team	Pld	W	D	L	GF	GA	GD	Pts	Promotion or relegation
1	Slovan Galanta (C, P)	30	19	5	6	58	30	+28	62	Promotion to 2. Liga
2	Myjava	30	17	10	3	62	28	+34	61	
3	Prievidza	30	15	11	4	67	48	+19	56	
4	Nové Zámky	30	17	5	8	47	37	+10	56	
5	Trenčín B	30	16	4	10	73	51	+22	52	
6	Beluša	30	14	7	9	54	39	+15	49	
7	Gabčíkovo	30	14	5	11	51	50	+1	47	
8	Senec	30	12	8	10	42	35	+7	44	
9	Častkovce	30	11	9	10	59	47	+12	42	
10	Veľké Ludince	30	12	3	15	44	56	−12	39	
11	DAC Dunajská Streda B	30	9	9	12	40	41	−1	36	
12	Slovan Duslo Šaľa	30	8	5	17	53	62	−9	29	
13	Rača	30	5	10	15	40	56	−16	25	
14	Komárno B	30	6	6	18	36	65	−29	24	
15	Malacky	30	5	8	17	35	62	−27	23	Possible relegation to 4. Liga
16	Petržalka B (R)	30	5	5	20	27	81	−54	20	Relegation to 4. Liga

Source: sportnet.sme.sk
Rules for classification: 1) Points; 2) Head-to-head points; 3) Head-to-head goal difference; 4) Head-to-head away goals scored; 5) Play-off.
(C) Champions; (P) Promoted; (R) Relegated

== Stred (Central) ==
=== League table ===
Pos	Team	Pld	W	D	L	GF	GA	GD	Pts	Promotion or relegation
1	Bytča (C, P)	26	18	5	3	57	30	+27	59	Promotion to 2. Liga
2	Námestovo	26	17	3	6	66	28	+38	54	
3	Dukla Banská Bystrica B	26	15	7	4	49	29	+20	52	
4	Lučenec	26	12	7	7	39	33	+6	43	
5	Fiľakovo	26	13	4	9	46	44	+2	43	
6	Martin	26	11	7	8	51	38	+13	40	
7	Rimavská Sobota	26	10	6	10	53	57	−4	36	
8	Ružomberok B	26	10	6	10	50	44	+6	36	
9	Podkonice	26	10	4	12	40	40	0	34	
10	Kalinovo	26	9	3	14	30	43	−13	30	
11	Oravské Veselé	26	7	5	14	36	45	−9	26	
12	Dolný Kubín	26	5	6	15	41	65	−24	21	
13	Kysucké Nové Mesto	26	5	5	16	21	50	−29	20	Possible relegation to 4. Liga
14	Bánová (R)	26	3	6	17	26	59	−33	15	Relegation to 4. Liga

Source: sportnet.sme.sk
Rules for classification: 1) Points; 2) Head-to-head points; 3) Head-to-head goal difference; 4) Head-to-head away goals scored; 5) Play-off.
(C) Champions; (P) Promoted; (R) Relegated

== Východ (East) ==
=== Stadiums and locations ===
Location of teams in Slovak 3. liga 2025–26 East

Team	Location	Stadium	Capacity
FC Lokomotíva Košice	Košice (Sever)	Štadión Lokomotívy	9,000
MŠK Tesla Stropkov	Stropkov	Štadión MŠK Tesla Stropkov	2,500
MFK Snina	Snina	Mestský futbalový štadión	6,000
Slávia TU Košice	Košice (Sever)	Štadión TU Watsonova	1,000
MFK Vranov nad Topľou	Vranov nad Topľou	Stadium MFK Vranov nad Topľou	5,000
ŠK Odeva Lipany	Lipany	Štadión ŠK Odeva	4,000
FTC Fiľakovo	Fiľakovo	Štadión FTC Fiľakovo	3,000
FK Poprad	Poprad	NTC Poprad	5,700
MŠK Spišské Podhradie	Spišské Podhradie	Štadión Spišské Podhradie	600
FK Spišská Nová Ves	Spišská Nová Ves	Mestský štadión	4,000
TJ Baník Kalinovo	Kalinovo	Stadium TJ Baník Kalinovo	1,200
Partizán Bardejov	Bardejov	Mestský štadión Bardejov	3,040
MŠK Novohrad Lučenec	Lučenec	Mestský štadión	5,000
MFK Dolný Kubín	Dolný Kubín	Štadión MUDr. Ivana Chodáka	1,950
MŠK Rimavská Sobota	Rimavská Sobota	Na Záhradkách Stadium	5,000
MŠK Námestovo	Námestovo	Štadión MŠK Námestovo	2,000

=== League table ===
Pos	Team	Pld	W	D	L	GF	GA	GD	Pts	Promotion or relegation
1	Humenné (C, P)	26	21	5	0	88	20	+68	68	Promotion to 2. Liga
2	Spišská Nová Ves	26	20	5	1	66	18	+48	65	
3	Tesla Stropkov	26	13	5	8	48	37	+11	44	
4	Odeva Lipany	26	13	4	9	46	43	+3	43	
5	Poprad	26	11	4	11	35	34	+1	37	
6	Raslavice	26	10	5	11	46	45	+1	35	
7	Medzev	26	9	6	11	47	50	−3	33	
8	Snina	26	8	7	11	33	38	−5	31	
9	Kežmarok	26	9	4	13	41	46	−5	31	
10	Lokomotíva Košice	26	7	9	10	33	59	−26	30	
11	Košice B	26	8	5	13	41	47	−6	29	
12	Vranov nad Topľou	26	5	10	11	33	45	−12	25	
13	Sabinov	26	5	9	12	26	47	−21	24	Possible relegation to 4. Liga
14	Spišské Podhradie (R)	26	2	4	20	27	81	−54	10	Relegation to 4. Liga

Source: sportnet.sme.sk
Rules for classification: 1) Points; 2) Head-to-head points; 3) Head-to-head goal difference; 4) Head-to-head away goals scored; 5) Play-off.
(C) Champions; (P) Promoted; (R) Relegated
