= Marcelová =

Marcelová Marcelháza
- Municipality
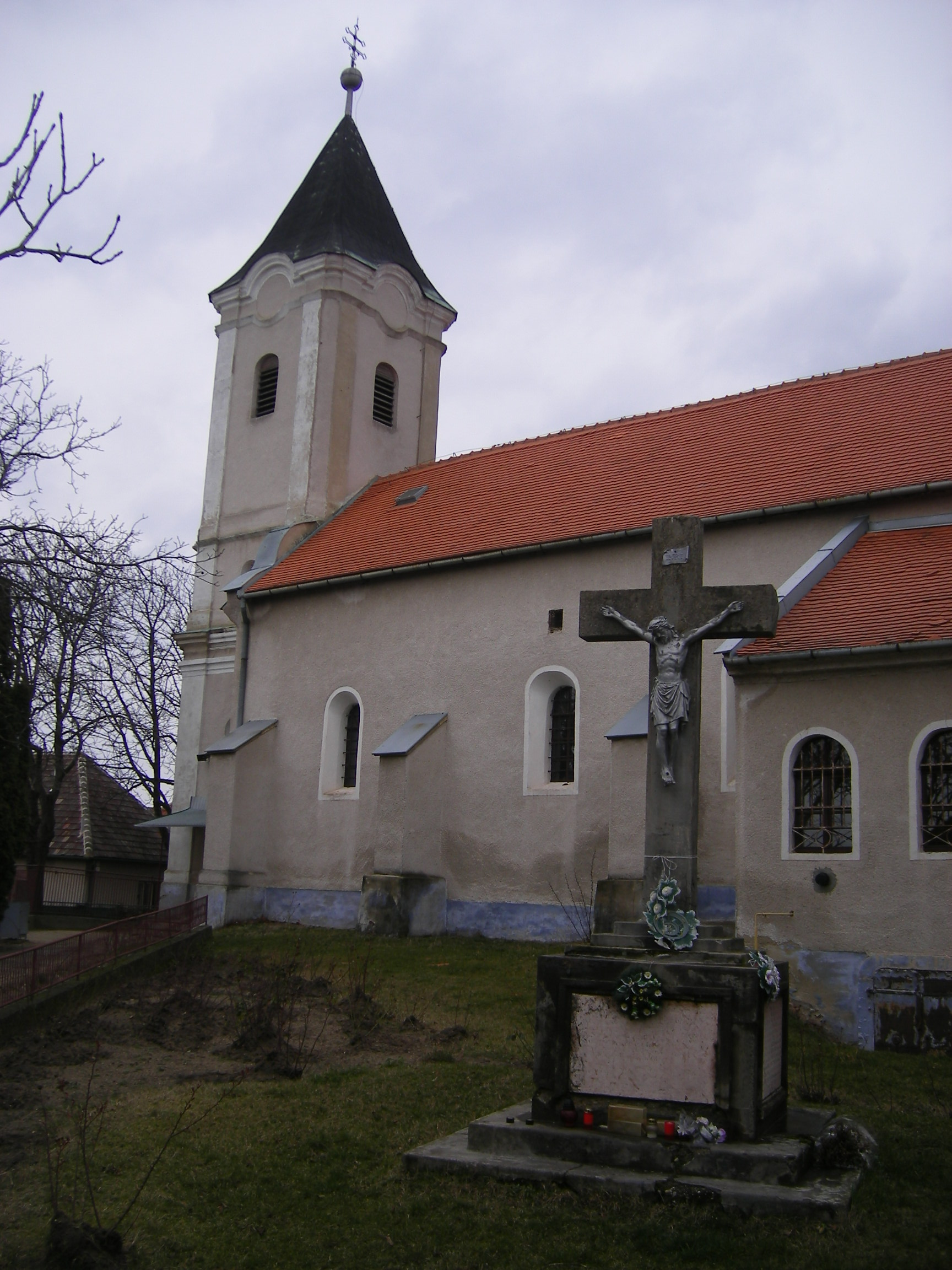
- Church of Saint John the Baptist

- Flag Coat of arms

- Location of Marcelová in the Nitra Region Location of Marcelová in Slovakia
- Coordinates: 47.78°N 18.28°E
- Country: Slovakia
- Region: Nitra Region
- District: Komárno District
- First mentioned: 1353

Area
  - Total: 35.74 km^{2} (13.80 sq mi)
- Elevation: 112 m (367 ft)

Population (2025)
  - Total: 3,790
- Time zone: UTC+1 (CET)
  - Summer (DST): UTC+2 (CEST)
- Postal code: 946 32
- Area code: +421 35
- Vehicle registration plate (until 2022): KN
- Website: www.marcelova.sk

Marcelová (Hungarian: Marcelháza, Hungarian pronunciation:[ˈlɒksɒkaːllɒʃ]) is a village and municipality in the Komárno District in the Nitra Region of south-west Slovakia.

== Geography ==
The municipality lies at an altitude of 112 metres (367 ft) and covers an area of 35.74 km^{2} (13.80 sq mi) (2025).

== History ==
In the 9th century, the territory of Marcelová became part of the Kingdom of Hungary. In historical records, the village was first mentioned in 1245. After the Austro-Hungarian army disintegrated in November 1918, Czechoslovak troops occupied the area, later acknowledged internationally by the Treaty of Trianon. Between 1938 and 1945, Marcelová once more became part of Miklós Horthy's Hungary through the First Vienna Award. From 1945 until the Velvet Divorce, it was part of Czechoslovakia. Since then, it has been part of Slovakia.

== Population ==
Population statistic (10 years)
Year	1995	2005	2015	2025
Count	3738	3855	3722	3790
Difference		+3.13%	−3.45%	+1.82%

Population statistic
Year	2024	2025
Count	3794	3790
Difference		−0.10%

It has a population of 3790 people (31 December 2025).

=== Ethnicity ===
Census 2021 (1+ %)
Ethnicity	Number	Fraction
Hungarian	2900	76.27%
Slovak	594	15.62%
Not found out	483	12.7%
Romani	54	1.42%
Total	3802	

In year 2021 was 3802 people by ethnicity 2900 as Hungarian, 594 as Slovak, 483 as Not found out, 54 as Romani, 8 as Rusyn, 7 as Czech, 3 as Bulgarian, 2 as Other, 1 as Italian, 1 as Romanian and 1 as Polish.

Note on population: The difference values of population numbers in the table "Population statistic" and in the sections "Ethnicity" & "Religion" is caused by the use of various statistical methods.

=== Religion ===
Census 2021 (1+ %)
Religion	Number	Fraction
Roman Catholic Church	2201	57.89%
Calvinist Church	592	15.57%
Not found out	445	11.7%
None	444	11.68%
Total	3802	

In year 2021 was 3802 people by religion 2201 from Roman Catholic Church, 592 from Calvinist Church, 445 from Not found out, 444 from None, 33 from Greek Catholic Church, 17 from Evangelical Church, 13 from Other and not ascertained christian church, 13 from Other, 12 from Christian Congregations in Slovakia, 11 from Jehovah's Witnesses, 9 from Baptists Church, 2 from Old Catholic Church, 2 from Ad hoc movements, 1 from Eastern Orthodox Church, 1 from Paganism and natural spirituality, 1 from Islam, 1 from United Methodist Church, 1 from Czechoslovak Hussite Church, 1 from Church of Jesus Christ of Latter-day Saints, 1 from Bahá'i Community and 1 from Apostolic Church.

The village is about 88% Hungarian, 10% Slovak and 2% Romany.

== Facilities ==
The village has a public library, and a football pitch.

== Notable people ==
- Gejza Baranyai (born 1983), football player
