= ŠK 1923 Gabčíkovo =

Slovak football club

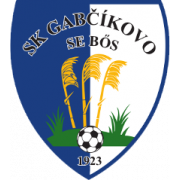
- Full name: Športový klub 1923 Gabčíkovo
- Founded: 2016; 10 years ago
- Ground: Stadium Gabčíkovo, Gabčíkovo, Slovakia
- Chairman: Arpád Meszáros
- Head coach: Gábor Straka
- League: 3. liga
- 2025-26: 7th

ŠK 1923 Gabčíkovo is a Slovak association football club located in Gabčíkovo. It currently plays in 3. liga (3rd tier in Slovak football system). The club was founded in 2016, after buying license from ŠK Senec.

== Dispute between city of Gabčíkovo and TJ OFC Gabčíkovo ==
The main sponsor of ŠK 1923 Gabčíkovo is city of Gabčíkovo. President of TJ OFC Gabčíkovo - Győrgy Csőrgő has blamed mayor of Gabčíkovo city that he used illegal practices when he helped to create ŠK 1923 Gabčíkovo, merging with ŠK Senec, also another problem is ŠK 1923 Gabčíkovo crest which is according to Győrgy Csőrgő copy of TJ OFC Gabčíkovo crest.

== Notable players ==
Past and present.

- (Slovakia) Ján Marcin
- (Slovakia) Benjamín Száraz
- (Slovakia) Andrej Maťašovský
- (Slovakia) Tamás Lénárth
