= Imeľ =

Imeľ Imely
- Municipality
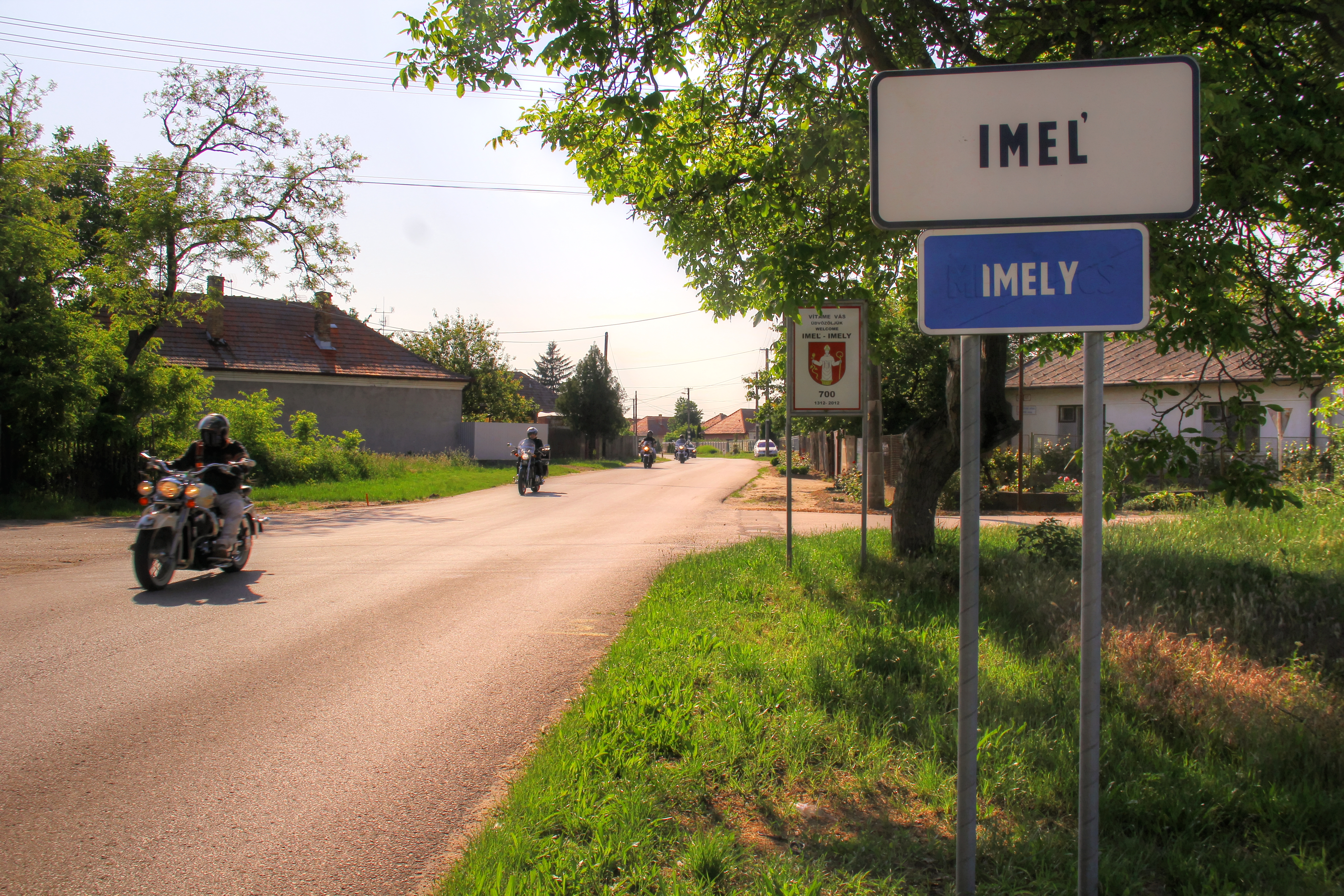
- Entering the village

- Flag Coat of arms

- Location of Imeľ in the Nitra Region Location of Imeľ in Slovakia
- Coordinates: 47.90°N 18.15°E
- Country: Slovakia
- Region: Nitra Region
- District: Komárno District
- First mentioned: 1404

Area
  - Total: 21.95 km^{2} (8.47 sq mi)
- Elevation: 111 m (364 ft)

Population (2025)
  - Total: 1,975
- Time zone: UTC+1 (CET)
  - Summer (DST): UTC+2 (CEST)
- Postal code: 946 52
- Area code: +421 35
- Vehicle registration plate (until 2022): KN
- Website: www.obecimel.sk

Imeľ (Hungarian: Imely, Hungarian pronunciation:[ˈiːmɛj]) is a village and municipality in the Komárno District in the Nitra Region of southwest Slovakia.

== History ==
In historical records the village was first mentioned in 1404. It was sacked by Ottoman troops in 1561. It was also managed by Ottoman Empire during periods of 1566-1595, 1605-1606 and 1663-1685. It was recorded as "Imo" as part of Komaran nahiya in Estergon sanjak of Budin Eyalet in 1664 Ottoman record. It had 45 homes and 12470 akches of tax was collected.

After the Austro-Hungarian army disintegrated in November 1918, Czechoslovak troops occupied the area, later acknowledged internationally by the Treaty of Trianon. Between 1938 and 1945 Imeľ once more became part of Miklós Horthy's Hungary through the First Vienna Award. From 1945 until the Velvet Divorce, it was part of Czechoslovakia. Since then it has been part of Slovakia.

== Geography ==
The municipality lies at an altitude of 111 metres (364 ft) and covers an area of 21.95 km^{2} (8.47 sq mi) (2025).

== Population ==
Population statistic (10 years)
Year	1995	2005	2015	2025
Count	2277	2123	1946	1975
Difference		−6.76%	−8.33%	+1.49%

Population statistic
Year	2024	2025
Count	1992	1975
Difference		−0.85%

It has a population of 1975 people (31 December 2025).

According to the 2011 census, the municipality had 2,054 inhabitants. 1,125 of inhabitants were Slovaks, 878 Hungarians and 51 others and unspecified.

== Facilities ==
The village has a public library, a gym and a football pitch. It also has a cinema.

== See also ==
- List of municipalities and towns in Slovakia

== Genealogical resources ==
The records for genealogical research are available at the state archive "Statny Archiv in Nitra, Slovakia"

- Roman Catholic church records (births/marriages/deaths): 1705-1895 (parish A)
- Reformated church records (births/marriages/deaths): 1786-1936 (parish B)
