= 2012–13 Győri ETO FC season =

Győri ETO FC
2012–13 season
- Chairman: (Hungary) Csaba Tarsoly
- Manager: (Hungary) Attila Pintér
- NB 1: Winner
- Hungarian Cup: Runners-up
- Hungarian League Cup: Quarter-final
- Top goalscorer: League: Roland Varga (11); All: Nemanja Andrić (12)
- Highest home attendance: 13,700 v Ferencváros (12 May 2013)
- Lowest home attendance: 300 v Eger (6 March 2013)
Home colours	Away colours

The 2012–13 season will be Győri ETO FC's 69th competitive season, 53rd consecutive season in the OTP Bank Liga and 108th year in existence as a football club.

== First team squad ==
Note: Flags indicate national team as defined under FIFA eligibility rules; some limited exceptions apply. Players may hold more than one non-FIFA nationality.

No.	Pos.	Nation	Player
1	GK	SRB	Saša Stevanović
2	DF	HUN	Ákos Takács
3	MF	CRO	Marko Dinjar
4	DF	SRB	Lazar Stanišić
5	DF	SVK	Marián Had
6	MF	EST	Tarmo Kink (loan from Varese)
7	FW	HUN	Balázs Farkas
8	MF	HUN	Ádám Dudás
9	MF	SLO	Rok Kronaveter
10	FW	GEO	Rati Aleksidze
11	FW	HUN	Roland Varga
12	MF	SRB	Nikola Trajković
13	MF	HUN	Zsolt Kalmár
14	MF	LTU	Linas Pilibaitis
15	DF	HUN	Dániel Völgyi
16	DF	HUN	Zoltán Lipták
17	MF	HUN	Máté Pátkai

No.	Pos.	Nation	Player
18	DF	HUN	Ádám Lang
19	MF	SRB	Nemanja Andrić
20	MF	ROU	Mihai Nicorec
21	MF	CZE	Marek Střeštík
22	MF	CZE	Michal Švec
23	FW	HUN	Tibor Tokody
24	MF	BIH	Đorđe Kamber
25	FW	GEO	Giorgi Kvilitaia
25	FW	EST	Jarmo Ahjupera
26	GK	SVK	Ľuboš Kamenár
28	DF	SRB	Vladimir Đorđević
29	MF	HUN	Tamás Koltai
30	GK	SVK	Péter Molnár
31	FW	HUN	István Matetits
34	MF	HUN	Tamás Varga
35	FW	HUN	Csanád Novák

== Transfers ==
=== Summer ===
In: Note: Flags indicate national team as defined under FIFA eligibility rules; some limited exceptions apply. Players may hold more than one non-FIFA nationality.

No.	Pos.	Nation	Player
7	FW	ROU	Mihai Dina (from (Romania) Petrolul Ploiești)
7	FW	BRA	Nicolas Ceolin (loan return from Budapest Honvéd)
8	FW	ALG	Fouad Bouguerra (loan return from (Algeria) Constantine)
9	MF	SLO	Rok Kronaveter (from (Germany) Energie Cottbus)
16	DF	HUN	Zoltán Lipták (from Újpest)
18	DF	HUN	Ádám Lang (from Veszprém)
19	MF	SRB	Nemanja Andrić (from (Serbia) Rad)
20	MF	ROU	Mihai Nicorec (loan return to Zalaegerszeg)
21	MF	CZE	Marek Střeštík (from (Czech Republic) Zbrojovka Brno)
22	MF	CZE	Michal Švec (from (Netherlands) Heerenveen)
26	DF	GEO	Lasha Totadze (loan return to (Georgia (country)) Dila Gori)
30	MF	GEO	Giorgi Ganugrava (loan return to Zalaegerszeg)

Out: Note: Flags indicate national team as defined under FIFA eligibility rules; some limited exceptions apply. Players may hold more than one non-FIFA nationality.

No.	Pos.	Nation	Player
6	MF	HUN	Zoltán Fehér (to Szombathely)
7	FW	BRA	Nicolas Ceolin (to Pécs)
8	FW	ALG	Fouad Bouguerra (to (Algeria) CS Constantine)
9	MF	SVK	Otto Szabó (to Pápa)
14	MF	HUN	Máté Kiss (loan to Siófok)
16	MF	BRA	Ji-Paraná
18	MF	HUN	József Windecker (loan to Siófok)
19	FW	HUN	András Simon (loan to Pápa)
21	MF	CZE	Marek Střeštík (loan return to (Czech Republic) Zbrojovka Brno)
22	DF	CRO	Valentin Babić
26	DF	HUN	Bence Zámbó (loan to Kaposvár)
26	DF	GEO	Lasha Totadze (to (Georgia (country)) Dinamo Batumi)
27	GK	HUN	Péter Nacsa (loan to Pápa)
30	MF	GEO	Giorgi Ganugrava (to (Georgia (country)) Metalurgi Rustavi)

=== Winter ===
In: Note: Flags indicate national team as defined under FIFA eligibility rules; some limited exceptions apply. Players may hold more than one non-FIFA nationality.

No.	Pos.	Nation	Player
5	DF	SVK	Marián Had (from (Slovakia) Slovan Bratislava)
6	MF	EST	Tarmo Kink (loan from (Italy) Varese)
7	FW	HUN	Balázs Farkas (from Debrecen)
13	MF	HUN	Zsolt Kalmár (from Győr U-19)
19	FW	HUN	András Simon (loan return from Pápa)
25	FW	GEO	Giorgi Kvilitaia (from (Georgia (country)) Sasco)
26	GK	SVK	Ľuboš Kamenár (from (France) Nantes)

Out: Note: Flags indicate national team as defined under FIFA eligibility rules; some limited exceptions apply. Players may hold more than one non-FIFA nationality.

No.	Pos.	Nation	Player
7	FW	ROU	Mihai Dina (to (Romania) Timişoara)
19	FW	HUN	András Simon (loan to Szombathely)

- List of Hungarian football transfers summer 2012
- List of Hungarian football transfers winter 2012–13

== Statistics ==
=== Appearances and goals ===
Last updated on 2 June 2013.

No.	Pos	Nat	Player	Total		OTP Bank Liga		Hungarian Cup		League Cup	
No.	Pos	Nat	Player	Apps	Goals	Apps	Goals	Apps	Goals	Apps	Goals
1	GK	(Serbia) SRB	Saša Stevanović	33	-32	27	-29	4	0	2	-3
2	DF	(Hungary) HUN	Ákos Takács	31	1	23	0	3	0	5	1
3	MF	(Croatia) CRO	Marko Dinjar	25	3	15	0	4	1	6	2
4	DF	(Serbia) SRB	Lazar Stanišić	1	0	1	0	0	0	0	0
5	DF	(Slovakia) SVK	Marián Had	9	0	5	0	4	0	0	0
6	FW	(Estonia) EST	Tarmo Kink	16	3	10	1	5	2	1	0
7	FW	(Hungary) HUN	Balázs Farkas	3	0	1	0	0	0	2	0
8	MF	(Hungary) HUN	Ádám Dudás	29	11	16	1	6	7	7	3
9	MF	(Slovenia) SLO	Rok Kronaveter	29	11	19	5	6	2	4	4
10	FW	(Georgia (country)) GEO	Rati Aleksidze	13	5	7	0	1	3	5	2
11	FW	(Hungary) HUN	Roland Varga	32	11	26	11	4	0	2	0
12	MF	(Serbia) SRB	Nikola Trajković	31	8	23	7	6	1	2	0
13	MF	(Hungary) HUN	Zsolt Kalmár	5	2	2	1	0	0	3	1
14	MF	(Lithuania) LTU	Linas Pilibaitis	19	1	11	1	5	0	3	0
15	DF	(Hungary) HUN	Dániel Völgyi	24	6	16	4	4	2	4	0
16	DF	(Hungary) HUN	Zoltán Lipták	33	0	26	0	6	0	1	0
17	DF	(Hungary) HUN	Máté Pátkai	35	2	26	1	7	1	2	0
18	DF	(Hungary) HUN	Ádám Lang	12	0	4	0	3	0	5	0
19	MF	(Serbia) SRB	Nemanja Andrić	36	12	21	3	9	6	6	3
20	MF	(Romania) ROU	Mihai Nicorec	21	3	10	0	5	1	6	2
21	MF	(Czech Republic) CZE	Marek Střeštík	36	6	25	3	6	2	5	1
22	MF	(Czech Republic) CZE	Michal Švec	34	0	23	0	6	0	5	0
23	DF	(Hungary) HUN	Tibor Tokody	17	1	9	0	4	1	4	0
24	MF	(Bosnia and Herzegovina) BIH	Đorđe Kamber	36	10	27	8	5	1	4	1
25	FW	(Estonia) EST	Jarmo Ahjupera	7	0	3	0	3	0	1	0
25	FW	(Georgia (country)) GEO	Giorgi Kvilitaia	3	1	2	0	0	0	1	1
26	GK	(Slovakia) SVK	Ľuboš Kamenár	4	-7	3	-4	0	0	1	-3
28	DF	(Serbia) SRB	Vladimir Đorđević	18	1	4	0	7	0	7	1
29	MF	(Hungary) HUN	Tamás Koltai	24	8	20	8	3	0	1	0
30	GK	(Slovakia) SVK	Péter Molnár	11	-17	1	0	5	-8	5	-9
31	FW	(Hungary) HUN	István Matetits	2	0	1	0	0	0	1	0
34	MF	(Hungary) HUN	Tamás Varga	1	0	1	0	0	0	0	0
35	FW	(Hungary) HUN	Csanád Novák	2	0	1	0	0	0	1	0
Youth players:
32	DF	(Hungary) HUN	Máté Kozma	1	0	0	0	1	0	0	0
32	DF	(Hungary) HUN	Attila Kálmán	1	0	0	0	0	0	1	0
37	MF	(Hungary) HUN	László Németh	4	0	0	0	2	0	2	0
38	FW	(Hungary) HUN	Imre Vankó	1	0	0	0	0	0	1	0
41	MF	(Hungary) HUN	Olivér Paget	1	0	0	0	0	0	1	0
Players no longer at the club:
7	FW	(Romania) ROU	Mihai Dina	12	2	8	1	1	1	3	0

=== Top scorers ===
Includes all competitive matches. The list is sorted by shirt number when total goals are equal.

Last updated on 2 June 2013

Position	Nation	Number	Name	OTP Bank Liga	Hungarian Cup	League Cup	Total
1	(Serbia)	19	Nemanja Andrić	3	6	3	12
2	(Hungary)	11	Roland Varga	11	0	0	11
3	(Slovenia)	9	Rok Kronaveter	5	2	4	11
4	(Hungary)	8	Ádám Dudás	1	7	3	11
5	(Bosnia and Herzegovina)	24	Đorđe Kamber	8	1	1	10
6	(Hungary)	29	Tamás Koltai	8	0	0	8
7	(Serbia)	12	Nikola Trajković	7	1	0	8
8	(Hungary)	15	Dániel Völgyi	4	2	0	6
9	(Czech Republic)	21	Marek Střeštík	3	2	1	6
10	(Georgia (country))	10	Rati Aleksidze	0	3	2	5
11	(Estonia)	6	Tarmo Kink	1	2	0	3
12	(Romania)	20	Mihai Nicorec	0	1	2	3
13	(Croatia)	5	Marko Dinjar	0	1	2	3
14	(Romania)	7	Mihai Dina	1	1	0	2
15	(Hungary)	17	Máté Pátkai	1	1	0	2
16	(Hungary)	13	Zsolt Kalmár	1	0	1	1
17	(Lithuania)	14	Linas Pilibaitis	1	0	0	1
18	(Hungary)	23	Tibor Tokody	0	1	0	1
19	(Serbia)	28	Vladimir Đorđević	0	0	1	1
20	(Hungary)	2	Ákos Takács	0	0	1	1
21	(Georgia (country))	25	Giorgi Kvilitaia	0	0	1	1
/	/	/	Own Goals	2	0	0	2
			TOTALS	57	31	22	110

=== Disciplinary record ===
Includes all competitive matches. Players with 1 card or more included only.

Last updated on 2 June 2013

Position	Nation	Number	Name	OTP Bank Liga		Hungarian Cup		League Cup		Total (Hu Total)	
Position	Nation	Number	Name	Yellow card	Red card	Yellow card	Red card	Yellow card	Red card	Yellow card	Red card
GK	(Serbia)	1	Saša Stevanović	0	0	1	0	0	0	1 (0)	0 (0)
DF	(Hungary)	2	Ákos Takács	2	0	1	0	0	0	3 (2)	0 (0)
MF	(Croatia)	3	Marko Dinjar	1	0	0	0	0	0	1 (1)	0 (0)
DF	(Slovakia)	5	Marián Had	2	0	0	0	0	0	2 (2)	0 (0)
FW	(Estonia)	6	Tarmo Kink	2	1	1	0	0	0	3 (2)	1 (1)
FW	(Hungary)	7	Balázs Farkas	0	0	0	0	1	0	1 (0)	0 (0)
MF	(Hungary)	8	Ádám Dudás	2	0	0	0	0	0	2 (2)	0 (0)
MF	(Slovenia)	9	Rok Kronaveter	5	1	2	0	0	0	7 (5)	1 (1)
FW	(Georgia (country))	10	Rati Aleksidze	1	0	0	0	0	0	1 (1)	0 (0)
FW	(Hungary)	11	Roland Varga	3	0	0	0	0	0	3 (3)	0 (0)
MF	(Serbia)	12	Nikola Trajković	5	0	2	0	1	0	8 (5)	0 (0)
MF	(Lithuania)	14	Linas Pilibaitis	3	0	0	1	2	0	5 (3)	1 (0)
DF	(Hungary)	15	Dániel Völgyi	4	1	1	0	0	1	6 (4)	1 (1)
DF	(Hungary)	16	Zoltán Lipták	2	1	2	0	0	0	4 (2)	1 (1)
MF	(Hungary)	17	Máté Pátkai	7	0	2	0	0	0	9 (7)	0 (0)
DF	(Hungary)	18	Ádám Lang	2	0	1	0	1	0	4 (2)	0 (0)
MF	(Serbia)	19	Nemanja Andrić	3	0	1	0	1	0	5 (3)	0 (0)
MF	(Romania)	20	Mihai Nicorec	1	0	2	0	0	0	3 (1)	0 (0)
MF	(Czech Republic)	21	Marek Střeštík	4	2	1	0	0	0	5 (4)	2 (2)
MF	(Czech Republic)	22	Michal Švec	5	0	2	0	0	0	7 (5)	0 (0)
DF	(Hungary)	23	Tibor Tokody	0	0	1	0	1	0	2 (0)	0 (0)
MF	(Bosnia and Herzegovina)	24	Đorđe Kamber	5	0	1	0	1	0	7 (5)	0 (0)
FW	(Georgia (country))	25	Giorgi Kvilitaia	0	1	0	0	0	0	0 (0)	1 (1)
DF	(Serbia)	28	Vladimir Đorđević	1	0	0	1	0	0	1 (1)	1 (0)
MF	(Hungary)	29	Tamás Koltai	3	0	0	0	0	0	3 (3)	0 (0)
GK	(Slovakia)	30	Péter Molnár	0	0	1	0	0	0	1 (0)	0 (0)
FW	(Hungary)	35	Csanád Novák	1	0	0	0	0	0	1 (1)	0 (0)
MF	(Hungary)	37	László Németh	0	0	0	0	1	0	1 (0)	0 (0)
			TOTALS	64	7	22	2	10	0	96 (64)	9 (7)

=== Overall ===
Games played	47 (30 OTP Bank Liga, 9 Hungarian Cup and 8 Hungarian League Cup)
Games won	29 (19 OTP Bank Liga, 7 Hungarian Cup and 3 Hungarian League Cup)
Games drawn	10 (7 OTP Bank Liga, 0 Hungarian Cup and 3 Hungarian League Cup)
Games lost	8 (4 OTP Bank Liga, 2 Hungarian Cup and 2 Hungarian League Cup)
Goals scored	110
Goals conceded	56
Goal difference	+54
Yellow cards	96
Red cards	9
Worst discipline	(Czech Republic) Marek Střeštík (5 (yellow card) , 2 (red card) )
Best result	12–0 (A) v Babóti SE - Hungarian Cup - 25-09-2012
Worst result	1–4 (A) v Debreceni VSC - OTP Bank Liga - 28-07-2012
Worst result	1–4 (A) v Egri FC - Ligakupa - 20-02-2013
Most appearances	(Czech Republic) Marek Střeštík (36 appearances)
Most appearances	(Serbia) Nemanja Andrić (36 appearances)
Most appearances	(Bosnia and Herzegovina) Đorđe Kamber (36 appearances)
Top scorer	(Serbia) Nemanja Andrić (21 goals)
Points	97/141 (68.79%)

Last updated: 2 June 2013

== Nemzeti Bajnokság I ==
=== Matches ===
28 July 2012 1	Debrecen	4–1	Győr	Debrecen, Hajdú-Bihar County
19:00 CEST	Sidibe 8', 26'; Szakály 10'; Kulcsár 45'	(Report)	Andrić 11'	Stadium: Stadion Oláh Gábor Út; Attendance: 5,000; Referee: (Hungary) Viktor Kassai

4 August 2012 2	Győr	1–1	Haladás	Győr, Győr-Moson-Sopron County
19:00 CEST	Kronaveter 27'	(Report)	Radó 55'	Stadium: ETO Park; Attendance: 2,500; Referee: (Hungary) Péter Solymosi

10 August 2012 3	Győr	2–1	Kaposvár	Győr, Győr-Moson-Sopron County
17:00 CEST	Pedro 82' (o.g.); Dina 85'	(Report)	Oláh 44'	Stadium: ETO Park; Attendance: 1,000; Referee: (Hungary) Krisztián Pánczél

18 August 2012 4	Siófok	2–3	Győr	Siófok, Somogy County
20:45 CEST	Dajić 2'; Nyári 87'	(Report)	Varga 23'; Kamber 57', 90'	Stadium: Révész Street Stadium; Attendance: 2,500; Referee: (Hungary) Mihály Fábián

25 August 2012 5	Győr	5–1	Kecskemét	Győr, Győr-Moson-Sopron County
18:30 CEST	Varga 8'; Koltai 31' (pen.); Střeštík 38'; Kamber 76'; Kronaveter 80'	(Report)	Jorginho 64'	Stadium: ETO Park; Attendance: 1,000; Referee: (Hungary) Szabolcs Szilasi

1 September 2012 6	Diósgyőr	0–3	Győr	Miskolc, Borsod-Abaúj-Zemplén County
14:00 CEST		(Report)	Koltai 41', 57', 66'	Stadium: DVTK Stadion; Attendance: 8,000; Referee: (Hungary) Zsolt Szabó

16 September 2012 7	Győr	1–0	Pécs	Győr, Győr-Moson-Sopron County
16:30 CEST	Koltai 35' (pen.)	(Report)		Stadium: ETO Park; Attendance: 3,500; Referee: (Hungary) Ádám Németh

23 September 2012 8	Videoton	0–1	Győr	Székesfehérvár, Fejér County
16:30 CEST		(Report)	Koltai 67'	Stadium: Sóstói Stadion; Attendance: 3,000; Referee: (Hungary) Mihály Fábián

28 September 2012 9	Győr	6–0	Pápa	Győr, Győr-Moson-Sopron County
17:00 CEST	Kronaveter 15', 85'; Varga 34', 38', 62'; Koltai 56'	(Report)		Stadium: ETO Park; Attendance: 3,200; Referee: (Hungary) Sándor Andó-Szabó

6 October 2012 10	Paks	0–0	Győr	Paks, Tolna County
16:00 CEST		(Report)		Stadium: Stadion PSE; Attendance: 1,500; Referee: (Hungary) Viktor Kassai

21 October 2012 11	Győr	3–2	Újpest	Győr, Győr-Moson-Sopron County
18:30 CEST	Varga 60'; Aarab 82' (o.g.); Kamber 90+2'	(Report)	Kabát 47', 56' (pen.)	Stadium: ETO Park; Attendance: 5,800; Referee: (Hungary) János Takács

28 October 2012 12	Ferencváros	1–1	Győr	Budapest, Pest County
18:30 CEST	Alempijević 62'	(Report)	Varga 7'	Stadium: Stadion Albert Flórián; Attendance: 6,100; Referee: (Hungary) Tamás Bognár

4 November 2012 13	Győr	0–0	Budapest Honvéd	Győr, Győr-Moson-Sopron County
18:30 CET		(Report)		Stadium: ETO Park; Attendance: 5,000; Referee: (Hungary) István Vad

10 November 2012 14	MTK Budapest	1–3	Győr	Budapest, Pest County
18:30 CET	Balajti 75'	(Report)	Varga 30'; Trajković 39'; Völgyi 65'	Stadium: Hidegkuti Nándor Stadium; Attendance: 1,500; Referee: (Hungary) Péter Solymosi

17 November 2012 15	Győr	2–1	Eger	Győr, Győr-Moson-Sopron County
14:00 CET	Kamber 12'; Koltai 15'	(Report)	Németh 32'	Stadium: ETO Park; Attendance: 2,500; Referee: (Hungary) Gábor Oláh

23 November 2012 16	Győr	2–0	Debrecen	Győr, Győr-Moson-Sopron County
14:00 CET	Varga 46'; Dudás 90+3'	(Report)		Stadium: ETO Park; Attendance: 6,000; Referee: (Hungary) Zsolt Szabó

1 December 2012 17	Haladás	1–1	Győr	Szombathely, Vas County
14:00 CET	Kalász 28'	(Report)	Trajković 21'	Stadium: Rohonci Street Stadium; Attendance: 3,500; Referee: (Hungary) Péter Solymosi

2 March 2013 18	Kaposvár	1–2	Győr	Kaposvár, Somogy County
18:30 CET	Oláh 76'	(Report)	Andrić 65'; Kink 90+1'	Stadium: Stadion Kaposvár Rákóczi; Attendance: 2,500; Referee: (Hungary) Zsolt Szabó

9 March 2013 19	Győr	2–1	Siófok	Győr, Győr-Moson-Sopron County
18:30 CET	Trajković 39', 61'	(Report)	Máté 65'	Stadium: ETO Park; Attendance: 4,000; Referee: (Hungary) Ádám Radványi

23 April 2013 20	Kecskemét	5–2	Győr	Kecskemét, Bács-Kiskun County
18:00 CEST	Mohl 4' (pen.); Varga 10'; Burgos 34'; Salami 71'; Balázs 90+1'	(Report)	Varga 24'; Kamber 36'	Stadium: Széktói Stadion; Attendance: 1,800; Referee: (Hungary) Zsolt Szabó

31 March 2013 21	Győr	2–0	Diósgyőr	Győr, Győr-Moson-Sopron County
18:30 CET	Varga 18'; Völgyi 68'	(Report)		Stadium: ETO Park; Attendance: 2,500; Referee: (Hungary) Péter Solymosi

5 April 2013 22	Pécs	0–2	Győr	Pécs, Baranya County
19:00 CEST		(Report)	Trajković 12'; Kronaveter 29'	Stadium: Stadion PMFC; Attendance: 2,000; Referee: (Hungary) Tamás Bognár

14 April 2013 23	Győr	1–1	Videoton	Győr, Győr-Moson-Sopron County
16:30 CEST	Kamber 68'	(Report)	Tóth 64'	Stadium: ETO Park; Attendance: 9,400; Referee: (Hungary) Viktor Kassai

20 April 2013 24	Pápa	1–1	Győr	Pápa, Veszprém County
18:30 CEST	Griffiths 90'	(Report)	Trajković 16'	Stadium: Stadion Várkerti; Attendance: 3,300; Referee: (Hungary) István Vad

26 April 2013 25	Győr	3–4	Paks	Győr, Győr-Moson-Sopron County
19:00 CEST	Völgyi 10'; Střeštík 30'; Kamber 39'	(Report)	Bartha 55'; Lázok 67'; Eppel 78'; Könyves 90'	Stadium: ETO Park; Attendance: 3,500; Referee: (Hungary) Zoltán Iványi

5 May 2013 26	Újpest	1–2	Győr	Budapest, Pest County
16:30 CEST	Vasiljević 30'	(Report)	Andrić 56'; Střeštík 90+3'	Stadium: Szusza Ferenc Stadium; Attendance: 3,548; Referee: (Hungary) Péter Solymosi

12 May 2013 27	Győr	1–0	Ferencváros	Győr, Győr-Moson-Sopron County
18:30 CEST	Völgyi 60' (pen.)	(Report)		Stadium: ETO Park; Attendance: 13,700; Referee: (Hungary) Ádám Farkas

19 May 2013 28	Budapest Honvéd	2–0	Győr	Budapest, Pest County
18:30 CEST	Hidi 62'; Lanzafame 82'	(Report)		Stadium: Bozsik Stadion; Attendance: 1,500; Referee: (Hungary) Sándor Andó-Szabó

25 May 2013 29	Győr	1–0	MTK Budapest	Győr, Győr-Moson-Sopron County
16:00 CEST	Trajković 20'	(Report)		Stadium: ETO Park; Attendance: 4,500; Referee: (Hungary) Zsolt Szabó

1 June 2013 30	Eger	2–3	Győr	Vác, Pest County
14:00 CEST	Németh 4'; Á. Farkas 73' (pen.)	(Report)	Kalmár 11'; Pilibaitis 18'; Pátkai 82'	Stadium: Stadion Városi Vác; Attendance: 200; Referee: (Hungary) Gergely Szőts

=== Classification ===
Pos	Team	Pld	W	D	L	GF	GA	GD	Pts	Qualification or relegation
1	Győr (C)	30	19	7	4	57	33	+24	64	Qualification for Champions League second qualifying round
2	Videoton	30	16	6	8	52	24	+28	54	Qualification for Europa League first qualifying round
3	Honvéd	30	15	7	8	50	36	+14	52	Qualification for Europa League first qualifying round
4	MTK	30	15	6	9	43	30	+13	51	
5	Ferencváros	30	13	10	7	51	36	+15	49	

Source: mlsz.hu (in Hungarian)
Rules for classification: 1st points; 2nd overall wins; 3rd goal difference; 4th head-to-head points; 5th head-to-head goal difference; 6th head-to-head away goals scored; 7th fair-play points; 8th drawing of lots
(C) Champions

=== Results summary ===
Overall								Home						Away					
Pld	W	D	L	GF	GA	GD	Pts	W	D	L	GF	GA	GD	W	D	L	GF	GA	GD
30	19	7	4	57	33	+24	64	11	3	1	32	12	+20	8	4	3	25	21	+4

Last updated: 2 June 2013.
Source: NB1

=== Results by round ===
Round	1	2	3	4	5	6	7	8	9	10	11	12	13	14	15	16	17	18	19	20	21	22	23	24	25	26	27	28	29	30
Ground	A	H	H	A	H	A	H	A	H	A	H	A	H	A	H	H	A	A	H	A	H	A	H	A	H	A	H	A	H	A
Result	L	D	W	W	W	W	W	W	W	D	W	D	D	W	W	W	D	W	W	L	W	W	D	D	L	W	W	L	W	W
Position	16	15	9	7	4	2	3	1	1	1	1	1	1	1	1	1	1	1	1	1	1	1	1	1	1	1	1	1	1	1

Updated to match(es) played on 2 June 2013. Source: Matches
A = Away; H = Home; W = Win; D = Draw; L = Loss

== Hungarian Cup ==
25 September 2012 Round 2	Babót	0–12	Győr	Babót, Győr-Moson-Sopron County
15:30 CEST		(Report)	Dudás 10', 34', 40'; Andrić 13', 17', 28'; Aleksidze 59', 64', 80'; Völgyi 63'; Nicorec 69'; Dina 75'	Stadium: Babóti Sportpálya; Attendance: 1,200; Referee: (Hungary) Gábor Kovács

31 October 2012 Round 3	Bölcske	2–5	Győr	Bölcske, Tolna County
12:30 CET	Rompos 68'; Szili 89' (pen.)	(Report)	Andrić 28', 30'; Dudás 43'; Střeštík 62' (pen.); Trajković 85'	Stadium: Városi Sporttelep; Attendance: 600; Referee: (Hungary) Tibor Farkas

20 November 2012 Round of 16 (1st leg)	Győr	4–0	Paks	Győr, Győr-Moson-Sopron County
16:30 CET	Dinjar 6' (pen.); Dudás 47', 76'; Pátkai 72'	(Report)		Stadium: ETO Park; Attendance: 1,000; Referee: (Hungary) Ádám Farkas

27 November 2012 Round of 16 (2nd leg)	Paks	2–3 (2–7 agg.)	Győr	Paks, Tolna County
15:00	Simon 19', 23'	(Report)	Kronaveter 8', 45'; Dudás 80'	Stadium: Stadion PSE; Attendance: 200; Referee: (Hungary) Zoltán Iványi

23 February 2013 Quarter-final (1st leg)	Budapest Honvéd	0–1	Győr	Budapest, Pest County
14:00 CET		(Report)	Kink 80' (pen.)	Stadium: Bozsik Stadion; Attendance: 0 Referee: (Hungary) Ádám Farkas

27 February 2013 Quarter-final (2nd leg)	Győr	2–0 (3–0 agg.)	Budapest Honvéd	Győr, Győr-Moson-Sopron County
18:00	Völgyi 71'; Kamber 76'	(Report)		Stadium: ETO Park; Attendance: 1,500; Referee: (Hungary) Tamás Bognár

17 April 2013 Semi-final (1st leg)	Videoton	0–2	Győr	Székesfehérvár, Fejér County
18:00 CEST		(Report)	Střeštík 31'; Tokody 67'	Stadium: Sóstói Stadion; Attendance: 2,000; Referee: (Hungary) Sándor Andó-Szabó

8 May 2013 Semi-final (2nd leg)	Győr	1–2 (3–2 agg.)	Videoton	Győr, Győr-Moson-Sopron County
18:00 CEST	Kink 90+2'	(Report)	Kovács 57'; Brachi 73' (pen.)	Stadium: ETO Park; Attendance: 3,000; Referee: (Hungary) Szabolcs Szilasi

22 May 2013 Final	Debrecen	2–1	Győr	Budapest, Pest County
20:00 CEST	Coulibaly 51', 86'	(Report)	Andrić 17'	Stadium: Bozsik Stadion; Attendance: 5,000; Referee: (Hungary) Viktor Kassai

== League Cup ==
=== Group stage ===
5 September 2012 1	Budapest Honvéd	0–3	Győr	Budapest, Pest County
18:00 CEST		(Report)	Aleksidze 6'; Dudás 29'; Andrić 88'	Stadium: Bozsik Stadion; Attendance: 200; Referee: (Hungary) Dániel Becséri

9 September 2012 2	Győr	5–1	Szombathely	Győr, Győr-Moson-Sopron County
16:30 CEST	Kronaveter 33', 53'; Dudás 59'; Aleksidze 67'; Střeštík 74'	(Report)	Tóth 49'	Stadium: ETO Park; Attendance: 600; Referee: (Hungary) István Vad

9 October 2012 3	Győr	5–1	Gyirmót	Győr, Győr-Moson-Sopron County
19:00 CEST	Nicorec 17'; Dudás 25'; Dinjar 30'; Andrić 32'; Kamber 78'	(Report)	Erős 51'	Stadium: ETO Park; Attendance: 600; Referee: (Hungary) József Berger

17 October 2012 4	Gyirmót	2–2	Győr	Győr, Győr-Moson-Sopron County
17:00 CEST	Kardos 16'; Nagy 81'	(Report)	Nicorec 20'; Dinjar 43'	Stadium: Ménfői úti Sporttelep; Attendance: 200; Referee: (Hungary) Zsolt Szabó

13 November 2012 5	Szombathely	2–1	Győr	Szombathely, Vas County
16:00 CET	Andorka 60', 89'	(Report)	Kalmár 28'	Stadium: Rohonci úti Stadion; Attendance: 100; Referee: (Hungary) Norbert Kiss

5 December 2012 6	Győr	2–2	Budapest Honvéd	Győr, Győr-Moson-Sopron County
13:00 CET	Đorđević 22'; Kronaveter 72'	(Report)	Odia 37'; Diaby 83'	Stadium: ETO Park; Attendance: 500; Referee: (Hungary) Szabolcs Szilasi

==== Classification ====
Pos	Team	Pld	W	D	L	GF	GA	GD	Pts	Qualification
1	Győr	6	3	2	1	18	8	+10	11	Advance to knockout phase
2	Honvéd	6	3	2	1	13	9	+4	11	Advance to knockout phase
3	Gyirmót	6	1	2	3	11	18	−7	5	
4	Haladás	6	1	2	3	11	18	−7	5	

Rules for classification: 1) points; 2) goal difference; 3) number of goals scored.

=== Knockout phase ===
20 February 2013 Quarter-final (1st leg)	Eger	4–1	Győr	Eger, Heves County
13:00 CET	Horváth 40', 45', 75'; Takács 88' (o.g.)	(Report)	Takács 63'	Stadium: Szentmarjay Tibor Városi Stadion; Attendance: 200; Referee: (Hungary) Zsolt Szabó

6 March 2013 Quarter-final (2nd leg)	Győr	3–3 (4–7 agg.)	Eger	Győr, Győr-Moson-Sopron County
13:30	Andrić 5'; Kvilitaia 26'; Kronaveter 79'	(Report)	Németh 36' (pen.); Koós 49', 64'	Stadium: ETO Park; Attendance: 300; Referee: (Hungary) József Erdős
