= 2025–26 FC Nitra season =

Slovak football club season

FC Nitra
2025–26 season
- Owner: FC Nitra a. s.
- Chairman: Pavol Ondriš (until 17 September); Radoslav Bratko (from 17 September)
- Head Coach: Igor Slezák (until 14 April); Andrej Štefanka (from 15 April)
- Stadium: Štadión pod Zoborom, Nitra
- 4. Liga: 1th (promoted)
- Slovak Cup: Round of 16
- Top goalscorer: League: Daniel Rapavý (11); All: Daniel Rapavý (11)
- Highest home attendance: 2,050 vs FK Železiarne Podbrezová (Slovak Cup, 15 November 2025)
- Lowest home attendance: 272 vs TJ Tatran Oravské Veselé (Slovak Cup, 30 September 2025)
- Biggest win: 6–0 vs AFC Nové Mesto (4. Liga, 9 August 2025)
- Biggest defeat: 2–3 vs FK Železiarne Podbrezová (Slovak Cup, 15 November 2025)
Home colours	Away colours

The 2025–26 season was FC Nitra's third consecutive season in the fourth tier of Slovak football. During the season, the club won the fourth tier and secured promotion to the third tier. The club also competed in the Slovak Cup, reaching the Round of 16.

== First-team squad ==
As of 13 june 2026

Note: Flags indicate national team as defined under FIFA eligibility rules; some limited exceptions apply. Players may hold more than one non-FIFA nationality.

No.	Pos.	Nation	Player
1	GK	SVK	René Žákech
3	DF	SVK	Dominik Straňák
4	DF	GHA	Kojo Amankwaa
6	MF	SVK	Samuel Stovička
7	MF	SVK	Róbert Pich
8	DF	SVK	Lukáš Štetina (captain)
9	FW	SVK	Adrián Mokoš
10	FW	SVK	Jozef Sombat
11	MF	SVK	Frederik Domasta
12	FW	NGR	John Bakari Danga
13	MF	COL	Jaime Andres Gamboa Cayola
14	DF	SVK	Pavol Grác
15	FW	GAM	Mamadou Gingally
16	DF	SVK	Denis Pánsky
17	MF	SVK	Marek Výbošťok
18	MF	SVK	Michal Klec

No.	Pos.	Nation	Player
19	FW	SVK	Daniel Rapavý
22	DF	SVK	Andrej Kadlec
23	FW	NGR	Abdullahi Aliyu Adam
25	MF	SVK	Lukáš Štrauch
28	MF	UKR	Artem Okhtyrov
32	FW	SVK	Ľubomír Šoky
33	GK	SVK	Ľubomír Krátky
34	DF	SVK	Lukáš Greššák
46	GK	SVK	Štefan Senecký
48	FW	SVK	Patrik Kuruc
77	FW	SVK	Martin Košťál
80	MF	SVK	Mário Baláž
—	FW	BRA	Brayan Brown Oliveira Vilas Boas
—	FW	NGR	Abdullahi Haruna Adamu
—	FW	SLE	Ishmael Dumbuya
—	MF	SVK	Marek Michalička

== Coaching staff ==
As of 13 june 2026

Staff	Job title
(Slovakia) Igor Slezák	Manager (until 14 April)
(Slovakia) Andrej Štefanka	Manager (from 15 April)
(Slovakia) Marek Tomiš	Assistant manager (from 15 April)
(Slovakia) Michal Kinči	Assistant manager (until 14 April)
(Slovakia) Miroslav Reischl	Assistant manager (from 15 April)
(Slovakia) Štefan Senecký	Goalkeeping coach
(Slovakia) Viliam Mečár	Team Doctor
(Slovakia) Peter Januška	Physiotherapist
(Slovakia) Ján Andraško	Physiotherapist

== Transfers and contracts ==
=== Released / out of contract ===
Date from	Pos.	Nationality	Player	Subsequent club	Joined date	Ref.
30 june 2025	DF	(Slovakia)	Jozef Kotula	TJ Slovan Čeľadice	1 july 2025	

=== In ===
Date from	Pos.	Nationality	Player	From	Fee	Ref.
17 June 2025	GK	(Slovakia)	Ľubomír Krátky	(Slovakia) TJ Družstevník Veľké Ludince	Free	
2 July 2025	MF	(Ukraine)	Artem Okhtyrov	(Ukraine) FC Dinaz Vyshhorod	Free	
16 July 2025	MF	(Slovakia)	Marek Výbošťok	(Slovakia) MŠK Žilina	Free	
17 July 2025	DF	(Slovakia)	Lukáš Greššák	(Slovakia) FC ViOn Zlaté Moravce	Free	
17 July 2025	DF	(Slovakia)	Denis Pánsky	(Slovakia) TJ Družstevník Veľké Ludince	Free	
17 July 2025	MF	(Slovakia)	Lukáš Štrauch	(Slovakia) FK Tempo Partizánske	Free	
17 July 2025	MF	(Slovakia)	Marek Michalička	(Slovakia) ŠKF Sereď	Free	
17 July 2025	MF	(Slovakia)	Mário Baláž	(Slovakia) FKM Nové Zámky	Free	
18 July 2025	DF	(Slovakia)	Pavol Grác	(Slovakia) FC ViOn Zlaté Moravce	Free	
18 July 2025	FW	(Slovakia)	Adam Homola	(Slovakia) FC ViOn Zlaté Moravce	Free	
21 July 2025	DF	(Slovakia)	Lukáš Štetina	(Slovakia) FC Spartak Trnava	Free	
21 July 2025	FW	(Slovakia)	Ľubomír Šoky	(Slovakia) TJ Družstevník Veľké Ludince	Free	
22 July 2025	GK	(Slovakia)	René Žákech	(Slovakia) FC Petržalka	Free	
30 July 2025	MF	(Slovakia)	Róbert Pich	(Slovakia) FC Spartak Trnava	Free	
30 July 2025	FW	(Nigeria)	Abdullahi Haruna Adamu	(Czech Republic) FC Slavia Karlovy Vary	Free	
2 August 2025	MF	(Slovakia)	Michal Klec	(Poland) Chełmianka Chełm	Free	
7 August 2025	FW	(Sierra Leone)	Ishmael Dumbuya	(Lithuania) FK Minija	Free	
25 September 2025	DF	(Slovakia)	Andrej Kadlec	(Czech Republic) FK Mladá Boleslav	Free	
8 January 2026	FW	(Slovakia)	Daniel Rapavý	(Slovakia) MŠK Púchov	Free	
23 January 2026	FW	(Nigeria)	Abdullahi Aliyu Adam	(Slovakia) ŠKF Sereď	Free	
28 January 2026	DF	(Slovakia)	Dominik Straňák	(Slovakia) MŠK Púchov	Free	
9 February 2026	FW	(The Gambia)	Mamadou Gingally	(The Gambia) Stingers Football Academy	Free	
20 February 2026	GK	(Slovakia)	Štefan Senecký	(Slovakia) FC MOSAP Klasov	Free	
8 March 2026	FW	(Nigeria)	John Bakari Danga	(Nigeria) GBS Football Academy	Free	
31 March 2026	FW	(Slovakia)	Martin Košťál	(Slovakia) FC ViOn Zlaté Moravce	Free	

=== Out ===
Date from	Pos.	Nationality	Player	To	Fee	Ref.
1 July 2025	MF	(Slovakia)	Patrik Peťovský	(Slovakia) FTC Trakovice	Free	
9 July 2025	FW	(Slovakia)	Matúš Loskot	(Slovakia) FC Pata	Free	
9 July 2025	MF	(Slovakia)	Ján Lošonský	(Slovakia) ŠKF Sereď	Free	
17 July 2025	MF	(Slovakia)	Ľuboš Janek	(Slovakia) FKM Nové Zámky	Free	
19 July 2025	DF	(Slovakia)	Adam Dunda	(Czech Republic) FK Hodonín	Free	
19 July 2025	MF	(Slovakia)	Tomáš Kurti	(Austria) SK Pama	Free	
20 July 2025	DF	(Slovakia)	Marko Ševčík	(Slovakia) MŠK Novohrad Lučenec	Free	
21 July 2025	MF	(Slovakia)	Peter Patrik Flašík	(Slovakia) TJ Družstevník Veľké Ludince	Free	
10 October 2025	GK	(Slovakia)	Dávid Bobček	(England) Skelmersdale United FC	Free	
18 February 2026	FW	(Brazil)	Brayan Brown Oliveira Vilas Boas	(Slovakia) FK Kolárovo	Free	

=== Loans in ===
Date from	Pos.	Nationality	Player	From	Until	Ref.
23 January 2026	DF	(Slovakia)	Samuel Stovička	(Slovakia) FK Baník Lehota pod Vtáčnikom	30 June 2026	
27 March 2026	FW	(Slovakia)	Patrik Kuruc	(Slovakia) MFK Dukla Banská Bystrica	30 June 2026	

=== Loans out ===
Date from	Pos.	Nationality	Player	To	Until	Ref.
9 July 2025	FW	(Slovakia)	Boris Bruckner	(Slovakia) FC Pata	7 March 2026	
9 July 2025	MF	(Slovakia)	Maximilian Kubička	(Slovakia) FC Pata	30 June 2026	
11 July 2025	MF	(Colombia)	Samuel Perez Aponte	(Slovakia) TJ Štart Nitrianske Hrnčiarovce	30 June 2026	
8 August 2025	MF	(Slovakia)	Jakub Kočí	(Slovakia) TJ Madunice	30 June 2026	
24 January 2026	MF	(Colombia)	Jaime Andres Gamboa Cayola	(Slovakia) ŠKF Sereď	30 June 2026	
29 January 2026	MF	(Slovakia)	Mário Baláž	(Slovakia) FKM Nové Zámky	30 June 2026	
9 February 2026	FW	(Slovakia)	Adam Homola	(Slovakia) TJ Imeľ	30 June 2026	
12 February 2026	GK	(Slovakia)	Erik Trautenberger	(Slovakia) FK Rača	30 June 2026	
3 March 2026	MF	(Slovakia)	Marko Bača	(Slovakia) FK Slovan Levice	30 June 2026	
8 March 2026	FW	(Slovakia)	Boris Bruckner	(Slovakia) ŠK Kmeťovo	30 June 2026	

== Friendlies ==
Win Draw Loss

=== Pre-season ===
5 July 2025 Friendly	(Czech Republic) Slavia Kroměříž	0–2	FC Nitra	Kroměříž
14:00 CEST		Report	Vilas Boas 65', 85'	Stadium: Stadion Jožky Silného

12 July 2025 Friendly	FC Nitra	1–1	Slovan Bratislava U21	Nitra
10:30 CEST	Šoky 88'	Report		Stadium: Štadión pod Zoborom

16 July 2025 Friendly	FC Nitra	2–0	FC Topoľčany	Nitra
19:00 CEST	Vilas Boas (x); Štetina (x)	Report		Stadium: Štadión pod Zoborom

19 July 2025 Friendly	FK Pohronie	1–0	FC Nitra	Žiar nad Hronom
14:00 CEST	Kutka 25'	Report		Stadium: Mestský štadión

=== Mid-season ===
17 January 2026 Friendly	Baník Prievidza	5–3	FC Nitra	Nováky
14:00 CET			Sombat 2', 8'; Výbošťok 67'	Stadium: Nováky Stadium

24 January 2026 Friendly	Spartak Myjava	0–1	FC Nitra	Myjava
10:00 CET			Klec 37'	Stadium: Stadium Myjava

31 January 2026 Friendly	FC Nitra	3–2	Baník Lehota pod Vtáčnikom	Nitra
15:00 CET	Amankwaa (x); Straňák (x); Rapavý (x)			Stadium: Štadión pod Zoborom

7 February 2026 Friendly	FC Nitra	3–2	Slovan Galanta	Nitra
11:00 CET	Rapavý (x); Klec (x); Sombat (x)			Stadium: Štadión pod Zoborom

14 February 2026 Friendly	FC Nitra	9–2	MFK Nová Baňa	Nitra
14:00 CET	Štrauch (x); Domasta (x); Adam (x); Rapavý (x); Danga (x); Šoky (x); Mokoš (x); Sombat (x)			Stadium: Štadión pod Zoborom

20 February 2026 Friendly	FC Topoľčany	0–6	FC Nitra	Topoľčany
18:00 CET			Straňák (x); Pich (x); Klec (x); Šoky (x); Mokoš (x); Rapavý (x)	Stadium: Štadión Vojtecha Schotterta

1 March 2026 Friendly	FC Nitra	6–2	NŠK 1922 Bratislava	Nitra
12:30 CET	Pich (x); Rapavý (x); Sombat (x); Klec (x)			Stadium: Štadión pod Zoborom

== Competitions ==
=== 4. liga ===
==== League table (Western Group) ====
Pos	Team	Pld	W	D	L	GF	GA	GD	Pts	Qualification or relegation
1	FC Nitra (C, P)	30	25	4	1	82	15	+67	79	Promotion to 3. liga
2	TJ Slavoj Boleráz	30	21	3	6	65	35	+30	66	
3	Spartak Dubnica	30	19	5	6	59	35	+24	62	
4	PFK Piešťany	30	16	5	9	48	30	+18	53	
5	FC Pata	30	15	6	9	51	36	+15	51	
6	OŠK Trenčianske Stankovce	30	13	7	10	60	52	+8	46	
7	ŠK Blava	30	12	4	14	45	51	−6	40	
8	TJ Imeľ	30	11	6	13	52	48	+4	39	
9	FK Slovan Levice	30	10	8	12	40	49	−9	38	
10	OFK Trebatice	30	8	10	12	40	53	−13	34	
11	AFC Nové Mesto	30	8	8	14	39	57	−18	32	
12	ŠKF Sereď (R)	30	9	4	17	32	50	−18	31	Withdrawal from the competition
13	FK Horná Krupá	30	8	5	17	38	55	−17	29	
14	TJ Nafta Gbely	30	7	6	17	33	59	−26	27	
15	ŠK Šoporňa	30	7	6	17	39	60	−21	27	
16	ŠK LR CRYSTAL (R)	30	6	3	21	29	67	−38	21	Relegation to 5. liga

Updated to match(es) played on unknown. Source: Sportnet
(C) Champions; (P) Promoted; (R) Relegated

==== Matches ====
Win Draw Loss Fixtures

2 August 2025 1	FC Nitra	2–0	FK Horná Krupá	Nitra
17:00 CEST	Štetina 19'; Michalička 33'	Report	Sudin (yellow card) 37'; Dobiš (yellow card) 70'	Stadium: Štadión pod Zoborom; Attendance: 555

9 August 2025 2	AFC Nové Mesto	0–6	FC Nitra	Nové Mesto nad Váhom
17:00 CEST	Hodál (yellow card) 17'; Letuan (yellow card) 55'; Brotto Junior (red card) 65'	Report	Pich 18' (pen.), 52'; Michalička 45'; Štrauch 77'; Sombat 83'; Mokoš 85'	Stadium: Areál AFC Považan; Attendance: 300

16 August 2025 3	FC Nitra	3–2	PFK Piešťany	Nitra
17:00 CEST	Mokoš 8', 56'; Haruna Adamu 81'; Štetina (yellow card) 38'; Domasta (yellow card) 38'	Report	Štefanka 35'; Strelec 60'; Gula (yellow card) 10'; Guemache (yellow card) 38'; Ferenčík (yellow card) 63'; Štefanka (red card) 38'	Stadium: Štadión pod Zoborom; Attendance: 560

24 August 2025 4	OŠK Trenčianske Stankovce	0–4	FC Nitra	Trenčianske Stankovce
17:00 CEST	Držík (yellow card) 48'; Kleščík (yellow card) 62'; Gergel (yellow card) 73'; Repa (yellow card) 82'	Report	Sombat 5'; Klec 54'; Štrauch 67'; Vilas Boas 87'; Cayola (yellow card) 40'; Klec (yellow card) 42'; Štetina (yellow card) 73'; Vilas Boas (yellow card) 90'	Stadium: Oddychové centrum Attendance: 250

30 August 2025 5	FC Nitra	1-1	FC Pata	Nitra
17:00 CEST	Vilas Boas 39'; Cayola (yellow card) 65'; Haruna Adamu (yellow card) 80'	Report	Damasceno De Assis 4'; Ramirez Palacios (yellow card) 42'; Baláži (yellow card) 56'; Loskot (yellow card) 87'; Peseky (yellow card) 90'	Stadium: Štadión pod Zoborom; Attendance: 810

6 September 2025 6	FC Nitra	4-2	OFK Trebatice	Nitra
16:00 CEST	Pich 4', 63'; Mokoš 50'; Klec 51'	Report	Kravárik 45'; Bartošek 72'; Varga (yellow card) 55'; Bartošek (yellow card) 68'; Blaško (yellow card) 76'; Kravárik (yellow card) 90'	Stadium: Štadión pod Zoborom; Attendance: 430

11 September 2025 7	TJ Imeľ	0-0	FC Nitra	Imeľ
17:00 CEST	Csontos (yellow card) 38'; Parra Mora (yellow card) 61'; Beke (yellow card) 78'	Report	Cayola (yellow card) 75'	Stadium: Futbalový štadión TJ Imeľ; Attendance: 300

20 September 2025 8	FC Nitra	2-0	ŠK Blava	Nitra
17:00 CEST	Sombat 7'; Cayola 42'	Report	Janso (yellow card) 35'; Zemko (yellow card) 81'	Stadium: Štadión pod Zoborom; Attendance: 405

27 September 2025 9	ŠK LR CRYSTAL	0-5	FC Nitra	Lednické Rovne
15:30 CEST	Červený (yellow card) 31'; Hunana (yellow card) 32'; Krčmárik (red card) 53'	Report	Pich 4'; Mokoš 6'; Štetina 73'; Klec 88', 89'; Senecký (yellow card) 31'; Domasta (yellow card) 53'; Pich (yellow card) 53'	Stadium: Lednické Rovne Stadium; Attendance: 118

4 October 2025 10	FC Nitra	6-0	ŠKF Sereď	Nitra
17:00 CEST	Cayola 38', 41'; Sombat 74' (pen.); Pich 84'; Mokoš 89'; Dumbuya 90'; Sombat (yellow card) 67'	Report	Vajdík (yellow card) 73'	Stadium: Štadión pod Zoborom; Attendance: 321

11 October 2025 11	Spartak Dubnica	1-2	FC Nitra	Dubnica nad Váhom
15:00 CEST	Cyprian 78'; Kubiš (yellow card) 67'	Report	Sombat 24', 39'	Stadium: Mestský futbalový štadión Attendance: 912

18 October 2025 12	FC Nitra	3-1	ŠK Šoporňa	Nitra
17:00 CEST	Klec 38'; Štetina 43'; Turoň 6' (o.g.); Domasta (yellow card) 70'; Grác (yellow card) 81'	Report	Korec 83'; Duran (yellow card) 22'	Stadium: Štadión pod Zoborom; Attendance: 350

25 October 2025 13	TJ Nafta Gbely	0-3	FC Nitra	Gbely
14:00 CET	Bogdalík (yellow card) 25'	Report	Šoky 17'; Štrauch 70'; Baláž 78'; Cayola (yellow card) 61'	Stadium: Stadium Gbely; Attendance: 100

1 November 2025 14	FC Nitra	2-0	TJ Slavoj Boleráz	Nitra
16:00 CET	Výbošťok 52'; Dumbuya 90'; Amankwaa (yellow card) 18'; Greššák (yellow card) 70'; Domasta (yellow card) 82'; Baláž (yellow card) 88'; Slezák (yellow card) 89'; Andraško (yellow card) 90'	Report		Stadium: Štadión pod Zoborom; Attendance: 1,220

9 November 2025 15	FK Slovan Levice	0-4	FC Nitra	Levice
13:30 CET		Report	Cayola 30'; Sombat 35', 60'; Výbošťok 52'	Stadium: Futbalový štadión Levice; Attendance: 350

7 March 2026 16	FK Horná Krupá	1-2	FC Nitra	Horná Krupá
17:00 CET	Humel 56'; Humel (yellow card) 49'; Olšinský (yellow card) 53'; Drozda (yellow card) 72'	Report	Klec 42'; Rapavý 85'; Adam (yellow card) 74'; Kadlec (yellow card) 86'	Stadium: Stadium Horná Krupá; Attendance: 350

14 march 2026 17	FC Nitra	3-0	AFC Nové Mesto	Nitra
17:00 CET	Pánsky 40'; Šoky 43'; Rapavý 90'; Štetina (yellow card) 55'; Pánsky (yellow card) 72'	Report	Brotto Junior (yellow card) 85'	Stadium: Štadión pod Zoborom; Attendance: 903

21 march 2026 18	PFK Piešťany	0-2	FC Nitra	Piešťany
15:00 CET	Seko (yellow card) 18'; Kusý (yellow card) 28'; Sloboda (yellow card) 38'	Report	Výbošťok 36'; Pich 57'; Greššák (yellow card) 81'	Stadium: PFK Piešťany stadium Attendance: 463

28 March 2026 19	FC Nitra	0-0	OŠK Trenčianske Stankovce	Nitra
17:00 CEST	Greššák (yellow card) 55'	Report	Ondrášek (yellow card) 55'; Sedláček (yellow card) 86'; Repa (yellow card) 89'	Stadium: Štadión pod Zoborom; Attendance: 412

5 April 2026 20	FC Pata	1-2	FC Nitra	Pata
15:30 CEST	Peseky 64'; Ferentsyk (yellow card) 53'; Lipovský (yellow card) 59'	Report	Straňák 54'; Rapavý 83'; Pánsky (yellow card) 47'; Grác (yellow card) 62'; Rapavý (yellow card) 87'; Krátky (yellow card) 89'	Stadium: Pata Stadium; Attendance: 1,150

12 April 2026 21	OFK Trebatice	1-0	FC Nitra	Trebatice
15:30 CEST	Bartošek 68'; Cuadrado Chiquillo (yellow card) 13'; Bartoš (yellow card) 19'; Valo (yellow card) 27'; Bartošek (yellow card) 29'; Danko (yellow card) 80' (yellow-red card) 89'	Report	Štetina (yellow card) 29'; Pich (yellow card) 34'; Krátky (yellow card) 68'; Adam (yellow card) 71'; Greššák (yellow card) 77'; Straňák (yellow card) 86'	Stadium: Futbalové ihrisko Attendance: 250

18 April 2026 22	FC Nitra	1-0	TJ Imeľ	Nitra
17:00 CEST	Kadlec 27'; Greššák (yellow card) 86'	Report	Darázs (yellow card) 82'	Stadium: Štadión pod Zoborom; Attendance: 653

25 April 2026 23	ŠK Blava	0-1	FC Nitra	Jaslovské Bohunice
11:00 CEST	Janso (yellow card) 38'; Machovič (yellow card) 45'; Lančarič (yellow card) 65'	Report	Adam 15'	Stadium: Štadión Jaslovské Bohunice; Attendance: 268

2 May 2026 24	FC Nitra	2-0	ŠK LR CRYSTAL	Nitra
17:00 CEST	Danga 14'; Klec 52'; Štetina (yellow card) 90'	Report	Tomilin (yellow card) 68'	Stadium: Štadión pod Zoborom; Attendance: 520

9 May 2026 25	ŠKF Sereď	3-3	FC Nitra	Sereď
16:30 CEST	Takács 41'; Faleye 53'; Delinčák 90'; Vajdík (yellow card) 86'	Report	Pánsky 10'; Výbošťok 31'; Rapavý 75'; Amankwaa (yellow card) 55'; Okhtyrov (yellow card) 81'; Krátky (yellow card) 90'	Stadium: Štadión Sereď; Attendance: 323

16 May 2026 26	FC Nitra	4-1	Spartak Dubnica	Nitra
17:00 CEST	Výbošťok 33'; Adam 41', 60'; Rapavý 54'	Report	Cyprian 86'; Miakiš (yellow card) 31'	Stadium: Štadión pod Zoborom; Attendance: 450

23 May 2026 27	ŠK Šoporňa	0-2	FC Nitra	Šoporňa
17:00 CEST	Paľo (yellow card) 33'; Korec (yellow card) 53'; Jánošík (yellow card) 77'	Report	Rapavý 7'; Štetina 35'; Domasta (yellow card) 49'; Reischl (yellow card) 80'; Danga (yellow card) 89'	Stadium: Stadium Šoporňa; Attendance: 371

30 May 2026 28	FC Nitra	4-0	TJ Nafta Gbely	Nitra
15:30 CEST	Rapavý 8', 10'; Greššák 24'; Stovička 85'; Greššák (yellow card) 76'	Report	Lukášik (yellow card) 36'; Bibik (yellow card) 76'	Stadium: Štadión pod Zoborom; Attendance: 453

7 June 2026 29	TJ Slavoj Boleráz	0-4	FC Nitra	Boleráz
17:00 CEST	Juhás (yellow card) 84'; Jánošík (yellow card) 90'	Report	Kuruc 27'; Košťál 56'; Klec 75', 89'; Pánsky (yellow card) 90'	Stadium: Futbalový štadión Attendance: 200

13 June 2026 30	FC Nitra	5-1	FK Slovan Levice	Nitra
17:00 CEST	Danga 34'; Rapavý 38', 52', 62'; Štrauch 82'	Report	Arboleda 57'	Stadium: Štadión pod Zoborom; Attendance: 1,333

=== Slovak Cup ===
Win Loss Fixtures

27 July 2025 1R	ŠK Bešeňov	0–5	FC Nitra	Bešeňov
	Kling (yellow card) 55'	Report	Michalička 7', 78' *Amankwaa 45' *Šoky 65' *Sombat 73' *Cayola (yellow card) 10'	Stadium: Stadium Bešeňov; Attendance: 350

20 August 2025 2R	FC Nitra	1-0 (3–2 p)	MFK Bytča	Nitra
	Baláž (yellow card) 36' *Cayola (yellow card) 59' (yellow-red card) 65' *Šoky (yellow card) 71'	Report	Zimka (yellow card) 76'	Stadium: Štadión pod Zoborom; Attendance: 350

30 September 2025 3R	FC Nitra	4-0	TJ Tatran Oravské Veselé	Nitra
	Šoky 27', 45' *Výbošťok 64' *Pánsky 86' *Štetina (yellow card) 56' *Pánsky (yellow card) 77'	Report	Dopater (yellow card) 23' *Pisarčík (yellow card) 66' *Chovanec (yellow card) 84'	Stadium: Štadión pod Zoborom; Attendance: 272

15 October 2025 4R	FC Nitra	2-1	MŠK Námestovo	Nitra
	Pánsky 45' *Róbert Pich 83' *Cayola (yellow card) 37' *Pánsky (yellow card) 37'	Report	Snovák 68' *Fukas (red card) 30'	Stadium: Štadión pod Zoborom; Attendance: 380

15 November 2025 R16	FC Nitra	2-3	FK Železiarne Podbrezová	Nitra
	Pánsky 37' *Jozef Sombat 64' *Grác (yellow card) 39' *Baláž (yellow card) 67' *Šoky (yellow card) 84'	Report	Galčík 42', 62' *Šiler (penalty missed) 54 *Kováčik 56' *Niňaj (yellow card) 36' *Sanusi (yellow card) 67' *Paraj (yellow card) 73' *Šiler (yellow card) 90+4'	Stadium: Štadión pod Zoborom; Attendance: 2,050

== Statistics ==
=== Goalscorers ===
Rank	No.	Pos.	Nat.	Player	4. Liga	Slovak Cup	Total
1	19	FW	(Slovakia)	Daniel Rapavý	11	0	11
2	10	FW	(Slovakia)	Jozef Sombat	8	2	10
3	18	MF	(Slovakia)	Michal Klec	9	0	9
4	7	FW	(Slovakia)	Róbert Pich	7	1	8
5	9	FW	(Slovakia)	Adrián Mokoš	6	0	6
5	17	MF	(Slovakia)	Marek Výbošťok	5	1	6
6	16	DF	(Slovakia)	Denis Pánsky	2	3	5
6	32	FW	(Slovakia)	Ľubomír Šoky	2	3	5
7	8	DF	(Slovakia)	Lukáš Štetina	4	0	4
7	25	MF	(Slovakia)	Lukáš Štrauch	4	0	4
7	13	MF	(Colombia)	Jaime Andres Gamboa Cayola	4	0	4
7	28	MF	(Slovakia)	Marek Michalička	2	2	4
8	23	FW	(Nigeria)	Abdullahi Aliyu Adam	3	0	3
9	12	FW	(Nigeria)	John Bakari Danga	2	0	2
9		FW	(Brazil)	Brayan Brown Oliveira Vilas Boas	2	0	2
9		FW	(Sierra Leone)	Ishmael Dumbuya	2	0	2
10	22	DF	(Slovakia)	Andrej Kadlec	1	0	1
10	80	MF	(Poland)	Mário Baláž	1	0	1
10	3	DF	(Slovakia)	Dominik Straňák	1	0	1
10	77	FW	(Slovakia)	Martin Košťál	1	0	1
10		FW	(Nigeria)	Abdullahi Haruna Adamu	1	0	1
10	34	DF	(Slovakia)	Lukáš Greššák	1	0	1
10	48	FW	(Slovakia)	Patrik Kuruc	1	0	1
10	6	MF	(Slovakia)	Samuel Stovička	1	0	1
10	4	DF	(Ghana)	Kojo Amankwaa	0	1	1
Own goals					1	0	0
Totals					82	13	95
