= Matúš Čonka =

Slovak footballer

Personal information
- Full name: Matúš Čonka
- Date of birth: 15 October 1990 (age 36)
- Place of birth: Košice, Czechoslovakia
- Height: 1.73 m (5 ft 8 in)
- Position: Left back

Team information
- Current team: TJ Slavoj Boleráz
- Number: 19

Youth career
- Lokomotíva Košice
- Košice

Senior career*
Years	Team	Apps	(Gls)
2009–2011	Košice	53	(1)
2012–2014	Slavia Prague	37	(1)
2014–2019	Spartak Trnava	125	(3)
2019–2020	Karviná	26	(0)
2020–2024	ViOn Zlaté Moravce	87	(3)
2024–	TJ Slavoj Boleráz	0	(0)

International career
2008–2009	Slovakia U19	10	(0)
2010–2012	Slovakia U21	17	(1)
2017	Slovakia (unofficial)	1	(0)
- * Club domestic league appearances and goals as of 28 June 2024

Matúš Čonka (born 15 October 1990) is a Slovak footballer who plays for TJ Slavoj Boleráz as a left back.

== Club career ==
Čonka, product of Lokomotíva Košice youth squads, made his league debut for MFK Košice against Banská Bystrica on 18 July 2009 at the age of 18. He scored his first goal in a 1–1 draw against Žilina on 17 July 2011. In January 2012, he joined Czech club Slavia Prague.

He was transferred to Spartak Trnava in June 2014. He made his league debut for them on 13 July 2014 against Zlaté Moravce.

== International career ==
Čonka was called up for two unofficial friendly fixtures held in Abu Dhabi, UAE, in January 2017, against Uganda (1–3 loss) and Sweden, by his former coach Ján Kozák, who coached for approximately 1 year, while Čonka played for Košice. Čonka made his debut against Sweden, playing the full length of the match, which Slovakia lost 0–6.

== Honours ==
Spartak Trnava

- Fortuna Liga: 2017–18
- Slovnaft Cup: 2018–19
