= Babót =

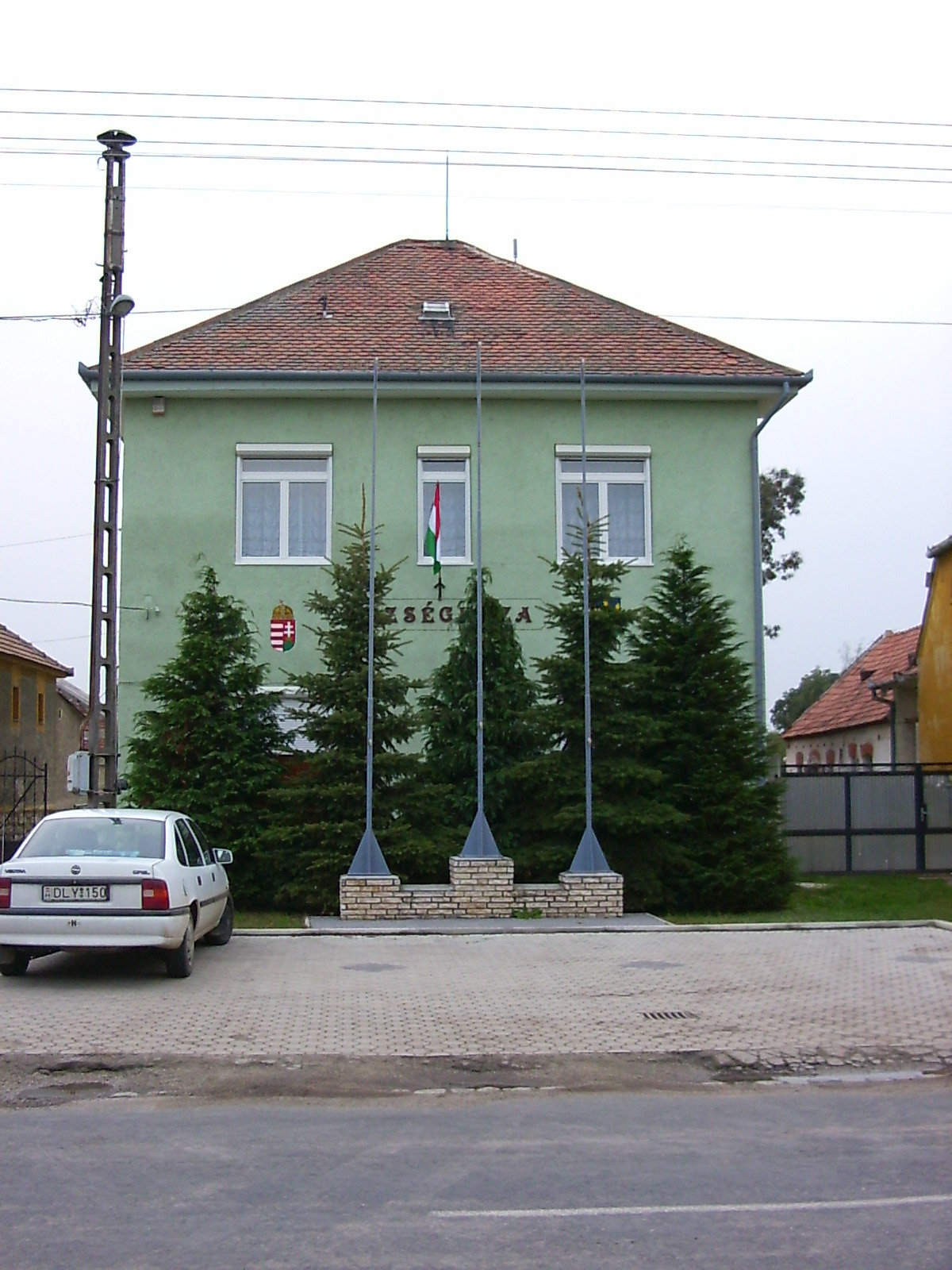
- Village hall

- Flag Coat of arms

- Location of Győr-Moson-Sopron county in Hungary

- Location of Babót
- Coordinates: 47.57487°N 17.07560°E
- Country: Hungary
- County: Győr-Moson-Sopron

Area
  - Total: 21.65 km^{2} (8.36 sq mi)

Population (2004)
  - Total: 1,148
  - Density: 53.02/km^{2} (137.3/sq mi)
- Time zone: UTC+1 (CET)
  - Summer (DST): UTC+2 (CEST)
- Postal code: 9351
- Area code: 96

Babót is a village in Győr-Moson-Sopron county, Hungary. In 1869, the Pintér-Hancz cross was erected on the road leading to Babót near Veszkény and became a local landmark. The cross was restored in 2023 after it was broken into pieces in a storm.

The natural bathing spot in Babót is Poseidon Camp beach spa.

A statue of Tertullián Kiss, the founder and headteacher of the local school, was dedicated in Babót in May 2024.
