= Kristián Koštrna =

Slovak footballer (born 1993)

Personal information
- Date of birth: 15 December 1993 (age 32)
- Place of birth: Hlohovec, Slovakia
- Height: 1.78 m (5 ft 10 in)
- Positions: Right-back; centre-back

Team information
- Current team: Spartak Trnava
- Number: 24

Youth career
- 2004–2010: Spartak Trnava
- 2010–2014: Wolverhampton Wanderers

Senior career*
Years	Team	Apps	(Gls)
2014	TJ Slavoj Boleráz	7	(4)
2015–2016	Parndorf 1919	30	(0)
2016–2017	Pirin Blagoevgrad	31	(0)
2017–2019	DAC Dunajská Streda	60	(2)
2020	Dinamo București	8	(0)
2021–2024	Spartak Trnava	90	(1)
2024–2025	Železiarne Podbrezová	30	(0)
2025–	Spartak Trnava	32	(1)

International career
2008	Slovakia U15	1	(0)
2009	Slovakia U16	1	(0)
2009	Slovakia U17	1	(0)
2011	Slovakia U19	3	(0)
2012–2013	Slovakia U21	3	(0)
- * Club domestic league appearances and goals as of 21 November 2026

Kristián Koštrna (born 15 December 1993) is a Slovak footballer who plays for Spartak Trnava as a defender.

== Club career ==
=== Wolverhampton ===
He began his football career at Spartak Trnava, where he came from his native town of Hlohovec. He passed the club's youth selections and went to England for trials at the age of 15. He signed a 2.5-year youth contract with Wolverhampton Wanderers and gradually went through the academy, reserve team and played matches for the A-team. In July 2011, he completed two pre-season friendly matches.

In May 2013, he signed a new one-year contract with the club, with a one-year option. After the 2012–13 season, Wolverhampton were relegated to League One.

=== Boleráz ===
In September 2014, he was close to a transfer to the fourth-league Slovak club TJ Slavoj Boleráz. He eventually transferred to Slavoj, even though he had offers from the Polish and Czech leagues. Koštrna has played in Boleráz until the end of September 2014. He played seven games for the club and scored four goals, contributing to a victory against OK Častkovce and against Nová Dubnica.

In January 2015, he left for the third-division Austrian club SC/ESV Parndorf. Koštrna then transferred to the Bulgarian First League side Pirin Blagoevgrad, signing a 2 year long contract.

=== DAC Dunajská Streda ===
In 2017, Koštrna signed for Slovak club DAC Dunajská Streda. He finished 3rd with the club in the 2017/18 season, which was the highest ever finish for DAC at the time. A year later, DAC improved, finishing in 2nd place. Koštrna contributed to this by scoring a goal in the last match of the season, when he opened the score from a penalty in the 10th round of the superstructure in the group for the title to 1–0. Dunajská Streda defeated Zemplín Michalovce 5–0 at home. At the start of the 2019/20 season, Koštrna became DAC's captain due to the absence of injured captain Zsolt Kalmár. On 25 August, Koštrna equalized the score in a match against FC Nitra with a header in the 39th minute of the match. DAC turned the score around and won 2–1. He played 60 games before leaving to Romanian side CS Dinamo București.

In January 2020, he signed a contract with Romanian Liga I club Dinamo București. He was released by Dinamo only eight months later.

=== Spartak Trnava ===
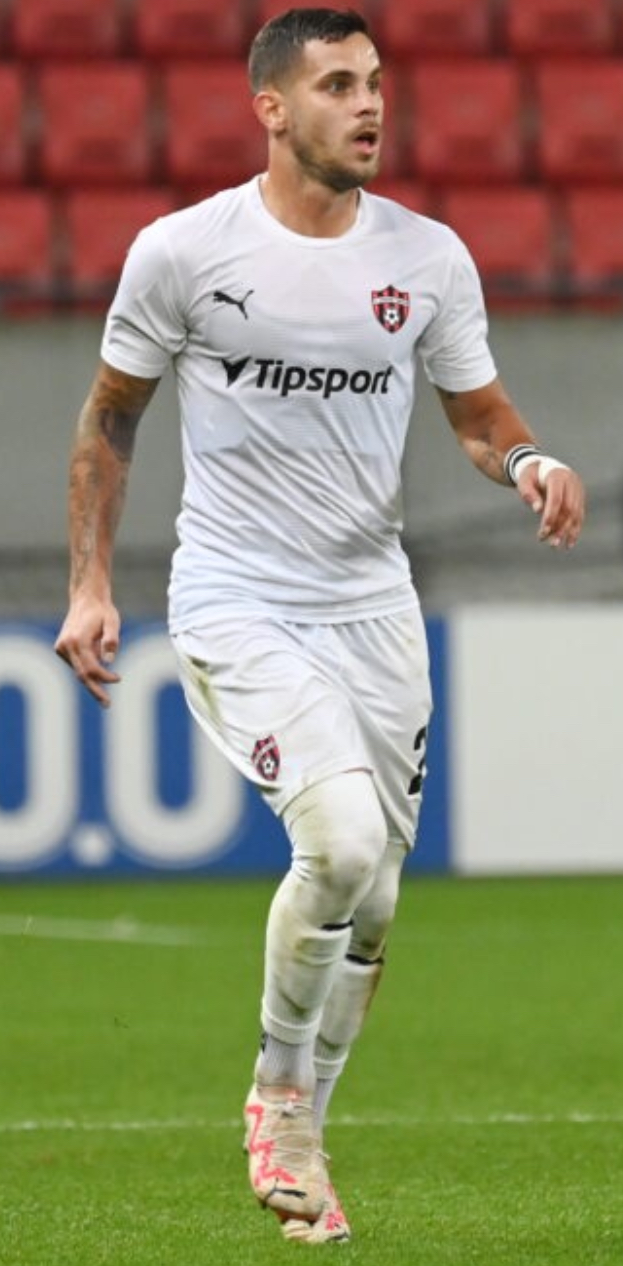
Koštrna playing against FC Nordsjælland.

In 2021, it was announced that Koštrna would be returning to Spartak Trnava. He played the full 90” minutes on his debut in a 4:2 win against FC ViOn Zlaté Moravce. Koštrna played in every game in the club's 2023–24 UEFA Europa Conference League campaign. He won player of the season for Spartak in 2023.

=== Podbrezova ===
Koštrna joined FK Železiarne Podbrezová on 27 June 2024. He played his first game for his new club in a 0:0 draw against MŠK Žilina, getting a yellow card. In his first season at Podbrezova he played 30 times. He was the most used player in the league playing 2,854 minutes.

=== Return to Spartak ===
On 28 June 2025, it was announced that Koštrna would be yet again returning to his former club FC Spartak Trnava, signing a two-year contract. On his debut for Spartak, he played the full 90” minutes in a 1:0 home defeat to BK Häcken in the 1st round of qualification to the Europa League.

== International career ==
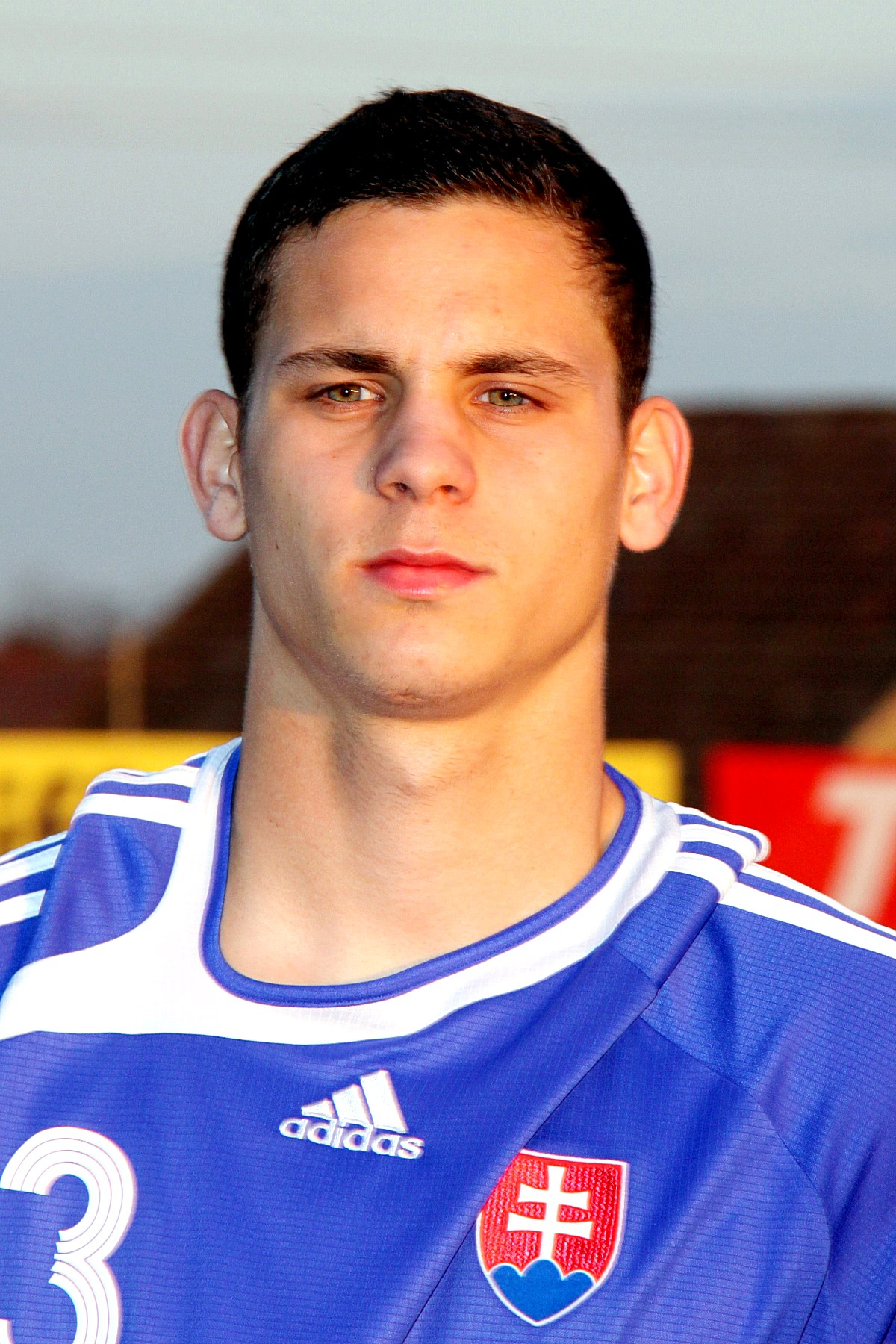
Koštrna in 2012

Koštrna has played for the Slovakia national team at youth level.

In October 2019 Koštrna was called to Slovakia national team for Euro 2020 qualifying match against Wales. However, on 7 October 2019 it was announced that he would be replaced by Boris Sekulić due to an ankle injury.

== Honours ==
Spartak Trnava

- Slovak Cup: 2021–22, 2022–23
