= Mihai Dina =

Romanian footballer

Personal information
- Date of birth: 15 September 1985 (age 41)
- Place of birth: Craiova, Romania
- Height: 1.87 m (6 ft 2 in)
- Position: Attacking midfielder

Senior career*
Years	Team	Apps	(Gls)
2002–2003	Extensiv Craiova	8	(0)
2003–2005	FC Caracal	38	(4)
2005–2011	FC U Craiova	157	(29)
2011	Mioveni	10	(0)
2012	Petrolul Ploieşti	6	(0)
2012	Győri ETO	8	(1)
2013	Poli Timișoara	4	(0)
2013–2014	Aris Limassol	31	(10)
2014–2015	Concordia Chiajna	38	(9)
2016	AEL Limassol	5	(0)
2016	Râmnicu Vâlcea	13	(5)
2017	Metalul Reșița	12	(1)
2017	Othellos Athienou	4	(0)
2018–2019	FC U Craiova	12	(2)
2019	Atletic Bradu	9	(6)
Total		355	(67)
- * Club domestic league appearances and goals

Mihai Dina (born 15 September 1985) is a Romanian former professional footballer who played as a midfielder.
