= Oliver Janso =

Slovak footballer

Personal information
- Full name: Oliver Janso
- Date of birth: 8 October 1993 (age 33)
- Place of birth: Myjava, Slovakia
- Height: 1.75 m (5 ft 9 in)
- Position: Left-back

Team information
- Current team: TJ Slavoj Boleráz

Youth career
- Spartak Myjava
- 2008–2009: AAC Sparta Trenčín
- 2009–2012: Senica

Senior career*
| Years | Team | Apps | (Gls) |
| 2012–2013 | Senica | 0 | (0) |
| 2012–2013 | → Nové Mesto (loan) | | |
| 2014 | Slavia Orlová-Lutyně | | |
| 2014 | Senica | 0 | (0) |
| 2014 | → Nové Mesto (loan) | 13 | (0) |
| 2015 | Ritzing | | |
| 2015 | Slovan Galanta | | |
| 2016–2018 | Spartak Trnava | 37 | (1) |
| 2019 | Ústí nad Labem | 8 | (0) |
| 2019 | Partizán Bardejov | 9 | (0) |
| 2020 | Komárno | 15 | (0) |
| 2021 | Podhale Nowy Targ | 35 | (3) |
| 2022–2024 | ŠKF Sereď | | |
| 2024– | TJ Slavoj Boleráz | | |
- * Club domestic league appearances and goals as of 23:11, 7 October 2024 (UTC)

Oliver Janso (born 8 October 1993) is a Slovak professional footballer who plays as a left-back for Slovak club TJ Slavoj Boleráz.

== Club career ==
=== Spartak Trnava ===
Janso made his league debut for Spartak Trnava against Senica on 24 September 2016.

== Honours ==
Spartak Trnava

- Fortuna Liga: 2017–18
