= TJ Slavoj Boleráz =

Slovak football club

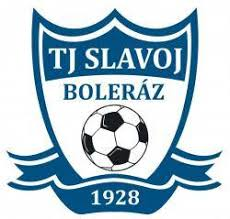
- TJ Slavoj Boleraz logo.
- Founded: 1928
- Ground: Futbalový štadión TJ Slavoj Boleráz, Boleráz
- Capacity: 483
- Chairman: Ľubomír Krišica
- Manager: Roman Vavro
- League: 4. liga
- Website: https://slavojboleraz.webnode.sk/
Home colours

TJ Slavoj Boleráz (commonly referred to as Slavoj Boleráz or simply Boleráz) is a Slovak association football club based in Boleráz in the Trnava District. The club was founded in 1928 and currently plays in the 4. Liga, the fourth level of the Slovak football pyramid.

== History ==
=== Early years ===
The history of the club in Boleráz dates back to 1928, when football was played on a makeshift field near the church. During this period, a football club was created by the chairman Ignác Deutsch under the name Boleráz Sports Club.

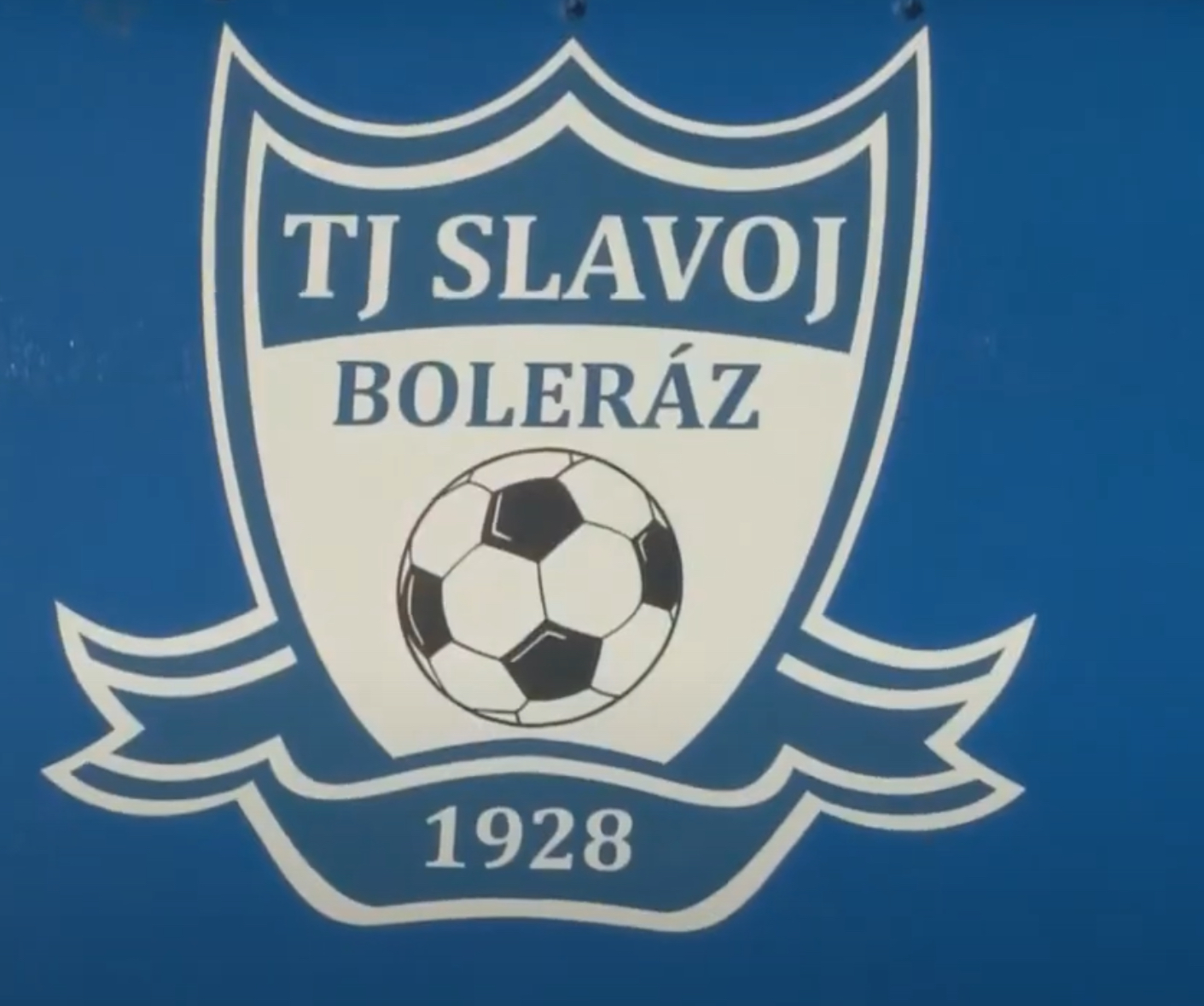
Slavoj Boleraz logo on the gates to the ground.

The first period brought development, the players sought their own financial security, football enjoyed great popularity and players from surrounding villages also came to play it. The Second World War period was not kind to the club, but after the liberation it was restored again. Gradually, work was also done related to the completion of the sports complex and the fencing of the entire complex. In the eighties, a barrier wall, railings around the playing field, benches and a garage for a bus were also built.

=== Recent years ===
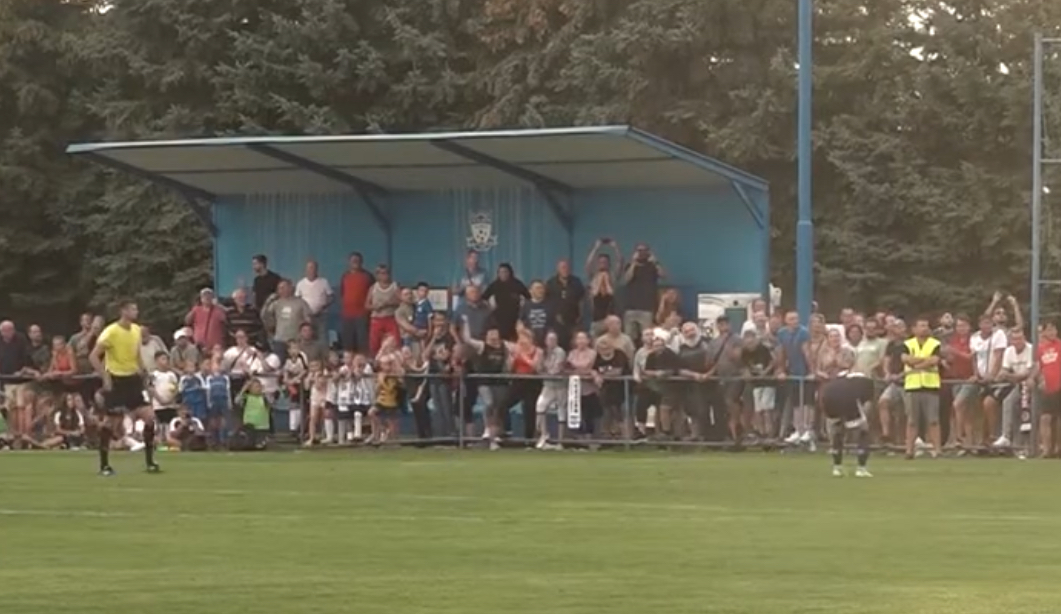
Boleraz stand against Spartak Trnava.

In 2022, Boleráz were drawn with first division side FC Spartak Trnava, in the Slovak Cup. They made history by drawing the game and taking it to penalties, where they lost 4:2. There were 1100 spectators at the Boleráz stadium.

Today, TJ Slavoj Boleráz is a participant in the fourth league of the west, which also represents the highest competition in which the A-team has operated so far. The club is headed by Ľubomír Krišica together with a ten-member committee.

== Stadium ==
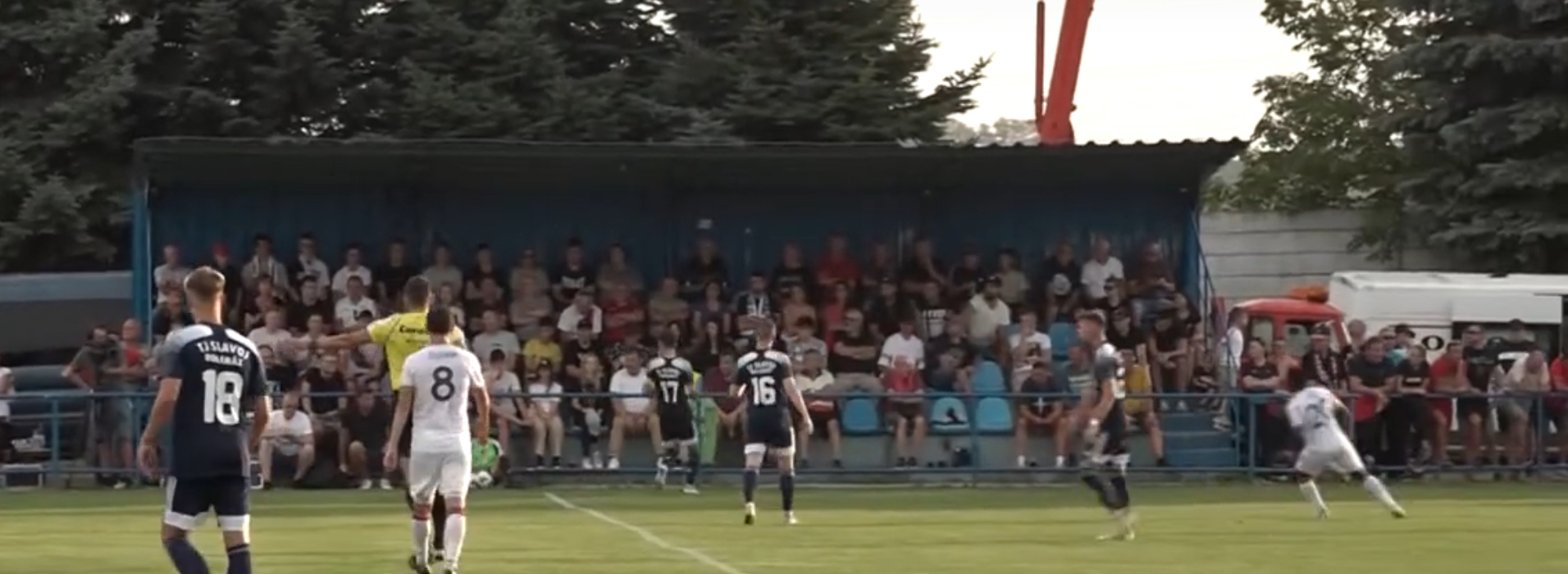
One of the stands in a match against Spartak Trnava.

The football complex is located near the elementary school and its dominant feature are the eight blue stands around the playing field. The club has tried in recent years to renovate and build everything in its power in the complex, especially in terms of finances. The complex also has a training pitch. The stadium has 483 seats.

== Squad ==
As of 19 March Note: Flags indicate national team as defined under FIFA eligibility rules; some limited exceptions apply. Players may hold more than one non-FIFA nationality.

No.	Pos.	Nation	Player
—	GK	SVK	Ľuboš Kamenár
—	GK	SVK	Michal Hrivnak
—	GK	SVK	Andrej Jedlicka
—	GK	SVK	Lukas Vasko
—	GK	SVK	Bruno Ondrus
—	DF	SVK	Boris Yuhas
—	DF	SVK	Thomas Hlavna
—	DF	BIH	Miljan Milinkovic
—	DF	SVK	Peter Brestovansky
—	DF	SVK	Miroslav Danis
—	DF	SVK	Matus Conka
—	DF	SVK	Jakub Krč
—	MF	SVK	Jan Magdolen
—	MF	SVK	Kristián Vangel

No.	Pos.	Nation	Player
—	MF	SVK	Marco Kollar
—	MF	SVK	Matej Jakabovik
—	MF	SVK	Marek Planeta
—	MF	SVK	Peter Lisak
—	MF	SVK	Peter Kozak
—	MF	SVK	Samuel Buoc
—	MF	SVK	Oliver Janso
—	MF	SVK	Filip Tomovic
—	FW	SVK	Daniel Martinka
—	FW	SVK	Juraj Sekera
—	FW	SVK	Martin Orihel
—	FW	SVK	Adam Konecne
—	FW	SVK	Marek Danis
—	FW	SVK	Samuel Akbar

For recent transfers see:

== Player records ==
Most goals

Name	Apps	Goals
Bohumil Vőrőš	217	149
Marek Daniš	352	137
Pavol Mackovčín	284	136
Pavol Mackovčín ml.	200	126
Martin Daniš	277	111

== Notable players ==
Had international caps for their respective countries. Players whose name is listed with a bold represented their countries while playing for Boleraz.

Past (and present) players.

- (Slovakia) Kristián Koštrna
- (Slovakia) Ľuboš Kamenár
- (Slovakia) Tomáš Bagi
- (Slovakia) Matúš Čonka
