= István Matetits =

Hungarian footballer

Personal information
- Date of birth: 6 September 1993 (age 33)
- Place of birth: Kapuvár, Hungary
- Position: Forward

Team information
- Current team: Kapuvári SE
- Number: 7

Youth career
- 2003–2013: Győr

Senior career*
Years	Team	Apps	(Gls)
2012–2015	Győr	1	(0)
2012–2015	→ Győr II	24	(6)
2014–2015	→ Ajka (loan)	7	(0)
2015–2016	UFC Pamhagen		
2016–2019	SC Aspang		
2019–	Kapuvári SE	107	(78)
- * Club domestic league appearances and goals as of 20:38, 19 September 2023 (UTC)

István Matetits (born 6 September 1993) is a Hungarian football player who plays for Kapuvári SE.
