= Veszkény =

- Village
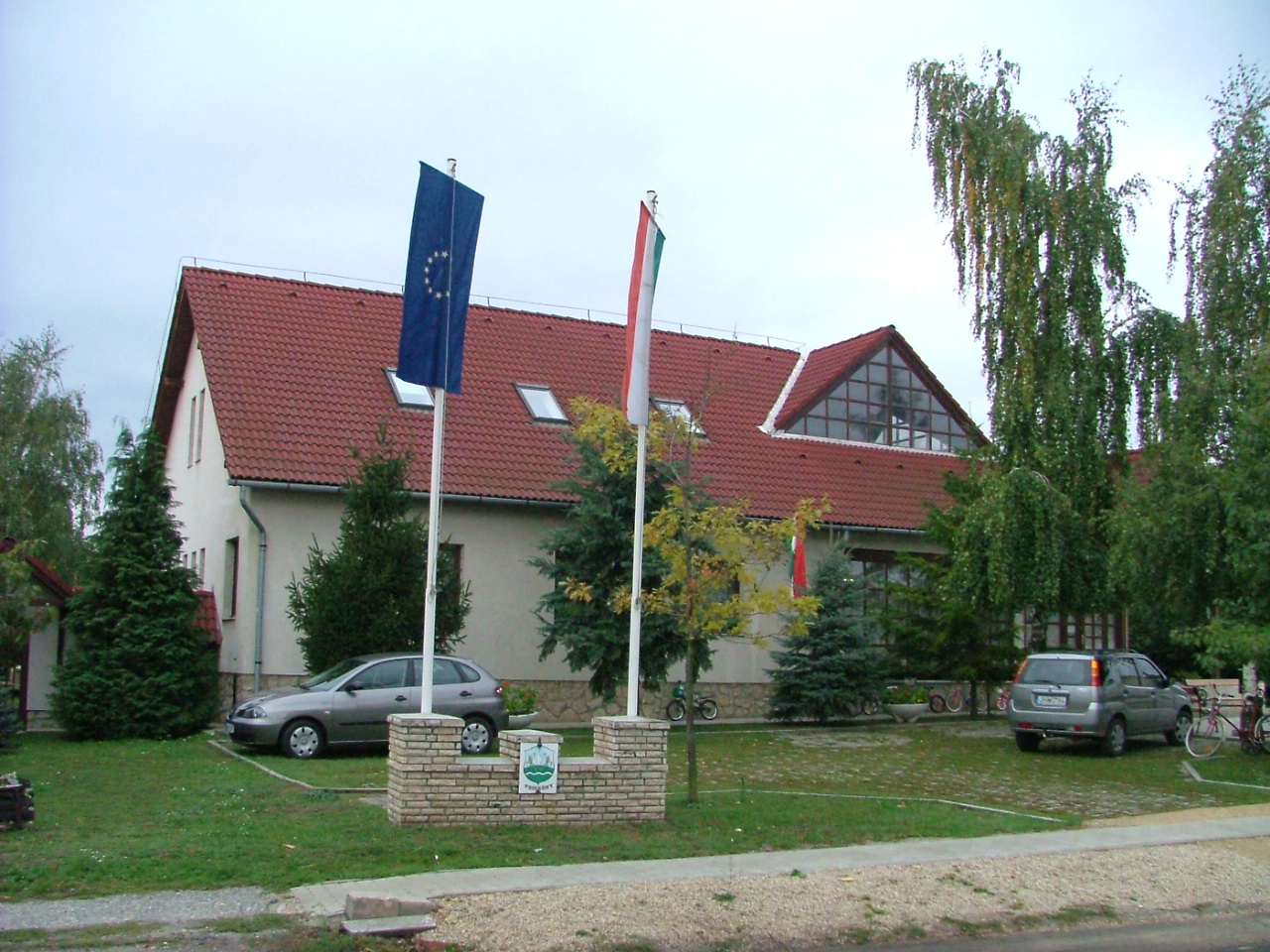
- Village hall

- Flag Coat of arms

- Location of Veszkény
- Coordinates: 47.6000°N 17.0833°E
- Country: Hungary
- County: Győr–Moson–Sopron

Area
  - Total: 10.35 km^{2} (4.00 sq mi)

Population (2010)
  - Total: 911
  - Density: 88.0/km^{2} (228/sq mi)
- Time zone: UTC+1 (CET)
  - Summer (DST): UTC+2 (CEST)
- Postal code: 9352
- Area code: 96

Veszkény is a village in Győr–Moson–Sopron County, Hungary.

In the 19th century a small Jewish community lived in the village, many of whose members were murdered in the Holocaust
