= Ľuboš Kamenár =

Slovak footballer

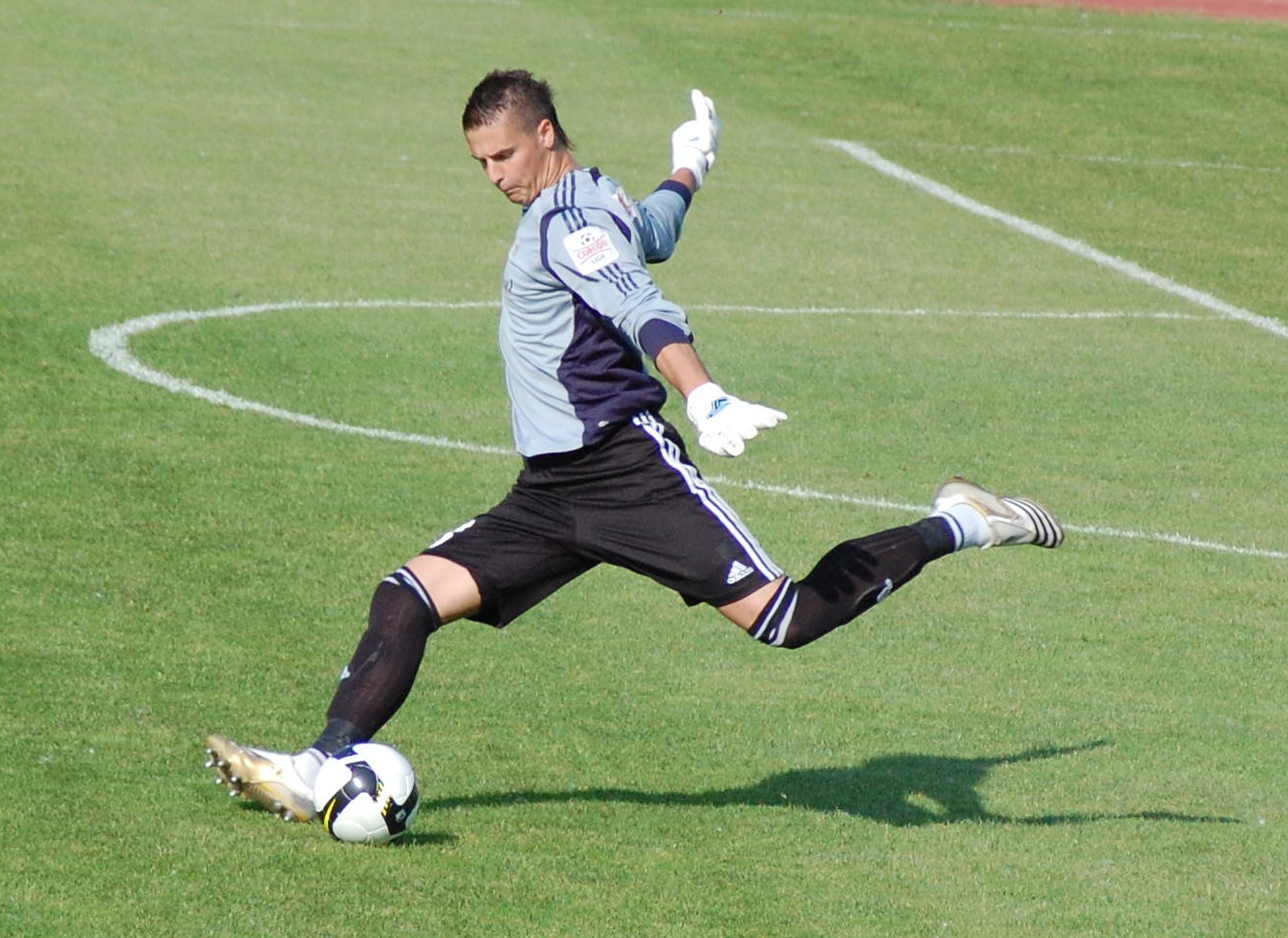
- Kamenár with Petržalka in 2009

Personal information
- Date of birth: 17 June 1987 (age 39)
- Place of birth: Trnava, Czechoslovakia
- Height: 1.93 m (6 ft 4 in)
- Position: Goalkeeper

Team information
- Current team: TJ Slavoj Boleráz
- Number: 22

Youth career
- Spartak Trnava

Senior career*
Years	Team	Apps	(Gls)
2004	Spartak Trnava	5	(0)
2005–2009	Petržalka	100	(0)
2009–2012	Nantes	36	(0)
2011	→ Sivasspor (loan)	1	(0)
2011	→ Sparta Prague (loan)	0	(0)
2012	→ Spartak Trnava (loan)	12	(0)
2012–2013	→ Celtic (loan)	0	(0)
2013–2015	ETO Győr	37	(0)
2015–2016	Spartak Trnava	19	(0)
2016–2017	Śląsk Wrocław	9	(0)
2016–2017	Śląsk Wrocław II	8	(0)
2017–2018	Vasas Budapest	21	(0)
2018–2019	Mladá Boleslav	2	(0)
2019	Petržalka	7	(0)
2020–2024	Spartak Trnava	6	(0)
2024–	TJ Slavoj Boleráz	0	(0)

International career
2004–2006	Slovakia U19	15	(0)
2007–2008	Slovakia U21	10	(0)
2008–2009	Slovakia	2	(0)
- * Club domestic league appearances and goals as of 18 May 2024

Ľuboš Kamenár (born 17 June 1987) is a Slovak professional footballer who plays as a goalkeeper for TJ Slavoj Boleráz.

He previously played for Spartak Trnava.

== Club career ==
Kamenár made his first football steps in his hometown club Spartak Trnava. He went through all the youth squads, until reaching the senior team, where he made five appearances.

In February 2005, he signed for Artmedia Petržalka and in his first season there, he won the league although he was not first choice goalkeeper and played only one match. He qualified with Artmedia to the 2005–06 UEFA Champions League group stage but he did not get a chance. He became a first goalkeeper in the second half of the 2005–06 season when Juraj Čobej had to undergo treatment for a brain tumor. He won the domestic league again in 2007–08.

On 2 July 2009, the 22-year-old Kamenár left Artmedia Petržalka to sign a five-year contract for French Nantes. He played 35 matches in his first season and finished 15th with Nantes. In the next season he lost his position in the club and moved on a half-year loan to Sivasspor. There he made only one appearance against Manisaspor. In June 2011, he signed for Sparta Prague on loan. He played 11 matches for the Sparta reserve squad. On 21 January 2012, he signed a half-year loan with option for his hometown club Spartak Trnava. Kamenar completed a season-long loan move to Scottish giants Celtic on 31 August 2012 with the option to make the move permanent, but he eventually joined Hungarian side ETO Győr until 2016.

== International career ==
Kamenár played his first international match for Slovakia in a 3–1 away 2010 FIFA World Cup qualifying win over San Marino on 11 October 2008. In that match, he had conceded the sole goal that San Marino managed to score in the campaign, when he was beaten by San Marino's top scorer and most caped player Andy Selva, at the end of the first half. He recorded his other international cap in a friendly match against Chile, in a 1–2 defeat at pod Dubňom in November 2009.

== Honours ==
Petržalka

- Slovak First League: 2004–05, 2007–08
- Slovak Cup: 2007–08
- Slovak Super Cup: 2005

ETO Győr

- Nemzeti Bajnokság I: 2012–13
- Szuperkupa: 2013

Spartak Trnava

- Slovak Cup: 2021–22, 2022–23
