= Boleráz =

- Municipality
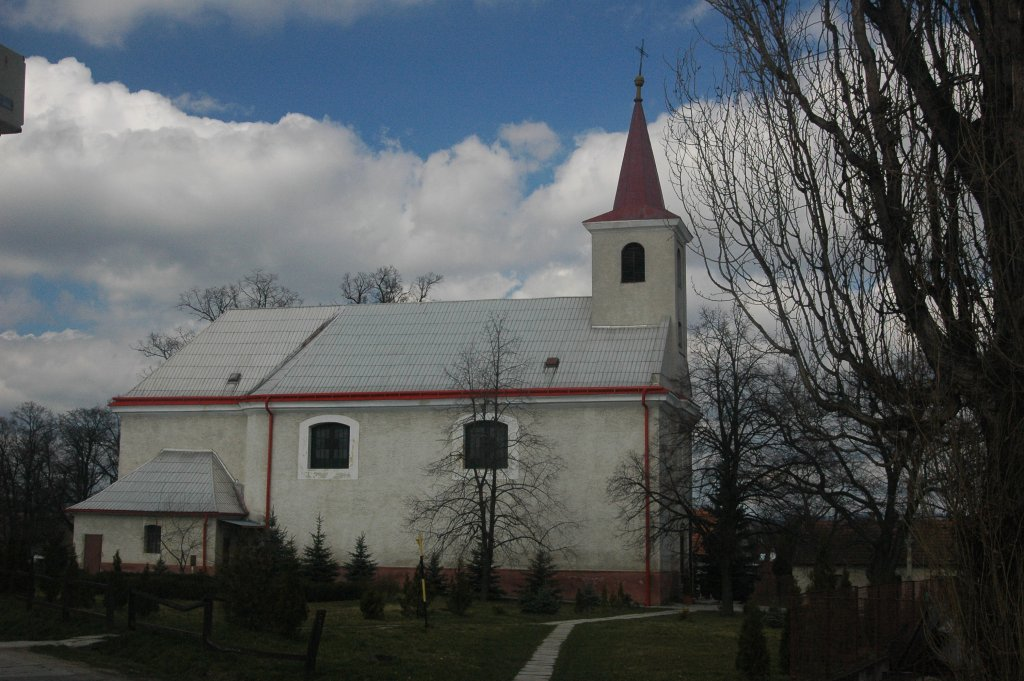

- Flag

- Location of Boleráz in the Trnava Region Location of Boleráz in Slovakia
- Coordinates: 48.47°N 17.50°E
- Country: Slovakia
- Region: Trnava Region
- District: Trnava District
- First mentioned: 1240

Area
  - Total: 25.46 km^{2} (9.83 sq mi)
- Elevation: 172 m (564 ft)

Population (2025)
  - Total: 2,393
- Time zone: UTC+1 (CET)
  - Summer (DST): UTC+2 (CEST)
- Postal code: 919 08
- Area code: +421 33
- Vehicle registration plate (until 2022): TT
- Website: www.boleraz.sk

Boleráz (Hungarian: Bélaház) is a municipality of Trnava District in the Trnava region of Slovakia.

== Geography ==
The municipality lies at an altitude of 172 metres (564 ft) and covers an area of 25.46 km^{2} (9.83 sq mi) (2025).

== Early history ==
The first signs of settlement are known from the Old Stone Age. The fortress "Zámok" (Castle), which has not been preserved, also dates from this period. The characteristic archaeological finds of the entire region, the so-called Boleráz Group, date from the Bronze Age.

== Population ==
Population statistic (10 years)
Year	1995	2005	2015	2025
Count	1980	2076	2300	2393
Difference		+4.84%	+10.78%	+4.04%

Population statistic
Year	2024	2025
Count	2395	2393
Difference		−0.08%

It has a population of 2393 people (31 December 2025).

=== Ethnicity ===
Census 2021 (1+ %)
Ethnicity	Number	Fraction
Slovak	2295	96.83%
Not found out	56	2.36%
Total	2370	

In year 2021 was 2370 people by ethnicity 2295 as Slovak, 56 as Not found out, 16 as Czech, 16 as Hungarian, 9 as Romani, 7 as Russian, 5 as German, 4 as Serbian, 4 as Polish, 2 as Other, 1 as Jewish, 1 as Rusyn, 1 as Romanian and 1 as Croatian.

Note on population: The difference values of population numbers in the table "Population statistic" and in the sections "Ethnicity" & "Religion" is caused by the use of various statistical methods.

=== Religion ===
Census 2021 (1+ %)
Religion	Number	Fraction
Roman Catholic Church	1676	70.72%
None	537	22.66%
Not found out	62	2.62%
Evangelical Church	35	1.48%
Total	2370	

In year 2021 was 2370 people by religion 1676 from Roman Catholic Church, 537 from None, 62 from Not found out, 35 from Evangelical Church, 14 from Ad hoc movements, 12 from Other, 9 from Christian Congregations in Slovakia, 6 from Greek Catholic Church, 5 from Other and not ascertained christian church, 4 from Paganism and natural spirituality, 2 from Islam, 2 from Church of Jesus Christ of Latter-day Saints, 1 from Jewish community, 1 from Calvinist Church, 1 from Eastern Orthodox Church, 1 from Jehovah's Witnesses, 1 from Hinduism and 1 from Buddhism.

== Genealogical resources ==
The records for genealogical research are available at the state archive "Statny Archiv in Bratislava, Slovakia"

- Roman Catholic church records (births/marriages/deaths): 1669-1895 (parish A)
- Lutheran church records (births/marriages/deaths): 1666-1895 (parish B)
- Reformated church records (births/marriages/deaths): 1666-1895 (parish B)

== Coat of arms ==
The first seal of the village had a ribbon above the shield with the inscription "Belarh". In the late Gothic shield there is the head of a saint on a plate (St. John the Baptist), below it are the unclear letters JOH and next to the shield the letters r and v. Today's coat of arms of the village: in the upper half of the green shield there are gold and silver scales, below them a silver keyhole growing from the tip of the shield on a golden poriz, threaded through a stump with roots. In the larger coat of arms, the bearer of the shield is St. Michael, holding the left golden corner of the shield with his left hand, and a flaming sword in his right.

== Notable people ==
- Stanislav Dusík, painter, graphic artist and illustrator
- Jozef Dusík, graphic artist, younger brother of Stanislav Dusík
- Peter Danišovič, builder, water manager and university teacher
- Karol Kahoun, Slovak art historian, conservationist and university pedagogue
- Jozef Vadovič, Roman Catholic priest
- Viliam Ostatník - Institute of Brothers of Christian Schools. As a professor of English, mathematics, physics and chemistry, he worked in Lebanon, Belgium, Ethiopia, Uganda and other countries. He lives and works in France. He was born on June 21, 1922 in Boleráz.

== Gallery ==
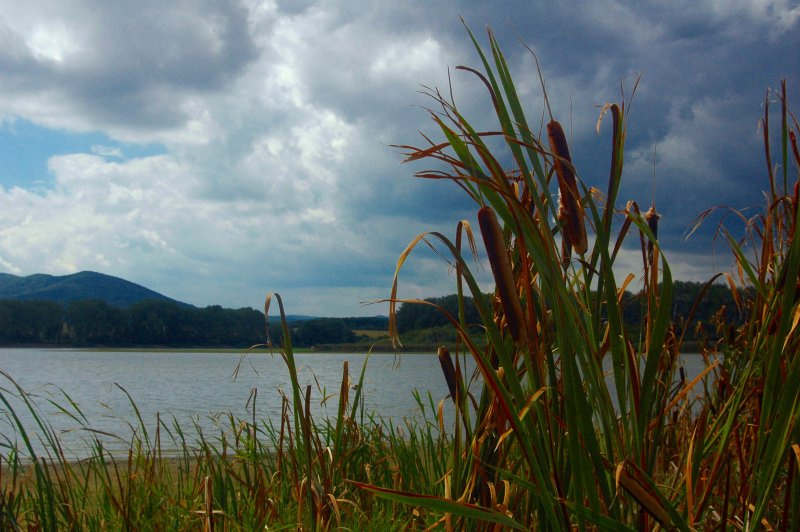
Reservoir by Boleráz.

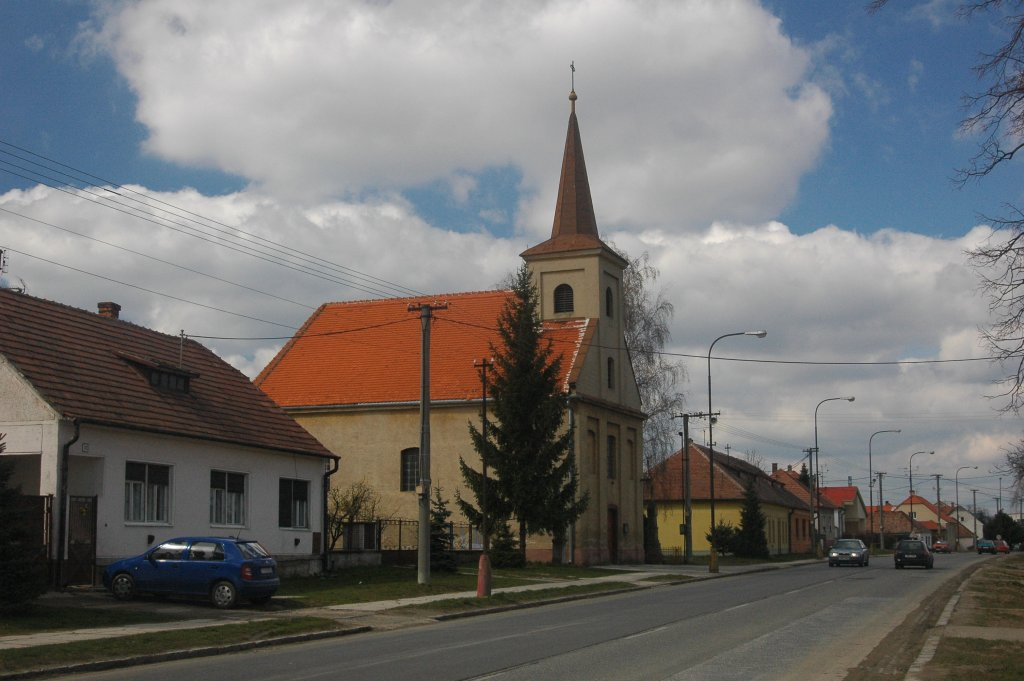
Church in Boleráz.

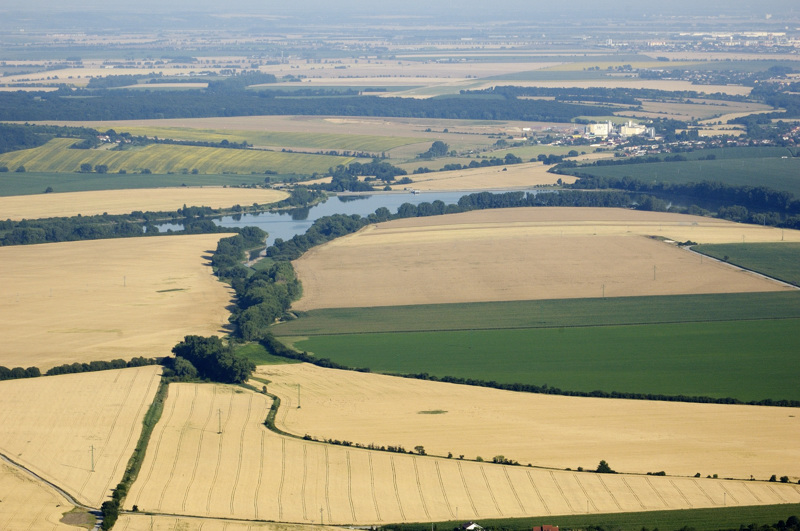
Fields in Boleráz.

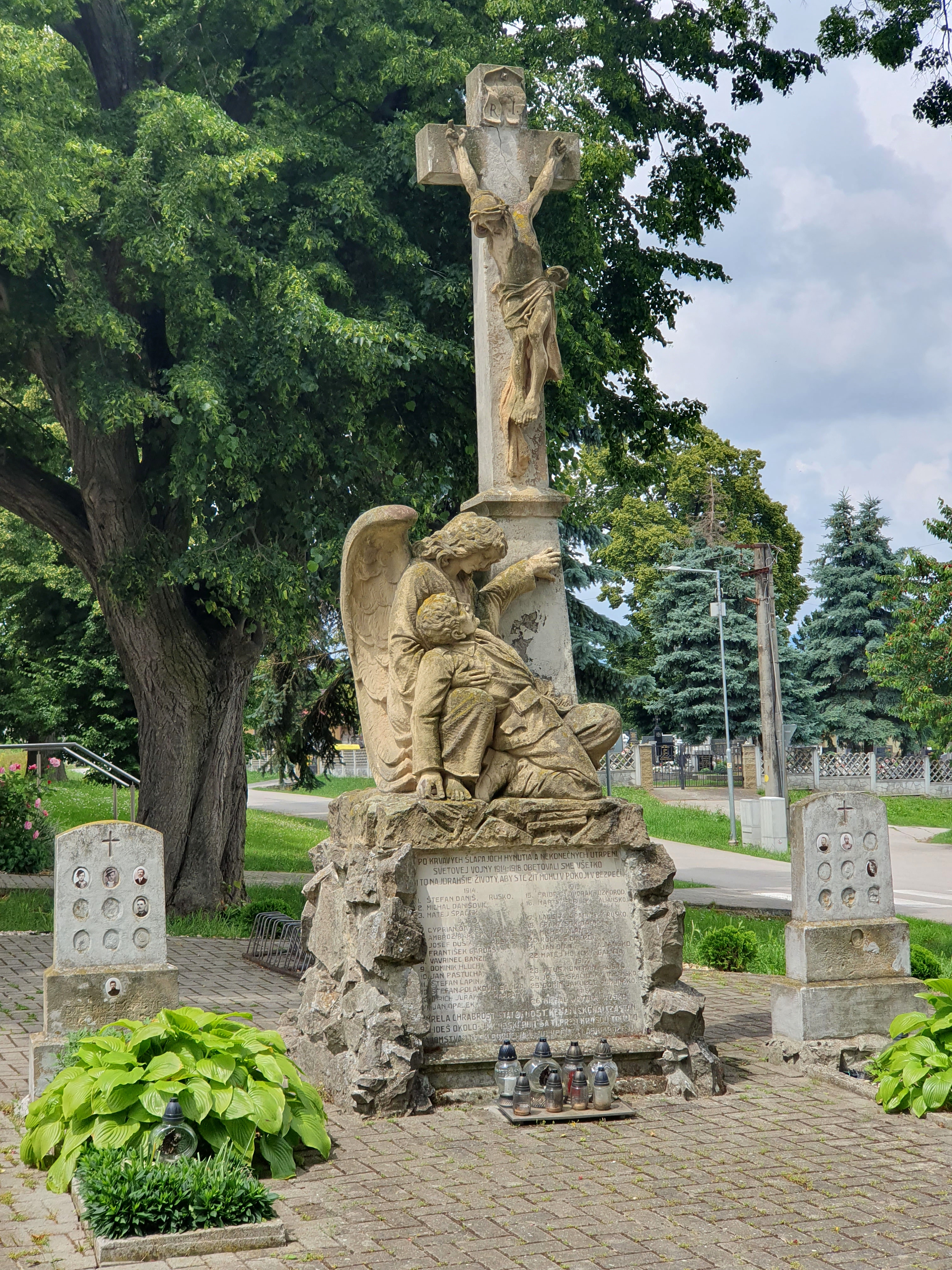
Grave in Boleráz.

== Sports ==
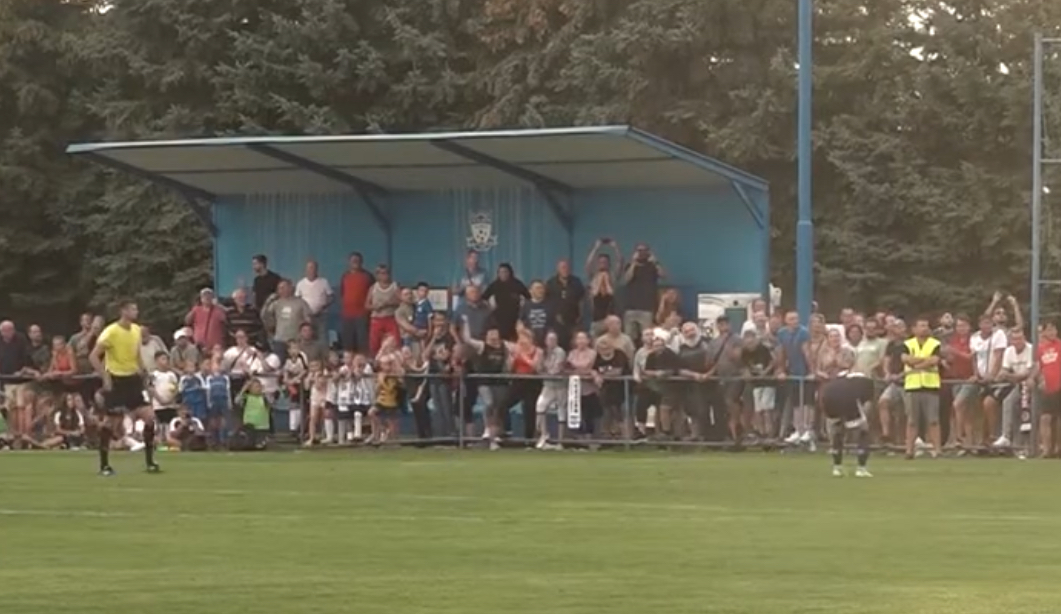
One of the eight stands of the Slavoj Boleraz ground.

Boleráz also have football club called TJ Slavoj Boleráz who currently play in the 4th division of Slovak Football Pyramid.

== See also ==
- List of municipalities and towns in Slovakia
