= 2016–17 Slovak Cup =

Slovnaft cup

Tournament details
- Country: Slovakia
- Teams: 202

Final positions
- Champions: Slovan Bratislava
- Runners-up: MFK Skalica

The 2016–17 Slovak Cup (also known as the 2016–17 Slovnaft Cup for sponsorship reasons) is the 48th edition of the competition. The winners of the competition will qualify for the first qualifying round of the 2017–18 UEFA Europa League.

== Participating teams ==
=== Fortuna Liga (12 Teams) ===
- Trenčín
- Slovan Bratislava
- Ružomberok
- Žilina
- Dunajská Streda
- Zlaté Moravce
- Senica
- Prešov
- Myjava
- Spartak Trnava
- Michalovce
- Podbrezová

=== 2. liga (18 Teams) ===
- FC Nitra
- Šamorín
- Skalica
- Nové Mesto nad Váhom
- Sereď
- Dukla Banská Bystrica
- Martin
- FK Pohronie
- VSS Košice
- Lokomotíva Košice
- Bardejov
- Poprad
- Zvolen
- Liptovský Mikuláš
- Spišská Nová Ves
- Haniska
- Lipany
- Rimavská Sobota

=== 3. liga (43 Teams) ===
- Inter Bratislava
- Rohožník
- Devínska Nová Ves
- Rača
- Malacky
- Lozorno
- Most pri Bratislave
- Dunajská Lužná
- Ivanka pri Dunaji
- Báhoň
- Pezinok
- Púchov
- Komárno
- Topoľčany
- Veľké Ludince
- Beluša
- Šaľa
- Veľký Meder
- Šurany
- Gabčíkovo
- Nemšová
- Šúrovce
- Horná Nitra
- Nové Zámky
- Krásno nad Kysucou
- Čadca
- Teplička nad Váhom
- Stráža
- Liptovská Štiavnica
- Liptovský Hrádok
- Žarnovica
- Makov
- Fiľakovo
- Vyšné Opátske
- Trebišov
- Svit
- Stropkov
- Sabinov
- Svidník
- Vranov nad Topľou
- Plavnica
- Veľký Horeš

=== 4. liga (60 Teams) ===
- Petržalka akadémia
- Limbach
- Šenkvice
- Veľké Leváre
- Závod
- Čunovo
- Borčice
- Častkovce
- Vrbové
- Jaslovské Bohunice
- Boleráz
- Trenčianske Stankovce
- Malženice
- Domaniža
- Šimonovany-Partizánske
- Hlohovec
- Trenčianske Teplice
- Partizánske
- Prečín
- Kolárovo
- Dvory nad Žitavou
- Svätý Peter
- Hrušovany
- Oravské Veselé
- Tvrdošín
- Závažná Poruba
- Rosina
- Turčianska Štiavnička
- Kysucké Nové Mesto
- Bytča
- Diviaky
- Slovenské Ďarmoty
- Vinica
- Šalková
- Veľký Krtíš
- Pliešovce
- Badín
- Medzibrod
- Kováčová
- Tornaľa
- Revúca
- Poltár
- Olováry
- Šarišské Michaľany
- Dlhé Klčovo
- Raslavice
- Ľubotice
- Kračúnovce
- Spišské Podhradie
- Humenné
- Krompachy
- Rožňava
- Čaňa
- Kalša
- Medzev
- Sobrance
- Strážske
- Geča
- Parchovany
- Moldava nad Bodvou

=== 5. liga (69 Teams) ===
source: futbalnet.sk

== First round ==
The matches were played from 23 July to 2 August 2016.

Team 1	Score	Team 2
23 July
TJ Družstevník Perín (5)	0–2	MFK Spartak Medzev (4)
24 July
TJ Slovan Zemianske Kostoľany (5)	w/o	FK Slovan Nemšová (3)
FK Rajec (5)	0–3	TJ Tatran Krásno nad Kysucou (3)
TJ Slovan Skalité (5)	0–1	FK Čadca (3)
TJ Snaha Zborov nad Bystricou (5)	0–4	MŠK Kysucké Nové Mesto (4)
FK Strečno (5)	2–4	OFK Teplička nad Váhom (3)
OŠK Bešeňová (5)	3–1	JUPIE Podlavice Badín (4)
FK Slovan Žabokreky (5)	0–3	TJ Družstevník Liptovská Štiavnica (3)
Oravan Oravská Jasenica (5)	1–1 (1–3 p)	ŠKM Liptovský Hrádok (3)
TJ Tatran Chlebnice (5)	0–2	ŠK Tvrdošín (4)
FC 34 Liptovský Mikuláš - Palúdzka (5)	1–3	MFK Žarnovica (3)
FK Predmier (5)	3–2	ŠK Javorník Makov (3)
1. OFC Liptovské Sliače (5)	0–1	ŠK Turčianska Štiavnička (4)
FK Iskra Hnúšťa (5)	1–0	TJ Sklotatran Poltár (4)
TJ Baník Štiavnické Bane (5)	1–2	FK Šalková (4)
OFK 1950 Priechod (5)	2–1	FK FC Baník Veľký Krtíš (4)
TJ Višňové (5)	5–0	FK Nižná (5)
TJ Družstevník Oravská Poruba (5)	3–0	ŠK Závažná Poruba (4)
TJ Nový život Kluknava (5)	1–3	FK POKROK SEZ Krompachy (4)
MŠK Slavoj Spišská Belá (5)	3–1	FK Veľká Lomnica (5)
FK 1931 Hranovnica (5)	0–4	FK Svit (3)
OŠK Radzovce (5)	1–4	MFK Nová Baňa (3)
OFK Olováry (4)	1–1 (3–4 p)	ŠK Novohrad Lučenec (3)
FK Jesenské (5)	2–2 (3–4 p)	ŠK Vinica (4)
FK CSM Tisovec (5)	3–2	FK Mesta Tornaľa (4)
MFK Stará Turá (5)	2–4	OK Častkovce (4)
ŠK FC Vydrany (5)	4–3	FC Slovan Hlohovec (4)
FC Pata (5)	5–0	TJ Družstevník Zvončín (5)
TJ Lehnice (5)	0–5	FK Malženice (4)
FK 05 Levoča (5)	2–1	ŠK Harichovce (5)
MFK Dobšiná (5)	2–5	MFK Rožňava (4)
FK Kechnec (5)	4–0	ŠKO Veľká Ida (5)
Slávia TU Košice (5)	0–5	FK Geča 73 (4)
FK Čaňa (4)	3–3 (5–4 p)	TJ Mladosť Kalša (4)
TJ Slavoj Kráľovský Chlmec (5)	0–3	Družstevník Veľký Horeš (3)
OFK Tatran Kračúnovce (4)	1–0	TJ Sokol Ľubotice (4)
FC Pivovar Veľký Šariš (5)	1–1 (3–1 p)	OŠFK Šarišské Michaľany (4)
TJ Šľachtiteľ Malý Šariš (5)	1–2	MŠK Spišské Podhradie (4)
TJ Jasenov (5)	3–1	TJ Ptava NV Ptičie (5)
OFK Dlhé Klčovo (4)	1–0	FK Humenné (4)
TJ Družstevník Petrovce nad Laborcom (5)	0–2	MFK Sobrance (4)
FK Terchová (5)	0–3	TJ Tatran Oravské Veselé (4)
TJ Fatran Varín (5)	1–1 (2–4 p)	TJ Stráža (3)
FK Iskra Borčice (4)	1–0	KFC Komárno (3)
TJ Družstevník Malá Ida (5)	6–1	FK Bodva Moldava nad Bodvou (4)
ŠK Selce (5)	3–0	MFK Revúca (4)
TJ Družstevník Parchovany (4)	1–1 (2–4 p)	ŠK Strážske (4)
ATTACK Vrútky (5)	0–1	ŠK Dynamo Diviaky (4)
TJ Máj Ružomberok-Černová (5)	1–0	ŠK Prameň Kováčová (4)
ŠK Belá (5)	2–0	MFK Bytča (4)
27 July
FK Chotín (5)	1–9	FKM Nové Zámky (3)
30 July
NMŠK 1922 Bratislava (5)	0–4	FK Inter Bratislava (3)
FC Komjatice (5)	0–5	Športové Kluby Blava 1928 (4)
OFK Solčany (5)	2–4	FK TEMPO Partizánske (4)
ŠK Veľké Zálužie (5)	0–2	MFK Topvar Topoľčany (3)
ŠK Nevidzany (5)	0–1	OFK Hrušovany (4)
TJ Družstevník Jacovce (5)	3–4	ŠK Slovan Šimonovany - Partizánske (4)
TJ Veľké Leváre (4)	3–0	ŠK Lozorno (3)
FK Karpaty Limbach (4)	0–2	FK Slovan Ivanka pri Dunaji (3)
ŠK Závod (4)	0–4	FC Malacky (3)
ŠK Šenkvice (4)	1–2	PŠC Pezinok (3)
FK ŠK Danubia Hrubý Šúr (5)	1–5	FK Slovan Most pri Bratislave (3)
31 July
FC Petržalka akadémia (4)	3–1	FK Rača (3)
TJ Lovča (5)	0–1	TJ Tatran VLM Pliešovce (4)
FC 98 Hajnáčka (5)	3–4	FK Slovenské Ďarmoty (4)
TJ Plevník - Drienové (5)	2–0	TJ Partizán Prečín (4)
TJ Slovan Brvnište (5)	3–1	TJ Partizán Domaniža (4)
TJ Tatran Horovce (5)	5–1	MŠK Slovan Trenčianske Teplice (4)
TJ Družstevník Veľké Kostoľany (5)	2–2 (3–5 p)	MFK Vrbové (4)
FC Nový Život (5)	7–1	OŠK Svätý Peter (4)
FK TJ Lokomotíva Kozárovce (5)	1–3	TJ Družstevník Dvory nad Žitavou (4)
TJ Družstevník Bešeňov (5)	0–1	FK Kolárovo (4)
TJ Horné Saliby (5)	0–1	TJ Slavoj Boleráz (4)
TJ Čunovo Bratislava (4)	0–1	FK Lokomotíva Devínska Nová Ves (3)
2 August
TJ Tatran Cementáreň Ladce (5)	0–0 (4–1 p)	OŠK Trenčianske Stankovce (4)

== Second round ==
The matches were played from 31 July to 23 August 2016.

Team 1	Score	Team 2
31 July
MŠK Kysucké Nové Mesto (4)	0–5	ŠK Odeva Lipany (2)
9 August
MFK Vranov nad Topľou (3)	0–0 (2–3 p)	ŠK Slovan Bratislava (1)
1.FK Svidník (3)	0–5	FO ŽP Šport Podbrezová (1)
TJ Višňové (5)	2–2 (5–4 p)	MŠK Tesla Stropkov (3)
FK Geča 73 (4)	1–3	Spartak Myjava (1)
FK Slovenské Ďarmoty (4)	4–0	FK Haniska (2)
FK Predmier (5)	0–4	1. FC Tatran Prešov (1)
TJ Tatran Krásno nad Kysucou (3)	0–4	ŠKF Sereď (2)
ŠK Belá (5)	0–3	MŠK - Thermál Veľký Meder (3)
MFK Vrbové (4)	0–2	MFK Zemplín Michalovce (1)
FK Družstevník Plavnica (3)	1–6	MFK Ružomberok (1)
TJ Slovan Zemianske Kostoľany (5)	0–2	MŠK Púchov (3)
10 August
FK POKROK SEZ Krompachy (4)	2–5	TJ Družstevník Liptovská Štiavnica (3)
MŠK Spišské Podhradie (4)	1–3	ŠK Tvrdošín (4)
OŠK Bešeňová (5)	0–0 (3–4 p)	TJ Tatran Oravské Veselé (4)
TJ Sokol Medzibrod (4)	1–4	FC Lokomotíva Košice (2)
OFK Tatran Kračúnovce (4)	1–4	FK Spišská Nová Ves (2)
OFK - SIM Raslavice (4)	2–2 (5–3 p)	Družstevník Veľký Horeš (3)
FK Čaňa (4)	0–0 (3–5 p)	FC ViOn Zlaté Moravce - Vráble (1)
OFK 1950 Priechod (5)	0–6	OFK Teplička nad Váhom (3)
TJ Jasenov (5)	3–2	MFK Spartak Medzev (4)
ŠK Vinica (4)	2–0	ŠK Turčianska Štiavnička (4)
TJ Družstevník Malá Ida (5)	0–2	MFK Sobrance (4)
MFK Žarnovica (3)	1–2	ŠKM Liptovský Hrádok (3)
FK Svit (3)	0–2	FK Poprad (2)
FTC Fiľakovo (3)	0–2	TJ FK Vyšné Opátske (3)
FK Iskra Hnúšťa (5)	2–2 (0–3 p)	MŠK Slavoj Spišská Belá (5)
OFK Dlhé Klčovo (4)	0–5	MFK Tatran Liptovský Mikuláš (2)
MFK Slovan Sabinov (3)	0–1	MFK Lokomotíva Zvolen (2)
FC Pivovar Veľký Šariš (5)	5–0	FK Kechnec (5)
ŠK Báhoň (3)	1–1 (4–5 p)	FK Dukla Banská Bystrica (2)
FKM Nové Zámky (3)	0–1	TJ Družstevník Veľké Ludince (3)
TJ Tatran Horovce (5)	1–8	AFC Nové Mesto nad Váhom (2)
TJ Tatran VLM Pliešovce (4)	0–3	FK Slovan Ivanka pri Dunaji (3)
FK Šalková (4)	2–0	OFK Dunajská Lužná (3)
MFK Topvar Topoľčany (3)	1–3	FC Nitra (2)
FK Malženice (4)	2–0	TJ Družstevník Dvory nad Žitavou (4)
TJ Tatran Cementáreň Ladce (5)	1–2	MFK Nová Baňa (3)
Športové Kluby Blava 1928 (4)	2–3	FK Pohronie (2)
FC Nový Život (5)	9–1	FC Malacky (3)
OK Častkovce (4)	1–2	TJ Slavoj Boleráz (4)
TJ Stráža (3)	1–3	FC Spartak Trnava (1)
FK Iskra Borčice (4)	7–1	PŠC Pezinok (3)
ŠK Slovan Šimonovany - Partizánske (4)	1–1 (4–3 p)	ŠK Šurany (3)
ŠK FC Vydrany (5)	1–3	FK Inter Bratislava (3)
FC Pata (5)	3–0	FK Slovan Most pri Bratislave (3)
FC Horses Šúrovce (3)	1–3	ŠK Svätý Jur (2)
FK Kolárovo (4)	2–2 (2–4 p)	FK Slovan Duslo Šaľa (3)
ŠK Dynamo Diviaky (4)	0–3	FC VSS Košice (2)
MFK Rožňava (4)	1–3	MŠK Žilina (1)
ŠK Selce (5)	1–4	Partizán Bardejov (2)
OFK Hrušovany (4)	0–1	FC Rohožník (3)
TJ Plevník - Drienové (5)	0–9	AS Trenčín (1)
TJ Slovan Brvnište (5)	1–1 (6–5 p)	FC Baník Horná Nitra (3)
FK CSM Tisovec (5)	5–1	TJ Máj Ružomberok-Černová (5)
TJ Družstevník Oravská Poruba (5)	2–0	ŠK Novohrad Lučenec (3)
FK Lokomotíva Devínska Nová Ves (3)	1–4	FC ŠTK 1914 Šamorín (2)
FC Petržalka akadémia (4)	1–5	MFK Skalica (2)
16 August
OŠK Rosina (4)	0–5	FK Senica (1)
TJ KOVO Beluša (3)	0–1	FC DAC 1904 Dunajská Streda (1)
17 August
FK TEMPO Partizánske (4)	0–2	MŠK Fomat Martin (2)
TJ Veľké Leváre (4)	2–7	ŠK 1923 Gabčíkovo (3)
FK 05 Levoča (5)	2–2 (4–3 p)	ŠK Strážske (4)
23 August
FK Čadca (3)	1–2	FK Slavoj Trebišov (3)

== Third round ==
The matches were played from 24 August to 21 September 2016.

Team 1	Score	Team 2
24 August
ŠK Slovan Šimonovany - Partizánske (4)	1–1 (5–4 p)	FK Inter Bratislava (3)
31 August
FC Pata (5)	0–6	MFK Zemplín Michalovce (1)
7 September
FC Nový Život (5)	3–0	TJ Slavoj Boleráz (4)
13 September
TJ Tatran Oravské Veselé (4)	1–6	ŠK Slovan Bratislava (1)
Partizán Bardejov (2)	0–0 (3–4 p)	MFK Ružomberok (1)
14 September
ŠK Svätý Jur (2)	1–6	FC DAC 1904 Dunajská Streda (1)
FK Pohronie (2)	1–3	ŠKF Sereď (2)
TJ Slovan Brvnište (5)	1–1 (4–2 p)	FC Rohožník (3)
FK Malženice (4)	2–0	MFK Nová Baňa (3)
FK Dukla Banská Bystrica (2)	0–1	1. FC Tatran Prešov (1)
FC ŠTK 1914 Šamorín (2)	0–2	MFK Skalica (2)
FK Iskra Borčice (4)	0–1	FC Spartak Trnava (1)
FK Slovan Ivanka pri Dunaji (3)	3–4	AFC Nové Mesto nad Váhom (2)
TJ FK Vyšné Opátske (3)	1–5	FK Poprad (2)
MFK Sobrance (4)	1–5	ŠKM Liptovský Hrádok (3)
TJ Višňové (5)	3–2	ŠK Vinica (4)
TJ Jasenov (5)	0–2	FO ŽP Šport Podbrezová (1)
FK Slovenské Ďarmoty (4)	2–0	FK Slavoj Trebišov (3)
FC Pivovar Veľký Šariš (5)	0–6	Spartak Myjava (1)
MFK Tatran Liptovský Mikuláš (2)	1–0	MFK Lokomotíva Zvolen (2)
MŠK Slavoj Spišská Belá (5)	1–1 (3–4 p)	ŠK Odeva Lipany (2)
FK CSM Tisovec (5)	2–1	ŠK Tvrdošín (4)
FK 05 Levoča (5)	1–1 (1–3 p)	TJ Družstevník Liptovská Štiavnica (3)
OFK Teplička nad Váhom (3)	1–4	FC ViOn Zlaté Moravce - Vráble (1)
OFK - SIM Raslavice (4)	2–7	FK Spišská Nová Ves (2)
TJ Družstevník Oravská Poruba (5)	0–4	FC Lokomotíva Košice (2)
MŠK Žilina (1)	3–0	FC VSS Košice (2)
FK Šalková (4)	0–1	FC Nitra (2)
21 September
ŠK 1923 Gabčíkovo (3)	1–2	FK Slovan Duslo Šaľa (3)
MŠK Púchov (3)	0–3	AS Trenčín (1)
MŠK - Thermál Veľký Meder (3)	0–0 (3–1 p)	MŠK Fomat Martin (2)
TJ Družstevník Veľké Ludince (3)	1–1 (5–3 p)	FK Senica (1)

== Fourth round ==
The matches were played from 27 September to 5 October 2016.

Team 1	Score	Team 2
27 September
ŠK Odeva Lipany (2)	1–2	MŠK Žilina (1)
MFK Skalica (2)	0–0 (12–11 p)	FO ŽP Šport Podbrezová (1)
FC Nový Život (5)	0–3	MFK Zemplín Michalovce (1)
28 September
TJ Višňové (5)	1–4	MFK Tatran Liptovský Mikuláš (2)
FK Slovenské Ďarmoty (4)	0–3	ŠK Slovan Bratislava (1)
ŠKF Sereď (2)	3–1	FC ViOn Zlaté Moravce - Vráble (1)
FK Malženice (4)	0–1	1. FC Tatran Prešov (1)
MŠK - Thermál Veľký Meder (3)	0–1	AS Trenčín (1)
FK CSM Tisovec (5)	0–4	FK Poprad (2)
TJ Družstevník Liptovská Štiavnica (3)	0–5	FC DAC 1904 Dunajská Streda (1)
AFC Nové Mesto nad Váhom (2)	0–3	FC Spartak Trnava (1)
ŠK Slovan Šimonovany - Partizánske (4)	1–7	MFK Ružomberok (1)
5 October
TJ Slovan Brvnište (5)	1–10	FC Nitra (2)
ŠKM Liptovský Hrádok (3)	1–1 (4–2 p)	FC Lokomotíva Košice (2)
FK Slovan Duslo Šaľa (3)	2–5	Spartak Myjava (1)
TJ Družstevník Veľké Ludince (3)	2–1	FK Spišská Nová Ves (2)

== Fifth round ==
The matches were played from 18 October to 30 November 2016.

Team 1	Score	Team 2
18 October
1. FC Tatran Prešov (1)	0–3	FK Poprad (2)
MFK Ružomberok (1)	0–0 (3–5 p)	AS Trenčín (1)
19 October
MFK Tatran Liptovský Mikuláš (2)	1–1 (2–4 p)	ŠKM Liptovský Hrádok (3)
TJ Družstevník Veľké Ludince (3)	0–1	ŠK Slovan Bratislava (1)
ŠKF Sereď (2)	1–1 (3–5 p)	MŠK Žilina (1)
MFK Skalica (2)	1–0	Spartak Myjava (1)
22 November
MFK Zemplín Michalovce (1)	3–2	FC Nitra (2)
30 November
FC DAC 1904 Dunajská Streda (1)	1–0	FC Spartak Trnava (1)

== Quarter-finals ==
The matches were played on 7 and 8 March 2017.

7 March 2017	DAC 1904 Dunajská Streda (1)	0–1	FK Poprad (2)	Dunajská Streda
18:00		Report	Šesták 4'	Stadium: DAC Aréna; Attendance: 3,231; Referee: Ivan Kružilak

8 March 2017	MFK Skalica (2)	3−2	MŠK Žilina (1)	Skalica
14:30	Človečko 2'; Ulrich 16'; Šebesta 79'	Report	Mráz 22', 90+3'	Stadium: Mestský štadión Attendance: 1,520; Referee: Boris Marhefka

8 March 2017	ŠKM Liptovský Hrádok (3)	0−3	Zemplín Michalovce (1)	Liptovský Hrádok
15:00		Report	Dimitriadis 35'; Kushta 48'; Žofčák 89'	Stadium: Stadium pri Belej; Attendance: 1,230; Referee: Michal Smolák

8 March 2017	Slovan Bratislava (1)	3−1	AS Trenčín (1)	Bratislava
18:00	Priskin 12'; Čavrić 59'; Savićević 69'	Report	Janga 65'	Stadium: Štadión Pasienky; Attendance: 925; Referee: Mario Vlk

== Semi-finals ==
The matches were played from 4 to 12 April 2017.

=== First leg ===
4 April 2017	Zemplín Michalovce (1)	1–2	Slovan Bratislava (1)	Michalovce
17:00	Dimitriadis 41'	Report	Priskin 5'; Soumah 55'	Stadium: Mestský futbalový štadión Attendance: 1,895; Referee: Filip Glova

5 April 2017	FK Poprad (2)	1–0	MFK Skalica (2)	Poprad
17:00	Šesták 56'	Report		Stadium: NTC Poprad; Attendance: 2,250; Referee: Jan Valášek

=== Second leg ===
11 April 2017	Slovan Bratislava (1)	1–0 (3–1 agg.)	Zemplín Michalovce (1)	Bratislava
18:30	Priskin 9'	Report		Stadium: Štadión Pasienky; Attendance: 512; Referee: Michal Očenáš

12 April 2017	MFK Skalica (2)	2–0 (2–1 agg.)	FK Poprad (2)	Skalica
17:00	Hruška 8'; Meszáros 69'	Report		Stadium: Mestský štadión Referee: Jozef Pavlík

== Final ==
1 May 2017
16:20 CEST (UTC+2)

MFK Skalica (2)	0–3	Slovan Bratislava (1)
	Report	Rundić 20'; Čavrić 62'; Soumah 76' (pen.)

NTC Poprad, Poprad
Attendance: 2,432
Referee: Pavol Chmura
