= 2018–19 Slovak Cup =

Tournament details
- Country: Slovakia
- Teams: 236

Final positions
- Champions: Spartak Trnava
- Runners-up: Žilina

The 2018–19 Slovak Cup was the 50th edition of the competition. This tournament began on 15 July 2018.

Slovan Bratislava were the defending champions, having won the previous season's Cup by defeating Ružomberok in the final by a score of 3–1.

== Format ==
The Cup this season was a knockout tournament contested between 236 clubs. Matches which were level after regulation advanced to penalties to determine a winner. Each round of the cup was contested over one leg with the exception of the semi-finals which were contested over two legs.

== Preliminary round ==
Team 1	Score	Team 2
Kurima	1–5	Tesla Stropkov
Dubinné	0–0 (1–3 p)	Raslavice
Dúbravka Bratislava	2–1	Vrakuňa
Studienka	1–1 (4–2 p)	Lozorno
Doľany	4–2	Pezinok–Cajla
Šenkvice	1–10	Vajnory
Veľké Leváre	0–7	Malacky

== First round ==
Team 1	Score	Team 2
Cabaj-Čápor	0–4	Pata
Tatran Oščadnica	0–5	Námestovo
Slavoj Spišská Belá	1–3	Šarišské Michaľany
Družstevník Borov	0–2	Snina
Levoča	1–3	Spišské Podhradie
Jesenské	3–1	Novohrad Lučenec
Oravan	3–3 (5–6 p)	Liptovská Štiavnica
Ptava NV Ptičie	1–0	Slovan Giraltovce
Tatran Turzovka	3–0	Terchová
Spišská Stará Ves	0–2	Stará Ľubovňa
Vinica	5–0	Detva
Banská Štiavnica	3–2	Badín
Bernolákovo	1–1 (3–4 p)	Devinska Nová Ves
Bešeňová	2–1	Fomat Martin
Čierna nad Tisou	2–6	Pavlovce nad Uhom
Družstevník Čečejovce	1–6	Krásnohorské Podhradie
Družstevník Budimir	1–2	Mladosť Kalša
Fatran Varín	1–3	Tatran Krásno
Bacúch	2–0	Hriňová
Hajnáčka	0–1	Fiľakovo
Harichovce	0–1	Start Hrabušice
Hornád Ždaňa	3–7	Geča
Iskra Hnúšťa	1–2	Kováčová
Jasenov	1–4	Vranov nad Topľou
Kežmarok	1–4	Gerlachov
Košická Nová Ves	1–1 (3–4 p)	Čaňa
Kotesova	2–3	Rosina
Kráľovský Chlmec	5–1	Streda nad Bodrogom
Krisovska Lieskova	0–3	Veľké Kapušany
Ladomerská Vieska	0–3	Šalková
Lovča	0–5	Sokol Medzibrod
Magura Vavrecka	1–3	Kysucké Nové Mesto
Strojár Krupina	0–1	Príbelce
Nižná	1–2	Čadca
Olcnava	5–1	Tatran Ľubica
OSK Lieskovec	0–1	Tisovec
Slovan Poproč	1–4	Slávia TU Košice
Predmier	1–2	Javorník Makov
Radzovce	1–3	Poltár
Raslavice	0–3	Tesla Stropkov
Sacurov	2–0	Tatran Kračúnovce
Čierne	4–1	Dolný Kubín
Selce	0–2	Lokomotíva Zvolen
Veľká Ida	0–4	Spartak Medzev
Spartak Brekov	0–2	Strážske
Spartak Vysoka	2–2 (5–4 p)	Jednota Bánová
Švošov	1–1 (7–6 p)	Slovan Žabokreky
Tahanovce	0–3	Kechnec
Tepličan	5–1	Dynamo Diviaky
Družstevník Parchovany	0–1	Sobrance
Slovan Skalité	0–1	Oravské Veselé
Tvarona Ulič	0–1	Humenné
Višňové	1–2	Stráňavy
Veľká Lomnica	5–2	Hranovnica
Veľký Krtíš	1–2	Pliesovce
Vinohrad Čebovce	0–1	Ďarmoty
Družstevník Odorín	0–9	FC Košice
Kalinkovo	0–3	Dunajská Lužná
Kostolné Kračany	2–3	Vydrany
Častkovce	0–3	Nové Mesto nad Váhom
Activ Velke Kosihy	1–3	Kolárovo
Slovan Šahy	1–3	Kalná nad Hronom
Oponice	2–3	Solčany
Podlužany	1–0	Veľké Ludince
Partizán Cígeľ	2–2 (5–6 p)	Baník Prievidza
Doľany	2–5	Báhoň
Dúbravka Bratislava	0–7	Rača
MFK Aleksince	1–4	Slovan Hlohovec
Male Dvorniky	3–1	Trstice
Bešeňová	2–0	Veľké Lovce
Dolné Vestenice	3–3 (5–4 p)	Lehota
Družstevník Ivanka	0–4	Slovan Galanta
Družstevník Radimov	0–0 (4–2 p)	Spartak Myjava
Dvory nad Žitavou	w/o	Nové Zámky
Horna Krupa	1–2	Vrbové
Horné Orešany	2–1	Boleráz
Družstevník Jacovce	1–2	Slovan Krušovce
Kovarce	0–6	Hrušovany
Malacky	0–0 (0–2 p)	Pezinok–Cajla
Manin Podmanin	1–1 (3–0 p)	Partizán Domaniža
Nevidzany	1–3	Lokomotíva Kozarovce
Plevník-Drienové	w/o	Nemšová
Rusovce	4–2	Rovinka
SC Čenkovce	0–2	Nový Život
Šurany	3–2	Imeľ
Slovan Brvnište	0–2	KOVO Beluša
Slovan Ivanka pri Dunaji	5–1	Tomášov
Špačince	1–1 (7–8 p)	Jaslovské Bohunice
Studienka	2–3	Rohožník
Tatran Ladce	w/o	Považská Bystrica
Partizán Prečín	0–1	Púchov
Salka	0–0 (6–5 p)	Štúrovo
Slovan Zemianske Kostoľany	0–0 (6–7 p)	Slovan Šimonovany
Tvrdošín	1–0	Olympia Bobrov
Váhovce	0–5	Veľké Zálužie
Vajnory	2–2 (4–5 p)	Slovan Most
Veľký Kýr	1–0	Kmeťovo
Voderady	0–6	Malženice
Belá Dulice	2–1	Teplička nad Váhom
Tatran Chlebnice	3–1	Závažná Poruba
Ožďany	3–7	Čierny Balog

== Second round ==
Sixty-four matches in the second round were played from 7 August 2018 to 6 September 2018.

Team 1	Score	Team 2
Fiľakovo	3–0	Banská Bystrica
Sobrance	0–5	Partizán Bardejov
Tesla Stropkov	1–3	Ružomberok
Vinica	0–6	ViOn Zlate Moravcé
Pezinok–Cajla	1–5	Skalica
Tatran Turzovka	1–3	Oravské Veselé
Banik Stráňavy	1–4	Lokomotíva Košice
Banská Štiavnica	0–3	Lokomotíva Zvolen
Bešeňov	2–10	Dubnica
Bešeňová	0–6	Zemplín Michalovce
Blava Jaslovské Bohunice	1–1 (3–4 p)	Vrbové
Tatran Chlebnice	1–0	Tepličan
Dolné Vestenice	0–5	Senica
Druzstevnik Radimov	1–1 (2–3 p)	Nové Mesto nad Váhom
Bacúch	2–0	Príbelce
Čaňa	0–5	Podbrezová
Jesenské	0–5	Liptovský Mikuláš
Krásnohorské Podhradie	2–3	Mladosť Kalša
Lokomotíva Kozarovce	0–1	Kalná nad Hronom
Gerlachov	1–1 (4–2 p)	Šarišské Michaľany
Kysucké Nové Mesto	3–2	Poltár
Kechnec	3–2	Geča
Kráľovský Chlmec	0–9	Odeva Lipany
Liptovská Štiavnica	3–1	Čadca
Stará Ľubovňa	0–7	Poprad
Male Dvorniky	1–3	Vydrany
Manin Podmanin	0–2	KOVO Beluša
Spartak Medzev	2–3	Slavoj Trebišov
Sokol Medzibrod	2–0	Čierny Balog
Olcnava	0–8	Spišské Podhradie
Pavlovce nad Uhom	5–2	Veľké Kapušany
Plevník-Drienové	0–4	Považská Bystrica
Pliesovce	2–5	Kováčová
Púchov	2–5	DAC Dunajská Streda
Rosina	0–6	Tatran Prešov
Rusovce	4–0	Slovan Ivanka pri Dunaji
Sačurov	2–1	Ptava NV Ptičie
Belá Dulice	1–3	Tatran Krásno
Čierne	2–1	Javorník Makov
Šurany	1–1 (3–5 p)	Nitra
Veľké Zálužie	0–8	Šamorín
Slávia TU Košice	0–3	FC Košice
Slovan Hlohovec	4–1	Baník Prievidza
Ďarmoty	0–7	Žilina
Snina	2–2 (3–4 p)	Vranov nad Topľou
Spartak Vysoka	0–2	Námestovo
Start Hrabušice	4–0	Veľká Lomnica
Strážske	1–1 (2–4 p)	Humenné
Tisovec	0–4	Komárno
Salka	2–3	Kolárovo
Tvrdošín	0–6	Pohronie
Devinska Nová Ves	0–2	Dunajská Lužná
Nový Život	2–4	Rohožník
Malženice	3–1	Petržalka
Solčany	0–4	Sereď
Slovan Šimonovany	3–2	Hrušovany
Slovan Krušovce	0–3	Pata
Slovan Most	3–1	Báhoň
Veľký Kýr	1–5	Slovan Galanta
Šalková	0–5	Inter Bratislava
Podlužany	0–4	Dvory nad Žitavou
Horné Orešany	3–0 (Note: The match originally ended with a 0–2 win for Slovan Bratislava, but the match was awarded to Horné Orešany because Slovan Bratislava fielded an ineligible player named Marin Ljubičić.)	Slovan Bratislava
Švošov	3–6	AS Trenčín
Rača	0–9	Spartak Trnava

== Third round ==
Thirty-two matches in the third round were played from 29 August 2018 to 26 September 2018.

Team 1	Score	Team 2
Pata	0–2	Považská Bystrica
Kováčová	2–5	Liptovský Mikuláš
Oravské Veselé	0–0 (3–4 p)	Tatran Prešov
Sačurov	1–3	Partizán Bardejov
Nové Mesto nad Váhom	0–0 (2–4 p)	Malženice
Čierne	0–1	Lokomotíva Košice
Dunajská Lužná	0–2	Šamorín
Dvory nad Žitavou	0–7	Nitra
Bacúch	1–1 (7–6 p)	Komárno
Humenné	1–4	Vranov nad Topľou
Slovan Galanta	0–2	Sereď
Gerlachov	2–6	Ružomberok
Slovan Hlohovec	1–2	Senica
Horné Orešany	5–3	Vrbové
Start Hrabušice	2–2 (6–7 p)	FC Košice
Kysucké Nové Mesto	0–3	ViOn Zlate Moravcé
Kechnec	0–2	Podbrezová
Kolárovo	0–4	Dubnica
Sokol Medzibrod	0–3	Fiľakovo
Mladosť Kalša	1–1 (5–4 p)	Slavoj Trebišov
Námestovo	0–0 (4–5 p)	Zemplín Michalovce
Pavlovce nad Uhom	1–1 (4–5 p)	Odeva Lipany
Slovan Šimonovany	2–0	Rohožník
Spišské Podhradie	0–3	Poprad
Vydrany	4–0	Kalná nad Hronom
Lokomotíva Zvolen	1–1 (7–6 p)	Inter Bratislava
Liptovská Štiavnica	0–6	AS Trenčín
Tatran Krásno	0–6	Žilina
Tatran Chlebnice	0–2	Pohronie
Rusovce	1–2	Skalica
KOVO Beluša	1–4	DAC Dunajská Streda
Slovan Most	1–3	Spartak Trnava

== Fourth round ==
Sixteen matches in the fourth round were played from 2 October 2018 to 23 October 2018.

Team 1	Score	Team 2
Vranov nad Topľou	2–5	DAC Dunajská Streda
FC Košice	1–0	Dubnica
Považská Bystrica	0–1	Šamorín
Skalica	4–1	Ružomberok
Tatran Prešov	1–2	Žilina
Vydrany	0–3	Nitra
Mladosť Kalša	1–3	Poprad
Bacúch	1–3	Odeva Lipany
Fiľakovo	2–4	Liptovský Mikuláš
Lokomotíva Zvolen	1–2	ViOn Zlate Moravcé
Malženice	1–2	Podbrezová
Lokomotíva Košice	1–5	AS Trenčín
Horné Orešany	0–11	Senica
Slovan Šimonovany	0–4	Zemplín Michalovce
Partizán Bardejov	0–5	Spartak Trnava
Pohronie	2–3	Sereď

== Round of 16 ==
Eight matches in the sixth round were played from 23 October 2018 to 16 November 2018.

Team 1	Score	Team 2
Šamorín	1–1 (8–9 p)	Poprad
Nitra	2–2 (3–1 p)	Liptovský Mikuláš
Zemplín Michalovce	4–2	Odeva Lipany
Senica	5–1	DAC Dunajská Streda
FC Košice	3–1	ViOn Zlate Moravcé
Skalica	2–1	AS Trenčín
Podbrezová	0–2	Spartak Trnava
Sereď	1–3	Žilina

== Quarter-finals ==
Four matches in the quarter-finals were played on 12–13 March 2019.

12 March 2019	Žilina	4–1	Skalica	Žilina
17:00 CET (UTC+01:00)	Káčer 12'; Mihalík 35' (pen.), 79'; Balaj 87'	Report	Opiela 59'	Stadium: Štadión pod Dubňom; Attendance: 1,144; Referee: Ladislav Prešinský

12 March 2019	Senica	5–1	Nitra	Senica
19:00 CET (UTC+01:00)	Ramirez 14', 35', 42', 45'; Petshi 90'	Report	Gatarić 19'	Stadium: OMS Arena; Attendance: 638; Referee: Pavol Chmura

13 March 2019	FC Košice	0–0 (3–4 p)	Spartak Trnava	Košice
15:00 CET (UTC+01:00)		Report		Stadium: Štadión Lokomotívy; Attendance: 4,230; Referee: Michal Smolák
	Penalties
	Dobias (penalty scored); Rizie (penalty scored); Vyshnevskyi (penalty missed); Karaš (penalty missed); Pavúk (penalty scored); Kis (penalty missed)		(penalty scored) Janečka; (penalty scored) Pekár; (penalty missed) Yilmaz; (penalty missed) Sloboda; (penalty scored) Grendel; (penalty scored) Miesenböck

13 March 2019	Zemplín Michalovce	2–1	Poprad	Michalovce
17:00 CET (UTC+01:00)	Kolesár 33'; Danko 37'	Report	L. Horváth 11'	Stadium: Mestský futbalový štadión Attendance: 761; Referee: Kamil Horváth

== Semi-finals ==
For the semi-finals, the first legs were played on 2 and 3 April and the second legs on 16 and 17 April 2019.

=== First leg ===
2 April 2019	Žilina	1–1	Zemplín Michalovce	Žilina
17:00 CEST (UTC+02:00)	Mihalík 68'	Report	Grič 38'	Stadium: Štadión pod Dubňom; Attendance: 1,492; Referee: Michal Smolak

3 April 2019	Spartak Trnava	1–0	Senica	Trnava
18:00 CEST (UTC+02:00)	Markoski 3'	Report		Stadium: Anton Malatinský Stadium; Attendance: 2,744; Referee: Filip Glova

=== Second leg ===
17 April 2019	Zemplín Michalovce	0–2 (1–3 agg.)	Žilina	Michalovce
17:00 CEST (UTC+02:00)		Report	Boženík 48'; Sluka 65'	Stadium: Mestský futbalový štadión Attendance: 2,512; Referee: Michal Smolak

16 April 2019	Senica	0–0 (0–1 agg.)	Spartak Trnava	Senica
19:00 CEST (UTC+02:00)		Report		Stadium: OMS Arena; Attendance: 1,436; Referee: Pavol Chmura

== Final ==
1 May 2019
18:00 (UTC+2)

Spartak Trnava	3–3 (a.e.t.)	Žilina
Miesenböck 20'; Markoski 45+4', 48'	Report	Balaj 50', 71'; Boženík 68'
Penalties
Košút (penalty scored); Depetris (penalty scored); Lovat (penalty scored); Abena (penalty scored)	4–1	(penalty scored) Holúbek; (penalty missed) Káčer; (penalty missed) Boženík

Štadión pod Zoborom, Nitra
Attendance: 6,053
Referee: Jozef Pavlík

== See also ==
- 2018–19 Slovak First Football League
