= 2010–11 Slovak Third League =

3. liga
- Season: 2010–11

The 2010–11 season of Slovak Third League (also known as 3. liga), was the eighteenth season of the fourth-tier football league in Slovakia, since its establishment in 1993.

62 teams were geographically divided into four groups: 3. liga Bratislava (14 teams), 3. liga Západ, 3. liga Stred and 3. liga Východ (16 teams each). Teams were played against teams in their own division only.

From the next season was this league renamed to Majstrovstvá regiónu.

== 3. liga Bratislava ==
=== League table ===
Pos	Team	Pld	W	D	L	GF	GA	GD	Pts	Promotion or relegation
1	Dunajská Lužná (P)	26	18	1	7	61	20	+41	55	Promotion to 3. liga
2	Svätý Jur	26	14	7	5	38	22	+16	49	
3	Plavecký Štvrtok	26	14	4	8	54	33	+21	46	
4	Rovinka	26	11	7	8	45	37	+8	40	
5	Jablonec	26	10	7	9	29	28	+1	37	
6	Stupava	26	9	9	8	37	27	+10	36	
7	Kráľová pri Senci	26	10	5	11	38	33	+5	35	
8	Lozorno	26	9	8	9	34	39	−5	35	
9	Slovenský Grob	26	7	10	9	25	38	−13	31	
10	Dúbravka	26	6	10	10	34	41	−7	28	
11	Iskra Petržalka	26	6	10	10	35	49	−14	28	
12	Ivanka pri Dunaji	26	6	9	11	25	44	−19	27	
13	Ružinov	26	7	5	14	27	53	−26	26	Relegation to 4. liga
14	Čunovo	26	5	8	13	20	38	−18	23	Relegation to 4. liga

Rules for classification: 1) points; 2) goal difference; 3) number of goals scored.
(P) Promoted

== 3. liga Západ ==
=== League table ===
Pos	Team	Pld	W	D	L	GF	GA	GD	Pts	Promotion or relegation
1	Sereď (P)	30	24	3	3	71	27	+44	75	Promotion to 3. liga
2	Považská Bystrica	30	18	5	7	50	21	+29	59	
3	Bánovce nad Bebravou	30	14	6	10	43	33	+10	48	
4	Palárikovo	30	12	10	8	49	35	+14	46	
5	Galanta	30	11	10	9	40	26	+14	43	
6	Veľké Ludince	30	12	6	12	45	27	+18	42	
7	Ludanice	30	11	8	11	48	41	+7	41	
8	Topolníky	30	12	5	13	47	50	−3	41	
9	Dunajská Streda	30	12	5	13	36	46	−10	41	
10	Domaniža	30	11	7	12	39	44	−5	40	
11	Gabčíkovo	30	12	4	14	34	44	−10	40	
12	Skalica	30	11	6	13	40	47	−7	39	
13	Piešťany	30	10	7	13	30	47	−17	37	
14	Dubnica	30	11	2	17	41	50	−9	35	
15	Čierny Brod	30	9	4	17	28	55	−27	31	Relegation to 4. liga
16	Nitra	30	3	6	21	19	67	−48	15	Relegation to 4. liga

Rules for classification: 1) points; 2) goal difference; 3) number of goals scored.
(P) Promoted

== 3. liga Stred ==
=== League table ===
Pos	Team	Pld	W	D	L	GF	GA	GD	Pts	Promotion or relegation
1	Banská Bystrica	30	23	4	3	60	17	+43	73	Promotion to 3. liga
2	Kremnička	30	21	4	5	78	24	+54	67	
3	Námestovo	30	18	5	7	58	32	+26	59	
4	Liptovská Štiavnica	30	14	9	7	53	38	+15	51	
5	Závažná Poruba	30	12	6	12	39	37	+2	42	
6	Nová Baňa	30	13	2	15	39	46	−7	41	
7	Čadca	30	11	7	12	51	44	+7	40	
8	Tisovec	30	10	8	12	32	48	−16	38	
9	Lietavská Lúčka	30	11	4	15	33	46	−13	37	
10	Krásno nad Kysucou	30	11	4	15	32	50	−18	37	
11	Kalinovo	30	10	6	14	22	39	−17	36	
12	Kysucké Nové Mesto	30	8	11	11	38	37	+1	35	
13	Bánová	30	8	9	13	26	36	−10	33	
14	Veľký Krtíš	30	6	11	13	37	45	−8	29	
15	Turany	30	7	5	18	33	61	−28	26	Relegation to 4. liga
16	Fiľakovo	30	6	7	17	22	52	−30	25	Relegation to 4. liga

Rules for classification: 1) points; 2) goal difference; 3) number of goals scored.

== 3. liga Východ ==
=== Locations ===
Location of teams in 3. liga Východ 2010–11

=== League table ===
Pos	Team	Pld	W	D	L	GF	GA	GD	Pts	Promotion or relegation
1	Lokomotíva Košice (P)	30	20	5	5	60	25	+35	65	Promotion to 3. liga
2	Moldava nad Bodvou "B" (P)	30	19	6	5	69	38	+31	63	Promotion to 3. liga
3	Giraltovce	30	15	6	9	38	30	+8	51	
4	Snina	30	14	6	10	60	43	+17	48	
5	Vyšné Opátske	30	12	8	10	53	47	+6	44	
6	Svit	30	13	4	13	45	38	+7	43	
7	Svidník	30	11	7	12	49	47	+2	40	
8	Sabinov	30	11	7	12	44	52	−8	40	
9	Stropkov	30	11	5	14	38	49	−11	38	
10	Spišské Podhradie	30	10	8	12	43	48	−5	38	
11	Barca	30	10	6	14	40	47	−7	36	
12	Topoľany	30	10	4	16	44	53	−9	34	
13	Nižný Hrušov	30	10	4	16	48	64	−16	34	
14	Veľký Šariš	30	10	4	16	52	63	−11	34	
15	Košice - Krásna	30	9	6	15	28	46	−18	33	
16	Vysoké Tatry	30	8	8	14	38	59	−21	32	Relegation to 4. liga

Rules for classification: 1) points; 2) goal difference; 3) number of goals scored.
(P) Promoted
