= 2021–22 Slovak Cup =

Slovnaft Cup

Tournament details
- Country: Slovakia

Final positions
- Champions: Spartak Trnava
- Runners-up: Slovan Bratislava

The 2021–22 Slovak Cup was the 53rd edition of the football competition.

Slovan Bratislava were the defending champions, defeating Žilina in the 2021 final.

Slovan Bratislava managed to advance to the final again, but were defeated by their rivals Spartak Trnava.

Spartak Trnava earned automatic qualification for the UEFA Europa Conference League second qualifying round.

== Format ==
The Slovak Cup is played as a knockout tournament. All matches that end up as a draw after 90 minutes are decided by penalty shoot-outs. All rounds are played as one-off matches except the semi-finals, which are played over two legs.

== Preliminary round ==
Team 1	Score	Team 2
18 July 2021
Družstevník Rybky	5–0	Mokrý Háj
24 July 2021
Domino Bratislava	0–8	Rača
Boleráz	0–3	Spartak Myjava
Buzitka	1–4	Fiľakovo
Baník Handlová	0–1	Baník Prievidza
Harichovce	4–0	Spisske Vlachy
Komjatice	0–2	Veľké Lovce
Veľký Cetín	0–7	Nitra
Družstevník Zvončín	2–2 (4–5 p)	Blava 1928
Slovan Modra	3–3 (6–5 p)	Pezinok
25 July 2021
Jednota Sokol Chocholná-Velčice	2–4	Nové Mesto nad Váhom
Baník Brodské	0–6	Druzstevnik Radimov
Bešeňov	1–1 (2–4 p)	Nové Zámky
Bitarova	1–2	Olympia Bobrov
Bolesov	2–4	Trenčianske Stankovce
Tatran Bystré	0–2	Hencovce
Tatran Chlebnice	1–0	Tvrdošín
Chminianska Nova Ves	3–0	Košická Nová Ves
Družstevník Dlhá nad Oravou	1–4	Stráňavy
Partizán Domaniža	0–1	Crystal Lednické Rovne
Dudince	0–1	Banská Štiavnica
Jesenské	4–2	Detva
Gbeľany	2–0	Teplička nad Váhom
Hontianske Nemce	1–1 (5–4 p)	Lokomotiva Zvolen
Horna Krupa	0–0 (4–2 p)	Vrbové
Vápeč Horná Poruba	1–1 (4–5 p)	Partizán Prečín
Hrochoť	0–8	Podkonice
Iskra Hnúšťa	0–1	Poltár
Iskra Holíč	w/o	Nafta Gbely
Jasenov	1–2	Spartak Medzilaborce
Jelka	1–3	Thermál Veľký Meder
Kanianka	2–0	Dolné Vestenice
Kechnec	4–4 (2–4 p)	Čaňa
Ladomerská Vieska	1–8	Kováčová
Lastomir	0–6	Pavlovce nad Uhom
Likavka	0–0 (5–4 p)	Rosina
Lokomotíva Košice	1–0	Gelnica
Magura Vavrečka	1–2	Závažná Poruba
Maraton Sena	2–2 (2–4 p)	Mladosť Kalša
Melčice-Lieskové	0–4	Častkovce
Strojár Krupina	0–1	Málinec
Nevidzany	1–4	Lipová
Okoličná	2–2 (9–8 p)	Hurbanovo
Opatovská Nová Ves	0–2	Novohrad Lučenec
Oravan	1–3	Liptovská Štiavnica
Fintice	2–1	Marhan
Teplička	1–1 (4–3 p)	Spišská Nová Ves
Piešťany	1–5	Trebatice
Plevník-Drienové	1–1 (3–5 p)	Spartak Kvašov
Podhajska	0–4	Družstevník Veľké Ludince
Slovan Poproč	1–7	Spartak Medzev
Predmier	0–3	Kysucké Nové Mesto
Ptava NV Ptičie	1–2	Slovan Belá nad Cirochou
Rožňava	0–1	Dvorníky-Včeláre
Šaca	0–2	Tahanovce
Široké	2–5	Pivovar Veľký Šariš
Báb	4–1	Kovarce
Selce	2–4	Šalková
Veľké Zálužie	3–1	Slovan Hlohovec
Slovenská Ľupča	2–2 (6–5 p)	Sokol Medzibrod
Sokol Zubrohlava	0–5	Dolný Kubín
Pokrok Stará Bystrica	1–2	Čierne
Švošov	1–2	Dynamo Diviaky
Tatran Lubica	0–3	Gerlachov
Slovan Skalité	1–3	Kotesova
Višňové	0–3	Javorník Makov
Tomasovce	0–0 (1–3 p)	Badín
Topoľčany	0–4	Solčany
Torysa	0–6	Slovan Sabinov
Trstice	4–0	Neded
Tatran Uhrovec	1–1 (1–4 p)	Spartak Bánovce nad Bebravou
Vazec	2–3	Brezno
Veľká Lomnica	5–2	Levoča
Veľký Krtíš	3–1	Pliesovce
Vikartovce	2–2 (4–3 p)	Poprad
Vojčice	3–0	Budkovce
Slovan Zemianske Kostolany	0–5	Tovarníky
Casta	3–4	Svätý Jur
Kráľová	0–1	MŠK Senec
Karpaty Limbach	1–3	Tomášov
Lozorno	0–2	Láb
Malacky	2–1	Devinska Nová Ves
NMŠK 1922 Bratislava	1–4	Dunajská Lužná
Velky Biel	1–2	Nová Dedinka
Slovan Viničné	0–0 (3–4 p)	Vrakuňa
Tisovec	0–1	Rimavská Sobota
28 July 2021
Olováry	3–0	Hajnáčka
Jarovce	1–1 (8–7 p)	Inter Bratislava
29 July 2021
Ferenc Borsa	4–0	Lokomotíva Michaľany

== First round ==
Team 1	Score	Team 2
30 July 2021
Svätý Jur	0–7	Tomášov
31 July 2021
Častkovce	4–1	Nové Mesto nad Váhom
Kanianka	2–5	Baník Prievidza
Okoličná	1–1 (5–4 p)	Družstevník Veľké Ludince
Láb	0–5	Malacky
Vrakuňa	0–0 (3–4 p)	MŠK Senec
1 August 2021
Nafta Gbely	2–0	Spartak Myjava
Spartak Kvašov	0–2	KOVO Beluša
Lipová	0–2	Trstice
Veľké Zálužie	1–1 (1–4 p)	Blava 1928
Partizán Prečín	0–2	Považská Bystrica
3 August 2021
Rača	2–1	Dunajská Lužná
Solčany	1–1 (4–5 p)	Tovarníky
4 August 2021
Stráňavy	1–2	Dolný Kubín
Banská Štiavnica	1–1 (2–4 p)	Spartak Bánovce nad Bebravou
Brezno	1–2	Závažná Poruba
Tatran Chlebnice	0–5	Tatran Oravské Veselé
Čierne	w/o	Olympia Bobrov
Dynamo Diviaky	1–4	Fomat Martin
Jesenské	3–0	Veľký Krtíš
Gbeľany	1–6	Kysucké Nové Mesto
Horna Krupa	2–3	Trebatice
Jarovce	0–2	Thermál Veľký Meder
Málinec	1–1 (5–3 p)	Podkonice
Kotesova	0–3	Jednota Bánová
Likavka	2–1	Liptovská Štiavnica
Slovan Modra	1–3	Nová Dedinka
Poltár	0–1	Fiľakovo
Rimavská Sobota	0–2	Novohrad Lučenec
Družstevník Rybky	1–3	Druzstevnik Radimov
Javorník Makov	2–2 (3–4 p)	Tatran Krásno nad Kysucou
Slovenská Ľupča	5–0	Hontianske Nemce
Trenčianske Stankovce	w/o	Crystal Lednické Rovne
Veľké Lovce	2–2 (3–2 p)	Nové Zámky
Báb	0–1	Nitra
Šalková	0–0 (3–5 p)	Kováčová
5 August 2021
Olováry	2–2 (5–6 p)	Badín
11 August 2021
Chminianska Nova Ves	0–4	Slovan Sabinov
Dvorníky-Včeláre	0–3	Spartak Medzev
Ferenc Borša	1–5	Pavlovce nad Uhom
Harichovce	1–1 (3–4 p)	Vikartovce
Hencovce	0–3	Vranov nad Topľou
Spartak Medzilaborce	2–0	Slovan Belá nad Cirochou
Fintice	0–5	Tatran Prešov
Teplička	0–2	Lokomotíva Košice
Tahanovce	0–6	Mladosť Kalša
Veľká Lomnica	2–0	Gerlachov
Pivovar Veľký Šariš	2–3	Lipany
Vojčice	2–4	Čaňa

== Second round ==
Team 1	Score	Team 2
18 August 2021
Blava 1928	0–4	Šamorín
MŠK Senec	3–1	Tomášov
Veľké Lovce	0–6	DAC Dunajská Streda
24 August 2021
Jesenské	0–3	Dukla Banská Bystrica
Fomat Martin	0–5	Pohronie
Tatran Prešov	2–2 (5–6 p)	Michalovce
Tovarníky	0–3	Zlaté Moravce
25 August 2021
Badín	1–2	Novohrad Lučenec
Baník Prievidza	1–3	Púchov
Spartak Bánovce nad Bebravou	0–6	Podbrezova
KOVO Beluša	0–3	Spartak Trnava
Crystal Lednické Rovne	0–0 (4–5 p)	Častkovce
Druzstevnik Radimov	0–0 (2–4 p)	Senica
Fiľakovo	0–4	Košice
Čaňa	0–4	Humenné
Nafta Gbely	1–1 (5–3 p)	Nitra
Tatran Krásno nad Kysucou	0–5	Liptovský Mikuláš
Likavka	2–5	Dolný Kubín
Lokomotíva Košice	2–1	Vikartovce
Malacky	0–3	Skalica
Spartak Medzev	2–1	Mladosť Kalša
Spartak Medzilaborce	2–2 (4–1 p)	Pavlovce nad Uhom
Nová Dedinka	0–1	Rača
Okoličná	0–8	Komárno
Olympia Bobrov	1–3	Kysucké Nové Mesto
Tatran Oravské Veselé	0–3	Ružomberok
Považská Bystrica	2–0	Dubnica
Slovenská Ľupča	0–2	Kováčová
Trebatice	2–1	Petržalka
Trstice	0–3	Sereď
Veľká Lomnica	1–3	Slovan Sabinov
Thermál Veľký Meder	0–3	Trenčín
Vranov nad Topľou	2–1	Slavoj Trebišov
Závažná Poruba	2–4	Námestovo
1 September 2021
Lipany	1–1 (6–5 p)	Partizán Bardejov
4 September 2021
Málinec	0–7	Slovan Bratislava
22 September 2021
Jednota Bánová	0–0 (5–6 p)	Žilina

== Third round ==
Team 1	Score	Team 2
14 September 2021
Slovan Sabinov	0–4	Michalovce
Pata	0–4	Spartak Trnava
15 September 2021
Kysucké Nové Mesto	0–6	Ružomberok
21 September 2021
Námestovo	0–3	Pohronie
Šamorín	0–0 (4–2 p)	Sereď
Rača	0–3	Trenčín
22 September 2021
Častkovce	1–1 (3–5 p)	Púchov
Nafta Gbely	0–3	Senica
Komárno	0–0 (4–3 p)	DAC Dunajská Streda
Lokomotíva Košice	1–2	Lipany
Spartak Medzev	1–3	Humenné
Spartak Medzilaborce	0–0 (1–4 p)	Vranov nad Topľou
Novohrad Lučenec	2–5	Košice
Podbrezova	2–1	Dukla Banská Bystrica
Trebatice	0–9	Zlaté Moravce
28 September 2021
Považská Bystrica	1–2	Žilina
29 September 2021
MŠK Senec	1–7	Skalica
6 October 2021
Dolný Kubín	3–2	Liptovský Mikuláš
9 October 2021
Kováčová	0–2	Slovan Bratislava

== Fourth round ==
The draw for the fourth round was held on 7 October 2021.

Team 1	Score	Team 2
19 October 2021
Kezmarok	0–3	Skalica
20 October 2021
Lehota	0–1	Pohronie
26 October 2021
Podbrezova	2–2 (6–7 p)	Spartak Trnava
27 October 2021
Slovan Galanta	1–2	Humenné
Šašová	3–2	Rovinka
Belá Dulice	0–1	Vranov nad Topľou
Slávia TU Košice	0–5	Slovan Bratislava
Príbelce	0–3	Trenčín
Ružomberok	1–0	Lipany
2 November 2021
Bešeňová	1–5	Senica
Dolný Kubín	2–3	Žilina
3 November 2021
Slavoj Spišská Belá	0–12	Šamorín
10 November 2021
Komárno	2–1	Michalovce
21 November 2021
Rohožník	0–2	Košice
12 February 2022
Tesla Stropkov	1–2	Púchov
15 February 2022
Spišské Podhradie	0–7	Zlaté Moravce

== Round of 16 ==
The draw for the round of 16 was held on 2 December 2021.

Team 1	Score	Team 2
1 March 2022
Sásová	0–3	Senica
Ružomberok	0–2	Slovan Bratislava
Zlaté Moravce	1–0	Púchov
Košice	1–2	Spartak Trnava
2 March 2022
Šamorín	1–1 (2–4 p)	Skalica
Vranov nad Topľou	1–2	Pohronie
Trenčín	3–1	Humenné
9 March 2022
Žilina	2–1	Komárno

== Quarter-finals ==
The draw for the quarter-finals was held on 3 March 2022.

15 March 2022	Slovan Bratislava	2–0	Zlaté Moravce	Bratislava
16:00 CET (UTC+01:00)	Weiss Jr. 53'; Zmrhal 73'	Report		Stadium: Tehelné pole Attendance: 1,327; Referee: Michal Očenáš

15 March 2022	Trenčín	2–0	Skalica	Trenčín
19:00 CET (UTC+01:00)	Hollý 61'; Kmeť 85'	Report		Stadium: Štadión Sihoť; Attendance: 1,199; Referee: Peter Ziemba

16 March 2022	Žilina	0–0 (1–4 p)	Spartak Trnava	Žilina
14:00 CET (UTC+01:00)		Report		Stadium: Štadión pod Dubňom; Attendance: 2,684; Referee: Ladislav Prešinský
	Penalties
	Slebodník (penalty missed); Iľko (penalty missed); Kopas (penalty scored)		(penalty scored) Bukata; (penalty scored) Savvidis; (penalty scored) Iván; (penalty scored) Prochazka

16 March 2022	Senica	3–2	Pohronie	Senica
16:00 CET (UTC+01:00)	Oršula 6'; Totka 48'; Sulaeman 86'	Report	Mayounga 1' (o.g.); Mihalík 19'	Stadium: Štadión FK Senica; Attendance: 1,289; Referee: Michal Smolák

== Semi-finals ==
The draw for the semi-finals took place on 18 March 2022.

=== First leg ===
6 April 2022	Spartak Trnava	3–0	Senica	Trnava
19:45 CEST (UTC+02:00)	Pavlík 16' (o.g.); Kóša 72'; Azevedo 90'	Report		Stadium: Anton Malatinský Stadium; Attendance: 1,359; Referee: Erik Gemzický

7 April 2022	Trenčín	0–0	Slovan Bratislava	Trenčín
19:45 CEST (UTC+02:00)		Report	Barseghyan (red card) 87'	Stadium: Štadión Sihoť; Attendance: 1,448; Referee: Michal Očenáš

=== Second leg ===
19 April 2022	Slovan Bratislava	2–1 (2–1 agg.)	Trenčín	Bratislava
19:30 CEST (UTC+02:00)	Agbo 9'; Mustafić 40'	Report	Ikoba 69'	Stadium: Tehelné pole Attendance: 1,644; Referee: Peter Kráľovič

20 April 2022	Senica	0–4 (0–7 agg.)	Spartak Trnava	Senica
19:30 CEST (UTC+02:00)		Report	Bamidele 1'; Ramadan 20'; Iván 60' (pen.); Olejník 68'	Stadium: Štadión FK Senica; Attendance: 615; Referee: Michal Smolák

== Final ==
8 May 2022
17:30 (UTC+2)

Slovan Bratislava	1–2 (a.e.t.)	Spartak Trnava
Mustafić 49'	Report	Bukata 52'; Azevedo 114'

Tehelné pole, Bratislava
Attendance: 10,411
Referee: Peter Ziemba

== See also ==
- 2021–22 Slovak First Football League
- 2022–23 UEFA Europa Conference League
