= 2020–21 3. Liga (Slovakia) =

3. Liga
- Season: 2020–21

The 2020–21 3. Liga (Slovakia) was the 28th edition of the third tier 3. Liga (Slovakia) annual football tournament since its establishment in 1993. 64 teams contested being divided into four geographic groups of 16 teams each: 3. liga Bratislava, 3. liga Západ (West), 3. liga Stred (Central), 3. liga Východ (Eastern).

== League tables ==
=== Bratislava ===
| Pos | Team | Pld | W | D | L | GF | GA | GD | Pts | Promotion or relegation |
|---|---|---|---|---|---|---|---|---|---|---|
| 1 | Rohožník | 15 | 11 | 4 | 0 | 32 | 6 | +26 | 37 | Promotion to 2. Liga |
| 2 | Rača | 15 | 10 | 1 | 4 | 37 | 19 | +18 | 31 | |
| 3 | Inter Bratislava | 15 | 10 | 1 | 4 | 53 | 21 | +32 | 31 | |
| 4 | Rovinka | 15 | 8 | 3 | 4 | 34 | 19 | +15 | 27 | |
| 5 | Malacky | 15 | 8 | 3 | 4 | 28 | 14 | +14 | 27 | |
| 6 | Senec | 15 | 8 | 1 | 6 | 20 | 27 | −7 | 25 | |
| 7 | Tomášov | 15 | 7 | 1 | 7 | 20 | 35 | −15 | 22 | |
| 8 | Slovan Ivanka pri Dunaji | 15 | 6 | 4 | 5 | 26 | 23 | +3 | 22 | |
| 9 | Pezinok | 15 | 6 | 3 | 6 | 32 | 30 | +2 | 21 | |
| 10 | Slovan Most pri Bratislave | 15 | 6 | 2 | 7 | 24 | 32 | −8 | 20 | |
| 11 | Bernolákovo | 15 | 5 | 4 | 6 | 24 | 24 | 0 | 19 | |
| 12 | Dunajská Lužná | 15 | 3 | 5 | 7 | 18 | 28 | −10 | 14 | |
| 13 | Lokomotíva Devínska Nová Ves | 15 | 3 | 3 | 9 | 13 | 38 | −25 | 12 | |
| 14 | Báhoň | 15 | 2 | 5 | 8 | 17 | 27 | −10 | 11 | |
| 15 | Kalinkovo | 15 | 3 | 1 | 11 | 22 | 38 | −16 | 10 | |
| 16 | Rusovce | 15 | 2 | 3 | 10 | 15 | 34 | −19 | 9 | Relegation to 4. Liga |

Updated to match(es) played on end of the season. Source: Soccerway
Rules for classification: 1) Points; 2) Head-to-head points; 3) Head-to-head goal difference; 4) Head-to-head away goals scored; 5) Play-off.

=== Západ (West) ===
| Pos | Team | Pld | W | D | L | GF | GA | GD | Pts | Promotion or relegation |
|---|---|---|---|---|---|---|---|---|---|---|
| 1 | Spartak Myjava | 15 | 10 | 3 | 2 | 27 | 11 | +16 | 33 | None promoted, because FC Nitra did not obtain license for 2. liga season. |
| 2 | Beluša | 15 | 9 | 5 | 1 | 33 | 13 | +20 | 32 | |
| 3 | Dynamo Malženice | 15 | 9 | 4 | 2 | 41 | 16 | +25 | 31 | |
| 4 | ViOn Zlaté Moravce-Vráble B | 15 | 9 | 3 | 3 | 21 | 11 | +10 | 30 | |
| 5 | Považská Bystrica | 15 | 8 | 5 | 2 | 36 | 14 | +22 | 29 | |
| 6 | Slovan Duslo Šaľa | 15 | 8 | 1 | 6 | 26 | 16 | +10 | 25 | |
| 7 | Marcelová | 15 | 7 | 2 | 6 | 22 | 23 | −1 | 23 | |
| 8 | Častkovce | 15 | 7 | 2 | 6 | 20 | 19 | +1 | 23 | |
| 9 | Nové Mesto nad Váhom | 15 | 6 | 2 | 7 | 17 | 20 | −3 | 20 | |
| 10 | Kalná nad Hronom | 15 | 4 | 5 | 6 | 16 | 21 | −5 | 17 | |
| 11 | Imeľ | 15 | 3 | 5 | 7 | 11 | 17 | −6 | 14 | |
| 12 | Crystal Lednické Rovne | 15 | 4 | 2 | 9 | 15 | 35 | −20 | 14 | |
| 13 | FC Nitra B | 15 | 3 | 3 | 9 | 24 | 35 | −11 | 12 | |
| 14 | Nové Zámky | 15 | 3 | 2 | 10 | 13 | 40 | −27 | 11 | |
| 15 | Družstevník Veľké Ludince | 15 | 2 | 4 | 9 | 9 | 27 | −18 | 10 | |
| 16 | Slovan Galanta | 15 | 2 | 4 | 9 | 12 | 25 | −13 | 10 | Relegation to 4. Liga |

Updated to match(es) played on end of the season. Source: Soccerway
Rules for classification: 1) Points; 2) Head-to-head points; 3) Head-to-head goal difference; 4) Head-to-head away goals scored; 5) Play-off.

=== Stred (Central) ===
| Pos | Team | Pld | W | D | L | GF | GA | GD | Pts | Promotion or relegation |
|---|---|---|---|---|---|---|---|---|---|---|
| 1 | Námestovo | 15 | 12 | 2 | 1 | 38 | 10 | +28 | 38 | Promotion to 2. Liga |
| 2 | Rakytovce | 15 | 11 | 2 | 2 | 31 | 13 | +18 | 35 | |
| 3 | Tatran Oravské Veselé | 15 | 10 | 3 | 2 | 28 | 10 | +18 | 33 | |
| 4 | Rimavská Sobota | 15 | 9 | 1 | 5 | 32 | 22 | +10 | 28 | |
| 5 | Fomat Martin | 15 | 8 | 2 | 5 | 28 | 18 | +10 | 26 | |
| 6 | Jednota Bánová | 15 | 8 | 2 | 5 | 37 | 17 | +20 | 26 | |
| 7 | Tatran Krásno nad Kysucou | 15 | 7 | 3 | 5 | 30 | 29 | +1 | 24 | |
| 8 | Prameň Kováčová | 15 | 7 | 2 | 6 | 23 | 12 | +11 | 23 | |
| 9 | Baník Kalinovo | 15 | 5 | 4 | 6 | 19 | 19 | 0 | 19 | |
| 10 | Družstevník Liptovská Štiavnica | 15 | 6 | 1 | 8 | 28 | 42 | −14 | 19 | |
| 11 | Fiľakovo | 15 | 5 | 3 | 7 | 19 | 14 | +5 | 18 | |
| 12 | Novohrad Lučenec | 15 | 4 | 4 | 7 | 25 | 42 | −17 | 16 | |
| 13 | Liptovský Hrádok | 15 | 4 | 2 | 9 | 20 | 28 | −8 | 14 | |
| 14 | Nová Baňa-Žarnovica | 15 | 3 | 2 | 10 | 15 | 41 | −26 | 11 | |
| 15 | Čadca | 15 | 3 | 0 | 12 | 12 | 35 | −23 | 9 | |
| 16 | Lokomotíva Zvolen | 15 | 1 | 1 | 13 | 10 | 43 | −33 | 4 | Relegation to 4. Liga |

Updated to match(es) played on end of the season. Source: Soccerway
Rules for classification: 1) Points; 2) Head-to-head points; 3) Head-to-head goal difference; 4) Head-to-head away goals scored; 5) Play-off.

=== Východ (Eastern) ===
| Pos | Team | Pld | W | D | L | GF | GA | GD | Pts | Promotion or relegation |
|---|---|---|---|---|---|---|---|---|---|---|
| 1 | Humenné | 15 | 14 | 1 | 0 | 53 | 9 | +44 | 43 | Promotion to 2. Liga |
| 2 | Odeva Lipany | 15 | 11 | 4 | 0 | 42 | 10 | +32 | 37 | |
| 3 | Tatran Prešov | 15 | 10 | 1 | 4 | 42 | 17 | +25 | 31 | |
| 4 | Slávia TU Košice | 15 | 10 | 1 | 4 | 39 | 23 | +16 | 31 | |
| 5 | Vranov nad Topľou | 15 | 10 | 1 | 4 | 26 | 20 | +6 | 31 | |
| 6 | Mladosť Kalša | 15 | 8 | 1 | 6 | 45 | 26 | +19 | 25 | |
| 7 | Tesla Stropkov | 15 | 6 | 4 | 5 | 29 | 26 | +3 | 22 | |
| 8 | Družstevník Plavnica | 15 | 6 | 3 | 6 | 22 | 25 | −3 | 21 | |
| 9 | Spišská Nová Ves | 15 | 6 | 3 | 6 | 23 | 23 | 0 | 21 | |
| 10 | Snina | 15 | 5 | 2 | 8 | 23 | 23 | 0 | 17 | |
| 11 | Spišské Podhradie | 15 | 4 | 2 | 9 | 23 | 38 | −15 | 14 | |
| 12 | Sobrance - Sobranecko | 15 | 4 | 1 | 10 | 15 | 39 | −24 | 13 | |
| 13 | Slovan Giraltovce | 15 | 4 | 1 | 10 | 11 | 30 | −19 | 13 | |
| 14 | POKROK SEZ Krompachy | 15 | 3 | 3 | 9 | 18 | 42 | −24 | 12 | |
| 15 | Svidník | 15 | 2 | 2 | 11 | 10 | 46 | −36 | 8 | |
| 16 | Milénium Bardejovská Nová Ves | 15 | 2 | 0 | 13 | 15 | 39 | −24 | 6 | Relegation to 4. Liga |

Updated to match(es) played on end of the season. Source: Soccerway
Rules for classification: 1) Points; 2) Head-to-head points; 3) Head-to-head goal difference; 4) Head-to-head away goals scored; 5) Play-off.

== See also ==
- 2020–21 Slovak First Football League
- 2020–21 2. Liga (Slovakia)
- 2020–21 Slovak Cup
