= 2017 Slovak Cup final =

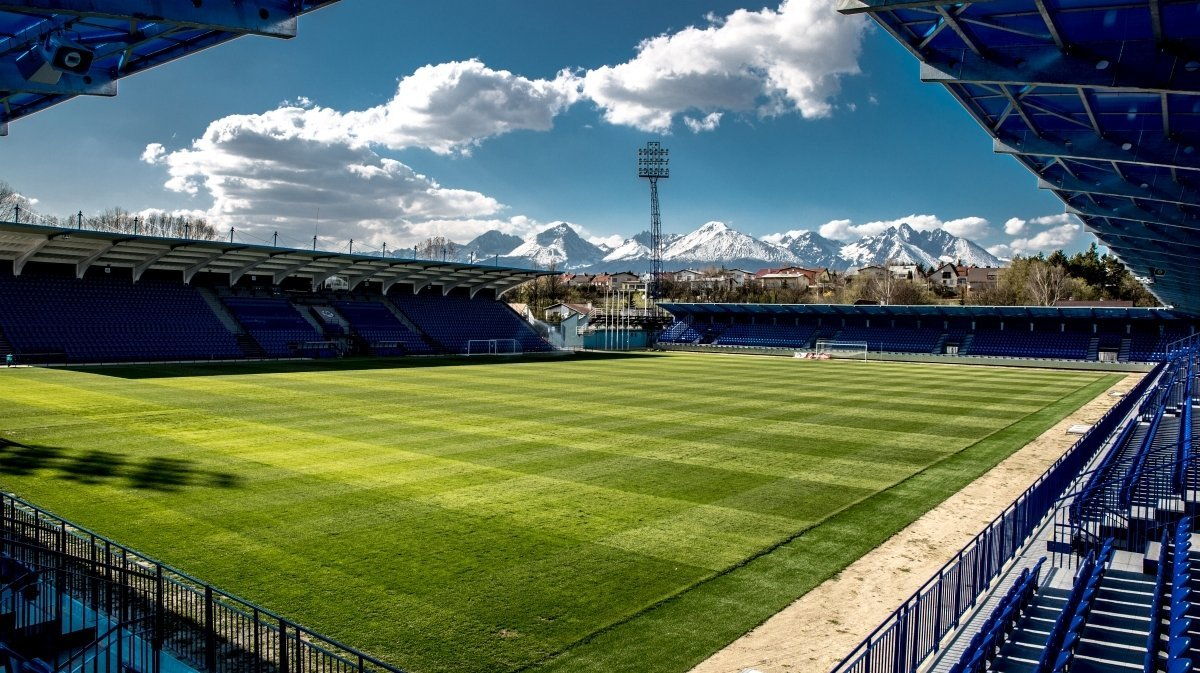
- The NTC Poprad in Poprad held the final
- Event: 2016–17 Slovak Cup
Skalica	Slovan Bratislava
0	3
- 90 min. game
- Date: 1 May 2017
- Venue: NTC Poprad, Poprad
- Referee: Pavol Chmura
- Attendance: 2,432

The 2017 Slovak Cup final (known as the Slovnaft Cup for sponsorship reasons) was the final match of the 2016–17 Slovak Cup, the 48th season of the top cup competition in Slovak football. The match was played at the NTC Poprad in Poprad on 1 May 2017 between MFK Skalica and ŠK Slovan Bratislava.

== Road to the final ==
Note: In all results below, the score of the finalist is given first (H: home; A: away).

MFK Skalica		Round	ŠK Slovan Bratislava
Opponent	Result	2016–17 Slovak Cup	Opponent	Result
FC Petržalka akadémia	5–1 (A)	Second Round	Vranov nad Topľou	0−0 (3–2 p) (A)
ŠTK 1914 Šamorín	2−0 (A)	Third Round	Tatran Oravské Veselé	6–1 (A)
Podbrezová	0−0 (12–11 p) (H)	Fourth Round	Slovenské Ďarmoty	3–0 (A)
Spartak Myjava	1−0 (H)	Round of 16	Družstevník Veľké Ludince	1–0 (A)
MŠK Žilina	3–2 (H)	Quarter-finals	AS Trenčín	3–1 (H)
FK Poprad	0–1 (A), 2–0 (H) (2–1 agg.)	Semi-finals	Zemplín Michalovce	2–1 (A), 1–0 (H) (2–1 agg.)

== Match ==
=== Details ===
1 May 2017
16:20 CEST (UTC+2)

MFK Skalica (2)	0–3	Slovan Bratislava (1)
	Report	Rundić 20'; Čavrić 62'; Soumah 76' (pen.)

NTC Poprad, Poprad
Attendance: 2,432
Referee: Pavol Chmura

MFK Skalica	Slovan Bratislava

GK	1	(Slovakia) Ján Čikoš-Pavličko	(yellow card) 75'
RB	17	(Slovakia) Ján Mizerák
CB	4	(Slovakia) Ladislav Szöcs
CB	19	(Slovakia) Pavol Majerník (c)
LB	6	(Slovakia) Lukáš Švrček		(substituted off) 68'
DM	13	(Slovakia) Lukáš Hlavatovič
RM	23	(Slovakia) Ádam Meszáros		(substituted off) 82'
CM	33	(Serbia) Filip Pankarićan
LM	36	(Slovakia) Lukáš Hruška		(substituted off) 82'
FW	8	(Slovakia) Blažej Vaščák
FW	11	(Slovakia) Daniel Šebesta
Substitutes:
GK	30	(Slovakia) Rudolf Bartal
MF	22	(Slovakia) Mário Vrábel		(substituted in) 82'
DF	41	(Czech Republic) Jakub Slaný
MF	15	(Slovakia) Ondrej Neoveský
FW	9	(Slovakia) Ľubomír Ulrich		(substituted in) 82'
FW	10	(Slovakia) Michal Jakubek
FW	18	(Serbia) Marko Milunović		(substituted in) 68'
Manager:
(Slovakia) Jozef Kostelník

GK	22	(Slovakia) Dominik Greif
RB	7	(Slovakia) František Kubík
CB	3	(Serbia) Milan Rundić	(yellow card) 85'
CB	19	(Slovakia) Kornel Saláta
LB	2	(Serbia) Boris Sekulić (c)
CM	4	(Montenegro) Vukan Savićević	(yellow card) 32'	(substituted off) 65'
CM	6	(Netherlands) Joeri de Kamps
AM	20	(Hungary) Tamás Priskin
AM	10	(Guinea) Seydouba Soumah
AM	24	(Slovakia) Samuel Šefčík	(yellow card) 56'	(substituted off) 58'
FW	45	(Serbia) Aleksandar Čavrić		(substituted off) 78'
Substitutes:
GK	30	(Slovakia) Martin Krnáč
MF	9	(Slovakia) Tomáš Kóňa		(substituted in) 65'
MF	17	(Netherlands) Ruben Ligeon
MF	77	(Netherlands) Lesly de Sa
FW	11	(Slovakia) Filip Oršula		(substituted in) 58'
FW	29	(Slovakia) Patrik Pinte
FW	33	(Slovakia) Róbert Vittek		(substituted in) 78'
Manager:
(Serbia) Ivan Vukomanović

Assistant referees:
Rastislav Žákech
Radoslav Bobko
Fourth official:
Juraj Lieskovský

Match rules

- 90 minutes.
- 30 minutes of extra time if necessary.
- Penalty shoot-out if scores still level.
