= TJ Višňové =

Slovak football club

- Full name: Telovýchovná Jednota Višňové
- Founded: May 1954; 72 years ago
- Ground: Futbalové ihrisko Višňové
- Capacity: 1,000 (500 seats)
- Owner: Municipality of Višňové
- League: 5. Liga

Telovýchovná Jednota Višňové, commonly referred to by a shortened version as TJ Višňové, is a Slovak football team based in Višňové, that currently plays in the 5. Liga. The club played its home games at the Futbalové ihrisko Višňové, which has a capacity of 500 seats. The club is currently managed by Robert Machyna.

TJ Višňové was founded in 1954, but organized football in the village dated back to 1935. The club’s biggest success is winning the Roľnícky noviny Cup in 1977. In 2025, Višňové returned to the fifth league after winning the title in the lower competition.

== History ==
=== 1953: Founding and early years ===
The beginning of organized football in Višňové dates back to May 1953, when the amateur footballers defeated neighboring club Stráňavé 3–2. Following the win, it was decided that Višňové would be registered in organized football. At that time, there was only III. class in the district, which had two groups and where TJ Višňové also played in.

=== 1960–1975: Golden years ===
In 1960, a league in the district of Žilina was established, second, third, and fourth classes were established, with TJ Višňové being placed in the third league, group A. The club did well and in the 1960/61 competition year they won the class and advanced to second league. The 1968/69 competition year was again a promotion year and Višňové reached the I.B class, group A of the Central Slovak Region. After five years of playing in this league, the club was promoted to I.A class in the 1973/74 season. TJ Višňové achieved another success in 1977, when they won the Roľnícky noviny Cup in Žabokreky. In the same year, they took part in a trip to Prague, where they played a match against Sparta Prague. They lost the game 5–1 on Sparta’s field, but in the second match they defeated Jánske Lázne with the same result.

=== 1978–1980: Decline of TJ Višňové ===
In the 1978/79 season, Višňové won the I.A class and advanced to the regional second division. After administrative intervention and the cancellation of the last match, MFK Ružomberok B would win promotion. The following years marked the gradual descent of Višňové football back to its former starting point, the III. class. Social changes, reorganization of competitions and the ubiquitous lack of finances also affected football in Višňové, which stabilized in terms of performance and gradually fought its way up to the I. class.

=== 2025–present: Recent years ===
In 2025, TJ Višňové won the 6. Liga, advancing to the 5. Liga. In the first round of the 2025–26 Slovak Cup, the club beat 3. Liga side MFK Dolný Kubín 4–3 on penalties after drawing the game 2–2 at their home ground. They continued the season in good form, being the only fifth-league team in central Slovakia not to have lost in the autumn. In October 2025, it was announced that the village of Višňové would receive a subsidy of €509,000 from the Sports Support Fund for the construction and modernization of sports infrastructure.

== Stadium ==
The club played its home games at the Futbalové ihrisko Višňové, which has a capacity of 1,000 people, of which 500 are seats.
