= Kyla Cole =

Slovak glamour model and actress (born 1978)

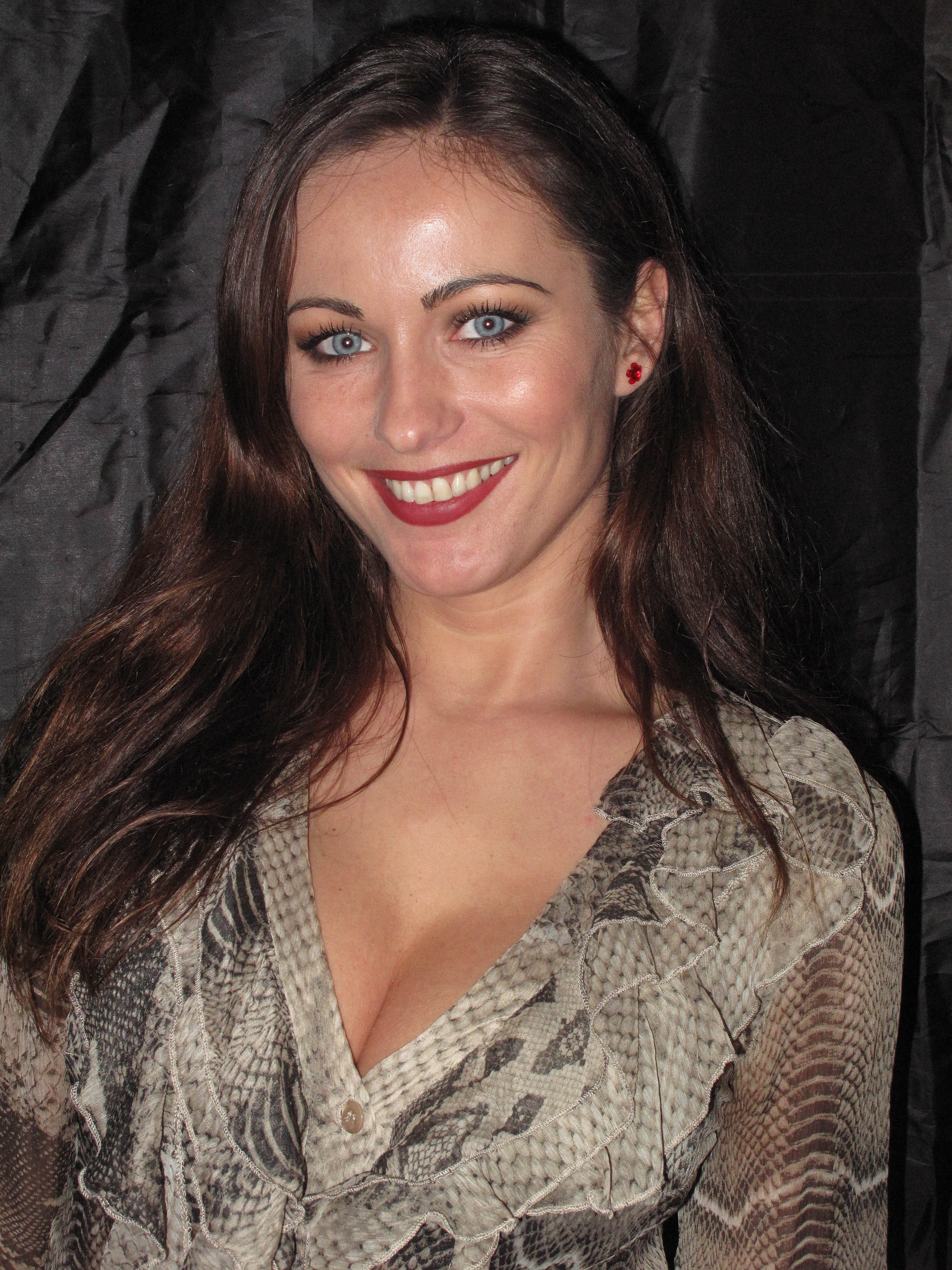
- Cole in 2010
- Born: Martina Jacová; November 10, 1978 (age 46); Ostrovany, Prešov, Slovakia
- Occupations: Glamour model; former actress
- Years active: 1999–2009

Martina Jacová (born November 10, 1978), known by her stage name Kyla Cole, is a Slovak glamour model, actress and former television presenter. She was named Penthouse Pet in March 2000.

== Early life ==
Kyla Cole was born in Prešov, Czechoslovakia (present Slovakia), and was her parents' first-born child.

== Career ==
Cole began her career in 1999, after winning the "Ms. Monticello Raceway Pageant", while working as a counselor at the Camp Na-Sho-Pa summer camp Bloomingburg, in upstate New York.

She has also been a part owner of a modeling agency.

=== Modeling ===
Cole was named Penthouse Pet of the Month in March 2000. Within a year, she had appeared on the covers of dozens of men's magazines. She was offered the position of Penthouse Pet of the Year, but had to decline because she was unable to obtain a US work visa.

Cole also appeared as Supergirl and Wonder Woman for live-action comic book website Superheroines.net.

=== Television ===
In May 2001 Cole was invited to participate as a surprise guest at the season finale of season 1 of Big Brother in Norway. She was invited because one of the male housemates had proclaimed Cole was his dream woman after seeing pictures of her, which had been posted on the walls in the house by the female housemates to cheer up another male housemate. The producers of the TV show hints of Cole's surprise appearance when they, to the male housemates despair, secretly removes the best picture of Cole, and 2 weeks before the season finale, proclaims that all will be revealed. During the season, two of the male housemates name in Cole's honor a pizza recipe after her.

In August 2003 Cole was chosen to host the weekly erotic TV show Láskanie, on the Slovak commercial TV station Markíza. She was replaced in April 2004.

=== Acting ===
Cole has starred in three movies with erotic film director Andrew Blake.

Between February and April 2005, Cole was in the Philippines shooting a local action movie, playing the lead female role of Karen. The working title was Rumble Boyz, but was changed to Rumble Boy upon release in April 2007.

=== Spokesmodel ===
In March 2005 Cole was the spokesmodel in a campaign to promote a new instant coffee product for the Slovak company Baliarne obchodu a.s. Poprad., being featured on billboards all around Slovakia. One of the billboards, displaying a scantily clad Cole with the slogan "For your enjoyment", was later convicted of breaching the standards of decency and morality by the Council for Advertising in Slovakia.

== Personal life ==
Cole claimed in interviews early in her career to be bisexual, but in an interview in 2010 she withdraws this, stating "To tell you the truth, I'm not bisexual. It was the marketing strategy regarding my pictures in the past."

In 2010 Cole was living in Slovakia, working as a model and taking care of her personal website.

=== Charity ===
Between April 2004 and January 2005, Cole did charity work, caring for an orphanage in Šarišské Michaľany, Slovakia.

== Filmography ==
Adult films
Year	Title	Studio	Director
2001	Blond & Brunettes	Studio A Entertainment	Andrew Blake
2001	Exhibitionists	Studio A Entertainment	Andrew Blake
2001	Penthouse: Pets In Paradise	Penthouse Video	Nicholas Guccione
2002	The Villa	Studio A Entertainment	Andrew Blake
2009	Dream Flicks	Digital Desire	J. Stephen Hicks
2009	Smoking Hot Girls	Studio A Entertainment	Andrew Blake

Mainstream films
Year	Title	Role	Director
2007	Rumble Boy	Karen	Ronnie Ricketts
