= MFK Žarnovica =

Slovak football club

- Full name: MFK Žarnovica
- Ground: Stadium MFK Žarnovica, Žarnovica, Slovakia
- Capacity: 15,000 (3000)
- President: Michal Daniš
- Head coach: Miroslav Leba
- League: 3. Liga
- 2013–2014: 5. liga Center – South, 1st (promoted)
- Website: http://www.sktomasov.sk/

MFK Žarnovica is a Slovak association football club located in Žarnovica. It currently plays in 3. liga (3rd tier in Slovak football system).

== Colors and badge ==
Its colors are black-white and red-yellow.
