= Daniel Šebesta =

Slovak footballer

Personal information
- Full name: Daniel Šebesta
- Date of birth: 24 October 1991 (age 35)
- Place of birth: Czechoslovakia
- Height: 1.85 m (6 ft 1 in)
- Position: Attacking midfielder

Team information
- Current team: Skalica
- Number: 11

Youth career
- –2004: TJ Nafta Gbely
- 2004–2007: FC Malacky
- 2007–2011: Bradlan Brezová pod Bradlom

Senior career*
Years	Team	Apps	(Gls)
2011–2022	Skalica	234	(77)
2022–	TJ Nafta Gbely		
- * Club domestic league appearances and goals as of 5 Dec 2022

Daniel Šebesta (born 24 October 1991) was a professional Slovak footballer who currently plays for amateur side TJ Nafta Gbely.

He is known for his time at Slovak First Football League club MFK Skalica, playing as an attacking midfielder. He played for the club for over eleven years.

== Club career ==
=== Early career ===
Šebesta started his career in his hometown club of TJ Nafta Gbely. He later played for FC Malacky and Brezová pod Bradlom. Šebesta was a part of the Brezová academy that historically got promoted to the first youth league in Slovakia. In 2010, he scored a double for Brezová in a 3–3 draw against his former club Nafta Gbely.

=== MFK Skalica ===
In 2011, Šebesta joined 2. Liga club MFK Skalica. He made his first league debut for Skalica against Zemplín Michalovce on 25 July 2015, coming off the bench as a substitute for Michal Gašparík. Šebesta scored his first career goal in a 4–1 defeat away to league champions Slovan Bratislava. He played in the 2016–2017 Slovak cup final in a 3–0 defeat to Slovan Bratislava. On 7 August 2018, Šebesta scored a hattrick against PŠC Pezinok, helping Skalica advance to the quarter-finals of the Slovak Cup.

In 2022, Šebesta retired from professional football, having one of the most appearances for Skalica. After a short spell in an amateur club from Hohenau, Austria, he returned to his first club TJ Nafta Gbely.

== Honors ==
- 2016–17 Slovak Cup: runners-up
