= ŠK Vrakuňa =

Slovak football club

- Full name: Športový Klub Vrakuňa Bratislava
- Founded: 1939
- Ground: Štadión ŠK Vrakuňa Bratislava, Vrakuňa, Bratislava
- Capacity: 1,500
- President: Andrej Ravasz
- Head coach: Vladimír Kinder
- League: 5. liga
- 2023–24: 4. liga, 16th (relegated)
- Website: http://www.skvrakuna.sk/

ŠK Vrakuňa is a Slovak football team, based in Vrakuňa, a borough of Bratislava. The club was founded in 1939. Club colors are blue and white. ŠK Vrakuňa home stadium is Štadión ŠK Vrakuňa with a capacity of 1,500 spectators.

== Historical names ==
- TJ Dunaj Vrakuňa (?)
- TJ Doprastav Vrakuňa (1980–1993)
- ŠK Vrakuňa Bratislava (1993–present)
