= Višňové, Žilina District =

Višňové
- Municipality
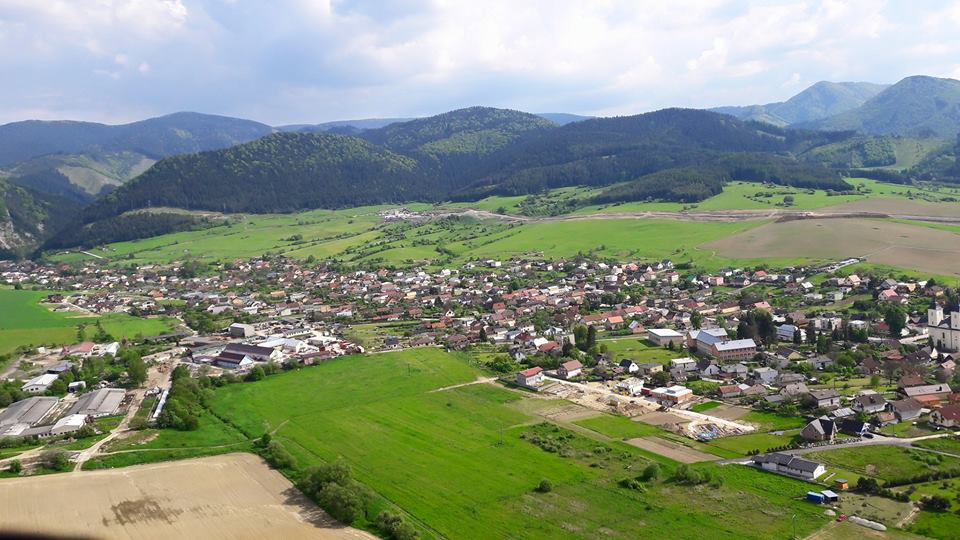

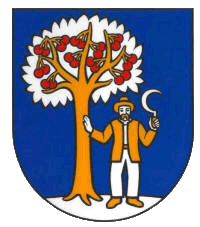
- Flag Coat of arms

- Location of Višňové in the Žilina Region Location of Višňové in Slovakia
- Coordinates: 49°9′36″N 18°47′11″E
- Country: Slovakia
- Region: Žilina Region
- District: Žilina District
- First mentioned: 1393

Area
  - Total: 15.17 km^{2} (5.86 sq mi)
- Elevation: 448 m (1,470 ft)

Population (2025)
  - Total: 2,988
- Time zone: UTC+1 (CET)
  - Summer (DST): UTC+2 (CEST)
- Postal code: 132 3
- Area code: +421 41
- Vehicle registration plate (until 2022): ZA
- Website: www.visnove.sk

Višňové is a village and municipality in Žilina District in the Žilina Region of northern Slovakia.

== History ==
The Earliest Evidence of Settlement

The oldest evidence of settlement in the vicinity of the village is a cremation burial ground from the Bronze Age, when people of the Lusatian culture inhabited the hill in neighboring Rosina, just a few hundred meters from the current border of Višňové's territory. The settlers of that time certainly moved beyond the defined space of their settlement. Archaeological research during highway construction revealed prehistoric pottery shards near the village, preliminarily dated to the Bronze and Iron Ages. During this survey, undated remains of burial mound structures were also discovered near the border with Turany's territory. Direct evidence of settlement in the area was also provided by Slavic burial mounds from the 9th century on the northern slopes of Hoblík hill, which were, however, destroyed by agricultural activity.

Medieval and Early Modern Period

In the 14th century, in connection with the so-called German and Wallachian colonization, the population density of the local region increased. Višňové bears traces of both types of settlement, as confirmed by the names of some parts of its territory (Goleštan, Štamriky, Grance...). The village is first mentioned in writing in 1393 as Wysnew, and is documented in 1438 as Wyssnowa, in 1439 as Felfalu, in 1474 as Wysnyewe, in 1598 as Wysnowe, and in Hungarian as Visnyó or Felsővisnyó (during the Hungarian period). The village belonged to the Lietava estate, and for a time to the Strečno estate, as it lay on their border. A Gothic church with a wooden tower is mentioned from 1514, which was later replaced by the current church.

Around 1550, the inhabitants of the village were of Protestant faith. The people of Višňové made their living through agriculture, cattle breeding, and day labor. An urbarium from 1539 provides evidence of the village's feudal status, which at that time had 24 houses, a parish, and a school. The application of the principle "cuius regio, eius religio" (whose realm, his religion) meant that, especially in the 17th century, the local inhabitants were sometimes Catholic and other times Lutheran. Thanks to miraculous healings in the Church of St. Nicholas at the end of the 17th century (from 1674), it became a pilgrimage site, about which a small book was also published by the parish priest of Rosina. In the 18th century, the old church seemed cramped to pilgrims, and therefore the current church was built between 1769 and 1782. From 1787, or 1788, a parish was re-established in Višňové, as during the Reformation period, it had become a filial of the Rosina parish due to a shortage of priests. With the support of patrons from the nobility who had a manor house and lands in the village (the Ordódy family, the Kremnica burgher, mining official, and former mayor Ján Zafiri, and others), as well as the royal court of Maria Theresa and the church itself, two 36-meter-high towers were added to the church between 1816 and 1820.

19th and Early 20th Century

The description of the military mapping of Hungary from the end of the 18th century mentions a church and a noble court, as well as a stream and densely forested surroundings with mighty trees. The roads to Rosina and Trnové were in good condition, while the road to Turie was passable depending on the weather due to its muddy surface. Great damage to the village was caused by earthquakes in the mid-19th century, and the population was also outraged by the revision of the village's boundary lines and land consolidation, carried out in 1867. Revival was brought by the landowner, construction engineer, banker, and entrepreneur Rudolf Krupec, who bought the Ordódy manor and promoted modern principles of management on the estate. At his invitation, the future president of Czechoslovakia, T. G. Masaryk, spent some time here. People returning from overseas bought properties and, in addition to much-needed money, brought new knowledge, skills, and abilities that changed life in the village and enjoyed general respect. At the end of the 19th and beginning of the 20th century, a wave of immigrants from Poland came to the village, traveling south through the Kysucké Beskydy mountains in search of better living conditions.

20th Century and Beyond

After the poverty brought by World War I, there was a gradual revival; plays were performed, and a firefighters' organization was established with its own band. During the First Czechoslovak Republic, it was an agricultural village, preserving weaving, embroidery, basketry, beekeeping, and sheep breeding. The village was repeatedly visited by Andrej Hlinka and Jozef Tiso, who, as president of the first Slovak Republic, was the keynote speaker during the men's pilgrimage in 1939. World War II was inscribed in black letters in the village's history, especially on September 3, 1944, when, after partisans fired on a military patrol, the Germans burned several houses and led many men to the church for execution. The last units of the German army on Hoblík and Valientovo dielo were eliminated by the 1st Brigade of the 1st Czechoslovak Army Corps on April 29, 1945.

The entire twentieth century was a period of fundamental changes and the greatest transformations of the village. A road from Žilina was built, and electricity was introduced in 1932. After World War II, a kindergarten was built, a regular bus line was introduced, telephone service was installed, a municipal radio was built, and in 1959 a new elementary school building was completed. The standard of living was raised by the construction of a catchment water supply system, a shopping center, a football field, a swimming pool, and a ski resort on Holé dielo. The inhabitants built a cultural center themselves, which was approved on December 15, 1982, when Višňové was already a city district of Žilina (1980 to 1991). After the regime change, there was development in the entrepreneurial activities of the inhabitants, and the first businesses and companies were established. During the celebrations of the 600th anniversary of the first written mention, the village was visited by President Michal Kováč. The village's gasification was completed, cable television was introduced, a new football field was built, and the swimming pool area was reconstructed. As part of the church reconstruction, the church towers were repaired in September 2005, and the plaster was repaired and dried. In 2008, the sewerage system was completed, sidewalks were added to the village, new road surfaces were laid, and a new gym and multi-functional playground were built.

== Geography ==
The municipality lies at an altitude of 448 metres (1,470 ft) and covers an area of 15.17 km^{2} (5.86 sq mi) (2025).

== Population ==
Population statistic (10 years)
Year	1995	2005	2015	2025
Count	2443	2532	2797	2988
Difference		+3.64%	+10.46%	+6.82%

Population statistic
Year	2024	2025
Count	3013	2988
Difference		−0.82%

It has a population of 2988 people (31 December 2025).

=== Ethnicity ===
Census 2021 (1+ %)
Ethnicity	Number	Fraction
Slovak	2854	95%
Not found out	133	4.42%
Total	3004	

In year 2021 was 3004 people by ethnicity 2854 as Slovak, 133 as Not found out, 26 as Czech, 7 as Other, 6 as Polish, 5 as Rusyn, 5 as Russian, 3 as Korean, 2 as German, 1 as Irish, 1 as Austrian, 1 as Moravian and 1 as Hungarian.

Note on population: The difference values of population numbers in the table "Population statistic" and in the sections "Ethnicity" & "Religion" is caused by the use of various statistical methods.

=== Religion ===
Census 2021 (1+ %)
Religion	Number	Fraction
Roman Catholic Church	2264	75.37%
None	515	17.14%
Not found out	128	4.26%
Evangelical Church	33	1.1%
Total	3004	

In year 2021 was 3004 people by religion 2264 from Roman Catholic Church, 515 from None, 128 from Not found out, 33 from Evangelical Church, 15 from Greek Catholic Church, 10 from Christian Congregations in Slovakia, 9 from Ad hoc movements, 6 from Eastern Orthodox Church, 5 from Other, 4 from United Methodist Church, 3 from Calvinist Church, 3 from Paganism and natural spirituality, 3 from Other and not ascertained christian church, 3 from Buddhism, 1 from Jehovah's Witnesses, 1 from Church of the Brethren and 1 from Church of Jesus Christ of Latter-day Saints.
