= ŠKM Liptovský Hrádok =

Slovak football club

- Full name: ŠKM Liptovský Hrádok
- Founded: 1992
- Ground: Stadium pri Belej Liptovský Hrádok, Liptovský Hrádok, Slovakia
- Capacity: 1,950 (450)
- President: Roman Kapitáň
- Head coach: Ján Haspra
- League: 7. Liga (Slovakia)
- 2016–17: 3. liga - Middle, 1st
- Website: http://www.skmlhradok.sk/

ŠKM Liptovský Hrádok is a Slovak association football club located in Liptovský Hrádok. It currently plays in 3. liga (3rd tier in Slovak football system). The club was founded in 1992.
