= OŠFK Šarišské Michaľany =

Slovak football club

- Full name: OŠFK Šarišské Michaľany
- Founded: 1949
- Ground: Za Torysou Stadium, Šarišské Michaľany
- Capacity: 400 (268 seats)
- Chairman: Peter Dugas
- Head coach: Vacant
- Website: http://osfksarisskemichalany.webnode.sk/

OŠFK Šarišské Michaľany is a Slovak former football team, based in the town of Šarišské Michaľany. The club's colours are green, white, blue, yellow.
