= Liptovská Štiavnica =

Village and municipality in Slovakia

- Municipality
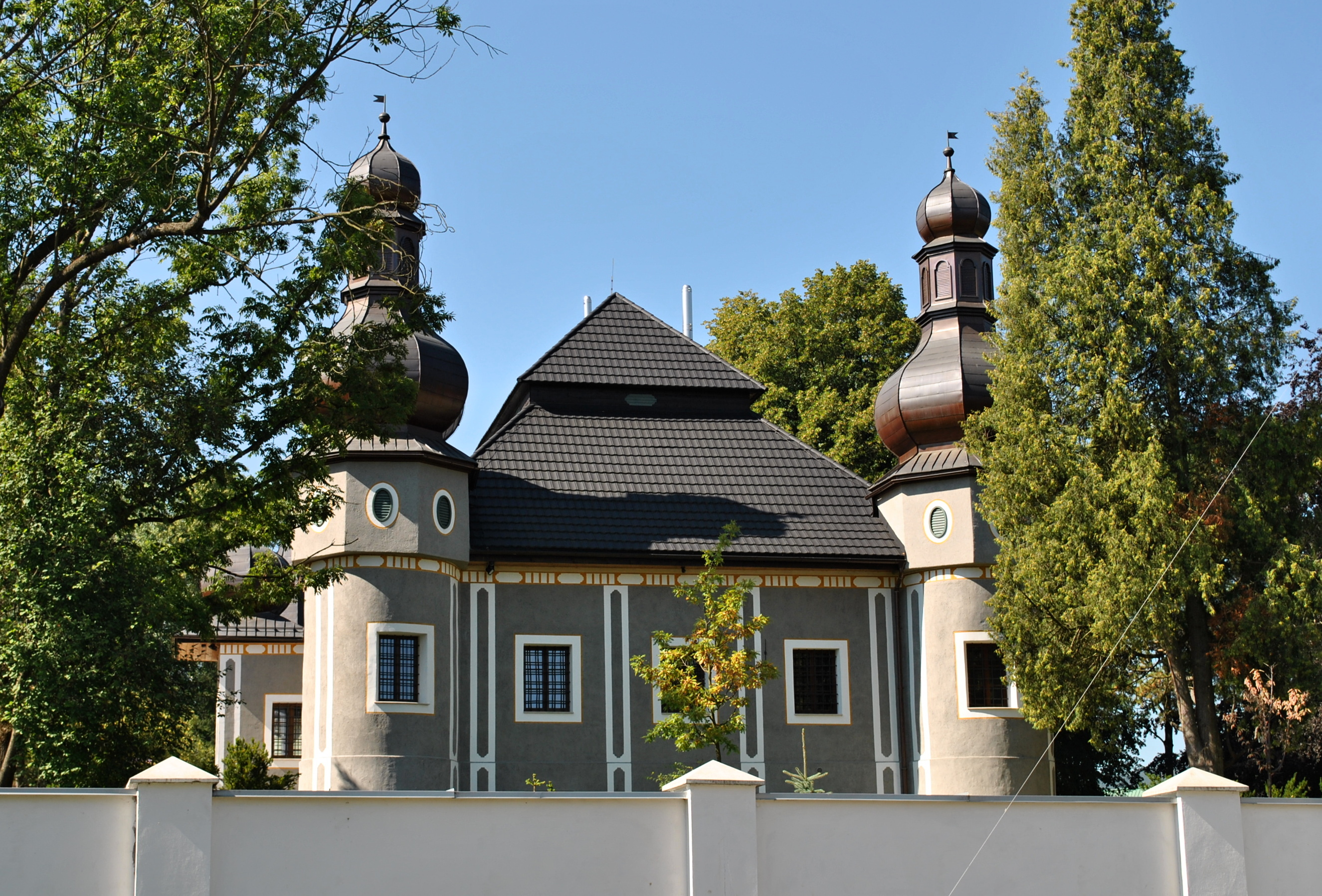
- Rakovski family manor

- Flag

- Location of Liptovská Štiavnica in the Žilina Region Location of Liptovská Štiavnica in Slovakia
- Coordinates: 49.05°N 19.37°E
- Country: Slovakia
- Region: Žilina Region
- District: Ružomberok District
- First mentioned: 1300

Area
  - Total: 32.35 km^{2} (12.49 sq mi)
- Elevation: 561 m (1,841 ft)

Population (2025)
  - Total: 1,461
- Time zone: UTC+1 (CET)
  - Summer (DST): UTC+2 (CEST)
- Postal code: 347 1
- Area code: +421 44
- Vehicle registration plate (until 2022): RK
- Website: www.liptovskastiavnica.sk

Liptovská Štiavnica (Hungarian: Nagyselmec) is a village and municipality in Ružomberok District in the Žilina Region of northern Slovakia.

== History ==
In historical records the village was first mentioned in 1300.

== Geography ==
The municipality lies at an altitude of 561 metres (1,841 ft) and covers an area of 32.35 km^{2} (12.49 sq mi) (2025).

== Population ==
Population statistic (10 years)
Year	1995	2005	2015	2025
Count	806	909	1138	1461
Difference		+12.77%	+25.19%	+28.38%

Population statistic
Year	2024	2025
Count	1439	1461
Difference		+1.52%

It has a population of 1461 people (31 December 2025).

=== Ethnicity ===
Census 2021 (1+ %)
Ethnicity	Number	Fraction
Slovak	1274	98%
Not found out	22	1.69%
Total	1300	

In year 2021 was 1300 people by ethnicity 1274 as Slovak, 22 as Not found out, 10 as Czech, 8 as Other, 3 as Russian, 2 as Romani, 2 as Polish, 2 as Hungarian, 1 as Serbian, 1 as Rusyn, 1 as Canadian and 1 as Bulgarian.

Note on population: The difference values of population numbers in the table "Population statistic" and in the sections "Ethnicity" & "Religion" is caused by the use of various statistical methods.

=== Religion ===
Census 2021 (1+ %)
Religion	Number	Fraction
Roman Catholic Church	924	71.08%
None	207	15.92%
Evangelical Church	104	8%
Not found out	34	2.62%
Total	1300	

In year 2021 was 1300 people by religion 924 from Roman Catholic Church, 207 from None, 104 from Evangelical Church, 34 from Not found out, 7 from Greek Catholic Church, 6 from Other, 4 from Christian Congregations in Slovakia, 4 from Buddhism, 3 from Ad hoc movements, 2 from Jewish community, 2 from Eastern Orthodox Church, 2 from Other and not ascertained christian church and 1 from United Methodist Church.
