= Veľký Šariš =

- Municipality
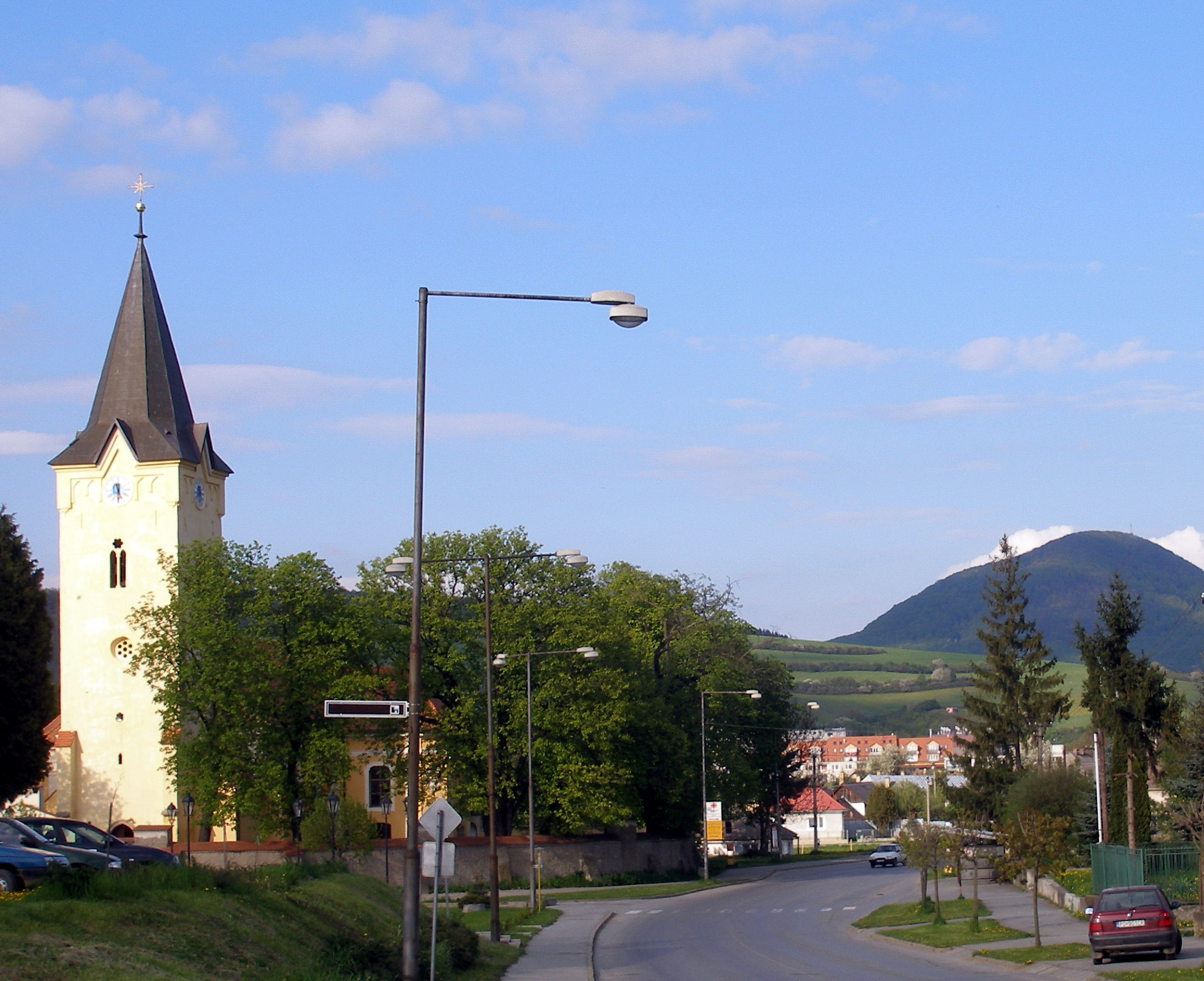

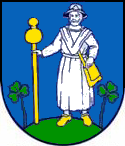
- Flag Coat of arms

- Location of Veľký Šariš in the Prešov Region Location of Veľký Šariš in Slovakia
- Coordinates: 49.04°N 21.19°E
- Country: Slovakia
- Region: Prešov Region
- District: Prešov District
- First mentioned: 1217

Government
  - Mayor: JUDr. Viliam Kall

Area
  - Total: 25.69 km^{2} (9.92 sq mi)
- Elevation: 281 m (922 ft)

Population (2025)
  - Total: 7,035
- Time zone: UTC+1 (CET)
  - Summer (DST): UTC+2 (CEST)
- Postal code: 822 1
- Area code: +421 51
- Vehicle registration plate (until 2022): PO
- Website: www.velkysaris.sk

Veľký Šariš is a small town near Prešov in eastern Slovakia. The town is known as the site of the largest brewery in Slovakia – Šariš Brewery.

== Etymology ==
The etymology of the name is uncertain. Hungarian historians and linguists prefer the theory that it is derived from the Hungarian word sár or sáros (muddy). Slovak historians and linguists assume that the name comes from pre-Hungarian period and is of Slavic or even older origin.

== Geography ==
The municipality lies at an altitude of 281 metres (922 ft) and covers an area of 25.69 km^{2} (9.92 sq mi) (2025). It is located on the Torysa river, 6 kilometres (4 mi) north-north-west from Prešov. There are ruins of Šariš Castle above the city, which were reconstructed in recent years and serve as place for various cultural events, such as music festivals or film festivals.

== History ==
The area has been inhabited since prehistoric times. A Slavic settlement on the castle foot hill is dated to the 9th–10th century, other settlements were unearthed in the area of the town (9th–10th century, 10th–11th century, later abandoned settlement dated to the 12th–13th century) and at the location Dzikov potok (8th–9th century). The first written mention of Veľký Šariš dates back to 1217 (Sarus) The town was a royal town then a landlord town (since 1465).

== Population ==
Historical population
Year	Pop.	±%
1970	3,986	—
1980	4,157	+4.3%
1991	3,534	−15.0%
2001	4,018	+13.7%
2011	5,292	+31.7%
2021	6,471	+22.3%
Source: Censuses

Population statistic (10 years)
Year	1995	2005	2015	2025
Count	3566	4643	5913	7035
Difference		+30.20%	+27.35%	+18.97%

Population statistic
Year	2024	2025
Count	6976	7035
Difference		+0.84%

It has a population of 7035 people (31 December 2025).

=== Ethnicity ===
Census 2021 (1+ %)
Ethnicity	Number	Fraction
Slovak	6218	96.09%
Romani	639	9.87%
Not found out	142	2.19%
Rusyn	102	1.57%
Total	6471	

In year 2021 was 6471 people by ethnicity 6218 as Slovak, 639 as Romani, 142 as Not found out, 102 as Rusyn, 47 as Ukrainian, 39 as Czech, 28 as Other, 10 as German, 7 as Russian, 6 as Italian, 5 as Polish, 5 as French, 4 as Hungarian, 3 as English, 2 as Jewish, 2 as Serbian, 2 as Croatian, 1 as Silesian, 1 as Austrian, 1 as Moravian, 1 as Greek and 1 as Bulgarian.

Note on population: The difference values of population numbers in the table "Population statistic" and in the sections "Ethnicity" & "Religion" is caused by the use of various statistical methods.

=== Religion ===
Census 2021 (1+ %)
Religion	Number	Fraction
Roman Catholic Church	4578	70.75%
None	981	15.16%
Greek Catholic Church	393	6.07%
Evangelical Church	178	2.75%
Not found out	148	2.29%
Eastern Orthodox Church	77	1.19%
Total	6471	

In year 2021 was 6471 people by religion 4578 from Roman Catholic Church, 981 from None, 393 from Greek Catholic Church, 178 from Evangelical Church, 148 from Not found out, 77 from Eastern Orthodox Church, 24 from Church of the Brethren, 19 from Apostolic Church, 14 from Ad hoc movements, 12 from Other, 12 from Seventh-day Adventist Church, 8 from Calvinist Church, 8 from Christian Congregations in Slovakia, 5 from Other and not ascertained christian church, 5 from Jehovah's Witnesses, 4 from Buddhism, 2 from Paganism and natural spirituality, 2 from United Methodist Church and 1 from Jewish community.

== Economy ==
Šariš Brewery is located in the town. The brewery was built in 1964 and is part of Asahi Breweries. The brewery has around 550 employees.

== FC Pivovar Veľký Šariš ==
FC Pivovar Veľký Šariš
- Full name: FC Pivovar Veľký Šariš
- Founded: 1919; 107 years ago
- Ground: Stadium FC Pivovar Veľký Šariš; Veľký Šariš
- Capacity: 1,000 (500 seats)
- President: František Sabol
- Head coach: Martin Bystroň
- League: 5. liga
- 2015–16: 4th

FC Pivovar Veľký Šariš is a Slovak football team, based in the town. The club was founded in 1919.

== Twin towns – sister cities ==
Veľký Šariš is twinned with:

- Nyírtelek, Hungary
- Grybów, Poland
- Rakoshino, Ukraine
