= Šarišské Michaľany =

- Municipality
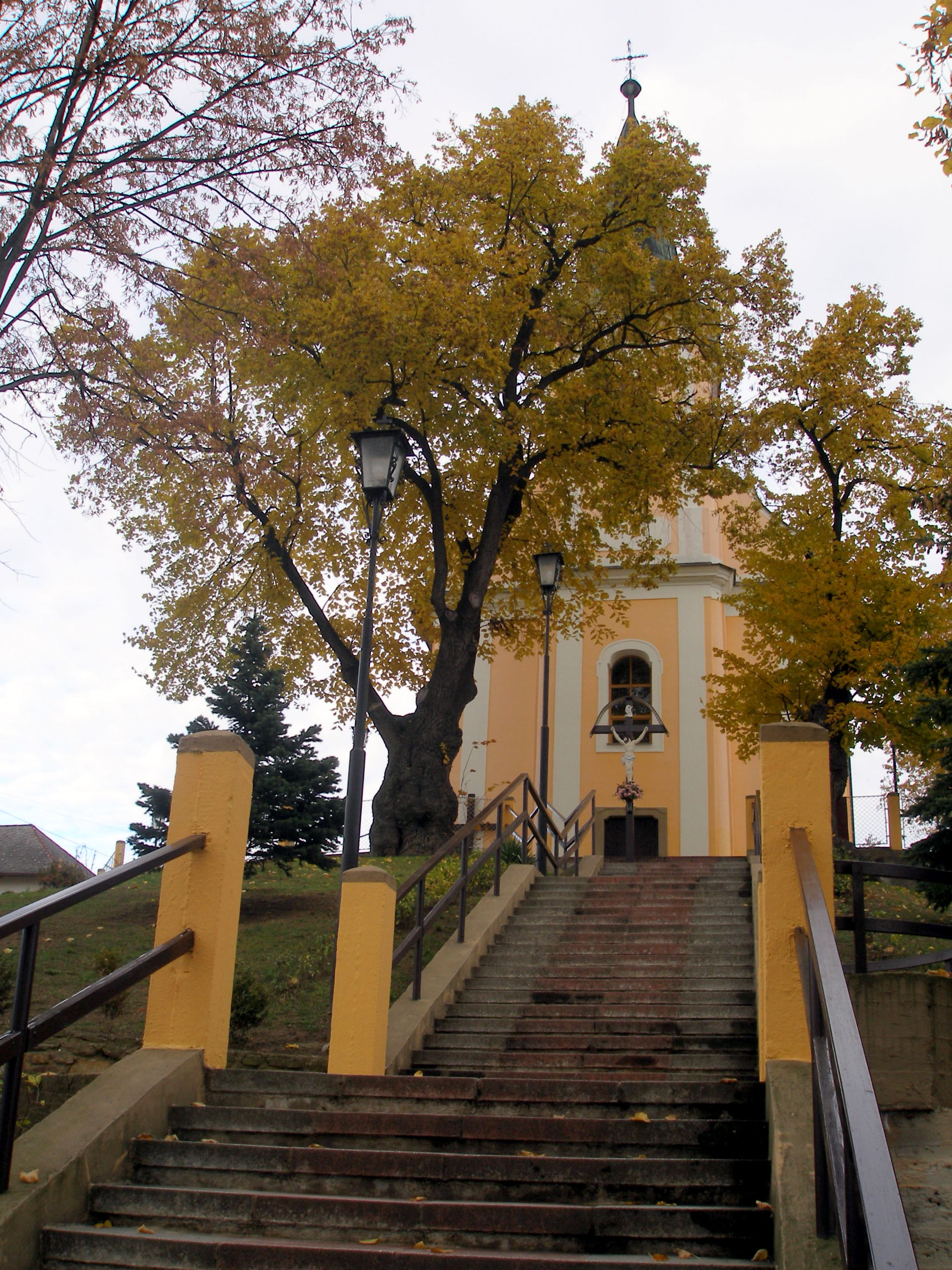

- Flag

- Location of Šarišské Michaľany in the Prešov Region Location of Šarišské Michaľany in Slovakia
- Coordinates: 49.07°N 21.14°E
- Country: Slovakia
- Region: Prešov Region
- District: Sabinov District
- First mentioned: 1248

Area
  - Total: 9.33 km^{2} (3.60 sq mi)
- Elevation: 298 m (978 ft)

Population (2025)
  - Total: 2,675
- Time zone: UTC+1 (CET)
  - Summer (DST): UTC+2 (CEST)
- Postal code: 822 2
- Area code: +421 51
- Vehicle registration plate (until 2022): SB
- Website: www.sarisskemichalany.sk

Šarišské Michaľany is a village and municipality in Sabinov District in the Prešov Region of north-eastern Slovakia.

== History ==
In historical records the village was first mentioned in 1248.

== Geography ==
The municipality lies at an altitude of 298 metres (978 ft) and covers an area of 9.33 km^{2} (3.60 sq mi) (2025).

== Population ==
Population statistic (10 years)
Year	1995	2005	2015	2025
Count	2642	2719	2874	2675
Difference		+2.91%	+5.70%	−6.92%

Population statistic
Year	2024	2025
Count	2695	2675
Difference		−0.74%

It has a population of 2675 people (31 December 2025).

=== Ethnicity ===
Census 2021 (1+ %)
Ethnicity	Number	Fraction
Slovak	2590	93.87%
Not found out	141	5.11%
Romani	118	4.27%
Rusyn	52	1.88%
Total	2759	

In year 2021 was 2759 people by ethnicity 2590 as Slovak, 141 as Not found out, 118 as Romani, 52 as Rusyn, 12 as Czech, 9 as Ukrainian, 7 as Other, 5 as Russian, 2 as Polish, 2 as Hungarian, 1 as Jewish, 1 as Romanian, 1 as Austrian, 1 as German and 1 as French.

Note on population: The difference values of population numbers in the table "Population statistic" and in the sections "Ethnicity" & "Religion" is caused by the use of various statistical methods.

=== Religion ===
Census 2021 (1+ %)
Religion	Number	Fraction
Roman Catholic Church	2086	75.61%
None	238	8.63%
Greek Catholic Church	182	6.6%
Not found out	140	5.07%
Evangelical Church	46	1.67%
Eastern Orthodox Church	28	1.01%
Total	2759	

In year 2021 was 2759 people by religion 2086 from Roman Catholic Church, 238 from None, 182 from Greek Catholic Church, 140 from Not found out, 46 from Evangelical Church, 28 from Eastern Orthodox Church, 8 from Christian Congregations in Slovakia, 7 from Jehovah's Witnesses, 6 from Apostolic Church, 5 from Calvinist Church, 4 from Ad hoc movements, 3 from Old Catholic Church, 3 from Other, 2 from Other and not ascertained christian church and 1 from United Methodist Church.
