= FK Spartak Bánovce nad Bebravou =

Slovak football club

- Full name: FK Spartak Bánovce nad Bebravou
- Founded: 1931
- Ground: Štadión FK Spartak Bánovce nad Bebravou, Bánovce nad Bebravou
- Capacity: 4,000
- Chairman: Ľuboš Ševčík
- Head coach: Ondrej Šmelko
- League: 4. liga
- 2015–16: 4th
- Website: http://spartakbanovce.sk/

FK Spartak Bánovce nad Bebravou is a Slovak football team, based in the town of Bánovce nad Bebravou. The club was founded in 1931.
