= MFK Slovan Giraltovce =

Slovak football club

- Full name: MFK Slovan Giraltovce
- Founded: 1916
- Ground: Štadión Giraltovce, Giraltovce
- Capacity: 2,000
- Chairman: Emil Mati
- Head coach: Tomáš Suslo
- League: 5. liga Sever (East)
- 2025–26 6. liga (East): 1st (promoted)

MFK Slovan Giraltovce is a Slovak football team, based in the town of Giraltovce. The club was founded in 1916.

== Famous coach ==
- (Slovakia) Jozef Bubenko
