= TJ Sklotatran Poltár =

Slovak football club

- Full name: Telovýchovná jednota Sklotatran Poltár
- Founded: 1921
- Ground: Štadión TJ Sklotatran Poltár, Poltár
- Capacity: 400 (80 seats)
- League: VI. liga SsFZ
- 2025–26: 3rd
- Website: https://sportnet.sme.sk/futbalnet/k/tj-sklotatran-poltar/

TJ Sklotatran Poltár is a Slovak football team, based in the town of Poltár. In 2021, the club celebrated the 100th year anniversary. The club also include 5 youth teams and first team. Club colours are red and white.

First team play at VI. liga SsFZ gr. D

U19 - IV. liga U19 SsFZ gr. south

U15 - II. liga U15 SsFZ gr. south

U13 - II. liga U13 SsFZ gr. south

Club have also team U11 and team U9.
