= MFK Baník Veľký Krtíš =

Slovak football club

- Full name: MFK Baník Veľký Krtíš
- Nickname(s): Baník
- Founded: 2018
- Ground: Štadión Baník Veľký Krtíš, Veľký Krtíš
- Capacity: 2,500 (800 seats)
- Chairman: Jozef Magdič
- Manager: Štefan Dohnálek
- League: 4. liga
- 2015–16: 12th

MFK Baník Veľký Krtíš is a Slovak football team, based in the town of Veľký Krtíš.
