= FC Malacky =

Slovak football club

- Full name: FC Malacky
- Founded: 2013; 13 years ago Daniel Greif, Oto Kožuch, Peter Iffka, Peter Mikula
- Ground: Zámocký park Malacky, Malacky, Slovakia
- Capacity: 2,500 (500 seats)
- Head coach: Štefan Horný, Dušan Rupec
- League: 3. Liga (Bratislava) A-team, V.liga B-team
- 2015–16: 4. liga (Bratislava), 2nd (promoted)
- Website: https://www.fcmalacky.sk/

FC Malacky is a Slovak association football club located in Malacky. It currently plays in 3. Liga (Bratislava) (3rd level).
