= TJ Partizán Domaniža =

Slovak football club

- Full name: Telovýchovná jednota Partizán Domaniža
- Founded: 1948; 77 years ago
- Ground: Štadión TJ Partizán Domaniža, Domaniža
- Capacity: 500
- Manager: Milan Svoboda
- League: V. liga Severozápad HUMMEL ZsFZ
- 2021-22: 8th (IV. liga Severozápad ZSFZ)
Home colours	Away colours

Telovýchodná jednota Partizán Domaniža, commonly known as TJ Partizán Domaniža is a Slovak football team, based in the village of Domaniža. It plays in V. liga Severozápad HUMMEL ZsFZ The club was founded in 1948.

On 27 August 2022, the first team played a friendly match with the Qatar national football team in Vienna.
