= FK CSM Tisovec =

Slovak football club

- Full name: FK CSM Tisovec
- Founded: 1912
- Ground: Štadión FK CSM Tisovec, Tisovec
- Capacity: 1000
- Chairman: Marián Oravec
- Manager: Tibor Tokár
- League: 5. liga
- 2015–16: 6th

FK CSM Tisovec is a Slovak football team, based in the town of Tisovec. The club was founded in 1912.

== Club history ==
The greatest club success are, if FK Tisovec fought the promotion to 2nd Slovak competition (divisions) in Slovakia, in 2009/2010 season fought the promotion to Slovak Third League. The club played two memories matches against Slovan Bratislava (1944) and Slavia Prague (1947). In this time, Czech-Austrian international footballer Josef Bican played for Slavia.

=== Club colours ===
Club colours are blue - yellow.
