= MFK Slovan Sabinov =

Slovak football club

- Full name: MFK Slovan Sabinov
- Founded: 1921; 105 years ago
- Ground: Štadión MFK Slovan Sabinov, Sabinov
- Capacity: 3,000 (560 seats)
- Chairman: Pavol Šaršala
- Manager: Peter Bašista
- League: 4. liga
- 2025-26, 13th (relegated): 7th

MFK Slovan Sabinov is a Slovak football team, based in the town of Sabinov.

== Players ==
=== Current squad ===
As of 30 July 2021. Note: Flags indicate national team as defined under FIFA eligibility rules; some limited exceptions apply. Players may hold more than one non-FIFA nationality.

No.	Pos.	Nation	Player
1	GK	SVK	Martin Lipčák
—	DF	SVK	Peter Bašista
