= MŠK Námestovo =

Slovak football club

- Full name: Mestský športový Klub Námestovo
- Nickname: emeška
- Founded: 1931; 95 years ago
- Ground: Štadión MŠK Námestovo, Námestovo
- Capacity: 2,000
- Chairman: Andrej Stašiniak
- Coach: Marián Beňadik
- League: 3. Liga
- 2025–26: 3. liga, 2.nd
- Website: http://www.msknamestovo.sk
Home colours	Away colours

MŠK Námestovo is a Slovak football team, based in the town of Námestovo. The club was founded in 1931.

== Honours ==
- Slovak third division (Group Middle) (1993–)
  - Winners (1): 2020–21

== Current squad ==
Note: Flags indicate national team as defined under FIFA eligibility rules; some limited exceptions apply. Players may hold more than one non-FIFA nationality.

No.	Pos.	Nation	Player
1	GK	SVK	Tomáš Lešňovský
2	DF	SVK	Marcel Pikoš
3	DF	SVK	Martin Habiňák
4	DF	SVK	Michal Čiernik
5	MF	SVK	Ľubomír Jaššo
6	MF	SVK	Marián Čiernik
7	MF	SVK	Samuel Kurtulík
8	DF	SVK	Juraj Siman
9	MF	SVK	Lukáš Čecho
10	MF	SVK	Lukáš Kubica

No.	Pos.	Nation	Player
11	FW	SVK	Marek Žákovič
12	MF	SVK	Patrik Jagnešák
13	MF	SVK	Rastislav Jagnešák
14	DF	SVK	Martin Buckulčík
15	MF	SVK	Šimon Mydlár
16	MF	SVK	Jaroslav Kormaňák
17	DF	SVK	Marek Banas
18	GK	SVK	Daniel Kubica
19	FW	SVK	Samuel Kormaňák
20	GK	SVK	Tomáš Smataník

For recent transfers, see List of Slovak football transfers winter 2021–22.

== Notable managers ==
- (Slovakia) Pavol Strapáč (2018–2021)
- (Slovakia) Miroslav Trnka (2021)
- (Slovakia) Vladimír Cifranič (Sep 2021-Dec 2021)
- (Slovakia) Roman Marčok (Jan 2022-)
