= ŠK Závažná Poruba =

Slovak football club

- Full name: ŠK Závažná Poruba
- Founded: 1931
- Ground: Štadión ŠK Závažná Poruba, Závažná Poruba
- League: 4. liga
- 2015–16: 10th

ŠK Závažná Poruba is a Slovak football team, based in the village of Závažná Poruba. The club was founded in 1931.
