= MŠK Kysucké Nové Mesto =

Slovak football club

- Full name: MŠK Kysucké Nové Mesto
- Founded: 1948
- Ground: Štadión Kysucké Nové Mesto, Kysucké Nové Mesto
- League: 4. liga
- 2025–26: 13th relegated

MŠK Kysucké Nové Mesto is a Slovak football team, based in the town of Kysucké Nové Mesto. The club was founded in 1948.

== Honours ==
=== Domestic ===
Czechoslovakia

- 1.SNL (1st Slovak National football league) (1969–1993)
  - Winners (1): 1972-73
