= FK Čadca =

Slovak football club

- Full name: FK Čadca
- Founded: 1921; 105 years ago
- Ground: Stadium FK Čadca, Čadca
- Capacity: 10,000 (600 seats)
- League: 3. liga
- 2013–14: 11th

FK Čadca is a Slovak football team, based in the town of Čadca. The club was founded in 1921.

The men's team currently plays in the 4. Liga. The club consists of approximately 200 players, most of whom are youth players playing in various competitions.

== History ==
FK Čadca was founded in 1921. In the past the club played in the Slovak National Football League, the second division of Czechoslovakia. The name of the football club in the past was TJJ ZZO Čadca and was later renamed to FK Čadca.

== Stadium ==
FK Čadca currently plays all its home matches in the sports complex on Športovcom Street which has a capacity of 10,000 seats, of which 600 are seats.
