= Football in Slovakia =

- Country: Slovakia
- Governing body: Slovak Football Association
- National team: Slovakia
- First played: 1863

National competitions
- FIFA World Cup; UEFA European Championship; UEFA Nations League

Club competitions
- List: League; 1. liga; 2. liga; 3. liga; 4. liga; 5. liga; Cups Slovak Cup

International competitions
- UEFA Champions League; UEFA Europa League; UEFA Europa Conference League; UEFA Super Cup

Slovakia has participated in international football as an independent nation ever since 1993 when Czechoslovakia was divided into two new states. Slovakia qualified to the FIFA World Cup for the first time in 2010, where the side upset perennial power Italy and lost in the Round of 16. Since independence, they qualified for the UEFA European Championship for their first time in 2016. Football is the most popular sport in the Slovak Republic. Approximately half of the Slovak people are interested in football.

== Football Association ==
The Slovak Football Association was a member of FIFA from April 1939 to 1945 and resumed in 1994.

== League football ==
The Slovak club's football tournament is held every season in the Slovak First Football League. The first Slovak football league was formed in its current form in 1993, when the Czechoslovak league was discontinued after the end of the federation with the Czech Republic. In 2007-08 there was an average of approximately 3000 spectators per game. The clubs sell their players to financially stronger clubs from western Europe. Examples of players that have succeeded in notable leagues are Marek Hamšík, former captain of Italian club SSC Napoli, Peter Pekarík who captains Bundesliga side Hertha BSC and Martin Škrtel, a well-known former Liverpool centre-back. Moreover, over the last few years more and more youngsters have been given the chance to perform regularly in the league before being transferred abroad. For example Leon Bailey, Milan Škriniar, Stanislav Lobotka and Samuel Kalu all played in the Slovak league.

The record champion is ŠK Slovan Bratislava with 13 titles, followed by MŠK Žilina with 7 titles.

The second-tier football league in Slovakia is called 2. Liga and 16 teams compete in it. The third-tier league (known as 3. Liga) consists of four divisions of which three (division East, division Middle & division Bratislava) are of 16 teams and the other one (division West) consists of 18 teams.

In 2010, MŠK Žilina became the third Slovak club to participate in the Champions League, where they were eliminated in the group stage.

=== System ===
As of (the start of) the 2026–27 season:

Level Clubs	League(s) / Division(s)			
1; 12	I. Liga; 12 clubs			
2; 16	II. Liga; 16 clubs			
3; 44	III. Liga; West; 16 clubs		III. Liga; Center; 14 clubs	III. Liga; East; 14 clubs
4; 60	IV. Liga; Bratislava (BFZ); 16 clubs	IV. Liga; West (ZsFZ); 16 clubs	IV. Liga; Center (SsFZ); 14 clubs	IV. Liga; East (VsFZ); 14 clubs
5; 104	V. Liga (BFZ); 16 clubs	V. Liga (ZsFZ); North-West - 16 clubs South-East - 16 clubs	V. Liga (SsFZ); North - 14 clubs South - 14 clubs	V. Liga (VsFZ); North - 14 clubs South - 14 clubs
6; 223	VI. Liga (BFZ); Bratislava-city - 14 clubs Bratislava-country - 14 clubs	VI. Liga (ZsFZ); North - 14 clubs West - 15 clubs South - 10 clubs East - 16 clubs Centre - 14 clubs	VI. Liga (SsFZ); Group A - 14 clubs Group B - 14 clubs Group C - 14 clubs Group D - 14 clubs	VI. Liga (VsFZ); Podtatranská - 14 clubs Šarišská - 14 clubs Zemplínska - 14 clubs Košicko-Gemerská - 14 clubs Vihorlatsko-Dukelská - 14 clubs
7 8 9	VII. Liga (BFZ); Bratislava-city - 10 clubs Bratislava-country - 9 clubs	Sub-regional football unions Dunajská Streda; VII. Liga; VIII. Liga; Galanta; VII. Liga; Komárno; VII. Liga; Levice; VII. Liga; VIII. Liga; Nitra; VII. Liga; VIII. Liga A VIII. Liga B Nové Zámky; VII. Liga; VIII. Liga; Považská Bystrica; VII. Liga; VIII. Liga; Prievidza; VII. Liga; VIII. Liga A VIII. Liga B IX. Liga; Senica; VII. Liga; VIII. Liga; IX. Liga; Topoľčany; VII. Liga; VIII. Liga; Trenčín; VII. Liga; VIII. Liga North; VIII. Liga South; IX. Liga; Trnava; VII. Liga; VIII. Liga A VIII. Liga B IX. Liga	Sub-regional football unions Banská Bystrica; VII. Liga; VIII. Liga; Kysuce; VII. Liga; Dolný Kubín; VII. Liga; VIII. Liga; Liptov; VII. Liga; VIII. Liga; IX. Liga; Lučenec; VII. Liga; Martin (Turiec); I. trieda II. trieda Rimavská Sobota; VII. Liga; Veľký Krtíš; VII. Liga; Zvolen; I. trieda II. trieda Žiar nad Hronom; VII. Liga; VIII. Liga; Žilina; I. trieda II. trieda III. trieda	Sub-regional football unions Bardejov; VII. Liga; VIII. Liga; Humenné; VII. Liga; VIII. Liga; Košice-country; VII. Liga; VIII. Liga; Michalovce; VII. Liga; VIII. Liga; Podtatranský FZ; VII. Liga; VIII. Liga; Prešov; VII. Liga; VIII. Liga; IX. Liga; Rožňava; VII. Liga; Spišský OFZ; VII. Liga; Stará Ľubovňa; VII. Liga; Svidník (Ondava); VII. Liga; Trebišov; VII. Liga; Vranov nad Topľou; VII. Liga

== Slovak cup ==
The Slovak Cup is the football cup competition for Slovak club teams. It is organized annually by the Slovak Football Association (Slovenský futbalový zväz, SFZ). The cup has been held since the 1969/70 season, the first winner was Slovan Bratislava, who is also the record holder, with 17 titles.

== National team ==
The men's national team qualified as group winners for the 2010 World Cup in South Africa. At the final tournament, the Slovak team surprisingly won against the world champions Italy 3–2, the Slovaks also qualified for the knockout stages, where they were eliminated after a 2–1 defeat against the eventual finalists Netherlands.

The Slovak national team also qualified for UEFA Euro 2016, reaching the round of 16, and UEFA Euro 2020, where they were eliminated in the group stage.

== Attendances ==
The average attendance per top-flight football league season and the club with the highest average attendance:

Season	League average	Best club	Best club average
2024-25	2,512	Slovan	7,359
2023-24	2,611	Slovan	5,783
2022-23	2,333	DAC	6,017
2021-22	—	—	—
2020-21	—	—	—
2019-20	2,504	DAC	7,996
2018-19	2,400	DAC	8,445
2017-18	2,324	DAC	6,918
2016-17	1,973	DAC	4,112
2015-16	2,413	Trnava	6,934
2014-15	1,977	DAC	3,315
2013-14	2,194	DAC	3,012
2012-13	2,116	Trnava	4,142
2011-12	2,183	Trnava	5,051
2010-11	2,251	Trnava	4,123
2009-10	2,417	Trnava	4,403
2008-09	3,009	Slovan	5,547
2007-08	3,102	Trnava	7,218
2006-07	2,889	Zilina	5,231
2005-06	2,944	Trnava	9,219
2004-05	2,261	Petržalka	3,979
2003-04	3,167	Banská Bystrica	5,433
2002–03	3,358	Trnava	5,012
2001-02	3,456	Zilina	5,714
2000-01	3,588	Ružomberok	6,474
1999-2000	2,969	Ružomberok	4,892
1998-99	3,680	Trnava	8,649
1997-98	4,072	Trnava	11,557
1996-97	4,052	Trnava	14,670
1995-96	3,911	Trnava	12,304
1994-95	3,479	Trnava	6,795
1993–94	3,464	Slovan	7,543

== See also ==
- Sport in Slovakia
- List of football stadiums in Slovakia
