= FK Slovan Ivanka pri Dunaji =

Slovak football club

- Full name: FK Slovan Ivanka pri Dunaji
- Founded: 1919
- Ground: Štadión FK Slovan, Ivanka pri Dunaji
- Chairman: Dušan Paška
- Head coach: Lubomir Paraska
- League: 3. liga
- 2013–14: 9th

FK Slovan Ivanka pri Dunaji is a Slovak football team, based in the town of Ivanka pri Dunaji. The club was founded in 1919 by A. Vosátko. In year 2009 FK Slovan Ivanka pri Dunaji merged with club FO Trnávka.
