= FK Lokomotíva Devínska Nová Ves =

Slovak football club

Lokomotíva Devínska Nová Ves
- Full name: Futbalový klub Lokomotíva Devínska Nová Ves
- Nickname(s): FCL, Loky
- Founded: 1923 as ŠK Devínska Nová Ves
- Ground: Stadium "Za traťou"
- Capacity: 500
- Chairman: František Hupka
- Manager: Jozef Balog
- League: 4th League
- 2023-24: 5. Liga (Bratislava) 1st (Promoted)
- Website: http://www.lokomotivadnv.sk
Home colours	Away colours

FK Lokomotíva Devínska Nová Ves, also known as FCL DNV, is a Slovak football club based in Devínska Nová Ves, a borough of the capital Bratislava. It plays in the 3rd League.

== History ==
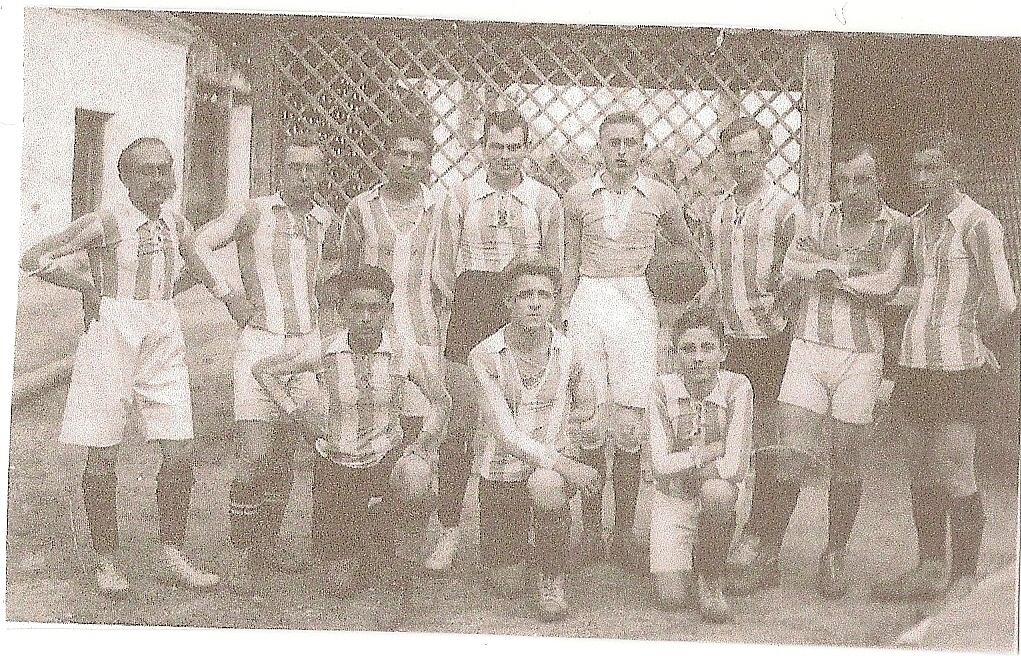
Team squad from the 1923 season.

Football club in Devínska Nová Ves was established in 1923 under the name ŠK Devínska Nová Ves. A few years later became the Devínska another club called Red Star. In 1927 changed its name to ŠK Slovan Devínska Nová Ves. In 1929 Red Star disappeared and ceased to operate and Slovan. In early 1930, however, a new club Slovan ŠK Devínska Nová Ves. The first football field in Devínska Nová Ves was in the area Grba. Later on, the ground moved for a new municipal People's School. The current stadium at the limestone street itself is built in 1964. In period of the Second World War the Devínska Nova Ves, Bratislava, and the best neighboring clubs. At that time, had its name from time to adapt to the Sports Section of Hlinka Guard Devínska Nová Ves. After the war began in 1945 footballers of Devínska Nová Ves in the West Division with a team of Nitra, Pezinok, Topoľčany, Nové Zámky, Hlohovec and Slovan Bratislava B. In the postwar years has Devínska Nová Ves very good young team. in the year 1946/47 has played the title Slovak champion. Only in the final group of western give adolescents Spartak Trnava. The successful performance in this period is greatly deserved Longtime chairman Jozef Schrek. Since 1949 the club name Sokol Devínska Nová Ves. With a performance of football to go down with water. The rise occurs again after the year 1953 (already TJ Lokomotíva Devínska Nová Ves).

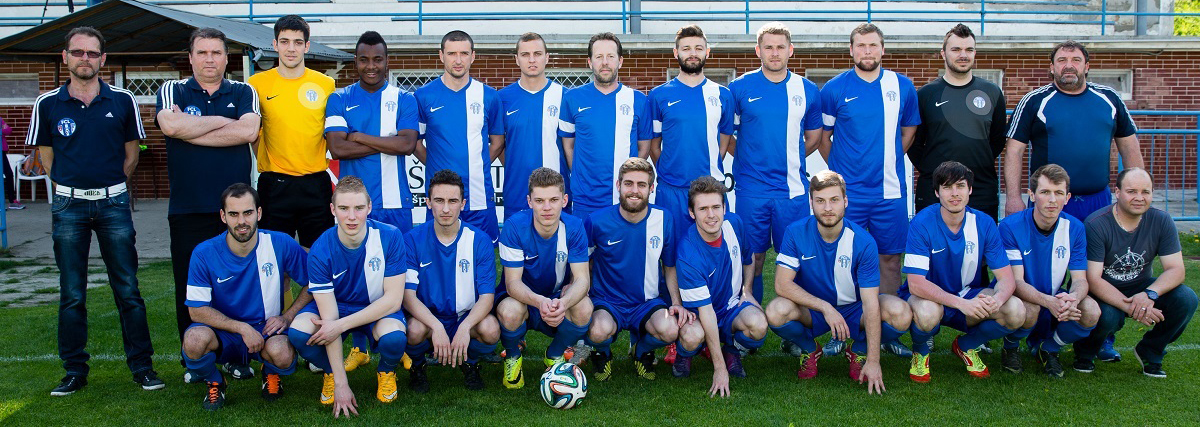
FK Lokomotíva from 2014/15.

In 1956 won Devínska Nová Ves in the southwestern county Championship. Young at the time to do young leagues. The popularity of football in Devínska Nová Ves demonstrates the fact, that in the year 1987/88 has played to 7 teams. Among the coaches to develop football in Devínska Nová Ves deserved Ján Baláž, Ladislav Horváth, Milan Moravec, Vojtech Skyva, Karol Borhy, Emil Pažický, Karol Jokl, Ján Turner, Miroslav Kucharič, Vladimír Hrivnák and others. In 1993 TJ Lokomotíva renamed FCL Devínska Nová Ves. Football Club is the most massive organization in Devínska Nová Ves. Among the most famous footballers of Devinska Nova Ves include Juraj Tóth, who played for ŠK Slovan Bratislava. In the season 1999/2000 occupied Lokomotíva 3rd place in the III. League, which is the best location in the history of the club. A few years later, the club fell to within 5th leagues. There are currently FCL DNV in 4th league. In 2009 attended three players from Devínska Nová Ves Walter Rischer, Juraj Šašík and Michal Polák European Amateurs Championships. Coach was Ľubomír Bohúň.

== Historical names ==
- ŠK Devínska Nova Ves
- ŠK Slovan Devínska Nová Ves
- ŠOHG Devínska Nová Ves
- Sokol Devínska Nová Ves
- TJ Lokomotíva Devínska Nová Ves
- FCL Devínska Nová Ves
- FK Lokomotíva Devínska Nová Ves

== Achievements ==
- 3rd Slovak League '
  - 5th place: 2000

== Current squad ==
Note: Flags indicate national team as defined under FIFA eligibility rules; some limited exceptions apply. Players may hold more than one non-FIFA nationality.

No.	Pos.	Nation	Player
7	MF	(Serbia) SRB	Kristijan Mitić
3	DF	(Slovakia) SVK	Erik Lépeš
4	MF	(Slovakia) SVK	Peter Sopúch
5	DF	(Slovakia) SVK	Juraj Šašík
8	MF	(Slovakia) SVK	Matej Hanúsek
9	DF	(Slovakia) SVK	Kamil Beňa
10	MF	(Slovakia) SVK	Samuel Lacko
11	FW	(Slovakia) SVK	Andrej Hrdlička (captain)

No.	Pos.	Nation	Player
16	DF	(Slovakia) SVK	Tomáš Polcer
18	FW	(England) ENG	Hasim Rashid Bakar
19	FW	(Slovakia) SVK	Lukáš Mihálik
23	DF	(Slovakia) SVK	Michal Bumbál
10	FW	(Bosnia and Herzegovina) BIH	Stojan Vasiljević

== Club officials ==
- Chairman: František Hupka
- Manager: Peter Zukal
- Director: Roland Vítko
- Coach: Jozef Balog
- Assist coach: Karol Schulz
- Assist coach: Ján Sabo
- Masseuse: Alexandra Megoová
