= TJ Družstevník Liptovská Štiavnica =

Slovak football club

Družstevník Liptovská Štiavnica
- Full name: Družstevník Liptovská Štiavnica
- Founded: 1932
- Ground: Štadión Liptovská Štiavnica, Liptovská Štiavnica
- League: 3. liga
- 2015–16: 9th

Družstevník Liptovská Štiavnica is a Slovak football team, based in the village of Liptovská Štiavnica. The club was founded in 1932.
