= 5. Liga =

5. liga
- Country: Slovakia
- Confederation: UEFA
- Leagues: 7
- Level on pyramid: 5
- Promotion to: 4. liga
- Relegation to: 6. liga
- Domestic cup: Slovak Cup

5. liga (5th league) is a shared name for all fifth-tier football leagues in Slovakia. The name currently belongs to 7 leagues, all are run by their respective regional football associations (FAs). The leagues' names also contain the abbreviation of the regional FA they are run by as well as a group (location) identifiers if needed.

== Divisions ==
=== Bratislava Football Association ===
- V. league BFZ (16 clubs)

=== West Slovak Football Association ===
- V. league Southeast HUMMEL ZsFZ (16 clubs)
- V. league Northwest HUMMEL ZsFZ (15 clubs)

=== Central Slovak Football Association ===
- V. league group South (14 clubs)
- V. league group North (14 clubs)

=== East Slovak Football Association ===
- V. league South dospelí VsFZ (14 clubs)
- V. league North dospelí VsFZ (14 clubs)
