= 2017–18 3. Liga (Slovakia) =

3. Liga
- Season: 2017–18
- Champions: FC Petržalka; Dubnica; MFK Dukla Banská Bystrica; Lipany
- Promoted: FC Petržalka; Dubnica; MFK Dukla Banská Bystrica; Lipany

The 2017–18 3. Liga was the 25th season of the third-tier football league of Slovakia since its establishment in 1993. The league is composed of 66 teams divided in four groups of 16 teams each; only 3. liga Západ (West) includes 18 teams. Teams are divided into four divisions: 3. liga Bratislava, 3. liga Západ (West), 3. liga Stred (Central), 3. liga Východ (Eastern), according to geographical separation.

== TIPOS III. liga Bratislava ==
=== Locations ===
2017–18 3. liga Greater Bratislava football clubs

=== League table ===
Pos	Team	Pld	W	D	L	GF	GA	GD	Pts	Promotion or relegation
1	Petržalka (C, P)	30	25	4	1	101	18	+83	79	Promotion to 2. Liga
2	Rohožník	30	24	2	4	103	18	+85	74	
3	Dunajská Lužná	30	22	3	5	78	24	+54	69	
4	Slovan Bratislava B	30	18	7	5	109	29	+80	61	
5	Rača Bratislava	30	18	3	9	59	32	+27	57	
6	Most pri Bratislave	30	17	6	7	58	34	+24	57	
7	Tomášov	30	12	5	13	46	62	−16	41	
8	Báhoň	30	11	4	15	50	55	−5	37	
9	Ivanka pri Dunaji	30	10	3	17	43	61	−18	33	
10	Bernolákovo	30	10	3	17	40	74	−34	33	
11	Rovinka	30	9	3	18	41	67	−26	30	
12	Devínska Nová Ves	30	8	5	17	40	53	−13	29	
13	Pezinok (Note: PŠC Pezinok was docked 3 points.)	30	7	8	15	33	50	−17	26	
14	Vajnory	30	6	8	16	39	111	−72	26	
15	Lozorno	30	6	5	19	34	75	−41	23	
16	Svätý Jur (R)	30	2	1	27	27	138	−111	7	Relegation to 4. liga

Source: III. liga Bratislava (S3BA)
Rules for classification: 1) points; 2) goal difference; 3) number of goals scored.
(C) Champions; (P) Promoted; (R) Relegated

=== Top goalscorers ===
As of 6 June 2018.

Rank	Player	Club	Goals
1	(Slovakia) Dávid Hrnčár	Slovan Bratislava B	38
2	(Slovakia) Tomáš Hrutka	FK Slovan Most pri Bratislave	22
3	(Slovakia) František Lády	FC Petržalka	21
4	(Slovakia) Boris Turčák	FC Petržalka	19
5	(Slovakia) Marek Horváth	FC Rohožník	17
6	(Ukraine) Illia Tereshchenko	Slovan Bratislava B	13
7	(Slovakia) Juraj Gecler	ŠK Lozorno	12
8	(Slovakia) Ivan Lietava	ŠK Báhoň	11
8	(Slovakia) Patrik Brieška	ŠK Tomášov	11
8	(Slovakia) Dávid Kondrlík	FC Petržalka	11
8	(Slovakia) Martin Kubala	FK Rača	11
8	(Slovakia) Dominik Golian	FK Rača	11

== TIPOS III. liga Západ ==
=== Locations ===
Location of teams in the 2017–18 3. Liga Západ (West)

=== League table ===
Pos	Team	Pld	W	D	L	GF	GA	GD	Pts	Promotion or relegation
1	Dubnica (C, P)	34	27	5	2	83	10	+73	86	Promotion to 2. Liga
2	Borčice	34	22	5	7	78	35	+43	71	
3	Nové Zámky	34	22	5	7	58	31	+27	71	
4	Lednické Rovne	34	21	3	10	61	33	+28	66	
5	Galanta	34	15	8	11	58	42	+16	53	
6	Dunajská Streda B	34	15	7	12	51	38	+13	52	
7	Zlaté Moravce - Vráble B	34	14	10	10	60	53	+7	52	
8	Spartak Trnava B	34	16	2	16	59	46	+13	50	
9	Púchov	34	14	6	14	68	49	+19	48	
10	FC Nitra B	34	14	6	14	57	47	+10	48	
11	Veľké Ludince	34	14	5	15	50	57	−7	47	
12	Gabčíkovo	34	13	7	14	55	47	+8	46	
13	Šaľa	34	14	3	17	49	65	−16	45	
14	Nemšová	34	13	3	18	46	59	−13	42	
15	Beluša	34	10	8	16	50	62	−12	38	
16	Prievidza (R)	34	7	4	23	36	75	−39	25	Relegation to 4. liga
17	Bánovce nad Bebravou (R)	34	5	5	24	23	90	−67	20	Relegation to 4. liga
18	Topoľčany (R)	34	4	0	30	25	128	−103	12	Relegation to 4. liga

Source: TIPOS III. liga ZsFZ
Rules for classification: 1) points; 2) goal difference; 3) number of goals scored.
(C) Champions; (P) Promoted; (R) Relegated

=== Top goalscorers ===
As of 17 June 2018.

Rank	Player	Club	Goals
1	(Slovakia) Marek Gajdošík	MŠK Púchov	27
2	(Slovakia) Matej Gorelka	TJ KOVO Beluša	21
3	(Slovakia) Lukáš Slávik	TJ Iskra Borčice	17
4	(Slovakia) Róbert Demjan	TJ Iskra Borčice	15
4	(Democratic Republic of the Congo) Patrick Kingambo	FKM Nové Zámky	15
6	(Brazil) Renan Oliveira	FC ViOn Zlaté Moravce - Vráble B	14
6	(Slovakia) Stanislav Detko	ŠK LR Crystal Lednické Rovne	14
6	(Nigeria) Kingsley Iheme	FK Slovan Nemšová/ FK Slovan Duslo Šaľa	14
9	(Slovakia) Ján Vaško	FK Dubnica	13
9	(Slovakia) Ladislav Tóth	ŠK 1923 Gabčíkovo	13
11	(Montenegro) Miladin Vujošević	FK Dubnica	12
11	(Slovakia) Matej Jakúbek	FK Dubnica	12
11	(Slovakia) Šimon Herceg	FK Slovan Duslo Šaľa/ FC Slovan Galanta	12

== III. liga Stred ==
=== Locations ===
Location of teams in the 2017–18 3. Liga Stred (Central)

=== League table ===
Pos	Team	Pld	W	D	L	GF	GA	GD	Pts	Promotion or relegation
1	Banská Bystrica (C, P)	30	21	6	3	60	18	+42	69	Promotion to 2. Liga
2	Rimavská Sobota	30	18	4	8	84	41	+43	58	
3	Liptovský Hrádok	30	16	5	9	61	44	+17	53	
4	Kalinovo	30	17	1	12	47	36	+11	52	
5	Lučenec	30	16	3	11	50	37	+13	51	
6	Námestovo	30	13	9	8	51	33	+18	48	
7	Žarnovica	30	13	5	12	38	47	−9	44	
8	Liptovská Štiavnica	30	13	5	12	34	45	−11	44	
9	Oravské Veselé	30	13	4	13	36	33	+3	43	
10	Martin	30	11	8	11	53	42	+11	41	
11	Čadca	30	11	5	14	47	49	−2	38	
12	Fiľakovo	30	12	2	16	36	56	−20	38	
13	Krásno nad Kysucou	30	10	5	15	41	50	−9	35	
14	Teplička nad Váhom (R)	30	8	7	15	40	52	−12	31	Relegation to 4. liga
15	Nová Baňa (R)	30	6	4	20	35	73	−38	22	Relegation to 4. liga
16	Detva (R)	30	4	3	23	31	88	−57	15	Relegation to 4. liga

Source: III.liga SsFZ
Rules for classification: 1) points; 2) goal difference; 3) number of goals scored.
(C) Champions; (P) Promoted; (R) Relegated

=== Top goalscorers ===
As of 16 June 2018.

Rank	Player	Club	Goals
1	(Slovakia) Lukáš Stanislav	ŠKM Liptovský Hrádok	25
2	(Montenegro) Miladin Vujoševič	MŠK Rimavská Sobota	23
3	(Serbia) Milan Vajagić	MŠK Fomat Martin	21
4	(Slovakia) Lukáš Laksík	MFK Dukla Banská Bystrica	17
4	(Serbia) Stefan Visić	ŠK Novohrad Lučenec	17
6	(Slovakia) Slavomír Kapusniak	OFK Teplička nad Váhom	16
7	(Serbia) Dušan Milanović	MFK Nová Baňa	13
7	(Slovakia) Erik Ľupták	MŠK Rimavská Sobota	13
9	(Serbia) Milan Milošević	MFK Nová Baňa	12
9	(Slovakia) Gergö Kelemen	ŠK Novohrad Lučenec	12
9	(Slovakia) Marek Žákovič	MŠK Námestovo	12
9	(Slovakia) Ivan Šebík	FK Čadca	12

== III. liga Východ ==
=== Locations ===
Location of teams in the 2017–18 3. Liga Východ (East)

=== League table ===
Pos	Team	Pld	W	D	L	GF	GA	GD	Pts	Promotion or relegation
1	Lipany (C, P)	30	21	4	5	60	16	+44	67	Promotion to 2. Liga
2	Vranov nad Topľou	30	19	6	5	70	27	+43	63	
3	FK Košice	30	19	6	5	69	24	+45	63	
4	Snina	30	17	6	7	66	35	+31	57	
5	Stropkov	30	16	6	8	44	29	+15	54	
6	Svidník	30	13	7	10	43	34	+9	46	
7	Šarišské Michaľany	30	13	7	10	41	31	+10	46	
8	Rožňava	30	13	5	12	44	41	+3	44	
9	Krompachy	30	13	2	15	48	54	−6	41	
10	Plavnica	30	11	8	11	41	44	−3	41	
11	Veľké Revištia	30	10	5	15	30	49	−19	35	
12	Tatran Prešov B	30	9	5	16	60	57	+3	32	
13	Bardejovská Nová Ves	30	9	3	18	32	58	−26	30	
14	Giraltovce	30	7	4	19	23	57	−34	25	
15	Svit (R)	30	6	3	21	22	78	−56	21	Relegation to 4. liga
16	Sabinov (R)	30	2	7	21	26	85	−59	13	Relegation to 4. liga

Source: III.LIGA VÝCHOD DOSPELÍ VSFZ
Rules for classification: 1) points; 2) goal difference; 3) number of goals scored.
(C) Champions; (P) Promoted; (R) Relegated

=== Top goalscorers ===
As of 16 June 2018.

Rank	Player	Club	Goals
1	(Ukraine) Oleh Vyshnevskyi	MFK Snina	32
2	(Slovakia) Radovan Bandžuch	FK Košice	18
3	(Slovakia) Mojmír Trebuňák	FK Košice/ Tatran Prešov II	14
4	(Slovakia) Jozef Skvašík	MFK Snina	13
4	(Slovakia) Oliver Špilár	MŠK Tesla Stropkov	13
4	(Slovakia) Pavol Cicman	OŠFK Šarišské Michaľany/ 1.FK Svidník	13
7	(Slovakia) Matúš Digoň	MFK Vranov nad Topľou	12
8	(Slovakia) Marcel Vysočan	ŠK Odeva Lipany	11
9	(Slovakia) Lukáš Janič	ŠK Odeva Lipany	10
9	(Slovakia) Jaroslav Figúr	MFK Rožňava	10
9	(Slovakia) Kristián Tináth	FK Družstevník Plavnica	10
