= 2016–17 3. Liga (Slovakia) =

3. Liga
- Season: 2016–17
- Promoted: Inter Bratislava; Komárno; Podbrezová B Trebišov

The 2016–17 3. Liga (Slovakia) was the 24th edition of the third tier 3. Liga (Slovakia) since its establishment in 1993. 67 teams contested being divided in four geographic groups of 16 teams each: 3. liga Bratislava, 3. liga Západ (West), 3. liga Stred (Central), 3. liga Východ (East); except for 3. liga Západ (West) which included 19 teams.

== TIPOS III. liga Bratislava ==
=== Locations ===
2016–17 3. liga Greater Bratislava football clubs

=== League table ===
| Pos | Team | Pld | W | D | L | GF | GA | GD | Pts | Promotion or relegation |
|---|---|---|---|---|---|---|---|---|---|---|
| 1 | Inter Bratislava (C, P) | 30 | 24 | 4 | 2 | 93 | 11 | +82 | 76 | Promotion to 2. Liga |
| 2 | Rohožník | 30 | 24 | 3 | 3 | 102 | 23 | +79 | 75 | |
| 3 | Tomášov | 30 | 18 | 4 | 8 | 78 | 48 | +30 | 58 | |
| 4 | Dunajská Lužná | 30 | 15 | 6 | 9 | 67 | 42 | +25 | 51 | |
| 5 | Vajnory | 30 | 15 | 4 | 11 | 57 | 41 | +16 | 49 | |
| 6 | Ivanka pri Dunaji | 30 | 15 | 2 | 13 | 51 | 55 | −4 | 47 | |
| 7 | Devínska Nová Ves | 30 | 13 | 5 | 12 | 73 | 51 | +22 | 44 | |
| 8 | Rača Bratislava | 30 | 12 | 4 | 14 | 51 | 41 | +10 | 40 | |
| 9 | Rovinka | 30 | 11 | 6 | 13 | 53 | 59 | −6 | 39 | |
| 10 | Báhoň | 30 | 11 | 3 | 16 | 45 | 56 | −11 | 36 | |
| 11 | Most pri Bratislave | 30 | 9 | 7 | 14 | 37 | 50 | −13 | 34 | |
| 12 | Lozorno | 30 | 10 | 4 | 16 | 41 | 59 | −18 | 34 | |
| 13 | Pezinok | 30 | 9 | 7 | 14 | 35 | 65 | −30 | 34 | |
| 14 | Bernolákovo | 30 | 9 | 6 | 15 | 39 | 67 | −28 | 33 | |
| 15 | Malacky (R) | 30 | 9 | 6 | 15 | 51 | 66 | −15 | 33 | Relegation to 4. liga |
| 16 | Kráľová pri Senci (R) | 30 | 0 | 1 | 29 | 19 | 158 | −139 | 1 | Relegation to 4. liga |

Source: TIPOS III. LIGA BRATISLAVA
Rules for classification: 1) points; 2) goal difference; 3) number of goals scored.
(C) Champions; (P) Promoted; (R) Relegated

=== Top goalscorers ===
As of 10 June 2017.

| Rank | Player | Club | Goals |
|---|---|---|---|
| 1 | (Slovakia) Ján Kadera | FC Rohožník | 29 |
| 2 | (Serbia) Milan Milošević | ŠK Tomášov | 25 |
| 3 | (Slovakia) Jakub Šulc | Inter Bratislava | 23 |
| 4 | (Slovakia) Róbert Vaniš | FC Rohožník | 20 |
| 5 | (Serbia) Dušan Milanović | ŠK Tomášov | 19 |
| 5 | (Slovakia) Rastislav Havlík | FC Malacky | 19 |

== TIPOS III. liga Západ ==
=== Locations ===
Location of teams in the 2016–17 3. Liga Západ (West)

=== League table ===
| Pos | Team | Pld | W | D | L | GF | GA | GD | Pts | Promotion or relegation |
|---|---|---|---|---|---|---|---|---|---|---|
| 1 | Komárno (C, P) | 36 | 23 | 9 | 4 | 83 | 32 | +51 | 78 | Promotion to 2. Liga |
| 2 | Lednické Rovne | 36 | 21 | 8 | 7 | 68 | 34 | +34 | 71 | |
| 3 | Púchov | 36 | 20 | 10 | 6 | 61 | 28 | +33 | 70 | |
| 4 | Dunajská Streda B | 36 | 16 | 9 | 11 | 56 | 37 | +19 | 57 | |
| 5 | Zlaté Moravce - Vráble B | 36 | 15 | 10 | 11 | 53 | 44 | +9 | 55 | |
| 6 | Dubnica | 36 | 16 | 7 | 13 | 49 | 43 | +6 | 55 | |
| 7 | Beluša | 36 | 15 | 8 | 13 | 47 | 52 | −5 | 53 | |
| 8 | Galanta | 36 | 15 | 7 | 14 | 58 | 49 | +9 | 52 | |
| 9 | Nemšová | 36 | 15 | 6 | 15 | 54 | 53 | +1 | 51 | |
| 10 | Veľké Ludince | 36 | 14 | 9 | 13 | 50 | 51 | −1 | 51 | |
| 11 | Horses | 36 | 15 | 4 | 17 | 54 | 63 | −9 | 49 | |
| 12 | Gabčíkovo | 36 | 13 | 8 | 15 | 40 | 47 | −7 | 47 | |
| 13 | Topoľčany | 36 | 14 | 3 | 19 | 41 | 53 | −12 | 45 | |
| 14 | Nové Zámky | 36 | 12 | 8 | 16 | 52 | 50 | +2 | 44 | |
| 15 | Horná Nitra | 36 | 12 | 6 | 18 | 46 | 62 | −16 | 42 | |
| 16 | Šaľa | 36 | 11 | 8 | 17 | 36 | 43 | −7 | 41 | |
| 17 | Šurany (R) | 36 | 11 | 6 | 19 | 55 | 79 | −24 | 39 | Relegation to 4. liga |
| 18 | Veľký Meder (R) | 36 | 9 | 6 | 21 | 40 | 76 | −36 | 33 | Relegation to 4. liga |
| 19 | Neded (R) | 36 | 6 | 6 | 24 | 38 | 85 | −47 | 24 | Relegation to 4. liga |

Source: TIPOS III. LIGA ZSFZ
Rules for classification: 1) points; 2) goal difference; 3) number of goals scored.
(C) Champions; (P) Promoted; (R) Relegated

=== Top goalscorers ===
As of 18 June 2017.

| Rank | Player | Club | Goals |
|---|---|---|---|
| 1 | (Czech Republic) Roman Haša | KFC Komárno | 24 |
| 2 | (Armenia) Vahagn Militosyan | KFC Komárno/MFK Topvar Topoľčany | 20 |
| 3 | (Slovakia) Stanislav Detko | ŠK LR Crystal Lednické Rovne | 18 |
| 4 | (Slovakia) Peter Lipták | ŠK LR Crystal Lednické Rovne | 17 |
| 5 | (Slovakia) Matej Gorelka | TJ KOVO Beluša | 16 |
| 5 | (Slovakia) Marek Gajdošík | MŠK Púchov | 16 |
| 7 | (Slovakia) Tomáš Faragó | KFC Komárno | 15 |

== TIPOS III. liga Stred ==
=== Locations ===
Location of teams in the 2016–17 3. Liga Stred (Central)

=== League table ===
| Pos | Team | Pld | W | D | L | GF | GA | GD | Pts | Promotion or relegation |
|---|---|---|---|---|---|---|---|---|---|---|
| 1 | Liptovský Hrádok (C) | 28 | 24 | 2 | 2 | 87 | 17 | +70 | 74 | Promotion to 2. Liga |
| 2 | Podbrezová B (P) | 28 | 15 | 4 | 9 | 60 | 45 | +15 | 49 | |
| 3 | Kremnička | 28 | 15 | 4 | 9 | 47 | 28 | +19 | 49 | |
| 4 | Kalinovo | 28 | 14 | 5 | 9 | 46 | 36 | +10 | 47 | |
| 5 | Žarnovica | 28 | 14 | 5 | 9 | 52 | 43 | +9 | 47 | |
| 6 | Námestovo | 28 | 14 | 4 | 10 | 42 | 29 | +13 | 46 | |
| 7 | Lučenec | 28 | 12 | 6 | 10 | 43 | 46 | −3 | 42 | |
| 8 | Teplička nad Váhom | 28 | 11 | 4 | 13 | 48 | 47 | +1 | 37 | |
| 9 | Čadca | 28 | 12 | 1 | 15 | 40 | 50 | −10 | 37 | |
| 10 | Krásno nad Kysucou | 28 | 11 | 2 | 15 | 39 | 40 | −1 | 35 | |
| 11 | Fiľakovo | 28 | 9 | 5 | 14 | 39 | 49 | −10 | 32 | |
| 12 | Liptovská Štiavnica | 28 | 9 | 5 | 14 | 43 | 61 | −18 | 32 | |
| 13 | Nová Baňa | 28 | 8 | 6 | 14 | 35 | 59 | −24 | 30 | |
| 14 | Detva | 28 | 4 | 9 | 15 | 35 | 71 | −36 | 21 | |
| 15 | Makov (R) | 28 | 6 | 2 | 20 | 35 | 70 | −35 | 20 | Relegation to 4. liga |
| 16 | Stráža (R) | 0 | 0 | 0 | 0 | 0 | 0 | 0 | 0 | Withdrew from the league (Note: TJ Stráža withdrew from the league before starting second-half of the season due to departure of the main club sponsor.) |

Source: TIPOS III.LIGA SKUPINA STRED
Rules for classification: 1) points; 2) goal difference; 3) number of goals scored.
(C) Champions; (P) Promoted; (R) Relegated

=== Top goalscorers ===
As of 18 June 2017.

| Rank | Player | Club | Goals |
|---|---|---|---|
| 1 | (Slovakia) Matúš Otruba | ŠKM Liptovský Hrádok | 25 |
| 2 | (Slovakia) Lukáš Laksík | ŠK Kremnička | 19 |
| 3 | (Slovakia) Pavol Orolín | ŠKM Liptovský Hrádok | 17 |
| 4 | (Slovakia) Branislav Macura | TJ Tatran Krásno nad Kysucou | 13 |
| 5 | (Slovakia) Lukáš Migaľa | FK Železiarne Podbrezová B | 11 |
| 5 | (Montenegro) Miladin Vujošević | FTC Fiľakovo | 11 |
| 5 | (Slovakia) Slavomír Kapusniak | OFK Teplička nad Váhom | 11 |
| 5 | (Slovakia) Erik Hric | FK Železiarne Podbrezová B | 11 |
| 5 | (Slovakia) Lukáš Štefanka | MFK Žarnovica | 11 |
| 5 | (Serbia) Vladimir Pešić | TJ Baník Kalinovo | 11 |

== TIPOS III. liga Východ ==
=== Locations ===
Location of teams in the 2016–17 3. Liga Východ (East)

=== League table ===
| Pos | Team | Pld | W | D | L | GF | GA | GD | Pts | Promotion or relegation |
|---|---|---|---|---|---|---|---|---|---|---|
| 1 | Trebišov (C, P) | 26 | 20 | 2 | 4 | 63 | 11 | +52 | 62 | Promotion to 2. Liga |
| 2 | Vyšné Opátske | 26 | 17 | 7 | 2 | 63 | 21 | +42 | 58 | |
| 3 | Snina | 26 | 11 | 9 | 6 | 50 | 27 | +23 | 42 | |
| 4 | Svit | 26 | 12 | 6 | 8 | 53 | 35 | +18 | 42 | |
| 5 | Svidník | 26 | 13 | 3 | 10 | 44 | 36 | +8 | 42 | |
| 6 | Vranov nad Topľou | 26 | 12 | 5 | 9 | 34 | 28 | +6 | 41 | |
| 7 | Plavnica | 26 | 11 | 4 | 11 | 42 | 41 | +1 | 37 | |
| 8 | Giraltovce | 26 | 10 | 6 | 10 | 40 | 30 | +10 | 36 | |
| 9 | Sabinov | 26 | 8 | 8 | 10 | 40 | 41 | −1 | 32 | |
| 10 | Bardejovská Nová Ves | 26 | 9 | 5 | 12 | 40 | 53 | −13 | 32 | |
| 11 | Veľké Revištia | 26 | 8 | 5 | 13 | 34 | 41 | −7 | 29 | |
| 12 | Stropkov | 26 | 7 | 7 | 12 | 36 | 40 | −4 | 28 | |
| 13 | Tatran Prešov B | 26 | 6 | 6 | 14 | 37 | 46 | −9 | 24 | |
| 14 | Pušovce (R) | 26 | 1 | 1 | 24 | 7 | 133 | −126 | 4 | Relegation to 4. liga |
| 15 | Veľký Horeš (R) | 0 | 0 | 0 | 0 | 0 | 0 | 0 | 0 | Withdrew from the league (Note: Družstevník Veľký Horeš withdrew from the league before starting second-half of the season and FK Košice – Krásna before the season 2016–17.) |
| 16 | Košice – Krásna (R) | 0 | 0 | 0 | 0 | 0 | 0 | 0 | 0 | Withdrew from the league |

Source: III.LIGA VÝCHOD DOSPELÍ VSFZ
Rules for classification: 1) points; 2) goal difference; 3) number of goals scored.
(C) Champions; (P) Promoted; (R) Relegated

=== Top goalscorers ===
As of 18 June 2017.

| Rank | Player | Club | Goals |
|---|---|---|---|
| 1 | (Slovakia) Lukáš Stanislav | FK Svit | 26 |
| 1 | (Slovakia) Matúš Lorinčák | FK Slavoj Trebišov | 26 |
| 3 | (Slovakia) Radovan Bandžuch | TJ FK Vyšné Opátske | 25 |
| 4 | (Ukraine) Oleh Vyshnevskyi | MFK Snina | 20 |
| 5 | (Slovakia) Jozef Skvašík | MFK Snina | 14 |
| 6 | (Slovakia) Erik Burcák | MŠK Tesla Stropkov | 12 |
| 6 | (Slovakia) Matúš Digoň | MFK Slovan Giraltovce | 12 |
| 6 | (Slovakia) Tomáš Kiseľ | ŠK Milénium Bardejovská Nová Ves | 12 |
