= 2019–20 2. Liga (Slovakia) =

2. Liga
- Season: 2019–20
- Promoted: None
- Relegated: MFK Ružomberok B (withdrew)
- Top goalscorer: Roman Haša (14)

The 2019–20 2. Liga (Slovakia) was the 27th edition of the second tier 2. Liga annual football tournament, since its establishment in 1993.

== Teams ==
=== Team changes ===
Promoted from 2018–19 3. Liga	Relegated from 2018–19 Slovak First Football League	Promoted to 2019–20 Slovak First Football League	Relegated to 2019–20 3. Liga (Slovakia)	Relegated to 2019–20 5. Liga (Slovakia)
ŠK Slovan Bratislava B MŠK Púchov; MFK Ružomberok B FC Košice	FK Železiarne Podbrezová	FK Pohronie	FK Inter Bratislava; 1. FC Tatran Prešov; ŠK Odeva Lipany	FC Lokomotíva Košice

=== Stadiums and locations ===
Location of teams in Slovak 2. liga 2019–20

Team	Location	Stadium	Capacity
Železiarne Podbrezová	Podbrezová	ZELPO Aréna	4,061
MFK Skalica	Skalica	Mestský štadión Skalica	3,000
FK Dubnica	Dubnica nad Váhom	Mestský futbalový štadión	5,450
MFK Dukla Banská Bystrica	Banská Bystrica	SNP Stadium	9,881
FC Petržalka	Petržalka	Štadión Sklodowská	1,600
FK Poprad	Poprad	NTC Poprad	5,070
MŠK Žilina B	Žilina	Štadión pod Dubňom	11,258
KFC Komárno	Komárno	Mestský štadión Komárno	1,250
FC ŠTK 1914 Šamorín	Šamorín	Pomlé Stadium	1,950
MFK Tatran Liptovský Mikuláš	Liptovský Mikuláš	Stadium Liptovský Mikuláš	1,950
Partizán Bardejov	Bardejov	Mestský štadión Bardejov	3,040
FK Slavoj Trebišov	Trebišov	Štadión Slavoj Trebišov	2,000
Slovan Bratislava juniori	Bratislava	Štadión Pasienky	11,401
MŠK Púchov	Púchov	Mestský štadión Púchov	6,614
MFK Ružomberok II	Ružomberok	Štadión pod Čebraťom	4,876
FC Košice	Košice	Štadión Lokomotívy	9,000

=== Personnel and kits ===
Note: Flags indicate national team as has been defined under FIFA eligibility rules. Players and Managers may hold more than one non-FIFA nationality.

Team	Head coach	Captain	Kit manufacturer	Shirt sponsor
MFK Skalica	(Slovakia) Jozef Kostelník	(Slovakia) Lukáš Opiela	(United States) Nike	TBA
FK Slavoj Trebišov	(Slovakia) Vladimír Rusnák	(Slovakia) Ľubomír Korijkov	(Germany) Adidas	Armstav
FK Poprad	(Slovakia) Jaroslav Belejčák	(Slovakia) Štefan Zošák	(Germany) Adidas	Ritro
MŠK Žilina B	(Slovakia) Peter Černák	(Slovakia) Peter Chríbik	(United States) Nike	Preto
KFC Komárno	(Slovakia) Miroslav Karhan	(Slovakia) Patrik Pinte	(Germany) Adidas	MOL
FC ŠTK 1914 Šamorín	(Slovakia) Ján Blaháč	(Slovakia) Vladimír Pončák	(Italy) Kappa	
MFK Tatran Liptovský Mikuláš	(Slovakia) Štefan Zaťko	(Slovakia) Dušan Kucharčík	(Italy) Sportika SA	Verex
Partizán Bardejov	(Slovakia) Branislav Benko	(Slovakia) Jakub Bartek	(Germany) Adidas	Bardenergy, Setl SK
FC Petržalka	(Slovakia) Vladimír Koník	(Slovakia) Juraj Piroska	(Italy) Erreà	-
FK Dubnica	(Slovakia) Peter Gergely	(Slovakia) Dalibor Pleva	(Spain) Joma	-
MFK Dukla Banská Bystrica	(Slovakia) Stanislav Varga	(Serbia) Saša Savić	(Germany) Adidas	Fajne
ŠK Slovan Bratislava juniori	(Slovakia) Szilárd Németh	(Slovakia) Martin Hubert	(Germany) Adidas	grafobal
MŠK Púchov	(Slovakia) Vladimír Cifranič	(Slovakia) František Brezničan	(Germany) Jako	-
MFK Ružomberok B	(Slovakia) Ladislav Pecko	(Slovakia) Mário Mrva	(Germany) Adidas	MAESTRO
FC Košice	(Slovakia) Marek Fabuľa	(Slovakia) František Vancák	(Germany) Adidas	BMW Regnum Košice
Podbrezová	(Slovakia) Jozef Mores	(Czech Republic) Jakub Hric	(Germany) Adidas	Železiarne Podbrezová

== League table ==
Pos	Team	Pld	W	D	L	GF	GA	GD	Pts	Qualification or relegation
1	MFK Dukla Banská Bystrica	18	13	2	3	41	20	+21	41	Qualification for Promotion Group
2	FK Dubnica nad Váhom	18	12	2	4	39	24	+15	38	Qualification for Promotion Group
3	MFK Skalica	18	11	2	5	33	19	+14	35	Qualification for Promotion Group
4	FK Poprad	17	10	1	6	26	16	+10	31	Qualification for Promotion Group
5	MŠK Žilina B	18	10	1	7	38	29	+9	31	Qualification for Promotion Group
6	FK Železiarne Podbrezová	18	9	1	8	26	26	0	28	Qualification for Promotion Group
7	MFK Tatran Liptovský Mikuláš	18	8	2	8	28	30	−2	26	
8	MŠK Púchov	18	7	3	8	22	24	−2	24	
9	MFK Ružomberok B	18	7	1	10	23	36	−13	22	Withdrew from the league (Note: Ružomberok B withdrew from the league due to COVID-19 financial problems.)
10	FC Košice	17	5	6	6	22	18	+4	21	
11	Partizán Bardejov BŠK	18	6	3	9	19	23	−4	21	
12	FC ŠTK 1914 Šamorín	18	6	3	9	24	31	−7	21	
13	KFC Komárno	18	5	5	8	19	28	−9	20	
14	FC Petržalka	18	5	2	11	24	34	−10	17	
15	ŠK Slovan Bratislava B	18	5	2	11	16	31	−15	17	
16	SLAVOJ Trebišov	18	3	6	9	23	34	−11	15	

Source: Flashscore
Rules for classification: 1) Points; 2) Head-to-head points; 3) Head-to-head goal difference; 4) Head-to-head away goals scored; 5) Play-off.

== Results ==
Home \ Away	DBB	KOŠ	KOM	PAR	PET	POD	POP	PÚC	RUB	SKA	STV	SLB	LMI	DUB	SAM	ZAB
Dukla Banská Bystrica		3–1					2–0		3–2	4–0		3–0	2–1	3–3	5–0	3–4
Košice				1–2		1–1		0–0	5–0		2–2	3–0			1–1	1–0
Komárno	1–3	0–0		1–0	0–0	1–0		2–2	4–0	1–1					2–0	
Partizán Bardejov	0–0				1–2		1–0		2–0		1–1	2–0	1–3	3–0		1–2
Petržalka	0–2	1–2		0–1			1–3		1–3		5–3	3–0	4–3			3–1
Podbrezová	0–2	2–1	2–1		2–0		0–3	5–2		1–0	3–0		4–0		1–0	
Poprad		3–2	2–0			1–2			2–0	1–2	2–0	1–0		3–2		0–1
Púchov	1–2		1–0	3–0	1–1		2–1			1–0			1–2		5–3	
Ružomberok B	0–1		4–1			2–0		2–0		0–3	2–1		2–5	2–4		1–4
Skalica	3–1	1–0		3–0	2–0	3–1		1–0				3–1	1–1		3–0	
Slavoj Trebišov		1–1	3–1	2–1	4–0			0–1		1–4				1–1	0–0	
Slovan Bratislava B			0–1			2–0	1–1	2–0	0–0	4–0	2–1		2–1	0–2		2–5
Tatran Liptovský Mikuláš		1–0	4–1				0–2	1–0	0–2		1–1	2–0		1–3		2–1
Dubnica		0–1	4–1	1–0	3–2	3–1		1–0		2–1					4–1	1–0
Šamorín	3–0		3–1	2–2	2–1		0–1		0–1			3–0	3–0	2–1		
Žilina B	1–2		1–1		1–0	4–1		1–2		4–2	3–2			2–4	3–1	

Source: Futbalnet (in Slovak)
Legend: Blue = home team win; Yellow = draw; Red = away team win.

== Promotion group ==
Pos	Team	Pld	W	D	L	GF	GA	GD	Pts	Qualification	DUB	DBB	SKA	POD	ZAB	POP
1	FK Dubnica nad Váhom	20	14	4	2	45	22	+23	46	Qualification for Promotion play-offs	—	4–1	—	—	—	2–1
2	MFK Dukla Banská Bystrica	20	14	3	3	52	23	+29	45		—	—	2–0	2–2	—	—
3	MFK Skalica	20	12	3	5	32	19	+13	39		0–0	—	—	—	1–0	1–0
4	FK Železiarne Podbrezová	20	10	2	8	31	28	+3	32		—	1–1	—	—	3–0	—
5	MŠK Žilina B	20	10	1	9	41	33	+8	31		—	—	—	—	—	4–0
6	FK Poprad	20	10	0	10	26	29	−3	30		—	0–7	—	—	—	—

Source: Flashscore
Rules for classification: 1) Points; 2) Head-to-head points; 3) Head-to-head goal difference; 4) Head-to-head away goals scored; 5) Play-off.

== Season statistics ==
=== Top goalscorers ===
As of 11 July 2020

Rank	Player	Club	Goals
1	(Czech Republic) Roman Haša	Skalica	14
2	(Slovakia) Róbert Polievka	Banská Bystrica	12
3	(Slovakia) Ladislav Almási	Petržalka	11
4	(Poland) Dawid Kurminowski	Žilina B	9
5	(Slovakia) Martin Rymarenko	Šamorín	8
5	(Slovakia) Patrik Prikryl	Banská Bystrica	8
7	(Slovakia) Marek Kuzma	Dubnica	7
7	(Slovakia) Maroš Čurik	Dubnica	7
7	(Montenegro) Miladin Vujošević	Dubnica(6)/B.Bystrica(1)	7
7	(Slovakia) Daniel Šebesta	Skalica	7
7	(Slovakia) Matej Starší	Banská Bystrica	7
7	(Slovakia) Lukáš Laksík	Banská Bystrica	7
13	(Slovakia) Michal Horodník	Bardejov	5
13	(Slovakia) Martin Pribula	Podbrezová	5
13	(Slovakia) Ľuboslav Laura	Liptovský Mikuláš	5
13	(Serbia) Dragan Andrić	Poprad	5
