= 2022–23 2. Liga (Slovakia) =

2. Liga
- Season: 2022–23
- Dates: 16 July 2022 – May 2023
- Champions: FC Košice
- Promoted: FC Košice
- Relegated: FK Rača; FK Dubnica
- Matches: 136
- Goals: 369 (2.71 per match)
- Top goalscorer: Jozef Dolný (19)

The 2022–23 2. Liga was the 30th season of the 2. Liga in Slovakia, since its establishment in 1993.

== Teams ==
=== Team changes ===
Promoted from 2021–22 3. Liga	Relegated from 2021–22 Fortuna liga	Promoted to 2022–23 Fortuna liga	Relegated to 2022–23 3. Liga
Rača; Považská Bystrica; Dolný Kubín; Tatran Prešov; Myjava	Pohronie	Podbrezová; Dukla Banská Bystrica; Skalica	Rohožník; Bardejov; Námestovo

=== Stadiums and locations ===
Location of teams in Slovak 2. liga 2022–23

Team	Location	Stadium	Capacity
FC Košice	Košice	Košická futbalová aréna	5,836
FC ŠTK 1914 Šamorín	Šamorín	Pomlé Stadium	1,950
MŠK Púchov	Púchov	Mestský štadión Púchov	6,614
KFC Komárno	Komárno	Mestský štadión Komárno	1,250
FC Petržalka	Bratislava	Štadión FC Petržalka	1,600
FK Slavoj Trebišov	Trebišov	Štadión Slavoj Trebišov	2,000
FK Dubnica	Dubnica nad Váhom	Mestský futbalový štadión	5,450
MŠK Žilina B	Žilina	Štadión pod Dubňom	11,258
Humenné	Humenné	Štadión Humenné	1,806
Považská Bystrica	Považská Bystrica	Štadión MŠK Považská Bystrica	2,500
1. FC Tatran Prešov	Prešov	Štadión ŠK FC Ličartovce	1,400
FK Pohronie	Žiar nad Hronom	Mestský štadión Žiar nad Hronom	2,309
Spartak Myjava	Myjava	Stadium Myjava	2,709
MFK Dolný Kubín	Dolný Kubín	Stadium MUDr. Ivan Chodák	1,950
Slovan Bratislava U21	Bratislava	Štadión Pasienky	11,401
FK Rača	Bratislava	Štadión FK Rača	4,200

=== Personnel and kits ===
Note: Flags indicate national team as has been defined under FIFA eligibility rules. Players and Managers may hold more than one non-FIFA nationality.

Team	Head coach	Captain	Kit manufacturer	Shirt sponsor
FK Slavoj Trebišov	(Slovakia) Branislav Sokoli	(Slovakia) Roman Begala	(Germany) Adidas	Armstav
MŠK Žilina B	(Slovakia) Vladimír Veselý	(Slovakia) Dominik Šnajder	(United States) Nike	Preto
KFC Komárno	(Slovakia) Mikuláš Radványi	(Slovakia) Martin Šimko	(Germany) Adidas	MOL
FC Petržalka	(Slovakia) Alexander Zachariáš	(Slovakia) Lukáš Gašparovič	(Italy) Erreà	PORTUM Towers
FC ŠTK 1914 Šamorín	(Slovakia) Juraj Ančic	(Slovakia) Juraj Pančík	(Italy) Kappa	Slovnaft
FK Dubnica	(Czech Republic) Bohumil Páník	(Slovakia) Martin Adamec	(Germany) Adidas	
MŠK Púchov	(Slovakia) Vladimír Cifranič	(Slovakia) Peter Pilný	(Germany) Jako	reinoo
FC Košice	(Slovakia) Anton Šoltis	(Slovakia) Ján Krivák	(Germany) Adidas	niké
FK Humenné	(Slovakia) Ondrej Desiatnik	(Slovakia) Ján Dzúrik	(Italy) Sportika	Triada
MŠK Považská Bystrica	(Slovakia) Peter Jakuš	(Slovakia) Patrik Begáň	(Denmark) Hummel	
1. FC Tatran Prešov	(Slovakia) Marek Petruš	(Slovakia) Jozef Dolný	(Slovakia) 3b	Niké
FK Pohronie	(Slovakia) Rastislav Urgela	(Slovakia) Peter Mazan	(Italy) Erreà	REMESLO
MFK Dolný Kubín	(Slovakia) Ján Haspra	(Slovakia) Peter Sopúch	(Slovakia) 3b	ORAVing
FK Rača	(Slovakia) Richard Stražan	(Slovakia) Marek Sokol	(Germany) Adidas	
Slovan Bratislava U21	(Slovakia) Vladimír Gála	(Slovakia) Samuel Habodasz	(Germany) Adidas	niké
Spartak Myjava	(Slovakia) Daniel Kvasnica	(Slovakia) Štefan Pekár	(Germany) Erima	NAD - RESS

== League table ==
Pos	Team	Pld	W	D	L	GF	GA	GD	Pts	Promotion, qualification or relegation
1	Košice (C, P)	30	20	6	4	61	21	+40	66	Promotion to Niké liga
2	Tatran Prešov	30	20	2	8	49	24	+25	62	Qualification for Promotion play-offs
3	Komárno	30	14	11	5	41	26	+15	53	
4	Žilina B	30	14	5	11	63	53	+10	47	
5	Pohronie	30	11	11	8	45	41	+4	44	
6	Slovan Bratislava U21	30	12	7	11	43	45	−2	43	
7	Spartak Myjava	30	12	7	11	46	41	+5	43	
8	Šamorín	30	12	4	14	44	50	−6	40	
9	Považská Bystrica	30	10	10	10	52	48	+4	40	
10	Púchov	30	11	5	14	47	44	+3	38	
11	Slavoj Trebišov	30	10	6	14	32	44	−12	36	
12	Petržalka	30	8	10	12	40	43	−3	34	
13	Dolný Kubín	30	10	4	16	36	60	−24	34	
14	Humenné	30	7	11	12	24	35	−11	32	
15	Rača (R)	30	6	8	16	25	52	−27	26	Relegation to 3. Liga
16	Dubnica (R)	30	6	7	17	38	59	−21	25	Relegation to 3. Liga

Source: Futbalnet (in Slovak)
Rules for classification: 1) Points; 2) Goal difference; 3) Goals scored; 4) Head-to-head results; 5) Head-to-head away goals scored; 6) Away goals scored; 7) Play-off.
(C) Champions; (P) Promoted; (R) Relegated

== Results ==
Each team plays home-and-away against every other team in the league, for a total of 30 matches each.

Home \ Away	POH	KOM	KOŠ	HUM	ŠAM	PET	ZAB	TRE	DUB	PÚC	SJN	PB	PRE	RAČ	DK	MYJ
Pohronie		2–1	0–1	1–1	2–2	4–0	2–2	3–0	1–1	2–1	2–2	3–2	0–1	2–1	5–1	0–4
Komárno	1–1		0–0	0–0	3–0	1–0	1–0	2–1	3–3	1–1	1–1	2–2	3–0	1–0	2–0	2–0
Košice	2–0	0–0		1–1	5–1	5–0	4–1	2–0	1–0	2–0	1–2	3–0	2–1	2–1	5–1	2–0
Humenné	2–1	1–2	0–0		3–2	1–1	0–2	0–1	3–1	1–3	0–0	2–1	0–3	2–2	0–0	1–2
Šamorín	4–0	1–0	0–1	3–1		0–2	0–0	1–2	0–2	3–2	2–4	0–0	3–0	3–1	3–1	2–4
Petržalka	3–2	1–1	2–2	0–0	1–2		2–3	3–0	1–2	1–0	2–0	2–1	2–2	0–1	7–1	1–1
Žilina B	0–3 (Note: The match between Žilina B and Pohronie was awarded 0–3 in favor of Pohronie, because no Slovak player which was under 21 appeared in the starting line-up of Žilina B.)	4–2	2–2	0–1	3–3	3–0		4–3	3–1	2–2	1–2	3–1	0–4	8–3	1–0	3–2
Slavoj Trebišov	1–1	0–1	3–1	2–1	3–1	0–0	0–1		2–1	0–0	1–4	2–1	0–2	0–0	2–3	1–1
Dubnica	0–0	0–2	1–2	0–0	1–2	1–0	4–8	0–1		3–4	3–0	0–6	0–3	1–1	3–0	2–2
Púchov	0–1	2–3	0–2	0–2	0–1	2–2	2–1	0–1	1–2		1–0	1–2	2–1	6–0	3–1	3–1
Slovan U21	1–1	1–1	0–3	0–1	2–0	2–1	3–0	2–1	2–1	1–4		2–2	0–3	0–1	1–2	2–2
Považská Bystrica	2–2	1–0	3–1	2–0	2–3	1–1	3–2	3–3	2–1	3–1	1–2		1–0	3–3	1–0	2–4
Prešov	3–0	1–2	2–1	2–0	2–1	2–1	1–0	1–0	3–1	2–1	2–1	1–0		0–0	2–0	0–1
Rača	0–0	1–0	0–3	2–0	0–1	2–1	0–3	0–1	1–1	1–2	1–2	0–0	0–2		0–2	0–1
Dolný Kubín	1–2	1–2	0–4	0–0	2–0	0–2	0–3	2–1	2–1	2–2	3–2	2–2	2–1	3–0		3–1
Myjava	1–2	1–1	0–1	1–0	1–0	1–1	2–0	3–0	3–1	0–1	1–2	2–2	0–2	2–3	2–1	

Source: Futbalnet (in Slovak)
Legend: Blue = home team win; Yellow = draw; Red = away team win.

== Season statistics ==
As of 20 May 2023

=== Top goalscorers ===
Rank	Player	Club	Goals
1	(Slovakia) Jozef Dolný	Prešov	19
2	(Senegal) Landing Sagna	Košice	15
3	(Serbia) Boris Krstić	Žilina B	12
4	(Bosnia and Herzegovina) Haris Harba	Petržalka	11
4	(Slovakia) Štefan Holiš	Púchov	11
6	(Slovakia) Erik Pačinda	Košice	10
6	(Slovakia) Lukáš Szabó	Šamorín	10
6	(Slovakia) Marek Zuziak	Pov.Bystrica	10
9	(Slovakia) Stanislav Olejník	Myjava	9
9	(Slovakia) Štefan Pekár	Myjava	9
9	(Slovakia) Patrik Mráz	Púchov	9
9	(Slovakia) Marek Jakúbek	Košice	9
9	(Slovakia) Marek Švec	Dubnica	9
9	(Slovakia) Filip Kolorédy	D.Kubín	9

=== Clean sheets ===
Rank	Player	Club	Clean sheets
1	(Slovakia) Matúš Kira	Košice	14
2	(Ukraine) Maksym Kuchynskyi	Prešov	13
3	(Slovakia) Miloslav Bréda	Komárno	11
4	(Slovakia) Samuel Belaník	Žilina B	7
4	(Slovakia) René Žákech	Rača	7
6	(Slovakia) Denis Kubica	Myjava	6
7	(Slovakia) Dávid Slávik	Humenné	5
7	(Slovakia) Samuel Vavrúš	Dubnica	5
7	(Slovakia) Adrián Knurovský	Humenné	5
10	(Nigeria) Ayotunde Ikuepamitan	Trebišov	4
10	(Ukraine) Vadym Shevchuk	Petržalka	4
10	(Slovakia) Adam Danko	Pohronie	4
10	(Slovakia) Marek Teplan	P.Bystrica	4

=== Discipline ===
==== Player ====
- Most yellow cards: 12
  - 3 Players
- Most red cards: 2
  - 5 players

==== Club ====
- Most yellow cards: 90
  - Púchov
- Most red cards: '7
  - Púchov
