= 2018–19 2. Liga (Slovakia) =

2. Liga
- Season: 2018–19
- Promoted: FK Pohronie
- Relegated: Inter Bratislava; Prešov; Lipany
- Matches: 136
- Goals: 404 (2.97 per match)
- Top goalscorer: Miladin Vujošević (23); Samir Nurković (23)
- Highest attendance: 2,478 (Poprad-Petržalka)
- Average attendance: 617

The 2018–19 2. Liga (Slovakia) is the 26th edition of the second tier 2. Liga annual football tournament, since its establishment in 1993.

== Teams ==
=== Team changes ===
Promoted from 2017–18 3. Liga	Relegated from 2017–18 Slovak First Football League	Promoted to 2018–19 Slovak First Football League	Relegated to 2018–19 3. Liga (Slovakia)
FC Petržalka; FK Dubnica; MFK Dukla Banská Bystrica; ŠK Odeva Lipany	1. FC Tatran Prešov	ŠKF Sereď	AFC Nové Mesto nad Váhom; FK Spišská Nová Ves; MFK Lokomotíva Zvolen; FK Železiarne Podbrezová II

=== Stadiums and locations ===
Location of teams in Slovak 2. liga 2018–19

Team	Location	Stadium	Capacity
1. FC Tatran Prešov	Prešov	Štadión MŠK Tesla Stropkov	2,500
MFK Skalica	Skalica	Mestský štadión Skalica	3,000
FK Poprad	Poprad	NTC Poprad	5,070
FC Lokomotíva Košice	Košice	Stadium Družstevná pri Hornáde	600
MŠK Žilina B	Žilina	Štadión pod Dubňom	11,258
KFC Komárno	Komárno	Mestský štadión Komárno	1,250
FC ŠTK 1914 Šamorín	Šamorín	Pomlé Stadium	1,950
Inter Bratislava	Stupava	Stupavský štadión	1,100
FK Slavoj Trebišov	Trebišov	Štadión Slavoj Trebišov	2,000
FK Pohronie	Žiar nad Hronom	Mestský štadión Žiar nad Hronom	2,309
MFK Tatran Liptovský Mikuláš	Liptovský Mikuláš	Stadium Liptovský Mikuláš	1,950
Partizán Bardejov	Bardejov	Mestský štadión Bardejov	3,040
FC Petržalka akadémia	Petržalka	Štadión Sklodowská	1,500
FK Dubnica	Dubnica nad Váhom	Mestský štadión	5,450
MFK Dukla Banská Bystrica	Banská Bystrica	Štadión Kremnička	2,000
ŠK Odeva Lipany	Lipany	Štadión ŠK Odeva	4,000

=== Personnel and kits ===
Note: Flags indicate national team as has been defined under FIFA eligibility rules. Players and Managers may hold more than one non-FIFA nationality.

Team	Head coach	Captain	Kit manufacturer	Shirt sponsor
1. FC Tatran Prešov	(Slovakia) Jaroslav Galko	(Slovakia) Miroslav Keresteš	ATAK Sportswear	DUHA
MFK Skalica	(Slovakia) Jozef Dojčan	(Slovakia) Lukáš Opiela	Nike	TBA
FK Poprad	(Slovakia) Marek Petruš	(Slovakia) Štefan Zošák	Adidas	Ritro
FC Lokomotíva Košice	(Slovakia) Ľuboš Benkovský	(Slovakia) Róbert Cicman	A4ka	Banco Casino
MŠK Žilina B	(Slovakia) Slavomír Konečný	(Slovakia) Peter Chríbik	Nike	Preto
KFC Komárno	(Slovakia) Jozef Olejník	(Serbia) Samir Nurković	Adidas	MOL
FC ŠTK Fluminense Šamorín	(Bosnia and Herzegovina) Sanjin Alagić	(Slovakia) Marián Štrbák	Kappa	-
FK Inter Bratislava	(Slovakia) Miroslav Jantek	(Slovakia) Tomáš Šalata	Hummel	-
FK Slavoj Trebišov	(Slovakia) Jozef Džubara	(Slovakia) Jaroslav Kolbas	Adidas	Deva
FK Pohronie	(Slovakia) Milan Nemec	(Slovakia) Lukáš Pelegríni	Erreà	Remeslo
MFK Tatran Liptovský Mikuláš	(Slovakia) Štefan Zaťko	(Slovakia) Dušan Kucharčík	Sportika SA	Verex
Partizán Bardejov	(Slovakia) Roman Berta	(Slovakia) Slavomír Kica	Adidas	Bardenergy
FC Petržalka	(Slovakia) Miroslav Mentel	(Slovakia) Juraj Piroska	Erreà	-
FK Dubnica	(Slovakia) Peter Gergely	(Slovakia) Matej Jakúbek	Joma	-
MFK Dukla Banská Bystrica	(Slovakia) Stanislav Varga	(Slovakia) Gabriel Snitka	Nike	-
ŠK Odeva Lipany	(Slovakia) Pavol Vytykač	(Slovakia) Lukáš Janič	Zeus	Odeva

== League table ==
Pos	Team	Pld	W	D	L	GF	GA	GD	Pts	Promotion or relegation
1	FK Pohronie (P)	30	18	7	5	48	25	+23	61	Promotion to Fortuna Liga
2	FK Poprad	30	18	4	8	52	36	+16	58	Qualification for promotion play-offs
3	MFK Skalica	30	16	5	9	47	32	+15	53	
4	MFK Tatran Liptovský Mikuláš	30	15	5	10	56	41	+15	50	
5	KFC Komárno	30	13	7	10	48	38	+10	46 (Note: Head-to-head: Komárno - Banská Bystrica 0-0; Banská Bystrica - Komárno 2-2)	
6	MFK Dukla Banská Bystrica	30	12	10	8	49	35	+14	46	
7	FK Dubnica nad Váhom	30	13	6	11	55	42	+13	45 (Note: Head-to-head: Petržalka - Dubnica 2-1; Dubnica - Petržalka 4-1)	
8	FC Petržalka	30	12	9	9	41	38	+3	45	
9	MŠK Žilina B	30	12	5	13	54	59	−5	41	
10	Partizán Bardejov BŠK	30	10	9	11	41	46	−5	39	
11	FC Lokomotíva Košice	30	10	8	12	38	44	−6	38	
12	FC ŠTK 1914 Šamorín	30	10	7	13	46	48	−2	37	
13	SLAVOJ Trebišov	30	8	6	16	24	44	−20	30	
14	FK Inter Bratislava (R)	30	8	5	17	37	56	−19	29	Relegation to 3. Liga
15	1. FC TATRAN Prešov (R)	30	7	6	17	30	41	−11	27	Relegation to 3. Liga
16	ŠK Odeva Lipany (R)	30	7	3	20	23	64	−41	24	Relegation to 3. Liga

Source: Futbalnet (in Slovak)
Rules for classification: 1) Points; 2) Head-to-head points; 3) Head-to-head goal difference; 4) Head-to-head away goals scored; 5) Play-off.
(P) Promoted; (R) Relegated

== Results ==
Home \ Away	DBB	POH	INT	KOM	LIP	LKE	PAR	PET	POP	SKA	STV	LMI	PRE	DUB	SAM	ZAB
Dukla Banská Bystrica		0–1	1–1	2–2	3–0	2–1	2–0	0–2	3–3	3–1	4–1	0–1	2–0	2–0	1–1	2–1
Pohronie	0–2		1–0	4–1	0–1	4–0	4–1	2–0	2–1	3–0	1–1	2–1	2–1	2–1	2–1	1–0
Inter Bratislava	3–2	1–1		2–0	4–1	1–0	2–3	2–1	0–0	0–1	3–1	1–3	0–1	1–2	3–2	1–1
Komárno	0–0	1–1	3–1		4–0	0–2	1–2	2–0	0–1	3–1	2–1	5–1	2–0	1–1	1–3	1–4
Lipany	0–0	1–2	1–0	1–5		0–1	2–0	0–2	2–1	0–0	1–0	0–2	1–0	2–5	1–3	0–2
Lokomotíva Košice	0–2	1–1	5–0	0–0	2–1		2–1	1–2	2–0	0–3	0–0	1–1	2–1	1–1	1–0	1–3
Partizán Bardejov	1–2	1–1	2–0	0–0	3–1	1–1		1–1	0–1	0–0	0–3	1–1	3–1	2–1	1–0	3–0
Petržalka	3–1	1–1	1–1	2–0	4–1	2–2	0–1		1–2	2–2	0–0	2–0	1–1	2–1	3–0	2–1
Poprad	2–1	2–1	2–1	0–2	7–0	2–1	5–2	0–1		1–0	5–0	0–5	1–3	2–1	3–2	1–0
Skalica	2–1	0–2	2–0	2–1	3–0	2–1	1–2	2–0	4–0		2–0	2–1	1–1	1–0	2–0	5–1
Slavoj Trebišov	1–0	0–1	2–1	0–1	1–0	1–1	1–0	1–1	0–1	0–2		0–3	2–0	2–0	0–2	1–3
Tatran Liptovský Mikuláš	2–2	1–1	2–1	2–1	3–2	5–1	3–2	1–2	0–1	1–3	0–2		1–0	1–4	3–0	4–0
Tatran Prešov	1–4	0–1	1–2	1–2	0–1	5–1	1–1	1–1	1–3	0–0	3–0	0–2		1–0	2–0	0–0
Dubnica	1–1	2–0	5–1	1–3	2–1	2–1	1–1	4–1	0–0	4–0	4–2	3–2	2–1		1–1	4–1
Šamorín	1–1	0–3	5–1	2–2	2–2	0–3	2–2	2–1	0–4	1–0	2–0	2–2	1–2	3–1		6–0
Žilina B	3–3	3–1	4–3	1–2	3–0	1–3	6–4	5–0	1–1	4–3	1–1	0–2	2–1	3–1	0–2	

Source: Futbalnet (in Slovak)
Legend: Blue = home team win; Yellow = draw; Red = away team win.

== Season statistics ==
=== Top goalscorers ===
As of 25 May 2019

Rank	Player	Club	Goals
1	(Montenegro) Miladin Vujošević	Dubnica	23
1	(Serbia) Samir Nurković	Komárno	23
3	(Slovakia) Stanislav Šesták	Poprad	18
4	(Czech Republic) Roman Haša	Skalica	16
5	(Brazil) Matheus Antonio Souza Santos	Šamorín	12
5	(Slovakia) Erik Prekop	Petržalka	12
7	(Slovakia) Jakub Šulc	Inter	11
7	(Slovakia) Filip Balaj	Žilina B	11
9	(Slovakia) Rajmund Mikuš	Dubnica	10
9	(Slovakia) Adam Kopas	Žilina B	10
9	(Slovakia) Richard Bartoš	L. Mikuláš	10
9	(Serbia) Dragan Andrić	Skalica	10
