= 2021–22 3. Liga (Slovakia) =

3. Liga
- Season: 2021–22

The 2021–22 3. Liga (Slovakia) season was the 29th edition of the third tier 3. Liga (Slovakia) annual football competition since its establishment in 1993. 66 teams contested being divided into three geographic groups of 16 teams: 3. liga Bratislava, 3. liga Západ (West), 3. liga Stred (Central), 3. liga Východ (Eastern); except group (Západ) composed of 18 teams.

== League tables ==
=== Bratislava ===
Pos	Team	Pld	W	D	L	GF	GA	GD	Pts	Promotion or relegation
1	Slovan Ivanka pri Dunaji (X)	15	13	1	1	33	8	+25	40	Promotion to 2. Liga
2	Rača (X)	15	12	2	1	55	17	+38	38	Possible Relegation to 4. Liga
3	Rovinka (Y)	14	10	3	1	30	7	+23	33	Possible Relegation to 4. Liga
4	Inter Bratislava	15	10	2	3	33	12	+21	32	Possible Relegation to 4. Liga
5	Malacky (Y)	15	10	1	4	28	15	+13	31	Relegation to 4. Liga
6	Rusovce (Y)	15	9	2	4	30	16	+14	29	Relegation to 4. Liga
7	Vrakuňa (Y)	15	8	1	6	29	28	+1	25	Relegation to 4. Liga
8	Tomášov (R)	15	6	4	5	28	18	+10	22	Relegation to 4. Liga
9	Dunajská Lužná (R)	15	6	2	7	21	27	−6	20	Relegation to 4. Liga
10	Senec (R)	14	4	1	9	15	29	−14	13	Relegation to 4. Liga
11	Pezinok (R)	15	3	3	9	20	24	−4	12	Relegation to 4. Liga
12	Slovan Most pri Bratislave (R)	15	4	0	11	15	36	−21	12	Relegation to 4. Liga
13	Kalinkovo (R)	15	3	1	11	14	31	−17	10	Relegation to 4. Liga
14	Bernolákovo (R)	15	2	4	9	15	35	−20	10	Relegation to 4. Liga
15	Nová Dedinka (R)	15	3	1	11	20	46	−26	10	Relegation to 4. Liga
16	Lokomotíva Devínska Nová Ves (R)	15	0	4	11	3	40	−37	4	Relegation to 4. Liga

Updated to match(es) played on unknown. Source: Soccerway
Rules for classification: 1) Points; 2) Head-to-head points; 3) Head-to-head goal difference; 4) Head-to-head away goals scored; 5) Play-off.
(R) Relegated; (X) ?; (Y) Best remain in the 3. Liga (Slovakia)

=== Západ (West) ===
Pos	Team	Pld	W	D	L	GF	GA	GD	Pts	Promotion or relegation
1	Považská Bystrica (C, P)	34	27	4	3	90	27	+63	85	Promotion to 2. Liga
2	Spartak Myjava (P)	34	24	5	5	71	27	+44	77	Promotion to 2. Liga
3	Beluša	34	22	6	6	60	28	+32	72	
4	Slovan Duslo Šaľa	24	14	4	6	49	24	+25	46	
5	Kalná nad Hronom (X)	23	11	8	4	34	27	+7	41	
6	Dynamo Malženice (X)	24	10	8	6	44	27	+17	38	
7	Častkovce	24	9	4	11	40	31	+9	31	
8	Slovan Galanta	24	10	6	8	33	31	+2	36	Possible Relegation to 4. Liga
9	Nové Mesto nad Váhom	24	9	3	12	32	28	+4	30	Possible Relegation to 4. Liga
10	Družstevník Veľké Ludince	23	7	5	11	31	37	−6	26	Possible Relegation to 4. Liga
11	Nové Zámky	24	9	4	11	33	36	−3	31	Possible Relegation to 4. Liga
12	Marcelová	24	6	8	10	24	25	−1	26	Relegation to 4. Liga
13	Imeľ (Y)	24	8	6	10	27	36	−9	30	Relegation to 4. Liga
14	Crystal Lednické Rovne (Y)	23	7	2	14	15	29	−14	23	Relegation to 4. Liga
15	ViOn Zlaté Moravce-Vráble B (R)	24	6	3	15	25	57	−32	21	Relegation to 4. Liga
16	FC Nitra (R)	24	8	0	16	31	47	−16	24	Relegation to 4. Liga
17	Levice (R)	24	3	5	16	16	64	−48	14	Relegation to 4. Liga
18	Partizánske (R)	24	4	6	14	23	49	−26	18	Relegation to 4. Liga

Updated to match(es) played on unknown. Source: Soccerway
Rules for classification: 1) Points; 2) Head-to-head points; 3) Head-to-head goal difference; 4) Head-to-head away goals scored; 5) Play-off.
(C) Champions; (P) Promoted; (R) Relegated; (X) Assured of the Possible Relegation; (Y) Best remain in the 3. Liga (Slovakia)

=== Stred (Central) ===
Pos	Team	Pld	W	D	L	GF	GA	GD	Pts	Promotion or relegation
1	Dolný Kubín (X)	25	18	2	5	70	28	+42	56	Promotion to 2. Liga
2	Rakytovce (X)	25	16	5	4	47	18	+29	53	
3	Fomat Martin	25	16	5	4	47	23	+24	53	
4	Tatran Oravské Veselé	25	14	5	6	48	24	+24	47	
5	Jednota Bánová	25	13	6	6	37	13	+24	45	
6	Novohrad Lučenec	25	13	3	9	39	31	+8	42	
7	Podkonice	25	11	6	8	48	31	+17	39	Possible Relegation to 4. Liga
8	Fiľakovo	25	11	6	8	34	30	+4	39	Possible Relegation to 4. Liga
9	Baník Kalinovo	25	10	6	9	34	33	+1	36	Possible Relegation to 4. Liga
10	Tatran Krásno nad Kysucou	25	9	3	13	39	42	−3	30	Possible Relegation to 4. Liga
11	Prameň Kováčová (Y)	25	8	3	14	28	42	−14	27	Relegation to 4. Liga
12	Liptovský Hrádok (Y)	25	8	3	14	36	60	−24	27	Relegation to 4. Liga
13	Rimavská Sobota (Y)	25	8	2	15	23	51	−28	26	Relegation to 4. Liga
14	Nová Baňa-Žarnovica (Y)	25	6	1	18	27	61	−34	19	Relegation to 4. Liga
15	Družstevník Liptovská Štiavnica (R)	25	4	6	15	24	49	−25	18	Relegation to 4. Liga
16	Čadca (R)	25	1	6	18	22	67	−45	9	Relegation to 4. Liga

Updated to match(es) played on unknown. Source: Soccerway
Rules for classification: 1) Points; 2) Head-to-head points; 3) Head-to-head goal difference; 4) Head-to-head away goals scored; 5) Play-off.
(R) Relegated; (X) ?; (Y) Best remain in the 3. Liga (Slovakia)

=== Východ (Eastern) ===
==== Changes ====
The following teams have changed division since the 2020–21 season:

===== To 2. liga =====
Relegated from 2. liga

- Poprad

Promoted from 4. liga

- Raslavice
- Rudňany

===== From 2. liga =====
Promoted to 2. liga

- Humenné

Relegated to 4. liga

- Bardejovská Nová Ves

Relegated to 5. liga

- Plavnica (due to financial problems)

==== League table ====
Pos	Team	Pld	W	D	L	GF	GA	GD	Pts	Promotion or relegation
1	Tatran Prešov (C, P)	30	25	2	3	103	20	+83	77	Promotion to 2. Liga
2	Spišská Nová Ves (X)	30	20	7	3	76	25	+51	67	
3	Odeva Lipany	30	20	6	4	86	23	+63	66	
4	Slávia TU Košice (X)	30	16	8	6	68	35	+33	56	
5	Tesla Stropkov	30	19	4	7	76	26	+50	61	
6	Vranov nad Topľou	30	16	5	9	59	40	+19	53	
7	Snina (X)	30	15	3	12	58	41	+17	48	
8	Poprad	30	13	7	10	42	37	+5	46	Possible Relegation to 4. Liga
9	Mladosť Kalša (Y)	30	11	3	16	52	80	−28	36	Possible Relegation to 4. Liga
10	Slovan Giraltovce (Y)	30	9	8	13	35	47	−12	35	Possible Relegation to 4. Liga
11	Svidník (Y)	30	9	2	19	39	81	−42	29	Possible Relegation to 4. Liga
12	Spišské Podhradie (Y)	30	7	7	16	26	76	−50	28	Relegation to 4. Liga
13	Sobrance - Sobranecko (Y)	30	7	6	17	37	64	−27	27	Relegation to 4. Liga
14	Raslavice (R)	30	6	5	19	35	70	−35	23	Relegation to 4. Liga
15	Rudňany (R)	30	4	3	23	40	99	−59	15	Relegation to 4. Liga
16	POKROK SEZ Krompachy (R)	30	3	4	23	23	91	−68	13	Relegation to 4. Liga

Updated to match(es) played on unknown. Source: Soccerway
Rules for classification: 1) Points; 2) Head-to-head points; 3) Head-to-head goal difference; 4) Head-to-head away goals scored; 5) Play-off.
(C) Champions; (P) Promoted; (R) Relegated; (X) At worst reach the possible relegation; (Y) Best remain in the 3. Liga (Slovakia)

== See also ==
- 2021–22 Slovak First Football League
- 2021–22 2. Liga (Slovakia)
- 2021–22 Slovak Cup
