= 2022–23 3. Liga (Slovakia) =

3. Liga
- Season: 2022–23

The 2022–23 3. Liga (Slovakia) was the 30th edition of the third tier 3. Liga (Slovakia) since its establishment in 1993. 32 teams contested being divided into two geographic groups of 16 teams each: 3. liga Západ (West) and 3. liga Východ (East).

== Západ (West) ==
Pos	Team	Pld	W	D	L	GF	GA	GD	Pts	Promotion or relegation
1	Malženice (C, P)	28	19	5	4	54	20	+34	62	Promotion to 2. Liga
2	Slovan Galanta	28	17	5	6	58	32	+26	56	
3	Sereď	28	15	9	4	53	22	+31	54	
4	Beluša	28	15	7	6	61	29	+32	52	
5	Častkovce	28	12	11	5	51	36	+15	47	
6	Družstevník Veľké Ludince	28	12	5	11	38	30	+8	41	
7	Nové Mesto nad Váhom	28	10	9	9	39	42	−3	39	
8	Podkonice	28	9	11	8	39	31	+8	38	
9	Hamsik Academy Banská Bystrica	28	10	7	11	33	31	+2	37	
10	Jednota Bánová	28	9	8	11	46	45	+1	35	
11	Slovan Duslo Šaľa	28	9	8	11	43	48	−5	35	
12	Fomat Martin	28	10	5	13	45	41	+4	35	
13	Inter Bratislava (R)	28	8	7	13	34	43	−9	31	Relegation to 4. Liga
14	Nové Zámky (R)	28	2	3	23	19	91	−72	9	Relegation to 4. Liga
15	Vrakuňa Bratislava (R)	28	1	4	23	23	95	−72	7	Relegation to 4. Liga
16	Kalná nad Hronom (R)	0	0	0	0	0	0	0	0	Relegation to 4. Liga

Updated to match(es) played on unknown. Source: futbalsfz.sk
Rules for classification: 1) Points; 2) Head-to-head points; 3) Head-to-head goal difference; 4) Head-to-head away goals scored; 5) Play-off.
(C) Champions; (P) Promoted; (R) Relegated

== Východ (Eastern) ==
=== Changes ===
The following teams have changed division since the 2020–21 season:

==== To 2. liga ====
Relegated from 2. liga

- Námestovo
- Bardejov

Promoted from 4. liga

- TBA
- TBA

==== From 2. liga ====
Promoted to 2. liga

- Tatran Prešov

Relegated to 4. liga

- TBA

Relegated to 5. liga

- TBA (due to financial problems)

=== League table ===
Pos	Team	Pld	W	D	L	GF	GA	GD	Pts	Promotion or relegation
1	Spišská Nová Ves (C, P)	30	22	5	3	68	21	+47	71	Promotion to 2. Liga
2	Odeva Lipany	30	22	3	5	69	28	+41	69	
3	Vranov nad Topľou	30	18	8	4	58	25	+33	62	
4	Snina	30	14	5	11	54	42	+12	47	
5	Rimavská Sobota	30	14	5	11	58	58	0	47	
6	Oravské Veselé	30	12	9	9	48	38	+10	45	
7	Slávia TU Košice	30	13	5	12	52	44	+8	44	
8	Bardejov	30	11	8	11	46	44	+2	41	
9	Tesla Stropkov	30	11	3	16	45	55	−10	36	
10	Svidník	30	8	9	13	33	48	−15	33	
11	Fiľakovo	30	9	4	17	38	55	−17	31	
12	Kalinovo	30	7	9	14	38	60	−22	30	
13	Lučenec	30	6	12	12	23	34	−11	30	
14	Slovan Giraltovce	30	7	6	17	19	53	−34	27	
15	Námestovo	30	6	8	16	26	53	−27	26	
16	Poprad (R)	30	7	7	16	33	50	−17	28	Relegation to 4. Liga

Updated to match(es) played on unknown. Source: futbalsfz.sk
Rules for classification: 1) Points; 2) Head-to-head points; 3) Head-to-head goal difference; 4) Head-to-head away goals scored; 5) Play-off.
(C) Champions; (P) Promoted; (R) Relegated

== See also ==
- 2022–23 Slovak First Football League
- 2022–23 2. Liga (Slovakia)
- 2022–23 Slovak Cup
