= Peter Jánošík =

Slovak footballer

Personal information
- Full name: Peter Jánošík
- Date of birth: 2 January 1988 (age 38)
- Place of birth: Dubnica nad Váhom, Czechoslovakia
- Height: 1.87 m (6 ft 2 in)
- Position: Centre-back

Team information
- Current team: Spartak Dubnica nad Váhom

Senior career*
Years	Team	Apps	(Gls)
2007–2009	Dubnica	48	(3)
2008	→ Banská Bystrica (loan)	1	(0)
2010–2013	Slovan Bratislava	33	(0)
2012–2013	→ Hradec Králové (loan)	16	(0)
2014	→ Dubnica (loan)	9	(1)
2014–2015	Spartak Myjava	45	(1)
2016–2017	Polonia Bytom	34	(1)
2017	Skalica	15	(0)
2018	Dynamo Malženice		
2018–2019	Fluminense Šamorín	12	(0)
2019–2024	KOVO Beluša		
2024	LR Crystal Lednické Rovne		
2024–	Spartak Dubnica nad Váhom		

International career
2006–2007	Slovakia U19	14	(0)
2009–2010	Slovakia U21	12	(0)
- * Club domestic league appearances and goals as of 00:21, 2 January 2025 (UTC)

Peter Jánošík (born 2 January 1988) is a Slovak professional footballer who plays as a centre-back for Spartak Dubnica nad Váhom.

== Career ==
In 2019, Jánošík joined KOVO Beluša.

== Honours ==
Slovan Bratislava

- Slovak First Football League: 2009–10
- Slovak Cup: 2009–10, 2010–11
