= Michal Jonáš =

Slovak footballer

Personal information
- Full name: Michal Jonáš
- Date of birth: 25 September 1986 (age 40)
- Place of birth: Myjava, Czechoslovakia
- Height: 1.86 m (6 ft 1 in)
- Position: Defender

Youth career
- Senica
- Dubnica

Senior career*
Years	Team	Apps	(Gls)
2005–2007	Dubnica	35	(3)
2007–2009	Slovan Liberec	10	(0)

International career
2007	Slovakia U21		
2006	Slovakia	1	(1)
- * Club domestic league appearances and goals

Michal Jonáš (born 25 September 1986) is a Slovak former football player who played club football for Senica and Dubnica in Slovakia and FC Slovan Liberec in the Czech Republic. He played for Slovakia, scoring a goal in his only appearance for the side in a 2006 friendly match.

== Club career ==
The son of a village footballer, Jonáš played his first professional football for Senica in the Slovak Second League, scoring on his debut for the club. He later moved to Dubnica nad Váhom, where he combined his football career with education, studying electrical engineering there. He played for Dubnica in the Slovak First League, again scoring on his club debut, against Artmedia Petržalka. During his time with Dubnica he made 35 league appearances, scoring three goals. In February 2007, Jonáš joined Czech club FC Slovan Liberec, where he signed a three-and-a-half-year contract.

== International career ==
Jonáš was one of ten players to make their debut for Slovakia national football team in a friendly game against the United Arab Emirates held at the Zayed Sports City Stadium in Abu Dhabi. Selected by coach Ján Kocian, Jonáš opened the scoring in the second half of the 10 December 2006 match, with Slovakia going on to win 2–1.

== Car accident and early end of career ==
On 23 November 2007, Jonáš had a serious car accident in the Czech Republic, near Hodonín in the South Moravian Region, from which he suffered injuries including a brain haemorrhage, a bruised lung and a broken collarbone. He spent three months in an induced coma. In 2012, Jonáš returned to football, this time at an amateur level.
