= Beluša =

- Municipality
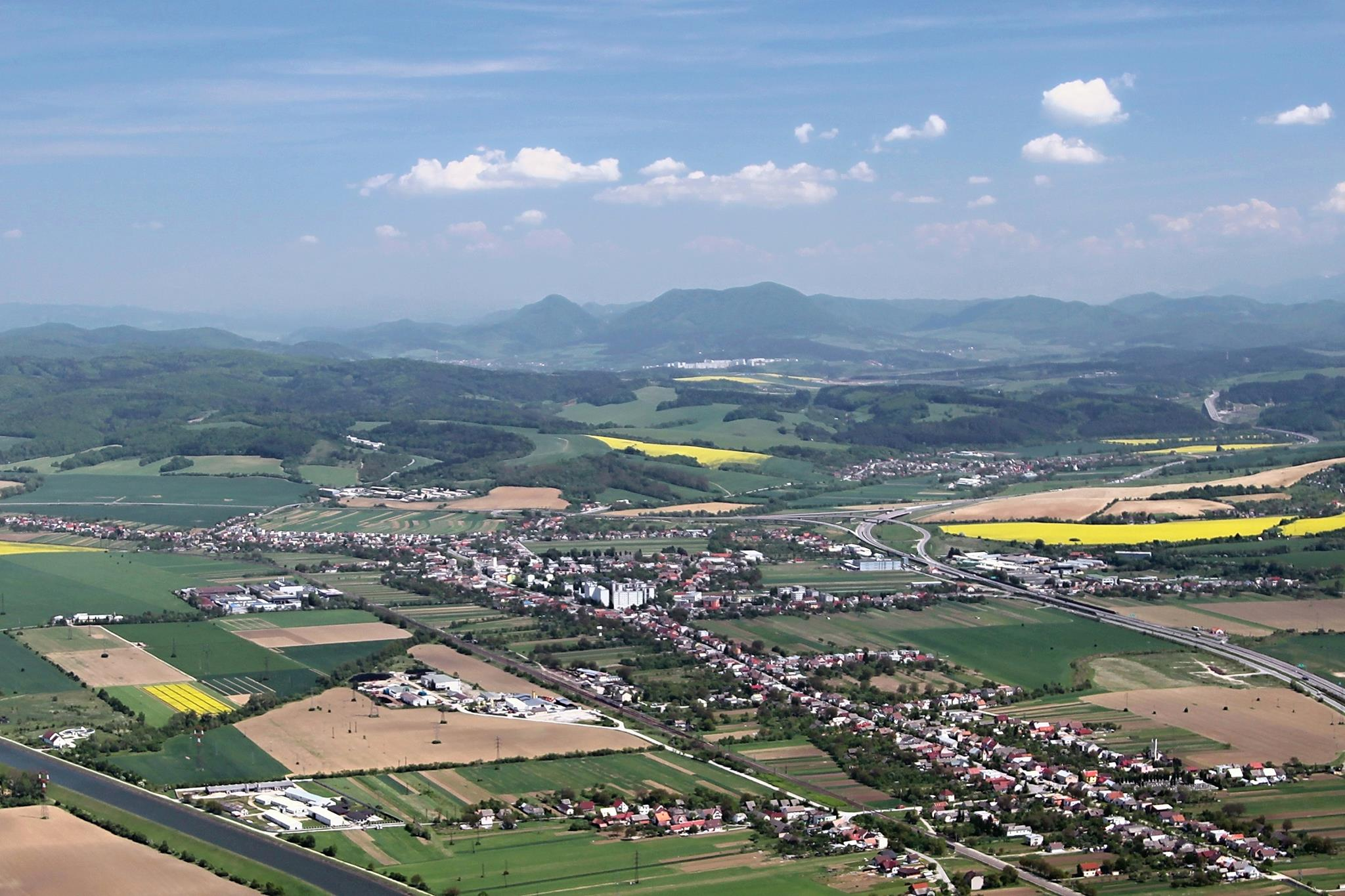
- Panorama view of Beluša

- Flag Coat of arms

- Location of Beluša in the Trenčín Region Location of Beluša in Slovakia
- Coordinates: 49.07°N 18.33°E
- Country: Slovakia
- Region: Trenčín Region
- District: Púchov District
- First mentioned: 1330

Government
  - Mayor: Ján Prekop

Area
  - Total: 51.32 km^{2} (19.81 sq mi)
- Elevation: 254 m (833 ft)

Population (2025)
  - Total: 6,199
- Time zone: UTC+1 (CET)
  - Summer (DST): UTC+2 (CEST)
- Postal code: 186 1
- Area code: +421 42
- Vehicle registration plate (until 2022): PU
- Website: www.belusa.sk

Beluša (German: Bellusch, Hungarian: Bellus) is a large village and municipality in Púchov District in the Trenčín Region of north-western Slovakia. It is located in the northern parts of the Ilava Basin and is one of the largest communities of the Považie region.

== History ==
The archaeological evidence shows that the village has been inhabited already in the Neolithic and early Bronze Age. It was mentioned for the first time in a written document in 1330. There is a Romanesque St Anne chapel from the mid-13th century in the village. This was already mentioned in the Papal documentation in 1332 which makes the rectory one of oldest one on the river Váh. The little church can be still found in the village center. The main church located right next to it has been dedicated to St. Elizabeth and it was built in 1560. The newest church standing in Beluša Hloža is known as Our Lady of Sorrows church and was built in 1990. It is clearly visible from the D1 freeway. Finally, in Beluša part Hloža on the Trenčianská Street can be also found a small St. John of Nepomuk chapel. This one has been standing there since 1766.

The close proximity to the river Váh as well Pružinka creek brought several times devastating floods to the village. The worst on record happened between August 26–28, 1813 and June the 2nd 1823 respectively. The most recent one took place in 1939. Pružinka Creek has been regulated since 1940 and therefore effectively preventing any further flooding.

In September 1827, a fire burned 130 houses. In the beginning of the 19th century, the town inaugurated the first basket-maker school of the Kingdom of Hungary. Plague, which was major problem in Europe wiped out 262 inhabitants in 1831.

An important day for the village was July 24, 1913 which brought the first pharmacy to Beluša. The license was issued to Julius Thaller. The first pharmacy was located very close to the church.

Until 1918, Beluša municipality in the county Trenčín (same as the rest of Slovakia) has been a part of the Kingdom of Hungary. After the Trianon Treaty it became part of the newly formed Czechoslovakia.

Prior to the World War II there used to be a small Jewish community in the village. Currently the only proof of their presence is a small Jewish cemetery hidden in the north part of the village. It has been recently renovated and it's been documented in the Jewish archives.

== Geography ==
The municipality lies at an altitude of 254 metres (833 ft) and covers an area of 51.32 km^{2} (19.81 sq mi) (2025).

The municipality consists of four parts: Beluša, Belušské Slatiny, Hloža, Podhorie (incorporated in 1976). The town hall is located in Beluša.

The village is also an important crossroad on the main road from Trenčín to Žilina. The main freeway D1 connecting Bratislava with Žilina bypasses Beluša. The main railway line from Bratislava to Košice via Žilina has got a stop here. The railway line built in the years 1878-1883 helped significantly to the development. In 1883 the railways station was completed. Currently the line is being updated to the higher speed. Once fully completed the average train speed should be around 160 km/h. River Váh (tributary of the Danube river) flows close to the village.

== Beluša Baths/Belušské Slatiny ==
Part of Beluša are also the Beluša Baths (Belušské Slatiny). The spa used to be more popular, but then it lost majority of its thermal water. After some extensive drilling there was an interesting outcome. There is a direct connection between the spring in Beluša Baths and the one in the spa resort town of Trenčianske Teplice. Outdoor swimming pool in Beluša Baths is a popular summer place for the locals. All year round the spa with sulfur-aerated warm water can be enjoy in one of the hotels. Many of the bigger businesses in the region have their hotels and cottages in Beluša Baths.

== Population ==
Population statistic (10 years)
Year	1995	2005	2015	2025
Count	6035	6061	5833	6199
Difference		+0.43%	−3.76%	+6.27%

Population statistic
Year	2024	2025
Count	6183	6199
Difference		+0.25%

It has a population of 6199 people (31 December 2025).

=== Ethnicity ===
Census 2021 (1+ %)
Ethnicity	Number	Fraction
Slovak	5951	96.57%
Not found out	194	3.14%
Total	6162	

In year 2021 was 6162 people by ethnicity 5951 as Slovak, 194 as Not found out, 30 as Czech, 20 as Other, 12 as Russian, 4 as Rusyn, 4 as Polish, 4 as Moravian, 4 as Hungarian, 3 as Ukrainian, 3 as Romanian, 3 as Bulgarian, 2 as Serbian, 1 as Vietnamese, 1 as Romani, 1 as Greek, 1 as Croatian and 1 as English.

Note on population: The difference values of population numbers in the table "Population statistic" and in the sections "Ethnicity" & "Religion" is caused by the use of various statistical methods.

=== Religion ===
Census 2021 (1+ %)
Religion	Number	Fraction
Roman Catholic Church	4758	77.22%
None	903	14.65%
Not found out	260	4.22%
Evangelical Church	80	1.3%
Total	6162	

In year 2021 was 6162 people by religion 4758 from Roman Catholic Church, 903 from None, 260 from Not found out, 80 from Evangelical Church, 33 from Ad hoc movements, 31 from Greek Catholic Church, 18 from Christian Congregations in Slovakia, 16 from Other and not ascertained christian church, 15 from Paganism and natural spirituality, 14 from Other, 10 from Eastern Orthodox Church, 6 from Old Catholic Church, 5 from Calvinist Church, 5 from Seventh-day Adventist Church, 5 from Buddhism, 2 from Islam and 1 from Hinduism.

== Economy ==
There are several mid-size factories in the village. (Best Beluša, Koval, Pemex, CCN, Elastomer Solution and Metalform) Linco margarine is also produced in the village.

== Sport ==
The most popular sport in the village is soccer. The modest stadium can accommodate 700 spectators (400 seated), but highest number od spectators are 2550 ( Beluša vs DAC (2016)) The team has been participant of 3rd league. Team TJ KOVO Beluša win 3rd League in 2019, but stay in 3rd League. Most popular players are Matej Gorelka, Peter Mišutka. In the Team play players from first, second League . Proximity of village of Mojtin offers skiing in the winter. The nearest indoor swimming pool is in nearby Puchov. Hiking in woods as is also common by the locals and tourist alike.

== Notable people ==
- Emanuel Filo, Former dean of Comenius University in Bratislava and MD
- Pavel Šulek, Slovak physicist
- Pavel Adami (1739–1814), veterinarian
- Vojtech Ambrus (1909–1979), teacher and biologist
- Jozef Kočiš (1928–2013), historian and writer

== See also ==
- List of municipalities and towns in Slovakia

== Genealogical resources ==
The records for genealogical research are available at the state archive "Statny Archiv in Bytca, Slovakia"

- Roman Catholic church records (births/marriages/deaths): 1675-1895 (parish A)
- Lutheran church records (births/marriages/deaths): 1784-1909 (parish B)
