= Anton Dragúň =

Slovak footballer and manager

Personal information
- Date of birth: 11 June 1942 (age 84)
- Place of birth: Bánkeszi, Hungary

Senior career*
| Years | Team | Apps | (Gls) |
- Lokomotíva Bánov
- ZVL ŠK Malacky
- ČH Bratislava
- TŽ Třinec
| ?–1970 | Nové Zámky | | |

Managerial career
- Lokomotíva Bánov
- Nové Zámky
- Inter Bratislava (assistant coach)
- Prievidza
- 1987–1989: Dukla Banská Bystrica
- 1989–1990: Dunajská Streda
- 1990–1994: Horn
- 1995: Slovan Bratislava
- 1995–1998: Šaľa
- 1998–2000: Dubnica
- 1999–2001: Slovakia (assistant coach)
- 2001: Slovan Bratislava
- 2001: AS Trenčín
- 2002: ASK Klingenbach
- 2003: AS Trenčín
- 2004–2006: Zlaté Moravce
- 2006–2008: Dubnica
- 2011: Iraklis Thessaloniki
- 2011–2012: Slovan Galanta
- 2013–2014: Ružiná
- 2014: Borčice
- * Club domestic league appearances and goals

Anton Dragúň (born 11 June 1942) is a Slovak football manager and former player. He managed TJ Baník Ružiná.
