= Michal Filo =

Slovak footballer

Personal information
- Date of birth: 28 February 1984 (age 42)
- Place of birth: Dubnica nad Váhom, Czechoslovakia
- Height: 1.84 m (6 ft 0 in)
- Position: Striker

Senior career*
Years	Team	Apps	(Gls)
2002–2007	FK ZTS Dubnica	89	(23)
2004	→ FC Družstevník Báč (loan)	14	(6)
2007–2009	Banská Bystrica	24	(1)
2009–2013	MFK Dubnica	44	(11)
2010–2011	→ DAC Dunajská Streda (loan)	18	(3)
2012	→ ŠKF Sereď (loan)	13	(11)
2013	→ TJ Družstevník Vrakúň (loan)		
2014	SV Karlstetten		
2015	Váhovce		

International career
2006	Slovakia	1	(0)
- * Club domestic league appearances and goals

Michal Filo (born 28 February 1984) is a Slovak former professional footballer who played as a striker. He made one appearance for the Slovakia national team.
