= Tomáš Zápotoka =

Slovak footballer

Personal information
- Full name: Tomáš Zápotoka
- Date of birth: 4 February 1987 (age 39)
- Place of birth: Bardejov, Czechoslovakia
- Height: 1.79 m (5 ft 10 1/2 in)
- Position: Striker

Team information
- Current team: FK Drustav Svidník
- Number: 8

Youth career
- 2003–2006: FK ZTS Dubnica

Senior career*
Years	Team	Apps	(Gls)
2007–2009	Dubnica	81	(12)
2010	Dubnica B	10	(3)
2010	Karviná	2	(0)
2011	→Dubnica (loan)	5	(0)
2012	Bardejov		
2013–	→Svidník (loan)		
- * Club domestic league appearances and goals as of 2 June 2011

Tomáš Zápotoka (born 4 February 1987, in Bardejov) is a Slovak football player who currently plays for FK Drustav Svidník.
