= Pavol Kopačka =

Slovak footballer

Personal information
- Full name: Pavol Kopačka
- Date of birth: 7 August 1974 (age 52)
- Place of birth: Ilava, Czechoslovakia
- Height: 1.84 m (6 ft 1/2 in)
- Position: Defensive midfielder

Team information
- Current team: TJ Štart Tuchyňa

Youth career
- ZTS Dubnica

Senior career*
Years	Team	Apps	(Gls)
- Topoľčany
- FC Brumov
?–1999	FC Kyjov 1919		
1999–2002	FC Synot Staré Město	33	(2)
2002–2004	→AS Trenčín loan		
2004–2007	Dubnica		
2007–2009	Trnava		
2008–2009	→Nitra loan		
2009–2010	Neusiedl am See		
2010–2011	SV Leithaprodersdorf		
2011–2012	TJ Štart Tuchyňa		

Managerial career
- 2015–: Dubnica
- * Club domestic league appearances and goals as of 14 July 2011

Pavol Kopačka (born 7 August 1974) is a Slovak football midfielder who currently plays for club TJ Vlára Kľúčové .
