= Miladin Vujošević =

Montenegrin footballer

Personal information
- Full name: Miladin Vujošević
- Date of birth: 18 December 1996 (age 29)
- Place of birth: Bijelo Polje, Yugoslavia
- Height: 1.83 m (6 ft 0 in)
- Position: Forward

Team information
- Current team: Brskovo
- Number: 9

Senior career*
Years	Team	Apps	(Gls)
2015	Jagodina Tabane		
2015	Sloga Despotovac		
2016	Berane		
2017	Fiľakovo	14	(11)
2017	Rimavská Sobota	14	(23)
2018–2019	Dubnica nad Váhom	35	(29)
2020–2021	Dukla Banská Bystrica	26	(18)
2022	Dubnica nad Váhom	16	(1)
2023	Humenné	0	(0)
2024	Jedinstvo	7	(0)
2025–2026	Borac	29	(34)
2026–	Brskovo	14	(23)
- * Club domestic league appearances and goals as of 31 October 2024

Miladin Vujošević (born 18 December 1996) is a Montenegrin footballer who plays as a forward in the Montenegrin Third League for Brskovo.

== Career ==
=== FK Jagodina ===
Vujošević is the alumni of the youth teams of Jagodina Tabane. He was a part of the squad in its, so-far, sole campaign in continental competitions, when the club was featured in 2014–15 UEFA Europa League qualifiers, when the club had failed to pass through CFR Cluj.

=== Slovak lower divisions ===
In February 2017, Vujošević had joined Fiľakovo and after half-season he had transferred to Rimavská Sobota, scoring a total of 34 goals in the calendar year's league fixtures. His story was noted by regional and national media, particularly as prior to becoming a professional footballer, he had to spend a year working as a waiter.

Despite only playing the first half of 2017–18 3. Liga Stred (Central), before a move to Dubnica nad Váhom in the 2. Liga, Vujošević managed to score 23 goals and completed the season as the second best scoring player.

=== FK Dubnica ===
In the subsequent 2. Liga season, he completed the season as a top scorer, with 23 goals, along with Samir Nurković. Dubnica finished the season ranked 5th of 16, avoiding relegation as the season's novice.

He made his 2. Liga debut for Dubnica nad Váhom against Poprad, on 21 July 2018. He scored Dubnica's only goal in 2:1 defeat, after a penalty-kick, which followed a foul against Vujošević himself.

Later, in an interview in October, he expressed a desire to play in Fortuna Liga, claiming that the style of play in Slovakia suits him.

=== Dukla Banská Bystrica ===
Vujošević during the winter break of 2019–20, Dukla Banská Bystrica, as both Dubnica and Dukla were engaged in a battle for promotion to the top division. He signed a contract of 2.5 years.

Vujošević made his debut for Dukla on 8 March 2020 in an away fixture at pod Čebraťom against Ružomberok B. The game concluded with a 1:0 win for Dukla, as Vujošević had scored the only goal of the match by a penalty kick, following a foul against Jozef Dolný.
