= Marián Zimen =

Slovak footballer

Personal information
- Full name: Marián Zimen
- Date of birth: 3 August 1980 (age 46)
- Place of birth: Trenčín, Czechoslovakia
- Height: 1.74 m (5 ft 9 in)
- Position: Defender

Team information
- Current team: Púchov (manager)

Youth career
- TTS Trenčín
- Slovan Bratislava
- Dubnica nad Váhom

Senior career*
Years	Team	Apps	(Gls)
1999–2009	Dubnica nad Váhom	142	(3)

Managerial career
- Dubnica nad Váhom (youth)
- 2010–2013: AS Trenčín (assistant)
- 2013–2018: Žilina (assistant)
- 2018–2019: Slovakia U21 (assistant)
- 2020–2021: Viktoria Plzeň (assistant)
- 2021–2022: Wisła Kraków (assistant)
- 2022: AS Trenčín (assistant)
- 2022: AS Trenčín (caretaker)
- 2022–2023: AS Trenčín
- 2023–2025: Púchov
- 2025-: FK Dubnica
- * Club domestic league appearances and goals

Marián Zimen (born 3 August 1980) is a Slovak professional football manager and former player who played as a defender. He is currently in charge of 2. Liga club Púchov.
