= Pavol Straka =

Slovak footballer

Personal information
- Full name: Pavol Straka
- Date of birth: 13 December 1980 (age 45)
- Place of birth: Trenčín, Czechoslovakia
- Height: 1.78 m (5 ft 10 in)
- Position: Forward

Team information
- Current team: SC St. Martin

Youth career
- TTS Trenčín

Senior career*
Years	Team	Apps	(Gls)
2000–2005	ZTS Dubnica	138	(33)
2005–2006	MŠK Žilina	?	(16)
2006–2007	Antalyaspor	15	(3)
2007–2008	FK Jablonec 97	15	(3)
2008–2009	FK Viktoria Žižkov		
2010	FK AS Trenčín		
2010–2012	Spartak Myjava	30	(14)
2013–2015	SC St. Martin	61	(38)
2015–2016	ESV Schwarzenau		
- * Club domestic league appearances and goals as of 15 May 2013

Pavol Straka (born 13 December 1980) is a Slovak football player who currently plays for ESV Schwarzenau. Pavol Straka made his debut for Antalyaspor against Çaykur Rizespor on 6 August 2006. He also scored Antalyaspor's 500th Turkish Super League goal in a match against Kayseri Erciyesspor which Antalyaspor won 3-1.
