= Peter Kiška =

Slovak footballer

Personal information
- Full name: Peter Kiška
- Date of birth: 10 May 1981 (age 45)
- Place of birth: Slovakia
- Height: 1.80 m (5 ft 11 in)
- Position: Midfielder

Team information
- Current team: Kissos Kissonerga F.C.

Senior career*
Years	Team	Apps	(Gls)
1999–2004	MFK Dubnica	138	(19)
2004	Sheriff Tiraspol	5	(0)
2005	MŠK Žilina	1	(0)
2005–2010	MFK Dubnica	122	(24)
2010–2011	Digenis Morphou	9	(0)
2011–	Kissos Kissonerga F.C.	0	(0)

International career^{‡}
2004	Slovakia	2	(0)
- * Club domestic league appearances and goals as of 20 November 2009 ‡ National team caps and goals as of 2 February 2010

Peter Kiška (born 10 May 1981) is a Slovak footballer who plays as a midfielder for Kissos Kissonerga F.C. in Cypriot Fourth Division.
