= Jozef Dolný =

Slovak footballer

Personal information
- Date of birth: 13 May 1992 (age 34)
- Place of birth: Spišská Nová Ves, Czechoslovakia
- Height: 1.82 m (6 ft 0 in)
- Position: Forward

Team information
- Current team: Bihor Oradea
- Number: 99

Youth career
- 1998–2003: TJ Dúbrava
- 2003–2007: Spišské Podhradie
- 2007–2010: Tatran Prešov

Senior career*
Years	Team	Apps	(Gls)
2010–2014	Tatran Prešov	39	(4)
2011	→ Zemplín Michalovce (loan)	6	(0)
2014	→ Zbrojovka Brno (loan)	1	(0)
2014	→ Dukla Banská Bystrica (loan)	17	(2)
2015–2016	Senica	43	(6)
2016–2017	Podbeskidzie Bielsko-Biała	11	(0)
2017–2018	Derry City	3	(0)
2018–2019	Skalica	24	(6)
2019	→ Dukla Banská Bystrica (loan)	11	(1)
2019–2021	Dukla Banská Bystrica	35	(7)
2021–2024	Tatran Prešov	89	(78)
2024–2026	FK Csíkszereda	50	(16)
2026–	Bihor Oradea	7	(1)

International career
2010	Slovakia U18	1	(1)
2010–2011	Slovakia U19	7	(1)
- * Club domestic league appearances and goals as of 31 October 2026

Jozef Dolný (born 13 May 1992) is a Slovak professional footballer who plays as a winger for Liga II club Bihor Oradea.

== Honours ==
Senica

- Slovak Cup runner-up: 2014–15

Tatran Prešov

- 3. Liga: 2021–22

Individual

- 2. Liga top scorer: 2022–23 (19 goals), 2023–24 (18 goals)
- 3. Liga top scorer: 2021–22 (41 goals)
