= Vadym Shevchuk =

Ukrainian footballer

Personal information
- Full name: Vadym Leonidovych Shevchuk
- Date of birth: 21 October 1995 (age 31)
- Place of birth: Zaporizhia, Ukraine
- Height: 1.80 m (5 ft 11 in)
- Position: Defender

Youth career
- 2008–2010: RVUFK Kyiv
- 2011–2012: Dynamo Kyiv

Senior career*
| Years | Team | Apps | (Gls) |
| 2012–2014 | Dynamo Kyiv | 0 | (0) |
| 2016 | Belshina Bobruisk | 13 | (0) |
| 2017 | Kafa Feodosia | 9 | (0) |
| 2017 | Kuban-Holding (amateur) | | |
| 2018 | GNS-Spartak Krasnodar (amateur) | | |
| 2019 | Kuban Krasnodar (amateur) | | |
| 2019–2020 | TSK Simferopol | 4 | (0) |

International career^{‡}
| 2011 | Ukraine U16 | 8 | (0) |
| 2011 | Ukraine U17 | 7 | (1) |
| 2012–2013 | Ukraine U18 | 11 | (0) |
| 2013 | Ukraine U19 | 4 | (0) |
- * Club domestic league appearances and goals as of 31 July 2020 ‡ National team caps and goals as of 31 January 2017

Vadym Shevchuk (Ukrainian: Вадим Леонідович Шевчук; born 21 October 1995) is a Ukrainian former professional footballer.

== Club career ==
In 2016, he plays for Belshina Bobruisk.
