= Lukáš Janič =

Slovak footballer

Personal information
- Full name: Lukáš Janič
- Date of birth: 30 December 1986 (age 39)
- Place of birth: Prešov, Czechoslovakia
- Height: 1.75 m (5 ft 9 in)
- Position: Midfielder

Team information
- Current team: Tatran Oravské Veselé

Youth career
- Tatran Prešov

Senior career*
Years	Team	Apps	(Gls)
- Tatran Prešov
2005	Odeva Lipany		
2006	Zemplín Michalovce		
2006–2010	MFK Košice	55	(2)
2010	Korona Kielce	2	(0)
2011–2012	Sandecja Nowy Sącz	36	(4)
2012	ViOn Zlaté Moravce	13	(3)
2013	Teplice	3	(0)
2013–2015	Zemplín Michalovce	23	(1)
2014	→ Sereď (loan)	7	(3)
2014–2015	→ Ružomberok (loan)	23	(2)
2015	Podbeskidzie Bielsko-Biała	7	(0)
2015	Podbeskidzie II	2	(0)
2016	VSS Košice	12	(0)
2016	SC Melk	12	(0)
2017	SV Gottsdorf	12	(1)
2017–2019	Odeva Lipany	58	(15)
2019–	Tatran Oravské Veselé		

International career
2008	Slovakia U21	2	(0)
- * Club domestic league appearances and goals as of 30 December 2023

Lukáš Janič (born 30 December 1986) is a Slovak professional footballer who plays as a midfielder for Tatran Oravské Veselé.

== Career statistics ==
Club	Season	League		Domestic Cup		Europe		Total	
Club	Season	Pld	GF	Pld	GF	Pld	GF	Pld	GF
MFK Košice	2007–08	2	0	0	0	0	0	2	0
MFK Košice	2008–09	28	2	5	1	0	0	33	3
MFK Košice	2009–10	25	0	1	0	3	0	29	0
Total		55	2	6	1	3	0	64	3

^{Last updated: 16 May 2010}

== Honours ==
MFK Košice

- Slovak Cup: 2008–09
