= František Brezničan =

Slovak footballer

Personal information
- Full name: František Brezničan
- Date of birth: 25 June 1983 (age 43)
- Place of birth: Považská Bystrica, Czechoslovakia
- Height: 1.88 m (6 ft 2 in)
- Position: Centre-back

Team information
- Current team: Spartak Lysá pod Makytou

Youth career
- Považská Bystrica
- Slovan Bratislava
- Púchov

Senior career*
Years	Team	Apps	(Gls)
2002–2003	Rapid Bratislava		
2003–2005	Dunajská Lužná		
2005–2006	Vítkovice		
2006–2008	Třinec	23	(1)
2008	Karviná	6	(1)
2008–2009	Púchov		
2010	Bodva Moldava nad Bodvou		
2011	Górnik Polkowice	17	(0)
2011–2012	Raven Považská Bystrica		
2012–2013	SC Lilienfeld	10	(5)
2013	Žiar Papradno		
2013	Púchov		
2013–2014	Žiar Papradno		
2014–2020	Púchov		
2020–2021	Junior Kanianka		
2021–	Spartak Lysá pod Makytou		
- * Club domestic league appearances and goals as of 10:50, 25 June 2024 (UTC)

František Brezničan (born 25 June 1983) is a Slovak footballer who plays as a centre-back for Spartak Lysá pod Makytou.

== Club career ==
=== Early career ===
Brezničan transferred to Czech second division side FK Třinec from MFK Vítkovice in July 2006. In January 2009 he joined FK Viktoria Žižkov. In March 2011, Brezničan joined Polish side Górnik Polkowice. He debuted for the club in a friendly match against Czarni Żagań, playing 70 minutes. He was released half year later.

=== MŠK Púchov ===
In 2014, Brezničan re-joined MŠK Púchov, where he would become captain of the team. He scored a brace in a 2–1 away win against FC Nitra B, helping his team overcome a 1 goal deficit.
