= FK Spartak Dubnica nad Váhom =

Slovak football club

- Full name: Futbalový Klub Dubnica nad Váhom
- Nickname: FK Spartak Dubnica
- Founded: 1926; 100 years ago as SK Dubnica
- Ground: Mestský futbalový štadión, Dubnica nad Váhom
- Capacity: 5,450
- Chairman: Peter Švec
- Head coach: Marián Zimen
- League: 4. liga
- 2023–24: 4. liga Západ (West), 3rd
- Website: www.fkdubnica.sk
| Home colours | Away colours | Third colours |

FK Spartak Dubnica nad Váhom is a Slovak football club, playing in the city of Dubnica nad Váhom.

== History ==
FK Dubnica was founded in 1926 and spent much of its early years playing in the regional Czechoslovak leagues until 1977 where they were finally promoted to the national first division and finished a respectable 9th in their first season. The team continued in top flight football for 10 years before being relegated in 1987 and it would be at least another 10 years before the team would play at the highest national level again but this time in the independent state of Slovakia. In 1996 Dubnica gained its promotion from the Slovak second division to form part of a newly structured league consisting of one league and 15 other teams. Dubnica would then be relegated the following season, which would set a trend of swinging between the first and second divisions. 2005 saw a turn in fortunes for Dubnica, a 4th-place finish earned them a place in Europe for the second time playing in the Intertoto Cup.

The first match saw them come up against Vasas SC of Hungary, the match ended 0–0 in the first leg but the second leg saw Dubnica duly despatch the Hungarian side 2–0 at home. This win next saw the club taken to Turkey to face tough competition in B.B. Ankaraspor but Dubnica upset the home team with a shock 4–0 win and defended this lead well in the second leg only to lose 1–0. Dubnica's next match saw them take on the English team, Newcastle United F.C. but they proved to be too strong and failed to win either legs losing 3–1 and 2–0 respectively.

In 2020, FK Dubnica nad Váhom was declared champions of the 2. Liga but lost the subsequent promotion play-off to FC Nitra, resulting in no direct promotion from the second tier that year.

=== Events timeline ===
- 1926 – Founded as SK Dubnica
- 1948 – Renamed ŠK Sokol Škoda Dubnica
- 1952 – Renamed ŠK Sokol Vorošilov
- 1953 – Renamed DŠO Spartak ŠK Dubnica
- 1962 – Renamed TJ Spartak ŠK Dubnica
- 1965 – Renamed TJ Spartak SMZ Dubnica
- 1978 – Renamed TJ Spartak ZTS ŠK Dubnica
- 1993 – Renamed FK ZTS Kerametal Dubnica
- 1999 – Renamed FK ZTS Dubnica
- 2003 – First European qualification, 2003
- 2008 – Renamed MFK Dubnica
- 2017 – Renamed FK Dubnica nad Vahom
- 2024 – Renamed FK Spartak Dubnica nad Váhom

== Honours ==
=== Domestic ===
- Slovak First League (1993 – Present)
  - Best finish: 4th – 2004–05
- Slovak second division (1993 – Present)
  - Winners (2): 2000–01, 2019–20
  - Runners-up (1): 1997–98

== Results ==
=== League and Cup history ===
Slovak League only (1993–present)

| Season | Division (Name) | Pos./Teams | Pl. | W | D | L | GS | GA | P | Slovak Cup | Europe | | Top Scorer (Goals) |
|---|---|---|---|---|---|---|---|---|---|---|---|---|---|
| 1993–94 | 2nd (1. Liga) | 14/(16) | 30 | 7 | 11 | 12 | 35 | 47 | 25 | Round 1 | | | |
| 1994–95 | 2nd (1. liga) | 5/(16) | 30 | 13 | 6 | 11 | 40 | 38 | 45 | Round 1 | | | |
| 1995–96 | 2nd (1. liga) | 4/(12) | 30 | 13 | 10 | 7 | 48 | 35 | 49 | Round 2 | | | |
| 1996–97 | 1st (Mars Superliga) | 15/(16) | 30 | 8 | 8 | 14 | 29 | 43 | 32 | Round 2 | | | |
| 1997–98 | 2nd (1. liga) | 1/(16) | 34 | 20 | 6 | 8 | 74 | 29 | 66 | Round 2 | | | |
| 1998–99 | 1st (Mars Superliga) | 13/(16) | 30 | 8 | 4 | 18 | 28 | 60 | 28 | Semi-finals | | | (Slovakia) Eugen Bari (8) |
| 1999–00 | 1st (Mars Superliga) | 11/(16) | 30 | 9 | 7 | 14 | 25 | 35 | 34 | Round 2 | | | (Slovakia) Peter Masarovič (4) |
| 2000–01 | 2nd (1. Liga) | 1/(18) | 34 | 19 | 9 | 6 | 44 | 18 | 66 | Round 1 | | | (Slovakia) Peter Masarovič (12) |
| 2001–02 | 1st (Mars Superliga) | 8/(10) | 36 | 9 | 11 | 16 | 38 | 48 | 38 | Round 1 | | | (Slovakia) Pavol Straka (8) |
| 2002–03 | 1st (Superliga) | 7/(10) | 36 | 12 | 7 | 17 | 41 | 52 | 43 | Round 2 | | | (Slovakia) Pavol Straka (12) |
| 2003–04 | 1st (Corgoň Liga) | 6/(10) | 36 | 12 | 10 | 14 | 41 | 42 | 46 | Round 1 | UI | 2.R ( (Slovenia) FC Koper) | (Slovakia) Juraj Dovičovič (13) |
| 2004–05 | 1st (Corgoň Liga) | 4/(10) | 36 | 13 | 12 | 11 | 42 | 43 | 51 | Round 1 | UI | 2.R ( (Czech Republic) Liberec) | (Slovakia) Pavol Straka (9) |
| 2005–06 | 1st (Corgoň Liga) | 8/(10) | 36 | 10 | 10 | 16 | 41 | 55 | 40 | Round 1 | UI | 3.R ( (England) Newcastle) | (Slovakia) Michal Filo (8) |
| 2006–07 | 1st (Corgoň Liga) | 10/(12) | 22 | 6 | 7 | 9 | 24 | 35 | 25 | Round 2 | | | (Slovakia) Michal Filo (10) |
| 2007–08 | 1st (Corgoň Liga) | 9/(12) | 33 | 7 | 12 | 14 | 34 | 53 | 33 | Round 3 | | | (Senegal) Mouhamadou Seye (13) |
| 2008–09 | 1st (Corgoň Liga) | 8/(12) | 33 | 10 | 6 | 16 | 43 | 49 | 37 | Quarter-finals | | | (Senegal) Mouhamadou Seye (9) |
| 2009–10 | 1st (Corgoň Liga) | 9/(12) | 33 | 8 | 12 | 14 | 27 | 42 | 36 | Round 2 | | | (Slovakia) Peter Šulek (3) (Slovakia) Michal Filo (3) (Slovakia) Tomáš Zápotoka (3) (Slovakia) Matej Gorelka (3) |
| 2010–11 | 1st (Corgoň Liga) | 12/(12) | 33 | 7 | 10 | 16 | 23 | 47 | 31 | Round 3 | | | (Slovakia) Matej Ižvolt (4) |
| 2011–12 | 2nd (2. Liga) | 8/(12) | 33 | 10 | 13 | 10 | 32 | 31 | 43 | Round 1 | | | (Slovakia) Michal Filo (8) |
| 2012–13 | 2nd (2. Liga) | 8/(12) | 33 | 11 | 8 | 14 | 31 | 38 | 41 | Round 1 | | | (Slovakia) Roland Šmahajčík (8) |
| 2013–14 | 2nd (2. Liga) | 8/(12) | 33 | 10 | 5 | 18 | 30 | 64 | 35 | Round 1 | | | (Slovakia) Roland Šmahajčík (6) |
| 2014–15 | 2nd (DOXXbet Liga) | 24/(24) | 32 | 4 | 9 | 19 | 31 | 62 | 15 | Round 3 | | | (Slovakia) Richard Čiernik (6) |
| 2015–16 | 3rd (TIPOS III. liga Západ) | 15/(18) | 32 | 6 | 12 | 14 | 27 | 43 | 30 | Round 2 | | | (Slovakia) Miloš Mojto (7) |
| 2016–17 | 3rd (TIPOS III. liga Západ) | 6/(19) | 36 | 16 | 7 | 13 | 49 | 43 | 55 | Did not enter | | | ? |
| 2017–18 | 3rd (TIPOS III. liga Západ) | 1/(16) | 34 | 27 | 5 | 2 | 83 | 10 | 86 | Round 4 | | | (Slovakia) Ján Vaško (13) |
| 2018–19 | 2nd (II. liga) | 7/(16) | 30 | 13 | 6 | 11 | 55 | 42 | 45 | Round 5 | | | (Montenegro) Miladin Vujošević (23) |
| 2019–20 | 2nd (II. liga) | 1/(16) | 20 | 14 | 4 | 2 | 45 | 22 | 46 | Round 2 | | | (Slovakia) Maroš Čurik (7) (Slovakia) Marek Kuzma (7) |
| 2020–21 | 2nd (II. liga) | 11/(15) | 28 | 8 | 9 | 11 | 28 | 37 | 33 | Round 4 | | | (Slovakia) Marek Kuzma (8) |
| 2021–22 | 2nd (II. liga) | 11/(15) | 30 | 8 | 7 | 15 | 33 | 51 | 31 | Round 2 | | | (Slovakia) Marek Kuzma (9) |
| 2022–23 | 2nd (II. liga) | 16/(16) | 30 | 6 | 7 | 17 | 38 | 59 | 25 | Round 4 | | | (Slovakia) Marek Švec (9) |
| 2023–24 | 3rd (III. liga) | 16/(16) | 30 | 4 | 1 | 25 | 29 | 88 | 10 | Round 1 | | | (Slovakia) Filip Polčák (9) |
| 2024–25 | 4th (IV. liga) | 4/(17) | 32 | 17 | 9 | 6 | 48 | 25 | 60 | Round 1 | | | (Slovakia) Lukáš Púček (10) |
| 2025–26 | 4th (IV. liga) | 3/(16) | 30 | 19 | 5 | 6 | 59 | 35 | 62 | Round 3 | | | (Slovakia) Lukáš Púček (16) |

== European competition history ==
| Season | Competition | Round | Country | Club | Home | Away | Aggregate |
|---|---|---|---|---|---|---|---|
| 2003 | Intertoto Cup | 1. Round | (Cyprus) | Olympiakos Nicosia | 3–0 | 4–1 | 7–1 |
| 2003 | Intertoto Cup | 2. Round | (Slovenia) | FC Koper | 2–3 | 1–0 | 3–3(a) |
| 2004 | Intertoto Cup | 1. Round | (Albania) | KF Teuta Durrës | 4–0 | 0–0 | 4–0 |
| 2004 | Intertoto Cup | 2. Round | (Czech Republic) | FC Slovan Liberec | 1–2 | 0–5 | 1–7 |
| 2005 | Intertoto Cup | 1. Round | (Hungary) | Vasas SC | 2–0 | 0–0 | 2–0 |
| 2005 | Intertoto Cup | 2. Round | (Turkey) | B.B. Ankaraspor | 4–0 | 0–1 | 4–1 |
| 2005 | Intertoto Cup | 3. Round | (England) | Newcastle United F.C. | 1–3 | 0–2 | 1–5 |

== Sponsorship ==
| Period | Kit manufacturer | Shirt sponsor |
|---|---|---|
| 1998–2000 | Adidas | ZŤS KERAMETAL |
| 2000–2003 | NIKE | ZŤS |
| 2004–2018 | Joma | none |
| 2018– | Adidas | none |

== Player records ==
=== Most goals ===
| # | Nat. | Name | Goals |
|---|---|---|---|
| 1 | (Slovakia) | Peter Kiška | 43 |
| 2 | (Slovakia) | Marek Kuzma | 37 |
| 3 | (Slovakia) | Michal Filo | 34 |
| 4 | (Slovakia) | Pavol Straka | 33 |
| 5 | (Montenegro) | Miladin Vujošević | 30 |
| 6 | (Slovakia) | Matej Ižvolt | 22 |
| 6 | (Senegal) | Mouhamadou Seye | 22 |
| 8 | (Slovakia) | Juraj Dovičovič | 19 |

Players whose name is listed in bold are still active.

== Current squad ==
Updated 23 May 2023.
Note: Flags indicate national team as defined under FIFA eligibility rules; some limited exceptions apply. Players may hold more than one non-FIFA nationality.

| No. | Pos. | Nation | Player |
|---|---|---|---|
| 1 | GK | SVK | Dusan Pernis |
| 2 | DF | POR | Pedro Caeiro |
| 4 | FW | SVK | Marek Švec (on loan from ViOn Zlaté Moravce) |
| 5 | DF | RUS | Aleksey Shlyakhov |
| 6 | MF | SVK | Michal Matúš |
| 7 | DF | POR | Rodrigo Macedo |
| 8 | FW | ARM | Eduard Bagrintsev |
| 10 | MF | SVK | Frederik Bilovský |
| 11 | MF | SVK | Kristian Urban |
| 12 | DF | SVK | Adam Nomilner |
| 14 | MF | CZE | Ivan Šumilov |
| 15 | FW | NGA | Elvis Isaac |

| No. | Pos. | Nation | Player |
|---|---|---|---|
| 16 | MF | SVK | Nicolas Martinek |
| 18 | DF | SVK | Slavomír Pagáč |
| 19 | DF | SVK | Adam Cyprian |
| 22 | DF | SVK | Erik Kramár |
| 23 | MF | SVK | Martin Adamec |
| 24 | MF | SVK | Ľuboslav Levai |
| 25 | FW | SRB | Matija Babovic |
| 26 | MF | SVK | Matej Rosenberger |
| 30 | GK | SVK | Rastislav Hodál |
| 31 | GK | SVK | Samuel Vavrúš (captain) |
| 47 | MF | UKR | Maksym Rizye |
| — | DF | SVK | Pavol Rešetka |

For recent transfers, see List of Slovak football transfers winter 2022–23.

=== Reserve team ===
- MFK Dubnica B

== Notable players ==
Had international caps for their respective countries. Players whose name is listed in bold represented their countries while playing for MFK.

Past (and present) players who are the subjects of Wikipedia articles can be found here.

- (Slovakia) Marián Bochnovič
- (Slovakia) Peter Doležaj
- (Slovakia) Juraj Dovičovič
- (Slovakia) **Michal Filo**
- (Slovakia) Artur Gajdoš
- (Slovakia) Michal Hanek
- (Slovakia) Dominik Hollý
- (Slovakia) **Michal Jonáš**
- (Czechoslovakia) Ján Kapko
- (Slovakia) **Peter Kiška**
- (Slovakia) Matúš Kmeť
- (Slovakia) Pavel Kováč
- (Slovakia) Samuel Kozlovský
- (Slovakia) Adam Nemec
- (Slovakia) Peter Pekarík
- (Slovakia) Dušan Perniš
- (Slovakia) Peter Petráš
- (Slovakia) **Andrej Porázik**
- (Niger) Siradji Sani
- (Czech Republic) Marek Střeštík
- (Slovakia) Ľubomír Šatka
- (Slovakia) Peter Šinglár
- (Slovakia) Lukáš Tesák
- (Slovakia) Martin Valjent

== Managers ==
- (Slovakia) Antonín Juran (1996–97)
- (Slovakia) Peter Zelenský (1997–98)
- (Slovakia) Anton Dragúň (1998–2000)
- (Slovakia) Jozef Jankech (2000–01)
- (Slovakia) Peter Gergely (2001–02)
- (Slovakia) Stanislav Griga (2002–03)
- (Slovakia) Jozef Jankech (2003–05)
- (Slovakia) Ľubomír Nosický (2005–06)
- (Slovakia) Anton Dragúň (2006–07)
- (Slovakia) Juraj Bútora (2007–08)
- (Slovakia) Peter Gergely (2008)
- (Slovakia) Peter Gergely (2009–11)
- (Slovakia) Peter Nemečkay (2011–12)
- (Slovakia) Peter Gergely (2012–2014)
- (Slovakia) Pavol Kopačka (2015–2016)
- (Slovakia) Juraj Bútora (2014–15)
- (Slovakia) Peter Gergely (2018–19)
- (Slovakia) Peter Jakuš (2020–2022)
- (Northern Ireland) Andy Smith (2022)
- (Czech Republic) Bohumil Páník (2022–2023)
- (Slovakia) Michal Kijačik (2023)
- (Slovakia) Peter Gergely (2023-2024)
- (Slovakia) Marián Zimen (2025-)
