= Ayotunde Ikuepamitan =

Nigerian footballer

Personal information
- Full name: Ayotunde Ezekiel Ikuepamitan
- Date of birth: 14 December 1996 (age 29)
- Place of birth: Ondo City, Nigeria
- Height: 1.96 m (6 ft 5 in)
- Position: Goalkeeper

Team information
- Current team: Trebišov
- Number: 22

Senior career*
Years	Team	Apps	(Gls)
2015–2016	Rijeka II	17	(0)
2015	→ Varaždin (loan)	9	(0)
2016–2019	Rijeka	0	(0)
2016–2017	→ Šibenik (loan)	6	(0)
2019–2020	Primorac Biograd na Moru	13	(0)
2020	NK Vodice	2	(0)
2020–2022	Orion Tip Sereď	4	(0)
2022–2023	Trebišov	13	(0)
2023–2024	TSU Bramberg	14	(0)
2024–	URC Thal/Assling	39	(1)
- * Club domestic league appearances and goals as of 10 November 2025

Ayotunde Ikuepamitan (born 14 December 1996) is a Nigerian footballer who recently played as a goalkeeper for FK Slavoj Trebišov.

== Club career ==
=== ŠKF Sereď ===
Ikuepamitan made his Fortuna Liga debut for ŠKF Sereď against MFK Zemplín Michalovce on 15 May 2021.
