= Matej Ižvolt =

Slovak footballer

Personal information
- Full name: Matej Ižvolt
- Date of birth: 5 June 1986 (age 40)
- Place of birth: Ilava, Czechoslovakia
- Height: 1.78 m (5 ft 10 in)
- Positions: Midfielder; right-back

Team information
- Current team: SC Zöbern
- Number: 12

Youth career
- Dubnica

Senior career*
Years	Team	Apps	(Gls)
2002–2007	ZTS Dubnica	88	(10)
2007–2009	Slovan Bratislava	27	(1)
2009–2010	→ Tatran Prešov (loan)	22	(2)
2010–2012	MFK Dubnica	61	(12)
2012–2015	Piast Gliwice	51	(1)
2015–2016	Frýdek-Místek	24	(3)
2016–2018	Fotbal Třinec	45	(4)
2018	SV Gaflenz	14	(1)
2019–	SC Zöbern		

International career
2007	Slovakia U21		
- * Club domestic league appearances and goals as of 5 June 2024

Matej Ižvolt (born 5 June 1986) is a Slovak footballer who plays for Austrian club SC Zöbern.

== Club career ==
He started his football career in ZTS Dubnica, in June 2007 he signed a 3-year contract with ŠK Slovan Bratislava. He represented Slovakia in the Under-21 categories. Having made 169 appearances in the Slovak First Football League, scoring 17 goals in the process, he moved to Poland to play for Piast Gliwice on a one-year contract in the summer of 2012.

== Honours ==
Slovan Bratislava

- Slovak First Football League: 2008–09
