= Matej Gorelka =

Slovak footballer

Personal information
- Date of birth: 3 April 1989 (age 37)
- Place of birth: Ilava, Czechoslovakia
- Height: 1.86 m (6 ft 1 in)
- Position: Striker

Senior career*
Years	Team	Apps	(Gls)
2010–2012	MFK Dubnica	38	(6)
2013–2015	Borčice		
2015–2021	FK Beluša		
2021–2024	FSG Zöbern		
- * Club domestic league appearances and goals as of 05:40, 24 April 2026 (UTC)

Matej Gorelka (born 3 April 1989) is a Slovak footballer who plays as a striker. He currently plays in the lower leagues of Austrian football.

== Club career ==
Gorelka started his career at the local club FK Spartak Dubnica nad Váhom. He was promoted to the first-team and later debuted when he was 18 years old. Following health problems, he would no longer be able to play for Dubnica. He later transferred to FK Iskra Borčice. He helped the club get promoted to the second tier of Slovak football in 2015.

In 2015, he signed for FK Beluša. He scored a goal in the Púchovsky derby against MŠK Púchov, cut it would only be a consolation for his side as Beluša lost 2–1. In 2026, he was nominated to represent Slovakia in the qualifying rounds of the UEFA Regions’ Cup. In a league match against MFK Topvar Topoľčany, Gorelka scored to increase his team's lead to 2–0 with a header in the 74th minute. He goal later won the Spring goal of the month. He won the 3. Liga with Beluša in 2019.

In 2021, Gorelka transferred to Austrian lower league side, FSG Zöbern. In his second season with the club, he scored 21 goals, becoming top goal scorer of the league that season, and helping his team avoid relegation. He left the club in May 2024 alongside Matej Izvolt, Marek Jastrab and Michal Englman. In 2025, he played for SV Krumau.

== International career ==
In 2010, while playing for Spartak Dubnica, Gorelka was nominated as a back-up for the Slovakia national under-21 football team ahead of a European Under-21 Championship qualification match against Serbia.
