= Peter Gergely =

Slovak footballer (born 1964)

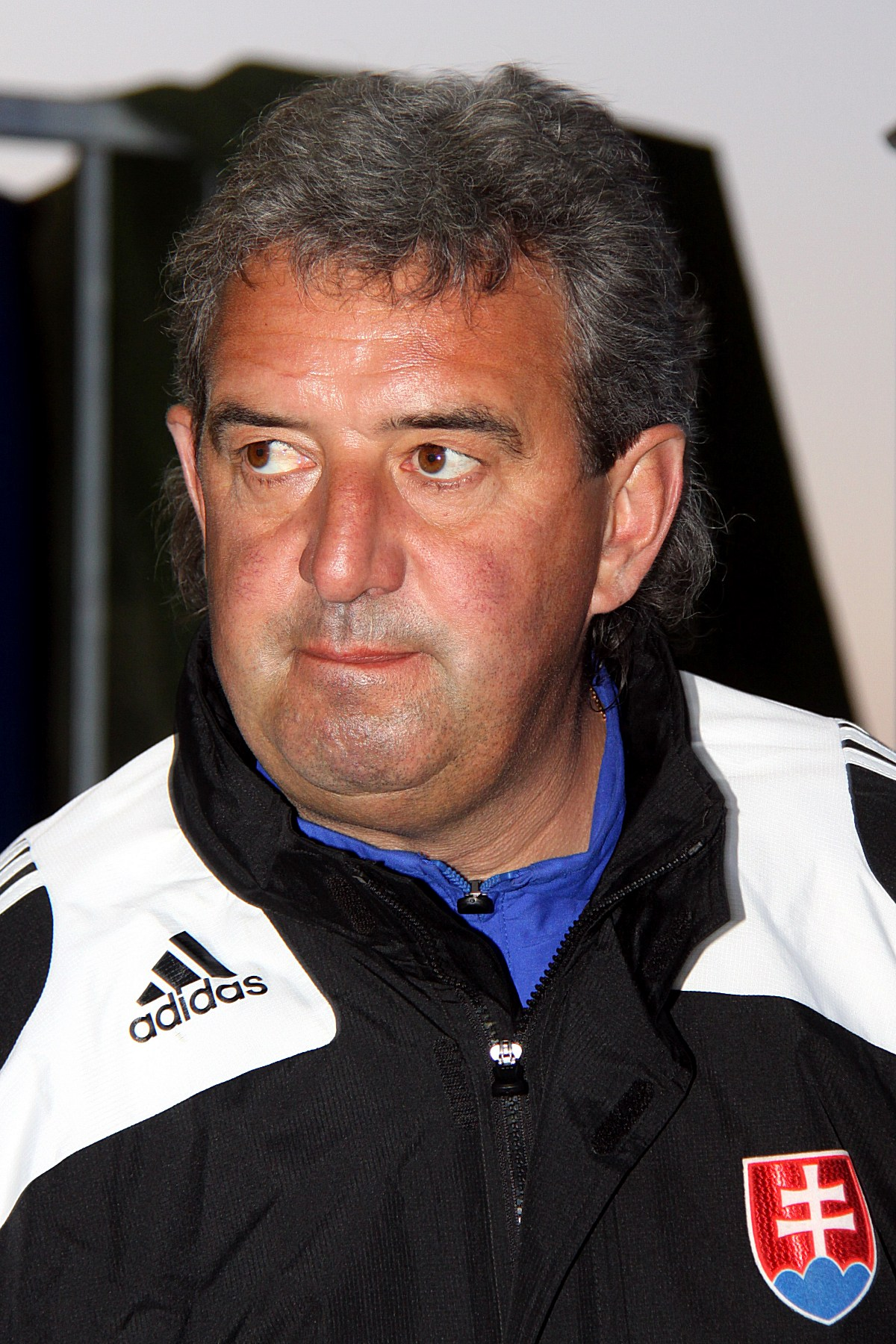
- Gergely in 2012

Personal information
- Date of birth: 23 November 1964 (age 61)
- Place of birth: Czechoslovakia
- Position: Midfielder

Senior career*
Years	Team	Apps	(Gls)
- Žilina
- Nitra
- Vráble
- Sereď
- Petržalka
- Dubnica

Managerial career
- 2001–2002: Dubnica
- 2006–2007: Dubnica
- 2009–2011: Dubnica
- 2011–2012: Slovakia U18
- 2011–2012: Slovakia U19
- 2012–2014: Dubnica
- 2014–2015: Spartak Myjava
- 2015–2016: Slovan Duslo Šaľa
- 2016: Zlaté Moravce
- 2018–2019: Dubnica
- 2020–2022: Dubnica (assistant)
- 2023–2024: Dubnica
- * Club domestic league appearances and goals

Peter Gergely (born 23 November 1964) is a Slovak football coach and former player who most recently was assistant manager of Dubnica. He formerly managed the Slovakia U18 and Slovakia U19 national teams. team.
