= FK Družstevník Plavnica =

Slovak football club

- Full name: FK Družstevník Plavnica
- Founded: 1951
- Ground: Stadium FK Družstevník Plavnica, Plavnica, Slovakia
- Capacity: 1,000 (50 seats)
- Chairman: Ján Solecký
- Manager: Stanislav Hricko
- League: Majstrovstvá regiónu IV. liga Sever, (North)
- 2012–13: IV. liga Sever (North), 1st (promoted)
- Website: http://fkplavnica.webnode.sk/

FK Družstevník Plavnica is a Slovak association football club located in Plavnica. It currently plays in Majstrovstvá regiónu (4th level).

== Colors and badge ==
Its colors are blue and white.
