= Lukáš Laksík =

Slovak footballer

Personal information
- Full name: Lukáš Laksík
- Date of birth: 21 January 1990 (age 36)
- Place of birth: Banská Bystrica, Czechoslovakia
- Height: 1.81 m (5 ft 11 1/2 in)
- Position: Striker

Team information
- Current team: ŠK Badín

Youth career
- Dukla Banská Bystrica

Senior career*
Years	Team	Apps	(Gls)
2008–2010	Dukla Banská Bystrica	11	(0)
2009	→ ŽP Šport Podbrezová (loan)	2	(0)
2011	→ ŽP Šport Podbrezová (loan)	15	(3)
2011–2014	Dukla Banská Bystrica	30	(4)
2013	→ ŽP Šport Podbrezová (loan)	10	(1)
2013–2014	→ Kremnička (loan)		
2015	ASK Kematen		
2015–2017	Kremnička		
2018–2021	Dukla Banská Bystrica	64	(17)
2021–	ŠK Badín	?	(?)
- * Club domestic league appearances and goals as of 7 January 2020

Lukáš Laksík (born 21 January 1990 in Banská Bystrica) is a Slovak football striker who currently plays for semi-professional ŠK Badín.
