= ŠK Milénium Bardejovská Nová Ves =

Slovak football club

- Full name: ŠK Milenium 2000 Bardejovská Nová Ves
- Founded: 1962
- Ground: Futbalový štadión Bardejovská Nová Ves, Bardejovská Nová Ves
- Capacity: 1,000
- Chairman: František Šott
- Manager: František Šott
- League: Slovak Third League
- 2010–11: 1st (promoted from 4.liga east north)

ŠK Milenium 2000 Bardejovská Nová Ves is a Slovak football team, based in borough Bardejovská Nová Ves, of city Bardejov.

== History ==
The club was founded on 25 July 1962. The first chairman was Tomáš Maxin.
