= Stadium FC Petržalka 1898 =

Football stadium in Petržalka, Slovakia

Stadium FC Petržalka akadémia
- Interactive map of Stadium FC Petržalka akadémia
- Location: Petržalka, Slovakia
- Coordinates: 48°07′11″N 17°08′00″E
- Operator: FC Petržalka akadémia
- Capacity: 1,500
- Surface: Artificial turf
- Field size: 105 x 68 m

Construction
- Opened: 2012

Tenant
- FC Petržalka akadémia

Stadium FC Petržalka (Slovak: Štadión FC Petržalka) is a football stadium in Petržalka, Slovakia. It serves as home stadium for football club FC Petržalka. The stadium was built in 2011 and opened in 2012. The first match was played between the home club FC Petržalka 1898 and FC Nitra B, on 5 August 2012, Petržalka loss 1–3.

In the future, the capacity stadium is expected to be increased. During the first years, the stadium had a single grandstand with 800 seats. Later the capacity was increased to 1500 (with 800 seats) and then it was increased to the current capacity of 3000 with 1000 seats.
