= Pomlé Stadium =

Home football stadium in Šamorín, Slovakia

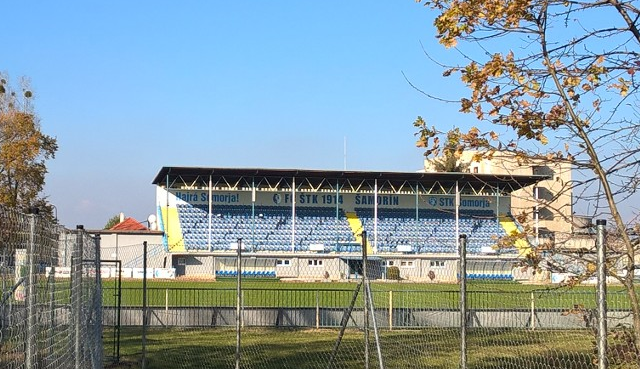
- The stadium in 2016
- Interactive map of Pomlé Stadium
- Location: Šamorín, Slovakia
- Coordinates: 48°01.36′N 17°18.42′E
- Operator: FC ŠTK 1914 Šamorín
- Capacity: 1,950 (750 seats)
- Surface: Grass
- Field size: 105 x 68 m

Construction
- Opened: 1931

Tenant
- FC ŠTK 1914 Šamorín

Pomlé Stadium (Slovak: Štadión Pomlé) is a home football stadium in Šamorín, Slovakia. It serves as home stadium for football club FC ŠTK 1914 Šamorín. The stadium has a capacity of 1,950 of which 750 seats are seated.

== History ==
The facility was built in the 1960s, adjacent to the club's previous pitch, which opened in 1931. In 2016, Šamorín played against Spartak Trnava B, where more than 400 people came to see the game.
