= ŠK LR Crystal Lednické Rovne =

Slovak football club

- Full name: Sport Club LR Crystal Lednické Rovne
- Nickname: Sklári (Glassmakers)
- Ground: Stadium ŠK LR Crystal, Lednické Rovne, Slovakia
- Chairman: Pavol Brnka
- Manager: Dušan Kramlík
- League: 3. Liga
- 2014–15: 3. liga, 15./18
- Website: http://sklrcrystal.sk/

ŠK LR Crystal Lednické Rovne is a Slovak association football club located in Lednické Rovne. It currently plays in 3. Liga.

== Colors and badge ==
Its colors are dark blue.
