= FK Beluša =

Slovak football club

- Full name: FK Beluša
- Founded: 1951
- Ground: Stadium TJ KOVO Beluša, Beluša, Slovakia
- Capacity: 1,200
- Chairman: Miloš Pagáč
- Head coach: Dušan Kramlík
- League: 3. liga
- 2025-26: 3. liga Západ, 6th
- Website: http://www.fkbelusa.sk/sk/

FK Beluša is a Slovak association football club located in Beluša. It currently plays in 3.liga západ.

== Current squad ==
As of 9 June 2019
Note: Flags indicate national team as defined under FIFA eligibility rules; some limited exceptions apply. Players may hold more than one non-FIFA nationality.

No.	Pos.	Nation	Player
3	DF	SVK	Peter Jánošík
7	MF	SVK	Erik Novisedlák

No.	Pos.	Nation	Player
10	FW	SVK	Matej Gorelka (captain)
20	Gk	SVK	Jozef Ciesar

== Colors and badge ==
Its colors are white and blue.
