= 1. FK Svidník =

Slovak football club

1.FK Svidník
- Full name: 1.Futbalový Klub Svidník
- Founded: 1925; 100 years ago
- Ground: Štadión Svidník, Svidník
- Capacity: 2,700
- Chairman: Adrián Labun
- Head coach: Vladislav Palša
- League: 4. Liga
- 2021–22 (East): 11th
- Website: http://fk.svidnik.org/

1.FK Svidník is a Slovak football team, based in the town of Svidník. The club was founded in 1925. The club currently played in the 4. Liga.

== History ==
In August 2015, club announced merger within one year with ŠK Futura Humenné.

== Clubname history ==
- OZKN Dekoplas 1991–1992
- ŠK Surmex 1992–1993
- MFK Dukla 1995–1996
- Svidnícky FK 1999–2000
- FK Drustav Svidník 2002–2015
- ŠK Futura Svidník 2015–2016
- 1.FK Svidník 2016–present
