= FKM Nové Zámky =

Slovak football club

- Full name: FKM Nové Zámky
- Founded: 1907; 119 years ago
- Ground: Ladislav Ganczner Stadium, Nové Zámky
- Capacity: 5,000
- Chairman: Otokar Klein
- Head coach: Marián Süttö
- League: 3. liga
- 2025-26: 4th
- Website: http://www.fkmnovezamky.sk
Home colours	Away colours

FKM Nové Zámky is a Slovak football team, based in the town of Nové Zámky. The club was founded in 1907.

In 2019, the club put their stadium up for sale due to financial reasons.

== Historic names ==
  - 1907 – Érsekújvári SE(Érsekújvári Sport Egylet)
  - 1941 – Érsekújvári SE-Cikta(Érsekújvári Sport Egylet-Cikta)
  - 1943 – MOVE Érsekújvári SE(Magyar Országos Véderő Egylet Érsekújvári Sport Egylet)
  - 1945 – Érsekújvári SE(Érsekújvári Sport Egylet)
  - TJ Slovan Nové Zámky (Telovýchovná jednota Slovan Nové Zámky)
  - TJ Elektrosvit Nové Zámky (Telovýchovná jednota Elektrosvit Nové Zámky)
  - FKM Nové Zámky (Futbalový klub mesta Nové Zámky)
