= Dubnica nad Váhom =

- Municipality
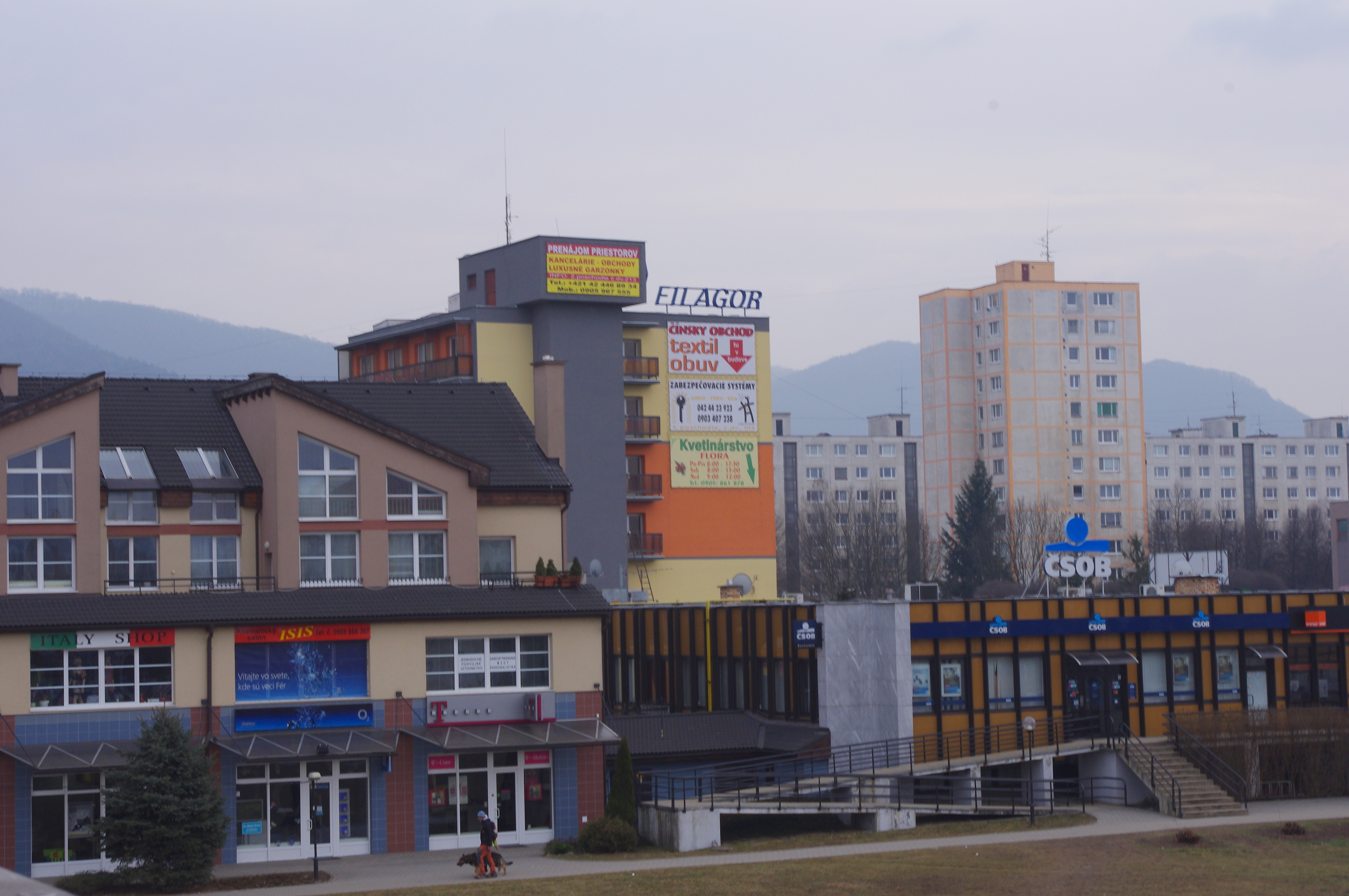

- Flag Coat of arms

- Location of Dubnica nad Váhom in the Trenčín Region Location of Dubnica nad Váhom in Slovakia
- Coordinates: 48.96°N 18.17°E
- Country: Slovakia
- Region: Trenčín Region
- District: Ilava District
- First mentioned: 1193

Government
  - Mayor: Peter Wolf

Area
  - Total: 49.13 km^{2} (18.97 sq mi)
- Elevation: 253 m (830 ft)

Population (2025)
  - Total: 21,356
- Time zone: UTC+1 (CET)
  - Summer (DST): UTC+2 (CEST)
- Postal code: 184 1
- Area code: +421 42
- Vehicle registration plate (until 2022): IL
- Website: www.dubnica.eu

Dubnica nad Váhom (Slovak before 1927: Dubnica, German: Dubnitz an der Waag, Hungarian: Máriatölgyes, before 1899 Dubnic(z)) is a town in the Ilava District, Trenčín Region in Slovakia.

== Geography ==
The municipality lies at an altitude of 253 metres (830 ft) and covers an area of 49.13 km^{2} (18.97 sq mi) (2025).

It is located on the Váh river, in the Ilava Basin, between the White Carpathians and Strážovské vrchy mountains, at an altitude of 242 metres. The town's cadastral area is composed of Dubnica and "city part" Prejta, annexed in 1973.

== History ==
Traces of settlement in the place of today's town are from the Stone Age. The first written mention about Dubnica nad Váhom was in 1193 as Dubnicza. Sometime in the 15th century the village passed to the rule of the Trenčín Castle. After incorporation into Czechoslovakia, construction of a munition factory was negotiated in 1928 and built in 1936.

During the Second World War, a Roma concentration camp was set up in the town. At its height, the camp housed more than 700 Roma prisoners, most of whom had been used as slave labor in the nearby factory and to build a dam on the River Vah. During January 1945 several inmates and one guard fell ill with typhus. On February 23, 1945 the inmates were taken out and murdered to stop the spread of Typhus. This was among the largest killing of Roma in Slovakia during the war.

During the Communist Czechoslovakia, it was one of the biggest arms producers in the whole country. After the Velvet Revolution in 1989, the factory was shut down and only fragments are left now.

== Population ==
Historical population
Year	Pop.	±%
1970	9,941	—
1980	15,580	+56.7%
1991	24,446	+56.9%
2001	25,995	+6.3%
2011	25,305	−2.7%
2021	22,595	−10.7%
Source: Censuses

Population statistic (10 years)
Year	1995	2005	2015	2025
Count	26,168	25,590	24,497	21,356
Difference		−2.20%	−4.27%	−12.82%

Population statistic
Year	2024	2025
Count	21,732	21,356
Difference		−1.73%

It has a population of 21,356 people (31 December 2025).

=== Ethnicity ===
Census 2021 (1+ %)
Ethnicity	Number	Fraction
Slovak	20,967	92.79%
Not found out	1430	6.32%
Czech	289	1.27%
Total	22,595	

In year 2021 was 22,595 people by ethnicity 20,967 as Slovak, 1430 as Not found out, 289 as Czech, 63 as Other, 38 as Hungarian, 33 as Romani, 30 as Russian, 24 as German, 22 as Polish, 19 as Ukrainian, 19 as Moravian, 13 as Bulgarian, 12 as Italian, 12 as Rusyn, 7 as Vietnamese, 7 as Canadian, 6 as Korean, 5 as English, 4 as Serbian, 4 as Austrian, 4 as Iranian, 4 as French, 3 as Jewish, 2 as Chinese, 2 as Irish, 2 as Greek, 2 as Croatian, 2 as Albanian and 1 as Romanian.

Note on population: The difference values of population numbers in the table "Population statistic" and in the sections "Ethnicity" & "Religion" is caused by the use of various statistical methods.

=== Religion ===
Census 2021 (1+ %)
Religion	Number	Fraction
Roman Catholic Church	13,204	58.44%
None	6422	28.42%
Not found out	1949	8.63%
Evangelical Church	384	1.7%
Total	22,595	

In year 2021 was 22,595 people by religion 13,204 from Roman Catholic Church, 6422 from None, 1949 from Not found out, 384 from Evangelical Church, 96 from Other, 95 from Greek Catholic Church, 91 from Ad hoc movements, 83 from Christian Congregations in Slovakia, 49 from Apostolic Church, 37 from Other and not ascertained christian church, 37 from Buddhism, 35 from Jehovah's Witnesses, 28 from Calvinist Church, 25 from Eastern Orthodox Church, 19 from Islam, 14 from Paganism and natural spirituality, 6 from United Methodist Church, 5 from Church of Jesus Christ of Latter-day Saints, 3 from Hinduism, 3 from Czechoslovak Hussite Church, 2 from Jewish community, 2 from Church of the Brethren, 2 from Seventh-day Adventist Church, 1 from Old Catholic Church, 1 from New Apostolic Church, 1 from Baptists Church and 1 from Bahá'i Community.

== Notable people ==
- Pavol Demitra (1974-2011), ice hockey player
- Rudolf Hrubý (1954-2023), businessman
- Tomáš Tatar (born 1990), ice hockey player
- Martin Valjent (born 1995), footballer

== Twin towns — sister cities ==
Dubnica nad Váhom is twinned with:

- Vác, Hungary
- Zawadzkie, Poland
- Otrokovice, Czech Republic
- Yaroslavl, Russia

== See also ==
- FK ZTS Dubnica
- List of municipalities and towns in Slovakia

== Genealogical resources ==
The records for genealogical research are available at the state archive "Statny Archiv in Bratislava, Bytca, Slovakia"

- Roman Catholic church records (births/marriages/deaths): 1667-1895 (parish A)
- Lutheran church records (births/marriages/deaths): 1783-1895 (parish B)
