= ŠK Odeva Lipany =

Slovak football club

- Full name: Športový Klub Odeva Lipany
- Founded: 1925; 101 years ago
- Ground: Štadión ŠK Odeva, Lipany
- Capacity: 5,000
- President: Peter Križalkovič
- Head coach: Štefan Jacko
- League: 3.liga
- 2025–26: 3. liga, 4th
- Website: https://skodevalipany.sk/
Home colours	Away colours

ŠK Odeva Lipany is a Slovak football club, playing in the town of Lipany.

== History ==
- 1925 Club Founded
- 1929 Renamed ŠK Lipany
- 1937 Renamed ŠK Slávia Lipany
- 1946 Renamed ŠK Sokol Lipany
- 1960 Renamed TJ Odeva Lipany
- 1990 Renamed FK Odeva Lipany
- 1994 Renamed FK Odeva Dukla Lipany
- Renamed ŠK Odeva Lipany

== Notable players ==
Had international caps for their respective countries. Players whose name is listed in bold represented their countries while playing for ŠK.

- (Slovakia) Miroslav Drobňák
- (Slovakia) Martin Jakubko
- (Slovakia) Ján Krivák
- (Slovakia) Stanislav Varga
- (Slovakia) Adam Zreľák
