= List of Slovak football transfers summer 2019 =

Notable Slovak football transfers in the summer transfer window 2019 by club. Only transfers of the Fortuna Liga and 2. liga are included.

== Fortuna Liga ==
=== ŠK Slovan Bratislava ===
In: Note: Flags indicate national team as defined under FIFA eligibility rules; some limited exceptions apply. Players may hold more than one non-FIFA nationality.

No.	Pos.	Nation	Player
—	GK	SVK	Matúš Ružinský (loan return from FC ŠTK Fluminense Šamorín)
—	DF	NED	Myenty Abena (from FC Spartak Trnava)
—	DF	ARG	Vernon de Marco (loan return from (Poland) Lech Poznań)
—	DF	SVK	Samuel Kozlovský (loan return from FC Petržalka)
—	MF	CZE	Erik Daniel (from MFK Ružomberok)
—	FW	GRE	Georgios Tzovaras (from (Greece) PAOK FC)

Out: Note: Flags indicate national team as defined under FIFA eligibility rules; some limited exceptions apply. Players may hold more than one non-FIFA nationality.

No.	Pos.	Nation	Player
—	DF	AUT	Stefan Stangl (Released)
—	FW	SVK	Róbert Vittek (End of professional career)
—	FW	SVK	David Hrnčár (on loan to FK Pohronie)
—	FW	MNE	Boris Cmiljanić (on loan to (Austria) Admira)

=== FC DAC 1904 Dunajská Streda ===
In: Note: Flags indicate national team as defined under FIFA eligibility rules; some limited exceptions apply. Players may hold more than one non-FIFA nationality.

No.	Pos.	Nation	Player
—	DF	UKR	Danylo Beskorovainyi (loan return from MFK Zemplín Michalovce)
—	FW	SVK	Jakub Švec (from FC ViOn Zlaté Moravce)
—	DF	SVK	Dominik Kružliak (from MFK Ružomberok)
—	DF	SVK	Matej Oravec (from FK Železiarne Podbrezová)
—	FW	VEN	Eric Ramirez (from (Czech Republic) MFK Karviná)
—	MF	SVK	Andrej Fábry (on loan from (Czech Republic) FK Jablonec)

Out: Note: Flags indicate national team as defined under FIFA eligibility rules; some limited exceptions apply. Players may hold more than one non-FIFA nationality.

No.	Pos.	Nation	Player
—	MF	SVK	Christián Herc (loan return to (England) Wolverhampton)
—	GK	CZE	Patrik Macej (Released)
—	FW	CZE	Karsten Ayong (Released)
—	MF	SVK	Denis Baumgartner (loan return to (Italy) Sampdoria)
—	GK	POL	Tomasz Kucz (loan return to (Germany) Bayer 04 Leverkusen)
—	FW	UKR	Maksym Tretyakov (on loan to (Ukraine) FC Oleksandriya)
—	DF	SVK	Tomáš Huk (to (Poland) Piast Gliwice)
—	DF	SVK	Ľubomír Šatka (to (Poland) Lech Poznań)
—	FW	SVK	Jakub Švec (on loan to FC ViOn Zlaté Moravce)

=== MFK Ružomberok ===
In: Note: Flags indicate national team as defined under FIFA eligibility rules; some limited exceptions apply. Players may hold more than one non-FIFA nationality.

No.	Pos.	Nation	Player
—	MF	SVK	Martin Regáli (from Free agent)
—	DF	SVK	Alexander Mojžiš (from FK Železiarne Podbrezová)
—	MF	SVK	Peter Ďungel (on loan from (Poland) Stal Mielec)
—	MF	CZE	Filip Hašek (on loan from (Czech Republic) Bohemians 1905)
—	FW	CZE	Ondřej Novotný (on loan from (Czech Republic) AC Sparta Prague)

Out: Note: Flags indicate national team as defined under FIFA eligibility rules; some limited exceptions apply. Players may hold more than one non-FIFA nationality.

No.	Pos.	Nation	Player
—	FW	BIH	Izzy Tandir (Released and joined (Czech Republic) SK Sigma Olomouc)
—	MF	CZE	Erik Daniel (to ŠK Slovan Bratislava)
—	MF	BIH	Zinedin Mustedanagić (loan return to (Czech Republic) AC Sparta Prague)
—	MF	CZE	Jan Čtvrtečka (Released)
—	DF	SVK	Dominik Kružliak (to Dunajská Streda)
—	MF	SVK	Peter Gál-Andrezly (to (Romania) Sepsi OSK)

=== MŠK Žilina ===
In: Note: Flags indicate national team as defined under FIFA eligibility rules; some limited exceptions apply. Players may hold more than one non-FIFA nationality.

No.	Pos.	Nation	Player
—	MF	SVK	Michal Tomič (from (Italy) Sampdoria)
—	DF	ALB	Besir Demiri (from (Ukraine) FC Mariupol)
—	MF	RUS	Vladimir Filippov (from (Russia) PFC Spartak Nalchik)
—	MF	SVK	Jakub Paur (from AS Trenčín)
—	DF	POL	Jakub Piotr Kiwior (from FK Železiarne Podbrezová)

Out: Note: Flags indicate national team as defined under FIFA eligibility rules; some limited exceptions apply. Players may hold more than one non-FIFA nationality.

No.	Pos.	Nation	Player
—	MF	SVK	Jakub Holúbek (to (Poland) Piast Gliwice)
—	MF	SVK	Jaroslav Mihalík (loan return to (Poland) KS Cracovia)
—	MF	SVK	Michal Škvarka (to (Hungary) Ferencvárosi)
—	MF	SVK	Martin Gamboš (on loan to FC Spartak Trnava)

=== MFK Zemplín Michalovce ===
In: Note: Flags indicate national team as defined under FIFA eligibility rules; some limited exceptions apply. Players may hold more than one non-FIFA nationality.

No.	Pos.	Nation	Player
—	MF	SVK	Patrik Chovan (from FK Senica youth)
—	MF	GRE	Dimitris Popovits (from (Germany) Viktoria Köln)
—	FW	BRA	Palmyere (from (United States) Boston City FC)
—	DF	UKR	Vadym Chervak (on loan from (Czech Republic) AC Sparta Prague)
—	DF	TUR	Emre Bekir (on loan from (Turkey) Alanyaspor)
—	MF	GRE	Kyriakos Savvidis (from (Greece) Aris)
—	FW	NIG	Issa Modibo Sidibé (from (France) FC Mulhouse)
—	MF	ESP	Pedrito (from (Spain) UD Logroñés)
—	DF	ESP	Ian Pino Soler (from Free agent)
—	FW	PAN	Josué Luna (on loan from (Panama) Costa del Este F.C.)
—	FW	SVK	Milan Kvocera (on loan from AS Trenčín)

Out: Note: Flags indicate national team as defined under FIFA eligibility rules; some limited exceptions apply. Players may hold more than one non-FIFA nationality.

No.	Pos.	Nation	Player
—	FW	SVK	Martin Regáli (End of contract)
—	DF	UKR	Danylo Beskorovainyi (loan return to FC DAC 1904 Dunajská Streda)
—	FW	GHA	Sadam Sulley (loan return to (Poland) Legia Warsaw)
—	FW	ESP	Mamadou Tounkara (loan return to (Italy) Lazio)
—	GK	POL	Gerard Bieszczad (Released and joined (Poland) Stal Rzeszów)
—	MF	ESP	José Casado (Released)
—	DF	SVK	Dominik Špiriak (loan return to FC DAC 1904 Dunajská Streda)
—	FW	SVK	Roland Černák (loan return to FC DAC 1904 Dunajská Streda)
—	FW	UKR	Yuriy Zakharkiv (Released)
—	DF	VEN	Alejandro Mitrano (Released)

=== ŠKF Sereď ===
In: Note: Flags indicate national team as defined under FIFA eligibility rules; some limited exceptions apply. Players may hold more than one non-FIFA nationality.

No.	Pos.	Nation	Player
—	DF	SRB	Nikola Unković (from (Serbia) FK Stepojevac Vaga)
—	GK	MKD	Dejan Iliev (on loan from (England) Arsenal F.C.)
—	DF	SVK	Martin Slaninka (from (Czech Republic) 1. SK Prostějov)
—	GK	SVK	Radovan Hodál (from MŠK Slovan Trenčianske Teplice)
—	MF	CRO	Roko Jureškin (from (Croatia) Hajduk Split)
—	MF	BRA	Cléber Nascimento da Silva (from FC ViOn Zlaté Moravce)
—	MF	SVK	Kristián Lukáčik (from FK Železiarne Podbrezová)
—	MF	CZE	Miroslav Tureček (from (Czech Republic) FC Fastav Zlín)
—	MF	BRA	Matheus Olavo (on loan from (Brazil) Londrina)
—	MF	NGR	Solomon Omale (from (Nigeria) Sokoto United)
—	FW	NGR	Christian Attah Junior (from (Nigeria) Galadima Football Academy)
—	FW	CYP	Panagiotis Louka (on loan from (Italy) Atalanta)
—	MF	SLO	Maj Rorič (on loan from (Italy) Internazionale)
—	DF	BRA	Bruno Dip (on loan from (Brazil) São Paulo B)

Out: Note: Flags indicate national team as defined under FIFA eligibility rules; some limited exceptions apply. Players may hold more than one non-FIFA nationality.

No.	Pos.	Nation	Player
—	FW	TTO	Kathon St. Hillaire (Released)
—	FW	FRA	Ondong Mba (Released)
—	DF	SVK	Róbert Richnák (to FC Petržalka)
—	GK	NGR	David Samuel Nwolokor (loan return to (Croatia) HNK Rijeka)
—	DF	SVK	Jozef Menich (to FC Spartak Trnava)
—	FW	SVK	Marek Kuzma (on loan to FK Dubnica)
—	DF	SVK	Matej Dybala (loan return to MŠK Žilina)
—	MF	SVK	Rudolf Bilas (End of contract)
—	FW	SVK	Miloš Lačný (Released)
—	DF	CZE	Martin Sus (Released)
—	DF	SVK	Ľubomír Michalík (Released)

=== FC Spartak Trnava ===
In: Note: Flags indicate national team as defined under FIFA eligibility rules; some limited exceptions apply. Players may hold more than one non-FIFA nationality.

No.	Pos.	Nation	Player
—	GK	SVK	Peter Urminský (loan return from AS Trenčín)
—	FW	CRO	Filip Dangubić (loan return from FK Senica)
—	MF	SVK	Lukáš Mihálik (loan return from FC Lokomotíva Košice)
—	MF	SVK	Matej Jakúbek (from FK Dubnica)
—	MF	CRO	Marko Tešija (from FK Senica)
—	DF	ROU	Bogdan Mitrea (from (Cyprus) Doxa Katokopias FC)
—	DF	SRB	Marko Marinković (from (Serbia) FK Napredak Kruševac)
—	MF	SVK	Filip Oršula (from (Czech Republic) FC Slovan Liberec)
—	FW	AUT	Alex Sobczyk (from (Austria) Rapid Wien II)
—	FW	SVK	Marko Kelemen (from FC DAC 1904 Dunajská Streda)
—	DF	SVK	Jozef Menich (from ŠKF Sereď)
—	MF	BIH	Emir Halilović (from (Bosnia and Herzegovina) FK Sarajevo)
—	DF	SVK	Timotej Záhumenský (on loan from FC DAC 1904 Dunajská Streda)
—	DF	POR	João Diogo (from (Romania) FC Farul Constanța)
—	FW	CUW	Gino van Kessel (from (Belgium) Roeselare)
—	MF	SVK	Martin Gamboš (on loan from MŠK Žilina)

Out: Note: Flags indicate national team as defined under FIFA eligibility rules; some limited exceptions apply. Players may hold more than one non-FIFA nationality.

No.	Pos.	Nation	Player
—	DF	CZE	Václav Dudl (loan return to (Czech Republic) AC Sparta Prague)
—	MF	CZE	Jiří Kulhánek (loan return to (Czech Republic) AC Sparta Prague)
—	MF	CZE	Jakub Rada (loan return to (Czech Republic) FK Mladá Boleslav)
—	MF	POL	Patryk Małecki (loan return to (Poland) Wisła Kraków)
—	MF	MKD	Kire Markoski (loan return to (Cyprus) AEL Limassol)
—	DF	NED	Myenty Abena (end of contract and joined ŠK Slovan Bratislava)
—	DF	SVK	Marek Janečka (to (Czech Republic) MFK Karviná)
—	DF	SVK	Matúš Čonka (to (Czech Republic) MFK Karviná)
—	MF	SVK	Štefan Pekár (end of contract and joined Spartak Myjava)
—	FW	SVK	David Depetris (end of contract and joined AS Trenčín)
—	DF	SVK	Tomáš Košút (end of contract and joined FK Senica)
—	DF	USA	Macario Hing-Glover (released and joined (Finland) HIFK Fotboll)
—	MF	NGR	Musefiu Ashiru (end of contract and joined (Slovenia) NK Drava Ptuj)
—	MF	AUT	Fabian Miesenböck (end of contract and joined (Austria) SV Mattersburg)
—	MF	SVK	Anton Sloboda (end of contract and joined FC ViOn Zlaté Moravce)
—	MF	SVK	Tomáš Brigant (end of contract)
—	FW	SVK	Andrej Lovás (end of contract)
—	MF	SVK	Lukáš Mihálik (to FK Slavoj Trebišov)
—	DF	SVK	Gergely Tumma (on loan to FC Košice)
—	MF	CUW	Gino van Kessel (on loan to AS Trenčín)

=== FK Senica ===
In: Note: Flags indicate national team as defined under FIFA eligibility rules; some limited exceptions apply. Players may hold more than one non-FIFA nationality.

No.	Pos.	Nation	Player
—	DF	SVK	Tomáš Košút (from FC Spartak Trnava)
—	MF	CMR	Joss Didiba (from (Italy) ASD Troina Calcio)
—	MF	SVK	Denis Baumgartner (from (Italy) Sampdoria)
—	MF	CRO	Lovro Cvek (from (Slovenia) NK Celje)
—	MF	VEN	Luis Ramírez (on loan from (Venezuela) Estudiantes de Caracas)
—	FW	GHA	Sadam Sulley (from (Poland) Legia Warsaw)
—	FW	NGR	Eneji Moses (from (Nigeria) GBS Academy)
—	MF	NGR	Tenton Yenne (from (Nigeria) GBS Academy)
-	MF	BRA	Madison (on loan from (Brazil) Goiás)
—	DF	BRA	João Francisco (from Free agent)
—	DF	BRA	Gustavo Cascardo (on loan from (Brazil) Athl. Paranaense)
—	FW	NGR	Samson Olanrewaju Akinyoola (from (Nigeria) 36 Lions Lagos)

Out: Note: Flags indicate national team as defined under FIFA eligibility rules; some limited exceptions apply. Players may hold more than one non-FIFA nationality.

No.	Pos.	Nation	Player
—	FW	SVK	Dominik Martišiak (to (Czech Republic) FC Baník Ostrava)
—	MF	CRO	Marko Tešija (to FC Spartak Trnava)
—	FW	CRO	Filip Dangubić (loan return to FC Spartak Trnava)
—	FW	VEN	Eric Ramirez (loan return to (Czech Republic) MFK Karviná)
—	DF	CPV	Kay (to (Romania) FC Universitatea Cluj)
—	FW	BEN	Désiré Segbé Azankpo (to (England) Oldham Athletic)
—	DF	GHA	Patrick Asmah (loan return to (Italy) Atalanta)
—	GK	CZE	Vojtěch Vorel (loan return to (Czech Republic) AC Sparta Prague)
—	FW	JAM	Kevaughn Atkinson (loan return to (Malta) St. Andrews)
—	DF	FRA	Gabriel Dubois (Released)
—	DF	COL	Joan Herrera (Released)
—	MF	FRA	Sacha Petshi (Released)
—	MF	GBS	Zezinho (Released and joined (Saudi Arabia) Damac FC)
—	DF	CRO	Stjepan Vuković (Released)
—	MF	SVK	Matej Kosorín (Released)
—	GK	SVK	Adam Kováč (Released)
—	MF	SVK	Patrik Chovan (to MFK Zemplín Michalovce)
—	MF	BRA	Jean Deretti (Released and joined (Romania) FC Academica Clinceni)
—	DF	SVK	Erik Otrísal (to FK Železiarne Podbrezová)

=== FC Nitra ===
In: Note: Flags indicate national team as defined under FIFA eligibility rules; some limited exceptions apply. Players may hold more than one non-FIFA nationality.

No.	Pos.	Nation	Player
—	GK	SVK	Martin Kuciak (from (Czech Republic) SK Slavia Prague)
—	DF	SVK	Oliver Podhorín (from (Austria) SC Wiener Neustadt)
—	FW	MKD	Milan Ristovski (on loan from (Croatia) HNK Rijeka)
—	DF	SVK	Daniel Magda (on loan from FK Železiarne Podbrezová)
—	DF	SVK	Ondrej Elexa (from FC Nitra youth)
—	MF	SVK	Viktor Remeň (from FC Nitra youth)
—	FW	SVK	Jakub Tancík (from FC Nitra youth)
—	DF	KAZ	Midat Galbayev (from Free agent)
—	MF	SVK	Michal Faško (from (Switzerland) Grasshopper)
—	MF	SVK	Samuel Šefčík (from (Czech Republic) FC Vysočina Jihlava)

Out: Note: Flags indicate national team as defined under FIFA eligibility rules; some limited exceptions apply. Players may hold more than one non-FIFA nationality.

No.	Pos.	Nation	Player
—	MF	SVK	Tomáš Kóňa (to Spartak Myjava)
—	FW	SVK	Tomáš Vestenický (loan return to (Poland) KS Cracovia)
—	DF	CMR	Macdonald Ngwa Niba (to (Hungary) Honvéd)
—	MF	SVK	Martin Macho (Released)
—	MF	SVK	Ján Chovanec (Released)
—	DF	CRO	Ivan Zgrablić (Released)
—	DF	SVK	Jaroslav Machovec (Released)
—	GK	SVK	Branislav Pindroch (Released)
—	FW	SRB	Nemanja Soković (Released)
—	MF	SVK	Márius Charizopulos (to (Hungary) Győri ETO FC)
—	MF	SVK	Christián Steinhübel (to (Austria) ASK-BSC Bruck/Leitha)
—	DF	SVK	Dominik Straňák (to FK Železiarne Podbrezová)

=== FC ViOn Zlaté Moravce ===
In: Note: Flags indicate national team as defined under FIFA eligibility rules; some limited exceptions apply. Players may hold more than one non-FIFA nationality.

No.	Pos.	Nation	Player
—	MF	SVK	Martin Kovaľ (on loan from MŠK Žilina)
—	DF	SVK	Martin Tóth (from (Poland) Zagłębie Sosnowiec)
—	FW	BRA	Sílvio (from (Albania) KF Vllaznia Shkodër)
—	GK	SVK	Branislav Pindroch (from FC Nitra)
—	MF	SVK	Adam Mihálik (on loan from MŠK Žilina)
—	DF	SVK	Samuel Török (from FC ViOn Zlaté Moravce youth)
—	DF	SVK	Dávid Haspra (from FC ViOn Zlaté Moravce youth)
—	DF	SVK	Ľuboš Janek (from FC ViOn Zlaté Moravce youth)
—	MF	SVK	Samuel Bojnák (from FC ViOn Zlaté Moravce youth)
—	FW	BRA	Gustavo (on loan from (Brazil) Esporte Clube Sao Bernardo)
—	FW	BRA	Murilo (on loan from (Brazil) Esporte Clube Sao Bernardo)
—	FW	SVK	Jakub Švec (on loan from FC DAC 1904 Dunajská Streda)
—	MF	SVK	Anton Sloboda (from FC Spartak Trnava)
—	FW	BIH	Senad Jarović (on loan from (Denmark) SønderjyskE)
—	DF	BRA	Jacy (on loan from (Brazil) Capivariano)

Out: Note: Flags indicate national team as defined under FIFA eligibility rules; some limited exceptions apply. Players may hold more than one non-FIFA nationality.

No.	Pos.	Nation	Player
—	FW	SVK	Jakub Švec (to FC DAC 1904 Dunajská Streda)
—	DF	SVK	Oliver Práznovský (to TBA)
—	MF	SVK	Karol Karlík (to MFK Skalica)
—	FW	CZE	Tomáš Dočekal (to TBA)
—	MF	UKR	Vladyslav Khomutov (to (Estonia) Nõmme Kalju FC)
—	DF	CMR	Noé Kwin (loan return to FC DAC 1904 Dunajská Streda)
—	GK	SVK	Martin Krnáč (to TBA)
—	MF	SVK	Branislav Ľupták (to (Romania) SCM Gloria Buzău)
—	FW	CRO	Krešimir Kelez (to (Croatia) RNK Split)
—	DF	SVK	Marek Beseda (to OFK Malženice)

=== AS Trenčín ===
In: Note: Flags indicate national team as defined under FIFA eligibility rules; some limited exceptions apply. Players may hold more than one non-FIFA nationality.

No.	Pos.	Nation	Player
—	MF	NGR	Issa Adekunle (loan return from FK Inter Bratislava)
—	GK	SVK	Libor Hrdlička (loan return from FK Inter Bratislava)
—	FW	CRO	Antonio Mance (loan return from (France) FC Nantes)
—	DF	SVK	Tomáš Šalata (loan return from FK Inter Bratislava)
—	GK	SVK	Adrián Chovan (loan return from FC ViOn Zlaté Moravce)
—	FW	SVK	Erik Prekop (loan return from FC Petržalka)
—	FW	SVK	David Depetris (from FC Spartak Trnava)
—	MF	NED	Ryan Koolwijk (from (Netherlands) SBV Excelsior)
—	DF	NED	Ruben Ligeon (from (Netherlands) PEC Zwolle)
—	MF	SUR	Ivenzo Comvalius (from (Suriname) Transvaal)
—	MF	BEL	Lenny Buyl (from FK Inter Bratislava youth)
—	GK	SVK	Michal Kukučka (from AS Trenčín youth)
—	MF	SVK	Dávid Machara (from AS Trenčín youth)
—	DF	ESP	John Neeskens (from (United States) Miami FC)
—	MF	CRO	Tomislav Knežević (from (Croatia) Dinamo Zagreb)
—	MF	CUW	Gino van Kessel (on loan from FC Spartak Trnava)
—	DF	ENG	Cole Kpekawa (from (England) Billericay Town)
—	DF	SVK	Richard Križan (from (Hungary) Puskás Akadémia)

Out: Note: Flags indicate national team as defined under FIFA eligibility rules; some limited exceptions apply. Players may hold more than one non-FIFA nationality.

No.	Pos.	Nation	Player
—	MF	SVK	Jakub Paur (End of contract - joined MŠK Žilina)
—	MF	NED	Philippe van Arnhem (Released and joined (Bulgaria) PFC Botev Plovdiv)
5	DF	NGR	Reuben Yem (to (Belgium) K.A.A. Gent)
—	FW	CRO	Antonio Mance (to (Croatia) NK Osijek)
—	FW	SVK	Erik Prekop (to (Czech Republic) FC Hradec Králové)
—	GK	SVK	Libor Hrdlička (to (Czech Republic) MFK Karviná)
—	MF	NED	Joey Sleegers (to (Netherlands) FC Eindhoven)
—	DF	SRB	Erhan Mašović (loan return to (Belgium) Club Brugge KV)
—	DF	SVK	Marián Pišoja (on loan to MŠK Púchov)
—	GK	SVK	Peter Urminský (loan return to FC Spartak Trnava)
—	MF	SVK	Milan Kvocera (Released and joined Michalovce)
10	MF	NED	Desley Ubbink (Released)
—	MF	NGR	Issa Adekunle (Released)
—	MF	SVK	Dávid Machara (on loan to MŠK Púchov)

=== FK Pohronie ===
In: Note: Flags indicate national team as defined under FIFA eligibility rules; some limited exceptions apply. Players may hold more than one non-FIFA nationality.

No.	Pos.	Nation	Player
—	DF	SVK	Marek Bartoš (loan return from FK Železiarne Podbrezová)
—	MF	SVK	Michal Klec (on loan from MŠK Žilina)
—	FW	POL	Mateusz Zachara (from (Poland) Raków Częstochowa)
—	MF	BFA	Cedric Badolo (on loan from (Burkina Faso) Salitas FC)
—	MF	SVK	András Mészáros (from FC DAC 1904 Dunajská Streda)
—	MF	SVK	Peter Mazan (on loan from (Poland) Radomiak Radom)
—	GK	SVK	Martin Vantruba (on loan from (Czech Republic) SK Slavia Prague)
—	FW	SVK	David Hrnčár (on loan from ŠK Slovan Bratislava)
—	DF	KEN	Yusuf Mainge (from (Kenya) A.F.C. Leopards)
TBA	DF	CMR	Michel Meda (from (Cameroon) AS Fortuna)

Out: Note: Flags indicate national team as defined under FIFA eligibility rules; some limited exceptions apply. Players may hold more than one non-FIFA nationality.

No.	Pos.	Nation	Player
—	MF	SVK	Patrik Košuda (on loan to FK Humenné)
—	MF	UKR	Artur Pidruchnyi (Released)
—	GK	SVK	Matej Repiský (Released)
—	MF	SVK	Matúš Antošík (Released)
—	FW	SVK	Peter Voško (loan return to FK Železiarne Podbrezová)
—	FW	SVK	Viktor Vondryska (on loan to FK Železiarne Podbrezová)
—	FW	SRB	Stefan Visić (loan return to ŠK Novohrad Lučenec)

== 2. liga ==
=== FK Železiarne Podbrezová ===
In: Note: Flags indicate national team as defined under FIFA eligibility rules; some limited exceptions apply. Players may hold more than one non-FIFA nationality.

No.	Pos.	Nation	Player
—	FW	SVK	Peter Voško (loan return from FK Pohronie)
—	FW	SVK	Jakub Šulc (from FK Inter Bratislava)
—	MF	SVK	Peter Lipták (from Partizán Bardejov)
—	GK	CZE	Patrik Macej (from FC DAC 1904 Dunajská Streda)
—	FW	SVK	Matúš Marcin (from TJ Sokol Ľubotice)
—	FW	SVK	Viktor Vondryska (on loan from FK Pohronie)
—	DF	SVK	Ján Mizerák (from (Czech Republic) FC Sellier & Bellot Vlašim)
—	DF	SVK	Juraj Chvátal (on loan from (Czech Republic) SK Sigma Olomouc)
—	DF	CZE	Jakub Hric (from FK Poprad)
—	DF	SVK	Dominik Straňák (from FC Veľký Kýr)
—	DF	SVK	Erik Otrísal (from FK Senica)
—	MF	SVK	Martin Pribula (from Free agent)
—	MF	MKD	Kristijan Trapanovski (from (Czech Republic) Slavia Prague II)

Out: Note: Flags indicate national team as defined under FIFA eligibility rules; some limited exceptions apply. Players may hold more than one non-FIFA nationality.

No.	Pos.	Nation	Player
—	FW	SVK	Filip Hlohovský (Released)
—	GK	SVK	Martin Vantruba (loan return to (Czech Republic) SK Slavia Prague)
—	FW	SVK	Filip Halgoš (loan return to (Czech Republic) FK Viktoria Žižkov)
—	DF	SVK	Alexander Mojžiš (to MFK Ružomberok)
—	DF	SVK	Michal Obročník (Released)
—	DF	SVK	Matej Podstavek (Released)
—	DF	SVK	Marek Bartoš (loan return to FK Pohronie)
—	FW	POL	Jakub Więzik (Released)
—	MF	NGR	David Adeniyi Fadairo (loan return to (Nigeria) Lagos Islanders)
—	DF	SVK	Samuel Kuc (to FC Košice)
—	DF	SVK	Matúš Katunský (to FC Košice)
—	DF	SVK	Matej Oravec (to FC DAC 1904 Dunajská Streda)
—	GK	SRB	Marko Drobnjak (to (Serbia) FK Zlatibor Čajetina)
—	DF	POL	Jakub Piotr Kiwior (to MŠK Žilina)
—	FW	SVK	Dávid Leško (to FC Košice)
—	FW	SVK	Daniel Pavúk (on loan to 1. FC Tatran Prešov)

=== FK Poprad ===
In: Note: Flags indicate national team as defined under FIFA eligibility rules; some limited exceptions apply. Players may hold more than one non-FIFA nationality.

No.	Pos.	Nation	Player
—	MF	BRA	Lopez Da Silva Junior (from FK Slavoj Trebišov)
—	FW	SRB	Dragan Andrić (from MFK Tatran Liptovský Mikuláš)
—	MF	SVK	Oliver Luterán (from 1. FC Tatran Prešov)
—	MF	SVK	Stanislav Olejník (from 1. FC Tatran Prešov)
—	MF	UKR	Vadym Yanchak (on loan from FC Lokomotíva Košice)

Out: Note: Flags indicate national team as defined under FIFA eligibility rules; some limited exceptions apply. Players may hold more than one non-FIFA nationality.

No.	Pos.	Nation	Player
—	FW	SVK	Stanislav Šesták (End of professional career)
—	FW	SVK	Štefan Holiš (to MŠK Púchov)
—	DF	SVK	Vladislav Palša (End of professional career)
—	DF	CZE	Jakub Hric (to FK Železiarne Podbrezová)

=== MFK Skalica ===
In: Note: Flags indicate national team as defined under FIFA eligibility rules; some limited exceptions apply. Players may hold more than one non-FIFA nationality.

No.	Pos.	Nation	Player

Out: Note: Flags indicate national team as defined under FIFA eligibility rules; some limited exceptions apply. Players may hold more than one non-FIFA nationality.

No.	Pos.	Nation	Player
—	MF	SRB	Goran Matić (loan return to KFC Komárno)
—	MF	SVK	Martin Kovaľ (loan return to MŠK Žilina)

=== MFK Tatran Liptovský Mikuláš ===
In: Note: Flags indicate national team as defined under FIFA eligibility rules; some limited exceptions apply. Players may hold more than one non-FIFA nationality.

No.	Pos.	Nation	Player
—	DF	SVK	Matej Dybala (on loan from MŠK Žilina)

Out: Note: Flags indicate national team as defined under FIFA eligibility rules; some limited exceptions apply. Players may hold more than one non-FIFA nationality.

No.	Pos.	Nation	Player
—	FW	SRB	Dragan Andrić (to FK Poprad)

=== KFC Komárno ===
In: Note: Flags indicate national team as defined under FIFA eligibility rules; some limited exceptions apply. Players may hold more than one non-FIFA nationality.

No.	Pos.	Nation	Player
—	DF	SVK	Marek Pittner (from FC ŠTK 1914 Šamorín)
—	FW	SRB	Lazar Kniežević (from FTC Fiľakovo)
—	GK	HUN	Balázs Ásványi (on loan from (Hungary) Puskás Akadémia FC)
—	MF	HUN	Zoltán Varjas (on loan from (Hungary) Mezőkövesdi SE)
—	MF	CZE	Matěj Končal (from (Czech Republic) MFK Vítkovice)
—	DF	SVK	Martin Šimko (from FC DAC 1904 Dunajská Streda)
—	MF	SVK	Marek Rigo (from ŠK Slovan Bratislava)
—	FW	SVK	Ján Holík (on loan from FC DAC 1904 Dunajská Streda)
—	DF	SVK	Jakub Krela (from MŠK Žilina)
—	FW	CMR	Christian Emmanuel Nguidjol Bayemi (from (Cameroon) Eding Sport FC)
—	DF	SVK	Kornel Saláta (from Free agent)

Out: Note: Flags indicate national team as defined under FIFA eligibility rules; some limited exceptions apply. Players may hold more than one non-FIFA nationality.

No.	Pos.	Nation	Player
—	MF	SVK	Daniel Valach (to TBA)
—	MF	SVK	Kristóf Domonkos (to (Hungary) Győri ETO FC)
—	FW	SRB	Samir Nurković (to (South Africa) Kaizer Chiefs F.C.)
—	MF	SVK	András Mészáros (loan return to FC DAC 1904 Dunajská Streda)
—	DF	SVK	Šimon Kupec (loan return to MFK Ružomberok)

=== FK Dubnica ===
In: Note: Flags indicate national team as defined under FIFA eligibility rules; some limited exceptions apply. Players may hold more than one non-FIFA nationality.

No.	Pos.	Nation	Player
—	FW	SVK	Marek Kuzma (on loan from ŠKF Sereď)

Out: Note: Flags indicate national team as defined under FIFA eligibility rules; some limited exceptions apply. Players may hold more than one non-FIFA nationality.

No.	Pos.	Nation	Player
—	MF	SVK	Matej Jakúbek (to FC Spartak Trnava)
—	FW	SVK	Rajmund Mikuš (to (Czech Republic) FC Vysočina Jihlava)

=== FC Petržalka ===
In: Note: Flags indicate national team as defined under FIFA eligibility rules; some limited exceptions apply. Players may hold more than one non-FIFA nationality.

No.	Pos.	Nation	Player
—	FW	SVK	Ladislav Almási (on loan from FC DAC 1904 Dunajská Streda)
—	DF	SVK	Šimon Kupec (from MFK Ružomberok)
—	MF	SVK	Róbert Richnák (from ŠKF Sereď)
—	MF	SVK	Richard Lásik (from Free agent)
—	MF	SVK	Marcel Oravec (from (Austria) SC Neusiedl am See 1919)
—	DF	NZL	Jesse Edge (on loan from FK Železiarne Podbrezová)
—	MF	SVK	Tomáš Nagy (from (Czech Republic) FC Baník Ostrava youth)
1	GK	SVK	Ľuboš Kamenár (from Free agent)
29	DF	SVK	Kristián Kolčák (from Free agent)

Out: Note: Flags indicate national team as defined under FIFA eligibility rules; some limited exceptions apply. Players may hold more than one non-FIFA nationality.

No.	Pos.	Nation	Player
—	FW	SVK	Erik Prekop (loan return to AS Trenčín)
—	MF	SVK	Martin Vician (Released)
—	FW	SVK	Jozef Sombat (to (Austria) TBA)

=== NLF Partizán Bardejov ===
In: Note: Flags indicate national team as defined under FIFA eligibility rules; some limited exceptions apply. Players may hold more than one non-FIFA nationality.

No.	Pos.	Nation	Player
—	MF	SVK	Patrik Košuda (on loan from FK Pohronie)
—	DF	SVK	Miroslav Petko (from FC Lokomotíva Košice)
—	MF	SVK	Filip Maník (from 1. FC Tatran Prešov)
—	MF	SVK	Adrián Leško (from FC Lokomotíva Košice)
—	DF	SVK	Miroslav Keresteš (from 1. FC Tatran Prešov)
—	FW	SVK	Peter Voško (on loan from FK Železiarne Podbrezová)

Out: Note: Flags indicate national team as defined under FIFA eligibility rules; some limited exceptions apply. Players may hold more than one non-FIFA nationality.

No.	Pos.	Nation	Player
—	DF	SVK	Ľubomír Korijkov (Released)
—	MF	SVK	Michal Horodník (Released)
—	FW	CZE	Jan Staško (Released)
—	MF	SVK	Peter Lipták (to FK Železiarne Podbrezová)

=== FC ŠTK 1914 Šamorín ===
In: Note: Flags indicate national team as defined under FIFA eligibility rules; some limited exceptions apply. Players may hold more than one non-FIFA nationality.

No.	Pos.	Nation	Player
—	MF	UKR	Artur Pidruchnyi (from FK Pohronie)

Out: Note: Flags indicate national team as defined under FIFA eligibility rules; some limited exceptions apply. Players may hold more than one non-FIFA nationality.

No.	Pos.	Nation	Player
—	GK	SVK	Matúš Ružinský (loan return to ŠK Slovan Bratislava)
—	DF	BRA	Diogo (Released)
—	MF	BRA	Luquinhas (Released)
—	FW	BRA	Capixaba (Released)
—	FW	BRA	Peu (to (Portugal) C.D. Aves)
—	MF	SVK	Adrián Kopičár (Released)
—	DF	SVK	Marián Štrbák (Released)
—	DF	SVK	Daniel Magda (Released)
—	MF	SVK	Mário Almaský (Released)
—	DF	SVK	Marek Pittner (Released)
—	FW	SVK	Ladislav Almási (loan return to FC DAC 1904 Dunajská Streda)

=== FK Slavoj Trebišov ===
In: Note: Flags indicate national team as defined under FIFA eligibility rules; some limited exceptions apply. Players may hold more than one non-FIFA nationality.

No.	Pos.	Nation	Player
—	MF	SVK	Tomáš Ilinjo (from FC Lokomotíva Košice)
—	DF	SVK	Ľubomír Korijkov (from Partizán Bardejov)
—	DF	SVK	Róbert Cicman (from FC Lokomotíva Košice)
—	FW	SVK	Róbert Jano (from FC Lokomotíva Košice)
—	MF	SVK	Ladislav Hirjak (from FC Lokomotíva Košice)
—	FW	SVK	Kevin Zsigmond (on loan from FC DAC 1904 Dunajská Streda)
—	GK	SVK	Martin Leško (on loan from MŠK Žilina)
—	MF	SRB	Goran Matić (on loan from KFC Komárno)

Out: Note: Flags indicate national team as defined under FIFA eligibility rules; some limited exceptions apply. Players may hold more than one non-FIFA nationality.

No.	Pos.	Nation	Player
—	DF	SVK	Peter Vojtovič (loan return to MFK Zemplín Michalovce)
—	MF	SVK	Roman Begala (loan return to MFK Zemplín Michalovce)
—	DF	NGR	Celestine Lazarus (Released)
—	DF	SRB	Milan Nikolić (Released)
—	MF	SVK	Emil Lukáč (Released)
—	FW	SVK	Erik Hlaváč (Released)
—	MF	BRA	Lopez Da Silva Junior (to FK Poprad)
—	DF	SVK	Jaroslav Kolbas (on loan to 1. FC Tatran Prešov)

=== MŠK Púchov ===
In: Note: Flags indicate national team as defined under FIFA eligibility rules; some limited exceptions apply. Players may hold more than one non-FIFA nationality.

No.	Pos.	Nation	Player
—	FW	SVK	Štefan Holiš (from FK Poprad)
—	DF	SVK	Marián Pišoja (on loan from AS Trenčín)
—	FW	ZIM	Leroy Mugove (from (Namibia) TBA)
—	DF	SVK	Stanislav Lacko (on loan from MŠK Žilina)
—	FW	SVK	Martin Vlček (on loan from FK Inter Bratislava)
—	MF	SVK	Dávid Machara (on loan from AS Trenčín)

Out: Note: Flags indicate national team as defined under FIFA eligibility rules; some limited exceptions apply. Players may hold more than one non-FIFA nationality.

No.	Pos.	Nation	Player
—	MF	SVK	Peter Šulek (Released)

=== FC Košice ===
In: Note: Flags indicate national team as defined under FIFA eligibility rules; some limited exceptions apply. Players may hold more than one non-FIFA nationality.

No.	Pos.	Nation	Player
—	GK	SVK	Matej Fabini (from FC Lokomotíva Košice)
—	DF	SVK	Samuel Kuc (from FK Železiarne Podbrezová)
—	DF	SVK	Matúš Katunský (from FK Železiarne Podbrezová)
—	DF	SVK	Peter Kavka (from FC Lokomotíva Košice)
—	MF	SVK	Erik Liener (from (Czech Republic) FK Baník Sokolov)
—	DF	SVK	Gergely Tumma (on loan from FC Spartak Trnava)
—	FW	SRB	Branislav Pjošta (from (Serbia) FK Proleter Novi Sad)
—	MF	SVK	Dávid Leško (from Podbrezová)

Out: Note: Flags indicate national team as defined under FIFA eligibility rules; some limited exceptions apply. Players may hold more than one non-FIFA nationality.

No.	Pos.	Nation	Player
—	DF	SVK	Timon Dobias (End of career)
—	MF	SVK	Mojmír Trebuňák (Released)
—	MF	SVK	Richard Kačala (Released)
