= List of Slovak football transfers winter 2018–19 =

Notable Slovak football transfers in the winter transfer window 2018–19 by club. Only transfers of the Fortuna Liga and 2. liga are included.

== Fortuna Liga ==
=== ŠK Slovan Bratislava ===
In: Note: Flags indicate national team as defined under FIFA eligibility rules; some limited exceptions apply. Players may hold more than one non-FIFA nationality.

No.	Pos.	Nation	Player
—	DF	HUN	Richárd Guzmics (from (China) Yanbian Fude F.C.)
—	FW	BRA	Rafael Ratão (on loan from (Ukraine) FC Zorya Luhansk)
—	DF	SVK	Martin Majling (from ŠK Slovan Bratislava youth)
—	DF	AUT	Stefan Stangl (free agent)

Out: Note: Flags indicate national team as defined under FIFA eligibility rules; some limited exceptions apply. Players may hold more than one non-FIFA nationality.

No.	Pos.	Nation	Player
—	DF	SVK	Kornel Saláta (Released and joined (Hungary) Szombathelyi Haladás)
—	DF	SRB	Milan Rundić (to (Czech Republic) MFK Karviná)
—	MF	NED	Mitchell Schet (Released)
—	MF	NED	Ricky van Haaren (Released)
—	MF	MNE	Vukan Savićević (to (Poland) Wisła Kraków)
—	FW	SVK	David Hrnčár (on loan to FK Pohronie)
—	DF	SVK	Adam Laczkó (on loan to AS Trenčín)
—	FW	SVK	Filip Hološko (to (Czech Republic) 1. FC Slovácko)

=== FC DAC 1904 Dunajská Streda ===
In: Note: Flags indicate national team as defined under FIFA eligibility rules; some limited exceptions apply. Players may hold more than one non-FIFA nationality.

No.	Pos.	Nation	Player
—	FW	SVK	Alan Kováč (loan return from FK Senica)
—	DF	HUN	Dániel Csóka (on loan from (England) Wolverhampton Wanderers Under-23)
—	FW	CZE	Karsten Ayong (from (Czech Republic) 1. FK Příbram)
—	GK	POL	Tomasz Kucz (on loan from (Germany) Bayer 04 Leverkusen)
—	FW	NGR	Abdulrahman Taiwo (from FC Nitra)
—	MF	IRL	Connor Ronan (on loan from (England) Wolverhampton Wanderers)
—	DF	SVK	Matúš Malý (from FC DAC 1904 Dunajská Streda youth)
—	FW	SVK	Marko Kelemen (from FC DAC 1904 Dunajská Streda youth)
—	MF	SVK	Ladislav Nagy (from FC DAC 1904 Dunajská Streda youth)

Out: Note: Flags indicate national team as defined under FIFA eligibility rules; some limited exceptions apply. Players may hold more than one non-FIFA nationality.

No.	Pos.	Nation	Player
—	DF	SVK	Timotej Záhumenský (on loan to (Czech Republic) MFK Karviná)
—	FW	CIV	Vakoun Issouf Bayo (to (Scotland) Celtic F.C.)
—	FW	SVK	Roland Černák (on loan to MFK Zemplín Michalovce)
—	FW	SVK	Ladislav Almási (on loan to FC ŠTK 1914 Šamorín)
—	FW	SVK	Martin Rymarenko (on loan to KFC Komárno)
—	DF	SVK	Dominik Špiriak (on loan to MFK Zemplín Michalovce)
—	FW	SVK	Alan Kováč (to (Hungary) Győri ETO FC)
—	DF	BIH	Branko Bajić (to (Bosnia and Herzegovina) FK Željezničar Sarajevo)
—	MF	ALB	Esmerald Aluku (to TBA)

=== MŠK Žilina ===
In: Note: Flags indicate national team as defined under FIFA eligibility rules; some limited exceptions apply. Players may hold more than one non-FIFA nationality.

No.	Pos.	Nation	Player
—	DF	GEO	Luka Lochoshvili (on loan from (Ukraine) FC Dynamo Kyiv)

Out: Note: Flags indicate national team as defined under FIFA eligibility rules; some limited exceptions apply. Players may hold more than one non-FIFA nationality.

No.	Pos.	Nation	Player
—	DF	AUS	Aleksandar Susnjar (loan return to (Czech Republic) FK Mladá Boleslav)
—	DF	GEO	Giorgi Tevzadze (Released)
—	DF	SVK	Matej Dybala (on loan to ŠKF Sereď)

=== MFK Ružomberok ===
In: Note: Flags indicate national team as defined under FIFA eligibility rules; some limited exceptions apply. Players may hold more than one non-FIFA nationality.

No.	Pos.	Nation	Player
—	DF	SVK	Šimon Kupec (loan return from (Poland) GKS Katowice)
—	FW	SVK	Tomáš Bobček (from MFK Ružomberok youth)

Out: Note: Flags indicate national team as defined under FIFA eligibility rules; some limited exceptions apply. Players may hold more than one non-FIFA nationality.

No.	Pos.	Nation	Player
—	FW	CZE	Erik Daniel (to MFK Ružomberok II)
—	MF	SVK	Dominik Kunca (on loan to (Czech Republic) 1. SC Znojmo)
—	DF	SVK	Šimon Kupec (Released)

=== ŠKF Sereď ===
In: Note: Flags indicate national team as defined under FIFA eligibility rules; some limited exceptions apply. Players may hold more than one non-FIFA nationality.

No.	Pos.	Nation	Player
—	FW	SVK	Marek Kuzma (from (Poland) Puszcza Niepołomice)
—	FW	TTO	Kathon St. Hillaire (from (Czech Republic) 1. SC Znojmo)
—	FW	CRO	Dino Špehar (from (Albania) FK Kukësi)
—	MF	SVK	Alex Iván (on loan from DAC Dunajská Streda)
—	DF	SVK	Matej Dybala (on loan from MŠK Žilina)
—	MF	SVK	Kristián Lukáčik (on loan from FK Železiarne Podbrezová)
—	FW	SVK	Miloš Lačný (from (Georgia (country)) Torpedo Kutaisi)

Out: Note: Flags indicate national team as defined under FIFA eligibility rules; some limited exceptions apply. Players may hold more than one non-FIFA nationality.

No.	Pos.	Nation	Player
—	FW	SRB	Nemanja Subotić (to (Kazakhstan) FC Taraz)
—	FW	MKD	Stefan Bogdanovski (loan return to Spartak Trnava II)
—	FW	SRB	Uroš Vuković (to (Serbia) TBA)
—	MF	CRO	Nikola Gatarić (to FC Nitra)
—	FW	ARM	Vahagn Militosyan (to (France) US Changéenne)

=== FC Nitra ===
In: Note: Flags indicate national team as defined under FIFA eligibility rules; some limited exceptions apply. Players may hold more than one non-FIFA nationality.

No.	Pos.	Nation	Player
—	DF	SVK	Patrik Šurnovský (loan return from KFC Komárno)
—	MF	SVK	Frederik Bilovský (from (Czech Republic) FK Dukla Prague)
—	MF	SVK	Šimon Štefanec (on loan from (Italy) Hellas Verona)
—	FW	SRB	Nemanja Soković (from (Serbia) FK Cement Beočin)
—	GK	SVK	Branislav Pindroch (from (England) Notts County F.C.)
—	DF	CRO	Ivan Zgrablić (from (Romania) FC Voluntari)
—	MF	SVK	Patrik Danek (from FC Nitra youth)
—	DF	SVK	Dominik Straňák (from FC Nitra youth)
—	GK	SVK	Erik Búš (from FC Nitra youth)
—	MF	SVK	Ondrej Vrábel (footballer) (from FC Nitra youth)
—	MF	CRO	Nikola Gatarić (from ŠKF Sereď)

Out: Note: Flags indicate national team as defined under FIFA eligibility rules; some limited exceptions apply. Players may hold more than one non-FIFA nationality.

No.	Pos.	Nation	Player
—	MF	SVK	Andrej Fábry (to (Czech Republic) FK Jablonec)
31	GK	SVK	Lukáš Hroššo (to (Poland) Zagłębie Sosnowiec)
—	DF	SVK	Richard Križan (to (Hungary) Puskás Akadémia FC)
—	FW	NGR	Abdulrahman Taiwo (to FC DAC 1904 Dunajská Streda)
—	MF	UKR	Illya Cherednychenko (Released)
—	MF	SVK	Christián Steinhübel (Released)
—	MF	SVK	Róbert Valenta (End of professional career)

=== MFK Zemplín Michalovce ===
In: Note: Flags indicate national team as defined under FIFA eligibility rules; some limited exceptions apply. Players may hold more than one non-FIFA nationality.

No.	Pos.	Nation	Player
—	MF	SVK	Adrián Leško (loan return from 1. FC Tatran Prešov)
—	FW	SVK	Roland Černák (on loan from FC DAC 1904 Dunajská Streda)
—	MF	GRE	Christos Kountouriotis (on loan from (Greece) Panathinaikos F.C.)
—	DF	SVK	Dominik Špiriak (on loan from FC DAC 1904 Dunajská Streda)
—	MF	ESP	José Casado (from FC ViOn Zlaté Moravce)
—	FW	ESP	Mamadou Tounkara (on loan from (Italy) Lazio)
—	FW	UKR	Yuriy Zakharkiv (from (Lithuania) FK Atlantas)
—	GK	UKR	Rostyslav Dehtiar (from (Ukraine) FC Stal Kamianske)
—	MF	SVK	Matej Trusa (from MFK Zemplín Michalovce youth)

Out: Note: Flags indicate national team as defined under FIFA eligibility rules; some limited exceptions apply. Players may hold more than one non-FIFA nationality.

No.	Pos.	Nation	Player
—	DF	SVK	Peter Kavka (End of contract)
—	MF	SVK	Blažej Vaščák (End of contract)
—	MF	USA	Brian Iloski (loan return to (Poland) Legia Warsaw)
—	DF	POL	Tomasz Nawotka (loan return to (Poland) Legia Warsaw)
—	FW	POL	Dawid Kurminowski (loan return to (Poland) Lech Poznań)
—	MF	SVK	Adrián Leško (to FC Lokomotíva Košice)

=== FC Spartak Trnava ===
In: Note: Flags indicate national team as defined under FIFA eligibility rules; some limited exceptions apply. Players may hold more than one non-FIFA nationality.

No.	Pos.	Nation	Player
—	DF	SVK	Matúš Turňa (free agent, previously at Podbrezová)
—	DF	CZE	Václav Dudl (on loan from (Czech Republic) AC Sparta Prague)
—	DF	BRA	Lucas Lovat (from (Brazil) Avaí FC)
—	DF	SVK	Marek Janečka (from (Czech Republic) MFK Karviná)
—	DF	SVK	Tomáš Košút (from (Bulgaria) FC Vereya)
—	DF	NED	Myenty Abena (from (Netherlands) De Graafschap)
—	GK	CZE	Petr Bolek (from (Czech Republic) FC Dolní Benešov)
—	FW	SVK	David Depetris (from (Argentina) Club Atlético Huracán)
—	MF	NGR	Musefiu Ashiru (from (Czech Republic) FC Zbrojovka Brno)
—	MF	MKD	Kire Markoski (on loan from (Cyprus) AEL Limassol)
—	DF	USA	Macario Hing-Glover (free agent)

Out: Note: Flags indicate national team as defined under FIFA eligibility rules; some limited exceptions apply. Players may hold more than one non-FIFA nationality.

No.	Pos.	Nation	Player
—	DF	SVK	Andrej Kadlec (to (Poland) Jagiellonia Białystok)
—	DF	SVK	Matej Oravec (End of contract and joined Podbrezová)
—	DF	SVK	Martin Tóth (to (Poland) Zagłębie Sosnowiec)
—	MF	SVK	Lukáš Greššák (to (Poland) Zagłębie Sosnowiec)
—	MF	SVK	Erik Jirka (to (Serbia) Red Star Belgrade)
—	FW	IRI	Ali Ghorbani (to (Iran) Sepahan)
—	FW	SVK	Marek Bakoš (loan return to (Czech Republic) FC Viktoria Plzeň)
—	DF	SVK	Boris Godál (to (Cyprus) AEL Limassol)
—	GK	SVK	Martin Chudý (to (Poland) Górnik Zabrze)
—	MF	GEO	Vakhtang Chanturishvili (to (Czech Republic) FC Fastav Zlín)
—	MF	GEO	Davit Skhirtladze (Released and joined (Latvia) Riga FC)
—	FW	BIH	Senad Jarović (Released and joined (Denmark) SønderjyskE)
—	DF	SVK	Oliver Janso (Released and joined (Czech Republic) FK Ústí nad Labem)
—	DF	SVK	Lukáš Lupták (Released and joined (Czech Republic) FK Fotbal Třinec)
—	DF	SVK	Ivan Hladík (Released and joined (Lithuania) FK Sūduva)
—	FW	CRO	Filip Dangubić (on loan to FK Senica)
—	GK	SVK	Peter Urminský (on loan to AS Trenčín)

=== AS Trenčín ===
In: Note: Flags indicate national team as defined under FIFA eligibility rules; some limited exceptions apply. Players may hold more than one non-FIFA nationality.

No.	Pos.	Nation	Player
—	MF	GHA	Mohammed Lamine (from (Ghana) Accra Lions FC)
—	DF	SVK	Adam Laczkó (on loan from ŠK Slovan Bratislava)
—	GK	SVK	Peter Urminský (on loan from FC Spartak Trnava)

Out: Note: Flags indicate national team as defined under FIFA eligibility rules; some limited exceptions apply. Players may hold more than one non-FIFA nationality.

No.	Pos.	Nation	Player
—	FW	CRO	Antonio Mance (on loan to (France) FC Nantes)

=== FK Železiarne Podbrezová ===
In: Note: Flags indicate national team as defined under FIFA eligibility rules; some limited exceptions apply. Players may hold more than one non-FIFA nationality.

No.	Pos.	Nation	Player
—	MF	SVK	Jozef Špyrka (from FK Pohronie)
—	FW	SVK	Daniel Pavúk (from FK Pohronie)
—	MF	SVK	René Paraj (from FK Pohronie)
—	MF	SVK	Jozef Pastorek (from (England) Aston Villa Under-23)
—	DF	POL	Jakub Piotr Kiwior (from (Belgium) R.S.C. Anderlecht)
—	MF	SVK	Samuel Štefánik (from Free Agent and recently played for (Poland) Bruk-Bet Termalica Nieciecza)
—	GK	SVK	Martin Vantruba (on loan from (Czech Republic) SK Slavia Prague)
—	DF	SVK	Matej Oravec (from Free agent and recently played for FC Spartak Trnava)
—	MF	SVK	Lukáš Urbanič (on loan from FK Poprad)
—	FW	NGR	Victor Olatunji (on loan from (Nigeria) Lagos Islanders)
—	MF	NGR	David Adeniyi Fadairo (on loan from (Nigeria) Lagos Islanders)
—	GK	SVK	Ivan Rehák (from FK Železiarne Podbrezová youth)
—	FW	SVK	Roland Galčík (from FK Železiarne Podbrezová youth)
—	FW	SVK	Peter Voško (from FK Železiarne Podbrezová youth)
—	MF	SVK	Filip Halgoš (on loan from (Czech Republic) FK Viktoria Žižkov)
—	FW	SVK	Filip Hlohovský (from Free Agent)

Out: Note: Flags indicate national team as defined under FIFA eligibility rules; some limited exceptions apply. Players may hold more than one non-FIFA nationality.

No.	Pos.	Nation	Player
—	DF	SVK	Matúš Turňa (Released)
—	FW	UKR	Illia Tereshchenko (Released)
—	MF	CRO	Stijepo Njire (Released)
—	DF	NZL	Jesse Edge (Released)
—	GK	SVK	Martin Kuciak (Released and joined (Czech Republic) SK Slavia Prague)
—	MF	SVK	Adrián Kopičár (Released)
—	FW	NED	Endy Opoku Bernadina (Released and joined (Czech Republic) SFC Opava)
—	DF	SVK	Daniel Magda (on loan to FC ŠTK Fluminense Šamorín)
—	MF	SVK	Kristián Lukáčik (on loan to ŠKF Sereď)
—	DF	SVK	Martin Baran (Released)
—	MF	SVK	Jakub Sedláček (on loan to FK Pohronie)

=== FK Senica ===
In: Note: Flags indicate national team as defined under FIFA eligibility rules; some limited exceptions apply. Players may hold more than one non-FIFA nationality.

No.	Pos.	Nation	Player
—	MF	FRA	Sofian El Moudane (from Free agent)
—	FW	JAM	Kevaughn Atkinson (on loan from (Malta) St. Andrews F.C.)
—	DF	FRA	Gabriel Dubois (from (France) Athlético Marseille)
—	FW	VEN	Eric Ramírez (on loan from (Czech Republic) MFK Karviná)
—	DF	CRO	Stjepan Vuković (from (Croatia) NK Uskok)

Out: Note: Flags indicate national team as defined under FIFA eligibility rules; some limited exceptions apply. Players may hold more than one non-FIFA nationality.

No.	Pos.	Nation	Player
—	MF	COL	Diego Cuadros (loan return to (Colombia) Jaguares de Córdoba)
—	FW	SVK	Alan Kováč (loan return to FC DAC 1904 Dunajská Streda)
—	DF	FRA	Victor Nirennold (Released and joined (Vietnam) SHB Đà Nẵng F.C.)
—	FW	COL	Naren Solano (to (Chile) Deportes Valdivia)
—	DF	SVK	Juraj Kotula (loan return to ŠK Slovan Bratislava)
—	FW	VEN	Richard Celis (on loan to (Venezuela) Caracas F.C.)

=== FC ViOn Zlaté Moravce ===
In: Note: Flags indicate national team as defined under FIFA eligibility rules; some limited exceptions apply. Players may hold more than one non-FIFA nationality.

No.	Pos.	Nation	Player
—	MF	CRO	Krešimir Kelez (from (Croatia) RNK Split)
—	DF	CRO	Antonio Asanović (from (Switzerland) NK Pajde Möhlin)
—	MF	SVK	Martin Válovčan (from (Switzerland) SC Zofingen)
—	DF	SVK	Marek Beseda (from (Czech Republic) FC Vysočina Jihlava)
—	FW	SVK	Vladimír Tkáč (from FK Tempo Partizánske)
—	DF	SVK	Matúš Hitka (from FC Petržalka)
—	MF	UKR	Vladyslav Khomutov (from Free agent, previously at (Ukraine) FC Chornomorets Odesa)
—	MF	MKD	Tomče Grozdanovski (from Free agent, previously at (North Macedonia) FK Metalurg Skopje)
—	DF	CMR	Noé Kwin (on loan from FC DAC 1904 Dunajská Streda)
—	FW	CZE	Tomáš Dočekal (from (Czech Republic) FK Viktoria Žižkov)

Out: Note: Flags indicate national team as defined under FIFA eligibility rules; some limited exceptions apply. Players may hold more than one non-FIFA nationality.

No.	Pos.	Nation	Player
—	DF	SVK	Patrik Banovič (Released and joined ŠK Majcichov)
—	FW	SVK	Ľubomír Urgela (Released and joined (Austria) SC-ESV Parndorf 1919)
—	DF	NGR	Christopher Udeh (loan return to AS Trenčín)
—	MF	BRA	Ewerton (to (Czech Republic) FK Mladá Boleslav)
—	DF	SRB	Aleksandar Miličević (Released)
—	MF	ESP	José Casado (End of contract and joined MFK Zemplín Michalovce)
—	DF	SRB	Miloš Nikolić (Released)
—	DF	SRB	Nikola Dimitrijević (on loan to (Serbia) FK Inđija)
—	DF	SVK	Igor Zelník (on loan to TJ Družstevník Veľké Ludince)

== 2. liga ==
=== FK Pohronie ===
In: Note: Flags indicate national team as defined under FIFA eligibility rules; some limited exceptions apply. Players may hold more than one non-FIFA nationality.

No.	Pos.	Nation	Player
—	MF	SVK	Ján Dzúrik (from 1. FC Tatran Prešov)
—	FW	SVK	David Hrnčár (on loan from ŠK Slovan Bratislava)
—	FW	SVK	Dávid Kondrlík (on loan from OFK Dunajská Lužná)
—	MF	SVK	Jakub Sedláček (on loan from FK Železiarne Podbrezová)
—	MF	SVK	Patrik Abrahám (from MFK Skalica)
—	FW	SRB	Stefan Visić (on loan from MŠK Novohrad Lučenec)

Out: Note: Flags indicate national team as defined under FIFA eligibility rules; some limited exceptions apply. Players may hold more than one non-FIFA nationality.

No.	Pos.	Nation	Player
—	MF	SVK	Marek Frimmel (to MFK Skalica)
—	MF	SVK	Jozef Špyrka (to FK Železiarne Podbrezová)
—	FW	SVK	Daniel Pavúk (to FK Železiarne Podbrezová)
—	MF	SVK	René Paraj (to FK Železiarne Podbrezová)
—	MF	SVK	Peter Ďungel (to (Poland) Stal Mielec)
—	FW	SVK	Roman Litwiak (Released)

=== MFK Tatran Liptovský Mikuláš ===
In: Note: Flags indicate national team as defined under FIFA eligibility rules; some limited exceptions apply. Players may hold more than one non-FIFA nationality.

No.	Pos.	Nation	Player
—	MF	SVK	Michal Žákovič (loan return from ŠKM Liptovský Hrádok)
—	MF	SVK	Rastislav Václavík (on loan from MŠK Žilina)
—	MF	SRB	Slobodan Andrić (loan return from FK Humenné)

Out: Note: Flags indicate national team as defined under FIFA eligibility rules; some limited exceptions apply. Players may hold more than one non-FIFA nationality.

No.	Pos.	Nation	Player
—	DF	SVK	Ivan Očenáš (to (Poland) Olimpia Grudziądz)
—	FW	RUS	Vladislav Trotsenko (End of contract)

=== MFK Skalica ===
In: Note: Flags indicate national team as defined under FIFA eligibility rules; some limited exceptions apply. Players may hold more than one non-FIFA nationality.

No.	Pos.	Nation	Player
—	MF	SVK	Marek Frimmel (from FK Pohronie)
—	MF	SVK	Martin Kovaľ (on loan from MŠK Žilina II)
—	MF	SVK	Filip Blažek (on loan from (Denmark) Brøndby IF)
—	DF	SRB	Mihajilo Popović (from KFC Komárno)

Out: Note: Flags indicate national team as defined under FIFA eligibility rules; some limited exceptions apply. Players may hold more than one non-FIFA nationality.

No.	Pos.	Nation	Player
—	FW	SVK	Jozef Dolný (Released)
—	FW	SVK	Jozef Sombat (Released)
—	DF	SVK	Adam Jamrich (Released)
—	FW	SVK	Michal Jakubek (Released)
—	MF	SVK	Patrik Abrahám (Released)
—	DF	SVK	Ladislav Szöcs (Released)

=== KFC Komárno ===
In: Note: Flags indicate national team as defined under FIFA eligibility rules; some limited exceptions apply. Players may hold more than one non-FIFA nationality.

No.	Pos.	Nation	Player
—	FW	SVK	Martin Rymarenko (on loan from FC DAC 1904 Dunajská Streda)
—	DF	SVK	Martin Šimko (on loan from FC DAC 1904 Dunajská Streda)
—	DF	SVK	Šimon Kupec (on loan from MFK Ružomberok)
—	MF	SVK	Erik Ujlaky (from (Austria) SC Gattendorf)
—	MF	SVK	Dominik Ujlaky (from (Austria) SV Zwentendorf)
—	DF	HUN	Bálint Krén (on loan from (Hungary) Győri ETO FC youth)
—	MF	SVK	Peter Ľupčo (on loan from MŠK Žilina)
—	DF	SVK	Samuel Antálek (from ŠK Slovan Bratislava)
—	FW	SVK	Patrik Pinte (on loan from (Hungary) Szombathelyi Haladás)
—	FW	NGR	Michael Mbadinuju (on loan from (Hungary) Győri ETO FC)
—	MF	SVK	Daniel Valach (from (Germany) OSC Bremerhaven)

Out: Note: Flags indicate national team as defined under FIFA eligibility rules; some limited exceptions apply. Players may hold more than one non-FIFA nationality.

No.	Pos.	Nation	Player
—	DF	SVK	Patrik Šurnovský (loan return to FC Nitra)
—	DF	SRB	Mihajilo Popović (to MFK Skalica)
—	MF	CZE	Lukáš Duda (loan return to (Czech Republic) MFK Karviná)
—	MF	SVK	Dávid Krisztián Szikonya (on loan to FK Marcelová)
—	MF	SVK	Adam Fronc (loan return to FC DAC 1904 Dunajská Streda)
—	FW	MKD	Izer Ajrulahu (on loan from (North Macedonia) FC Genç Kalemler)

=== FK Poprad ===
In: Note: Flags indicate national team as defined under FIFA eligibility rules; some limited exceptions apply. Players may hold more than one non-FIFA nationality.

No.	Pos.	Nation	Player
—	DF	SVK	Martin Luberda (from 1. FC Tatran Prešov)
—	GK	UKR	Yurii Pohoryliak (from FK Tatran Zámutov)
—	FW	ESP	Enzo Arevalo (from Free agent)
—	MF	SVK	Samuel Kuba (from FK Poprad youth)

Out: Note: Flags indicate national team as defined under FIFA eligibility rules; some limited exceptions apply. Players may hold more than one non-FIFA nationality.

No.	Pos.	Nation	Player
—	DF	SVK	Slavomír Kica (Released)
—	MF	SVK	Lukáš Urbanič (on loan to FK Železiarne Podbrezová)
—	MF	CRO	Duje Medak (End of contract)

=== FC Petržalka ===
In: Note: Flags indicate national team as defined under FIFA eligibility rules; some limited exceptions apply. Players may hold more than one non-FIFA nationality.

No.	Pos.	Nation	Player
—	DF	SVK	Denis Horník (from FC Spartak Trnava)
—	FW	SVK	Jakub Kosorin (from (Czech Republic) FK Hodonín)
—	DF	SVK	Ladislav Szöcs (from MFK Skalica)
—	MF	SVK	Péter Nagy (from FC DAC 1904 Dunajská Streda)
—	FW	SVK	Jozef Sombat (from MFK Skalica)

Out: Note: Flags indicate national team as defined under FIFA eligibility rules; some limited exceptions apply. Players may hold more than one non-FIFA nationality.

No.	Pos.	Nation	Player
—	GK	SVK	Milan Valašik (on loan to OFK Dunajská Lužná)
—	GK	SVK	Michal Petrovič (on loan to FK Slovan Most pri Bratislave)
—	FW	SVK	Michal Maco (on loan to FK Slovan Most pri Bratislave)
—	FW	SVK	František Hečko (to (Austria) TBA)
—	DF	SVK	Martin Privrel (to (Austria) TBA)
—	DF	SVK	Peter Petráš (Released)
—	MF	SVK	František Lády (to OFK Dunajská Lužná)
—	DF	SVK	Matúš Hitka (to FC ViOn Zlaté Moravce)
—	MF	SVK	Alex Iván (to ŠKF Sereď)

=== MŠK Žilina II ===
In: Note: Flags indicate national team as defined under FIFA eligibility rules; some limited exceptions apply. Players may hold more than one non-FIFA nationality.

No.	Pos.	Nation	Player
—	FW	POL	Dawid Kurminowski (on loan from (Poland) Lech Poznań)

Out: Note: Flags indicate national team as defined under FIFA eligibility rules; some limited exceptions apply. Players may hold more than one non-FIFA nationality.

No.	Pos.	Nation	Player
—	MF	SVK	Martin Kovaľ (on loan to MFK Skalica)

=== FK Dubnica ===
In: Note: Flags indicate national team as defined under FIFA eligibility rules; some limited exceptions apply. Players may hold more than one non-FIFA nationality.

No.	Pos.	Nation	Player
—	GK	SVK	Branislav Žilka (from (Czech Republic) TJ Sokol Nevšová)
—	MF	SVK	Lukáš Nosický (from FK Dubnica youth)
—	DF	SVK	Matej Vaculík (on loan from MŠK Slovan Trenčianske Teplice)

Out: Note: Flags indicate national team as defined under FIFA eligibility rules; some limited exceptions apply. Players may hold more than one non-FIFA nationality.

No.	Pos.	Nation	Player
—	MF	SVK	Andriy Zahranychnyy (to (Czech Republic) SC Radotín)
—	MF	CZE	Martin Nečas (to (Czech Republic) FC Fastav Zlín)

=== FC ŠTK Fluminense Šamorín ===
In: Note: Flags indicate national team as defined under FIFA eligibility rules; some limited exceptions apply. Players may hold more than one non-FIFA nationality.

No.	Pos.	Nation	Player
—	MF	BRA	Gabriel Capixaba (on loan from (Brazil) Fluminense FC)
—	DF	BRA	Diogo (on loan from (Brazil) Fluminense FC)
—	FW	SVK	Tamás Méry (on loan from (Hungary) Győri ETO FC)
—	MF	BRA	Luquinhas (on loan from (Brazil) Fluminense FC)
—	FW	SVK	Ladislav Almási (on loan from FC DAC 1904 Dunajská Streda)
—	DF	SVK	Daniel Magda (on loan from FK Železiarne Podbrezová)
—	MF	SVK	Adrián Kopičár (from FK Železiarne Podbrezová)
—	GK	SVK	Matúš Ružinský (on loan from ŠK Slovan Bratislava)

Out: Note: Flags indicate national team as defined under FIFA eligibility rules; some limited exceptions apply. Players may hold more than one non-FIFA nationality.

No.	Pos.	Nation	Player
—	GK	SVK	Dalibor Rožník (End of career)
—	FW	BRA	Matheus Pato (loan return to (Brazil) Fluminense FC)
—	MF	SVK	Šimon Šmehýl (to TBA)
—	FW	SVK	Roman Sabler (to (Austria) FC Stadlau)
—	MF	SVK	Lukáš Hruška (Released)
—	DF	SVK	Peter Jánošík (Released)

=== FK Inter Bratislava ===
In: Note: Flags indicate national team as defined under FIFA eligibility rules; some limited exceptions apply. Players may hold more than one non-FIFA nationality.

No.	Pos.	Nation	Player
—	DF	SVK	Emil Haladej (on loan from 1. FC Tatran Prešov)
—	DF	BEL	Charni Ekangamene (from (Netherlands) FC Eindhoven)
—	DF	CRO	Bruno Bilić (from (Croatia) NK Hrvatski Dragovoljac)
—	MF	HUN	Ronald Takács (from (Hungary) MTK Budapest)

Out: Note: Flags indicate national team as defined under FIFA eligibility rules; some limited exceptions apply. Players may hold more than one non-FIFA nationality.

No.	Pos.	Nation	Player
—	MF	SVK	Tomáš Svečula (loan return to AS Trenčín)
—	FW	NGR	Victor Olatunji (to (Nigeria) Lagos Islanders)
—	GK	UKR	Alexander Morgos (loan return to AS Trenčín)

=== MFK Dukla Banská Bystrica ===
In: Note: Flags indicate national team as defined under FIFA eligibility rules; some limited exceptions apply. Players may hold more than one non-FIFA nationality.

No.	Pos.	Nation	Player
—	FW	SVK	Jozef Dolný (on loan from MFK Skalica)
—	MF	SVK	Blažej Vaščák (on loan from MFK Zemplín Michalovce)
—	MF	SVK	Miroslav Gregáň (on loan from ŠKM Liptovský Hrádok)
—	FW	CRO	Josip Galić (on loan from TJ Sklotatran Poltár)

Out: Note: Flags indicate national team as defined under FIFA eligibility rules; some limited exceptions apply. Players may hold more than one non-FIFA nationality.

No.	Pos.	Nation	Player
—	FW	SVK	Radoslav Ďanovský (Released)
—	MF	SVK	Daniel Cvik (Released)
—	FW	ZIM	Tawanda Tapiwa Muchaya (Released)
—	MF	SVK	Jakub Tóth (to ŠK Badín)

=== 1. FC Tatran Prešov ===
In: Note: Flags indicate national team as defined under FIFA eligibility rules; some limited exceptions apply. Players may hold more than one non-FIFA nationality.

No.	Pos.	Nation	Player
—	DF	SVK	Miroslav Keresteš (from (Czech Republic) FK Mladá Boleslav)
—	DF	SRB	Stefan Vilotić (from (Czech Republic) SK Slavia Prague)
—	DF	SRB	Aleksandar Mitrović (from (Serbia) FK Sloboda Užice)
—	MF	SRB	Mihailo Cmiljanović (from (Serbia) FK Kolubara)
—	FW	SVK	Stanislav Olejník (from 1. FC Tatran Prešov youth)
—	MF	SVK	Oliver Luterán (from 1. FC Tatran Prešov youth)
—	MF	SVK	Roman Kovalčík (on loan from MFK Vranov nad Topľou)
—	FW	SVK	Lukáš Hricov (on loan from FK Soľ)
—	MF	CRO	Nediljko Kovacević (from (Slovenia) FC Koper)
—	FW	CRO	Milan Basrak (from (Malta) Birkirkara F.C.)

Out: Note: Flags indicate national team as defined under FIFA eligibility rules; some limited exceptions apply. Players may hold more than one non-FIFA nationality.

No.	Pos.	Nation	Player
—	DF	BIH	Ivan Dujmović (loan return to (Czech Republic) FC Vysočina Jihlava)
—	FW	BIH	Amir Mašić (loan return to (Czech Republic) FC Vysočina Jihlava)
—	DF	SVK	Martin Luberda (End of contract and joined FK Poprad)
—	DF	SVK	Jakub Bartek (End of contract and joined Partizán Bardejov)
—	DF	SVK	Ján Dzurík (End of contract and joined FK Pohronie)
—	MF	SVK	Dávid Keresteš (End of contract and joined Partizán Bardejov)
—	DF	SVK	Richard Kačala (End of contract and joined FC Košice)
—	MF	SVK	Lukáš Micherda (End of contract and joined Partizán Bardejov)
—	FW	CZE	Petr Hošek (End of contract)
—	MF	SVK	Adrián Leško (loan return to MFK Zemplín Michalovce)
—	MF	SVK	Erik Micovčák (loan return to (Czech Republic) FC Slovan Liberec)
—	DF	SVK	Miroslav Petko (Released)
—	DF	SVK	Emil Haladej (on loan to FK Inter Bratislava)

=== ŠK Odeva Lipany ===
In: Note: Flags indicate national team as defined under FIFA eligibility rules; some limited exceptions apply. Players may hold more than one non-FIFA nationality.

No.	Pos.	Nation	Player
—	MF	SVK	Juraj Hovančík (from FC Lokomotíva Košice)
—	MF	SVK	Matej Hovančík (loan return from FK Šarišské Dravce)
—	FW	SVK	Peter Sládek (from (Poland) Podbeskidzie Bielsko-Biała)
—	DF	UKR	Oleksiy Milyutin (on loan from OFK Baník Lehota pod Vtáčnikom)

Out: Note: Flags indicate national team as defined under FIFA eligibility rules; some limited exceptions apply. Players may hold more than one non-FIFA nationality.

No.	Pos.	Nation	Player
—	FW	SVK	Tomáš Jusko (Released)
—	DF	SVK	Pavol Popovec (to TJ Sokol Ľubotice)
—	DF	SVK	Tomáš Martoňák (Released)
—	MF	SVK	Marek Krafčík (on loan to FK Družstevník Plavnica)
—	MF	SVK	Dávid Scholtés (loan return to Partizán Bardejov)

=== Partizán Bardejov ===
In: Note: Flags indicate national team as defined under FIFA eligibility rules; some limited exceptions apply. Players may hold more than one non-FIFA nationality.

No.	Pos.	Nation	Player
—	DF	SVK	Slavomír Kica (from FK Poprad)
—	DF	SVK	Lukáš Micherda (from 1. FC Tatran Prešov)
—	DF	SVK	Jakub Bartek (from 1. FC Tatran Prešov)
—	MF	SVK	Dávid Keresteš (from 1. FC Tatran Prešov)
—	MF	SVK	Radoslav Človečko (from FC Lokomotíva Košice)
—	DF	SVK	Ľubomír Korijkov (from FC Lokomotíva Košice)

Out: Note: Flags indicate national team as defined under FIFA eligibility rules; some limited exceptions apply. Players may hold more than one non-FIFA nationality.

No.	Pos.	Nation	Player
—	DF	SVK	Dominik Lukáč (Released)
—	FW	BRA	Rômulo Silva Santos (Released)
—	MF	HAI	Emmanuel Sarki (Released)
—	DF	SVK	Emil Haladej (Released)
—	MF	RSA	Mkhanyiseli Siwahla (Released)

=== FC Lokomotíva Košice ===
In: Note: Flags indicate national team as defined under FIFA eligibility rules; some limited exceptions apply. Players may hold more than one non-FIFA nationality.

No.	Pos.	Nation	Player
—	MF	SVK	Adrián Leško (from MFK Zemplín Michalovce)
—	DF	SVK	Miroslav Petko (from 1. FC Tatran Prešov)
—	FW	SVK	Matúš Stropkay (from FK POKROK SEZ Krompachy)
—	GK	BRA	Vitor Ferreira (from (Brazil) União Mogi)
—	MF	BRA	Renan De Souza (from (Brazil) EC São Bernardo)
—	MF	BRA	Leonardo Montezello (from (Brazil) Guarulhos)
—	MF	BRA	Kayque Santos (from (Brazil) Corinthians)
—	DF	BRA	Victor Lemos (from (Brazil) Clube Atlético Juventus)
—	DF	BRA	Antonio Santos (from (Brazil) União Mogi)
—	DF	BRA	Wiliam Lucas (from (Brazil) Guarulhos)
—	MF	BRA	Fagundes (from (Brazil) TBA)
—	MF	BRA	Baiano (from (Brazil) TBA)
—	DF	BRA	Rodrigo Faria (from (Brazil) União Mogi)
—	FW	BRA	Henrique Araújo (from (Ukraine) FC Lviv)
—	MF	SVK	Ľubomír Ivanko-Macej (from (Czech Republic) FC Sellier & Bellot Vlašim)
—	MF	CRO	Ivan Pastuović (from (Croatia) HNK Val Kaštel Stari)
—	DF	NZL	Jesse Edge (from FK Železiarne Podbrezová)
—	DF	SVK	Peter Kavka (on loan from MFK Zemplín Michalovce)
—	MF	UKR	Vadym Yanchak (from (Ukraine) FC Lviv)

Out: Note: Flags indicate national team as defined under FIFA eligibility rules; some limited exceptions apply. Players may hold more than one non-FIFA nationality.

No.	Pos.	Nation	Player
—	FW	SVK	Jakub Novotný (to (Hungary) Cigánd SE)
—	DF	SVK	František Pavúk (to FC Košice)
—	DF	SVK	Adam Kuľha (to FK Humenné)
—	MF	SVK	Kamil Karaš (to FC Košice)
—	MF	SVK	Juraj Hovančík (to ŠK Odeva Lipany)
—	MF	SVK	Patrik Zajac (Released and joined FK Slavoj Trebišov)
—	MF	SVK	Radoslav Človečko (Released and joined Partizán Bardejov)
—	DF	SVK	Mikuláš Tóth (Released and joined FC Košice)
—	GK	SVK	Erik Kolbas (Released and joined FK Slavoj Trebišov)
—	DF	SVK	Ľubomír Korijkov (Released and joined Partizán Bardejov)
—	MF	BRA	Guilherme Barbosa Dos Santos Silva (on loan to FK Slavoj Trebišov)
—	DF	UKR	Artem Bardetskyi (on loan to AŠK Maria Huta)

=== FK Slavoj Trebišov ===
In: Note: Flags indicate national team as defined under FIFA eligibility rules; some limited exceptions apply. Players may hold more than one non-FIFA nationality.

No.	Pos.	Nation	Player
—	MF	SVK	Patrik Zajac (from FC Lokomotíva Košice)
—	GK	SVK	Erik Kolbas (from FC Lokomotíva Košice)
—	MF	BRA	Guilherme Barbosa Dos Santos Silva (on loan from FC Lokomotíva Košice)

Out: Note: Flags indicate national team as defined under FIFA eligibility rules; some limited exceptions apply. Players may hold more than one non-FIFA nationality.

No.	Pos.	Nation	Player
—	GK	SVK	Jakub Giertl (to FC Košice)
—	DF	SVK	Peter Šuľák (Released)
—	DF	SVK	Pavol Šuľák (Released)
—	MF	SVK	Erik Gibilov (Released)
