= 2018–19 3. Liga (Slovakia) =

3. Liga
- Season: 2018–19
- Champions: Slovan Bratislava juniori TJ KOVO Beluša; MFK Ružomberok II; FC Košice
- Promoted: Slovan Bratislava juniori MŠK Púchov; MFK Ružomberok II; FC Košice

The 2018–19 3. Liga was the 26th season of the third-tier football league of Slovakia since its establishment in 1993. The league is composed of 63 teams divided in four groups of 16 teams each; only 3. liga Východ (East) includes 15 teams. Teams are divided into four divisions: 3. liga Bratislava, 3. liga Západ (West), 3. liga Stred (Central), 3. liga Východ (Eastern), according to geographical separation.

== TIPOS III. liga Bratislava ==
=== League table ===
Pos	Team	Pld	W	D	L	GF	GA	GD	Pts	Promotion or relegation
1	Slovan Bratislava B (C, P)	30	25	5	0	114	27	+87	80	Promotion to 2. Liga
2	Rača Bratislava	30	20	4	6	77	37	+40	64	
3	Rohožník	30	17	5	8	52	39	+13	56	
4	Báhoň	30	15	7	8	55	38	+17	52	
5	Most pri Bratislave	30	15	5	10	57	36	+21	50	
6	Dunajská Lužná	30	14	6	10	53	33	+20	48	
7	Tomášov	30	13	8	9	48	45	+3	47	
8	Devínska Nová Ves	30	14	4	12	53	49	+4	46	
9	Rovinka	30	14	3	13	69	71	−2	45	
10	Malacky	30	11	7	12	42	40	+2	40	
11	Pezinok	30	10	8	12	37	51	−14	38	
12	Bernolákovo	30	8	6	16	28	48	−20	30	
13	Rusovce	30	8	5	17	38	68	−30	29	
14	Ivanka pri Dunaji	30	6	9	15	33	55	−22	27	
15	Lozorno	30	4	5	21	34	65	−31	17	
16	Vajnory (R)	30	2	1	27	25	113	−88	7	Relegation to 4. liga

Source: TIPOS III. liga Bratislava
Rules for classification: 1) points; 2) goal difference; 3) number of goals scored.
(C) Champions; (P) Promoted; (R) Relegated

=== Top goalscorers ===
As of 9 June 2019.

Rank	Player	Club	Goals
1	(Slovakia) Tomáš Hrutka	FK Slovan Most pri Bratislave	21
2	(Slovakia) David Hrnčár	Slovan Bratislava B	20
2	(Slovakia) Jakub Hrnčár	TJ Rovinka	20
4	(Montenegro) Boris Cmiljanić	Slovan Bratislava B	18
4	(Slovakia) Jozef Herman	Slovan Bratislava B	18
6	(Slovakia) Martin Kubala	FK Rača	16
6	(Slovakia) Ivan Betík	FK Lokomotíva Devínska Nová Ves	16
8	(Slovakia) Ivan Lietava	ŠK Báhoň	13
8	(Slovakia) Martin Schwinghammer	TJ Rovinka	13
8	(Slovakia) Matúš Bellay	FK Rača	13

== TIPOS III. liga Západ ==
=== League table ===
Pos	Team	Pld	W	D	L	GF	GA	GD	Pts	Promotion or relegation
1	Beluša (C)	28	17	6	5	48	21	+27	57	
2	Púchov (P)	28	15	10	3	46	24	+22	55	Promotion to 2. Liga
3	Malženice	28	17	1	10	64	28	+36	52	
4	FC Nitra B	28	14	4	10	49	43	+6	46	
5	Gabčíkovo	28	12	7	9	50	36	+14	43	
6	Považská Bystrica	28	13	3	12	51	41	+10	42	
7	Spartak Trnava B	28	12	5	11	47	46	+1	41	
8	Šaľa	28	11	7	10	47	37	+10	40	
9	Kalná nad Hronom	28	11	6	11	32	38	−6	39	
10	Lednické Rovne	28	9	11	8	33	32	+1	38	
11	Zlaté Moravce - Vráble B	28	8	10	10	36	40	−4	34	
12	Veľké Ludince	28	8	7	13	29	41	−12	31	
13	Nové Mesto nad Váhom	28	7	9	12	25	41	−16	30	
14	Galanta	28	6	7	15	29	46	−17	25	
15	Nové Zámky (R)	28	3	1	24	23	95	−72	10	Relegation to 4. liga
16	Trenčianske Teplice (R)	0	0	0	0	0	0	0	0	Withdrew from the league

Source: TIPOS III. liga ZsFZ
Rules for classification: 1) points; 2) goal difference; 3) number of goals scored.
(C) Champions; (P) Promoted; (R) Relegated

=== Top goalscorers ===
As of 9 June 2019.

Rank	Player	Club	Goals
1	(Slovakia) Marek Gajdošík	MŠK Považská Bystrica	21
2	(Slovakia) Tomáš Vantruba	OFK Malženice/ Spartak Trnava II	16
3	(Slovakia) Lukáš Slávik	MŠK Považská Bystrica	15
4	(Slovakia) Pavol Orolín	OFK Malženice	14
5	(Slovakia) Matej Gorelka	TJ KOVO Beluša	13
6	(Slovakia) Marek Fábry	FC Nitra II	12
6	(Slovakia) Ladislav Tóth	ŠK 1923 Gabčíkovo	12
8	(Slovakia) Ondrej Vrábel (footballer)	FC Nitra II	10
9	(Slovakia) Kevin Zsigmond	ŠK 1923 Gabčíkovo	9
9	(Slovakia) Daniel Pilný	MŠK Púchov	9
9	(Slovakia) Stanislav Detko	ŠK LR Crystal Lednické Rovne	9
9	(Slovakia) Juraj Sekera	OFK Malženice	9

== TIPOS III. liga Stred ==
=== Locations ===
Location of teams in the 2018–19 3. Liga Stred (Central)

=== League table ===
Pos	Team	Pld	W	D	L	GF	GA	GD	Pts	Promotion or relegation
1	Ružomberok II (C, P)	30	21	5	4	78	23	+55	68	Promotion to 2. Liga
2	Rimavská Sobota	30	18	6	6	54	26	+28	60	
3	Námestovo	30	15	8	7	51	28	+23	53	
4	Zvolen	30	15	8	7	37	23	+14	53	
5	Fiľakovo	30	16	2	12	45	41	+4	50	
6	Liptovský Hrádok	30	14	6	10	48	38	+10	48	
7	Martin	30	14	6	10	59	40	+19	48	
8	Oravské Veselé	30	12	11	7	47	37	+10	47	
9	Žarnovica	30	13	6	11	45	39	+6	45	
10	Lučenec	30	10	6	14	27	43	−16	36	
11	Kalinovo (Note: TJ Baník Kalinovo was docked 6 points.)	30	11	8	11	38	50	−12	35	
12	Krásno nad Kysucou	30	8	7	15	30	46	−16	31	
13	Podbrezová II	30	7	8	15	43	49	−6	29	
14	Liptovská Štiavnica	30	7	1	22	38	80	−42	22	
15	Čadca	30	5	4	21	31	68	−37	19	
16	Poltár (Note: TJ Sklotatran Poltár was docked 6 points.) (R)	30	6	4	20	40	80	−40	16	Relegation to 4. liga

Source: TIPOS III. liga Stred
Rules for classification: 1) points; 2) goal difference; 3) number of goals scored.
(C) Champions; (P) Promoted; (R) Relegated

=== Top goalscorers ===
As of 16 June 2019.

Rank	Player	Club	Goals
1	(Slovakia) Rastislav Kružliak	MFK Ružomberok II	20
2	(Serbia) Milan Vajagić	MŠK Fomat Martin	18
3	(Slovakia) Erik Hric	MFK Lokomotíva Zvolen	16
4	(Serbia) Lazar Kniežević	FTC Fiľakovo	15
5	(Slovakia) Samuel Kurtulík	MŠK Námestovo	14
6	(Slovakia) Marek Bobček	MFK Ružomberok II	13
7	(Slovakia) Marcel Jass	MŠK Rimavská Sobota	11
7	(Slovakia) Martin Boďa	MŠK Fomat Martin	11
7	(Slovakia) Patrik Chovan	MŠK Námestovo/ MFK Lokomotíva Zvolen	11
10	(Slovakia) Slavomír Kapusniak	FK Čadca	10
10	(Slovakia) Lukáš Lupták	MŠK Rimavská Sobota	10
10	(Slovakia) Miroslav Antal	MFK Lokomotíva Zvolen/ Železiarne Podbrezová II	10
10	(Slovakia) Miroslav Almaský	MFK Ružomberok II	10
10	(Slovakia) Lukáš Štefanka	MFK Žarnovica	10

== TIPOS III. liga Východ ==
=== Relegated from 2. liga ===
- FK Spišská Nová Ves

=== Withdrew from 3. liga ===
- MFK Rožňava

=== Promoted from 4. liga ===
- AŠK Maria Huta (4. liga Juh (South) winners)
- FK Humenné (4. liga Sever (North) winners)

=== Locations ===
Location of teams in the 2018–19 3. Liga Východ (East)

=== League table ===
Pos	Team	Pld	W	D	L	GF	GA	GD	Pts	Promotion or relegation
1	FC Košice (C, P)	26	25	0	1	90	9	+81	75	Promotion to 2. Liga
2	Vranov nad Topľou	26	19	2	5	72	27	+45	59	
3	Humenné	26	16	2	8	54	28	+26	50	
4	Šarišské Michaľany	26	14	1	11	49	32	+17	43	
5	Spišská Nová Ves	26	11	4	11	29	45	−16	37	
6	Stropkov	26	10	5	11	34	32	+2	35	
7	Snina	26	10	3	13	39	49	−10	33	
8	Plavnica	26	9	4	13	45	51	−6	31	
9	Giraltovce	26	10	1	15	21	40	−19	31	
10	Veľké Revištia	26	8	6	12	35	46	−11	30	
11	Svidník	26	9	2	15	27	45	−18	29	
12	Bardejovská Nová Ves	26	8	5	13	44	63	−19	29	
13	Krompachy	26	9	2	15	27	40	−13	29	
14	Gelnica (R)	26	4	3	19	21	80	−59	15	Relegation to 4. liga
15	Tatran Prešov II (R)	0	0	0	0	0	0	0	0	Withdrew from the league
16	Rožňava (R)	0	0	0	0	0	0	0	0	Withdrew from the league

Source: III.LIGA VÝCHOD DOSPELÍ VSFZ
Rules for classification: 1) points; 2) goal difference; 3) number of goals scored.
(C) Champions; (P) Promoted; (R) Relegated

=== Top goalscorers ===
As of 16 June 2019.

Rank	Player	Club	Goals
1	(Ukraine) Oleh Vyshnevskyi	FK Košice/ MFK Snina	29
2	(Slovakia) Filip Serečin	FK Humenné/ FK Košice	26
3	(Slovakia) Pavol Cicman	OŠFK Šarišské Michaľany	19
4	(Serbia) Predrag Radovanović	FK Košice/ FK Humenné	14
4	(Slovakia) Pavol Bellás	MFK Vranov nad Topľou	14
4	(Slovakia) Lukáš Kulich	MFK Vranov nad Topľou	14
7	(Slovakia) Kristián Tináth	FK Družstevník Plavnica	12
8	(Slovakia) Frederik Svistun	MFK Snina	11
8	(Slovakia) František Jochman	FK POKROK SEZ Krompachy	11
10	(Slovakia) Jozef Skvašík	FK Humenné/ MFK Snina	9
10	(Slovakia) Vladimír Voroňák	FK Humenné	9
10	(Slovakia) Boris Gáll	FK Košice	9
10	(Slovakia) Ján Tináth	FK Družstevník Plavnica	9
