= Ľubomír Willwéber =

Slovak footballer

Personal information
- Full name: Ľubomír Willwéber
- Date of birth: 11 September 1992 (age 34)
- Place of birth: Banská Bystrica, Czechoslovakia
- Positions: Midfielder; centre back

Team information
- Current team: Dukla Banská Bystrica
- Number: 41

Youth career
- –2008: ŠKM SAVON Banská Bystrica
- 2008–: ŠK Badín

Senior career*
Years	Team	Apps	(Gls)
–2013	ŠK Badín		
2014	SCU Euratsfeld		
2014–2016	Jupie Podlavice Badín		
2015–2016	→ Dukla Banská Bystrica (loan)	40	(1)
2016–2018	Frýdek-Místek	43	(4)
2018–	Dukla Banská Bystrica	222	(23)
- * Club domestic league appearances and goals as of 21 September 2026

Ľubomír Willwéber (born 11 September 1992) is a Slovak footballer who currently plays for Dukla Banská Bystrica as a midfielder.

He was born in Banská Bystrica and currently captains 2. Liga club Dukla Banská Bystrica.

== Club career ==
=== Early career ===
Willwéber played in the youth categories of Dukla, but he took his first senior steps in the lower league in ŠK Badín, from where he headed for half a year to the team from Euratsfeld, a participant in the sixth Austrian league, in the spring of 2014. In the summer, he returned to Badín for half a year and then joined Dukla in February 2015. At that time, he made his first 14 starts in the Slovak First Football League, but Banská Bystrica took last place and was relegated.

Willwéber played 43 games for Czech club FK Frýdek-Místek before being transferred to Slovak side Dukla Banská Bystrica.

=== Dukla Banská Bystrica ===
In August 2018, he joined Dukla again, with whom he gradually won first sixth and then second place three times in the second league, which in the 2021/22 season meant direct promotion to the top competition, as the first league players FK Senica and ŠKF Sereď did not meet the licensing conditions.

Willwéber made his first division debut for Dukla in a 2–0 loss against MFK Zemplín Michalovce. He scored his first goal for the red and whites in a 3–2 loss against MFK Ružomberok. In 2025, Dukla were relegated to the second division.
