= Rovinka =

Rovinka Csölle
- Municipality
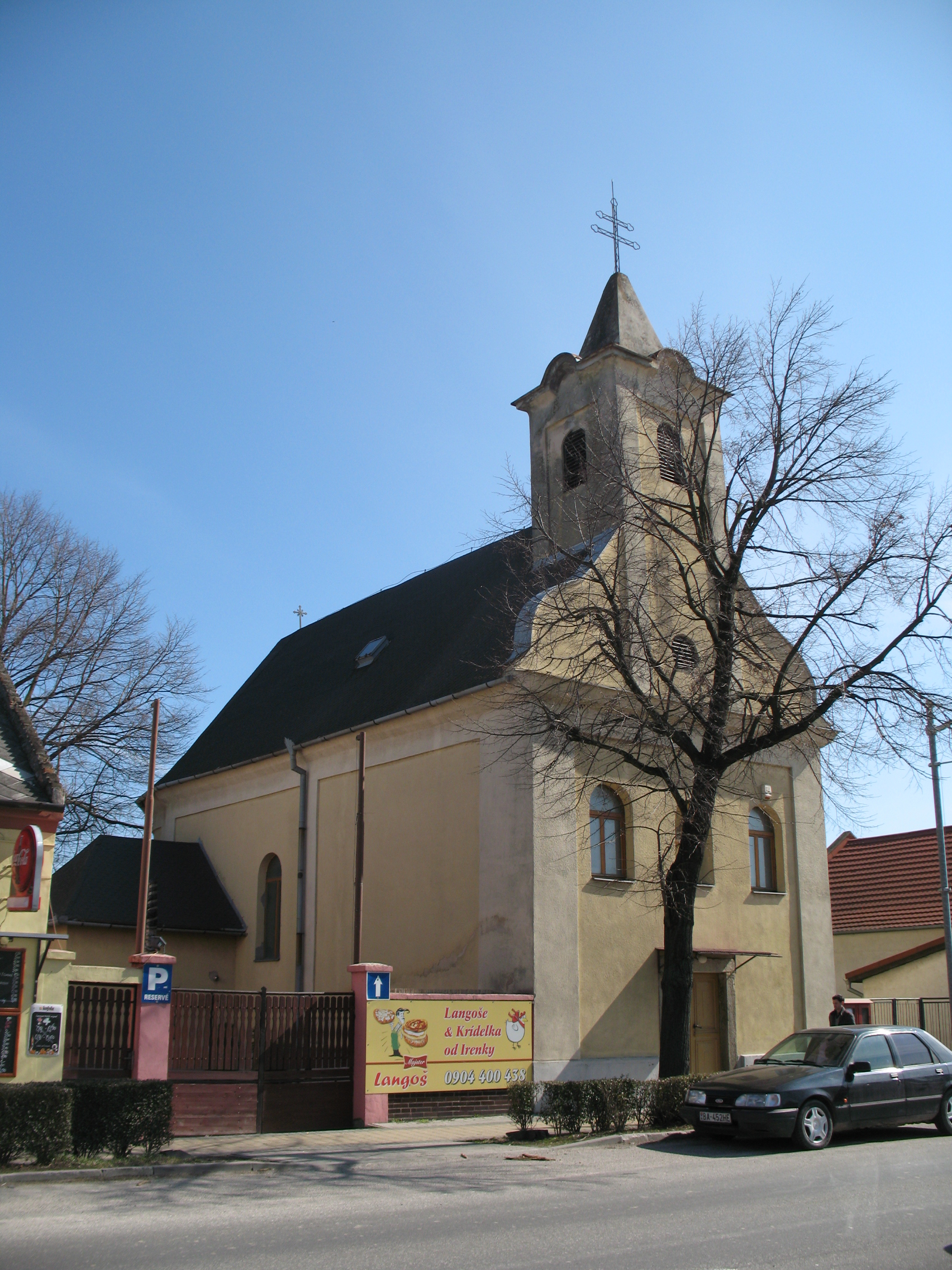
- Church of Holy Trinity

- Flag

- Location of Rovinka in the Bratislava Region Location of Rovinka in Slovakia
- Coordinates: 48.10°N 17.23°E
- Country: Slovakia
- Region: Bratislava Region
- District: Senec District
- First mentioned: 1274

Government
  - Mayor: Tomáš Káčer (ind.)

Area
  - Total: 8.85 km^{2} (3.42 sq mi)
- Elevation: 130 m (430 ft)

Population (2025)
  - Total: 6,528
- Time zone: UTC+1 (CET)
  - Summer (DST): UTC+2 (CEST)
- Postal code: 900 41
- Area code: +421 20
- Vehicle registration plate (until 2022): SC
- Website: www.obecrovinka.sk

Rovinka (Hungarian: Csölle, German: Waltersdorf) is a village and municipality in western Slovakia in Senec District in the Bratislava Region.

== History ==
In historical records the village was first mentioned in 1274. Until their expulsion in 1945 the village was inhabited by Germans.

== Geography ==
The municipality lies at an altitude of 130 metres (430 ft) and covers an area of 8.85 km^{2} (3.42 sq mi) (2025).

== Population ==
Population statistic (10 years)
Year	1995	2005	2015	2025
Count	1207	1450	3262	6528
Difference		+20.13%	+124.96%	+100.12%

Population statistic
Year	2024	2025
Count	6322	6528
Difference		+3.25%

It has a population of 6528 people (31 December 2025).

=== Ethnicity ===
Census 2021 (1+%)
Ethnicity	Number	Fraction
Slovak	4620	89.95%
Not found out	265	5.15%
Hungarian	162	3.15%
Other	67	1.3%
Czech	62	1.2%
Total	5136	

In year 2021 was 5136 people by ethnicity 4620 as Slovak, 265 as Not found out, 162 as Hungarian, 67 as Other, 62 as Czech, 33 as Rusyn, 28 as Ukrainian, 22 as Russian, 19 as German, 11 as Polish, 8 as Italian, 7 as Greek, 6 as Jewish, 5 as Chinese, 4 as Romanian, 4 as Austrian, 4 as Canadian, 4 as Croatian, 4 as Bulgarian, 3 as Albanian, 2 as Serbian, 2 as Moravian, 2 as Korean, 1 as Romani and 1 as French.

Note on population: The difference values of population numbers in the table "Population statistic" and in the sections "Ethnicity" & "Religion" is caused by the use of various statistical methods.

=== Religion ===
Census 2021 (1+%)
Religion	Number	Fraction
Roman Catholic Church	2310	44.98%
None	2091	40.71%
Not found out	260	5.06%
Evangelical Church	186	3.62%
Greek Catholic Church	81	1.58%
Total	5136	

In year 2021 was 5136 people by religion 2310 from Roman Catholic Church, 2091 from None, 260 from Not found out, 186 from Evangelical Church, 81 from Greek Catholic Church, 41 from Eastern Orthodox Church, 34 from Ad hoc movements, 23 from Islam, 20 from Jehovah's Witnesses, 18 from Christian Congregations in Slovakia, 14 from Other and not ascertained christian church, 13 from Other, 10 from Apostolic Church, 9 from Calvinist Church, 7 from Buddhism, 7 from Baptists Church, 6 from Jewish community, 2 from United Methodist Church, 1 from Hinduism, 1 from Church of the Brethren, 1 from Seventh-day Adventist Church and 1 from Church of Jesus Christ of Latter-day Saints.

According to the 2011 census, the municipality had 2,250 inhabitants. 1,998 of inhabitants were Slovaks, 78 Hungarians, 23 Czechs, 12 Germans, 1 Kazakh and 139 others and unspecified.

== Sports ==
Rovinka has a football team called TJ Rovinka which plays in the 4th liga.

== External links/Sources ==
Media related to Rovinka at Wikimedia Commons

- Official page
- Mestská a obecná Statistika SR
