= Siradji Sani =

Nigerian footballer (born 1980)

Personal information
- Date of birth: 4 February 1980 (age 46)
- Place of birth: Maradi, Niger
- Height: 1.75 m (5 ft 9 in)
- Position: Striker

Youth career
- 1997–1999: Monaco

Senior career*
| Years | Team | Apps | (Gls) |
| 1999–2001 | Luzern | 10 | (0) |
| 2001–2002 | Dubnica | 5 | (0) |
| 2002 | Inter Bratislava | 2 | (0) |
| 2003–2004 | ŽP Šport Podbrezová | | |
| 2005–2007 | DAC Dunajská Streda | 46 | (12) |
| 2005 | → Družstevník Báč (loan) | | |
| 2007 | ŽP Šport Podbrezová | 4 | (0) |
| 2008–2011 | Dolný Kubín | | |
| 2008–2009 | → Verviétois (loan) | 0 | (0) |
| 2011 | Pezinok | | |
| 2011–2012 | Blava Jaslovské Bohunice | | |
| 2012 | → Dolný Kubín (loan) | 10 | (2) |
| 2012 | Slovan Most pri Bratislave | | |
| 2013–2015 | Dolný Kubín | 0 | (0) |
| 2013 | → Slovan Most pri Bratislave (loan) | | |
| 2016 | Slovenský Grob | | |
| 2016 | Rovinka | | |
| 2017 | Slovan Most pri Bratislave | | |
| 2017–2018 | Thermál Veľký Meder | | |

International career
| –2013 | Niger | 18 | (7) |
- * Club domestic league appearances and goals

Siradji Sani (born 4 February 1980) is a Nigerien former professional footballer who played as a striker. He also holds Slovak citizenship.

== Club career ==
Sani scored 4 goals for FC DAC 1904 Dunajská Streda in a 7–1 win in the cup against Horná Kráľová.

=== Dolný Kubín ===
On 2 September 2015, Sani played in a 1–0 away win in the league against ŠKM Liptovský Hrádok, missing a penalty in the 89th minute. Later that year, Sani was a part of the MFK Dolný Kubín squad. He featured in a 5–1 defeat against FC DAC 1904 Dunajská Streda.
