= MŠK Iskra Petržalka =

Slovak football club

- Full name: MŠK Iskra Petržalka
- Founded: 1934
- Ground: Stadion na Skolodowskej ulici, Petržalka
- Capacity: 1,600
- Manager: Július Mrva
- League: 8. liga, (VIII. level)
- 2023–24: 2nd

MŠK Iskra Petržalka is a Slovak football team, based Petržalka, a borough of Bratislava. The club was founded in 1934. They played in the second-tier Slovak National Football League from the 1980–81 season under head coach František Urvay.

== Notable players ==
The following players had international caps for their respective countries. Players whose name is listed in bold represented their countries while playing for the club.

Past (and present) players who are the subjects of Wikipedia articles can be found here.

- (Central African Republic) Alias Lembakoali
