= TJ Rovinka =

Slovak football club

- Full name: TJ Rovinka
- Founded: 1947
- Ground: Štadión TJ Rovinka, Rovinka
- Capacity: 400 (80 seats)
- Chairman: (Slovakia) Ladislav Mittuch
- Head coach: (Central African Republic) Alias Lembakoali
- League: 4. liga - Bratislava
- 2025–26: 4th

TJ Rovinka is a Slovak football team, based in the town of Rovinka. The club was founded in 1947.

Rovinka played in a Super Cup at the start of the 2017–18 season, having won the Bratislava Cup the previous season. They lost to Czech side Tišnov 5–1, who had previously won the South Moravian Region Cup.

As an amateur side, Rovinka defeated Senica of the Slovak First Football League 3–2 in the third round of the 2020–21 Slovak Cup, causing an upset. Due to the COVID-19 pandemic in Slovakia, amateur clubs were expelled from the competition before the next round, so Rovinka played no further part in the cup.

Rovinka won the 4. liga, Bratislava Region in the 2022–23 season, but refused to apply for a license to play in the third-tier league for the following season, thus remaining at the fourth level.

== Notable players ==
The following players had international caps for their respective countries. Players whose name is listed in bold represented their countries while playing for Rovinka.

Past (and present) players who are the subjects of Wikipedia articles can be found here.

- (Niger) Siradji Sani

== Honours ==
- **4. Liga**
  - Winners (1): 2022–23
