= Samuel Kuc =

Slovak footballer

Personal information
- Full name: Samuel Kuc
- Date of birth: 23 March 1998 (age 28)
- Place of birth: Košice, Slovakia
- Height: 1.92 m (6 ft 4 in)
- Position: Centre-back

Team information
- Current team: Stará Ľubovňa

Youth career
- –2016: VSS Košice
- 2016–2017: Železiarne Podbrezová

Senior career*
| Years | Team | Apps | (Gls) |
| 2017–2019 | Železiarne Podbrezová B | 12 | (1) |
| 2017–2019 | Železiarne Podbrezová | 6 | (0) |
| 2018–2019 | → Liptovský Mikuláš (loan) | 19 | (0) |
| 2019–2021 | Košice | 8 | (0) |
| 2021–2023 | Stal Rzeszów | 7 | (0) |
| 2022 | → Humenné (loan) | 15 | (0) |
| 2023– | Stará Ľubovňa | | |
- * Club domestic league appearances and goals as of 23 March 2024

Samuel Kuc (born 23 March 1998) is a Slovak footballer who plays as a centre-back for Stará Ľubovňa.

== Club career ==
=== FK Železiarne Podbrezová ===
Kuc made his professional debut for Železiarne Podbrezová against ViOn Zlaté Moravce on 23 September 2017.

== Honours ==
Stal Rzeszów

- II liga: 2021–22
