= FK Slovan Most pri Bratislave =

Slovak football club

- Full name: FK Slovan Most pri Bratislave
- Founded: 1955
- Ground: Stadium Most pri Bratislave, Most pri Bratislave, Slovakia
- Capacity: 500
- Chairman: Martin Juraško
- Head coach: Peter Tóth
- League: 3. Liga
- 2018-2019: 5th
- Website: http://www.slovanmostpribratislave.sk/

FK Slovan Most pri Bratislave is a Slovak association football club located in Most pri Bratislave. It currently plays in 3. liga (3rd tier in Slovak football system). The club was founded in 1955. Its colours are blue and white.

== Notable players ==
The following players had international caps for their respective countries. Players whose name is listed in bold represented their countries while playing for Slovan.

Past (and present) players who are the subjects of Wikipedia articles can be found here.

- (Central African Republic) Alias Lembakoali
- (Niger) Siradji Sani
