= ŠK Badín =

Slovak football club

- Full name: ŠK Badín, občianske združenie
- Founded: 1932
- Ground: Hlavné ihrisko ŠK Badín
- League: 4. Liga

ŠK Badín (commonly referred to as simply Badín) is a Slovak football club based in the village of Badín in the Banská Bystrica Region of Slovakia. The club currently competes in the 4. Liga, the fourth highest level of Slovak football.

== History ==
In 2014, Badín lost a cup match against former Slovak league champions MFK Košice, a participant in the highest competition, by a close score of 0–1. In the 2021–22 season, ŠK Badín wouldn’t concede a single goal at home.

=== Recent years ===
In the 2024–25 Slovak Cup, Badín beat Lučenec after Erik Hric scored the winning goal in the 84th minute. The club would advance to the next round where they would be drawn with Slovak First Football League side FK Dukla Banská Bystrica. Badín loss the game by a close score of 1–3, drawing the game 1–1 at half-time. In August 2025, the club were drawn with 2. Liga club MFK Zvolen in the 2025–26 Slovak Cup. They would lose the game by a close score of 1–0. In a league match in 2025, the club drew 2–2 with TJ Spartak Radôstka. The equalizing goal for Badín sparked controversy, when in the 31st minute, with the score at 2–1 for Radôstka, Samuel Šipčiak stopped the Badín striker with a defensive intervention. The main referee first indicated that a corner kick would be taken. However, after a while he changed his decision and gave a penalty kick. After the match a complaint was filed to the Referees' Commission, where they decided that the referee would be banned for 3 matches and would receive a penalty.

== Ground ==
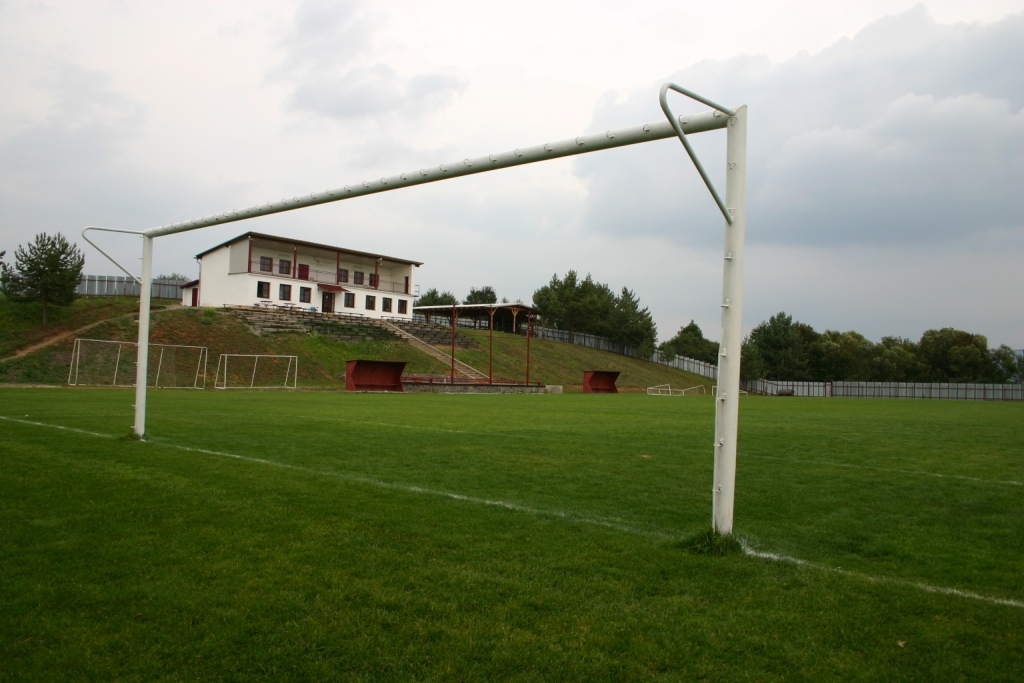
The Hlavné ihrisko ŠK Badín.

The club currently plays its home games at the Hlavné ihrisko ŠK Badín. The ground is also used for the 11 youth teams that Badín operates. Since the 2012/2013 season, in cooperation with FK Jupie Banská Bystrica Podlavice, both clubs use the ground for training both A-team players and youths. There is also another pitch and a sports hall located next to the ground that is also used by the club.

== Notable players ==
Notable players that played for ŠK Badín and later for a professional side. For the full list, see Category:ŠK Badín players.

- (Slovakia) Ľubomír Willwéber
- (Slovakia) Erik Hric
