= Jan Staško =

Czech footballer

Personal information
- Full name: Jan Staško
- Date of birth: 15 April 1993 (age 33)
- Place of birth: Czech Republic
- Height: 1.89 m (6 ft 2 1/2 in)
- Position: Forward

Senior career*
Years	Team	Apps	(Gls)
2013–2017	Baník Ostrava	12	(0)
2013–2014	→ Frýdek-Místek (loan)	14	(3)
2014–2015	→ Zvolen (loan)	18	(6)
2015	→ Frýdek-Místek (loan)	14	(0)
2015–2017	→ Zvolen (loan)	34	(13)
2017–2019	Partizán Bardejov	46	(9)
2019–2022	SK Dětmarovice	36	(15)
2022—2023	SK Stonava	9	(5)

Managerial career
- 2025—: SK Stonava juniors
- * Club domestic league appearances and goals as of 28 June 2019

Jan Staško (born 15 April 1993) is a Czech football player.

== Career ==
Ahead of the 2025 he's coaching juniors in club SK Stonava.
