= Marko Tešija =

Croatian footballer

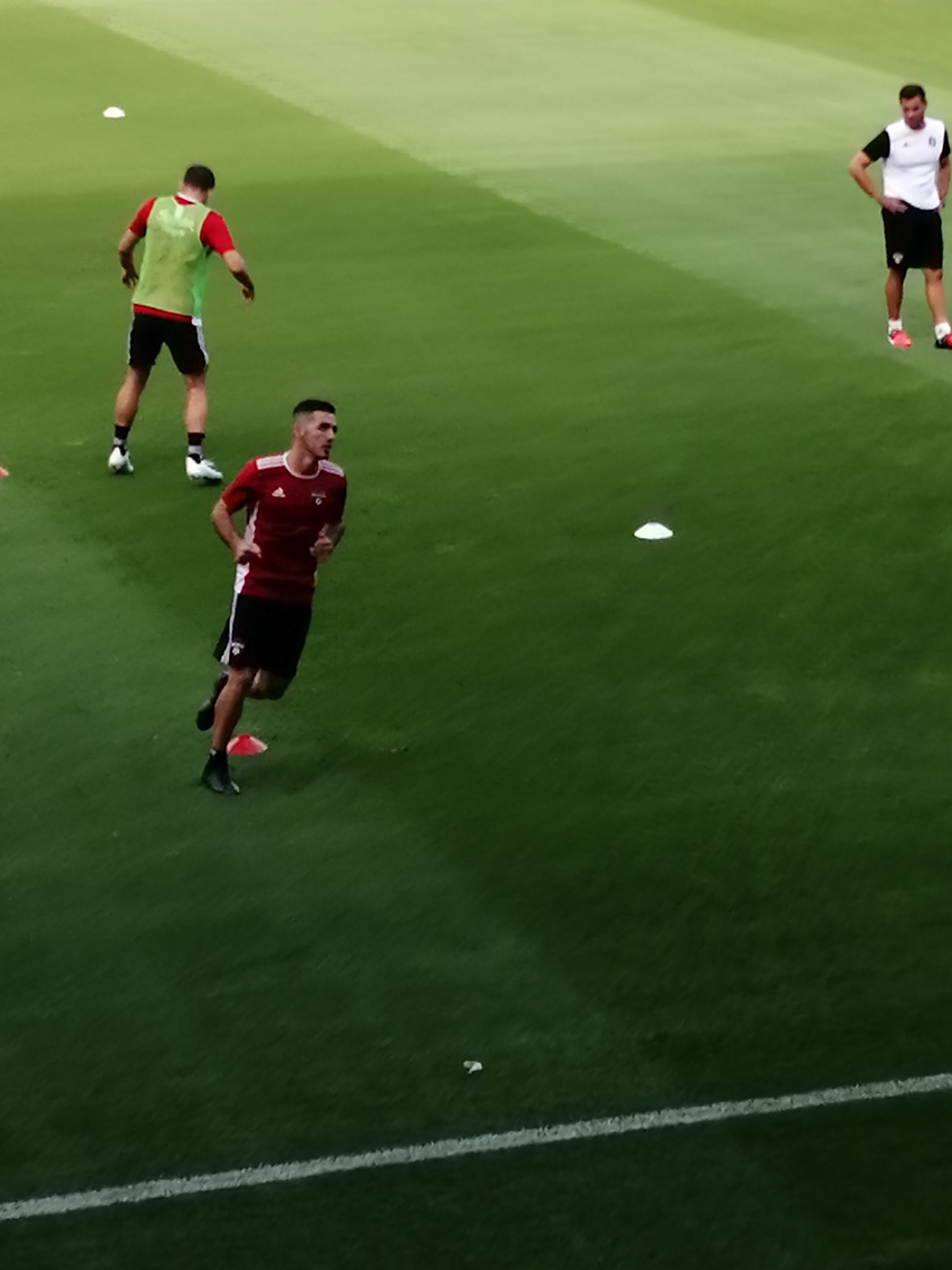

Personal information
- Date of birth: 14 January 1992 (age 34)
- Place of birth: Split, Croatia
- Height: 1.74 m (5 ft 9 in)
- Position: Midfielder

Youth career
- 2003-2011: Split

Senior career*
Years	Team	Apps	(Gls)
2010–2012	Split	11	(0)
2012–2014	Dugopolje	26	(3)
2014	Zadar	9	(0)
2015	Zrinjski Mostar	0	(0)
2015–2017	Zagreb	50	(5)
2017	Rudeš	0	(0)
2017	Dugopolje	17	(1)
2018	Gorica	14	(0)
2018–2019	Senica	28	(3)
2019–2020	Spartak Trnava	26	(2)
2020–2021	Xanthi	12	(0)
2021–2022	Zrinjski	7	(0)
2022	FC Brașov	8	(1)
2022–2024	Dugopolje	71	(5)
2025	Ilvamaddalena 1903	11	(2)
2025	ACR Messina	13	(1)
2026	Solin	14	(1)

International career
2011	Croatia U19	1	(0)
2011–2012	Croatia U20	6	(0)
- * Club domestic league appearances and goals as of 12 July 2026

Marko Tešija (born 14 January 1992) is a Croatian professional footballer who last played as a midfielder for Solin.

== Club career ==
=== FK Senica ===
Tešija made his professional Fortuna Liga debut for Senica against FC Spartak Trnava on 21 July 2018.
