= Alias Lembakoali =

Centrafrican footballer

Personal information
- Full name: Alias Emery Lembakoali
- Date of birth: 27 March 1971 (age 55)
- Place of birth: Central African Republic
- Height: 1.74 m (5 ft 8 1/2 in)
- Position: Striker

Senior career*
Years	Team	Apps	(Gls)
–1997	Žilina		
1997	Nové Mesto nad Váhom		
1997–2001	Matador Púchov	34	(18)
2001–2005	Inter Bratislava	99	(23)
2005–2006	SC Eisenstadt	28	(9)
2006–2007	Parndorf	6	(0)
2007	UFC Mannersdorf		
2009–2010	Iskra Petržalka		
2010–2017	Slovan Most pri Bratislave		

International career
2000	Central African Republic	1	(0)
- * Club domestic league appearances and goals as of 14 July 2011

Alias "Ali" Lembakoali (born 27 March 1971) is a Central African retired professional footballer who played as a striker.

== Career ==
In July 1997, he joined Slovak club FK Matador Púchov. In next time Ali played for the Slovak champion club Inter Bratislava and Austrian clubs SC Eisenstadt, SC-ESV Parndorf 1919, UFC Mannersdorf from lower leagues. Lembakoali became the "face" of the civic association People Against Racism (ĽPR) and the International Football Against Racism in Europe (FARE).
