= Lukáš Micherda =

Slovak footballer

Personal information
- Full name: Lukáš Micherda
- Date of birth: 29 September 1994 (age 32)
- Place of birth: Spišská Nová Ves, Slovakia
- Height: 1.79 m (5 ft 10 in)
- Position: Defender

Team information
- Current team: Odeva Lipany
- Number: 29

Youth career
- –2009: Pokrok Krompachy
- 2009: → Tatran Prešov (loan)
- 2010–2013: Tatran Prešov

Senior career*
Years	Team	Apps	(Gls)
2014–2018	Tatran Prešov	82	(5)
2019–2020	Partizán Bardejov	13	(0)
2019–2020	→ Odeva Lipany (loan)		
2020–	Odeva Lipany		
- * Club domestic league appearances and goals as of 8 January 2020

Lukáš Micherda (born 29 September 1994) is a Slovak football defender who currently plays for Odeva Lipany.

== Career ==
=== Club career ===
Micherda made his professional Fortuna Liga debut for Tatran Prešov against Ružomberok, on 16 July 2016.

Micherda joined Partizán Bardejov in January 2019. On 3 August 2019 Odeva Lipany announced, that Micharda had joined the club on loan. He continued at Odeva Lipany the following season. As of May 2024, Micherda was still playing for Odeva Lipany.
