= Róbert Richnák =

Slovak footballer

Personal information
- Full name: Róbert Richnák
- Date of birth: 3 May 1992 (age 34)
- Place of birth: Dolné Zelenice, Czechoslovakia
- Height: 1.82 m (6 ft 0 in)
- Position: Midfielder

Team information
- Current team: OŠK Šúrovce

Youth career
- Spartak Trnava

Senior career*
Years	Team	Apps	(Gls)
2013–2016	Spartak Trnava	10	(0)
2015	→ ŽP Šport Podbrezová (loan)	3	(0)
2017–2019	iClinic Sereď	44	(5)
2019–2020	Petržalka	7	(0)
2020–2023	Dynamo Malženice		
2023–	OŠK Šúrovce		
- * Club domestic league appearances and goals as of 12:53, February 16, 2026 (UTC)

Róbert Richnák (born 3 May 1992) is a Slovak footballer who plays for OFK Surovce as a midfielder. He is also a youth coach for former club, Spartak Trnava.

== Club career ==
=== Spartak Trnava ===
Richnák is a product of the Spartak Trnava youth academy. At a young age, he was given the chance to train with the A-team. Following good performances, head coach Juraj Jarábek promoted him to the first-team. Richnák made his league debut for Spartak Trnava against Dunajská Streda on 17 September 2013. Coming on off the bench in the 83rd minute, he would not make an impact to the final score of 4–1 to Spartak. In June 2014, he signed a two-year extension to his contract with the club.

==== Podbrezová (loan) ====
After falling out of favor at Spartak, Richnák was rumored to be joining ŽP Šport Podbrezová, where he would eventually transfer to in January 2015. He debuted for the side in a 2–1 loss against ŠK Slovan Bratislava, playing 69 minutes of the game before being substituted off for Dávid Škutka.
