= Erik Hric =

Slovak footballer

Personal information
- Full name: Erik Hric
- Date of birth: 24 September 1997 (age 29)
- Place of birth: Banská Bystrica, Slovakia
- Position: Midfielder

Team information
- Current team: ŠK Badín

Youth career
- 2006–2011: ŠK Badín
- 2011–2015: Dukla Banská Bystrica

Senior career*
Years	Team	Apps	(Gls)
2015	Dukla Banská Bystrica	9	(0)
2017–2019	Železiarne Podbrezová B	13	(1)
2018–2019	→ Zvolen (loan)	27	(16)
2019–2020	Zvolen	11	(6)
2020–2023	Prameň Kováčová	4	(3)
2023–	ŠK Badín		

International career
2012	Slovakia U16	1	(0)
2013–2014	Slovakia U17	3	(0)
2014	Slovakia U18	1	(0)
- * Club domestic league appearances and goals as of 29 September 2020

Erik Hric (born 24 September 1997) is a Slovak footballer who currently plays for amateur side ŠK Badín, as midfielder.

== Club career ==
=== Early career and Dukla Banská Bystrica ===
Hric was born on September 24, 1997 in Banská Bystrica. He started playing football at the age of 5 at local club ŠK Badín, where he would later transfer to the academy of Dukla Banská Bystrica. Hric is a graduate of the Dukla Banská Bystrica youth academy. He won the youth league with the under-17 side. He scored his first goal for the club in a 1–1 preparation draw against Lokomotíva Zvolen, opening the score in the 38th minute. Hric made his professional league debut for Dukla Banská Bystrica on 6 March 2015 against Spartak Trnava, coming on off the bench as a substitute in the 90th minute for Róbert Polievka.

=== Loan to Zvolen ===
In 2018, Hric joined third league side MFK Zvolen on loan from FK Železiarne Podbrezová B. After the spring part of the season, he was one of the most important team players. He scored seven goals and was an important part of coach Miloš Foltán's squad.

=== ŠK Badín ===
In 2023, Hric transferred to 4. Liga club ŠK Badín. In the second round of the 2024–25 Slovak Cup, he scored the winning goal against Lučenec in the 84th minute to seal a 1–0 win, advancing to the next round. Badín would be drawn wil first league club FK Dukla Banská Bystrica, a team which was led by Hric’s uncle and godfather Marek Bažík. Dukla won the game 3–1 after drawing 1–1 at half-time.

== International career ==
Hric scored his first goal for the under-17s in a 3–0 friendly victory against the Ireland national under-17 football team. He later also made appearances for the Slovakia national under-18 football team, and the under-19’s.
