= Michel Meda =

Cameroonian footballer (born 2000)

Personal information
- Full name: Michel Abomo Meda
- Date of birth: 24 December 2000 (age 25)
- Place of birth: Nantes, France
- Height: 1.94 m (6 ft 4 in)
- Positions: Centre back; defensive midfielder

Youth career
- AS Fortuna

Senior career*
Years	Team	Apps	(Gls)
–2019	AS Fortuna		
2019–2020	Pohronie	4	(0)
2020–2021	Stade Mayennais	?	(?)
2021–	Bourges Foot 18 B	?	(?)
2022–2023	Philbertine	?	(?)
2023–	Cholet B	?	(?)
- * Club domestic league appearances and goals as of 17 August 2020

Michel Meda (born 24 December 2000) is a Cameroonian football defender who currently plays for Cholet B.

== Club career ==
=== FK Pohronie ===
Meda joined Pohronie early September 2019. He made his professional Fortuna Liga debut for Pohronie against Senica on 28 September 2019, in an away fixture at OMS Arena. Meda had replaced Ján Dzúrik in the 87th minute of the match, shortly after Samson Akinyoola had scored the match's only goal, guaranteeing a narrow win for the home side.

Meda had helped the club retain the top division allegiance for the next season but was released from the club ahead of it.
