= Martin Luberda =

Slovak footballer

Personal information
- Full name: Martin Luberda
- Date of birth: 18 December 1991 (age 34)
- Place of birth: Czechoslovakia
- Height: 1.94 m (6 ft 4 in)
- Position: Defender

Team information
- Current team: Stropkov

Youth career
- Tatran Prešov

Senior career*
Years	Team	Apps	(Gls)
2013–2018	Tatran Prešov	58	(7)
2019–2020	Poprad	17	(0)
2020	Tatran Prešov		
2021–2022	Humenné	26	(2)
2023–	Stropkov		
- * Club domestic league appearances and goals as of 20 January 2023

Martin Luberda (born 18 December 1991) is a Slovak football defender who currently plays for MŠK Tesla Stropkov.

== Club career ==
=== 1. FC Tatran Prešov ===
Luberda made his professional Fortuna Liga debut for Tatran Prešov against Ružomberok on 16 July 2016.
