= Viktor Vondryska =

Slovak footballer

Personal information
- Date of birth: 12 March 2001 (age 25)
- Place of birth: Bratislava, Slovakia
- Height: 1.90 m (6 ft 3 in)
- Position: Forward

Team information
- Current team: SV Horn
- Number: 14

Youth career
- 2008–2014: Slovan Ivanka pri Dunaji
- 2014–2016: Senec
- 2016–2018: FKM Karlova Ves Bratislava
- 2018–2019: Pohronie
- 2019–2020: → Podbrezová (loan)

Senior career*
Years	Team	Apps	(Gls)
2018–2020	Pohronie	12	(0)
2019–2020	→ Podbrezová (loan)	8	(0)
2021	Petržalka	14	(3)
2021	SC Melk	3	(2)
2022	Rohožník	8	(0)
2022–2023	Hamsik Academy		
2023	RKC Third Coast		
2023–2025	ASK Ybbs	30	(10)
2025	SV Leithaprodersdorf	15	(8)
2026–	SV Horn	8	(1)

International career
2020	Slovakia U19	2	(0)
- * Club domestic league appearances and goals as of 18:58, 10 June 2023 (UTC)

Viktor Vondryska (born 12 March 2001) is a Slovak professional footballer who plays as a forward for SV Horn.
