= Kevaughn Atkinson =

Jamaican footballer (born 1995)

Personal information
- Full name: Kevaughn St. Michael Atkinson
- Date of birth: 11 November 1995 (age 31)
- Place of birth: Jamaica
- Position: Forward

Senior career*
Years	Team	Apps	(Gls)
	Sporting Central Academy F.C.		(1+)
2016-2017	Mosta F.C.	6	(0)
2017-2019/20	St. Andrews F.C.	32+	(11+)
2018/2019	FK Senica	2	(0)
2019/2020	SC Austria Lustenau	0	(0)
2020-	Senglea Athletic F.C.	10	(2)
- * Club domestic league appearances and goals

Kevaughn St. Michael Atkinson (born 11 November 1995 in Jamaica) is a Jamaican footballer.

== Career ==
As a youth player, Atkinson traveled with his brother, Jamaican international Leon Bailey, and adoptive father, Craig Butler, to Europe, where they played for the youth teams of Austrian club USK Anif as well K.R.C. Genk before he returned to Jamaica with Sporting Central Academy.

In 2016, he signed for Maltese side Mosta.

In 2017, Atkinson signed for St. Andrews in Malta.

For the second half of 2018/19, he was sent on loan to Slovak top flight team FK Senica.

In 2019, he was sent on loan to SC Austria Lustenau in the Austrian second division, failing to make an appearance there.

In 2020, Atkinson returned to Malta with Senglea Athletic.
