= Matej Dybala =

Slovak footballer (born 1999)

Personal information
- Date of birth: 16 July 1999 (age 27)
- Place of birth: Bytča, Slovakia
- Height: 1.84 m (6 ft 0 in)
- Position: Centre-back

Team information
- Current team: VfB Auerbach
- Number: 5

Youth career
- –2012: FO Kinex Bytča
- 2013–2015: Žilina

Senior career*
Years	Team	Apps	(Gls)
2016–2019	Žilina B	5	(0)
2018	→ Partizán Bardejov (loan)	11	(0)
2019	→ iClinic Sereď (loan)	1	(0)
2019–2021	MAS Táborsko	26	(0)
2021–2022	Považská Bystrica		
2022–	VfB Auerbach	9	(0)

International career
2015	Slovakia U17	1	(0)
- * Club domestic league appearances and goals as of 12 November 2022

Matej Dybala (born 16 July 1999) is a Slovak football defender who plays for German club VfB Auerbach.

== Club career ==
=== ŠKF Sereď ===
Dybala made his professional Fortuna Liga debut for iClinic Sereď against Zemplín Michalovce on 4 May 2019.

=== MAS Táborsko ===
In September 2019, Dybala joined MAS Táborsko.
