= AŠK Maria Huta =

Slovak football club

- Full name: Amatérsky Športový Klub Maria Huta
- Founded: 2009
- Ground: AŠK Maria Huta Stadium, Gelnica
- Capacity: 700 (200 seats)
- Head coach: Ľuboš Marcinko
- League: 3. Liga
- 2017–18: 1st (East-South) (promoted)
- Website: http://www.askmariahuta.estranky.sk/

AŠK Maria Huta is a Slovak football team, based in the town of Gelnica. The club was founded in 2009. Club colours are orange and black.

== History ==
The idea to form the club originated in May 2009 when independent individuals, including Mr. Jurtinus Pavel and Mr. Šima Martin, approached Mr. Marcinko Ľuboš. The club's formation took shape on July 1, 2009, with its first meeting. By August 2009, the club's official name, "Amateur Sports Club Maria Huta," was finalized with the involvement of Mr. Marcinko Ľuboš and Mr. Jankovský Miroslav.

The founding assembly of the club took place in September 2009, and the club was officially registered on October 7, 2009, with the Ministry of the Interior of the Slovak Republic. In May 2010, the club was accepted as a member of the Slovak Football Association (SFZ).

The first executive committee of the Amateur Sports Club Maria Huta included Mr. Marcinko Ľuboš as chairman, Mr. Jurtinus Pavel and Mr. Pavúk Peter as vice-chairmen, and committee members Mr. Homoľa Jozef, Mr. Somentál Ján Sr., Mr. Vilčko Vladimár, and Mr. Vilčko Juraj.
