= José Casado =

Spanish footballer (born 1988)

Personal information
- Full name: José David Casado García
- Date of birth: 14 January 1988 (age 38)
- Place of birth: Almería, Spain
- Height: 1.85 m (6 ft 1 in)
- Position: Midfielder

Youth career
- Psiqui CF
- Pavia
- –2002: Los Molinos
- 2003–2005: Barcelona
- 2005–2006: Sevilla
- 2006–2007: Granada 74

Senior career*
Years	Team	Apps	(Gls)
2007	Vícar Cultural	10	(0)
2008	Lorca Deportiva B		
2011–2012	Comarca de Níjar	36	(8)
2012	CD Huércal	17	(2)
2013–2014	Kazincbarcikai	14	(4)
2014	Gabčíkovo		
2014–2015	Spartak Trnava	45	(2)
2016	Botoșani	9	(0)
2016	Příbram	2	(0)
2017–2018	Español Karlsruhe		
2018	ViOn Zlaté Moravce	15	(1)
2019	Zemplín Michalovce	11	(1)
2019	Peña Deportiva	5	(0)
2020–2021	ASU Politehnica	19	(1)
2021	Zemplín Michalovce	4	(0)
2022	Slavoj Trebišov	13	(1)
- * Club domestic league appearances and goals as of 19:33, 18 January 2022 (UTC)

José David Casado García (born 14 January 1988) is a Spanish footballer.

== Club career ==
In July 2014, he signed a 2-year contract with Spartak Trnava. He made his league debut for them on 13 July 2014 against Zlaté Moravce.
