= Adrián Leško =

Slovak footballer

Personal information
- Full name: Adrián Leško
- Date of birth: 24 July 1995 (age 31)
- Place of birth: Bardejov, Slovakia
- Height: 1.78 m (5 ft 10 in)
- Positions: Attacking midfielder; forward

Team information
- Current team: Bardejov

Youth career
- FK Raslavice
- –2011: Bardejov
- 2012–2013: Michalovce

Senior career*
Years	Team	Apps	(Gls)
2012–2018	Michalovce	43	(4)
2015–2016	→ Lokomotíva Košice (loan)	23	(8)
2017	→ Lipany (loan)	13	(3)
2018	→ Prešov (loan)	23	(5)
2019	Lokomotíva Košice	12	(1)
2019–	Bardejov	15	(1)
2020	→ Trebišov (loan)	1	(0)
2020–2021	→ Tesla Stropkov (loan)		

International career
2011–2012	Slovakia U–17	3	(0)
2013–2014	Slovakia U–19	2	(0)
- * Club domestic league appearances and goals as of 16:36, 13 June 2021 (UTC)

Adrián Leško (born 24 July 1995), is a Slovak professional footballer who plays for Partizán Bardejov as a midfielder.

== Honours ==
Leško won the 2014–15 DOXXbet liga with the MFK Zemplín Michalovce.

== Club career ==
Leško was born in Bardejov in Slovakia. He made his senior debut for MFK Zemplín Michalovce at the age of 16, eleven months and 13 days, on 23 May 2012 against FK Bodva Moldava nad Bodvou, entering in as a substitute in place of Jaroslav Dargaj. He made his professional Fortuna Liga debut for MFK Zemplín Michalovce against FK AS Trenčín on 18 July 2015.
