= Gabriel Capixaba =

Brazilian footballer (born 1998)

Personal information
- Full name: Gabriel Pereira Minas
- Date of birth: 5 March 1998 (age 28)
- Place of birth: Cachoeiro de Itapemirim, Brazil
- Height: 1.72 m (5 ft 8 in)
- Position: Forward

Youth career
- –2019: Fluminense

Senior career*
| Years | Team | Apps | (Gls) |
| 2019–2020 | Fluminense | 2 | (1) |
| 2019 | → Šamorín (loan) | 9 | (0) |
| 2021 | Amora | 10 | (2) |
- * Club domestic league appearances and goals as of 3 May 2021

Gabriel Pereira Minas (born 5 March 1998), commonly known as Gabriel Capixaba, is a Brazilian footballer who plays as a forward.

== Career statistics ==
=== Club ===
As of 7 June 2020.

| Club | Season | League | | | State league | | Cup | | Continental | | Other | | Total | |
| Club | Season | Division | Apps | Goals | Apps | Goals | Apps | Goals | Apps | Goals | Apps | Goals | Apps | Goals |
|---|---|---|---|---|---|---|---|---|---|---|---|---|---|---|
| Fluminense | 2019 | Série A | 0 | 0 | 0 | 0 | 0 | 0 | 0 | 0 | 0 | 0 | 0 | 0 |
| Fluminense | 2020 | Série A | 0 | 0 | 2 (Note: Appearances in the Campeonato Carioca) | 1 | 0 | 0 | 0 | 0 | 0 | 0 | 2 | 1 |
| Fluminense | Total | | 0 | 0 | 2 | 1 | 0 | 0 | 0 | 0 | 0 | 0 | 2 | 1 |
| Šamorín (loan) | 2018–19 | 2. Liga | 9 | 0 | – | | 0 | 0 | – | | 0 | 0 | 9 | 0 |
| Career total | | | 9 | 0 | 2 | 1 | 0 | 0 | 0 | 0 | 0 | 0 | 11 | 1 |
