= Zubak =

Zubak may refer to:

- Zubák, a village and municipality in Slovakia
- Zubak (surname), a Slavic surname

== See also ==
- Zubac, a Slavic surname
- Zobak coal mine, in Hungary
