= Matej Náther =

Slovak footballer

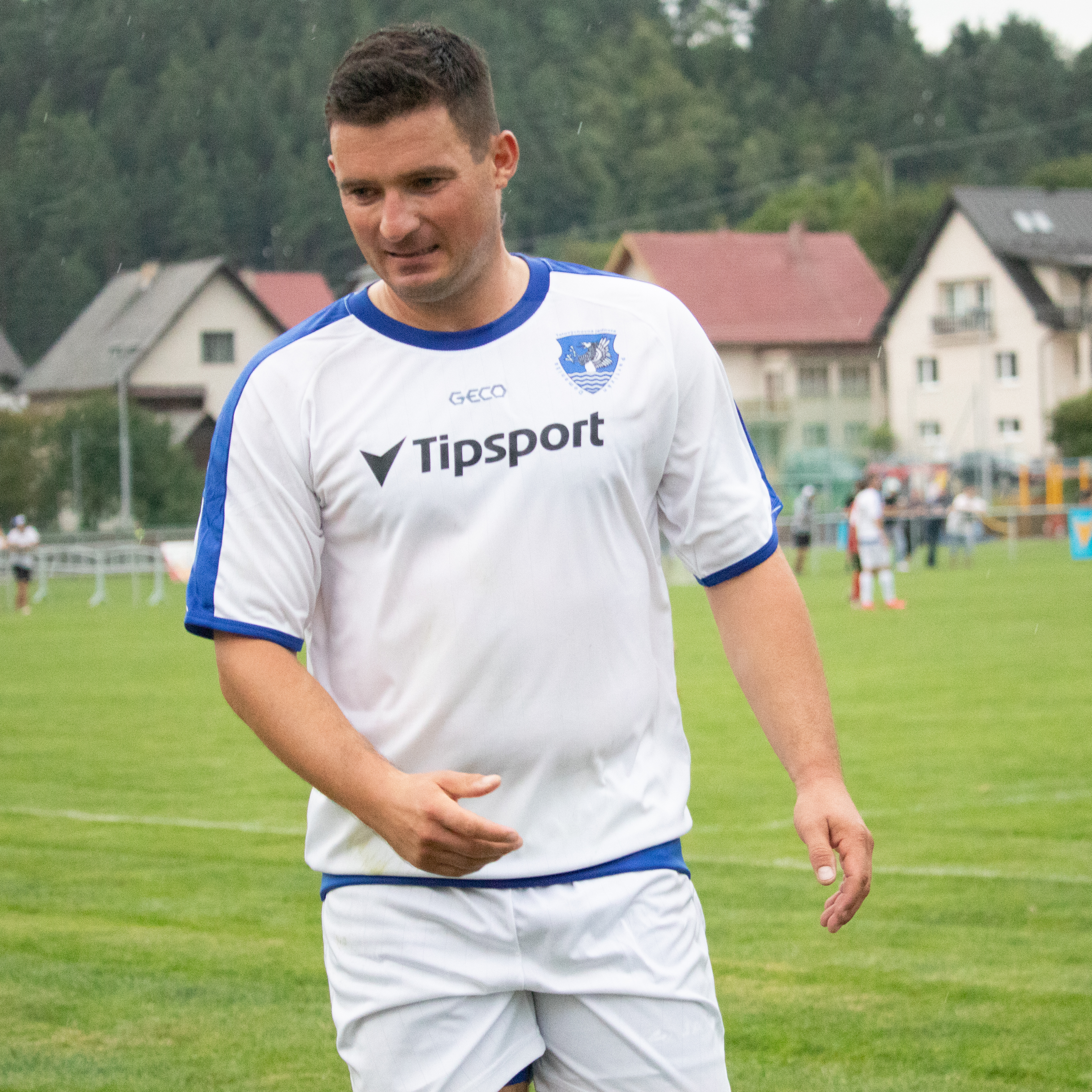

Personal information
- Full name: Matej Náther
- Date of birth: 23 July 1985 (age 41)
- Place of birth: Martin, Czechoslovakia
- Height: 1.73 m (5 ft 8 in)
- Position: Centre midfielder

Senior career*
| Years | Team | Apps | (Gls) |
- Martin
- Trenčín
| 2004–2008 | Púchov | | |
| 2008–2011 | ViOn Zlaté Moravce | 69 | (4) |
| 2011–2013 | Podbeskidzie | 28 | (0) |
| 2013 | Zawisza Bydgoszcz | 8 | (0) |
| 2013–2016 | Sandecja Nowy Sącz | 91 | (2) |
| 2016–2017 | Borčice | | |
| 2018–2020 | Lednické Rovne | | |

Managerial career
- 2021–2023: Lednické Rovne
- * Club domestic league appearances and goals

Matej Náther (born 23 July 1985) is a Slovak former professional footballer who played as a midfielder.

== Career ==
In February 2011, he joined Podbeskidzie Bielsko-Biała on a three-year contract which will apply from 1 July 2011.

After his professional career he established his football academy called Football Academy Matej Náther (FAMN). It is situated in Dolné Kočkovce, near Púchov.

== Honours ==
Zawisza Bydgoszcz

- I liga: 2012–13
