= Hugolín Gavlovič =

Slovak priest, Baroque writer

Hugolín Gavlovič (born as Martin Gavlovič) (11 November 1712, Czarny Dunajec – 4 June 1787, Horovce) was a Slovak Franciscan priest who authored religious, moral, and educational writings in the contemporary West Slovak vernacular, and was a prominent representative of baroque literature in Slovakia.

== Career ==
He wrote didactical-reflexive poetry. His works are written in a West Slovak vernacular which "is situated temporally as well as linguistically between the systems described by Pavel Doležal and by Anton Bernolák" (Ďurovič "The Language of Walaska Sskola" 659). His most famous piece of work is Valašská škola, mravúv stodola (originally published under the name Walaska Sskola Mrawuw Stodola), a work of 17,862 verses, nearly all in fourteen syllables, as well as numerous versified couplet-marginalia.
