= Horovce =

Horovce may refer to:

- Horovce, Michalovce District, village in Slovakia
- Horovce, Púchov District, village in Slovakia
