= Zubak (surname) =

Zubák or Zubak is a surname. Notable people with this surname include:

- Ethan Zubak (born 1998), American soccer player
- Ivica Zubak (born 1978), Croatian-Swedish film director, screenwriter and producer
- Krešimir Zubak (born 1947), Croatian Politician

== See also ==
- Zubák
- Zubac
