= Horná Breznica =

- Municipality
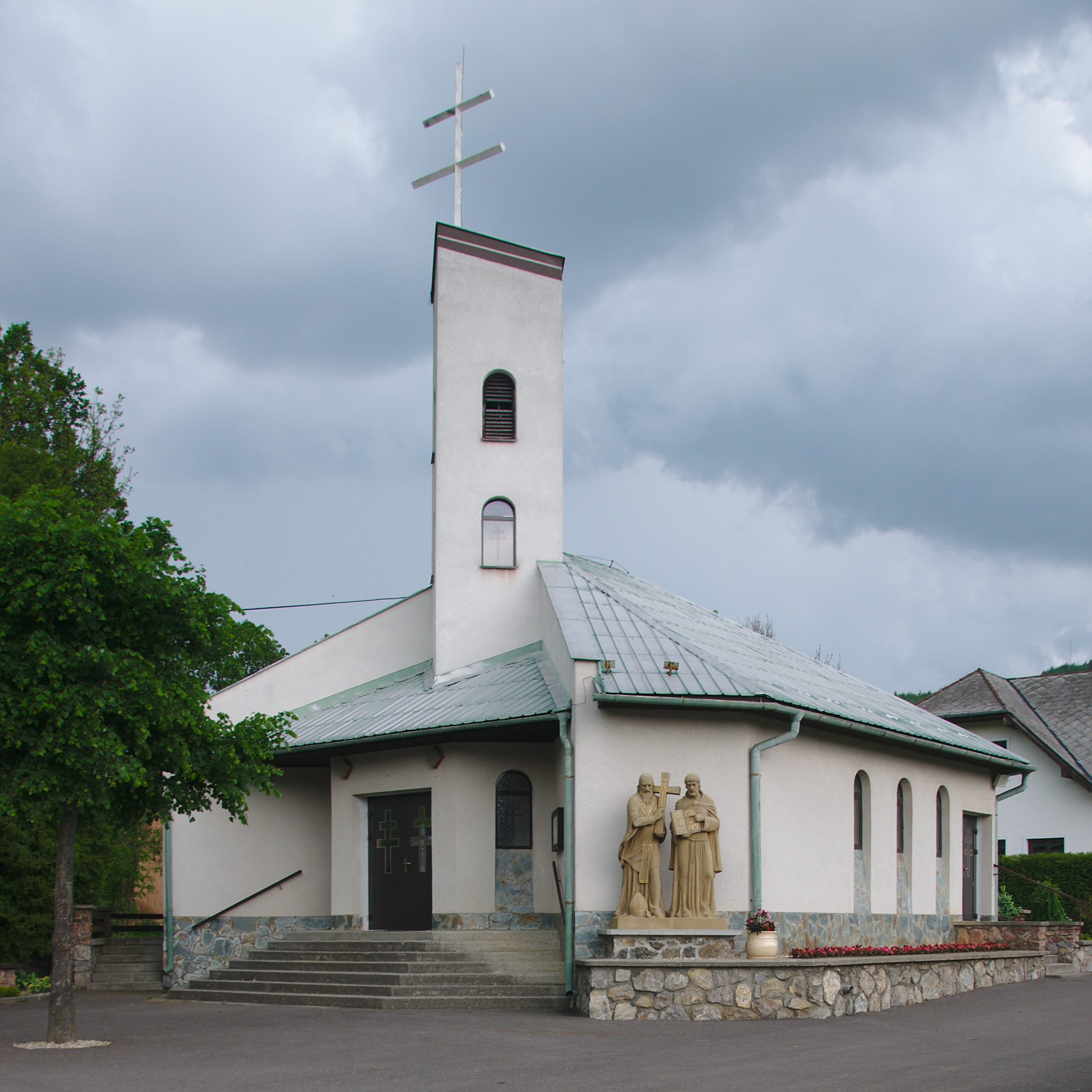
- Saints Cyril and Methodius church

- Flag Coat of arms

- Location of Horná Breznica in the Trenčín Region Location of Horná Breznica in Slovakia
- Coordinates: 49.12°N 18.25°E
- Country: Slovakia
- Region: Trenčín Region
- District: Púchov District
- First mentioned: 1388

Area
  - Total: 12.27 km^{2} (4.74 sq mi)
- Elevation: 334 m (1,096 ft)

Population (2025)
  - Total: 500
- Time zone: UTC+1 (CET)
  - Summer (DST): UTC+2 (CEST)
- Postal code: 206 1
- Area code: +421 42
- Vehicle registration plate (until 2022): PU
- Website: hornabreznica.eu

Horná Breznica (Hungarian: Felsőnyíresd) is a village and municipality in Púchov District in the Trenčín Region of north-western Slovakia.

== History ==
In historical records, the village was first mentioned in 1388.

== Geography ==
The municipality lies at an altitude of 334 metres (1,096 ft) and covers an area of 12.27 km^{2} (4.74 sq mi) (2025).

== Population ==
Population statistic (10 years)
Year	1995	2005	2015	2025
Count	457	456	480	500
Difference		−0.21%	+5.26%	+4.16%

Population statistic
Year	2024	2025
Count	497	500
Difference		+0.60%

It has a population of 500 people (31 December 2025).

=== Ethnicity ===
Census 2021 (1+ %)
Ethnicity	Number	Fraction
Slovak	495	98.01%
Not found out	14	2.77%
Total	505	

In year 2021 was 505 people by ethnicity 495 as Slovak, 14 as Not found out, 1 as German and 1 as Hungarian.

Note on population: The difference values of population numbers in the table "Population statistic" and in the sections "Ethnicity" & "Religion" is caused by the use of various statistical methods.

=== Religion ===
Census 2021 (1+ %)
Religion	Number	Fraction
Roman Catholic Church	448	88.71%
None	34	6.73%
Not found out	9	1.78%
Evangelical Church	6	1.19%
Total	505	

In year 2021 was 505 people by religion 448 from Roman Catholic Church, 34 from None, 9 from Not found out, 6 from Evangelical Church, 3 from Christian Congregations in Slovakia, 2 from Islam, 2 from Greek Catholic Church and 1 from Buddhism.

== Genealogical resources ==
The records for genealogical research are available at the state archive "Statny Archiv in Bytca, Slovakia"

- Roman Catholic church records (births/marriages/deaths): 1714-1896 (parish B)

== See also ==
- List of municipalities and towns in Slovakia
