= Vydrná =

- Municipality
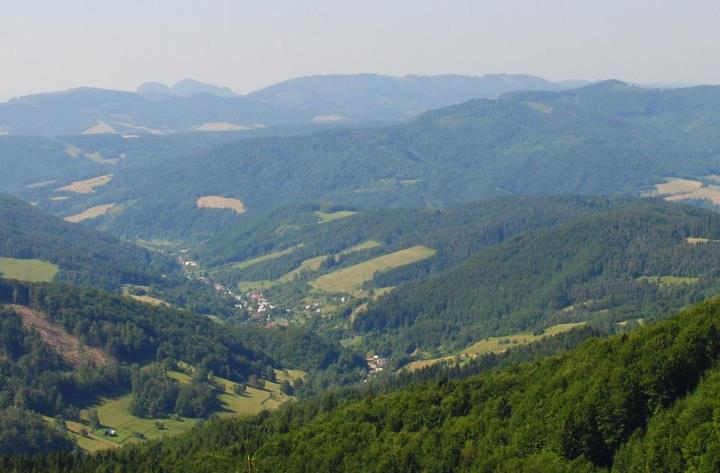

- Flag

- Location of Vydrná in the Trenčín Region Location of Vydrná in Slovakia
- Coordinates: 49.22°N 18.25°E
- Country: Slovakia
- Region: Trenčín Region
- District: Púchov District
- First mentioned: 1475

Area
  - Total: 13.43 km^{2} (5.19 sq mi)
- Elevation: 409 m (1,342 ft)

Population (2025)
  - Total: 252
- Time zone: UTC+1 (CET)
  - Summer (DST): UTC+2 (CEST)
- Postal code: 205 3
- Area code: +421 42
- Vehicle registration plate (until 2022): PU
- Website: www.vydrna.sk

Vydrná (Hungarian: Vidornya) is a village and municipality in Púchov District in the Trenčín Region of north-western Slovakia.

== History ==
In historical records the village was first mentioned in 1475.

== Geography ==
The municipality lies at an altitude of 409 metres (1,342 ft) and covers an area of 13.43 km^{2} (5.19 sq mi) (2025).

== Population ==
Population statistic (10 years)
Year	1995	2005	2015	2025
Count	359	346	322	252
Difference		−3.62%	−6.93%	−21.73%

Population statistic
Year	2024	2025
Count	252	252
Difference		+0%

It has a population of 252 people (31 December 2025).

=== Ethnicity ===
Census 2021 (1+ %)
Ethnicity	Number	Fraction
Slovak	296	99.66%
Czech	3	1.01%
Total	297	

In year 2021 was 297 people by ethnicity 296 as Slovak, 3 as Czech, 2 as Not found out, 2 as Other, 1 as Ukrainian and 1 as Romani.

Note on population: The difference values of population numbers in the table "Population statistic" and in the sections "Ethnicity" & "Religion" is caused by the use of various statistical methods.

=== Religion ===
Census 2021 (1+ %)
Religion	Number	Fraction
Evangelical Church	199	67%
Roman Catholic Church	63	21.21%
None	29	9.76%
Total	297	

In year 2021 was 297 people by religion 199 from Evangelical Church, 63 from Roman Catholic Church, 29 from None, 2 from Other and not ascertained christian church, 2 from Ad hoc movements, 1 from Not found out and 1 from Greek Catholic Church.
