= Streženice =

- Municipality
- Flag

- Location of Streženice in the Trenčín Region Location of Streženice in Slovakia
- Coordinates: 49.10°N 18.30°E
- Country: Slovakia
- Region: Trenčín Region
- District: Púchov District
- First mentioned: 1408

Area
  - Total: 7.98 km^{2} (3.08 sq mi)
- Elevation: 254 m (833 ft)

Population (2025)
  - Total: 1,117
- Time zone: UTC+1 (CET)
  - Summer (DST): UTC+2 (CEST)
- Postal code: 200 1
- Area code: +421 42
- Vehicle registration plate (until 2022): PU
- Website: www.obecstrezenice.sk

Streženice (Hungarian: Kebeles) is a village and municipality in Púchov District in the Trenčín Region of north-western Slovakia.

== History ==
In historical records the village was first mentioned in 1408.

== Geography ==
The municipality lies at an altitude of 254 metres (833 ft) and covers an area of 7.98 km^{2} (3.08 sq mi) (2025).

== Population ==
Population statistic (10 years)
Year	1995	2005	2015	2025
Count	791	852	954	1117
Difference		+7.71%	+11.97%	+17.08%

Population statistic
Year	2024	2025
Count	1105	1117
Difference		+1.08%

It has a population of 1117 people (31 December 2025).

=== Ethnicity ===
Census 2021 (1+ %)
Ethnicity	Number	Fraction
Slovak	1020	97.51%
Not found out	21	2%
Czech	15	1.43%
Total	1046	

In year 2021 was 1046 people by ethnicity 1020 as Slovak, 21 as Not found out, 15 as Czech, 3 as Italian, 3 as Rusyn, 2 as Serbian, 2 as Polish, 1 as Russian, 1 as German, 1 as Hungarian, 1 as Other and 1 as English.

Note on population: The difference values of population numbers in the table "Population statistic" and in the sections "Ethnicity" & "Religion" is caused by the use of various statistical methods.

=== Religion ===
Census 2021 (1+ %)
Religion	Number	Fraction
Roman Catholic Church	776	74.19%
None	137	13.1%
Evangelical Church	90	8.6%
Not found out	22	2.1%
Total	1046	

In year 2021 was 1046 people by religion 776 from Roman Catholic Church, 137 from None, 90 from Evangelical Church, 22 from Not found out, 8 from Ad hoc movements, 4 from Eastern Orthodox Church, 4 from Other and not ascertained christian church, 4 from Other and 1 from Greek Catholic Church.
