= Kvašov =

- Municipality
- Flag Coat of arms

- Location of Kvašov in the Trenčín Region Location of Kvašov in Slovakia
- Coordinates: 49.07°N 18.22°E
- Country: Slovakia
- Region: Trenčín Region
- District: Púchov District
- First mentioned: 1471

Area
  - Total: 7.46 km^{2} (2.88 sq mi)
- Elevation: 332 m (1,089 ft)

Population (2025)
  - Total: 632
- Time zone: UTC+1 (CET)
  - Summer (DST): UTC+2 (CEST)
- Postal code: 206 2
- Area code: +421 42
- Vehicle registration plate (until 2022): PU
- Website: www.kvasov.eu/en/

Kvašov (Hungarian: Kvassó) is a village and municipality in Púchov District in the Trenčín Region of north-western Slovakia.

== History ==
In historical records the village was first mentioned in 1471.

== Geography ==
The municipality lies at an altitude of 332 metres (1,089 ft) and covers an area of 7.46 km^{2} (2.88 sq mi) (2025).

== Population ==
Population statistic (10 years)
Year	1995	2005	2015	2025
Count	670	673	659	632
Difference		+0.44%	−2.08%	−4.09%

Population statistic
Year	2024	2025
Count	636	632
Difference		−0.62%

It has a population of 632 people (31 December 2025).

=== Ethnicity ===
Census 2021 (1+ %)
Ethnicity	Number	Fraction
Slovak	640	98%
Not found out	9	1.37%
Total	653	

In year 2021 was 653 people by ethnicity 640 as Slovak, 9 as Not found out, 5 as Czech, 4 as Other, 2 as Jewish and 1 as Ukrainian.

Note on population: The difference values of population numbers in the table "Population statistic" and in the sections "Ethnicity" & "Religion" is caused by the use of various statistical methods.

=== Religion ===
Census 2021 (1+ %)
Religion	Number	Fraction
Roman Catholic Church	575	88.06%
None	41	6.28%
Not found out	14	2.14%
Total	653	

In year 2021 was 653 people by religion 575 from Roman Catholic Church, 41 from None, 14 from Not found out, 6 from Evangelical Church, 5 from Other, 5 from Greek Catholic Church, 3 from Islam, 2 from Ad hoc movements, 1 from Jewish community and 1 from Christian Congregations in Slovakia.
