= Lednica, Púchov District =

Lednica
- Municipality
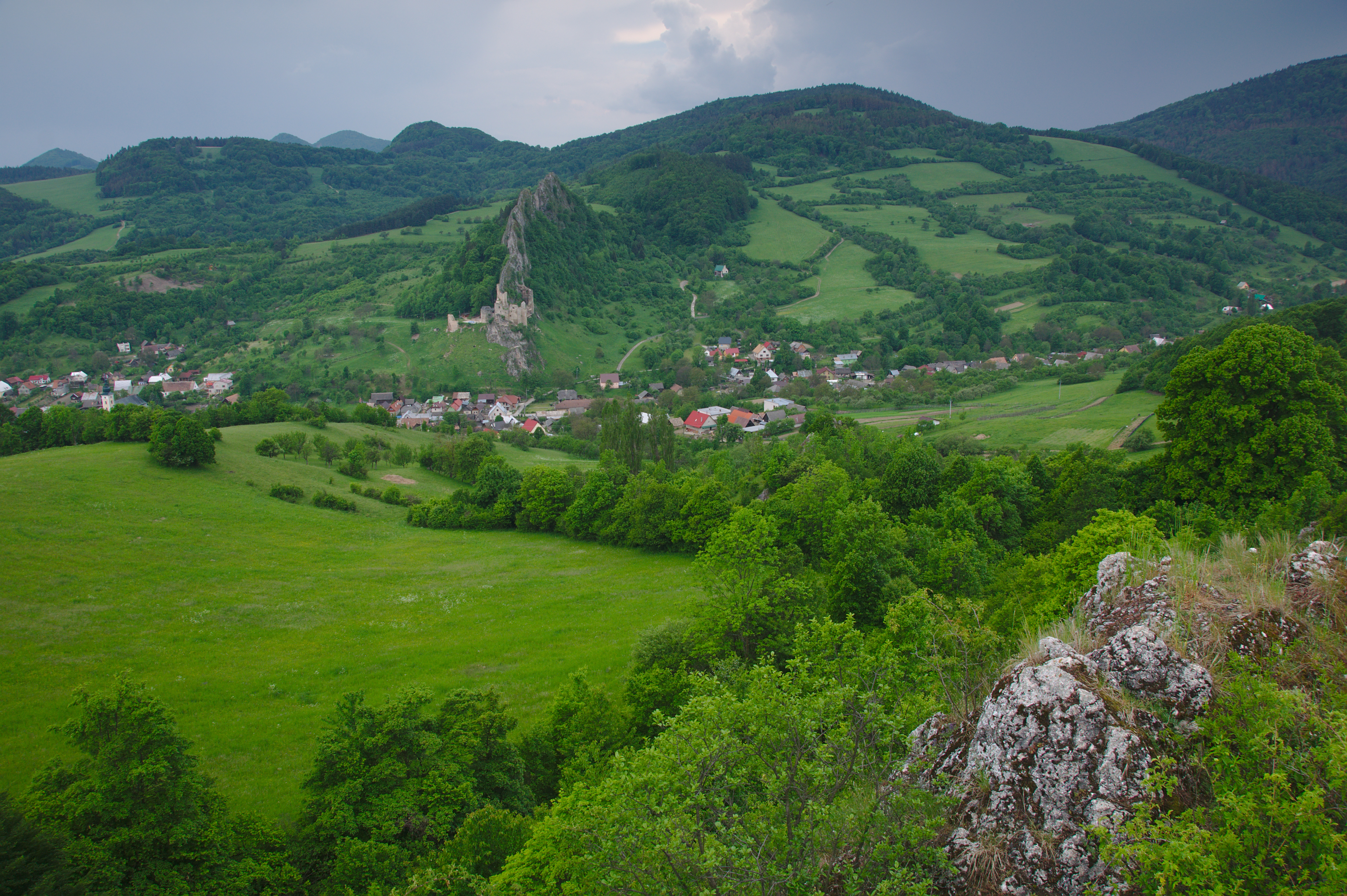

- Flag

- Location of Lednica in the Trenčín Region Location of Lednica in Slovakia
- Coordinates: 49°07′N 18°13′E
- Country: Slovakia
- Region: Trenčín Region
- District: Púchov District
- First mentioned: 1259

Area
  - Total: 22.65 km^{2} (8.75 sq mi)
- Elevation: 404 m (1,325 ft)

Population (2025)
  - Total: 893
- Time zone: UTC+1 (CET)
  - Summer (DST): UTC+2 (CEST)
- Postal code: 206 3
- Area code: +421 42
- Vehicle registration plate (until 2022): PU
- Website: www.lednica.eu.sk

Lednica (Hungarian: Lednic) is a village and municipality in Púchov District in the Trenčín Region of north-western Slovakia.

== History ==
In historical records the village was first mentioned in 1259.

== Geography ==
The municipality lies at an altitude of 404 metres (1,325 ft) and covers an area of 22.65 km^{2} (8.75 sq mi) (2025).

== Population ==
Population statistic (10 years)
Year	1995	2005	2015	2025
Count	1062	1018	963	893
Difference		−4.14%	−5.40%	−7.26%

Population statistic
Year	2024	2025
Count	894	893
Difference		−0.11%

It has a population of 893 people (31 December 2025).

=== Ethnicity ===
Census 2021 (1+ %)
Ethnicity	Number	Fraction
Slovak	929	98.82%
Total	940	

In year 2021 was 940 people by ethnicity 929 as Slovak, 8 as Not found out, 5 as Czech, 5 as Other, 4 as Serbian and 3 as Ukrainian.

Note on population: The difference values of population numbers in the table "Population statistic" and in the sections "Ethnicity" & "Religion" is caused by the use of various statistical methods.

=== Religion ===
Census 2021 (1+ %)
Religion	Number	Fraction
Roman Catholic Church	813	86.49%
None	76	8.09%
Evangelical Church	11	1.17%
Total	940	

In year 2021 was 940 people by religion 813 from Roman Catholic Church, 76 from None, 11 from Evangelical Church, 9 from Not found out, 6 from Eastern Orthodox Church, 5 from Christian Congregations in Slovakia, 5 from Ad hoc movements, 3 from Other, 2 from Calvinist Church, 2 from Other and not ascertained christian church, 2 from Jehovah's Witnesses, 2 from Greek Catholic Church, 2 from Bahá'i Community, 1 from Paganism and natural spirituality and 1 from United Methodist Church.
