= Lazy pod Makytou =

- Municipality
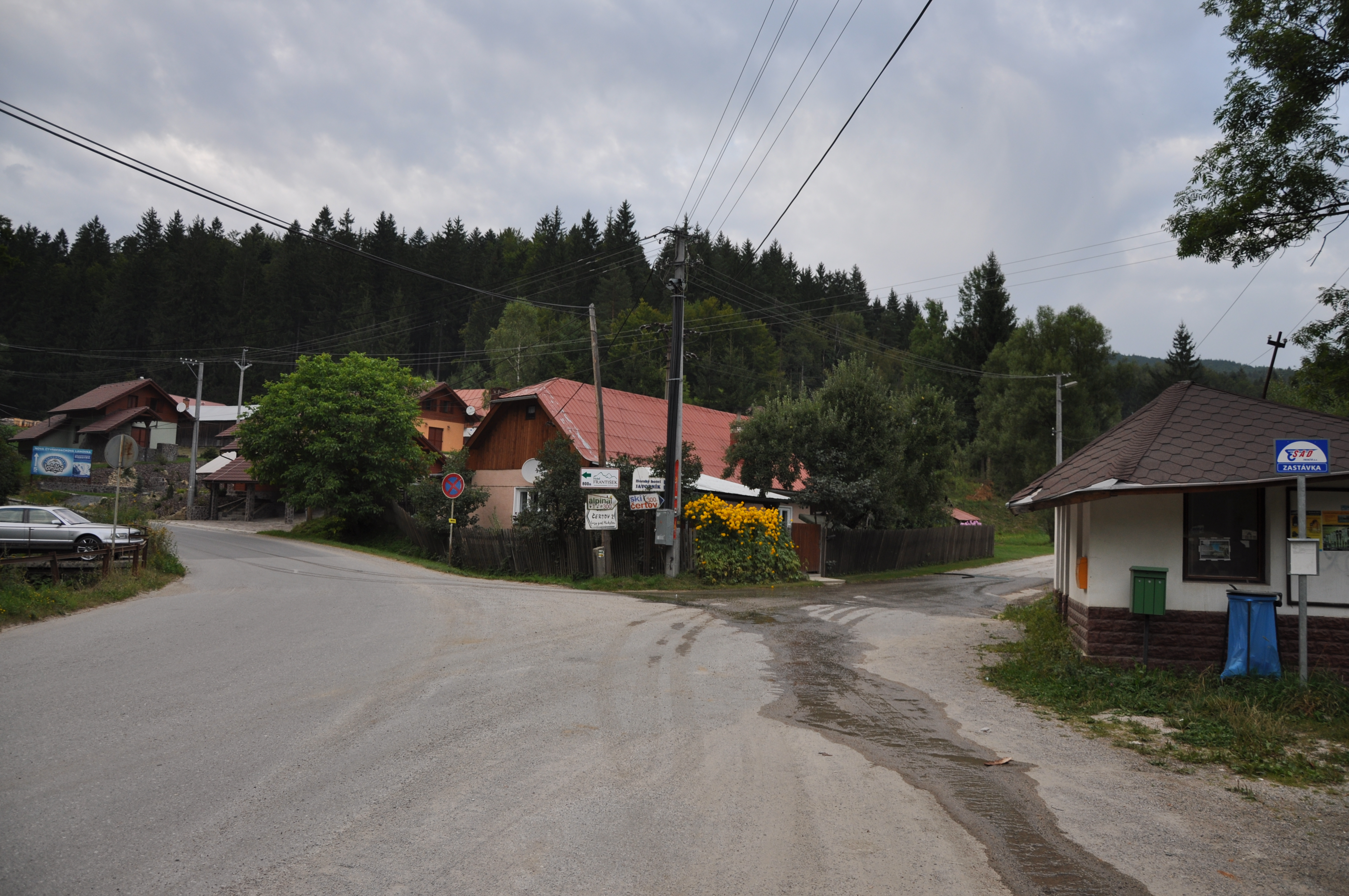

- Flag

- Location of Lazy pod Makytou in the Trenčín Region Location of Lazy pod Makytou in Slovakia
- Coordinates: 49.23°N 18.23°E
- Country: Slovakia
- Region: Trenčín Region
- District: Púchov District
- First mentioned: 1475

Area
  - Total: 49.86 km^{2} (19.25 sq mi)
- Elevation: 380 m (1,250 ft)

Population (2025)
  - Total: 1,211
- Time zone: UTC+1 (CET)
  - Summer (DST): UTC+2 (CEST)
- Postal code: 205 5
- Area code: +421 42
- Vehicle registration plate (until 2022): PU
- Website: www.lazypodmakytou.sk

Lazy pod Makytou (German: Laaz, Hungarian: Láz) is a village and municipality in the Púchov District of the Trenčín Region of northwestern Slovakia.

== History ==
In historical records the village was first mentioned in 1475.

== Geography ==
The municipality lies at an altitude of 380 metres (1,250 ft) and covers an area of 49.86 km^{2} (19.25 sq mi) (2025).

== Population ==
Population statistic (10 years)
Year	1995	2005	2015	2025
Count	1451	1382	1244	1211
Difference		−4.75%	−9.98%	−2.65%

Population statistic
Year	2024	2025
Count	1224	1211
Difference		−1.06%

It has a population of 1211 people (31 December 2025).

=== Ethnicity ===
Census 2021 (1+ %)
Ethnicity	Number	Fraction
Slovak	1148	94.95%
Not found out	53	4.38%
Czech	25	2.06%
Total	1209	

In year 2021 was 1209 people by ethnicity 1148 as Slovak, 53 as Not found out, 25 as Czech, 8 as Russian, 4 as Rusyn, 2 as Other, 1 as Italian, 1 as German and 1 as Canadian.

Note on population: The difference values of population numbers in the table "Population statistic" and in the sections "Ethnicity" & "Religion" is caused by the use of various statistical methods.

=== Religion ===
Census 2021 (1+ %)
Religion	Number	Fraction
Evangelical Church	558	46.15%
Roman Catholic Church	468	38.71%
None	105	8.68%
Not found out	52	4.3%
Total	1209	

In year 2021 was 1209 people by religion 558 from Evangelical Church, 468 from Roman Catholic Church, 105 from None, 52 from Not found out, 10 from Greek Catholic Church, 5 from Christian Congregations in Slovakia, 3 from Eastern Orthodox Church, 2 from Paganism and natural spirituality, 2 from Other, 2 from Ad hoc movements, 1 from Other and not ascertained christian church and 1 from United Methodist Church.
