= Záriečie =

Village in Slovakia

- Municipality
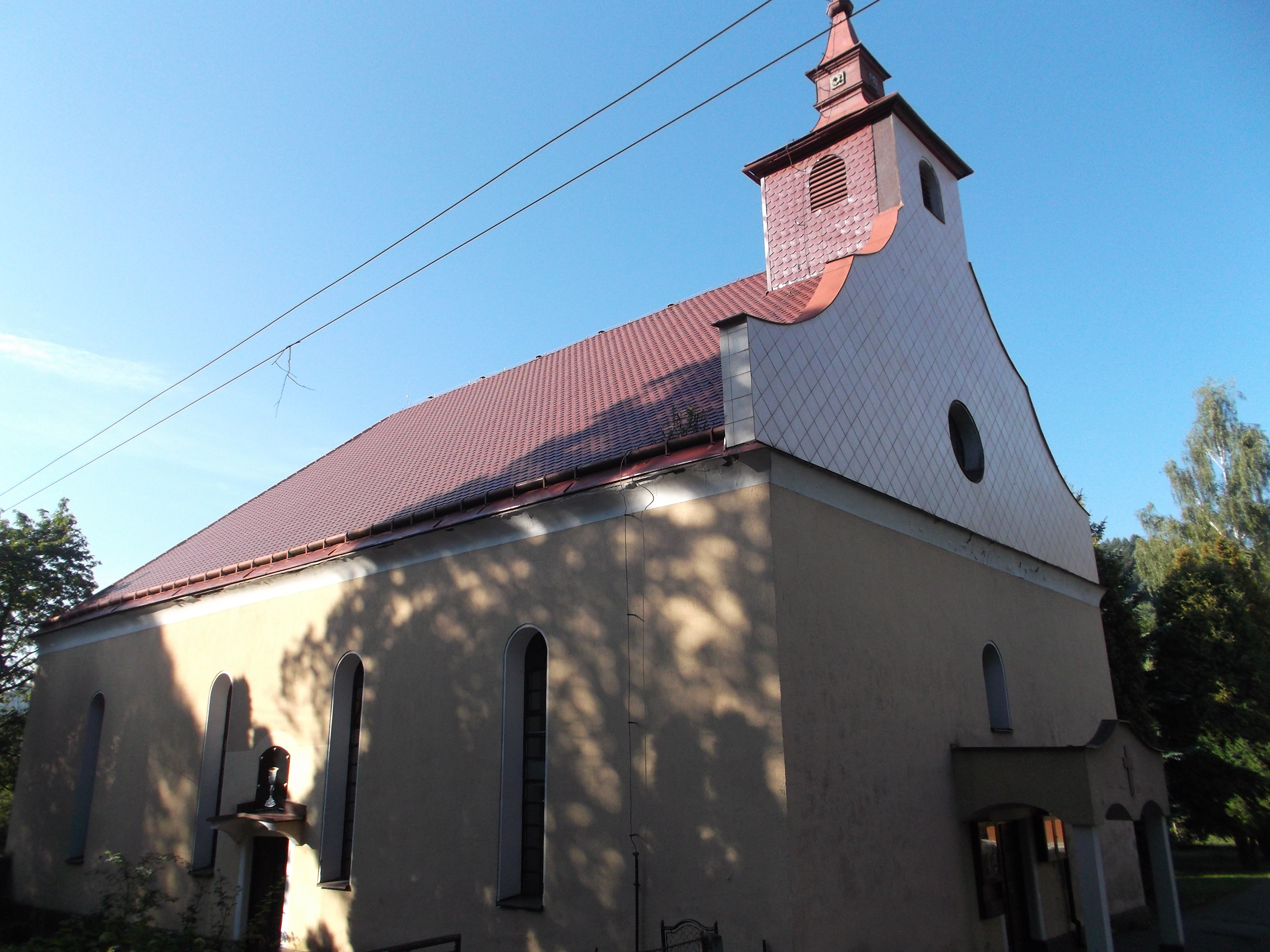
- Lutheran church in Záriečie

- Flag

- Location of Záriečie in the Trenčín Region Location of Záriečie in Slovakia
- Coordinates: 49.18°N 18.25°E
- Country: Slovakia
- Region: Trenčín Region
- District: Púchov District
- First mentioned: 1475

Area
  - Total: 9.41 km^{2} (3.63 sq mi)
- Elevation: 333 m (1,093 ft)

Population (2025)
  - Total: 683
- Time zone: UTC+1 (CET)
  - Summer (DST): UTC+2 (CEST)
- Postal code: 205 2
- Area code: +421 42
- Vehicle registration plate (until 2022): PU
- Website: zariecie.sk

Záriečie (Hungarian: Felsőzáros) is a village and municipality in Púchov District in the Trenčín Region of north-western Slovakia.

== History ==
In historical records, the village was first mentioned in 1475.

== Geography ==
The municipality lies at an altitude of 333 metres (1,093 ft) and covers an area of 9.41 km^{2} (3.63 sq mi) (2025).

== Population ==
Population statistic (10 years)
Year	1995	2005	2015	2025
Count	671	685	707	683
Difference		+2.08%	+3.21%	−3.39%

Population statistic
Year	2024	2025
Count	696	683
Difference		−1.86%

It has a population of 683 people (31 December 2025).

=== Ethnicity ===
Census 2021 (1+ %)
Ethnicity	Number	Fraction
Slovak	687	97.72%
Not found out	14	1.99%
Czech	10	1.42%
Total	703	

In year 2021 was 703 people by ethnicity 687 as Slovak, 14 as Not found out, 10 as Czech, 3 as Other, 1 as Russian and 1 as Polish.

Note on population: The difference values of population numbers in the table "Population statistic" and in the sections "Ethnicity" & "Religion" is caused by the use of various statistical methods.

=== Religion ===
Census 2021 (1+ %)
Religion	Number	Fraction
Evangelical Church	419	59.6%
Roman Catholic Church	185	26.32%
None	66	9.39%
Not found out	21	2.99%
Total	703	

In year 2021 was 703 people by religion 419 from Evangelical Church, 185 from Roman Catholic Church, 66 from None, 21 from Not found out, 3 from Ad hoc movements, 2 from United Methodist Church, 1 from Other and not ascertained christian church, 1 from Islam, 1 from Other, 1 from Hinduism, 1 from Greek Catholic Church, 1 from Buddhism and 1 from Apostolic Church.
