= Lúky =

- Municipality
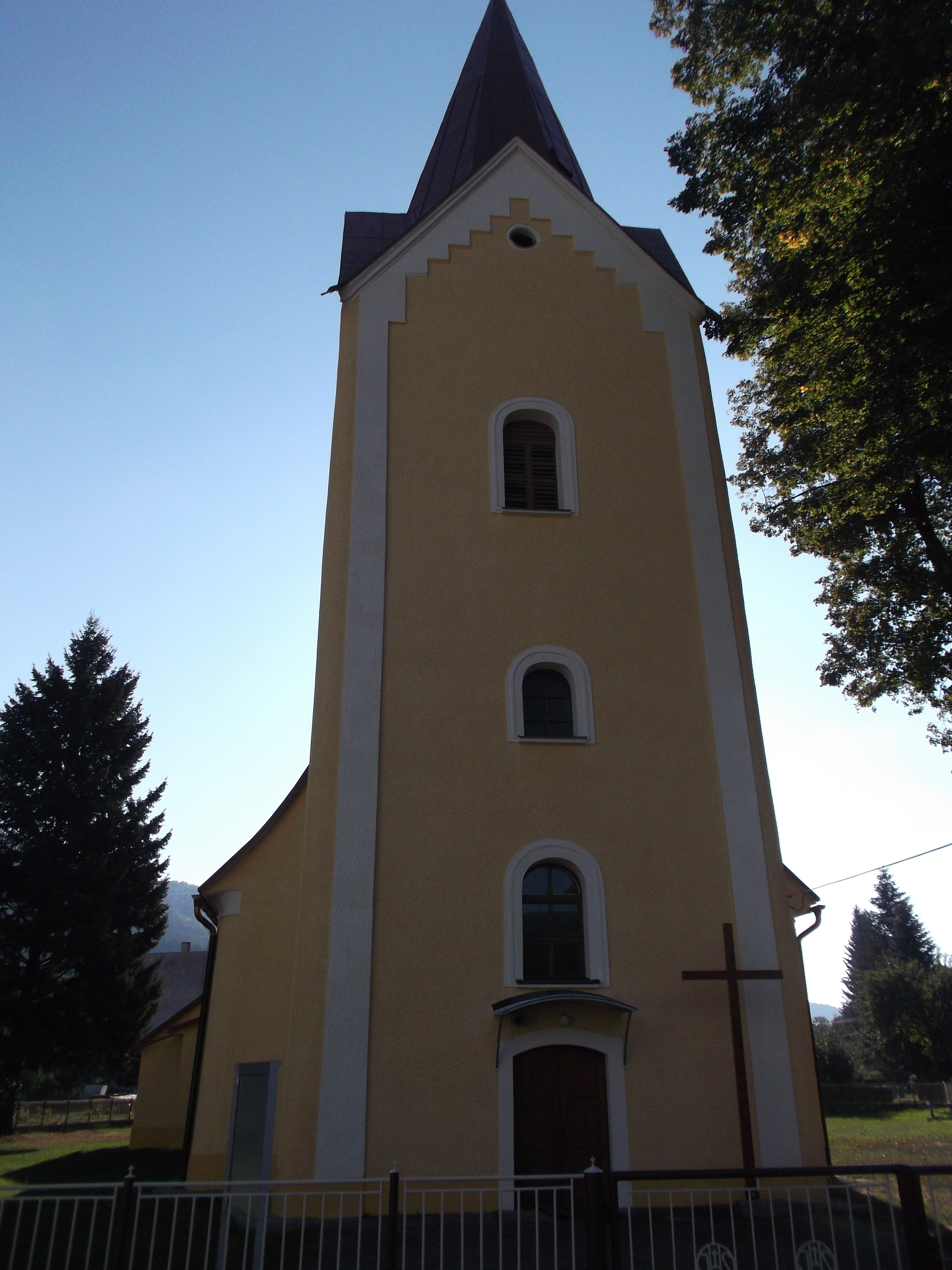

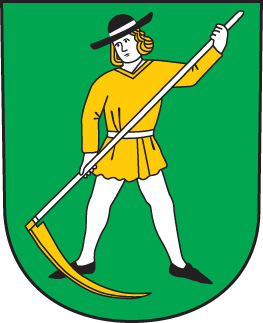
- Flag Coat of arms

- Location of Lúky in the Trenčín Region Location of Lúky in Slovakia
- Coordinates: 49.19°N 18.22°E
- Country: Slovakia
- Region: Trenčín Region
- District: Púchov District
- First mentioned: 1471

Area
  - Total: 7.73 km^{2} (2.98 sq mi)
- Elevation: 332 m (1,089 ft)

Population (2025)
  - Total: 887
- Time zone: UTC+1 (CET)
  - Summer (DST): UTC+2 (CEST)
- Postal code: 205 3
- Area code: +421 42
- Vehicle registration plate (until 2022): PU
- Website: www.obecluky.sk

Lúky (Hungarian: Alsórétfalu) is a village and municipality in Púchov District in the Trenčín Region of north-western Slovakia.

== History ==
In historical records the village was first mentioned in 1471.

== Geography ==
The municipality lies at an altitude of 332 metres (1,089 ft) and covers an area of 7.73 km^{2} (2.98 sq mi) (2025).

== Population ==
Population statistic (10 years)
Year	1995	2005	2015	2025
Count	954	959	929	887
Difference		+0.52%	−3.12%	−4.52%

Population statistic
Year	2024	2025
Count	901	887
Difference		−1.55%

It has a population of 887 people (31 December 2025).

=== Ethnicity ===
Census 2021 (1+ %)
Ethnicity	Number	Fraction
Slovak	899	97.29%
Not found out	21	2.27%
Total	924	

In year 2021 was 924 people by ethnicity 899 as Slovak, 21 as Not found out, 9 as Czech, 2 as Russian, 1 as Irish, 1 as Rusyn, 1 as German and 1 as Other.

Note on population: The difference values of population numbers in the table "Population statistic" and in the sections "Ethnicity" & "Religion" is caused by the use of various statistical methods.

=== Religion ===
Census 2021 (1+ %)
Religion	Number	Fraction
Roman Catholic Church	578	62.55%
Evangelical Church	206	22.29%
None	93	10.06%
Not found out	29	3.14%
Total	924	

In year 2021 was 924 people by religion 578 from Roman Catholic Church, 206 from Evangelical Church, 93 from None, 29 from Not found out, 4 from Eastern Orthodox Church, 4 from Christian Congregations in Slovakia, 4 from Greek Catholic Church, 2 from Ad hoc movements, 1 from Jehovah's Witnesses, 1 from Other, 1 from United Methodist Church and 1 from Buddhism.
