= Nimnica =

- Municipality
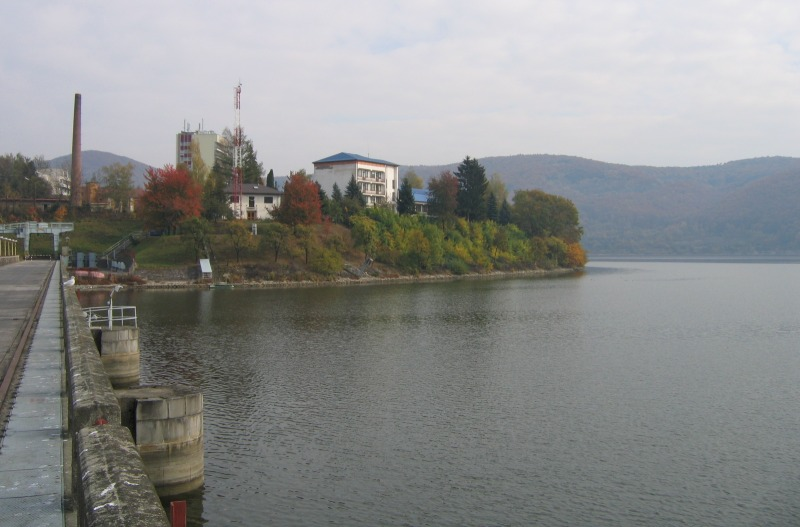

- Flag

- Location of Nimnica in the Trenčín Region Location of Nimnica in Slovakia
- Coordinates: 49.13°N 18.35°E
- Country: Slovakia
- Region: Trenčín Region
- District: Púchov District
- First mentioned: 1408

Area
  - Total: 7.35 km^{2} (2.84 sq mi)
- Elevation: 266 m (873 ft)

Population (2025)
  - Total: 718
- Time zone: UTC+1 (CET)
  - Summer (DST): UTC+2 (CEST)
- Postal code: 207 1
- Area code: +421 42
- Vehicle registration plate (until 2022): PU
- Website: www.nimnica.eu

Nimnica (Hungarian: Nemőc) is a spa village and municipality in Púchov District in the Trenčín Region of north-western Slovakia. It is located between the towns of Púchov and Považská Bystrica.

== History ==
In historical records the village was first mentioned in 1408.

== Geography ==
The municipality lies at an altitude of 266 metres (873 ft) and covers an area of 7.35 km^{2} (2.84 sq mi) (2025).

== Population ==
Population statistic (10 years)
Year	1995	2005	2015	2025
Count	646	672	705	718
Difference		+4.02%	+4.91%	+1.84%

Population statistic
Year	2024	2025
Count	732	718
Difference		−1.91%

It has a population of 718 people (31 December 2025).

=== Ethnicity ===
Census 2021 (1+ %)
Ethnicity	Number	Fraction
Slovak	698	97.48%
Not found out	16	2.23%
Total	716	

In year 2021 was 716 people by ethnicity 698 as Slovak, 16 as Not found out, 7 as Czech, 3 as Italian, 3 as Other, 2 as Romani, 1 as Irish, 1 as Rusyn and 1 as German.

Note on population: The difference values of population numbers in the table "Population statistic" and in the sections "Ethnicity" & "Religion" is caused by the use of various statistical methods.

=== Religion ===
Census 2021 (1+ %)
Religion	Number	Fraction
Roman Catholic Church	433	60.47%
None	130	18.16%
Evangelical Church	126	17.6%
Not found out	13	1.82%
Total	716	

In year 2021 was 716 people by religion 433 from Roman Catholic Church, 130 from None, 126 from Evangelical Church, 13 from Not found out, 3 from Christian Congregations in Slovakia, 3 from Greek Catholic Church, 2 from Old Catholic Church, 1 from Islam, 1 from Other, 1 from Hinduism, 1 from United Methodist Church, 1 from Buddhism and 1 from Ad hoc movements.

== Culture ==
It is mostly known for its spa, which opened in 1959, following a discovery of a strong spring during the construction of a local dam.
