= Dolná Breznica =

- Municipality
- Flag

- Location of Dolná Breznica in the Trenčín Region Location of Dolná Breznica in Slovakia
- Coordinates: 49.08°N 18.27°E
- Country: Slovakia
- Region: Trenčín Region
- District: Púchov District
- First mentioned: 1388

Area
  - Total: 8.36 km^{2} (3.23 sq mi)
- Elevation: 296 m (971 ft)

Population (2025)
  - Total: 1,083
- Time zone: UTC+1 (CET)
  - Summer (DST): UTC+2 (CEST)
- Postal code: 206 1
- Area code: +421 42
- Vehicle registration plate (until 2022): PU
- Website: www.dolnabreznica.eu

Dolná Breznica (Hungarian: Alsónyíresd) is a village and municipality in Púchov District in the Trenčín Region of north-western Slovakia.

== History ==
In historical records the village was first mentioned in 1388.

== Geography ==
The municipality lies at an altitude of 296 metres (971 ft) and covers an area of 8.36 km^{2} (3.23 sq mi) (2025).

== Population ==
Population statistic (10 years)
Year	1995	2005	2015	2025
Count	787	802	934	1083
Difference		+1.90%	+16.45%	+15.95%

Population statistic
Year	2024	2025
Count	1073	1083
Difference		+0.93%

It has a population of 1083 people (31 December 2025).

=== Ethnicity ===
Census 2021 (1+ %)
Ethnicity	Number	Fraction
Slovak	998	99.4%
Total	1004	

In year 2021 was 1004 people by ethnicity 998 as Slovak, 8 as Not found out, 3 as Czech, 3 as Polish, 2 as Other and 1 as German.

Note on population: The difference values of population numbers in the table "Population statistic" and in the sections "Ethnicity" & "Religion" is caused by the use of various statistical methods.

=== Religion ===
Census 2021 (1+ %)
Religion	Number	Fraction
Roman Catholic Church	879	87.55%
None	79	7.87%
Evangelical Church	18	1.79%
Not found out	16	1.59%
Total	1004	

In year 2021 was 1004 people by religion 879 from Roman Catholic Church, 79 from None, 18 from Evangelical Church, 16 from Not found out, 4 from Christian Congregations in Slovakia, 3 from Calvinist Church, 2 from Other, 1 from Other and not ascertained christian church, 1 from Greek Catholic Church and 1 from Ad hoc movements.

== Genealogical resources ==
The records for genealogical research are available at the state archive "Statny Archiv in Bytca, Slovakia"

- Roman Catholic church records (births/marriages/deaths): 1788-1895 (parish B)

== See also ==
- List of municipalities and towns in Slovakia
