= Visolaje =

- Municipality
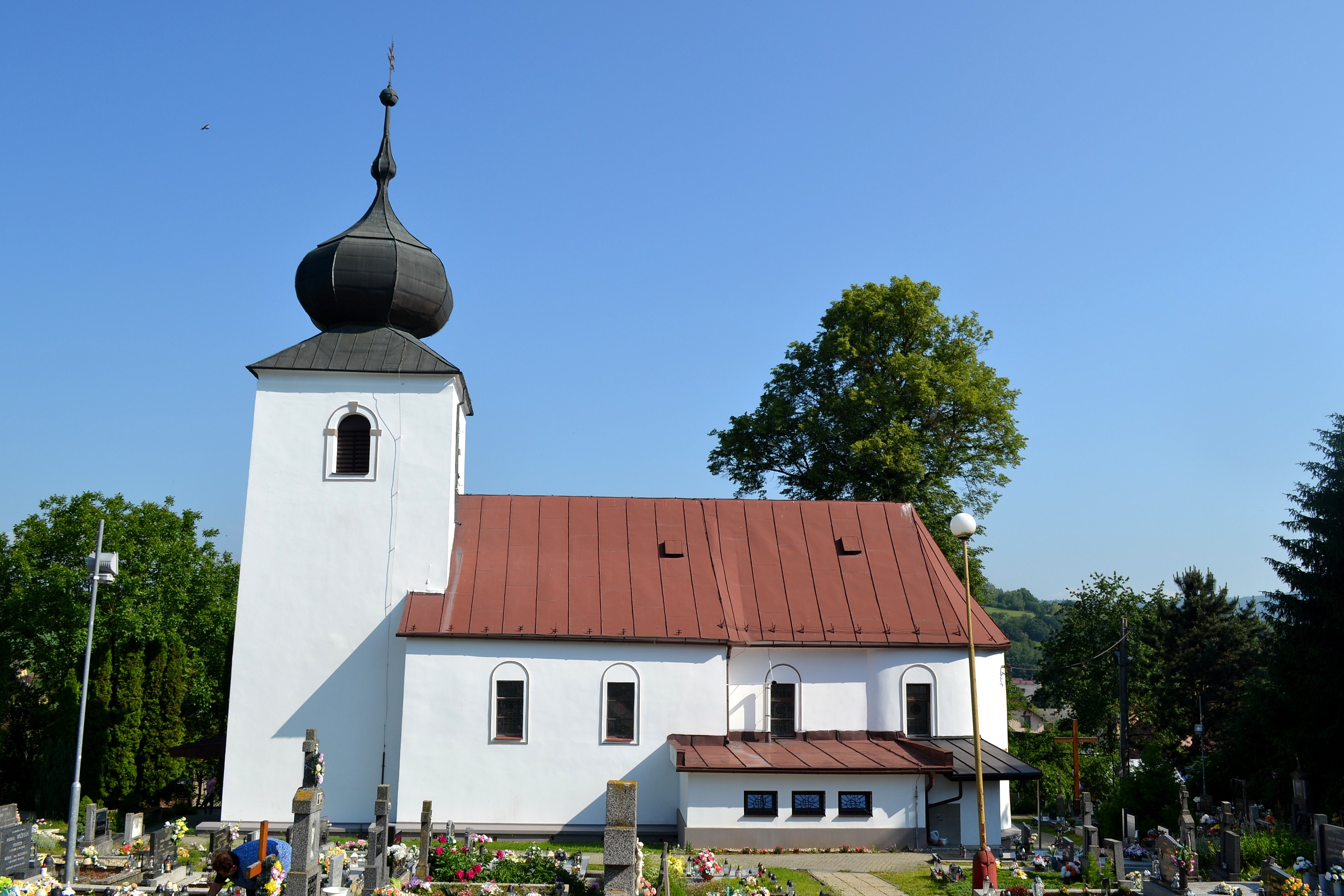
- Church of Saint Gall

- Flag Coat of arms

- Location of Visolaje in the Trenčín Region Location of Visolaje in Slovakia
- Coordinates: 49.07°N 18.37°E
- Country: Slovakia
- Region: Trenčín Region
- District: Púchov District
- First mentioned: 1327

Area
  - Total: 9.67 km^{2} (3.73 sq mi)
- Elevation: 267 m (876 ft)

Population (2025)
  - Total: 951
- Time zone: UTC+1 (CET)
  - Summer (DST): UTC+2 (CEST)
- Postal code: 186 1
- Area code: +421 42
- Vehicle registration plate (until 2022): PU
- Website: www.visolaje.sk

Visolaje (Hungarian: Viszolaj) is a village and municipality in the Púchov District, Trenčín Region of Slovakia. As of 2004, it had 947 inhabitants. The village lies near the major D1 motorway from Bratislava to Žilina

The Church of St. Gallus in the village dates from the 14th century. The first scriptural note is from year 1327.

== Geography ==
The municipality lies at an altitude of 267 metres (876 ft) and covers an area of 9.67 km^{2} (3.73 sq mi) (2025).

== Population ==
Population statistic (10 years)
Year	1995	2005	2015	2025
Count	905	951	914	951
Difference		+5.08%	−3.89%	+4.04%

Population statistic
Year	2024	2025
Count	960	951
Difference		−0.93%

It has a population of 951 people (31 December 2025).

=== Ethnicity ===
Census 2021 (1+ %)
Ethnicity	Number	Fraction
Slovak	934	96.18%
Not found out	38	3.91%
Total	971	

In year 2021 was 971 people by ethnicity 934 as Slovak, 38 as Not found out, 1 as Russian and 1 as Other.

Note on population: The difference values of population numbers in the table "Population statistic" and in the sections "Ethnicity" & "Religion" is caused by the use of various statistical methods.

=== Religion ===
Census 2021 (1+ %)
Religion	Number	Fraction
Roman Catholic Church	857	88.26%
None	52	5.36%
Not found out	39	4.02%
Evangelical Church	11	1.13%
Total	971	

In year 2021 was 971 people by religion 857 from Roman Catholic Church, 52 from None, 39 from Not found out, 11 from Evangelical Church, 4 from Greek Catholic Church, 4 from United Methodist Church, 2 from Calvinist Church and 2 from Ad hoc movements.
