= Rona glassworks =

Slovak glass manufacturer

RONA
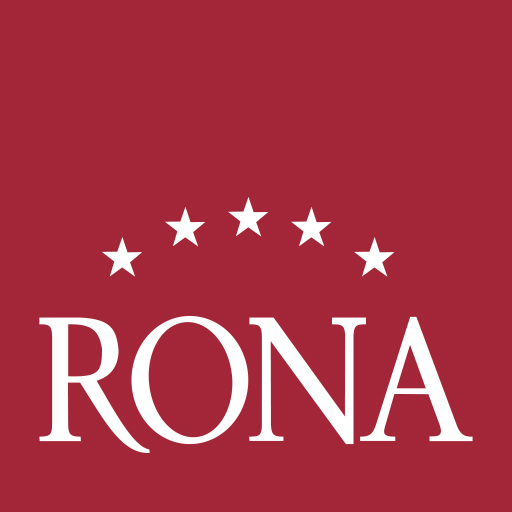
- Type: Private
- Industry: Glass manufacturer, production of drinking glasses of lead-free crystal, clear and decorated
- Founded: 1892
- Founder: Jozef Schreiber
- Headquarters: Lednické Rovne, Slovakia
- Area served: Worldwide
- Products: Household goods, drinking glass for households and professional use in gastronomy, aerospace and ship catering
- Revenue: €62 million (2015)
- Website: www.rona.sk

RONA a.s. (distribution under RONA brand) is a Slovak drinking glass manufacturer, established in Lednické Rovne, Slovakia, in 1892. The name RONA comes from the former naming of the village ‘‘Lednicz Rone’’. The company manufactures unleaded drinking glasses, known as crystal glass. 96% of production is exported and is available in more than 80 countries worldwide. The yearly production of the company exceeds 60 million pieces (2016). Product segments include households, the gastronomy business, aerospace, and ship catering.

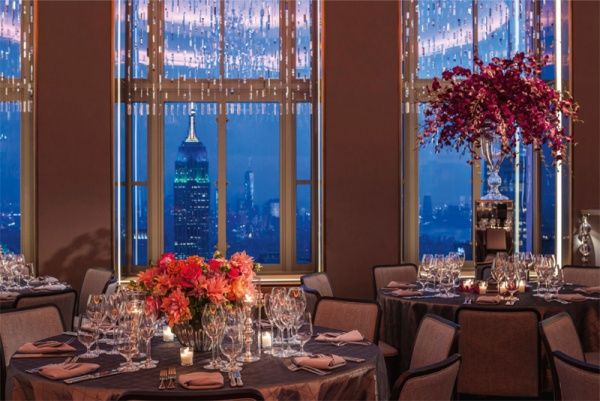
RONA Glass in the Rainbow Room, Rockefeller Center, NYC, 2015.

Products of the company can be found at Buckingham Palace and the White House. RONA created also a gift set for the football club Manchester United designed for fan shops in 2006. At the turn of 2008 and 2009, the company created and manufactured sets for fans of FC Barcelona, composed of stemware for champagne, red and white wines and carafes. The glass from Lednické Rovne can be found in the New York Rockefeller center's Rainbow Room, and in luxury hotels in Dubai and Las Vegas. The glass from the RONA company is supplied to airlines including: Emirates, Qatar Airways, Etihad, KLM, and American Airlines. Relief stemware set named Harmony was presented in an American sitcom from the world of young physicists, The Big Bang Theory.

The main manufacturing programs of the glassworks:

- An automatic manufacturing of the stemware with attached stem, stemware with pulled stem, large accessory pieces such as vases, bowls, carafes and other accessories
- Handmade stemware, tumblers, vases, bowls, carafes and accessories
- Glass (hand made and machine made) refinements by various glass decoration techniques (pantograph etching, cutting, painting, engraving, spraying, screen printing, tampoprint, an automatic calibration by laser).

== History ==
=== Founding ===
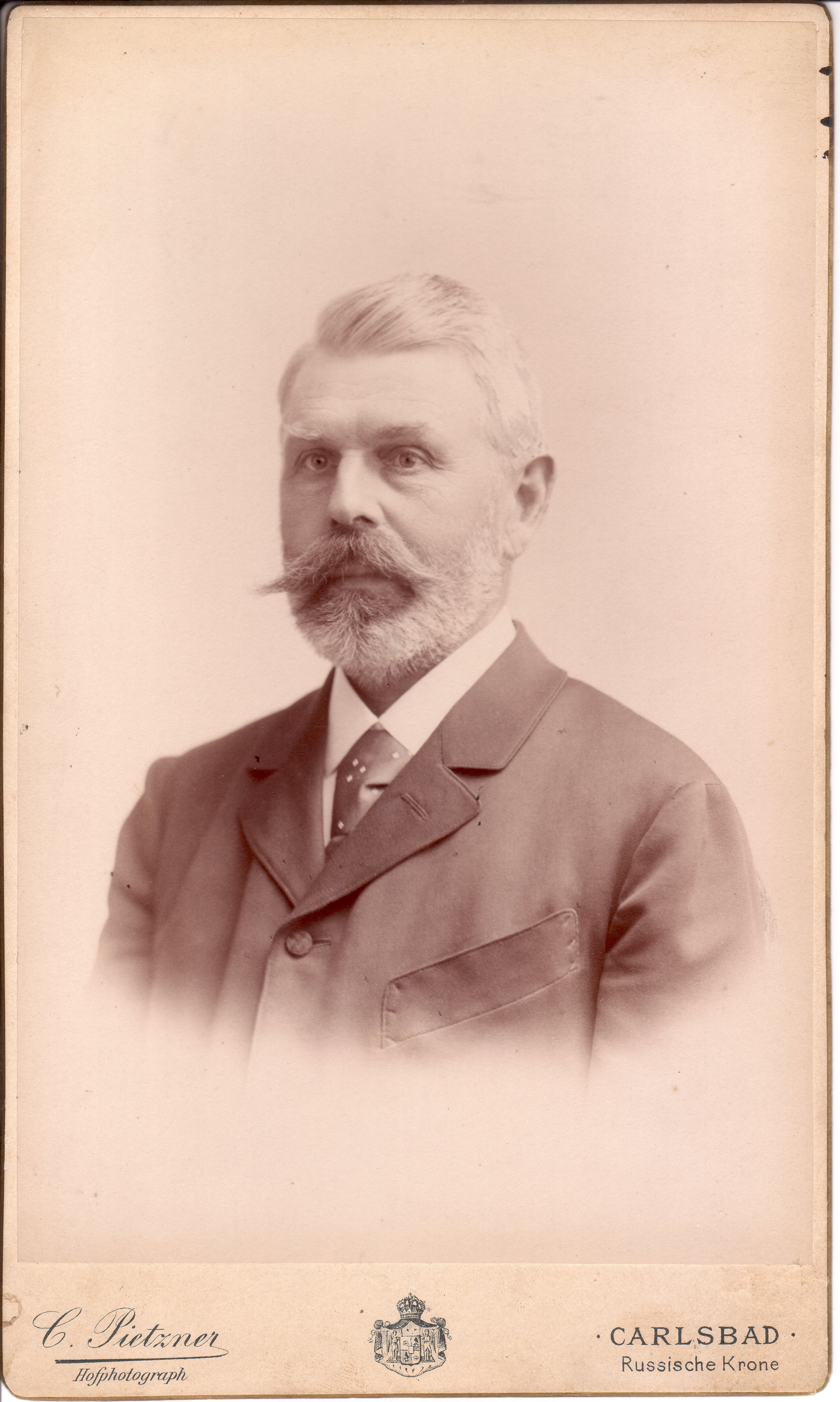
Jozef Schreiber: Founder of glassworks

An entrepreneur Jozef Schreiber founded the company in 1892 as the last and the biggest glassworks of Vienna’s company Schreiber und Neffen, who had the most modern equipment of the time. The company in Lednické Rovne is the most successful Slovak glassworks and the only one left (2017).

It started by the manufacturing of flat glass, later pressed glass under Kaiserkristall brand that the company established as the first in Austria-Hungary. This was popular at the turn of the century for price and the fact that it imitated products of luxury cut lead glass. The goods were sold under the name ’’Imperial Crystal’’. Besides the pressed glass was manufactured hand blown glass under RONA Crystal brand focused on drinking glass and sets for hotels, medical institutions, cafes… as well as domestic glass for a household.

Besides clear glass, the glassworks is known for its decoration techniques such as cutting, engraving, guilloche, painting, spraying, screen printing, tampoprint (an automatic calibration by laser), and pantograph technology. The company in Lednické Rovne established pantographs of English production as the first in Europe in 1896. In the 1940s, the company cooperated in the development of decors with professional designers Vincent Hložník and Martin Benka.

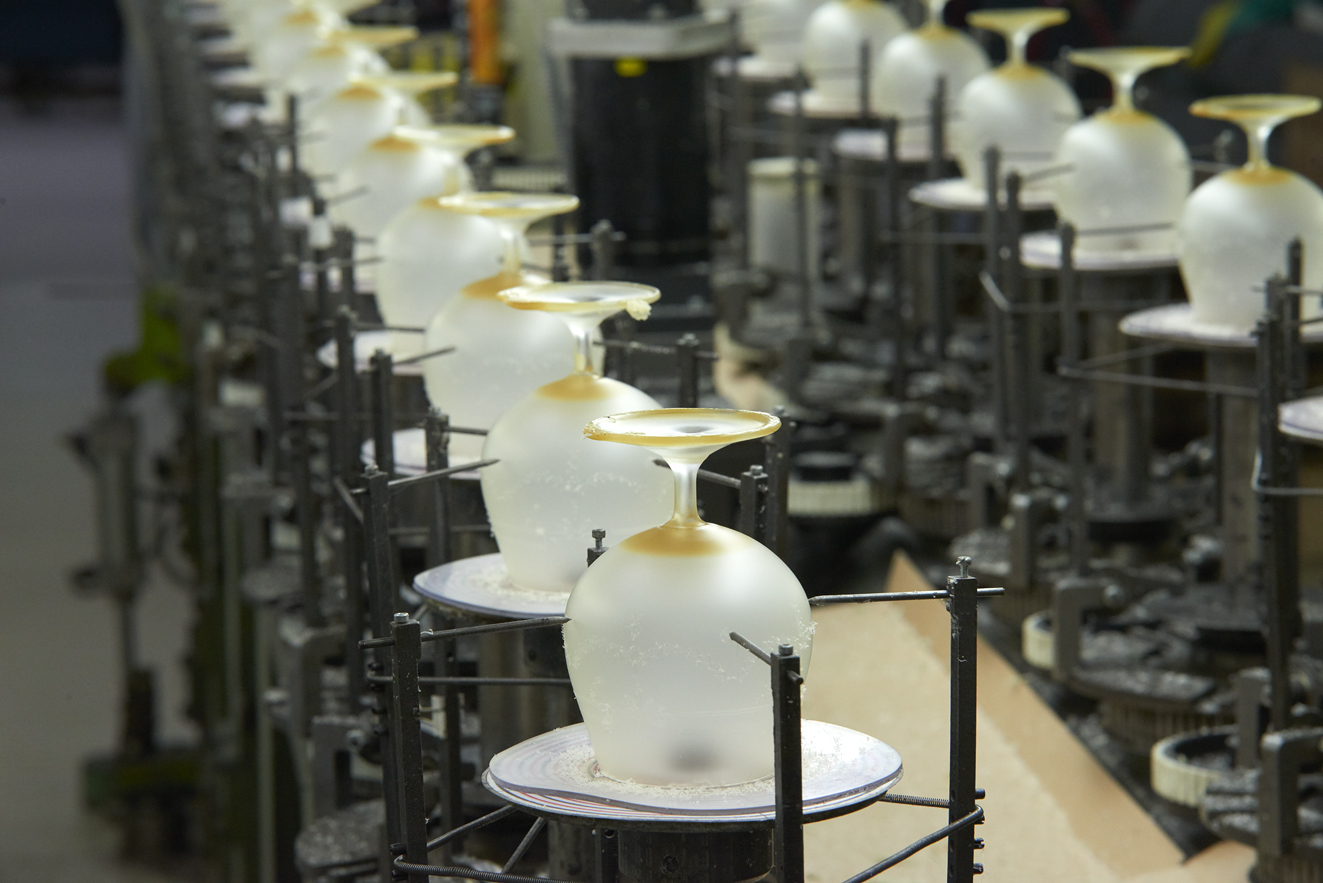
RONA pantograph

Archived collections show products from the beginning that were decorated, full-colour pieces, along with functional designs of clear, plain glass. These lines were developed by patenting of a new handmade technology. Pulled stem, even more in 1956 than currently, is an indicator of glass products from Lednické Rovne.

The history and production of the company was documented by many specialists in their publications; historians and publicists such as Jan Bárta, Ján Mondok, Eduard Toran, Igor Didov, Karol Hetteš, Jindra Bakošová, Agáta Žáčková, Jarmila Račeková and others. Likewise articles in special magazines such as Glasrevue, Sklář a keramik, Sklárske rozhledy, Umení a remesla, Arte Regalo (Spanish magazine), Tableware International, Offrir International, and Casastile (Italian magazine).

=== Chronology of development and organizational changes ===
The company over time has transitioned into and out of socialism, emerging in 1990 to become an exporter in 1992.

1892	Establishment of glassworks Schreiber and nephews (Schreiber und Neffen) by its owner and founder Joseph Schreiber. The glassworks starts with the production of flat glass and tableware pressed glass, but mainly focused on the production of drinking glasses and sets for wholesale customers (hotels, medical centers, cafeterias) under the brand name Rona Crystal. Glassworks is supplying their products to a number of major hotels, including the world-famous Hotel Sacher in Vienna.
1897	Sklené huty (Glassworks), joint stock company Vienna (Glashűttenwerke, Vormals J.Schreiber und Neffen, Aktiengesellschaft Wien)
start of the World War 2	Stőlzle Glasindustrie Aktiengesselschaft in Wien (belonging to concern Creditanstallt – Bank verein in Wien)
18 February 1942	Slovenské sklené huty (Slovak Glassworks), formerly Jozef Schreiber and Neffen, joint stock company with the registered office in Lednické Rovne – separation related to the establishment of the Slovak State
from 25 October 1945 (till nationalisation)	Slovenské sklené huty (Slovak Glassworks), under the national administration
1946 (after nationalisation)	Slovenské sklárne, n.p. (Joint Glassworks, national enterprise) Lednické Rovne with the registered office in Bratislava
1950	Slovenské sklárne, n.p. (Joint Glassworks, national enterprise) Lednické Rovne
from 1 January 1962	Spojené sklárne in Lednické Rovne made part of VHJ "Association of companies producing utility glass" in Nový Bor
from 1 January 1972	Establishment of VHJ Tatrasklo with general directorate in Trnava incorporating five Slovak glassmaking companies
1990	Company as the first leaving GR Tatrasko – transformation period start
1 April 1990	Spojené sklárne, state enterprise Lednické Rovne
1 May 1992	Name change to joint stock company – LR Crystal, a.s. – its objective was to penetrate to foreign markets under the brand LR Crystal and later RONA Crystal, a.s. a Slovak exporter
2 January 1996 – 25 Apríl 2000	B.D.S., a.s. – commercial company exported 95% of its production produced by the production company LR Crystal, a.s. to abroad
1996	Established a foreign trade branch in Liberec, Czech Republic.
26 April 2000 – 30 December 2001	RONA Trading, a.s. – created by the transition from the commercial company B.D.S., a.s.
17 December 2001 – 31 December 2002	RONA Crystal, a.s. – production company established by merger of LR Crystal, a.s. and RONA Trading, a.s.
9 January 2002	RONA, a.s. – commercial company
1 January 2003	RONA, a.s. – current business name of the company with the registered office in Lednické Rovne – established by the merger of RONA Crystal, a.s. and RONA, a.s.. It represents the group of organisations ensuring complex activities linked with the development, production and sales of utility glass and other activities.

=== Calendar of innovations ===
The development of glass production in Lednické Rovne went through many organizational changes, the company overcame many crisis periods of that time and the great program and focused production such as pressed glass, cylinders for lamps, technique and laboratory glass, light bulbs, feeding bottles... changed quite often and it gained the recognition as a producer mostly quality drinking glass at the beginning of 20th century. This program is a representative article of the company to the present when the proportion of hand made and machine production was changed as well as decoration glass. From the half of 60’s of the 20th century, the company focused mainly on a gradual introduction of machinery and automatic production of glass.

1892	Starting with the production of flat glass as well as the production focused on tableware pressed glass, but mainly focused on the production of drinking glass and sets for wholesale customers (hotels, medical centres, cafes).
1896	The pantograph purchased in England (the first English pantograph on the European continent) at that time was applied to obtain decorated items. Thin wall stemware with fine pantograph decoration becomes one of the hallmarks of glass from Lednické Rovne. The goblets were decorated by stylized vegetation motifs and later by geometric patterns of the Art Nouveau period.
1902	Introduction of guilloche decorating technique.
1918	Glassworks in Uhrovec was closed and the production was relocated regarding glass screens for lamps (cylinders for kerosene lamps), which have become significant production and export items.
1956	The technology of pulled stem was applied in the handmade production as the first in the world (designers Hološko-Taraba).
until 1968	Production of lamp bulbs, feeding bottles, and technical glass.
1968	The year of the start of transition from manual to automatic production.
1981	The first automatic line was put into operation for the production of mechanically formed goblets by blow-blow technology.
1998	The glass composition is changed to lead-free crystal glass.
1998	The automatic line was put into operation for the production of vases and decanters by blow-blow technology.
2001	The plant created the world's unique know-how by starting automatic line with so called pulled stem technology. This technology in combination with blow-blow process was for the first time in the world applied in the glassworks RONA. This success contributed significantly to the current achievements and reputation of the glassworks.
2004	International patent for barium free crystal glass. Co-organization of the conference Norbert Kreidl Memorial Conference 23–26 June 2004 Trenčín, Slovakia.
2007	Platinum technology in the blow-blow forming process was applied in order to prevent so called glass line corrosion.
2008	The automatic line was put into operation for the production of mechanically shaped tumblers.
2008	The unique Hot Laser Technology (HLT) was introduced for the treatment of the product rims. It gives extra strength at the rims, significant in HORECA business, aerospace, and ship catering markets.
2016	Patenting automatic laser calibration.
2016	The first automatic product quality inspection technology was applied in the plant.

=== Research and development ===
Within scientific research activities, the company closely works with domestic and foreign institutions which do activities focused on the glass area.

- Institute of Inorganic Chemistry, Slovak Academy of Sciences, Bratislava, Slovakia "IICSAS Slovakia".
- VITRUM Laugaricio, Glass Centre of Competence is the joint research laboratory, Trenčín, Slovakia "Vitrum Laugaricio - Glass Centre of Competence is the joint research laboratory".
- Department of Glass and Ceramics, Institute of Chemical Technology, Prague, Czech Republic "Department of Glass and Ceramics".
- Department of Materials technologies and environmental, Faculty of Industrial Technologies Alexander Dubcek University in Puchov, Slovakia"FPT TU Puchov, Slovakia".
- Slovak Glass Society, Lednicke Rovne, Slovakia"SGS Puchov, Slovakia".
- Union of Glass Industry of the Slovak Republic, Bratislava "Union of Glass Industry, Slovakia".

== Museum ==
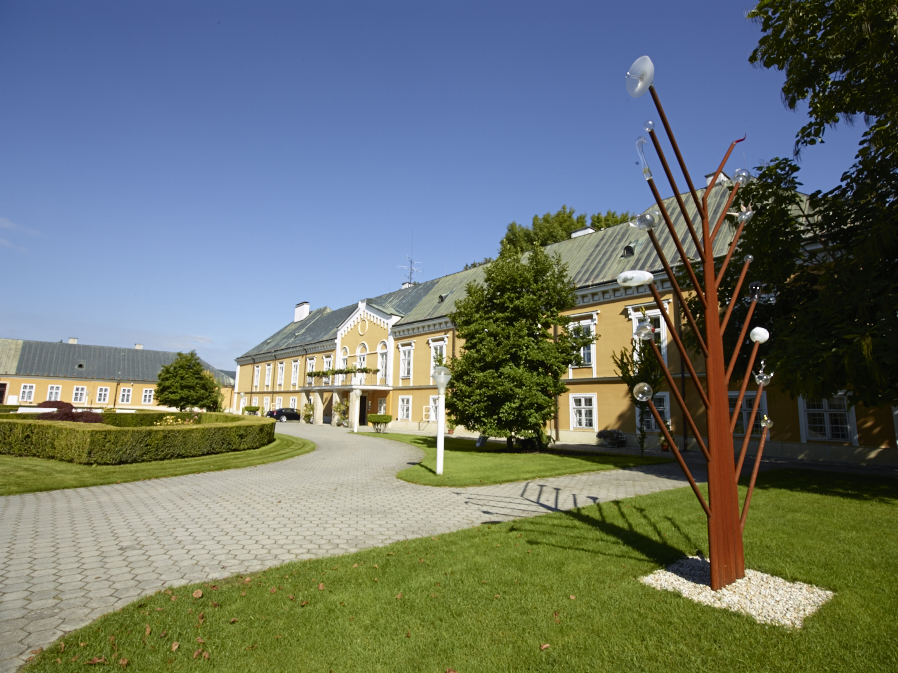
Castle-museum, Lednické Rovne, Slovakia

The Slovak Glass Museum, founded in 1988, connects the modern glassworks with its historical roots. The headquarters of the museum is a castle that was the former residence of founders of the company, reconstructed at the end of the 1980s. Today, it is used as a product showroom and administrative center, and it is used to host a biennial international glass symposium.

The history of the company's production at Lednické Rovne is documented by various collections, saved in deposits of galleries and museums such as Slovak National Museum – Historical Museum in Bratislava, Central Slovakia Museum in Banská Bystrica, Slovak National Museum – Ethnographical museum in Martin, Slovak National Gallery in Bratislava, Museum of Decorative Arts in Prague, and Corning Museum of Glass in New York.

== Book publications ==
- Bárta Jan: Náčrt k dejinám sklářství na Slovensku. In: Sklářské rozhledy. 1947, č. 1, s. 9-12
- Mondok Ján: Z dejín výroby skla v Lednických Rovniach
- Húževka Milan: Hviezda výtvarného neba Karol Hološko. Bratislava: Ametyst, 2000, ISBN 9788089031580
- Janovíčková Marta: Úžitkové umenie a remeslo po roku 1900. In: Dejiny slovenského výtvarného umenia – 20. storočie. Ed. Rusinová Zora, Bratislava: SNG, 2000, ISBN 8080590311, s. 237-241
- Kolesár Zdeno: Genéza a vývoj dizajnu. In: Dejiny slovenského výtvarného umenia – 20. storočie. Ed. Rusinová Zora, Bratislava: SNG, 2000, ISBN 8080590311, s. 256-261
- Schrammová Ágnes: Umenie a remeslo. In: Dejiny slovenského výtvarného umenia – 20. storočie. Ed. Rusinová Zora, Bratislava: SNG, 2000, ISBN 8080590311, s. 250-255
- Michalides Pavol: Umelecké remeslá na Slovensku. Bratislava: Tatran, 1980
- Michalides Pavol: Úžitková výtvarná tvorba na Slovensku. Od polovice 19. storočia po súčasnosť. Bratislava, Pallas, 1978
- Michalides Pavol: Výtvarná kultúra výroby. Bratislava: Slovenské pedagogické nakladateľstvo, 1984
- Palata Oldřich: Sklo na Světové výstavě Expo 58. In: Bruselský sen. Eds. Kramerová Daniela – Skálová Vanda, Praha: Arbor vitae, 2008, s. 116-131
- Palata Oldřich: Československé sklo po Světové výstavě Expo 58. In: Bruselský sen. Eds. Kramerová Daniela – Skálová Vanda, Praha: Arbor vitae, 2008, s. 276-287
- Toran Eduard: K umeniu okolo nás: užité umenie a priemyslové výtvarníctvo vo Sväze slovenských výtvarných umelcov. Bratislava: Slovenský fond výtvarného umenia, 1965
- Račeková Jarmila: Sto rokov sklárne v Lednických Rovniach 1892 – 1992. Spojené sklárne, Lednické Rovne, 1992
- Pišútová Irena – Bakošová Jindra: Katalóg slovenských sklární. In: Sborník Slovenského národného múzea. História, 17, 1977, s. 227-245
- Pišútová Irena – Bakošová Jindra: Katalóg slovenských sklární. In.: Sborník Slovenského národného múzea. História, 18, 1978, s. 154
- Pupala Štefan a kol.: 75 rokov Spojené sklárne Lednické Rovne 1892-1967. Spojené sklárne, Lednické Rovne, 1967
