= Lednické Rovne =

- Municipality
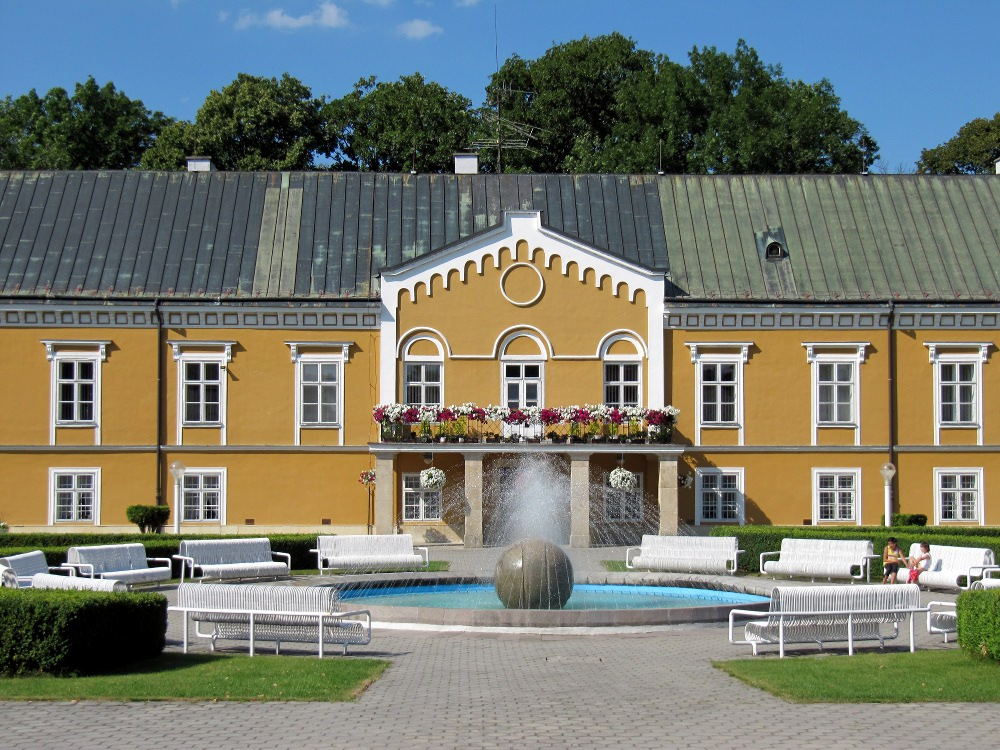

- Flag

- Location of Lednické Rovne in the Trenčín Region Location of Lednické Rovne in Slovakia
- Coordinates: 49.07°N 18.28°E
- Country: Slovakia
- Region: Trenčín Region
- District: Púchov District
- First mentioned: 1471

Area
  - Total: 10.74 km^{2} (4.15 sq mi)
- Elevation: 278 m (912 ft)

Population (2025)
  - Total: 3,887
- Time zone: UTC+1 (CET)
  - Summer (DST): UTC+2 (CEST)
- Postal code: 206 1
- Area code: +421 42
- Vehicle registration plate (until 2022): PU
- Website: www.lednickerovne.sk

Lednické Rovne (Hungarian: Lednicróna) is a village and municipality in Púchov District in the Trenčín Region of north-western Slovakia. The municipality consists of three parts:

- Lednické Rovne
- Horenická Hôrka
- Medné

== Geography ==
The municipality lies at an altitude of 278 metres (912 ft) and covers an area of 10.74 km^{2} (4.15 sq mi) (2025).

== Population ==
Population statistic (10 years)
| Year | 1995 | 2005 | 2015 | 2025 |
|---|---|---|---|---|
| Count | 4060 | 4192 | 4072 | 3887 |
| Difference | | +3.25% | −2.86% | −4.54% |

Population statistic
| Year | 2024 | 2025 |
|---|---|---|
| Count | 3844 | 3887 |
| Difference | | +1.11% |

It has a population of 3887 people (31 December 2025).

=== Ethnicity ===
Census 2021 (1+ %)
| Ethnicity | Number | Fraction |
|---|---|---|
| Slovak | 3832 | 96.67% |
| Not found out | 135 | 3.4% |
| Total | 3964 | |

In year 2021 was 3964 people by ethnicity 3832 as Slovak, 135 as Not found out, 36 as Czech, 17 as Romani, 9 as Russian, 5 as English, 4 as Irish, 4 as Serbian, 4 as Romanian, 4 as Other, 3 as Rusyn, 3 as Hungarian, 2 as Italian, 2 as Polish, 2 as German, 2 as Moravian, 2 as Bulgarian, 1 as Canadian, 1 as Greek and 1 as French.

Note on population: The difference values of population numbers in the table "Population statistic" and in the sections "Ethnicity" & "Religion" is caused by the use of various statistical methods.

=== Religion ===
Census 2021 (1+ %)
| Religion | Number | Fraction |
|---|---|---|
| Roman Catholic Church | 2946 | 74.32% |
| None | 706 | 17.81% |
| Not found out | 140 | 3.53% |
| Evangelical Church | 78 | 1.97% |
| Total | 3964 | |

In year 2021 was 3964 people by religion 2946 from Roman Catholic Church, 706 from None, 140 from Not found out, 78 from Evangelical Church, 22 from Greek Catholic Church, 16 from Christian Congregations in Slovakia, 12 from Other, 12 from Ad hoc movements, 6 from Jehovah's Witnesses, 5 from Calvinist Church, 5 from Seventh-day Adventist Church, 3 from Eastern Orthodox Church, 3 from Paganism and natural spirituality, 2 from Other and not ascertained christian church, 2 from United Methodist Church, 2 from Buddhism, 1 from Old Catholic Church, 1 from Islam, 1 from Czechoslovak Hussite Church and 1 from Apostolic Church.

98.08% inhabitants were Slovaks and 1.03% Czechs

According to the 2001 census the religious makeup was:

85.78% Roman Catholics
10.07% people with no religious affiliation
2.13% Lutherans

== Sights ==
- St. Michael's Church (1926)
- Museum (glass)
- kaplnka svätej Anny

== Industry ==
RONA a.s. - glassworks, glasscrafts & glassware (1892)
