= Púchov District =

Coordinates: 49°7′30″N 18°19′49″E

- District
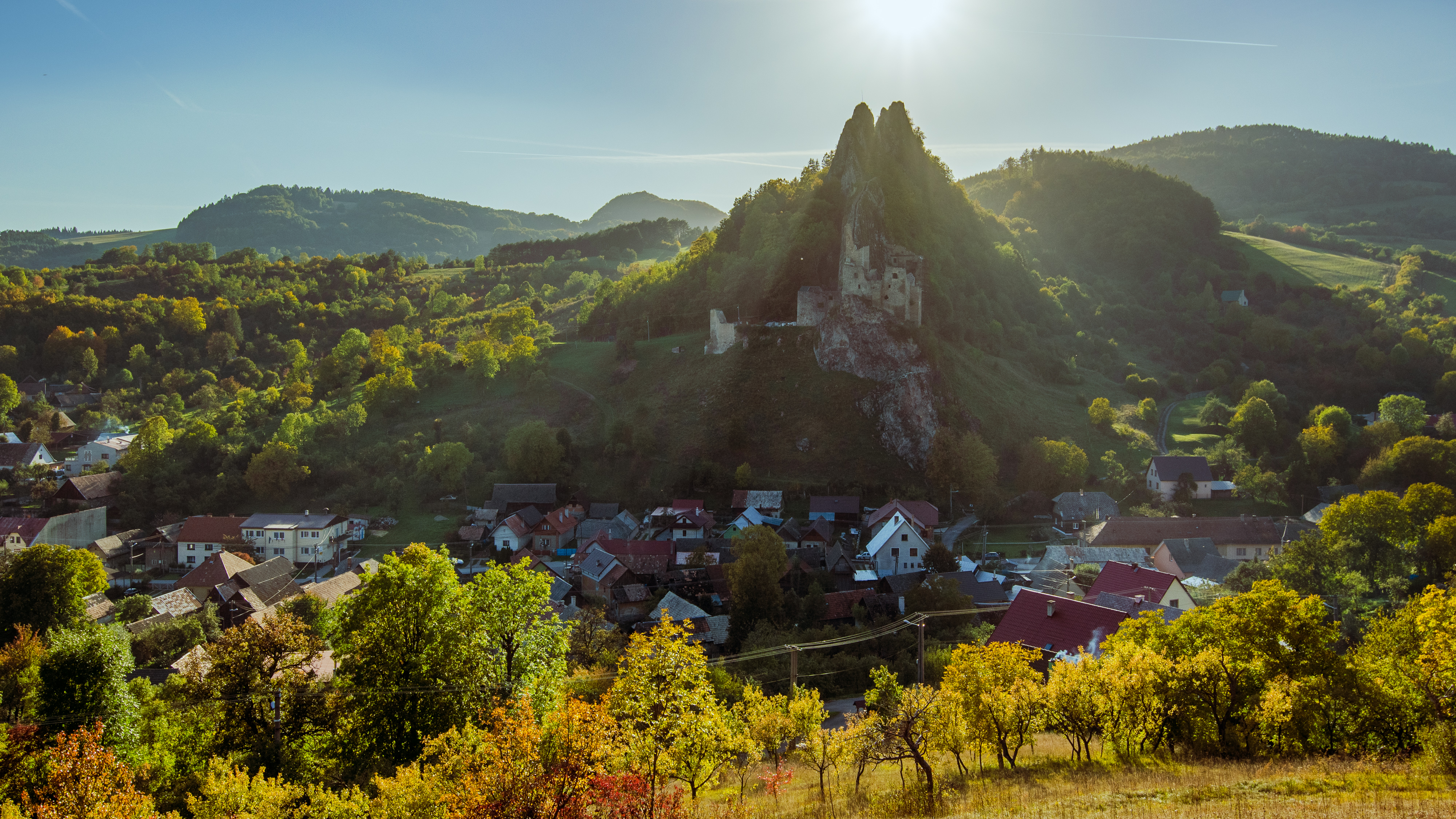
- Lednica castle above Lednica
- Country: Slovakia
- Region (kraj): Trenčín Region
- Seat: Púchov

Area
  - Total: 375.10 km^{2} (144.83 sq mi)

Population (2025)
  - Total: 43,318
- Time zone: UTC+1 (CET)
  - Summer (DST): UTC+2 (CEST)
- Telephone prefix: 042
- Vehicle registration plate (until 2022): PU
- Municipalities: 21

Púchov District (Slovak: okres Púchov, Hungarian: Puhói járás) is a district in the Trenčín Region of western Slovakia. Until 1918, the district was part of the county of Kingdom of Hungary of Trencsén. It belongs to Upper Váh region of tourism.

== Population ==
Population statistic (10 years)
Year	1995	2005	2015	2025
Count	45,703	45,601	44,457	43,318
Difference		−0.22%	−2.50%	−2.56%

Population statistic
Year	2024	2025
Count	43,483	43,318
Difference		−0.37%

It has a population of 43,318 people (31 December 2025).

Historical population
Year	Pop.	±%
1970	40,454	—
1980	43,669	+7.9%
1991	45,103	+3.3%
2001	45,761	+1.5%
2011	44,659	−2.4%
2021	44,319	−0.8%
Source: Statistical Office of the Slovak Republic

=== Ethnicity ===
Census 2021 (1+ %)
Ethnicity	Number	Fraction
Slovak	42,414	94.03%
Not found out	1686	3.73%
Czech	481	1.06%
Total	45,106	

In year 2021 was 45,106 people by ethnicity 42,414 as Slovak, 1686 as Not found out, 481 as Czech, 113 as Other, 71 as Russian, 61 as Romani, 33 as Rusyn, 33 as German, 31 as Hungarian, 29 as Polish, 25 as Serbian, 21 as Moravian, 13 as Bulgarian, 12 as Italian, 11 as Ukrainian, 11 as Romanian, 10 as English, 9 as Canadian, 8 as Irish, 6 as Greek, 5 as Jewish, 5 as Croatian, 4 as Chinese, 4 as Vietnamese, 3 as Austrian, 3 as Korean, 2 as French, 1 as Silesian and 1 as Albanian.

Note on population: The difference values of population numbers in the table "Population statistic" and in the sections "Ethnicity" & "Religion" is caused by the use of various statistical methods.

=== Religion ===
Census 2021 (1+ %)
Religion	Number	Fraction
Roman Catholic Church	29,843	67.34%
None	6612	14.92%
Evangelical Church	4801	10.83%
Not found out	2058	4.64%
Total	44,319	

In year 2021 was 44,319 people by religion 29,843 from Roman Catholic Church, 6612 from None, 4801 from Evangelical Church, 2058 from Not found out, 215 from Greek Catholic Church, 176 from Ad hoc movements, 128 from Christian Congregations in Slovakia, 105 from Other, 59 from Eastern Orthodox Church, 55 from Other and not ascertained christian church, 43 from Paganism and natural spirituality, 41 from Buddhism, 31 from Calvinist Church, 29 from Seventh-day Adventist Church, 20 from Jehovah's Witnesses, 20 from Apostolic Church, 19 from Islam, 15 from Old Catholic Church, 15 from United Methodist Church, 12 from Church of the Brethren, 11 from Hinduism, 4 from Bahá'i Community, 3 from Jewish community, 2 from Czechoslovak Hussite Church, 1 from Church of Jesus Christ of Latter-day Saints and 1 from Baptists Church.

== Municipalities ==
Municipality	Area [km^{2}]	Population
Beluša	51.32	6,199
Dohňany	28.75	1,916
Dolná Breznica	8.36	1,083
Dolné Kočkovce	6.12	1,163
Horná Breznica	12.27	500
Horovce	5.35	941
Kvašov	7.46	632
Lazy pod Makytou	49.86	1,211
Lednica	22.65	893
Lednické Rovne	10.74	3,887
Lúky	7.73	887
Lysá pod Makytou	33.40	1,939
Mestečko	5.42	485
Mojtín	10.84	429
Nimnica	7.35	718
Púchov	41.44	16,622
Streženice	7.98	1,117
Visolaje	9.67	951
Vydrná	13.43	252
Záriečie	9.41	683
Zubák	25.66	810

Population and area values are current for year 2025.
