= Dohňany =

Village in Slovakia

- Municipality
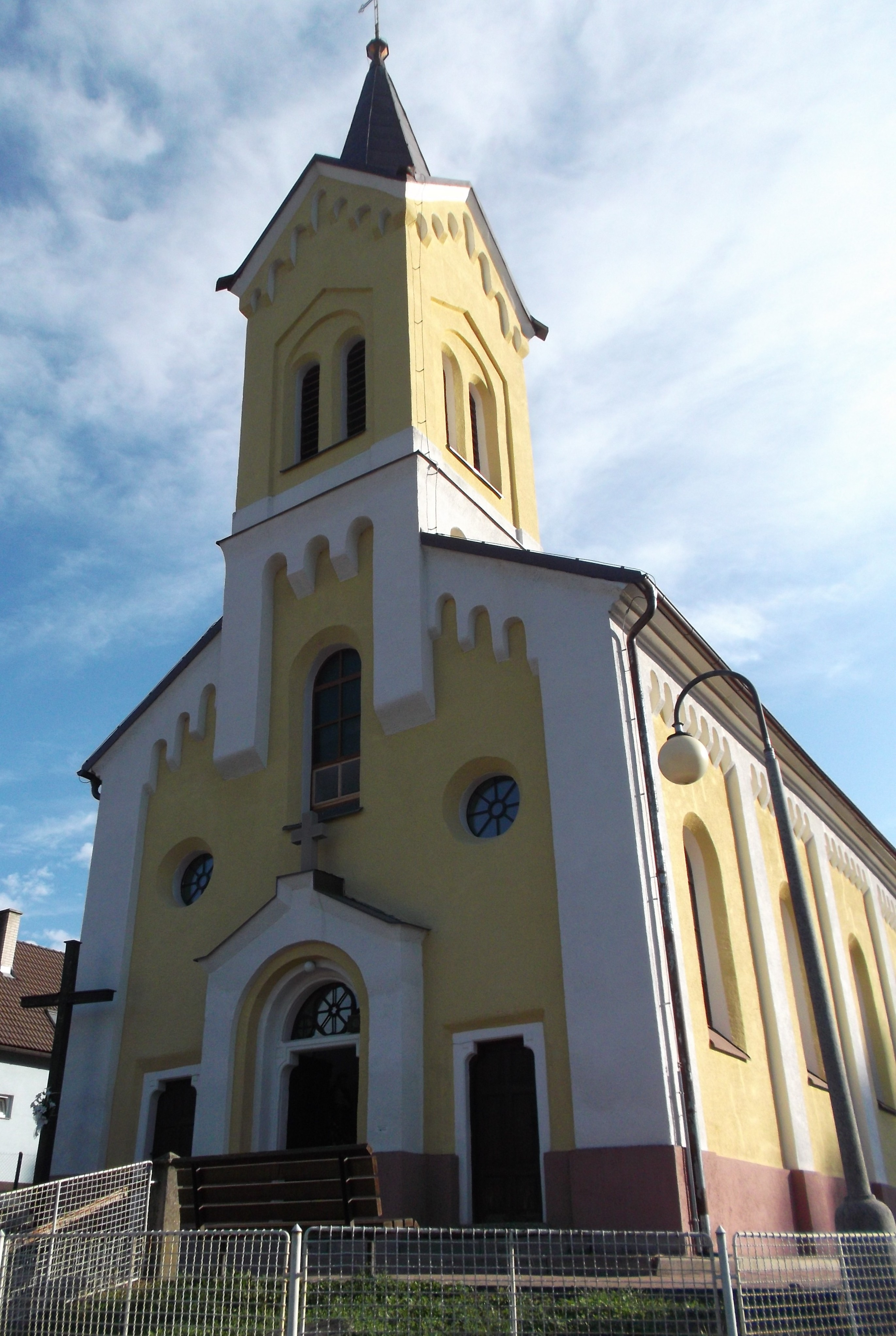
- Church of Saints Cyril and Methodius

- Flag

- Location of Dohňany in the Trenčín Region Location of Dohňany in Slovakia
- Coordinates: 49.15°N 18.30°E
- Country: Slovakia
- Region: Trenčín Region
- District: Púchov District
- First mentioned: 1471

Area
  - Total: 28.75 km^{2} (11.10 sq mi)
- Elevation: 336 m (1,102 ft)

Population (2025)
  - Total: 1,916
- Time zone: UTC+1 (CET)
  - Summer (DST): UTC+2 (CEST)
- Postal code: 205 1
- Area code: +421 42
- Vehicle registration plate (until 2022): PU
- Website: www.dohnany.sk

Dohňany (Hungarian: Donány) is a village and municipality in Púchov District in the Trenčín Region of north-western Slovakia.

== History ==
In historical records the village was first mentioned in 1471.

== Geography ==
The municipality lies at an altitude of 336 metres (1,102 ft) and covers an area of 28.75 km^{2} (11.10 sq mi) (2025).

== Population ==
Population statistic (10 years)
Year	1995	2005	2015	2025
Count	1708	1758	1773	1916
Difference		+2.92%	+0.85%	+8.06%

Population statistic
Year	2024	2025
Count	1903	1916
Difference		+0.68%

It has a population of 1916 people (31 December 2025).

=== Ethnicity ===
Census 2021 (1+ %)
Ethnicity	Number	Fraction
Slovak	1825	98.17%
Not found out	30	1.61%
Total	1859	

In year 2021 was 1859 people by ethnicity 1825 as Slovak, 30 as Not found out, 15 as Czech, 2 as Romani, 2 as Rusyn, 1 as Russian, 1 as Hungarian and 1 as Other.

Note on population: The difference values of population numbers in the table "Population statistic" and in the sections "Ethnicity" & "Religion" is caused by the use of various statistical methods.

=== Religion ===
Census 2021 (1+ %)
Religion	Number	Fraction
Roman Catholic Church	1063	57.18%
Evangelical Church	538	28.94%
None	196	10.54%
Not found out	31	1.67%
Total	1859	

In year 2021 was 1859 people by religion 1063 from Roman Catholic Church, 538 from Evangelical Church, 196 from None, 31 from Not found out, 11 from Ad hoc movements, 8 from Greek Catholic Church, 3 from Other and not ascertained christian church, 2 from Christian Congregations in Slovakia, 2 from Seventh-day Adventist Church, 2 from Buddhism, 1 from Eastern Orthodox Church, 1 from Paganism and natural spirituality and 1 from Jehovah's Witnesses.

== Genealogical resources ==
The records for genealogical research are available at the state archive "Statny Archiv in Bytca, Slovakia"

- Roman Catholic church records (births/marriages/deaths): 1865-1897 (parish A)
- Lutheran church records (births/marriages/deaths): 1784-1909 (parish B)

== See also ==
- List of municipalities and towns in Slovakia
