= Lysá pod Makytou =

- Municipality
- Flag

- Location of Lysá pod Makytou in the Trenčín Region Location of Lysá pod Makytou in Slovakia
- Coordinates: 49.20°N 18.20°E
- Country: Slovakia
- Region: Trenčín Region
- District: Púchov District
- First mentioned: 1471

Area
  - Total: 33.40 km^{2} (12.90 sq mi)
- Elevation: 402 m (1,319 ft)

Population (2025)
  - Total: 1,939
- Time zone: UTC+1 (CET)
  - Summer (DST): UTC+2 (CEST)
- Postal code: 205 4
- Area code: +421 42
- Vehicle registration plate (until 2022): PU
- Website: www.lysapodmakytou.sk

Lysá pod Makytou (Hungarian: Fehérhalom) is a village and municipality in Púchov District in the Trenčín Region of north-western Slovakia.

== History ==
In historical records the village was first mentioned in 1471.

== Geography ==
The municipality lies at an altitude of 402 metres (1,319 ft) and covers an area of 33.40 km^{2} (12.90 sq mi) (2025).

== Population ==
Population statistic (10 years)
Year	1995	2005	2015	2025
Count	2161	2134	2109	1939
Difference		−1.24%	−1.17%	−8.06%

Population statistic
Year	2024	2025
Count	1964	1939
Difference		−1.27%

It has a population of 1939 people (31 December 2025).

=== Ethnicity ===
Census 2021 (1+ %)
Ethnicity	Number	Fraction
Slovak	2012	97.43%
Czech	71	3.43%
Not found out	26	1.25%
Total	2065	

In year 2021 was 2065 people by ethnicity 2012 as Slovak, 71 as Czech, 26 as Not found out, 4 as German, 3 as Hungarian, 2 as Russian, 2 as Other, 1 as Romanian, 1 as Croatian and 1 as English.

Note on population: The difference values of population numbers in the table "Population statistic" and in the sections "Ethnicity" & "Religion" is caused by the use of various statistical methods.

=== Religion ===
Census 2021 (1+ %)
Religion	Number	Fraction
Roman Catholic Church	1746	84.55%
None	154	7.46%
Evangelical Church	72	3.49%
Not found out	58	2.81%
Total	2065	

In year 2021 was 2065 people by religion 1746 from Roman Catholic Church, 154 from None, 72 from Evangelical Church, 58 from Not found out, 8 from Greek Catholic Church, 7 from Ad hoc movements, 5 from Paganism and natural spirituality, 5 from Christian Congregations in Slovakia, 2 from Other, 1 from Calvinist Church, 1 from Other and not ascertained christian church, 1 from Hinduism, 1 from Czechoslovak Hussite Church, 1 from Church of the Brethren, 1 from Seventh-day Adventist Church, 1 from Buddhism and 1 from Apostolic Church.
