= Púchov =

- Municipality
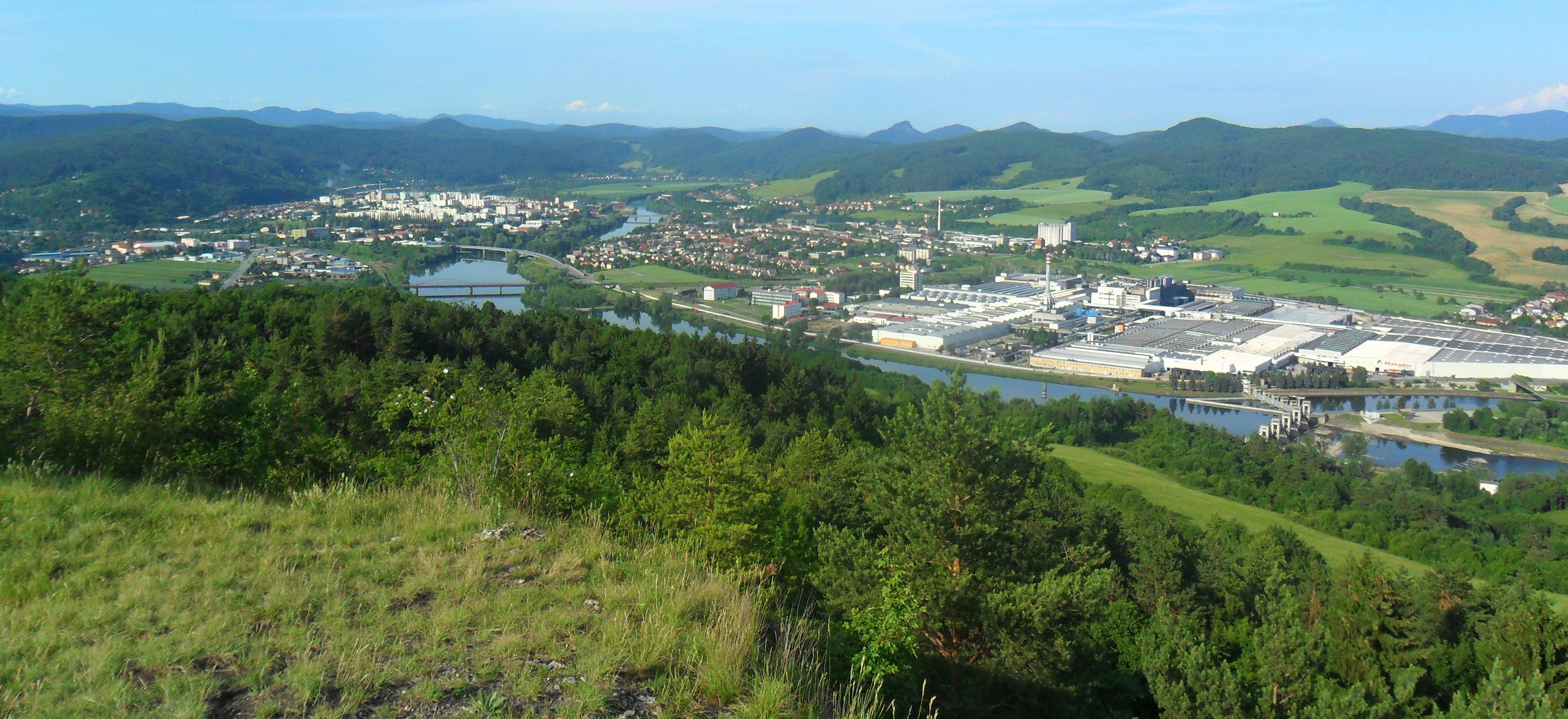

- Flag Coat of arms

- Location of Púchov in the Trenčín Region Location of Púchov in Slovakia
- Coordinates: 49.12°N 18.33°E
- Country: Slovakia
- Region: Trenčín Region
- District: Púchov District
- First mentioned: 1243

Government
  - Mayor: Katarína Heneková

Area
  - Total: 41.44 km^{2} (16.00 sq mi)
- Elevation: 300 m (980 ft)

Population (2025)
  - Total: 16,622
- Time zone: UTC+1 (CET)
  - Summer (DST): UTC+2 (CEST)
- Postal code: 200 1
- Area code: +421 42
- Vehicle registration plate (until 2022): PU
- Website: www.puchov.sk

Púchov (German: Puchau; Hungarian: Puhó) is an industrial town in the centre of Púchov District in Slovakia, with a population close to 18,000.

== Geography ==
The municipality lies at an altitude of 300 metres (980 ft) and covers an area of 41.44 km^{2} (16.00 sq mi) (2025).

It is located on the main train line between Bratislava and Košice. It is halfway between Trenčín and Žilina, two major Slovak cities, approximately 30 minutes train from both cities.

The Váh river crosses Púchov, and there is a small dam open to public crossing.

The health resort Nimnica (until 1990 part of Púchov) is situated in the vicinity and is a starting point for tours to Javorníky and White Carpathians mountains.

Parts:

- Horné Kočkovce
- Hoštiná
- Hrabovka
- Ihrište
- Nosice (with a hydroelectric power plant)
- Púchov (proper)
- Vieska - Bezdedov

== History ==
The nearness of the Váh river and town's strategic location contributed to create cultural and social relations, which were a part of its history. The first written reference dates back to 1243, when Béla IV., King of Hungary, signed his gift certificate to Vychlap Bechend. In this reference are also mentioned Leustrak's son and Puch from his immediate vicinities. The word "puch" is of Indo-European origin and it can be translated as "puffed up", "haughty" and "ov" is a possessive suffix, therefore this name can be translated as a former "land of Puch". There exist another version, that origin of town's name originates from the word "Pochov", which denotes a place many deceased from the whole vicinities were buried in the past. This claim was supported by many archaeological excavations of the graves throughout the centuries. Púchov vicinities, especially Púchovská skala (Púchov rock) was settled earlier during palaeolithic period. The excavations give evidence of settlements since the early Stone Age to the Roman period. During 1888-1894 an Austrian Army commissioned officer, an amateur archaeologist, baron Emil Friedrich Johannes Hoenning O'Carroll carried out an exploration of Púchovská Skala and his discovery of two bronze swords explained the town's ancient history. His discoveries later contributed to the origin of the official archaeological name Púchov culture. During the 7th – 8th centuries was the town settled by Slavs and in the 9th century the Moravian settlements shared the most expansion. In 1469 Matthias Corvinus, the King of Hungary, gave Púchov homestead to the Marczibányis, who were the lineal descendants of Púchovs since the 13th century.

== Population ==
Historical population
Year	Pop.	±%
1970	10,505	—
1980	14,617	+39.1%
1991	18,311	+25.3%
2001	18,833	+2.9%
2011	18,168	−3.5%
2021	17,472	−3.8%
Source: Censuses

Population statistic (10 years)
Year	1995	2005	2015	2025
Count	18,969	18,658	17,962	16,622
Difference		−1.63%	−3.73%	−7.46%

Population statistic
Year	2024	2025
Count	16,781	16,622
Difference		−0.94%

It has a population of 16,622 people (31 December 2025).

=== Ethnicity ===
Census 2021 (1+%)
Ethnicity	Number	Fraction
Slovak	16,307	93.33%
Not found out	1024	5.86%
Czech	222	1.27%
Total	17,472	

In year 2021 was 17,472 people by ethnicity 16,307 as Slovak, 1024 as Not found out, 222 as Czech, 57 as Other, 37 as Romani, 30 as Russian, 19 as German, 16 as Polish, 15 as Hungarian, 14 as Rusyn, 13 as Moravian, 12 as Serbian, 8 as Bulgarian, 5 as Canadian, 4 as Chinese, 3 as Jewish, 3 as Ukrainian, 3 as Italian, 3 as Austrian, 3 as Korean, 3 as Croatian, 2 as Irish, 2 as Vietnamese, 2 as Romanian, 2 as English, 1 as French and 1 as Albanian.

Note on population: The difference values of population numbers in the table "Population statistic" and in the sections "Ethnicity" & "Religion" is caused by the use of various statistical methods.

=== Religion ===
Census 2021 (1+%)
Religion	Number	Fraction
Roman Catholic Church	10,314	59.03%
None	3457	19.79%
Evangelical Church	1989	11.38%
Not found out	1272	7.28%
Total	17,472	

In year 2021 was 17,472 people by religion 10,314 from Roman Catholic Church, 3457 from None, 1989 from Evangelical Church, 1272 from Not found out, 107 from Greek Catholic Church, 72 from Ad hoc movements, 55 from Other, 43 from Christian Congregations in Slovakia, 25 from Buddhism, 23 from Eastern Orthodox Church, 20 from Other and not ascertained christian church, 15 from Paganism and natural spirituality, 14 from Apostolic Church, 12 from Seventh-day Adventist Church, 10 from Church of the Brethren, 9 from Jehovah's Witnesses, 8 from Islam, 7 from Calvinist Church, 7 from Hinduism, 6 from Old Catholic Church, 2 from Jewish community, 2 from United Methodist Church, 2 from Bahá'i Community and 1 from Church of Jesus Christ of Latter-day Saints.

== Economy ==
It is a strong industry base - home to Matador and Continental Tire plants, producers of pneumatic tyres, and Makyta, a producer of fashion clothes. Matador is a 20-minute walk from the train station in Púchov, while the city center is a 10-minute walk in the other direction.

== Sport ==
The number one sport in the town is football. The local team FK Matador Púchov had several successful seasons in the Slovak highest league, but currently is only in the Slovak second league. Among other sports, there has been a long tradition of swimming. Several of the best swimmers made it to the European championship.

Some other sport clubs worth mentioning are volleyball and handball.

The local ice hockey team is actually the Slovak National Ice Hockey Team under 20. The team named "Slovakia 20" is a permanent member of the highest Ice Hockey league. This was done as an experiment to help the young players to get more tough matches and increase their motivation.

Cyclists, Peter and Martin Velits, come from Púchov as well.

Slovak Bandy Association has organised rink bandy practice in Púchov.

== Culture and education ==
The town has several high schools and a branch of the Slovak University of Technology.

== Twin towns – sister cities ==
Púchov is twinned with:

- Bela Cerkev, Ukraine
- Hlinsko, Czech Republic
- Omsk, Russia
- Stara Pazova, Serbia
