= Dolné Kočkovce =

- Municipality
- Flag

- Location of Dolné Kočkovce in the Trenčín Region Location of Dolné Kočkovce in Slovakia
- Coordinates: 49.10°N 18.32°E
- Country: Slovakia
- Region: Trenčín Region
- District: Púchov District
- First mentioned: 1332

Area
  - Total: 6.12 km^{2} (2.36 sq mi)
- Elevation: 260 m (850 ft)

Population (2025)
  - Total: 1,163
- Time zone: UTC+1 (CET)
  - Summer (DST): UTC+2 (CEST)
- Postal code: 200 1
- Area code: +421 42
- Vehicle registration plate (until 2022): PU
- Website: www.dolnekockovce.sk

Dolné Kočkovce (Hungarian: Alsókocskóc) is a village and municipality in Púchov District in the Trenčín Region of north-western Slovakia.

== History ==
In historical records the village was first mentioned in 1332.

== Geography ==
The municipality lies at an altitude of 260 metres (850 ft) and covers an area of 6.12 km^{2} (2.36 sq mi) (2025).

== Population ==
Population statistic (10 years)
Year	1995	2005	2015	2025
Count	1164	1212	1232	1163
Difference		+4.12%	+1.65%	−5.60%

Population statistic
Year	2024	2025
Count	1177	1163
Difference		−1.18%

It has a population of 1163 people (31 December 2025).

=== Ethnicity ===
Census 2021 (1+ %)
Ethnicity	Number	Fraction
Slovak	1177	97.67%
Not found out	27	2.24%
Total	1205	

In year 2021 was 1205 people by ethnicity 1177 as Slovak, 27 as Not found out, 12 as Czech, 4 as Russian, 4 as Greek, 2 as Other, 1 as Romani and 1 as Moravian.

Note on population: The difference values of population numbers in the table "Population statistic" and in the sections "Ethnicity" & "Religion" is caused by the use of various statistical methods.

=== Religion ===
Census 2021 (1+ %)
Religion	Number	Fraction
Roman Catholic Church	968	80.33%
None	154	12.78%
Evangelical Church	40	3.32%
Not found out	21	1.74%
Total	1205	

In year 2021 was 1205 people by religion 968 from Roman Catholic Church, 154 from None, 40 from Evangelical Church, 21 from Not found out, 7 from Ad hoc movements, 5 from Christian Congregations in Slovakia, 3 from Eastern Orthodox Church, 3 from Greek Catholic Church, 2 from Apostolic Church, 1 from Other and 1 from Buddhism.

== Genealogical resources ==
The records for genealogical research are available at the state archive "Statny Archiv in Bytča, Slovakia"

- Roman Catholic church records (births/marriages/deaths): 1714-1901 (parish B)

== See also ==
- List of municipalities and towns in Slovakia
