= Zubák =

- Municipality
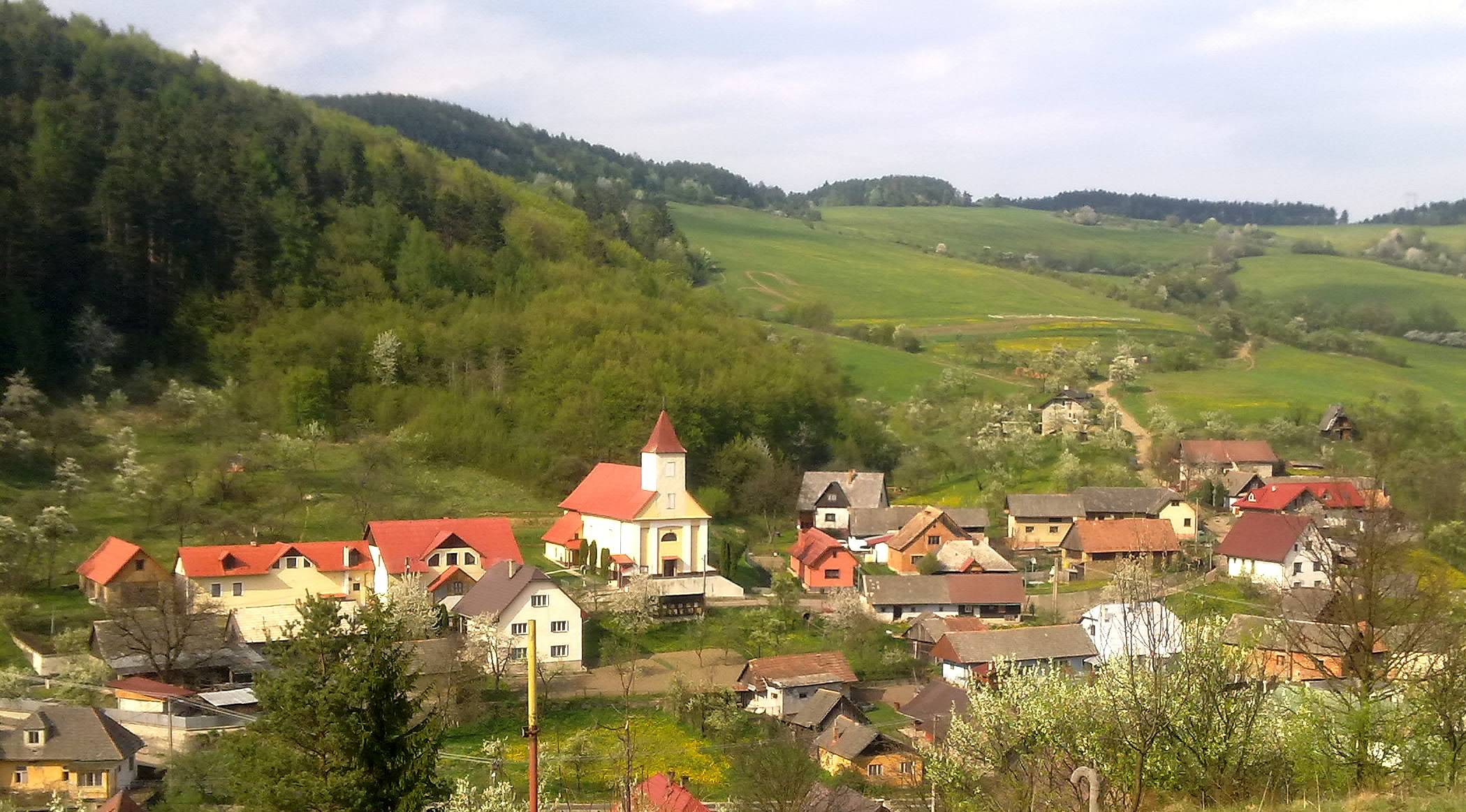

- Flag

- Location of Zubák in the Trenčín Region Location of Zubák in Slovakia
- Coordinates: 49.15°N 18.22°E
- Country: Slovakia
- Region: Trenčín Region
- District: Púchov District
- First mentioned: 1471

Area
  - Total: 25.66 km^{2} (9.91 sq mi)
- Elevation: 418 m (1,371 ft)

Population (2025)
  - Total: 810
- Time zone: UTC+1 (CET)
  - Summer (DST): UTC+2 (CEST)
- Postal code: 206 4
- Area code: +421 42
- Vehicle registration plate (until 2022): PU
- Website: www.obeczubak.sk

Zubák (Hungarian: Trencsénfogas) is a village and municipality in Púchov District in the Trenčín Region of north-western Slovakia.

== History ==
In historical records the village was first mentioned in 1471.

== Geography ==
The municipality lies at an altitude of 418 metres (1,371 ft) and covers an area of 25.66 km^{2} (9.91 sq mi) (2025).

== Population ==
Population statistic (10 years)
Year	1995	2005	2015	2025
Count	913	917	843	810
Difference		+0.43%	−8.06%	−3.91%

Population statistic
Year	2024	2025
Count	830	810
Difference		−2.40%

It has a population of 810 people (31 December 2025).

=== Ethnicity ===
Census 2021 (1+ %)
Ethnicity	Number	Fraction
Slovak	813	98.06%
Not found out	12	1.44%
Total	829	

In year 2021 was 829 people by ethnicity 813 as Slovak, 12 as Not found out, 7 as Czech, 1 as Serbian, 1 as Rusyn and 1 as Hungarian.

Note on population: The difference values of population numbers in the table "Population statistic" and in the sections "Ethnicity" & "Religion" is caused by the use of various statistical methods.

=== Religion ===
Census 2021 (1+ %)
Religion	Number	Fraction
Roman Catholic Church	711	85.77%
None	70	8.44%
Not found out	17	2.05%
Evangelical Church	12	1.45%
Total	829	

In year 2021 was 829 people by religion 711 from Roman Catholic Church, 70 from None, 17 from Not found out, 12 from Evangelical Church, 8 from Christian Congregations in Slovakia, 6 from Calvinist Church, 2 from Ad hoc movements, 1 from Eastern Orthodox Church, 1 from Other and 1 from Greek Catholic Church.
