= Horovce, Púchov District =

Horovce
- Municipality
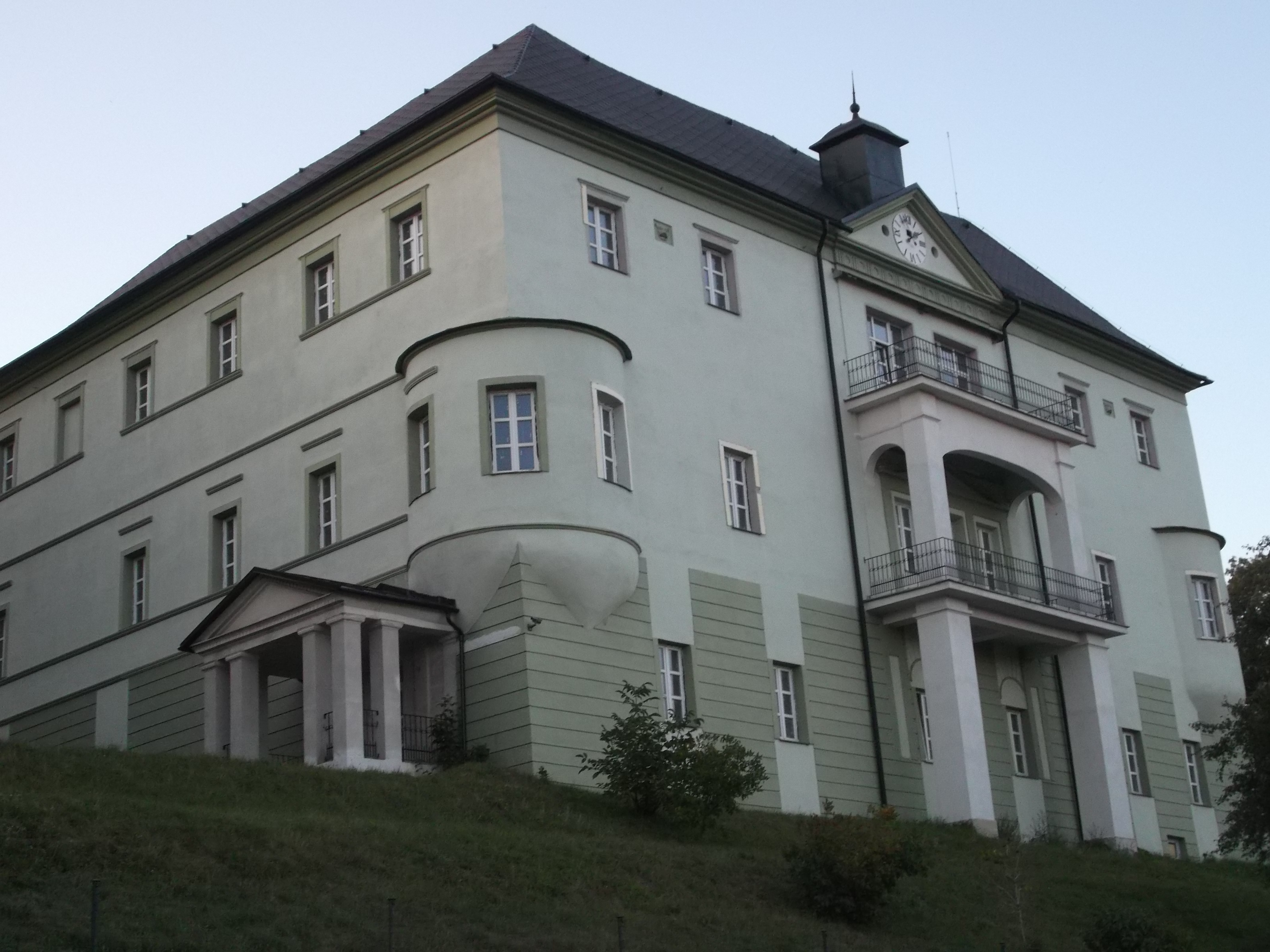

- Flag

- Location of Horovce in the Trenčín Region Location of Horovce in Slovakia
- Coordinates: 49.0453°N 18.2567°E
- Country: Slovakia
- Region: Trenčín Region
- District: Púchov District
- First mentioned: 1259

Area
  - Total: 5.35 km^{2} (2.07 sq mi)
- Elevation: 249 m (817 ft)

Population (2025)
  - Total: 941
- Time zone: UTC+1 (CET)
  - Summer (DST): UTC+2 (CEST)
- Postal code: 206 2
- Area code: +421 42
- Vehicle registration plate (until 2022): PU
- Website: horovce.eu

Horovce (Hungarian: Horóc) is a village and municipality in Púchov District in the Trenčín Region of north-western Slovakia.

== History ==
In historical records the village was first mentioned in 1259.

== Geography ==
The municipality lies at an altitude of 249 metres (817 ft) and covers an area of 5.35 km^{2} (2.07 sq mi) (2025).

== Population ==
Population statistic (10 years)
Year	1995	2005	2015	2025
Count	810	793	855	941
Difference		−2.09%	+7.81%	+10.05%

Population statistic
Year	2024	2025
Count	917	941
Difference		+2.61%

It has a population of 941 people (31 December 2025).

=== Ethnicity ===
Census 2021 (1+ %)
Ethnicity	Number	Fraction
Slovak	817	97.26%
Not found out	23	2.73%
Total	840	

In year 2021 was 840 people by ethnicity 817 as Slovak, 23 as Not found out, 2 as German, 1 as Czech and 1 as Romanian.

Note on population: The difference values of population numbers in the table "Population statistic" and in the sections "Ethnicity" & "Religion" is caused by the use of various statistical methods.

=== Religion ===
Census 2021 (1+ %)
Religion	Number	Fraction
Roman Catholic Church	727	86.55%
None	69	8.21%
Not found out	23	2.74%
Evangelical Church	10	1.19%
Total	840	

In year 2021 was 840 people by religion 727 from Roman Catholic Church, 69 from None, 23 from Not found out, 10 from Evangelical Church, 3 from Christian Congregations in Slovakia, 2 from Ad hoc movements, 1 from Eastern Orthodox Church, 1 from Paganism and natural spirituality, 1 from Other and not ascertained christian church, 1 from Islam, 1 from Other and 1 from Greek Catholic Church.

== Genealogical resources ==
The records for genealogical research are available at the state archive "Statny Archiv in Bytca, Slovakia"

- Roman Catholic church records (births/marriages/deaths): 1671-1918 (parish B)

== See also ==
- List of municipalities and towns in Slovakia
