= Zubac =

Zubac is a South Slavic surname.

Notable people with the surname include:

- Domagoj Zubac (1990–2018), Bosnian Croat footballer
- Ivica Zubac (born 1997), Bosnia and Herzegovina-born Croatian basketball player
- Pero Zubac (born 1945), Bosnia and Herzegovina-born Serbian writer
- Vitalie Zubac (1894 – after 1918), Bessarabian politician
