= 2011–12 AS Trenčín season =

AS Trenčín
2011–12 season
- President: Tscheu La Ling
- Head coach: Adrián Guľa
- Stadium: Stadium na Sihoti, Trenčín
- Corgoň Liga: 5th
- Slovnaft Cup: Round of 16
- Top goalscorer: League: Peltier (11); All: Peltier (11)
- Highest home attendance: 4,123 (vs Slovan Bratislava, 15 October 2011)
- Lowest home attendance: 1,310 (vs MŠK Žilina, 23 November 2011)
| Home colours | Away colours |

The 2011–12 AS Trenčín season was the 11th consecutive season that the club played in the Slovak First League, the highest tier of football in Slovakia.

== Squad ==
As of 20 May 2012
Note: Flags indicate national team as defined under FIFA eligibility rules; some limited exceptions apply. Players may hold more than one non-FIFA nationality.

| No. | Pos. | Nation | Player |
|---|---|---|---|
| 1 | GK | SVK | Miloš Volešák |
| 2 | DF | SVK | Martin Ševela (Captain) |
| 5 | DF | SRB | Mirko Radovanović |
| 6 | FW | SVK | Tomáš Malec |
| 8 | MF | ARG | Aldo Baéz |
| 9 | MF | PAR | Jorge Salinas |
| 10 | FW | ARG | David Depetris |
| 11 | MF | SVK | Vojtech Horváth |
| 13 | FW | SVK | Filip Hlohovský |
| 14 | MF | SVK | Jakub Holúbek |
| 15 | FW | SVK | Peter Mazan |
| 16 | MF | SVK | Gabriel Bezák |

| No. | Pos. | Nation | Player |
|---|---|---|---|
| 17 | DF | SVK | Peter Čögley |
| 19 | DF | SVK | Peter Kleščík |
| 20 | MF | ARG | Iván Díaz |
| 21 | DF | SVK | Boris Godál |
| 22 | MF | TTO | Lester Peltier |
| 23 | MF | SVK | Adam Morong |
| 24 | GK | SVK | Igor Šemrinec |
| 25 | FW | SVK | Peter Štyvar |
| 26 | MF | SVK | Samuel Štefánik |
| 27 | DF | SVK | Róbert Mazáň |
| 28 | DF | SEN | Papé Diakite |
| 29 | MF | SVK | Stanislav Lobotka |

== Transfers ==
=== In ===
| Date | Position | Player | From | Fee |
|---|---|---|---|---|
| 1 June 2011 | FW | (Slovakia) František Kubík | ADO Den Haag | Loan expiration |
| 12 July 2011 | GK | (Slovakia) Matej Vozár | Youth programme | |
| 12 July 2011 | DF | (Slovakia) Róbert Mazáň | Youth programme | |
| 12 July 2011 | MF | (Slovakia) Lukáš Kyselica | Youth programme | |
| 18 November 2011 | DF | (Senegal) Papé Diakite | Senegal | Free |
| 19 December 2011 | DF | (Bosnia and Herzegovina) Mirko Radovanović | Željezničar | Free |
| 8 February 2012 | MF | (Argentina) Iván Díaz | Panathinaikos | Undisclosed |
| 15 February 2012 | FW | (Slovakia) Peter Štyvar | Třinec | Undisclosed |
| 21 February 2012 | MF | (Slovakia) Gabriel Bezák | Youth programme | |

=== Out ===
| Date | Position | Player | To | Fee |
|---|---|---|---|---|
| 5 June 2011 | FW | (Slovakia) František Kubík | Kuban | €500,000 |
| 1 July 2011 | DF | (Slovakia) Tomáš Peciar | Žižkov | Free |
| 12 July 2011 | DF | (Slovakia) Milan Marušinec | Released | |
| 12 July 2011 | MF | (Colombia) Cristian Santana | Released | |
| 12 July 2011 | GK | (Slovakia) Erik Feriančík | Released | |
| 3 September 2011 | MF | (Slovakia) Patrik Mišák | Bohemians Prague | Free |
| 29 January 2012 | MF | (Slovakia) Lukáš Ďuriška | AGOVV Apeldoorn | Loan |
| 29 January 2012 | MF | (Slovakia) Karol Mondek | AGOVV Apeldoorn | Loan |
| 29 January 2012 | DF | (Slovakia) Róbert Mazáň | AGOVV Apeldoorn | Loan |
| 29 January 2012 | DF | (Slovakia) Roland Szabó | Nové Mesto nad Váhom | Loan |
| 21 February 2012 | DF | (Slovakia) Peter Valla | Piešťany | Loan |

== Pre-season and friendlies ==
| 21 June 2011 Friendly | AS Trenčín (Slovakia) | 2–1 | FC Petržalka 1898 (Slovakia) | Trenčín |
| 17:00 CEST | Holúbek 64'; Štefánik 90' | Report | Jendrišek 28' | Stadium: Stadium na Sihoti; Attendance: 50 |

| 24 June 2011 Friendly | Hradec Králové (Czech Republic) | 0–4 | AS Trenčín (Slovakia) | Svitavy, Czech Republic |
| 17:00 CEST | | Report | Depetris; Mitrevski; Štefánik; Peltier | Attendance: 350 |

| 30 June 2011 Friendly | Ostrava (Czech Republic) | 3–0 | AS Trenčín (Slovakia) | Ostrava, Czech Republic |
| 16:00 CEST | Řezník 26'; Kraut 28'; Musiol 64' | Report | | Stadium: Bazaly; Attendance: 220 |

| 2 July 2011 Friendly | Slovácko (Czech Republic) | 4–1 | AS Trenčín (Slovakia) | Uherské Hradiště, Czech Republic |
| 10:00 CEST | Hlúpik 27', 61'; Čtvrtníček 40'; Szmek 90' | Report | Holúbek 26' | Attendance: 150 |

| 6 July 2011 Friendly | Olomouc (Czech Republic) | 0–6 | AS Trenčín (Slovakia) | Kozlovice, Czech Republic |
| 17:00 CEST | | Report | Depetris 1', 18', 32', 61'; Salinas 54'; Godál 56' |

| 9 July 2011 Friendly | Třinec (Czech Republic) | 2–1 | AS Trenčín (Slovakia) | Třinec, Czech Republic |
| 17:00 CEST | Malíř (pen.); Nekuda | Report | Depetris | Attendance: 50 |

| 16 July 2011 Friendly | Nemšová (Slovakia) | 4–3 | AS Trenčín (Slovakia) |
| 10:00 CEST | Ďuriš 27'; Suchý 36'; Sečány 46'; Kozic 86' | Report | Malec 4'; Szabó 75'; Hlohovský 78' | Attendance: 50 |

| 16 August 2011 Friendly | AS Trenčín (Slovakia) | 2–0 | Dubnica (Slovakia) |
| 10:30 CEST | Malec 46'; Mazan 63' | Report |

| 2 September 2011 Friendly | Podbeskidzie Bielsko-Biała (Poland) | 2–0 | AS Trenčín (Slovakia) | Bielsko-Biała, Poland |
| 14:00 CEST | Malinowski 70'; Sikora 76' | Report | | Attendance: 70 |

| 5 October 2011 Friendly | FC Baník Horná Nitra (Slovakia) | 0–1 | AS Trenčín (Slovakia) | Prievidza |
| 16:30 CEST | | Report | Radovanović 28' | Attendance: 600 |

| 14 January 2012 Friendly | AS Trenčín (Slovakia) | 4–2 | Dubnica (Slovakia) | Trenčín |
| 10:00 CEST | Morong 1', 50'; Depetris 12', 29' | Report | Varga 67'; Ižvolt 74' | Stadium: Stadium na Sihoti |

| 14 January 2012 Friendly | AS Trenčín (Slovakia) | 5–1 | Dubnica (Slovakia) | Trenčín |
| 12:00 CEST | Malec 8', 15'; Štyvar 17'; Mondek 86', 90' | Report | Urban 87' | Stadium: Stadium na Sihoti; Attendance: 50 |

| 20 January 2012 Friendly | Otrokovice (Czech Republic) | 1–9 | AS Trenčín (Slovakia) | Staré Město, Czech Republic |
| 17:00 CEST | | Report | Ševela 11'; Mondek 18', 79'; Bezák 29', 85'; Holúbek 50'; Lobotka 71'; Vaško 78', 90' | Referee: Liška |

| 21 January 2012 Friendly | Karviná (Czech Republic) | 2–1 | AS Trenčín (Slovakia) | Luhačovice, Czech Republic |
| 10:30 CEST | Vladavić 51'; Ciku 85' | Report | Depetris 33' | Attendance: 50 |

| 25 January 2012 Friendly | AS Trenčín (Slovakia) | 2–1 | Slovácko (Czech Republic) | Trenčín |
| 14:00 CEST | Morong 57', 77' | Report | Kovář 49' | Stadium: Stadium na Sihoti; Attendance: 20; Referee: Ježík |

| 25 January 2012 Friendly | AS Trenčín (Slovakia) | 2–1 | Slovácko (Czech Republic) | Trenčín |
| 16:00 CEST | Depetris 4', 80' | Report | Došek 64' | Stadium: Stadium na Sihoti; Attendance: 50; Referee: Ježík |

| 28 January 2012 Friendly | AS Trenčín (Slovakia) | 3–0 | Šamorín (Slovakia) | Trenčín |
| 10:30 CEST | Ďuriška 38'; Godál 41'; Bezák 63' | Report | | Stadium: Stadium na Sihoti; Attendance: 30 |

| 28 January 2012 Friendly | AS Trenčín (Slovakia) | 3–3 | Opava (Czech Republic) | Trenčín |
| 13:00 CEST | Depetris 15', 77'; Hlohovský 84' | Report | Radzinevičius 33'; Cudrák 65'; Wirth 89' | Stadium: Stadium na Sihoti; Attendance: 50 |

| 3 February 2012 Friendly | Mattersburg (Austria) | 2–1 | AS Trenčín (Slovakia) | Austria |
| 15:00 CEST | Parlov 18' (pen.); Mörz 27' | Report | Hlohovský 38' |

| 12 February 2012 Friendly | Olomouc (Czech Republic) | 3–1 | AS Trenčín (Slovakia) | Czech Republic |
| 15:00 CEST | Podaný 7'; Schulmeister 13'; Ordoš 84' | Report | Salinas 54' |

| 18 February 2012 Friendly | Honvéd (Hungary) | 1–1 | AS Trenčín (Slovakia) | Hungary |
| 14:00 CEST | Czár 70' | Report | Depetris 71' | Attendance: 200 |

| 21 February 2012 Friendly | AS Trenčín (Slovakia) | 3–0 | Myjava (Slovakia) | Trenčín |
| 14:00 CEST | Díaz 27', 42'; Baéz 52' | Report | | Attendance: 50; Referee: Ježík |

| 25 February 2012 Friendly | AS Trenčín (Slovakia) | 4–2 | Žilina (Slovakia) | Trenčín |
| 11:00 CEST | Depetris 21'; Hlohovský 43'; Salinas 50'; Peltier 55' | Report | Ceesay 9'; Piaček 65' | Attendance: 20; Referee: Ježík |

| 25 February 2012 Friendly | AS Trenčín (Slovakia) | 0–0 | Žilina (Slovakia) | Trenčín |
| 13:30 CEST | | Report | | Attendance: 150; Referee: Jaška |

== Competition ==
=== Slovak First Football League ===
==== Matches ====
| 15 July 2011 1 | Slovan Bratislava | 3–1 | AS Trenčín | Bratislava |
| 20:00 | Milinković 4'; Ivana 16'; Šebo 30' | Summary | Depetris 28' | Stadium: Pasienky Stadium; Attendance: 2,048; Referee: (Slovakia) Dušan Sedlák |

| 23 July 2011 2 | AS Trenčín | 1–1 | Ružomberok | Trenčín |
| 17:30 | Kleščík 89' | Summary | Masaryk 72' | Stadium: Stadium na Sihoti; Attendance: 4,117; Referee: (Slovakia) Vladimír Vnuk |

| 31 July 2011 3 | Senica | 4–0 | AS Trenčín | Senica |
| 19:30 | Hošek 10', 81'; Wijlaars 60'; Piroska 85' (pen.) | Summary | | Stadium: Stadium FK Senica; Attendance: 2,211; Referee: (Slovakia) Richard Trutz |

| 6 August 2011 4 | AS Trenčín | 0–0 | Nitra | Trenčín |
| 17:30 | | Summary | | Stadium: Stadium na Sihoti; Attendance: 2,311; Referee: Kamil Horváth |

| 13 August 2011 5 | Žilina | 0–0 | AS Trenčín | Žilina |
| 19:30 | Ofori (red card) 89' | Summary | | Stadium: Stadium pod Dubňom; Attendance: 2,411; Referee: Michal Smolák |

| 20 August 2011 6 | AS Trenčín | 1–0 | Dunajská Streda | Trenčín |
| 17:30 | Mazan 85' | Summary | | Stadium: Stadium na Sihoti; Attendance: 2,601; Referee: Vladimír Hracho |

| 28 August 2011 7 | Trnava | 1–0 | AS Trenčín | Trnava |
| 19:00 | Karhan 36' (pen.) | Summary | | Stadium: Stadium Antona Malatinského; Attendance: 3,125; Referee: Mário Vlk |

| 10 September 2011 8 | AS Trenčín | 4–1 | Košice | Trenčín |
| 17:30 | Kleščík 19'; Dobias 50' (o.g.); Depetris 54'; Peltier 85' | Summary | Diaby 78' | Stadium: Stadium na Sihoti; Attendance: 2,215; Referee: Ján Valášek |

| 17 September 2011 9 | Banská Bystrica | 2–0 | AS Trenčín | Banská Bystrica |
| 18:15 | Hlinka 17'; Jakubko 33'; Hučko (yellow card) 59' (yellow-red card) 76' | Summary | | Stadium: SNP Stadium; Attendance: 1,380; Referee: Dušan Sedlák |

| 24 September 2011 10 | AS Trenčín | 4–0 | Tatran Prešov | Trenčín |
| 17:30 | Godál 4'; Štefánik 14'; Peltier 23', 42' | Summary | | Stadium: Stadium na Sihoti; Attendance: 1,812; Referee: Richard Trutz |

| 1 October 2011 11 | Zlaté Moravce | 3–0 | AS Trenčín | Zlaté Moravce |
| 17:30 | Babic 16'; Paur 29'; Pavlovič 82' | Summary | | Stadium: FC ViOn Stadium; Attendance: 1,744; Referee: Patrik Hrčka |

| 15 October 2011 12 | AS Trenčín | 2–2 | Slovan Bratislava | Trenčín |
| 17:30 | Peltier 12'; Holúbek 21' | Summary | Guédé 67'; Lačný 86'; Dobrotka (yellow card) 40' (yellow-red card) 87' | Stadium: Stadium na Sihoti; Attendance: 4,123; Referee: Ľubomír Samotný |

| 22 October 2011 13 | Ružomberok | 1–1 | AS Trenčín | Ružomberok |
| 14:30 | Masaryk 14' (pen.) | Summary | Godál 24'; Horváth (yellow card) 16' (yellow-red card) 69' | Stadium: Stadium pod Čebraťom; Attendance: 1,540; Referee: Vladimír Hracho |

| 29 October 2011 14 | AS Trenčín | 0–1 | Senica | Trenčín |
| 17:30 | Baéz (red card) 39' | Summary | Diviš (red card) 35'; Kalabiška 66'; Pedro Leal (yellow card) 64' (yellow-red card) 71' | Stadium: Stadium na Sihoti; Attendance: 2,089; Referee: Marcel Eperješi |

| 5 November 2011 15 | Nitra | 0–0 | AS Trenčín | Nitra |
| 14:30 | | Summary | | Stadium: Stadium pod Zoborom; Attendance: 1,350; Referee: Ivan Kružliak |

| 23 November 2011 16 | AS Trenčín | 3–3 | Žilina | Trenčín |
| 17:30 | Salinas 17'; Štefánik 43'; Ondráš 67' (o.g.) | Summary | Pich 51'; Pečovský 60'; Gergel 78' | Stadium: Stadium na Sihoti; Attendance: 1,310; Referee: Richard Trutz |

| 19 November 2011 17 | Dunajská Streda | 2–0 | AS Trenčín | Dunajská Streda |
| 17:30 | Čorić 54', 82' | Summary | Peltier (yellow card) 32' (yellow-red card) 43'; Baéz (red card) 61' | Stadium: DAC Stadium; Attendance: 1,007; Referee: Roman Matúš |

| 26 November 2011 18 | AS Trenčín | 4–2 | Trnava | Trenčín |
| 14:00 | Mazan 20'; Godál 50'; Salinas 61'; Horváth 69' | Summary | Čvirik 55'; Cypris 68' | Stadium: Stadium na Sihoti; Attendance: 3,419; Referee: Ján Valášek |

| 27 March 2012 19 | Košice | 1–2 | AS Trenčín | Košice |
| 17:30 | Diaby 43' | Summary | Štyvar 15'; Štefánik 89' | Stadium: Stadium Lokomotívy v Čermeli; Attendance: 850; Referee: Ján Valášek |

| 4 March 2012 20 | AS Trenčín | 2–2 | Banská Bystrica | Trenčín |
| 15:05 | Peltier 21', 55' | Summary | Hlinka 19'; Matúš 39' | Stadium: Stadium na Sihoti; Attendance: 2,223; Referee: Ivan Kružliak |

| 10 March 2012 21 | Tatran Prešov | 1–0 | AS Trenčín | Prešov |
| 14:30 | Katona 11' | Summary | | Stadium: Tatran Stadium; Attendance: 1,830; Referee: Vladimír Vnuk |

| 17 March 2012 22 | AS Trenčín | 3–1 | Zlaté Moravce | Trenčín |
| 17:30 | Depetris 22'; Mazan 74'; Peltier 87' | Summary | Hruška 54' | Stadium: Stadium na Sihoti; Attendance: 3,015; Referee: Jozef Pavlík |

| 24 March 2012 23 | Slovan Bratislava | 2–2 | AS Trenčín | Bratislava |
| 14:30 | Mészáros 39'; Smetana 76' | Summary | Hlohovský 43'; Depetris 87' | Stadium: Pasienky Stadium; Attendance: 2,215; Referee: Štefan Leško |

| 31 March 2012 24 | AS Trenčín | 2–1 | Ružomberok | Trenčín |
| 17:30 | Depetris 22'; Peltier 66' | Summary | Kostelný 18' | Stadium: Stadium na Sihoti; Attendance: 2,471; Referee: Dušan Sedlák |

| 3 April 2012 25 | Senica | 4–0 | AS Trenčín | Senica |
| 17:30 | Kóňa 25'; Blackburn 36'; Diviš 68'; Pavlík 90' | Summary | | Stadium: FK Senica Stadium; Attendance: 1,149; Referee: Vladimír Hracho |

| 7 April 2012 26 | AS Trenčín | 5–2 | Nitra | Trenčín |
| 17:30 | Depetris 48'; Peltier 54'; Štefánik 68'; Štyvar 87'; Mazan 90' | Summary | Soumah 3'; Gajdoš 59' | Stadium: Stadium na Sihoti; Attendance: 2,718; Referee: Michal Perašín |

| 14 April 2012 27 | Žilina | 2–2 | AS Trenčín | Žilina |
| 17:30 | Piaček 8'; Barčík 15' | Summary | Štefánik 14'; Peltier 74' | Stadium: Stadium pod Dubňom; Attendance: 3,036; Referee: Vladimír Vnuk |

| 21 April 2012 28 | AS Trenčín | 2–1 | Dunajská Streda | Trenčín |
| 17:30 | Hlohovský 25'; Peltier 53' | Summary | Huber 14' | Stadium: Stadium na Sihoti; Attendance: 3,021; Referee: Patrik Hrčka |

| 28 April 2012 29 | Trnava | 2–2 | AS Trenčín | Trnava |
| 17:30 | Mikovič 48'; Tomaček 81' | Summary | Hlohovský 22' (pen.), 58' | Stadium: Stadium Antona Malatinského; Attendance: 5,528; Referee: Jozef Pavlik |

| 5 May 2012 30 | AS Trenčín | 1–1 | Košice | Trenčín |
| 17:30 | Godál 87' | Summary | Viazanko 57' | Stadium: Stadium na Sihoti; Attendance: 2,617; Referee: Marek Mastiš |

| 12 May 2012 31 | Banská Bystrica | 1–2 | AS Trenčín | Banská Bystrica |
| 17:30 | Hučko 32' | Summary | Godál 56'; Mazan 90' | Stadium: SNP Stadium; Attendance: 1,020; Referee: Ladislav Prešinský |

| 16 May 2012 32 | AS Trenčín | 2–0 | Tatran Prešov | Trenčín |
| 17:30 | Depetris 8'; Hlohovský 40' | Summary | Štetina (red card) 22' | Stadium: Stadium na Sihoti; Attendance: 1,312; Referee: Filip Glova |

| 20 May 2012 33 | Zlaté Moravce | 2–3 | AS Trenčín | Zlaté Moravce |
| 17:30 | Orávik 14', 37' | Summary | Hlohovský 59'; Depetris 62'; Mazan 83' | Stadium: FC ViOn Stadium; Attendance: 526; Referee: Miroslav Fajčík |

| Pos | Team | Pld | W | D | L | GF | GA | GD | Pts | Qualification or relegation |
|---|---|---|---|---|---|---|---|---|---|---|
| 3 | Slovan Bratislava | 33 | 16 | 11 | 6 | 48 | 35 | +13 | 59 | Qualification for Europa League second qualifying round |
| 4 | Senica | 33 | 15 | 12 | 6 | 47 | 23 | +24 | 57 | Qualification for Europa League first qualifying round (Note: Since 2011–12 Slovak Cup winners Žilina qualified for the 2012–13 UEFA Champions League, so cup runners-up Senica qualified for the 2012–13 UEFA Europa League first qualifying round. Moreover, Slovan Bratislava were moved up a round as the cup winner spot was not used.) |
| 5 | Trenčín | 33 | 12 | 12 | 9 | 51 | 49 | +2 | 48 | |
| 6 | Ružomberok | 33 | 11 | 11 | 11 | 39 | 34 | +5 | 44 | |
| 7 | ViOn Zlaté Moravce | 33 | 11 | 8 | 14 | 34 | 43 | −9 | 41 | |

Source: Kicker (in German)
Rules for classification: 1) points; 2) goal difference; 3) number of goals scored.

=== Slovnaft Cup 11–12 ===
| 14 September 2011 Round of 32 | FC Petržalka 1898 | 0–3 | AS Trenčín | Bratislava |
| 16:30 | | Summary | Čögley 37'; Depetris 44'; Hlohovský 81' | Stadium: Rapid Stadium; Attendance: 360; Referee: Ladislav Prešinský |

| 28 September 2011 Round of 16 | AS Trenčín | 1–1 (a.e.t.) (2–4 p) | Slovan Bratislava | Trenčín |
| 16:30 | Jorge Salinas 61' | Summary | Halenár 76' | Stadium: Stadium na Sihoti; Attendance: 1,605; Referee: Ľubomír Samotný |
| | Penalties |
| | Hlohovský (penalty scored); Peltier (penalty missed); Depetris (penalty scored); Holúbek (penalty missed) | | Halenár (penalty missed); Žofčák (penalty scored); Kladrubský (penalty scored); Lačný (penalty scored); Táborský (penalty scored) |

== Player seasonal records ==
Competitive matches only. Updated to games played 20 May 2012.

=== Top scorers ===
| Rank | Name | League | Europe | Cup | Total |
|---|---|---|---|---|---|
| 1 | (Trinidad and Tobago) Lester Peltier | 11 | – | – | 11 |
| 2 | (Argentina) David Depetris | 8 | – | 1 | 9 |
| 3 | (Slovakia) Filip Hlohovský | 6 | – | 1 | 7 |
| 4 | (Slovakia) Peter Mazan | 6 | – | – | 6 |
| 5 | (Slovakia) Boris Godál | 5 | – | – | 5 |
| 5 | (Slovakia) Samuel Štefánik | 5 | – | – | 5 |
| 6 | (Paraguay) Jorge Salinas | 2 | – | 1 | 3 |
| 7 | (Slovakia) Peter Kleščík | 2 | – | – | 2 |
| 7 | (Slovakia) Peter Štyvar | 2 | – | – | 2 |
| 7 | Own goal | 2 | – | – | 2 |
| 8 | (Slovakia) Jakub Holúbek | 1 | – | – | 1 |
| 8 | (Slovakia) Vojtech Horváth | 1 | – | – | 1 |
| 8 | (Slovakia) Peter Čögley | – | – | 1 | 1 |
| | TOTALS | 51 | – | 4 | 55 |

Source: Competitive matches

=== Disciplinary record ===
Includes all competitive matches. Players with 1 card or more included only.

| Number | Position | Name | Slovak First League (Note: Two yellow cards resulting in a red are counted as a total of three cards – i.e. two yellow and one red card.) | | Europa League | | Slovak Cup | | Total | |
| Number | Position | Name | Yellow card | Red card | Yellow card | Red card | Yellow card | Red card | Yellow card | Red card |
|---|---|---|---|---|---|---|---|---|---|---|
| 1 | GK | (Slovakia) Miloš Volešák | 1 | 0 | 0 | 0 | 0 | 0 | 1 | 0 |
| 2 | DF | (Slovakia) Martin Ševela | 1 | 0 | 0 | 0 | 0 | 0 | 1 | 0 |
| 6 | FW | (Slovakia) Tomáš Malec | 1 | 0 | 0 | 0 | 0 | 0 | 1 | 0 |
| 8 | MF | (Argentina) Aldo Baéz | 5 | 2 | 0 | 0 | 1 | 0 | 6 | 2 |
| 9 | MF | (Paraguay) Jorge Salinas | 1 | 0 | 0 | 0 | 0 | 0 | 1 | 0 |
| 10 | FW | (Argentina) David Depetris | 1 | 0 | 0 | 0 | 0 | 0 | 1 | 0 |
| 11 | MF | (Slovakia) Vojtech Horváth | 1 | 1 | 0 | 0 | 0 | 0 | 1 | 1 |
| 13 | MF | (Slovakia) Filip Hlohovský | 2 | 0 | 0 | 0 | 0 | 0 | 2 | 0 |
| 15 | FW | (Slovakia) Peter Mazan | 4 | 0 | 0 | 0 | 0 | 0 | 4 | 0 |
| 17 | DF | (Slovakia) Peter Čögley | 3 | 0 | 0 | 0 | 1 | 0 | 4 | 0 |
| 19 | DF | (Slovakia) Peter Kleščík | 4 | 0 | 0 | 0 | 0 | 0 | 4 | 0 |
| 21 | DF | (Slovakia) Boris Godál | 3 | 0 | 0 | 0 | 0 | 0 | 3 | 0 |
| 22 | FW | (Trinidad and Tobago) Lester Peltier | 5 | 1 | 0 | 0 | 0 | 0 | 5 | 1 |
| 26 | MF | (Slovakia) Samuel Štefánik | 3 | 0 | 0 | 0 | 0 | 0 | 3 | 0 |
| | | TOTALS | 35 | 4 | 0 | 0 | 2 | 0 | 37 | 4 |

Sources: soccerway.com, UEFA.com
