= 2016–17 Slovak First Football League =

Fortuna Liga
- Season: 2016–17
- Dates: 16 July 2016 – 27 May 2017
- Champions: Žilina
- Relegated: Spartak Myjava (withdrew)
- Champions League: Žilina
- Europa League: ŠK Slovan Bratislava; MFK Ružomberok; AS Trenčín
- Matches: 165
- Goals: 455 (2.76 per match)
- Top goalscorer: Filip Hlohovský; Seydouba Soumah (20 goals)
- Biggest home win: Žilina 7–0 Spartak Trnava (6 November 2016)
- Biggest away win: DAC Dunajská Streda 0–6 Žilina (15 October 2016)
- Highest scoring: Žilina 7–1 Zemplín Michalovce (11 December 2016)
- Highest attendance: 7,637 (Sp.Trnava–Slovan)
- Lowest attendance: 150 (Michalovce-Ružomberok)
- Average attendance: 1,974

The 2016–17 Slovak First Football League (known as the Slovak Fortuna Liga for sponsorship reasons) was the 24th season of first-tier football league in Slovakia, since its establishment in 1993. AS Trenčín were the defending champions, after winning their 2nd Slovak championship in the previous season. The fixtures were announced on 5 July 2016. The season began on 16 July 2016 and finished on 27 May 2017.

== Teams ==
A total of 12 teams competed in the league, including 11 sides from the 2015–16 season and one that was promoted from the 2. liga.

Relegation for MFK Skalica to the 2016–17 DOXXbet liga was confirmed on 21 May 2016. The relegated team was replaced by DOXXbet liga champion 1. FC Tatran Prešov.

2016–17 Teams

- AS Trenčín
- ŠK Slovan Bratislava
- Spartak Myjava
- FC Spartak Trnava
- MŠK Žilina
- MFK Ružomberok
- FC DAC 1904 Dunajská Streda
- ŽP Šport Podbrezová
- FC ViOn Zlaté Moravce
- FK Senica
- MFK Zemplín Michalovce
- 1. FC Tatran Prešov

=== Stadiums and locations ===
Location of teams in Fortuna Liga 2016–17

Team	Home city	Stadium	Capacity	2015–16 season
AS Trenčín	Trenčín	Štadión na Sihoti	3,500	Champions
DAC Dunajská Streda	Dunajská Streda	DAC Aréna^{1}	6,839	7th in Fortuna Liga
FO ŽP Šport Podbrezová	Podbrezová	ZELPO Aréna	4,061	8th in Fortuna Liga
FK Senica	Senica	OMS Arena	5,070	10th in Fortuna Liga
Michalovce	Michalovce	Mestský futbalový štadión^{3,4}	4,440	11th in Fortuna Liga
MFK Ružomberok	Ružomberok	Štadión pod Čebraťom	4,817	6th in Fortuna Liga
1. FC Tatran Prešov	Prešov	Tatran Stadium^{2}	5,410	2. Liga Champion
MŠK Žilina	Žilina	Štadión pod Dubňom	11,258	5th in Fortuna Liga
Slovan Bratislava	Bratislava	Pasienky	12,000	2nd in Fortuna Liga
Spartak Myjava	Myjava	Stadium Myjava	2,709	3rd in Fortuna Liga
Spartak Trnava	Trnava	Štadión Antona Malatinského	19,200	4th in Fortuna Liga
ViOn Zlaté Moravce	Zlaté Moravce	Štadión FC ViOn	4,000	9th in Fortuna Liga

^{1}Some matches were played at NTC Senec in Senec while DAC Aréna was under renovation.
^{2}Some matches are played at NTC Poprad in Poprad while Tatran Stadium is under renovation.
^{3}Some matches were played at NTC Poprad in Poprad while Mestský futbalový štadión is under renovation.
^{4}Some matches are played at Štadión pod Dubňom in Žilina while Mestský futbalový štadión is under renovation.

AS Trenčín	Dunajská Streda	Podbrezová	Michalovce
Štadión na Sihoti	DAC Aréna	ZELPO Aréna	Mestský futbalový štadión
Capacity: 3,500	Capacity: 6,839	Capacity: 4,061	Capacity: 4,440
FK Senica	MFK Ružomberok	MŠK Žilina	Slovan Bratislava
OMS Arena; UEFA Stadium	Štadión pod Čebraťom UEFA Stadium	Štadión pod Dubňom; UEFA Stadium	Pasienky
Capacity: 5,070	Capacity: 4,817	Capacity: 11,258	Capacity: 12,000
Spartak Myjava	Spartak Trnava	Tatran Prešov	Zlaté Moravce
Stadium Myjava	ŠAM - City Arena; UEFA Stadium	Tatran Stadium	Štadión FC ViOn
Capacity: 2,709	Capacity: 19,200	Capacity: 5,410	Capacity: 4,000

== Personnel and kits ==
Team	President	Manager	Captain	Kitmaker	Shirt sponsor
AS Trenčín	(Netherlands) Tscheu La Ling	(Slovakia) Martin Ševela	(Slovakia) Peter Kleščík	Adidas	AEGON
DAC Dunajská Streda	(Slovakia) Oszkár Világi	(Romania) Csaba László	(Croatia) Marin Ljubičić	Adidas	Kukkonia
FO ŽP Šport Podbrezová	(Slovakia) Július Kriváň	(Slovakia) Karol Praženica	(Slovakia) Jaroslav Kostelný	Adidas	Železiarne Podbrezová
FK Senica	(Slovakia) Vladimír Levársky	(Slovakia) Miroslav Mentel	(Slovakia) Michal Šulla	hummel	Business Funding Solutions
MFK Ružomberok	(Slovakia) Milan Fiľo	(Slovakia) Norbert Hrnčár	(Slovakia) Marek Sapara	Adidas	MAESTRO
MŠK Žilina	(Slovakia) Jozef Antošík	(Slovakia) Adrián Guľa	(Slovakia) Viktor Pečovský	Nike	Preto
Slovan Bratislava	(Slovakia) Ivan Kmotrík	(Serbia) Ivan Vukomanović	(Serbia) Boris Sekulić	Adidas	niké
Spartak Myjava	(Slovakia) Pavel Halabrín	(Slovakia) Mikuláš Radványi	(Slovakia) Štefan Pekár	Uhlsport	NAD RESS
Spartak Trnava	(Slovakia) Dušan Keketi	(Slovakia) Miroslav Karhan	(Slovakia) Lukáš Greššák	Adidas	ŽOS Trnava, ŠKODA
ViOn Zlaté Moravce	(Slovakia) Karol Škula	(Slovakia) Juraj Jarábek	(Slovakia) Peter Orávik	Erreà	ViOn
MFK Michalovce	(Slovakia) Ján Sabol	(Slovakia) Anton Šoltis	(Slovakia) Tomáš Sedlák	Adidas	Scorp
1. FC Tatran Prešov	(Slovakia) Miroslav Remeta	(Slovakia) Miroslav Jantek	(Slovakia) Jozef Talian	ATAK Sportswear	Dúha

=== Managerial changes ===
Team	Outgoing manager	Manner of departure	Date of vacancy	Position in table	Replaced by	Date of appointment
MFK Zemplín Michalovce	(Slovakia) Stanislav Griga	End of contract	21 May 2016	Pre-season	(Slovakia) Anton Šoltis	7 June 2016
FC DAC 1904 Dunajská Streda	(Croatia) Tomislav Marić	End of contract	30 May 2016	Pre-season	(Slovakia) Krisztián Németh	23 May 2016
Zlaté Moravce	(Slovakia) Libor Fašiang	Sacked	23 June 2016	Pre-season	(Slovakia) Peter Gergely	23 May 2016
Spartak Myjava	(Slovakia) Norbert Hrnčár	Signed by MFK Ružomberok	30 May 2016	Pre-season	(Slovakia) Mikuláš Radványi	9 June 2016
MFK Ružomberok	(Slovakia) Ladislav Pecko	End of contract	30 May 2016	Pre-season	(Slovakia) Norbert Hrnčár	3 June 2016
FK Senica	(Slovakia) Juraj Sabol	Sacked	30 May 2016	Pre-season	(Czech Republic) Aleš Čvančara	30 May 2016
FK Senica	(Czech Republic) Aleš Čvančara	Terminated by own request	13 July 2016	9-12	(Slovakia) Miroslav Mentel	31 July 2016
ŠK Slovan Bratislava	(Cyprus) Nikodimos Papavasiliou	Sacked	31 July 2016	2	(Slovakia) Vladimír Koník (carateker)	31 July 2016
ŠK Slovan Bratislava	(Slovakia) Vladimír Koník	End of caretaker spell	18 August 2016	5	(Serbia) Ivan Vukomanović	18 August 2016
1. FC Tatran Prešov	(Slovakia) Stanislav Varga	Sacked	14 October 2016	12	(Slovakia) Ján Karaffa (carateker)	14 October 2016
FC DAC 1904 Dunajská Streda	(Slovakia) Krisztián Németh	Sacked	20 October 2016	11	(Romania) Csaba László	20 October 2016
1. FC Tatran Prešov	(Slovakia) Ján Karaffa	End of caretaker spell	2 November 2016	11	(Slovakia) Miroslav Jantek	2 November 2016
Zlaté Moravce	(Slovakia) Peter Gergely	Sacked	6 November 2016	12	(Slovakia) Juraj Jarábek	6 November 2016
FO ŽP Šport Podbrezová	(Slovakia) Marek Fabula	Sacked	25 April 2017	3	(Slovakia) Karol Praženica	25 April 2017

== League table ==
Pos	Team	Pld	W	D	L	GF	GA	GD	Pts	Qualification or relegation
1	Žilina (C)	30	23	4	3	82	25	+57	73	Qualification for the Champions League second qualifying round
2	Slovan Bratislava	30	18	3	9	54	34	+20	57	Qualification for the Europa League first qualifying round (Note: Since the winners of the 2016–17 Slovak Cup, Slovan Bratislava, qualified for European competition based on league position, the spot awarded to the cup winners (Europa League first qualifying round) was passed to the fourth-placed team.)
3	Ružomberok	30	15	7	8	55	38	+17	52	Qualification for the Europa League first qualifying round
4	Trenčín	30	14	5	11	53	48	+5	47	Qualification for the Europa League first qualifying round
5	Podbrezová	30	12	9	9	34	31	+3	45	
6	Spartak Trnava	30	12	7	11	34	37	−3	43	
7	DAC Dunajská Streda	30	10	12	8	37	34	+3	42	
8	Zemplín Michalovce	30	8	5	17	35	55	−20	29	
9	Senica	30	7	7	16	25	35	−10	28	
10	ViOn Zlaté Moravce	30	5	7	18	29	55	−26	22	
11	Tatran Prešov	30	3	10	17	17	63	−46	19	
12	Spartak Myjava (D, R)	0	0	0	0	0	0	0	0	Withdrawal to 4. Liga for the 2017–18 season (Note: Spartak Myjava withdrew from the league on 21 December 2016, and their results were expunged.)

Source: Niké liga (in Slovak)
Rules for classification: 1) Points; 2) Head-to-head points; 3) Head-to-head goal difference; 4) Head-to-head away goals scored; 5) Play-off.
(C) Champions; (D) Disqualified; (R) Relegated

== Results ==
Home \ Away	TRČ	DAC	POD	SEN	ZPM	RUŽ	ŽIL	SLO	TRV	TAT	ZTM	TRČ	DAC	POD	SEN	ZPM	RUŽ	ŽIL	SLO	TRV	TAT	ZTM
Trenčín	—	0–1	0–1	3–0	4–1	3–1	2–1	2–1	3–3	1–1	2–0	—	—	2–0	1–1	—	2–1	—	3–2	3–4	4–0	—
DAC Dunajská Streda	2–3	—	0–0	0–0	2–1	1–1	0–6	1–0	0–0	5–0	1–0	2–0	—	2–2	1–0	—	—	2–2	—	—	—	—
Podbrezová	2–1	0–0	—	2–0	1–0	3–1	2–2	2–0	1–1	1–1	1–1	—	—	—	—	1–4	0–1	—	2–3	0–1	—	2–0
Senica	1–2	1–1	0–1	—	2–0	1–1	2–0	0–1	0–1	0–0	1–3	—	—	1–1	—	1–0	1–2	—	0–1	1–0	—	—
Zemplín Michalovce	2–1	1–0	1–3	0–0	—	1–3	0–2	1–3	2–0	2–2	0–0	2–0	1–2	—	—	—	—	0–1	—	—	—	5–1
Ružomberok	3–3	2–2	0–0	2–1	4–0	—	0–2	3–2	1–1	1–0	6–1	—	2–0	—	—	3–1	—	—	2–1	1–0	5–0	2–1
Žilina	4–0	2–2	1–0	4–2	7–1	3–2	—	2–1	7–0	4–0	4–1	3–0	—	4–0	3–2	—	3–1	—	—	—	3–0	—
Slovan Bratislava	4–3	3–2	2–0	2–0	3–1	2–1	1–0	—	0–1	1–1	3–2	—	1–0	—	—	3–1	—	0–1	—	—	3–1	1–1
Spartak Trnava	1–1	2–1	0–2	0–1	2–3	0–1	1–2	0–0	—	2–0	1–0	—	1–0	—	—	1–0	—	1–2	0–3	—	4–0	3–1
Tatran Prešov	1–2	0–3	0–2	0–4	0–0	2–1	1–1	0–2	1–3	—	1–0	—	1–1	0–2	1–0	2–2	—	—	—	—	—	1–1
ViOn Zlaté Moravce	3–0	1–1	2–0	0–1	1–2	1–1	0–2	1–5	0–0	3–0	—	0–2	1–2	—	2–1	—	—	1–4	—	—	—	—

Source: Niké liga (in Slovak)
Legend: Blue = home team win; Yellow = draw; Red = away team win.
For upcoming matches, an "a" indicates there is an article about the rivalry between the two participants.

== Season statistics ==
=== Top goalscorers ===
Updated through matches played on 27 May 2017.

Rank	Player	Club	Goals
1	(Slovakia) Filip Hlohovský	MŠK Žilina	20
1	(Guinea) Seydouba Soumah	Slovan Bratislava	20
3	(Curaçao) Rangelo Janga	AS Trenčín	14
3	(Slovakia) Michal Škvarka	MŠK Žilina	14
3	(Czech Republic) Jakub Mareš	MFK Ružomberok	14
6	(Hungary) Tamás Priskin	Slovan Bratislava	10
6	(Slovakia) Pavol Šafranko	Prešov (4)/DAC (6)	10
8	(Slovakia) Nikolas Špalek	MŠK Žilina	9
9	(Nigeria) Yusuf Otubanjo	MŠK Žilina	8
9	(Slovakia) Erik Pačinda	DAC D.Streda	8

=== Hat-tricks ===
Round	Player	For	Against	Result	Date	Ref
21	(Hungary) Tamás Priskin	Slovan Bratislava	AS Trenčín	4–3	25 February 2017	
30	(Slovakia) Erik Jirka	Spartak Trnava	AS Trenčín	4–3	7 May 2017	

=== Clean sheets ===
Updated through matches played on 27 May 2017

Rank	Player	Club	Clean sheets
1	(Slovakia) Martin Kuciak	Podbrezová	14
2	(Slovakia) Adam Jakubech	Spartak Trnava	13
3	(Slovakia) Miloš Volešák	MŠK Žilina	12
4	(Slovakia) Michal Šulla	FK Senica	8
4	(Slovakia) Matej Slávik	DAC D.Streda	8
6	(Slovakia) Ján Mucha	Slovan Bratislava	7
6	(Slovakia) Matúš Macík	MFK Ružomberok	7
8	(Slovakia) Matúš Hruška	Spartak Myjava	6
9	(Czech Republic) Patrik Macej	Michalovce	5
10	(Slovakia) Pavel Kováč	Zlaté Moravce	4
10	(Slovakia) Jozef Talian	Tatran Prešov	4
10	(Slovakia) Igor Šemrinec	AS Trenčín	4

=== Discipline ===
As of matches played on 20 May 2017.

==== Player ====
- Most yellow cards: 11
  - (Slovakia) Miroslav Petko (Tatran Prešov)
  - (Croatia) Marin Ljubičić (DAC D.Streda)
  - (Slovakia) Erik Streňo (Tatran Prešov)
- Most red cards: 1
  - 25 players

== Awards ==
=== Player of the Month ===
Month	Player	Club	Ref
July	(Slovakia) Martin Chrien	MFK Ružomberok	
August	(Slovakia) Nikolas Špalek	MŠK Žilina	
September	(Slovakia) Ľuboš Kolár	Spartak Myjava	
October	(Slovakia) Martin Kuciak	Podbrezová	
Nov/Dec	(Slovakia) Filip Hlohovský	MŠK Žilina	
Feb/March	(Hungary) Tamás Priskin	Slovan Bratislava	
April	(Panama) Erick Davis	Dunajská Streda	

=== Top Eleven ===
- Goalkeeper: (Slovakia) Adam Jakubech (Spartak Trnava)
- Defence: (Cameroon) Ernest Mabouka (MŠK Žilina), (Slovakia) Kornel Saláta (Slovan Bratislava), (Slovakia) Denis Vavro (MŠK Žilina), (Slovakia) Jakub Holúbek (AS Trenčín/MŠK Žilina)
- Midfield: (Slovakia) Michal Škvarka (MŠK Žilina), (Croatia) Marin Ljubičić (D.Streda), (Slovakia) Nikolas Špalek (MŠK Žilina), (Guinea) Seydouba Soumah (Slovan Bratislava), (Slovakia) Filip Hlohovský (MŠK Žilina)
- Attack: (Czech Republic) Jakub Mareš (MFK Ružomberok)

=== Individual awards ===
Manager of the season

Adrián Guľa (MŠK Žilina)

Player of the Year

Filip Hlohovský (MŠK Žilina)

Young player of the Year

Pavol Šafranko (Podbrezová/D.Streda)

== Attendances ==
#	Club	Average
1	DAC	4,112
2	Trnava	3,135
3	Žilina	2,909
4	Trenčín	2,277
5	Zemplín	1,942
6	Ružomberok	1,728
7	Železiarne	1,595
8	Myjava	1,347
9	ViOn	1,214
10	Tatran	1,188
11	Senica	1,034
12	Slovan	925

== See also ==
- 2016–17 Slovak Cup
- 2016–17 2. Liga (Slovakia)
- List of transfers summer 2016
- List of transfers winter 2016-17
- List of foreign players
