= 2015–16 Slovak First Football League =

Fortuna Liga
- Season: 2015–16
- Dates: 18 July 2015 – 20 May 2016
- Champions: Trenčín
- Relegated: Skalica
- Champions League: Trenčín
- Europa League: Slovan Bratislava; Spartak Myjava; Spartak Trnava
- Matches: 198
- Goals: 524 (2.65 per match)
- Top goalscorer: Gino van Kessel (17 goals)
- Biggest home win: Žilina 6–0 ViOn Zlaté Moravce (18 March 2016)
- Biggest away win: Slovan Bratislava 0–4 Trenčín (8 May 2016)
- Highest scoring: Podbrezová 6–2 Michalovce (1 August 2015); Trenčín 5–3 Spartak Trnava (13 September 2015)
- Highest attendance: 15,101 (Sp.Trnava–Slovan)
- Lowest attendance: 0 (Trenčín-Podbrezová)
- Average attendance: ▲2413
- All statistics correct as of 23 June 2015.

The 2015–16 Slovak First Football League (known as the Slovak Fortuna Liga for sponsorship reasons) was the 23rd season of the first-tier football league in Slovakia since its establishment in 1993. AS Trenčín were the defending champions, after winning their 1st Slovak championship.

== Teams ==
A total of 12 teams competed in the league, including 10 sides from the 2014–15 season and two who were promoted from the 2. liga.

Relegation for MFK Košice and FK Dukla Banská Bystrica to the 2015–16 DOXXbet liga was confirmed on 30 May 2015. These two relegated teams were replaced by 2. liga champion MFK Zemplín Michalovce and 2. liga runner-up MFK Skalica. Both teams made their debut at the highest level. Despite that MFK Košice finished as 6th, they did not obtain a licence for the 2015–16 season.

Location of teams in Fortuna Liga 2015–16

=== Stadiums and locations ===
Team	Home city	Stadium	Capacity	2014–15 season
AS Trenčín	Trenčín	Štadión na Sihoti	3,500	Champions
DAC Dunajská Streda	Dunajská Streda	Mestský štadión	16,410	8th in Fortuna Liga
FO ŽP Šport Podbrezová	Podbrezová	ZELPO Aréna (Note: Some matches were played at Mestský štadión Brezno in Brezno while ZELPO Aréna had been under renovation.)	4,061	11th in Fortuna Liga
FK Senica	Senica	OMS Arena	5,070	5th in Fortuna Liga
Michalovce	Michalovce	Mestský futbalový štadión	4,440	2. Liga Champions
MFK Ružomberok	Ružomberok	Štadión pod Čebraťom (Note: Some matches were played at NTC Poprad in Poprad while Štadión MFK Ružomberok had been under renovation.)	4,817	7th in Fortuna Liga
MFK Skalica	Skalica	Mestský štadión Skalica (Note: Some matches were played at OMS Arena in Senica while Mestský štadión Skalica had been under renovation.)	3,000	2nd in 2. Liga
MŠK Žilina	Žilina	Štadión pod Dubňom	11,181	2nd in Fortuna Liga
Slovan Bratislava	Bratislava	Pasienky	12,000	3rd in Fortuna Liga
Spartak Myjava	Myjava	Stadium Myjava	2,709	9th in Fortuna Liga
Spartak Trnava	Trnava	Stadium Antona Malatinského	19,200	4th in Fortuna Liga
ViOn Zlaté Moravce	Zlaté Moravce	FC ViOn Stadium	4,000	10th in Fortuna Liga

== Personnel and kits ==
Team	President	Manager	Captain	Kitmaker	Shirt sponsor
AS Trenčín	(Netherlands) Tscheu La Ling	(Slovakia) Martin Ševela	(Slovakia) Peter Kleščík	Adidas	AEGON
DAC Dunajská Streda	(Slovakia) Oszkár Világi	(Croatia) Tomislav Marić	(Slovakia) Ľubomír Michalík	Adidas	Kukkonia
FO ŽP Šport Podbrezová	(Slovakia) Július Kriváň	(Slovakia) Marek Fabuľa	(Slovakia) Jaroslav Kostelný	Adidas	Železiarne Podbrezová
FK Senica	(Slovakia) Vladimír Levársky	(Slovakia) Juraj Sabol	(Czech Republic) Petr Pavlík	hummel	Business Funding Solutions
MFK Ružomberok	(Slovakia) Milan Fiľo	(Slovakia) Ladislav Pecko	(Slovakia) Marek Sapara	Adidas	MAESTRO
MŠK Žilina	(Slovakia) Jozef Antošík	(Slovakia) Adrián Guľa	(Slovakia) Viktor Pečovský	Nike	Preto
Slovan Bratislava	(Slovakia) Ivan Kmotrík	(Cyprus) Nikodimos Papavasiliou	(Serbia) Marko Milinković	Adidas	niké
Spartak Myjava	(Slovakia) Pavel Halabrín	(Slovakia) Norbert Hrnčár	(Slovakia) Štefan Pekár	Uhlsport	NAD RESS
Spartak Trnava	(Slovakia) Michal Pethö	(Slovakia) Miroslav Karhan	(Slovakia) Martin Mikovič	Adidas	ŽOS Trnava, ŠKODA
ViOn Zlaté Moravce	(Slovakia) Karol Škula	(Slovakia) Libor Fašiang	(Slovakia) Pavel Kováč	Erreà	ViOn
MFK Michalovce	(Slovakia) Igor Šoltinský	(Slovakia) Stanislav Griga	(Slovakia) Marián Kelemen	Adidas	Scorp
MFK Skalica	(Slovakia) Peter Bartoš	(Slovakia) Štefan Horný	(Slovakia) Pavol Majerník	Nike	

=== Managerial changes ===
Team	Outgoing manager	Manner of departure	Date of vacancy	Position in table	Replaced by	Date of appointment
Spartak Myjava	(Slovakia) Peter Gergely	Sacked	30 May 2015	Pre-season	(Slovakia) Norbert Hrnčár	2 June 2015
FO ŽP Šport Podbrezová	(Slovakia) Branislav Benko	End of caretaker spell	30 May 2015	Pre-season	(Slovakia) Zdenko Frťala	15 June 2015
FC ViOn Zlaté Moravce	(Slovakia) Branislav Mráz	signed by FC Spartak Trnava	16 June 2015	Pre-season	(North Macedonia) Milko Gjurovski	15 June 2015
MFK Skalica	(Slovakia) Štefan Horný	End of contract	30 June 2015	Pre-season	(Czech Republic) Aleš Křeček	3 July 2015
ŠK Slovan Bratislava	(Slovakia) Dušan Tittel	Resigned	21 August 2015	4th	(Cyprus) Nikodimos Papavasiliou	21 August 2015
FC ViOn Zlaté Moravce	(North Macedonia) Milko Gjurovski	Sacked	23 August 2015	11th	(Slovakia) Libor Fašiang	27 August 2015
FC Spartak Trnava	(Slovakia) Juraj Jarábek	Resigned	28 August 2015	9th	(Slovakia) Branislav Mráz	28 August 2015
MFK Ružomberok	(Slovakia) Ivan Galád	Sacked	2 September 2015	10th	(Slovakia) Ladislav Pecko	11 September 2015
FC Spartak Trnava	(Slovakia) Branislav Mráz	End of interim contract	2 September 2015	6th	(Slovakia) Ivan Hucko	2 September 2015
FK Senica	(Slovakia) Eduard Pagáč	Sacked	8 September 2015	8th	(Slovakia) Juraj Sabol	8 September 2015
Podbrezová	(Slovakia) Zdenko Frťala	Sacked	21 September 2015	12th	(Slovakia) Marek Fabuľa	21 September 2015
MFK Skalica	(Czech Republic) Aleš Křeček	Sacked	28 October 2015	11th	(Slovakia) Štefan Horný	28 October 2015
Zemplín Michalovce	(Czech Republic) František Šturma	Sacked	30 December 2015	10th	(Slovakia) Stanislav Griga	30 December 2015
FC Spartak Trnava	(Slovakia) Ivan Hucko	Resigned	21 April 2015	5th	(Slovakia) Miroslav Karhan	21 April 2015

== League table ==
Pos	Team	Pld	W	D	L	GF	GA	GD	Pts	Qualification or relegation
1	Trenčín (C)	33	26	3	4	73	28	+45	81	Qualification for the Champions League second qualifying round (Note: Trenčín qualified for the Europa League first qualifying round by winning the 2015–16 Slovak Cup. However, since they already qualified for European competition based on their league position, the spot awarded to the cup winners was passed down the league.)
2	Slovan Bratislava	33	20	9	4	50	25	+25	69	Qualification for the Europa League first qualifying round
3	Spartak Myjava	33	18	6	9	41	33	+8	60	Qualification for the Europa League first qualifying round
4	Spartak Trnava	33	16	6	11	49	41	+8	54	Qualification for the Europa League first qualifying round
5	Žilina	33	14	6	13	58	46	+12	48	
6	Ružomberok	33	12	9	12	42	41	+1	45	
7	DAC Dunajská Streda	33	12	7	14	38	42	−4	43	
8	Podbrezová	33	10	7	16	43	46	−3	37	
9	ViOn Zlaté Moravce	33	7	10	16	38	57	−19	31	
10	Senica	33	7	9	17	30	48	−18	30	
11	Zemplín Michalovce	33	7	8	18	32	55	−23	29	
12	Skalica (R)	33	6	6	21	30	62	−32	24	Relegation to 2. Liga

Source: Niké liga (in Slovak)
Rules for classification: 1) Points; 2) Head-to-head points; 3) Head-to-head goal difference; 4) Head-to-head away goals scored; 5) Play-off.
(C) Champions; (R) Relegated

== Results ==
Home \ Away	TRE	DAC	POD	SEN	ZMI	RUŽ	SKA	ŽIL	SLO	MYJ	TRN	ZLM	TRE	DAC	POD	SEN	ZMI	RUŽ	SKA	ŽIL	SLO	MYJ	TRN	ZLM
Trenčín		4–1	2–1	2–0	2–0	1–1	3–0	1–4	0–2	4–1	5–3	4–1			2–0			1–0	2–1	5–2		3–1	1–3	
DAC Dunajská Streda	0–2		5–1	2–0	3–1	1–1	1–0	1–0	1–1	0–1	2–1	2–0	1–0		1–0	3–1					0–2	1–1		
Podbrezová	0–2	0–0		1–0	6–2	0–1	3–0	2–3	0–1	1–2	0–2	2–2					2–0	3–1		2–0		2–0	3–0	
Senica	1–4	2–3	3–1		1–1	1–1	2–1	2–0	1–1	0–1	0–0	1–1	0–2		0–1			0–1	2–2		1–3	1–1		
Zemplín Michalovce	0–1	0–3	2–0	1–3		1–3	3–1	3–0	1–2	1–2	0–1	2–1	1–3	1–1		2–1					1–1			1–1
Ružomberok	0–3	1–0	3–2	0–1	2–2		1–3	2–2	1–1	1–0	0–0	5–2		3–0			0–0		3–1	0–2			3–1	1–1
Skalica	1–2	2–2	0–0	0–3	1–0	0–1		1–0	0–2	0–0	2–3	2–3		2–1	2–1		0–0					1–2		1–0
Žilina	2–3	1–1	1–3	4–1	2–0	2–0	2–2		3–0	3–0	2–0	5–1		4–1		0–0	2–3		1–0		0–0			6–0
Slovan Bratislava	0–0	1–0	3–1	2–1	1–0	2–1	4–1	2–1		0–1	2–0	2–0	0–4		2–2			3–1	2–0			0–1	4–1	
Spartak Myjava	0–1	3–0	2–1	0–0	2–1	2–1	3–0	1–4	0–2		4–2	0–0					3–0	1–0		0–0			1–0	1–0
Spartak Trnava	1–1	2–0	0–0	0–1	0–1	2–1	2–1	2–0	0–0	2–1		2–1		1–0		2–0	3–0		5–1	3–0				3–2
ViOn Zlaté Moravce	0–1	2–1	2–2	3–0	1–1	0–2	3–1	4–0	1–2	1–3	2–2		0–2	1–0	0–0	2–0					0–0			

Source: Niké liga (in Slovak)
Legend: Blue = home team win; Yellow = draw; Red = away team win.

== Season statistics ==
=== Top goalscorers ===
Updated through matches played on 20 May 2016.

Rank	Player	Club	Goals
1	(Curaçao) Gino van Kessel	AS Trenčín	17
2	(Slovakia) Matúš Bero	AS Trenčín	15
2	(Slovakia) David Depetris	Spartak Trnava	15
4	(Hungary) Tamás Priskin	Slovan Bratislava	12
5	(Slovakia) Peter Sládek	Spartak Myjava	11
5	(Cameroon) Leandre Tawamba	ViOn Zlaté Moravce	11
7	(Slovakia) Róbert Vittek	Slovan Bratislava	10
7	(Slovakia) Erik Pačinda	DAC Dunajská Streda	10
7	(Slovakia) Miloš Lačný	MFK Ružomberok	10
10	(Brazil) Marques De Souza	Zlaté Moravce	9
10	(Slovakia) Ákos Szarka	DAC Dunajska Streda	9

=== Hat-tricks ===
Round	Player	For	Against	Result	Date	Ref
7	(Slovakia) Ákos Szarka^{4}	DAC D.Streda	Podbrezová	5–1	29 August 2015	
11	(Slovakia) Matúš Bero	AS Trenčín	MFK Skalica	3–0	26 September 2015	
17	(Cameroon) Leandre Tawamba	Zlaté Moravce	MFK Skalica	3–1	21 November 2015	
24	(Slovakia) Filip Hlohovský	MŠK Žilina	Zlaté Moravce	6–0	18 March 2016	
27	(Slovakia) David Depetris	Spartak Trnava	MFK Skalica	5–1	16 April 2016	
32	(Curaçao) Gino van Kessel^{4}	AS Trenčín	MŠK Žilina	5–2	13 May 2016	

Note

^{4} Player scored 4 goals

=== Clean sheets ===
Updated through matches played on 20 May 2016

Rank	Player	Club	Clean sheets
1	(Slovakia) Igor Šemrinec	AS Trenčin	15
2	(Slovakia) Ján Mucha	Slovan Bratislava	14
3	(Slovakia) Miloš Volešák	MŠK Žilina	11
3	(Slovakia) Martin Kuciak	FO ZP Sport Podbrezová	11
3	(Slovakia) Matúš Hruška	Spartak Myjava	11
6	(Slovakia) Tomáš Tujvel	DAC Dunajská Streda	8
7	(Slovakia) Michal Šulla	FK Senica	7
7	(North Macedonia) Darko Tofiloski	MFK Ružomberok	7
9	(Slovakia) Ľuboš Kamenár	Spartak Trnava	6
9	(Slovakia) Adam Jakubech	Spartak Trnava	6
9	(Slovakia) Marián Kelemen	Zemplin Michalovce	6

=== Discipline ===
As of matches played on 20 May 2016.

==== Player ====
- Most yellow cards: 12
  - (Croatia) Marin Ljubičić (DAC Dunajska Streda)
- Most red cards: 3
  - (Slovakia) Ján Maslo (MFK Ružomberok)

==== Club ====
- Most yellow cards: 95
  - FC Spartak Trnava
- Most red cards: 8
  - MFK Ružomberok

== Awards ==
=== Player of the Month ===
Month	Player	Club	Ref
August	(Slovakia) Ákos Szarka	DAC D.Streda	
September	(Slovakia) Matúš Bero	AS Trenčín	
October	(Cameroon) Léandre Tawamba	Zlaté Moravce	
November	(Curaçao) Gino van Kessel	AS Trenčín	
March	(Slovakia) Miloš Lačný	MFK Ružomberok	
April	(Netherlands) Ryan Koolwijk	AS Trenčín	
May	(Curaçao) Gino van Kessel	AS Trenčín	

=== Top Eleven ===
- Goalkeeper: (Slovakia) Ján Mucha (Slovan Bratislava)
- Defence: (Slovakia) Martin Šulek (AS Trenčín), (Slovakia) Kornel Saláta (Slovan Bratislava), (Slovakia) Milan Škriniar (MŠK Žilina), (Nigeria) Kingsley Madu (AS Trenčín)
- Midfield: (Slovakia) Viktor Pečovský (MŠK Žilina), (Nigeria) Ibrahim Rabiu (AS Trenčín), (Curaçao) Gino van Kessel (AS Trenčín), (Slovakia) Matúš Bero (AS Trenčín), (Slovakia) Erik Pačinda (DAC D.Streda)
- Attack: (Slovakia) David Depetris (Spartak Trnava)

=== Individual awards ===
Manager of the season

Martin Ševela (AS Trenčín)

Player of the Year

Matúš Bero (AS Trenčín)

Young player of the Year

Martin Šulek (AS Trenčín)

== Attendances ==
#	Club	Average
1	Trnava	6,934
2	DAC	3,719
3	Zemplín	3,100
4	Trenčín	2,504
5	Ružomberok	1,856
6	Senica	1,711
7	Žilina	1,709
8	Myjava	1,556
9	Skalica	1,514
10	Železiarne	1,512
11	Slovan	1,432
12	ViOn	1,304

== See also ==
- 2015–16 Slovak Cup
- 2015–16 2. Liga (Slovakia)
- List of transfers winter 2015–16
- List of transfers summer 2015
- List of foreign players
