= Jakub Holúbek =

Slovak international football defender

Personal information
- Full name: Jakub Holúbek
- Date of birth: 12 January 1991 (age 35)
- Place of birth: Trenčín, Czechoslovakia
- Height: 1.81 m (5 ft 11 in)
- Positions: Left-back; left winger

Team information
- Current team: Trenčianske Stankovce

Youth career
- AS Trenčín

Senior career*
Years	Team	Apps	(Gls)
2010–2016	AS Trenčín	143	(19)
2016–2019	Žilina	63	(9)
2019–2024	Piast Gliwice	85	(1)
2024–2026	AS Trenčín	45	(2)
2026–	Trenčianske Stankovce	0	(0)

International career
2011–2012	Slovakia U21	9	(0)
2016–2022	Slovakia	10	(0)
- * Club domestic league appearances and goals as of 21 May 2026

Jakub Holúbek (born 12 January 1991) is a Slovak professional footballer who plays as a left-back for Slovak club Trenčianske Stankovce.

== Club career ==
A youth player of AS Trenčín, Holúbek started his professional career playing club football for the senior side. He won the double in back to back seasons in 2014–15 and 2015–16 and scored 23 goals in 190 competitive appearances. In 2016 he moved to Žilina, where he played 73 games across all competitions and celebrated the league championship in the 2016–17 season. From 2019 to 2024, Holúbek played in Poland for Piast Gliwice. He returned to Trenčín after the 2023–24 season, signing a one-year contract with his former team.

== International career ==
On 11 October 2016, Holúbek made his debut for the Slovak senior squad against Slovenia, coming on as a substitute Dušan Švento during the 79th minute as a part of the 2018 FIFA World Cup qualification. He made his first start in the following match, a 3–0 victory against Scotland.

== Career statistics ==
As of 20 May 2012

Appearances and goals by club, season and competition
Club	Season	League			Slovak Cup		Europe		Total	
Club	Season	Division	Apps	Goals	Apps	Goals	Apps	Goals	Apps	Goals
AS Trenčín	2009–10	2. liga	2	0	0	0	—		2	0
AS Trenčín	2010–11	2. liga	25	0	3	0	—		28	0
AS Trenčín	2011–12	Slovak First League	26	1	2	0	—		28	1
AS Trenčín	2012–13	Slovak First League	31	5	2	0	—		33	5
AS Trenčín	2013–14	Slovak First League	33	5	1	0	4 (Note: Appearances in UEFA Europa League)	1	38	6
Career total			117	11	8	0	4	1	129	12

== Honours ==
AS Trenčín

- Fortuna Liga: 2014–15, 2015–16
- Slovak Cup: 2014–15, 2015–16

MŠK Žilina

- Fortuna Liga: 2016–17
