= Peter Čögley =

Slovak footballer

Personal information
- Full name: Peter Čögley
- Date of birth: 11 August 1988 (age 38)
- Place of birth: Trenčín, Czechoslovakia
- Height: 1.74 m (5 ft 9 in)
- Position: Right back

Youth career
- AS Trenčín

Senior career*
Years	Team	Apps	(Gls)
2007–2015	AS Trenčín	176	(0)
2016	Bohemians 1905	12	(0)
2016–2017	Spartak Trnava	19	(0)
2017–2018	AS Trenčín	19	(0)
2018–2022	ViOn Zlaté Moravce	103	(4)
2022–2023	Skalica	17	(0)

Managerial career
- 2025–: Trenčín (Assistant)
- * Club domestic league appearances and goals as of 31 May 2023

Peter Čögley (born 11 August 1988) is a Slovak footballer who last played as a right back for Skalica.

In November 2022, Čögley joined his former manager Martin Ševela to serve as his assistant manager at Al Adalah of Saudi Professional League.

== Career statistics ==
As of 25 May 2015

Club performance			League		Cup		Continental		Total	
Season	Club	League	Apps	Goals	Apps	Goals	Apps	Goals	Apps	Goals
Slovakia			League		Slovak Cup		Europe		Total	
2007–08	AS Trenčín	Corgoň Liga	23	0	1	0	0	0	24	0
2008–09	AS Trenčín	2. liga	5	0	1	0	0	0	6	0
2009–10	AS Trenčín	2. liga	14	0	2	1	0	0	16	1
2010–11	AS Trenčín	2. liga	26	0	3	0	0	0	29	0
2011–12	AS Trenčín	Corgoň Liga	21	0	2	1	0	0	23	1
2012–13	AS Trenčín	Corgoň Liga	28	0	2	0	0	0	30	0
2013–14	AS Trenčín	Corgoň Liga	31	0	1	0	4	0	36	0
2014–15	AS Trenčín	Corgoň Liga	28	0	6	0	4	0	38	0
Career total			176	0	18	2	8	0	202	2
