= Samuel Štefánik =

Slovak footballer

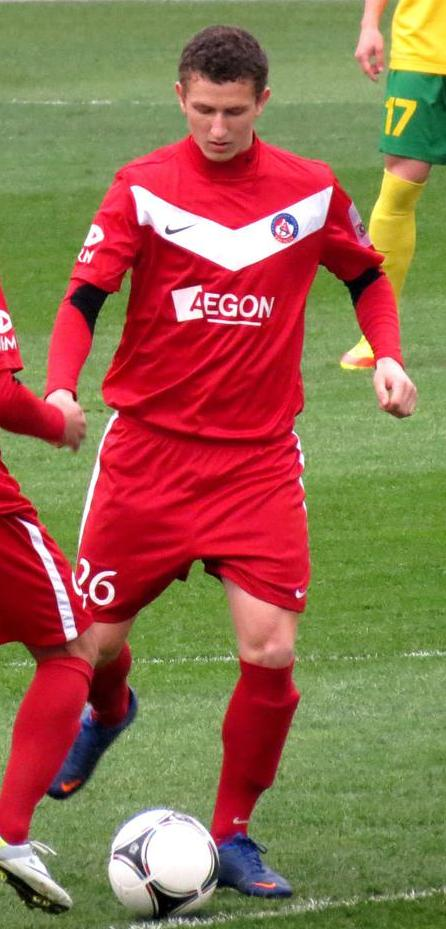

Personal information
- Date of birth: 16 November 1991 (age 34)
- Place of birth: Bánovce nad Bebravou, Czechoslovakia
- Height: 1.77 m (5 ft 10 in)
- Position: Midfielder

Team information
- Current team: Železiarne Podbrezová
- Number: 26

Youth career
- AS Trenčín

Senior career*
Years	Team	Apps	(Gls)
2010–2013	AS Trenčín	107	(21)
2013–2014	NEC Nijmegen	17	(2)
2014–2016	Slovan Bratislava	39	(1)
2016	→ Podbeskidzie (loan)	14	(3)
2016–2018	Bruk-Bet Termalica	77	(9)
2019–2020	Železiarne Podbrezová	4	(0)
2020–2022	Bruk-Bet Termalica	64	(3)
2022–2024	Spartak Trnava	41	(7)
2024–	Železiarne Podbrezová	59	(6)

International career
2009–2010	Slovakia U19	3	(0)
2011–2012	Slovakia U21	10	(1)
2013–2014	Slovakia	2	(0)
- * Club domestic league appearances and goals as of 21 September 2026

Samuel Štefánik (born 16 November 1991) is a Slovak professional footballer who plays as a midfielder for Železiarne Podbrezová.

== Club career ==
On 2 September 2013, Štefánik signed a four-year contract with N.E.C Nijmegen until the club was relegated at the end of 2013–14 Eredivisie. On 11 August 2014, he returned to Slovakia by signing for Slovan Bratislava permanently.

On 21 April 2022, it was announced that Štefanik would be joining Polish club Bruk-Bet Termalica Nieciecza. He played 64 league games in which he scored 3 goals.

On 20 June 2022, it was announced that Štefánik would be joining Slovak First League club Spartak Trnava. He made his debut for the club in a 2:0 win over Zlaté Moravce, scoring in the 1” minute of the game. Štefánik contributed a goal and a assist in a 4:0 win over Zemplín Michalovce.

== International career ==
On 14 August 2013, he made his debut for Slovakia national team against Romania, entering in as a substitute in place of Marek Hamšík.

== Career statistics ==
As of 2 September 2013

Club performance			League		Cup		Continental		Other		Total	
Season	Club	League	Apps	Goals	Apps	Goals	Apps	Goals	Apps	Goals	Apps	Goals
Slovakia			League		Slovak Cup		Europe		Other		Total	
2009–10	AS Trenčín	2. liga	11	1	0	0	–		–		11	1
2010–11	AS Trenčín	2. liga	24	6	2	0	–		–		26	6
2011–12	AS Trenčín	Corgoň Liga	32	5	2	0	0	0	–		34	5
2012–13	AS Trenčín	Corgoň Liga	33	5	1	0	–		–		34	5
2013–14	AS Trenčín	Corgoň Liga	7	4	1	0	4	0	–		12	4
total			107	21	6	0	4	0	–		117	21
Netherlands			League		KNVB Cup		Europe		Other		Total	
2013–14	NEC	Eredivisie	17	2	4	1	–		1	0	22	3
Career total			124	23	10	1	4	0	1	0	139	24

== Honours ==
Spartak Trnava: 2022–23 Slovak Cup
