= Peter Valla =

Slovak footballer

Personal information
- Full name: Peter Valla
- Date of birth: 20 March 1990 (age 36)
- Place of birth: Skalica, Czechoslovakia
- Height: 1.77 m (5 ft 9 1/2 in)
- Position: Left back

Team information
- Current team: Ošk Veselé
- Number: 9

Youth career
- Hodváb Senica
- AS Trenčín

Senior career*
Years	Team	Apps	(Gls)
2009–	AS Trenčín	49	(0)
2012–	→Piešťany (loan)		

International career^{‡}
2011	Slovakia U-21	1	(0)
- * Club domestic league appearances and goals as of 20 May 2012 ‡ National team caps and goals as of 6 December 2011

Peter Valla (born 20 March 1990 in Skalica) is a Slovak football defender who currently plays for PFK Piešťany, on loan from the Slovak Corgoň Liga club FK AS Trenčín.

== Career statistics ==
As of 20 May 2012

Club performance			League		Cup		Continental		Total	
Season	Club	League	Apps	Goals	Apps	Goals	Apps	Goals	Apps	Goals
Slovakia			League		Slovak Cup		Europe		Total	
2009–10	AS Trenčín	2. liga	22	0	3	0	0	0	25	0
2010–11	AS Trenčín	2. liga	26	0	1	0	0	0	27	0
2011–12	AS Trenčín	Corgoň Liga	1	0	0	0	0	0	1	0
Career total			49	0	4	0	0	0	53	0
