= Karim Coulibaly =

Karim Coulibaly may refer to:

- Karim Coulibaly (footballer, born 1993), Senegalese footballer
- Karim Coulibaly (footballer, born 2007), German footballer
- Karim Coulibaly Diaby (born 1989), French-Ivorian footballer
