= Peter Kleščík =

Slovak footballer

Personal information
- Full name: Peter Kleščík
- Date of birth: 18 September 1988 (age 38)
- Place of birth: Čadca, Czechoslovakia
- Height: 1.83 m (6 ft 0 in)
- Position: Centre-back

Team information
- Current team: Trenčianske Stankovce; AS Trenčín (assistant)

Youth career
- Raková
- Čadca
- AS Trenčín

Senior career*
Years	Team	Apps	(Gls)
2005–2019	AS Trenčín	355	(11)
2020–2021	Příbram	13	(0)
2021	Chojniczanka Chojnice	2	(0)
2021–	Trenčianske Stankovce		

International career
2008–2009	Slovakia U21	3	(0)
- * Club domestic league appearances and goals as of 18:10, 18 September 2024 (UTC)

Peter Kleščík (born 18 September 1988) is a Slovak footballer who plays as a centre-back for Trenčianske Stankovce. He also serves as the assistant coach of AS Trenčín.

Previously, he had spent 14 years with AS Trenčín as a player, collecting over 300 caps and winning two doubles.

== Career statistics ==
As of 21 June 2014

Appearances and goals by club, season and competition
Club	Season	League			Slovak Cup		Europe		Total	
Club	Season	Division	Apps	Goals	Apps	Goals	Apps	Goals	Apps	Goals
AS Trenčín	2006–07	Slovak Superliga	3	0	0	0	—		3	0
AS Trenčín	2007–08	Slovak Superliga	30	0	2	0	—		32	0
AS Trenčín	2008–09	2. Liga	26	0	0	0	—		26	0
AS Trenčín	2009–10	2. Liga	20	1	3	0	—		23	1
AS Trenčín	2010–11	2. Liga	33	1	3	0	—		36	1
AS Trenčín	2011–12	Slovak Superliga	32	2	2	0	—		34	2
AS Trenčín	2012–13	Slovak Superliga	23	1	2	0	—		25	1
AS Trenčín	2013–14	Slovak Superliga	32	2	0	0	4 (Note: Appearances in UEFA Europa League)	0	36	2
Career total			199	7	12	0	4	0	215	4

== Honours ==
AS Trenčín

- Fortuna Liga: 2014–15, 2015–16
- 2. Liga: 2010–11
- Slovak Cup: 2014–15, 2015–16
