= Lukáš Ďuriška =

Slovak footballer

Personal information
- Full name: Lukáš Ďuriška
- Date of birth: 16 August 1992 (age 34)
- Place of birth: Trenčín, Czechoslovakia
- Height: 1.91 m (6 ft 3 in)
- Position: Defensive midfielder

Team information
- Current team: Baník Ostrava (assistant)

Youth career
- Soblahov
- AS Trenčín

Senior career*
Years	Team	Apps	(Gls)
2011–2014	AS Trenčín	15	(0)
2012	→ AGOVV Apeldoorn (loan)	11	(0)
2013	→ Mosta (loan)	13	(1)
2014–2016	Frýdek-Místek	33	(0)
2016–2019	Raków Częstochowa	34	(1)
2018–2019	→ Ruch Chorzów (loan)	25	(2)
2019–2020	Olimpia Grudziądz	28	(1)
2020–2022	Zagłębie Sosnowiec	51	(0)
2022–2023	AS Trenčín	12	(0)
Total		222	(5)

Managerial career
- 2024: Unie Hlubina
- * Club domestic league appearances and goals

Lukáš Ďuriška (born 16 August 1992) is a Slovak former professional footballer who played as a defensive midfielder. He is currently the assistant coach of Czech First League club Baník Ostrava.

== Club career ==
In the summer of 2013, Ďuriška played in Malta for Mosta.

On 31 July 2020, he signed a two-year deal with Zagłębie Sosnowiec. On 23 May 2022, it was announced he would leave the team at the end of his contract. By June 2022, Ďuriška returned to play for AS Trenčín as a free agent.

== Career statistics ==
As of 21 June 2014

Appearances and goals by club, season and competition
Club	Season	League			National cup (Note: Includes Slovak Cup)		Europe		Total	
Club	Season	Division	Apps	Goals	Apps	Goals	Apps	Goals	Apps	Goals
AS Trenčín	2010–11	2. Liga	3	0	0	0	—		3	0
AS Trenčín	2011–12	Slovak First League	4	0	2	0	—		6	0
AS Trenčín	2012–13	Slovak First League	5	0	0	0	—		5	0
AS Trenčín	2013–14	Slovak First League	3	0	0	0	1 (Note: Appearance in UEFA Europa League)	0	4	0
AS Trenčín	Total		15	0	2	0	1	0	18	0
AGOVV Apeldoorn (loan)	2011–12	Eerste Divisie	11	0	0	0	—		11	0
Mosta (loan)	2013–14	Maltese Premier League	13	1	0	0	—		13	1
Career total			39	1	2	0	1	0	42	1

== Honours ==
Raków Częstochowa

- II liga: 2016–17
