= Volešák =

Volešák is a Czech surname. Notable people with the surname include:

- Ladislav Volešák (born 1984), Czech footballer
- Miloš Volešák (born 1984), Slovak footballer
