= Jorge Salinas (Paraguayan footballer) =

Paraguayan footballer (born 1992)

Personal information
- Full name: Jorge Martín Salinas
- Date of birth: 6 May 1992 (age 34)
- Place of birth: Pirayú, Paraguay
- Height: 1.72 m (5 ft 7 1/2 in)
- Position: Attacking midfielder

Team information
- Current team: Fernando de la Mora
- Number: 11

Youth career
- Club 24 de Junio
- 2005–2009: Libertad

Senior career*
| Years | Team | Apps | (Gls) |
| 2009–2012 | AS Trenčín | 66 | (14) |
| 2012–2013 | Legia Warsaw | 13 | (0) |
| 2014 | 3 de Febrero | 25 | (3) |
| 2015–2016 | Olimpia Asunción | 38 | (2) |
| 2016 | Sportivo Luqueño | 11 | (1) |
| 2017–2018 | JEF United Chiba | 26 | (1) |
| 2019 | River Plate (Asunción) | 34 | (14) |
| 2020 | San Lorenzo | 17 | (2) |
| 2020–2021 | Guaireña | 26 | (1) |
| 2022 | Independiente | | |
| 2023 | Club Deportivo Itapuense | | |
| 2024– | Fernando de la Mora | 4 | (0) |

International career
| 2009 | Paraguay U17 | | (1) |
- * Club domestic league appearances and goals as of 12:43, 6 May 2024 (UTC)

Jorge Martín Salinas (Spanish pronunciation: [ˈxoɾxe saˈlinas]; born 6 May 1992) is a Paraguayan footballer who plays as a midfielder for Fernando de la Mora.

== Career ==
In September 2009, he joined Slovak club AS Trenčín. In March 2010, talented Jorge Salinas graduated 4 days test at Chelsea and in May 2010 graduated camp at Ajax together with teammate Fanendo Adi.

On 20 December 2013, it was announced that Salinas had joined 3 de Febrero for the 2014 Paraguayan Primera División season, and on 4 January 2014 it was reported that the player was one of nine of the club's new signings for the 2014 season

On 17 December 2014, it was reported that Salinas had signed with Club Olimpia Asunción for the 2015 Paraguayan Primera División season.

== International career ==
Salinas participates for Paraguay U17 at the 2009 South American Under-17 Football Championship hosted in Chile. He scores in a group stage fixture against Peru U17, however, Paraguay do not advance to the next round and ultimately do not qualify for the 2009 FIFA U-17 World Cup.

== Career statistics ==
As of 5 May 2013

| Club performance | | | League | | Cup | | Continental | | Total | |
| Season | Club | League | Apps | Goals | Apps | Goals | Apps | Goals | Apps | Goals |
| Slovakia | | | League | | Slovak Cup | | Europe | | Total | |
|---|---|---|---|---|---|---|---|---|---|---|
| 2009–10 | AS Trenčín | 2. liga | 16 | 7 | 2 | 0 | 0 | 0 | 18 | 7 |
| 2010–11 | AS Trenčín | 2. liga | 20 | 5 | 0 | 0 | 0 | 0 | 20 | 5 |
| 2011–12 | AS Trenčín | Corgoň Liga | 30 | 2 | 2 | 1 | 0 | 0 | 32 | 3 |
| Career total | | | 66 | 14 | 4 | 1 | 0 | 0 | 70 | 15 |
| Club performance | | | League | | Cup | | Continental | | Total | |
| Season | Club | League | Apps | Goals | Apps | Goals | Apps | Goals | Apps | Goals |
| Poland | | | League | | Polish Cup | | Europa League | | Total | |
| 2012–13 | Legia Warsaw | Ekstraklasa | 13 | 0 | 2 | 1 | 1 | 0 | 16 | 1 |
| Career total | | | 79 | 14 | 6 | 2 | 1 | 0 | 86 | 16 |

=== International goals ===
==== Paraguay U17 ====
Score and Result list Paraguay's goal tally first.

| # | Date | Venue | Opponent | Score | Result | Competition |
|---|---|---|---|---|---|---|
| 1. | 23 April 2009 | Estadio Tierra de Campeones, Iquique, Chile | Peru | 2–0 | 2–1 | 2009 South American Under-17 Football Championship |

== Honours ==
Legia Warsaw

- Ekstraklasa: 2012–13
- Polish Cup: 2012–13

Olimpia Asunción

- Paraguayan Primera División: 2015 Clausura
