= Gabriel Bezák =

Slovak footballer

Personal information
- Full name: Gabriel Bezák
- Date of birth: 24 April 1993 (age 33)
- Place of birth: Slovakia
- Position: Forward

Youth career
- –2012: AS Trenčín

Senior career*
Years	Team	Apps	(Gls)
2012–2015	AS Trenčín	1	(0)
2013	→ Nemšová (loan)	14	(3)
2014	→ ŠK Senec (loan)	13	(2)
2015	→ FKS Nemšová (loan)	14	(3)
2015–2016	Goslarer SC	18	(3)
2016–2017	Mosta	12	(0)
2017–2018	Inter Bratislava	19	(4)

International career
- Slovakia U-15
- Slovakia U-16
- Slovakia U-17
–	Slovakia U-18		
- * Club domestic league appearances and goals as of 3 January 2021

Gabriel Bezák (born 24 April 1993) was a Slovak football forward.

Most known as playing as a winger, he began his career at AS Trenčín, where after being the top goal scorer in the youth league, would get his debut in September 2013. After multiple loans, Bezák joined Maltese Football League side Mosta, and later FK Inter Bratislava, where he would eventually retire.

== Club career ==
=== Trenčín ===
Bezák grew up in hometown AS Trenčín. In the 2011/2012 season of Slovak junior league, he scored 18 goals for AS Trenčín junior team, becoming the top goal scorer in the entire league. On 20 June 2012, he signed his first three-year professional contract with AS Trenčín. Bezák made his debut for FK AS Trenčín against FC ViOn Zlaté Moravce on 17 September 2013, entering in as a substitute in place of Tomáš Malec.

=== Later career ===
He later played in Malta for Mosta. In 2017, Bezák joined FK Inter Bratislava, where he was praised for his performances.
