= Mirko Radovanović =

Serbian footballer

Personal information
- Full name: Mirko Radovanović
- Date of birth: April 5, 1986 (age 40)
- Place of birth: Čačak, SR Serbia, SFR Yugoslavia
- Height: 1.82 m (5 ft 11 1/2 in)
- Position: Left-back

Senior career*
Years	Team	Apps	(Gls)
2002–2008	Borac Čačak	1	(0)
2003–2006	→ Remont Čačak (loan)	31	(2)
2006–2007	→ Sloboda Čačak (loan)	27	(4)
2007–2008	→ Mladi Radnik (loan)	22	(2)
2008–2009	Radnički Kragujevac	28	(2)
2009–2011	Željezničar Sarajevo	46	(2)
2012	AS Trenčín	5	(0)
2012	Smederevo	10	(0)
2013	AS Trenčín	0	(0)
2013	OPS	3	(0)
2014	Sloga Petrovac	6	(0)
2015	Zvijezda Gradačac	3	(0)
2015-2018	Sloga Požega		
2020-2022	Spartak 1976 Trnava		
- * Club domestic league appearances and goals

Mirko Radovanović (Serbian Cyrillic: Мирко Радовановић; born 5 April 1986) is a Serbian retired footballer.

== Career statistics ==
As of 20 May 2012

Club performance			League		Cup		Continental		Total	
Season	Club	League	Apps	Goals	Apps	Goals	Apps	Goals	Apps	Goals
Slovakia			League		Slovak Cup		Europe		Total	
2011–12	AS Trenčín	Corgoň Liga	5	0	0	0	0	0	5	0
Career total			5	0	0	0	0	0	5	0
