= Lukáš Kyselica =

Slovak footballer

Personal information
- Full name: Lukáš Kyselica
- Date of birth: 16 September 1993 (age 33)
- Place of birth: Trenčín, Slovakia
- Height: 1.69 m (5 ft 6 1/2 in)
- Position: Midfielder

Team information
- Current team: Wells City F.C.

Youth career
- AS Trenčín

Senior career*
Years	Team	Apps	(Gls)
2010–2012	AS Trenčín	2	(0)
2012–2013	→ Nemšová (loan)	9	(0)
2013–2014	→ Nemšová (loan)	18	(0)
2014–2015	→ Nemšová (loan)	28	(0)
2015–2016	Wells City	5	(1)
2020–2021	TJ Druzstevnik Opatova nad Vahom		
- * Club domestic league appearances and goals as of 8 August 2012

Lukáš Kyselica (born 16 September 1993 in Trenčín) is a Slovak football player.

== Career ==
The midfielder played for FK Slovan Nemšová, and in the Corgoň Liga for AS Trenčín.

In Summer 2015 joined English non league (Toolstation Western League) side Wells City F.C.
