= Aldo Baéz =

Argentine expatriate footballer

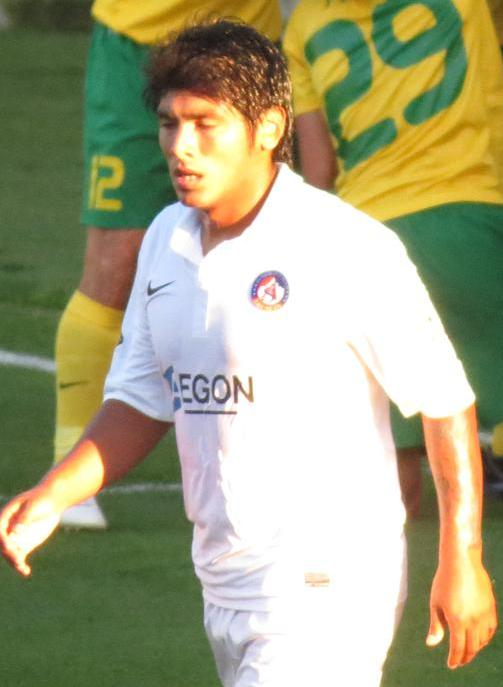

Personal information
- Full name: Aldo Omar Baéz
- Date of birth: 5 September 1988 (age 38)
- Place of birth: Buenos Aires, Argentina
- Height: 1.70 m (5 ft 7 in)
- Position: Midfielder

Team information
- Current team: ŠTK Šamorín
- Number: 8

Senior career*
Years	Team	Apps	(Gls)
- Ferro Carril Oeste
2008–2014	AS Trenčín	145	(6)
2014–2016	Slavia Prague	23	(0)
2015–2016	→ Spartak Trnava (loan)	28	(1)
2016–2017	AS Trenčín	5	(0)
2017–2018	Železiarne Podbrezová	19	(0)
2018–2020	iClinic Sereď	23	(2)
2019–2020	→ ŠTK Šamorín (loan)	7	(0)
2020–	ŠTK Šamorín	92	(1)
- * Club domestic league appearances and goals as of 15 June 2025

Aldo Omar Baéz (born 5 September 1988) is an Argentine footballer who plays as a midfielder for ŠTK Šamorín.

== Club career ==
=== Trenčín ===
In January 2008, he joined the Corgoň liga club AS Trenčín. Baéz came to Trenčín together with fellow Argentine youngster David Depetris. Whilst at Trenčín, he became known for his physical style of play, which brought him numerous yellow cards. In July 2014, he left the club after almost seven years to join Czech side Slavia Prague.

=== Slavia Prague ===
Baéz penned a three-year contract upon his arrival at the Eden Arena. On 26 July, the midfielder made his competitive debut for the club in a 2-1 league victory over 1. FC Slovácko, when he came on at the interval.
