= Miloš Volešák =

Retired Slovak football goalkeeper

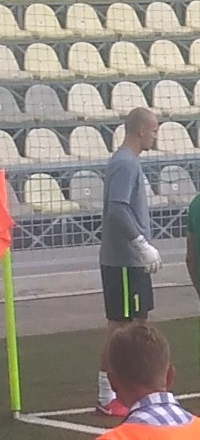

Personal information
- Full name: Miloš Volešák
- Date of birth: 20 April 1984 (age 42)
- Place of birth: Trenčín, Czechoslovakia
- Height: 1.90 m (6 ft 3 in)
- Position: Goalkeeper

Team information
- Current team: Žilina (goalkeeping coach)

Youth career
- AS Trenčín

Senior career*
Years	Team	Apps	(Gls)
2002–2014	AS Trenčín	260	(0)
2005	→ Nové Mesto nad Váhom (loan)		
2014–2022	Žilina	117	(0)

International career
	Slovakia U16	2	(0)
2002	Slovakia U20	4	
2003	Slovakia U21	1	
- * Club domestic league appearances and goals

Miloš Volešák (born 20 April 1984) is a Slovak former professional footballer who played as a goalkeeper. He spent most of his career in AS Trenčín and MŠK Žilina, his last club, where he retired at the end of 2022 and transitioned into a goalkeeping coach.

Volešák was called up to Slovakia national team as member of the broader squad in 2017, but had failed to make a debut.

== Career statistics ==
As of 21 June 2014

Appearances and goals by club, season and competition
Club	Season	League			Slovak Cup		Europe		Total	
Club	Season	Division	Apps	Goals	Apps	Goals	Apps	Goals	Apps	Goals
AS Trenčín	2007–08	Corgoň Liga	14	0	0	0	0	0	14	0
AS Trenčín	2008–09	2. liga	33	0	0	0	0	0	33	0
AS Trenčín	2009–10	2. liga	25	0	2	0	0	0	27	0
AS Trenčín	2010–11	2. liga	31	0	2	0	0	0	33	0
AS Trenčín	2011–12	Corgoň Liga	32	0	2	0	0	0	34	0
AS Trenčín	2012–13	Corgoň Liga	32	0	2	0	0	0	34	0
AS Trenčín	2013–14	Corgoň Liga	32	0	0	0	4	0	36	0
Career total			199	0	8	0	4	0	211	0

== Honours ==
MSK Žilina

- Fortuna Liga: 2016–17
