= Filip Hlohovský =

Slovak footballer

Personal information
- Full name: Filip Hlohovský
- Date of birth: 13 June 1988 (age 38)
- Place of birth: Handlová, Czechoslovakia
- Height: 1.78 m (5 ft 10 in)
- Position: Winger

Youth career
- Prievidza
- 2003–2006: AS Trenčín

Senior career*
Years	Team	Apps	(Gls)
2007–2012	AS Trenčín	149	(31)
2012–2014	Slovan Bratislava	43	(10)
2014–2015	Senica	38	(8)
2015–2017	Žilina	56	(23)
2017	Seongnam	16	(4)
2018	Daejeon Citizen	3	(0)
2019	Železiarne Podbrezová	9	(1)
2020–2024	Baník Prievidza	24	(10)
Total		338	(87)

International career
- Slovakia U18
- Slovakia U19
- Slovakia U20
- Slovakia U21
2017	Slovakia	2	(0)

Managerial career
- 2024–: Baník Prievidza
- * Club domestic league appearances and goals as of 31 January 2022

Filip Hlohovský (born 13 June 1988) is a Slovak football winger who plays for Baník Prievidza.

== Club career ==
Hlhovský was born in Handlová. Filip started his career in Prievidza, later was transferred to AS Trenčín. On 28 May 2012, he signed a four-year contract with ŠK Slovan Bratislava.

== International career ==
Hlohovský was first called up to the senior national team for two unofficial friendly fixtures held in Abu Dhabi, UAE, in January 2017, against Uganda and Sweden. He capped his debut against Uganda, being fielded from the start and playing the entire match. Slovakia went on to lose the game 1–3. He also played the first half of the 0–6 loss to Sweden, when he was substituted by Patrik Mišák. Hlohovský failed to score from the penalty kick in the 30th minute of the match, when the score was 0–1. Being the top scorer of Fortuna Liga at the time, he somewhat failed to meet public expectations.

== Career statistics ==
As of 20 May 2012

Club performance			League		Cup		Continental		Total	
Season	Club	League	Apps	Goals	Apps	Goals	Apps	Goals	Apps	Goals
Slovakia			League		Slovak Cup		Europe		Total	
2006–07	AS Trenčín	Corgoň Liga	9	0	0	0	0	0	9	0
2007–08	AS Trenčín	Corgoň Liga	30	3	2	0	0	0	32	3
2008–09	AS Trenčín	2. liga	29	13	1	0	0	0	30	13
2009–10	AS Trenčín	2. liga	28	7	3	2	0	0	31	9
2010–11	AS Trenčín	2. liga	24	2	3	2	0	0	27	4
2011–12	AS Trenčín	Corgoň Liga	29	6	2	1	0	0	31	7
2012–13	Slovan Bratislava	Corgoň Liga	0	0	0	0	0	0	0	0
Career total			149	31	11	5	0	0	160	36

== Honours ==
=== Player ===
Slovan Bratislava

- Fortuna Liga: Winners (2): 2012-13, 2013-14
- Slovak Cup: Winners: 2012-13

MŠK Žilina

- Fortuna Liga: Winners: 2016-17

=== Manager ===
Baník Prievidza

- 4.Liga: Winners: 2024-25 (Promoted)

=== Individual ===
- Fortuna Liga Player of the year 2015-16
