= Marián Kovář =

Czech footballer

Personal information
- Date of birth: 13 August 1993 (age 33)
- Place of birth: Czech Republic
- Height: 1.86 m (6 ft 1 in)
- Position: Forward

Team information
- Current team: Hanácká Slavia Kroměříž
- Number: 13

Senior career*
Years	Team	Apps	(Gls)
2011–2013	Slovácko	30	(3)
2013–2015	Baumit Jablonec	0	(0)
2014–2015	→ Vysočina Jihlava (loan)	7	(1)
2015–2016	Slovácko	10	(1)
2016–2017	Elseremo Brumov		
2017–	Hanácká Slavia Kroměříž	74	(19)

International career^{‡}
2012	Czech Republic U21	1	(0)
- * Club domestic league appearances and goals as of 29 September 2019 ‡ National team caps and goals as of 6 May 2013

Marián Kovář (born 13 August 1993) is a Czech footballer, who plays as a forward for Hanácká Slavia Kroměříž. He has represented his country at under-21 level.
