= Elvist Ciku =

Albanian footballer (born 1986)

Personal information
- Date of birth: 16 August 1986 (age 40)
- Place of birth: Shkodër, Albania
- Height: 1.80 m (5 ft 11 in)
- Position: Midfielder

Youth career
- 1992–1997: Vllaznia
- AE Peristasi

Senior career*
Years	Team	Apps	(Gls)
2004–2006	GAS Svoronos		
2006–2007	Aiginiakos		
2007–2009	Ethnikos Katerini		
2009–2014	Karviná	103	(21)
2014	GKS Katowice	3	(0)
2014–2017	MAS Táborsko	60	(9)
- * Club domestic league appearances and goals

Elvist Ciku (born 16 August 1986) is an Albanian professional footballer who plays as a midfielder. Besides Albania, he has played in Greece, Poland and the Czech Republic.

== Early life ==
Getting into football at the age of six with FK Vllaznia in his home country, Ciku moved to Greece in 1997 where he joined the youth ranks of AE Peristasi, living there for nine years crediting his success as a professional footballer to his father who succored him in his rise.

== Career ==
After playing for MFK Karviná of the Czech National Football League from 2009 to 2014, the Albanian midfielder got used to the climate there before transferring to Polish club GKS Katowice in 2014. where he did not get paid for half a year despite a large fan support for the club. Ciku then ended up at FC MAS Táborsko, again in the Czech Republic, where he settled in well before departing in 2017.
