= Peter Štyvar =

Slovak footballer (born 1980)

Personal information
- Full name: Peter Štyvar
- Date of birth: 13 August 1980 (age 46)
- Place of birth: Rožňava, Czechoslovakia
- Height: 1.84 m (6 ft 0 in)
- Position: Striker

Team information
- Current team: Rožňava
- Number: 18

Youth career
- MFK Rožňava
- 1. FC Košice

Senior career*
Years	Team	Apps	(Gls)
1998–1999	FC Lokomotíva Košice		
1999–2000	ŽP Podbrezová		
2000	Ozeta Trenčín	12	(1)
2001–2004	FK Teplice	0	(0)
2001	→ FC Chomutov (loan)	8	(0)
2002	→ 1. SK Prostějov (loan)	8	(0)
2002–2003	→ FC Chomutov (loan)	25	(5)
2004–2005	FK Ústí nad Labem	27	(8)
2005–2006	AS Trenčín	51	(4)
2007–2008	MŠK Žilina	57	(30)
2009–2010	Bristol City	10	(0)
2009	→ Skoda Xanthi (loan)	4	(0)
2010	→ FC Spartak Trnava (loan)	9	(0)
2010–2011	FK Fotbal Třinec	7	(1)
2012–2012	AS Trenčín	12	(2)
2012	→ ŠK SFM Senec (loan)	9	(3)
2013–	SP MFK Rožňava		
2014	→ Ružiná (loan)		
2014–2015	→ Galanta (loan)		
2015	→ Andau (loan)		
2017	→ Rožňava		

International career^{‡}
2009–	Slovakia	2	(0)
- * Club domestic league appearances and goals as of 23 August 2014 ‡ National team caps and goals as of 25 March 2010

Peter Štyvar (born 13 August 1980 in Rožňava) is a Slovak football striker who plays for SP MFK Rožňava. He had spells in England with Championship club Bristol City and in Greece with Skoda Xanthi.

== Club career ==
He scored the winning goal in the 2008–09 UEFA Cup group stage game against Aston Villa for MŠK Žilina, which they won 2–1.

Štyvar joined Bristol City on 1 January 2009, signing a two-and-a-half-year contract. He made his Bristol City debut on 3 January against Premier League club Portsmouth in the FA Cup in a game that finished 0–0.

He returned to Slovakia in February 2010, joining FC Spartak Trnava on loan until the end of the season. He was on trial at MFK Ružomberok in summer 2010. On 9 September 2010 Bristol City cancelled Styvar's contract.

== International career ==
Slovakia national manager Vladimír Weiss selected him for the friendly match against Greece on 20 August 2008, but Štyvar did not play in this match. His international debut came in second half the Slovakia vs. Ukraine friendly match on 10 February 2009.
