= Pavel Malíř =

Czech footballer

Personal information
- Full name: Pavel Malíř
- Date of birth: 8 April 1979 (age 47)
- Place of birth: Bohumín, Czech Republic
- Height: 1.79 m (5 ft 10 in)
- Position: Midfielder

Youth career
- FC Karviná

Senior career*
Years	Team	Apps	(Gls)
1997–1998	Dukla Hranice	-	(-)
1999–2001	FC Karviná	42	(1)
2001	FC Hennigsdorf	-	(-)
2002–2015	FK Fotbal Třinec	350	(38)
2016	Petrovice		
- * Club domestic league appearances and goals

Pavel Malíř (born 8 April 1975 in Bohumín, Czech Republic) is a former Czech footballer who mostly played for FK Fotbal Třinec in Czech 2. Liga as a right sided midfielder.

He spent the early years of his career at his local club FC Karviná. He also played in the German Regional divisions with FC Hennigsdorf before moving to FK Fotbal Třinec who at the time played in Moravian–Silesian Football League, 3rd tier of Czech football. Malíř has gone on to make 350 appearances for the club, where he serves as a key player in the squad.
