= Vojtech Horváth =

Slovak footballer

Personal information
- Full name: Vojtech Horváth
- Date of birth: 28 June 1984 (age 42)
- Place of birth: Dunajská Streda, Czechoslovakia
- Height: 1.80 m (5 ft 11 in)
- Position: Midfielder

Senior career*
Years	Team	Apps	(Gls)
- Šamorín
2006–2009	Inter Bratislava	52	(6)
2006	→ Močenok (loan)		
2009	Artmedia Petržalka	14	(1)
2009–2012	AS Trenčín	72	(10)
2012–2014	Termalica Bruk-Bet	43	(5)
2014–2016	Dunajská Streda	34	(3)
2017–2018	FC Illmitz		
2019	Šamorín B		

International career
- Slovakia U17
- Slovakia U19
- Slovakia U20
- Slovakia U21
- * Club domestic league appearances and goals

Vojtech Horváth (born 28 June 1984) is a Slovak former professional footballer who played as a midfielder.
