= Ján Varga =

Slovak footballer

Personal information
- Full name: Ján Varga
- Date of birth: 21 July 1990 (age 36)
- Place of birth: Levice, Czechoslovakia
- Height: 1.79 m (5 ft 10 1/2 in)
- Position: Striker

Team information
- Current team: FK Slovan Levice

Youth career
- MFK Dubnica

Senior career*
Years	Team	Apps	(Gls)
2011–2012	Dubnica	24	(2)
2012–	Levice		
- * Club domestic league appearances and goals as of 1 June 2012

Ján Varga (born 21 July 1990 in Levice) is a Slovak football player who currently plays for FK Slovan Levice. His former club was MFK Dubnica. He made his debut for MFK Dubnica against FC ViOn Zlaté Moravce on 30 April 2011.
