= Martin Ševela =

Slovak footballer and manager

Personal information
- Full name: Martin Ševela
- Date of birth: 20 November 1975 (age 50)
- Place of birth: Most pri Bratislave, Czechoslovakia
- Height: 1.83 m (6 ft 0 in)
- Position: Centre-back

Team information
- Current team: Al-Fahaheel (head coach)

Youth career
- Inter Bratislava

Senior career*
Years	Team	Apps	(Gls)
1995–2001	Inter Bratislava		
1998	→ AS Trenčín (loan)		
2002–2004	Dubnica		
2004–2005	Drnovice	20	(0)
2005–2006	Slovan Bratislava		
2007–2008	Inter Bratislava		
2009–2012	AS Trenčín	92	(10)

Managerial career
- 2012–2013: AS Trenčín (assistant)
- 2013–2017: AS Trenčín
- 2017–2019: Slovan Bratislava
- 2019–2021: Zagłębie Lubin
- 2021–2022: Abha Club
- 2022–2023: Al-Adalah
- 2023–2024: Al-Okhdood
- 2024–2025: Al-Adalah
- 2026–: Al-Fahaheel
- * Club domestic league appearances and goals

Martin Ševela (born 20 November 1975) is a Slovak professional football manager and former player who played as a centre-back. He is the manager of Kuwaiti club Al-Fahaheel. Besides Slovakia, he has managed in Poland and Saudi Arabia.

== Career statistics ==
As of 20 May 2012

Appearances and goals by club, season and competition
Club	Season	League			Slovak Cup		Europe		Total	
Club	Season	Division	Apps	Goals	Apps	Goals	Apps	Goals	Apps	Goals
AS Trenčín	2008–09	2. liga	14	1	0	0	0	0	14	1
AS Trenčín	2009–10	2. liga	28	4	2	0	0	0	30	4
AS Trenčín	2010–11	2. liga	31	5	1	0	0	0	32	5
AS Trenčín	2011–12	Corgoň Liga	19	0	0	0	0	0	19	0
Career total			92	10	3	0	0	0	95	10

== Managerial statistics ==
As of match played 29 May 2025

Managerial record by team and tenure
Team	Nat	From	To	Record				
Team	Nat	From	To	G	W	D	L	Win %
Trenčín	(Slovakia)	1 July 2013	12 September 2017	74	40	10	24	54.05
Slovan Bratislava	(Slovakia)	30 October 2017	18 July 2019	63	42	10	11	66.67
Zagłębie Lubin	(Poland)	16 September 2019	1 July 2021	65	28	14	23	43.08
Abha	(Saudi Arabia)	1 July 2021	30 June 2022	31	9	8	14	29.03
Al-Adalah	(Saudi Arabia)	23 October 2022	1 June 2023	23	6	6	11	26.09
Al-Okhdood	(Saudi Arabia)	10 November 2023	17 April 2024	15	5	2	8	33.33
Al-Adalah	(Saudi Arabia)	19 June 2024	1 June 2025	37	17	10	10	45.95
Total				308	147	60	101	47.73

== Honours ==
=== Manager ===
AS Trenčín

- Slovak First Football League: 2014–15, 2015–16
- Slovak Cup: 2014–15, 2015–16

ŠK Slovan Bratislava

- Slovak First Football League: 2018–19
- Slovak Cup: 2017–18

=== Individual ===
- Fortuna Liga Manager of the Season: 2015-16
