= Petr Nekuda =

Czech footballer (born 1990)

Personal information
- Full name: Petr Nekuda
- Date of birth: 27 April 1990 (age 36)
- Place of birth: Olomouc, Czechoslovakia
- Height: 1.89 m (6 ft 2 in)
- Position: Striker

Team information
- Current team: Prostějov
- Number: 10

Youth career
- SK Bělkovice-Laštany
- HFK Olomouc
- Sigma Olomouc

Senior career*
Years	Team	Apps	(Gls)
2010–2016	Sigma Olomouc	0	(0)
2011–2012	→ Třinec (loan)	26	(4)
2012	→ Zbrojovka Brno (loan)	2	(0)
2013	→ HFK Olomouc (loan)	12	(2)
2013–2014	→ Opava (loan)	29	(13)
2014–2015	→ Retz (loan)	23	(7)
2015–	Prostějov	29	(13)
- * Club domestic league appearances and goals as of 8 September 2016

Petr Nekuda (born 27 April 1990 in Olomouc) is a professional Czech football player. Nekuda plays mostly as a striker and is currently playing for Prostějov in the Czech National Football League.
