= Branislav Mráz =

Slovak footballer and manager

Personal information
- Full name: Branislav Mráz
- Date of birth: 13 July 1973 (age 53)
- Place of birth: Malacky, Czechoslovakia
- Height: 1.78 m (5 ft 10 in)
- Position: Centre back

Senior career*
Years	Team	Apps	(Gls)
- Senica
1999–2004	Dubnica		
2004–2010	Rimavská Sobota		

Managerial career
- 2011–2013: Rimavská Sobota
- 2013–2015: ViOn Zlaté Moravce
- 2015: Spartak Trnava
- 2016: Dinamo Tbilisi (Assistant)
- 2016–2018: ViOn Zlaté Moravce (Assistant)
- 2018: ViOn Zlaté Moravce (carateker)
- 2021: Senica (Assistant)
- 2021: Pohronie (Assistant)
- 2023: FK Dečić (Assistant)
- 2023-2024: MFK Karviná (Assistant)
- 2024-: Rimavská Sobota
- * Club domestic league appearances and goals

Branislav Mráz (born 13 July 1973) is a Slovak football manager and former player.
