= Kozić =

Kozić (Serbian Cyrillic: Козић) is a surname. Notable people with the surname include:

- Refik Kozić (born 1950), Yugoslav footballer
- Alen Kozić (born 1976), Yugoslav footballer, son of Refik
- Neda Kozić (born 1985), Serbian tennis player and coach
- Una Kozić (born 2001), Serbian actress
