= Radek Szmek =

Czech footballer

Personal information
- Date of birth: 13 August 1986 (age 40)
- Place of birth: Czechoslovakia
- Height: 1.97 m (6 ft 6 in)
- Position: Striker

Team information
- Current team: 1. FC Slovácko
- Number: 14

Youth career
- Sokol Písek
- Spartak Jablunkov
- 2000–2004: Třinec

Senior career*
Years	Team	Apps	(Gls)
2004–2010	Třinec	108	(14)
2008	→ Frýdek-Místek (loan)		
2010–2011	→ 1. FC Slovácko (loan)	22	(2)
2011–	1. FC Slovácko	0	(0)
2011–2012	→ Třinec (loan)	0	(0)
- * Club domestic league appearances and goals as of 5 June 2011

Radek Szmek (born 13 August 1986) is a football player from the Czech Republic. He belongs to the Polish minority in the Czech Republic.

Szmek played most of his career for the Second League side Třinec where he emerged as a product of the youth teams before moving on loan to Frýdek-Místek in 2008. In 2010, he went on loan to Czech First League side 1. FC Slovácko who bought him at the end of his loan spell. The tall striker has since returned to Třinec on loan.
