= Ľuboš Nosický =

Slovak footballer and manager

Personal information
- Full name: Ľuboš Nosický
- Date of birth: 4 September 1967 (age 59)
- Place of birth: Nová Dubnica, Czechoslovakia
- Positions: Midfielder; defender

Youth career
- MFK Nová Dubnica

Senior career*
Years	Team	Apps	(Gls)
- Zbrojovka Brno
- Dubnica
1990–1992	Dukla Prague		
1992–1994	Drnovice	34	(0)
- Dubnica
- Drnovice

Managerial career
- 2005: Dubnica
- 2006–2008: Žilina (Assistant)
- 2009: Dubnica
- 2009: Spartak Trnava
- 2010: Slovakia U21 (interim)
- 2011–2012: Žilina
- 2013: AS Trenčín
- * Club domestic league appearances and goals as of 30 August 2013

Ľuboš Nosický (born 4 September 1967) is a former Slovak football player and former manager of FK AS Trenčín.

He played football for FK Drnovice making 34 appearances for the club in the Czech league.
