= Štadión Rapid =

Multi-use stadium

- Interactive map of Štadión Rapid
- Location: Bratislava, Slovakia
- Coordinates: 48°08′46″N 17°10′38″E
- Capacity: 3,000
- Surface: Grass
- Field size: 105 x 64 m

Štadión Rapid is a multi-use stadium in Bratislava, Slovakia. It is currently used mostly for football matches. The stadium holds 3,000 people.

== History ==
During the 1960s, the motorcycle speedway team AMK Bratislava constructed a track around the outside of the football pitch. The team competed in the Czechoslovak Team Speedway Championship.
