= Štefan Horný =

Slovak footballer and manager

Personal information
- Full name: Štefan Horný
- Date of birth: 13 January 1957 (age 69)
- Place of birth: Kúty, Czechoslovakia
- Position: Midfielder

Youth career
- FC Kúty
- TJ Pozemné Stavby
- Rapid Bratislava

Senior career*
Years	Team	Apps	(Gls)
?–1978	Rapid Bratislava		
1978–?	Zbrojovka Brno		
?–1983	Dukla Prague		
1983–?	Slovan Bratislava		
- ZŤS Malacky

International career
1981	ČSSR "B"	2	(0)

Managerial career
- Slovan Bratislava
- ŠKP Devín
- Senec
- 2004–2005: DAC Dunajská Streda
- 2005: Tatran Prešov
- 2006–2007: Artmedia Petržalka
- 2008: Dukla Banská Bystrica
- 2008–2009: ViOn Zlaté Moravce
- 2011: DAC Dunajská Streda
- 2012–2015: Skalica
- 2015–2016: Skalica
- * Club domestic league appearances and goals as of 1 July 2015

Štefan Horný (born 13 January 1957) is a former Slovak football player and recently manager of MFK Skalica. He also managed a FK DAC 1904 Dunajská Streda.

== Honours ==
=== Manager ===
MFK Skalica

- DOXXbet liga: Runners-Up: 2014–15 (Promoted)
- 3. liga: Runners-Up: 2013-14 (Promoted)
