= Marek Fabuľa =

Slovak footballer and manager

Personal information
- Full name: Marek Fabuľa
- Date of birth: 5 August 1975 (age 51)
- Place of birth: Prešov, Czechoslovakia
- Height: 1.83 m (6 ft 0 in)
- Position: Midfielder

Youth career
- Tatran Prešov

Senior career*
Years	Team	Apps	(Gls)
1995–1998	Tatran Prešov	56	(2)
1997	→ Vranov nad Topľou (loan)		
1999–2000	Slovan Bratislava	30	(2)
2000–2002	Ružomberok	51	(7)
2002	Tatran Prešov		
2003–2004	1. FC Košice	1	(0)
2004	→ Dunajská Streda (loan)	7	(0)
2004	Dunajská Streda	15	(2)
2004–2007	ENTHOI Lakatamia FC		
2008–2009	Vysoké Tatry – Starý Smokovec		
2010	FK Záborské		

Managerial career
- Prešov (youth)
- 2013: Prešov (assistant)
- 2014: MFK Košice B (assistant)
- 2014: MFK Košice B
- 2015: MFK Košice
- 2015–2017: ŽP Šport Podbrezová
- 2017–2018: Železiarne Podbrezová
- 2019–2020: FC Košice
- 2021–2022: Deren
- 2022–2023: Tatran Liptovský Mikuláš
- 2026-: Prešov (Sp.Director)
- * Club domestic league appearances and goals

Marek Fabuľa (born 5 August 1975) is a Slovak former footballer and manager.

== Managerial career ==
In 2019, Fabuľa returned to FC Košice. In 2021, he moved to Mongolia, taking over Deren FC.

On 21 November 2021, it was announced that Fabuľa had become the new manager of MFK Tatran Liptovský Mikuláš, leaving Deren FC. He would be sacked three months later after 3 consecutive losses in a row with his team in last place on 10 points.
