= Juraj Sabol =

Slovak footballer and manager

Personal information
- Full name: Juraj Sabol
- Date of birth: 4 December 1983 (age 42)
- Place of birth: Czechoslovakia

Team information
- Current team: FK Senica (manager)

Senior career*
Years	Team	Apps	(Gls)
- Tatran Prešov
- Slovan Nižná Šebastová

Managerial career
- 2015: Liptovský Mikuláš
- 2015–2016: Senica
- 2016: Liptovský Mikuláš
- * Club domestic league appearances and goals as of 9 September 2015

Juraj Sabol (born 4 December 1983) is a former football player from Slovakia and last manager of Liptovský Mikuláš.

== Career ==
On 8 September 2015, he was appointed as a head coach of FK Senica. On May 26zh, 2016 he was sacked. As a coach of MFK Tatran Liptovský Mikuláš, he achieved the best place in club history, 4th in 2014–2015 Slovak Second Football League.
