= David Depetris =

Slovak footballer (born 1988)

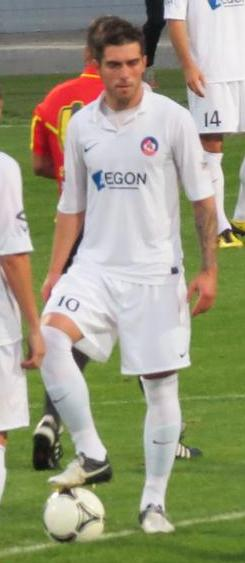

Personal information
- Full name: David Alberto Depetris
- Date of birth: 11 November 1988 (age 38)
- Place of birth: San Jorge, Argentina
- Height: 1.85 m (6 ft 1 in)
- Position: Forward

Youth career
- C.D. San Jorge

Senior career*
Years	Team	Apps	(Gls)
2005–2007	Atlético de Rafaela	32	(10)
2008–2012	AS Trenčín	135	(86)
2010	→ Almere City (loan)	10	(2)
2013–2015	Çaykur Rizespor	19	(7)
2014	→ Sigma Olomouc (loan)	13	(3)
2014–2015	→ Monarcas Morelia (loan)	23	(4)
2015–2016	Spartak Trnava	21	(15)
2016–2018	Atlético Huracán	2	(1)
2017–2018	→ Olimpo (loan)	19	(4)
2018	→ CA Sarmiento (loan)	6	(0)
2019	Spartak Trnava	9	(2)
2019–2020	AS Trenčín	31	(2)
2021	Savoia	12	(3)
2021–2024	Dukla Banská Bystrica	60	(24)
2024	Železiarne Podbrezová	9	(2)
2025	Považská Bystrica	11	(1)

International career
2013	Slovakia	2	(0)
- * Club domestic league appearances and goals as of 15 June 2025

David Alberto Depetris (born 11 November 1988) is a former professional footballer who played as a forward. Born in Argentina, he played for the Slovakia national team.

He started his European career in Slovak First League club AS Trenčín.

== Club career ==
=== Early years ===
Born in San Jorge, Argentina, Depetris began his career with hometown club C.D. San Jorge. In 2005, he joined Atlético de Rafaela and three years later he moved to Europe, to Slovak club AS Trenčín. He scored 21 goals in 30 matches in his first season in the Slovak second league.

=== AS Trenčín ===
Depetris joined AS Trenčín in January 2008. He was the top goalscorer in two Slovak 1. liga seasons; in the 2008–09 Slovak 1. liga season, scoring 21 goals, and in the 2010–11 Slovak 1. liga season, scoring 31 goals in 30 matches.

=== Çaykur Rizespor ===
After scoring a record 16 goals in the first half of the 2012–13 season at Trenčín, Depetris signed a three-and-a-half-year contract in the winter transfer window of 2013, with the TFF First League club Çaykur Rizespor. He made his debut on 27 January 2013 against Adana Demirspor, when he substituted Cumali Bişi. Çaykur Rizespor lost 1–2. David Depetris scored his first and second goals in the TFF First League against TKİ Tavşanlı Linyitspor on 3 February 2013.

=== Monarcas Morelia ===
Depetris was loaned by Çaykur Rizespor to Monarcas Morelia which currently plays in the Liga MX. Prior to arrival to Mexico, David Depetris played for SK Sigma Olomouc in the Czech First League.

=== Železiarne Podbrezová ===
In June 2024, Depetris joined Železiarne Podbrezová on a free transfer from Hron Valley rivals Dukla Banská Bystrica to aid the young squad members as a team-leading player, per descriptions provided by the General Manager of Železiari Miroslav Poliaček. Podbrezová's manager Roman Skuhravý spoke of Depetris as a missing link from the previous season.

== International career ==
Depetris has Argentine, Italian and Slovak citizenship. He received Italian citizenship before his arrival in Europe, being of Italian descent. He spent five years in Slovakia, thereby qualifying to receive citizenship. Depetris received Slovak citizenship on 21 March 2013 and since then has been eligible to represent the Slovakia national football team. Depetris received an invitation to the Slovak national football team from coaching duo Stanislav Griga and Michal Hipp. After he obtained Slovak citizenship in March 2013, Depetris could have debuted for the national team in the 2014 match against Liechtenstein; however he ended up missing the match due to a muscle injury which flared up during training. He made his national team debut on 14 August against Romania.

== Career statistics ==
As of match played on 17 March 2018

Appearances and goals by club, season and competition
Club	Season	League			Cup		League Cup		Other		Total	
Club	Season	Division	Apps	Goals	Apps	Goals	Apps	Goals	Apps	Goals	Apps	Goals
Atlético Rafaela	2008–09	Primera B Nacional	4	1	0	0	—				4	1
Atlético Rafaela	2009–10	Primera B Nacional	1	0	0	0	—				1	0
Atlético Rafaela	Total		5	1	0	0	0	0	0	0	5	1
Omniworld (loan)	2009–10	Eerste Divisie	10	2	0	0	—				10	2
Trenčín	2011–12	Slovak First Football League	31	8	1	0	—				32	8
Trenčín	2012–13	Slovak First Football League	19	16	1	1	—				20	17
Trenčín	Total		50	24	2	1	0	0	0	0	52	25
Rizespor	2012–13	TFF First League	13	6	0	0	—				13	6
Rizespor	2013–14	Süper Lig	6	1	1	0	—				7	1
Rizespor	Total		19	7	1	0	0	0	0	0	20	7
Sigma Olomouc	2013–14	Czech First League	13	3	0	0	—				13	3
Morelia	2014–15	Liga MX	23	4	3	3	—		2	1	28	8
Spartak Trnava	2015–16	Slovak First Football League	21	15	1	0	—				22	15
Huracán	2016–17	Argentine Primera División	2	1	0	0	—		2	0	4	1
Olimpo (loan)	2017–18	Argentine Primera División	14	3	3	0	—				17	3
Career totals			157	60	10	4	0	0	4	1	171	65

== Personal life ==
Depetris is married to Slovak fitness trainer Erika Depetris (née Kačincová). His brother, Rodrigo, is also a footballer.

== Honours ==
Spartak Trnava

- Slovak Cup: 2018–19

Individual

- Slovak Super Liga top scorer: 2012–13 (16 goals)
- Slovak Second League top scorer: 2008–09 (21 goals), 2010–11 (31 goals)
