= Libor Fašiang =

Slovak footballer and manager

Personal information
- Date of birth: 21 June 1958 (age 68)
- Place of birth: Czechoslovakia
- Height: 1.78 m (5 ft 10 in)
- Position: Defender

Senior career*
Years	Team	Apps	(Gls)
1981–1982	Spišská Nová Ves	28	(0)
1982–1990	Spartak Trnava	204	(3)

Managerial career
- 2001–2002: Spartak Trnava
- 2003: Slovan Bratislava
- 2010–2012: Senica (assistant coach)
- 2012: FC Neded
- 2013: Šamorín
- 2015: Šaľa
- 2015: Zlaté Moravce (assistant coach)
- 2015–2016: Zlaté Moravce
- 2016: Rimavská Sobota
- 2020–2021: Nové Mesto
- 2022–2023: FK Senica
- * Club domestic league appearances and goals

Libor Fašiang (born 21 June 1958) is a Slovak football manager and former player.

He made 204 appearances in the Czechoslovak First League for FC Spartak Trnava, scoring 3 goals. He coached their U17 side in 2017.
