= Martin Hruška =

Czech footballer

Personal information
- Full name: Martin Hruška
- Date of birth: 11 May 1981 (age 45)
- Place of birth: Bílá Třemešná, Czechoslovakia
- Height: 1.68 m (5 ft 6 in)
- Position: Winger

Youth career
- Bílá Třemešná

Senior career*
Years	Team	Apps	(Gls)
2001	Teplice		
2001–2004	Chomutov		
2004–2005	Ústí nad Labem		
2005–2006	Baník Most	7	(0)
2006–2007	Ústí nad Labem	25	(2)
2007–2010	Spartak Trnava	78	(16)
2010	Viktoria Plzeň	3	(0)
2011–2012	ViOn Zlaté Moravce	40	(7)
2012–2013	Fastav Zlín	39	(4)
- * Club domestic league appearances and goals as of 1 January 2014

Martin Hruška (born 11 May 1981) is a Czech football winger who plays for Zlín.
