= Krisztián Németh (Slovak footballer) =

Slovak footballer and manager

Personal information
- Date of birth: 5 April 1975 (age 51)
- Place of birth: Dunajská Streda, Czechoslovakia
- Height: 1.86 m (6 ft 1 in)
- Position: Centre back

Youth career
- Orechová Potôň
- 1989–1995: DAC Dunajská Streda

Senior career*
Years	Team	Apps	(Gls)
1995	DAC Dunajská Streda		
1995–1996	Slovan Bratislava B		
1996–1997	Koba Senec		
1997–2001	DAC Dunajská Streda	101	(8)
2001–2002	Družstevník Báč		
2002–2005	FC Rimavská Sobota		
2005	FC Tatabánya		
2006	FK Púchov		
2006–2011	DAC Dunajská Streda	72	(4)

International career
2004	Slovakia	1	(0)

Managerial career
- 2010–2011: DAC Dunajská Streda (assistant coach)
- 2011–2012: DAC Dunajská Streda
- 2012–2014: DAC Dunajská Streda (assistant coach)
- 2016: DAC Dunajská Streda
- * Club domestic league appearances and goals as of 25 March 2012

Krisztián Németh (born 5 April 1975) is a Slovak former footballer who last managed FC DAC 1904 Dunajská Streda.
