= Karim Coulibaly Diaby =

French-Ivorian footballer (born 1989)

Karim Coulibaly
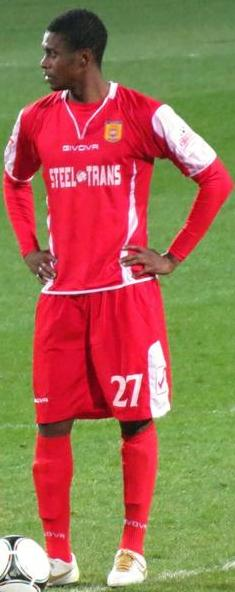

Personal information
- Full name: Karim Diaby Coulibaly
- Date of birth: 25 December 1989 (age 36)
- Place of birth: Abidjan, Ivory Coast
- Height: 1.85 m (6 ft 1 in)
- Position: Forward

Youth career
- Valenciennes

Senior career*
Years	Team	Apps	(Gls)
2007–2010	Valenciennes B		
2010	Arras		
2011–2014	Košice	55	(6)
2014	→ Karviná (loan)	3	(0)
2015–2017	Calais	36	(6)
2017–2018	Arras	21	(3)
2018–2023	US Maubeuge	55	(9)
Medal record
VSS Košice
Winner	Slovak Cup	2013–14
- * Club domestic league appearances and goals as of 10:08, 7 April 2026 (UTC)

Karim Diaby Coulibaly (born 25 December 1989) is an Ivorian former professional footballer who played as a forward.

== Career ==
Coulibaly was a youth player for Valenciennes B and played for the reserve team in the fourth and fifth tier of French football for three seasons. He spent the 2010–11 season with Arras.

=== MFK Košice ===
In March 2011, Coulibaly signed a professional contract with Košice, making his debut as a second half substitute in the 2–1 victory over Dukla Banská Bystrica on 2 April 2011. His first goal for the club was the only one in the 1–0 win against Žilina on 25 May that year. In February 2014, he was loaned briefly to Karviná.

=== French amateur football ===
At the end of his spell in Slovakia, Coulibaly returned to France, spending the 2015–16 and 2016–17 season with Calais in Championnat de France Amateur, before signing for a second time with Arras for the 2017–18 season.
