= Adrián Guľa =

Slovak footballer and manager

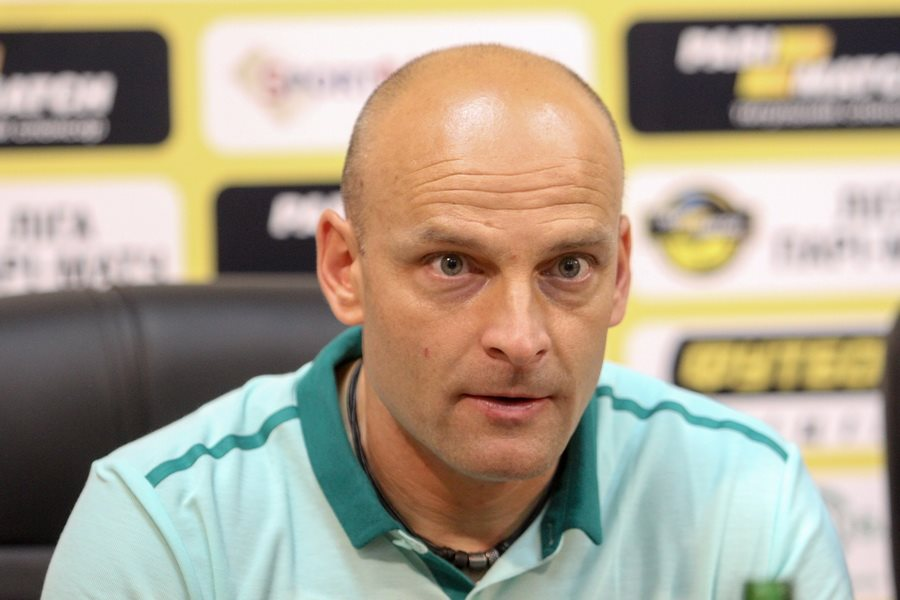
- Guľa as manager of Žilina in 2015

Personal information
- Date of birth: 29 June 1975 (age 51)
- Place of birth: Nováky, Czechoslovakia
- Height: 1.83 m (6 ft 0 in)

Team information
- Current team: Riga (manager)

Senior career*
Years	Team	Apps	(Gls)
- NCHZ Nováky
–2000	Prievidza		
2000–2002	Opava	53	(7)
2002–2004	Jablonec	31	(0)
2004–2006	Púchov	50	(4)
2006–2007	Viktoria Žižkov	15	(2)
2007–2008	Inter Bratislava		
2008–2009	Prievidza		

Managerial career
- 2009–2013: AS Trenčín
- 2013–2018: Žilina
- 2018–2019: Slovakia U21
- 2019–2021: Viktoria Plzeň
- 2021–2022: Wisła Kraków
- 2022–2023: DAC Dunajská Streda
- 2024: Apollon Limassol
- 2025–: Riga
- * Club domestic league appearances and goals

Adrián Guľa (born 29 June 1975) is a Slovak professional football manager and former player who manages Latvian club Riga.

He formerly managed teams including AS Trenčín, Viktoria Plzeň, and Wisła Kraków.

== Managerial career ==
In 2013, MŠK Žilina announced Guľa would become the club's new coach in the summer, replacing caretaker Štefan Tarkovič.

On 7 May 2018, Guľa was appointed as the Slovakia U21 head coach.

Following his departure from Slovakia U21s in 2019, Guľa took the helm as Viktoria Plzeň manager on 1 January 2020. He managed the club for 54 games before leaving the club in May 2021.

Guľa was announced as the manager of Wisła Kraków on 6 June 2021. After Wisła could only manage six wins in 21 league games under Guľa's management, he was dismissed on 13 February 2022.

In June 2024, Cypriot side Apollon Limassol announced the signing of Guľa on a two-season contract, in his first managerial position outside of Central Europe.

== Honours ==
Žilina

- Slovak First Football League: 2016–17

Riga

- Virslīga: 2025

Individual

- Slovak First Football League Manager of the Season: 2016–17
