= FK Slovan Nemšová =

Slovak football club

FKS Nemšová
- Full name: FK Slovan Nemšová
- Founded: 1928; 98 years ago
- Ground: Štadión Nemšová, Nemšová
- Capacity: 3,000
- Chairman: Pavol Chmelina
- Head coach: Ondrej Šmelko
- League: 3. liga
- 2012–13: 3. liga, 13th
Home colours

FK Slovan Nemšová is a Slovak football team, based in the town of Nemšová. The club was founded in 1928. The club played in the 3. Liga in the 2008–09 season. Slovan Nemšová plays its home games at the Štadión Nemšová which has a capacity of 3,000 spectators.

== Affiliated clubs ==
The following club is currently affiliated with FK Slovan Nemšová:

- (Slovakia) AS Trenčín (2012–present)

== Notable players ==
Had international caps for their respective countries. Players whose name is listed in bold represented their countries while playing for Slovan Nemšová.

- (Slovakia) Erik Prekop
- (Slovakia) Martin Fabuš
