= Jaroslav Kostelný =

Slovak footballer

Personal information
- Full name: Jaroslav Kostelný
- Date of birth: 19 April 1985 (age 41)
- Place of birth: Banská Bystrica, Czechoslovakia
- Height: 1.87 m (6 ft 2 in)
- Position: Centre back

Team information
- Current team: Podbrezová
- Number: 4

Youth career
- Partizán Čierny Balog
- Podbrezová

Senior career*
Years	Team	Apps	(Gls)
–2009	Podbrezová		
2010–2013	Ružomberok	63	(2)
2012–2013	→ Opava (loan)	17	(3)
2013–2014	Nitra	14	(1)
2014–2015	Ritzing	25	(0)
2015	Nitra	17	(0)
2016–	Podbrezová	57	(3)
- * Club domestic league appearances and goals as of 6 June 2018

Jaroslav Kostelný (born 19 April 1985) is a Slovak football defender who currently plays for the Fortuna Liga club FO ŽP Šport Podbrezová.
