= 2011–12 Slovak First Football League =

19th season of the Corgoň Liga

Corgoň Liga
- Season: 2011–12
- Dates: 15 July 2011 – 19 May 2012
- Champions: Žilina
- Promoted: Spartak Myjava
- Relegated: Dunajská Streda
- Champions League: Žilina
- Europa League: Spartak Trnava; Slovan Bratislava; Senica
- Matches: 198
- Goals: 454 (2.29 per match)
- Top goalscorer: Pavol Masaryk (18 goals)
- Biggest home win: B.Bystrica 4–0 Košice; Senica 4–0 Trenčín; Trenčín 4–0 Prešov; Ružomb. 4–0 Z.Moravce; Senica 4–0 Trenčín; Prešov 4–0 D.Streda; Senica 5–1 D.Streda
- Biggest away win: B.Bystrica 0–3 Trnava
- Highest scoring: Z.Moravce 3–5 Ružomb.
- Highest attendance: 8,482
- Average attendance: ▼2,171

The 2011–12 Slovak First Football League (known as Corgoň Liga due to sponsorship purposes) was the nineteenth season of the Corgoň Liga, the first-tier football league in Slovakia, since its establishment in 1993. It began on 15 July 2011 and was completed on 19 May 2012. Slovan Bratislava were the defending champions, having won their sixth Slovak league championship at the end of the 2010–11 season.

== Teams ==
Dubnica were relegated after finishing the 2010–11 season in 12th and last place, ending a 10-season stay in this competition. They were replaced by 2010–11 1. Liga champions AS Trenčín, who returned to the competition after a three-season absence.

Location of teams in Slovak Corgoň liga 2011–12

Team	Location	Stadium	Capacity
AS Trenčín	Trenčín	Štadión na Sihoti	4,500
DAC 1904	Dunajská Streda	Mestský štadión – DAC Dunajská Streda	3,170
Dukla Banská Bystrica	Banská Bystrica	SNP Stadium	10,000
MFK Košice	Košice	Štadión Lokomotívy v Čermeli	9,000
FC Nitra	Nitra	Štadión pod Zoborom	11,384
MFK Ružomberok	Ružomberok	Štadión MFK Ružomberok	4,817
FK Senica	Senica	Štadión FK Senica	4,600
Slovan Bratislava	Bratislava	Pasienky	12,000
Spartak Trnava	Trnava	Štadión Antona Malatinského	18,448
Tatran Prešov	Prešov	Tatran Štadión	5,410
ViOn Zlaté Moravce	Zlaté Moravce	Štadión FC ViOn	4,000
MŠK Žilina	Žilina	Stadium pod Dubňom	11,181

=== Personnel and kits ===
Note: Flags indicate national team as has been defined under FIFA eligibility rules. Players and Managers may hold more than one non-FIFA nationality.

Team	Manager^{1}	Captain	Kit manufacturer	Shirt sponsor
Dunajská Streda	(Germany) Werner Lorant	(Slovakia) Ján Marcin	Adidas	NEGIN
Trenčín	(Slovakia) Adrián Guľa	(Slovakia) Martin Ševela	Nike	Aegon
Dukla Banská Bystrica	(Slovakia) Štefan Zaťko	(Slovakia) Martin Poljovka	Adidas	Express Slovakia
Košice	(Slovakia) Ján Kozák	(Slovakia) Peter Šinglár	Givova	Steel Trans
Nitra	(Slovakia) Ladislav Jurkemik	(Slovakia) Miloš Šimončič	Jako	Bonul Security, El Comp, Špeciál Izotex
Ružomberok	(Czech Republic) Aleš Křeček	(Slovakia) Pavol Masaryk	Umbro	Mondi SCP
Senica	(Slovakia) Stanislav Griga	(Slovakia) Ján Gajdošík	Hummel	NAD RESS
Slovan Bratislava	(Slovakia) Vladimír Weiss	(Slovakia) Igor Žofčák	Adidas	Niké
Spartak Trnava	(Czech Republic) Pavel Hoftych	(Slovakia) Miroslav Karhan	Givova	TSS Grade
Tatran Prešov	(Ukraine) Serhiy Kovalets	(Slovakia) Ján Papaj	Adidas	IMPA
Zlaté Moravce	(Slovakia) Juraj Jarábek	(Slovakia) Pavol Majerník	Legea	ViOn
Žilina	(Netherlands) Frans Adelaar	(Slovakia) Miroslav Barčík	Nike	Preto

=== Managerial changes ===
Team	Outgoing manager	Manner of departure	Date of vacancy	Table	Incoming manager	Date of appointment
Spartak Trnava	(Slovakia) Peter Zelenský	End of caretaker spell	5 May 2011	Pre-season	(Czech Republic) Pavel Hoftych	19 May 2011
Dunajská Streda	(Slovakia) Mikuláš Radványi	End of contract	28 May 2011	Pre-season	(Slovakia) Štefan Horný	20 June 2011
Košice	(Slovakia) Štefan Tarkovič	Mutual agreement	1 June 2011	Pre-season	(Slovakia) Ladislav Šimčo	10 June 2011
Tatran Prešov	(Slovakia) Ladislav Pecko	End of contract	2 June 2011	Pre-season	(Slovakia) Štefan Tarkovič	4 June 2011
Žilina	(Czech Republic) Pavel Hapal	Sacked	16 July 2011	Pre-season	(Slovakia) Ľubomír Nosický	16 July 2011
Slovan Bratislava	(Czech Republic) Karel Jarolím	Mutual agreement	5 August 2011	4th	(Slovakia) Vladimír Weiss	5 August 2011
Dunajská Streda	(Slovakia) Štefan Horný	Resigned	6 August 2011	12th	(Slovakia) Krisztián Németh	7 August 2011
Ružomberok	(Slovakia) Ladislav Jurkemik	Sacked	22 September 2011	8th	(Czech Republic) Aleš Křeček	22 September 2011
Nitra	(Slovakia) Cyril Stachura	Sacked	19 November 2011	7th	(Slovakia) Róbert Barborík	20 November 2011
Nitra	(Slovakia) Róbert Barborík	End of caretaker spell	20 December 2011	7th	(Slovakia) Ladislav Jurkemik	20 December 2011
Tatran Prešov	(Slovakia) Štefan Tarkovič	Sacked	19 January 2012	11th	(Ukraine) Serhiy Kovalets	19 January 2012
Dunajská Streda	(Slovakia) Krisztián Németh	Mutual agreement	25 March 2012	12th	(Germany) Werner Lorant	25 March 2012
Žilina	(Slovakia) Ľubomír Nosický	Sacked	16 April 2012	1st	(Netherlands) Frans Adelaar	16 April 2012
Košice	(Slovakia) Ladislav Šimčo	Sacked	30 April 2012	12th	(Slovakia) Ján Kozák	30 April 2012

== League table ==
Pos	Team	Pld	W	D	L	GF	GA	GD	Pts	Qualification or relegation
1	Žilina (C)	33	19	10	4	52	27	+25	67	Qualification for Champions League second qualifying round
2	Spartak Trnava	33	19	8	6	44	22	+22	65	Qualification for Europa League second qualifying round
3	Slovan Bratislava	33	16	11	6	48	35	+13	59	Qualification for Europa League second qualifying round
4	Senica	33	15	12	6	47	23	+24	57	Qualification for Europa League first qualifying round (Note: Since 2011–12 Slovak Cup winners Žilina qualified for the 2012–13 UEFA Champions League, so cup runners-up Senica qualified for the 2012–13 UEFA Europa League first qualifying round. Moreover, Slovan Bratislava were moved up a round as the cup winner spot was not used.)
5	Trenčín	33	12	12	9	51	49	+2	48	
6	Ružomberok	33	11	11	11	39	34	+5	44	
7	ViOn Zlaté Moravce	33	11	8	14	34	43	−9	41	
8	Nitra	33	9	12	12	33	39	−6	39	
9	Dukla Banská Bystrica	33	9	10	14	37	44	−7	37	
10	Tatran Prešov	33	7	12	14	23	35	−12	33	
11	Košice	33	6	11	16	25	40	−15	29	
12	DAC Dunajská Streda (R)	33	5	1	27	21	63	−42	16	Relegation to 2. liga

Source: Kicker (in German)
Rules for classification: 1) points; 2) goal difference; 3) number of goals scored.
(C) Champions; (R) Relegated

== Results ==
The schedule consisted of three rounds. The two first rounds consisted of a conventional home and away round-robin schedule. The pairings of the third round were set according to the 2010–11 final standings. Every team played each opponent once for a total of 11 games per team.

=== First and second round ===
Home \ Away	DAC	BB	KOŠ	NIT	RUŽ	SEN	SLO	TRN	PRE	TRE	ZLM	ŽIL
DAC Dunajská Streda		1–3	0–1	0–2	0–2	0–1	1–0	0–1	0–0	2–0	0–2	2–1
Dukla Banská Bystrica	1–0		4–0	1–2	2–0	1–1	1–2	0–3	2–0	2–0	0–1	1–3
Košice	3–0	3–1		0–2	1–1	0–1	0–1	1–1	1–0	1–2	1–1	1–2
Nitra	2–0	2–2	1–1		2–3	0–0	0–1	1–3	2–2	0–0	0–1	0–2
Ružomberok	3–1	2–0	1–1	0–0		0–1	1–0	0–0	1–1	1–1	4–0	1–2
Senica	3–0	0–0	0–1	3–1	2–1		2–2	1–1	3–0	4–0	1–0	1–2
Slovan Bratislava	3–1	3–2	2–1	0–0	2–0	3–2		2–1	2–0	3–1	0–0	2–1
Spartak Trnava	2–1	3–1	1–0	1–2	0–2	1–1	2–0		0–0	1–0	1–0	1–1
Prešov	0–2	0–1	0–1	1–1	1–1	0–1	0–1	2–0		1–0	0–1	0–0
Trenčín	1–0	2–2	4–1	0–0	1–1	0–1	2–2	4–2	4–0		3–1	3–3
ViOn Zlaté Moravce	2–1	1–0	3–2	1–1	1–0	0–0	1–1	0–1	1–2	3–0		1–1
Žilina	2–0	3–1	1–1	2–0	2–1	3–1	2–1	0–1	1–0	0–0	2–2	

Source: Kicker (in German)
Legend: Blue = home team win; Yellow = draw; Red = away team win.

=== Third round ===
Key numbers for pairing determination (number marks position in 2010–11 final standings):

23rd round	24th round	25th round	26th round	27th round	28th round
1–12	1–2	2–12	1–4	3–12	1–6
2–11	8–6	3–1	2–3	4–2	2–5
3–10	9–5	4–11	9–7	5–1	3–4
4–9	10–4	5–10	10–6	6–11	10–8
5–8	11–3	6–9	11–5	7–10	11–7
6–7	12–7	7–8	12–8	8–9	12–9

29th round	30th round	31st round	32nd round	33rd round
4–12	1–8	5–12	1–10	6–12
5–3	2–7	6–4	2–9	7–5
6–2	3–6	7–3	3–8	8–4
7–1	4–5	8–2	4–7	9–3
8–11	11–9	9–1	5–6	10–2
9–10	12–10	10–11	12–11	11–1

Home \ Away	DAC	BB	KOŠ	NIT	RUŽ	SEN	SLO	TRN	PRE	TRE	ZLM	ŽIL
DAC Dunajská Streda		1–2	2–0		0–1		2–3					0–2
Dukla Banská Bystrica			0–0	1–1			1–1			1–2	0–0	2–1
Košice				1–2		0–0		0–1	0–0		0–1	
Nitra	3–0					1–0		0–2	0–1		1–0	
Ružomberok		2–0	2–0	1–1			0–0					0–1
Senica	5–1	0–0			2–0				0–0	4–0		1–1
Slovan Bratislava			1–1	2–1		2–2		0–0		2–2	3–0	
Spartak Trnava	3–0	2–0			3–0	1–0			1–0	2–2		
Prešov	4–0	2–2			1–1		2–1					1–1
Trenčín	2–1		1–1	5–2	2–1				2–0			
ViOn Zlaté Moravce	3–2				3–5	1–3		0–2	1–2	2–3		
Žilina			1–0	2–0			3–0	1–0		2–2	1–0	

Source: Kicker (in German)
Legend: Blue = home team win; Yellow = draw; Red = away team win.

== Top scorers ==
Rank	Player	Club	Goals
1	(Slovakia) Pavol Masaryk	Ružomberok	18
2	(Slovakia) Juraj Halenár	Slovan Bratislava	15
3	(Trinidad and Tobago) Lester Peltier	Trenčín	11
4	(Slovakia) Martin Jakubko	Dukla Banská Bystrica	10
4	(Slovakia) Róbert Pich	Žilina	10
6	(Slovakia) Tomáš Majtán	Žilina	9
6	(Czech Republic) Martin Vyskočil	Spartak Trnava	9
8	(Republic of the Congo) John Delarge	Dunajská Streda	8
8	(Argentina) David Depetris	Trenčín	8
10	(Slovakia) Miroslav Barčík	Žilina	6
10	(Slovakia) Filip Hlohovský	Trenčín	6
10	(Czech Republic) Martin Hruška	Zlaté Moravce	6
10	(Slovakia) Erik Pačinda	Košice	6
10	(Slovakia) Ladislav Tomaček	Spartak Trnava	6

== Awards ==
=== Top Eleven ===
- Goalkeeper: (Czech Republic) Petr Bolek (FK Senica)
- Defence: (Ivory Coast) Mamadou Bagayoko (ŠK Slovan), (Slovakia) Jozef Piaček (MŠK Žilina), (Argentina) Nicolas Ezequiel Gorosito (FK Senica), (South Africa) Ricardo Nunes (MŠK Žilina)
- Midfield: (Slovakia) Miroslav Karhan (Spartak Trnava), (Trinidad and Tobago) Lester Peltier (AS Trenčín), (Slovakia) Tomáš Kóňa (FK Senica), (Serbia) Marko Milinković (ŠK Slovan)
- Attack: (Slovakia) Pavol Masaryk (MFK Ružomberok), (Slovakia) Tomáš Majtán (MŠK Žilina)

=== Individual awards ===
Manager of the season Stanislav Griga (FK Senica)

Player of the Year Miroslav Karhan (Spartak Trnava)

Young player of the Year Norbert Gyömbér (Dukla Banská Bystrica)

== Attendances ==
#	Club	Average
1	Trnava	5,051
2	Žilina	2,993
3	Trenčín	2,586
4	Slovan	2,518
5	Ružomberok	1,921
6	ViOn	1,861
7	Dukla	1,730
8	Tatran	1,653
9	DAC	1,527
10	Senica	1,485
11	Nitra	1,468
12	Košice	1,248

== See also ==
- 2011–12 Slovak Cup
- 2011–12 2. Liga (Slovakia)
