= 2009–10 Slovak First League =

1. liga
- Season: 2009–10
- Champions: FC ViOn Zlaté Moravce
- Promoted: FC ViOn Zlaté Moravce
- Relegated: FK Mesto Prievidza; ŽP ŠPORT Podbrezová
- Matches: 135
- Goals: 329 (2.44 per match)
- Top goalscorer: Karol Pavelka (16 goals)

The 2009–10 Slovak First League season was the 17th edition of the Slovak First League (also known as 1. liga) annual football tournament. It began in late July 2009 and ended in May 2010.

== Team changes from 2008–09 ==
- Promoted in Corgoň Liga: ↑Senica×↑
- Relegated from Corgoň Liga: ↓Zlaté Moravce↓
- Promoted in 1. liga: ↑Púchov↑, ↑Dolný Kubín↑, ↑Liptovský Mikuláš↑
- Relegated from 1. liga: ↓Humenné↓, ↓Košice ↓, ↓Dunajská Streda ↓

× - Senica merged with Inter Bratislava

=== Stadia and locations ===
Location of teams in Slovak First League 2009–10

== League table ==
| Pos | Team | Pld | W | D | L | GF | GA | GD | Pts | Promotion or relegation |
|---|---|---|---|---|---|---|---|---|---|---|
| 1 | Zlaté Moravce (C, P) | 27 | 18 | 5 | 4 | 54 | 21 | +33 | 59 | Promotion to Corgoň Liga |
| 2 | Trenčín | 27 | 13 | 11 | 3 | 53 | 21 | +32 | 50 | |
| 3 | Púchov | 27 | 15 | 5 | 7 | 38 | 31 | +7 | 50 | |
| 4 | Lučenec | 27 | 10 | 8 | 9 | 36 | 28 | +8 | 38 | |
| 5 | Dolný Kubín | 27 | 10 | 7 | 10 | 39 | 31 | +8 | 37 | |
| 6 | Zemplín Michalovce | 27 | 8 | 6 | 13 | 23 | 33 | −10 | 30 | |
| 7 | Ružomberok B | 27 | 8 | 5 | 14 | 23 | 45 | −22 | 29 | |
| 8 | Rimavská Sobota | 27 | 7 | 7 | 13 | 21 | 36 | −15 | 28 | |
| 9 | Liptovský Mikuláš | 27 | 7 | 5 | 15 | 27 | 42 | −15 | 26 | |
| 10 | Šaľa | 27 | 4 | 11 | 12 | 15 | 41 | −26 | 23 | |
| 11 | Prievidza (Note: Withdrew from league) (R) | 19 | 4 | 6 | 9 | 13 | 26 | −13 | 18 | Relegation to 2. liga |
| 12 | Podbrezová (R) | 5 | 2 | 1 | 2 | 5 | 5 | 0 | 7 | Relegation to 2. liga |

Source: RSSSF.org
Rules for classification: 1) points; 2) goal difference; 3) number of goals scored.
(C) Champions; (P) Promoted; (R) Relegated

== Top goalscorers ==
| Rank | Player | Club | Goals |
|---|---|---|---|
| 1 | (Slovakia) Karol Pavelka | Zlaté Moravce | 16 |
| 2 | (Slovakia) Peter Kuračka | Zlaté Moravce | 13 |
| 3 | (Slovakia) Patrik Čarnota | Dolný Kubín | 11 |
| 4 | (Ukraine) Ruslan Lyubarskyi | Michalovce | 9 |
| 5 | (Slovakia) Martin Luhový | Púchov | 8 |
| 6 | (Slovakia) Dušan Sninský | Michalovce | 7 |
| 6 | (Paraguay) Jorge Salinas | Trenčín | 7 |
| 6 | (Slovakia) Filip Hlohovský | Trenčín | 7 |

== See also ==
- 2009–10 Slovak Superliga
