= 2010–11 Slovak First League =

1. liga
- Season: 2010–11
- Champions: FK AS Trenčín
- Promoted: FK AS Trenčín
- Relegated: FK Slovan Duslo Šaľa; FK Púchov
- Matches: 198
- Goals: 520 (2.63 per match)
- Top goalscorer: David Depetris (31 goals)

The 2010–11 season of the Slovak First League (also known as 1. liga) was the eighteenth season of the second-tier football league in Slovakia, since its establishment in 1993. It began in late July 2010 and ended in May 2011.
From the next season was this league renamed to Slovak Second Football League (2. liga).

== Team changes from 2009–10 ==
- Promoted in Corgoň Liga: ↑Zlaté Moravce↑
- Relegated from Corgoň Liga: ↓Petržalka↓
- Promoted in 1. liga: ↑Senec↑, ↑Moldava nad Bodvou↑
- Relegated from 1. liga: ↓Prievidza×↓, ↓Podbrezová×↓

× - withdrew from league

=== Stadiums and locations ===
Location of teams in Slovak First League 2010–11

Team	Location	Stadium	Capacity
AS Trenčín	Trenčín	Štadión na Sihoti	3,500
FC Petržalka	Petržalka	Štadión Rapid	3,000
FK Bodva	Moldava	Steel Slovakia aréna	2,500
Tatran Liptovský Mikuláš	Liptovský Mikuláš	Stadium Liptovský Mikuláš	1,950
SFM Senec	Senec	Národné tréningové centrum	3,264
LAFC Lučenec	Lučenec	Štadión v parku	5,000
Zemplín Michalovce	Michalovce	Štadión MFK	4,500
MFK Dolný Kubín	Dolný Kubín	Stadium MUDr. Ivan Chodák	1,950
MŠK Rimavská Sobota	Rimavská Sobota	Na Záhradkách	5,000
Duslo Šaľa	Šaľa	Štadión v Šali	5,000
FK Púchov	Púchov	Štadión FK Púchov	6,614
MFK Ružomberok B	Ružomberok	Štadión pod Čebraťom	4,817

== League table ==
Pos	Team	Pld	W	D	L	GF	GA	GD	Pts	Promotion or relegation
1	Trenčín (C, P)	33	22	6	5	77	30	+47	72	Promotion to Corgoň Liga
2	Rimavská Sobota	33	16	6	11	41	35	+6	54	
3	Petržalka	33	13	12	8	55	36	+19	51	
4	Zemplín Michalovce	33	15	6	12	51	48	+3	51	
5	SFM Senec	33	13	9	11	39	39	0	48	
6	Liptovský Mikuláš	33	14	6	13	43	44	−1	48	
7	Moldava	33	13	8	12	46	40	+6	47	
8	Dolný Kubín	33	13	7	13	45	38	+7	46	
9	Lučenec	33	11	8	14	41	48	−7	41	
10	Ružomberok B	33	10	8	15	37	44	−7	38	
11	Šaľa (R)	33	9	6	18	24	44	−20	33	Relegation to 3. liga
12	Púchov (R)	33	6	4	23	24	77	−53	22	Relegation to 3. liga

Source: LIGA.cz (in Czech)
Rules for classification: 1) points; 2) goal difference; 3) number of goals scored.
(C) Champions; (P) Promoted; (R) Relegated

== Top goalscorers ==
Rank	Player	Club	Goals
1	(Argentina) David Depetris	Trenčín	31
2	(Slovakia) Filip Serečin	Michalovce	17
3	(Slovakia) Tomáš Chovanec	Ružomberok B	15
4	(Slovakia) Radoslav Augustín	Petržalka	14
4	(Slovakia) Tomáš Gavlák	Moldava	14
6	(Slovakia) Ladislav Belkovics	SFM Senec	13
7	(Slovakia) Richard Chorvatovič	SFM Senec	12
8	(Nigeria) Fanendo Adi	Trenčín	11
9	(Slovakia) Milan Bezák	Liptovský Mikuláš	10
10	(Slovakia) Dominik Kunca	Michalovce	9
10	(Slovakia) Ján Jurky	Dolný Kubín	9

== See also ==
- 2010–11 Slovak Superliga
- 2010–11 Slovak Second League
