= 2010–11 MŠK Žilina season =

Žilina
2010–11 season
- Manager: Pavel Hapal
- Stadium: Štadión pod Dubňom
- Slovak Superliga: 3rd
- Slovak Cup: Runners-up
- Slovak Super Cup: Winners
- UEFA Champions League: Group stage
Home colours

The 2010–11 season was MŠK Žilina's 17th consecutive season in the Slovak Superliga and 102nd year in existence as a football club. In addition to the domestic league, Žilina participated in that season's editions of the Slovak Cup, the Slovak Super Cup and the UEFA Champions League.

== Squad ==
Note: Flags indicate national team as defined under FIFA eligibility rules; some limited exceptions apply. Players may hold more than one non-FIFA nationality.

| No. | Pos. | Nation | Player |
|---|---|---|---|
| 2 | DF | SVK | Stanislav Angelovič |
| 5 | DF | SVK | Ľubomír Guldan |
| 6 | MF | SVK | Patrik Mráz |
| 7 | DF | SVK | Vladimír Leitner |
| 8 | DF | SVK | Marcel Ondráš |
| 9 | MF | CZE | Emil Rilke |
| 10 | FW | SVK | Tomáš Majtán |
| 11 | FW | NED | Wim Bokila |
| 14 | MF | LAT | Artūrs Zjuzins |
| 15 | DF | SVK | Jozef Piaček |
| 17 | FW | SVK | Róbert Pich |
| 18 | FW | GAM | Momodou Ceesay |
| 19 | FW | SVK | Dominik Fótyik |

| No. | Pos. | Nation | Player |
|---|---|---|---|
| 21 | MF | SVK | Pavol Poliacek |
| 22 | GK | SVK | Martin Krnáč |
| 23 | DF | CZE | Ondřej Šourek |
| 26 | GK | SVK | Patrik Le Giang |
| 27 | MF | SVK | Štefan Zošák |
| 28 | FW | BEN | Babatounde Bello |
| 29 | DF | BEN | Prince Ofori |
| 30 | GK | SVK | Martin Dúbravka |
| 39 | FW | SVK | Ivan Lietava |
| 42 | MF | SVK | Roman Gergel |
| 45 | DF | CMR | Ernest Mabouka |
| 66 | MF | SVK | Zdeno Štrba |

== Competitions ==
=== Overview ===
| Competition | First match | Last match | Starting round | Final position | Record | | | | | | | |
| Competition | First match | Last match | Starting round | Final position | Pld | W | D | L | GF | GA | GD | Win % |
|---|---|---|---|---|---|---|---|---|---|---|---|---|
| Slovak Superliga | 17 July 2010 | 25 May 2011 | Matchday 1 | 3rd | 33 | 14 | 12 | 7 | 47 | 28 | +19 | 42.42 |
| Slovak Cup | 21 September 2010 | 8 May 2011 | Second round | Runners-up | 7 | 5 | 1 | 1 | 18 | 5 | +13 | 71.43 |
| Slovak Super Cup | 4 July 2010 | | Final | Winners | 1 | 0 | 1 | 0 | 1 | 1 | +0 | 0.00 |
| UEFA Champions League | 13 July 2010 | 8 December 2010 | Second qualifying round | Group stage | 12 | 4 | 1 | 7 | 13 | 22 | −9 | 33.33 |
| Total | | | | | 53 | 23 | 15 | 15 | 79 | 56 | +23 | 43.40 |

Source: Competitions

=== Slovak Super Cup ===
| 4 July 2010 Final | Žilina | 1–1 (4–2 p) | Slovan Bratislava | Bratislava |
| 18:00 CEST (UTC+2) | Mráz (yellow card) 45'; Zošák 49' | Report | Halenár 47'; Dosoudil (yellow card) 62' | Stadium: Pasienky; Attendance: 1,237; Referee: Pavol Chmura |
| | Penalties |
| | Majtán (penalty scored); Bello (penalty missed); Angelovič (penalty scored); Leitner (penalty scored); Jež (penalty scored) | | (penalty scored) Halenár; (penalty scored) Dosoudil; (penalty missed) Dobrotka; (penalty missed) Grendel |
Note: Žilina won 4–2 on penalties.

=== Slovak Superliga ===
==== League table ====
| Pos | Team | Pld | W | D | L | GF | GA | GD | Pts | Qualification or relegation |
|---|---|---|---|---|---|---|---|---|---|---|
| 1 | Slovan Bratislava (C) | 33 | 20 | 8 | 5 | 63 | 22 | +41 | 68 | Qualification for Champions League second qualifying round |
| 2 | Senica | 33 | 18 | 7 | 8 | 54 | 30 | +24 | 61 | Qualification for Europa League third qualifying round (Note: Slovan Bratislava, winners of the 2010–11 Slovak Cup, qualified for the Champions League. Since cup runners-up MŠK Žilina are also already assured of a top-four finish, the distribution of all three Europa League spots (both regular spots plus the cup winners' spot) effectively reverted to league placement.) |
| 3 | Žilina | 33 | 14 | 12 | 7 | 47 | 28 | +19 | 54 | Qualification for Europa League second qualifying round |
| 4 | Spartak Trnava | 33 | 13 | 10 | 10 | 40 | 30 | +10 | 49 | Qualification for Europa League first qualifying round |
| 5 | Dukla Banská Bystrica | 33 | 13 | 9 | 11 | 39 | 32 | +7 | 48 | |

Source: Kicker (in German)
Rules for classification: 1) points; 2) goal difference; 3) number of goals scored.
(C) Champions

==== Results summary ====
| Overall | | | | | | | | Home | | | | | | Away | | | | | |
| Pld | W | D | L | GF | GA | GD | Pts | W | D | L | GF | GA | GD | W | D | L | GF | GA | GD |
|---|---|---|---|---|---|---|---|---|---|---|---|---|---|---|---|---|---|---|---|
| 33 | 14 | 12 | 7 | 47 | 28 | +19 | 54 | 8 | 7 | 2 | 25 | 15 | +10 | 6 | 5 | 5 | 22 | 13 | +9 |

Source: Competitions

==== Matches ====
| 17 July 2010 1 | Žilina | 2–1 | ViOn Zlaté Moravce | Žilina |
| 17:30 CEST (UTC+2) | Majtán 47'; Oravec 82' | Report | Kuračka 10' | Stadium: Štadión pod Dubňom; Referee: Ivan Kružliak |

| 24 July 2010 2 | Žilina | 2–2 | Slovan Bratislava | Žilina |
| 19:30 CEST (UTC+2) | Oravec 47'; Lietava 79' | Report | Bagayoko 7'; Božić 25' | Stadium: Štadión pod Dubňom; Referee: Robert Horvath (Hungary) |

| 31 July 2010 3 | Dukla Banská Bystrica | 1–2 | Žilina | Banská Bystrica |
| 17:30 CEST (UTC+2) | Pich 66' | Report | Zošák 62'; Ceesay 82' | Stadium: SNP Stadium; Referee: Vladimír Hracho |

| 7 August 2010 4 | Žilina | 5–1 | Nitra | Žilina |
| 19:30 CEST (UTC+2) | Zošák 16' (pen.); Bello 18', 33'; Šourek 75'; Fótyik 88' | Report | Šimončič 82' | Stadium: Štadión pod Dubňom; Referee: Miroslav Fajčík |

| 13 August 2010 5 | Ružomberok | 1–1 | Žilina | Ružomberok |
| 17:30 CEST (UTC+2) | Hoferica 45' | Report | Majtán 88' | Stadium: Štadión MFK Ružomberok; Referee: Jozef Pavlík |

| 21 August 2010 6 | Žilina | 0–0 | Senica | Žilina |
| 19:30 CEST (UTC+2) | | Report | | Stadium: Štadión pod Dubňom; Referee: Richard Trutz |

| 28 August 2010 7 | Spartak Trnava | 0–0 | Žilina | Trnava |
| 19:30 CEST (UTC+2) | | Report | | Stadium: Štadión Antona Malatinského; Referee: Jozef Pavlík |

| 11 September 2010 8 | Žilina | 2–1 | Tatran Prešov | Žilina |
| 17:30 CEST (UTC+2) | Jež 14'; Vladavić 44' (pen.) | Report | Piter-Bučko 46' | Stadium: Štadión pod Dubňom; Referee: Pavol Šuniar |

| 18 September 2010 9 | Dubnica | 2–5 | Žilina | Dubnica nad Váhom |
| 19:30 CEST (UTC+2) | Grabež 48'; Bruško 68' (pen.) | Report | Jež 26'; Majtán 41', 65'; Vittor 58'; Oravec 64' | Stadium: Mestský štadión Referee: Richard Trutz |

| 24 September 2010 10 | Žilina | 0–0 | DAC Dunajská Streda | Žilina |
| 17:30 CEST (UTC+2) | | Report | | Stadium: Štadión pod Dubňom; Referee: Pavol Chmura |

| 2 October 2010 11 | Košice | 0–4 | Žilina | Košice |
| 15:30 CEST (UTC+2) | | Report | Ceesay 26'; Majtán 41'; Vladavić 54'; Pečalka 90' | Stadium: Štadión Lokomotívy v Čermeli; Referee: Vladimír Vnuk |

| 15 October 2010 12 | ViOn Zlaté Moravce | 0–4 | Žilina | Zlaté Moravce |
| 17:00 CEST (UTC+2) | | Report | Majtán 16', 19', 76', (yellow card) 32'; Zošák 74' | Stadium: Štadión FC ViOn; Referee: Jozef Pavlík |

| 23 October 2010 13 | Slovan Bratislava | 0–1 | Žilina | Bratislava |
| 18:30 CEST (UTC+2) | | Report | Majtán 67' | Stadium: Pasienky; Referee: Pavel Olšiak |

| 29 October 2010 14 | Žilina | 3–3 | Dukla Banská Bystrica | Žilina |
| 19:30 CEST (UTC+2) | Oravec 9', 54', 67' | Report | Hesek 11', 40'; Uškovič 77' | Stadium: Štadión pod Dubňom; Referee: Pavol Chmura |

| 6 November 2010 15 | Nitra | 0–2 | Žilina | Nitra |
| 15:30 CET (UTC+1) | | Report | Oravec 14'; Jež 51' | Stadium: Štadión pod Zoborom; Referee: Ivan Kružliak |

| 13 November 2010 16 | Žilina | 3–1 | Ružomberok | Žilina |
| 17:30 CET (UTC+1) | Kostelný 29' (o.g.); Vladavić 57'; Oravec 74' | Report | Chovanec 28' | Stadium: Štadión pod Dubňom; Referee: Patrik Hrčka |

| 19 November 2010 17 | Senica | 2–1 | Žilina | Senica |
| 18:00 CET (UTC+1) | Diviš 65'; Smetana 80' | Report | Oravec 54' | Stadium: Štadión FK Senica; Referee: Jozef Pavlík |

| 28 November 2010 18 | Žilina | 1–1 | Spartak Trnava | Žilina |
| 14:30 CET (UTC+1) | Oravec 78' | Report | Koné 17' (pen.) | Stadium: Štadión pod Dubňom; Referee: Roman Matúš |

| 26 February 2011 19 | Tatran Prešov | 2–0 | Žilina | Prešov |
| 15:30 CET (UTC+1) | Krajník 6'; Macko 78' (pen.) | Report | | Stadium: Štadión Tatranu; Referee: Vladimír Vnuk |

| 5 March 2011 20 | Žilina | 0–0 | Dubnica | Žilina |
| 15:30 CET (UTC+1) | | Report | | Stadium: Štadión pod Dubňom; Referee: Pavol Chmura |

| 11 March 2011 21 | DAC Dunajská Streda | 2–2 | Žilina | Dunajská Streda |
| 17:30 CET (UTC+1) | Tomčák 24', 78' | Report | Lietava 65'; Majtán 74' | Stadium: DAC Stadion; Referee: Pavel Olšiak |

| 15 March 2011 22 | Žilina | 2–0 | Košice | Žilina |
| 15:30 CET (UTC+1) | Zjuzins 59'; Lietava 69' | Report | | Stadium: Štadión pod Dubňom; Referee: Roman Matúš |

| 19 March 2011 23 | Žilina | 1–0 | ViOn Zlaté Moravce | Žilina |
| 15:30 CET (UTC+1) | Bello 50' | Report | | Stadium: Štadión pod Dubňom; Referee: Richard Trutz |

| 1 April 2011 24 | Žilina | 0–3 | Slovan Bratislava | Žilina |
| 17:30 CEST (UTC+2) | | Report | | Stadium: Štadión pod Dubňom; Referee: Pavol Chmura |

| 9 April 2011 25 | Dukla Banská Bystrica | 0–0 | Žilina | Banská Bystrica |
| 15:30 CEST (UTC+2) | | Report | | Stadium: SNP Stadium; Referee: Michal Smolák |

| 16 April 2011 26 | Žilina | 2–0 | Nitra | Žilina |
| 17:30 CEST (UTC+2) | Majtán 18'; Gergel 25' | Report | | Stadium: Štadión pod Dubňom; Referee: Pavel Olšiak |

| 23 April 2011 27 | Ružomberok | 0–0 | Žilina | Ružomberok |
| 17:30 CEST (UTC+2) | | Report | | Stadium: Štadión MFK Ružomberok; Referee: Vladimír Hracho |

| 29 April 2011 28 | Žilina | 0–1 | Senica | Žilina |
| 17:30 CEST (UTC+2) | | Report | Kóňa 80' | Stadium: Štadión pod Dubňom; Referee: Mário Vlk |

| 4 May 2011 29 | Spartak Trnava | 1–0 | Žilina | Trnava |
| 17:30 CEST (UTC+2) | Koné 41' | Report | | Stadium: Štadión Antona Malatinského; Referee: Jozef Pavlík |

| 11 May 2011 30 | Žilina | 2–1 | Tatran Prešov | Žilina |
| 17:30 CEST (UTC+2) | Pich 34'; Angelovič 90+1' | Report | Meszároš 53' | Stadium: Štadión pod Dubňom; Referee: Peter Kráľovič |

| 14 May 2011 31 | Dubnica | 1–0 | Žilina | Dubnica nad Váhom |
| 17:30 CEST (UTC+2) | Šulek 4' | Report | | Stadium: Mestský štadión Referee: Michal Smolák |

| 21 May 2011 32 | Žilina | 0–0 | DAC Dunajská Streda | Žilina |
| 17:30 CEST (UTC+2) | | Report | | Stadium: Štadión pod Dubňom; Referee: Dušan Sedlák |

| 25 May 2011 33 | Košice | 1–0 | Žilina | Košice |
| 17:30 CEST (UTC+2) | Coulibaly 50' | Report | | Stadium: Štadión Lokomotívy v Čermeli; Referee: Ľubomír Samotný |

=== Slovak Cup ===
| 21 September 2010 Second round | Vranov nad Topľou | 0–5 | Žilina | Vranov nad Topľou |
| 16:00 CEST (UTC+2) | | Report | | Stadium: Stadium MFK Vranov nad Topľou |

| 26 October 2010 Third round | SFM Senec | 1–3 | Žilina | Senec |
| 18:00 CEST (UTC+2) | M. Urda 47' | Report | Vittor 33'; Ceesay 40'; Mráz 57' | Stadium: NTC Senec |

==== Quarter-finals ====
| 10 November 2010 First leg | Tatran Liptovský Mikuláš | 0–1 | Žilina | Liptovský Mikuláš |
| 14:00 CET (UTC+1) | | Report | Kapláň 4' (o.g.) | Stadium: Stadium Liptovský Mikuláš; Referee: Dušan Sedlák |

| 1 December 2010 Second leg | Žilina | 3–0 (4–0 agg.) | Tatran Liptovský Mikuláš | Žilina |
| 14:00 CET (UTC+1) | Poliacek 20'; Jež 45'; Majtán 46' | Report | | Stadium: Štadión pod Dubňom; Referee: Vladimír Vnuk |
Note: Žilina won 4–0 on aggregate.

==== Semi-finals ====
| 5 April 2011 First leg | Žilina | 3–0 | ViOn Zlaté Moravce | Žilina |
| 16:30 CEST (UTC+2) | Ceesay 29', 50'; Majtán 70' (pen.) | Report | | Stadium: Štadión pod Dubňom; Referee: Ivan Kružliak |

| 19 April 2011 Second leg | ViOn Zlaté Moravce | 1–0 (1–3 agg.) | Žilina | Zlaté Moravce |
| 17:30 CEST (UTC+2) | Janečka 11' | Report | | Stadium: Štadión FC ViOn; Referee: Dušan Sedlák |
Note: Žilina won 3–1 on aggregate.

==== Final ====
| 8 May 2011 Final | Slovan Bratislava | 3–3 (a.e.t.) (5–4 p) | Žilina | Banská Bystrica |
| 13:30 CEST (UTC+2) | Guldan 7' (o.g.); Božić (yellow card) 45'; Šebo 76', 113'; Grendel (yellow card) 107' | Report | Zošák 15'; Majtán (yellow card) 20'; Lietava 40'; Ceesay (yellow card) 56'; Mráz 120+1' | Stadium: SNP Stadium; Attendance: 2,653; Referee: Pavel Královec (Czech Republic) |
| | Penalties |
| | Šebo (penalty missed); Žofčák (penalty scored); Grendel (penalty scored); Hrdlička (penalty scored); Guédé (penalty scored); Dobrotka (penalty missed); Dosoudil (penalty scored) | | (penalty scored) Mráz; (penalty scored) Guldan; (penalty scored) Pich; (penalty missed) Šourek; (penalty scored) Lietava; (penalty missed) Ceesay; (penalty missed) Gergel |

=== UEFA Champions League ===
==== Qualifying rounds ====
===== Second qualifying round =====
| 13 July 2010 First leg | Birkirkara (Malta) | 1–0 | (Slovakia) Žilina | Ta' Qali, Malta |
| 18:00 CEST (UTC+2) | Vukanac 1'; A. De Cesare (yellow card) 15'; K. Pulo (yellow card) 65'; E. Lovizon (yellow card) 68'; A. Buhagiar (yellow card) 69'; Zerafa (yellow card) 77' | Report | Piaček (yellow card) 33'; Šourek (yellow card) 45+2'; Mráz (yellow card) 56'; Angelovič (yellow card) 90+4' | Stadium: Centenary Stadium; Attendance: 600; Referee: Simon Lee Evans (Wales) |

| 21 July 2010 Second leg | Žilina (Slovakia) | 3–0 (3–1 agg.) | (Malta) Birkirkara | Žilina, Slovakia |
| 19:30 CEST (UTC+2) | Piaček 21'; Lietava (yellow card) 45', (goal) 77'; Angelovič (yellow card) 73'; Oravec 90+2' | Report | Galea (yellow card) 37'; A. Buhagiar (yellow card) 81'; Fenech (yellow card) 83' | Stadium: Štadión pod Dubňom; Attendance: 5,511; Referee: Zsolt Szabó (Hungary) |
Note: Žilina won 3–1 on aggregate.

===== Third qualifying round =====
| 27 July 2010 First leg | Litex Lovech (Bulgaria) | 1–1 | (Slovakia) Žilina | Lovech, Bulgaria |
| 20:00 EEST (UTC+3) | Barthe (yellow card) 71'; Tom 78'; Nikolov (yellow card) 87' | Report | Oravec (yellow card) 52'; Piaček (yellow card) 58'; Majtán 65' | Stadium: Lovech Stadium; Attendance: 5,920; Referee: Kristinn Jakobsson (Iceland) |

| 4 August 2010 Second leg | Žilina (Slovakia) | 3–1 (4–2 agg.) | (Bulgaria) Litex Lovech | Žilina, Slovakia |
| 19:30 CEST (UTC+2) | Jež (penalty missed) 22'; Rilke 52'; Oravec 70'; Ceesay 84' | Report | Bodurov (yellow card) 22'; I. Popov (yellow card) 25' (yellow-red card) 53'; Sandrinho 50'; Niflore (yellow card) 61'; Jelenković (yellow card) 70'; Berberović (yellow card) 73' | Stadium: Štadión pod Dubňom; Attendance: 8,123; Referee: Thomas Einwaller (Austria) |
Note: Žilina won 4–2 on aggregate.

==== Play-off round ====
| 17 August 2010 First leg | Sparta Prague (Czech Republic) | 0–2 | (Slovakia) Žilina | Prague, Czech Republic |
| 20:45 CEST (UTC+2) | Brabec (yellow card) 38'; Řepka (yellow card) 66'; Vachoušek (yellow card) 78' | Report | Ceesay (yellow card) 36', (goal) 51'; Bello (yellow card) 68'; Oravec (yellow card) 73'; Majtán (yellow card) 80' | Stadium: Generali Arena; Attendance: 18,744; Referee: Martin Atkinson (England) |

| 25 August 2010 Second leg | Žilina (Slovakia) | 1–0 (3–0 agg.) | (Czech Republic) Sparta Prague | Žilina, Slovakia |
| 20:45 CEST (UTC+2) | Ceesay 18'; Pečalka (yellow card) 54'; Rilke (yellow card) 55' | Report | Kladrubský (yellow card) 37', (penalty missed) 54'; Kucka (yellow card) 40'; Vachoušek (yellow card) 52' | Stadium: Štadión pod Dubňom; Attendance: 10,892; Referee: Olegário Benquerença (Portugal) |
Note: Žilina won 3–0 on aggregate.

==== Group stage ====
| Pos | Team | Pld | W | D | L | GF | GA | GD | Pts | Qualification | CHE | MAR | SPM | ZIL |
|---|---|---|---|---|---|---|---|---|---|---|---|---|---|---|
| 1 | (England) Chelsea | 6 | 5 | 0 | 1 | 14 | 4 | +10 | 15 | Advance to knockout phase | — | 2–0 | 4–1 | 2–1 |
| 2 | (France) Marseille | 6 | 4 | 0 | 2 | 12 | 3 | +9 | 12 | Advance to knockout phase | 1–0 | — | 0–1 | 1–0 |
| 3 | (Russia) Spartak Moscow | 6 | 3 | 0 | 3 | 7 | 10 | −3 | 9 | Transfer to Europa League | 0–2 | 0–3 | — | 3–0 |
| 4 | (Slovakia) Žilina | 6 | 0 | 0 | 6 | 3 | 19 | −16 | 0 | | 1–4 | 0–7 | 1–2 | — |

Source: Soccerway

| 15 September 2010 1 | Žilina (Slovakia) | 1–4 | (England) Chelsea | Žilina, Slovakia |
| 20:45 CEST (UTC+2) | Oravec 55' | Report | Essien 13'; Anelka 24', 28'; Sturridge 48' | Stadium: Štadión pod Dubňom; Attendance: 10,829; Referee: Björn Kuipers (Netherlands) |

| 28 September 2010 2 | Spartak Moscow (Russia) | 3–0 | (Slovakia) Žilina | Moscow, Russia |
| 20:30 MSK (UTC+4) | Ari 34', 61'; Ibson 89' | Report | Guldan (yellow card) 17'; Pečalka (yellow card) 41' | Stadium: Luzhniki Stadium; Attendance: 37,000; Referee: Martin Hansson (Sweden) |

| 19 October 2010 3 | Marseille (France) | 1–0 | (Slovakia) Žilina | Marseille, France |
| 20:45 CEST (UTC+2) | Valbuena (yellow card) 48'; Diawara 48'; Taiwo (yellow card) 49'; A. Ayew (yellow card) 52'; Mbia (yellow card) 83' | Report | Guldan (yellow card) 78' | Stadium: Stade Vélodrome; Attendance: 49,250; Referee: István Vad (Hungary) |

| 3 November 2010 4 | Žilina (Slovakia) | 0–7 | (France) Marseille | Žilina, Slovakia |
| 20:45 CET (UTC+1) | Pečalka (yellow card) 45' | Report | Gignac 12', 21', 54'; Heinze 24'; Rémy 36'; Lucho 52', 63' | Stadium: Štadión pod Dubňom; Attendance: 9,664; Referee: Stefan Johannesson (Sweden) |

| 23 November 2010 5 | Chelsea (England) | 2–1 | (Slovakia) Žilina | London, England |
| 19:45 GMT (UTC) | Sturridge 51'; Ramires (yellow card) 80'; Malouda 86' | Report | Bello 19' | Stadium: Stamford Bridge; Attendance: 40,266; Referee: Robert Schörgenhofer (Austria) |

| 8 December 2010 6 | Žilina (Slovakia) | 1–2 | (Russia) Spartak Moscow | Žilina, Slovakia |
| 20:45 CET (UTC+1) | Guldan (yellow card) 25'; Bello (yellow card) 45+1'; Poliaček (yellow card) 45+1'; Majtán 48'; Piaček (yellow card) 49'; Pečalka (yellow card) 75' | Report | Alex 54'; Ibson 61', (red card) 77'; K. Kombarov (yellow card) 66' | Stadium: Štadión pod Dubňom; Attendance: 7,208; Referee: Kevin Blom (Netherlands) |
