= 2011 Slovak Cup final =

2010–11 Slovak Cup final
- Event: 2010–11 Slovak Cup
Slovan Bratislava	MŠK Žilina
3	3
- Slovan Bratislava won 5–4 on penalties
- Date: 8 May 2011
- Venue: Štadión SNP, Banská Bystrica
- Referee: Pavel Královec (Czech Republic)
- Attendance: 2,653

The 2010–11 Slovak Cup final was the final match of the 2010–11 Slovak Cup, the 42nd season of the top cup competition in Slovak football. The match was played at the Štadión SNP in Banská Bystrica on 8 May 2011 between defending champions Slovan Bratislava and Žilina. Slovan Bratislava defeated Žilina via penalty shootout to win the cup.

== Road to the final ==
Slovan			Round	Žilina
Opponent	Result	Legs		Opponent	Result	Legs
Púchov	6–0		Second Round	Vranov nad Topľou	5-0
Trenčín	2–1(a.e.t.)		Third Round	Senec	3-1
Myjava	3–0	2–0 home; 1–0 away	Quarter-finals	Liptovský Mikuláš	4-0	1–0 home; 3-0 away
Trnava	5-4	2–2 home; 3-2 away	Semi-finals	Zlaté Moravce	3-1	3–0 home; 0-1 away

== Match ==
=== Details ===
8 May 2011
13:30 CEST

Slovan Bratislava	3–3 (a.e.t.)	MŠK Žilina
Ľ. Guldan 7' (o.g.); Šebo 76', 113'	Report	Zošák 15'; Lietava 40'; Mráz 120+1'
Penalties
Šebo (penalty missed); Žofčák (penalty scored); Grendel (penalty scored); Hrdlička (penalty scored); Guédé (penalty scored); Dobrotka (penalty missed); Dosoudil (penalty scored)	5–4	(penalty scored) Mráz; (penalty scored) Guldan; (penalty scored) Pich; (penalty missed) Šourek; (penalty scored) Lietava; (penalty missed) Ceesay; (penalty missed) Gergel

Štadión SNP, Banská Bystrica
Attendance: 2,653
Referee: Pavel Královec (Czech Republic)

Slovan	Žilina

SLOVAN:
GK	11	(Slovakia) Matúš Putnocký
RB	25	(Slovakia) Lukáš Pauschek
CB	6	(Slovakia) Martin Dobrotka
CB	29	(Czech Republic) Radek Dosoudil
LB	5	(Czech Republic) Tomáš Hrdlička
CM	19	(Togo) Karim Guédé
CM	11	(Bosnia and Herzegovina) Mario Božić	(yellow card) 45'	(substituted off) 73'
LM	7	(Serbia) Marko Milinković		(substituted off) 60'
RM	10	(Slovakia) Igor Žofčák (c)
CF	20	(Bosnia and Herzegovina) Krešimir Kordić		(substituted off) 46'
CF	33	(Slovakia) Filip Šebo
Substitutes:
GK	1	(Slovakia) Peter Bartalský
CB	23	(Slovakia) Kristián Kolčák
RB	18	(Ivory Coast) Mamadou Bagayoko		(substituted on) 60'
CM	15	(Slovakia) Filip Kiss
CM	8	(Slovakia) Erik Grendel		(substituted on) 46'	(yellow card) 63'
FW	21	(Slovakia) Peter Štepanovský
FW	13	(Slovakia) Ákos Szarka		(substituted on) 73'
Coach:
(Czech Republic) Karel Jarolím

ŽILINA:
GK	30	(Slovakia) Martin Dúbravka
RB	5	(Slovakia) Ľubomír Guldan
CB	15	(Slovakia) Jozef Piaček
CB	23	(Czech Republic) Ondřej Šourek
LB	7	(Slovakia) Vladimír Leitner (c)		(substituted off) 106'
RM	28	(Benin) Bello Babatounde
CM	27	(Slovakia) Štefan Zošák		(substituted off) 84'
CM	45	(Cameroon) Ernest Mabouka
LM	10	(Slovakia) Tomáš Majtán	(yellow card) 20'	(substituted off) 63'
CF	18	(The Gambia) Momodou Ceesay	(yellow card) 56'
CF	39	(Slovakia) Ivan Lietava		(substituted off) 63'
Substitutes:
GK	22	(Slovakia) Martin Krnáč
RB	2	(Slovakia) Stanislav Angelovič
CB	4	(Slovakia) Patrik Šimko
LB	29	(Benin) Prince Ofori
MF	6	(Slovakia) Patrik Mráz		(substituted on) 63'
MF	42	(Slovakia) Roman Gergel		(substituted on) 84'
FW	17	(Slovakia) Róbert Pich		(substituted on) 106'
Coach:
(Czech Republic) Pavel Hapal

Assistant referees:
Miroslav Zlámal (Czech Republic)
Martin Wilczek (Czech Republic)
