= 2010–11 Slovak Cup =

Tournament details
- Country: Slovakia
- Teams: 52

Final positions
- Champions: Slovan Bratislava
- Runners-up: Žilina

Tournament statistics
- Matches played: 57

The 2010–11 Slovak Cup was the forty-second season of Slovakia's annual knock-out football cup competition and the eighteenth since the independence of Slovakia. It began on 23 August 2010 and will ended on 8 May 2011 with the final. As the 22nd ranked league system using the UEFA coefficient, the winners of the competition will earn a place in the third qualifying round of the UEFA Europa League.

ŠK Slovan Bratislava won the cup after beating Žilina 5–4 on penalties.

== Calendar ==
| Round | Date(s) | Number of fixtures | Clubs | New entries this round |
|---|---|---|---|---|
| First round | 24 and 25 August 2010 | 20 | 40 → 20 | 40 |
| Second round | 21 and 22 September 2010 | 16 | 32 → 16 | 12 |
| Third round | 19 and 26 October 2010 | 8 | 16 → 8 | none |
| Quarter-finals | 2 and 23 November 2010 | 8 | 8 → 4 | none |
| Semi-finals | 5 and 19 April 2011 | 4 | 4 → 2 | none |
| Final | 8 May 2011 | 1 | 2 → 1 | none |

== First round ==
The games were played on Tuesday, 24 August 2010 and Wednesday, 25 August 2010. Forty teams competed in this round – the 12 competing teams in the Slovak First League (second tier) and 28 teams from the Slovak Second League. Participants were divided into a West division and East division in this stage.

| Team 1 | Score | Team 2 |
|---|---|---|
| ŠK SFM Senec | 3–0 (w/o) | Birmingham Vrbové |
| MFK Goral Stará Ľubovňa | 0–3 (w/o) | MFK Vranov nad Topľou |
| PŠC Pezinok | 1–0 | Nové Mesto nad Váhom |
| FC ŠTK 1914 Šamorín | 4–0 | FK Supava |
| ŠK Slovan Nemšová | 2–0 | FK Rača |
| Spartak Vráble | 0–1 | FC Petržalka 1898 |
| MFK Zemplín Michalovce | 6–0 | Slavoj Trebišov |
| OŠK Trenčianske Stankovce | 2–3 | ŠK Blava Jaslovské Bohunice |
| Sokol Ľubotice | 0–1 | FK Poprad |
| Tatran NAO Liptovský Mikuláš | 1–1 (a.e.t.), (4–3 p) | Partizán Bardejov |
| FK Slovan Duslo Šaľa | 4–0 | MFK Topvar Topoľčany |
| FC Nové Zámky | 0–4 | TJ Spartak Myjava |
| AS Trenčín | 6–0 | SK Bernolákovo |
| FK Púchov | 4–1 | OTJ Moravany Váhom |
| ŠK Odeva Lipany | 6–2 | FK Baník Ružiná |
| MFK Lokomotíva Zvolen | 1–4 | FK Spišská Nová Ves |
| HFC Humenné | 3–0 | LAFC Lucenec |
| MŠK Rimavská Sobota | 0–1 | ŽP ŠPORT Podbrezová II |
| MFK Dolný Kubín | 7–2 | Sokol Dolná Ždaňa |
| ŠK Kremnicka | 1–0 | FK Bodva Moldava |

== Second round ==
The draw for the second round was held in September 2010. Nine of the sixteen games were held on Tuesday, 21 September 2010, six on Wednesday, 22 September 2010, and one on Tuesday, 28 September 2010. In this round, the 12 teams from the Slovak Superliga joined the 20 winners from Round 1.

| Team 1 | Score | Team 2 |
|---|---|---|
| FK Slovan Duslo Šaľa | 0–1 | FC Nitra |
| FC Petržalka 1898 | 2–1 | DAC 1904 Dunajská Streda |
| PŠC Pezinok | 0–3 | ŠK SFM Senec |
| TJ Spartak Myjava | 3–1 | FK Senica |
| FC ŠTK 1914 Šamorín | 2–5 | FC ViOn Zlaté Moravce |
| ŠK Kremnička | 0–3 | MFK Dubnica |
| FK Poprad | 0–1 | Dukla Banská Bystrica |
| ŠK Odeva Lipany | 1–1 (4–3 p) | FC Tatran Prešov |
| MFK Vranov nad Topľou | 0–5 | MŠK Žilina |
| ŠK Blava Jaslovské Bohunice | 0–5 | AS Trenčín |
| FK Spišská Nová Ves | 3–0 | MFK Košice |
| MFK Zemplín Michalovce | 0–0 (3–4 p) | MFK Ružomberok |
| ŽP ŠPORT Podbrezová II | 2–0 | MFK Dolný Kubín |
| HFC Humenné | 1–2 | Tatran NAO Liptovský Mikuláš |
| ŠK Slovan Bratislava | 6–0 | FK Púchov |
| ŠK Slovan Nemšová | 0–2 | FC Spartak Trnava |

== Third round ==
The sixteen winners of the second round competed in the third round. The draw for the third round was held on 8 October 2010. Games were played on 19 October 2010, with the exception of the ŠK SFM Senec/MŠK Žilina match, which will be played on 26 October 2010.

| Team 1 | Score | Team 2 |
|---|---|---|
| ŠK Odeva Lipany | 0–1 | MFK Ružomberok |
| Tatran NAO Liptovský Mikuláš | 0–0 (4–2 p) | FK Dukla Banská Bystrica |
| FK Spišská Nová Ves | 0–5 | FC Spartak Trnava |
| ŽP ŠPORT Podbrezová II | 0–1 | FC Nitra |
| TJ Spartak Myjava | 1–0 | MFK Dubnica |
| AS Trenčín | 1–1 (2–3 p) | ŠK Slovan Bratislava |
| FC ViOn Zlaté Moravce | 2–1 | FC Petržalka 1898 |
| ŠK SFM Senec | 1–3 | MŠK Žilina |

== Quarter-finals ==
The eight winners from the third round competed in the two-legged quarterfinals on 2 and 23 November 2010, with the exception of the MŠK Žilina/Tatran Liptovský Mikuláš matches, which took place on 11 November and 1 December 2010.

=== First legs ===
| 2 November 2010 | Spartak Myjava | 0–1 | Slovan Bratislava | Myjava |
| 14:00 | | Report | Kordić 12' | Stadium: Stadium Myjava; Attendance: 2,200; Referee: Patrik Hrčka |

| 2 November 2010 | Ružomberok | 0–3 | Spartak Trnava | Ružomberok |
| 15:30 | | Report | Čarnota 6'; Koné 59'; Higor 71' | Stadium: Štadión pod Čebraťom; Attendance: 1,010; Referee: Ivan Kružliak |

| 2 November 2010 | Nitra | 1–0 | ViOn Zlaté Moravce | Nitra |
| 16:00 | Rák 83' | Report | | Stadium: Štadión pod Zoborom; Attendance: 720; Referee: Roman Matúš |

| 10 November 2010 | Tatran Liptovský Mikuláš | 0–1 | MŠK Žilina | Liptovský Mikuláš |
| 14:00 | | Report | Kapláň 4' (o.g.) | Stadium: Stadium Liptovský Mikuláš; Attendance: 5,113; Referee: Dušan Sedlák |

=== Second legs ===
| 23 November 2010 | Slovan Bratislava | 2–0 (3–0 agg.) | Spartak Myjava | Bratislava |
| 17:00 | Kordić 14'; Králík 87' | Report | | Stadium: Štadión Pasienky; Attendance: 602; Referee: Miroslav Fajčík |

| 23 November 2010 | Spartak Trnava | 3–0 (6–0 agg.) | Ružomberok | Trnava |
| 17:00 | Gross 53'; Higor 65'; Bernáth 70' | Report | | Stadium: Anton Malatinský Stadium; Attendance: 858; Referee: Pavol Chmura |

| 23 November 2010 | ViOn Zlaté Moravce | 2–0 (2–1 agg.) | Nitra | Zlaté Moravce |
| 17:00 | Kuračka 59'; Pavlovič 88' | Report | | Stadium: Štadión FC ViOn; Attendance: 824; Referee: Jozef Pavlík |

| 1 December 2010 | MŠK Žilina | 3–0 (4–0 agg.) | Tatran Liptovský Mikuláš | Žilina |
| 14:00 | Poliaček 20'; Jež 45'; Majtán 46' | Report | | Stadium: Štadión pod Dubňom; Attendance: 500; Referee: Vladimír Vnuk |

== Semi-finals ==
The four winners from the quarterfinals competed in the two-legged semifinals. The first legs took place on 5 April 2011 and the second legs took place on 19 April 2011.

=== First legs ===
| 5 April 2011 | MŠK Žilina | 3–0 | ViOn Zlaté Moravce | Žilina |
| 16:30 | Ceesay 29', 50'; Majtán 70' (pen.) | Report | | Stadium: Štadión pod Dubňom; Attendance: 1,673; Referee: Ivan Kružliak |

| 5 April 2011 | Slovan Bratislava | 2–2 | Spartak Trnava | Bratislava |
| 19:00 | Koné 40' (o.g.); Milinković 72' | Report | Koné 29'; Machovec 39' | Stadium: Štadión Pasienky; Attendance: 4,900; Referee: Pavel Olšiak |

=== Second legs ===
| 19 April 2011 | ViOn Zlaté Moravce | 1–0 (1–3 agg.) | MŠK Žilina | Zlaté Moravce |
| 17:30 | Janečka 11' | Report | | Stadium: Štadión FC ViOn; Attendance: 1,665; Referee: Dušan Sedlák |

| 19 April 2011 | Spartak Trnava | 2–3 (4–5 agg.) | Slovan Bratislava | Trnava |
| 17:30 | Tomaček 69', 90' | Report | Grendel 12'; Guédé 27'; Dobrotka 33' | Stadium: Anton Malatinský Stadium; Attendance: 2,586; Referee: Ľubomír Samotný |

== Final ==
8 May 2011
13:30 CEST

| Slovan Bratislava | 3–3 (a.e.t.) | MŠK Žilina |
|---|---|---|
| Ľ. Guldan 7' (o.g.); Šebo 76', 113' | Report | Zošák 15'; Lietava 40'; Mráz 120+1' |
Penalties
| Šebo (penalty missed); Žofčák (penalty scored); Grendel (penalty scored); Hrdlička (penalty scored); Guédé (penalty scored); Dobrotka (penalty missed); Dosoudil (penalty scored) | 5–4 | (penalty scored) Mráz; (penalty scored) Guldan; (penalty scored) Pich; (penalty missed) Šourek; (penalty scored) Lietava; (penalty missed) Ceesay; (penalty missed) Gergel |

Štadión SNP, Banská Bystrica
Attendance: 2,653
Referee: Pavel Královec (Czech Republic)
