= 2010 Slovak Super Cup =

MŠK Žilina	Slovan Bratislava
1	1
- MŠK Žilina won 3–1 on penalties
- Date: 4 July 2010
- Venue: Štadión Pasienky, Bratislava
- Referee: Pavol Chmura
- Attendance: 1,237

The 2010 Slovak Super Cup was a football match played by the 2009–10 Slovak Superliga champions MŠK Žilina and the 2009–10 Slovak Cup winners ŠK Slovan Bratislava on July 4, 2010. The match was played in Štadión Pasienky, Slovakia. MŠK Žilina won 4-2 in penalties and earned their fourth Super Cup.

The match was attended by 1,237 viewers. Referee was Pavol Chmura, who was assisted by Erik Weiss and Gabriel Ádám.

== Match details ==
4 July 2010
18:00 CEST

MŠK Žilina	1–1	Slovan Bratislava
Zošák 49'	Report	Halenár 47'
Penalties
Majtán (penalty scored); Bello (penalty missed); Angelovič (penalty scored); Leitner (penalty scored); Jež (penalty scored)	4–2	(penalty scored) Halenár; (penalty scored) Dosoudil; (penalty missed) Dobrotka; (penalty missed) Grendel

Pasienky, Bratislava
Attendance: 1,237
Referee: Pavol Chmura

Žilina	Slovan

Žilina (4-1-3-2):
GK	30	(Slovakia) Martin Dúbravka
RB	2	(Slovakia) Stanislav Angelovič
CB	23	(Czech Republic) Ondřej Šourek
CB	15	(Slovakia) Jozef Piaček
LB	6	(Slovakia) Patrik Mráz	(yellow card) 41'	(substituted off) 76'
DM	12	(Slovakia) Róbert Jež (c)
RM	27	(Slovakia) Štefan Zošák		(substituted off) 65'
AM	28	(Benin) Bello Babatounde
LM	9	(Czech Republic) Emil Rilke	(yellow card) 45'
FW	10	(Slovakia) Tomáš Majtán
FW	14	(Slovakia) Tomáš Oravec		(substituted off) 46'
Substitutes:
DF	7	(Slovakia) Vladimír Leitner		(substituted on) 76'
MF	5	(Slovakia) Ľubomír Guldan		(substituted on) 65'
FW	39	(Slovakia) Ivan Lietava		(substituted on) 46'
Manager:
(Czech Republic) Pavel Hapal

Slovan (4-1-3-2):
GK	30	(Slovakia) Matúš Putnocký
RB	18	(Ivory Coast) Mamadou Bagayoko
CB	6	(Slovakia) Martin Dobrotka
CB	29	(Czech Republic) Radek Dosoudil (c)	(yellow card) 62'
LB	28	(Slovakia) Marián Had
DM	19	(Slovakia) Karim Guédé
RM	7	(Slovakia) Milan Ivana		(substituted off) 75'
AM	11	(Bosnia and Herzegovina) Mario Božić		(substituted off) 65'
LM	8	(Slovakia) Erik Grendel
FW	9	(Slovakia) Juraj Halenár
FW	17	(Slovakia) Jakub Sylvestr
Substitutes:
MF	10	(Slovakia) Samuel Slovák		(substituted on) 65'
MF	21	(Slovakia) Peter Štepanovský		(substituted on) 75'
Manager:
(Slovakia) Jozef Jankech
