= 2010–11 Slovak Superliga =

Corgoň Liga
- Season: 2010–11
- Dates: 17 July 2010 – 25 May 2011
- Champions: Slovan Bratislava
- Relegated: Dubnica
- Champions League: Slovan Bratislava
- Europa League: Senica; Žilina; Spartak Trnava
- Matches: 198
- Goals: 436 (2.2 per match)
- Top goalscorer: Filip Šebo (22 goals each)
- Biggest home win: Slovan 6-1 Dubnica
- Biggest away win: Nitra 0–5 Senica
- Highest scoring: Slovan 6-1 Dubnica; Dubnica 2–5 Žilina
- Highest attendance: 8,936
- Average attendance: ▼2,251

The 2010–11 season of the Slovak Superliga (also known as Corgoň Liga due to sponsorship reasons) was the eighteenth season of the first-tier football league in Slovakia, since its establishment in 1993. It began on 17 July 2010 and was completed on 25 May 2011. MŠK Žilina were the defending champions, having won their fifth Slovak league championship the previous season.

== Teams ==
Petržalka were relegated after finishing the 2009–10 season in 12th and last place. They were replaced by 2009–10 1. Liga champions ViOn Zlaté Moravce.

Location of teams in 2010–11 Slovak Superliga

Team	Location	Stadium	Capacity
DAC 1904	Dunajská Streda	Mestský štadión – DAC Dunajská Streda	16,410
MFK Dubnica	Dubnica	Mestský štadión	5,450
Dukla	Banská Bystrica	SNP Stadium	10,000
MFK Košice	Košice	Štadión Lokomotívy v Čermeli	9,600
FC Nitra	Nitra	Štadión pod Zoborom	11,384
MFK Ružomberok	Ružomberok	Štadión MFK Ružomberok	4,817
FK Senica	Senica	Štadión FK Senica	4,600
Slovan	Bratislava	Pasienky	12,000
Spartak	Trnava	Štadión Antona Malatinského	18,448
Tatran	Prešov	Tatran Štadión	14,000
ViOn Zlaté Moravce	Zlaté Moravce	Štadión FC ViOn	4,000
MŠK Žilina	Žilina	Stadium pod Dubňom	13,000

=== Personnel and kits ===
Note: Flags indicate national team as has been defined under FIFA eligibility rules. Players and Managers may hold more than one non-FIFA nationality.

Team	Manager^{1}	Captain	Kit manufacturer	Shirt sponsor
DAC 1904 Dunajská Streda	(Slovakia) Mikuláš Radványi	(Slovakia) Jaroslav Hílek	Adidas	Regin
MFK Dubnica	(Slovakia) Peter Gergely	(Slovakia) Pavel Kováč	Joma	-
FK Dukla Banská Bystrica	(Slovakia) Karol Marko	(Slovakia) Viktor Pečovský	Adidas	Dôvera
MFK Košice	(Serbia) Žarko Djurović	(Slovakia) Peter Šinglár	Umbro	Steel Trans
FC Nitra	(Slovakia) Ivan Galád	(Slovakia) Róbert Rák	Jako	Bonul Security, El Comp, Špeciál Izotex
MFK Ružomberok	(Slovakia) Ladislav Jurkemik	(Slovakia) Tomáš Ďubek	Umbro	Maestro
FK Senica	(Slovakia) Stanislav Griga	(Slovakia) Ján Gajdošík	Hummel	101 Drogerie
ŠK Slovan Bratislava	(Slovakia) Jozef Jankech	(Czech Republic) Radek Dosoudil	Adidas	Grafobal
FC Spartak Trnava	(Slovakia) Dušan Radolský	(Czech Republic) Martin Raška	Givova	Danube Wings
1. FC Tatran Prešov	(Slovakia) Roman Pivarník	(Czech Republic) David Čep	Adidas	-
FC ViOn Zlaté Moravce	(Slovakia) Juraj Jarábek	(Slovakia) Peter Kuračka	Legea	ViOn
MŠK Žilina	(Czech Republic) Pavel Hapal	(Slovakia) Róbert Jež	Nike	Lambi

=== Managerial changes ===
Team	Outgoing manager	Manner of departure	Date of vacancy	Table	Incoming manager	Date of appointment
Tatran Prešov	(Slovakia) Roman Pivarník	Sacked	22 August 2010	Pre-season	(Slovakia) Ladislav Pecko	23 August 2010
MFK Košice	(Serbia) Žarko Djurović	Mutual agreement	28 September 2010	Pre-season	(Slovakia) Štefan Tarkovič	28 September 2010
MFK Ružomberok	(Slovakia) Ladislav Jurkemik	Mutual agreement	10 October 2010	Pre-season	(Slovakia) Goran Milojević	11 October 2010
Slovan Bratislava	(Slovakia) Jozef Jankech	Resigned	13 October 2010	Pre-season	(Czech Republic) Karel Jarolím	13 October 2010
Dukla Banská Bystrica	(Slovakia) Karol Marko	Mutual agreement	30 October 2010	Pre-season	(Slovakia) Štefan Zaťko	8 November 2010
FC Nitra	(Slovakia) Ivan Galád	Sacked	24 November 2010	Pre-season	(Slovakia) Ivan Vrabec	21 December 2010
FC Nitra	(Slovakia) Ivan Vrabec	Sacked	13 March 2011	Pre-season	(Slovakia) Cyril Stachura	14 March 2011
Spartak Trnava	(Slovakia) Dušan Radolský	Sacked	19 March 2011	Pre-season	(Slovakia) Peter Zelenský	22 March 2011
MFK Ružomberok	(Serbia) Goran Milojević	Mutual agreement	25 March 2011	Pre-season	(Slovakia) Ladislav Jurkemik	25 March 2011

== League table ==
Pos	Team	Pld	W	D	L	GF	GA	GD	Pts	Qualification or relegation
1	Slovan Bratislava (C)	33	20	8	5	63	22	+41	68	Qualification for Champions League second qualifying round
2	Senica	33	18	7	8	54	30	+24	61	Qualification for Europa League third qualifying round (Note: Slovan Bratislava, winners of the 2010–11 Slovak Cup, qualified for the Champions League. Since cup runners-up MŠK Žilina are also already assured of a top-four finish, the distribution of all three Europa League spots (both regular spots plus the cup winners' spot) effectively reverted to league placement.)
3	Žilina	33	14	12	7	47	28	+19	54	Qualification for Europa League second qualifying round
4	Spartak Trnava	33	13	10	10	40	30	+10	49	Qualification for Europa League first qualifying round
5	Dukla Banská Bystrica	33	13	9	11	39	32	+7	48	
6	ViOn Zlaté Moravce	33	12	10	11	35	31	+4	46	
7	Ružomberok	33	10	11	12	23	33	−10	41	
8	Nitra	33	11	7	15	30	51	−21	40	
9	DAC Dunajská Streda	33	9	9	15	24	39	−15	36	
10	Košice	33	8	9	16	28	44	−16	33	
11	Tatran Prešov	33	9	6	18	30	49	−19	33	
12	Dubnica (R)	33	7	10	16	23	47	−24	31	Relegation to 2. liga

Source: Kicker (in German)
Rules for classification: 1) points; 2) goal difference; 3) number of goals scored.
(C) Champions; (R) Relegated

== Results ==
The schedule consisted of three rounds. The two first rounds consisted of a conventional home and away round-robin schedule. The pairings of the third round were set according to the 2009–10 final standings. Every team played each opponent once for a total of 11 games per team.

=== First and second round ===
Home \ Away	DAC	DUB	BB	KOŠ	NIT	RUŽ	SEN	SLO	TRN	PRE	ZLM	ŽIL
DAC Dunajská Streda		0–0	0–0	1–0	0–1	3–0	2–3	2–1	1–0	2–1	2–1	2–2
Dubnica	2–1		1–0	0–0	1–1	1–0	0–1	1–1	0–4	0–1	0–4	2–5
Dukla Banská Bystrica	2–0	1–0		4–1	2–0	1–0	1–0	0–0	1–2	3–0	0–0	1–2
Košice	1–0	1–0	1–1		3–0	0–1	2–1	1–2	0–2	4–0	0–1	0–4
Nitra	0–1	3–2	0–2	1–1		1–2	0–5	1–0	1–0	1–0	1–1	0–2
Ružomberok	2–0	0–1	1–0	2–2	1–0		1–2	0–0	0–0	1–0	1–1	1–1
Senica	1–1	1–0	3–0	1–0	2–0	4–0		3–2	1–2	1–1	0–1	2–1
Slovan Bratislava	1–0	6–1	2–0	2–0	0–0	3–0	2–2		1–1	4–0	3–0	0–1
Spartak Trnava	1–1	4–0	1–1	0–0	4–1	2–0	3–0	1–3		1–0	0–0	0–0
Prešov	1–0	1–1	2–1	1–1	1–2	1–1	0–1	2–1	0–0		1–0	2–0
ViOn Zlaté Moravce	1–1	2–1	0–2	4–1	1–2	3–0	0–0	1–1	2–0	1–0		0–4
Žilina	0–0	0–0	3–3	2–0	5–1	3–1	0–0	2–2	1–1	2–1	2–1	

Source: Kicker (in German)
Legend: Blue = home team win; Yellow = draw; Red = away team win.

=== Third round ===
Key numbers for pairing determination (number marks position in 2009–10 final standings):

23rd round	24th round	25th round	26th round	27th round	28th round
1–12	1–2	2–12	1–4	3–12	1–6
2–11	8–6	3–1	2–3	4–2	2–5
3–10	9–5	4–11	9–7	5–1	3–4
4–9	10–4	5–10	10–6	6–11	10–8
5–8	11–3	6–9	11–5	7–10	11–7
6–7	12–7	7–8	12–8	8–9	12–9

29th round	30th round	31st round	32nd round	33rd round
4–12	1–8	5–12	1–10	6–12
5–3	2–7	6–4	2–9	7–5
6–2	3–6	7–3	3–8	8–4
7–1	4–5	8–2	4–7	9–3
8–11	11–9	9–1	5–6	10–2
9–10	12–10	10–11	12–11	11–1

Home \ Away	DAC	DUB	BB	KOŠ	NIT	RUŽ	SEN	SLO	TRN	PRE	ZLM	ŽIL
DAC Dunajská Streda				0–0	1–2		0–3	0–3		2–1		
Dubnica	0–1		2–0			0–0			1–0			1–0
Dukla Banská Bystrica	2–0				0–1		3–2			3–2	1–1	0–0
Košice		1–1	2–1			0–2			1–3			1–0
Nitra		1–1		1–0		0–2		0–1	3–2		0–0	
Ružomberok	1–0		0–0				3–2			0–1	0–0	0–0
Senica		0–0		1–1	3–2			1–2	4–0		2–0	
Slovan Bratislava		3–1	3–1	4–0		1–0			3–0		1–0	
Spartak Trnava	3–0		0–2			0–0				2–1		1–0
Prešov		2–1		0–3	3–3		0–1	0–2				
ViOn Zlaté Moravce	3–0	2–1		1–0					1–0	2–3		
Žilina	0–0				2–0		0–1	0–3 (Note: The match was awarded to Slovan by a score of 3–0 after the assistant referee was attacked by Žilina supporter.)		2–1	1–0	

Source: Kicker (in German)
Legend: Blue = home team win; Yellow = draw; Red = away team win.

== Top goalscorers ==
Updated through matches played on 25 May 2011

Rank	Player	Club	Goals
1	(Slovakia) Filip Šebo	Slovan Bratislava	22
2	(Czech Republic) Ondřej Smetana	FK Senica	18
3	(Slovakia) Tomáš Majtán	MŠK Žilina	11
3	(Slovakia) Tomáš Oravec	MŠK Žilina	11
5	(Ivory Coast) Koro Issa Koné	Spartak Trnava	10
5	(Czech Republic) Jaroslav Diviš	FK Senica	10
7	(Slovakia) Róbert Rák	FC Nitra	9
8	(Serbia) Marko Milinković	MFK Košice/Slovan Bratislava	8
8	(Slovakia) Róbert Pich	Dukla Banská Bystrica/MŠK Žilina	8
10	(Slovakia) Ľubomír Bernáth	Spartak Trnava	7
10	(Slovakia) Juraj Piroska	FK Senica	7

== Awards ==
=== Top Eleven ===
- Goalkeeper: (Czech Republic) Petr Bolek (FK Senica)
- Defence: (Slovakia) Lukáš Pauschek (ŠK Slovan), (Slovakia) Martin Dobrotka (ŠK Slovan), (Slovakia) Mário Pečalka (MŠK Žilina), (Slovakia) Filip Lukšík (FK Senica)
- Midfield: (Togo) (Slovakia) Karim Guédé (ŠK Slovan), (Serbia) Marko Milinković (MFK Košice, ŠK Slovan) (Slovakia) Róbert Jež (MŠK Žilina), (Slovakia) Igor Žofčák (ŠK Slovan),
- Attack: (Slovakia) Filip Šebo (ŠK Slovan), (Czech Republic) Ondřej Smetana (FK Senica)

=== Individual awards ===
Manager of the season Stanislav Griga (FK Senica)

Player of the Year Filip Šebo (ŠK Slovan)

Young player of the Year Lukáš Pauschek (ŠK Slovan)

== Attendances ==
#	Club	Average
1	Trnava	4,123
2	Žilina	3,199
3	DAC	3,173
4	Slovan	2,501
5	Senica	2,310
6	Dubnica	1,969
7	Dukla	1,949
8	ViOn	1,779
9	Prešov	1,741
10	Nitra	1,707
11	Ružomberok	1,597
12	Košice	978

== See also ==
- 2010–11 Slovak Cup
- 2010–11 Slovak First League
