= 2007–08 Slovak Cup =

Tournament details
- Country: Slovakia
- Teams: 54

Final positions
- Champions: Artmedia Petržalka
- Runners-up: Spartak Trnava

The 2007–08 Slovak Cup was the 39th season of Slovakia's annual knock-out cup competition and the fourteenth since the independence of Slovakia. It began on 7 August 2007 with the matches of first round and ended on 1 May 2008 with the final. The winners of the competition earned a place in the first qualifying round of the UEFA Cup. Zlaté Moravce were the defending champions.

== First round ==
The sixteen games were played on 7 August 2007 and the match TJ Sokol Dolná Ždaňa – HFK Prievidza was played on 21 August 2007.

Team 1	Score	Team 2
Slovan Duslo Šaľa	0–0 (3–1 p)	FKS Nemšová
Inter Bratislava	3–0	MFK Vrbové
PŠC Pezinok	0–2	MFK Topvar Topoľčany
Spartak Vráble	1–0	FK Rača
SFM Senec	3–0	ŠKP Dúbravka-Bratislava
FK Púchov	0–1	AFC Nové Mesto nad Váhom
DAC Dunajská Streda	5–0	OTJ Moravany nad Váhom
FK Spišská Nová Ves	1–0	MFK Zemplín Michalovce
MFK Rimavská Sobota	1–2	LAFC Lučenec
FK Žiar nad Hronom	1–1 (3–1 p)	ŽP Šport Podbrezová
Slavoj Trebišov	0–1	Odeva Lipany
MFK Dolný Kubín	2–1	ŠK Aqua Turčianske Teplice
MŠK Tesla Stropkov	2–0	MFK Stará Ľubovňa
HFC Humenné	2–1	Tatran NAO Liptovský Mikuláš
FK Čadca	1–5	Tatran Prešov
FK Rakytovce	6–2	MFK Vranov nad Topľou
TJ Sokol Dolná Ždaňa	0–0 (4–3 p)	HFK Prievidza

== Second round ==
The ten games were played on 18 September 2007 and the three games were played on 19 September 2007.

Team 1	Score	Team 2
DAC Dunajská Streda	2–0	AFC Nové Mesto nad Váhom
MFK Topvar Topoľčany	1–3	Inter Bratislava
Spartak Vráble	0–3	Slovan Bratislava
TJ Sokol Dolná Ždaňa	0–2	ZTS Dubnica
FK Spišská Nová Ves	1–0	MŠK Tesla Stropkov
MFK Ružomberok	2–0	Dukla Banská Bystrica
MFK Dolný Kubín	2–3	FK Žiar nad Hronom
MFK Košice	1–0	LAFC Lučenec
AS Trenčín	1–0	Slovan Duslo Šaľa
FC Senec	1–3	FC Nitra
SFM Senec	0–2	Spartak Trnava
Odeva Lipany	2–4	HFC Humenné
FK Rakytovce	0–3	Tatran Prešov

== Third round ==
The six games were played on 2 and 3 October 2007, the match DAC Dunajská Streda – Artmedia Petržalka was played on 10 October and the match HFC Humenné – Spartak Trnava on 10 October 2007.

Team 1	Score	Team 2
FK Žiar nad Hronom	1–5	FC Nitra
AS Trenčín	0–2	MFK Košice
ZTS Dubnica	0–2	Inter Bratislava
FC ViOn Zlaté Moravce	0–1	Slovan Bratislava
Tatran Prešov	2–0	FK Spišská Nová Ves
MŠK Žilina	3–0	MFK Ružomberok
DAC Dunajská Streda	0–0 (2–4 p)	Artmedia Petržalka
HFC Humenné	0–1	Spartak Trnava

== Quarter-finals ==
The first legs were played on 23 and 24 October, 6 and 14 November 2007. The second legs were played on 20 and 28 November and 5 December 2007.

=== First legs ===
23 October 2007	MFK Košice	2–0	Slovan Bratislava	Košice
16:30	Novák 50'; Jurčo 80'	Report		Stadium: Štadión Lokomotívy; Attendance: 523; Referee: Pavol Šipoš

24 October 2007	Inter Bratislava	0–4	Artmedia Petržalka	Bratislava
14:00		Report	Mráz 3'; Fodrek 33'; Halenár 53'; Piroska 78'	Stadium: Štadión Pasienky; Attendance: 394; Referee: Michal Smolák

6 November 2007	MŠK Žilina	2–2	FC Nitra	Žilina
17:30	Tesák 4'; Jež 42'	Report	Gruber 57'; Babic 90+'	Stadium: Štadión pod Dubňom; Attendance: 1,564; Referee: Jozef Pavlík

14 November 2007	Tatran Prešov	0–1	Spartak Trnava	Prešov
17:00		Report	Ďuriš 38'	Stadium: Štadión Tatranu; Attendance: 4,300; Referee: Vladimír Hriňák

=== Second legs ===
20 November 2007	Spartak Trnava	0–0 (1–0 agg.)	Tatran Prešov	Trnava
17:00		Report		Stadium: Anton Malatinský Stadium; Attendance: 2,100; Referee: Richard Trutz

28 November 2007	Artmedia Petržalka	2–1 (6–1 agg.)	Inter Bratislava	Bratislava
13:00	Piroska 59'; Fodrek 77'	Report	Petrán 2'	Stadium: Štadión Petržalka; Attendance: 200; Referee: Ivan Kružliak

28 November 2007	Slovan Bratislava	0–0 (0–2 agg.)	MFK Košice	Bratislava
16:30		Report		Stadium: Tehelné pole Referee: Pavol Šipoš

5 December 2007	FC Nitra	2–2 (4–4 agg.) (3–4 p)	MŠK Žilina	Nitra
16:30	Hesek 85'; Gruber 90+'	Report	Belák 71'; Jež 77' (pen.)	Stadium: Štadión pod Zoborom; Attendance: 1,130; Referee: Miroslav Richtárik
	Penalties
	Gruber (penalty missed); Hrnčár (penalty scored); Hesek (penalty missed); Guzmický (penalty scored); Grajciar (penalty scored)		(penalty scored) Jež; (penalty scored) Lietava; (penalty scored) Breška; (penalty missed) Devátý; (penalty scored) Tesák

== Semi-finals ==
The first legs were played on 8 April 2008. The second legs were played on 22 and 23 April 2008.

=== First legs ===
8 April 2008	MFK Košice	0–0	Spartak Trnava	Košice
17:00		Report		Stadium: Štadión Lokomotívy; Attendance: 2,650; Referee: Jozef Pavlík

8 April 2008	MŠK Žilina	0–1	Artmedia Petržalka	Žilina
17:30		Report	Čišovský 10'	Stadium: Štadión pod Dubňom; Attendance: 2,702; Referee: Pavol Šipoš

=== Second legs ===
22 April 2008	Spartak Trnava	3–1 (3–1 agg.)	MFK Košice	Trnava
17:00	Ďuriš 32'; Kožuch 34'; Doležaj 87' (pen.)	Report	J. Novák 56'	Stadium: Anton Malatinský Stadium; Attendance: 5,780; Referee: Jozef Pavlík

23 April 2008	Artmedia Petržalka	1–0 (2–0 agg.)	MŠK Žilina	Bratislava
16:00	Kozák 84' (pen.)	Report		Stadium: Štadión Petržalka; Attendance: 2,000; Referee: Pavol Šipoš

== Final ==
1 May 2008
17:00 CEST

Artmedia Petržalka	1–0	Spartak Trnava
Pospěch 90+1'	Report

Štadión pod Dubňom, Žilina
Attendance: 5,000
Referee: Ľuboš Micheľ
