= Poliaček =

Poliaček is a Slovak surname. Notable people with the surname include:

- Miroslav Poliaček (born 1983), Slovak footballer
- Pavol Poliaček (born 1988), Slovak footballer
