= Mário Pečalka =

Slovak footballer

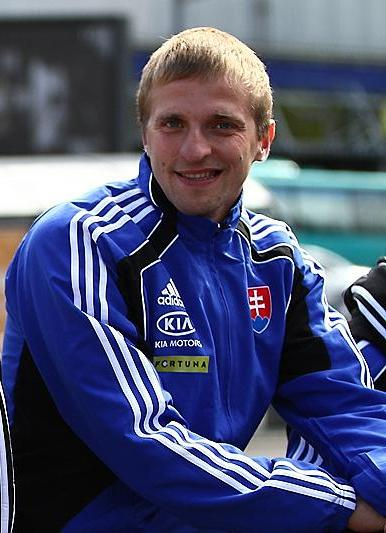

Personal information
- Full name: Mário Pečalka
- Date of birth: 28 December 1980 (age 45)
- Place of birth: Rudina, Czechoslovakia
- Height: 1.84 m (6 ft 1/2 in)
- Position: Centre back

Youth career
- OFK Rudina
- Kysucké Nové Mesto

Senior career*
Years	Team	Apps	(Gls)
2001–2003	FK Mutěnice		
2003–2004	Slovan Rudinská		
2004	→ Slovan Bratislava (loan)	6	(0)
2004–2011	Žilina	103	(4)
2005	→ Lučenec (loan)		
2006	→ Inter Bratislava (loan)	31	(1)
2011–2012	Hapoel Tel Aviv	19	(1)
2012	→ Slovan Bratislava (loan)	5	(0)

International career^{‡}
2009–2011	Slovakia	3	(0)
- * Club domestic league appearances and goals as of 31 May 2012 ‡ National team caps and goals as of 9 February 2011

Mário Pečalka (born 28 December 1980) is a former Slovak football defender.

== Career ==
Pečalka began playing football in his hometown club OFK Rudina. Later he moved to Kysucké Nové Mesto and then he played for the Czech Fourth Division team FK Mutěnice. In 2003, he came back to his home region to play for the Slovak Fourth League team TJ Slovan Rudinská. In 2004, he was on loan in Slovan Bratislava which was playing in the Slovak Second League in this time. After end of loan he signed for the Corgoň Liga club MŠK Žilina. He played for Žilina in 103 matches overall, scoring 4 goals. He twice won the Slovak title in Žilina. He became one of the best Corgoň Liga defenders and was selected to the national team in 2009. He played 5 group matches in the 2010–11 UEFA Champions League. In February 2011, he signed for Israeli club Hapoel Tel Aviv. He made his debut for Hapoel in a 2–0 win against Maccabi Petah Tikva on 14 February 2011. In January 2012, he signed on loan at Slovan Bratislava for half a year. In May 2013, he announced the end of his professional career due persistent back problems.

== International career ==
Pečalka made his national team debut in a 2–3 defeat against Ukraine on 10 February 2009. He was called up to the Slovakia preliminary squad for the 2010 FIFA World Cup but manager Vladimír Weiss did not select him for the final tournament squad.

== Honours ==
Žilina

- Corgoň Liga (2): 2006–07, 2009–10
- Slovak Super Cup (2): 2007, 2010

Hapoel Tel Aviv

- Israel State Cup (1): 2010–11
