= Babatounde Bello =

Beninese footballer

Personal information
- Full name: Babatounde Issiaka Bello
- Date of birth: 6 October 1989 (age 37)
- Place of birth: Esan North-East, Nigeria
- Height: 1.76 m (5 ft 9 in)
- Position: Midfielder

Youth career
- FC Robo

Senior career*
Years	Team	Apps	(Gls)
2005–2006	Soleil		
2006–2014	Žilina	83	(10)
2008	→ Dukla Prague (loan)	0	(0)
2014–2015	Jihlava	0	(0)
2015	→ Frýdek-Místek (loan)	16	(0)
2016–2017	Spartak Trnava	23	(1)

International career^{‡}
2005–2016	Benin	14	(2)
- * Club domestic league appearances and goals as of 9 December 2017 ‡ National team caps and goals as of 9 August 2020

Babatounde Issiaka Bello (born 6 October 1989) is a former Beninese footballer who played as a midfielder.

== Club career ==
Bello began playing football for FC Robo Academy in Nigeria. When he was 15, he came to Benin and joined Soleil in 2005. In July 2006, he signed for Slovak club MŠK Žilina and made his Corgoň Liga debut in a 3–0 home win against Slovan Bratislava on 9 September 2006. He spent two seasons mostly playing for the reserve squad. He joined Czech side Dukla Prague on loan in the autumn of 2008, although he didn't feature for the team before returning to Žilina six months later. Following his return, he scored two goals against Dubnica on 26 May 2009. He qualified with Žilina to the 2010–11 UEFA Champions League and played four group games, scoring a goal against Chelsea in a 2–1 loss at Stamford Bridge. He joined Jihlava of the Czech First League in August 2014.

== International career ==
Born in Nigeria and of Beninese descent, Bello holds citizenship with both countries. On 17 August 2005, Bello made his debut for the Benin national football team, coming on as a substitute for 17 minutes against Sudan.

=== International goals ===
Scores and results list Benin's goal tally first.

No	Date	Venue	Opponent	Score	Result	Competition
1.	8 September 2013	Stade Charles de Gaulle, Porto Novo, Benin	Rwanda	2–0	2–0	2014 FIFA World Cup qualification
2.	12 November 2015	Stade de l'Amitié, Cotonou, Benin	Burkina Faso	2–1	2–1	2018 FIFA World Cup qualification

== Honours ==
Žilina

- Slovak Super Liga: 2006–07, 2009–10
- Slovak Super Cup: 2007, 2010
