= Erik Grendel =

Slovak footballer (born 1988)

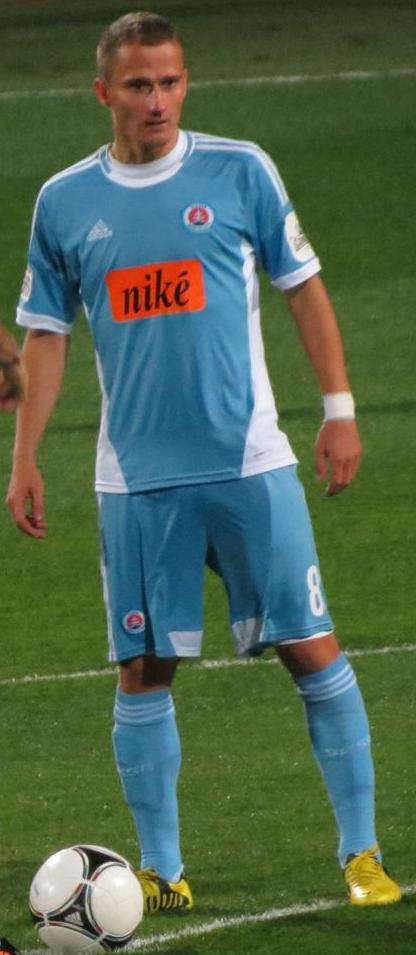

Personal information
- Full name: Erik Grendel
- Date of birth: 13 October 1988 (age 38)
- Place of birth: Handlová, Czechoslovakia
- Height: 1.76 m (5 ft 9 in)
- Position: Midfielder

Team information
- Current team: Slovan Bratislava B (manager)

Youth career
- Zemplín Michalovce
- 2003–2005: Dubnica

Senior career*
Years	Team	Apps	(Gls)
2005–2009	Dubnica	91	(2)
2009–2014	Slovan Bratislava	148	(15)
2015–2018	Górnik Zabrze	49	(3)
2016–2018	Górnik Zabrze II	16	(5)
2018–2020	Spartak Trnava	33	(4)
2020–2022	Železiarne Podbrezová	60	(7)
2023	Pohronie	11	(1)

International career
2006–2007	Slovakia U19		
2007–2010	Slovakia U21		

Managerial career
- 2023–2025: Pohronie (assistant)
- 2025–2026: Pohronie
- 2026–: Slovan Bratislava B
- * Club domestic league appearances and goals

Erik Grendel (born 13 October 1988) is a Slovak former professional footballer who played as a midfielder. He is currently the manager of Slovan Bratislava B.

== Club career ==
He started his senior career in Dubnica, making his league debut in July 2005 at the age of 16. After four years in Dubnica, he signed with Slovan Bratislava in September 2009.

After a spell in Poland with Górnik Zabrze, he returned to his native Slovakia, joining Spartak Trnava in July 2018.

In June 2023, Grendel announced his retirement from football, but would continue as assistant coach at Pohronie.

== Honours ==
Slovan Bratislava

- Slovak Super Liga: 2010–11, 2012–13, 2013–14
- Slovak Cup: 2009–10, 2010–11, 2012–13
- Slovak Super Cup: 2014

Spartak Trnava

- Slovak Cup: 2018–19
