= Patrik Mráz =

Slovak footballer

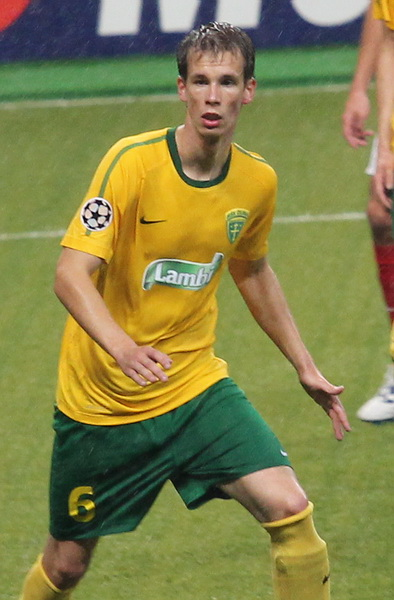

Personal information
- Full name: Patrik Mráz
- Date of birth: 1 February 1987 (age 39)
- Place of birth: Púchov, Czechoslovakia
- Height: 1.87 m (6 ft 2 in)
- Position: Left back

Team information
- Current team: MŠK Púchov
- Number: 14

Youth career
- Púchov

Senior career*
Years	Team	Apps	(Gls)
2005–2006	Púchov	34	(0)
2006–2009	Artmedia	57	(1)
2009–2011	Žilina	64	(6)
2012	Śląsk Wrocław	12	(0)
2013	Senica	12	(0)
2013–2015	Górnik Łęczna	59	(3)
2015–2017	Piast Gliwice	62	(4)
2017–2018	Sandecja Nowy Sącz	30	(1)
2018–2019	Zagłębie Sosnowiec	25	(1)
2019–	Púchov	152	(29)

International career
2007–2008	Slovakia U21	6	(0)
- * Club domestic league appearances and goals as of 25 May 2026

Patrik Mráz (born 1 February 1987) is a Slovak professional footballer who plays for Púchov.

His former clubs include Petržalka 1898, Žilina and Śląsk Wrocław. He has played for Žilina in the 2010–11 UEFA Champions League group stages. On 19 February 2013, Mráz signed half-year contract with Senica. Before his arrival back to hometown Púchov, he played for Zagłębie Sosnowiec.

== International career ==
Mráz had the opportunity to make his debut in the national team in May 2016, when he was a part of the preliminary squad for a preparatory camp in Austria, ahead of Slovakia's debut as an independent nation at the European Championship, a part of which were two friendly matches against Georgia (3–1 win) and Germany (3–1 win). He did not earn a cap in either of the games.

== Honours ==
Artmedia

- Slovak Super Liga: 2007–08
- Slovak Cup: 2007–08

MŠK Žilina

- Slovak Super Liga: 2009–10
- Slovak Super Cup: 2010

Śląsk Wrocław

- Ekstraklasa: 2011–12

Individual

- Ekstraklasa Defender of the Season: 2015–16
