= Cyril Stachura =

Slovak footballer and manager

Personal information
- Full name: Cyril Stachura
- Date of birth: 4 September 1965 (age 61)
- Place of birth: Stropkov, Czechoslovakia

Senior career*
Years	Team	Apps	(Gls)
- 1. FC Košice
- Tatran Prešov
- HFC Humenné
- Piešťany
?–2002	ŠKP Devín		

Managerial career
- Piešťany
- 2008: Spartak Trnava (assistant coach)
- 2009: FC Nitra (assistant coach)
- 2011: FC Nitra
- * Club domestic league appearances and goals as of 20 November 2011

Cyril Stachura (born 4 September 1965 in Stropkov) is a former football player from Slovakia and recently manager of FC Nitra.
