= Jaroslav Hílek =

Slovak footballer

Personal information
- Full name: Jaroslav Hílek
- Date of birth: 6 June 1978 (age 48)
- Place of birth: Czechoslovakia
- Height: 1.80 m (5 ft 11 in)
- Position: Midfielder

Team information
- Current team: ŠK SFM Senec
- Number: 12

Youth career
- ?–1992: FK Lakšárska Nová Ves

Senior career*
Years	Team	Apps	(Gls)
1992–2001	SH Senica		
2001–2003	FC Spartak Trnava		
2003–2004	SH Senica		
2004–2007	FC Rimavská Sobota		
2007–2009	SK Dynamo České Budějovice	41	(0)
2009–2010	MFK Petržalka	29	(0)
2010–2012	DAC Dunajská Streda	49	(1)
2012–	Žižkov	26	(0)
2013–	→ SFM Senec (loan)	19	(0)
- * Club domestic league appearances and goals as of 31 August 2013

Jaroslav Hílek (born 6 June 1978) is a Slovak football player who currently plays for ŠK SFM Senec, on loan from FK Viktoria Žižkov.
