= Filip Šebo =

Slovak footballer

Personal information
- Date of birth: 24 February 1984 (age 42)
- Place of birth: Bratislava, Czechoslovakia
- Height: 1.81 m (5 ft 11 in)
- Position: Forward

Youth career
- Inter Bratislava

Senior career*
Years	Team	Apps	(Gls)
2001–2003	1. FC Köln II	50	(25)
2003–2004	Inter Bratislava	30	(8)
2004–2005	Petržalka	33	(22)
2005–2006	Austria Wien	32	(6)
2006–2008	Rangers	24	(2)
2007–2008	→ Valenciennes (loan)	32	(4)
2008–2010	Valenciennes	30	(2)
2010–2012	Slovan Bratislava	53	(29)
2015–2016	Petržalka	9	(9)
Total		293	(107)

International career
2006–2012	Slovakia	15	(7)
Medal record
Slovakia U19
Bronze medal – third place	UEFA European Under-19 Football Championship	2002
Artmedia Bratislava
Winner	Slovak Cup	2004
Winner	Corgoň Liga	2005
Winner	Slovak Super Cup	2005
Austria Vienna
Winner	Austrian Football Bundesliga	2006
Winner	Austrian Cup	2006
Slovan Bratislava
Winner	Corgoň Liga	2011
Winner	Slovak Cup	2011
- * Club domestic league appearances and goals

Filip Šebo (born 24 February 1984) is a Slovak former professional footballer who played as a forward.

== Club career ==
=== Early career ===
Šebo started his professional career with German team 1. FC Köln but did not make a first team appearance, playing his games for reserve side Köln II. He returned to Slovakia joining Inter Bratislava in 2003 after being released by Köln. Eight goals in 25 appearances earned him a transfer to Artmedia Bratislava – known for their run in the 2005–06 UEFA Champions League.

In the summer of 2005, after 22 goals in 29 games and the award for the league's top-scorer, he was bought by Austrian side Austria Vienna who paid approximately £400,000 for him. Šebo played 32 times, scoring 5 goals for the Austrian side, helping them to achieve an Austrian Bundesliga and Cup double.

=== Rangers ===
Rangers manager Paul Le Guen made Šebo his ninth signing on 3 August 2006 after Austria Vienna and Rangers agreed a fee of £1.85 million. Le Guen gave him his first starting appearance for Rangers on 17 September, against Hibernian in an SPL match, and he scored. His first home goal came on 1 October, a late winner in a 1–0 victory over Aberdeen at Ibrox. Šebo played his first European match for Rangers on 28 September, playing the last 15 minutes of a UEFA Cup first-round second-leg tie against Molde FK. Rangers won, 2–0, to qualify for the group stage. Despite his lack of goals, he became something of a cult figure for Rangers, due to both his high workrate and his distinctive broad, stocky build.

In a friendly against Airdrie United on 31 January 2007, Šebo scored in a 3–0 win, his first goal in three months for the club. In another friendly, he scored a hat-trick in a 5–0 defeat of Gretna. In July 2007, Šebo scored Rangers' second goal in a 2–0 pre-season friendly win over Chelsea; it was his first goal at Ibrox in almost 10 months.

=== Valenciennes ===
On 22 August 2007, Šebo joined French Ligue 1 side Valenciennes on a year-long loan deal. He scored his first goal for Valenciennes in a Coupe de la Ligue match against Sochaux on 27 September 2007. He netted his first and second league goals on 11 November against Caen.

He completed a permanent switch to France on 29 May 2008, with Valenciennes paying a fee of around one million pounds.

=== Slovan Bratislava ===
Šebo joined Slovan Bratislava on 15 September 2010. The striker, who came as a free agent after his spell at Valenciennes, signed a contract with the Slovak side until December 2012. Šebo impressed in his first season at Slovan, becoming the Corgoň liga's top scorer with 22 goals. Following the successful campaign, the Bundesliga club Hannover 96 tried to sign Šebo, but failed, as Slovan decided against selling the striker. Although Šebo was less prolific in his remaining time at the club, Slovan offered him a new contract, which the striker, however, turned down and left the club in the winter of 2012.

=== Petržalka ===
Šebo joined Petržalka akadémia on 2015 as a free agent.

== International career ==
On 15 August 2006, Šebo made his debut for the Slovakia national team in a friendly against Malta. He marked the occasion by scoring a hat-trick. He scored another two goals in his second international match against Cyprus.

=== International goals ===
Scores and results list Slovakia's goal tally first.

#	Date	Venue	Opponent	Score	Result	Competition
1	15 August 2006	Tehelné pole, Bratislava	Malta	1–0	3–0	Friendly
2	15 August 2006	Tehelné pole, Bratislava	Malta	2–0	3–0	Friendly
3	15 August 2006	Tehelné pole, Bratislava	Malta	3–0	3–0	Friendly
4	2 September 2006	Tehelné pole, Bratislava	Cyprus	3–0	6–1	UEFA Euro 2008 qualifying
5	2 September 2006	Tehelné pole, Bratislava	Cyprus	4–0	6–1	UEFA Euro 2008 qualifying
6	17 November 2010	Štadión Pasienky, Bratislava	Bosnia and Herzegovina	1–0	2–3	Friendly
7	26 March 2011	Communal d'Aixovall, Andorra La Vella	Andorra	1–0	1–0	UEFA Euro 2012 qualifying

== Honours ==
=== Slovakia ===
Slovakia U20

- 2003 FIFA U-20 World Cup: Participation

Slovakia U19

- 2002 UEFA European Under-19 Football Championship – Third place
