= Ondřej Šourek =

Czech footballer (born 1983)

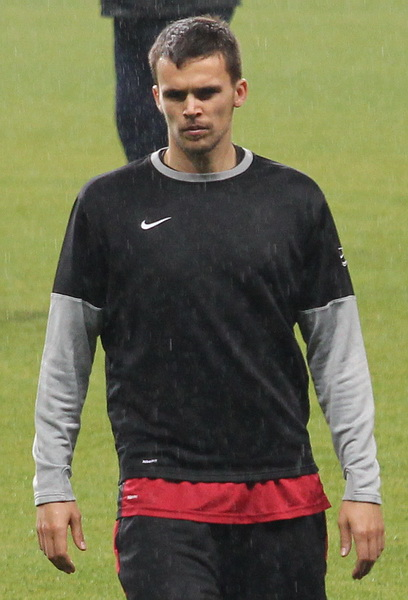

Personal information
- Full name: Ondřej Šourek
- Date of birth: 26 April 1983 (age 43)
- Place of birth: Ledeč nad Sázavou, Czechoslovakia
- Height: 1.87 m (6 ft 1 1/2 in)
- Position: Centre-back

Youth career
- 1990–1994: Kovofiniš Ledeč nad Sázavou
- 1994–1996: Slovan Havlíčkův Brod
- 1996–2002: Vysočina Jihlava

Senior career*
Years	Team	Apps	(Gls)
2002–2007	Vysočina Jihlava	129	(4)
2007–2008	Slavia Prague	2	(1)
2008–2011	Žilina	73	(5)
2011–2012	Podbeskidzie Bielsko-Biała	12	(1)
2012–2016	Vysočina Jihlava	72	(3)
2016–2017	Dynamo České Budějovice	26	(0)
2017	SC Wieselburg		

International career
2003	Czech Republic U20	1	(0)
2004	Czech Republic U21	2	(0)
- * Club domestic league appearances and goals

Ondřej Šourek (born 26 April 1983) is a Czech former professional footballer who played as a centre-back.

== Career ==
=== Club ===
In May 2011, he joined Polish club Podbeskidzie Bielsko-Biała on a two-year contract.

=== International ===
He was a part of Czech Republic U-20 and U-21 teams.

== Honours ==
Slavia Prague

- Czech First League: 2007–08

Žilina

- Slovak First Football League: 2009–10
- Slovak Super Cup: 2010
