= Róbert Jež =

Slovak footballer (born 1981)

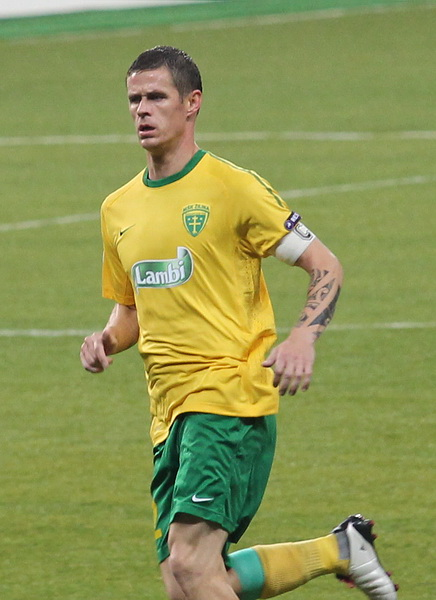

Personal information
- Full name: Róbert Jež
- Date of birth: 10 July 1981 (age 45)
- Place of birth: Nitra, Czechoslovakia
- Height: 1.78 m (5 ft 10 in)
- Position: Midfielder

Team information
- Current team: Podkonice (head coach); Pohronie (general manager)

Youth career
- Nitra

Senior career*
Years	Team	Apps	(Gls)
1999–2000	Nitra	28	(5)
2000–2005	Viktoria Plzeň	84	(9)
2004	→ Příbram (loan)	5	(0)
2005–2010	Žilina	172	(35)
2011	Górnik Zabrze	14	(5)
2011–2012	Polonia Warsaw	21	(2)
2012–2013	Zagłębie Lubin	40	(4)
2014–2015	Górnik Zabrze	56	(5)
2014–2015	Górnik Zabrze II	2	(1)
2016	Spartak Trnava	13	(2)

International career
2007–2012	Slovakia	9	(3)

Managerial career
- 2017–2019: TJ Imeľ
- 2023: Pohronie (assistant)
- 2024: Podkonice
- 2025: Pohronie (carateker)
- 2026-: Pohronie (carateker)
- * Club domestic league appearances and goals

Róbert Jež (born 10 July 1981) is a Slovak professional football manager, executive and former player who played as a midfielder. He is currently in charge of Podkonice, and the general manager of Pohronie.

== Playing career ==
=== Club ===
Jež began playing football at his local club Nitra. He made his first team debut in the 1999–2000 season but next season he moved to Gambrinus liga club Viktoria Plzeň. He spent in Viktoria five seasons besides half-year loan for Marila Příbram in autumn 2004. In July 2005, he signed for Žilina where he won the Corgoň Liga title twice. He became a club captain after Zdeno Štrba's transfer to Skoda Xanthi in July 2009. He qualified with Žilina to the 2010–11 UEFA Champions League and played all 6 group games.

In February 2011, he joined Polish Ekstraklasa club Górnik Zabrze. After 14 matches and 5 goals for Górnik he signed a 3-year contract for Polonia Warsaw in June 2011.

On 28 June 2016, Jež has announced his retirement from football due to persistent problems with his back.

=== International ===
Róbert's international debut for Slovakia came in second half of a game against Croatia on 16 October 2007. He scored his first international goal against Liechtenstein on 19 November 2008.

Scores and results list Slovakia's goal tally first, score column indicates score after each Jež goal.

List of international goals scored by Róbert Jež
No.	Date	Venue	Opponent	Score	Result	Competition
1	19 November 2008	Štadión Pod Dubňom, Žilina, Slovakia	Liechtenstein	4–0	4–0	Friendly
2	11 February 2009	Makario Stadium, Nicosia, Cyprus	Cyprus	1–3	2–3	Cyprus International Tournament 2009
3	10 August 2011	Hypo-Arena, Klagenfurt, Austria	Austria	2–0	2–1	Friendly

== Managerial career ==
On 3 June 2019, FK Pohronie announced on their Facebook page, that Jež would join the club as a sporting director, after the club's first historic promotion into Fortuna Liga. He only spent 4 months with the team before his release. Jež returned to Pohronie in February 2023 to serve as an assistant to Rastislav Urgela with the club competing in 2. Liga once more.

In January 2024, Jež was appointed head coach of 3. Liga club Podkonice.

== Honours ==
Žilina

- Slovak Super Liga: 2006–07, 2009–10
- Slovak Super Cup: 2007, 2010
