= Tomáš Majtán =

Slovak footballer

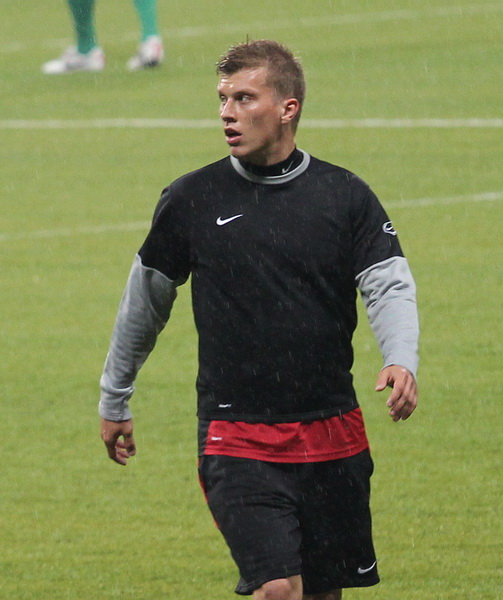

Personal information
- Full name: Tomáš Majtán
- Date of birth: 30 March 1987 (age 39)
- Place of birth: Bratislava, Czechoslovakia
- Height: 1.80 m (5 ft 11 in)
- Position: Forward

Team information
- Current team: Inter Bratislava

Youth career
- Inter Bratislava

Senior career*
Years	Team	Apps	(Gls)
2006–2009	Inter Bratislava		
2009	→ Petržalka (loan)	32	(6)
2010–2013	Žilina	108	(29)
2012	→ Baník Ostrava (loan)	9	(3)
2014	Górnik Zabrze	5	(0)
2014–2015	Senica	20	(4)
2015–2016	Spartak Trnava	19	(1)
2016–2017	Příbram	16	(1)
2017	Racing Roma	15	(1)
2017	Mezőkövesd	6	(0)
2018	Skalica	14	(0)
2018–2019	ASK-BSC Bruck/Leitha	26	(10)
2019–2023	Inter Bratislava		
2023–2024	SV 7023 Z-S-P	14	(3)
2024–	Inter Bratislava		

International career
2007–2008	Slovakia U21	13	(1)
- * Club domestic league appearances and goals as of 30 March 2024

Tomáš Majtán (born 30 March 1987) is a Slovak footballer who plays as a forward for Inter Bratislava.

== Club career ==
Majtán scored 16 goals for Inter Bratislava in the 2007–08 Second Division season and became a top goalscorer. In the same season he scored 6 goals in two consecutive games. On 5 February 2010, he signed a 3.5-year contract for Žilina. He scored his first goal for Žilina in his debut against Dubnica on 27 February 2010. He won the Corgoň Liga title in 2009–10, scoring 4 goals for his new club. On 8 December 2010, Majtán scored his first UEFA Champions League goal, opening the score in their 1–2 home defeat against Spartak Moscow.

== Club statistics ==
Club	Season	League		Cup		Europe		Total	
Club	Season	Apps	Goals	Apps	Goals	Apps	Goals	Apps	Goals
Petržalka
Petržalka	2009–10	17	4	1	1	–	–	18	5
Petržalka	Total	17	4	1	1	0	0	18	5
Žilina
Žilina	2009–10	11	4	0	0	–	–	11	4
Žilina	2010–11	30	11	4	2	12	2	48	15
Žilina	2011–12	28	9	3	1	2	1	33	11
Žilina	2012–13	21	3	3	1	2	0	26	4
Žilina	2013–14	18	2	2	1	6	4	26	7
Žilina	Total	108	29	12	5	22	7	144	41
Baník Ostrava
Baník Ostrava	2012–13	9	3	0	0	–	–	9	3
Baník Ostrava	Total	9	3	0	0	0	0	9	3
Górnik Zabrze
Górnik Zabrze	2013–14	5	0	2	1	–	–	7	1
Górnik Zabrze	Total	5	0	2	1	0	0	7	1
Senica
Senica	2014–15	20	4	5	1	–	–	25	5
Senica	Total	20	4	5	1	0	0	25	5
Trnava
Trnava	2015–16	19	1	2	1	–	–	21	2
Trnava	Total	19	1	2	1	0	0	21	2
Příbram
Příbram	2016–17	16	1	0	0	–	–	16	1
Příbram	Total	16	1	0	0	0	0	16	1
Racing Roma
Racing Roma	2016–17	15	1	0	0	–	–	15	1
Racing Roma	Total	15	1	0	0	0	0	15	1
Mezőkövesd
Mezőkövesd	2017–18	6	0	2	3	–	–	8	3
Mezőkövesd	Total	6	0	2	3	0	0	8	3
Career Total		215	43	24	12	22	7	263	62

Updated to games played as of 9 December 2017.

== Honours ==
Žilina

- Slovak Super Liga: 2009–10, 2011–12
- Slovak Cup: 2011–12
- Slovak Super Cup: 2010

Górnik Zabrze II

- Polish Cup (Zabrze regionals): 2013–14

Individual

- 2. Liga top scorer: 2007–08
