= Martin Dobrotka =

Slovak football defender

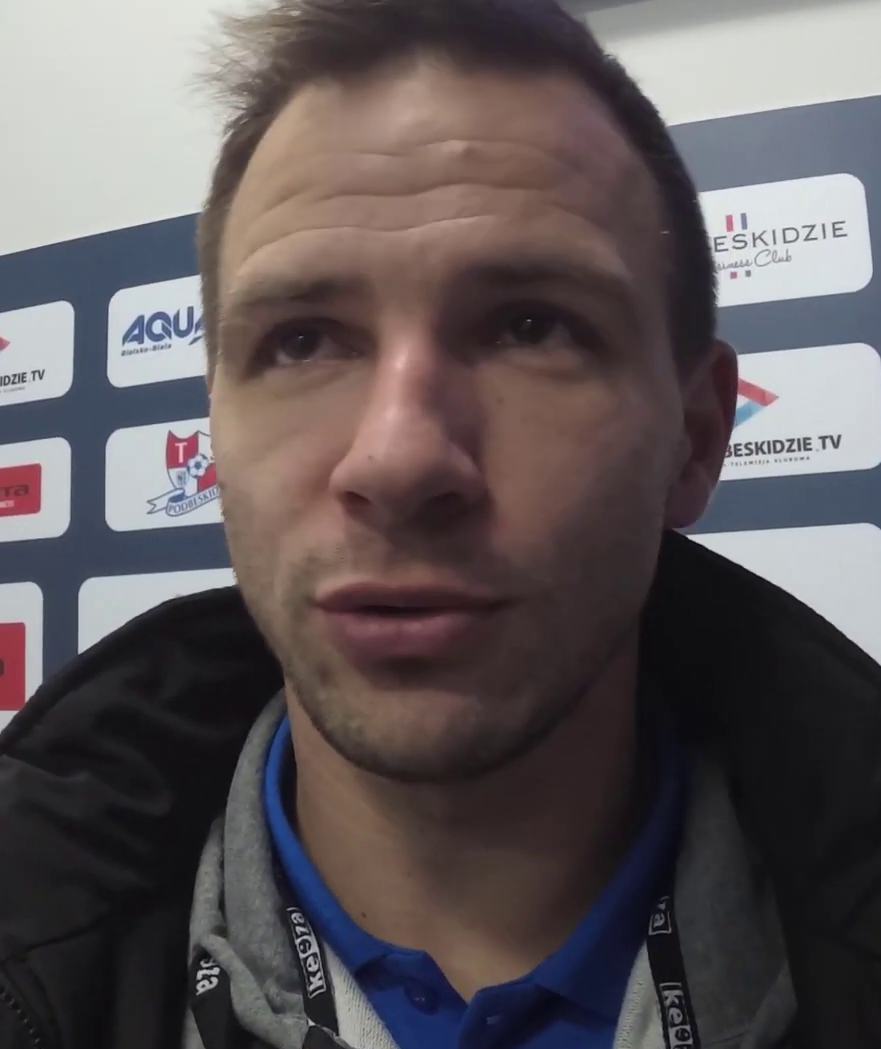
- Dobrotka in 2020

Personal information
- Full name: Martin Dobrotka
- Date of birth: 22 January 1985 (age 41)
- Place of birth: Bratislava, Czechoslovakia
- Height: 1.83 m (6 ft 0 in)
- Position: Centre-back

Youth career
- Slovan Bratislava

Senior career*
Years	Team	Apps	(Gls)
2003	Slovan Bratislava	0	(0)
2004–2006	České Budějovice	7	(0)
2005–2006	→ Rimavská Sobota (loan)		
2006–2012	Slovan Bratislava	145	(12)
2012–2014	Slavia Prague	32	(2)
2015	Slovan Bratislava	4	(0)
2016	Skalica	14	(2)
2016	Baník Ostrava	0	(0)
2017	Baník Sokolov	8	(0)
2017	Zlaté Moravce	14	(0)
2018–2020	Stal Mielec	48	(7)
2020–2021	Wigry Suwałki	44	(3)
2021–2025	Arka Gdynia	85	(3)
2025–2026	Pohronie	24	(1)

International career
2004	Slovakia U19	1	(0)
2009	Slovakia	1	(0)
- * Club domestic league appearances and goals

Martin Dobrotka (born 22 January 1985) is a Slovak former professional footballer who played as a centre-back.

== Club career ==
Dobrotka spent a year and a half in the Czech Gambrinus liga with SK Dynamo České Budějovice and also one season in FC Rimavská Sobota. On 23 April 2011, while playing for Slovan Bratislava, he scored a goal remarkably similar to Maradona's 'Hand of God' goal against England in the 1986 World Cup. He scored the winning goal with his hand in an away league match against FC Nitra in the 89th minute.

== International career ==
He made his first appearance Slovakia national team on 11 February 2009 against Cyprus in Limassol.

== Career statistics ==
=== International ===
Appearances and goals by national team and year
National team	Year	Apps	Goals
Slovakia
Slovakia	2009	1	0
Total		1	0

== Honours ==
Slovan Bratislava

- Slovak Superliga: 2008–09, 2010–11
- Slovak Cup: 2009–10, 2010–11
- Slovak Super Cup: 2009

Arka Gdynia

- I liga: 2024–25
