= Momodou Ceesay =

Gambian footballer (born 1988)

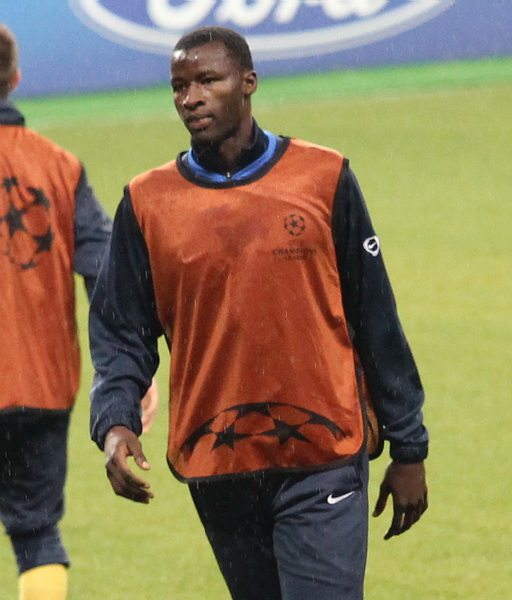
- Ceesay in 2010

Personal information
- Date of birth: 24 December 1988 (age 37)
- Place of birth: Banjul, Gambia
- Height: 1.96 m (6 ft 5 in)
- Position: Forward

Youth career
- 2006–2007: Wallidan
- 2007–2008: Grasshopper Zürich
- 2008: Chelsea

Senior career*
Years	Team	Apps	(Gls)
2008	Chelsea	0	(0)
2008–2010	Westerlo	28	(0)
2010–2012	Žilina	58	(7)
2013–2015	Kairat Almaty	46	(18)
2015	Maccabi Netanya	11	(1)
2016	Žilina	5	(0)
2017	PS Kemi	26	(5)
2018	Kyzylzhar	14	(3)
2019	Irtysh Pavlodar	9	(0)
2019–2020	Kyzylzhar	27	(8)
Total		224	(42)

International career
2005	Gambia U17		
2010–2015	Gambia	16	(6)
- * Club domestic league appearances and goals

Momodou Ceesay (born 24 December 1988) is a Gambian former professional footballer who played as a forward. He played for the Gambia national team internationally.

== Club career ==
Ceesay started his football career playing for his home town club of Kanifing United. Ceesay came to Žilina in summer 2010 signing half-year contract and he scored in his first the Corgoň Liga match on 31 July 2010. He expressively helped to promotion of Žilina to the 2010–11 UEFA Champions League, scoring three goals in the qualifying rounds.

Ceesay left Kairat Almaty on 7 July 2015, after his contract was terminated by mutual consent. In September 2015 he signed for Maccabi Netanya

On 28 June 2018, Kyzylzhar announced the signing of Ceesay.

On 18 June 2019, Ceesay was released by Irtysh Pavlodar, returning to Kyzylzhar in July 2019.

== International career ==
Ceesay made his debut for the Gambia national team against Mexico on 30 May 2010. In his second international match he scored his first goal for Gambia against Namibia on 4 September 2010.

== Personal life ==
Ceesay's younger brother, Ali, was also a professional footballer. He last played for Skonto Rīga in the Latvian Higher League in 2014.

== Career statistics ==
Scores and results list Gambia's goal tally first.

#	Date	Venue	Opponent	Score	Result	Competition
1.	4 September 2010	Independence Stadium, Bakau	Namibia	2–0	3–1	2012 Africa Cup of Nations qualifier
2.	9 February 2011	Estádio do Restelo, Lisbon	Guinea-Bissau	1–0	1–3	Friendly
3.	10 August 2011	Independence Stadium, Bakau	DR Congo	3–0	3–0	Friendly
4.	29 February 2012	Independence Stadium, Bakau	Algeria	1–0	1–2	2013 Africa Cup of Nations qualifier
5.	10 June 2012	Benjamin Mkapa National Stadium, Dar es Salaam	Tanzania	1–0	1–2	2014 FIFA World Cup qualifier
6.	20 January 2013	Stade Général Seyni Kountché, Niamey	Niger	3–1	3–1	Friendly

== Honours ==
MŠK Žilina

- Slovak First League: 2011–12
- Slovak Cup: 2011–12; runner-up: 2010–11

Kairat

- Kazakhstan Cup: 2014

Gambia U17

- African U-17 Championship: 2005
