= Karim Guédé =

Slovak footballer (born 1985)

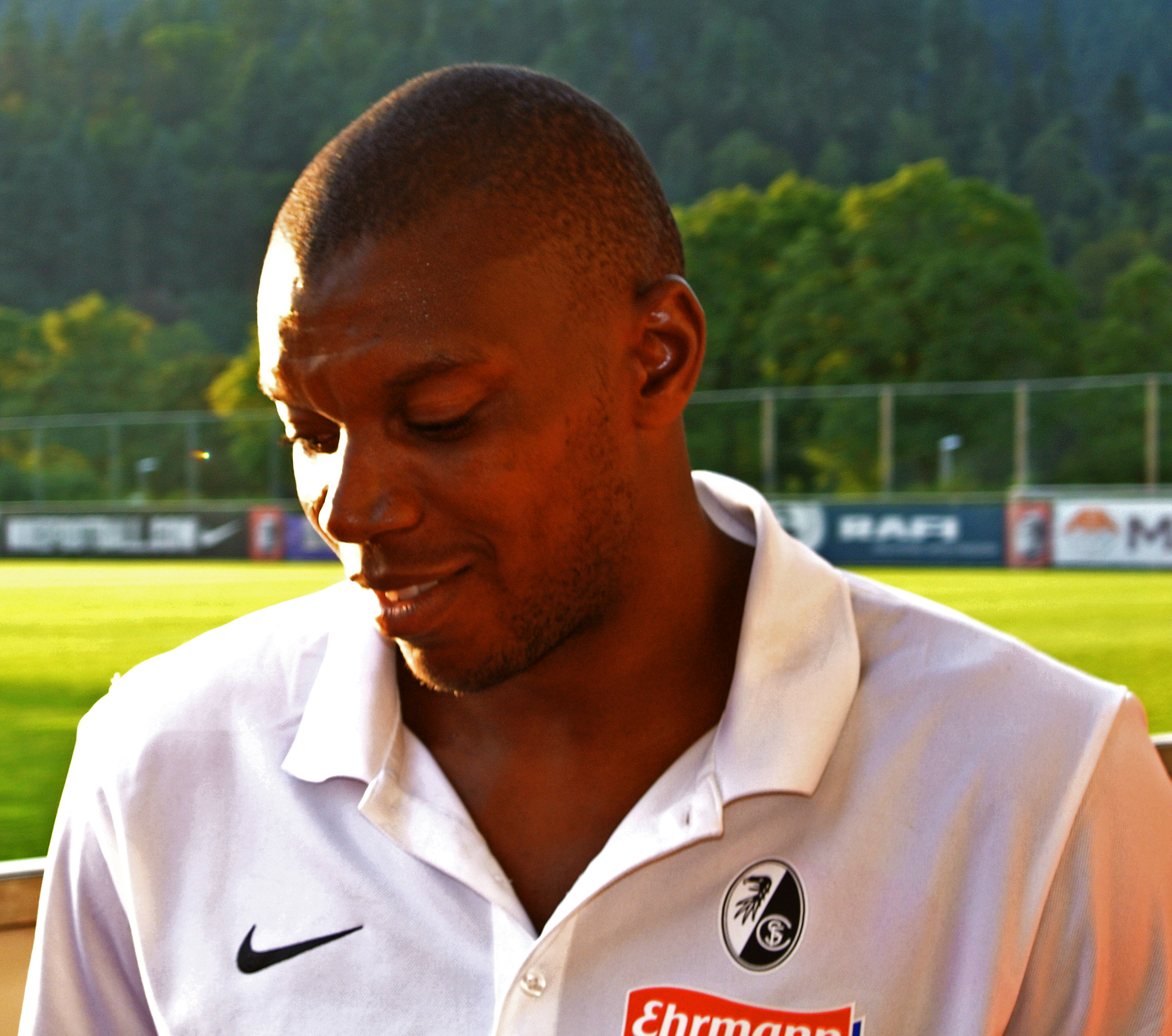
- Guédé in 2013

Personal information
- Full name: Karim Abdul-Jabbar Guédé
- Date of birth: 7 January 1985 (age 41)
- Place of birth: Hamburg, West Germany
- Height: 1.84 m (6 ft 0 in)
- Position: Midfielder

Team information
- Current team: SC Freiburg (scout)

Youth career
- SC Hamm 02
- FC St. Pauli
- 2002–2003: SC Concordia

Senior career*
Years	Team	Apps	(Gls)
2003–2004	SC Concordia	24	(0)
2004–2006	Hamburger SV II	24	(0)
2006–2009	Petržalka	88	(9)
2010–2011	Slovan Bratislava	60	(10)
2012–2018	SC Freiburg	102	(7)
2018–2019	SV Sandhausen	9	(0)
Total		307	(26)

International career
2011–2014	Slovakia	14	(0)
- * Club domestic league appearances and goals

Karim Abdul-Jabbar Guédé (born 7 January 1985) is a former professional footballer who works as a scout for SC Freiburg. He started his career at the amateur level with SC Concordia and Hamburger SV II. After impressing at Slovak clubs Petržalka and Slovan Bratislava, he joined SC Freiburg, where he spent six seasons. He ended his career after one season with SV Sandhausen. Born in West Germany, he played for the Slovakia national team.

== Club career ==
Guédé, born in Hamburg, is a son of Togolese mother and Afro-French father. After playing for the Oberliga Hamburg club SC Concordia von 1907 and Hamburger SV II he came to Artmedia Petržalka in July 2006. He made his Corgoň Liga debut in a 4–0 defeat against Trenčín on 9 September 2006. He began playing as a defensive midfielder in Artmedia, previously he played as a defender. In the next season he won the Double. He moved to ŠK Slovan Bratislava in January 2010. In his first season in a new club he won the Slovak Cup. He won his second Slovak Double in 2010–11.

In May 2018, Guédé left SC Freiburg after six seasons with the club.

In June, Guédé joined 2. Bundesliga side SV Sandhausen on a free transfer having agreed a one-year contract.

== International career ==
Guédé was named in the Togo national team squad for the 2006 FIFA World Cup under head coach Otto Pfister, but was replaced in the squad shortly before the start of the tournament by Franck Atsou after being diagnosed with an injury to his back – or shoulder. After five years in Slovakia, Guédé obtained Slovak citizenship in 2011 and became eligible for Slovakia under manager Vladimír Weiss. He made his Slovakia national team debut in a 2–1 away win against Austria in Klagenfurt am Wörthersee on 10 August 2011.

== After retirement ==
After retiring at the end of the 2018–19 season, Guédé returned to SC Freiburg, where he was hired as a scout in France and Africa.

== Honours ==
Artmedia

- Corgoň Liga: 2007–08
- Slovak Cup: 2007–08

Slovan

- Corgoň Liga: 2010–11
- Slovak Cup: 2009–10, 2010–11
