= Róbert Pich =

Slovak footballer

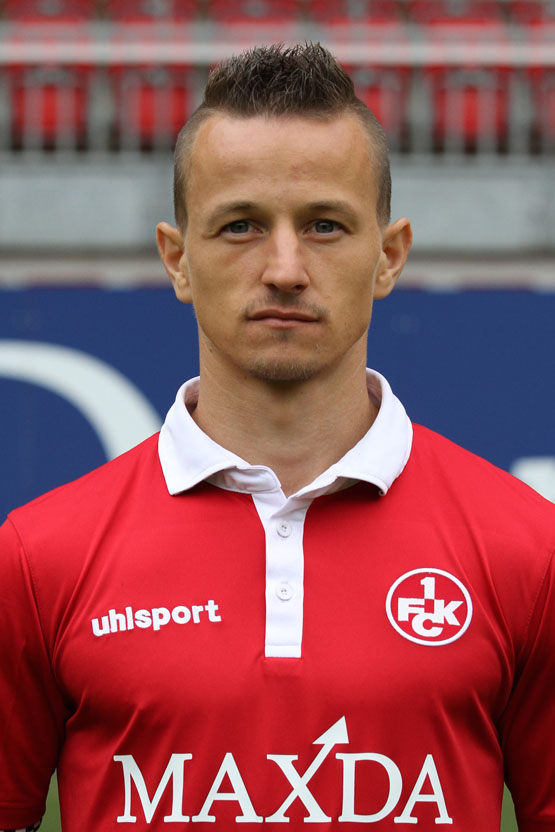
- Robert Pich with Kaiserslautern in 2015

Personal information
- Date of birth: 12 November 1988 (age 38)
- Place of birth: Svidník, Czechoslovakia
- Height: 1.73 m (5 ft 8 in)
- Position: Winger

Team information
- Current team: Nitra

Youth career
- Tesla Stropkov
- 2007–2008: Slavia Prague

Senior career*
Years	Team	Apps	(Gls)
2008–2009	ŽP Šport Podbrezová	12	(7)
2009–2010	Dukla Banská Bystrica	47	(10)
2011–2013	Žilina	90	(29)
2014–2015	Śląsk Wrocław	57	(14)
2015–2016	Kaiserslautern	7	(0)
2016	→ Śląsk Wrocław (loan)	16	(0)
2017–2022	Śląsk Wrocław	180	(39)
2022–2024	Legia Warsaw	17	(0)
2023–2024	Legia Warsaw II	10	(5)
2024	Othellos Athienou	22	(7)
2024–2025	Spartak Trnava	24	(2)
2025–	Nitra	30	(8)

International career
2010	Slovakia U21	1	(0)
- * Club domestic league appearances and goals as of 17 May 2025

Róbert Pich (born 12 November 1988) is a Slovak professional footballer who plays as a winger for FC Nitra.

In 2025, Pich won the 2024–25 Slovak Cup with Spartak Trnava, featuring on the bench in the final where his team won 1–0 against MFK Ružomberok.

== Club career ==
=== MŠK Žilina ===
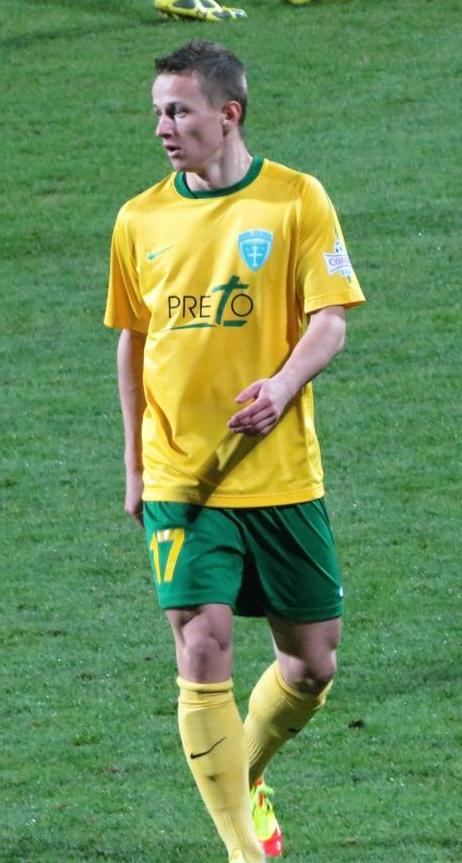
Pich playing for MŠK Žilina

In December 2010, Pich has signed a three-and-a-half-year contract for Žilina to join them on 1 February 2011.

=== Legia Warsaw ===
In June 2022, Pich joined Polish Ekstraklasa club Legia Warsaw. On 4 January 2024, he terminated his contract with the club by mutual consent.

=== Spartak Trnava ===
On 8 July 2024, it was announced that Pich would be joining Slovak club Spartak Trnava, signing a 6 month contract with an option for another 6. He made his debut for Spartak on 31 July 2024 in a 3–0 win over FK Sarajevo in the Conference League. Coming on as a substitute for Michal Ďuriš in the 75th minute, Pich was able to assist a goal scored by Patrick Karhan. He made his league debut for Spartak in a 0–0 draw against AS Trenčín, starting the match. Pich scored his 100th league goal in his career in a 2–1 away win against Železiarne Podbrezová. He left Spartak with 2 goals and 2 assist in 24 league games.

=== FC Nitra ===
In the summer of 2025, it was announced that Pich would be joining FC Nitra alongside Spartak teammate Lukáš Štetina. Pich impressed with his performances, scoring 2 goals in his first 4 games for the club.

== International career ==
Pich was called up to the senior Slovakia squad for a 2018 FIFA World Cup qualifier against England in September 2016.

== Career statistics ==
As of match played 7 April 2018

Appearances and goals by club, season and competition
Club	Season	League			National cup (Note: Includes Slovak Cup, Polish Cup)		Europe		Other		Total	
Club	Season	Division	Apps	Goals	Apps	Goals	Apps	Goals	Apps	Goals	Apps	Goals
Dukla	2009–10	Slovak Superliga	29	3	4	0	—		—		33	3
Dukla	2010–11	Slovak Superliga	18	7	0	0	2 (Note: Appearances in UEFA Europa League)	0	—		20	7
Dukla	Total		47	10	4	0	2	0	0	0	53	10
Žilina	2010–11	Slovak Superliga	10	1	3	0	—		—		13	1
Žilina	2011–12	Slovak First Football League	29	10	6	0	2	0	—		37	10
Žilina	2012–13	Slovak First Football League	33	11	6	3	2 (Note: Appearances in UEFA Champions League)	0	—		41	15
Žilina	2013–14	Slovak First Football League	18	7	3	1	6	3	—		27	11
Žilina	Total		90	29	18	4	10	3	0	0	118	36
Śląsk Wrocław	2013–14	Ekstraklasa	13	0	0	0	—		—		13	0
Śląsk Wrocław	2014–15	Ekstraklasa	37	10	4	0	—		—		41	10
Śląsk Wrocław	2015–16	Ekstraklasa	7	4	0	0	4	1	—		11	5
Śląsk Wrocław	Total		57	14	4	0	4	1	0	0	65	15
1. FC Kaiserslautern	2015–16	2. Bundesliga	4	0	0	0	—		—		4	0
1. FC Kaiserslautern	2016–17	2. Bundesliga	3	0	0	0	—		—		3	0
1. FC Kaiserslautern	Total		7	0	0	0	0	0	0	0	7	0
Śląsk Wrocław (loan)	2015–16	Ekstraklasa	16	0	0	0	—		—		16	0
Śląsk Wrocław	2016–17	Ekstraklasa	17	7	0	0	—		—		17	7
Śląsk Wrocław	2017–18	Ekstraklasa	28	4	0	0	—		—		28	4
Śląsk Wrocław	Total		45	11	0	0	0	0	0	0	45	11
Career total			262	64	26	4	16	4	0	0	304	72

== Honours ==
Žilina

- Slovak First League: 2011–12
- Slovak Cup: 2011–12

Legia Warsaw

- Polish Cup: 2022–23

Spartak Trnava

- Slovak Cup: 2024–25

Individual

- Ekstraklasa Player of the Month: July 2021
