= Pavol Poliaček =

Slovak footballer

Personal information
- Date of birth: 4 February 1988 (age 38)
- Place of birth: Žilina, Czechoslovakia
- Height: 1.76 m (5 ft 9 1/2 in)
- Position: Centre midfielder

Team information
- Current team: SK Bela

Youth career
- Žilina

Senior career*
Years	Team	Apps	(Gls)
2007–2013	Žilina	25	(0)
2010	→ Dubnica (loan)	11	(2)
2011–2012	→ Ostrava (loan)	18	(0)
2012	→ Ružiná (loan)		
2013	České Budějovice	9	(1)
2014–2015	Stord		
2015–2016	TJ Stráža		
2016	→ Banská Bystrica (loan)	10	(0)
2016	FC Brig-Glis		
2017	SV Waidhofen/Thaya	1	(0)
2017–2019	SC Kirchberg/Pielach		
2020–2022	TSU Hafnerbach		
2022	SV Pöchlarn-Golling		
2023	WSV Traisen		
2024–	SK Bela		

International career
2010	Slovakia U-21	1	(0)
- * Club domestic league appearances and goals as of 19 May 2017

Pavol Poliaček (born 4 February 1988) is a Slovak football midfielder who plays for SK Bela.
