= Tomáš Hrdlička =

Czech footballer

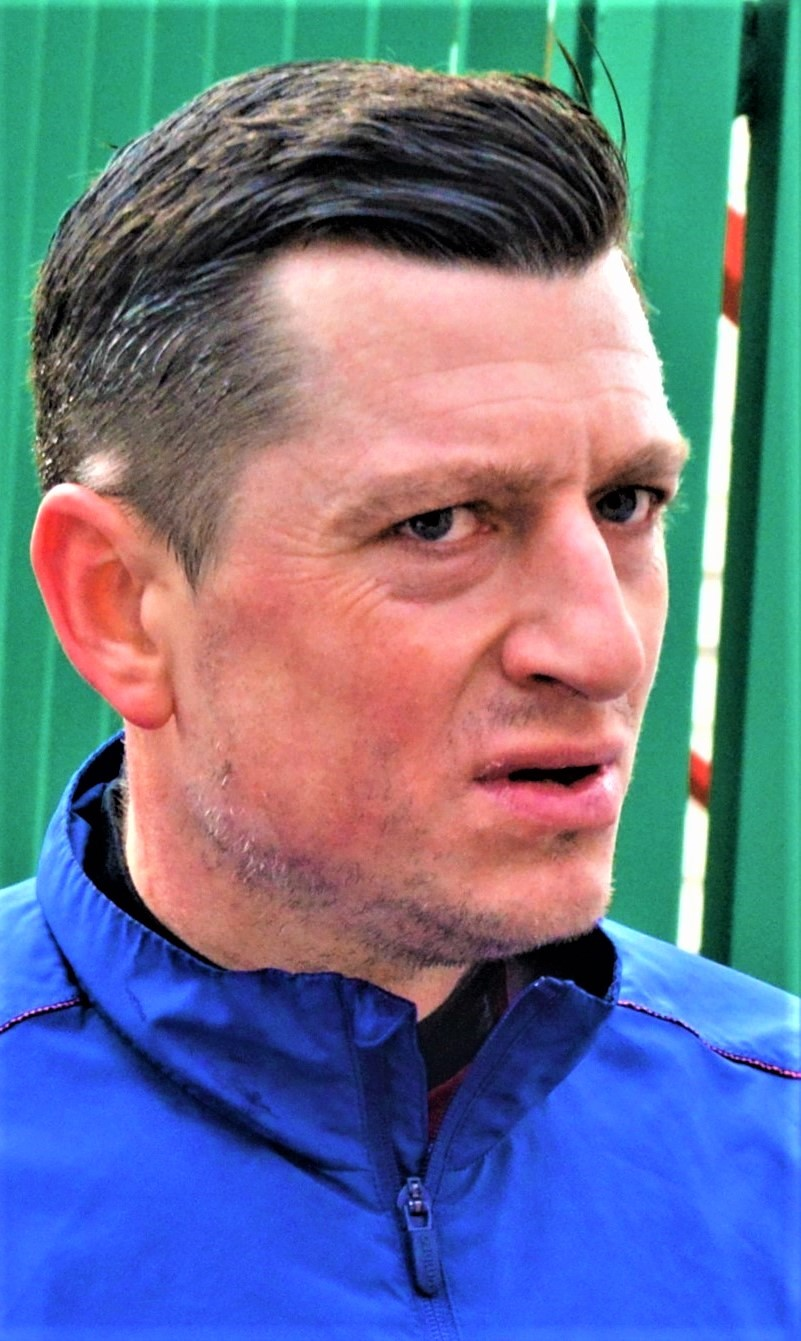
- Tomáš Hrdlička 2018

Personal information
- Full name: Tomáš Hrdlička
- Date of birth: 17 February 1982 (age 44)
- Place of birth: Prague, Czechoslovakia
- Height: 1.84 m (6 ft 1/2 in)
- Positions: Left back; midfielder

Senior career*
| Years | Team | Apps | (Gls) |
| 2001–2007 | Slavia Prague | 105 | (10) |
| 2007–2010 | Mladá Boleslav | 47 | (2) |
| 2009 | → Bohemians 1905 (loan) | 8 | (0) |
| 2011 | Slovan Bratislava | 14 | (0) |

International career
| 2002–2003 | Czech Republic U21 | 12 | (1) |
Medal record
Men's football
Representing Czech Republic
UEFA European Under-21 Championship
| Winner | 2002 Switzerland |
- * Club domestic league appearances and goals as of 2 September 2011

Tomáš Hrdlička (born 17 February 1982) is a Czech football defender who recently played as a defender for the Corgoň Liga club Slovan Bratislava. He spent most of his teenage years playing in the Slavia Prague youth setup making his senior debut aged twenty. He moved to FK Mladá Boleslav in 2007 on a free transfer.

He has also represented the Czech Republic internationally at the under-21s level, winning a gold medal with the U21 team in the 2002 European championship.
