= Štefan Zošák =

Slovak footballer

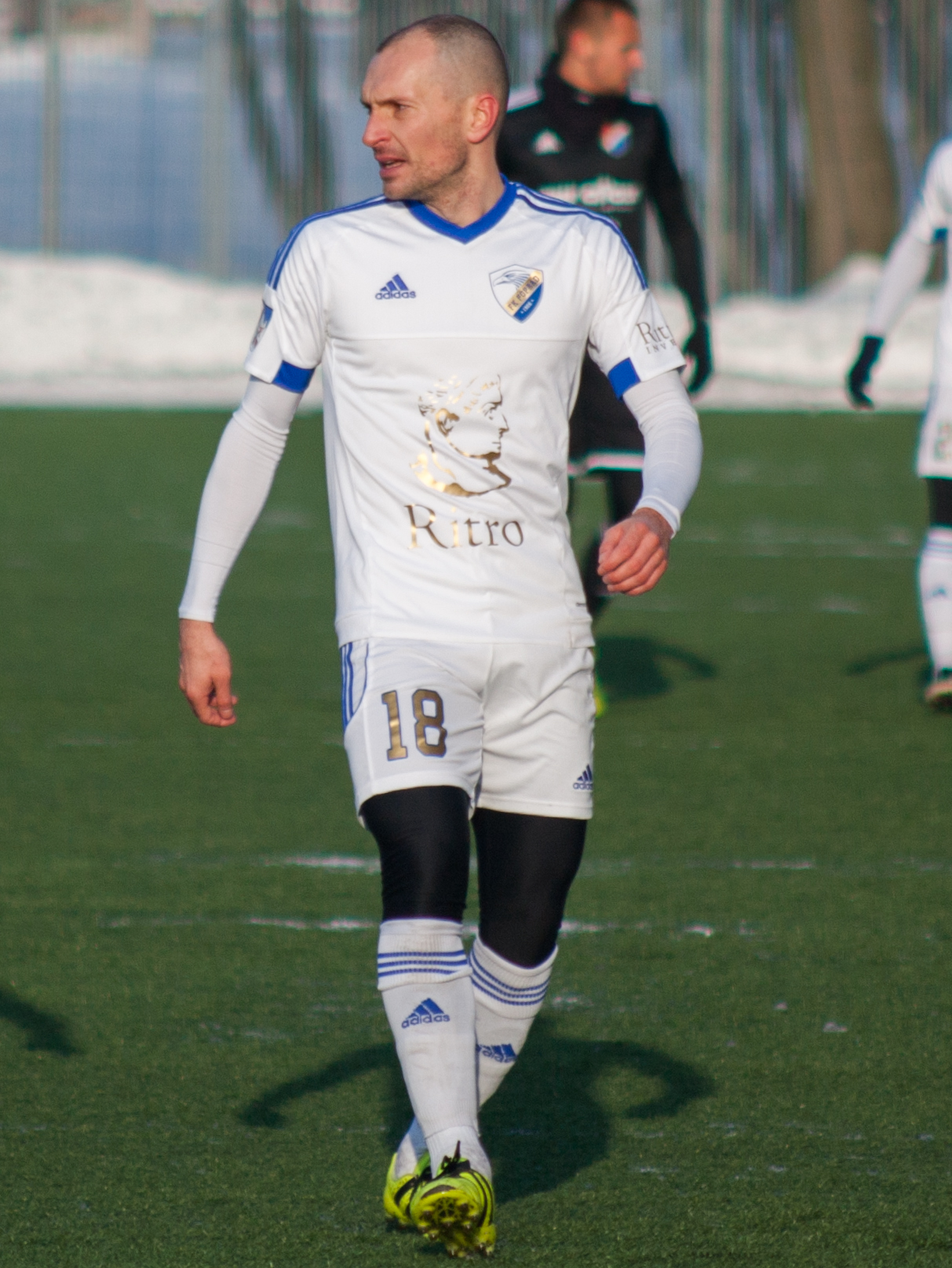
- Štefan Zošák with FK Poprad (2019)

Personal information
- Full name: Štefan Zošák
- Date of birth: 3 April 1984 (age 42)
- Place of birth: Prešov, Czechoslovakia
- Height: 1.74 m (5 ft 9 in)
- Position: Midfielder

Youth career
- 1995–1996: Hanušovce nad Topľou
- 1996–1998: Vranov nad Topľou
- 1998–2001: Košice

Senior career*
Years	Team	Apps	(Gls)
2001–2002	Košice	1	(0)
2002–2010	Ružomberok	209	(23)
2010–2013	Žilina	25	(3)
2012	→ Tatran Prešov (loan)	18	(0)
2013	→ Nitra (loan)	10	(1)
2013–2016	Ružomberok	64	(4)
2016–2017	Shakhter Karagandy	43	(3)
2018–2020	Poprad	56	(5)
2020-	OŠK Bešeňová	70	(40)

International career^{‡}
- Slovakia U19
- Slovakia U20
- Slovakia U21
- * Club domestic league appearances and goals as of 8 January 2020 ‡ National team caps and goals as of 25 January 2012

Štefan Zošák (born 3 April 1984) is a former Slovak professional football midfielder who had most recently played for Poprad.

== Club career ==
=== Early career ===
Zošák was born in Prešov. He started his career at FK Hanušovce nad Topľou, Bukóza Vranov nad Topľou and was later transferred to 1. FC Košice where he spent three seasons. He was signed by Ružomberok in the summer of 2002 at the age of 18. In the 2005–06 season he won the title with MFK Ružomberok in Corgoň Liga and the Slovak Cup. He also captained the team. In June 2010, he joined Slovak club Žilina. He played 22 matches in his first season. He qualified with Žilina for the 2010–11 UEFA Champions League and played two group games. In the next season he made four appearances for Žilina. In January 2012 Zošák joined Slovak club Tatran Prešov on a six-month loan. He made his debut for 1. FC Tatran Prešov against Košice on 3 March 2012. He then continued his career with Nitra before returning to Ružomberok in summer 2013.

== International career ==
Zošák participated at the 2003 FIFA World Youth Championship for Slovakia and played a match against Brazil in the round of 16.

== Honours ==
=== Ružomberok ===
- Corgoň Liga (1): 2005–06
- Slovak Cup (1): 2005–06

=== International ===
- UEFA European Under-19 Football Championship: 3rd place (2002)
