= Tomáš Oravec =

Slovak footballer

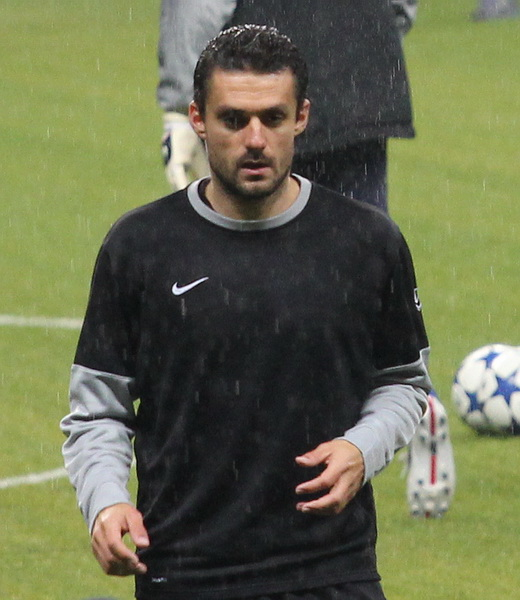

Personal information
- Full name: Tomáš Oravec
- Date of birth: 3 July 1980 (age 46)
- Place of birth: Košice, Czechoslovakia
- Height: 1.86 m (6 ft 1 in)
- Position: Forward

Youth career
- Spoje Košice
- Košice

Senior career*
Years	Team	Apps	(Gls)
1998–2000	Košice	31	(4)
2000–2002	Ružomberok	39	(20)
2002–2004	Viktoria Žižkov	53	(16)
2004–2005	Admira Wacker	28	(8)
2005	Panionios	13	(2)
2006	Boavista	12	(0)
2006–2008	Artmedia Bratislava	66	(28)
2009–2010	Žilina	44	(24)
2011	Shaanxi Renhe	11	(3)
2011	Spartak Trnava	14	(3)
2012	Astra Ploieşti	0	(0)
2012–2013	Enosis	19	(1)
2013–	SC Marchtrenk		

International career^{‡}
	Slovakia U18	3	(1)
	Slovakia U21	5	(2)
2001–2010	Slovakia	9	(3)

Managerial career
- 2025-: Slovan B (Assistant)
- * Club domestic league appearances and goals as of 4 November 2014 ‡ National team caps and goals as of 4 November 2014

Tomáš Oravec (Slovak pronunciation: [ˈtɔmaːʂ ˈɔraʋets]; born 3 July 1980) is a Slovak former football forward who last played for SC Marchtrenk in the Austrian Landesliga.

Oravec became the Corgoň Liga top-scorer in 2006–07 whilst at Artmedia Bratislava.

On 15 September 2010, Oravec scored the first ever Champions League goal for MŠK Žilina in their 1-4 home loss against Chelsea.

Oravec scored two goals on his Slovakia debut on 15 August 2001 in a friendly against Iran.

== International goals ==
Scores and results list Slovakia's goal tally first.

#	Date	Venue	Opponent	Score	Result	Competition
1	15 August 2001	Tehelné pole, Bratislava, Slovakia	Iran	1–2	3–4	Friendly match
2	15 August 2001	Tehelné pole, Bratislava, Slovakia	Iran	2–2	3–4	Friendly match
3	7 October 2001	Philip II Arena, Skopje, Macedonia	North Macedonia	5–0	5–0	2002 FIFA World Cup qualification
