= Juraj Halenár =

Slovak footballer (1983–2018)

Personal information
- Full name: Juraj Halenár
- Date of birth: 28 June 1983
- Place of birth: Trnava, Czechoslovakia
- Date of death: 30 June 2018 (aged 35)
- Place of death: Bratislava, Slovakia
- Height: 1.87 m (6 ft 2 in)
- Position: Forward

Youth career
- Lokomotíva Trnava
- Inter Bratislava

Senior career*
Years	Team	Apps	(Gls)
2001–2005	Inter Bratislava	105	(35)
2005–2008	Artmedia Petržalka	86	(33)
2008–2014	Slovan Bratislava	150	(55)
2015	Nyíregyháza Spartacus	13	(1)
2015	Sigma Olomouc	10	(1)
2016	Iskra Borčice	5	(0)
2016	Petržalka akadémia	11	(5)
2017–2018	SV Gaflenz	0	(0)
Total		380	(181)

International career
2007–2008	Slovakia	3	(0)
- * Club domestic league appearances and goals as of 7 March 2017

Juraj Halenár (28 June 1983 – 30 June 2018) was a Slovak football forward who was most famous for playing for Slovan Bratislava.

== Club career ==
Halenár, a native of Trnava, moved to Bratislava at the age of 18, when he joined Slovakia's reigning champions, Inter Bratislava. He impressed in the 2004-05 campaign, in which he scored 12 goals for the club in the Corgoň Liga. Following the first game of the new season, in which he bagged two goals against Ružomberok, Halenár transferred to Artmedia for an undisclosed fee, reported to be in the region of 20 million Slovak crowns. In only his second game for Artmedia on 27 July 2005, he scored a hat-trick against Celtic Glasgow in the 2005 UEFA Champions League second qualifying round tie.

In summer 2008, Halenár was sold to Slovan Bratislava. The striker scored two goals on his debut for Slovan in a 4–1 victory against Tatran Prešov. He became the top all time scorer in the Slovak top flight on 10 August 2014, when he scored a brace against Košice, surpassing Róbert Semeník's record of 120 goals. In January 2015, Halenár left the Slovak league and signed for Hungarian team Nyíregyháza Spartacus, where he stayed until the end of the season. Afterwards, he joined Sigma Olomouc on 9 July 2015. In December 2015, he left the club due to family reasons.

== International career ==
Halenár played at two youth tournaments for his country, the UEFA European Under-19 Championship in 2002 and the Under-20 FIFA World Youth Championship in 2003. On 13 November 2007, he made his debut for Slovakia's senior team in a qualifying game for the 2008 European Championship against the Czech Republic. Halenár also played in next two matches of the national team, when he came on as a substitute against San Marino and Hungary.

== Death ==
On 30 June 2018, just two days after his 35th birthday, Halenár was found dead in the woods of Vrakuňa outside the Slovak capital of Bratislava. The first reports state that he committed suicide.

== Honours ==
=== Slovakia ===
Slovakia U20

- 2003 FIFA U-20 World Cup: Participation

Slovakia U19

- 2002 UEFA European Under-19 Football Championship - Third place
