= Radek Dosoudil =

Czech footballer (born 1983)

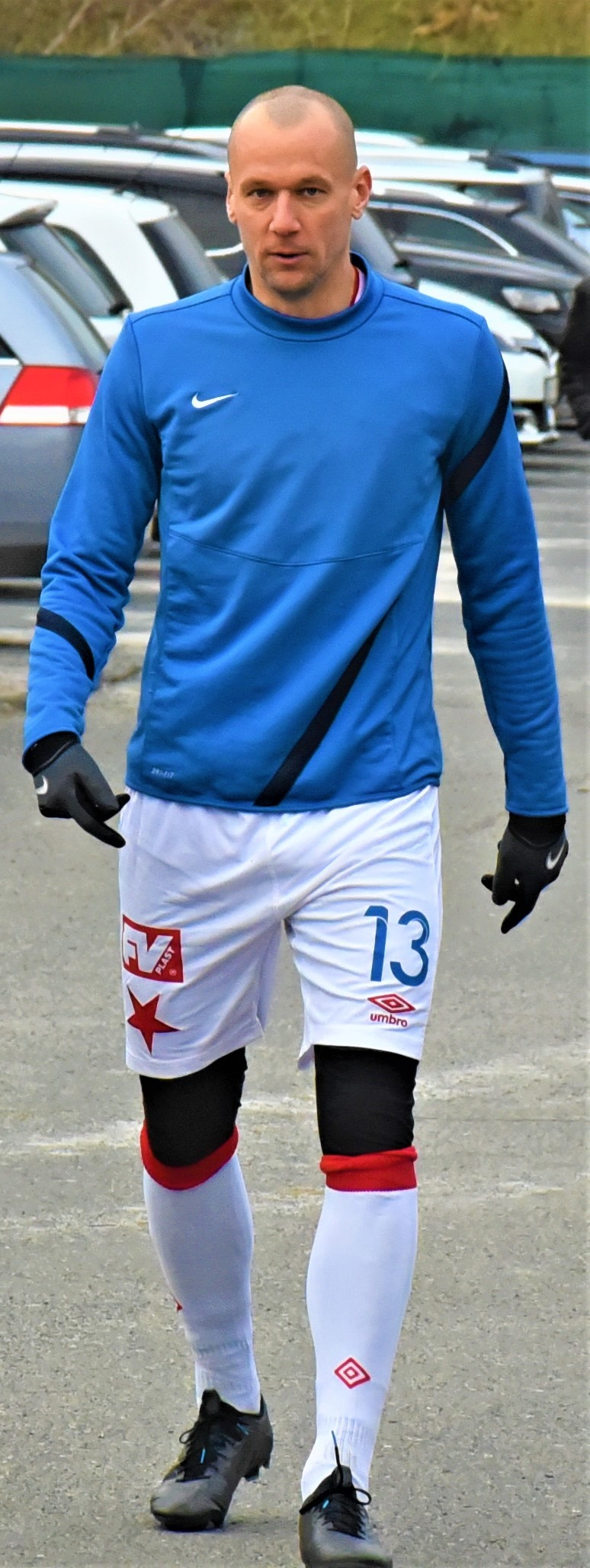

Personal information
- Date of birth: 20 June 1983 (age 43)
- Place of birth: Mladá Boleslav, Czechoslovakia
- Height: 1.90 m (6 ft 3 in)
- Position: Centre back

Youth career
- 1988–1998: Mladá Boleslav
- 1998–2000: Sparta Prague

Senior career*
Years	Team	Apps	(Gls)
2000–2004	Sparta Prague B	33	(0)
2001	→ Mladá Boleslav (loan)		
2002	→ Kolín (loan)	13	(0)
2004–2005	→ Baumit Jablonec 97 (loan)	28	(0)
2005	Denizlispor	7	(0)
2006–2007	Slavia Prague	25	(0)
2007–2008	Artmedia Petržalka	40	(0)
2009–2012	Slovan Bratislava	64	(1)
2012–2014	Mladá Boleslav	29	(0)
2014	Dinamo Tbilisi		

International career
2000–2001	Czech Republic U17	11	(0)
2002	Czech Republic U19	8	(1)
2004	Czech Republic U21	3	(0)
- * Club domestic league appearances and goals as of 26 June 2014

Radek Dosoudil (born 20 June 1983) is a Czech footballer, who plays as a centre back. He last played for Dinamo Tbilisi.

== Club career ==
He began his football career as a junior in 1998 with FK Mladá Boleslav, where his talent earned him a move to the famous Sparta Prague in 1998. He had a short spell in Turkey, where he played for Denizlispor in 2005. In summer 2007 he joined the slovak club Artmedia Petržalka, with which he won the double and played in the qualification round for the Champions League, where Artmedia lost to Juventus. In January 2009 he was transferred to local rivals Slovan Bratislava.

He previously played for FK Jablonec and Slavia Prague.

In 2013, Dosoudil suffered a broken leg following a challenge from Sparta Prague striker Léonard Kweuke in a Czech Cup match. Kweuke was banned for a league-record 12 matches for the incident.

== International career ==
Dosoudil represented the Czech Republic at U21 level. He also played for the Czech Republic at the U-20 World Cup in 2003.
