= 2009–10 Slovak Superliga =

Corgoň Liga
- Season: 2009–10
- Dates: 10 July 2009 – 15 May 2010
- Champions: Žilina
- Relegated: Petržalka
- Champions League: Žilina
- Europa League: Slovan Bratislava; Dukla Banská Bystrica; Nitra
- Matches: 156
- Goals: 362 (2.32 per match)
- Biggest home win: Petržalka 7–0 Dubnica
- Biggest away win: Košice 0–5 B.Bystrica
- Highest scoring: Trnava 5–4 Košice
- Highest attendance: 10,875
- Average attendance: ▼2,417

The 2009–10 Slovak Superliga season of the Slovak Superliga, also known as Corgoň Liga due to sponsorship reasons, was the 17th edition of the league since its establishment. It began on 10 July 2009 and ended on 15 May 2010.

Slovan Bratislava were the 2008–09 defending champions.

== Team changes from 2008–09 ==
ViOn Zlaté Moravce were relegated after finishing the 2008–09 season in 12th and last place. They were replaced by 2008–09 1. Liga champions Inter Bratislava.

While the First League promotees will carry the name of the former Slovak champions, the team will actually play its home matches in Senica after a merger with fourth-division side FK Senica. An intended name change for the 2009–10 season was filed too late to be accepted, so the team will be renamed at the beginning of the following season.

In another name change, FC Artmedia Petržalka were renamed MFK Petržalka effective 1 July 2009.

== Stadiums and locations ==
Location of teams in 2009–10 Slovak Superliga

Team	Location	Stadium	Capacity
DAC 1904	Dunajská Streda	Mestský štadión - DAC Dunajská Streda	16,410
MFK Dubnica	Dubnica	Mestský štadión	5,450
Dukla	Banská Bystrica	SNP Stadium	10,000
FK Senica	Senica	Štadión FK Senica	4,600
MFK Košice	Košice	Štadión Lokomotívy v Čermeli	9,600
FC Nitra	Nitra	Štadión pod Zoborom	11,384
MFK Petržalka	Petržalka, Bratislava	Štadión Petržalka	9,500
MFK Ružomberok	Ružomberok	Štadión MFK Ružomberok	4,817
Slovan	Bratislava	Tehelné pole	30,085
Spartak	Trnava	Štadión Antona Malatinského	18,448
Tatran	Prešov	Tatran Štadión	14,000
MŠK Žilina	Žilina	Stadium pod Dubňom	13,000

== League table ==
Pos	Team	Pld	W	D	L	GF	GA	GD	Pts	Qualification or relegation
1	Žilina (C)	33	23	4	6	59	17	+42	73	Qualification for Champions League second qualifying round
2	Slovan Bratislava	33	21	7	5	54	24	+30	70	Qualification for Europa League third qualifying round (Note: Slovan Bratislava won the 2009–10 Slovak Cup and qualified for the third qualifying round of the UEFA Europa League.)
3	Dukla Banská Bystrica	33	15	11	7	45	30	+15	56	Qualification for Europa League second qualifying round
4	Nitra	33	14	6	13	42	40	+2	48	Qualification for Europa League first qualifying round
5	Ružomberok	33	13	8	12	33	35	−2	47	
6	Senica	33	12	7	14	34	44	−10	43	
7	Spartak Trnava	33	12	5	16	52	46	+6	41	
8	Tatran Prešov	33	11	5	17	32	38	−6	38	
9	Dubnica	33	8	12	13	27	42	−15	36	
10	DAC Dunajská Streda	33	7	12	14	28	47	−19	33	
11	Košice	33	8	9	16	32	57	−25	33	
12	Petržalka (R)	33	7	8	18	33	51	−18	29	Relegation to 1. Liga

Source: Kicker (in German)
Rules for classification: 1) points; 2) goal difference; 3) number of goals scored.
(C) Champions; (R) Relegated

== Results ==
The schedule consists of three rounds. The two first rounds consist of a conventional home and away round-robin schedule. The pairings of the third round were set according to the 2008–09 final standings. Every team played each opponent once for a total of 11 games per team.

=== First and second round ===
Home \ Away	DAC	BB	NIT	SEN	DUB	KOŠ	PET	RUŽ	ŽIL	SLO	TRN	PRE
DAC Dunajská Streda		0–2	2–2	1–2	1–1	1–1	3–2	1–1	0–2	0–0	2–1	3–0
Dukla Banská Bystrica	2–0		0–3	1–0	3–0	0–0	3–0	1–1	1–0	2–1	1–0	2–1
Nitra	2–0	0–0		2–1	0–1	4–0	1–3	2–0	0–1	0–1	1–0	1–0
Senica	0–1	2–2	0–0		2–1	2–2	2–0	2–1	0–1	0–2	0–0	3–2
Dubnica	1–3	1–2	3–0	0–1		1–0	0–0	1–2	0–1	0–1	2–1	1–0
Košice	2–0	0–5	0–1	0–1	1–1		1–0	3–1	0–2	1–2	1–4	0–1
Petržalka	1–0	1–1	0–0	1–2	7–0	3–0		2–2	1–0	0–2	2–1	0–1
Ružomberok	0–0	1–1	1–0	0–1	1–1	2–0	2–0		0–3	1–3	2–1	2–0
Žilina	1–0	3–1	1–1	3–0	4–0	4–1	2–0	1–0		2–0	2–1	1–0
Slovan Bratislava	2–0	3–0	2–1	3–0	1–1	3–0	1–1	0–2	2–1		1–1	3–1
Spartak Trnava	7–0	0–0	1–2	3–0	1–0	5–4	2–0	3–1	1–1	0–2		2–0
Prešov	0–0	0–1	3–1	0–0	0–0	1–1	2–0	1–0	1–0	3–0	1–2	

Source: Kicker (in German)
Legend: Blue = home team win; Yellow = draw; Red = away team win.

=== Third round ===
Key numbers for pairing determination (number marks position in final standings 2008–09):

23rd round	24th round	25th round	26th round	27th round	28th round
1 - 12	1 - 2	2 - 12	1 - 4	3 - 12	1 - 6
2 - 11	8 - 6	3 - 1	2 - 3	4 - 2	2 - 5
3 - 10	9 - 5	4 - 11	9 - 7	5 - 1	3 - 4
4 - 9	10 - 4	5 - 10	10 - 6	6 - 11	10 - 8
5 - 8	11 - 3	6 - 9	11 - 5	7 - 10	11 - 7
6 - 7	12 - 7	7 - 8	12 - 8	8 - 9	12 - 9

29th round	30th round	31st round	32nd round	33rd round
4 - 12	1 - 8	5 - 12	1 - 10	6 - 12
5 - 3	2 - 7	6 - 4	2 - 9	7 - 5
6 - 2	3 - 6	7 - 3	3 - 8	8 - 4
7 - 1	4 - 5	8 - 2	4 - 7	9 - 3
8 - 11	11 - 9	9 - 1	5 - 6	10 - 2
9 - 10	12 - 10	10 - 11	12 - 11	11 - 1

Home \ Away	DAC	BB	NIT	SEN	DUB	KOŠ	PET	RUŽ	ŽIL	SLO	TRN	PRE
DAC Dunajská Streda		1–1						0–0		0–1	2–1	2–1
Dukla Banská Bystrica			3–1		1–1	2–2	4–0		1–1			
Nitra	1–0							3–1		2–5	2–2	4–2
Senica	2–2	2–1	1–2		1–1							1–2
Dubnica	1–1		1–0			1–1	2–0		1–1			
Košice	2–1		2–0	2–0				2–0	0–4			3–1
Petržalka	1–1		3–2	1–2		0–0			0–4			2–3
Ružomberok		1–0		2–1	1–0		1–0			2–0	2–1	
Žilina	4–0		0–1	2–1				1–0			5–1	1–0
Slovan Bratislava		2–0		2–0	2–2	0–0	1–1		2–0			
Spartak Trnava		2–0		1–2	0–1	4–0	3–1			0–3		
Prešov		0–1			2–0			0–0		0–1	3–0	

Source: Kicker (in German)
Legend: Blue = home team win; Yellow = draw; Red = away team win.

== Top goalscorers ==
Updated through games played on 15 May 2010; Source:

Rank	Player	Club	Goals
1	(Slovakia) Róbert Rák	FC Nitra	18
2	(Slovakia) Ivan Lietava	MŠK Žilina	13
3	(Slovakia) Ján Novák	MFK Košice	11
4	(Slovakia) Juraj Halenár	Slovan Bratislava	11
4	(Ukraine) Oleksandr Pyschur	MFK Ružomberok	11
4	(Slovakia) Tomáš Oravec	MŠK Žilina	11
7	(Slovakia) Pavol Masaryk	Slovan Bratislava	10
8	(Slovakia) Peter Doležaj	Spartak Trnava	9
9	(Slovakia) Tomáš Majtán	MFK Petržalka/MŠK Žilina	8
9	(Slovakia) Ľubomír Bernáth	Spartak Trnava	8

== Attendances ==
#	Club	Average
1	Trnava	4,403
2	Žilina	3,730
3	Slovan	3,213
4	DAC	3,209
5	Ružomberok	2,476
6	Senica	2,321
7	Dukla	2,204
8	Nitra	2,151
9	Prešov	2,088
10	Dubnica	1,489
11	Košice	1,077
12	Petržalka	578

== See also ==
- 2009–10 Slovak Cup
- 2009–10 Slovak First League
