= Slovak Super Cup =

Slovenský Superpohár
- Organiser(s): Slovak Football Association (SFA)
- Founded: 1994; 32 years ago
- Abolished: 2014; 12 years ago
- Region: Slovakia
- Teams: 2
- Related competitions: Slovak First Football League (qualifier); Slovak Cup (qualifier)
- Last champions: Slovan Bratislava (4th title)
- Most championships: Slovan Bratislava and Žilina (4 titles)

The Slovak Super Cup (Slovenský Superpohár in Slovak), in the past named as Matičný pohár or Pribinov pohár, was a match between the champion of the Slovak First Football League and winner of the Slovak Cup. The match was played annually besides years when a club clinched the double.

The first match in 1993 was played between Slovan Bratislava and the Slovakia national football team. The 2014 edition of the cup, which ended up being the last, was attended by just 550 people. The Slovak Supercup was discontinued in 2016 and replaced by the Czech-Slovak Supercup from 2017 onward.

== Winners ==
Year	Venue	Fortuna Liga Winner	Score	Slovnaft Cup Winner
1993 (unofficial)	Štadión pod Zoborom, Nitra	Slovan Bratislava	3 – 3 (3–2 pen.)	Slovakia national football team
1994	Humenné	Slovan Bratislava	2 – 0	Tatran Prešov (Runner-up)
1995	Štadión MFK Ružomberok, Ružomberok	Slovan Bratislava	2 – 3	Inter Bratislava
1996	Štadión pod Zoborom, Nitra	Slovan Bratislava	3 – 1	Chemlon Humenné
1997	Štadión pod Zoborom, Nitra	1. FC Košice	5 – 0	Slovan Bratislava
1998	Štadión pod Zoborom, Nitra	1. FC Košice	1 – 3	Spartak Trnava
1999	–	Slovan Bratislava	not held	Slovan Bratislava
2000	–	Inter Bratislava	not held	Inter Bratislava
2001	–	Inter Bratislava	not held	Inter Bratislava
2002	Štadión FC ViOn, Zlaté Moravce	MŠK Žilina	1 – 1 (3–4 pen.)	VTJ Koba Senec
2003	Štadión FC ViOn, Zlaté Moravce	MŠK Žilina	2 – 0	Matador Púchov
2004	NTC Stadion, Senec	MŠK Žilina	2 – 1	Artmedia Petržalka
2005	NTC Stadion, Senec	Artmedia Petržalka	3 – 1	Dukla Banská Bystrica
2006	–	MFK Ružomberok	not held	MFK Ružomberok
2007	NTC Stadion, Senec	MŠK Žilina	1 – 1 (5–4 pen.)	ViOn Zlaté Moravce
2008	–	Artmedia Petržalka	not held	Artmedia Petržalka
2009	Dolný Kubín	Slovan Bratislava	2 – 0	MFK Košice
2010	Pasienky, Bratislava	MŠK Žilina	1 – 1 (4–2 pen.)	Slovan Bratislava
2011	–	Slovan Bratislava	not held	Slovan Bratislava
2012	–	MŠK Žilina	not held	MŠK Žilina
2013	–	Slovan Bratislava	not held	Slovan Bratislava
2014	Pasienky, Bratislava	Slovan Bratislava	1–0	MFK Košice
2015	–	AS Trenčín	not held	AS Trenčín
2016	–	AS Trenčín	not held	AS Trenčín

== Performance by club ==
Club	Winners	Runners-up	Winning years
Slovan Bratislava	4	3	1994, 1996, 2009, 2014
Žilina	4	1	2003, 2004, 2007, 2010
MFK Košice	1	3	1997
Artmedia Petržalka	1	1	2005
Inter Bratislava	1	–	1995
Spartak Trnava	1	–	1998
Senec	1	–	2002
Tatran Prešov	–	1	–
Chemlon Humenné	–	1	–
Matador Púchov	–	1	–
Dukla Banská Bystrica	–	1	–
ViOn Zlaté Moravce	–	1	–

== See also ==
- Czech Supercup
