= List of Slovak football transfers summer 2015 =

Notable Slovak football transfers in the summer transfer window 2015 by club. Only transfers of the Fortuna Liga and DOXXbet liga are included.

== Fortuna Liga ==
=== FK AS Trenčín ===
In: Note: Flags indicate national team as defined under FIFA eligibility rules; some limited exceptions apply. Players may hold more than one non-FIFA nationality.

No.	Pos.	Nation	Player
—	FW	BRA	Wesley (from (Brazil) Itabuna Esporte Clube)
—	FW	NGR	Aliko Bala (from (Nigeria) GBS Football Academy)
—	MF	SVK	Matúš Opatovský (loan return from FK Slovan Nemšová)
—	MF	NED	Mitchell Schet (from Free agent)
—	FW	NGR	Godwin Obaje (from (Nigeria) GBS Football Academy)
—	MF	CHN	Yin Congyao (from (China) Nanjing Qianbao F.C.)

Out: Note: Flags indicate national team as defined under FIFA eligibility rules; some limited exceptions apply. Players may hold more than one non-FIFA nationality.

No.	Pos.	Nation	Player
—	MF	SVK	Karol Mondek (to (Czech Republic) FC Baník Ostrava)
—	MF	SVK	Damián Bariš (on loan to MFK Skalica)
—	MF	SVK	Peter Mazan (on loan to MFK Skalica)
—	FW	NGR	Emmanuel Edmond (to TBA)
—	DF	SVK	Daniel Bednárik (to TBA)
—	FW	SVK	Martin Vlček (on loan to FK Slovan Nemšová)
—	DF	BRA	Ramón (to (Denmark) FC Nordsjælland)
—	FW	BRA	Jairo (to (Greece) PAOK FC)
—	FW	SVK	Tomáš Malec (on loan to (Czech Republic) SK Sigma Olomouc)
—	MF	SVK	Stanislav Lobotka (to (Denmark) FC Nordsjælland)
17	DF	SVK	Peter Čögley (Released and joined (Czech Republic) Bohemians 1905)

=== MŠK Žilina ===
In: Note: Flags indicate national team as defined under FIFA eligibility rules; some limited exceptions apply. Players may hold more than one non-FIFA nationality.

No.	Pos.	Nation	Player
—	GK	CZE	Aleš Mandous (from (Czech Republic) FC Viktoria Plzeň)
—	DF	SVK	Róbert Mazáň (on loan from (Poland) Podbeskidzie)
—	FW	BIH	Nermin Haskić (from FC VSS Košice)
—	MF	SVK	Filip Hlohovský (from FK Senica)

Out: Note: Flags indicate national team as defined under FIFA eligibility rules; some limited exceptions apply. Players may hold more than one non-FIFA nationality.

No.	Pos.	Nation	Player
—	MF	SVK	Adam Žilák (to FO ŽP Šport Podbrezová)
—	FW	CRO	Matej Jelić (to (Austria) SK Rapid Wien)
—	MF	SVK	Peter Lupčo (on loan to (Czech Republic) MFK Karviná)
—	MF	SVK	Michal Klec (on loan to FK Senica)

=== ŠK Slovan Bratislava ===
In: Note: Flags indicate national team as defined under FIFA eligibility rules; some limited exceptions apply. Players may hold more than one non-FIFA nationality.

No.	Pos.	Nation	Player
—	DF	SRB	Boris Sekulić (from Free agent)
—	DF	CZE	Jakub Podaný (from (Czech Republic) AC Sparta Prague)
—	FW	HUN	Tamás Priskin (from (Hungary) Győri ETO FC)
—	GK	SVK	Martin Polaček (loan return from FC DAC 1904 Dunajská Streda)
—	GK	SVK	Ján Mucha (from (Russia) FC Krylia Sovetov Samara)
—	MF	ARG	Mauro González (on loan from (Argentina) Boca Juniors)
—	MF	MNE	Vukan Savićević (from (Serbia) Red Star Belgrade)

Out: Note: Flags indicate national team as defined under FIFA eligibility rules; some limited exceptions apply. Players may hold more than one non-FIFA nationality.

No.	Pos.	Nation	Player
—	DF	SVK	Branislav Niňaj (to (Belgium) K.S.C. Lokeren)
—	GK	SVK	Dušan Perniš (Released and joined (Greece) Iraklis)
—	GK	SVK	Martin Polaček (to (Poland) Zagłębie Lubin)
—	MF	SVK	Adrián Čermák (on loan to MFK Skalica)
—	DF	SVK	Martin Vrablec (to MFK Skalica)
—	MF	GUI	Seydouba Soumah (on loan to (Kuwait) Qadsia SC)
—	MF	SVK	Richard Lásik (on loan to (Czech Republic) FC Baník Ostrava)
—	DF	SVK	Michal Sipľak (loan return to Partizán Bardejov)
—	MF	SVK	Viktor Miklós (on loan to MFK Ružomberok)
—	DF	SVK	Martin Dobrotka (end by own request)

=== FC Spartak Trnava ===
In: Note: Flags indicate national team as defined under FIFA eligibility rules; some limited exceptions apply. Players may hold more than one non-FIFA nationality.

No.	Pos.	Nation	Player
—	DF	SVK	Boris Godál (from (Poland) Zagłębie Lubin)
—	MF	BIH	Emir Halilović (from (Czech Republic) FC Hradec Králové)
—	MF	SVK	Tomáš Mikinič (loan return from FC ViOn Zlaté Moravce)
—	FW	SVK	Ivan Schranz (loan return from (Czech Republic) AC Sparta Prague)
—	FW	BIH	Haris Harba (on loan from (Czech Republic) FC Vysočina Jihlava)
—	MF	ARG	Aldo Baéz (on loan from (Czech Republic) Slavia Prague)
—	GK	SVK	Ľuboš Kamenár (from Free agent)
—	FW	SVK	Tomáš Majtán (from Free agent)
—	DF	SVK	Ľuboš Hanzel (from Free agent)
—	FW	ARG	David Depetris (from Free agent)
—	MF	MLI	Niaré Benogo (on loan from (Ghana) International Allies F.C.)

Out: Note: Flags indicate national team as defined under FIFA eligibility rules; some limited exceptions apply. Players may hold more than one non-FIFA nationality.

No.	Pos.	Nation	Player
—	FW	SVK	Peter Sládek (loan return to Spartak Myjava)
—	FW	CZE	Martin Vyskočil (Released)
—	DF	SRB	Srđan Grabež (Released)
—	MF	SVK	Kamil Kuzma (Released and joined FC VSS Košice)
—	GK	CRO	Ivan Kelava (loan return to (Spain) Granada CF)
—	FW	SRB	Stefan Durić (Released)
—	DF	SVK	Patrik Banovič (Released)
—	MF	SVK	Ján Chovanec (Released)
—	MF	SVK	Ján Vlasko (to (Poland) Zagłębie Lubin)
—	MF	SVK	Erik Sabo (to (Greece) PAOK FC)
—	MF	SVK	Tomáš Mikinič (on loan to FO ŽP Šport Podbrezová)

=== FK Senica ===
In: Note: Flags indicate national team as defined under FIFA eligibility rules; some limited exceptions apply. Players may hold more than one non-FIFA nationality.

No.	Pos.	Nation	Player
—	DF	SVK	Zoltán Kontár (on loan from FC Petržalka akadémia)
—	DF	SVK	Ivan Hladík (loan return from MŠK Rimavská Sobota)
—	MF	SVK	Jakub Hromada (on loan from (Italy) Sampdoria)
—	DF	CZE	Tomáš Vengřinek (on loan from (Czech Republic) FC Baník Ostrava)
—	MF	SVK	Michal Klec (on loan from MŠK Žilina)
—	FW	ZIM	Walter Musona (from (Zimbabwe) FC Platinum)
—	MF	ZIM	Wisdom Mutasa (from (Zimbabwe) FC Platinum)
—	FW	SVK	Pavol Cicman (from (Czech Republic) Bohemians 1905)
—	GK	SVK	Patrik Lukáč (from (Czech Republic) FK Teplice)

Out: Note: Flags indicate national team as defined under FIFA eligibility rules; some limited exceptions apply. Players may hold more than one non-FIFA nationality.

No.	Pos.	Nation	Player
—	MF	SVK	Tomáš Kóňa (Released and joined Spartak Myjava)
—	FW	SVK	Tomáš Majtán (Released and joined Spartak Trnava)
—	MF	SVK	Lukáš Opiela (Released and joined (Italy) Siena)
—	DF	CZE	Pavel Čermák (Released)
—	DF	SVK	Július Gombala (Released)
—	DF	SVK	Zdenko Filípek (on loan to FC Rohožník)
—	DF	SVK	Juraj Chvátal (to (Czech Republic) AC Sparta Prague)
—	MF	SVK	Filip Hlohovský (to MŠK Žilina)

=== MFK Ružomberok ===
In: Note: Flags indicate national team as defined under FIFA eligibility rules; some limited exceptions apply. Players may hold more than one non-FIFA nationality.

No.	Pos.	Nation	Player
—	FW	SVK	Martin Jakubko (from (Russia) FC Amkar Perm)
—	DF	SVK	Peter Maslo (from (Poland) LKS Nieciecza)
—	MF	SVK	Tomáš Ďubek (from (Czech Republic) FC Slovan Liberec)
—	MF	SVK	Michal Faško (from Free agent)
—	GK	SVK	Matúš Macík (from MFK Tatran Liptovský Mikuláš)
—	MF	MDA	Anatol Cheptine (from (Moldova) FC Zimbru Chișinău)
—	GK	MKD	Darko Tofiloski (from Free agent)
—	MF	SVK	Viktor Miklós (on loan from ŠK Slovan Bratislava)
—	MF	SVK	Marek Sapara (from Free Agent)
—	FW	SVK	Miloš Lačný (from Free Agent)

Out: Note: Flags indicate national team as defined under FIFA eligibility rules; some limited exceptions apply. Players may hold more than one non-FIFA nationality.

No.	Pos.	Nation	Player
—	MF	SVK	Lukáš Janič (loan return to MFK Zemplín Michalovce)
—	GK	SRB	Milorad Nikolić (Released)
—	MF	SVK	Erik Liener (Released, previously on loan at MFK Lokomotíva Zvolen)
—	MF	SVK	Richard Bartoš (Released, previously on loan at MFK Dolný Kubín)
—	MF	SVK	Miroslav Almaský (Released, previously on loan at ŠKM Liptovský Hrádok)
—	DF	SVK	Oliver Práznovský (Released)
—	MF	SVK	Mário Almaský (on loan to FO ŽP Šport Podbrezová)
—	FW	SVK	Štefan Gerec (on loan to MFK Tatran Liptovský Mikuláš)
—	GK	SVK	Tomáš Lešňovský (to MFK Dolný Kubín)
—	FW	SVK	Boris Turčák (to ŠKF Sereď)

=== FC DAC 1904 Dunajská Streda ===
In: Note: Flags indicate national team as defined under FIFA eligibility rules; some limited exceptions apply. Players may hold more than one non-FIFA nationality.

No.	Pos.	Nation	Player
—	FW	SVK	Róbert Polievka (from FK Dukla Banská Bystrica)
—	FW	SVK	Erik Pačinda (from FC VSS Košice)
—	GK	SVK	Tomáš Tujvel (on loan from (Hungary) Videoton FC)
—	FW	PAN	Alfredo Stephens (on loan from (Panama) Chorrillo F.C.)
—	MF	FRA	Yves Pambou (from (France) Trélissac FC)
—	GK	SVK	Matej Slávik (on loan from MFK Dubnica)
—	DF	CRO	Antonio Asanović (from ŠK Senec)
—	DF	PAN	Erick Davis (from (Uruguay) Centro Atlético Fénix)

Out: Note: Flags indicate national team as defined under FIFA eligibility rules; some limited exceptions apply. Players may hold more than one non-FIFA nationality.

No.	Pos.	Nation	Player
—	DF	SVK	Peter Majerník (Released and joined FK Inter Bratislava)
—	DF	SVK	Ivan Šnirc (Released)
—	GK	SVK	Martin Polaček (loan return to ŠK Slovan Bratislava)
—	FW	SVK	Roman Sabler (on loan to FO ŽP Šport Podbrezová)
—	MF	SVK	Erik Ujlaky (to (Czech Republic) MFK Frýdek-Místek)
—	DF	SVK	Mário Tóth (on loan to (Czech Republic) MFK Karviná)
—	DF	BIH	Ivan Sesar (on loan to (Bosnia and Herzegovina) NK Široki Brijeg)
—	GK	SVK	Andrej Pernecký (on loan to FC VSS Košice)
26	DF	SVK	Otto Szabó (Retired)

=== Spartak Myjava ===
In: Note: Flags indicate national team as defined under FIFA eligibility rules; some limited exceptions apply. Players may hold more than one non-FIFA nationality.

No.	Pos.	Nation	Player
29	FW	SVK	Peter Sládek (loan return from Spartak Trnava)
11	MF	SVK	Ján Chovanec (from Spartak Trnava)
6	MF	SVK	Tomáš Kóňa (from Free agent)
33	FW	SVK	Juraj Piroska (from Free agent)
24	DF	SVK	Patrik Banovič (from FC Spartak Trnava)
27	FW	SVK	Fabián Slančík (on loan from (Czech Republic) FC Zbrojovka Brno)
5	DF	SVK	Karol Karlík (from (Germany) Chemnitzer FC)
16	FW	SVK	Dávid Škutka (from (Czech Republic) SK Slavia Prague)

Out: Note: Flags indicate national team as defined under FIFA eligibility rules; some limited exceptions apply. Players may hold more than one non-FIFA nationality.

No.	Pos.	Nation	Player
—	DF	SVK	Jakub Kastelovič (Released and joined FK Slovan Duslo Šaľa)
—	MF	SVK	Richard Čiernik (Released)
—	MF	SVK	Radoslav Ciprys (Released and joined MFK Skalica)
—	FW	SVK	Michal Peňaška (loan return to ŠK Slovan Bratislava)
—	FW	SVK	Marek Kuzma (Released and joined TJ Iskra Borčice)
—	DF	SVK	Roman Častulín (Released and joined MFK Nová Dubnica)
—	MF	SVK	Dávid Copko (on loan to ŠK LR Crystal Lednické Rovne)
—	MF	SVK	Erik Vávra (on loan to ŠK LR Crystal Lednické Rovne)
—	MF	SVK	Marek Jastráb (on loan to AFC Nové Mesto nad Váhom)
—	DF	SVK	Denis Švec (on loan to FK Slovan Duslo Šaľa)

=== FC ViOn Zlaté Moravce ===
In: Note: Flags indicate national team as defined under FIFA eligibility rules; some limited exceptions apply. Players may hold more than one non-FIFA nationality.

No.	Pos.	Nation	Player
—	DF	BIH	Ivan Mršić (from (Croatia) NK Hrvatski Dragovoljac)
—	MF	CRO	Marin Glavaš (from (Croatia) NK Osijek)
—	MF	CRO	Mario Burić (from (Austria) LASK Linz)
—	MF	CRO	Josip Krznarić (from (Croatia) NK Bistra)
—	FW	CRO	Denis Bochl (from (Croatia) NK Radoboj)
—	MF	CRO	Dejan Školnik (from (Slovenia) NK Aluminij)
—	GK	SLO	Marko Ranilović (from (Croatia) HNK Hajduk Split)
—	DF	SRB	Stefan Milojević (from (Scotland) Greenock Morton F.C.)
—	MF	SVK	Jozef Rejdovian (from FK Dukla Banská Bystrica)
—	DF	SVK	Šimon Kupec (from FK Dukla Banská Bystrica)
—	DF	GAM	Lamin Samateh (from (Croatia) NK Bistra)
—	FW	SVK	Patrik Klačan (from FK Dukla Banská Bystrica youth)
—	MF	CIV	Mouroukou Farras Bamba (from (France) FC Kogenheim)
—	MF	CMR	Léandre Tawamba (from (Libya) Al-Ahly SC)
—	DF	BRA	Marques de Souza (from (Libya) Al-Ahly SC)
—	MF	BIH	Danijel Majkić (from (Libya) Al-Ahly SC)
—	MF	BIH	Marko Perišić (from (Libya) Al-Ahly SC)
—	FW	SLO	Alen Ploj (from (Slovenia) NK Maribor)
—	GK	LAT	Maksims Uvarenko (from (Bulgaria) PFC CSKA Sofia)

Out: Note: Flags indicate national team as defined under FIFA eligibility rules; some limited exceptions apply. Players may hold more than one non-FIFA nationality.

No.	Pos.	Nation	Player
—	MF	SVK	Tomáš Mikinič (loan return to FC Spartak Trnava)
—	MF	SVK	Martin Juhar (Released and joined (Poland) LKS Nieciecza)
—	DF	SVK	Patrik Pavlenda (Released)
—	DF	SVK	Martin Chren (Released)
—	MF	SVK	Márius Charizopulos (Released)
—	MF	LAT	Andrejs Kiriļins (Released)
—	DF	SRB	Filip Ungar (Released)
—	MF	SVK	Patrik Sabo (loan return to ŠK Slovan Bratislava)
—	MF	SVK	Jozef Rejdovian (on loan to FK Dukla Banská Bystrica)

=== FO ŽP Šport Podbrezová ===
In: Note: Flags indicate national team as defined under FIFA eligibility rules; some limited exceptions apply. Players may hold more than one non-FIFA nationality.

No.	Pos.	Nation	Player
—	GK	SVK	Martin Kuciak (from (Czech Republic) FC Hradec Králové)
—	DF	CAN	Milovan Kapor (from PFK Piešťany)
—	MF	SVK	Adam Žilák (from MŠK Žilina)
—	MF	SVK	Mário Almaský (on loan from MFK Ružomberok)
—	FW	SVK	Roman Sabler (on loan from FC DAC 1904 Dunajská Streda)
—	DF	SVK	Patrik Vajda (from FK Dukla Banská Bystrica)
—	GK	SVK	Ján Ďurčo (from FK Dukla Banská Bystrica)
—	FW	BIH	Alen Melunović (from (Czech Republic) FK Teplice)
—	DF	SUI	Stefan Marinković (from FK Dukla Banská Bystrica)
—	MF	BIH	Mirzad Mehanović (from (Czech Republic) FK Mladá Boleslav)
—	DF	CZE	Jiří Pimpara (on loan from FC Slovan Liberec)
—	MF	SVK	Tomáš Mikinič (on loan from FC Spartak Trnava)
—	MF	SVK	Erik Hric (from FK Dukla Banská Bystrica)
—	DF	BRA	Bernardo Frizoni (from (Hungary) Lombard-Pápa TFC)
—	MF	SVK	Miroslav Viazanko (from FC VSS Košice)
—	FW	SVK	Andrej Rendla (from Free agent)

Out: Note: Flags indicate national team as defined under FIFA eligibility rules; some limited exceptions apply. Players may hold more than one non-FIFA nationality.

No.	Pos.	Nation	Player
—	DF	SVK	Vratislav Greško (Retired)
—	GK	SVK	Jozef Hanák (Retired)
—	FW	NGR	Peter Nworah (Released and joined MFK Zemplín Michalovce)
—	GK	SVK	Pavol Penksa (Released and return to FC DAC 1904 Dunajská Streda)
—	FW	CZE	Martin Šlapák (Released)
—	DF	SVK	Ján Nosko (on loan to FK Pohronie)
—	MF	SVK	Juraj Hovančík (Released)
—	FW	SVK	Dávid Škutka (Released and reuturn to (Czech Republic) SK Slavia Prague)
—	DF	SVK	Marek Janečka (on loan to FC Spartak Trnava)
—	DF	SVK	Milan Harvilko (Released)
—	MF	SVK	Michal Pančík (to FK Dukla Banská Bystrica)

=== MFK Zemplín Michalovce ===
In: Note: Flags indicate national team as defined under FIFA eligibility rules; some limited exceptions apply. Players may hold more than one non-FIFA nationality.

No.	Pos.	Nation	Player
—	FW	NGR	Peter Nworah (from Free agent)
—	MF	SVK	Tomáš Sedlák (loan return from FK Poprad)
—	MF	GHA	Emmanuel Mensah (from FK Bodva Moldava nad Bodvou)
—	MF	SVK	Martin Bednár (from MFK Zemplín Michalovce youth)
—	GK	SVK	Marián Kelemen (from Free agent)
—	DF	GEO	Akaki Khubutia (from Free agent)
—	DF	ESP	Eric Barroso (from (Moldova) FC Tiraspol)
—	FW	CRO	Andrej Kerić (from (Luxembourg) F91 Dudelange)

Out: Note: Flags indicate national team as defined under FIFA eligibility rules; some limited exceptions apply. Players may hold more than one non-FIFA nationality.

No.	Pos.	Nation	Player
—	FW	SVK	Tomáš Chovanec (loan return to MFK Dolný Kubín)
—	MF	SVK	Boris Bališ (loan return to FC Spartak Trnava)
—	FW	SVK	Erik Streňo (loan return to Partizán Bardejov)
—	MF	SVK	Lukáš Janič (to (Poland) Podbeskidzie Bielsko-Biała)
—	MF	SVK	Adrián Leško (on loan to FC Lokomotíva Košice)
—	FW	CRO	Andrej Kerić (Released)

=== MFK Skalica ===
In: Note: Flags indicate national team as defined under FIFA eligibility rules; some limited exceptions apply. Players may hold more than one non-FIFA nationality.

No.	Pos.	Nation	Player
—	MF	SVK	Michal Gašparík (from TJ OFC Gabčíkovo)
—	MF	SVK	Adrián Čermák (on loan from ŠK Slovan Bratislava)
—	MF	SVK	Damián Bariš (on loan from FK AS Trenčín)
—	MF	SVK	Peter Mazan (on loan from FK AS Trenčín)
—	MF	SVK	Mário Kurák (on loan from TJ Jednota Málinec)
—	DF	SVK	Martin Vrablec (from ŠK Slovan Bratislava)
—	GK	SVK	Ľuboš Hajdúch (on loan from (Hungary) Puskás Akadémia FC)
—	FW	SVK	Ivan Lietava (on loan from (Czech Republic) Bohemians 1905)
—	MF	SVK	Radoslav Ciprys (from Free agent)
—	DF	CZE	Lukáš Fialka (on loan from (Czech Republic) SK Slavia Prague)
—	MF	SVK	Marek Hlinka (on loan from (Czech Republic) FK Dukla Prague)

Out: Note: Flags indicate national team as defined under FIFA eligibility rules; some limited exceptions apply. Players may hold more than one non-FIFA nationality.

No.	Pos.	Nation	Player
—	FW	SVK	Lukáš Hutta (loan return to ŠK Slovan Bratislava juniori)
—	DF	SVK	Martin Černek (Released)
—	DF	SVK	Michal Hyža (Released)
—	DF	CZE	Josef Hesek (Released)
—	FW	SVK	Lukáš Pavlačka (Released)
—	DF	SVK	Igor Šefčík (to (Czech Republic) FK Hodonín)

== DOXXbet liga ==
=== FK Dukla Banská Bystrica ===
In: Note: Flags indicate national team as defined under FIFA eligibility rules; some limited exceptions apply. Players may hold more than one non-FIFA nationality.

No.	Pos.	Nation	Player
—	MF	BIH	Momir Zečević (from FC ViOn Zlaté Moravce)
—	MF	SVK	Michal Pančík (from FO ŽP Šport Podbrezová)
—	FW	AUT	Haris Garagić (from (Austria) SR Fach-Donaufeld)
—	FW	SVK	Július Gombala (on loan from FK Senica)
—	DF	SRB	Milan Nikolić (from (Montenegro) FK Jedinstvo Bijelo Polje)
—	MF	BIH	Eldar Bašović (from (Bosnia and Herzegovina) FK Željezničar Sarajevo)
—	MF	SVK	Denis Urgela (loan return from FK Pohronie)
—	MF	SVK	Michal Šufliarsky (on loan from MFK Spartak Hriňová)
—	MF	MKD	Tihomir Kostadinov (from (North Macedonia) FK Teteks)
—	MF	SVK	Gabriel Snitka (from FO ŽP Šport Podbrezová)
—	GK	SVK	Andrej Maťašovský (on loan from MFK Dubnica)
—	MF	SVK	Jozef Rejdovian (on loan from FC ViOn Zlaté Moravce)
—	FW	BIH	Belmin Vila (from (Bosnia and Herzegovina) NK Bosna Visoko)
—	MF	MKD	Dejan Peševski (from (Slovenia) FC Koper)
—	FW	CRO	Viktor Lekaj (from (New Zealand) Hawke's Bay United FC)

Out: Note: Flags indicate national team as defined under FIFA eligibility rules; some limited exceptions apply. Players may hold more than one non-FIFA nationality.

No.	Pos.	Nation	Player
—	FW	SVK	Róbert Polievka (to FC DAC 1904 Dunajská Streda)
—	MF	SVK	Michal Faško (Released)
—	DF	CAN	Milovan Kapor (loan return to PFK Piešťany)
—	DF	SVK	Patrik Vajda (to FO ŽP Šport Podbrezová)
—	GK	SVK	Ján Ďurčo (to FO ŽP Šport Podbrezová)
—	MF	SVK	Jozef Rejdovian (to FC ViOn Zlaté Moravce)
—	DF	SVK	Šimon Kupec (to FC ViOn Zlaté Moravce)
—	FW	SVK	Patrik Klačan (to FC ViOn Zlaté Moravce)
—	MF	SVK	Maroš Balko (to MFK Lokomotíva Zvolen)
—	DF	SVK	Miroslav Gálik (on loan to MŠK Rimavská Sobota)
—	DF	ITA	Marco De Vito (to (Italy) U.S. Folgore Caratese A.S.D.)
—	FW	SVK	Marek Šovčík (on loan to MFK Žarnovica)
—	MF	SVK	Erik Hric (to FO ŽP Šport Podbrezová)

=== FC Nitra ===
In: Note: Flags indicate national team as defined under FIFA eligibility rules; some limited exceptions apply. Players may hold more than one non-FIFA nationality.

No.	Pos.	Nation	Player
—	FW	SVK	Adam Morong (on loan from FK AS Trenčín)
—	MF	SVK	Márius Charizopulos (on loan from ČFK Nitra)
—	DF	SVK	Jaroslav Kostelný (from (Austria) SC Ritzing)

Out: Note: Flags indicate national team as defined under FIFA eligibility rules; some limited exceptions apply. Players may hold more than one non-FIFA nationality.

No.	Pos.	Nation	Player
—	MF	SVK	Marek Kostoláni (Released)
—	DF	SVK	Ján Harbuľák (Released)

=== ŠKF Sereď ===
In: Note: Flags indicate national team as defined under FIFA eligibility rules; some limited exceptions apply. Players may hold more than one non-FIFA nationality.

No.	Pos.	Nation	Player
—	GK	SVK	Matej Kopecký (on loan from FC Nitra)
—	MF	SVK	Denis Čery (on loan from FC Nitra)
—	MF	SVK	Jozef Čertík (from MŠK Rimavská Sobota)
—	FW	SVK	Filip Kolorédy (from MFK Ružomberok)
—	MF	SVK	Pavol Orolín (from FK Pohronie)
—	DF	SVK	Michal Poluch (on loan from FK TEMPO Partizánske)
—	FW	NGR	Michael Chidi Alozie (from Free Agent)
—	DF	SVK	Vladimír Grús (from ŠK Senec)
—	DF	SVK	Peter Ľubomír Balážik (on loan from FK Senica)
—	FW	SVK	Viktor Kráľ (on loan from FC Nitra)
—	FW	SVK	Lukáš Hutta (on loan from ŠK Slovan Bratislava)
—	MF	SVK	Richard Bartoš (on loan from MFK Ružomberok)

Out: Note: Flags indicate national team as defined under FIFA eligibility rules; some limited exceptions apply. Players may hold more than one non-FIFA nationality.

No.	Pos.	Nation	Player
—	FW	SVK	Adam Morong (to FC Nitra)
—	DF	SVK	Kamil Vaško (to FC Pata)
—	MF	SVK	Martin Gál (to ŠK Váhovce)
—	FW	SVK	Tomáš Varhaník (to (Austria) TBA)
—	GK	SVK	Ladislav Rybánsky (to (Hungary) Mezőkövesd-Zsóry SE)
—	MF	SVK	Branislav Hulák (to (Austria) Union Neuhofen/Ybbs)
—	FW	SVK	Richard Prúčny (loan return to FK Slovan Duslo Šaľa)
—	FW	SVK	Martin Jurica (loan return to FK AS Trenčín)

=== FK Slovan Duslo Šaľa ===
In: Note: Flags indicate national team as defined under FIFA eligibility rules; some limited exceptions apply. Players may hold more than one non-FIFA nationality.

No.	Pos.	Nation	Player
—	GK	SVK	Denis Kubica (from FK Senica)
—	DF	SVK	Lukáš Remeň (from MFK Topvar Topoľčany)
—	DF	SVK	Adam Cisár (from MFK Dubnica)
—	MF	SVK	Adam Krčík (from FC Baník Horná Nitra)
—	MF	SVK	Miroslav Sedlák (from FK Senica)
—	DF	SVK	Jakub Kastelovič (from Spartak Myjava)
—	MF	SVK	Martin Janco (from MŠK Považská Bystrica)
—	MF	FRA	Karim Mehdi Guamache (from FC Neded)
—	FW	SVK	Šimon Valachovič (from FC Neded)
—	FW	SVK	Šimon Herceg (from FC Nitra)
—	DF	SVK	Michal Hambalek (from FC Neded)

Out: Note: Flags indicate national team as defined under FIFA eligibility rules; some limited exceptions apply. Players may hold more than one non-FIFA nationality.

No.	Pos.	Nation	Player
—	FW	SVK	Lukás Szabo (loan return to (Czech Republic) FC Slovan Liberec)
—	DF	SVK	Ján Čirik (to OFK Jatov)
—	DF	SVK	Daniel Rehák (to (Austria) USC Wallern)
—	MF	SVK	Marek Tomiš (to (Austria) SC Breitenbrunn)
—	MF	SRB	Goran Matić (to (Bosnia and Herzegovina) FK Velež Mostar)
—	FW	SRB	Samir Nurković (Released)
—	DF	SVK	Richard Konopásek (to OTJ Palárikovo)
—	DF	SVK	Michal Kružlík (to OTJ Palárikovo)
—	DF	SVK	Miloš Fehervári (to FKM Nové Zámky)

=== TJ Iskra Borčice ===
In: Note: Flags indicate national team as defined under FIFA eligibility rules; some limited exceptions apply. Players may hold more than one non-FIFA nationality.

No.	Pos.	Nation	Player
—	DF	SVK	Peter Bašista (from FC VSS Košice)
—	FW	SVK	Ján Novák (from 1. FC Tatran Prešov)
—	GK	SRB	Miloje Preković (from (Serbia) FK Sloga Kraljevo)
—	DF	SVK	Martin Klabník (from TJ OFC Gabčíkovo)
—	DF	SVK	Michal Janec (from (Czech Republic) FC Slovan Liberec)
—	DF	SVK	Tomáš Bagi (on loan from ŠK Slovan Bratislava)
—	MF	SVK	René Revák (on loan from MŠK Žilina B)
—	GK	SVK	Pavol Penksa (from FC DAC 1904 Dunajská Streda)
—	FW	SVK	Marek Kuzma (from Spartak Myjava)
—	FW	SVK	Alan Kováč (on loan from FC DAC 1904 Dunajská Streda)

Out: Note: Flags indicate national team as defined under FIFA eligibility rules; some limited exceptions apply. Players may hold more than one non-FIFA nationality.

No.	Pos.	Nation	Player
—	FW	SVK	Matej Gorelka (on loan to TJ KOVO Beluša)
—	GK	SVK	Ľuboš Zaťko (on loan to OFK Teplička nad Váhom)
—	GK	SVK	Libor Koníček (loan return to MFK Ružomberok)
—	DF	SVK	Marek Kočka (Released)

=== FC VSS Košice ===
In: Note: Flags indicate national team as defined under FIFA eligibility rules; some limited exceptions apply. Players may hold more than one non-FIFA nationality.

No.	Pos.	Nation	Player
—	MF	SVK	Kamil Karaš (from Free agent)
—	MF	SVK	Juraj Hovančík (from Free agent)
—	MF	SVK	Kamil Kuzma (from Free agent)}
—	MF	SVK	Samuel Dancák (from FC VSS Košice youth)}
—	MF	SVK	Dalibor Takáč (from FC VSS Košice youth)}
—	DF	SVK	Radoslav Mikča (from FC VSS Košice youth)}
—	GK	SVK	Andrej Pernecký (on loan from FC DAC 1904 Dunajská Streda)
—	DF	SRB	Ivan Ostojić (from Free agent)
—	FW	FRA	Ibrahim Keita (from (England) Wolverhampton Wanderers F.C.)
—	FW	SVK	Filip Serečin (from Free agent)
—	FW	CAF	Jésus Konnsimbal (from ŠK Senec)

Out: Note: Flags indicate national team as defined under FIFA eligibility rules; some limited exceptions apply. Players may hold more than one non-FIFA nationality.

No.	Pos.	Nation	Player
—	FW	SVK	Erik Pačinda (to FC DAC 1904 Dunajská Streda)
—	DF	SVK	Peter Bašista (Released and joined TJ Iskra Borčice)
—	GK	MKD	Darko Tofiloski (Released and joined MFK Ružomberok)
—	FW	SVK	Ján Novák (loan return to 1. FC Tatran Prešov)
—	DF	SVK	Ľubomír Korijkov (Released and joined FC Lokomotíva Košice)
—	DF	SRB	Ivan Ostojić (Released)
—	DF	SVK	Peter Kavka (Released)
—	DF	SRB	Boris Sekulić (Released and joined ŠK Slovan Bratislava)
—	DF	FRA	Lamine Ndiaye (Released)
—	FW	FRA	Oumar Diaby (to (Bulgaria) PFC Levski Sofia)
—	MF	SVK	Martin Bukata (Released and joined (Poland) Piast Gliwice)
—	MF	SVK	Jozef Skvašík (on loan to MFK Lokomotíva Zvolen)
—	FW	BIH	Nermin Haskić (to MŠK Žilina)
—	GK	BIH	Nikola Stijaković (Released)
—	MF	SVK	Miroslav Viazanko (to FO ŽP Šport Podbrezová)

=== 1. FC Tatran Prešov ===
In: Note: Flags indicate national team as defined under FIFA eligibility rules; some limited exceptions apply. Players may hold more than one non-FIFA nationality.

No.	Pos.	Nation	Player
—	MF	SVK	Miroslav Poliaček (loan return from (Poland) Limanovia Limanowa)
—	FW	SVK	Martin Pribula (loan return from (Poland) Limanovia Limanowa)

Out: Note: Flags indicate national team as defined under FIFA eligibility rules; some limited exceptions apply. Players may hold more than one non-FIFA nationality.

No.	Pos.	Nation	Player
—	MF	SVK	Miroslav Poliaček (Released)
—	FW	SVK	Martin Pribula (to (Poland) Zagłębie Sosnowiec)
—	FW	SVK	Ľuboš Belejík (Released)
—	MF	SVK	Ľubomír Ivanko-Macej (on loan to Partizán Bardejov)

=== MFK Tatran Liptovský Mikuláš ===
In: Note: Flags indicate national team as defined under FIFA eligibility rules; some limited exceptions apply. Players may hold more than one non-FIFA nationality.

No.	Pos.	Nation	Player
—	MF	SVK	Peter Jasenovský (on loan from MŠK Žilina B)
—	FW	SVK	Štefan Gerec (on loan from MFK Ružomberok)
—	MF	SVK	Kristián Hirka (on loan from 1. FC Tatran Prešov)
—	GK	SVK	Miloslav Bréda (from MFK Zemplín Michalovce)
—	DF	SVK	Matej Čurma (on loan from MFK Ružomberok)

Out: Note: Flags indicate national team as defined under FIFA eligibility rules; some limited exceptions apply. Players may hold more than one non-FIFA nationality.

No.	Pos.	Nation	Player
—	GK	SVK	Matúš Macík (on loan to MFK Ružomberok)
—	MF	SVK	Mário Kurák (loan return to TJ Jednota Málinec and loaned to MFK Skalica)
—	FW	SVK	Lukáš Jánošík (loan return to MŠK Žilina B)
—	MF	SVK	Matej Kendera (loan return to TJ Družstevník Liptovská Štiavnica)
—	DF	SVK	Peter Moravčík (loan return to ŠKM Liptovský Hrádok)

=== Partizán Bardejov ===
In: Note: Flags indicate national team as defined under FIFA eligibility rules; some limited exceptions apply. Players may hold more than one non-FIFA nationality.

No.	Pos.	Nation	Player
—	MF	SVK	Ľubomír Ivanko-Macej (on loan from 1. FC Tatran Prešov)
—	DF	SVK	Michal Sipľak (loan return from ŠK Slovan Bratislava)
—	MF	SVK	Juraj Kuhajdík (loan return from MFK Vranov nad Topľou)
—	FW	SVK	Marek Staško (from 1. FC Tatran Prešov)
—	GK	SVK	Richard Gmitter (loan return from MFK Vranov nad Topľou)
—	DF	SVK	Mário Jacko (from Partizán Bardejov youth)
—	DF	SVK	Richard Nemergut (from Partizán Bardejov youth)
—	DF	SVK	Dávid Belúnek (from Partizán Bardejov youth)
—	MF	UKR	Oleksandr Oliinyk (from Partizán Bardejov youth)

Out: Note: Flags indicate national team as defined under FIFA eligibility rules; some limited exceptions apply. Players may hold more than one non-FIFA nationality.

No.	Pos.	Nation	Player
—	GK	SVK	Dušan Molčan (End of professional career)
—	MF	SVK	Lukáš Zápotoka (to TJ KOVO Beluša)
—	MF	SVK	Ján Zápotoka (loan return to FK - Drustav - SK - Hrabovčík and joined FK Poprad)
—	DF	SVK	Michal Kutlík (loan return to MFK Ružomberok)
—	FW	SVK	Ján Guľa (to TBA)
—	DF	SVK	Jakub Bialončík (to TBA)
—	MF	SVK	René Revák (loan return to MŠK Žilina B)
—	MF	SVK	Ladislav Stachura (loan return to ŠK Milénium Bardejovská Nová Ves)
—	DF	SVK	Vladislav Palša (to FK Poprad)

=== MFK Lokomotíva Zvolen ===
In: Note: Flags indicate national team as defined under FIFA eligibility rules; some limited exceptions apply. Players may hold more than one non-FIFA nationality.

No.	Pos.	Nation	Player
—	MF	SVK	Maroš Balko (from FK Dukla Banská Bystrica)
—	MF	SVK	Jozef Skvašík (on loan from FC VSS Košice)

Out: Note: Flags indicate national team as defined under FIFA eligibility rules; some limited exceptions apply. Players may hold more than one non-FIFA nationality.

No.	Pos.	Nation	Player
—	FW	SVK	Matej Starší (Released)
—	MF	SVK	Rudolf Bilas (Released)
—	MF	SVK	Radoslav Krištan (Released)
—	FW	SVK	Marko Lukáč (Released)
—	DF	SVK	Michal Janec (Released)
—	MF	SVK	Martin Válovčan (Released)

=== FK Poprad ===
In: Note: Flags indicate national team as defined under FIFA eligibility rules; some limited exceptions apply. Players may hold more than one non-FIFA nationality.

No.	Pos.	Nation	Player
—	MF	SVK	Ján Zápotoka (from FK - Drustav - SK - Hrabovčík)
—	FW	SVK	Erik Streňo (from Partizán Bardejov)
—	DF	UKR	Bogdan Rudiuk (from FK Bodva Moldava nad Bodvou)
—	FW	SVK	Marko Lukáč (on loan from FO ŽP Šport Podbrezová)
—	MF	SVK	Rudolf Bilas (on loan from MŠK Tesla Stropkov)
—	DF	SVK	Vladislav Palša (from Partizán Bardejov)

Out: Note: Flags indicate national team as defined under FIFA eligibility rules; some limited exceptions apply. Players may hold more than one non-FIFA nationality.

No.	Pos.	Nation	Player
—	FW	SVK	Lukáš Kubus (to (Poland) Wisła Płock)
—	FW	SVK	Erik Maliňák (loan return to MŠK Spišské Podhradie)
—	FW	SVK	Peter Melek (to TJ Družstevník Odorín)
—	MF	SVK	Tomáš Sedlák (loan return to MFK Zemplín Michalovce)

=== FC Lokomotíva Košice ===
In: Note: Flags indicate national team as defined under FIFA eligibility rules; some limited exceptions apply. Players may hold more than one non-FIFA nationality.

No.	Pos.	Nation	Player
—	MF	SVK	Rudolf Urban (from (Poland) Sandecja Nowy Sącz)
—	DF	SVK	Ľubomír Korijkov (from FC VSS Košice)
—	MF	SVK	Erik Micovčák (from (Czech Republic) FC Slovan Liberec)
—	DF	ENG	Tiesse Bi-Le Smith (from (England) Leeds United F.C.)
—	MF	SVK	Adrián Leško (on loan from MFK Zemplín Michalovce)

Out: Note: Flags indicate national team as defined under FIFA eligibility rules; some limited exceptions apply. Players may hold more than one non-FIFA nationality.

No.	Pos.	Nation	Player
—	DF	CZE	Dominik Špavelko (Released)

=== OFK Teplička nad Váhom ===
In: Note: Flags indicate national team as defined under FIFA eligibility rules; some limited exceptions apply. Players may hold more than one non-FIFA nationality.

No.	Pos.	Nation	Player
—	GK	SVK	Dominik Holec (on loan from MŠK Žilina)

Out: Note: Flags indicate national team as defined under FIFA eligibility rules; some limited exceptions apply. Players may hold more than one non-FIFA nationality.

No.	Pos.	Nation	Player
