= List of Slovak football transfers winter 2015–16 =

This is a list of Slovak football transfers in the winter transfer window 2015–2016 by club. Only transfers of the Fortuna Liga and DOXXbet liga are included.

== Fortuna Liga ==
=== FK AS Trenčín ===
In: Note: Flags indicate national team as defined under FIFA eligibility rules; some limited exceptions apply. Players may hold more than one non-FIFA nationality.

No.	Pos.	Nation	Player
—	FW	NGA	Samuel Kalu (from (Nigeria) GBS Football Academy)
—	DF	NGA	Christopher Udeh (from (Nigeria) GBS Football Academy)
—	MF	CHN	Chuang Cchung (from (Portugal) Gondomar S.C.)
—	FW	AUT	Stefan Maierhofer (from Free Agent)
—	MF	SVK	Patrik Kochan (from FK AS Trenčín youth)
—	GK	SVK	Samuel Vavrúš (from FK AS Trenčín youth)

Out: Note: Flags indicate national team as defined under FIFA eligibility rules; some limited exceptions apply. Players may hold more than one non-FIFA nationality.

No.	Pos.	Nation	Player
—	FW	BRA	Wesley (to (Belgium) Club Brugge KV)
—	FW	SVK	Martin Vlček (on loan to FK Inter Bratislava)

=== ŠK Slovan Bratislava ===
In: Note: Flags indicate national team as defined under FIFA eligibility rules; some limited exceptions apply. Players may hold more than one non-FIFA nationality.

No.	Pos.	Nation	Player
—	MF	NED	Joeri de Kamps (from (Netherlands) NAC Breda)
—	DF	GRE	Vasileios Pliatsikas (from Free Agent)
—	MF	RSA	Granwald Scott (from (South Africa) Ajax Cape Town)
—	MF	SVK	Adrián Kopičár (from MŠK Žilina)
—	GK	CZE	Karel Hrubeš (on loan from (Czech Republic) SK Slavia Prague)
—	MF	BIH	Nermin Crnkić (from Free agent)
—	DF	FRA	Claude Dielna (on loan from (England) Sheffield Wednesday F.C.)
—	DF	FRA	Moise Adilehou (from (France) AS Vitré)

Out: Note: Flags indicate national team as defined under FIFA eligibility rules; some limited exceptions apply. Players may hold more than one non-FIFA nationality.

No.	Pos.	Nation	Player
—	DF	ARG	Nicolás Ezequiel Gorosito (Released)
—	DF	SVK	Erik Čikoš (Released)
—	DF	SVK	Dávid Hudák (on loan to MFK Skalica)
—	FW	TRI	Lester Peltier (Released and joined (Kazakhstan) FC Irtysh Pavlodar)
—	MF	SVK	Patrik Sabo (Released)
—	DF	SVK	Timotej Záhumenský (to MFK Skalica)
—	MF	SVK	Samuel Štefánik (on loan to (Poland) Podbeskidzie Bielsko-Biała)
—	GK	SVK	Martin Krnáč (on loan to MFK Skalica)
—	FW	SVK	Karol Mészáros (to (Hungary) Puskás Akadémia FC)
—	MF	SVK	Šimon Štefanec (on loan to (Italy) Hellas Verona F.C.)
—	MF	SVK	Lukáš Gašparovič (on loan to FK Iskra Borčice)

=== Spartak Myjava ===
In: Note: Flags indicate national team as defined under FIFA eligibility rules; some limited exceptions apply. Players may hold more than one non-FIFA nationality.

No.	Pos.	Nation	Player
—	DF	SVK	Ivan Múdry (loan return from AFC Nové Mesto nad Váhom)
—	MF	SVK	Marek Jastráb (loan return from AFC Nové Mesto nad Váhom)
—	MF	SVK	Dávid Copko (loan return from ŠK LR Crystal Lednické Rovne)
—	FW	SVK	Erik Vávra (loan return from ŠK LR Crystal Lednické Rovne)
—	DF	SRB	Ivan Ostojić (from FC VSS Košice)
—	GK	SVK	Libor Koníček (from MFK Ružomberok)
—	DF	SVK	Jaroslav Machovec (from (Czech Republic) SK Dynamo České Budějovice)

Out: Note: Flags indicate national team as defined under FIFA eligibility rules; some limited exceptions apply. Players may hold more than one non-FIFA nationality.

No.	Pos.	Nation	Player
—	FW	SVK	Juraj Piroska (Released and joined MFK Skalica)
—	GK	SVK	Lukáš Urminský (Released)
—	DF	SVK	Peter Jánošík (Released)
—	FW	SVK	Fabián Slančík (loan return to (Czech Republic) FC Zbrojovka Brno)
—	MF	SVK	Karol Karlík (Released)
—	FW	SVK	Dominik Ferenčič (on loan to FC Rohožník)
—	DF	SVK	Denis Švec (to MFK Nová Dubnica)

=== MŠK Žilina ===
In: Note: Flags indicate national team as defined under FIFA eligibility rules; some limited exceptions apply. Players may hold more than one non-FIFA nationality.

No.	Pos.	Nation	Player
—	MF	NGA	Chigozie Emmanuel Mbah (from (England) Brooke House College Football Academy)
—	MF	SRB	Nemanja Stanković (from (Serbia) FK Donji Srem)
—	DF	SVK	Branislav Šušolík (from MŠK Žilina youth)
—	DF	CZE	Ondřej Švejdík (on loan from (Czech Republic) AC Sparta Prague)
—	MF	ARG	Iván Díaz (from (Argentina) River Plate)

Out: Note: Flags indicate national team as defined under FIFA eligibility rules; some limited exceptions apply. Players may hold more than one non-FIFA nationality.

No.	Pos.	Nation	Player
—	DF	SVK	Andrej Kadlec (to FC Spartak Trnava)
—	MF	SVK	Adrián Kopičár (Released and joined ŠK Slovan Bratislava)
—	DF	SVK	Jozef Piaček (Released and joined (Poland) Podbeskidzie)
23	MF	SVK	Jaroslav Mihalík (to (Czech Republic) SK Slavia Prague)
—	GK	SVK	Dominik Holec (on loan to FK Pohronie)
—	FW	SVK	Lukáš Čmelík (on loan to (Switzerland) FC Sion)
—	FW	BRA	William (to (Turkey) Kayserispor)
—	DF	SVK	Milan Škriniar (to (Italy) Sampdoria)

=== FC DAC 1904 Dunajská Streda ===
In: Note: Flags indicate national team as defined under FIFA eligibility rules; some limited exceptions apply. Players may hold more than one non-FIFA nationality.

No.	Pos.	Nation	Player
—	DF	SVK	Tomáš Huk (from FC VSS Košice)
—	DF	SRB	Marko Živković (from (Lithuania) FK Sūduva Marijampolė)
—	DF	SVK	Slavomír Pagáč (from FC DAC 1904 Dunajská Streda youth)
—	FW	SVK	Roman Maximilián Kollár (from FC DAC 1904 Dunajská Streda youth)
—	DF	SVK	Dezider Egri (from FC DAC 1904 Dunajská Streda II)

Out: Note: Flags indicate national team as defined under FIFA eligibility rules; some limited exceptions apply. Players may hold more than one non-FIFA nationality.

No.	Pos.	Nation	Player
—	FW	SVK	Pavol Jurčo (Released)
—	DF	SVK	Matúš Turňa (Released and joined FO ŽP Šport Podbrezová)
—	MF	SVK	Tamás Lénárth (Released and joined Győri ETO Futsal Club)

=== FC Spartak Trnava ===
In: Note: Flags indicate national team as defined under FIFA eligibility rules; some limited exceptions apply. Players may hold more than one non-FIFA nationality.

No.	Pos.	Nation	Player
—	DF	SVK	Andrej Kadlec (from MŠK Žilina)
—	MF	BEN	Bello Babatounde (from (Czech Republic) Jihlava)
—	MF	SVK	Róbert Jež (from (Poland) Górnik Zabrze)
—	FW	CMR	Robert Ndip Tambe (from (Poland) LZS Piotrówka)
—	DF	SVK	Denis Horník (from FC Spartak Trnava youth)
—	DF	SVK	Matej Oravec (from FC Spartak Trnava youth)
—	MF	SVK	Martin Košťál (from FC Spartak Trnava youth)
—	MF	SVK	Filip Bango (from FC Spartak Trnava youth)

Out: Note: Flags indicate national team as defined under FIFA eligibility rules; some limited exceptions apply. Players may hold more than one non-FIFA nationality.

No.	Pos.	Nation	Player
—	MF	MLI	Niaré Benogo (loan return to (Ghana) International Allies F.C.)
—	DF	SVK	Ľuboš Hanzel (Released and joined TJ Iskra Borčice)
—	DF	SVK	Patrik Čarnota (Released and joined (Austria) SV Gaflenz)
—	DF	SVK	Milan Bortel (Released and joined (Austria) SV Horn)
—	FW	SVK	Jakub Vojtuš (Released and joined (Romania) FC Universitatea Cluj)
—	GK	SRB	Bojan Knežević (Released and joined (Serbia) FK Inđija)
—	MF	ESP	José Casado (Released and joined (Romania) FC Botoșani)
—	FW	BIH	Haris Harba (loan return to (Czech Republic) Jihlava)
—	DF	SVK	Marek Janečka (Released and joined (Czech Republic) MFK Karviná)

=== FK Senica ===
In: Note: Flags indicate national team as defined under FIFA eligibility rules; some limited exceptions apply. Players may hold more than one non-FIFA nationality.

No.	Pos.	Nation	Player
—	MF	SVK	Dávid Leško (from 1. FC Tatran Prešov)
—	MF	SVK	Adam Morong (from FC Nitra)
—	DF	BIH	Adi Mehremić (from (Czech Republic) MFK Frýdek-Místek)
—	GK	SVK	František Plach (from FK Pohronie)
—	MF	SVK	Šimon Šmehýl (from FC Nitra)
—	FW	SVK	Ladislav Almási (from FK Senica youth)

Out: Note: Flags indicate national team as defined under FIFA eligibility rules; some limited exceptions apply. Players may hold more than one non-FIFA nationality.

No.	Pos.	Nation	Player
—	MF	SVK	Pavol Cicman (Released)
—	GK	SVK	Patrik Lukáč (Released)
—	MF	CZE	Tomáš Vengřinek (loan return to (Czech Republic) FC Baník Ostrava)
—	MF	CZE	Jan Kalabiška (to (Czech Republic) FK Mladá Boleslav)

=== MFK Ružomberok ===
In: Note: Flags indicate national team as defined under FIFA eligibility rules; some limited exceptions apply. Players may hold more than one non-FIFA nationality.

No.	Pos.	Nation	Player
—	GK	SVK	Ľuboš Hajdúch (from MFK Skalica)
—	MF	SVK	Peter Gál-Andrezly (from FO ŽP Šport Podbrezová)
—	MF	CZE	Adam Kučera (from (Czech Republic) AC Sparta Prague)
—	MF	SVK	Erik Liener (loan return from MFK Lokomotíva Zvolen)

Out: Note: Flags indicate national team as defined under FIFA eligibility rules; some limited exceptions apply. Players may hold more than one non-FIFA nationality.

No.	Pos.	Nation	Player
—	GK	SVK	Štefan Senecký (Released)
—	FW	SVK	Pavol Masaryk (Released and joined MFK Skalica)
—	MF	SVK	Erik Liener (to FK Iskra Borčice)
—	MF	MDA	Anatol Cheptine (Released)
—	GK	SVK	Tomáš Lešňovský (Released)
—	FW	SVK	Boris Turčák (Released)
—	MF	SVK	Matej Lovás (on loan to ŠKF Sereď)
—	MF	SVK	Viktor Miklós (loan return to ŠK Slovan Bratislava)
—	GK	SVK	Matúš Macík
—	MF	SVK	Miroslav Almaský
—	GK	SVK	Libor Koníček (to Spartak Myjava)

=== FC ViOn Zlaté Moravce ===
In: Note: Flags indicate national team as defined under FIFA eligibility rules; some limited exceptions apply. Players may hold more than one non-FIFA nationality.

No.	Pos.	Nation	Player
—	GK	SVN	Michael Lovrec (from (Slovenia) NK Maribor)
—	MF	SVK	Damián Bariš (on loan from FK AS Trenčín)
—	MF	SVK	Marek Kuzma (from FK Iskra Borčice)
—	FW	SVK	Fabián Slančík (on loan from (Czech Republic) FC Zbrojovka Brno)
—	MF	SVK	Karol Karlík (from Spartak Myjava)
—	FW	SVK	Róbert Gešnábel (from FK Slovan Duslo Šaľa)

Out: Note: Flags indicate national team as defined under FIFA eligibility rules; some limited exceptions apply. Players may hold more than one non-FIFA nationality.

No.	Pos.	Nation	Player
—	FW	CRO	Armando Mance (Released and joined (Bosnia and Herzegovina) FK Borac Banja Luka)
—	DF	BIH	Ivan Mršić (Released)
—	DF	SRB	Stefan Milojević (Released)
—	MF	SVN	Marko Kovjenić (Released)
—	GK	SVN	Marko Ranilović (Released and joined (Slovenia) NK Zavrč)
—	DF	CRO	Mario Burić (to (Croatia) NK Slaven Belupo)
—	FW	CRO	Denis Bochl (to (Croatia) NK Zagorec Krapina)
—	GK	LVA	Maksims Uvarenko (to (Latvia) FK Ventspils)
—	FW	CMR	Léandre Tawamba (to (Kazakhstan) FC Kairat)

=== MFK Zemplín Michalovce ===
In: Note: Flags indicate national team as defined under FIFA eligibility rules; some limited exceptions apply. Players may hold more than one non-FIFA nationality.

No.	Pos.	Nation	Player
—	GK	CZE	Patrik Macej (loan return from FC Lokomotíva Košice)
—	FW	SVK	Filip Serečin (from FC VSS Košice)
—	FW	RUS	Maxim Votinov (from (Russia) FC Luch-Energiya Vladivostok)
—	DF	BLR	Aleksandr Sverchinskiy (from (Belarus) FC Minsk)
—	MF	SRB	Nikola Lukić (from (Belarus) FC Minsk)
—	MF	GRE	Kyriakos Savvidis (on loan from (Greece) PAOK FC)
—	MF	GRE	Panagiotis Deligiannidis (on loan from (Greece) PAOK FC)

Out: Note: Flags indicate national team as defined under FIFA eligibility rules; some limited exceptions apply. Players may hold more than one non-FIFA nationality.

No.	Pos.	Nation	Player
—	DF	ESP	Antonio García Montero (End of contract (joined (Gibraltar) Europa FC))
—	FW	NGA	Peter Nworah (Released and joined (Czech Republic) FC Hradec Králové)
—	DF	ESP	Eric Barroso (Released and joined (Spain) Conil CF)
—	DF	ESP	Joan Caballero (Released and joined (Spain) CD Acero)
—	FW	GHA	Emmanuel Mensah (Released and joined (Czech Republic) MFK Frýdek-Místek)

=== FO ŽP Šport Podbrezová ===
In: Note: Flags indicate national team as defined under FIFA eligibility rules; some limited exceptions apply. Players may hold more than one non-FIFA nationality.

No.	Pos.	Nation	Player
—	DF	SVK	Jaroslav Kostelný (from FC Nitra)
—	DF	SVK	Ján Krivák (from (Austria) SV Ferschnitz)
—	GK	SVK	Patrik Lukáč (from FK Senica)
—	MF	MKD	Dejan Peševski (from FK Dukla Banská Bystrica)
—	FW	SVK	Pavol Šafranko (on loan from 1. FC Tatran Prešov)
—	DF	SRB	Lazar Đorđević (from FC VSS Košice)
—	DF	SVK	Matúš Turňa (from FC DAC 1904 Dunajská Streda)
—	DF	SVK	Daniel Magda (from FO ŽP Šport Podbrezová youth)
—	MF	SVK	René Duda (from FO ŽP Šport Podbrezová youth)
—	GK	SVK	Branislav Pavol (from FO ŽP Šport Podbrezová youth)
—	DF	CZE	Václav Ježdík (on loan from (Czech Republic) FC Baník Ostrava)

Out: Note: Flags indicate national team as defined under FIFA eligibility rules; some limited exceptions apply. Players may hold more than one non-FIFA nationality.

No.	Pos.	Nation	Player
20	DF	SUI	Stefan Marinković (Released)
14	FW	SVK	Adam Žilák (Released and joined TJ Iskra Borčice)
13	DF	BRA	Bernardo Frizoni (Released)
—	MF	SVK	Peter Gál-Andrezly (to MFK Ružomberok)
27	GK	SVK	Juraj Baláž (Released)
—	GK	SVK	Ján Ďurčo (Released)
—	DF	CZE	Jiří Pimpara (loan return to (Czech Republic) FC Slovan Liberec)
—	MF	SVK	Mário Almaský (Released)
—	MF	BIH	Mirzad Mehanović (to (Czech Republic) FK Mladá Boleslav)
—	FW	SRB	Alen Melunović
—	MF	SVK	Tomáš Galo

=== MFK Skalica ===
In: Note: Flags indicate national team as defined under FIFA eligibility rules; some limited exceptions apply. Players may hold more than one non-FIFA nationality.

No.	Pos.	Nation	Player
—	DF	SVK	Dávid Hudák (on loan from ŠK Slovan Bratislava)
—	DF	SVK	Timotej Záhumenský (from ŠK Slovan Bratislava)
—	FW	CZE	David Štrombach (on loan from (Czech Republic) FC Zbrojovka Brno)
—	DF	SVK	Lukáš Hlavatovič (from ŠK Senec)
—	GK	SVK	Miloslav Bréda (from MFK Tatran Liptovský Mikuláš)
—	GK	SVK	Martin Krnáč (on loan from ŠK Slovan Bratislava)
—	DF	SVK	Martin Dobrotka (from Free agent)
—	MF	NGA	Ikenna Hilary (from (Malta) Valletta F.C.)
—	FW	SVK	Juraj Piroska (from Spartak Myjava)
—	FW	SVK	Pavol Masaryk (from MFK Ružomberok)

Out: Note: Flags indicate national team as defined under FIFA eligibility rules; some limited exceptions apply. Players may hold more than one non-FIFA nationality.

No.	Pos.	Nation	Player
—	FW	SVK	Ivan Lietava (loan return to (Czech Republic) Bohemians 1905)
—	DF	CZE	Lukáš Fialka (loan return to (Czech Republic) SK Slavia Prague)
—	MF	SVK	Mário Kurák (loan return to Jednota Málinec)
—	GK	SVK	Ľuboš Hajdúch (Released and joined MFK Ružomberok)
—	FW	SVK	Michal Gašparík (Released)
—	DF	SVK	Roman Konečný (Released)
—	MF	SVK	Damián Bariš (loan return to FK AS Trenčín)
—	DF	SVK	Andrej Petrovský (End of contract)
—	GK	CZE	Michal Lupač (Released)

== DOXXbet liga ==
=== FK Pohronie ===
In: Note: Flags indicate national team as defined under FIFA eligibility rules; some limited exceptions apply. Players may hold more than one non-FIFA nationality.

No.	Pos.	Nation	Player
—	GK	SVK	Dominik Holec (on loan from MŠK Žilina)
—	FW	SVK	Viktor Bališ (from OFK Dunajská Lužná)
—	MF	SVK	Daniel Hudák (from TJ Baník Štiavnické Bane)
—	DF	SVK	Peter Leško (on loan from 1. FC Tatran Prešov)

Out: Note: Flags indicate national team as defined under FIFA eligibility rules; some limited exceptions apply. Players may hold more than one non-FIFA nationality.

No.	Pos.	Nation	Player
—	GK	SVK	František Plach (to FK Senica)
—	MF	SVK	Miroslav Gregáň (on loan to (Czech Republic) FK Teplice)

=== FK Iskra Borčice ===
In: Note: Flags indicate national team as defined under FIFA eligibility rules; some limited exceptions apply. Players may hold more than one non-FIFA nationality.

No.	Pos.	Nation	Player
—	MF	SVK	Adam Žilák (from FO ŽP Šport Podbrezová)
—	FW	SVK	Juraj Halenár (from (Czech Republic) SK Sigma Olomouc)
—	DF	SVK	Ľuboš Hanzel (from Free agent)
—	DF	COL	Joan Herrera (from (Colombia) Boyacá Chicó F.C.)
—	DF	SVK	Marián Štrbák (on loan from FC ViOn Zlaté Moravce)
—	GK	SVK	Dalibor Rožník (from MŠK - Thermál Veľký Meder)
—	MF	SVK	Erik Liener (from MFK Ružomberok)
—	MF	SVK	Lukáš Gašparovič (on loan from ŠK Slovan Bratislava)
—	GK	SVK	Pavol Bajza (on loan from (Slovenia) NK Zavrč)
—	DF	KOS	Leotrim Bekteshi (from (Kosovo) KF Besa Pejë)
—	MF	KOS	Ibrahim Peci (from (Kosovo) KF Feronikeli)

Out: Note: Flags indicate national team as defined under FIFA eligibility rules; some limited exceptions apply. Players may hold more than one non-FIFA nationality.

No.	Pos.	Nation	Player
—	MF	SVK	René Revák (loan return to MŠK Žilina II)
—	DF	SVK	Michal Janec
—	FW	SVK	Marek Kuzma (to FC ViOn Zlaté Moravce)
—	DF	SRB	Aleksandar Plavšić (on loan to AFC Nové Mesto nad Váhom)
—	MF	SRB	Miloš Plavšić (on loan to AFC Nové Mesto nad Váhom)
—	MF	SVK	Michal Živčic (on loan to AFC Nové Mesto nad Váhom)

=== MŠK Žilina B ===
In: Note: Flags indicate national team as defined under FIFA eligibility rules; some limited exceptions apply. Players may hold more than one non-FIFA nationality.

No.	Pos.	Nation	Player
—	MF	SVK	René Revák (loan return from FK Iskra Borčice)
—	GK	SVK	Martin Leško (from FC VSS Košice)

Out: Note: Flags indicate national team as defined under FIFA eligibility rules; some limited exceptions apply. Players may hold more than one non-FIFA nationality.

No.	Pos.	Nation	Player

=== AFC Nové Mesto nad Váhom ===
In: Note: Flags indicate national team as defined under FIFA eligibility rules; some limited exceptions apply. Players may hold more than one non-FIFA nationality.

No.	Pos.	Nation	Player
—	DF	SRB	Aleksandar Plavšić (on loan from FK Iskra Borčice)
—	MF	SRB	Miloš Plavšić (on loan from FK Iskra Borčice)
—	MF	SVK	Michal Živčic (on loan from FK Iskra Borčice)
—	DF	SVK	Michal Ranko (on loan from FK AS Trenčín)

Out: Note: Flags indicate national team as defined under FIFA eligibility rules; some limited exceptions apply. Players may hold more than one non-FIFA nationality.

No.	Pos.	Nation	Player
—	DF	SVK	Filip Kutaj (to (Germany) SpVgg Bayern Hof)
—	MF	SVK	Andrej Urban (loan return to MFK Dubnica and joined (Austria) SV Haitzendorf)
—	DF	SVK	Martin Jurkovič (loan return to FC Baník Horná Nitra)
—	DF	SVK	Ivan Múdry (loan return to Spartak Myjava)
—	MF	SVK	Marek Jastráb (loan return to Spartak Myjava)

=== ŠKF Sereď ===
In: Note: Flags indicate national team as defined under FIFA eligibility rules; some limited exceptions apply. Players may hold more than one non-FIFA nationality.

No.	Pos.	Nation	Player
—	DF	SVK	Martin Mečiar (on loan from Spartak Trnava juniori)
—	DF	SEN	Tidiane Djiby Ba (on loan from Spartak Trnava juniori)
—	DF	FRA	Guy Richi Pellet (from MFK Lokomotíva Zvolen)
—	FW	SVK	Matej Lovás (on loan from MFK Ružomberok)
—	DF	SVK	Ján Štajer (from FC Slovan Galanta)
—	FW	COD	Elvis Mashike Sukisa (from FC Slovan Galanta)
—	MF	SVK	Dmitrij Korman (on loan from FC ViOn Zlaté Moravce)

Out: Note: Flags indicate national team as defined under FIFA eligibility rules; some limited exceptions apply. Players may hold more than one non-FIFA nationality.

No.	Pos.	Nation	Player
—	MF	SVK	Pavol Orolín (to (Sweden) Syrianska IF Kerburan)
—	DF	SVK	Roman Tarek (to (Austria) ASV Neudorf/Parndorf)
—	FW	SVK	Viktor Kráľ (loan return to FC Nitra)
—	DF	SVK	Richard Hulák (to (Austria) USV Atzenbrugg-Heiligeneich)
—	DF	SVK	Michal Poluch (loan return to FK Tempo Partizánske)
—	MF	SVK	Filip Kolorédy (to (Germany) TV Bad Grönenbach)

=== FC Nitra ===
In: Note: Flags indicate national team as defined under FIFA eligibility rules; some limited exceptions apply. Players may hold more than one non-FIFA nationality.

No.	Pos.	Nation	Player
—	MF	SVK	Marcel Oravec (from Slovan Bratislava juniori)
—	MF	COD	Aurélien Ngeyitala (from ŠK Senec)
—	DF	SVK	Juraj Križko (from Free agent)
—	DF	CZE	Petr Trapp (from (Albania) Flamurtari Vlorë)
—	FW	CZE	Martin Vodička (from (Czech Republic) FK Baník Most)
—	DF	SVK	Patrik Pavlenda (from TJ Slovan Čeľadice)
—	GK	SVK	Dušan Kolmokov (from FK Slovan Duslo Šaľa)

Out: Note: Flags indicate national team as defined under FIFA eligibility rules; some limited exceptions apply. Players may hold more than one non-FIFA nationality.

No.	Pos.	Nation	Player
—	FW	SVK	Matúš Paukner (Released and joined (Hungary) Békéscsaba)
—	MF	SVK	Adam Morong (Released and joined FK Senica)
—	MF	SVK	Peter Petráš (Released and joined FK Inter Bratislava)
—	MF	CZE	Michal Rakovan (Released)
—	FW	SVK	Šimon Šmehýl (Released and joined FK Senica)
—	FW	SVK	Henrich Benčík (Released)
—	DF	SVK	Marek Dubeň (Released and joined (Poland) Radomiak Radom)
—	DF	SVK	Igor Kotora (Released)
—	DF	SVK	Jaroslav Kostelný (Released and joined Podbrezová)

=== OFK Dunajská Lužná ===
In: Note: Flags indicate national team as defined under FIFA eligibility rules; some limited exceptions apply. Players may hold more than one non-FIFA nationality.

No.	Pos.	Nation	Player

Out: Note: Flags indicate national team as defined under FIFA eligibility rules; some limited exceptions apply. Players may hold more than one non-FIFA nationality.

No.	Pos.	Nation	Player
—	DF	SVK	Ján Marcin (to (Sweden) Syrianska IF Kerburan)
—	FW	SVK	Viktor Bališ (to FK Pohronie)

=== FK Dukla Banská Bystrica ===
In: Note: Flags indicate national team as defined under FIFA eligibility rules; some limited exceptions apply. Players may hold more than one non-FIFA nationality.

No.	Pos.	Nation	Player
—	MF	SVK	Mário Kurák (on loan from TJ Jednota Málinec)
—	DF	SRB	Filip Ungar (from FC ViOn Zlaté Moravce)
—	DF	GRE	Nikos Pantidos (from Free Agent)
—	MF	BIH	Faris Handžić (from Free Agent)
—	DF	NED	Haris Memić (from (Netherlands) RKVV DESO - Van der horst)
—	FW	SRB	Aleksandar Stanković (from (Switzerland) FC Liestal)
—	MF	SVK	Pavol Poliaček (from TJ Stráža)

Out: Note: Flags indicate national team as defined under FIFA eligibility rules; some limited exceptions apply. Players may hold more than one non-FIFA nationality.

No.	Pos.	Nation	Player
—	MF	MKD	Dejan Peševski (to Podbrezová)
—	MF	SVK	Michal Šufliarsky (loan return to MFK Spartak Hriňová)
—	GK	SVK	Ján Polóny (loan return to JUPIE Podlavice Badín)
—	DF	SRB	Milan Nikolić (to (Philippines) Global F.C.)
—	DF	SVK	Július Gombala (loan return to FK Senica)
—	MF	SVK	Jozef Rejdovian (loan return to FC ViOn Zlaté Moravce)
—	DF	SVK	Marián Had (End of contract)
—	DF	SVK	Miroslav Gálik (on loan to FTC Fiľakovo)
—	MF	BIH	Belmin Mazić (to (Bosnia and Herzegovina) NK Slaven Živinice)
—	FW	CRO	Viktor Lekaj (to (Croatia) NK Neretvanac Opuzen)
—	MF	BIH	Momir Zečević (to (Bosnia and Herzegovina) FK Slavija Sarajevo)

=== FK Slovan Duslo Šaľa ===
In: Note: Flags indicate national team as defined under FIFA eligibility rules; some limited exceptions apply. Players may hold more than one non-FIFA nationality.

No.	Pos.	Nation	Player
—	FW	UKR	Illya Cherednychenko (on loan from FKM Nové Zámky)
—	GK	SVK	Róbert Bačík (from MFK Topvar Topoľčany)
—	MF	SVK	Peter Lipták (from 1. FC Tatran Prešov)
—	MF	SVK	Rajmund Mikuš (from FC ŠTK 1914 Šamorín)

Out: Note: Flags indicate national team as defined under FIFA eligibility rules; some limited exceptions apply. Players may hold more than one non-FIFA nationality.

No.	Pos.	Nation	Player
—	MF	SVK	Sinan Medgyes (to Spartak Trnava juniori)
—	GK	SVK	Dušan Kolmokov (to FC Nitra)
—	FW	SVK	Martin Janco (loan return to MŠK Považská Bystrica)
—	DF	SVK	Denis Švec (loan return to Spartak Myjava)
—	FW	SVK	Róbert Gešnábel (to FC ViOn Zlaté Moravce)

=== ŠK Slovan Bratislava juniori ===
In: Note: Flags indicate national team as defined under FIFA eligibility rules; some limited exceptions apply. Players may hold more than one non-FIFA nationality.

No.	Pos.	Nation	Player
—	MF	SVK	Marcel Oravec (loan return from ŠK Senec)

Out: Note: Flags indicate national team as defined under FIFA eligibility rules; some limited exceptions apply. Players may hold more than one non-FIFA nationality.

No.	Pos.	Nation	Player
—	FW	SVK	Filip Ďuriš (on loan to (Slovenia) NK Zavrč)

=== ŠK Senec ===
In: Note: Flags indicate national team as defined under FIFA eligibility rules; some limited exceptions apply. Players may hold more than one non-FIFA nationality.

No.	Pos.	Nation	Player
—	FW	SVK	Martin Janco (on loan from MŠK Považská Bystrica)

Out: Note: Flags indicate national team as defined under FIFA eligibility rules; some limited exceptions apply. Players may hold more than one non-FIFA nationality.

No.	Pos.	Nation	Player
—	DF	SVK	Lukáš Hlavatovič (to MFK Skalica)
—	MF	SVK	Marcel Oravec (loan return to Slovan Bratislava juniori)
—	MF	COD	Aurélien Ngeyitala (to FC Nitra)
—	MF	SVK	Márk Winkler (to FC Slovan Galanta)
—	FW	SVK	Karol Pavelka (to (Austria) SC 08 Schwanenstadt)
—	FW	SVK	Christian Libič (to (Austria) UFC Weiden am See)

=== FC Spartak Trnava juniori ===
In: Note: Flags indicate national team as defined under FIFA eligibility rules; some limited exceptions apply. Players may hold more than one non-FIFA nationality.

No.	Pos.	Nation	Player
—	DF	SVK	Roman Častulín (from MFK Nová Dubnica)
—	MF	SVK	Sinan Medgyes (from FK Slovan Duslo Šaľa)
—	FW	SVK	Boris Bališ (loan return from ŠK Senec)

Out: Note: Flags indicate national team as defined under FIFA eligibility rules; some limited exceptions apply. Players may hold more than one non-FIFA nationality.

No.	Pos.	Nation	Player
—	DF	SVK	Martin Mečiar (on loan to ŠKF Sereď)
—	DF	SEN	Tidiane Djiby Ba (on loan to ŠKF Sereď)
—	FW	SVK	Ivan Pikulík
—	DF	SVK	Michal Habánek (to (Sweden) Syrianska IF Kerburan)

=== FC VSS Košice ===
In: Note: Flags indicate national team as defined under FIFA eligibility rules; some limited exceptions apply. Players may hold more than one non-FIFA nationality.

No.	Pos.	Nation	Player
—	GK	SVK	Marián Kello (from Free agent)
—	FW	COD	Mulumba Mukendi (from FC Jelka)
—	MF	SVK	Lukáš Janič (from (Poland) Podbeskidzie Bielsko-Biała)
—	FW	SVK	Pavol Jurčo (on loan from FC DAC 1904 Dunajská Streda)
—	DF	FRA	Jean-Pierre Morgan (Free agent)

Out: Note: Flags indicate national team as defined under FIFA eligibility rules; some limited exceptions apply. Players may hold more than one non-FIFA nationality.

No.	Pos.	Nation	Player
—	GK	SVK	Andrej Pernecký (Released)
—	MF	SVK	Martin Bukata (to (Poland) Piast Gliwice)
—	FW	SVK	Filip Serečin (End of contract)
—	DF	SRB	Lazar Đorđević (to FO ŽP Šport Podbrezová)
—	DF	SVK	František Pavúk (Released)
—	FW	SVN	Ajdin Redžić (Released)
—	FW	FRA	Ibrahim Keita (Released)
—	DF	SRB	Ivan Ostojić (to Spartak Myjava)
—	DF	SVK	Tomáš Huk (to FC DAC 1904 Dunajská Streda)
—	GK	SVK	Martin Leško (to MŠK Žilina)

=== 1. FC Tatran Prešov ===
In: Note: Flags indicate national team as defined under FIFA eligibility rules; some limited exceptions apply. Players may hold more than one non-FIFA nationality.

No.	Pos.	Nation	Player
—	FW	SVK	Pavol Cicman (from FK Senica)
—	DF	SVK	Richard Kačala (from MFK Lokomotíva Zvolen)
—	MF	SVK	Viliam Macko (from (Maldives) New Radiant S.C.)
—	FW	BIH	Nermin Hadzić (from (Oman) Al-Wahda SC)

Out: Note: Flags indicate national team as defined under FIFA eligibility rules; some limited exceptions apply. Players may hold more than one non-FIFA nationality.

No.	Pos.	Nation	Player
—	MF	SVK	Dávid Leško (to FK Senica)
—	FW	SVK	Pavol Šafranko (on loan to FO ŽP Šport Podbrezová)
—	DF	SVK	Peter Leško (on loan to FK Pohronie)
—	MF	SVK	Peter Lipták (to FK Slovan Duslo Šaľa)

=== MFK Tatran Liptovský Mikuláš ===
In: Note: Flags indicate national team as defined under FIFA eligibility rules; some limited exceptions apply. Players may hold more than one non-FIFA nationality.

No.	Pos.	Nation	Player

Out: Note: Flags indicate national team as defined under FIFA eligibility rules; some limited exceptions apply. Players may hold more than one non-FIFA nationality.

No.	Pos.	Nation	Player
—	DF	SVK	Matej Čurma (loan return to MFK Ružomberok)
—	GK	SVK	Miloslav Bréda (to MFK Skalica)

=== MFK Lokomotíva Zvolen ===
In: Note: Flags indicate national team as defined under FIFA eligibility rules; some limited exceptions apply. Players may hold more than one non-FIFA nationality.

No.	Pos.	Nation	Player
—	DF	SVK	Matej Čurma (on loan from MFK Ružomberok)

Out: Note: Flags indicate national team as defined under FIFA eligibility rules; some limited exceptions apply. Players may hold more than one non-FIFA nationality.

No.	Pos.	Nation	Player
—	MF	SVK	Erik Liener (loan return to MFK Ružomberok)
—	DF	FRA	Guy Richi Pellet (to ŠKF Sereď)

=== FK Poprad ===
In: Note: Flags indicate national team as defined under FIFA eligibility rules; some limited exceptions apply. Players may hold more than one non-FIFA nationality.

No.	Pos.	Nation	Player
—	MF	POL	Szymon Gruca (from Partizán Bardejov)
—	DF	SVK	Slavomír Kica (from Partizán Bardejov)
—	FW	SVK	Arnold Šimonek (from OFK 1948 Veľký Lapáš)
—	FW	CRO	Pëllumb Jusufi (from (Finland) Musan Salama)

Out: Note: Flags indicate national team as defined under FIFA eligibility rules; some limited exceptions apply. Players may hold more than one non-FIFA nationality.

No.	Pos.	Nation	Player
—	DF	SVK	Matúš Bendík (Released/study in Australia)
—	DF	UKR	Bogdan Rudiuk (Released)

=== Partizán Bardejov ===
In: Note: Flags indicate national team as defined under FIFA eligibility rules; some limited exceptions apply. Players may hold more than one non-FIFA nationality.

No.	Pos.	Nation	Player
—	DF	FRA	Andrely Kouessabio Makela (from (Latvia) FK 1625 Liepāja)

Out: Note: Flags indicate national team as defined under FIFA eligibility rules; some limited exceptions apply. Players may hold more than one non-FIFA nationality.

No.	Pos.	Nation	Player
—	MF	POL	Szymon Gruca (to FK Poprad)
—	DF	SVK	Slavomír Kica (to FK Poprad)

=== FC Lokomotíva Košice ===
In: Note: Flags indicate national team as defined under FIFA eligibility rules; some limited exceptions apply. Players may hold more than one non-FIFA nationality.

No.	Pos.	Nation	Player
—	DF	SVK	František Pavúk (from FC VSS Košice)
—	DF	SVK	Radoslav Kamenec (from MFK Lokomotíva Zvolen)
—	MF	SVK	Radoslav Človečko (from FK Košice – Krásna)

Out: Note: Flags indicate national team as defined under FIFA eligibility rules; some limited exceptions apply. Players may hold more than one non-FIFA nationality.

No.	Pos.	Nation	Player
—	MF	SVK	Tomáš Labun (Released)
—	FW	SVK	Michal Vilkovský (Released)
—	MF	SVK	Pavol Ruskovský (Released)
—	DF	SVK	Marek Petričko (on loan to FK Košice – Krásna)

=== FK Haniska ===
In: Note: Flags indicate national team as defined under FIFA eligibility rules; some limited exceptions apply. Players may hold more than one non-FIFA nationality.

No.	Pos.	Nation	Player

Out: Note: Flags indicate national team as defined under FIFA eligibility rules; some limited exceptions apply. Players may hold more than one non-FIFA nationality.

No.	Pos.	Nation	Player
—	DF	SVK	Peter Leško (loan return to 1. FC Tatran Prešov)
—	FW	SVK	Miroslav Seman (loan return to FC VSS Košice)

=== MFK Dolný Kubín ===
- withdrew from the league due to financial problems

=== FK Spišská Nová Ves ===
In: Note: Flags indicate national team as defined under FIFA eligibility rules; some limited exceptions apply. Players may hold more than one non-FIFA nationality.

No.	Pos.	Nation	Player

Out: Note: Flags indicate national team as defined under FIFA eligibility rules; some limited exceptions apply. Players may hold more than one non-FIFA nationality.

No.	Pos.	Nation	Player

=== OFK Teplička nad Váhom ===
In: Note: Flags indicate national team as defined under FIFA eligibility rules; some limited exceptions apply. Players may hold more than one non-FIFA nationality.

No.	Pos.	Nation	Player

Out: Note: Flags indicate national team as defined under FIFA eligibility rules; some limited exceptions apply. Players may hold more than one non-FIFA nationality.

No.	Pos.	Nation	Player
—	GK	SVK	Dominik Holec (loan return MŠK Žilina B)

=== MŠK Rimavská Sobota ===
In: Note: Flags indicate national team as defined under FIFA eligibility rules; some limited exceptions apply. Players may hold more than one non-FIFA nationality.

No.	Pos.	Nation	Player
—	MF	JPN	Shotaro Hattori (from (Latvia) FK Auda)
—	FW	NOR	Daniel Forlandsas (on loan from FK Slavoj Trebišov)
—	DF	SVK	Martin Eštok (on loan from MFK Vranov nad Topľou)
—	DF	SVK	Richard Nemergut (on loan from Partizán Bardejov)
—	MF	SVK	Miroslav Almaský (on loan from MFK Ružomberok)
—	GK	SVK	Martin Brza (on loan from FK Bodva Moldava nad Bodvou)
—	DF	UKR	Bogdan Rudiuk (on loan from FK Poprad)

Out: Note: Flags indicate national team as defined under FIFA eligibility rules; some limited exceptions apply. Players may hold more than one non-FIFA nationality.

No.	Pos.	Nation	Player
—	FW	SVK	Patrik Husaník (to FTC Fiľakovo)
—	MF	SVK	Máté Köböl (to (Hungary) Somos SE)

== See also ==
- 2015–16 Fortuna Liga
