= Jozef Medgyes =

Slovak footballer (born 1985)

Personal information
- Full name: Jozef Medgyes
- Date of birth: 31 July 1985 (age 41)
- Place of birth: Czechoslovakia
- Height: 1.84 m (6 ft 1/2 in)
- Position: Centre back

Team information
- Current team: Družstevník Topoľníky

Youth career
- DAC Dunajská Streda

Senior career*
Years	Team	Apps	(Gls)
- DAC Dunajská Streda
- KOBA Senec
	Púchov	1	(0)
2004–2013	DAC Dunajská Streda	30	(1)
2005	→ FK Trnávka (loan)		
2007–2008	→ SFM Senec (loan)		
2009	→ Gabčíkovo (loan)	2	(0)
2010	→ Galanta (loan)		
2012	→ Družstevník Topoľníky (loan)		
2013–2014	Kaposvár		
2014–2015	Šamorín		
2016–2019	Družstevník Topoľníky		

Managerial career
- 2015: Šamorín (assistant)
- * Club domestic league appearances and goals as of 21 May 2012

Jozef Medgyes (born 31 July 1985) is a Slovak football defender of Hungarian ethnicity who currently plays for TJ Družstevník Michal Ostrove.

== Club career ==
Medgyes started his career in Dunajská Streda. In 2014, he joined FC ŠTK 1914 Šamorín. He originally joined the club as an assistant coach and fitness coach of the U19 team. However, there was a coaching change for the A-team, and Libor Fašiang became the new coach. A year after Medgyes went to the U19 as a fitness coach, he became the club's sports director, assistant coach of the A-team, and also played for the A-team. In 2019 he joined TJ Družstevník Michal Ostrove in the sixth league, later becoming captain of the team.

== Personal life ==
He is the son of Jozef Medgyes, who was also a footballer. He played for Spartak Trnava, RH Cheb and DAC Dunajská Streda. Abroad he played for Wismut Aue and Altay Izmir.
