= Zápotoka =

Zápotoka is a Slovak surname. Notable people with the surname include:

- Ján Zápotoka (born 1988), Slovak footballer
- Lukáš Zápotoka (born 1985), Slovak footballer
- Tomáš Zápotoka (born 1987), Slovak footballer
