= Dezider Egri =

Slovak footballer (born 1992)

Personal information
- Date of birth: 20 June 1992 (age 34)
- Place of birth: Dunajská Streda, Czechoslovakia
- Height: 1.80 m (5 ft 11 in)
- Position: Defender

Team information
- Current team: SC Reisenberg

Youth career
- –2008: ŠK FC Vydrany
- 2008: → Topoľníky (loan)
- 2008: → DAC Dunajská Streda (loan)
- 2008–: Topoľníky

Senior career*
Years	Team	Apps	(Gls)
–2012	Topoľníky		
2012–2014	Vrakúň		
2013–2014	→ ŠK Senec (loan)	12	(0)
2014–2015	DAC Dunajská Streda II		
2016	DAC Dunajská Streda	5	(0)
2018–2020	FC Tomášikovo		
2021–2023	FC Tomášikovo		
2023–2025	SC Reisenberg		
2025–	SC Höflein		
- * Club domestic league appearances and goals as of 30 April 2016

Dezider Egri (born 20 June 1992) is a Slovak football defender who plays for Austrian amateur club SC Höflein. He is ethnic Hungarian. He is most known for playing with DAC Dunajska Streda, a club he spent most of his professional career with.

== Early career ==
Egri was born in Dunajská Streda. At the age of seven, he participated in a training camp in Potônske Lúky, and later joined the academy of FC DAC 1904 Dunajska Streda. He originally played as a central midfielder before being converted into a defender.

== Club career ==
=== DAC Dunajská Streda ===
In the summer of 2014, Egri joined the B-team of FC DAC 1904 Dunajska Streda. He signed his first professional contract with DAC Dunajská Streda in March 2016, signing for one and a half years alongside András Mészáros. He made his professional Fortuna Liga debut for DAC Dunajská Streda against ŠK Slovan Bratislava on 2 April 2016. He became a starter for DAC, playing in the rest of the games in March. Injuries would affect his season. Due to a long-term injury, Egri wouldn’t be included in the club’s 2017 winter preparations.
