= Rengel =

Rengel is a surname of Swiss German or Spanish origin. Notable people with the surname include:

- Juan Jacinto Muñoz Rengel (born 1974), Spanish writer
- Peter Rengel (born 1987), Slovak footballer
- Soleidys Rengel (born 1993), Venezuelan footballer
