= Hrdina =

Hrdina (feminine Hrdinová) is a Czech and Slovak surname (meaning "hero"), it may refer to:

- Adam Hrdina, Slovak footballer
- Eva Hrdinová, Czech tennis player
- Jan Hrdina, Czech ice hockey player
- Jiří Hrdina, Czech ice hockey player
- Miroslav Hrdina, Slovak footballer
