= Peter Rengel =

Slovak footballer

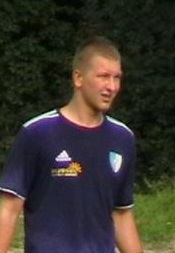

Personal information
- Date of birth: 1 December 1987 (age 38)
- Place of birth: Dunajská Streda, ČSSR
- Height: 1.91 m (6 ft 3 in)
- Position: Goalkeeper

Youth career
- 2002–2004: OFC Gabčíkovo

Senior career*
| Years | Team | Apps | (Gls) |
| 2004–2007 | OFC Gabčíkovo | | |
| 2007 | → FK Baka (loan) | | |
| 2007–2008 | → MŠK Veľký Meder (loan) | | |
| 2009 | TJ Čierny Brod (Loan) | | |
| 2009 | partak Trnava | | |
| 2009 | → Družstevník Topoľníky (loan) | | |
| 2010 | Družstevník Vrakúň | | |
| 2011 | Družstevník Topoľníky | | |
| 2012–2015 | OFC Gabčíkovo | | |
| 2016 | ŠK Senec | 9 | (0) |
| 2016–2017 | ŠK Gabčíkovo | | |
| 2017–2019 | Gyirmót | 1 | (0) |
| 2019–2020 | Győri ETO | 2 | (0) |
- * Club domestic league appearances and goals as of 23:51, 26 December 2019 (UTC)

Peter Rengel (born 1 December 1987) is a Slovak professional footballer.

== Club career ==
=== Győri ETO FC ===
On 2 August 2019 Győri ETO FC announced, that Rengel had joined the club from Gyirmót FC Győr.
