= Gombala =

Gombala is a Slovak surname. Notable people with the surname include:

- Július Gombala (born 1993), Slovak footballer
- Milan Gombala (born 1968), Czech long jumper
