= Juraj Baláž =

Slovak football player

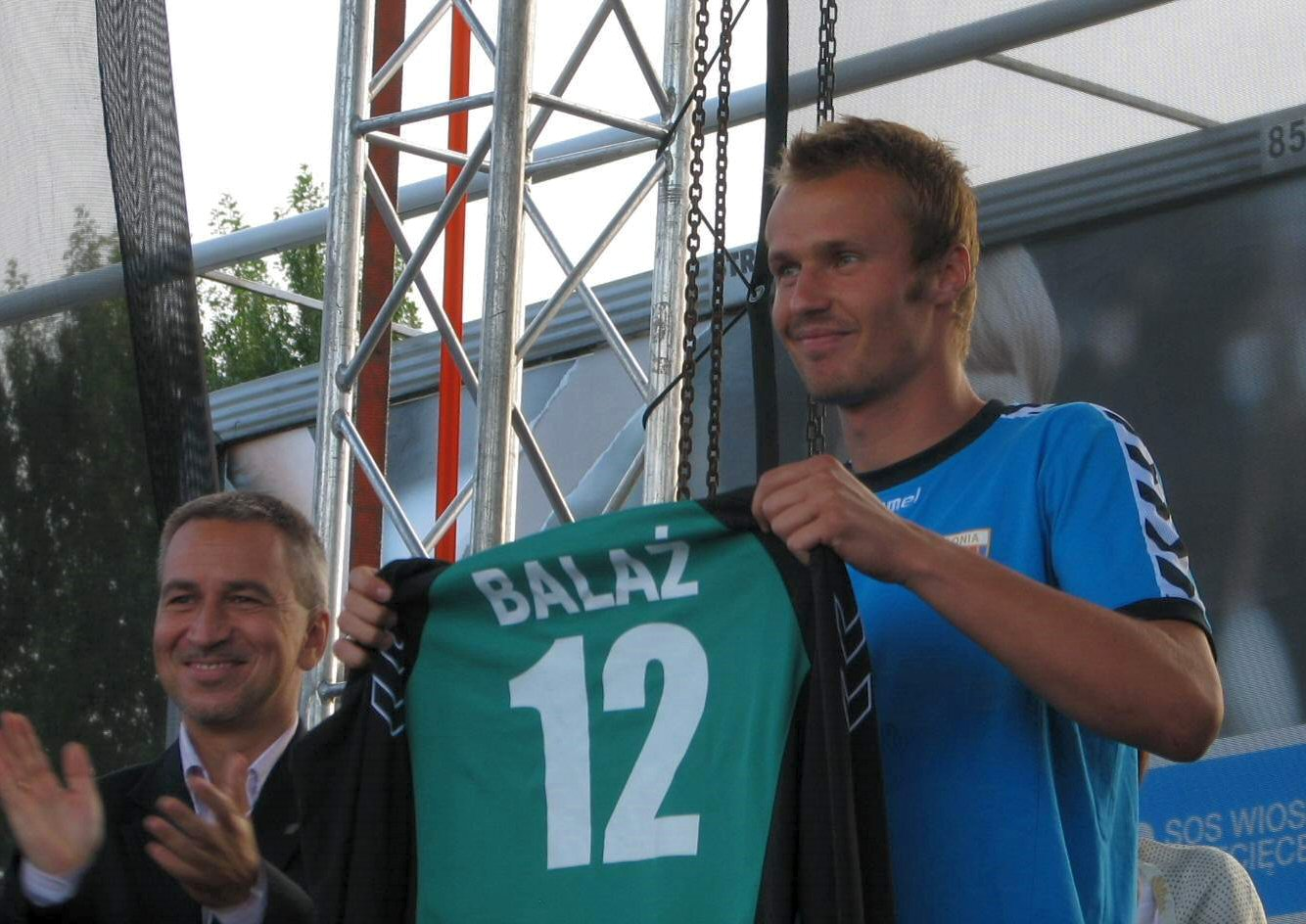
- Juraj Baláž (right) with Piotr Koj (left) in 2009

Personal information
- Full name: Juraj Baláž
- Date of birth: 12 June 1980 (age 46)
- Place of birth: Nitra, Czechoslovakia
- Height: 1.92 m (6 ft 4 in)
- Position: Goalkeeper

Team information
- Current team: ŠTK 1914 Šamorín & Slovakia U18 (goalkeeping coach)

Senior career*
Years	Team	Apps	(Gls)
1997–1998	FC Nitra		
1998–2000	Spartak Trnava	0	(0)
2000–2001	VTJ Koba Senec		
2005–2006	Spartak Trnava	0	(0)
2006–2007	Tatran Prachatice		
2007–2008	Spartak MAS Sezimovo Ústí		
2008–2009	Tatran Prešov	8	(0)
2009–2012	Polonia Bytom	16	(0)
2013–2015	Podbrezová	36	(0)
2016–2017	Neded		
- * Club domestic league appearances and goals

Juraj Baláž (born 12 June 1980) is a Slovak former professional footballer who played as a goalkeeper. He is currently the goalkeeping coach for ŠTK 1914 Šamorín and the Slovakia national under-18 team.

== Career ==
=== Club ===
In July 2009, he joined Polonia Bytom on a three-year contract. He left the club on 7 January 2013.
