= Mike Keeney =

American soccer coach (born 1974)

Personal information
- Date of birth: March 18, 1974 (age 52)
- Place of birth: Antioch, California

Managerial career
- Years: Team
- 2008–2009: HJK Helsinki
- 2008–2010: FC Viikingit
- 2012: Ekenäs IF
- 2013: Papua New Guinea
- 2014–15: MYPA Kouvola
- 2015: Ekenäs SC
- 2016–17: ŠTK Šamorín
- 2017–18: KuFu-98
- 2018–19: Sudet Kouvola
- 2019–: HIFK Helsinki

Mike Keeney (born March 18, 1974) is an American soccer coach who is currently a first team coach of HIFK Fotboll in Helsinki. A native of California, Keeney has previously coached clubs in Finland and Slovakia, and worked with the Oceania Football Confederation. Prior to coaching professionally, Keeney coached collegiate soccer with the University of Kentucky, University of Alabama at Birmingham, University of Louisville, and Bellarmine College.

== Coaching career ==
=== Domestic ===
Mike Keeney started his coaching career at Javanon Soccer Club from Louisville, Kentucky. Keeney spent four years at Javanon, from 1996 to 2000, and during his time there, he coached the team to the State Cup Championship in 1997 and again in 1998. Keeney also finished his USSF B License.

From Javanon Soccer Club, Keeney moved to Bluegrass Soccer Club, to be the director of coaching and player development. During his three-year stint with the club, Keeney directed all the coaching operations of a club with 16 competitive teams, developed and implemented a progressive coaching curriculum for players within the ages of 8 to 18 years old. He was also directly responsible for the coaching staff of 16 team coaches, five age group trainers and two goalkeeper trainers. Keeney would spend a total of three years at the club before moving to Birmingham, Alabama, where he started working with the Hoover Soccer Club. At Hoover, he was named the executive director and director of coaching and player development.

Just like in Javanon, Keeney was responsible of all coaching operations of the club, but this time with 1,200 players (300+ competitive and 900+ recreational). He was also given the responsibility of developing and implementing a progressive coaching curriculum for players age 4 to 18 years old and he was directly responsible for the coaching staff of 12 coaches, 8 age group trainers and 2 goalkeeper trainers for competitive program as well as one-part time club administrator. At Hoover, he also established a direct link with Celtic FC of Glasgow, Scotland for coach and player exchange program. This led to the Celtic FC coaching staff working in the 2006 competitive team camps for Hoover Soccer Club.

After Hoover Soccer Club, Keeney made an appearance at Thoroughbreds Soccer Club, from Louisville as a staff coach, team trainer and as a goalkeeper coach. He also coached and trained several teams in various age groups. Keeney spent a year at Thoroughbreds.

=== Abroad ===
Keeney moved to Finland to join FC Viikingit from Helsinki, Finland. He spent two years at Viikingit, where he was the director of coaching and player development for academy teams (11 a side teams) During his time at Viikingit, he developed the club academy format and coaching structure, trained various teams within the club, was in charge of the day-to-day operations of the club and as the head coach of the U20 boys Academy team, achieved promotion to ASM (Top Youth League for the country, with only 10 teams) which was the first time in the club's 45-year history. He also worked with the first team, and during the 2009 helped his team to a 3rd-place finish in Ykkönen (1st division) and again in 2010 he helped his team to finish 2nd in Ykkönen. At Viikingit, Keeney also got his UEFA B License.

His work at Viikingit caught the eye of the Veikkausliiga side MYPA, where he moved in 2009. At MYPA he was the men's first team's assistant coach from 2009 to 2011. During his time at MYPA he got valuable experience of coaching in the Veikkausliiga, and in the UEFA Europa League.

In 2013, he coached the Papua New Guinea national soccer team.

Since 2014 he was coach of the Finnish MYPA. Since 2016 he is coach of Slovak FC Šamorín

== Honors ==
FC Šamorín

- 3. Liga: 2015–16 (promoted)
