= Csaba Horváth (footballer) =

Slovak footballer (born 1982)

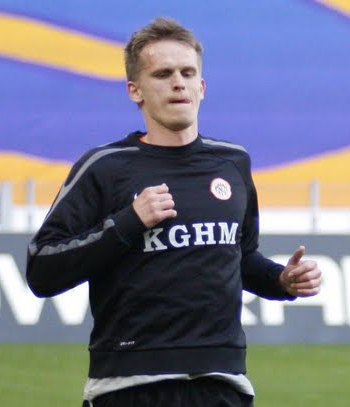
- Horváth in 2013

Personal information
- Date of birth: 2 May 1982 (age 44)
- Place of birth: Dunajská Streda, Czechoslovakia
- Height: 1.90 m (6 ft 3 in)
- Position: Centre-back

Youth career
- Šamorín
- 1999–2000: ŠKP Devín

Senior career*
Years	Team	Apps	(Gls)
2000–2002	ŠKP Devín		
2002–2004	Synot Staré Město	7	(0)
2004–2009	AS Trenčín	107	(11)
2005–2006	→ Slovácko (loan)	0	(0)
2008–2010	→ ADO Den Haag (loan)	48	(6)
2010–2013	Zagłębie Lubin	48	(0)
2013–2015	Piast Gliwice	59	(5)
2016–2018	ŠTK 1914 Šamorín	47	(3)

International career
2009	Slovakia	1	(0)
- * Club domestic league appearances and goals

Csaba Horváth (Slovak pronunciation: [ˈtʂaba ˈɦɔrʋaːt]; born 2 May 1982) is a Slovak former professional footballer who played as a centre-back. Across his club career, Horváth played in the Czech Republic, the Netherlands and Poland, as well as his native Slovakia. He made one appearance for Slovakia in 2009.

He currently serves as the president of his former club ŠTK 1914 Šamorín.

== Club career ==
He signed on loan for ADO Den Haag in July 2008 for the 2008–09 season, with an option for Den Haag to buy after the season. He scored in his debut match, a 5–2 win against Sparta Rotterdam. After his first season with Den Haag, the club wanted to keep the player but complained that his transfer fee was too high, so Horváth remained at the club on loan. In his second season with Den Haag, Horváth scored in an away win against Vitesse Arnhem.

On 4 July 2010 he moved to Polish club Zagłębie Lubin, where he signed a three-year contract. In three seasons with the club, Horváth made 48 Ekstraklasa appearances for Zagłębie without scoring. In June 2013, Horváth signed a two-year contract with another Polish side, Piast Gliwice, as a free agent. After five years in Poland, Horváth returned to Slovakia. He concluded his professional career in January 2018.

== International career ==
In August 2009, Horváth was called up to the Slovakia national team, his second such call-up. He made his international debut in a 1–1 friendly draw against Iceland on 12 August. Later the same month he was nominated in the Slovakia squad for World Cup qualification matches against the Czech Republic and Northern Ireland.
