= Balázs Borbély =

Slovak football player and manager (born 1979)

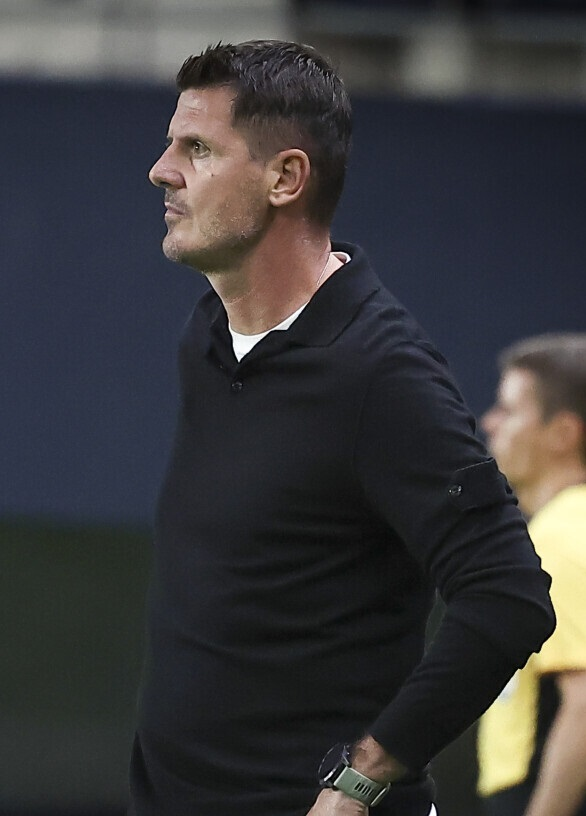
- Borbély managing Győr in 2025

Personal information
- Date of birth: 2 October 1979 (age 47)
- Place of birth: Dunajská Streda, Czechoslovakia
- Height: 1.82 m (6 ft 0 in)
- Position: Defensive midfielder

Team information
- Current team: Ferencváros (manager)

Youth career
- Dunajská Streda

Senior career*
Years	Team	Apps	(Gls)
1998–2000	Dunajská Streda	28	(0)
2000–2005	Artmedia Petržalka	165	(12)
2006–2007	1. FC Kaiserslautern	21	(1)
2007	Artmedia Petržalka	14	(0)
2008–2010	Politehnica Timişoara	42	(2)
2010–2012	AEL Limassol	12	(0)
2012	→ FC ŠTK 1914 Šamorín (loan)	13	(1)
2013–2014	TJ Družstevník Vrakúň		

International career
2004–2009	Slovakia	15	(0)

Managerial career
- 2014–2015: Dunajská Streda U19 (assistant)
- 2014–2024: TJ Družstevník Vrakúň
- 2016: Dunajská Streda (assistant)
- 2017–2019: FC Petržalka
- 2019–2022: Ferencvaros U17-19
- 2022–2024: Dunajská Streda (assistant)
- 2024–2026: Győr
- 2026–: Ferencváros
Medal record
Politehnica Timişoara
Runner-up	Liga I	2009
Runner-up	Romanian Cup	2009
- * Club domestic league appearances and goals as of 28 March 2013

Balázs Borbély (born 2 October 1979) is a professional football manager and former player who is the manager of Nemzeti Bajnokság I club Ferencváros. His former clubs were TJ Družstevník Vrakúň, FC ŠTK 1914 Šamorín and AEL Limassol. At international level, he represented Slovakia.

== Club career ==
An ethnic Hungarian, Borbély was born in Czechoslovakia and began playing football for his home town club FK DAC 1904 Dunajská Streda until joining Artmedia Petržalka, the club where he would enjoy his greatest success. He captained the Artmedia Petržalka side which reached the group stages of the 2005–06 UEFA Champions League. Following this success, he moved to German Bundesliga side 1. FC Kaiserslautern, where he would spend one and a half seasons. He struggled through injury in his tenure at Kaiserslautern and returned to Artmedia Petržalka in the summer of 2007.

He moved abroad again when Romanian club FC Timişoara acquired Borbély to help strengthen their defensive midfield in January 2008. He would help Timișoara reach the play-off round of the 2009–10 UEFA Champions League where the club fell to German side VfB Stuttgart.

== International career ==
Borbély made 15 appearances for the Slovakia national team, including playing in the UEFA Euro 2008 qualification rounds.

== Coaching career ==
In the 2016–17 season Borbély coached the B-team of Dunajská Streda. He was announced as the new head coach of FC Petržalka ahead of the 2017–18 season, for which the club played in the 3. Liga.

=== Győr ===
On 24 April 2024, Borbély was appointed head coach of Hungarian Nemzeti Bajnokság II side Győr, five matches before the end of the 2023–24 season. On 26 May 2024, Győr were promoted to the first division.

=== Ferencváros ===
On 1 June 2026, he was appointed as the coach of Ferencváros replacing Robbie Keane.

Borbély debuted with a 2–1 victory over FK Vojvodina in the first round of the 2026–27 UEFA Europa League qualifying at the Karađorđe Stadium in Novi Sad. In the second tie, Ferencváros beat Vojvodina 3–0 at the Groupama Aréna on 16 July 2026. On 17 August 2026, Borbély won his first Nemzeti Bajnokság I match with Ferencváros by beating Zalaegerszegi TE away 1–0 in the 2026–27 Nemzeti Bajnokság I season.

== Honours ==
Borbély after winning the 2025–26 Nemzeti Bajnokság I with Győr

=== Player ===
Artmedia Petržalka

- Slovak First Football League: 2004–05, 2007–08
- Slovak Cup: 2003–04, 2007–08
- Slovak Super Cup: 2005

=== Manager ===
MFK Petržalka

- 3. Liga: Winners 2017–18

Győr

- Nemzeti Bajnokság I: 2025–26

Individual

- Nemzeti Bajnokság I Manager of the Month: February 2025
