= Jakub Kastelovič =

Slovak footballer

Personal information
- Full name: Jakub Kastelovič
- Date of birth: 14 June 1995 (age 31)
- Place of birth: Slovakia
- Height: 1.85 m (6 ft 1 in)
- Positions: Defender; midfielder

Team information
- Current team: SK Dolne Vestenice

Youth career
- 2000–2002: OFK Solčany
- 2002–2007: Topoľčany
- 2008–2012: FC Nitra
- 2012–2013: Liberec

Senior career*
Years	Team	Apps	(Gls)
2013–2014	Liberec U-21		
2014–2015	Myjava	8	(0)
2015–2016	Šaľa	30	(3)
2016–2017	Zlaté Moravce - Vráble	2	(0)
2017	→ Horses Šúrovce (loan)	?	(?)
2017–	SK Dolne Vestenice	?	(?)

International career
2012–2013	Slovakia U18	12	(0)
2013–2014	Slovakia U19	9	(0)
- * Club domestic league appearances and goals as of 9 November 2017

Jakub Kastelovič (born 14 June 1995) is a Slovak football midfielder who plays for SK Dolne Vestenice. He is a former international youth representative, playing for the Slovak under-18 and 19’s.

== Early life ==
Kastelovič was born in the town of Topoľčany, where he first started playing football.

== Club career ==
Kastelovič began his football career at OFK Solčany, from where he moved to MFK Topvar Topoľčany during his youth career, and then to FC Nitra. In 2012, he became a reinforcement for the Czech team FC Slovan Liberec. He did not make it to the A-team. He played only for the junior. On 14 August 2014, he signed a contract with Spartak Myjava. He made his professional debut for Spartak Myjava against ŠK Slovan Bratislava on 23 August 2014. After a year, he transferred to FK Slovan Duslo Šaľa. Following injuries, Kastelovič would reset his career in the seventh league.

== International career ==
In April 2023, Kastelovič was nominated to be a part of the Slovakia national under-18 football team for the Slovakia Cup youth tournament. He would be the only player nominated who played for a foreign club.
