= Peter Leško =

Former Slovak footballer

Personal information
- Full name: Peter Leško
- Date of birth: 23 September 1991 (age 35)
- Place of birth: Czechoslovakia
- Position: Left back

Youth career
- –2011: Tatran Prešov

Senior career*
Years	Team	Apps	(Gls)
????–2011	Tatran Prešov B		
2012–2017	Tatran Prešov	?	(?)
2014	→ Rozvoj Pušovce (loan)	6	(0)
2015	→ Haniska (loan)	17	(0)
2016	→ Pohronie (loan)	6	(1)
2018–2019	FK Slovan Kendice	8	(3)
- * Club domestic league appearances and goals as of 17 August 2020

Peter Leško (born 23 September 1991) is a former Slovak football defender.

== 1. FC Tatran Prešov ==
Leško made his official debut for Tatran Prešov on 20 May 2012, playing full-time in a 2–1 home win against Slovan Bratislava.
