= Andrej Pernecký =

Slovak footballer (born 1991)

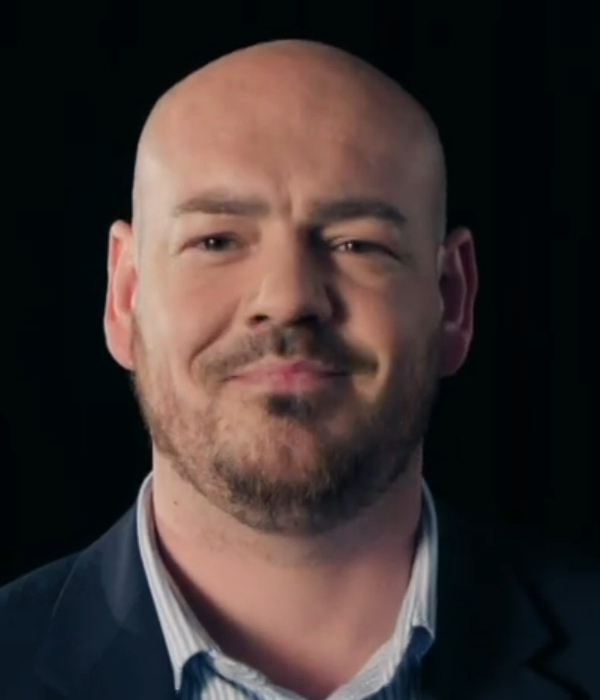

Personal information
- Full name: Andrej Pernecký
- Date of birth: 16 March 1991 (age 35)
- Place of birth: Bratislava, Czechoslovakia
- Height: 1.91 m (6 ft 3 in)
- Position: Goalkeeper

Youth career
- –2007: Inter Bratislava
- 2007–2010: Southampton

Senior career*
Years	Team	Apps	(Gls)
2009	→ Bognor Regis Town (loan)	14	(0)
2010–2011	AEL Limassol		
2011	ŠKP Dúbravka		
2011–2012	Sereď		
2012–2013	Žižkov	1	(0)
2013–2016	Dunajská Streda	9	(0)
2015	VSS Košice (loan)	5	(0)
2016–2017	SV Prellenkirchen		

International career
2009–2010	Slovakia U19	3	(0)
- * Club domestic league appearances and goals

Andrej Pernecký (born 16 March 1991) was a Slovak football goalkeeper who is most known for his time with Corgoň Liga club FK DAC 1904 Dunajská Streda.

== Early life ==
Pernecký was born on March 16, 1991 in Bratislava, where he would later play for the local club FC Ružinov Bratislava before joining FK Inter Bratislava.

== Club career ==
=== Early career ===
After coming through Inter Bratislava academy, Pernecký joined the Southampton academy at the age of fifteen. In 2010, Pernecký joined Cypriot First Division club AEL Limassol. He later left the club after half a year due to a knee injury. The surgeon on his knee went very badly. The ligament did not heal, and recovery after the second procedure took almost a year. At the beginning of the 2011–2012 season, he signed a one-year contract with the third-league Slovak club ŠKF Sereď. After his contract in Sered expired, he received an offer from the Czech second-league club FK Viktoria Žižkov, where he signed a contract until the end of the 2012–2013 season. Pernecký would only play for the club’s reserve team at his time there.

=== Dunajská Streda ===
Before the following season, he returned to Slovakia and signed a contract with FK DAC Dunajská Streda. During twenty rounds of the Corgoň league, he only started in three, conceding 2 goals in them. In the 2015 Slovak Cup semi-finals against FK Senica, Pernecký played 20 minutes of the game following the sending off of Martin Polaček. In the penalty shootout, he saved shots by Hlohovský and Hušek, but it would not be enough to advance to the next stage.
