= Miroslav Hrdina =

Slovak footballer

Personal information
- Full name: Miroslav Hrdina
- Date of birth: 23 September 1976 (age 50)
- Place of birth: Nitra, Czechoslovakia
- Height: 1.86 m (6 ft 1 in)
- Position: Goalkeeper

Youth career
- Nitra

Senior career*
Years	Team	Apps	(Gls)
1993–1997	Nitra	46	(0)
1998–1999	Prievidza	4	(0)
1999–2000	ŠKP		
2000–2001	Prostějov	15	(0)
2001–2004	HFK Olomouc	51	(0)
2004	Selangor FA		
2005–2010	Spartak Trnava	25	(0)
2008	→ Michalovce (loan)	14	(0)
2011–2012	Neded		
2013–2016	Sereď		

Managerial career
- 2011–2012: Neded
- 2020–2024: Slovan Bratislava (GK coach)
- * Club domestic league appearances and goals

Miroslav Hrdina (born 23 September 1976) is a former Slovak football goalkeeper and coach.
