= TJ Družstevník Vrakúň =

Slovak football club

TJ Družstevník Vrakúň (FC DAC 1904 Dunajská Streda B)
- Full name: TJ Družstevník Vrakúň (FC DAC 1904 Dunajská Streda B)
- Founded: TBA
- Ground: Stadium TJ Družstevník Vrakúň, Vrakúň, Slovakia
- Manager: Balázs Borbély
- League: IV. lig JV, (South-East)

TJ Družstevník Vrakúň or also FC DAC 1904 Dunajská Streda B is a Slovak association football club located in Vrakúň. It currently plays in Slovak IV. liga south-east. In Summer 2014 was renamed to FC DAC 1904 Dunajská Streda B and it became reserve team of FC DAC 1904 Dunajská Streda

== Colors and badge ==
Its colors are TBA.
