= Vrakúň =

Vrakúň Nyékvárkony
- Municipality
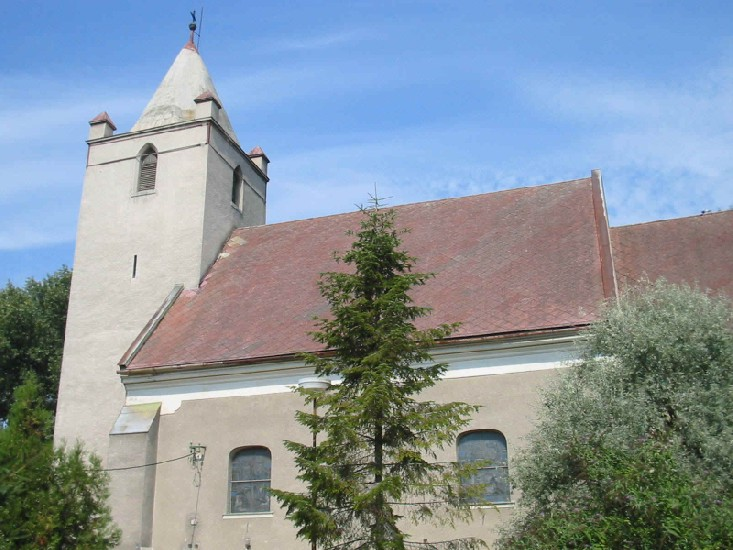

- Flag

- Location of Vrakúň in the Trnava Region Location of Vrakúň in Slovakia
- Coordinates: 47.93°N 17.60°E
- Country: Slovakia
- Region: Trnava Region
- District: Dunajská Streda District
- First mentioned: 1260

Government
  - Mayor: Štefan Fazekas (Ind.)

Area
  - Total: 38.33 km^{2} (14.80 sq mi)
- Elevation: 114 m (374 ft)

Population (2025)
  - Total: 2,958

Ethnicity
  - Hungarians: 92,67%
  - Slovaks: 7,09%
- Time zone: UTC+1 (CET)
  - Summer (DST): UTC+2 (CEST)
- Postal code: 930 25
- Area code: +421 31
- Vehicle registration plate (until 2022): DS
- Website: www.vrakun.sk

Vrakúň (Hungarian: Nyékvárkony, pronounced [ˈɲeːkvaːrkoɲ]) is a village and municipality in the Dunajská Streda District in the Trnava Region of south-west Slovakia.

== Etymology ==
According to professor Šimon Ondruš (1990), Vrakúň is of Slavic origin, from Proto-Slavic vorkъ (in East Slavic languages: vorok - a fence, a barrier), but documented only for the East Slavs.

== History ==
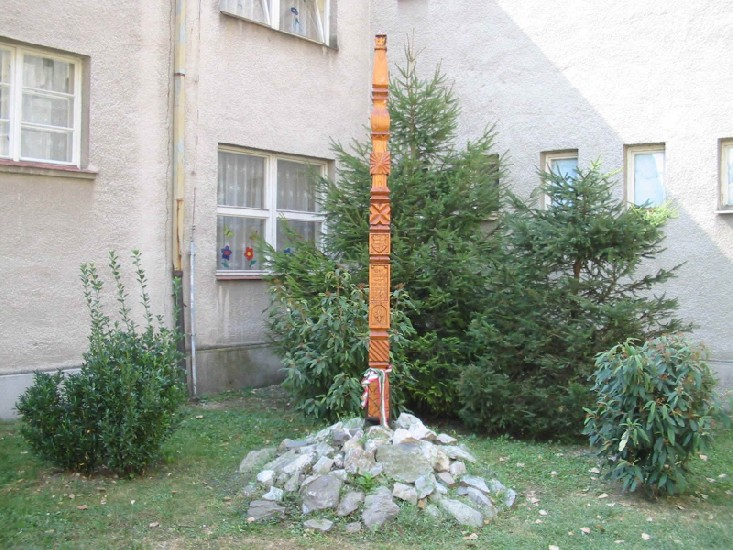
"Kopjafa" - Memorial of the Hungarian Revolution of 1848/49

The present-day municipality was formed in 1940 being when Várkony (Vrakúň) and Csallóköznyék (Nekyje na Ostrove) villages were unified under the name of Nyékvárkony by the Hungarian authorities.

Vrakúň (Várkony) is an ancient settlement, it existed already in the Avar age and its name is connected to the Oiarchunítani name. The village was first recorded in 1015. It was the age-old estate of the Amadé Family. Nyék was first recorded in 1165, it had first been the tribal territory of the Nyék tribe, later the village belonged to the Pozsony Castle. King Stephen III of Hungary granted nobility for the inhabitants of the village. In 1245, the village was donated to Neku son of Nech and his brother Peter son of Chueg by a charter of King Béla IV of Hungary in which the village is mentioned as Neeku. Until the end of World War I, both component villages were part of Hungary and fell within the Dunaszerdahely district of Pozsony County. After the Austro-Hungarian army disintegrated in November 1918, Czechoslovak troops occupied the area. After the Treaty of Trianon of 1920, the villages became officially part of Czechoslovakia. In November 1938, the First Vienna Award granted the area to Hungary and it was held by Hungary until 1945. After Soviet occupation in 1945, Czechoslovak administration returned and the village became officially part of Czechoslovakia in 1947.

== Population ==
Population statistic (10 years)
Year	1995	2005	2015	2025
Count	2456	2505	2634	2958
Difference		+1.99%	+5.14%	+12.30%

Population statistic
Year	2024	2025
Count	2946	2958
Difference		+0.40%

It has a population of 2958 people (31 December 2025).

=== Ethnicity ===
Census 2021 (1+ %)
Ethnicity	Number	Fraction
Hungarian	2286	81.81%
Slovak	481	17.21%
Not found out	136	4.86%
Total	2794	

In year 2021 was 2794 people by ethnicity 2286 as Hungarian, 481 as Slovak, 136 as Not found out, 26 as Romani, 11 as Iranian, 11 as Other, 7 as Czech, 6 as German, 4 as Ukrainian, 3 as Rusyn, 3 as Russian, 1 as Vietnamese, 1 as Italian and 1 as Romanian.

Note on population: The difference values of population numbers in the table "Population statistic" and in the sections "Ethnicity" & "Religion" is caused by the use of various statistical methods.

=== Religion ===
Census 2021 (1+ %)
Religion	Number	Fraction
Roman Catholic Church	2055	73.55%
None	443	15.86%
Not found out	104	3.72%
Calvinist Church	75	2.68%
Evangelical Church	31	1.11%
Greek Catholic Church	28	1%
Total	2794	

In year 2021 was 2794 people by religion 2055 from Roman Catholic Church, 443 from None, 104 from Not found out, 75 from Calvinist Church, 31 from Evangelical Church, 28 from Greek Catholic Church, 20 from Christian Congregations in Slovakia, 11 from Other and not ascertained christian church, 5 from Eastern Orthodox Church, 5 from Hinduism, 4 from Paganism and natural spirituality, 4 from Islam, 3 from Buddhism, 2 from Jehovah's Witnesses, 2 from Other, 1 from Old Catholic Church and 1 from United Methodist Church.

In 1910, Csallóköznyék had had 643, while Várkony had 866, for the most part, Hungarian inhabitants. At the 2001 Census the recorded population of the village was 2537 while an end-2008 estimate by the Statistical Office had the villages's population also as 2588. As of 2001, 92.67 per cent of its population was Hungarian while 7.09 per cent was Slovak.

Roman Catholicism is the majority religion of the village, its adherents numbering 93.61% of the total population.

== Geography ==
The municipality lies at an altitude of 114 metres (374 ft) and covers an area of 38.33 km^{2} (14.80 sq mi) (2025).
