= Slavomír Kica =

Slovak footballer

Personal information
- Full name: Slavomír Kica
- Date of birth: 13 October 1984 (age 42)
- Place of birth: Czechoslovakia
- Position: Left back

Team information
- Current team: FK Gerlachov

Youth career
- 2000–2005: Bardejov

Senior career*
Years	Team	Apps	(Gls)
2005–2010	SC Rabenstein	67	(10)
2010–2011	Tatran Prešov	8	(0)
2011	→ Partizán Bardejov (loan)	13	(0)
2011–2015	Partizán Bardejov	107	(4)
2016–2018	Poprad	73	(1)
2019–	Partizán Bardejov	21	(0)
2020–	→ FK Gerlachov (loan)		
- * Club domestic league appearances and goals as of 8 January 2020

Slavomír Kica (born 13 October 1984) is a Slovak football defender who currently plays for FK Gerlachov.
