= Niaré Benogo =

Malian footballer (born 1992)

Personal information
- Full name: Niaré Benogo
- Date of birth: 27 August 1992 (age 34)
- Place of birth: Mali
- Position: Midfielder

Senior career*
Years	Team	Apps	(Gls)
2012–2013	Korhogo	10	(2)
2013–2016	Inter Allies	21+	(3+)
2015	→ Spartak Trnava (loan)	6	(0)
- * Club domestic league appearances and goals

Niaré Benogo (born 27 August 1992) is a Malian former footballer who predominantly played as a midfielder.

Benogo played for African clubs CO Korhogo and Inter Allies before joining Slovak club FC Spartak Trnava on a loan. After making only 6 appearances, his contract with the club would be terminated by mutual consent.

== Club career ==
=== Early career ===
Benogo played football in Ivory Coast for Club Omnisports de Korhogo, then moved to Ghana, where he played in the Ghana Premier League for International Allies FC from the 2013–14 season. Benogo scored the winning goal for Inter Allies in a 1–0 win against Aduana Stars, which would help the club retain the league title with a game left. He would become an first-team player after his positive performances, playing in 21 matches for the club, where he would score 3 goals.

=== Loan to Spartak Trnava ===
In 2015, Benogo joined Slovak club FC Spartak Trnava on a loan deal with an option of a two-year contract. The club decided to sign him after the player's agent Juraj Vengloš, brought him to the club's attention. Benogo would start training with the A-team, and following good performances, would stay at the club after impressing main coach Ivan Hucko.

He made his professional debut for Spartak Trnava against AS Trenčín on 13 September 2015. Coming on off the bench in the 63rd minute for Aldo Baéz, Benogo would be involved in the second goal scored by David Depetris. The match ended in a 5–3 loss. His first start came a few weeks later, playing 68 minutes of a 2–0 win against DAC Dunajska Streda. In the following match he played the full 90 minutes in a 2–1 victory over MFK Ružomberok. After a total of six matches played, Benogo and the club would agree to terminate his contract. He left the club together with 5 other players.
