= Erik Liener =

Slovak footballer (born 1994)

Personal information
- Full name: Erik Liener
- Date of birth: 2 October 1994 (age 32)
- Place of birth: Prievidza, Slovakia
- Height: 1.84 m (6 ft 0 in)
- Position: Attacking midfielder

Youth career
- –2009: Prievidza
- 2009–2011: Dubnica

Senior career*
| Years | Team | Apps | (Gls) |
| 2012–2013 | Dubnica | 28 | (3) |
| 2014 | Znojmo | 1 | (0) |
| 2014 | Ružomberok | 6 | (0) |
| 2015 | Lokomotíva Zvolen | 28 | (9) |
| 2016 | Iskra Borčice | 4 | (0) |
| 2016–2017 | Vlašim | 5 | (0) |
| 2017 | → Zápy (loan) | 16 | (5) |
| 2017–2018 | Olympia Radotín | 21 | (2) |
| 2018–2019 | Baník Sokolov | 20 | (5) |
| 2019–2024 | Košice | 99 | (17) |
| 2024 | → Petržalka (loan) | 9 | (0) |
- * Club domestic league appearances and goals as of 21 July 2024

Erik Liener (born 2 October 1994) is a Slovak professional footballer who plays as a midfielder.

Liener has also represented the Slovakia national under-18 football team. He won his first trophy in 2023 while playing with Košice, managing to help the club secure promotion after winning the 2. Liga.

== Club career ==
=== Early career ===
Liener started off his career at Prievidza. Afterwards he was transferred to Dubnica. He played 28 games with 1 goal for Dubnica. He joined Znojmo from Dubnica at the beginning of the year 2014. Liener made his debut in the Czech league in a draw against FC Vysočina Jihlava, playing the last 8 minutes.

=== Ružomberok ===
On 30 July 2014, it was announced that Liener would be returning to Slovakia to join first division club MFK Ružomberok. He made his debut for Ružomberok in a 1–1 draw against AS Trenčín, playing the first half. Liener would not be included in Ružomberok’s winter break preparations in Turkey, and instead would be allowed to look for a club to join on loan. He would leave the club after his contract would be terminated.

=== FC Košice ===
In 2019, Liener joined 2. Liga club FC Košice alongside several other players. He helped the club win the league and advance to the First Football League after eight years. Liener made his top-flight debut for Košice in a 1–0 win against FC ViOn Zlaté Moravce, coming on off the bench as a substitute for Lukáš Greššák in the 81st minute. He got his first start in a 3–0 loss against FC Spartak Trnava, playing 61 minutes. Liener would play a total of 14 games for Košice in the first league.

== International career ==
While playing for Dubnica in 2012, Liener would be nominated for the Slovakia national under-18 football team for preparation matches played in Slovakia. A few months later, he would be nominated again as a back-up, this time for friendly matches against Portugal.

== Honours ==
=== FC Košice ===
- 2022–23 2. Liga: Winners
