= FC Neded =

Slovak football club

- Full name: Football Club Neded
- Ground: Stadium FC Neded, Neded, Slovakia
- Chairman: Marian Felix
- Manager: Milos Lipovsky
- League: 4. Liga JV ZsFZ
- 2019–20: 4. Liga JV ZsFZ, 5th
Home colours	Away colours

FC Neded are a semi-professional football club based in the village of Neded, Slovakia. They play their home matches at the Stadium FC Neded. The club competes in 4. Liga, the fourth tier of the Slovak league system.

== First team squad ==
Updated 1 January 2021 Note: Flags indicate national team as defined under FIFA eligibility rules; some limited exceptions apply. Players may hold more than one non-FIFA nationality.

No.	Pos.	Nation	Player
—	GK	SVK	Ladislav Bugár
—	GK	SVK	Branko Turanovič
—	GK	SVK	Štefan Šivaninec
—	DF	SVK	Matúš Pevala
—	DF	SVK	Matúš Turňa
—	DF	SVK	Stanislav Glofák
—	DF	SVK	Peter Peciar
—	DF	SVK	Štefan Ambrus
—	DF	SVK	Andrej Práznovský
—	DF	SVK	Ladislav Patasi

No.	Pos.	Nation	Player
—	MF	SVK	Tibor Kovács
—	MF	SVK	Denis Galbavý
—	MF	SVK	Tomáš Szöcs
—	MF	SVK	Martin Antl
—	MF	SVK	Martin Bocian
—	MF	SVK	Patrik Karvai
—	MF	MKD	Ali Ameti
—	MF	SVK	Dominik Farkas
—	FW	SVK	Erik Moťovský
—	FW	SVK	Stanislav Jašík

== Current technical staff ==
Updated 1 January 2021

Staff	Job title
(Slovakia) Miloš Lipovský	Manager
(Slovakia) Adolf Veszprémi	Team Leader
(Slovakia) Mária Pintérová	Masseur

== Managers ==
Information correct as of matches played 1 January 2021. Only competitive matches are included.

Name	From	To	Tenure	P	W	D	L	GF	GA	Win%	Honours
(Slovakia) Jozef Mrllák		1 October 2002	127 days	11	4	1	6	27	30	39.3	
(Slovakia) František Csöbönyei	1 October 2002	27 May 2003	238 days	21	3	7	11	19	45	25.3	
(Slovakia) Jozef Mrllák	27 May 2003	1 June 2004	1 year, 5 days	34	5	6	23	29	92	20.5	
(Slovakia) Ladislav Kečkéš	1 June 2004	30 June 2005	1 year, 29 days	30	14	5	11	53	44	52.2	
(Slovakia) Karol Karlík	1 July 2005	18 April 2006	291 days	17	9	3	5	38	20	58.8	
(Slovakia) Ladislav Kečkéš	18 April 2006	1 July 2007	1 year, 74 days	41	17	5	19	63	72	45.5	
(Slovakia) Miroslav Lauko	1 July 2007	5 September 2007	66 days	4	0	0	4	4	12	0	
(Slovakia) Vladimír Ekhardt	5 September 2007	15 January 2008	132 days	11	8	2	1	22	5	85.8	
(Slovakia) Andrej Filip	15 January 2008	1 July 2009	1 year, 167 days	46	21	7	18	82	57	50.7	
(Slovakia) Martin Kobora	1 July 2009	1 July 2010	1 year, 0 days	30	11	4	15	40	55	41.1	
(Slovakia) Andrej Filip	1 July 2010	1 February 2011	215 days	15	8	1	6	35	24	55.5	
(Slovakia) Miroslav Hrdina	1 February 2011	15 September 2012	2 years, 227 days	51	28	11	12	99	66	62.0	
(Slovakia) Libor Fašiang	15 September 2012	1 January 2013	108 days	8	1	1	6	8	13	16.6	
(Slovakia) Daniel Benkovský	1 January 2013	1 July 2014	1 year, 181 days	44	20	8	16	91	46	51.5	
(Slovakia) Andrej Filip	1 July 2014	20 August 2015	1 year, 50 days	36	15	10	11	44	42	59.4	
(Slovakia) Vladimír Ekhardt	20 August 2015	26 April 2016	250 days	20	2	8	10	22	41	23.3	
(Slovakia) Jozef Kováč	26 April 2016	12 September 2016	139 days	15	6	2	8	23	30	44.4	
(Slovakia) Tomáš Bartoš	12 September 2016	28 May 2017	258 days	27	4	4	19	28	69	19.7	
(Slovakia) Imrich Csillag	20 August 2017	1 January 2019	8 years, 201 days	41	16	9	16	59	57	46.3	
(Slovakia) Miloš Lipovský	25 January 2019	30 May 2019	7 years, 43 days	39	15	7	17	69	77	33.3	

== League history ==
Slovak League only (1993–present)

Season	Division (Name)	Pos./Teams	Pl.	W	D	L	GS	GA	P	Slovak Cup	Top Scorer (Goals)
1993–94	6th (regional league)	7/(16)	30	14	5	11	53	42	33	Did not enter	
1994–95	6th (regional league)	12/(16)	30	10	6	14	52	59	36	Did not enter	
1995–96	6th (regional league)	4/(16)	30	15	8	7	61	40	50	Did not enter	
1996–97	6th (regional league)	3/(13)	25	15	4	6	46	34	49	Did not enter	
1997–98	5th (regional league)	11/(16)	30	13	2	15	58	60	41	Did not enter	
1998–99	5th (regional league)	3/(16)	30	16	5	9	78	43	53	Did not enter	
1999–00	5th (regional league)	1/(16)	30	20	2	8	101	43	62	Did not enter	
2000–01	4th (regional league)	1/(16)	30	20	4	6	72	41	64	Did not enter	
2001–02	3rd (third league - west)	12/(16)	30	12	1	17	53	56	37	Did not enter	
2002–03	3rd (third league - west)	14/(16)	30	5	9	16	26	60	24	Did not enter	(Slovakia) Peter Sládeček (7)
2003–04	3rd (third league - west)	16/(16)	30	3	5	22	22	87	14	Did not enter	(Slovakia) Ivan Jedinák (5)
2004–05	4th (regional league)	5/(16)	30	14	5	11	53	44	47	Did not enter	(Slovakia) Ladislav Beneš (12)
2005–06	4th (regional league)	4/(15)	28	16	6	6	67	32	54	Did not enter	(Slovakia) Ladislav Beneš (17)
2006–07	4th (regional league)	15/(16)	30	10	2	18	33	60	32	Did not enter	(Slovakia) Slavomír Konc (17)
2007–08	4th (regional league)	4/(16)	30	14	6	10	46	30	48	Did not enter	(Slovakia) Adrián Paštiak (13)
2008–09	4th (regional league)	8/(16)	30	14	3	13	61	44	45	Did not enter	(Slovakia) Vladimír Rožník (18)
2009–10	4th (regional league)	15/(16)	30	11	4	15	40	55	37	Did not enter	(Slovakia) Emil Ivanič (10)
2010–11	5th (regional league)	3/(16)	28	17	6	7	73	35	57	Did not enter	(Slovakia) Adam Bombicz (13)
2011–12	5th (regional league)	2/(16)	30	19	4	7	56	40	61	Did not enter	(Slovakia) Lajos Kalmár, Adam Polednák (8)
2012–13	4th (regional league)	15/(16)	28	6	3	19	37	42	21	Did not enter	(Slovakia) Dušan Krcho (6)
2013–14	4th (regional league)	5/(16)	30	15	8	7	67	30	53	Did not enter	(Slovakia) Šimon Valachovič (13)
2014–15	3rd (third league - West - South West)	4/(18)	32	15	10	7	40	32	55	Did not enter	(Slovakia) Šimon Valachovič (14)
2015–16	3rd (third league - West - South West)	16/(18)	32	6	9	17	40	62	27	2.R, 2–6 (FC Slovan Galanta)	(Slovakia) Šimon Valachovič (7)
2016–17	3rd (third league - West - South West)	19/(19)	36	6	6	24	38	85	24	Did not enter	(Cameroon) Obassi Fritz Ambassa (10)
2017–18	4th (regional league)	9/(16)	30	11	5	14	46	46	38	Did not enter	(Slovakia) Tomas Kunovsky (10)
2018–19	4th (regional league)	8/(16)	26	9	7	10	30	35	34	Did not enter	(Slovakia) Denis Galbavy (5)
2019–20	4th (regional league)	5/(16)	16	8	3	5	34	26	27	Did not enter	(Slovakia) Martin Bocian (10)
2020–21	4th (regional league)	11/(16)	15	5	1	9	30	47	16	Did not enter	(Slovakia) Stanislav Jašík (7)
2021–22	4th (regional league)	16/(19)	30	9	4	17	40	81	31	Did not enter	(Slovakia) Ladislav Pataši (8)
2022–23	5th (regional league)	/(16)								Did not enter	(Slovakia) ()

== Records and statistics ==
- Record league win: 11–0 (against TJ Mýtna Nová Ves, 8. Juny 1999).
- Record league defeat: 0–10 (against ŠK LR Crystal Lednické Rovne, 31. May 2004).
- Record home League attendance: 1500 (against TJ Družstevník Topoľníky, won 3–1, 26. August 2009).
- Most league goals in one season: Vladimír Rožník, 18 (during the 2008-2009 season).
- Most goals scored by player in a league match: Mário Klajman, 5 goals, won 9–0, (against TJ Družstevník Veľké Kostoľany, 6 November 2001), Šimon Valachovič, 5 goals, won 10–0, (against TJ Družstevník Topoľníky, 6 April 2014).
