= Lukáš Zápotoka =

Slovak footballer

Personal information
- Date of birth: 23 September 1985 (age 41)
- Place of birth: Bardejov, Czechoslovakia
- Height: 1.85 m (6 ft 1 in)
- Position: Midfielder

Team information
- Current team: Partizán Bardejov
- Number: 17

Youth career
- Partizán Bardejov
- MFK Dubnica

Senior career*
Years	Team	Apps	(Gls)
2005–2008	Dubnica	21	(0)
2006–2007	→Šaľa "loan"		
2008–2009	→Dunajská Streda "loan"	10	(0)
2009–2010	Dubnica		
2010	→Karviná "loan"		
2011–	Bardejov	12	(2)
- * Club domestic league appearances and goals as of 12 June 2011

Lukáš Zápotoka (born 23 September 1985, in Bardejov) is a Slovak football who plays as a midfielder for the 2. liga club Partizán Bardejov.
