= Martin Polaček =

Slovak footballer

Personal information
- Full name: Martin Polaček
- Date of birth: 2 April 1990 (age 36)
- Place of birth: Prešov, Czechoslovakia
- Height: 1.98 m (6 ft 6 in)
- Position: Goalkeeper

Team information
- Current team: GLKS Wilkowice

Youth career
- Tatran Prešov

Senior career*
Years	Team	Apps	(Gls)
2009–2011	Zbrojovka Brno	0	(0)
2011–2012	Spišská Nová Ves		
2012	→ Bodva Moldava (loan)	11	(0)
2012–2013	Dunajská Streda	28	(0)
2013–2015	Slovan Bratislava	16	(0)
2015	→ Dunajská Streda (loan)	13	(0)
2015–2017	Zagłębie Lubin	77	(0)
2018	Mladá Boleslav	13	(0)
2018–2019	Levski Sofia	15	(0)
2019–2022	Podbeskidzie	50	(0)
2022	Mladá Boleslav	6	(0)
2023	Liptovský Mikuláš	7	(0)
2024–2026	Sandecja Nowy Sącz	47	(0)
2026–	GLKS Wilkowice	0	(0)

International career
2017	Slovakia	1	(0)
- * Club domestic league appearances and goals as of 14:16, 6 June 2026 (UTC)

Martin Polaček (born 2 April 1990) is a Slovak professional footballer who plays as a goalkeeper for V liga Silesia club GLKS Wilkowice.

== International career ==
On 10 November 2017, Polaček made his international debut for Slovakia in the 46th minute of a friendly match against Ukraine, substituting Martin Dúbravka.

== Career statistics ==
=== International ===
Appearances and goals by national team and year
National team	Year	Apps	Goals
Slovakia
Slovakia	2017	1	0
Total		1	0

== Honours ==
Slovan Bratislava

- Slovak First Football League: 2013–14

Sandecja Nowy Sącz

- III liga, group IV: 2024–25
- Polish Cup (Nowy Sącz regionals): 2024–25
