= Ján Zápotoka =

Slovak footballer

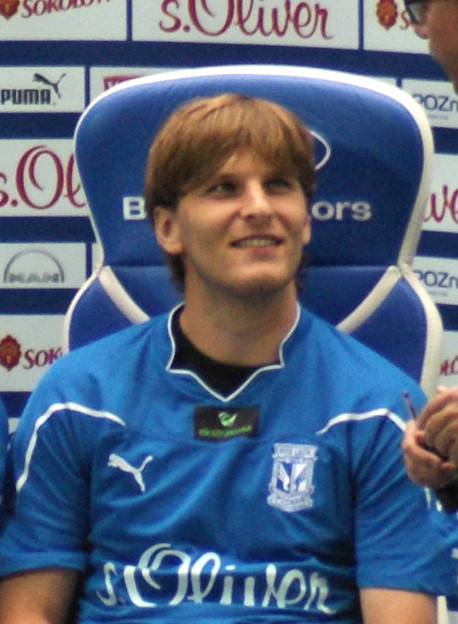

Personal information
- Full name: Ján Zápotoka
- Date of birth: 23 March 1988 (age 38)
- Place of birth: Bardejov, Czechoslovakia
- Height: 1.88 m (6 ft 2 in)
- Position: Attacking midfielder

Team information
- Current team: BFC 2018 Bardejov

Youth career
- BŠK Bardejov

Senior career*
Years	Team	Apps	(Gls)
2006–2009	MFK Dubnica	64	(9)
2009–2012	Lech Poznań	14	(0)
2011	→ MFK Dubnica (loan)	13	(0)
2012	Drustav SK Hrabovčík		
2013–2015	Partizán Bardejov	58	(22)
2015–2016	Poprad	26	(4)
2018–2019	FK Gerlachov		
2019–2021	Slovan Dolné Kočkovce		
2021–2022	FK Gerlachov		
2022–	BFC 2018 Bardejov		

International career
2006–2007	Slovakia U19	15	(1)
- * Club domestic league appearances and goals as of 30 October 2024

Ján Zápotoka (born 23 March 1988) is a Slovak footballer who plays as a midfielder for VII. Liga club BFC 2018 Bardejov.

== Career ==
=== Club ===
In August 2009, Zápotoka joined Lech Poznań on a four-year contract.

In February 2011, he was loaned to MFK Dubnica on a half year deal.

=== International ===
He was a part of the Slovakia under-19 team.

== Honours ==
Lech Poznań

- Ekstraklasa: 2009–10
