= FC ŠTK 1914 Šamorín =

Slovak football club

- Full name: FC ŠTK 1914 Šamorín
- Founded: 1914; 112 years ago
- Ground: Pomlé Stadium, Šamorín
- Capacity: 1,950 (750 seated)
- President: Csaba Horváth
- Head coach: Michal Kuruc
- League: 2. liga
- 2025–26: 2. liga (10th of 16)
- Website: stksamorin.sk
Home colours	Away colours

ŠTK 1914 Šamorín is a Slovak football team, based in the town of Šamorín. The club was founded in 1914. In the season 2009–10, they were promoted to Slovak Third League. In season 2015–16 the club was promoted to the Slovak Second League.

== History ==
The club was founded on 1 June 1914 (original name in Hungarian Somorjai Testgyakorlók Köre). Their first stadium (in Pomlé, Šamorín) was opened in 1930. Their first game in the stadium, against FSV Vienna was a sweet 2–0 victory in front of 1,500 spectators. In 2010 December Csutora made an agreement to exchange steel for the seats of the old HC Slovan Bratislava ground (Because a new stadium was getting built, for the 2011 IIHF World Championship that was held in Slovakia). He received over 500 seats, which replaced the old benches there.

In 2015, STK Samorin signed a partnership with one of the biggest Brazilian teams, Fluminense FC. In the same season, the club was promoted to Slovakia's second division and, in 2016–2017 season, was seeking promotion to Fortuna Liga, the Slovak top flight.

== Affiliated clubs ==
The following clubs are affiliated with FC ŠTK 1914 Šamorín:

- (Brazil) Fluminense FC (2015–2019)
- (Slovakia) DAC 1904 Dunajská Streda (2019–)

== Current squad ==
As of 17 August 2026

Note: Flags indicate national team as defined under FIFA eligibility rules; some limited exceptions apply. Players may hold more than one non-FIFA nationality.

No.	Pos.	Nation	Player
4	MF	ARM	Abov Avetisyan
5	MF	SVK	Stefan Varga
6	DF	MLI	Arnaud Konan
7	FW	SVK	Daniel Pavúk
8	MF	GEO	Luka Bubuteishvili
9	FW	NGR	Onyebuchi Solomon
10	FW	SVK	Marian Weber
11	MF	SVK	Samuel Bednar
12	GK	GRE	Vasilios Kaltsas
14	DF	SVK	Michal Ranko
15	DF	SVK	Draško Marič-Bjekič
16	MF	SVK	Marko Totka
17	FW	SVK	Balint Kireth
18	DF	SVK	Giuliano Antonio Marek (on loan from Ružomberok)

No.	Pos.	Nation	Player
19	MF	CIV	Zoumana Ky
20	MF	SVK	Karol Blaško (on loan from DAC Dunajská Streda)
21	FW	BFA	Salif Simpore
22	DF	SVK	Marcel Kucman
23	DF	SVK	Vladimír Bajtoš
25	DF	BFA	Rachid Barro (on loan from DAC Dunajská Streda)
27	FW	SVK	Oliver Reiter
29	MF	CIV	Mohamed Diakite
29	FW	COD	Seraphin Useni
38	GK	SVK	Alex Hudok (on loan from Trenčín)
66	MF	SVK	Peter Varga
—	GK	SVK	Andreas Barninec

For recent transfers, see List of Slovak football transfers summer 2024.

== Current technical staff ==
Position	Staff
Manager	(Slovakia) Michal Kuruc
Assistant coach	(Slovakia) Rastislav Božik
President	(Slovakia) Csaba Horváth
Youth manager	(Slovakia) Juraj Hajdúch
Goalkeeper coach	(Slovakia) Juraj Baláž
Masseur	(Slovakia) Domsitz Márton
Fitness coach	(Hungary) Házi Bence

- Last updated: 1 March 2024

== Notable players ==
Had international caps for their respective countries. Players whose name is listed in bold represented their countries while playing for Šamorín.

Past (and present) players who are the subjects of Wikipedia articles can be found here.

- (Slovakia) Ladislav Almási
- (Slovakia) Kristián Bari
- (Slovakia) Balázs Borbély
- (Brazil) Evanilson
- (Slovakia) Csaba Horváth
- (The Gambia) Sainey Njie
- (Slovakia) Sebastian Nebyla
- (Hungary) Milán Vitális

== Notable coaches ==
- (Slovakia) Vladimír Koník (2011–12)
- (Slovakia) Libor Fašiang (2013)
- (Slovakia) Miroslav Hýll (2014)
- (Slovakia) Jozef Kontír (Apr 2015 - Nov 2015)
- (United States) Mike Keeney (Jan 2016 – Jan 2017)
- (Finland) Mika Lönnström (Jan 2017 – Mar 2018)
- (Brazil) Gustavo Leal (Mar 2018 – Dec 2018)
- (Bosnia and Herzegovina) Sanjin Alagić (Dec 2018 – June 2019)
- (Slovakia) Branislav Sokoli (June 2019 – Oct 2019)
- (Slovakia) Ján Blaháč (Oct 2019–Dec 2020)
- (Slovakia) Michal Kuruc (Feb 2021-Dec 2022)
- (Slovakia) Juraj Ančic (Jan 2023-Nov 2023)
- (Slovakia) Pavol Gregora (Nov 2023-Dec 2023)
- (Estonia) Vladimir Vassiljev (Jan 2024-May 2025)
- (Slovakia) Albert Rusnák (May 2025-Feb 2026)
- (Slovakia) Martin Stopka (Feb 2026-Mar 2026)
- (Slovakia) Michal Kuruc (Mar 2026-present)
