= Tomáš Vengřinek =

Czech footballer

Personal information
- Date of birth: 8 June 1992 (age 34)
- Place of birth: Czechoslovakia
- Height: 1.78 m (5 ft 10 in)
- Position: Defender

Team information
- Current team: Baník Ostrava
- Number: 12

Senior career*
Years	Team	Apps	(Gls)
2013–	Baník Ostrava	14	(1)
2015	→ FK Senica (loan)	9	(0)

International career
2008	Czech Republic U16	2	(0)
- * Club domestic league appearances and goals as of 27 July 2014

Tomáš Vengřinek (born 8 June 1992) is a Czech football player who plays for FC Baník Ostrava.

Vengřinek has played international football at under-16 level for Czech Republic U16.
