= Denis Švec =

Slovak footballer

Personal information
- Full name: Denis Švec
- Date of birth: 16 March 1996 (age 30)
- Place of birth: Slovakia
- Height: 1.87 m (6 ft 2 in)
- Position: Defender

Team information
- Current team: FK Dubnica
- Number: 21

Youth career
- Dubnica

Senior career*
Years	Team	Apps	(Gls)
2013–2014	Dubnica	13	(0)
2014–	Myjava	14	(0)
2015	→ Šaľa (loan)	14	(0)
2016	MFK Nová Dubnica	0	(0)
2016	Zlaté Moravce - Vráble	3	(0)
2017–	Dubnica		
- * Club domestic league appearances and goals as of 25 February 2018

Denis Švec (born 16 March 1996) is a Slovak football defender who currently plays for FK Dubnica in the 3. liga.

== Club career ==
=== Spartak Myjava ===
He made his professional debut for Spartak Myjava against MŠK Žilina on 3 August 2014.
