= Pavol Cicman =

Slovak football striker

Personal information
- Full name: Pavol Cicman
- Date of birth: 30 January 1985 (age 41)
- Place of birth: Czechoslovakia
- Height: 1.75 m (5 ft 9 in)
- Positions: Forward; winger

Team information
- Current team: Slovan Kendice

Youth career
- –2005: Tatran Prešov

Senior career*
Years	Team	Apps	(Gls)
2005–2011	Tatran Prešov	13	(0)
2007	→ Stará Ľubovňa (loan)		
2008	→ Humenné (loan)		
2009–2010	→ Dolný Kubín (loan)		
2011	→ Dolný Kubín (loan)	15	(6)
2011–2014	Piast Gliwice	67	(5)
2014	Siarka Tarnobrzeg	9	(1)
2015	Bohemians 1905	2	(0)
2015	Senica	5	(0)
2016	Tatran Prešov	9	(0)
2016–2017	Svidník		
2018–2019	Šarišské Michaľany		
2020	Watra Białka Tatrzańska	14	(3)
2021–	Slovan Kendice		
- * Club domestic league appearances and goals as of 29 January 2024

Pavol Cicman (born 30 January 1985) is a Slovak professional footballer who plays as a striker who plays for Slovan Kendice.

== Career ==
In July 2011, he joined Piast Gliwice on a one-year contract.

In September 2014, he went on trial to Italian Lega Pro (third division) outfit Juve Stabia, but was ultimately not signed.

== Honours ==
Piast Gliwice

- I liga: 2011–12
