= Július Gombala =

Slovak footballer

Personal information
- Full name: Július Gombala
- Date of birth: 9 January 1993 (age 33)
- Place of birth: Banská Bystrica, Slovakia
- Height: 1.83 m (6 ft 0 in)
- Positions: Right back; defensive midfielder

Team information
- Current team: ŠK Igram

Youth career
- 1999–2009: Dukla Banská Bystrica
- 2009–2011: Birmingham City

Senior career*
Years	Team	Apps	(Gls)
2011–2014	ŽP Šport Podbrezová Podbrezová	4	(0)
2013	→ Baník Ružiná (loan)	2	(1)
2013	→ Tatran Liptovský Mikuláš (loan)	5	(0)
2013–2014	→ Kremnička (loan)		
2014–2015	Senica	3	(0)
2015	Dukla Banská Bystrica	8	(0)
2016	Gabčíkovo	14	(2)
2016–2019	Spartak Trnava B		
2019–2020	SC Frauenkirchen	13	(0)
2020–2021	Družstevník Pavlice		
2021–	ŠK Igram		

International career
- Slovakia U16
- Slovakia U17
- * Club domestic league appearances and goals as of 1 July 2016

Július Gombala (born 9 January 1993) is a Slovak footballer who plays as a right back or a defensive midfielder for ŠK Igram.

== Career ==
Gombala played youth football for Birmingham City.

Gombala made his professional Fortuna Liga's debut for FK Senica on 28 November 2014 against FC Spartak Trnava. He signed his first professional contract for FC Spartak Trnava in July 2018, having played for the club for two years, although never played for the club's A-team.

After a spell in Austria at SC Frauenkirchen, he returned to Slovakia in March 2020 and joined OZ TJ Družstevník Pavlice. In the summer 2021, he moved to ŠK Igram.

He exited top-flight football in the spring of 2019 and subsequently became a barber.
