= Družstevník Topoľníky =

Slovak football club

TJ Družstevník Topoľníky
- Full name: TJ Družstevník Topoľníky
- Ground: Štadión TJ Družstevník Topoľníky, Topoľníky
- Chairman: Zsolt Dorák, Attila Nagy
- Manager: Ivan Egri
- League: Majstrovstvá regiónu
- 2013-14: 10th

TJ Družstevník Topoľníky is a Slovak football team, based in the town of Topoľníky.
