= 2011–12 MŠK Žilina season =

MŠK Žilina
2011–12 season
- President: Jozef Antošík
- Head Coach: Ľubomír Nosický
- Stadium: Stadium pod Dubňom, Žilina
- Corgoň Liga: 1st
- Slovnaft Cup: Winners
- UEFA Europa League: Second qualifying round
- Top goalscorer: League: Majtán (10); All: Majtán (11)
- Highest home attendance: 4,129 (vs Spartak Trnava, 21 August 2011)
- Lowest home attendance: 1,538 (vs Tatran Prešov, 22 October 2011)
Home colours	Away colours

The 2011–12 MŠK Žilina season was the 18th straight season that the club played in the Slovak First League, the highest tier of football in Slovakia.

== Squad ==
As of 18 February 2012
Note: Flags indicate national team as defined under FIFA eligibility rules; some limited exceptions apply. Players may hold more than one non-FIFA nationality.

No.	Pos.	Nation	Player
2	DF	SVK	Stanislav Angelovič
4	MF	SVK	Adam Žilák
5	MF	SVK	Milan Škriniar
6	DF	SVK	Pavol Ilko
7	DF	SVK	Vladimír Leitner
8	DF	SVK	Marcel Ondráš
9	MF	SVK	Roman Gergel
10	FW	SVK	Tomáš Majtán
11	MF	SVK	Miroslav Barčík (captain)
12	MF	SVK	Viktor Pečovský
14	FW	SVK	Ján Novák
15	DF	SVK	Jozef Piaček
17	FW	SVK	Róbert Pich
18	FW	GAM	Momodou Ceesay

No.	Pos.	Nation	Player
19	DF	TOG	Serge Akakpo
20	MF	SVK	Peter Šulek
21	DF	SVK	Martin Kubena
22	GK	SVK	Martin Krnáč
23	FW	SVK	Jaroslav Mihálik
24	FW	PER	Jean Deza
26	GK	SVK	František Plach
28	MF	BEN	Bello Babatounde
29	DF	GHA	Prince Ofori
30	GK	SVK	Martin Dúbravka
33	GK	SVK	Matej Rakovan
44	GK	SVK	Dominik Holec
45	DF	CMR	Ernest Mabouka
77	DF	POR	Ricardo Nunes

== Transfers ==
=== In ===
Date	Position	Player	From	Fee
9 June 2011	MF	(Slovakia) Miroslav Barčík	Polonia Bytom	Undisclosed
23 June 2011	MF	(Slovakia) Viktor Pečovský	Dukla Banská Bystrica	Undisclosed
18 June 2011	MF	(Slovakia) Peter Šulek	MFK Dubnica	Undisclosed
11 July 2011	FW	(Czech Republic) David Střihavka	Willem II	Free
11 July 2011	MF	(Slovakia) Adam Žilák	ViOn Zlaté Moravce	Loan expiration
11 July 2011	MF	(Serbia) Nemanja Zlatković	Diagoras	Loan expiration
23 August 2011	FW	(Peru) Jean Deza	Academia Deportiva Cantolao	Undisclosed
19 September 2011	DF	(Bosnia and Herzegovina) Semir Kerla	Panserraikos	Undisclosed
26 November 2011	FW	(Slovakia) Jaroslav Mihálik	Youth programme	
4 January 2012	FW	(Slovakia) Ján Novák	MFK Košice	Undisclosed
17 January 2012	DF	(Togo) Serge Akakpo	NK Celje	Undisclosed
31 January 2012	DF	(Portugal) Ricardo Nunes	Portimonense	Undisclosed

=== Out ===
Date	Position	Player	To	Fee
31 May 2011	DF	(Czech Republic) Ondřej Šourek	Podbeskidzie Bielsko-Biała	Undisclosed
6 June 2011	FW	(Belgium) Wim Bokila	Released	
13 June 2011	DF	(Slovakia) Oliver Práznovský	MFK Ružomberok	
23 June 2011	DF	(Slovakia) Juraj Chupač	FK Dukla Banská Bystrica	
23 June 2011	GK	(Slovakia) Patrik Le Giang	MFK Zemplín Michalovce	
23 June 2011	MF	(Slovakia) Michal Škvarka	MFK Zemplín Michalovce	
23 June 2011	FW	(Slovakia) Emil Le Giang	MFK Zemplín Michalovce	
23 June 2011	FW	(Slovakia) Dominik Fotyik	MFK Zemplín Michalovce	
30 June 2011	MF	(Latvia) Arturs Zjuzins	Released	
1 July 2011	MF	(Slovakia) Jakub Paur	FC ViOn Zlaté Moravce	
1 July 2011	DF	(Slovakia) Patrik Šimko	1. FC Tatran Prešov	
11 July 2011	DF	(Slovakia) Martin Poleť	Released	
11 July 2011	GK	(Slovakia) Matej Rakovan	MFK Tatran Liptovský Mikuláš	
19 July 2011	MF	(Slovakia) Michal Janec	MŠK Rimavská Sobota	
19 July 2011	DF	(Slovakia) Lukáš Mravec	MŠK Rimavská Sobota	
20 July 2011	DF	(Slovakia) Miroslav Minarčík	MŠK Rimavská Sobota	
21 July 2011	DF	(The Gambia) Ali Ceesay	MFK Zemplín Michalovce	
22 July 2011	MF	(Czech Republic) Martin Vyskočil	FC Spartak Trnava	Undisclosed
2 August 2011	MF	(Slovakia) Ľubomír Guldan	Ludogorets Razgrad	Undisclosed
11 August 2011	MF	(Slovakia) Pavol Poliaček	FC Baník Ostrava	Undisclosed
6 September 2011	FW	(Slovakia) Ivan Lietava	FK Dukla Prague	Undisclosed
20 September 2011	MF	(Czech Republic) Emil Rilke	FC Slovan Liberec	Undisclosed
31 December 2012	DF	(Bosnia and Herzegovina) Semir Kerla	Loan expiration	
2 January 2012	MF	(Slovakia) Zdeno Štrba	Released	
2 January 2012	MF	(Serbia) Nemanja Zlatković	Released	
2 January 2012	MF	(Slovakia) Štefan Zošák	Released	
2 January 2012	FW	(Czech Republic) David Střihavka	Released	
7 January 2012	DF	(Slovakia) Patrik Mráz	Śląsk Wrocław	Undisclosed

== Pre-season and friendlies ==
18 June 2011 Friendly	MŠK Žilina (Slovakia)	4–2	Liptovský Mikuláš (Slovakia)	Žilina
	Lietava 23'; Guldan 27'; Fotyik 55'; Gergel 77'	Report	Tomko 65' (pen.); Šlosár 82'	Attendance: 200

18 June 2011 Friendly	MŠK Žilina (Slovakia)	0–0	Petržalka (Slovakia)	Žilina
		Report		Stadium: Stadium pod Dubňom; Attendance: 1,000

22 June 2011 Friendly	MŠK Žilina (Slovakia)	4–0	Lučenec (Slovakia)	Žilina
18:00 CEST	Majtán 52'; Lietava 61', 63', 65'	Report		Stadium: Stadium pod Dubňom; Attendance: 1,500

25 June 2011 Friendly	MŠK Žilina (Slovakia)	0–0	Cracovia (Poland)	Žilina
15:00 CEST		Report		Stadium: Stadium pod Dubňom; Attendance: 1,200

29 June 2011 Friendly	Újpest (Hungary)	0–4	MŠK Žilina (Slovakia)	Šamorín
		Report	Střihavka 31'; Lietava 32'; Gergel 74'; Fotyik 79'	Attendance: 500

2 July 2011 Friendly	Olomouc (Czech Republic)	0–0	MŠK Žilina (Slovakia)	Hutisko, Czech Republic
		Report		Attendance: 300

7 July 2011 Friendly	Górnik Zabrze (Poland)	1–1	MŠK Žilina (Slovakia)	Waksmund, Poland
17:00 CEST	Gołębiewski 2'	Report	Ceesay 66'

14 January 2012 Friendly	MŠK Žilina (Slovakia)	4–0	Považská Bystrica (Slovakia)	Žilina
12:00 CEST	Mihálik 10'; Angelovič 66'; Bello 73'; Dedič 80'	Report		Attendance: 200

14 January 2012 Friendly	MŠK Žilina (Slovakia)	2–0	LKS Skałka Żabnica (Poland)	Žilina
14:00 CEST	Majtán 13'; Martinka 80'	Report		Attendance: 300

25 January 2012 Friendly	MŠK Žilina (Slovakia)	3–0	Třinec (Czech Republic)	Žilina
11:00 CEST	Mabouka 43' (pen.); Bello 58'; Pich 90'	Report		Attendance: 150

25 January 2012 Friendly	MŠK Žilina (Slovakia)	3–2	Lučenec (Slovakia)	Žilina
14:00 CEST	Ondráš 28'; Ceesay 45' (pen.), 56'	Report	Kulík 60' (pen.), 71' (pen.)	Attendance: 150

28 January 2012 Friendly	MŠK Žilina (Slovakia)	1–0	Dubnica (Slovakia)	Žilina
11:00 CEST	Novák 36'	Report

28 January 2012 Friendly	MŠK Žilina (Slovakia)	0–1	Ruch Chorzów (Poland)	Žilina
13:00 CEST		Report	Jankowski 31'

4 February 2012 Antalya Cup	MŠK Žilina (Slovakia)	1–1 (4–3 p)	Red Star Belgrade (Serbia)	Antalya, Turkey
17:00 CEST	Pich 32'	Report	Lazović 31'
	Penalties
	Majtán (penalty scored); Pich (penalty scored); Barčík (penalty scored); Ondráš (penalty scored)		Perović (penalty scored); Dimitrijević (penalty scored); Petković (penalty missed); Mirić (penalty scored); Tošić (penalty missed)

6 February 2012 Friendly	MŠK Žilina (Slovakia)	1–2	Tavriya (Ukraine)	Antalya, Turkey
14:30 CEST	Deza 54'	Report	Ondráš 13' (o.g.); Shynder 66'

7 February 2012 Antalya Cup	MŠK Žilina (Slovakia)	2–2 (1–4 p)	Cluj (Romania)	Antalya, Turkey
16:00 CEST	Barčík 20'; Ceesay 65' (pen.)	Report	Hora 39' (pen.); Cadú 80'
	Penalties
	Ceesay (penalty scored); Pich (penalty missed); Barčík (penalty missed)		Sougou (penalty scored); Bastos (penalty scored); Piccolo (penalty scored); Kapetanos (penalty scored)

10 February 2012 Friendly	MŠK Žilina (Slovakia)	0–1	Rostov (Russia)	Antalya, Turkey
14:00 CEST		Report	Bracamonte 55'

18 February 2012 Friendly	MŠK Žilina (Slovakia)	3–0	Michalovce (Slovakia)	Žilina
12:00 CEST	Majtán 9'; Novák 61'; Škriniar 81'	Report

25 February 2012 Friendly	Trenčín (Slovakia)	4–2	MŠK Žilina (Slovakia)	Trenčín
11:00 CEST	Depetris 21'; Hlohovský 43'; Salinas 50'; Peltier 55'	Report	Ceesay 9'; Piaček 65'	Attendance: 20; Referee: Ježík

25 February 2012 Friendly	Trenčín (Slovakia)	0–0	MŠK Žilina (Slovakia)	Trenčín
13:30 CEST		Report		Attendance: 150; Referee: Jaška

== Competition ==
=== Slovak First Football League ===
Pos	Team	Pld	W	D	L	GF	GA	GD	Pts	Qualification or relegation
1	Žilina (C)	33	19	10	4	52	27	+25	67	Qualification for Champions League second qualifying round
2	Spartak Trnava	33	19	8	6	44	22	+22	65	Qualification for Europa League second qualifying round
3	Slovan Bratislava	33	16	11	6	48	35	+13	59	Qualification for Europa League second qualifying round
4	Senica	33	15	12	6	47	23	+24	57	Qualification for Europa League first qualifying round (Note: Since 2011–12 Slovak Cup winners Žilina qualified for the 2012–13 UEFA Champions League, so cup runners-up Senica qualified for the 2012–13 UEFA Europa League first qualifying round. Moreover, Slovan Bratislava were moved up a round as the cup winner spot was not used.)
5	Trenčín	33	12	12	9	51	49	+2	48	

Source: Kicker (in German)
Rules for classification: 1) points; 2) goal difference; 3) number of goals scored.
(C) Champions

==== Results by round ====
Round	1	2	3	4	5	6	7	8	9	10	11	12	13	14	15	16	17	18	19	20	21	22	23	24	25	26	27	28	29	30	31	32	33
Ground	H	A	H	A	H	H	A	H	A	H	A	A	H	A	H	A	A	H	A	H	A	H	H	A	H	A	H	H	A	H	A	H	A
Result	D	D	W	W	D	L	W	D	W	W	L	W	W	L	W	D	D	W	D	W	W	W	W	D	W	D	D	W	L	W	W	W	W
Position	7	8	6	4	4	6	3	4	2	1	4	3	2	3	2	2	2	1	4	4	3	2	1	1	1	1	1	1	1	1	1	1	1

Updated to match(es) played on 13 May 2012. Source: La Liga
A = Away; H = Home; W = Win; D = Draw; L = Loss

==== Matches ====
17 July 2011 1	MŠK Žilina	1–1	Košice	Žilina
19:30	Majtán 36'	Summary	Čonka 27' (red card) 85'	Stadium: Stadium pod Dubňom; Attendance: 2,011; Referee: (Slovakia) Vladimír Vnuk

24 July 2011 2	Prešov	0–0	MŠK Žilina	Prešov
17:30	Piter-Bučko (red card) 44'	Summary		Stadium: Tatran Stadium; Attendance: 2,155; Referee: (Slovakia) Ivan Kružliak

30 July 2011 3	MŠK Žilina	2–1	Slovan Bratislava	Žilina
19:30	Barčík 5'; Šulek 37'	Summary	Halenár 19'	Stadium: Stadium pod Dubňom; Attendance: 4,115; Referee: (Slovakia) Mário Vlk

7 August 2011 4	Senica	1–2	MŠK Žilina	Senica
19:30	Kroupa 67'	Summary	Šulek 6'; Ceesay 58'	Stadium: Stadium FK Senica; Attendance: 1,351; Referee: Dušan Sedlák

13 August 2011 5	Žilina	0–0	AS Trenčín	Žilina
19:30	Ofori (red card) 89'	Summary		Stadium: Stadium pod Dubňom; Attendance: 2,411; Referee: Michal Smolák

21 August 2011 6	MŠK Žilina	0–1	Trnava	Žilina
19:00		Summary	Čarnota 78'	Stadium: Stadium pod Dubňom; Attendance: 4,129; Referee: Ivan Kružliak

27 August 2011 7	Banská Bystrica	1–3	MŠK Žilina	Banská Bystrica
17:30	Turňa 15'	Summary	Majtán 47', 63'; Ceesay 57'	Stadium: SNP Stadium; Attendance: 3,160; Referee: Peter Kráľovič

10 September 2011 8	MŠK Žilina	2–2	Zlaté Moravce	Žilina
19:30	Majtán 39'; Mráz 90'	Summary	Janečka 5'; Hruška 78'	Stadium: Stadium pod Dubňom; Attendance: 2,161; Referee: Ľubomír Samotný

17 September 2011 9	Ružomberok	1–2	MŠK Žilina	Ružomberok
17:30	Masaryk 59'	Summary	Piaček 16'; Střihavka 27'	Stadium: Stadium MFK Ružomberok; Attendance: 3,496; Referee: Michal Smolák

24 September 2011 10	MŠK Žilina	2–0	Nitra	Žilina
19:30	Pich 8'; Mráz 30' (pen.)	Summary	Kaspřák (yellow card) 5' (yellow-red card) 29'	Stadium: Stadium pod Dubňom; Attendance: 2,411; Referee: Štefan Leško

1 October 2011 11	Dunajská Streda	2–1	MŠK Žilina	Dunajská Streda
19:30	Delarge 73', 81'	Summary	Majtán 55'	Stadium: DAC Stadium; Attendance: 1,399; Referee: Jozef Pavlík

15 October 2011 12	Košice	1–2	MŠK Žilina	Košice
14:30	Kavka 44'	Summary	Majtán 37'; Barčík 51'	Stadium: Stadium Lokomotívy v Čermeli; Attendance: 785; Referee: (Slovakia) Ivan Kružliak

22 October 2011 13	MŠK Žilina	1–0	Prešov	Žilina
17:30	Pich 69'	Summary		Stadium: Stadium pod Dubňom; Attendance: 1,538; Referee: (Slovakia) Vladimír Vnuk

29 October 2011 14	Slovan Bratislava	2–1	MŠK Žilina	Bratislava
19:30	Halenár 35', 88'	Summary	Pich 33'; Majtán (yellow card) 4' (yellow-red card) 47'	Stadium: Stadium Pasienky; Attendance: 2,670; Referee: (Slovakia) Peter Kráľovič

5 November 2011 15	MŠK Žilina	3–1	Senica	Žilina
17:30	Šíma 9' (o.g.); Mráz 26', 38' (pen.)	Summary	Valenta 22'	Stadium: Stadium pod Dubňom; Attendance: 2,189; Referee: (Slovakia) Kamil Horváth

23 November 2011 16	AS Trenčín	3–3	Žilina	Trenčín
17:30	Salinas 17'; Štefánik 43'; Ondráš 67' (o.g.)	Summary	Pich 51'; Pečovský 60'; Gergel 78'	Stadium: Stadium na Sihoti; Attendance: 1,310; Referee: Richard Trutz

19 November 2011 17	Trnava	1–1	MŠK Žilina	Trnava
17:30	Karhan 57'	Summary	Mabouka (red card) 60'; Mráz 77' (pen.)	Stadium: Stadium Antona Malatinského; Attendance: 7,642; Referee: (Slovakia) Dušan Sedlák

26 November 2011 18	MŠK Žilina	3–1	Banská Bystrica	Žilina
17:30	Barčík 2'; Ondráš 56'; Pečovský 87'	Summary	Rejdovian (red card) 28'; Ľupták 44'	Stadium: Stadium pod Dubňom; Attendance: 1,812; Referee: (Slovakia) Miroslav Jaška

27 March 2012 19	Zlaté Moravce	1–1	MŠK Žilina	Zlaté Moravce
17:30 CET (UTC+01)	Majerník (yellow card) 17'; Hruška (yellow card) 50'; Pavlenda (yellow card) 63'; Luhový 87'	Summary	Pich 9'; Piaček (yellow card) 82'; Barčík (yellow card) 84'; Pečovský (yellow card) 89'	Stadium: Stadium FC ViOn; Attendance: 1,499; Referee: Richard Trutz

3 March 2012 20	MŠK Žilina	2–1	Ružomberok	Žilina
17:30 CET (UTC+01)	Piaček (yellow card) 7'; Ceesay 55' (pen.); Majtán (yellow card) 63' (goal) 74'; Gergel (yellow card) 90'	Summary	Greššák 18'; Ďubek (yellow card) 42'; Oboya (yellow card) 54'; Vavrík (yellow card) 58'	Stadium: Stadium pod Dubňom; Attendance: 1,476; Referee: Vladimi Hracho

9 March 2012 21	Nitra	0–2	MŠK Žilina	Nitra
17:30 CET (UTC+01)	Harbuľák (yellow card) 16'	Summary	Majtán 17'; Ricardo Nunes (yellow card) 21'; Piaček 34'	Stadium: Stadium pod Zoborom; Attendance: 1,090; Referee: Mario Vik

17 March 2012 22	MŠK Žilina	2–0	Dunajská Streda	Žilina
17:30 CET (UTC+01)	Pich 21'; Barčík 90'	Summary	Laštovka (yellow card) 67'; Boya (yellow card) 78'; Kabele (yellow card) 90'	Stadium: Stadium pod Dubňom; Attendance: 2,211; Referee: Michal Smolak

24 March 2012 23	MŠK Žilina	1–0	Košice	Žilina
17:30	Novák 38'; Gergel (yellow card) 79'; Mabouka (yellow card) 82'	Summary	Sekulić (yellow card) 90'; Nurković (yellow card) 90'	Stadium: Stadium pod Dubňom; Attendance: 2,337; Referee: Jozef Pavlik

31 March 2012 24	Prešov	1–1	MŠK Žilina	Prešov
14:30	Adam 45' (pen.); Střihavka (yellow card) 49'	Summary	Gergel (yellow card) 68'; Deza 82'; Barčík (yellow card) 84'	Stadium: Tatran Stadium; Attendance: 1,650; Referee: Richard Matúš

3 April 2012 25	MŠK Žilina	3–0	Slovan Bratislava	Žilina
17:30	Babatounde 47', 89'; Pich 59'; Gergel (yellow card) 63'; Ricardo Nunes (yellow card) 77'	Summary	Konečný (yellow card) 4'; Kladrubský (yellow card) 58'; Pečalka (yellow card) 67'; Kopúnek (yellow card) 79'	Stadium: Stadium pod Dubňom; Attendance: 4,912; Referee: Miroslav Zelinka

7 April 2012 26	Senica	1–1	MŠK Žilina	Senica
17:30	Pavlík 29'; Kóňa (yellow card) 52'; Štepanovský (yellow card) 71'	Summary	Pich 36'	Stadium: Stadium FK Senica; Attendance: 2,489; Referee: Jozef Pavlik

14 April 2012 27	MŠK Žilina	2–2	Trenčín	Žilina
17:30	Piaček 8'; Barčík 16'; Pich (yellow card) 57'	Summary	Štefánik 14'; Čögley (yellow card) 49'; Baéz (yellow card) 56'; Peltier 74'	Stadium: Stadium pod Dubňom; Attendance: 3,036; Referee: Vladimir Vnuk

20 April 2012 28	MŠK Žilina	1–0	Trnava	Žilina
17:30	Majtán 37'; Pečovský (yellow card) 72'; Babatounde (yellow card) 81'; Ricardo Nunes (yellow card) 90'	Summary	Karhan (yellow card) 69'; Vyskočil (yellow card) 71' (yellow-red card) 77'; Čvirik (yellow card) 89'	Stadium: Stadium pod Dubňom; Attendance: 8,132; Referee: Radek Matejek

28 April 2012 29	Banská Bystrica	2–1	MŠK Žilina	Banská Bystrica
17:30	Matúš 31', 35' (yellow card) 68'; Poljovka (yellow card) 54'; Rejdovian (yellow card) 74'	Summary	Pich 33'; Piaček (yellow card) 40'; Novák (yellow card) 61'; Pečovský (yellow card) 71'	Stadium: SNP Stadium; Attendance: 1,870; Referee: I.Kružliak

4 May 2012 30	MŠK Žilina	1–0	Zlaté Moravce	Žilina
17:30	Mabouka (yellow card) 71'; Leitner 75'	Summary	Husár (yellow card) 35'; Pavlenda (yellow card) 58' (yellow-red card) 90'; Michal Pinter (red card) 77'; Orávik (yellow card) 84'	Stadium: Stadium pod Dubňom; Attendance: 2,571; Referee: Martin Ježík

12 May 2012 31	Ružomberok	0–1	MŠK Žilina	Ružomberok
17:30	Pekár (yellow card) 55'; Maslo (yellow card) 60'; Masaryk (yellow card) 75'	Summary	Piaček (yellow card) 37'; Leitner 41' (yellow card) 75'; Pečovský (yellow card) 53'	Stadium: Stadium MFK Ružomberok; Attendance: 1,983; Referee: Lubmir Samotný

16 May 2012 32	MŠK Žilina	2–0	Nitra	Žilina
17:30	Piaček 11'; Pich 45+1'	Summary		Stadium: Stadium pod Dubňom

20 May 2012 33	Dunajská Streda	0–2	MŠK Žilina	Dunajská Streda
17:30		Summary	Marcin 56' (o.g.); Deza 86'	Stadium: DAC Stadium; Attendance: 1,077; Referee: Jozef Pavlik

=== Slovnaft Cup 11–12 ===
13 September 2011 Round of 32	Spišská Nová Ves	0–5	MŠK Žilina	Spišská Nová Ves
16:30		Summary	Střihavka 19' (pen.); Majtán 48', 60', 90'; Pich 84'	Stadium: Stadium Spišská Nová Ves; Attendance: 2,600; Referee: Dušan Sedlák

27 September 2011 Round of 16	Poprad	0–0 (a.e.t.) (3–4 p)	MŠK Žilina	Poprad
16:30		Summary		Stadium: Stadium FK Poprad; Attendance: 1,781; Referee: Miroslav Jaška
	Penalties
	Kočiš (penalty missed); Rams (penalty scored); Ondruš (penalty missed); Dulovič (penalty scored); Pitoňák (penalty scored)		Zošák (penalty scored); Mráz (penalty scored); Barčík (penalty scored); Pich (penalty missed); Ondráš (penalty scored)

18 October 2011 Quarterfinals	Žilina	2–1	Tatran Prešov	Žilina
17:30	Mráz 60' (pen.); Deza 75'	Summary	Macko 8'	Stadium: Stadium pod Dubňom; Attendance: 714; Referee: Vladimír Hracho

1 November 2011 Quarterfinals	Tatran Prešov	2–1 (a.e.t.) (4–5 p)	Žilina	Prešov
14:00	Krajník 45'; Guba 72'	Summary	Ceesay 57'	Stadium: Tatran Stadium; Attendance: 1,451; Referee: Martin Ježík
	Penalties
	Adam (penalty scored); Kolbas (penalty missed); Petráš (penalty scored); Piter-Bučko (penalty scored); Krob (penalty scored)		Střihavka (penalty scored); Mráz (penalty scored); Barčík (penalty scored); Kerla (penalty scored); Mabouka (penalty scored)

17 April 2012 Semi-finals	MŠK Žilina	1–0	Banská Bystrica	Žilina
17:30	Akakpo 47'; Pečovský (yellow card) 52'; Barčík (yellow card) 87'	Summary	Poljovka (yellow card) 28'; Považanec (yellow card) 80'; Pančík (yellow card) 81'	Stadium: Stadium pod Dubňom; Attendance: 1,824; Referee: Jozef Pavlik

24 April 2012 Semi-finals	Banská Bystrica	0–0 (0–1 agg.)	MŠK Žilina	Banská Bystrica
17:30	Považanec (yellow card) 65'	Summary	Ceesay (red card) 63'	Stadium: SNP Stadium; Attendance: 2,210; Referee: Miroslav Fajcik

8 May 2012 Final	MŠK Žilina	3–2 (a.e.t.)	FK Senica	Bardejov
12:30	Majtán 6'; Barčík 48'; Deza 102'	Report	Kóňa 10', 71'	Stadium: Mestský štadión Attendance: 3,000; Referee: Lubomir Samotný

=== UEFA Europa League ===
Kickoff times are in CET.

Win Draw Loss

==== Qualifying rounds ====
===== Second qualifying round =====
14 August 2011 First Leg	KR (Iceland)	3–0	(Slovakia) MŠK Žilina	KR-völlur, Reykjavík, Island
21:15 CEST	Guðjónsson 25'; Arnarsson 51'; Finnbogason 55' (pen.)	Report	Šulek (yellow card) 35' (yellow-red card) 49'	Referee: (Austria) Gerhard Grobelnik

27 August 2011 Second Leg	MŠK Žilina (Slovakia)	2–0 (2–3 agg.)	(Iceland) KR	Stadium pod Dubňom, Žilina
19:30 CEST	Majtán 29'; Ceesay 70'	Report		Attendance: 3,412; Referee: (Norway) Ken Henry Johnsen

== Player seasonal records ==
Competitive matches only. Updated to games played 26 November 2011.

=== Top scorers ===
Rank	Name	League	Europe	Cup	Total
1	(Slovakia) Tomáš Majtán	6	1	3	10
2	(Slovakia) Patrik Mráz	5	–	1	6
3	(Slovakia) Róbert Pich	4	–	1	5
4	(The Gambia) Momodou Ceesay	2	1	1	4
5	(Slovakia) Miroslav Barčík	3	–	-	3
5	(Slovakia) Peter Šulek	2	–	-	2
5	(Slovakia) Viktor Pečovský	2	–	-	2
5	(Czech Republic) David Střihavka	1	–	1	2
6	(Peru) Jean Deza	-	–	1	1
6	(Slovakia) Jozef Piaček	1	–	-	1
6	(Slovakia) Marcel Ondráš	1	–	-	1
6	Own goal	1	–	-	1
	TOTALS	29	2	8	39

Source: Competitive matches
