= 2012 Slovak Cup final =

2012 Slovnaft Cup final
- Event: 2011–12 Slovak Cup
Senica	Žilina
2	3
- Date: 8 May 2012
- Venue: Mestský štadión Bardejov, Bardejov
- Referee: Ľubomír Samotný
- Attendance: 3,000

The 2012 Slovnaft Cup final will be the final match of the 2011–12 Slovak Cup, the 43rd season of the top cup competition in Slovak football. The match was played at the Mestský štadión Bardejov in Bardejov on 8 May 2012 between FK Senica and MŠK Žilina. MŠK Žilina won after the match ended 3–2 after extra time.

== Road to the final ==
FK Senica		Round	MŠK Žilina
Opponent	Result	2011–12 Slovak Cup	Opponent	Result
FK Považská Bystrica	2–1	Second Round	FK Spišská Nová Ves	5–0
Baník Ružiná	3−0	Third Round	FK Poprad	0–0 (4–3 pen.)
Slovan Bratislava	2–0, 0–2 (4–2 pen.)	Quarter-finals	Tatran Prešov	2–1, 1–2 (5–4 pen.)
ViOn Zlaté Moravce	1–1, 3–0	Semi-finals	Dukla Banská Bystrica	1–0, 0–0

== Match ==
=== Details ===
8 May 2012
12:30 CEST

Senica	2–3 (a.e.t.)	Žilina
Kóňa 11', 73'	Report	Majtán 7'; Barčík 49'; Deza 104'

Mestský štadión Bardejov, Bardejov
Attendance: 3,000
Referee: Ľubomír Samotný

FK Senica	MŠK Žilina

FK Senica:
GK	26	(Czech Republic) Petr Bolek (c)
RB	23	(Slovakia) Juraj Križko
CB	4	(Czech Republic) Petr Pavlík	(substituted off) 110'
CB	16	(Argentina) Nicolas Gorosito
LB	5	(Costa Rica) Pedro Leal
DM	12	(Netherlands) Stef Wijlaars
DM	2	(Czech Republic) Tomáš Strnad
CM	6	(Slovakia) Tomáš Kóňa
RW	9	(Slovakia) Martin Ďurica	(yellow card) 44'	(substituted off) 101'
LW	14	(Czech Republic) Jaroslav Diviš
FW	7	(Panama) Rolando Blackburn	(substituted off) 71'
Substitutes:
GK	18	(Slovakia) Pavel Kamesch
DF	21	(Slovakia) Marián Štrbák
AM	10	(Czech Republic) Jaroslav Černý	(substituted on) 101'
LW	20	(Brazil) Bolinha	(substituted on) 110'
FW	25	(Slovakia) Michal Vilkovský
FW	13	(Ivory Coast) Lamine Diarrassouba	(substituted on) 71'
Manager:
(Slovakia) Stanislav Griga

MŠK Žilina:
GK	22	(Slovakia) Martin Krnáč
RB	45	(Cameroon) Ernest Mabouka	(substituted off) 46'
CB	15	(Slovakia) Jozef Piaček
CB	7	(Slovakia) Vladimír Leitner	(yellow card) 54'
LB	77	(Portugal) Ricardo Nunes
DM	12	(Slovakia) Viktor Pečovský
RM	20	(Slovakia) Peter Šulek	(substituted off) 78'
CM	11	(Slovakia) Miroslav Barčík (c)	(yellow card) 112'
LM	17	(Slovakia) Róbert Pich
FW	10	(Slovakia) Tomáš Majtán
FW	14	(Slovakia) Ján Novák	(substituted off) 81'
Substitutes:
GK	33	(Slovakia) Matej Rakovan
RB	2	(Slovakia) Stanislav Angelovič	(substituted on) 46'
CB	5	(Togo) Serge Akakpo
CB	25	(Slovakia) Miroslav Minarčík
CM	3	(Slovakia) Milan Škriniar
CM	9	(Slovakia) Roman Gergel	(substituted on) 78'
LW	24	(Peru) Jean Deza	(substituted on) 81'
Manager:
(Netherlands) Frans Adelaar

Assistant referees:
(Slovakia) Erik Weiss
(Slovakia) Miroslav Benko
Fourth official:
(Slovakia) Kamil Horváth
