= 2012–13 Slovak Cup =

2012–13 Slovak cup
Slovnaft cup

Tournament details
- Country: Slovakia
- Teams: 43

Final positions
- Champions: Slovan Bratislava
- Runners-up: MŠK Žilina

Tournament statistics
- Top goal scorer(s): 5 goals: Róbert Pich (Žilina)

The 2012–13 Slovak Cup, also known as Slovnaft Cup for sponsorship reasons, was the 44th edition of the competition. 43 clubs participated in the tournament. The winners of the competition, ŠK Slovan Bratislava, as the 2013–14 Slovak First Football League champion qualified for the second qualifying round of the 2013–14 UEFA Champions League. The Slovak Cup runner-up team, MŠK Žilina, qualified for the first qualifying round of the 2013–14 UEFA Europa League.

== Participating teams ==
Corgoň Liga (12 teams)

(all teams received a bye to the 2nd round)

- AS Trenčín
- Spartak Myjava
- Dukla Banská Bystrica
- MFK Košice
- FC Nitra
- MFK Ružomberok
- FK Senica
- Slovan Bratislava
- Spartak Trnava
- 1. FC Tatran Prešov
- ViOn Zlaté Moravce
- MŠK Žilina

2. liga (11 teams)

- MFK Dubnica
- Partizán Bardejov
- Baník Ružiná (bye to the 2nd round)
- Tatran Liptovský Mikuláš
- SFM Senec (bye to the 2nd round)
- ŠTK Šamorín
- Zemplín Michalovce
- MŠK Rimavská Sobota
- DAC Dunajská Streda (bye to the 2nd round)
- Šport Podbrezová
- Slovan Duslo Šaľa

Keno 10 3. liga (17 teams)

- Slovan Nemšová
- FK Pohronie
- FKM Nové Zámky
- OFK Dunajská Lužná
- OTJ Moravany
- PFK Piešťany
- ŠKF Sereď
- FC Petržalka 1898
- FK Moldava
- FK Poprad
- Fomat Martin
- AFC Nové Mesto (bye to the 2nd round)
- LP Domino (bye to the 2nd round)
- MŠK Námestovo (bye to the 2nd round)
- Odeva Lipany (bye to the 2nd round)
- Lokomotíva Košice (bye to the 2nd round)

Majstrovstvá Regiónu (3 teams)

- FK Haniska
- Raven Považská Bystrica
- Baník Kalinovo (bye to the 2nd round)

== First round ==
7 August 2012	FC Petržalka 1898	3–1	FC ŠTK 1914 Šamorín	Petržalka
16:30	Hečko 62'; Gabura 70'; Tomšík 78'	Report	Gilewicz 2'; Borbély (yellow card) 77' (yellow-red card) 81'	Stadium: Stadium FC Petržalka 1898; Attendance: 245; Referee: Martin Dohál

7 August 2012	FK Pohronie	8–0	FKM Nové Zámky	Dolná Ždaňa
17:30	Pinka 2', 74'; Páleník 14', 49'; Sekereš 27' (pen.); Garaj 51'; Líška 73'; Sedláček 84'	Report		Stadium: Stadium Dolná Ždaňa; Attendance: 320; Referee: Anton Jánoš

7 August 2012	FK Haniska	1–2	Partizán Bardejov	Haniska
17:30	Horňák 75'	Report	Andraščík 56'; Cuprišin 62'	Stadium: Stadium FK Haniska; Attendance: 300; Referee: Erik Anguš

7 August 2012	FK Slovan Duslo Šaľa	0–0 (3–5 p)	FK Slovan Nemšová	Šaľa
17:30		Report		Stadium: Šaľa Stadium; Attendance: 200; Referee: Marek Špaček

7 August 2012	MŠK Rimavská Sobota	2–0	MFK Tatran Liptovský Mikuláš	Rimavská Sobota
17:30	Migaľa 48'; Nilaš 73'	Report		Stadium: Na Zahradkach Stadium; Attendance: 252; Referee: Igor Kozák

7 August 2012	FK LAFC Lučenec	0–0 (4–2 p)	MFK Zemplín Michalovce	Lučenec
17:30		Report		Stadium: Stadium Mestský; Attendance: 500; Referee: Roland Weiss

7 August 2012	OFK Dunajská Lužná	2–2 (5–4 p)	MFK Dubnica	Dunajská Lužná
17:30	Jackuliak 11', 18'	Report	Augustíni 66'; Šmahajčík 76'	Stadium: Stadium Dunajská Lužná; Attendance: 150; Referee: Peter Krivošík

7 August 2012	OTJ Moravany nad Váhom	2–1	PFK Piešťany	Moravany nad Váhom
17:30	Rusnák 50', 64'	Report	Gligić 84'; Moravčík (yellow card) 59' (yellow-red card) 66'	Stadium: Stadium Moravany; Attendance: 450; Referee: Slavomír Cifrík

7 August 2012	FK Bodva Moldava nad Bodvou	0–1	ŽP Šport Podbrezová	Moldava nad Bodvou
19:30	Palencsár (red card) 90'	Report	Szöke 21'	Stadium: Steel Slovakia aréna Attendance: 600; Referee: Ľuboš Kačenga

8 August 2012	FK Raven Považská Bystrica	0–2	ŠKF Sereď	Považská Bystrica
17:30		Report	Šnegoň 11'; Frťala 63'	Stadium: Stadium FK Raven; Attendance: 150; Referee: Roman Galád

22 August 2012	MŠK Fomat Martin	1–3	FK Poprad	Martin
17:30	Kollár 41'; Kačák (red card) 67'	Report	Bednarčík 2'; Compeľ 36'; Monka 76'	Stadium: Stadium MŠK Fomat Martin; Attendance: 300; Referee: Peter Korista

== Second round ==
28 August 2012	Lokomotíva Košice	1–1 (4–3 p)	Lučenec	Krásna nad Hornádom
17:00	Timkovič 8'	Report	Horváth 33'	Stadium: Stadium Krásna nad Hornádom; Attendance: 200; Referee: Michal Čiernik
	Penalties
	Keresteš (penalty scored); Szöllös (penalty scored); Biľ (penalty scored); Timkovič (penalty missed); Hloušek (penalty scored)		(penalty missed) Horváth; (penalty scored) Piskura; (penalty missed) Vuković; (penalty scored) Kantar; (penalty scored) Koliada

28 August 2012	FK Poprad	1–2	MFK Košice	Poprad
17:00	Pitoňák 89' (pen.)	Report	Bendík 46' (o.g.); Škutka 54'	Stadium: Stadium FK Poprad; Attendance: 2,150; Referee: Róbert Mojsej

28 August 2012	MŠK Námestovo	0–1	FK Dukla Banská Bystrica	Námestovo
17:00		Report	Ferenčík (red card) 76'; Pančík 78'	Stadium: Stadium MŠK; Attendance: 700; Referee: Marek Mastiš

28 August 2012	ŠK SFM Senec	0–4	ŠK Slovan Bratislava	Senec
17:30		Report	Hlohovský 25'; Gorosito 32'; Kopúnek 70'; Milinković 73'	Stadium: NTC Senec; Attendance: 1,650; Referee: Richard Trutz

28 August 2012	MFK Ružomberok	4–1	MŠK Rimavská Sobota	Ružomberok
17:30	Lupták 24'; Almaský 33'; Nagy 73'; Bartoš 80'	Report	Migaľa 69'	Stadium: MFK Ružomberok Stadium; Attendance: 1,068; Referee: Gabriel Michlian

28 August 2012	MŠK Žilina	2–0	TJ Baník Ružiná	Žilina
17:30	Pich 28', 50'	Report		Stadium: Stadium pod Dubňom; Attendance: 787; Referee: Miroslav Fajčík

28 August 2012	OFK Dunajská Lužná	0–2	Spartak Myjava	Dunajská Lužná
17:00		Report	Častulín 19'; Petráš 28'	Stadium: Stadium Dunajská Lužná; Attendance: 300; Referee: Ladislav Prešinský

28 August 2012	FK Slovan Nemšová	0–4	AS Trenčín	Nemšová
17:00		Report	Baéz 50'; Depetris 58', 60'; Čentéš 86'	Stadium: FK Slovan Stadium; Attendance: 550; Referee: Pavol Šuniar

28 August 2012	FC Petržalka 1898	0–3	FC Nitra	Petržalka
17:00		Report	Boszorád 25'; Soumah 74'; Šimonek 90'	Stadium: Stadium FC Petržalka 1898; Attendance: 365; Referee: Jozef Pavlík

28 August 2012	ŽP Šport Podbrezová	0–0 (4–5 p)	FC ViOn Zlaté Moravce	Podbrezová
16:00		Report		Stadium: Stadium Kolkáreň; Attendance: 860; Referee: Dušan Sedlák
	Penalties
	Pančík (penalty scored); Harvilko (penalty scored); Kupčík (penalty scored); Vaščak (penalty scored); Minčič (penalty missed)		(penalty scored) Bernáth; (penalty scored) Hodek; (penalty scored) Mihálik; (penalty scored) Škvarka; (penalty scored) Majerník

28 August 2012	Partizán Bardejov	3–0	ŠK Odeva Lipany	Bardejov
16:30	Cuprišin 44', 64'; Dupkala 51'	Report		Stadium: Stadium mestský Bardejov; Attendance: 450; Referee: Štefan Leško

28 August 2012	FK Senica	7–1	FK DAC 1904 Dunajská Streda	Senica
19:30	Huber 29' (o.g.); Černý 44'; Kalabiška 46'; Križko 53'; Varadi 74', 84'; Masaryk 83'	Report	Banovič 33'	Stadium: Stadium FK Senica; Attendance: 968; Referee: Roman Matúš

29 August 2012	OTJ Moravany nad Váhom	1–2	ŠKF Sereď	Moravany nad Váhom
17:00	Vajda 33'	Report	Filo 26', 72' (pen.)	Stadium: OTJ Moravany Stadium; Attendance: 250; Referee: Pavol Páchnik

29 August 2012	FK Pohronie	0–1	LP Domino	Dolná Ždaňa
17:00		Report	Gubančok 42'; Balko (red card) 84'	Stadium: Dolná Ždaňa Stadium; Attendance: 510; Referee: Rastislav Jurenka

29 August 2012	Baník Kalinovo	1–3	1. FC Tatran Prešov	Kalinovo
17:30	Melicher 56'	Report	Guba 5', 22'; Krajník 35' (pen.)	Stadium: Kalinovo Stadium; Attendance: 1,200; Referee: Michal Perašín

29 August 2012	FC Spartak Trnava	3–1	AFC Nové Mesto nad Váhom	Trnava
17:30	Karhan 43'; Gašparík 55'; Bicák 86'	Report	Gajdošík 12'	Stadium: Stadium Antona Malatinského; Attendance: 1,893; Referee: Boris Marhefka

== Third round ==
25 September 2012	Spartak Myjava	2–1	FC Nitra	Myjava
16:00	Šebek 12'; Sládek 67'	Report	Ivančík 54'	Stadium: Stadium Myjava; Attendance: 1,130; Referee: Vladimír Hracho

25 September 2012	ŠKF Sereď	2–3	Spartak Trnava	Sereď
16:30	Gál 41'; Filo 90'	Report	Ciprys 42'; Čarnota 78'; Gašparík 88'	Stadium: Stadium Sereď; Attendance: 1,500; Referee: Martin Ježík

25 September 2012	Dukla Banská Bystrica	4–1	Partizán Bardejov	Banská Bystrica
16:30	Hučko 26', 90'; Považanec 82'; Rejdovian 88'	Report	Andraščík 18'	Stadium: SNP Stadium; Attendance: 550; Referee: Július Straka

25 September 2012	Lokomotíva Košice	1–3	MFK Košice	Košice
17:00	Jurko 5'	Report	Novák 43' (pen.); Škutka 71', 91'	Stadium: Stadium Lokomotívy v Čermeli; Attendance: 3,650; Referee: Filip Glova

25 September 2012	MŠK Žilina	3–1	AS Trenčín	Žilina
17:30	Ceesay 11'; Pich 45', 63'	Report	Depetris 78'	Stadium: Stadium pod Dubňom; Attendance: 1,373; Referee: Michal Smolák

25 September 2012	Slovan Bratislava	3–2	FC ViOn Zlaté Moravce	Bratislava
18:00	Gorosito 6'; Milinković 66'; Peltier 75'	Report	Candrák 17'; Škvarka 53'	Stadium: Pasienky; Attendance: 553; Referee: Štefan Leško

26 September 2012	LP Domino	0–4	FK Senica	Bratislava
16:00		Report	Diviš 2'; Križko 15'; Frýdek 30'; Kóňa 89'	Stadium: Stadium Trnávka; Attendance: 500; Referee: Ladislav Prešinský

26 September 2012	1. FC Tatran Prešov	1–1 (3–4 p)	MFK Ružomberok	Prešov
16:30	Marcin 82'	Report	Mukendi 86'	Stadium: Tatran Stadium; Attendance: 1,140; Referee: Miroslav Jaška
	Penalties
	Krajník (penalty scored); Petráš (penalty scored); Marcin (penalty missed); Lipták (penalty scored); Zošák (penalty missed)		(penalty scored) Bielák; (penalty scored) Kotora; (penalty scored) Práznovský; (penalty missed) Greššák; (penalty scored) Nagy

== Quarter-finals ==
=== First legs ===
23 October 2012	FK Senica	1–2	MŠK Žilina	Senica
16:30	Diarrassouba 54'	Report	Nunes 62'; Pich 69'	Stadium: FK Senica stadium Attendance: 1,012; Referee: Michal Smolák

23 October 2012	Dukla Banská Bystrica	2–1	Spartak Trnava	Banská Bystrica
17:00	Pančík 82'; Hlinka 86'	Report	Karhan 80' (pen.)	Stadium: Štadión SNP Štiavničky; Attendance: 850; Referee: Ivan Kružliak

24 October 2012	MFK Košice	2–0	Spartak Myjava	Košice
16:00	Novák 31' (pen.); Duda 89'	Report		Stadium: Lokomotíva Stadium; Attendance: 860; Referee: Jan Valášek

24 October 2012	Slovan Bratislava	2–0	MFK Ružomberok	Bratislava
18:00	Peltier 10'; Hlohovský 55'	Report		Stadium: Pasienky stadium Attendance: 468; Referee: Petár Královič

=== Second legs ===
6 November 2012	MŠK Žilina	1–2 (3–3 agg.) (4−2 p)	FK Senica	Žilina
17:30	Ceesay 12'	Report	Blackburn 25'; Babic 41'	Stadium: Stadium Pod Dubňom; Attendance: 1,037; Referee: Richard Trutz
	Penalties
	Pich (penalty scored); Piaček (penalty scored); Škriniar (penalty scored); Angelovič (penalty scored)		(penalty missed) Ďurica; (penalty scored) Brabec; (penalty scored) Štepanovský; (penalty missed) Černý

6 November 2012	Spartak Trnava	3–1 (4–3 agg.)	Dukla Banská Bystrica	Trnava
17:00	Čarnota 8'; Vlasko 44'; Schranz 88'	Report	Brašeň 54'	Stadium: Štadión Antona Malatinského; Attendance: 2,278; Referee: Pavol Chmura

6 November 2012	Spartak Myjava	3–1 (3–3a agg.)	MFK Košice	Myjava
13:30	Harsányi 2'; Černáček 8'; Šebek 90'	Report	Bašista 10'	Stadium: Stadium Myjava; Attendance: 500; Referee: Kamil Horváth

6 November 2012	MFK Ružomberok	3–1 (3–3a agg.)	Slovan Bratislava	Ružomberok
16:30	Serečin 24'; Lovás 71', 89'	Report	Mészáros 34'	Stadium: MFK Ružomberok Stadium; Attendance: 1,024; Referee: Štefan Leško

== Semi-finals ==
=== First legs ===
9 April 2013	MFK Košice	0–3	Slovan Bratislava	Košice
16:30	Tofiloski (red card) 71'	Report	Milinković 48'; Halenár 73' (pen.); Grendel 90'	Stadium: Lokomotíva Stadium; Attendance: 2,950; Referee: Miroslav Jaška

9 April 2013	MŠK Žilina	3–2	Spartak Trnava	Žilina
16:30	Leitner 3'; Majtán 34'; Piaček 41'	Report	Vlasko 9'; Kaščák 81'	Stadium: Stadium Pod Dubňom; Attendance: 1,835; Referee: Jozef Pavlík

=== Second legs ===
16 April 2013	Slovan Bratislava	3–1 (6–1 agg.)	MFK Košice	Bratislava
17:30	Milinković 23'; Kuzma 32'; Žofčák 45' (pen.)	Report	Gál-Andrezly 20'; Duda (yellow card) 38' (yellow-red card) 58'	Stadium: Pasienky stadium Attendance: 1,066; Referee: Gabriel Michlian

16 April 2013	Spartak Trnava	1–1 (3–4 agg.)	MŠK Žilina	Trnava
16:30	Hodúr 52' (pen.)	Report	Leitner 49'	Stadium: Štadión Antona Malatinského; Attendance: 3,159; Referee: Vladimír Vnuk

== Final ==
1 May 2013
16:00 CEST

MŠK Žilina	0–2	Slovan Bratislava
	Report	Žofčák 27'; Peltier 49'

Štadión MFK Ružomberok, Ružomberok
Attendance: 3,410
Referee: Peter Kráľovič
