= 2013 Slovak Cup final =

2013 Slovnaft Cup final
- Event: 2012–13 Slovak Cup
Žilina	Slovan Bratislava
0	2
- Date: 1 May 2013
- Venue: Štadión MFK Ružomberok, Ružomberok
- Referee: (Slovakia) Peter Kráľovič
- Attendance: 3,410

The 2013 Slovnaft Cup final was the final match of the 2012–13 Slovak Cup, the 44th season of the top cup competition in Slovak football. The match was played at the Štadión MFK Ružomberok in Ružomberok on 1 May 2013 between MŠK Žilina and ŠK Slovan Bratislava. ŠK Slovan Bratislava won 2–0 and Slovan have a chance acquire double.

== Road to the final ==
MŠK Žilina		Round	ŠK Slovan Bratislava
Opponent	Result	2012–13 Slovak Cup	Opponent	Result
Baník Ružiná	2–0	Second Round	SFM Senec	4–0
AS Trenčín	3−1	Third Round	ViOn Zlaté Moravce	3–2
FK Senica	2–1, 1–2 (4–2 pen.)	Quarter-finals	MFK Ružomberok	2–0, 1–3
Spartak Trnava	3–2, 1–1	Semi-finals	MFK Košice	3–0, 3–1

== Match ==
=== Details ===
1 May 2013
16:00 CEST

MŠK Žilina	0–2	Slovan Bratislava
	Report	Žofčák 27'; Peltier 49'

Štadión MFK Ružomberok, Ružomberok
Attendance: 3,410
Referee: Peter Kráľovič

MŠK Žilina	ŠK Slovan Bratislava

GK	22	(Slovakia) Martin Krnáč
RB	45	(Cameroon) Ernest Mabouka
CB	15	(Slovakia) Jozef Piaček
CB	7	(Slovakia) Vladimír Leitner
LB	77	(South Africa) Ricardo Nunes
DM	5	(Togo) Serge Akakpo
RM	17	(Slovakia) Róbert Pich	(substituted off) 80'
CM	20	(Slovakia) Michal Škvarka	(substituted off) 55'
CM	29	(Slovakia) Jakub Paur	(substituted off) 55'
LM	10	(Slovakia) Miroslav Barčík (c)
FW	21	(Slovakia) Tomáš Majtán
Substitutes:
GK	89	(Slovakia) Patrik Le Giang
DF	2	(Slovakia) Stanislav Angelovič
RM	4	(Slovakia) Peter Lupčo	(substituted in) 80'
RW	11	(Slovakia) Dávid Guba	(substituted in) 55'
CM	14	(Benin) Babatounde Bello	(substituted in) 55'
Manager:
Štefan Tarkovič

GK	1	(Slovakia) Pavel Kováč
RB	18	(Ivory Coast) Mamadou Bagayoko
CB	16	(Argentina) Nicolas Gorosito
CB	21	(Slovakia) Kristián Kolčák
LB	25	(Slovakia) Lukáš Pauschek
DM	17	(Czech Republic) Jiří Kladrubský	(substituted off) 72'
DM	8	(Slovakia) Erik Grendel
RW	10	(Slovakia) Igor Žofčák (c)
LW	11	(Serbia) Marko Milinković	(substituted off) 80'
AM	20	(Guinea) Seydouba Soumah	(substituted off) 73'
FW	23	(Trinidad and Tobago) Lester Peltier
Substitutes:
GK	30	(Slovakia) Matúš Putnocký
DF	2	(Slovakia) Filip Lukšík
DF	3	(Slovakia) Branislav Niňaj
LW	7	(Slovakia) Filip Hlohovský
CF	9	(Slovakia) Juraj Halenár	(substituted in) 73'
DM	14	(Slovakia) Kamil Kopúnek	(substituted in) 72'
CF	26	(Slovakia) Marek Kuzma	(substituted in) 80'
Manager:
Samuel Slovák

Assistant referees:
(Slovakia) Radomír Sluk
(Slovakia) Martin Vindiš
Fourth official:
(Slovakia) Dušan Kubačka
Additional assistant referees:
(Slovakia) Vladimír Vnuk
(Slovakia) Mário Vlk
