= Jean Paul Ntsogo Boya =

Cameroonian footballer

Jean Paul Boya
Personal information
- Full name: Jean Paul Ntsogo Boya
- Date of birth: September 23, 1984 (age 42)
- Place of birth: Yaoundé, Cameroon
- Height: 1.77 m (5 ft 10 in)
- Position: Midfielder

Team information
- Current team: Veľký Meder
- Number: 18

Senior career*
Years	Team	Apps	(Gls)
2000–2002	Victoria Shooting Star	25	(3)
2002–2003	Sahel FC	9	(0)
2003–2004	Cotonsport Garoua	20	(0)
2004–2008	Jeunesse Star Yaoundé	86	(14)
2008–2014	Dunajská Streda	122	(1)
2015–2016	TJ Družstevník Trstice		
2016	OFK Rapid Ohrady		
2016–2018	Thermál Veľký Meder		
2018	OŠK Svätý Peter		
2019–	NAFC Veľké Blahovo		
- * Club domestic league appearances and goals as of 21 February 2020

Jean Paul Ntsogo Boya (born 23 September 1984) is a Cameroonian footballer who currently plays for Thermál Veľký Meder.
