= Martin Poleť =

Slovak footballer

Personal information
- Full name: Martin Poleť
- Date of birth: 31 August 1990 (age 36)
- Place of birth: Terchová, Czechoslovakia
- Height: 1.74 m (5 ft 8 1/2 in)
- Position: Right back

Team information
- Current team: Rimavská Sobota (on loan from Žilina)
- Number: 9

Youth career
- Žilina

Senior career*
| Years | Team | Apps | (Gls) |
| 2010– | Žilina | 6 | (0) |
| 2011 | →FK Bodva (loan) | 13 | (0) |
| 2012– | →Rimavská Sobota (loan) | 32 | (0) |

International career^{‡}
| 2008 | Slovakia U-19 | 6 | (0) |
| 2010– | Slovakia U-21 | 4 | (0) |
- * Club domestic league appearances and goals as of 13 April 2013 ‡ National team caps and goals as of 9 May 2011

Martin Poleť (born 31 August 1990) is a Slovak footballer who plays as a defender for MŠK Rimavská Sobota, on loan from MŠK Žilina and the Slovakia national under-21 football team.
