= Nicolás Gorosito =

Argentine footballer

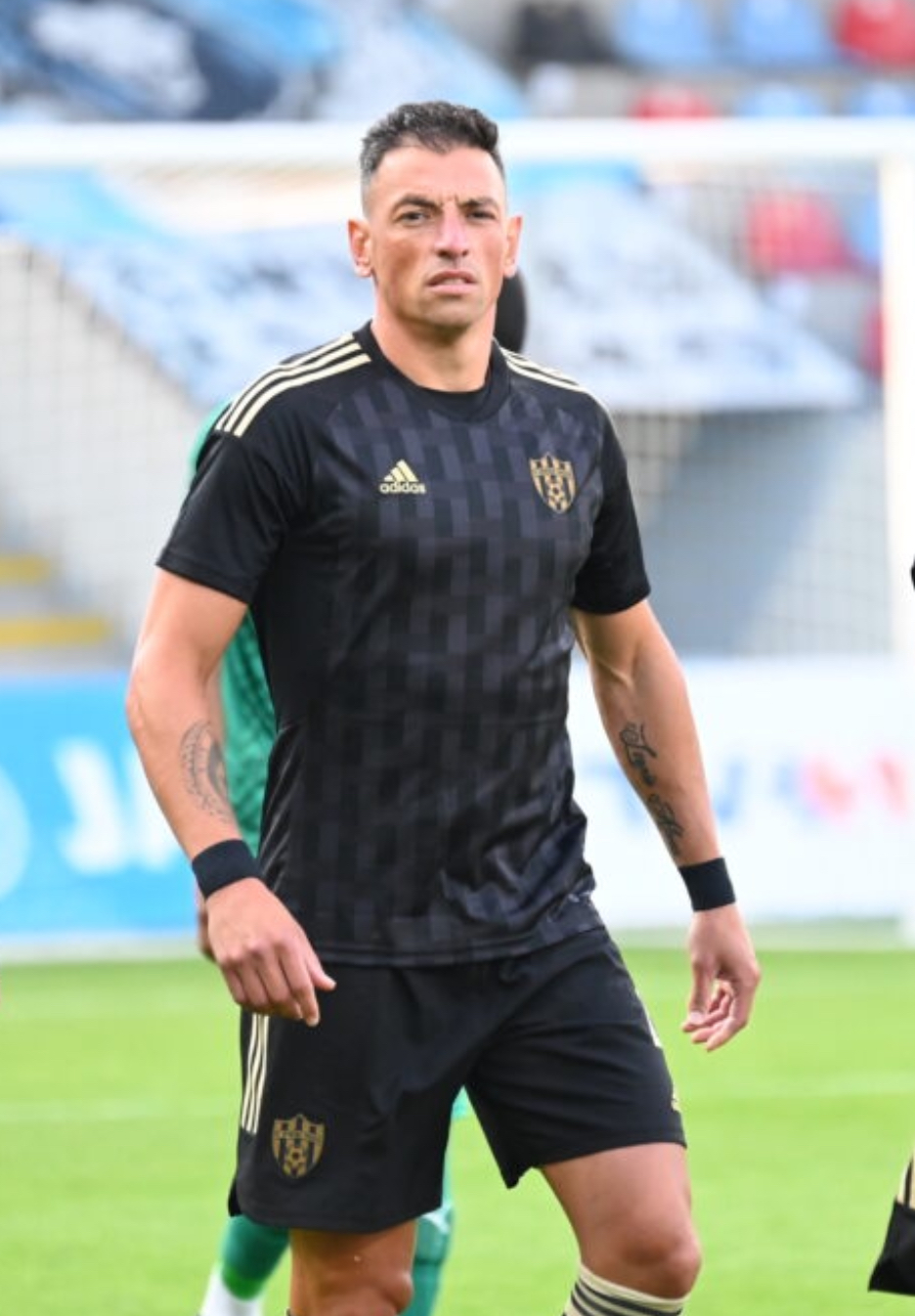
- Gorosito with Spartak Trnava in 2023

Personal information
- Full name: Nicolás Ezequiel Gorosito
- Date of birth: 17 August 1988 (age 38)
- Place of birth: Santa Fe, Argentina
- Height: 1.86 m (6 ft 1 in)
- Position: Centre-back

Team information
- Current team: Dynamo Malženice
- Number: 4

Youth career
- 2006: Independiente de Tandil

Senior career*
Years	Team	Apps	(Gls)
2007–2010	Ben Hur	37	(0)
2010	Independiente de Tandil	32	(1)
2010–2011	Sportivo Belgrano	24	(0)
2011–2012	Senica	45	(4)
2012–2016	Slovan Bratislava	99	(7)
2016–2018	Getafe	25	(1)
2018–2021	Albacete	58	(1)
2021–2022	Alcorcón	24	(2)
2023	Dukla Banská Bystrica	13	(1)
2023	Spartak Trnava	5	(0)
2024–2025	FC Košice	22	(1)
2025–2026	České Budějovice	11	(0)
2026–	Dynamo Malženice	12	(0)
- * Club domestic league appearances and goals as of 25 May 2026

Nicolás Ezequiel Gorosito (born 17 August 1988) is an Argentine footballer who plays for Slovak 2. Liga club Dynamo Malženice as a centre back.

Gorosito is fluent in the Slovak language.

== Club career ==
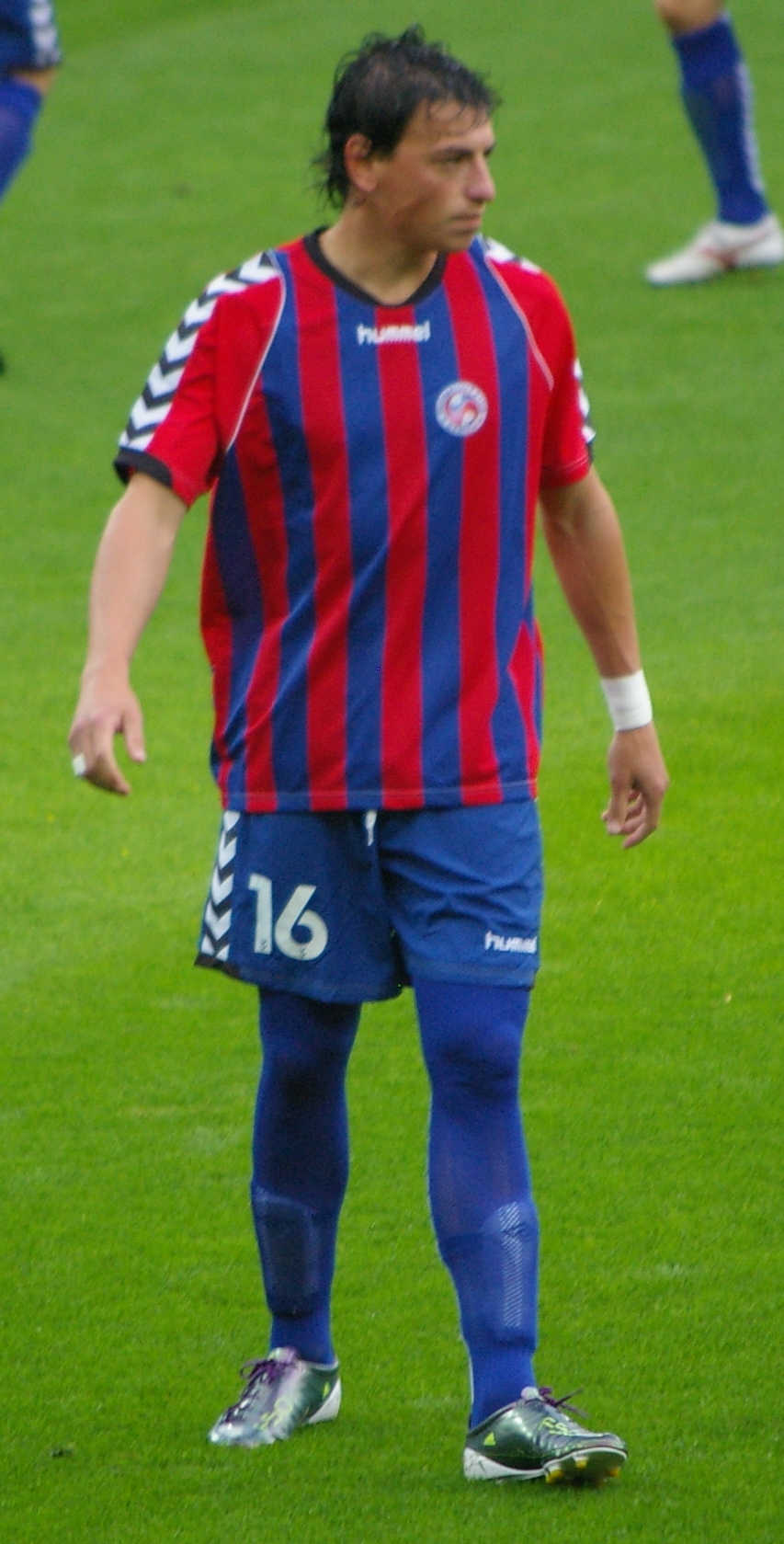
Gorosito with FK Senica in 2011

=== Early career ===
Born in Santa Fe, Gorosito joined Ben Hur in 2007 from Independiente de Tandil. After making his professional debut in the 2007–08 season in Primera B Nacional (also suffering relegation), he returned to the latter club in 2010.

=== Slovakia ===
In 2011, after a short spell with Sportivo Belgrano, Gorosito moved abroad for the first time in his career, after agreeing to a contract with Corgoň liga club Senica. He made his debut for the club on 26 February, in a 3–0 home win against Dukla Banská Bystrica.

Gorosito scored his first goal abroad on 23 July 2011, but in a 3–2 away loss against Slovan Bratislava. On 18 June 2012, he completed a move to the latter club for an undisclosed fee, on a four-year contract.

=== Getafe ===
On 14 June 2016, free agent Gorosito signed a one-year deal with Getafe in Segunda División. On 8 July 2017, after contributing with one goal in 27 appearances as his side achieved promotion to La Liga, he renewed his contract for a further season.

=== Albacete ===
On 13 January 2018, after making no league appearances during the first half of the campaign, Gorosito signed an 18-month contract with Albacete in the second division. He left the club in 2021, after suffering relegation.

=== Alcorcón ===
On 25 July 2021, Gorosito agreed to a deal with AD Alcorcón, also in the Spanish second division.

=== FC Spartak Trnava ===
In the summer of 2013, Gorosito joined FC Spartak Trnava, as Spartak needed an experienced defender before starting in the Conference League after the long-term injury of their main central defender Lukáš Štetina. Gorosito debuted for Spartak in a 1–1 draw against FK Auda in the 1st round of the Conference league. He made his league debut in a 2–1 loss against AS Trenčín. Gorosito would play in the play-offs to the group stages of the Conference League against SC Dnipro-1 in Košice. Although he scored an own goal in the 61st minute, Spartak would win 3–2 on aggregate after a goal by Martin Bukata in the 106th minute. Altogether, the thirty-five-year-old footballer would play four matches in the preliminary rounds of the Conference League in the Trnava jersey during the autumn. He managed to play one match in the group stage in Bulgaria against Ludogorets, getting injured and being subbed off at halftime. He played five matches for Trnava in the league and one in the Slovak Cup. In the winter of 2024, he joined fellow league outfit FC Košice.

=== Dynamo České Budějovice ===
On 4 February 2025, Gorosito signed a contract with Czech club Dynamo České Budějovice until June 2026.

=== Dynamo Malženice ===
In February 2026, Gorosito signed a contract with Dynamo Malženice until end of the season.

== Honours ==
=== Club ===
Slovan Bratislava

- Slovak First Football League: 2012–13, 2013–14
- Slovak Cup: 2012–13
