= Prince Ofori =

Beninese football central defender (born 1988)

Personal information
- Full name: Prince Ofori Yartey
- Date of birth: 6 October 1988 (age 38)
- Place of birth: Accra, Ghana
- Height: 1.83 m (6 ft 0 in)
- Positions: Centre back; defensive midfielder

Team information
- Current team: TJ Slovan Brvnište
- Number: 17

Youth career
- Chance for Children Academy
- Liberty Professionals
- 2002–2004: Soleil

Senior career*
Years	Team	Apps	(Gls)
2005–2006	Soleil		
2006–2012	Žilina	12	(0)
2010	→ Petržalka (loan)	15	(0)
2013	Petržalka	15	(0)
2014	Karviná	9	(1)
2015	Stráža	24	(4)
2016–	TJ Slovan Brvnište	109	(3)
- * Club domestic league appearances and goals as of 2 June 2020

Prince Ofori Yartey (born 6 October 1988) is a retired Beninese football central defender who plays for TJ Slovan Brvnište.

He is fluent in Slovak.

== Club career ==
The Ghanaian born defender began his senior career with Liberty Professionals in the Ghanaian Premier League at age seventeen. He signed for Slovak club MŠK Žilina in July 2006. He made his Corgoň Liga debut in the 3–0 away win against Spartak Trnava on 3 October 2006, coming off the bench as a substitute in the 90th minute. Then he was injured at winter training camp. Prince broke the cruciate ligament on knee and had to undergo three surgeries. He returned against Tatran Prešov on 5 December 2009. He joined FC Petržalka 1898 on loan for first half of the 2010–11 season and overall played 15 games. In January 2011, he was returned to Žilina.

=== After football ===
At the beginning of the 2022–23 season, Ofori returned to MŠK Žilina as assistant coach to Jaroslav Hynek. He also worked with the youth team, his task was to help African players with adaptation.
