= Ján Marcin =

Slovak footballer

Personal information
- Full name: Ján Marcin
- Date of birth: 7 September 1985 (age 41)
- Place of birth: Czechoslovakia
- Height: 1.92 m (6 ft 3 1/2 in)
- Position: Centre back

Team information
- Current team: ŠK 1923 Gabčíkovo
- Number: 18

Youth career
- MFK Zemplín Michalovce

Senior career*
Years	Team	Apps	(Gls)
- MFK Zemplín Michalovce
–2008	FC Senec	40	(2)
2008–2011	DAC Dunajská Streda	25	(2)
2011	→ MFK Zemplín Michalovce (loan)	10	(0)
2011–2012	DAC Dunajská Streda	22	(0)
2013	Sisaket FC	2	(0)
2013–2014	Paknampho NSRU F.C.		
2014–2015	Bernolákovo		
2015	Dunajská Lužná	10	(0)
2016	Syrianska IF Kerburan		
2016–	Gabčíkovo		
- * Club domestic league appearances and goals as of 10 February 2016

Ján Marcin (born 7 September 1985) is a Slovak football defender who currently plays for ŠK 1923 Gabčíkovo.
