= Pavel Kamesch =

Slovak footballer

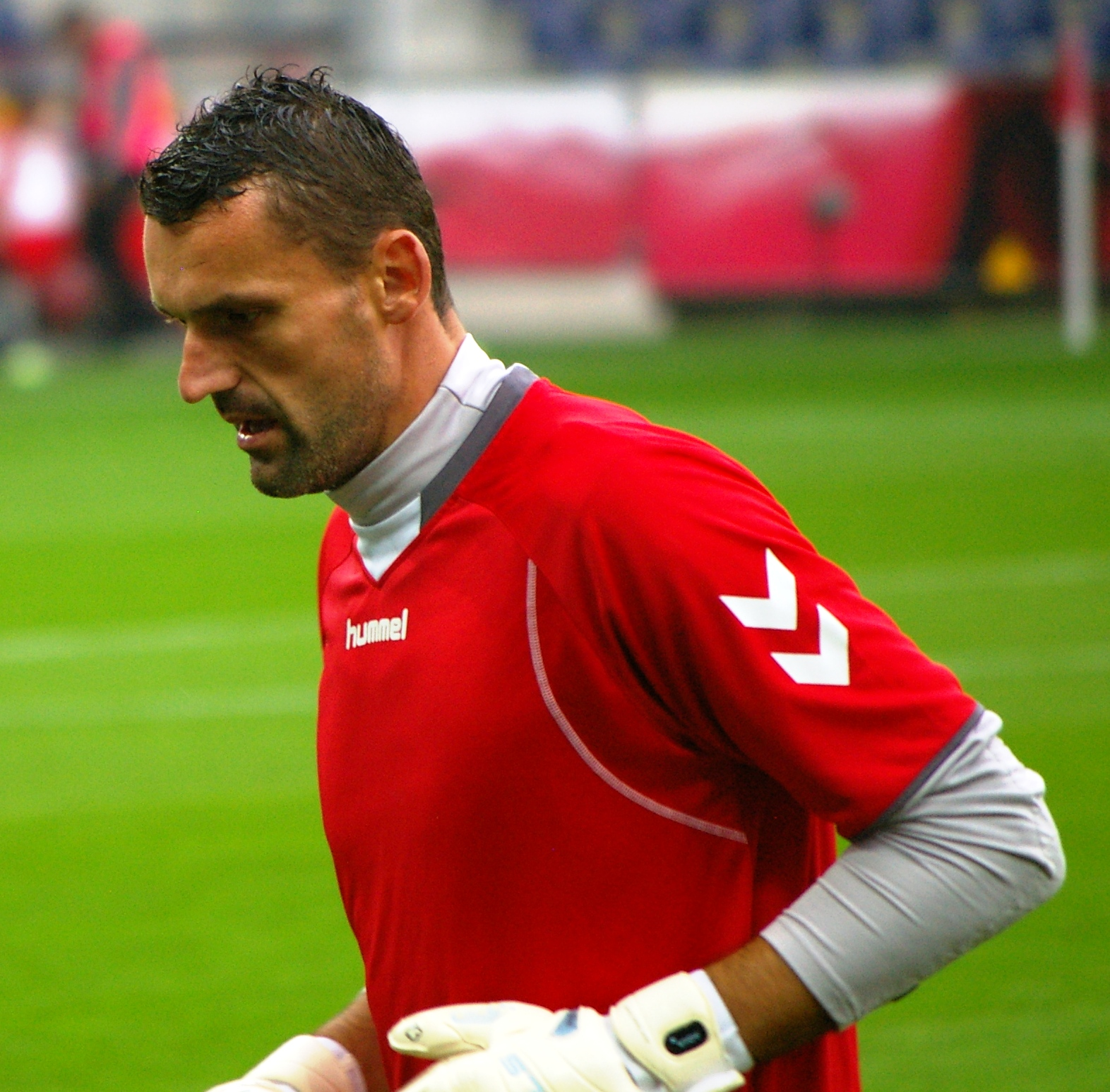
- Kamesch with Senica (2011)

Personal information
- Date of birth: 9 December 1974 (age 51)
- Place of birth: Banská Bystrica, Czechoslovakia
- Height: 1.92 m (6 ft 4 in)
- Position: Goalkeeper

Youth career
- Dukla Banská Bystrica

Senior career*
Years	Team	Apps	(Gls)
1994–1995	Dukla Banská Bystrica	2	(0)
1997–1998	1. FC Košice	8	(0)
1999–2000	SFM Senec	26	(0)
2000–2001	Sigma Olomouc	23	(0)
2001–2005	Enosis Neon Paralimni	90	(0)
2005–2006	AE Paphos		
2007–2008	Spartak Trnava	27	(0)
2008–2009	ENTHOI Lakatamia FC		
2009–2014	Senica	24	(0)
- * Club domestic league appearances and goals

Pavel Kamesch (born 9 December 1974) is a former Slovak football goalkeeper and goalkeeping coach.

== Club career ==
Pavel Kamesch is a former long-time football goalkeeper, most recently playing for FK Senica.

Outside Slovakia, he played in the Czech Republic and Cyprus. He began his football career at his hometown club FK Dukla Banská Bystrica. He played there until 1995, when he was scouted by MFK Košice, for whom he played in 1997–1998.

In 1999, he played for ŠK SFM Senec. After a year, he transferred to SK Sigma Olomouc, which was his first foreign club. He played the longest at Enosis Neon Paralimni, where he played for 4 seasons. He then transferred to AEP Pafos and in 2007 returned to Slovakia, this time to FC Spartak Trnava.

Then he went to the Cypriot club ENTHOI Lakatamia for his last foreign assignment.

== Coaching career ==
He currently works at FC Spartak Trnava as a goalkeeper coach. Kamesch came to the club in the winter of 2016. He was heavily involved in the transfer of Žiga Frelih.
