= Marcel Ondráš =

Slovak footballer

Personal information
- Full name: Marcel Ondráš
- Date of birth: 21 September 1985 (age 41)
- Place of birth: Dolná Súča, Czechoslovakia
- Height: 1.78 m (5 ft 10 in)
- Positions: Left back; centre-back

Senior career*
Years	Team	Apps	(Gls)
2004–2010	Dubnica		
2007–2008	→ Lučenec (loan)		
2010–2013	Žilina	16	(1)
2013	→ Zlaté Moravce (loan)	11	(0)
2013	→ Dubnica (loan)	14	(1)
2014	Polonia Bytom	14	(2)
2014	Borčice	10	(3)
2015	SV St. Martin		
2015–2017	Spartak Bánovce		
2017	FC Fastav Vsetín		
- * Club domestic league appearances and goals

Marcel Ondráš (born 21 September 1985) is a Slovak former professional footballer who played as a defender.

== Honours ==
Žilina

- Slovak First Football League: 2011–12
- Slovak Cup: 2011–12
