= Lukáš Migaľa =

Slovak footballer

Personal information
- Full name: Lukáš Migaľa
- Date of birth: 4 July 1990 (age 36)
- Place of birth: Hnúšťa, Czechoslovakia
- Height: 1.76 m (5 ft 9 in)
- Position: Right back

Team information
- Current team: Dukla Banská Bystrica
- Number: 21

Youth career
- FK Iskra Hnúšťa
- Rimavská Sobota

Senior career*
| Years | Team | Apps | (Gls) |
| –2014 | Rimavská Sobota | | |
| 2015–2018 | Železiarne Podbrezová | 12 | (1) |
| 2018– | Dukla Banská Bystrica | 175 | (4) |
- * Club domestic league appearances and goals as of 25 May 2026

Lukáš Migaľa (born 4 July 1990) is a Slovak footballer who currently plays for MFK Dukla Banská Bystrica as a right back.

He has played over 120 games in the Slovak First Football League.

== Club career ==
=== Early career ===
In 2013, Migaľa was a part of the MŠK Rimavská Sobota squad. The 22-year-old went to Czech second league club 1. SC Znojmo on a trial in 2013. However, he did not settle in the Czech Republic and later returned to MŠK. Later that year he also went on trials to newly promoted side FK Třinec.

=== Podbrezová ===
Migaľa made his Slovak First Football League debut against DAC Dunajská Streda on 7 March 2015, being booked with a yellow card in the 66th minute. He would score his first and only goal for Podbrezová in a 2–1 defeat to eventual league winners ŠK Slovan Bratislava.

=== Dukla Banská Bystrica ===
In the summer of 2018, Migaľa joined fellow league side outfit FK Dukla Banská Bystrica. He made his debut in a 2–0 loss against MFK Zemplín Michalovce, playing the whole game. He also played the majority of the game in a historic 2–1 win against FC Spartak Trnava. In 2024, Migaľa signed a one year-extension to his contract with Dukla.
