= Martin Jackuliak =

Slovak footballer

Personal information
- Full name: Martin Jackuliak
- Date of birth: 13 September 1991 (age 35)
- Place of birth: Rimavská Sobota, Czechoslovakia
- Position: Midfielder

Youth career
- TJ ŠK Tempus Rimavská Sobota
- 2006–2010: Slovan Bratislava

Senior career*
| Years | Team | Apps | (Gls) |
| 2011–2012 | Dunajská Lužná | ? | (?) |
| 2013 | Nitra | 5 | (0) |
| 2013–2016 | Dunajská Lužná | ? | (?) |
| 2016–2017 | Sereď | 32 | (3) |
| 2017– | Lokomotíva Zvolen | 15 | (3) |
- * Club domestic league appearances and goals as of 24 November 2017

Martin Jackuliak (born 13 September 1991) is a Slovak football midfielder who currently plays for MFK Lokomotíva Zvolen.

== Early career ==
He made his Corgoň Liga debut for Nitra against FC Spartak Trnava, on 2 March 2013. Nitra lost this match 0-2.
