= Steel Slovakia aréna =

Stadium in Slovakia

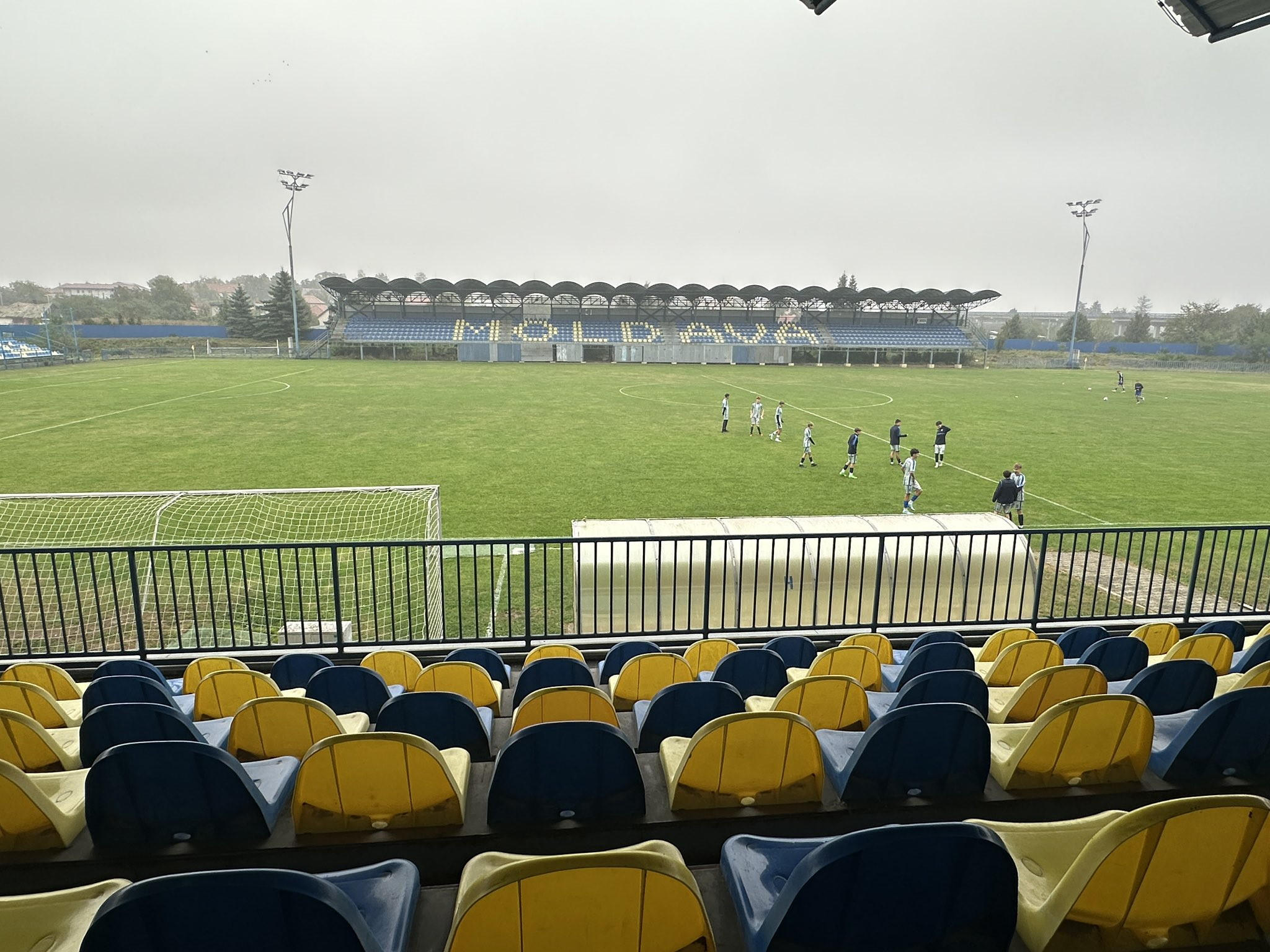
- Interactive map of Steel Slovakia aréna
- Location: Moldava nad Bodvou, Slovakia
- Coordinates: 48°36.23′N 21°0.1′E
- Operator: FK Bodva Moldava nad Bodvou
- Capacity: 2,500
- Surface: Grass
- Field size: 107 x 66 m

Tenants
- FK Bodva Moldava nad Bodvou (–2016); FC Košice B (2025-present)

Steel Slovakia aréna is a multi-use stadium in Moldava nad Bodvou, Slovakia. It is currently used mostly for football matches and was the home ground of FK Bodva Moldava nad Bodvou. The stadium holds 2,500 people.

The stadium is currently used by MŠK Moldava nad Bodvou and it’s B team.

The stadium was reconstructed in 2008. It was expected that FK Bodva Moldava nad Bodvou would be playing in the first division by that time, however, due to financial troubles the club had to be relegated from the 2. Liga, with the stadium falling into bad condition.

== History ==
=== 2008 reconstruction ===
A new stadium in Moldava nad Bodvou was constructed using the existing athletic facility. The construction began in 2008. The eastern and northern stands were erected using steel prefabricated materials and were notably positioned between the old landfill terracing and the playing field. In contrast, the primary western grandstand incorporates sections of the former structure that previously occupied the site, albeit with expansions and a new roof covering.

=== Recent years ===
After the demise of the football club FK Bodva Moldava nad Bodvou, the renovated stadium became barely used. The stadium serves the local club MŠK and its youth teams up to the U19 category.
