= Jean Deza =

Peruvian footballer (born 1993)

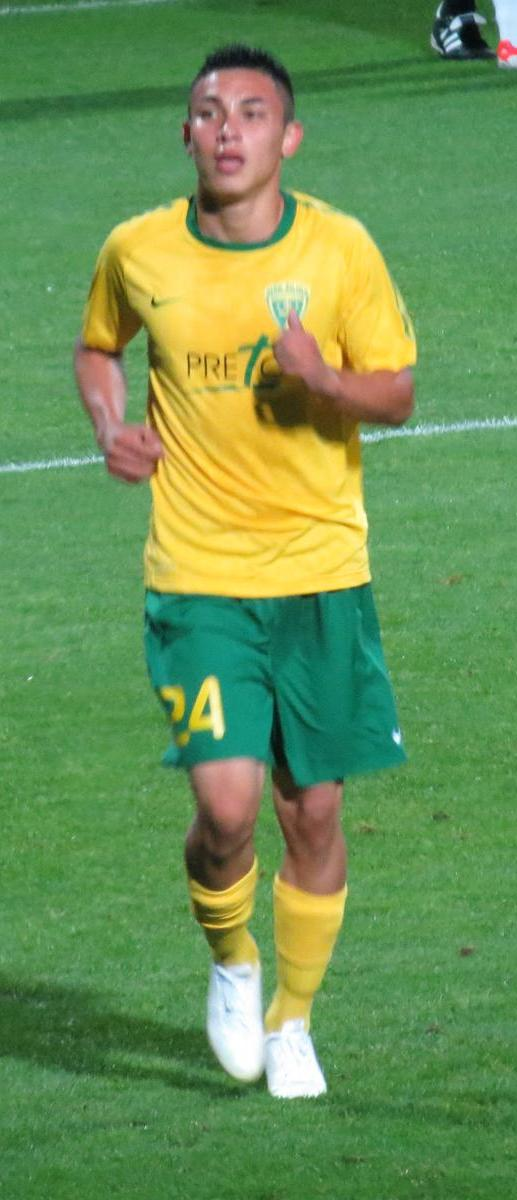

Personal information
- Full name: Jean Carlos Francisco Deza Sánchez
- Date of birth: 9 June 1993 (age 33)
- Place of birth: Callao, Peru
- Height: 1.75 m (5 ft 9 in)
- Position: Winger

Team information
- Current team: Santos de Nasca
- Number: 10

Youth career
- 2004–2009: Academia Cantolao
- 2010: Boca Juniors
- 2010: Lanús
- 2011: Freiburg
- 2011: Basel

Senior career*
Years	Team	Apps	(Gls)
2011–2012	Žilina	31	(3)
2013–2014	Universidad San Martín	10	(1)
2013–2014	→ Montpellier (loan)	12	(1)
2014–2016	Montpellier	9	(0)
2015	→ Alianza Lima (loan)	5	(0)
2016–2017	Levski Sofia	10	(0)
2017	Sport Rosario	0	(0)
2018	Sport Huancayo	10	(1)
2019	UTC	32	(6)
2020	Alianza Lima	3	(0)
2020	Deportivo Binacional	16	(1)
2021	Cultural Santa Rosa	0	(0)
2021	Carlos Stein	16	(5)
2022	Unión Huaral	0	(0)
2022	ADT	24	(5)
2023	Cienciano	6	(0)
2023	Alianza Universidad	8	(0)
2024	Alianza Atlético	1	(0)
2024	Sport Huancayo	11	(2)
2025	ADC Juan Pablo II College	0	(0)
2025-	Santos de Nasca	16	(4)

International career
2013–2014	Peru U20	6	(1)
2014–2015	Peru	6	(0)
- * Club domestic league appearances and goals as of 15 February 2020

Jean Deza (born 9 June 1993) is a Peruvian footballer who plays as a winger for Peruvian club Santos de Nasca.

== Career ==
=== Žilina ===
In August 2011, he joined Slovak club Žilina on a four-year contract. His debut came on 27 August 2011 in the Corgoň Liga match against Dukla Banská Bystrica, entering in as a substitute in place of Roman Gergel. Jean Deza was linked to Argentinian club Boca Juniors, and Swiss Basel before joining his present club.

=== Montpellier ===
In August 2013, he joined French club Montpellier on loan for one year.

=== Levski Sofia ===
In May 2016, Deza joined Bulgarian club Levski Sofia on a two-year deal. On 7 February 2017, he terminated his contract with the club after not showing up at Levski's winter training camp. Because of that, the player and the club had resolved the argument with the help of FIFA.

== International career ==
After some impressive performances for Montpellier, Jean Deza was called up for a friendly against England for England's World Cup 2014 warm up games. He started the game, putting in an impressive performance before later being substituted in the second half. The main highlight from Peru was when Deza tried to chip England's Joe Hart from 35 yards, only going over by a little.
