= David Střihavka =

Czech footballer (born 1983)

Personal information
- Date of birth: 4 March 1983 (age 43)
- Place of birth: Prague, Czechoslovakia
- Height: 1.91 m (6 ft 3 in)
- Position: Forward

Team information
- Current team: Sellier & Bellot Vlašim (manager)

Youth career
- 1989–1990: Junior Praha
- 1990–2000: Bohemians 1905
- 2000–2001: Sparta Prague

Senior career*
Years	Team	Apps	(Gls)
2001–2003	FK Jablonec	5	(0)
2003–2004	Bohemians Prague		
2004	Sparta Prague	2	(0)
2005	Chmel Blšany	21	(4)
2005–2007	Baník Ostrava	39	(15)
2007	Norwich City	10	(1)
2008	Slavia Prague	7	(1)
2008–2009	Baník Ostrava	20	(5)
2010–2011	Viktoria Plzeň	21	(5)
2011	→ Willem II Tilburg (loan)	11	(0)
2011–2012	MŠK Žilina	13	(1)
2012	→ Tatran Prešov (loan)	12	(1)
2012–2013	1. FK Příbram	26	(2)
2013–2014	Al-Ahed	1	(1)
2014	Banská Bystrica	17	(6)
2015	Racing Beirut	11	(6)
2015	Caratese	10	(2)

International career
1998–1999	Czech Republic U15	8	(1)
1999–2000	Czech Republic U16	15	(4)
2001	Czech Republic U17	6	(0)
2001–2002	Czech Republic U19	8	(2)

Managerial career
- Bohemians 1905 (U18)
- –2019: Slavia Prague (U19 assistant)
- 2019–2020: Slavia Prague B (assistant)
- 2020–?: Slavia Prague (U15)
- ?–: Slavia Prague (U17)
- 2023–2024: Slavia Prague B
- 2024–2025: Pardubice
- 2026–: Sellier & Bellot Vlašim
Medal record
Men's football
Representing Czech Republic
UEFA European Under-17 Championship
Runner-up	2000 Israel
- * Club domestic league appearances and goals

David Střihavka (born 4 March 1983) is a Czech professional football manager and former player who played as a forward.

Strihavka moved from Baník Ostrava to Norwich City in July 2007 and was the first Czech player to play for the club. Norwich terminated his contract on 11 January 2008. In June 2011 he joined to MŠK Žilina.

== Club career ==
=== In the Czech Republic ===
Střihavka played for many sides in his native country, including Bohemians Prague, Sparta Prague, FK Jablonec, Chmel Blšany and Banik Ostrava.

His career failed to get off the ground in the First Division and first made an impact in the Second Division with Bohemians Prague. This earned him a move to Sparta where he played in the 2004–05 Champions League with them.

=== Norwich City ===
On 11 July 2007, it was confirmed that Střihavka had signed for Norwich City for an undisclosed fee, reported to be around €1 million, on a four-year deal at a press conference at the team's Colney Training ground. He made his first appearance for Norwich on Saturday 14 July 2007, in a friendly match away at Exeter City, with the home team winning 2–1. Střihavka scored his first goal for Norwich City on Wednesday 25 July 2007, in a friendly match in the Netherlands against FC Zwolle, a game which the Canaries went on to lose 2–1.

Střihavka's first competitive goal came in Norwich's 1–0 win against Crystal Palace at Carrow Road on 15 September 2007, as he headed in a flick-on from Dion Dublin. He was booked for over-celebrating, as he jumped into the crowd. Střihavka was unable to add to his solitary goal for the club and failed to settle and establish himself in English football. His contract was terminated on 11 January 2008.

After leaving Norwich, Střihavka joined Czech league leaders Slavia Prague. His first game for them was in the UEFA Cup against Tottenham Hotspur, in which he scored his first goal for the club in a 2–1 defeat.

=== Tatran Prešov ===
Střihavka joined 1. FC Tatran Prešov in February 2012 on a half-year loan from MŠK Žilina.

== International career ==
Střihavka was part of the Czech Republic Under-16s that took part in UEFA Under-16 Championship in Israel in 2000, in which they were defeated by Portugal. Two years later in 2002, Střihavka played in the UEFA Under-19 Championship and scored twice against Andorra. He has not been selected for the senior Czech squad.

== Coaching career ==
Retiring due to a brain tumor at the end of 2015, Střihavka began his coaching at his former youth club, Bohemians 1905, where his little son also played. He then had a short spell at FK Meteor Prague VIII, before returning to Bohemians to coach the club's U18s.

After working with Slavia Prague's U19 team, he was promoted to assistant coach for the club's B-team in February 2019. In June 2020 it was confirmed, that he would be the head coach of Slavias' U15s for the new season.

== Honours ==
Viktoria Plzeň

- Czech Cup: 2010
