= Independiente de Tandil =

Argentine football club

- Full name: Club Independiente
- Founded: July 9, 1918
- Chairman: Horacio Morrone
- League: Torneo Argentino B
Home colours	Away colours

Club Independiente, more known as Independiente de Tandil, is an Argentine Football club, from the city of Tandil, in the Province of Buenos Aires. The team is currently playing in Zone F of the regionalised 4th level of Argentinian football Torneo Argentino B.

== History ==
A group formed by students (all of them sons of professionals, businesses and store keepers), decided to found the Independiente Football Boeing Club after a meeting. Since then, they used to meet in the restaurant "La Euskalduna", at that time located on the corner of San Martín and Alem streets in Tandil. The main objectives of that first group of founder members were to form a team and to choose the colors for the shirt and flag.

During the first years, the Club was moved to different locations, which were -in most cases- rent houses where the main activity was to add new members to the club. In 1928, Independiente acquired the house which would be the definitive location to the present.

== See also ==
- List of football clubs in Argentina
- Argentine football league system
