= Peter Šulek =

Slovak footballer

Personal information
- Full name: Peter Šulek
- Date of birth: 21 September 1988 (age 38)
- Place of birth: Detva, Czechoslovakia
- Height: 1.85 m (6 ft 1 in)
- Position: Midfielder

Team information
- Current team: USV Brand-Nagelberg
- Number: 17

Youth career
- TJ Kriváň
- 2003–2007: Banská Bystrica

Senior career*
Years	Team	Apps	(Gls)
2007–2008	Banská Bystrica	25	(2)
2009	Podbrezová	11	(0)
2009–2011	Dubnica	59	(4)
2011–2013	Žilina	19	(2)
2013–2014	Myjava	44	(5)
2014–2017	Vysočina Jihlava	50	(3)
2017–2018	Mezőkövesd	2	(0)
2017–2018	→ GKS Katowice (loan)	9	(0)
2018	→ Karviná (loan)	1	(0)
2019	→ Púchov (loan)		
2019	Blansko	12	(1)
2020–2023	ASV Schrems	44	(0)
2023–	USV Brand-Nagelberg	34	(12)

International career
2010	Slovakia U21	1	(0)
- * Club domestic league appearances and goals as of 09:43, 21 September 2024 (UTC)

Peter Šulek (born 21 September 1988) is a Slovak footballer who plays as a midfielder for Austrian club USV Brand-Nagelberg. He is left-footed.

== Honours ==
Žilina

- Slovak First Football League: 2011–12
- Slovak Cup: 2011–12
