= Jozef Rejdovian =

Slovak footballer

Personal information
- Full name: Jozef Rejdovian
- Date of birth: 18 March 1991 (age 35)
- Place of birth: Brezno, Czechoslovakia
- Height: 1.84 m (6 ft 0 in)
- Position: Midfielder

Team information
- Current team: SC St. Pölten
- Number: 10

Youth career
- Dukla Banská Bystrica

Senior career*
| Years | Team | Apps | (Gls) |
| 2010–2015 | Dukla Banská Bystrica | 56 | (5) |
| 2015–2017 | ViOn Zlaté Moravce | 20 | (1) |
| 2015 | → Dukla Banská Bystrica (loan) | 13 | (3) |
| 2017 | Dukla Banská Bystrica | 14 | (6) |
| 2017 | ESV Parndorf | 15 | (0) |
| 2018 | Pohronie | 8 | (0) |
| 2018–2019 | FC Rohrendorf | 41 | (10) |
| 2020–2021 | SC Kittsee | 21 | (1) |
| 2022 | Inter Bratislava | | |
| 2022–2023 | SCU-Ybbsitz | 40 | (25) |
| 2024– | SC St. Pölten | 3 | (2) |
- * Club domestic league appearances and goals as of 16:50, 31 March 2024 (UTC)

Jozef Rejdovian (born 18 March 1991) is a Slovak footballer who plays for Austrian 1. Klasse West/Mitte club SC St. Pölten.
