= Stanislav Angelovič =

Slovak footballer

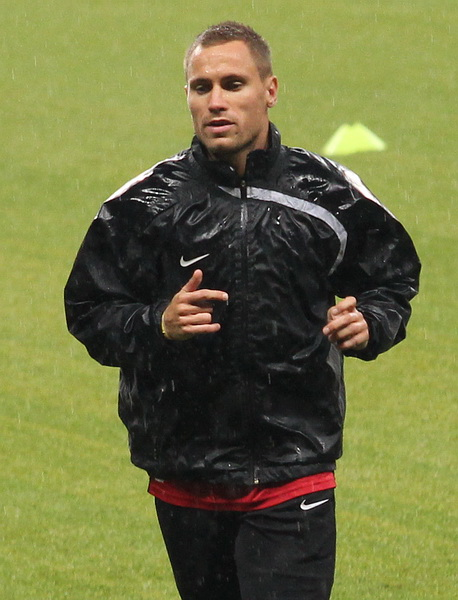

Personal information
- Date of birth: 26 March 1982 (age 44)
- Place of birth: Bratislava, Czechoslovakia
- Height: 1.71 m (5 ft 7 in)
- Position: Right-back

Youth career
- Veľké Leváre
- Topoľčany
- Martin

Senior career*
Years	Team	Apps	(Gls)
2002–2005	Inter Bratislava		
2005–2007	Senec	45	(1)
2007–2008	Maccabi Netanya	10	(0)
2008–2009	Slovan Bratislava	18	(2)
2009–2013	Žilina	103	(2)
2013–2017	ŠK Svätý Jur	85	(5)

International career
1998–1999	Slovakia U16	9	(0)
1999–2000	Slovakia U18	3	(0)

Managerial career
- 2015–2018: ŠK Svätý Jur (player-manager)
- * Club domestic league appearances and goals

Stanislav Angelovič (born 26 March 1982) is a Slovak former professional footballer who played as a right-back. He was part of MŠK Žilina during the club's golden period winning the Corgoň Liga twice, the Slovak Cup once and qualifying for the club's first and only appearance at the group stage of the UEFA Champions League. After his time with Žilina, Angelovič moved to play for and manage Svätý Jur.

Angelovič appears in RTVS, Slovak public broadcaster, during televised national team or club international fixtures as well as major tournaments, like UEFA Euro 2020, as an expert analyst and panel member.

== Career statistics ==
Appearances and goals by club, season and competition
Club	Season	League		Cup		Europe		Total	
Club	Season	Apps	Goals	Apps	Goals	Apps	Goals	Apps	Goals
Maccabi Netanya	2007–08	10	0	5	0	0	0	15	0
Slovan Bratislava	2008–09	18	2	0	0	0	0	18	2
MŠK Žilina	2009–10	21	1	0	0	3	0	24	1
MŠK Žilina	2010–11	27	1	1	0	8	0	36	1
MŠK Žilina	2011–12	24	0	5	0	1	0	30	0
MŠK Žilina	2012–13	28	0	1	0	2	0	31	0
MŠK Žilina	Total	100	2	7	0	14	0	121	2

== Honours ==
=== As Player ===
Slovan Bratislava

- Corgoň Liga: 2008–09

Žilina

- Corgoň Liga: 2009–10, 2011–12
- Slovak Super Cup: 2010
- Slovak Cup: 2011–12; runner-up 2010–11, 2012–13

=== As Coach ===
ŠK Svätý Jur

- 3. Liga: 2015–16 (Promoted)
