= Michal Pančík (footballer, born 1982) =

Slovak footballer (born 1982)

Personal information
- Full name: Michal Pančík
- Date of birth: 18 August 1982 (age 44)
- Place of birth: Brezno, Czechoslovakia
- Height: 1.82 m (5 ft 11 1/2 in)
- Position: Midfielder

Team information
- Current team: MFK Detva
- Number: 13

Youth career
- Podbrezová

Senior career*
| Years | Team | Apps | (Gls) |
| –2003 | Podbrezová | | |
| 2003–2013 | Banská Bystrica | 289 | (10) |
| 2013–2016 | Podbrezová | 58 | (5) |
| 2015–2016 | → Banská Bystrica (loan) | 29 | (1) |
| 2016– | Detva | 5 | (1) |

International career
| 2006 | Slovakia | 1 | (0) |
- * Club domestic league appearances and goals as of 28 August 2016

Michal Pančík (born 18 August 1982) is a Slovak football midfielder. He currently plays for MFK Detva.
