= Patrik Čarnota =

Slovak footballer

Personal information
- Full name: Patrik Čarnota
- Date of birth: 10 October 1986 (age 40)
- Place of birth: Stará Ľubovňa, Czechoslovakia
- Height: 1.84 m (6 ft 0 in)
- Positions: Defender; defensive midfielder

Team information
- Current team: SC Gresten
- Number: 5

Youth career
- Stará Ľubovňa
- Bardejov
- Tatran Prešov

Senior career*
Years	Team	Apps	(Gls)
2006–2007	Glinik/Karpatia Gorlice		
2007–2010	Dolný Kubín		
2010–2013	Spartak Trnava	76	(1)
2013	GKS Tychy	14	(0)
2014–2015	Spartak Trnava	13	(0)
2016	SV Gaflenz	11	(0)
2016	Sportunion Hofstetten Grünau	12	(2)
2017	SC Frauenkirchen	11	(4)
2017–2020	ASK SAR Hausmening	50	(12)
2021	USC Krumbach	0	(0)
2021	ASK Kematen	12	(2)
2022	Union Haag	9	(0)
2022–2024	SV Gottsdorf/Marbach/Persenbeug	49	(3)
2024–	SC Gresten	6	(2)
- * Club domestic league appearances and goals as of 10 October 2024

Patrik Čarnota (born 10 October 1986) is a Slovak footballer who plays as a defender or a defensive midfielder for Austrian club SC Gresten.

His brother Ján Čarnota is also footballer.

== Club career ==
He was signed by Trnava in July 2010 and made his debut for them against Senica on 17 July 2010.

He had a brief spell in Polish GKS Tychy in fall 2013, but returned to Trnava in February 2014.
