= Ján Novák (footballer) =

Slovak footballer

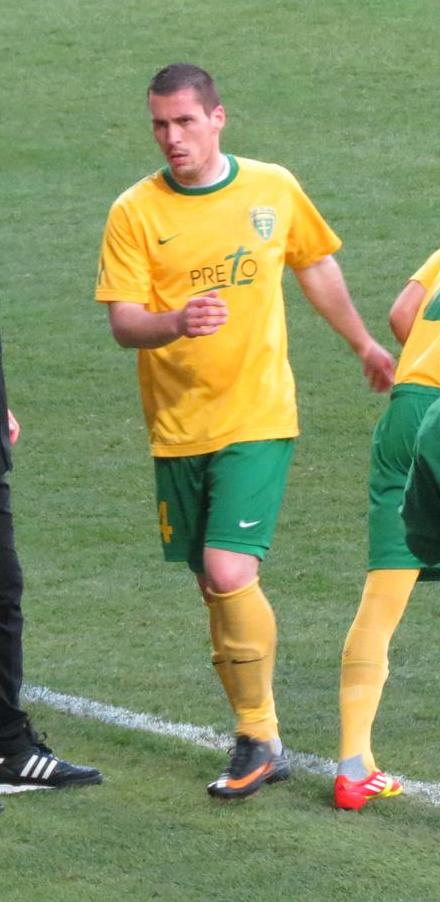

Personal information
- Full name: Ján Novák
- Date of birth: 6 March 1985 (age 41)
- Place of birth: Trebišov, Czechoslovakia
- Height: 1.75 m (5 ft 9 in)
- Position: Forward

Team information
- Current team: Mladosť Kalša
- Number: 18

Youth career
- Slavoj Trebišov

Senior career*
Years	Team	Apps	(Gls)
2004–2006	Slavoj Trebišov	78	(22)
2006–2011	Košice	112	(45)
2011	→ Tours (loan)	0	(0)
2012	Žilina	11	(1)
2012	→ Košice (loan)	13	(5)
2013–2015	Tatran Prešov	12	(1)
2013–2015	→ Košice (loan)	37	(9)
2015–2017	Iskra Borčice	57	(39)
2018–2019	Slavoj Trebišov	42	(10)
2020–2021	Mladosť Kalša	?	(?)

International career
2008–2010	Slovakia	4	(0)

Managerial career
- 2022-: Slavoj Trebišov (assistant)
- * Club domestic league appearances and goals as of 9 January 2020

Ján Novák (born 6 March 1985) is a Slovak footballer who plays for Mladosť Kalša as a forward.

== Club career ==
Novák became the 2007–08 Corgoň Liga top goalscorer, scoring 17 goals in 23 matches. In 2 consecutive games he scored 8 times. He scored three times against A.S. Roma in the 2009–10 UEFA Europa League play-off round whereby he showed great performance, evoking interest in Fulham. Novák had a trial at Birmingham City in December 2009 with a view to completing a £2.7m move. However Birmingham City manager Alex McLeish decided against signing him and Novák returned to Košice. He was injured at pre-season training camp in July 2010. He had to undergo surgery of the cruciate ligament and meniscus in August 2010. Nevertheless, he signed a half-year loan for the Ligue 2 team Tours in December 2010. His convalescence was not successful and he did not play any match for Tours. He played his first match after injury against Spartak Trnava on 24 July 2011. In the first half of the 2011–12 season his form was behind his performances before the injury. In January 2012, he signed a two-year contract for Žilina.

== International career ==
On 20 May 2008, Novák made his debut for the Slovak national team in a 0–1 defeat against Turkey in a friendly match.

== Career statistics ==
As of 7 June 2013

Club performance			League		Cup		Continental		Total	
Season	Club	League	Apps	Goals	Apps	Goals	Apps	Goals	Apps	Goals
Slovakia			League		Slovak Cup		Europe		Total	
2006–07	MFK Košice	Corgoň Liga	20	2	1	0	0	0	21	2
2007–08	MFK Košice	Corgoň Liga	23	17	5	3	0	0	28	20
2008–09	MFK Košice	Corgoň Liga	31	12	7	6	0	0	38	18
2009–10	MFK Košice	Corgoň Liga	29	12	3	3	4	5	36	20
2010–11	MFK Košice	Corgoň Liga	0	0	0	0	0	0	0	0
2011–12	MFK Košice	Corgoň Liga	9	2	3	0	0	0	12	2
2012–13	MFK Košice	Corgoň Liga	13	5	2	2	0	0	15	7
France			League		Coupe de France		Europe		Total	
2010–11	Tours	Ligue 2	0	0	0	0	0	0	0	0
Slovakia			League		Slovak Cup		Europe		Total	
2011–12	Žilina	Corgoň Liga	11	1	0	0	0	0	11	1
2012–13	Tatran Prešov	Corgoň Liga	12	1	0	0	0	0	12	1
Total	Slovakia		148	52	21	14	4	5	173	71
Total	France		0	0	0	0	0	0	0	0
Career total			148	52	21	14	4	5	173	71

== Honours ==
=== MFK Košice ===
- Slovak Cup: 2008–09

=== Individual ===
- Corgoň Liga Top Scorer: 2007–08
