= Miroslav Barčík =

Slovak footballer

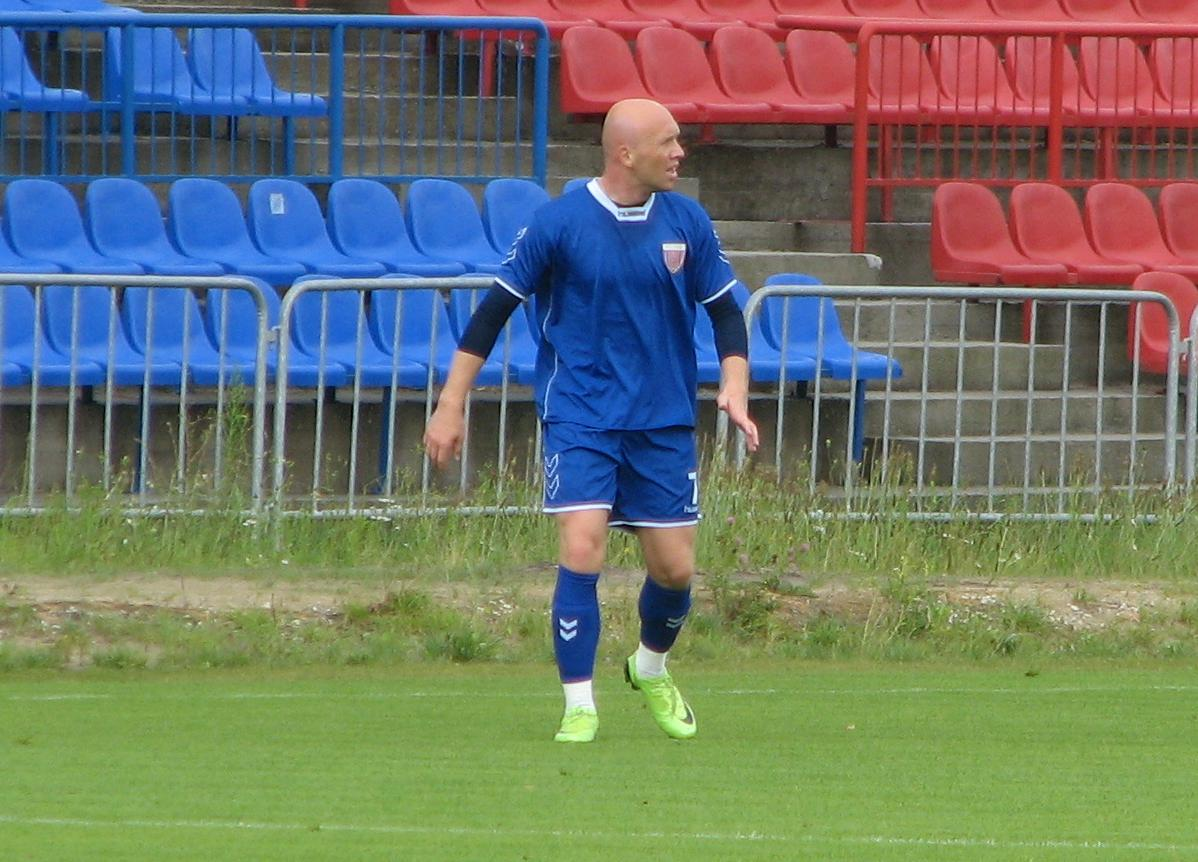

Personal information
- Full name: Miroslav Barčík
- Date of birth: 26 May 1978 (age 48)
- Place of birth: Čadca, Czechoslovakia
- Height: 1.73 m (5 ft 8 in)
- Position: Midfielder

Team information
- Current team: TJ Divina

Senior career*
Years	Team	Apps	(Gls)
1996–2001	Žilina	151	(15)
2002	Göztepe	10	(1)
2002–2006	Žilina	128	(10)
2006	Ergotelis	6	(0)
2007–2009	Spartak Trnava	45	(5)
2008–2009	→ Nitra (loan)	27	(1)
2009–2011	Polonia Bytom	54	(4)
2011–2013	Žilina	65	(6)
2014	Polonia Bytom	12	(1)
2015–2018	Borčice	66	(6)
2019–2023	MŠK Fomat Martin		
2023–	TJ Divina		

International career
2003–2005	Slovakia	2	(0)
- * Club domestic league appearances and goals as of 8 December 2023

Miroslav Barčík (born 26 May 1978) is a Slovak professional footballer who plays as a midfielder for TJ Divina. His former club was a Corgoň Liga club MŠK Žilina.

== Club career ==
Barčík previously played for Göztepe A.Ş. in the Turkish Super Lig and Ergotelis in the Super League Greece. In August 2008 he was sent on loan from FC Spartak Trnava to another slovak club FC Nitra. He also had various offers from Poland, Hungary, Czech Republic or Cyprus.

== International career ==
Barčík made two appearances for the Slovakia national football team, debuting in a friendly against Colombia on 20 August 2003.

Barčík also played for Slovakia at the 2000 Olympic Games in Sydney.

== Honours ==
Žilina

- Slovak Super Liga: 2001–02, 2002–03, 2003–04, 2011–12
- Slovak Cup: 2011–12
- Slovak Super Cup: 2003, 2004
