= Ernest Mabouka =

Cameroonian footballer

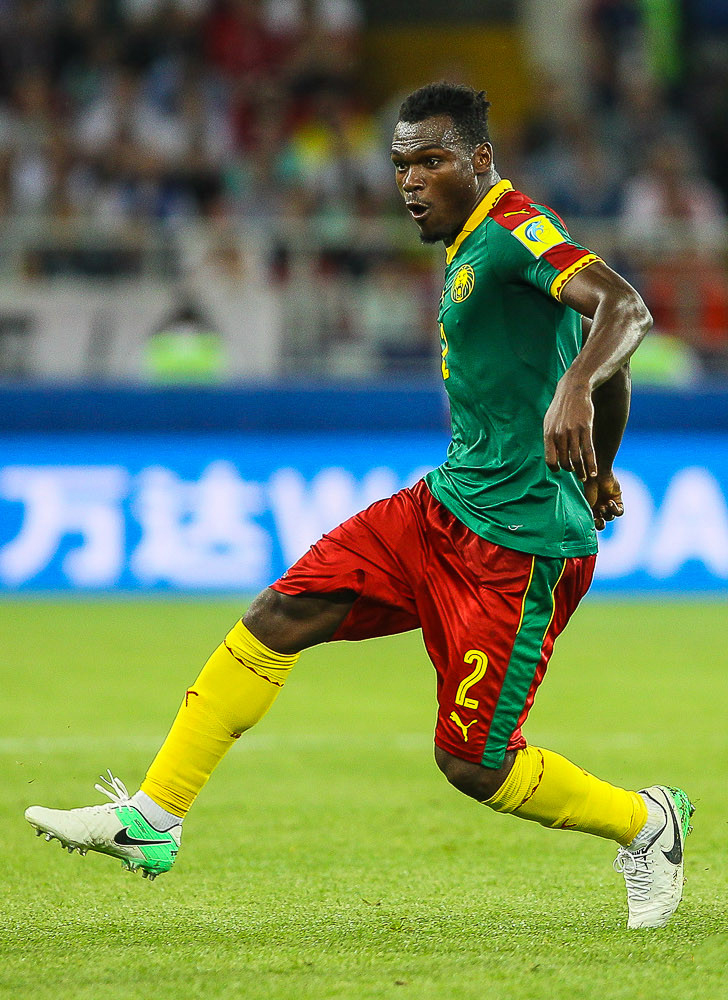
- Mabouka at the 2017 Confederations Cup

Personal information
- Full name: Ernest Olivier Bienvenu; Mabouka Massoussi
- Date of birth: 16 June 1988 (age 38)
- Place of birth: Douala, Cameroon
- Height: 1.76 m (5 ft 9 in)
- Position: Right back

Youth career
- –2010: Les Astres

Senior career*
Years	Team	Apps	(Gls)
2010–2017	Žilina	168	(4)
2017–2021	Maccabi Haifa	112	(1)
2022	Hapoel Nof HaGalil	6	(0)

International career
2017	Cameroon	9	(0)
Medal record
Men's football
Representing Cameroon
Africa Cup of Nations
Winner	2017 Gabon
- * Club domestic league appearances and goals as of 1 June 2022

Ernest Olivier Bienvenu Mabouka Massoussi (born 16 June 1988) is a Cameroonian professional footballer who plays as a right-back for Israeli Premier League club Hapoel Nof HaGalil.

== Club career ==
=== Žilina ===
Mabouka made his debut for MŠK Žilina against Tatran Liptovský Mikuláš in the 2nd leg of the 2010–11 Slovak Cup quarterfinals.

=== Maccabi Haifa ===
Mabouka signed for Maccabi Haifa on 9 July 2017. On 4 November 2019, he scored his first goal for Maccabi Haifa, the winning goal in the 92nd minute in a 2–1 win over Hapoel Tel Aviv.

On 30 May 2021, he won the Israeli Premier League championship. Mabouka became a free agent after Maccabi Haifa chose to not renew his contract at the end of the season.

== International career ==
Mabouka was called up to the Cameroon national team for the 2017 Africa Cup of Nations. He made his debut in a pre-tournament friendly win 2–0 against the DR Congo on 5 January 2017.

== Honours ==
MŠK Žilina

- Fortuna Liga: 2016–17

Maccabi Haifa

- Israeli Premier League: 2020–21

Cameroon

- Africa Cup of Nations: 2017
