= Serge Akakpo =

Togolese footballer (born 1987)

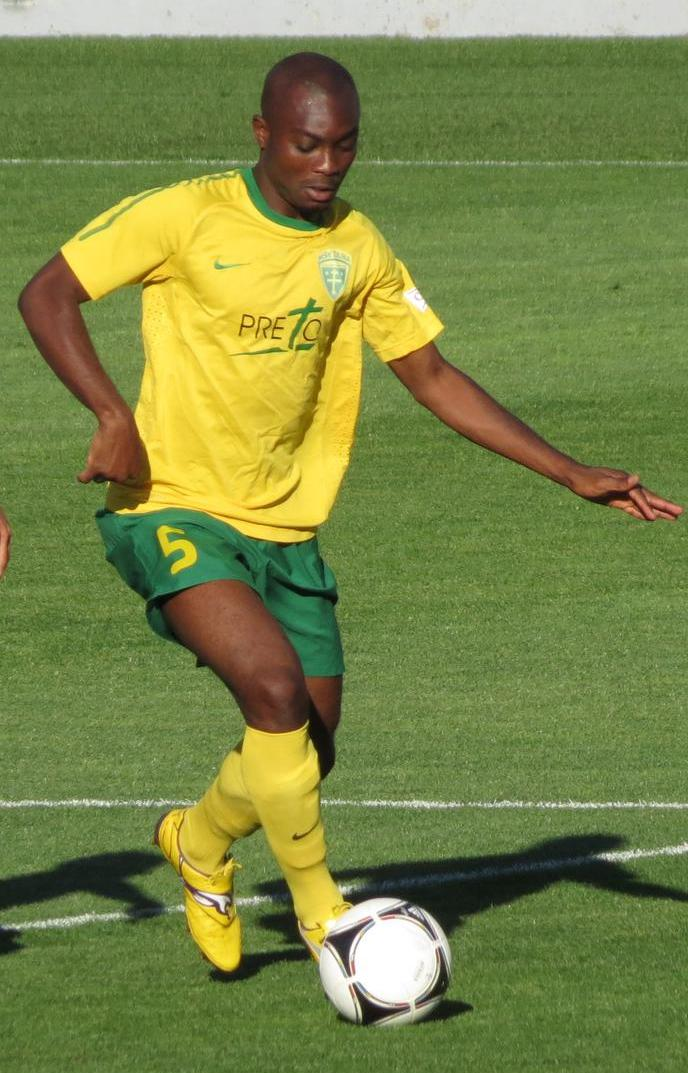
- Akakpo with Žilina in 2012

Personal information
- Full name: Serge Ognadon Akakpo
- Date of birth: 15 October 1987 (age 39)
- Place of birth: Lomé, Togo
- Height: 1.79 m (5 ft 10 in)
- Position: Centre-back

Youth career
- 2000–2004: Auxerre

Senior career*
Years	Team	Apps	(Gls)
2004–2008	Auxerre B	57	(0)
2009–2010	Vaslui	18	(2)
2010–2011	Celje	31	(3)
2012–2013	Žilina	51	(5)
2014–2015	Hoverla Uzhhorod	30	(1)
2015–2016	1461 Trabzon	21	(0)
2016	→ Trabzonspor (loan)	7	(1)
2016–2017	Trabzonspor	7	(0)
2017	Gaziantep BB	17	(0)
2018	Arsenal Kyiv	5	(0)
2019	Elazığspor	4	(0)

International career
2005–2006	France U17	2	(0)
2006–2007	France U19	5	(0)
2008	Benin B	1	(0)
2008–2017	Togo	58	(2)
- * Club domestic league appearances and goals

Serge Ognadon Akakpo (born 15 October 1987) is a Togolese retired professional footballer who played as a centre-back for the Togo national football team.

== Club career ==
Akakpo began his career with Auxerre after breaking through the youth academy, he made his first-team debut with Auxerre in July 2007. Akakpo left Auxerre on a free transfer in January 2009 and moved to Liga I team Vaslui in Romania on a lucrative deal. He subsequently had spells with Celje and Žilina in Slovenia and Slovakia respectively. In 2014, Akakpo joined Ukrainian club Hoverla Uzhhorod. He made 30 Ukrainian Premier League appearances for Hoverla before leaving. Akakpo played for 1461 Trabzon of TFF First League in 2015 before completing a loan move to Süper Lig team Trabzonspor, after seven appearances the club signed him on a permanent contract. On 31 January 2017, Akakpo joined Turkish second-tier side Gaziantep BB.

== International career ==
Akakpo represented the Togo national team from 2008 to 2017, becoming captain on numerous occasions. He played his first international game for Togo, on 10 September 2008, against Zambia in Chililabombwe. Before representing Togo, he played for France at U17 and U19 level and also played one match for the Benin B national team. In January 2010, Akakpo was one of the players involved when the Togo national team's bus was targeted in a gunfire attack by rebels in Angola two days before the team was to play in the 2010 Africa Cup of Nations.

== Career statistics ==
Appearances and goals by national team and year
National team	Year	Apps	Goals
Togo	2008	4	0
Togo	2009	7	0
Togo	2010	5	0
Togo	2011	7	0
Togo	2012	8	0
Togo	2013	8	0
Togo	2014	4	1
Togo	2015	6	1
Togo	2016	7	0
Togo	2017	2	0
Total		58	2

Scores and results list Togo's goal tally first, score column indicates score after each Akakpo goal.

List of international goals scored by Serge Akakpo
No.	Date	Venue	Opponent	Score	Result	Competition
1	15 October 2014	Stade de Kégué, Lomé, Togo	Uganda	1–0	1–0	2015 Africa Cup of Nations qualification
2	4 September 2015	El Hadj Hassan Gouled Aptidon Stadium, Djibouti City, Djibouti	Djibouti	1–0	2–0	2017 Africa Cup of Nations qualification

== Personal life ==
Akakpo also holds French nationality.

== Honours ==
Žilina

- Slovak Super Liga: 2011–12
- Slovak Cup: 2011–12
