= Mestský štadión Bardejov =

Football stadium in Bardejov, Slovakia

Mestský futbalový štadión Bardejov
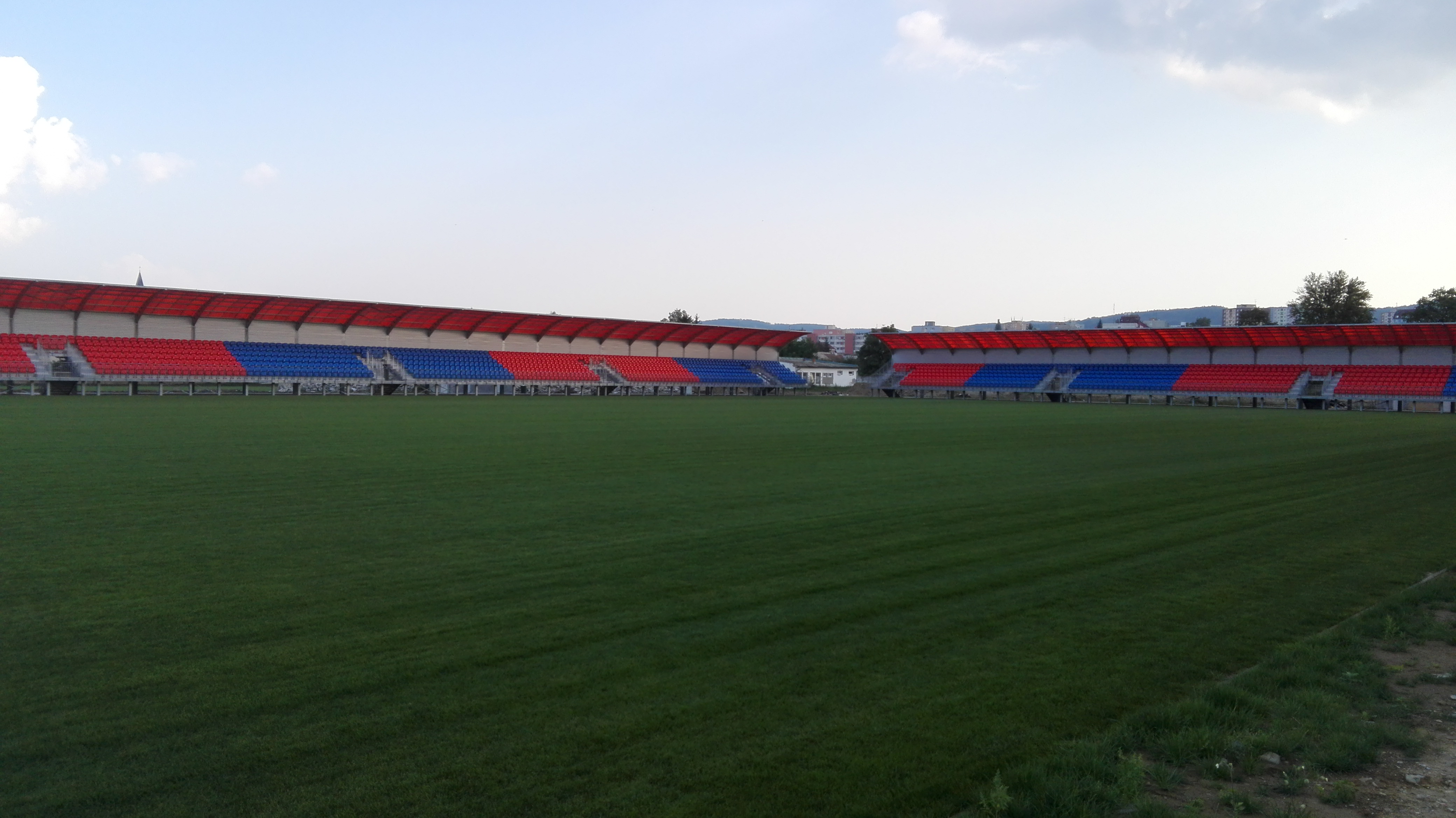
- Interactive map of Mestský futbalový štadión Bardejov
- Location: Bardejov, Slovakia
- Operator: Partizán Bardejov
- Capacity: 3,435
- Surface: Grass
- Field size: 110 x 65 m

Construction
- Opened: 1966
- Renovated: 2012, 2015-16

Tenant
- Partizán Bardejov

Mestský štadión Bardejov is a football stadium in Bardejov, Slovakia. It is the home ground of a local club Partizán Bardejov. The stadium has a capacity of 3,435 seats.

== History ==
=== Early years ===
The Bardejov Municipal Stadium was opened on July 30, 1966. The opening match was a 2–1 loss between the hosts and Dukla Prague. The stadium was equipped with an athletics track. Before its opening, Partizán Bardejov played on the "pri stara píle" pitch.

On May 22, 1971, the stadium hosted one group stage match of the 1971 UEFA European Under-18 Championship between England and Yugoslavia.

In 2012, the stadium hosted the final match of Slovak Cup between FK Senica and Žilina. Žilina would win the game 3–2 on penalties to win the cup for the first time in their history.

=== 2015–2017 reconstruction ===
In 2015, reconstruction began on the stadium. The estimated cost was €1.5 million. The Czech company Metrostav won the construction competition, and the contractor was the Bardejov-based company Pamo - PM. After the renovation, the stadium has a seating capacity of 3,435. The 400-meter-long athletics track was removed. The stadium was supposed to be completed in September 2016, after the start of the new season, but this was not met. Work slowed down, construction stopped after a pressure test on the pipeline for heating the turf. Although everything was correct, a defect occurred during the loading of the soil, and the pressure dropped. Grass was sown at the beginning of July, but it took a little longer for the grass to take root than with a laid carpet. The stadium reconstruction was completed in March 2017.
