= Roman Gergel =

Slovak footballer

Personal information
- Date of birth: 22 February 1988 (age 38)
- Place of birth: Bánovce nad Bebravou, Czechoslovakia
- Height: 1.80 m (5 ft 11 in)
- Position: Forward

Youth career
- Bánovce nad Bebravou
- Trenčín

Senior career*
Years	Team	Apps	(Gls)
2007–2010	Trenčín	88	(13)
2010–2014	Žilina	68	(2)
2013	→ Prešov (loan)	11	(1)
2014	→ Dunajská Streda (loan)	14	(3)
2014–2016	Górnik Zabrze	77	(19)
2016–2023	Bruk-Bet Termalica	161	(37)

International career
2006–2007	Slovakia U19	9	(0)
2009–2010	Slovakia U21	13	(1)
2017	Slovakia (unofficial)	2	(0)
- * Club domestic league appearances and goals as of 20:02, 11 June 2023 (UTC)

Roman Gergel (born 22 February 1988) is a Slovak professional footballer who plays as a forward.

== Club career ==
Gergel made his Corgoň Liga debut in the 7–1 defeat against MŠK Žilina on 14 July 2007. After his first season he relegated with Trenčín to the Second Division. He scored 10 goals in the 2008–09 season and 3 goals in the 2009–10 season. In September 2010, he signed four-year contract for MŠK Žilina for an undisclosed fee. He played four games for Žilina at the 2010–11 UEFA Champions League group stage.

== International career ==
Gergel was first called up to the Slovakia senior national team for two unofficial friendly fixtures held in Abu Dhabi, UAE, in January 2017, against Uganda and Sweden. He capped his debut against Uganda, being fielded from the start until the 70th minute, when he was substituted for Miroslav Káčer. Slovakia went on to lose the game 3–1. Gergel also appeared in the second half of the match against Sweden. In the 60th minute he substituted Káčer. Slovakia lost the match 0–6.

== Honours ==
Žilina

- Slovak Superliga: 2011–12
- Slovak Cup: 2011–12

Individual

- I liga Player of the Year: 2020
- I liga top scorer: 2020–21
