= Martin Krnáč =

Slovak footballer

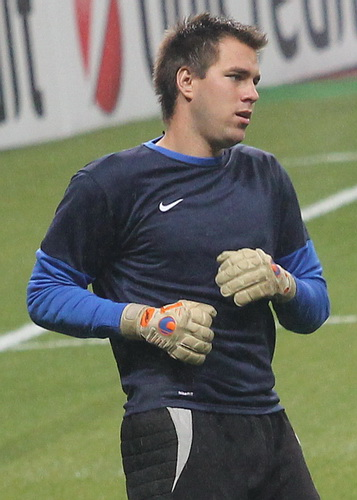

Personal information
- Full name: Martin Krnáč
- Date of birth: 30 January 1985 (age 41)
- Place of birth: Czechoslovakia
- Height: 1.90 m (6 ft 3 in)
- Position: Goalkeeper

Team information
- Current team: SC Kittsee (goalkeeper coach)

Youth career
- Inter Bratislava

Senior career*
Years	Team	Apps	(Gls)
2004–2009	Inter Bratislava	24	(0)
2009–2010	Senica	0	(0)
2010–2014	Žilina	62	(0)
2015–2017	Slovan Bratislava	12	(0)
2016	→ Skalica (loan)	13	(0)
2017	Mezőkövesd	0	(0)
2018	Karviná	0	(0)
2018–2019	ViOn Zlaté Moravce	14	(0)
2019	ŠK Vrakuňa		
2020	SC Kittsee	0	(0)

Managerial career
- 2022–2023: FC Petržalka (GK coach)
- 2023-2024: FK Rača (GK coach)
- 2025-: Slovan Bratislava (GK coach)
- * Club domestic league appearances and goals as of 19:42, 26 October 2020 (UTC)

Martin Krnáč (born 30 January 1985) is a Slovak retired footballer who and current goalkeeper coach of SC Kittsee.

He was second-choice goalkeeper behind Martin Dúbravka for MSK's games in the 2010-11 UEFA Champions League.

== Career ==
=== Club career ===
In January 2020, Krnáč, who also is running a goalkeeper school in Bratislava, joined Austrian club SC Kittsee as a goalkeeper coach. He was also on the bench for one league game in October 2020.
