= Jozef Piaček =

Slovak footballer

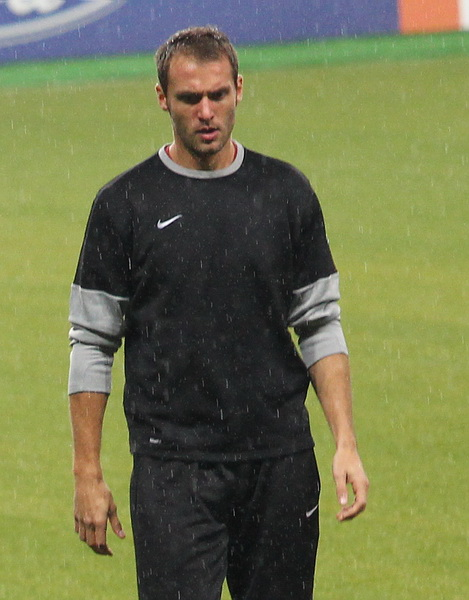

Personal information
- Full name: Jozef Piaček
- Date of birth: 20 June 1983 (age 43)
- Place of birth: Zlaté Moravce, Czechoslovakia
- Height: 1.93 m (6 ft 4 in)
- Position: Centre-back

Youth career
- TJ Tekovské Nemce

Senior career*
Years	Team	Apps	(Gls)
2001–2002	Zlaté Moravce		
2002	Ozeta Dukla Trenčín	6	(0)
2004–2005	Zlaté Moravce		
2006–2008	Skonto Rīga	60	(8)
2008–2015	Žilina	177	(11)
2016–2017	Podbeskidzie Bielsko-Biała	42	(1)

International career
2013	Slovakia	1	(0)
- * Club domestic league appearances and goals

Jozef Piaček (born 20 June 1983) is a Slovak former professional footballer who played as a centre-back.

From 2006 to 2008, he played in Latvia with Skonto. He played in 27 of the Riga club's 28 matches in the 2006 season, scoring three goals. Piaček was part of the Žilina squad which reached the group stage of the 2010–11 UEFA Champions League. He played in five of the six group matches.

== Honours ==
Žilina

- Slovak Superliga: 2009–10, 2011–12
- Slovak Cup: 2011–12
- Slovak Super Cup: 2010
