= Vladimír Leitner =

Slovak footballer

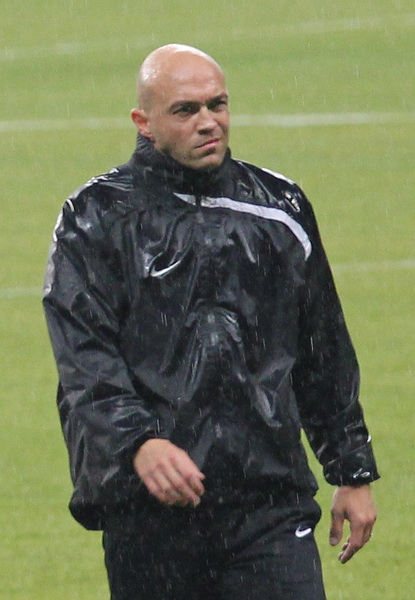

Personal information
- Date of birth: 28 June 1974 (age 52)
- Place of birth: Žilina, Czechoslovakia
- Height: 1.78 m (5 ft 10 in)
- Position: Left-back

Team information
- Current team: Žilina (team manager)

Senior career*
Years	Team	Apps	(Gls)
1992–1996	Žilina	60	(4)
1996–2000	Spartak Trnava	100	(4)
2000–2004	Teplice	90	(1)
2004–2006	Banská Bystrica	45	(0)
2006–2014	Žilina	119	(3)

International career
	Slovakia U21	21	(0)
1998–2003	Slovakia	25	(1)
- * Club domestic league appearances and goals

Vladimir Leitner (born 28 June 1974) is a Slovak former professional footballer who played as a left-back. He currently serves as the team manager of Žilina. Leitner played 25 international games for Slovakia and scored one goal.

== Honours ==
Spartak Trnava

- Slovak Cup: 1997–98
- Slovak Super Cup: 1998

Teplice

- Czech Cup: 2002–03

Banská Bystrica

- Slovak Cup: 2004–05

Žilina

- Corgoň Liga: 2006–07, 2009–10
- Slovak Super Cup: 2007, 2010
