= Ricardo Nunes (footballer, born 1986) =

South African soccer player

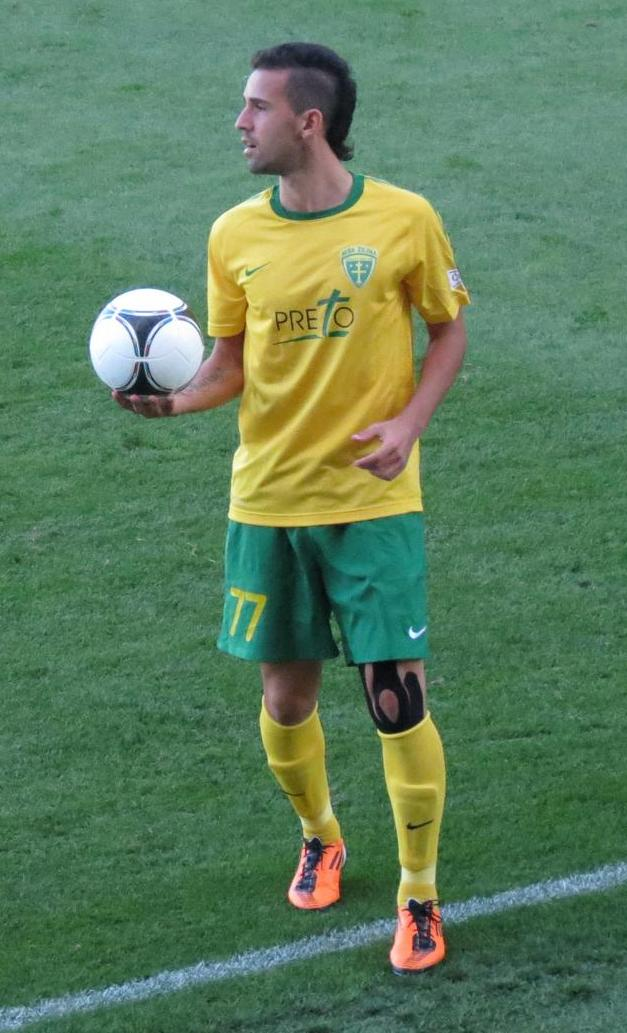
- Nunes playing for Žilina in 2012

Personal information
- Full name: Ricardo Nuno dos Santos Nunes
- Date of birth: 18 June 1986 (age 40)
- Place of birth: Johannesburg, South Africa
- Height: 1.78 m (5 ft 10 in)
- Position: Left-back

Youth career
- 1998–2002: Estoril
- 2002–2005: Benfica

Senior career*
Years	Team	Apps	(Gls)
2005–2006	Benfica B	23	(1)
2006–2007	Lamia	30	(0)
2007–2008	AEP	25	(2)
2008–2010	Aris Limassol	32	(7)
2010	Olympiakos Nicosia	12	(1)
2010–2011	Trofense	7	(0)
2011–2012	Portimonense	17	(0)
2012–2013	Žilina	51	(2)
2014	Levski Sofia	9	(0)
2014–2020	Pogoń Szczecin	143	(6)
2015	Pogoń Szczecin II	1	(0)
Total		350	(19)

International career
2003	Portugal U17	4	(0)
2012–2013	South Africa	5	(0)
- * Club domestic league appearances and goals

Ricardo Nuno dos Santos Nunes (born 18 June 1986) is a South African former professional soccer player who played as a left-back.

== Club career ==
The son of Portuguese parents, Nunes was born in Johannesburg, South Africa, and moved to Portugal where he started practising the sport. He first appeared for G.D. Estoril Praia, joining the club at the age of 12.

After emerging through S.L. Benfica's youth system – he only played for its reserves, spending the 2005–06 campaign in the third division – Nunes continued his senior career in the lower leagues of Greece and Cyprus. It was in Cyprus where he had his first taste of top-flight football, appearing in the First Division for AEP Paphos FC and Olympiakos Nicosia.

On 31 January 2012, after one and a half seasons in the Portuguese Segunda Liga, Nunes signed a two-and-a-half-year contract with MŠK Žilina. In February 2014 he moved teams and countries again, joining Bulgaria's PFC Levski Sofia until June 2015.

Nunes signed for Pogoń Szczecin in the Polish Ekstraklasa on 16 September 2014, and made 153 competitive appearances over a six-year spell.

== International career ==
Although Nunes was born in South Africa, he represented Portugal at under-17 level. This meant that he required permission from FIFA before he could switch allegiance to South Africa, after he had spoken with Gordon Igesund.

In early October 2012, Nunes was named in the South Africa squad for friendlies against Poland and Kenya. During this announcement, Igesund said that "Nunes is a very exciting player" and that he is "a specialist free kick taker". He made his debut on the 12th against Poland, a 1–0 loss in Warsaw.

== Honours ==
Žilina

- Slovak First Football League: 2011–12
- Slovak Cup: 2011–12
