= 2011–12 1. FC Tatran Prešov season =

Tatran Prešov
2011–12 season
- President: Branislav Prieložný; Miroslav Remeta
- Head Coach: Serhiy Kovalets
- Stadium: Tatran stadium, Prešov
- Corgoň Liga: 10th
- Slovnaft Cup: Quarterfinals
- Top goalscorer: League: Katona (5); All: Katona (5)
- Highest home attendance: 2,811 (vs Slovan Bratislava, 2 October 2011)
- Lowest home attendance: 740 (vs Senica, 15 October 2011)
Home colours	Away colours

The 2011–12 1. FC Tatran Prešov season was the 13th consecutive edition of Tatran Prešov in the top tier Slovak First League football in Slovakia.

== Squad ==
As of 20 May 2012
Note: Flags indicate national team as defined under FIFA eligibility rules; some limited exceptions apply. Players may hold more than one non-FIFA nationality.

No.	Pos.	Nation	Player
1	GK	SVK	Maroš Ferenc
2	DF	SVK	Michal Piter-Bučko
4	MF	SVK	Patrik Jacko
5	DF	SVK	Michal Krajník
6	MF	SVK	Viliam Macko
7	MF	SVK	Marián Adam
9	DF	SVK	Jaroslav Kolbas
10	FW	SVK	Jozef Dolný
11	MF	SVK	Peter Katona
13	MF	SVK	Ľubomír Ivanko-Macej
16	FW	SVK	Matúš Marcin
17	MF	SVK	Peter Lipták
21	DF	CZE	Jan Krob (on loan from Sparta Prague)
22	FW	CZE	David Střihavka (on loan from Žilina)

No.	Pos.	Nation	Player
23	GK	CZE	Jakub Diviš
24	DF	SVK	Ján Papaj (captain)
25	FW	ARM	Narek Beglaryan (on loan from Mika)
26	MF	SVK	Štefan Zošák (on loan from Žilina)
29	FW	SVK	Dávid Guba
30	GK	CZE	Jakub Plánička
31	DF	SVK	Peter Petráš
36	MF	SVK	Lukáš Hruška
38	DF	SVK	Peter Leško
44	MF	UKR	Andriy Yakovlev
51	DF	CZE	Jakub Heidenreich
55	MF	UKR	Anton Lysyuk
80	DF	SVK	Lukáš Štetina (on loan from Metalist Kharkiv)
99	MF	BRA	Rafael

== Transfers ==
=== In ===
Date	Position	Player	From	Fee
9 June 2011	GK	(Slovakia) Maroš Ferenc	Eindhoven	Free
20 June 2011	FW	(Slovakia) Róbert Zeher	Ostrava	Loan
22 June 2011	GK	(Czech Republic) Jakub Diviš	Hibernian	Loan expiration
30 June 2011	MF	(Slovakia) Martin Pribula	Rimavská Sobota	Loan expiration
1 July 2011	MF	(Slovakia) Marián Adam	SV Haitzendorf	Free
26 July 2011	DF	(Czech Republic) Jan Krob	Sparta Prague	Loan
9 August 2011	MF	(Brazil) Rafael	Arapongas EC	Undisclosed
21 September 2011	FW	(Brazil) Higor Coimbra	Olomouc	Loan
31 December 2011	FW	(Slovakia) Jozef Dolný	Michalovce	Loan expiration
25 January 2012	MF	(Slovakia) Štefan Zošák	Žilina	Loan
25 January 2012	FW	(Armenia) Narek Beglaryan	Mika	Loan
17 February 2012	MF	(Slovakia) Peter Katona	free agent	Renewed contract
19 February 2012	FW	(Czech Republic) David Střihavka	Žilina	Loan
22 February 2012	DF	(Slovakia) Lukáš Štetina	Metalist Kharkiv	Loan
29 February 2012	FW	(Ukraine) Anton Lysyuk	Qizilqum Zarafshon	Undisclosed
29 February 2012	FW	(Ukraine) Andriy Yakovlev	Nasaf Qarshi	Undisclosed

=== Out ===
Date	Position	Player	To	Fee
17 June 2011	GK	(Slovakia) Ján Mucha	Ružiná	Free
30 June 2011	MF	(Slovakia) Ivan Belák	Horná Nitra	Free
1 July 2011	MF	(Bosnia and Herzegovina) Avdija Vršajević	Released	
1 July 2011	FW	(Slovakia) Ľubomír Meszároš	Released	
1 July 2011	FW	(Slovakia) Ľuboš Belejík	Released	
1 July 2011	DF	(Slovakia) Martin Baran	Released	
1 July 2011	MF	(Czech Republic) Martin Vyskočil	Žilina	Loan expiration
1 July 2011	FW	(Slovakia) Zoltán Bognár	Senec	Loan extended
13 July 2011	GK	(Slovakia) Boris Peškovič	Zabrze	Free
15 July 2011	MF	(Slovakia) Dávid Leško	Rimavská Sobota	Loan
30 August 2011	DF	(Czech Republic) Tomáš Josl	Ruch Chorzów	Undisclosed
20 September 2011	FW	(Slovakia) Jozef Dolný	Michalovce	Loan
22 September 2011	DF	(Slovakia) Marian Farbák	Sacked	
19 October 2011	DF	(Czech Republic) David Čep	Sacked	
11 January 2012	FW	(Slovakia) Róbert Zeher	Sacked	
11 January 2012	MF	(Slovakia) Peter Katona	Sacked	
11 January 2012	MF	(Slovakia) Martin Pribula	Sacked	
11 January 2012	MF	(Slovakia) Pavol Baláž	Sacked	
11 January 2012	FW	(Czech Republic) Libor Žůrek	Sacked	
24 February 2012	FW	(Brazil) Bernardo	Příbram	Loan

== Pre-season and friendlies ==
15 June 2011 Friendly	Svit (Slovakia)	1–5	1. FC Tatran Prešov (Slovakia)	Vysoké Tatry
		Report

24 June 2011 Friendly	APOEL (Cyprus)	3–2	1. FC Tatran Prešov (Slovakia)	Obertraun, Austria
18:00 CEST	Pinto 6'; Adorno 48', 83'	Report	Petráš 27'; Bernardo 80'

28 June 2011 Friendly	Fürth (Germany)	1–0	1. FC Tatran Prešov (Slovakia)	Obertraun, Austria
18:30 CEST	Klaus 3'	Report		Attendance: 100

30 June 2011 Friendly	Timișoara (Romania)	2–1	1. FC Tatran Prešov (Slovakia)	Obertraun, Austria
16:00 CEST	Tameş 30'; Nikolić 80'	Report	Guba 70'

10 July 2011 Friendly	Diósgyőr (Hungary)	3–3	1. FC Tatran Prešov (Slovakia)	Miskolc, Hungary
17:30 CEST	Lippai 27', 53'; Seydi 57'	Report	Piter-Bučko 79', 86'; Petráš 83'	Attendance: 600

21 January 2012 Friendly	Michalovce (Slovakia)	1–1	1. FC Tatran Prešov (Slovakia)	Michalovce
14:00 CEST	Rák 85'	Report	Krajník 57'

24 January 2012 Friendly	1. FC Tatran Prešov (Slovakia)	6–1	Trebišov (Slovakia)	Prešov
14:00 CEST	Ivanko-Macej 17'; Bernardo 19'; Adam 32', 89'; Kamenčík 57', 87'	Report	Takáč 44'

24 January 2012 Friendly	1. FC Tatran Prešov (Slovakia)	1–0	Bardejov (Slovakia)	Prešov
16:00 CEST	Macko 78' (pen.)	Report

28 January 2012 Friendly	Debrecen (Hungary)	1–1	1. FC Tatran Prešov (Slovakia)	Debrecen, Hungary
14:00 CEST	B. Farkas 40'	Report	Piter-Bučko 67'

28 January 2012 Friendly	Debrecen (Hungary)	3–1	1. FC Tatran Prešov (Slovakia)	Debrecen, Hungary
16:00 CEST	Kulcsár 4', 55', 65'	Report	Coimbra 8'

2 February 2012 Friendly	Metalist Kharkiv (Ukraine)	2–1	1. FC Tatran Prešov (Slovakia)	Antalya, Turkey
11:00 CEST	Devych 39' (pen.); Vorobey 48'	Report	Tarasovs 85'

3 February 2012 Friendly	Køge (Denmark)	2–3	1. FC Tatran Prešov (Slovakia)	Antalya, Turkey
10:00 CEST	Lipták 2' (o.g.); Fabinho 39'	Report	Coimbra 28' (pen.); Papaj 74'; Zošák 82'

6 February 2012 Friendly	Ploiești (Romania)	1–0	1. FC Tatran Prešov (Slovakia)	Antalya, Turkey
14:00 CEST	Ben Djemia 64'	Report

9 February 2012 Friendly	Jagodina (Serbia)	2–0	1. FC Tatran Prešov (Slovakia)	Antalya, Turkey
14:00 CEST	Kostić 31'; Milenković 43'	Report

10 February 2012 Friendly	Uzhhorod (Ukraine)	1–0	1. FC Tatran Prešov (Slovakia)	Antalya, Turkey
		Report

13 February 2012 Friendly	Mariupol (Ukraine)	1–3	1. FC Tatran Prešov (Slovakia)	Antalya, Turkey
15:00 CEST	Targamadze 9'	Report	Macko 35' (pen.), 75'; Katona 80'

25 February 2012 Friendly	1. FC Tatran Prešov (Slovakia)	7–0	Giraltovce (Slovakia)	Prešov
14:30 CEST	Guba; Macko; Krob; Papaj; Adam (pen.)	Report

== Competition ==
=== Slovak First Football League ===
==== Matches ====
16 July 2011 1	Senica	3–0	Tatran Prešov	Senica
19:30	Kroupa 19'; Hošek 68'; Kalabiška 86'	Summary	Josl (yellow card) 30' (yellow-red card) 65'	Stadium: Štadión FK Senica; Attendance: 1,433; Referee: (Slovakia) Peter Královič

24 July 2011 2	Tatran Prešov	0–0	MŠK Žilina	Prešov
17:30	Piter-Bučko (red card) 44'	Summary		Stadium: Tatran Stadium; Attendance: 2,155; Referee: (Slovakia) Ivan Kružliak

31 July 2011 3	Spartak Trnava	0–0	Tatran Prešov	Trnava
19:30		Summary		Stadium: Štadión Antona Malatinského; Attendance: 3,975; Referee: (Slovakia) Michal Perašín

6 August 2011 4	Tatran Prešov	0–1	Banská Bystrica	Prešov
17:30		Summary	Prekop 85'	Stadium: Tatran Stadium; Attendance: 1,750; Referee: Vladimír Hracho

12 August 2011 5	Zlaté Moravce	1–2	Tatran Prešov	Zlaté Moravce
19:30	Chren 47'	Summary	Bernardo 37'; Papaj 81'	Stadium: FC ViOn Stadium; Attendance: 2,011; Referee: Ján Valášek

20 August 2011 6	Tatran Prešov	1–1	Ružomberok	Prešov
17:30	Piter-Bučko (red card) 23'; Papaj 43'; Čep (yellow card) 37' (yellow-red card) 53'	Summary	Ďubek 35'	Stadium: Tatran Stadium; Attendance: 2,100; Referee: Kamil Horváth

27 August 2011 7	Nitra	2–2	Tatran Prešov	Nitra
19:30	Kolár 20'; Hodúr 68' (pen.)	Summary	Papaj 61'; Kolbas (yellow card) 50' (yellow-red card) 67'; Macko 77'	Stadium: Štadión pod Zoborom; Attendance: 1,591; Referee: Ivan Kružliak

10 September 2011 8	Tatran Prešov	0–2	Dunajská Streda	Prešov
17:30		Summary	Delarge 23'; Čorić 62' (pen.)	Stadium: Tatran Stadium; Attendance: 1,823; Referee: Roman Matúš

17 September 2011 9	Košice	1–0	Tatran Prešov	Košice
17:30	Pačinda 53' (pen.)	Summary		Stadium: Štadión Lokomotívy v Čermeli; Attendance: 3,100; Referee: Martin Ježík

24 September 2011 10	AS Trenčín	4–0	Tatran Prešov	Trenčín
17:30	Godál 4'; Štefánik 14'; Peltier 23'; Peltier 42'	Summary		Stadium: Štadión na Sihoti; Attendance: 1,812; Referee: Richard Trutz

2 October 2011 11	Tatran Prešov	0–1	Slovan Bratislava	Prešov
17:30		Summary	Milinković 61'	Stadium: Tatran Stadium; Attendance: 2,811; Referee: Peter Královič

15 October 2011 12	Tatran Prešov	0–1	Senica	Prešov
14:30		Summary	Piroska 63'	Stadium: Tatran Stadium; Attendance: 740; Referee: Ján Valášek

22 October 2011 13	Žilina	1–0	Tatran Prešov	Žilina
17:30	Pich 69'	Summary		Stadium: Stadium pod Dubňom; Attendance: 1,538; Referee: Vladimír Vnuk

28 October 2011 14	Tatran Prešov	2–0	Spartak Trnava	Prešov
16:30	Diallo 26' (o.g.); Krajník 38'	Summary	Kaščák (yellow card) 75' (yellow-red card) 78'	Stadium: Tatran Stadium; Attendance: 1,250; Referee: Ivan Kružliak

5 November 2011 15	Banská Bystrica	2–0	Tatran Prešov	Banská Bystrica
14:30	Jakubko 14'; Rejdovian 90+2'	Summary	Petráš (yellow card) 50' (yellow-red card) 75'	Stadium: SNP Stadium; Attendance: 860; Referee: Ján Valášek

9 November 2011 16	Tatran Prešov	0–1	Zlaté Moravce	Prešov
17:30		Summary	Majerník 76'	Stadium: Tatran Stadium; Attendance: 1,230; Referee: Jozef Gábor

19 November 2011 17	Ružomberok	1–1	Tatran Prešov	Ružomberok
14:30	Masaryk 18' (pen.); Jurkemik (yellow card) 73' (yellow-red card) 79'	Summary	Guba 90'	Stadium: MFK Ružomberok Stadium; Attendance: 1,654; Referee: Štefan Leško

26 November 2011 18	Tatran Prešov	1–1	Nitra	Prešov
14:30	Piter-Bučko 90+4'	Summary	Čirik (yellow card) 8' (yellow-red card) 54'; Boszorád 77'	Stadium: Tatran Stadium; Attendance: 920; Referee: Ivan Kružliak

27 March 2012 19	Dunajská Streda	0–0	Tatran Prešov	Dunajská Streda
17:30		Summary		Stadium: DAC Stadium; Attendance: 1,242; Referee: Peter Kráľovič

3 March 2012 20	Tatran Prešov	0–1	Košice	Prešov
14:30		Summary	Viazanko 45'	Stadium: Tatran Stadium; Attendance: 2,555; Referee: Michal Smolák

10 March 2012 21	Tatran Prešov	1–0	AS Trenčín	Prešov
14:30	Katona 11'	Summary		Stadium: Tatran Stadium; Attendance: 1,830; Referee: Vladimír Vnuk

17 March 2012 22	Slovan Bratislava	2–0	Tatran Prešov	Bratislava
14:30	Smetana 11'; Piliyev 83'	Summary		Stadium: Pasienky Stadium; Attendance: 2,750; Referee: Patrik Hrčka

24 March 2012 23	Senica	0–0	Tatran Prešov	Senica
17:30		Summary		Stadium: FK Senica Stadium; Attendance: 1,258; Referee: Ľubomír Samotný

31 March 2012 24	Tatran Prešov	1–1	Žilina	Prešov
14:30	Adam 45' (pen.)	Summary	Deza 80'	Stadium: Tatran Stadium; Attendance: 1,650; Referee: Roman Matúš

3 April 2012 25	Spartak Trnava	1–0	Tatran Prešov	Trnava
17:30	Bicák 28'	Summary		Stadium: Anton Malatinský Stadium; Attendance: 4,420; Referee: Kamil Horváth

7 April 2012 26	Tatran Prešov	2–2	Banská Bystrica	Prešov
17:30	Střihavka 89'; Krob 93' (pen.)	Summary	Laksík 61', 75'	Stadium: Tatran Stadium; Attendance: 1,720; Referee: Vladimír Hracho

14 April 2012 27	Zlaté Moravce	1–2	Tatran Prešov	Zlaté Moravce
17:30	Brčák 21'	Summary	Macko 64'; Katona 73'	Stadium: FC ViOn Stadium; Attendance: 1,265; Referee: Ľubomír Samotný

21 April 2012 28	Tatran Prešov	1–1	Ružomberok	Prešov
17:30	Guba 3'	Summary	Poliaček 19'	Stadium: Tatran Stadium; Attendance: 1,530; Referee: Richard Trutz

28 April 2012 29	Nitra	0–1	Tatran Prešov	Nitra
17:30		Summary	Katona 57'	Stadium: Stadium pod Zoborom; Attendance: 1,058; Referee: Kamil Horváth

5 May 2012 30	Tatran Prešov	4–0	Dunajská Streda	Prešov
17:30	Katona 18', 21'; Štetina 28'; Papaj 68'	Summary		Stadium: Tatran Stadium; Attendance: 1,350; Referee: Peter Kráľovič

12 May 2012 31	Košice	0–0	Tatran Prešov	Košice
17:30		Summary		Stadium: Stadium Lokomotívy v Čermeli; Attendance: 850; Referee: Pavol Piatka

16 May 2012 32	AS Trenčín	2–0	Tatran Prešov	Trenčín
17:30	Depetris 9'; Hlohovský 40'	Summary	Štetina (red card) 23'	Stadium: Stadium na Sihoti; Attendance: 1,312; Referee: Filip Glova

20 May 2012 33	Tatran Prešov	2–1	Slovan Bratislava	Prešov
17:30	Marcin 51'; Petráš 67'	Summary	Halenár 21'	Stadium: Tatran Stadium; Attendance: 1,035; Referee: Vladimír Vnuk

Pos	Team	Pld	W	D	L	GF	GA	GD	Pts	Qualification or relegation
8	Nitra	33	9	12	12	33	39	−6	39	
9	Dukla Banská Bystrica	33	9	10	14	37	44	−7	37	
10	Tatran Prešov	33	7	12	14	23	35	−12	33	
11	Košice	33	6	11	16	25	40	−15	29	
12	DAC Dunajská Streda (R)	33	5	1	27	21	63	−42	16	Relegation to 2. liga

Source: Kicker (in German)
Rules for classification: 1) points; 2) goal difference; 3) number of goals scored.
(R) Relegated

=== Slovnaft Cup 11–12 ===
13 September 2011 Round of 32	Tatran Prešov	2–0	Podbrezová	Prešov
16:30	Krob 17'; Bernardo 52'	Summary		Stadium: Tatran Stadium; Attendance: 855; Referee: Patrik Hrčka

28 September 2011 Round of 16	Tatran Prešov	4–0	Lučenec	Prešov
16:30	Bernardo 21'; Adam 22'; Kolbas 64'; Žůrek 73'	Summary		Stadium: Tatran Stadium; Attendance: 451; Referee: Ján Valášek

18 October 2011 Quarterfinals	Žilina	2–1	Tatran Prešov	Žilina
17:30	Mráz 60' (pen.); Deza 75'	Summary	Macko 8'	Stadium: Stadium pod Dubňom; Attendance: 714; Referee: Vladimír Hracho

1 November 2011 Quarterfinals	Tatran Prešov	2 – 1 (a.e.t.) (4–5 p)	Žilina	Prešov
14:00	Krajník 45'; Guba 72'	Summary	Ceesay 57'	Stadium: Tatran Stadium; Attendance: 1,451; Referee: Martin Ježík
	Penalties
	Adam (penalty scored); Kolbas (penalty missed); Petráš (penalty scored); Piter-Bučko (penalty scored); Krob (penalty scored)		Střihavka (penalty scored); Mráz (penalty scored); Barčík (penalty scored); Kerla (penalty scored); Mabouka (penalty scored)

== Player seasonal records ==
Competitive matches only. Updated to games played 20 May 2012.

=== Top scorers ===
Rank	Name	League	Europe	Cup	Total
1	(Slovakia) Peter Katona	5	–	0	5
2	(Slovakia) Ján Papaj	4	–	0	4
3	(Slovakia) Viliam Macko	2	–	1	3
3	(Slovakia) Dávid Guba	2	–	1	3
3	(Brazil) Bernardo	1	–	2	3
4	(Czech Republic) Jan Krob	1	–	1	2
4	(Slovakia) Michal Krajník	1	–	1	2
4	(Slovakia) Marián Adam	1	–	1	2
5	(Slovakia) Michal Piter-Bučko	1	–	–	1
5	(Slovakia) Matúš Marcin	1	–	–	1
5	(Slovakia) Peter Petráš	1	–	–	1
5	(Slovakia) Lukáš Štetina	1	–	–	1
5	(Czech Republic) David Střihavka	1	–	–	1
5	(Slovakia) Jaroslav Kolbas	–	–	1	1
5	(Czech Republic) Libor Žůrek	–	–	1	1
5	Own goal	1	–	–	1
	TOTALS	23	–	9	32

Source: Competitive matches

=== Disciplinary record ===
Includes all competitive matches. Players with 1 card or more included only.

Number	Position	Name	Slovak First League (Note: Two yellow cards resulting in a red are counted as a total of three cards – i.e. two yellow and one red card.)		Europa League		Slovak Cup		Total	
Number	Position	Name	Yellow card	Red card	Yellow card	Red card	Yellow card	Red card	Yellow card	Red card
2	DF	(Slovakia) Michal Piter-Bučko	4	2	0	0	0	0	4	2
3	DF	(Czech Republic) David Čep	3	1	0	0	0	0	3	1
5	DF	(Slovakia) Michal Krajník	2	0	0	0	1	0	3	0
6	MF	(Slovakia) Viliam Macko	3	0	0	0	1	0	4	0
7	MF	(Slovakia) Marián Adam	1	0	0	0	0	0	1	0
8	FW	(Slovakia) Róbert Zeher	2	0	0	0	1	0	3	0
9	DF	(Slovakia) Jaroslav Kolbas	3	1	0	0	0	0	3	1
11	MF	(Slovakia) Peter Katona	3	0	0	0	1	0	4	0
17	MF	(Slovakia) Peter Lipták	4	0	0	0	0	0	4	0
18	DF	(Slovakia) Marian Farbák	2	0	0	0	0	0	2	0
19	FW	(Brazil) Bernardo	3	0	0	0	0	0	3	0
20	MF	(Slovakia) Martin Pribula	2	0	0	0	0	0	2	0
21	DF	(Czech Republic) Jan Krob	5	0	0	0	1	0	6	0
23	GK	(Czech Republic) Jakub Diviš	2	0	0	0	0	0	2	0
24	MF	(Slovakia) Ján Papaj	2	0	0	0	1	0	3	0
29	FW	(Slovakia) Dávid Guba	2	0	0	0	0	0	2	0
31	DF	(Slovakia) Peter Petráš	3	1	0	0	0	0	3	1
		TOTALS	46	5	0	0	6	0	52	5

Sources: soccerway.com, UEFA.com
