= 2012–13 1. FC Tatran Prešov season =

Tatran Prešov
2012–13 season
- President: Miroslav Remeta
- Head Coach: Jozef Bubenko
- Stadium: Tatran stadium, Prešov
- Corgoň Liga: 12th (relegated)
- Slovnaft cup: Round of 16
- Top goalscorer: League: Marcin, Shevchuk (3); All: Marcin (4)
- Highest home attendance: 4,500 (vs Spartak Trnava, 26 May 2013)
- Lowest home attendance: 1,026 (vs AS Trenčín, 27 October 2012)
Home colours	Away colours

The 2012–13 1. FC Tatran Prešov season was the 14th consecutive edition of Tatran Prešov in the top tier Slovak First League football in Slovakia.

== Squad ==
As of 28 February 2013
Note: Flags indicate national team as defined under FIFA eligibility rules; some limited exceptions apply. Players may hold more than one non-FIFA nationality.

No.	Pos.	Nation	Player
2	DF	SVK	Jakub Bartek
3	DF	SVK	Vladimír Papp
5	DF	SVK	Michal Krajník
8	MF	SVK	Radoslav Augustín (on loan from Slovan Bratislava)
9	DF	SVK	Jaroslav Kolbas
10	MF	SVK	Jozef Dolný
14	MF	SVK	Richard Kačala
15	FW	SVK	Michal Kamenčík
16	FW	SVK	Matúš Marcin
17	MF	SVK	Peter Lipták
19	MF	SVK	Miroslav Poliaček
21	MF	SVK	Patrik Jacko

No.	Pos.	Nation	Player
23	GK	CZE	Jakub Diviš
24	MF	SVK	Ján Papaj
30	GK	CZE	Jakub Plánička
31	DF	SVK	Peter Petráš (captain)
33	FW	SVK	Ján Novák
36	MF	SVK	Lukáš Hruška
42	MF	SVK	Roman Gergel (on loan from Žilina)
44	MF	UKR	Andriy Yakovlev
45	GK	SVK	Denis Barát
84	DF	SVK	Miloš Brezinský
87	DF	CZE	Jan Krob
88	FW	BRA	Mariano Bernardo

For recent transfers, see List of Slovak football transfers winter 2012–13.

== Transfers ==
=== In ===
Date	Position	Player	From	Fee
1 July 2012	MF	(Slovakia) Martin Pribula	(Slovakia) MŠK Rimavská Sobota	Loan expiration
1 July 2012	FW	(Brazil) Bernardo	(Czech Republic) 1. FK Příbram	Loan expiration
13 July 2012	MF	(Slovakia) Lukáš Hruška	Youth programme	
13 July 2012	FW	(Slovakia) Matúš Marcin	Youth programme	
13 July 2012	FW	(Slovakia) Michal Kamenčík	Youth programme	
13 July 2012	DF	(Slovakia) Jakub Bartek	Youth programme	
13 July 2012	GK	(Slovakia) Denis Barát	Youth programme	
17 July 2012	FW	(Bulgaria) Branimir Kostadinov	(Bulgaria) FC Botev Vratsa	Loan
23 July 2012	DF	(Slovakia) Jozef Adámik	(Czech Republic) FC Baník Ostrava	Undisclosed
2 August 2012	MF	(Slovakia) Miroslav Poliaček	(Slovakia) MFK Ružomberok	Loan
17 August 2012	DF	(Montenegro) Dejan Boljević	(Serbia) FK Smederevo	Undisclosed
7 September 2012	FW	(Ukraine) Andriy Shevchuk	(Ukraine) FC Sevastopol	Undisclosed
21 September 2012	MF	(Ukraine) Andriy Yakovlev	Free agent	
26 September 2012	MF	(Slovakia) Štefan Zošák	(Slovakia) MŠK Žilina	Loan
26 October 2012	MF	(Brazil) Rafael Torres	(Slovakia) MFK Zemplín Michalovce	Loan return
7 January 2013	MF	(Slovakia) Ľubomír Ivanko-Macej	(Slovakia) Partizán Bardejov	Loan expiration
7 January 2013	FW	(Slovakia) Michal Kamenčík	(Slovakia) MŠK Rimavská Sobota	Loan expiration
23 January 2013	DF	(Czech Republic) Jan Krob	(Czech Republic) Sparta Prague	
31 January 2013	DF	(Slovakia) Miloš Brezinský	(Kazakhstan) FC Akzhayik	
9 February 2013	MF	(Slovakia) Radoslav Augustín	(Slovakia) ŠK Slovan Bratislava	Loan
28 February 2013	FW	(Nigeria) Peter Nworah	(Spain) CD Atlético Baleares	
28 February 2013	MF	(Slovakia) Roman Gergel	(Slovakia) MŠK Žilina	Loan
28 February 2013	FW	(Slovakia) Ján Novák	(Slovakia) MŠK Žilina	

=== Out ===
Date	Position	Player	To	Fee
1 July 2012	DF	(Czech Republic) Jan Krob	(Czech Republic) Sparta Prague	Loan expiration
1 July 2012	FW	(Czech Republic) David Střihavka	(Slovakia) MŠK Žilina	Loan expiration
1 July 2011	MF	(Slovakia) Štefan Zošák	(Slovakia) MŠK Žilina	Loan expiration
1 July 2012	FW	(Armenia) Narek Beglaryan	(Armenia) FC Mika	Loan expiration
1 July 2012	MF	(Ukraine) Andriy Yakovlev	(Ukraine) FC Poltava	Loan expiration
1 July 2012	DF	(Slovakia) Lukáš Štetina	(Ukraine) FC Metalist Kharkiv	Loan expiration
2 July 2012	DF	(Slovakia) Michal Piter-Bučko	(Poland) Podbeskidzie Bielsko-Biała	Undisclosed
23 July 2012	DF	(Czech Republic) Jakub Heidenreich	Free Agent	Released
23 July 2012	FW	(Brazil) Bernardo	Free Agent	Released
12 August 2012	DF	(Slovakia) Ján Mizerák	(Slovakia) MFK Tatran Liptovský Mikuláš	Loan
16 August 2012	MF	(Slovakia) Martin Dupkala	(Slovakia) Partizán Bardejov	Loan
24 August 2012	MF	(Slovakia) Pavol Baláž	(Slovakia) MFK Topvar Topoľčany	Loan
29 August 2012	DF	(Slovakia) Artúr Benes	(Slovakia) Partizán Bardejov	Loan
29 August 2012	MF	(Slovakia) Ľubomír Ivanko-Macej	(Slovakia) Partizán Bardejov	Loan
29 August 2012	MF	(Slovakia) Ján Dzurík	(Slovakia) Partizán Bardejov	Loan
31 August 2012	FW	(Slovakia) Michal Kamenčík	(Slovakia) MŠK Rimavská Sobota	Loan
14 September 2012	MF	(Brazil) Rafael Torres	(Slovakia) MFK Zemplín Michalovce	Loan
17 September 2012	MF	(Ukraine) Anton Lysyuk	Free Agent	Released
4 December 2012	FW	(Slovakia) Dávid Guba	(Slovakia) MŠK Žilina	Undisclosed
1 January 2013	MF	(Brazil) Rafael Torres	Free Agent	Released
7 January 2013	FW	(Ukraine) Andriy Shevchuk	Free Agent	Released
24 January 2013	DF	(Slovakia) Jozef Adámik	(Slovakia) FK Dukla Banská Bystrica	
31 January 2013	DF	(Montenegro) Dejan Boljević	Free Agent	Released
28 February 2013	MF	(Slovakia) Štefan Zošák	(Slovakia) MŠK Žilina	Loan expiration
28 February 2013	MF	(Slovakia) Marián Adam	(Slovakia) MŠK Rimavská Sobota	Loan
28 February 2013	MF	(Slovakia) Peter Katona	(Slovakia) MŠK Rimavská Sobota	Loan
28 February 2013	MF	(Slovakia) Martin Pribula	(Slovakia) MŠK Rimavská Sobota	Loan
28 February 2013	MF	(Slovakia) Viliam Macko	(Slovakia) MFK Dolný Kubín	Loan
28 February 2013	FW	(Nigeria) Peter Nworah	(Slovakia) Partizán Bardejov	Loan

== Pre-season and friendlies ==
28 June 2012 Friendly	1. FC Tatran Prešov (Slovakia)	2 – 0	(Romania) Gaz Metan Mediaș	Debrecen, Hungary
	Zošák 80'; Střihavka 85'	Report

30 June 2012 Friendly	1. FC Tatran Prešov (Slovakia)	3 – 0	(Slovakia) Dolný Kubín	Prešov
11:00 CEST (UTC+02)	Hruška; Pribula; Rafael	Report

3 July 2012 Friendly	1. FC Tatran Prešov (Slovakia)	4 – 2	(Slovakia) Vranov nad Topľou	Prešov
18:00 CEST (UTC+02)	Střihavka; Macko; Rafael; Hruška	Report	Šamo; Paluba

7 July 2012 Friendly	1. FC Tatran Prešov (Slovakia)	1 - 1	(Slovakia) Michalovce	Prešov
18:30 CEST (UTC+02)	Diviš (red card) 45'; Rafael 89'	Report	Jurčo 63'

23 January 2013 Friendly	1. FC Tatran Prešov (Slovakia)	4 - 0	(Slovakia) Vranov nad Topľou	Prešov
	Ivanko-Macej 59'; Hruška 84'; Kamenčík 88', 90'	Report

26 January 2013 Friendly	1. FC Tatran Prešov (Slovakia)	2 - 1	(Slovakia) Lokomotíva Košice	Prešov
11:00 CEST (UTC+02)	Papaj 4'; Poliaček 65'	Report	Komjatý 45'

26 January 2013 Friendly	1. FC Tatran Prešov (Slovakia)	3 - 1	(Slovakia) Humenné	Prešov
13:00 CEST (UTC+02)	Kamenčík 40', 75'; Yakovlev 79'	Report	TBC 87'

30 January 2013 Friendly	(Slovakia) Michalovce	0 - 0	1. FC Tatran Prešov (Slovakia)	Michalovce
15:00 CEST (UTC+02)		Report

2 February 2013 Friendly	1. FC Tatran Prešov (Slovakia)	1 - 0	(Hungary) Nyíregyháza	Prešov
11:00 CEST (UTC+02)	Krob 65'	Report

9 February 2013 Friendly	1. FC Tatran Prešov (Slovakia)	2 - 1	(Poland) Nowy Sącz	Prešov
14:00 CEST (UTC+02)	Bernardo 20'; Krajník 73'	Report	Čertík 66'

15 February 2013 Friendly	1. FC Tatran Prešov (Slovakia)	1 - 0	(Georgia (country)) FC Tbilisi	Turkey
	Augustín 70'	Report

18 February 2013 Friendly	1. FC Tatran Prešov (Slovakia)	1 - 2	(Norway) Tromsø	Turkey
15:00 CEST (UTC+02)	Krajník 50'	Report

22 February 2013 Friendly	1. FC Tatran Prešov (Slovakia)	1 - 2	(Kazakhstan) Aktobe	Turkey
	Marcin 58'	Report

== Competition ==
=== Slovak First Football League ===
==== Matches ====
14 July 2012 1	Slovan Bratislava	2 – 1	Tatran Prešov	Bratislava
19:30	Gorosito 47'; Peltier 94'	Summary	Kolčák 15' (o.g.)	Stadium: Pasienky; Attendance: 1,558; Referee: (Slovakia) Peter Královič

22 July 2012 2	Tatran Prešov	2 - 0	FK Senica	Prešov
17:30	Guba 53'; Marcin 65'	Summary		Stadium: Tatran Stadium; Attendance: 1,550; Referee: (Slovakia) Kamil Horváth

28 July 2012 3	AS Trenčín	2 - 1	Tatran Prešov	Trenčín
17:30	Depetris 12', 85'	Summary	Ramón 74' (o.g.)	Stadium: Stadium na Sihoti; Attendance: 1,968; Referee: (Slovakia) Richard Trutz

4 August 2012 4	Tatran Prešov	2 - 0	MFK Ružomberok	Prešov
17:30	Kostadinov 4'; Adámik 25'	Summary		Stadium: Tatran Stadium; Attendance: 1,550; Referee: (Slovakia) Michal Smolák

11 August 2012 5	Zlaté Moravce	2 - 0	Tatran Prešov	Zlaté Moravce
19:30	Hodek 7'; Žilák 61'	Summary		Stadium: FC ViOn Stadium; Attendance: 1,015; Referee: (Slovakia) Marek Mastiš

18 August 2012 6	Tatran Prešov	1 - 0	FC Nitra	Prešov
17:30	Šimončič 40' (o.g.)	Summary		Stadium: Tatran Stadium; Attendance: 1,574; Referee: (Slovakia) Roman Matúš

25 August 2012 7	Dukla Banská Bystrica	0 - 0	Tatran Prešov	Banská Bystrica
19:30		Summary		Stadium: SNP Stadium; Attendance: 1,560; Referee: (Slovakia) Ján Valášek

1 September 2012 8	Spartak Myjava	2 - 0	1. FC Tatran Prešov	Myjava
17:30	Sládek 62'; Dian 73'	Summary		Stadium: Myjava Stadium; Attendance: 1,542; Referee: (Slovakia) Patrik Hrčka

15 September 2012 9	1. FC Tatran Prešov	0 - 0	Košice	Prešov
17:30		Summary		Stadium: Tatran Stadium; Attendance: 2,730; Referee: (Slovakia) Peter Kráľovič

22 September 2012 10	MŠK Žilina	3 - 0	Tatran Prešov	Žilina
17:30	Paur 4'; Nunes 68'; Ceesay 79'	Summary		Stadium: Stadium pod Dubňom; Attendance: 1,712; Referee: (Slovakia) Michal Smolák

29 September 2012 11	Tatran Prešov	2 - 1	FC Spartak Trnava	Prešov
17:30	Shevchuk 16', 54'; Krajník (yellow card) 13' (yellow-red card) 47'	Summary	Sabo 48' (pen.)	Stadium: Tatran Stadium; Attendance: 1,780; Referee: (Slovakia) Ivan Kružliak

6 October 2012 12	Tatran Prešov	0 - 0	Slovan Bratislava	Prešov
14:30		Summary		Stadium: Tatran Stadium; Attendance: 2,250; Referee: (Slovakia) Mário Vlk

20 October 2012 13	FK Senica	2 - 0	1. FC Tatran Prešov	Senica
17:30	Pavlík 57'; Diarrassouba 89'	Summary		Stadium: Stadium FK Senica; Attendance: 1,415; Referee: (Slovakia) Richard Trutz

27 October 2012 14	Tatran Prešov	1 - 2	AS Trenčín	Prešov
14:30	Shevchuk 12'	Summary	Mondek 56'; Štefánik 86'	Stadium: Tatran Stadium; Attendance: 1,026; Referee: (Slovakia) Kamil Horváth

3 November 2012 15	MFK Ružomberok	2 - 0	Tatran Prešov	Ružomberok
14:30		Summary	Mukendi 33'; Serečin 67'	Stadium: Stadium MFK Ružomberok; Attendance: 1,032; Referee: (Slovakia) Vladimír Hracho

10 November 2012 16	Tatran Prešov	1 - 1	Zlaté Moravce	Prešov
14:30	Bortel 77' (o.g.)	Summary	Janič 51'	Stadium: Tatran Stadium; Attendance: 1,035; Referee: (Slovakia) Ján Valášek

17 November 2012 17	FC Nitra	4 - 1	Tatran Prešov	Nitra
14:30	Cléber Guedes de Lima 22', 74'; Mikuš 67', 84'	Summary	Macko 59'	Stadium: Stadium pod Zoborom; Attendance: 450; Referee: (Slovakia) Kamil Horváth

24 November 2012 18	Tatran Prešov	1 - 0	Dukla Banská Bystrica	Prešov
14:30	Lipták 12'	Summary		Stadium: Tatran Stadium; Attendance: 1,145; Referee: (Slovakia) Michal Smolák

1 December 2012 19	Tatran Prešov	2 - 1	Spartak Myjava	Prešov
14:30	Marcin 1'; Petráš 26'	Summary	Harsányi 50'	Stadium: Tatran Stadium; Attendance: 1,181; Referee: (Slovakia) Ivan Kružliak

2 March 2013 20	MFK Košice	3 - 0	Tatran Prešov	Košice
14:30	Diaby 29'; Bukata 79', 83'	Summary		Stadium: Stadium Lokomotívy v Čermeli; Attendance: 4,155; Referee: (Slovakia) Richard Trutz

9 March 2013 21	Tatran Prešov	0 - 0	Žilina	Prešov
14:30		Summary		Stadium: Štadión 1. FC Tatran Prešov; Attendance: 1,780; Referee: (Slovakia) Vladimír Vnuk

16 March 2013 22	Spartak Trnava	2 - 1	Tatran Prešov	Trnava
14:30	Schranz 38'; Kaščák 63'	Summary	Brezinský (yellow card) 24' (yellow-red card) 59'; Petráš 53'	Stadium: Štadión Antona Malatinského; Attendance: 3,424; Referee: (Slovakia) Patrik Hrcka

29 March 2013 23	Slovan Bratislava	5 - 0	Tatran Prešov	Bratislava
17:30	Halenár 8' (pen.) 32'; Hlohovský 39'; Grendel 73', 85'	Summary	Petráš (red card) 6'	Stadium: Štadión Pasienky; Attendance: 863; Referee: (Slovakia) Dušan Sedlák

2 April 2013 24	Tatran Prešov	0 - 1	Senica	Prešov
16:00		Summary	Štepanovský 10'	Stadium: Štadión 1. FC Tatran Prešov; Attendance: 1,050; Referee: (Slovakia) Pavol Chmura

6 April 2013 25	Trenčín	1 - 1	Tatran Prešov	Trenčín
17:30	Mazáň 9'	Summary	Gergel 32'	Stadium: Štadión na Sihoti; Attendance: 2,040; Referee: (Slovakia) Ján Valášek

13 April 2013 26	Tatran Prešov	3 - 1	Ružomberok	Prešov
14:30	Yakovlev 13'; Hruška 62'; Novák 79'	Summary	Ďubek 48'	Stadium: Štadión 1. FC Tatran Prešov; Attendance: 1,350; Referee: (Slovakia) Mário Vlk

20 April 2013 27	Zlaté Moravce	0 - 0	Tatran Prešov	Zlaté Moravce
17:30		Summary	Krob (red card) 10'	Stadium: Štadión FC ViOn; Attendance: 1,126; Referee: (Slovakia) Jozef Pavlík

27 April 2013 28	Tatran Prešov	0 - 1	Nitra	Prešov
14:30		Summary	Struhár 55'	Stadium: Štadión 1. FC Tatran Prešov; Attendance: 1,550; Referee: (Slovakia) Ľubomír Samotný

4 May 2013 29	Banská Bystrica	0 - 0	Tatran Prešov	Banská Bystrica
17:00		Summary	Gergel (yellow card) 36' (yellow-red card) 63'	Stadium: SNP Stadium; Attendance: 1,310; Referee: (Slovakia) Miroslav Jaška

11 May 2013 30	Myjava	2 - 0	Tatran Prešov	Myjava
19:30	Harsányi 36'; Kosík 72'	Summary		Stadium: Stadium Myjava; Attendance: 2,438; Referee: (Slovakia) Richard Trutz

18 May 2013 31	Tatran Prešov	0 - 0	MFK Košice	Prešov
17:30		Summary		Stadium: Štadión 1. FC Tatran Prešov; Attendance: 1,750; Referee: (Slovakia) Mário Vlk

22 May 2013 32	Žilina	0 - 1	Tatran Prešov	Žilina
17:30		Summary	Marcin 36'	Stadium: Stadium pod Dubňom; Attendance: 1,632; Referee: (Slovakia) Ivan Kružliak

26 May 2013 33	Tatran Prešov	0 - 1	Spartak Trnava	Prešov
17:30	Kolbas (red card) 26'	Summary	Vlasko 27' (pen.); Karhan (red card) 53'	Stadium: Štadión 1. FC Tatran Prešov; Attendance: 4,500; Referee: (Hungary) István Vad

Pos	Team	Pld	W	D	L	GF	GA	GD	Pts	Qualification or relegation
8	ViOn Zlaté Moravce	33	11	8	14	42	43	−1	41	
9	Dukla Banská Bystrica	33	9	11	13	28	32	−4	38	
10	Nitra (Note: Nitra was docked three points by the Slovak Football Association (Incident in match between FC Nitra – Spartak Trnava).)	33	11	6	16	39	54	−15	36	
11	Spartak Trnava	33	8	11	14	34	51	−17	35	
12	Tatran Prešov (R)	33	8	9	16	21	41	−20	33	Relegation to 2. liga

Source: Niké liga (in Slovak)
Rules for classification: 1) points; 2) goal difference; 3) number of goals scored.
(R) Relegated

=== Slovnaft Cup ===
29 August 2012 Round of 32	Kalinovo	1 – 3	1. FC Tatran Prešov	Prešov
16:30	Melicher 56'	Summary	Guba 5', 22'; Krajník 35' (pen.)	Stadium: Stadium TJ Baník Kalinovo; Attendance: 1,200; Referee: Michal Perašín

26 September 2012 Round of 16	Tatran Prešov	1 – 1 (3 - 4 pen.)	Ružomberok	Prešov
16:30	Marcin 82'	Summary	Mukendi 86'	Stadium: Tatran Stadium; Attendance: 1,140; Referee: Miroslav Jaška

Sources: soccerway.com, UEFA.com
