= List of Slovak football transfers winter 2012–13 =

This is a list of Slovak football transfers in the winter transfer window 2012–13 by club. Only transfers of the Corgoň Liga and 2. liga are included.

== Corgoň Liga ==
=== ŠK Slovan Bratislava ===
In: Note: Flags indicate national team as defined under FIFA eligibility rules; some limited exceptions apply. Players may hold more than one non-FIFA nationality.

No.	Pos.	Nation	Player
—	MF	GUI	Seydouba Soumah (from FC Nitra)
—	FW	SVK	Marek Kuzma (loan return from (Czech Republic) 1. FC Slovácko)
—	MF	SVK	Radoslav Augustín (loan return from FK Dukla Banská Bystrica)
—	GK	SVK	Martin Polaček (from FK DAC 1904 Dunajská Streda)

Out: Note: Flags indicate national team as defined under FIFA eligibility rules; some limited exceptions apply. Players may hold more than one non-FIFA nationality.

No.	Pos.	Nation	Player
12	FW	SVK	Karol Mészáros (on loan to FC ViOn Zlaté Moravce)
28	FW	ARG	Leandro Ledesma (End of contract and he joined to (Chile) San Luis de Quillota)
29	DF	CZE	Milan Kopic (End of contract and he joined to (Czech Republic) FC Vysočina Jihlava)
33	FW	SVK	Filip Šebo (End of contract)
—	MF	SVK	Radoslav Augustín (on loan to 1. FC Tatran Prešov)
—	FW	SVK	Boris Turčák (on loan to FC Nitra)
—	DF	SVK	Martin Vrablec (on loan to ŠK SFM Senec)
—	MF	SVK	Juraj Kuráň (on loan to FK DAC 1904 Dunajská Streda)
—	GK	SVK	Martin Polaček (on loan to FK DAC 1904 Dunajská Streda)

=== FC ViOn Zlaté Moravce ===
In: Note: Flags indicate national team as defined under FIFA eligibility rules; some limited exceptions apply. Players may hold more than one non-FIFA nationality.

No.	Pos.	Nation	Player
—	FW	SVK	Karol Mészáros (on loan from ŠK Slovan Bratislava)
—	FW	SVK	Ladislav Žák (loan return from AFC Nové Mesto nad Váhom)
—	MF	SVK	Juraj Tomášek (loan return from ŠK SFM Senec)
—	MF	SVK	Milan Škriniar (on loan from MŠK Žilina)
—	DF	SVK	Marcel Ondráš (on loan from MŠK Žilina)

Out: Note: Flags indicate national team as defined under FIFA eligibility rules; some limited exceptions apply. Players may hold more than one non-FIFA nationality.

No.	Pos.	Nation	Player
2	MF	SVK	Milan Pavlovič (Released and he joined to PFK Piešťany)
13	DF	SVK	Milan Bortel (to (Czech Republic) SK Slavia Prague)
24	MF	SVK	Adam Žilák (loan return to MŠK Žilina)
25	MF	SVK	Lukáš Janič (to (Czech Republic) FK Teplice)
26	MF	SVK	Michal Škvarka (loan return to MŠK Žilina)
30	GK	SVK	Martin Matlák (loan return to ŠK SFM Senec)

=== FK Senica ===
In: Note: Flags indicate national team as defined under FIFA eligibility rules; some limited exceptions apply. Players may hold more than one non-FIFA nationality.

No.	Pos.	Nation	Player
—	FW	CZE	Petr Hošek (loan return from FK DAC 1904 Dunajská Streda)
—	GK	SVK	Michal Šulla (loan return from Spartak Myjava)
—	DF	SVK	Ivan Hladík (loan return from TJ Baník Ružiná)
—	DF	SVK	Miroslav Sedlák (loan return from FC ŠTK 1914 Šamorín)
—	MF	CZE	Milan Jirásek (on loan from (Czech Republic) AC Sparta Prague)
—	DF	SVK	Patrik Mráz (from Free Agent)
—	FW	CZE	Tomáš Vrťo (from (Czech Republic) FC Baník Ostrava)

Out: Note: Flags indicate national team as defined under FIFA eligibility rules; some limited exceptions apply. Players may hold more than one non-FIFA nationality.

No.	Pos.	Nation	Player
2	DF	CZE	Miroslav Štěpánek (Released and he joined to (Germany) MSV Duisburg II)
16	FW	CZE	Adam Varadi (loan return to (Czech Republic) SK Sigma Olomouc)
24	DF	CZE	Václav Koutný (loan return to (Czech Republic) SK Sigma Olomouc)
26	MF	CZE	Jaroslav Černý (on loan to (Czech Republic) SK Dynamo České Budějovice)
28	DF	CZE	Martin Frýdek (loan return to (Czech Republic) AC Sparta Prague)
30	GK	SVK	Ján Malec (on loan to FK DAC 1904 Dunajská Streda)
—	DF	SVK	Miroslav Sedlák (on loan to FK DAC 1904 Dunajská Streda)
—	FW	CZE	Petr Hošek (extended loan to FK DAC 1904 Dunajská Streda)
—	DF	SVK	Ivan Hladík (extended loan to TJ Baník Ružiná)

=== MFK Košice ===
In: Note: Flags indicate national team as defined under FIFA eligibility rules; some limited exceptions apply. Players may hold more than one non-FIFA nationality.

No.	Pos.	Nation	Player
—	FW	SVK	Matúš Digoň (Loan return from FC Lokomotíva Košice)

Out: Note: Flags indicate national team as defined under FIFA eligibility rules; some limited exceptions apply. Players may hold more than one non-FIFA nationality.

No.	Pos.	Nation	Player
—	FW	SVK	Dávid Škutka (to (Czech Republic) SK Slavia Praha)
—	FW	SVK	Ján Novák (loan return to MŠK Žilina)
—	DF	SVK	Juraj Chupač (loan return to MŠK Žilina)
—	FW	SVK	Tomáš Kubík (on loan to MŠK Rimavská Sobota)
—	FW	SVK	Matúš Digoň (Released)
—	FW	SVK	Róbert Ujčík (on loan to ŠK SFM Senec)
—	MF	SVK	Kamil Kuzma (on loan to ŠK SFM Senec)

=== MŠK Žilina ===
In: Note: Flags indicate national team as defined under FIFA eligibility rules; some limited exceptions apply. Players may hold more than one non-FIFA nationality.

No.	Pos.	Nation	Player
—	DF	SVK	Juraj Chupač (loan return from MFK Košice)
—	MF	SVK	Michal Škvarka (loan return from FC ViOn Zlaté Moravce)
—	FW	SVK	Dávid Guba (on loan from 1. FC Tatran Prešov)
—	DF	GAM	Ali Ceesay (loan return from FC ŠTK 1914 Šamorín)
—	DF	SVK	Martin Kubena (loan return from MFK Tatran Liptovský Mikuláš)
—	DF	SVK	Dominik Fotyik (loan return from (Hungary) Kazincbarcikai SC)
—	GK	SVK	Matej Rakovan (loan return from (Czech Republic) MFK Karviná)
—	FW	SVK	Ján Novák (loan return from MFK Košice)
—	MF	SVK	Michal Mravec (from (Netherlands) FC Emmen)
—	FW	SVK	Tomáš Majtán (loan return from (Czech Republic) FC Baník Ostrava)
—	MF	SVK	Adam Žilák (loan return from FC ViOn Zlaté Moravce)

Out: Note: Flags indicate national team as defined under FIFA eligibility rules; some limited exceptions apply. Players may hold more than one non-FIFA nationality.

No.	Pos.	Nation	Player
18	FW	GAM	Momodou Ceesay (to (Kazakhstan) FC Kairat)
20	MF	SVK	Peter Šulek (on loan to Spartak Myjava)
21	FW	POR	Guima (Released and he joined to (Portugal) U.D. Oliveirense)
—	GK	SVK	Matej Rakovan (on loan to (Czech Republic) SK Slavia Praha)
—	DF	SVK	Dominik Fotyik (on return to (Hungary) Kazincbarcikai SC)
—	DF	SVK	Martin Kubena (on loan to MFK Tatran Liptovský Mikuláš)
—	DF	SVK	Michal Janec (to (Czech Republic) FC Slovan Liberec)
3	MF	SVK	Milan Škriniar (on loan to FC ViOn Zlaté Moravce)
—	MF	SVK	Roman Gergel (on loan to 1. FC Tatran Prešov)
—	FW	SVK	Ján Novák (to MŠK Žilina)
—	DF	SVK	Marcel Ondráš (on loan to FC ViOn Zlaté Moravce)
—	FW	PER	Jean Deza (to (Peru) CD Universidad San Martín)

=== AS Trenčín ===
In: Note: Flags indicate national team as defined under FIFA eligibility rules; some limited exceptions apply. Players may hold more than one non-FIFA nationality.

No.	Pos.	Nation	Player
—	MF	SVK	Adam Morong (loan return from MFK Tatran Liptovský Mikuláš)
—	FW	SVK	Tomáš Malec (loan return from MFK Tatran Liptovský Mikuláš)
—	DF	SVK	René Šiko (loan return from FK Slovan Nemšová)
—	FW	BRA	William (from (Brazil) Botafogo)
—	FW	SVK	Tomáš Brigant (from MFK Dubnica)
—	FW	NGR	Yakubu Alfa (from (Cyprus) AEK Larnaca)

Out: Note: Flags indicate national team as defined under FIFA eligibility rules; some limited exceptions apply. Players may hold more than one non-FIFA nationality.

No.	Pos.	Nation	Player
10	FW	ARG	David Depetris (End of contract and he joined to (Turkey) Çaykur Rizespor)
—	FW	SVK	Tomáš Malec (Extended loan to MFK Tatran Liptovský Mikuláš)
21	DF	SVK	Boris Godál (to (Poland) Zagłębie Lubin)
—	FW	SVK	Gabriel Bezák (on loan to FK Slovan Nemšová)
—	DF	SVK	René Šiko (on loan to AFC Nové Mesto nad Váhom)
—	MF	SVK	Adam Morong (on loan to PFK Piešťany)
—	GK	SVK	Igor Šemrinec (on loan to AFC Nové Mesto nad Váhom)

=== MFK Ružomberok ===
In: Note: Flags indicate national team as defined under FIFA eligibility rules; some limited exceptions apply. Players may hold more than one non-FIFA nationality.

No.	Pos.	Nation	Player
—	MF	MKD	Dejan Peševski (from (Bulgaria) Hristo Stoichkov Academy)

Out: Note: Flags indicate national team as defined under FIFA eligibility rules; some limited exceptions apply. Players may hold more than one non-FIFA nationality.

No.	Pos.	Nation	Player
2	MF	KEN	Patrick Oboya (to (Vietnam) Becamex Binh Duong F.C.)
3	MF	SVK	Mikuláš Bumbera (on loan to ŠKM Liptovský Hrádok)
9	FW	SVK	Tomáš Gerát (on loan to FK DAC 1904 Dunajská Streda)
18	FW	SVK	Štefan Gerec (on loan to FK DAC 1904 Dunajská Streda)
—	DF	SVK	Michal Kutlík (on loan to FK DAC 1904 Dunajská Streda)

=== 1. FC Tatran Prešov ===
In: Note: Flags indicate national team as defined under FIFA eligibility rules; some limited exceptions apply. Players may hold more than one non-FIFA nationality.

No.	Pos.	Nation	Player
—	MF	SVK	Ľubomír Ivanko-Macej (loan return from Partizán Bardejov)
—	FW	SVK	Michal Kamenčík (loan return from MŠK Rimavská Sobota)
—	DF	CZE	Jan Krob (from (Czech Republic) AC Sparta Prague)
—	DF	SVK	Miloš Brezinský (from (Kazakhstan) FC Akzhayik)
—	MF	SVK	Radoslav Augustín (on loan from ŠK Slovan Bratislava)
—	FW	NGR	Peter Nworah (from (Spain) CD Atlético Baleares)
—	MF	SVK	Roman Gergel (on loan from MŠK Žilina)
—	FW	SVK	Ján Novák (from MŠK Žilina)

Out: Note: Flags indicate national team as defined under FIFA eligibility rules; some limited exceptions apply. Players may hold more than one non-FIFA nationality.

No.	Pos.	Nation	Player
6	MF	SVK	Viliam Macko (on loan to MFK Dolný Kubín)
7	MF	SVK	Marián Adam (on loan to MŠK Rimavská Sobota)
11	MF	SVK	Peter Katona (on loan to MŠK Rimavská Sobota)
18	MF	SVK	Štefan Zošák (loan return to MŠK Žilina)
20	MF	SVK	Martin Pribula (on loan to MŠK Rimavská Sobota)
22	FW	UKR	Andriy Shevchuk (Released)
25	DF	SVK	Jozef Adámik (End of contract and he joined to FK Dukla Banská Bystrica)
29	FW	SVK	Dávid Guba (on loan to MŠK Žilina)
77	DF	MNE	Dejan Boljević (Released and he joined to (Serbia) FK Novi Pazar)
99	MF	BRA	Rafael Torres (Released)
—	FW	NGR	Peter Nworah (on loan to Partizán Bardejov)

=== Spartak Myjava ===
In: Note: Flags indicate national team as defined under FIFA eligibility rules; some limited exceptions apply. Players may hold more than one non-FIFA nationality.

No.	Pos.	Nation	Player
—	DF	SVK	Marcel Onder (loan return from OTJ Moravany nad Váhom)
—	DF	SVK	Peter Kumančík (loan return from MFK Vrbové)
—	MF	SVK	Peter Šulek (on loan from MŠK Žilina)
—	MF	SVK	Lukáš Pelegríni (from FC ŠTK 1914 Šamorín)
—	FW	SVK	Ľubomír Urgela (from PFK Piešťany)
—	MF	CZE	Erik Daniel (on loan from (Czech Republic) FC Slovan Liberec)
26	FW	SVK	Peter Sládek (from (Czech Republic) 1. FC Slovácko)

Out: Note: Flags indicate national team as defined under FIFA eligibility rules; some limited exceptions apply. Players may hold more than one non-FIFA nationality.

No.	Pos.	Nation	Player
4	DF	SVK	Daniel Kvasnica (Released)
5	DF	SVK	Peter Majerník (Released and he joined FK DAC 1904 Dunajská Streda)
8	MF	SVK	Michal Dian (Released)
17	MF	SVK	Ján Petráš (loan return to Spartak Trnava)
23	FW	SVK	Matúš Jorík (to (Austria) ASK Kottingbrunn)
26	FW	SVK	Peter Sládek (loan return to (Czech Republic) 1. FC Slovácko)
27	FW	SVK	Lukáš Šebek (Released and he joined to (Austria) SV Leobendorf)
28	GK	SVK	Michal Šulla (loan return to FK Senica)
—	MF	SVK	Ondrej Neoveský (on loan to ŠK SFM Senec)

=== FK Dukla Banská Bystrica ===
In: Note: Flags indicate national team as defined under FIFA eligibility rules; some limited exceptions apply. Players may hold more than one non-FIFA nationality.

No.	Pos.	Nation	Player
—	MF	SVK	Július Chomistek (loan return from TJ Baník Ružiná)
—	DF	SVK	Jozef Adámik (from 1. FC Tatran Prešov)
—	DF	BRA	Dionatan Teixeira (on loan from TJ Slovan Čeľadice)
—	FW	CZE	Pavel Vrána (from MFK Karviná)
—	FW	SVK	Michal Peňaška (on loan from ŠK Slovan Bratislava)

Out: Note: Flags indicate national team as defined under FIFA eligibility rules; some limited exceptions apply. Players may hold more than one non-FIFA nationality.

No.	Pos.	Nation	Player
2	DF	SVK	Peter Chrappan (to (Malaysia) Selangor FA)
8	FW	UKR	Viktor Sakhniuk (End of contract)
16	MF	SVK	Radoslav Augustín (loan return to ŠK Slovan Bratislava)
17	FW	SVK	Milan Ferenčík (loan return to (Czech Republic) FC Baník Ostrava)
25	FW	SVK	Martin Matúš (Released)
—	MF	SVK	Július Chomistek (on loan to MFK Tatran Liptovský Mikuláš)
31	GK	SVK	Branislav Pindroch (to (Czech Republic) MFK Karviná)

=== FC Nitra ===
In: Note: Flags indicate national team as defined under FIFA eligibility rules; some limited exceptions apply. Players may hold more than one non-FIFA nationality.

No.	Pos.	Nation	Player
—	DF	SVK	Róbert Cicman (on loan from (Czech Republic) SK Slavia Prague)
—	MF	CMR	Léandre Tawamba (from (South Africa) Mpumalanga Black Aces F.C.)
—	DF	SRB	Miloš Obradović (from Free Agent)
—	MF	SVK	Martin Jackuliak (on loan from ŠK Slovan Bratislava)
—	FW	SVK	Boris Turčák (on loan from ŠK Slovan Bratislava)
—	FW	SVK	Henrich Benčík (from Free Agent)
—	MF	CZE	Lukáš Kutra (from (Czech Republic) FC Fastav Zlín)
—	MF	SVK	Štefan Zošák (on loan from MŠK Žilina)

Out: Note: Flags indicate national team as defined under FIFA eligibility rules; some limited exceptions apply. Players may hold more than one non-FIFA nationality.

No.	Pos.	Nation	Player
3	DF	SVK	Marek Szabó (loan return to FK Chotín)
7	MF	SVK	Ľuboš Kolár (to TBC)
9	FW	SVK	Matúš Mikuš (to (Austria) FC Admira Wacker Mödling)
15	MF	SVK	Andrej Ivančík (on loan to FK Slovan Duslo Šaľa)
17	DF	SVK	Lukáš Zelenický (to (Austria) DSG Union Perg)
19	FW	SVK	Arnold Šimonek (to (Czech Republic) FC Vysočina Jihlava)
21	FW	CZE	Karel Kroupa (Released)
23	MF	GUI	Seydouba Soumah (to ŠK Slovan Bratislava)
24	FW	SVK	Matúš Paukner (on loan to Partizán Bardejov)
—	DF	SVK	Michal Poluch (loan return to FK TEMPO Partizánske)
—	MF	CZE	Filip Bakule (to (Czech Republic) FC MAS Táborsko)

=== FC Spartak Trnava ===
In: Note: Flags indicate national team as defined under FIFA eligibility rules; some limited exceptions apply. Players may hold more than one non-FIFA nationality.

No.	Pos.	Nation	Player
—	FW	SVK	Ivan Lietava (from (Ukraine) FC Vorskla Poltava)
—	MF	SVK	Ivan Hodúr (from (Poland) Zagłębie Lubin)
—	DF	SVK	Martin Klabník (from MFK Dubnica)
—	MF	SVK	Oliver Augustini (from MFK Dubnica)
—	DF	SRB	Srdjan Grabež (on loan from MFK Dubnica)
—	GK	SVK	Jakub Jakubov (on loan from FK Slavoj Žatec)

Out: Note: Flags indicate national team as defined under FIFA eligibility rules; some limited exceptions apply. Players may hold more than one non-FIFA nationality.

No.	Pos.	Nation	Player
2	DF	SVK	Peter Čvirik (Released and joined (Czech Republic) FC Vysočina Jihlava)
3	MF	CZE	Vlastimil Stožický (On loan to (Czech Republic) FC Baník Ostrava)
5	DF	CZE	Jiří Koubský (Released and he joined to (Switzerland) FC Aarau)
18	DF	SVK	Ľuboš Hanzel (End of contract and he joined to (Poland) Jagiellonia Białystok)
33	MF	SVK	Michal Gašparík (on loan to FK DAC 1904 Dunajská Streda)
—	DF	SEN	Djiby Ba (on loan to MFK Dubnica)
—	MF	SVK	Christián Steinhübel (on loan to MFK Dubnica)
—	GK	SVK	Jakub Jakubov (loan return to FK Slavoj Žatec)
—	DF	CZE	Patrik Gross (Released)
—	MF	SVK	Mário Bicák (Released)

== 2. liga ==
=== ŽP Šport Podbrezová ===
In: Note: Flags indicate national team as defined under FIFA eligibility rules; some limited exceptions apply. Players may hold more than one non-FIFA nationality.

No.	Pos.	Nation	Player
—	GK	SVK	Juraj Baláž (from (Poland) Polonia Bytom)
—	FW	SVK	Lukáš Laksík (on loan from FK Dukla Banská Bystrica)

Out: Note: Flags indicate national team as defined under FIFA eligibility rules; some limited exceptions apply. Players may hold more than one non-FIFA nationality.

No.	Pos.	Nation	Player
—	FW	SVK	Július Gombala (on loan to TJ Baník Ružiná)
—	GK	SVK	Patrik Gábriš (loan return to FK JUPIE Banská Bystrica - Podlavice)
—	MF	SVK	Michal Cmarko (on loan to FC Baník Horná Nitra)
—	FW	SVK	Ľubomír Rusnák (loan return to FK Slavoj Trebišov)

=== FK DAC 1904 Dunajská Streda ===
In: Note: Flags indicate national team as defined under FIFA eligibility rules; some limited exceptions apply. Players may hold more than one non-FIFA nationality.

No.	Pos.	Nation	Player
—	FW	SVK	Tomáš Gerát (on loan from MFK Ružomberok)
—	FW	SVK	Štefan Gerec (on loan from MFK Ružomberok)
—	FW	SVK	Petr Hošek (extended loan from FK Senica)
—	DF	SVK	Michal Kutlík (on loan from MFK Ružomberok)
—	DF	SVK	Marek Božoň (from MFK Dubnica)
—	DF	SVK	Lukáš Beňo (from MFK Dubnica)
—	GK	SVK	Ján Malec (on loan from FK Senica)
—	DF	SVK	Miroslav Sedlák (on loan from FK Senica)
—	FW	CZE	Petr Hošek (extended loan from FK Senica)
—	MF	SVK	Michal Gašparík (on loan from FC Spartak Trnava)
—	DF	SVK	Peter Majerník (on loan from Spartak Myjava)
—	MF	SVK	Juraj Kuráň (on loan from ŠK Slovan Bratislava)
—	MF	SVK	Goran Antunovič (on loan from KFC Komárno)
—	GK	SVK	Martin Poláček (on loan from ŠK Slovan Bratislava)
—	FW	SVK	Patrik Johancsik (extended loan from FK Dukla Banská Bystrica)

Out: Note: Flags indicate national team as defined under FIFA eligibility rules; some limited exceptions apply. Players may hold more than one non-FIFA nationality.

No.	Pos.	Nation	Player
—	FW	CZE	Petr Hošek (loan return to FK Senica)
—	DF	SVK	Patrik Banovič (loan return to Spartak Trnava)
—	DF	SVK	Marián Had (to (Hungary) Győri ETO FC)
—	GK	SVK	Martin Polaček (to ŠK Slovan Bratislava)
—	DF	SVK	Jan Marcin (Released)
—	DF	BIH	Ilija Prodanović (Released)
—	MF	SVK	Peter Fieber (Released)
—	DF	CZE	Radim Diviš (loan return to (Czech Republic) MFK Karviná)
—	DF	SVK	Zsolt Németh (on loan to KFC Komárno)
—	FW	SVK	Patrik Johancsik (loan return to FK Dukla Banská Bystrica)
—	DF	CZE	Miroslav Hozda (to (Czech Republic) FK Varnsdorf)
—	MF	CRO	Darijo Pecirep (to (Austria) SV Wallern)
—	FW	SVK	Árpád Csonka (on loan to KFC Komárno)
—	MF	SVK	Norbert Csölle (on loan to MŠK - Thermál Veľký Meder)
—	DF	SVK	Tibor Ravasz (on loan to TJ Poľnohospodár - Trhová Hradská)

=== ŠK SFM Senec ===
In: Note: Flags indicate national team as defined under FIFA eligibility rules; some limited exceptions apply. Players may hold more than one non-FIFA nationality.

No.	Pos.	Nation	Player
—	GK	SVK	Martin Matlák (loan return from FC ViOn Zlaté Moravce)
—	FW	SVK	Róbert Ujčík (on loan from MFK Košice)
—	MF	SVK	Jaroslav Hílek (on loan from (Czech Republic) FK Viktoria Žižkov)
—	DF	SVK	Martin Vrablec (on loan from ŠK Slovan Bratislava)
—	MF	SVK	Ondrej Neoveský (on loan from Spartak Myjava)
—	MF	SVK	Pavol Orolín (on loan from (Czech Republic) Bohemians 1905)
—	MF	SVK	Martin Železník (on loan from Spartak Trnava)
—	FW	SVK	Ľubomír Gogolák (extended loan from Spartak Trnava)
—	MF	SVK	Kamil Kuzma (on loan from MFK Košice)

Out: Note: Flags indicate national team as defined under FIFA eligibility rules; some limited exceptions apply. Players may hold more than one non-FIFA nationality.

No.	Pos.	Nation	Player
—	FW	SVK	Ľubomír Gogolák (loan return to Spartak Trnava)
—	FW	SVK	Michal Peňaška (loan return to ŠK Slovan Bratislava)
—	MF	SVK	Juraj Tomášek (loan return to FC ViOn Zlaté Moravce)
—	GK	SVK	Patrik Milošovič (on loan to ŠK Blava Jaslovské Bohunice)
—	MF	SVK	Peter Štalmach (loan return to MŠK Žilina)
—	MF	SVK	Filip Chromý (Released)
—	MF	SVK	Andrej Krátky (Released)
—	DF	SVK	Martin Mravec (Released)

=== FK Slovan Duslo Šaľa ===
In: Note: Flags indicate national team as defined under FIFA eligibility rules; some limited exceptions apply. Players may hold more than one non-FIFA nationality.

No.	Pos.	Nation	Player
—	MF	SVK	Andrej Ivančík (on loan from FC Nitra)

Out: Note: Flags indicate national team as defined under FIFA eligibility rules; some limited exceptions apply. Players may hold more than one non-FIFA nationality.

No.	Pos.	Nation	Player
—	MF	SVK	Eduard Gajdoš (Loan return to FC Nitra)
—	MF	SVK	Štefan Lalák (on loan to OTJ Palárikovo)
—	MF	SVK	Oskár Lancz (on loan to OTJ Palárikovo)
—	FW	SVK	Csaba Takács (on loan to FK Vlčany)
—	DF	SVK	Adrián Mészáros (on loan to FK Močenok)

=== Partizán Bardejov ===
In: Note: Flags indicate national team as defined under FIFA eligibility rules; some limited exceptions apply. Players may hold more than one non-FIFA nationality.

No.	Pos.	Nation	Player
—	MF	SVK	Patrik Liček (loan return from ŠK Milénium Bardejovská Nová Ves)
—	MF	SVK	Tomáš Kiseľ (loan return from ŠK Milénium Bardejovská Nová Ves)
—	FW	SVK	Miroslav Bučko (from FK Drustav Svidník)
—	FW	SVK	Matúš Paukner (on loan from FC Nitra)
—	MF	SVK	Ján Zápotoka (from FK - Drustav - SK - Hrabovčík)
—	FW	NGR	Peter Nworah (on loan from 1. FC Tatran Prešov)
—	MF	SVK	Juraj Kuhajdík (from (Malaysia) Kuala Lumpur FA)
—	DF	SVK	Vladislav Palša (from (Malaysia) Kuala Lumpur FA)
—	MF	BRA	Dyjan (from FK Bodva Moldava nad Bodvou)

Out: Note: Flags indicate national team as defined under FIFA eligibility rules; some limited exceptions apply. Players may hold more than one non-FIFA nationality.

No.	Pos.	Nation	Player
—	MF	SVK	Juraj Kuhajdík (to (Malaysia) Kuala Lumpur FA)
—	DF	SVK	Vladislav Palša (to (Malaysia) Kuala Lumpur FA)
—	MF	SVK	Ľubomír Ivanko-Macej (loan return to 1. FC Tatran Prešov)
—	FW	SVK	Martin Dupkala (loan return to 1. FC Tatran Prešov)
—	MF	SVK	Patrik Liček (extended loan to ŠK Milénium Bardejovská Nová Ves)
—	MF	SVK	Tomáš Kiseľ (extended loan to ŠK Milénium Bardejovská Nová Ves)
—	MF	BRA	Dyjan (loan return to FK Bodva Moldava nad Bodvou)

=== MFK Dubnica ===
In: Note: Flags indicate national team as defined under FIFA eligibility rules; some limited exceptions apply. Players may hold more than one non-FIFA nationality.

No.	Pos.	Nation	Player
—	DF	SEN	Djiby Ba (on loan from FC Spartak Trnava)
—	MF	SVK	Christián Steinhübel (on loan from FC Spartak Trnava)
—	MF	SVK	Michal Dolinajec (on loan from MFK Dolný Kubín)
—	DF	CRO	Petar Bašić (on loan from FK Podkonice)
—	MF	SRB	Ivan Mejić (on loan from FK Podkonice)

Out: Note: Flags indicate national team as defined under FIFA eligibility rules; some limited exceptions apply. Players may hold more than one non-FIFA nationality.

No.	Pos.	Nation	Player
—	MF	SVK	Oliver Augustini (to FC Spartak Trnava)
—	DF	SVK	Martin Klabník (to FC Spartak Trnava)
—	DF	SRB	Srdjan Grabež (on loan to FC Spartak Trnava)
—	FW	SVK	Tomáš Brigant (to AS Trenčín)
—	DF	SVK	Marek Božoň (to FK DAC 1904 Dunajská Streda)
—	DF	SVK	Lukáš Beňo (to FK DAC 1904 Dunajská Streda)
—	MF	SVK	Andrej Urban (to FC ŠTK 1914 Šamorín)
—	DF	SVK	Miloš Šupák (to ŠKF Sereď)
—	MF	SVK	Filip Vavrík (on loan to OTJ Moravany nad Váhom)
—	DF	SVK	Juraj Masárik (to TJ ISKRA Borčice)
—	GK	SVK	Andrej Kukuliaš (on loan to TJ ISKRA Borčice)
—	MF	SVK	Filip Behan (to MFK Nová Dubnica)
—	MF	SVK	Matej Loduha (loan return to FK Púchov)

=== MFK Zemplín Michalovce ===
In: Note: Flags indicate national team as defined under FIFA eligibility rules; some limited exceptions apply. Players may hold more than one non-FIFA nationality.

No.	Pos.	Nation	Player
—	MF	SVK	Miroslav Božok (from (Poland) GKS Bełchatów)
—	MF	SVK	Vladimír Janočko (from (Austria) FC Leopoldsdorf)
—	DF	SVK	Stanislav Smrek (from (Czech Republic) FK MAS Táborsko)
—	MF	RUS	Denis Mukhametdinov (from (Russia) FC KAMAZ Naberezhnye Chelny)
—	FW	ESP	Juanpe (from (Spain) CD Atlético Baleares)

Out: Note: Flags indicate national team as defined under FIFA eligibility rules; some limited exceptions apply. Players may hold more than one non-FIFA nationality.

No.	Pos.	Nation	Player
—	DF	CRO	Milan Krmpotić (Released)
3	DF	SVK	Ján Čarnota (Released and he joined to (Czech Republic) SFC Opava)
21	MF	FRA	Kevin Garel (Released and he joined to (France) UJA Maccabi Paris Métropole)
—	FW	SVK	Oliver Špilár (to (Czech Republic) Bohemians 1905)
—	GK	SVK	Jozef Brudňak (on loan to 1. HFC Humenné)
—	MF	SVK	Marek Mihok (on loan to 1. HFC Humenné)

=== FC ŠTK 1914 Šamorín ===
In: Note: Flags indicate national team as defined under FIFA eligibility rules; some limited exceptions apply. Players may hold more than one non-FIFA nationality.

No.	Pos.	Nation	Player
—	DF	SRB	Miloš Javorina (from (Serbia) FK Seljak Mihajlovac)
—	MF	SRB	Danijel Savić (from (Serbia) FK PKB Padinska Skela)
—	MF	SRB	Miograd Jovanović (from ŽP Šport Podbrezová)
—	MF	SRB	Lazar Cvejić (from ŽP Šport Podbrezová)
—	FW	CMR	Serge Messie Tanguy (from (South Africa) Ikapa Sporting F.C.)
—	MF	SVK	Denis Jančovič (loan return from OFK Bošany)
—	MF	SVK	Michal Cmarko (on loan from FC Baník Horná Nitra)
—	MF	SVK	Lukáš Čemba (from PŠC Pezinok)
—	MF	SVK	Andrej Urban (from MFK Dubnica)

Out: Note: Flags indicate national team as defined under FIFA eligibility rules; some limited exceptions apply. Players may hold more than one non-FIFA nationality.

No.	Pos.	Nation	Player
—	DF	GAM	Ali Ceesay (loan return to MŠK Žilina)
—	DF	SVK	Miroslav Sedlák (loan return to FK Senica)
—	DF	SVK	Marek Kopúň (loan return to FK AS Trenčín)
—	MF	SVK	Balázs Borbély (End of professional career)
—	MF	POL	Konrad Mateusz Gilewicz (to (Poland) Flota Świnoujście)
—	FW	SVK	Tomáš Čermák (loan return to FK ŠKP Inter Dúbravka Bratislava)

=== MFK Dolný Kubín ===
In: Note: Flags indicate national team as defined under FIFA eligibility rules; some limited exceptions apply. Players may hold more than one non-FIFA nationality.

No.	Pos.	Nation	Player
—	DF	SVK	Jozef Demko (from OŠK Lisková)
—	MF	POL	Daniel Mateusz Pyrka (from PFK Piešťany)
—	GK	SVK	Tomáš Pažitka (on loan from MFK Ružomberok)
—	MF	SVK	Vladimír Jašica (loan return from Oravan Oravská Jasenica)
—	MF	SVK	Radoslav Trnovec (loan return from ŽP Šport Podbrezová)
—	MF	SVK	Rastislav Bakala (from (Czech Republic) SK Dynamo České Budějovice)
—	FW	NIG	Siradji Sani (from FK Slovan Most pri Bratislave)
—	MF	SVK	Viliam Macko (on loan from 1. FC Tatran Prešov)
—	MF	SVK	Jakub Hronec (from (Czech Republic) SK Dynamo České Budějovice)
—	FW	SRB	Mirko Andrić (from (Serbia) FK Jedinstvo Ub)
—	FW	SVK	Tomáš Kubica (on loan from FK Čadca)

Out: Note: Flags indicate national team as defined under FIFA eligibility rules; some limited exceptions apply. Players may hold more than one non-FIFA nationality.

No.	Pos.	Nation	Player
—	FW	SVK	Róbert Ujčík (loan return to MFK Košice and he joined to ŠK SFM Senec)
—	MF	SVK	Milan Sirota (loan return to ŠK Tvrdošín)
—	FW	SVK	Tomáš Chovanec (to (Malaysia) Betaria FC)
—	MF	SRB	Milomir Sivčević (on loan to MŠK Rimavská Sobota)
—	FW	SVK	Marek Sojka (to TJ Družstevník Oravská Poruba)

=== MŠK Rimavská Sobota ===
In: Note: Flags indicate national team as defined under FIFA eligibility rules; some limited exceptions apply. Players may hold more than one non-FIFA nationality.

No.	Pos.	Nation	Player
—	FW	SVK	Tomáš Kubík (on loan from MFK Košice)
—	MF	SVK	Peter Katona (on loan from 1. FC Tatran Prešov)
—	MF	SVK	Martin Pribula (on loan from 1. FC Tatran Prešov)
—	DF	SRB	Milomir Sivčević (on loan from MFK Dolný Kubín)
—	MF	SVK	Tomáš Labun (on loan from MFK Tatran Liptovský Mikuláš)

Out: Note: Flags indicate national team as defined under FIFA eligibility rules; some limited exceptions apply. Players may hold more than one non-FIFA nationality.

No.	Pos.	Nation	Player
—	FW	SVK	Michal Kamenčík (loan return to 1. FC Tatran Prešov)
—	MF	SVK	Jozef Čertík (loan return to (Czech Republic) FK Čáslav and he joined to (Poland) Sandecja Nowy Sącz)

=== MFK Tatran Liptovský Mikuláš ===
In: Note: Flags indicate national team as defined under FIFA eligibility rules; some limited exceptions apply. Players may hold more than one non-FIFA nationality.

No.	Pos.	Nation	Player
—	DF	SVK	Dušan Kucharčík (on loan from MŠK Žilina)
—	MF	SVK	René Revák (on loan from MŠK Žilina)
—	MF	SVK	Miroslav Blaščík (from TJ Družba Smrečany - Žiar)
—	FW	SVK	Peter Tomko (loan return from FC Družstevník Liptovská Štiavnica)
—	DF	SVK	Martin Kubena (extended loan from MŠK Žilina)
—	FW	SVK	Tomáš Malec (Extended loan from MŠK Žilina)
—	FW	SVK	Miroslav Latiak (from (Myanmar) Ayeyawady United F.C.)
—	MF	SVK	Július Chomistek (on loan from FK Dukla Banská Bystrica)
—	MF	SVK	Martin Trnovský (on loan from FC 34 Liptovský Mikuláš - Palúdzka)

Out: Note: Flags indicate national team as defined under FIFA eligibility rules; some limited exceptions apply. Players may hold more than one non-FIFA nationality.

No.	Pos.	Nation	Player
—	DF	SVK	Martin Kubena (loan return to MŠK Žilina)
—	MF	SVK	Adam Morong (loan return to AS Trenčín)
—	FW	SVK	Tomáš Malec (loan return to AS Trenčín)
—	DF	SVK	Michal Janec (loan return to MŠK Žilina B)
—	DF	SVK	Tomáš Labun (Released)
—	DF	SVK	Miroslav Daško (loan return to FK Poprad)
—	FW	SVK	Peter Rezer (Released)
—	MF	SVK	Dárius Popik (loan return to MFK Košice B)
—	DF	SVK	Peter Ďungel (loan return to MŠK Žilina)

=== FK Baník Ružiná ===
Note: Flags indicate national team as defined under FIFA eligibility rules; some limited exceptions apply. Players may hold more than one non-FIFA nationality.

No.	Pos.	Nation	Player
—	FW	SVK	Július Gombala (on loan from ŽP Šport Podbrezová)
—	FW	COD	Elvis Mashike Sukisa (from FC Slovan Galanta)
—	DF	SVK	Miroslav Daško (on loan from FK Poprad)
—	GK	SVK	Miroslav Mikla (on loan from FC Slovan Divín)
—	DF	SVK	Ivan Hladík (extended loan from FK Senica)
—	DF	MKD	Filip Gligorov (on loan from FK Podkonice)

Out: Note: Flags indicate national team as defined under FIFA eligibility rules; some limited exceptions apply. Players may hold more than one non-FIFA nationality.

No.	Pos.	Nation	Player
—	DF	SVK	Ivan Hladík (loan return to FK Senica)
—	MF	SVK	Július Chomistek (loan return to FK Dukla Banská Bystrica)
—	DF	BRA	Dionatan Teixeira (loan return to TJ Slovan Čeľadice)

== See also ==
- 2012–13 Corgoň Liga
- 2012–13 2. liga
