= Maros =

Maros may refer to:

- Maros, Indonesia, a town on Sulawesi
- Maros Regency, an administrative division on Sulawesi
- Maros karst, an area protected by the Bantimurung–Bulusaraung National Park
- Maros River, the Hungarian name of the Mureș, a tributary to the Tisza
- Maros County, the Hungarian name of the Mureș County, Romania
- Maros culture, a Bronze Age culture in southeastern Europe
- Maroš, a Slovak masculine name
- Maros-Vasarhely, a medieval name of the town of Târgu Mureș
- Basil Maros (1929–2002), Greek photographer and cinematographer
- Leo Maroš (born 1999), Austrian footballer
- Luka Maros (born 1994), Swiss handball player
- Magda Maros (born 1951), Hungarian fencer
- Miklós Maros (born 1943), Hungarian composer
- SMS Maros, a 19th-century Austro-Hungarian Navy river monitor
