= Higor =

Higor is a given name. It may refer to:

- Higor Pires (born 1980), Japanese futsal goalkeeper
- Higor Coimbra (born 1987), Brazilian football striker
- Higor Leite (born 1993), Brazilian football midfielder
- Higor Meritão (born 1994), Brazilian football defensive midfielder
- Higor Alves (born 1994), Brazilian long jumper
- Higor Vidal (born 1996), Brazilian football attacking midfielder
- Higor de Souza (born 1998), Brazilian futsal pivot

== See also ==
- Igor (given name)
