= Plánička =

Plánička is a Czech surname. Notable people with the surname include:

- František Plánička (1904–1996), Czech footballer
- František Plánička, birth name of Franz Planer (1894–1963), Czech-American cinematographer
- Jakub Plánička (born 1984), Czech footballer
