= Lubos Kolar =

Lubos Kolar may refer to:

- Luboš Kolář (1929–2012), Czech basketball player
- Ľuboš Kolár (born 1989), Slovak footballer
