= Ujčík =

Ujčík is a surname. Notable people with the surname include:

- Róbert Ujčík (born 1989), Slovak footballer
- Viktor Ujčík (born 1972), Czech ice hockey player
