= TJ Mladosť Kalša =

Slovak football club

- Full name: Telovýchovná jednota Mladosť Kalša
- Ground: Futbalový štadión TJ Mladosť Kalša, Kalša
- Capacity: 500
- Head coach: Ľubomír Maďarik
- League: 3. Liga
- 2018–19: 1st, 4. liga Juh (South) (promoted)
Home colours

TJ Mladosť Kalša is a Slovak football team, based in the village of Kalša.

== Current squad ==
Updated 11 July 2020 Note: Flags indicate national team as defined under FIFA eligibility rules; some limited exceptions apply. Players may hold more than one non-FIFA nationality.

No.	Pos.	Nation	Player
—	DF	SVK	Jaroslav Kolbas
—	FW	SVK	Róbert Zeher
—	FW	SVK	Ján Novák

No.	Pos.	Nation	Player

== Colours ==
Club colours are yellow and black.

== Notable players ==
Had international caps for their respective countries. Players whose name is listed in bold represented their countries while playing for Mladosť Kalša.

Past (and present) players who are the subjects of Wikipedia articles can be found here.

- (Slovakia) Ján Novák
- (Slovakia) Jaroslav Kolbas
