= Masarik =

Masarik, Masařík, Masárik, Masarík is a Slovak surname derived from the occupation of mäsiar / masař, or butcher. People with this surname may also be referred as Masaryk, Czech-language form, and vice versa. Notable people with the surname include:

- Ivan Masařík, Czech biathlete
- Juraj Masárik, Slovak footballer
