= Richard Kačala =

Slovak footballer (born 1991)

Personal information
- Full name: Richard Kačala
- Date of birth: 1 March 1991 (age 35)
- Place of birth: Prešov, Czechoslovakia
- Height: 1.78 m (5 ft 10 in)
- Position: Midfielder

Team information
- Current team: Gelnica

Youth career
- Tatran Prešov

Senior career*
Years	Team	Apps	(Gls)
2010–2012	Tatran Prešov juniori		
2011	→ Spišská Nová Ves (loan)		
2013	Tatran Prešov	17	(2)
2014	Sandecja Nowy Sącz	0	(0)
2014–2015	Tatran Prešov	25	(0)
2015	Lokomotíva Zvolen	15	(0)
2016–2018	Tatran Prešov	49	(0)
2019	Košice		
2019–	Gelnica		
2022–2023	→ Družstevník Župčany (loan)		

International career
- Slovakia U16
- Slovakia U18
- * Club domestic league appearances and goals as of 1 March 2024

Richard Kačala (born 1 March 1991) is a Slovak professional footballer who plays as a midfielder for Gelnica.

== Career ==
He made his official debut for Tatran Prešov on 9 March 2013, playing the last 5 minutes in a 0–0 home draw against Žilina, entering in as a substitute in place of Peter Lipták.
