= Maroš =

Maroš is a male given name which is a modern Slovak nickname derived from Marek and Marian. It is pronounced mah-row:sh. Notable people with the name include:

- Maroš Balko, Slovak footballer
- Maroš Ferenc, Slovak footballer
- Maroš Kramár, Slovak actor
- Maroš Klimpl, Slovak footballer
- Maroš Kondrót, Congressman of National Counsellar of Slovakia
- Maroš Kolpak, Slovak handball player
- Maroš Kováč, Slovak cyclist
- Maroš Molnár, Slovak track and field athlete
- Maroš Tkáč, Slovak water polo player
- Maroš Šefčovič, Slovak diplomat
- Maroš Žemba, Slovak ice hockey player
