= Jaroslav Prekop =

Slovak footballer

Personal information
- Date of birth: 8 August 1979 (age 47)
- Place of birth: Piešťany, Czechoslovakia
- Height: 1.81 m (5 ft 11 in)
- Position: Midfielder

Team information
- Current team: PFK Piešťany (manager)

Senior career*
Years	Team	Apps	(Gls)
2003–2006	SK Sigma Olomouc	6	(0)
2005–2006	→ FK AS Trenčín (loan)	32	(2)
2006–2010	Tatran Prešov	32	(3)
2010–2011	Gaz Metan Mediaș	1	(0)
2011	Dukla Banská Bystrica	21	(1)
2012	SC Marchtrenk	15	(2)

Managerial career
- 2025–: PFK Piešťany
- * Club domestic league appearances and goals

Jaroslav Prekop (born 8 August 1979) is a Slovak football manager and former player who is currently the manager of 4. Liga side, PFK Piešťany. As a player he played club football in the first-level leagues of Slovakia, the Czech Republic and Romania.

== Playing career ==
=== Early career ===
A midfielder, Prekop began playing football for the local club PFK Piešťany. In 2003 he transferred to Sigma Olomouc. He debuted in the Czech First League in a 1–0 win against Viktoria Plzeň, playing 11 minutes. His first start came in the next season, playing in a 1–0 defeat against FK Teplice, remaining on the pitch for 62 minutes. He went on to make only five appearances for Sigma altogether. In the next few years, Prekop played for FK AS Trenčín and Sigma Hranice.

=== Tatran Prešov and Gaz Metan Mediaș ===
In 2006, Prekop joined Tatran Prešov. He scored the winning goal in a 1–0 victory against title rivals FC Petržalka, scoring from a long range shot. He scored again in a 5–5 draw against MFK Kosice in the Eastern Slovak derby. In the 2nd round of the 2009–10 Corgoň League , Prekop collided with teammate David Čep in a match against FK Senica, tearing ligaments in his right knee and tearing the meniscus. It took him over eight months to recover. In 2010, Prekop left Tatran Prešov, signing a two-year contract with a one-year option with Romanian club Gaz Metan Mediaș as a free agent. He played as a substitute in the 2–2 league draw against FC Timișoara. He was one of eight Slovak players to play in the 2010–11 Liga I.

=== Dukla Banská Bystrica ===
In early 2011, Prekop signed for Dukla Banská Bystrica, having previously been playing for the club on trial a few months prior. He scored in a match against former side Prešov in August 2011, netting the only goal of the game from a shot which first struck the post in a 1–0 away win. Prekop left the club at the end of 2011, after not having been able to find a spot in the A-team.

== Managerial career ==
In 2024, Prekop became the assistant manager of his former club, PFK Piešťany. Following the sacking of Martin Krajčovič, he became the new head coach of Piešťany. His first match in charge would be a 2–1 away win against MFK Topvar Topoľčany in the Slovak Cup. His team faced previous league champions Slovan Bratislava in the 2025–26 Slovak Cup, where they lost 5–0 at home.
