= Jan Hošek =

Czech footballer (born 1989)

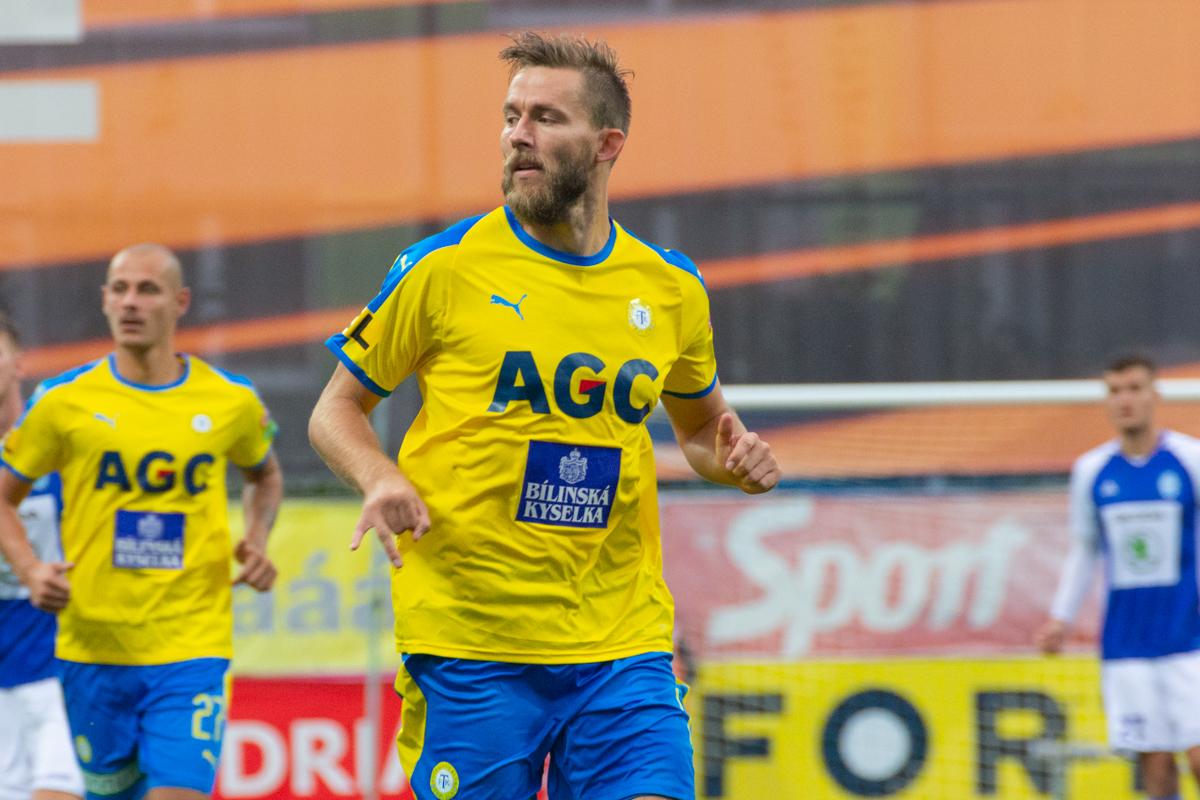

Personal information
- Date of birth: 1 April 1989 (age 37)
- Place of birth: Nýrsko, Czechoslovakia
- Height: 1.88 m (6 ft 2 in)
- Position: Left-back

Team information
- Current team: Bad Kötzting
- Number: 16

Youth career
- 1994–2002: Okula Nýrsko
- 2002–2005: Klatovy
- 2005–2008: Slavia Prague

Senior career*
| Years | Team | Apps | (Gls) |
| 2008–2010 | Slavia Prague | 11 | (0) |
| 2010–2021 | Teplice | 69 | (3) |
| 2011–2012 | → Cracovia (loan) | 14 | (0) |
| 2013 | → Baník Sokolov (loan) | 14 | (0) |
| 2016–2018 | → Karviná (loan) | 51 | (1) |
| 2019 | → Baník Sokolov (loan) | 15 | (1) |
| 2020 | → Opava (loan) | 6 | (0) |
| 2021 | Arka Gdynia | 1 | (0) |
| 2021– | Bad Kötzting | 46 | (0) |

International career
| 2009–2011 | Czech Republic U21 | 9 | (0) |
- * Club domestic league appearances and goals as of 13 December 2022

Jan Hošek (born 1 April 1989) is a Czech footballer who plays as a left-back for Bad Kötzting. His twin brother Petr Hošek was also a footballer.

== Career ==
=== Club ===
Hošek began his career 1994 with Okula Nýrsko after eight years with the club, signed than with TJ Klatovy in 2002. He played here three years and signed than in 2005 with SK Slavia Praha who played on youth side. In January 2009 was promoted to the first team Slavia Prague in the Gambrinus liga and played his first game on 23 February 2009 against FC Viktoria Plzeň.

In August 2011, he was loaned to Polish club Cracovia on a one-year deal.

=== International ===
He was member of the Czech under-21 team. He represented the team at the 2011 UEFA European Under-21 Football Championship.

== Honours ==
Slavia Prague

- Czech First League: 2008–09
