= Higor de Souza =

Brazilian futsal player

Personal information
- Full name: Higor Ribeiro de Souza
- Date of birth: 18 July 1998 (age 28)
- Place of birth: Brazil
- Height: 1.78 m (5 ft 10 in)
- Position: Pivot

Team information
- Current team: Corinthians
- Number: 17

Youth career
- Corinthians

Senior career*
| Years | Team | Apps | (Gls) |
| 2017–2020 | Corinthians | 21 | (5) |
| 2020–2022 | Palma Futsal | 45 | (26) |
| 2022–2026 | Benfica | 120 | (59) |
| 2022–2026 | Barcelona | 0 | (0) |

International career^{‡}
| 2018– | Brazil | 12 | (2) |
- * Club domestic league appearances and goals as of 00:00, 27 June 2019 (UTC) ‡ National team caps and goals as of 00:00, 27 June 2019 (UTC)

Higor Ribeiro de Souza (born 18 July 1998) is a Brazilian futsal player who plays as a pivot for Corinthians and the Brazilian national futsal team.

== Club ==
Corinthians

- Supercopa do Brazil de Futsal: 2019, 2020
- Copa do Brazil de Futsal: 2019
- Liga Paulista de Futsal: 2018, 2019
- Campeonato Paulista de Futsal: 2019

Benfica

- Campeonato Nacional: 2024–25, 2025–26
- Taça de Portugal: 2025–26
- Taça da Liga: 2025–26
- Supertaça: 2023

Brazil

- CONMEBOL Futsal Evolution League: 2017, 2018, 2025
