= Basil Maros =

Greek photographer and cinematographer (1929–2002)

Vasilis Maros
- Βασίλης Μάρος
- Born: 1929; Athens, Greece
- Died: 10 November 2002
- Occupations: Photographer; cinematographer; documentary filmmaker
- Years active: 1950–2002
- Known for: The Tragedy of the Aegean; The World of Images; Anastenaria; The Bouzouki

Vasilis Maros (Greek: Βασίλης Μάρος; 1929 – 10 November 2002) was a Greek photographer, cinematographer, and documentary film director with international collaborations, including work with 20th Century Fox, the BBC, and Italian and German television. He left a significant body of documentary films focused on Greek history, folklore, religious traditions, and the arts.

== Biography ==
Maros was born in Athens in 1929. He developed an early interest in photography; after WWII and imprisonment in a forced labor camp, he studied photography in Munich (1948–49) and served as a cameraman in the Hellenic Army Film Service (1950). Between 1952 and 1954 he undertook further training in Rome (INCOM) on a scholarship and began international work in film and television productions. From 1957 he focused on documentary filmmaking, exploring themes of Greek tradition, history, and art. In 1957 he worked as cinematographer for the Boy on a Dolphin

== Career and style ==
His work is noted for a human-centered perspective, documentary rigor, and the interplay of image and music, notably in films on rituals and popular culture such as Anastenaria and The Bouzouki. He maintained steady collaborations with international broadcasters such as the BBC, as well as Italian and German television, and participated in major international productions shot in Greece.

== International productions ==
Maros worked as a cameraman or director of photography on international productions filmed in Greece, through collaborations with major studios and broadcasters. He was awarded in the Thessaloniki International Film Festival in 1961.

== Awards and recognition ==
His films screened and received awards at Greek and international festivals, earning recognition for their aesthetic and documentary value.

== Legacy ==
He died on 10 November 2002. His work is honored in archival screenings and tributes by the public broadcaster, highlighting milestones of his career and his impact on Greek documentary cinema.

== Other sources ==
- Συλλογικό έργο, Βασίλης Μάρος, 50 χρόνια ελληνικού κινηματογράφου, Ταινιοθήκη της Ελλάδος, ΑΘήνα 2008.
