= Tibor Ravasz =

Slovak footballer

Personal information
- Full name: Tibor Ravasz
- Date of birth: 27 September 1990 (age 36)
- Place of birth: Czechoslovakia
- Position: Defender

Team information
- Current team: DAC Dunajská Streda
- Number: 26

Youth career
- DAC Dunajská Streda
- 2009–2010: Dunakanyar-Vác FC

Senior career*
Years	Team	Apps	(Gls)
2009–2010	Dunakanyar-Vác FC	1	(0)
2011–	DAC Dunajská Streda	1	(0)
- * Club domestic league appearances and goals as of 8 March 2012

Tibor Ravasz (born 27 September 1990) is a Slovak football defender of Hungarian ethnicity who currently plays for the Slovak Corgoň Liga club FK DAC 1904 Dunajská Streda.
