= Juraj Kuhajdík =

Slovak footballer (born 1984)

Personal information
- Full name: Juraj Kuhajdík
- Date of birth: 20 August 1984 (age 42)
- Place of birth: Czechoslovakia
- Position: Midfielder

Team information
- Current team: Kuala Lumpur FA

Youth career
- FC Slovan Solivar
- Spišská Nová Ves
- FC JOMA-Solivar Prešov
- 2002–2003: Prešov

Senior career*
Years	Team	Apps	(Gls)
2003–2004	Stará Ľubovňa		
2005–2006	Prešov		
2005–2006	→Vranov nad Topľou (loan)		
2006–2009	Stará Ľubovňa		
2008	→Bardejov (loan)		
2008–2012	Bardejov		
2009–2010	→Ružomberok (loan)	4	(0)
2011–2012	→TJ Slovan Dlhá Lúka (loan)		
2012	TSG Maselheim-Sulmingen		
2012–	Bardejov	0	(0)

International career
- Slovakia (futsal)
- * Club domestic league appearances and goals as of 21 July 2012

Juraj Kuhajdík (born 20 August 1984) is a Slovak football midfielder who plays Kuala Lumpur FA. He plays also Futsal for club PKP Košice.
