= Libor Žůrek =

Czech footballer

Personal information
- Date of birth: 2 November 1979 (age 46)
- Place of birth: Kojetín, Czechoslovakia
- Height: 1.81 m (5 ft 11 1/2 in)
- Position: Striker

Youth career
- 1986–1989: Slavoj Kojetín
- 1989–1994: PS Přerov
- 1994–1998: Baník Ostrava

Senior career*
Years	Team	Apps	(Gls)
1999–2007	Baník Ostrava	153	(22)
2007–2010	Tescoma Zlín	68	(10)
2011	Tatran Prešov	22	(3)
2012	Hanácká Slávia Kroměříž	8	(3)
2012–2013	ASV Spratzern	40	(33)
2014	USC Schweiggers	14	(7)
2014–2015	SC Sallingberg	23	(12)

International career
2000–2002	Czech Republic U21	13	(5)
Medal record
Men's football
Representing Czech Republic
UEFA European Under-21 Championship
Winner	2002 Switzerland
- * Club domestic league appearances and goals as of 26 October 2013

Libor Žůrek (born 2 November 1979 in Kojetín, Czechoslovakia) is a Czech retired footballer. He was a striker, with his biggest asset being his speed and great acceleration which makes him among the fastest players in the league.

Žůrek played for Czech youth national teams since the under-15 level, and in 2002 he was part of Czech under 21 side which won the UEFA U-21 Championships in Switzerland.

== Honours ==
With Baník Ostrava:

- Gambrinus liga: 2003/04
- Czech Cup: 2004/05

With Czech U-21s:

- UEFA European Under-21 Football Championship: 2002
