= Róbert Zeher =

Slovak footballer

Personal information
- Full name: Róbert Zeher
- Date of birth: 12 February 1985 (age 41)
- Place of birth: Košice, Czechoslovakia
- Height: 1.82 m (6 ft 0 in)
- Position: Forward

Team information
- Current team: Vyšné Opátske
- Number: 10

Youth career
- 1991–2003: Košice

Senior career*
Years	Team	Apps	(Gls)
2003–2004	Košice		
2004–2005	SFC Opava	41	(4)
2005–2013	Baník Ostrava	113	(18)
2006	→ Chmel Blšany (loan)	11	(0)
2006	→ 1. FC Slovácko (loan)	6	(1)
2007	→ FK Jablonec (loan)	10	(2)
2011–2012	→ Tatran Prešov (loan)	10	(0)
2013	→ Sulko Zábřeh (loan)		
2013–2015	Lokomotíva Košice		
2014	→ Topoľčany (loan)		
2014–2015	→ Veľký Horeš (loan)		
2015–2016	Košice – Krásna		(22)
2016–2020	Vyšné Opátske	?	(?)
2020-	Kalša	0	(0)
- * Club domestic league appearances and goals as of 3 August 2020

Róbert Zeher (born 12 February 1985) is a Slovak football striker who currently plays for Kalša. He also played in the Czech Gambrinus liga for club FC Baník Ostrava.
