= Juraj Kuráň =

Slovak footballer

Personal information
- Full name: Juraj Kuráň
- Date of birth: 11 August 1988 (age 38)
- Place of birth: Czechoslovakia
- Height: 1.71 m (5 ft 7 in)
- Position: Midfielder

Senior career*
Years	Team	Apps	(Gls)
2007–2008	Senec	20	(4)
2008–	Slovan Bratislava		
2010–2011	→ Petržalka (loan)	2	(0)
2011	→ ViOn Zlaté Moravce (loan)	6	(0)
2013	→ DAC Dunajská Streda (loan)	0	(0)
- * Club domestic league appearances and goals as of 9 January 2014

Juraj Kuráň (born 11 August 1988) is a Slovak footballer who plays as a midfielder.
