= Jakub Bartek =

Slovak football defender

Personal information
- Full name: Jakub Bartek
- Date of birth: 1 July 1992 (age 34)
- Place of birth: Prešov, Czechoslovakia
- Height: 1.81 m (5 ft 11 in)
- Position: Right back

Team information
- Current team: TJ ŠM Dulová Ves
- Number: 37

Youth career
- Tatran Prešov

Senior career*
Years	Team	Apps	(Gls)
2012–2018	Tatran Prešov	109	(4)
2019–2020	Partizán Bardejov	22	(1)
2020	→ TJ ŠM Dulová Ves (loan)		
2020–	TJ ŠM Dulová Ves		

International career
2010–2011	Slovakia U19	14	(0)
2012	Slovakia U21	3	(0)
- * Club domestic league appearances and goals as of 8 January 2020

Jakub Bartek (born 1 July 1992 in Prešov) is a Slovak football defender who currently plays for TJ ŠM Dulová Ves.

== 1. FC Tatran Prešov ==
He made his debut for Tatran Prešov against Slovan Bratislava on 14 July 2012.
