= Boubacar Diallo (footballer, born 1985) =

Guinean footballer (born 1985)

Personal information
- Date of birth: 25 December 1985 (age 40)
- Place of birth: Kindia, Guinea
- Height: 1.85 m (6 ft 1 in)
- Position: Centre-back

Senior career*
Years	Team	Apps	(Gls)
2006–2009	Gazélec Ajaccio	37	(2)
2009–2010	Sporting Toulon Var	20	(0)
2010–2011	Spartak Trnava	32	(1)
2012–2014	Al Ahed	25	(1)
Total		114	(4)

International career
2008–2011	Guinea	4	(0)
- * Club domestic league appearances and goals

Boubacar Diallo (born 25 December 1985) is a Guinean former professional footballer who played as a centre-back. Between 2008 and 2011, he made four appearances for the Guinea national team.

He joined Slovak Super Liga club Spartak Trnava in summer 2010.
