= Leo Maroš =

Austrian footballer (born 1999)

Leo Maros
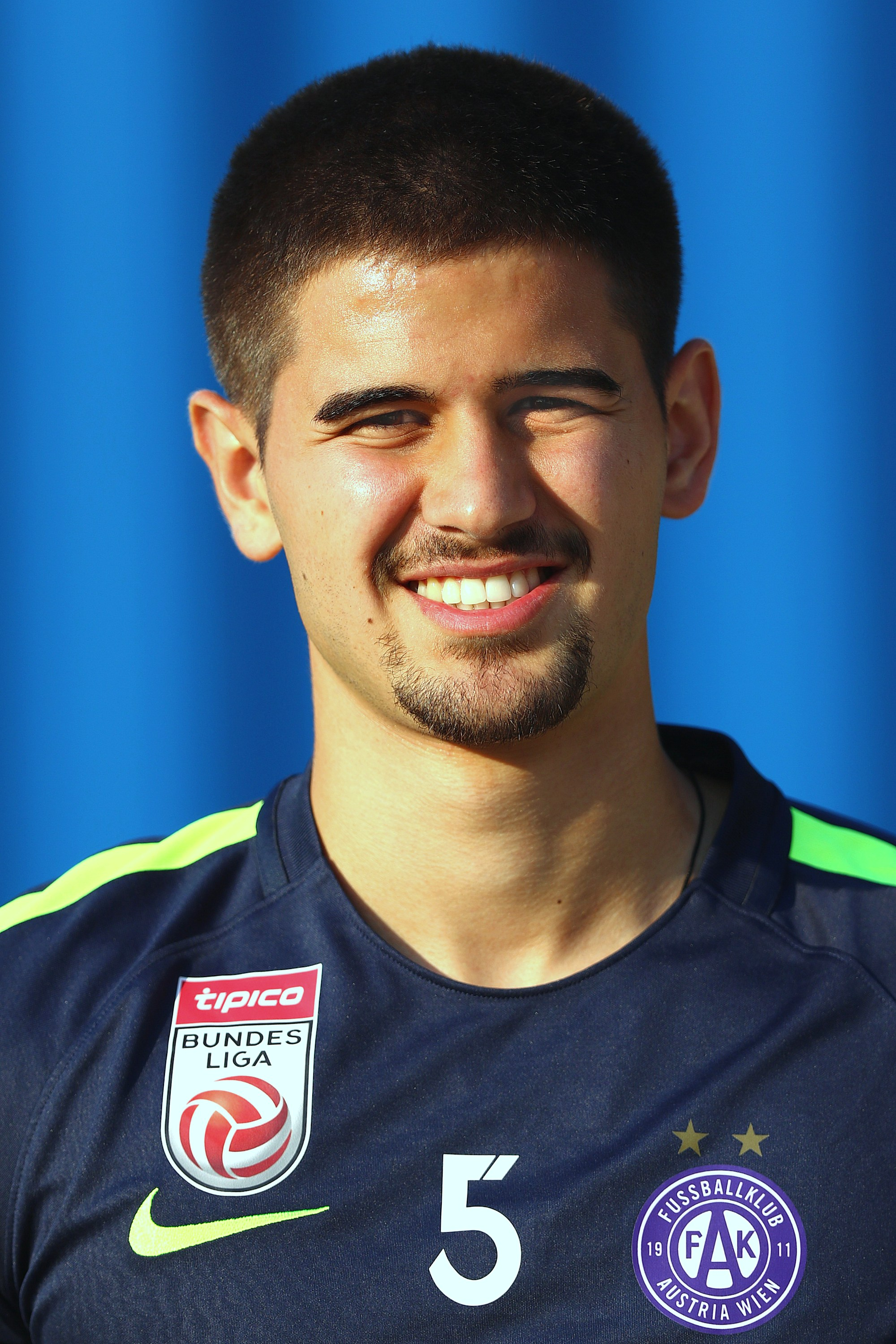

Personal information
- Full name: Leo Maros
- Date of birth: 16 June 1999 (age 27)
- Place of birth: Austria
- Height: 1.82 m (6 ft 0 in)
- Position: Centre-back

Team information
- Current team: ASK Ebreichsdorf
- Number: 16

Youth career
- 2006–2009: FavAC
- 2009–2012: Rapid Wien
- 2012–2015: TWL Elektra
- 2015–2018: Austria Wien

Senior career*
Years	Team	Apps	(Gls)
2017–2020	Austria Wien II	20	(1)
2020	→ Traiskirchen (loan)	2	(0)
2020–2023	Traiskirchen	53	(1)
2023–2024	TWL Elektra	26	(1)
2024–	ASK Ebreichsdorf	26	(1)
- * Club domestic league appearances and goals as of 18:31, 18 May 2025 (UTC)

Leo Maros (born 16 June 1999) is an Austrian footballer who plays as a centre-back for Austrian 2. Landesliga side ASK Ebreichsdorf.

== Career ==
=== Club career ===
Maroš began his career at the Favoritner AC. In 2009 he moved to the youth team at SK Rapid Vienna. In 2012 he moved to SC Team Wiener Linien (TWL Elektra) and in 2015 he joined the academy of FK Austria Vienna.

In March 2017, Maroš was in the squad of Austria Wien's reserve team for the first time, against SC Mannsdorf. He made his debut for the team in the Austrian Regionalliga in May 2017 when he was in the starting line-up against First Vienna FC on matchday 29 of the 2016/17 season.

Austria Wien II was promoted to the 2. Liga in 2018. In the promotion season 2017/18, Maroš made three appearances in the Regionalliga. Maroš signed his first professional contract with Austria Wien in May 2018. He made his professional debut in the 2. Liga in September 2018 when he came on as a substitute for Anouar El Moukhantir in the 78th minute against SK Austria Klagenfurt on matchday six of the 2018/19 season.

In January 2020 he moved to Austrian Regionalliga team FCM Traiskirchen on loan for the rest of the season. He continued at the club after the end of the loan spell. Ahead of the 2023–24 season, he moved to league rivals TWL Elektra.

In the summer 2024, Maroš joined Austrian 2. Landesliga side ASK Ebreichsdorf.
