= Juraj Tomášek =

Slovak footballer

Personal information
- Full name: Juraj Tomášek
- Date of birth: 6 July 1988 (age 38)
- Place of birth: Stretavka, Czechoslovakia
- Height: 1.77 m (5 ft 9 1/2 in)
- Position: Left winger

Team information
- Current team: Vráble

Youth career
- ŠKP Dúbravka
- 2005–2008: Slovan Bratislava

Senior career*
Years	Team	Apps	(Gls)
2008–	Zlaté Moravce	56	(2)
2011–2012	→ Senec (loan)	51	(7)
2013–	→ Vráble loan		

International career
- Slovakia U21
- * Club domestic league appearances and goals as of 28 February 2013

Juraj Tomášek (born 6 July 1988) is a Slovak football midfielder who plays for FK Spartak Vráble, on loan from FC ViOn Zlaté Moravce.

== Career ==
The midfielder began his career with ŠKP Dúbravka and then joined the junior team of SK Slovan Bratislava in the summer of 2005. He played for Slovan Bratislava between March 2008 and joined than in the youth team of FC ViOn Zlaté Moravce. After eight months with the A-youth of Zlaté Moravce was promoted in January 2009 to the seniorside.
