= Kalša =

Village and municipality in Slovakia

Kalša Kalsa
- Municipality
- Flag

- Location of Kalša in the Košice Region Location of Kalša in Slovakia
- Coordinates: 48.62°N 21.53°E
- Country: Slovakia
- Region: Košice Region
- District: Košice-okolie District
- First mentioned: 1270

Area
  - Total: 4.62 km^{2} (1.78 sq mi)
- Elevation: 200 m (660 ft)

Population (2025)
  - Total: 761
- Time zone: UTC+1 (CET)
  - Summer (DST): UTC+2 (CEST)
- Postal code: 441 8
- Area code: +421 55
- Vehicle registration plate (until 2022): KS
- Website: www.kalsa.sk

Kalša (Hungarian: Kalsa) is a village and municipality in Košice-okolie District in the Košice Region of eastern Slovakia.

== History ==
The village of Kalša lies at the southeastern foot of the Slanské vrchy mountains in the Podslanská hills. The village developed in the territory belonging to the monastery of the Crusaders. The first written mention of the village dates from 1270. In the medieval age it belonged to local landowners, later it became the property of the city of Košice by deposit and sale. In the past, the population was involved in traditional agriculture, logging and carting. There was a sawmill and a quarry in the village.

== Geography ==
The municipality lies at an altitude of 200 metres (660 ft) and covers an area of 4.62 km^{2} (1.78 sq mi) (2025).

== Population ==
Population statistic (10 years)
Year	1995	2005	2015	2025
Count	692	703	720	761
Difference		+1.58%	+2.41%	+5.69%

Population statistic
Year	2024	2025
Count	747	761
Difference		+1.87%

It has a population of 761 people (31 December 2025).

=== Ethnicity ===
Census 2021 (1+ %)
Ethnicity	Number	Fraction
Slovak	703	97.09%
Not found out	18	2.48%
Total	724	

In year 2021 was 724 people by ethnicity 703 as Slovak, 18 as Not found out, 6 as Rusyn, 3 as Hungarian, 2 as Austrian, 1 as Czech, 1 as Ukrainian and 1 as Other.

Note on population: The difference values of population numbers in the table "Population statistic" and in the sections "Ethnicity" & "Religion" is caused by the use of various statistical methods.

=== Religion ===
Census 2021 (1+ %)
Religion	Number	Fraction
Roman Catholic Church	440	60.77%
Greek Catholic Church	188	25.97%
None	38	5.25%
Not found out	26	3.59%
Calvinist Church	22	3.04%
Total	724	

In year 2021 was 724 people by religion 440 from Roman Catholic Church, 188 from Greek Catholic Church, 38 from None, 26 from Not found out, 22 from Calvinist Church, 2 from Eastern Orthodox Church, 2 from Christian Congregations in Slovakia, 2 from Ad hoc movements, 1 from Jehovah's Witnesses, 1 from Other, 1 from Evangelical Church and 1 from Buddhism.

== Genealogical resources ==
The records for genealogical research are available at the state archive "Statny Archiv in Kosice, Slovakia"

- Roman Catholic church records (births/marriages/deaths): 1744-1919 (parish B)
- Greek Catholic church records (births/marriages/deaths): 1798-1895 (parish B)
- Reformated church records (births/marriages/deaths): 1771-1896 (parish B)

== See also ==
- List of municipalities and towns in Slovakia
