= Norbert Csölle =

Slovak footballer

Personal information
- Date of birth: 18 June 1992 (age 34)
- Place of birth: Czechoslovakia
- Position: Midfielder

Team information
- Current team: DAC Dunajská Streda
- Number: 23

Youth career
- DAC Dunajská Streda

Senior career*
Years	Team	Apps	(Gls)
2012–	DAC Dunajská Streda	7	(0)
- * Club domestic league appearances and goals as of 31 May 2012

Norbert Csölle (born 18 June 1992) is a Slovak football midfielder of Hungarian ethnicity who currently plays for the Slovak First Football League club FK DAC 1904 Dunajská Streda.
