= Jaroslav Kolbas =

Slovak footballer

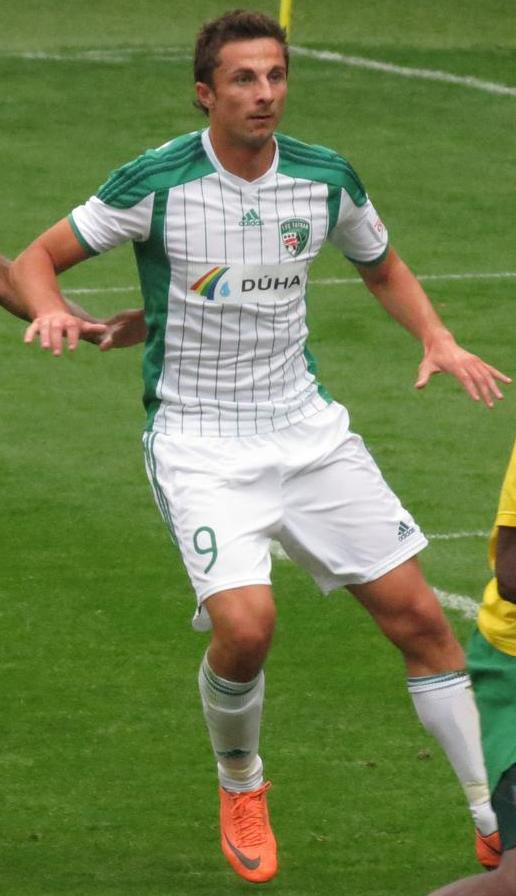

Personal information
- Date of birth: 10 January 1985 (age 41)
- Place of birth: Trebišov, Czechoslovakia
- Height: 1.81 m (5 ft 11 in)
- Positions: Defender; midfielder

Team information
- Current team: Mladosť Kalša

Youth career
- Slavoj Trebišov
- 1998–2002: Košice

Senior career*
Years	Team	Apps	(Gls)
2002–2003	Košice	1	(0)
2003–2005	Steel Trans Ličartovce		
2004	→ Košice (loan)		
2005–2011	Košice	156	(23)
2009	→ Skoda Xanthi (loan)	0	(0)
2011–2013	Tatran Prešov	55	(0)
2013–2014	Nitra	24	(0)
2014–2016	Haniska	29	(2)
2016	Družstevník Veľký Horeš	9	(2)
2017	VSS Košice	13	(3)
2017–2019	Slavoj Trebišov	59	(6)
2020–	Mladosť Kalša	0	(0)

International career
2008	Slovakia	2	(0)
- * Club domestic league appearances and goals as of 26 July 2020

Jaroslav Kolbas (born 10 January 1985) is a professional Slovak football defender who currently plays for the 3. Liga (East) club Mladosť Kalša.

== Club career ==
In December 2009, Kolbas terminated the one-year loan at Skoda Xanthi after half season and came back to Košice. In July 2011, he joined Slovak club 1. FC Tatran Prešov, signing two-year contract.

== International career ==
On 22 May 2008, Kolbas debuted for the Slovakia national football team in friendly match against Turkey at Bielefelder Alm.

== Career statistics ==
Club	Season	League		Domestic Cup		Europe		Total	
Club	Season	Pld	GF	Pld	GF	Pld	GF	Pld	GF
MFK Košice	2005–06	21	2	0	0	0	0	21	2
MFK Košice	2006–07	35	7	1	1	0	0	36	8
MFK Košice	2007–08	32	10	6	1	0	0	38	11
MFK Košice	2008–09	28	4	6	1	0	0	34	5
Xanthi	2009–10	0	0	0	0	0	0	0	0
MFK Košice	2009–10	14	0	0	0	0	0	14	0
MFK Košice	2010–11	26	0	1	0	0	0	27	0
Tatran Prešov	2011–12	24	0	2	1	0	0	26	1
Tatran Prešov	2012–13	19	0	2	0	0	0	21	0
Total		199	23	18	4	0	0	217	27

^{Last updated: 14 March 2013}
