= Ján Papaj =

Slovak footballer

Personal information
- Full name: Ján Papaj
- Date of birth: 16 June 1979 (age 47)
- Place of birth: Liptovský Mikuláš, Czechoslovakia
- Height: 1.70 m (5 ft 7 in)
- Positions: Right winger; right back

Team information
- Current team: Tatran Liptovský Mikuláš
- Number: 6

Youth career
- TJ Dovalovo

Senior career*
Years	Team	Apps	(Gls)
–1999	Liptovský Hrádok		
1999–2002	NCHZ Nováky		
2002–2003	Topvar Topoľčany		(4)
2003–2005	Prievidza		(3)
2004	→ Púchov (loan)	7	(0)
2005–2008	Senec	55	(3)
2008–2014	Tatran Prešov	177	(12)
2014–	Tatran Liptovský Mikuláš	130	(8)
- * Club domestic league appearances and goals as of 8 January 2020

Ján Papaj (born 16 June 1979) is a Slovak football player who plays for Tatran Liptovský Mikuláš, in the 2. liga.
