= Jozef Adámik =

Slovak footballer

Personal information
- Full name: Jozef Adámik
- Date of birth: 10 April 1985 (age 41)
- Place of birth: Komárno, Czechoslovakia
- Height: 1.90 m (6 ft 3 in)
- Position: Centre back

Team information
- Current team: Nové Zámky

Youth career
- Komárno
- 2001–2003: Slovan Bratislava

Senior career*
| Years | Team | Apps | (Gls) |
| 2003–2004 | Slovan Bratislava | | |
| 2005–2007 | Dubnica | 91 | (3) |
| 2008–2011 | Banská Bystrica | 61 | (5) |
| 2011–2012 | Baník Ostrava | 18 | (0) |
| 2012 | Tatran Prešov | 14 | (1) |
| 2013 | Banská Bystrica | 13 | (1) |
| 2013 | Spartak Trnava | 11 | (1) |
| 2014 | Komárno | 0 | (0) |
| 2014 | → Banská Bystrica (loan) | 8 | (0) |
| 2015 | SK Amateure Steyr | | |
| 2015–2016 | Komárno | | |
| 2016–2020 | ASK Kematen | | |
| 2020– | Nové Zámky | | |
- * Club domestic league appearances and goals as of 14 June 2015

Jozef Adámik (born 10 April 1985) is a Slovak football defender who plays for SK Vorwärts Steyr.

== Career ==
=== Club career ===
He came to Spartak Trnava in summer 2013.
