= Maroš Ferenc =

Slovak footballer

Personal information
- Full name: Maroš Ferenc
- Date of birth: 19 February 1981 (age 45)
- Place of birth: Prešov, Czechoslovakia
- Height: 1.84 m (6 ft 1/2 in)
- Position: Goalkeeper

Youth career
- Tatran Prešov

Senior career*
Years	Team	Apps	(Gls)
1998–2000	Tatran Prešov	46	(0)
2000–2001	Ozeta Trenčín	1	(0)
2001–2005	AS Trenčín	119	(0)
2005–2007	Tatran Prešov	46	(0)
2007–2008	MEAP Nisou	19	(0)
2008	Slavoj Trebišov	30	(0)
2008–2009	Zemplín Michalovce	10	(0)
2009–2010	Eindhoven	10	(0)
2011	MEAP Nisou		
2011–	Tatran Prešov	7	(0)
2013	→ Rozvoj Pušovce (loan)		
2014	→ Lokomotíva Košice (loan)		
2018	→ OFK - SIM Raslavice		

International career
- Slovakia U13
- Slovakia U19

Managerial career
- 2018–: Senica (goalkeeping coach)
- * Club domestic league appearances and goals as of 7 March 2020

Maroš Ferenc (born 19 February 1981, in Prešov) is a former Slovak football goalkeeper who currently acts as a goalkeeping coach in Michalovce.
