= Róbert Ujčík =

Slovak footballer

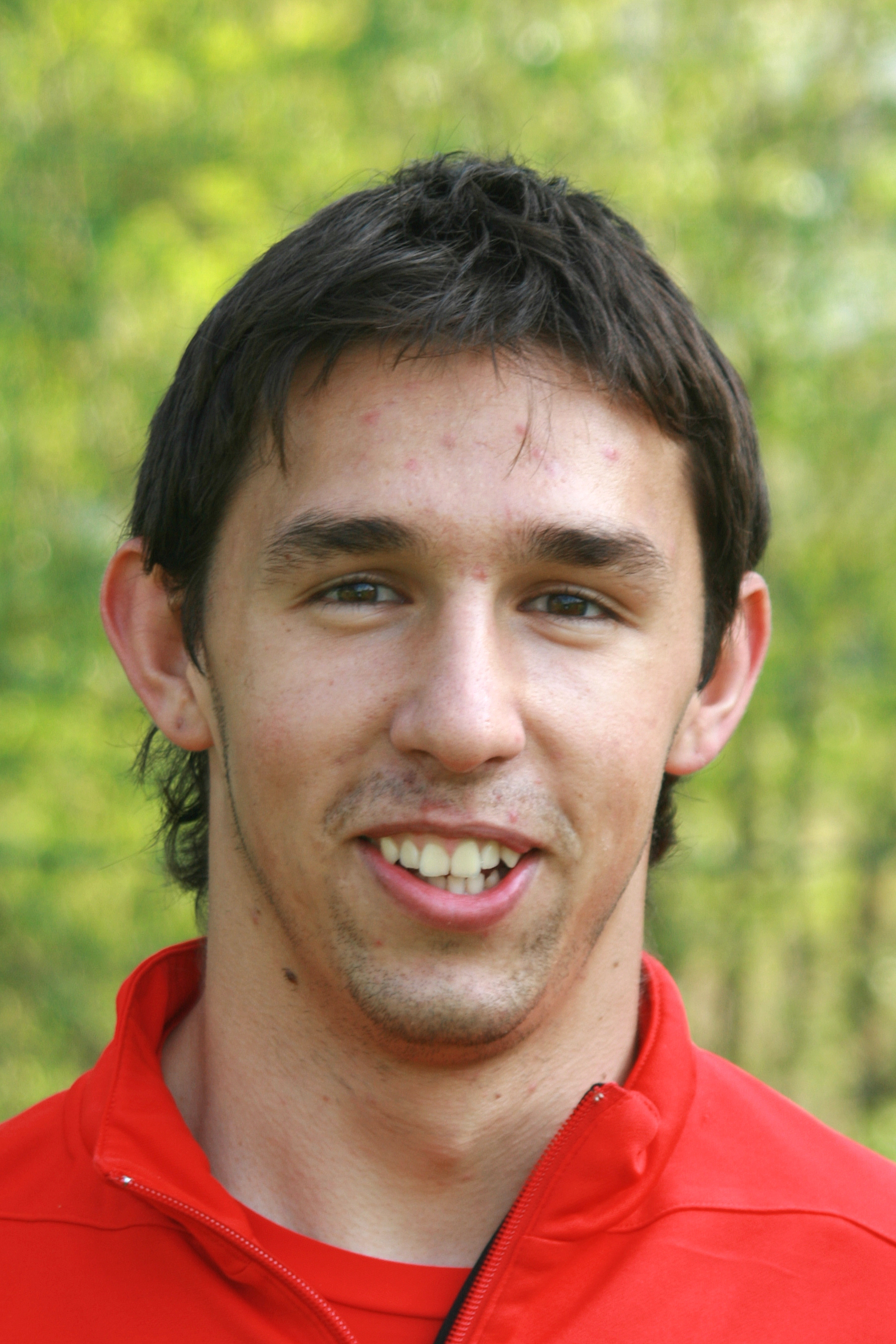

Personal information
- Full name: Róbert Ujčík
- Date of birth: 19 September 1989 (age 37)
- Place of birth: Poprad, Czechoslovakia
- Height: 1.88 m (6 ft 2 in)
- Position: Forward

Team information
- Current team: FK Poprad/ FK Poprad II
- Number: 11

Youth career
- 1. OFC Poprad
- AS Trenčín
- 2006–2008: Derby County

Senior career*
Years	Team	Apps	(Gls)
2009	Mattersburg II	12	(2)
2009	Slovan Bratislava	0	(0)
2010	Vítkovice	8	(0)
2010	Digenis Morphou		
2011–2015	Košice	6	(0)
2011–2012	Dolný Kubín	51	(19)
2013	SFM Senec	33	(7)
2014–2015	Poprad	49	(14)

International career
2007	Slovakia U19	3	(3)
- * Club domestic league appearances and goals as of 26 January 2016

Róbert Ujčík (born 19 September 1989) is a Slovak football striker who currently plays for FK Poprad/ FK Poprad II. He came from Košice.
