= Miroslav Poliaček =

Slovak footballer

Personal information
- Full name: Miroslav Poliaček
- Date of birth: 13 July 1983 (age 43)
- Place of birth: Bojnice, Czechoslovakia
- Height: 1.83 m (6 ft 0 in)
- Position: Midfielder

Team information
- Current team: Železiarne Podbrezová (general manager)

Senior career*
| Years | Team | Apps | (Gls) |
| 2002–2005 | Baník Prievidza | | |
| 2002–2003 | Hradec Králové | 5 | (0) |
| 2005–2008 | Slovan Bratislava | | |
| 2008–2010 | Tatran Prešov | 32 | (4) |
| 2011 | Senica | 9 | (1) |
| 2011 | Slovácko | 7 | (0) |
| 2012 | Ružomberok | 11 | (1) |
| 2012–2014 | Tatran Prešov | 69 | (4) |
| 2015 | Limanovia Limanowa | 13 | (0) |
| 2015–2016 | Pohronie | 30 | (2) |
| 2016–2017 | Poprad | 12 | (1) |
| 2017–2022 | FK Široké | 61 | (18) |
| 2021–2022 | → Slovan Valaská (loan) | 3 | (2) |
- * Club domestic league appearances and goals

Miroslav Poliaček (born 13 July 1983) is a Slovak football executive and former professional player who played as a midfielder. He is currently the general manager of Železiarne Podbrezová.

Before that, he played for Pohronie and Polish side Limanovia Limanowa. His former clubs also include 1. FC Tatran Prešov and the Gambrinus liga club Slovácko.
