= Lukáš Hruška =

Slovak footballer

Personal information
- Full name: Lukáš Hruška
- Date of birth: 2 March 1992 (age 34)
- Place of birth: Prešov, Czechoslovakia
- Height: 1.79 m (5 ft 10 in)
- Position: Left midfielder

Youth career
- Tatran Prešov

Senior career*
Years	Team	Apps	(Gls)
–2011	Tatran Prešov juniori		
2012–2016	Tatran Prešov	80	(14)
2016–2018	Skalica	43	(6)
2018	→ Odeva Lipany (loan)	14	(4)
2018–2019	ŠTK Šamorín	13	(1)
2019–2020	Podhale Nowy Targ	31	(5)
2020	Poprad Muszyna		
- * Club domestic league appearances and goals

Lukáš Hruška (born 2 March 1992) is a Slovak former professional footballer who played as a midfielder.

== Career ==
Hruška made his official debut for Tatran Prešov on 16 May 2012, playing the last 13 minutes in a 0–2 away lost against Trenčín.

On 29 January 2019, Hruška joined Polish side Podhale Nowy Targ.
