= Anton Lysyuk =

Ukrainian footballer

Personal information
- Date of birth: 26 February 1987 (age 39)
- Place of birth: Berdychiv, Ukrainian SSR, Soviet Union
- Height: 1.70 m (5 ft 7 in)
- Position: Midfielder

Youth career
- FC Berdychiv

Senior career*
| Years | Team | Apps | (Gls) |
- FC Berdychiv
- Nistru Otaci
- Rubin Kazan
| 2008–2009 | Oleksandria | 37 | (2) |
| 2009 | → Arsenal Bila Tserkva (loan) | 8 | (1) |
| 2010–2011 | Qizilqum Zarafshon | 20 | (1) |
| 2012 | Tatran Prešov | 11 | (0) |
| 2013 | Zirka Kropyvnytskyi | 4 | (0) |
- * Club domestic league appearances and goals

Anton Lysyuk (Ukrainian: Антон Лисюк; born 26 February 1987) is a Ukrainian former professional footballer who played as a midfielder.

== Career ==
Lysyuk joined Tatran Prešov on free transfer in winter 2012, signing a half-year deal.
