= David Čep =

Czech footballer (born 1980)

Personal information
- Full name: David Čep
- Date of birth: 4 October 1980 (age 46)
- Place of birth: Šternberk, Czechoslovakia
- Height: 1.85 m (6 ft 1 in)
- Position: Centre back

Team information
- Current team: 1. HFK Olomouc
- Number: 13

Youth career
- 1986–1990: Sokol Nový Svět
- 1990–1999: Sigma Olomouc

Senior career*
Years	Team	Apps	(Gls)
2000–2003	Sigma Olomouc	3	(0)
2002	→Bohemians 1905 (loan)	6	(0)
2003–2004	Vysočina Jihlava		
2004–2005	Sigma Olomouc	0	(0)
2005–2007	Hanácká Slávia Kroměříž		
2007–2011	Tatran Prešov	54*	(4*)
2012–2013	Olomouc	23	(0)
- * Club domestic league appearances and goals as of 5 May 2013

David Čep (born 4 October 1980 in Šternberk) is a Czech football defender who played in the Czech Gambrinus liga for two teams, as well as the Corgoň liga for Tatran Prešov. He currently plays for 1. HFK Olomouc.
