= Dávid Guba =

Slovak footballer (born 1991)

Personal information
- Full name: Dávid Guba
- Date of birth: 29 June 1991 (age 35)
- Place of birth: Humenné, Czechoslovakia
- Height: 1.81 m (5 ft 11 in)
- Positions: Forward; winger

Team information
- Current team: ASK Wilhelmsburg

Youth career
- TJ Sokol Vydraň
- MŠK Spartak Medzilaborce
- 2001–2005: Humenné
- 2005–2009: Tatran Prešov

Senior career*
Years	Team	Apps	(Gls)
2009–2012	Tatran Prešov	58	(3)
2013–2015	Žilina	40	(3)
2014	→ AS Trenčín (loan)	12	(3)
2015–2016	AS Trenčín	44	(3)
2016–2018	Bruk-Bet Termalica Nieciecza	47	(3)
2018–2020	Karviná	50	(8)
2021	Senica	9	(1)
2021–2022	Košice	26	(5)
2022	Bánová	7	(3)
2023	Považská Bystrica	8	(0)
2023	TSU Hafnerbach	13	(7)
2024–	ASK Wilhelmsburg		

International career
- Slovakia U17
2009–2010	Slovakia U19		
2011	Slovakia U21	6	(1)
2017	Slovakia (unofficial)	2	(0)
- * Club domestic league appearances and goals as of 30 June 2024

Dávid Guba (born 29 June 1991) is a Slovak footballer who plays as a winger for Austrian club ASK Wilhelmsburg.

== Club career ==
Born in Humenné, Guba played as a youth for TJ Sokol Vydraň, MŠK Spartak Medzilaborce and 1. HFC Humenné, where he played until he joined 1. FC Tatran Prešov in 2005. Guba was promoted to the first team during the 2008–09 season. His debut came on November 7, 2009 in the Corgoň Liga match against FK Dukla Banská Bystrica, entering in as a substitute in place of Michal Piter-Bučko. On November 19, 2011 he scored his first goal for 1. FC Tatran Prešov, against MFK Ružomberok in a 1–1 draw. In winter 2013, he came to MŠK Žilina and he signed a half-year loan with option to buy from 1. FC Tatran Prešov.

== International career ==
Guba was first called up to the senior national team for two unofficial friendly fixtures held in Abu Dhabi, UAE, in January 2017, against Uganda and Sweden. He capped his debut against Uganda, being fielded in the 70th minute, after substituting Tomáš Malec. Slovakia went on to lose the game 1–3. Guba also played the first 60 minutes of the match against Sweden, before being substituted by Filip Oršula. Slovakia lost the game 0–6.

== Honours ==
AS Trenčín

- Slovak First Football League: 2014–15, 2015–16
- Slovak Cup: 2014–15, 2015–16
