= Michal Krajník =

Slovak footballer

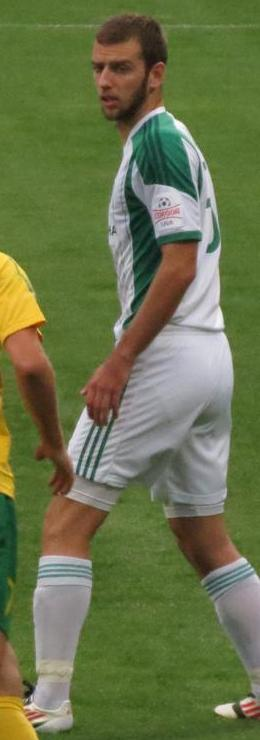

Personal information
- Date of birth: 5 April 1988 (age 38)
- Place of birth: Snina, Czechoslovakia
- Height: 1.84 m (6 ft 0 in)
- Positions: Centre back; defensive midfielder

Youth career
- 2001–2005: Snina
- 2005–2008: Prešov

Senior career*
Years	Team	Apps	(Gls)
2008–2015	Prešov	88	(5)
2009–2010	→ Šaľa (loan)		

International career^{‡}
- Slovakia U-18
- Slovakia U-19
- Slovakia U-20
- * Club domestic league appearances and goals as of 25 May 2015 ‡ National team caps and goals as of 28 August 2010

Michal Krajník (born 5 April 1988 in Snina), is a former Slovak football player who recently played for 1. FC Tatran Prešov.
