= Higor Coimbra =

Brazilian footballer (born 1987)

Personal information
- Full name: Higor de Sales Coimbra
- Date of birth: 7 August 1987 (age 39)
- Place of birth: Brasília, Brazil
- Height: 1.91 m (6 ft 3 in)
- Position: Striker

Senior career*
Years	Team	Apps	(Gls)
2004–2006	Gama		
2006–2008	Brasiliense	0	(0)
2006	→ Bandeirante (loan)	0	(0)
2007	→ Jataiense (loan)	0	(0)
2007	→ Samambaia (loan)	0	(0)
2008	→ Unaí (loan)	0	(0)
2009	Rio Preto	0	(0)
2009–2010	Hlavice	15	(12)
2010	Ružomberok	13	(3)
2010–2011	Spartak Trnava	19	(1)
2011	Tatran Prešov	6	(0)
- * Club domestic league appearances and goals as of 19 November 2011

Higor de Sales Coimbra (born 7 August 1987) is a former Brazilian footballer.

== Biography ==
Born in Brasília, Higor spent his early career in Federal District clubs. After he was released by Brasiliense in mid-2008, he joined São Paulo state club Rio Preto. He did not score any goal in the state league second division. He only able to play the first 5 games in the league as a defender. In July 2009 he left for Czech club SK Hlavice. He crossed the border to Slovakia in January 2010.

He came to FC Spartak Trnava in summer 2010. In 2011, he joined Sigma Olomouc. In September, he left for Tatran Prešov.
