= Juraj Masárik =

Slovak footballer

Personal information
- Full name: Juraj Masárik
- Date of birth: 1 March 1990 (age 36)
- Place of birth: Piešťany, Czechoslovakia
- Height: 1.80 m (5 ft 11 in)
- Position: Defender

Team information
- Current team: TJ Iskra Borčice
- Number: 5

Youth career
- TJ Družstevník Chtelnica
- Dubnica

Senior career*
Years	Team	Apps	(Gls)
2009–2012	Dubnica	33	(0)
2013–	Borčice		
- * Club domestic league appearances and goals as of 11 June 2015

Juraj Masárik (1 March 1990 in Piešťany) is a Slovak footballer who plays as a defender for the DOXXbet liga club TJ Iskra Borčice.
