= Miloš Brezinský =

Slovak footballer

Personal information
- Full name: Miloš Brezinský
- Date of birth: 2 April 1984 (age 42)
- Place of birth: Trenčín, Czechoslovakia
- Height: 1.91 m (6 ft 3 in)
- Position: Centre back

Senior career*
Years	Team	Apps	(Gls)
2002–2008	Slovan Liberec	12	(2)
2004	→ Kladno (loan)	6	(0)
2005	→ Rimavská Sobota (loan)	7	(0)
2005–2006	→ Mladá Boleslav (loan)	27	(1)
2007–2008	→ Sparta Prague (loan)	11	(0)
2008–2010	Politehnica Timişoara	22	(1)
2010–2012	Viktoria Plzeň	16	(0)
2011–2012	→ Dynamo České Budějovice (loan)	14	(0)
2012	Akzhayik	9	(1)
2013	Tatran Prešov	8	(0)
2013–2014	Sereď		
2014–2015	Rimavská Sobota	10	(0)
2015	ASK Kottingbrunn	8	(0)
2015–2016	TSU Hafnerbach	20	(10)
2016–2017	FK Hainburg		
2017–2019	TSU Hafnerbach		
Total		170	(15)

International career^{‡}
2002–2003	Slovakia U20	4	(0)
2004–2006	Slovakia U21	9	(0)
2007–2008	Slovakia	3	(0)
- * Club domestic league appearances and goals as of 16 July 2013 ‡ National team caps and goals as of 25 November 2009

Miloš Brezinský (born 2 April 1984 in Trenčín) is a Slovak former football defender.

== Poli Timișoara ==
He signed with FC Timişoara in the summer of 2008. On 23 July 2010, he was released from his contract.

== Honours ==
=== Club ===
Sparta Prague

- Czech Cup: 2007–08

Viktoria Plzeň

- Czech League: 2010–11
- Czech Supercup: 2011

=== International ===
Slovakia U20

- 2003 FIFA U-20 World Cup: Participation

Slovakia U19

- 2002 UEFA European Under-19 Football Championship – Third place
