= Petr Hošek (footballer) =

Czech footballer

Personal information
- Date of birth: 1 April 1989 (age 37)
- Place of birth: Nýrsko, Czechoslovakia
- Height: 1.91 m (6 ft 3 in)
- Position: Striker

Youth career
- SKP Okula Nýrsko
- Slavia Prague

Senior career*
Years	Team	Apps	(Gls)
–2010	Slavia Prague B		
2009–2010	→ Hlučín (loan)	21	(6)
2011–2013	Senica	35	(6)
2012–2013	→ DAC Dunajská Streda (loan)	35	(6)
2014	Flota Świnoujście	13	(3)
2014–2015	Jiskra Domažlice		
2015	Ústí nad Labem	12	(0)
2016	Frýdek-Místek	11	(3)
2016–2017	Fotbal Třinec	33	(2)
2018	Tatran Prešov	26	(5)
2019–2020	SC Wieselburg	11	(11)
2020–2021	SC Marchtrenk	3	(1)
2021–2022	SG Karlstein/Thaya	8	(3)
- * Club domestic league appearances and goals

Petr Hošek (born 1 April 1989) is a Czech former professional football forward who played as a striker. His twin brother Jan Hošek is also a footballer.

== Career ==
In January 2011, he signed a three-year contract for Senica.

In the summer 2019, Hošek joined Austrian club SC Wieselburg.
