= Rafael Torres (footballer) =

Brazilian footballer

Personal information
- Full name: Rafael Ricardo De Oliveira Torres
- Date of birth: 26 October 1989 (age 37)
- Place of birth: Campo Grande, Brazil
- Height: 1.78 m (5 ft 10 in)
- Position: Midfielder

Youth career
- Arapongas EC

Senior career*
Years	Team	Apps	(Gls)
- Internacional
- Roma Apucarana
?–2011	Arapongas EC	5	(0)
2011–2012	Tatran Prešov	15	(0)
2012	→ Zemplín Michalovce (loan)	6	(2)
- * Club domestic league appearances and goals

Ricardo Rafael De Oliveira Torres, or simply Rafael Torres (born 26 October 1989) is a Brazilian former professional footballer who played as a midfielder. His last clubs were Tatran Prešov and Zemplín Michalovce.

== Career ==
Rafael Torres was born in Campo Grande.

In August 2011, he joined Slovak club Tatran Prešov. He made his debut for Prešov against ViOn Zlaté Moravce on 12 August 2011. On 14 September 2012, he moved to Zemplín Michalovce on half-year loan from Tatran.
