= Ľuboš Kolár =

Slovak footballer

Personal information
- Full name: Ľuboš Kolár
- Date of birth: 1 September 1989 (age 37)
- Place of birth: Nitra, Czechoslovakia
- Height: 1.79 m (5 ft 10 in)
- Position: Winger

Youth career
- Nitra

Senior career*
Years	Team	Apps	(Gls)
2007–2012	Nitra	116	(13)
2013–2015	Slovan Liberec	24	(2)
2015–2017	Spartak Myjava	62	(8)
2017–2019	Podbeskidzie	4	(0)
2019	SV 7023 ZSP	8	(4)
- * Club domestic league appearances and goals

Ľuboš Kolár (born 1 September 1989) is a Slovak former professional footballer who played as a midfielder.

== Club career ==
In February 2019, Kolár joined Austrian club SV 7023 ZSP. He retired at the end of the season.
