= Peter Lipták =

Semi-retired Slovak footballer

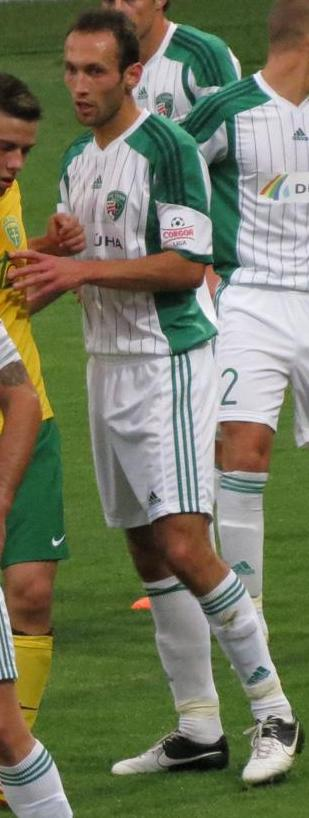

Personal information
- Date of birth: 7 September 1989 (age 37)
- Place of birth: Prešov, Czechoslovakia
- Height: 1.87 m (6 ft 2 in)
- Position: Defensive midfielder

Team information
- Current team: TJ Sokol Hrabkov

Youth career
- –2005: TJ Sokol Hrabkov
- 2005–2008: Tatran Prešov

Senior career*
Years	Team	Apps	(Gls)
2009	→ Vranov nad Topľou (loan)		
2009–2015	Prešov	98	(3)
2014	→ Dukla Banská Bystrica (loan)	11	(0)
2016	Slovan Duslo Šaľa	11	(0)
2016–2018	Skalica	41	(1)
2018–2019	Partizán Bardejov	21	(1)
2019	Železiarne Podbrezová	3	(0)
2019	TJ Sokol Hrabkov	6	(3)
- * Club domestic league appearances and goals as of 29 October 2020

Peter Lipták (born 7 September 1989) is a semi-retired Slovak football player who currently plays for amateur side TJ Sokol Hrabkov.

== Early life ==
He was born in Prešov. Lipták started out playing for hometown team TJ Sokol Hrabkov. He joined Tatran's youth academy at the age of sixteen.

== 1. FC Tatran Prešov ==
Lipták made his Tatran Prešov first-team debut on 3 April 2010 in a match against DAC Dunajská Streda. His style of play is characterised by clean tackling and hard work.
