= Michal Piter-Bučko =

Slovak footballer

Personal information
- Full name: Michal Piter-Bučko
- Date of birth: 28 October 1985 (age 41)
- Place of birth: Prešov, Czechoslovakia
- Height: 1.88 m (6 ft 2 in)
- Position: Centre-back

Team information
- Current team: Tatran Liptovský Mikuláš
- Number: 28

Youth career
- Tatran Prešov

Senior career*
Years	Team	Apps	(Gls)
2007–2012	Tatran Prešov	95	(6)
2012–2013	Podbeskidzie	23	(0)
2013–2016	Olimpia Grudziądz	82	(7)
2016–2023	Sandecja Nowy Sącz	193	(28)
2023–2025	Stará Ľubovňa	21	(1)
2025–	Tatran Liptovský Mikuláš	23	(2)
- * Club domestic league appearances and goals as of 25 May 2026

Michal Piter-Bučko (born 28 October 1985) is a Slovak professional footballer who plays as a centre-back for Tatran Liptovský Mikuláš.

== Club career ==
Born in Prešov. A product of hometown 1. FC Tatran Prešov youth system. In July 2012, he joined Polish club Podbeskidzie Bielsko-Biała on a two-year contract.

== Honours ==
Sandecja Nowy Sącz

- I liga: 2016–17
