= Jakub Plánička =

Czech footballer (born 1984)

Personal information
- Date of birth: 25 December 1984 (age 41)
- Place of birth: Ostrava, Czechoslovakia
- Height: 1.93 m (6 ft 4 in)
- Position: Goalkeeper

Youth career
- 199–1999: Baník Ostrava
- 1999–2002: NH Ostrava
- 2002–2003: Synot

Senior career*
Years	Team	Apps	(Gls)
2003–2005	Opava	1	(0)
2004–2005	→ HFK Olomouc (loan)		
2005–2007	Fotbal Jakubčovice		
2007	EPO Frenštát		
2007–2009	Dukla Praha	2	(0)
2009–2010	Púchov		
2010–2013	Tatran Prešov	15	(0)
2013	→ Rača (loan)		
2017	Slovan Bratislava B	0	(0)
- * Club domestic league appearances and goals as of 26 October 2013

Jakub Plánička (born 25 December 1984 in Ostrava) is a Czech football player who last played for the reserve team of ŠK Slovan Bratislava.
