= Peter Katona =

Slovak footballer

Personal information
- Full name: Peter Katona
- Date of birth: 12 April 1988 (age 38)
- Place of birth: Prešov, Czechoslovakia
- Height: 1.68 m (5 ft 6 in)
- Position: Midfielder

Team information
- Current team: TJ ŠM Dulová Ves (player-coach)
- Number: 27

Youth career
- Tatran Prešov

Senior career*
Years	Team	Apps	(Gls)
2007–2018	Tatran Prešov	277	(39)
2013	→ Rimavská Sobota (loan)	13	(1)
2018–2020	Partizán Bardejov	23	(3)
2020	→ TJ ŠM Dulová Ves (loan)		
2020–	TJ ŠM Dulová Ves		

International career
2006	Slovakia U19	3	(0)
2009–2010	Slovakia U21	4	(0)

Managerial career
- ????: TJ ŠM Dulová Ves
- * Club domestic league appearances and goals

Peter Katona (born 12 April 1988 in Prešov) is a Slovak football midfielder who currently plays for TJ ŠM Dulová Ves.
