= Marián Adam =

Slovak footballer

Personal information
- Full name: Marián Adam
- Date of birth: 20 September 1981 (age 45)
- Place of birth: Ilava, Czechoslovakia
- Height: 1.82 m (5 ft 11 1/2 in)
- Positions: Midfielder; striker

Youth career
- Tatran Prešov

Senior career*
Years	Team	Apps	(Gls)
1999–2002	Tatran Prešov	51	(9)
2002	Metalist Kharkiv	8	(0)
2002–2003	Tatran Prešov	?	(5)
2003–2004	Steel Trans Ličartovce	?	(12)
2004–2006	Dubnica	45	(5)
2007	Dunajská Streda		
2007–2008	Goral Stará Ľubovňa		
2008	Třinec	3	(1)
2008–2009	Zemplín Michalovce	15	(3)
2009–2010	SV Haitzendorf	15	(10)
2010–2012	Tatran Prešov	34	(1)
2013	→ Rimavská Sobota (loan)	2	(1)
2013	SC Marchtrenk	7	(1)
2014–2015	Tatran Prešov	0	(0)
2014	Pohronie	23	(8)
2015	Sereď	14	(0)
2016–2019	ASKÖ Raiffeisen Gosau		

International career^{‡}
- Slovakia U17
- Slovakia U18
- Slovakia U19
- Slovakia U21
- * Club domestic league appearances and goals as of 15 August 2020 ‡ National team caps and goals as of 2 May 2012

Marián Adam (born 20 September 1981 in Ilava) is a Slovak football player who currently plays for ASKÖ Raiffeisen Gosau.
