= 2013–14 Spartak Myjava season =

Spartak Myjava
2013–14 season
- President: Pavel Halabrín
- Manager: Ladislav Hudec (until 19 December 2013); Radúz Dorňák (from 23 December 2013)
- Stadium: Stadium Myjava
- Slovak First Football League: 7th
- Slovak Cup: Second round
- Top goalscorer: League: Štefan Pekár (11); All: Štefan Pekár (11)
- Highest home attendance: 2,700 (multiple Slovak First Football League matches)
- Lowest home attendance: 1,137 v ViOn Zlaté Moravce (1 April 2014, Slovak First Football League)
- Average home league attendance: 2,050
- Biggest win: 6–2 v Spartak Trnava (Home, 27 July 2013, Slovak First Football League); 4–0 v Nitra (Home, 5 October 2013, Slovak First Football League)
- Biggest defeat: 0–5 v Slovan Bratislava (Away, 4 August 2013, Slovak First Football League); 0–5 v Ružomberok (Away, 17 May 2014, Slovak First Football League)

The 2013–14 season was Spartak Myjava's 2nd consecutive season in Slovak First Football League. In addition to the domestic league, the club participated in this season's editions of Slovak Cup.

== Squad ==
Note: Flags indicate national team as defined under FIFA eligibility rules; some limited exceptions apply. Players may hold more than one non-FIFA nationality.

No.	Pos.	Nation	Player
1	GK	SVK	Peter Solnička
2	MF	SVK	Marek Jastráb
3	DF	SVK	Marcel Onder
4	MF	SVK	Ondrej Neoveský
5	DF	SVK	Martin Vavak
6	DF	SVK	Peter Kumančík
7	FW	SVK	Pavol Kosík
8	DF	SVK	Lukáš Beňo
9	FW	SVK	Štefan Pekár
10	DF	SVK	Martin Černáček (captain)
11	FW	SVK	Filip Oršula

No.	Pos.	Nation	Player
14	MF	SVK	Peter Šulek
15	DF	SVK	Roman Častulín
16	FW	SVK	Ľubomír Urgela
19	DF	SVK	Miroslav Duga
20	MF	SVK	Tomáš Marček
21	MF	SVK	Tomáš Bruško
23	MF	CZE	Erik Daniel (on loan from Slovan Liberec)
24	DF	SVK	Matej Siva
25	GK	SVK	Matej Székely
28	GK	SVK	Tomáš Belic
30	GK	SVK	Erik Jurica

== Transfers ==
=== Summer ===
In: Note: Flags indicate national team as defined under FIFA eligibility rules; some limited exceptions apply. Players may hold more than one non-FIFA nationality.

No.	Pos.	Nation	Player
—	MF	SVK	Ondrej Neoveský (loan return from ŠK SFM Senec)
—	DF	SVK	Marcel Onder (loan return from OTJ Moravany nad Váhom)
—	MF	SVK	Štefan Pekár (from MFK Ružomberok)
—	MF	SVK	Peter Šulek (from MŠK Žilina)
—	DF	SVK	Filip Lukšík (from (Netherlands) ADO Den Haag)

Out: Note: Flags indicate national team as defined under FIFA eligibility rules; some limited exceptions apply. Players may hold more than one non-FIFA nationality.

No.	Pos.	Nation	Player
9	FW	SVK	Zoltán Harsányi (loan return to (Hungary) Pécsi MFC)
18	MF	SVK	Peter Ďuriš (Released)
22	DF	SVK	Tomáš Mrva (Released)
—	MF	SVK	Peter Šulek (loan return to MŠK Žilina)

=== Winter ===
In: Note: Flags indicate national team as defined under FIFA eligibility rules; some limited exceptions apply. Players may hold more than one non-FIFA nationality.

No.	Pos.	Nation	Player
—	GK	SVK	Tomáš Belic (from FK DAC 1904 Dunajská Streda)
—	DF	SVK	Lukáš Beňo (from FK DAC 1904 Dunajská Streda)
—	MF	SVK	Frederik Bílovský (from MFK Dubnica)
—	FW	SVK	Roland Šmahajčík (from MFK Dubnica)
—	MF	SVK	Denis Duga (on loan from (Czech Republic) SK Slavia Prague)
—	MF	SVK	Matej Kováč (loan return from MFK Vrbové)
—	FW	SVK	Filip Oršula (from (Germany) MSV Duisburg)
—	GK	SVK	Tomáš Sládeček (from (Czech Republic) TJ Kordárna Velká nad Veličkou)
—	FW	SVK	Matúš Jorík (from MFK Vrbové)
—	GK	SVK	Roman Černák (from FK Turani)

Out: Note: Flags indicate national team as defined under FIFA eligibility rules; some limited exceptions apply. Players may hold more than one non-FIFA nationality.

No.	Pos.	Nation	Player
—	GK	SVK	Matej Székely (loan return to FC Spartak Trnava)
—	DF	SVK	Miroslav Duga (Released)
—	DF	SVK	Filip Lukšík (Released)
—	MF	SVK	Peter Kuračka (loan return to FC Spartak Trnava)
—	MF	SVK	Lukáš Pelegríni (loan return to FC ŠTK 1914 Šamorín)
—	FW	SVK	Milan Ferenčík (to FK Senica)
—	MF	SVK	Vladimír Kukoľ (to (Czech Republic) FC Vysočina Jihlava)
—	GK	SVK	Erik Jurica (on loan to MFK Vrbové)
—	DF	SVK	Martin Vavák (on loan to MFK Stará Turá)
—	MF	SVK	Marek Jastráb (on loan to MFK Dubnica)
—	FW	SVK	Matúš Jorík (on loan to MFK Vrbové)

== Competitions ==
=== Overview ===
Competition	First match	Last match	Starting round	Final position	Record							
Competition	First match	Last match	Starting round	Final position	Pld	W	D	L	GF	GA	GD	Win %
Slovak First Football League	12 July 2013	31 May 2014	Matchday 1	7th	33	13	6	14	45	54	−9	39.39
Slovak Cup	28 August 2013	28 August 2013	Second round	Second round	1	0	0	1	0	1	−1	0.00
Total					34	13	6	15	45	55	−10	38.24

Source: Competitions

=== Slovak First Football League ===
==== League table ====
Pos	Team	Pld	W	D	L	GF	GA	GD	Pts	Qualification or relegation
5	Košice	33	13	7	13	41	40	+1	46	Qualification for Europa League second qualifying round (Note: 2013–14 Slovak Cup winners Košice qualified for the second qualifying round of the 2014–15 UEFA Europa League.)
6	Senica	33	13	7	13	45	47	−2	46	
7	Myjava	33	13	6	14	45	54	−9	45	
8	Dukla Banská Bystrica	33	11	9	13	48	48	0	42	
9	Žilina	33	11	7	15	49	50	−1	40	

Source: Niké liga (in Slovak)
Rules for classification: 1) points; 2) goal difference; 3) number of goals scored.

==== Results summary ====
Overall								Home						Away					
Pld	W	D	L	GF	GA	GD	Pts	W	D	L	GF	GA	GD	W	D	L	GF	GA	GD
33	13	6	14	45	54	−9	45	6	6	5	28	26	+2	7	0	9	17	28	−11

Source: Corgoň Liga

==== Results by round ====
Round	1	2	3	4	5	6	7	8	9	10	11	12	13	14	15	16	17	18	19	20	21	22	23	24	25	26	27	28	29	30	31	32	33
Ground	H	A	H	A	H	A	H	H	A	H	A	A	H	A	H	A	H	A	A	H	H	H	H	A	H	A	H	A	H	H	A	A	A
Result	L	W	W	L	D	W	W	W	W	D	L	L	W	W	D	L	L	W	L	L	D	D	W	L	L	W	W	L	D	L	L	L	W
Position	12	9	7	8	8	4	3	3	2	2	2	4	2	2	4	4	4	4	5	5	5	6	5	6	7	6	5	5	5	6	7	7	7
Points	0	3	6	6	7	10	13	16	19	20	20	20	23	26	27	27	27	30	30	30	31	32	35	35	35	38	41	41	42	42	42	42	45

Source: Corgoň Liga
A = Away; H = Home; W = Win; D = Draw; L = Loss

==== Matches ====
12 July 2013 1	Spartak Myjava	0–4	Dukla Banská Bystrica	Myjava
20:00 CEST (UTC+2)	Kosík (yellow card) 47'	Report	Slančík 8', 57'; Podstavek (yellow card) 20'; Turňa (yellow card) 26'; Jurčo 40', 43'	Stadium: Stadium Myjava; Attendance: 2,112; Referee: Dušan Sedlák; Assistant referees: Dušan Kubačka, Peter Bednár

20 July 2013 2	Nitra	0–1	Spartak Myjava	Nitra
19:30 CEST (UTC+2)	Šimončič (yellow card) 25'; Hála (yellow card) 58'; Kolmokov (yellow card) 61'; Cléber (yellow card) 76'; Kaspřák (yellow card) 90'	Report	Kukoľ (yellow card) 5' (red card) 23'; Šulek 51'	Stadium: Štadión pod Zoborom; Attendance: 1,259; Referee: Peter Kráľovič; Assistant referees: Tomáš Vorel, Branislav Hancko

27 July 2013 3	Spartak Myjava	6–2	Spartak Trnava	Myjava
19:30 CEST (UTC+2)	Černáček 13'; Pekár 19'; Šulek 25', 60'; Sládek 41'; Častulín (yellow card) 54'; Lukšík (yellow card) 75'; Daniel 90'	Report	Hodek 9'; Štepanovský 26', (yellow card) 59'; Ma. Tóth (yellow card) 29'; Janečka (yellow card) 90'	Stadium: Stadium Myjava; Attendance: 2,700; Referee: Mário Vlk; Assistant referees: Roman Slyško, Henrich Mikulaj

4 August 2013 4	Slovan Bratislava	5–0	Spartak Myjava	Bratislava
19:30 CEST (UTC+2)	Mészáros 29'; Gorosito (yellow card) 39'; Soumah 45'; Fořt 50'; Bagayoko 54'; Peltier 90'	Report	Sládek (yellow card) 58'; Častulín (yellow card) 69'	Stadium: Pasienky; Attendance: 3,711; Referee: Ján Valášek; Assistant referees: Erik Weiss, Ondrej Brendza

10 August 2013 5	Spartak Myjava	2–2	Senica	Myjava
20:00 CEST (UTC+2)	Pekár 37'; Bruško (red card) 45'; Pellegrini (yellow card) 45'; Kosík (yellow card) 52'; Urgela 62'; Sládek (yellow card) 71'	Report	Kalabiška (yellow card) 35'; Diviš (yellow card) 39'; Pavlík 42'; Piroska (yellow card) 45', (goal) 47'	Stadium: Stadium Myjava; Attendance: 2,700; Referee: Kamil Horváth; Assistant referees: Milan Cuninka, Martin Borsányi

17 August 2013 6	Trenčín	2–3	Spartak Myjava	Trenčín
17:30 CEST (UTC+2)	Štefánik 5' (pen.), 66'; Mondek (yellow card) 43'; Ramón (yellow card) 63'	Report	Černáček (yellow card) 4'; Sládek 48', (yellow card) 84'; Pekár 71'; Ferenčík 79', (yellow card) 90'; Kukoľ (yellow card) 74'	Stadium: Štadión na Sihoti; Attendance: 3,315; Referee: Ján Valášek; Assistant referees: Erik Weiss, Peter Jenčura

23 August 2013 7	Spartak Myjava	4–1	DAC Dunajská Streda	Myjava
20:00 CEST (UTC+2)	Kosík (red card) 17'; Kukoľ 28'; Lukšík 53'; Siva 66'; Častulín 78'	Report	Sedlák (yellow card) 6'; Beňo (yellow card) 35'; Siva 72' (o.g.)	Stadium: Stadium Myjava; Attendance: 2,321; Referee: Pavol Šuniar; Assistant referees: Martin Balko, Karol Poláček

31 August 2013 8	Spartak Myjava	1–0	Košice	Myjava
20:00 CEST (UTC+2)	Marček (yellow card) 37' (red card) 49'; Kuračka 76'; Černáček (yellow card) 90'	Report	Duda (yellow card) 51'; Šinglár (yellow card) 59'; Bašista (red card) 90'	Stadium: Stadium Myjava; Attendance: 2,276; Referee: Miroslav Fajčík; Assistant referees: Dušan Kubačka, Juraj Lieskovský

14 September 2013 9	Ružomberok	0–3	Spartak Myjava	Ružomberok
17:30 CEST (UTC+2)		Report	Pellegrini 6', (yellow card) 51'; Kosík 54', 81'	Stadium: Štadión MFK Ružomberok; Attendance: 2,356; Referee: Pavol Šuniar; Assistant referees: Martin Vindiš, Dušan Petríček

17 September 2013 10	Spartak Myjava	1–1	Žilina	Myjava
18:30 CEST (UTC+2)	Pekár 2'; Kosík (yellow card) 80'	Report	Akakpo (yellow card) 37', (goal) 48'	Stadium: Stadium Myjava; Attendance: 2,058; Referee: Dušan Sedlák; Assistant referees: Peter Bóllo, Peter Jenčura

20 September 2013 11	ViOn Zlaté Moravce	1–0	Spartak Myjava	Zlaté Moravce
17:30 CEST (UTC+2)	Pribula 25'; Candrák (yellow card) 65'; Mazan (yellow card) 79'	Report	Siva (yellow card) 57'; Černáček (yellow card) 59'; Šulek (yellow card) 89'	Stadium: Štadión FC ViOn; Attendance: 1,146; Referee: Gabriel Michlian; Assistant referees: Martin Balko, Rastislav Žákech

28 September 2013 12	Dukla Banská Bystrica	1–0	Spartak Myjava	Banská Bystrica
15:30 CEST (UTC+2)	Vajda 74'; Ľupták (yellow card) 78'	Report	Šulek (yellow card) 82'	Stadium: Štadión SNP; Attendance: 2,230; Referee: Ján Valášek; Assistant referees: Tomáš Mókoš, Martin Vindiš

5 October 2013 13	Spartak Myjava	4–0	Nitra	Myjava
14:30 CEST (UTC+2)	Siva (yellow card) 18'; Kosík (yellow card) 50'; Pekár 60'; Ferenčík 64'; Častulín 83'; Dubeň 90' (o.g.)	Report	Bagi (yellow card) 53'; Kolbas (yellow card) 59'; Hála (yellow card) 90'	Stadium: Stadium Myjava; Attendance: 1,536; Referee: Vladimír Hracho; Assistant referees: Tomáš Vorel, Branislav Hrdlička

19 October 2013 14	Spartak Trnava	0–1	Spartak Myjava	Trnava
14:30 CEST (UTC+2)	Štepanovský (yellow card) 82'	Report	Marček (yellow card) 23'; Daniel 28'; Siva (yellow card) 70'; Ferenčík (yellow card) 90'	Stadium: Anton Malatinský Stadium; Attendance: 2,842; Referee: Pavol Chmura; Assistant referees: Dušan Petríček, Martin Borsányi

26 October 2013 15	Spartak Myjava	2–2	Slovan Bratislava	Myjava
18:00 CEST (UTC+2)	Urgela 6'; Šulek 12'; Marček (yellow card) 37'	Report	Milinković 28'; Mészáros (yellow card) 38'; Gorosito (yellow card) 60'; Hlohovský 87'	Stadium: Stadium Myjava; Attendance: 2,700; Referee: Patrik Hrčka; Assistant referees: Radomír Sluk, Miroslav Benko

2 November 2013 16	Senica	3–1	Spartak Myjava	Senica
14:00 CET (UTC+1)	Diviš 13', (yellow card) 78'; Siva 30' (o.g.); Piroska (yellow card) 33'; Pavlík 75'; Kalabiška (yellow card) 90'	Report	Kukoľ (yellow card) 40'; Siva (yellow card) 64'; Černáček 78'	Stadium: Štadión FK Senica; Attendance: 3,509; Referee: Michal Smolák; Assistant referees: Tomáš Somoláni, Mária Súkeníková

9 November 2013 17	Spartak Myjava	1–3	Trenčín	Myjava
16:00 CET (UTC+1)	Urgela 2'; Marček (yellow card) 87'	Report	Mišák 16'; Alves 21'; Van Kessel 50'; Baéz (yellow card) 65'	Stadium: Stadium Myjava; Attendance: 2,038; Referee: Ľubomír Samotný; Assistant referees: Milan Cuninka, Rastislav Žákech

23 November 2013 18	DAC Dunajská Streda	0–3	Spartak Myjava	Dunajská Streda
13:30 CET (UTC+1)	Majerník (yellow card) 42'; Boya (yellow card) 66'	Report	Černáček (yellow card) 17'; Pekár 21', 25', 68' (pen.)	Stadium: DAC Stadion; Attendance: 780; Referee: Pavol Šuniar; Assistant referees: Dušan Hrčka, Dušan Petríček

30 November 2013 19	Košice	2–1	Spartak Myjava	Košice
13:00 CET (UTC+1)	Novák 22'; Šinglár (yellow card) 34'; Kavka 55'; Hovančík (yellow card) 85'	Report	Lukšík (yellow card) 31'; Šulek (yellow card) 44'; Siva (yellow card) 68', (goal) 69'	Stadium: Štadión Lokomotívy v Čermeli; Attendance: 1,720; Referee: Anton Ihring; Assistant referees: Tomáš Mókoš, Dušan Kubačka

1 March 2014 20	Spartak Myjava	0–3	Ružomberok	Myjava
17:00 CET (UTC+1)		Report	Zošák 18'; Almaský 44'; Bartoš (yellow card) 49'; Zreľák 65'	Stadium: Stadium Myjava; Attendance: 1,730; Referee: Patrik Hrčka; Assistant referees: Tomáš Vorel, Peter Bednár

8 March 2014 21	Spartak Myjava	2–2	Žilina	Myjava
17:00 CET (UTC+1)	Solnička (yellow card) 56'; Pekár 62' (pen.), 81'; Černáček (yellow card) 66'	Report	Alves 12'; Káčer (yellow card) 39'; Jurčo (yellow card) 61'; Králik 71'	Stadium: Stadium Myjava; Attendance: 1,853; Referee: Jozef Pavlík; Assistant referees: Radomír Sluk, Henrich Mikulaj

22 March 2014 23	Spartak Myjava	2–1	Dukla Banská Bystrica	Myjava
17:00 CET (UTC+1)	Kosík 7'; Daniel (yellow card) 77'; Urgela 81', (yellow card) 82'	Report	Chrien 65'	Stadium: Stadium Myjava; Attendance: 1,353; Referee: Michal Smolák; Assistant referees: Martin Balko, Dušan Petríček

29 March 2014 24	Nitra	3–0	Spartak Myjava	Nitra
14:30 CET (UTC+1)	Mikuš 30' (pen.), 58'; Kutra (yellow card) 51'; Böhm (yellow card) 64'; Cléber (yellow card) 75', (goal) 86'	Report	Beňo (yellow card) 29'; Daniel (yellow card) 65'; D. Duga (yellow card) 83'; Pekár (yellow card) 89'	Stadium: Štadión pod Zoborom; Attendance: 1,150; Referee: Kamil Horváth; Assistant referees: Roman Slyško, Rastislav Žákech

1 April 2014 22	Spartak Myjava	0–0	ViOn Zlaté Moravce	Myjava
19:00 CEST (UTC+2)	Šulek (yellow card) 74'	Report		Stadium: Stadium Myjava; Attendance: 1,137; Referee: Martin Ježík; Assistant referees: Miroslav Benko, Ondrej Brendza

5 April 2014 25	Spartak Myjava	0–3	Spartak Trnava	Myjava
19:00 CEST (UTC+2)	Marček (yellow card) 51'; Kosík (yellow card) 69'; Častulín (yellow card) 73'	Report	Sabo 31'; Vyskočil (yellow card) 51'; Kuzma 58'; Hodek 81'	Stadium: Stadium Myjava; Attendance: 2,561; Referee: Ľubomír Samotný; Assistant referees: Tomáš Somoláni, Karol Poláček

12 April 2014 26	Slovan Bratislava	0–1	Spartak Myjava	Bratislava
15:00 CEST (UTC+2)	Gorosito (yellow card) 80'	Report	Pekár 37'	Stadium: Pasienky; Attendance: 1,525; Referee: Štefan Leško; Assistant referees: Gabriel Ádám, Henrich Mikulaj

19 April 2014 27	Spartak Myjava	2–0	Senica	Myjava
19:00 CEST (UTC+2)	Kosík 59'; Pekár (yellow card) 76'; Černáček 85'	Report	Hiago (yellow card) 38'; Kosorin (red card) 90'	Stadium: Stadium Myjava; Attendance: 2,573; Referee: Richard Trutz; Assistant referees: Peter Bóllo, Rastislav Žákech

28 April 2014 28	Trenčín	4–1	Spartak Myjava	Trenčín
18:30 CEST (UTC+2)	Simon 20', 65'; Baéz (yellow card) 26'; Hajradinović 46'; Holúbek 80'	Report	Černáček 73'	Stadium: Štadión na Sihoti; Attendance: 2,517; Referee: Marek Mastiš; Assistant referees: Michal Tomčík, Radoslav Bobko

3 May 2014 29	Spartak Myjava	1–1	DAC Dunajská Streda	Myjava
20:00 CEST (UTC+2)	Oršula 18'; Siva (yellow card) 89'	Report	Matúš 55'; Čaušić (yellow card) 65'	Stadium: Stadium Myjava; Attendance: 1,573; Referee: Pavol Chmura; Assistant referees: Ondrej Brendza, Dušan Petríček

10 May 2014 30	Spartak Myjava	0–1	Košice	Myjava
17:30 CEST (UTC+2)	Černáček (yellow card) 55'; D. Duga (yellow card) 90'	Report	Kavka (yellow card) 60'; Viazanko 89'	Stadium: Stadium Myjava; Attendance: 1,621; Referee: Július Straka; Assistant referees: Roman Slyško, Marián Jankovič

17 May 2014 31	Ružomberok	5–0	Spartak Myjava	Ružomberok
17:30 CEST (UTC+2)	Zreľák 34', 49', 72'; Bartoš 44'; Almaský 52'; Maslo (yellow card) 60'	Report	Černáček (yellow card) 74'	Stadium: Štadión MFK Ružomberok; Attendance: 1,018; Referee: Dušan Sedlák; Assistant referees: Tomáš Vorel, Peter Bednár

20 May 2014 32	Žilina	1–0	Spartak Myjava	Žilina
17:30 CEST (UTC+2)	Pečovský 57'	Report		Stadium: Štadión pod Dubňom; Attendance: 1,057; Referee: Boris Marhefka; Assistant referees: Erik Weiss, Mário Roszbeck

31 May 2014 33	ViOn Zlaté Moravce	1–2	Spartak Myjava	Zlaté Moravce
17:30 CEST (UTC+2)	Charizopulos 52'	Report	D. Duga 13'; Urgela 38'; Beňo (yellow card) 73'	Stadium: Štadión FC ViOn; Attendance: 1,020; Referee: Filip Glova; Assistant referees: Roman Slyško, Peter Bednár

=== Slovak Cup ===
28 August 2013 Second round	Nemšová	1–0	Spartak Myjava	Nemšová
17:00 CEST (UTC+2)	Červený (yellow card) 45'; Laco 55'; Kopúň (yellow card) 90'	Report	Šulek (yellow card) 89'; Sládek (penalty missed) 90'	Stadium: FK Slovan Nemšová; Attendance: 400; Referee: Adam Somoláni; Assistant referees: Peter Bednár, Branislav Hrdlička
