= List of Slovak football transfers winter 2013–14 =

This is a list of Slovak football transfers in the winter transfer window 2013–14 by club. Only transfers of the Corgoň Liga and 2. liga are included.

== Corgoň Liga ==
=== ŠK Slovan Bratislava ===
In: Note: Flags indicate national team as defined under FIFA eligibility rules; some limited exceptions apply. Players may hold more than one non-FIFA nationality.

No.	Pos.	Nation	Player
—	GK	SVK	Dušan Perniš (loan return from FC Nitra)
—	FW	SVK	Ákos Szarka (loan return from FK DAC 1904 Dunajská Streda)
—	MF	SVK	Tomáš Bagi (loan return from FC Nitra)
—	DF	SVK	Dávid Hudák (loan return from FK DAC 1904 Dunajská Streda)

Out: Note: Flags indicate national team as defined under FIFA eligibility rules; some limited exceptions apply. Players may hold more than one non-FIFA nationality.

No.	Pos.	Nation	Player
—	DF	SVK	Erik Čikoš (on loan to (Scotland) Ross County F.C.)
—	MF	ARG	Facundo Serra (Released)
—	FW	SVK	Ákos Szarka (on loan to FK DAC 1904 Dunajská Streda)
—	MF	SVK	Matej Jakúbek (on loan to FK DAC 1904 Dunajská Streda)
—	GK	SVK	Matúš Putnocký (on loan to FC Nitra)
—	MF	SVK	Radoslav Augustín (on loan to FC Nitra)

=== FK Senica ===
In: Note: Flags indicate national team as defined under FIFA eligibility rules; some limited exceptions apply. Players may hold more than one non-FIFA nationality.

No.	Pos.	Nation	Player
22	DF	BRA	Vitor Gava (from (Brazil) Arapongas)
21	DF	SVK	Róbert Mazáň (from FK AS Trenčín)
17	DF	SVK	Róbert Pillár (loan return from (Czech Republic) FC Hradec Králové)
—	DF	SVK	Miroslav Sedlák (loan return from FK DAC 1904 Dunajská Streda)
20	DF	UKR	Andriy Slinkin (on loan from (Ukraine) FC Chornomorets Odesa)
—	MF	SVK	Peter Štepanovský (loan return from FC Spartak Trnava)
9	FW	SVK	Milan Ferenčík (from Spartak Myjava)
—	FW	CZE	Petr Hošek (loan return from FK DAC 1904 Dunajská Streda)
14	FW	NGR	Christian Irobiso (from (Portugal) F.C. Paços de Ferreira)
11	FW	URU	Sebastián Sosa (on loan from (Italy) U.S. Città di Palermo)

Out: Note: Flags indicate national team as defined under FIFA eligibility rules; some limited exceptions apply. Players may hold more than one non-FIFA nationality.

No.	Pos.	Nation	Player
—	GK	SVK	Ján Malec (on loan to FK Pohronie)
—	DF	CZE	Erich Brabec (Released and he joined (Czech Republic) Bohemians 1905)
—	DF	CZE	Pavel Čermák (on loan to (Czech Republic) FC Hradec Králové)
—	DF	SVK	Michal Habánek (loan return to FC Spartak Trnava)
—	DF	SVK	Juraj Križko (to (Czech Republic) FC Hradec Králové)
—	DF	SVK	Róbert Pillár (on loan to FC Nitra)
—	DF	SVK	Miroslav Sedlák (on loan to OTJ Palárikovo)
—	DF	SVK	Peter Šenk (on loan to FK Pohronie)
—	MF	SVK	Peter Štepanovský (to (Armenia) FC Banants)
—	MF	CZE	Martin Zeman (loan return to (Czech Republic) AC Sparta Prague)
—	FW	CIV	Lamine Diarrassouba (to (Czech Republic) 1. SC Znojmo)
—	FW	CZE	Jaroslav Diviš (to (Czech Republic) 1. FC Slovácko)
—	FW	SVK	Alexander Jakubov (loan return to (Czech Republic) AC Sparta Prague)
—	FW	GER	Juvhel Tsoumou (Released)

=== FK AS Trenčín ===
In: Note: Flags indicate national team as defined under FIFA eligibility rules; some limited exceptions apply. Players may hold more than one non-FIFA nationality.

No.	Pos.	Nation	Player
—	FW	BRA	Jairo (from (Brazil) Madureira Esporte Clube)
—	DF	NGR	Madu Kingsley (from (Nigeria) El-Kanemi Warriors)
—	FW	NGR	Moses Simon (from (Nigeria) GBS Academy)
—	FW	NED	Gino van Kessel (on loan from (Netherlands) AFC Ajax)
—	MF	SVK	Lukáš Ďuriška (loan return from (Malta) Mosta F.C.)

Out: Note: Flags indicate national team as defined under FIFA eligibility rules; some limited exceptions apply. Players may hold more than one non-FIFA nationality.

No.	Pos.	Nation	Player
—	FW	NED	Gino van Kessel (loan return to (Netherlands) AFC Ajax)
—	FW	BRA	William (loan return to (Brazil) Botafogo de Futebol e Regatas and he signed contract with MŠK Žilina)
—	MF	SVK	Tomáš Brigant (to (Czech Republic) FC Zbrojovka Brno)
—	DF	SVK	Róbert Mazáň (to FK Senica)

=== Spartak Myjava ===
In: Note: Flags indicate national team as defined under FIFA eligibility rules; some limited exceptions apply. Players may hold more than one non-FIFA nationality.

No.	Pos.	Nation	Player
—	GK	SVK	Tomáš Belic (from FK DAC 1904 Dunajská Streda)
—	DF	SVK	Lukáš Beňo (from FK DAC 1904 Dunajská Streda)
—	MF	SVK	Frederik Bílovský (from MFK Dubnica)
—	FW	SVK	Roland Šmahajčík (from MFK Dubnica)
—	MF	SVK	Denis Duga (on loan from (Czech Republic) SK Slavia Prague)
—	MF	SVK	Matej Kováč (loan return from MFK Vrbové)
—	FW	SVK	Filip Oršula (from (Germany) MSV Duisburg)
—	GK	SVK	Tomáš Sládeček (from (Czech Republic) TJ Kordárna Velká nad Veličkou)
—	FW	SVK	Matúš Jorík (from MFK Vrbové)
—	GK	SVK	Roman Černák (from FK Turani)

Out: Note: Flags indicate national team as defined under FIFA eligibility rules; some limited exceptions apply. Players may hold more than one non-FIFA nationality.

No.	Pos.	Nation	Player
—	GK	SVK	Matej Székely (loan return to FC Spartak Trnava)
—	DF	SVK	Miroslav Duga (Released)
—	DF	SVK	Filip Lukšík (Released)
—	MF	SVK	Peter Kuračka (loan return to FC Spartak Trnava)
—	MF	SVK	Lukáš Pelegríni (loan return to FC ŠTK 1914 Šamorín)
—	FW	SVK	Milan Ferenčík (to FK Senica)
—	MF	SVK	Vladimír Kukoľ (to (Czech Republic) FC Vysočina Jihlava)
—	GK	SVK	Erik Jurica (on loan to MFK Vrbové)
—	DF	SVK	Martin Vavák (on loan to MFK Stará Turá)
—	MF	SVK	Marek Jastráb (on loan to MFK Dubnica)
—	FW	SVK	Matúš Jorík (on loan to MFK Vrbové)

=== MFK Košice ===
In: Note: Flags indicate national team as defined under FIFA eligibility rules; some limited exceptions apply. Players may hold more than one non-FIFA nationality.

No.	Pos.	Nation	Player

Out: Note: Flags indicate national team as defined under FIFA eligibility rules; some limited exceptions apply. Players may hold more than one non-FIFA nationality.

No.	Pos.	Nation	Player
—	DF	SVK	Radoslav Gondoľ (End of contract)
—	MF	SVK	Juraj Hovančík (End of contact)
—	FW	FRA	Karim Coulibaly Diaby (on loan to (Czech Republic) MFK Karviná)
—	MF	SVK	Ondrej Duda (to (Poland) Legia Warsaw)

=== MFK Ružomberok ===
In: Note: Flags indicate national team as defined under FIFA eligibility rules; some limited exceptions apply. Players may hold more than one non-FIFA nationality.

No.	Pos.	Nation	Player
—	MF	SVK	Július Szöke (on loan from ŽP Šport Podbrezová)

Out: Note: Flags indicate national team as defined under FIFA eligibility rules; some limited exceptions apply. Players may hold more than one non-FIFA nationality.

No.	Pos.	Nation	Player
—	GK	SVK	Tomáš Lešňovský (Released)
—	DF	SVK	Michal Janec (loan return to (Czech Republic) FC Slovan Liberec)
—	DF	BIH	Adi Mehremić (Released)
—	FW	SVK	Miloš Lačný (to (Kazakhstan) FC Kairat)

=== MŠK Žilina ===
In: Note: Flags indicate national team as defined under FIFA eligibility rules; some limited exceptions apply. Players may hold more than one non-FIFA nationality.

No.	Pos.	Nation	Player
—	FW	BRA	William (from (Brazil) Botafogo de Futebol e Regatas)
—	FW	SVK	Pavol Jurčo (from MFK Zemplín Michalovce)

Out: Note: Flags indicate national team as defined under FIFA eligibility rules; some limited exceptions apply. Players may hold more than one non-FIFA nationality.

No.	Pos.	Nation	Player
—	DF	TOG	Serge Akakpo (Released and he joined (Ukraine) FC Hoverla Uzhhorod)
—	DF	GAM	Ali Ceesay (Released)
—	DF	POR	Ricardo Nunes (Released)
—	FW	SVK	Marek Zuziak (on loan to MFK Tatran Liptovský Mikuláš)
—	MF	BEN	Babatounde Bello (Released)
—	MF	SVK	Roman Gergel (Released)
—	GK	SVK	Martin Dúbravka (Released and he joined (Denmark) Esbjerg fB)
—	DF	SVK	Vladimír Leitner (End of career)
—	FW	SVK	Tomáš Majtán (Released and he joined (Poland) Śląsk Wrocław)
—	FW	SVK	Róbert Pich (to (Poland) Śląsk Wrocław)
—	MF	SVK	Michal Mravec (to (Poland) Podbeskidzie Bielsko-Biała)

=== FC ViOn Zlaté Moravce ===
In: Note: Flags indicate national team as defined under FIFA eligibility rules; some limited exceptions apply. Players may hold more than one non-FIFA nationality.

No.	Pos.	Nation	Player
—	FW	SVK	Karol Pavelka (from (Czech Republic) MFK Karviná)
—	MF	SVK	Márius Charizopulos (on loan from ČFK Nitra)
—	FW	BIH	Irfan Hadžić (from (Croatia) NK Inter Zaprešić)
—	GK	SVK	Jozef Novota (on loan from OFK Sľažany)
—	FW	SVK	Ladislav Žák (loan return from MFK Topvar Topoľčany)

Out: Note: Flags indicate national team as defined under FIFA eligibility rules; some limited exceptions apply. Players may hold more than one non-FIFA nationality.

No.	Pos.	Nation	Player
—	MF	SVK	Patrik Sabo (loan return to ŠK Slovan Bratislava)
—	DF	SVK	Róbert Vaniš (loan return to ŠK Slovan Bratislava)
—	MF	SVK	Michal Obročník (loan return to (Czech Republic) FC Slovan Liberec)
—	FW	SVK	Ľubomír Bernáth (Released)
—	DF	SVK	Peter Farkaš (on loan to FK Spartak Vráble)

=== FK Dukla Banská Bystrica ===
In: Note: Flags indicate national team as defined under FIFA eligibility rules; some limited exceptions apply. Players may hold more than one non-FIFA nationality.

No.	Pos.	Nation	Player
—	MF	CZE	Jan Kliment (on loan from (Czech Republic) FC Vysočina Jihlava)
—	DF	SRB	Dušan Plavšić (on loan from (Czech Republic) FC Vysočina Jihlava)
—	FW	CZE	David Střihavka (from (Lebanon) Al Ahed)

Out: Note: Flags indicate national team as defined under FIFA eligibility rules; some limited exceptions apply. Players may hold more than one non-FIFA nationality.

No.	Pos.	Nation	Player
—	GK	CZE	Dominik Rodinger (End of contract)
—	FW	SVK	Matúš Marcin (loan return to (Czech Republic) FC Vysočina Jihlava)
—	MF	SVK	Jakub Brašeň (Released)
—	DF	SVK	Matúš Turňa (Released)
—	FW	SVK	Pavol Jurčo (loan return to MFK Zemplín Michalovce and he signed contract with MŠK Žilina)
—	DF	SVK	Ivan Šnirc (on loan to FK DAC 1904 Dunajská Streda)

=== FC Nitra ===
In: Note: Flags indicate national team as defined under FIFA eligibility rules; some limited exceptions apply. Players may hold more than one non-FIFA nationality.

No.	Pos.	Nation	Player
—	DF	GHA	John Mensah (from (France) Stade Rennais F.C.)
—	GK	SVK	Matúš Putnocký (on loan from ŠK Slovan Bratislava)
—	MF	SVK	Radoslav Augustín (on loan from ŠK Slovan Bratislava)
—	FW	SVK	Matúš Mikuš (from (Austria) FC Admira Wacker Mödling)
—	DF	SVK	Jaroslav Kolbas (on loan from 1. FC Tatran Prešov)
—	DF	SVK	Róbert Pillár (on loan from FK Senica)
—	DF	SVK	Martin Husár (from (Czech Republic) FC Zbrojovka Brno)
—	FW	CZE	Jiří Böhm (from (Czech Republic) SK Zápy)
—	MF	GBS	Vladimir Soares Forbs (from (Japan) FC Osaka)
—	MF	NGR	Franklin Ekene Igwe (from (Czech Republic) FC Fastav Zlín)

Out: Note: Flags indicate national team as defined under FIFA eligibility rules; some limited exceptions apply. Players may hold more than one non-FIFA nationality.

No.	Pos.	Nation	Player
—	GK	SVK	Dušan Perniš (loan return to ŠK Slovan Bratislava)
—	MF	SVK	Miloš Šimončič (Released)
—	DF	CZE	Martin Hála (loan return to (Czech Republic) SK Sigma Olomouc)
—	FW	CZE	Adam Ševčík (loan return to (Czech Republic) SK Sigma Olomouc)
—	DF	SVK	Jaroslav Kolbas (End of contract)
—	DF	SVK	Tomáš Bagi (loan return to ŠK Slovan Bratislava)
—	MF	SVK	Boris Turčák (loan return to ŠK Slovan Bratislava)
—	MF	SVK	Adrián Čermák (loan return to ŠK Slovan Bratislava)
—	GK	SVK	Martin Chudý (Released)
—	MF	SVK	Vratislav Gajdoš (Released)
—	FW	SVK	Tomáš Vestenický (on loan to (Italy) Roma)
—	DF	ESP	Eric Barroso (Released)
—	DF	CZE	Petr Kaspřák (Released)

=== FC Spartak Trnava ===
In: Note: Flags indicate national team as defined under FIFA eligibility rules; some limited exceptions apply. Players may hold more than one non-FIFA nationality.

No.	Pos.	Nation	Player
—	GK	SVK	Matej Székely (loan return from TJ Spartak Myjava)
—	MF	SVK	Peter Kuračka (loan return from TJ Spartak Myjava)
—	DF	SVK	Michal Habánek (loan return from FK Senica)
—	MF	CZE	Martin Vyskočil (loan return from (Czech Republic) SK Dynamo České Budějovice)
—	MF	SVK	Michal Gašparík (from FK DAC 1904 Dunajská Streda)
—	DF	SVK	Patrik Čarnota (from (Poland) GKS Tychy)
—	GK	SRB	Bojan Knežević (from (Serbia) FK Milutinac Zemun)
—	MF	SVK	Christián Steinhübel (loan return from FK DAC 1904 Dunajská Streda)

Out: Note: Flags indicate national team as defined under FIFA eligibility rules; some limited exceptions apply. Players may hold more than one non-FIFA nationality.

No.	Pos.	Nation	Player
—	MF	SVK	Peter Štepanovský (loan return to FK Senica)
—	FW	CZE	Tomáš Poznar (loan return to (Czech Republic) FC Fastav Zlín)
—	MF	SLO	Matic Maruško (Released)
—	DF	SVK	Jozef Adámik (Released)
—	DF	SVK	Martin Klabník (on loan to FK DAC 1904 Dunajská Streda)

=== FK DAC 1904 Dunajská Streda ===
In: Note: Flags indicate national team as defined under FIFA eligibility rules; some limited exceptions apply. Players may hold more than one non-FIFA nationality.

No.	Pos.	Nation	Player
—	FW	CMR	Francky N'Guekam (from (France) Calais RUFC)
—	GK	SVK	Pavol Penksa (on loan from MFK Ružomberok)
—	DF	CRO	Andrej Čaušić (from (Hungary) Pécsi MFC)
—	DF	SVK	Ivan Šnirc (on loan from FK Dukla Banská Bystrica)
—	MF	CRO	Darijo Krišto (from (Croatia) NK Dugopolje)
—	MF	SVK	Jakub Brašeň (from FK Dukla Banská Bystrica)
—	DF	SVK	Matúš Turňa (from FK Dukla Banská Bystrica)
—	DF	SVK	Otto Szabó (from (Hungary) Lombard-Pápa TFC)
—	MF	SVK	Gábor Straka (from MŠK - Thermál Veľký Meder)
—	FW	SRB	Samir Nurković (on loan from MFK Košice)
—	MF	SVK	Roman Gergel (on loan from MŠK Žilina)
—	FW	SVK	Ákos Szarka (on loan from ŠK Slovan Bratislava)
—	MF	SVK	Matej Jakúbek (on loan from ŠK Slovan Bratislava)
—	DF	AUT	Taner Ari (from (Austria) SKN St. Pölten)
—	MF	SVK	Róbert Valenta (from (Czech Republic) AC Sparta Prague)
—	DF	SVK	Martin Klabník (on loan from FC Spartak Trnava)
—	FW	BIH	Nemanja Pušara (from (Bosnia and Herzegovina) FK Slavija)

Out: Note: Flags indicate national team as defined under FIFA eligibility rules; some limited exceptions apply. Players may hold more than one non-FIFA nationality.

No.	Pos.	Nation	Player
—	DF	SVK	Miroslav Sedlák (loan return to FK Senica)
—	FW	CZE	Petr Hošek (loan return to FK Senica)
—	FW	SVK	Ákos Szarka (loan return to ŠK Slovan Bratislava)
—	GK	SVK	Tomáš Belic (to Spartak Myjava)
—	DF	SVK	Lukáš Beňo (to Spartak Myjava)
—	MF	SVK	Michal Gašparík (to FC Spartak Trnava)
—	FW	BIH	Muris Mešanović (loan return to (Czech Republic) FC Vysočina Jihlava)
—	MF	SVK	Juraj Kuráň (loan return to ŠK Slovan Bratislava juniori)
—	MF	SVK	Goran Antunovič (loan return to KFC Komárno)
—	DF	SVK	Dávid Hudák (loan return to ŠK Slovan Bratislava)
—	FW	CZE	Dušan Nulíček (Released)
—	GK	SVK	Michal Bojnanský (loan return to ŠK Slovan Bratislava)
—	FW	BIH	Nemanja Pušara (on loan to ŠK SFM Senec)
—	MF	SVK	Christián Steinhübel (loan return to FC Spartak Trnava)

== 2. liga ==
=== 1. FC Tatran Prešov ===
In: Note: Flags indicate national team as defined under FIFA eligibility rules; some limited exceptions apply. Players may hold more than one non-FIFA nationality.

No.	Pos.	Nation	Player
—	MF	SVK	Ján Dzurík (loan return from Partizán Bardejov)
—	FW	SVK	Ľuboš Belejík (loan return from OFK - SIM Raslavice)
—	FW	SVK	Lukáš Makara (on loan from TJ Budovateľ Žehňa)
—	FW	SVK	Richard Grajcar (loan return from TJ Šľachtiteľ Malý Šariš)
—	DF	SVK	Artúr Benes (loan return from Partizán Bardejov)

Out: Note: Flags indicate national team as defined under FIFA eligibility rules; some limited exceptions apply. Players may hold more than one non-FIFA nationality.

No.	Pos.	Nation	Player
—	DF	SVK	Richard Kačala (to (Poland) Sandecja Nowy Sącz)
—	FW	SVK	Jozef Dolný (on loan to (Czech Republic) FC Zbrojovka Brno)

=== ŽP Šport Podbrezová ===
In: Note: Flags indicate national team as defined under FIFA eligibility rules; some limited exceptions apply. Players may hold more than one non-FIFA nationality.

No.	Pos.	Nation	Player
—	FW	SRB	Igor Ležaić (on loan from FC ŠTK 1914 Šamorín)

Out: Note: Flags indicate national team as defined under FIFA eligibility rules; some limited exceptions apply. Players may hold more than one non-FIFA nationality.

No.	Pos.	Nation	Player
—	MF	SVK	Július Szöke (on loan to MFK Ružomberok)
—	FW	NGR	Hector Tubonemi (on loan to FC ŠTK 1914 Šamorín)

=== ŠK SFM Senec ===
In: Note: Flags indicate national team as defined under FIFA eligibility rules; some limited exceptions apply. Players may hold more than one non-FIFA nationality.

No.	Pos.	Nation	Player
—	DF	SVK	Frederik Ravas (on loan from FK Senica)
—	FW	BIH	Nemanja Pušara (on loan from FK DAC 1904 Dunajská Streda)
—	MF	SVK	Andrej Urban (on loan from MFK Dubnica)
—	FW	SVK	Gabriel Bezák (on loan from FK AS Trenčín)
—	FW	SVK	Boris Turčák (on loan from ŠK Slovan Bratislava)

Out: Note: Flags indicate national team as defined under FIFA eligibility rules; some limited exceptions apply. Players may hold more than one non-FIFA nationality.

No.	Pos.	Nation	Player
—	MF	SVK	Radoslav Augustín (loan return to ŠK Slovan Bratislava)
—	DF	SVK	Roman Čejtei (loan return to ŠK Slovan Bratislava)
—	DF	SVK	Tomáš Hanzel (on loan to ŠKF Sereď)
—	DF	SVK	Martin Jurkemik (loan return to MFK Ružomberok)
—	MF	SVK	Rastislav Bakala (loan return to (Czech Republic) SK Dynamo České Budějovice)
—	DF	SVK	Dezider Egri (loan return to TJ Družstevník Vrakúň)
—	FW	SVK	Pavol Orolín (loan return to (Czech Republic) Bohemians 1905)
—	DF	SVK	Denis Šavara (Released)

=== Partizán Bardejov ===
In: Note: Flags indicate national team as defined under FIFA eligibility rules; some limited exceptions apply. Players may hold more than one non-FIFA nationality.

No.	Pos.	Nation	Player
—	FW	ARM	Gevorg Badalyan (from (Poland) Sandecja Nowy Sącz)
—	MF	CAN	Andrew Kliment (on loan from MFK Dolný Kubín)
—	MF	POL	Szymon Gruca (from (Poland) MKS Orzeł Przeworsk)
—	MF	SVK	Martin Vasiliak (loan return from TJ Beloveža)

Out: Note: Flags indicate national team as defined under FIFA eligibility rules; some limited exceptions apply. Players may hold more than one non-FIFA nationality.

No.	Pos.	Nation	Player
—	DF	SVK	Artúr Benes (loan return to 1. FC Tatran Prešov)
—	MF	SVK	Ján Dzurík (loan return to 1. FC Tatran Prešov)
—	MF	SVK	Ján Petráš (loan return to FC Spartak Trnava)
—	MF	BRA	Dyjan (to (Czech Republic) FC Baník Ostrava)
—	FW	SVK	Stanislav Cuprišin (on loan to FC Lokomotíva Košice)
—	FW	SVK	Gabriel Pisárik (on loan to MFK Vranov nad Topľou)
—	DF	SVK	Miroslav Hanuščák (on loan to FK Gerlachov)
—	FW	SVK	Norbert Sališ (on loan to TJ ŠM Janíky)

=== FC ŠTK 1914 Šamorín ===
In: Note: Flags indicate national team as defined under FIFA eligibility rules; some limited exceptions apply. Players may hold more than one non-FIFA nationality.

No.	Pos.	Nation	Player
—	MF	SVK	Lukáš Pelegríni (loan return from Spartak Myjava)
—	FW	NGR	Hector Tubonemi (on loan from ŽP Šport Podbrezová)
—	GK	SVK	Juraj Hajduch (on loan from ŠK Slovan Bratislava)
—	FW	SVK	Lukáš Hutta (on loan from ŠK Slovan Bratislava)
—	MF	SVK	Samuel Füzik (from (Australia) Stirling Lions)
—	MF	SVK	Radoslav Krištan (from (Czech Republic) MFK Karviná)

Out: Note: Flags indicate national team as defined under FIFA eligibility rules; some limited exceptions apply. Players may hold more than one non-FIFA nationality.

No.	Pos.	Nation	Player
—	FW	SRB	Igor Ležaić (on loan to ŽP Šport Podbrezová)
—	MF	SVK	Lukáš Pelegríni (to FK Pohronie)
—	GK	SVK	Július Pentek (to (Austria) UFC Pama)
—	FW	GUI	Seybou Sidibe (loan return to ŠK Slovan Bratislava)
—	MF	CAN	Andrew Kliment (loan return to MFK Dolný Kubín)
—	DF	MKD	Filip Gligorov (loan return to FK Podkonice)
—	MF	SVK	Denis Jančovič (to MFK Topvar Topoľčany)
—	MF	SRB	Miodrag Jovanović (to Serbia)
—	FW	SRB	Lazar Cvejić (to Serbia)

=== FK Slovan Duslo Šaľa ===
In: Note: Flags indicate national team as defined under FIFA eligibility rules; some limited exceptions apply. Players may hold more than one non-FIFA nationality.

No.	Pos.	Nation	Player
—	FW	SVK	Marek Košút (from FKM Nové Zámky)

Out: Note: Flags indicate national team as defined under FIFA eligibility rules; some limited exceptions apply. Players may hold more than one non-FIFA nationality.

No.	Pos.	Nation	Player
—	MF	SVK	Márius Charizopulos (loan return to ČFK Nitra)

=== MFK Zemplín Michalovce ===
In: Note: Flags indicate national team as defined under FIFA eligibility rules; some limited exceptions apply. Players may hold more than one non-FIFA nationality.

No.	Pos.	Nation	Player
—	FW	SVK	Pavol Jurčo (loan return from FK Dukla Banská Bystrica)
—	FW	CZE	Pavel Čapek (on loan from (Czech Republic) FK Dukla Prague)
—	MF	CZE	Jan Micka (on loan from (Czech Republic) FK Dukla Prague)
—	MF	ESP	Samuel Bayón (from (Spain) Free Agent)

Out: Note: Flags indicate national team as defined under FIFA eligibility rules; some limited exceptions apply. Players may hold more than one non-FIFA nationality.

No.	Pos.	Nation	Player
—	MF	SVK	Miroslav Božok (to (Poland) Górnik Łęczna)
—	DF	SVK	Igor Obert (Released)
—	DF	SVK	Michal Vanák (End of contract)
—	FW	SVK	Pavol Jurčo (to MŠK Žilina)
—	MF	SVK	Róbert Kovaľ (to (Czech Republic) FK Dukla Prague)

=== MŠK Rimavská Sobota ===
In: Note: Flags indicate national team as defined under FIFA eligibility rules; some limited exceptions apply. Players may hold more than one non-FIFA nationality.

No.	Pos.	Nation	Player

Out: Note: Flags indicate national team as defined under FIFA eligibility rules; some limited exceptions apply. Players may hold more than one non-FIFA nationality.

No.	Pos.	Nation	Player

=== MFK Dubnica ===
In: Note: Flags indicate national team as defined under FIFA eligibility rules; some limited exceptions apply. Players may hold more than one non-FIFA nationality.

No.	Pos.	Nation	Player

Out: Note: Flags indicate national team as defined under FIFA eligibility rules; some limited exceptions apply. Players may hold more than one non-FIFA nationality.

No.	Pos.	Nation	Player
—	MF	SVK	Frederik Bílovský (to Spartak Myjava)
—	FW	SVK	Roland Šmahajčík (to Spartak Myjava)
—	DF	SVK	Marcel Ondráš (to (Poland) Polonia Bytom)

=== MFK Tatran Liptovský Mikuláš ===
In: Note: Flags indicate national team as defined under FIFA eligibility rules; some limited exceptions apply. Players may hold more than one non-FIFA nationality.

No.	Pos.	Nation	Player
—	FW	SVK	Marek Zuziak (on loan from MŠK Žilina)
—	FW	MNE	Nemanja Asanović (from (Montenegro) FK Budućnost Podgorica)
—	DF	SRB	Goran Matić (from (Serbia) FK Inđija)
—	DF	SVK	Matúš Hubočan (on loan from MŠK Žilina)

Out: Note: Flags indicate national team as defined under FIFA eligibility rules; some limited exceptions apply. Players may hold more than one non-FIFA nationality.

No.	Pos.	Nation	Player

=== FC Spartak Trnava juniori ===
In: Note: Flags indicate national team as defined under FIFA eligibility rules; some limited exceptions apply. Players may hold more than one non-FIFA nationality.

No.	Pos.	Nation	Player

Out: Note: Flags indicate national team as defined under FIFA eligibility rules; some limited exceptions apply. Players may hold more than one non-FIFA nationality.

No.	Pos.	Nation	Player
—	MF	SLO	Matic Maruško (Released)
—	MF	SVK	Peter Zvolenský (End of contract)

=== FK Pohronie ===
In: Note: Flags indicate national team as defined under FIFA eligibility rules; some limited exceptions apply. Players may hold more than one non-FIFA nationality.

No.	Pos.	Nation	Player
—	MF	SVK	Lukáš Pelegríni (from FC ŠTK 1914 Šamorín)
—	GK	SVK	Ján Malec (on loan from FK Senica)
—	DF	SVK	Peter Šenk (on loan to FK Senica)
—	FW	SVK	Pavol Orolín (from (Czech Republic) Bohemians 1905)
—	FW	SVK	Marián Adam (from (Austria) SC Marchtrenk)

Out: Note: Flags indicate national team as defined under FIFA eligibility rules; some limited exceptions apply. Players may hold more than one non-FIFA nationality.

No.	Pos.	Nation	Player

== See also ==
- 2013–14 Corgoň Liga
- 2013–14 2. liga
