= 2014–15 Slovak First Football League =

2014 sporting event in Slovakia

Fortuna Liga
- Season: 2014–15
- Dates: 11 July 2014 – 30 May 2015
- Champions: AS Trenčín; 1st title
- Relegated: MFK Košice; Dukla Banská Bystrica
- Champions League: AS Trenčín
- Europa League: Žilina; Spartak Trnava; Slovan Bratislava
- Matches: 198
- Goals: 531 (2.68 per match)
- Top goalscorer: Matej Jelić, Jan Kalabiška (19 goals)
- Biggest home win: Žilina 5–1 Ružomberok
- Biggest away win: Košice 1–3 Zlaté Moravce
- Highest scoring: Trnava 5–2 B.Bystrica
- Highest attendance: 6,397 (Žilina – Trenčín)
- Lowest attendance: 448 (B.Bystrica – Senica), (B.Bystrica – Ružomberok)
- Average attendance: ▼1978
- All statistics correct as of 4 June 2015.

The 2014–15 Slovak First Football League (known as the Slovak Fortuna Liga for sponsorship reasons) was the 22nd season of first-tier football league in Slovakia, since its establishment in 1993. This season started on 11 July 2014. ŠK Slovan Bratislava were the defending champions.

== Teams ==
A total of 12 teams competed in the league, including 11 sides from the 2013–14 season and one promoted from the 2. liga.

Relegation for FC Nitra to the 2014–15 DOXXbet liga was confirmed on 20 May 2014. The one relegated team was replaced by ŽP Šport Podbrezová.

=== Stadiums and locations ===
Location of teams in Fortuna Liga 2014–15

Team	Home city	Stadium	Capacity	2013–14 season
AS Trenčín	Trenčín	Stadium na Sihoti	4,500	Corgoň Liga runners-up
DAC Dunajská Streda	Dunajská Streda	Mestský štadión	16,410	11th in Corgoň Liga
Dukla Banská Bystrica	Banská Bystrica	SNP Stadium	10,000	8th in Corgoň Liga
ŽP Šport Podbrezová	Podbrezová	Stadium Kolkáreň	4,500	2. liga champions
FK Senica	Senica	Stadium FK Senica	4,500	6th in Corgoň Liga
MFK Košice	Košice	Stadium Lokomotívy v Čermeli	9,000	5th in Corgoň Liga
MFK Ružomberok	Ružomberok	Štadión pod Čebraťom	4,817	4th in Corgoň Liga
MŠK Žilina	Žilina	Stadium pod Dubňom	11,181	9th in Corgoň Liga
Slovan Bratislava	Bratislava	Pasienky	12,000	Corgoň Liga champions
Spartak Myjava	Myjava	Stadium Myjava	2,709	7th in Corgoň Liga
Spartak Trnava	Trnava	Stadium Antona Malatinského	3,350	3rd in Corgoň Liga
ViOn Zlaté Moravce	Zlaté Moravce	FC ViOn Stadium	4,000	10th in Corgoň Liga

== Personnel and kits ==
Team	President	Manager	Captain	Kitmaker	Shirt sponsor
AS Trenčín	Tscheu La Ling	(Slovakia) Martin Ševela	Peter Kleščík	Nike	Aegon
DAC Dunajská Streda	Oszkár Világi	(Croatia) Tomislav Marić	Otto Szabó	Adidas	Kukkonia
Dukla Banská Bystrica	Martin Poljovka	(Slovakia) Štefan Rusnák	Peter Boroš	Adidas	
FO ŽP Šport Podbrezová	Július Kriváň	(Slovakia) Branislav Benko	Ivan Minčič	Adidas	Železiarne Podbrezová
FK Senica	Viktor Blažek	(Slovakia) Eduard Pagáč	Tomáš Kóňa	hummel	
MFK Košice	Blažej Podolák	(Slovakia) Marek Fabuľa	Peter Šinglár	Jako	Steel Trans
MFK Ružomberok	Milan Fiľo	(Slovakia) Ivan Galád	Marek Sapara	Adidas	MAESTRO
MŠK Žilina	Jozef Antošík	(Slovakia) Adrián Guľa	Viktor Pečovský	Nike	Preto
Slovan Bratislava	Ivan Kmotrík	(Slovakia) Dusan Tittel	Martin Dobrotka	Adidas	Niké
Spartak Myjava	Pavel Halabrín	(Slovakia) Peter Gergely	Martin Černáček	Uhlsport	NAD RESS
Spartak Trnava	Michal Pethö	(Slovakia) Juraj Jarábek	Marek Janečka	Adidas	Škoda Transportation
ViOn Zlaté Moravce	Karol Škula	(Slovakia) Branislav Mráz	Július Szöke	Erreà	ViOn

=== Managerial changes ===
Team	Outgoing manager	Manner of departure	Date of vacancy	Position in table	Replaced by	Date of appointment
Spartak Myjava	(Slovakia) Radúz Dorňák	Sacked	31 May 2014	Pre-season	(Slovakia) Peter Gergely	1 June 2014
MFK Ružomberok	(Czech Republic) Jozef Chovanec	End of contract	30 June 2014	Pre-season	(Slovakia) Ladislav Šimčo	5 June 2014
ŠK Slovan Bratislava	(Slovakia) Dušan Galis	Mutual agreement	13 June 2014	Pre-season	(Czech Republic) František Straka	11 June 2014
ŠK Slovan Bratislava	(Czech Republic) František Straka	Mutual agreement	7 October 2014	5th	(Czech Republic) Jozef Chovanec	16 October 2014
FK Dukla Banská Bystrica	(Slovakia) Norbert Hrnčár	Sacked	9 October 2014	12th	(Slovakia) Štefan Rusnák	9 October 2014
MFK Ružomberok	(Slovakia) Ladislav Šimčo	Sacked	17 November 2014	12th	(Slovakia) Ivan Galád	17 November 2015
MFK Košice	(Czech Republic) Radoslav Látal	End by own request	29 November 2014	7th	(Slovakia) Marek Fabuľa	29 November 2015
FK Senica	(Czech Republic) Pavel Hapal	Signs with Slovakia U21	23 December 2014	3rd	(Slovakia) Jozef Kostelník	4 January 2015
FC ViOn Zlaté Moravce	(Slovakia) Branislav Mráz	Sacked	12 January 2015	10th	(Slovakia) Ladislav Totkovič	12 January 2015
FC DAC 1904 Dunajská Streda	(Slovakia) Mikuláš Radványi	Sacked	17 January 2015	9th	(Croatia) Tomislav Marić	17 January 2015
FO ŽP Šport Podbrezová	(Slovakia) Jaroslav Kentoš	Sacked	17 February 2015	8th	(Slovakia) Jozef Mores	24 February 2015
ŠK Slovan Bratislava	(Czech Republic) Jozef Chovanec	Sacked	6 April 2015	5th	(Slovakia) Dušan Tittel	7 April 2015
FK Senica	(Slovakia) Jozef Kostelník	Mutual agreement	8 May 2015	5th	(Slovakia) Eduard Pagáč	8 May 2015

== League table ==
Pos	Team	Pld	W	D	L	GF	GA	GD	Pts	Qualification or relegation
1	Trenčín (C)	33	23	5	5	67	28	+39	74	Qualification for the Champions League second qualifying round
2	Žilina	33	20	9	4	68	25	+43	69	Qualification for the Europa League first qualifying round
3	Slovan Bratislava	33	18	3	12	49	42	+7	57	Qualification for the Europa League first qualifying round
4	Spartak Trnava	33	16	8	9	53	31	+22	56	Qualification for the Europa League first qualifying round
5	Senica	33	12	11	10	52	50	+2	47	
6	Košice (R)	33	11	8	14	43	48	−5	41	Relegation to 2. Liga (Note: MFK Košice did not obtain a licence for the 2015–16 season.)
7	Ružomberok	33	10	10	13	41	45	−4	40	
8	DAC Dunajská Streda	33	9	12	12	32	44	−12	39	
9	Spartak Myjava	33	11	6	16	38	53	−15	39	
10	ViOn Zlaté Moravce	33	8	8	17	27	54	−27	32	
11	Podbrezová	33	7	8	18	32	54	−22	29	
12	Dukla Banská Bystrica (R)	33	4	10	19	29	57	−28	22	Relegation to 2. Liga

Source: Niké liga (in Slovak)
Rules for classification: 1) Points; 2) Head-to-head points; 3) Head-to-head goal difference; 4) Head-to-head away goals scored; 5) Play-off.
(C) Champions; (R) Relegated

== Results ==
Home \ Away	DAC	BB	KOŠ	POD	RUŽ	SEN	SLO	MYJ	TRN	TRE	ZLM	ŽIL	DAC	BB	KOŠ	POD	RUŽ	SEN	SLO	MYJ	TRN	TRE	ZLM	ŽIL
DAC Dunajská Streda		0–0	3–1	1–0	1–1	3–0	1–1	1–0	0–0	3–2	1–1	2–2			1–1				0–3	1–0	0–1			0–1
Dukla Banská Bystrica	0–0		0–2	3–3	3–1	2–2	0–1	0–0	1–1	1–3	2–0	0–0	0–1				1–2	0–4				0–1		0–3
Košice	1–1	1–2		3–0	2–1	0–0	1–2	2–0	2–0	2–0	1–3	1–1		2–1		5–0		1–1	2–1		1–0		1–2	
Podbrezová	3–0	3–0	1–1		1–2	2–1	1–0	1–2	1–1	2–2	0–0	1–0	2–3	1–1						2–1			0–2	2–3
Ružomberok	1–1	1–1	1–1	2–0		2–1	1–2	2–2	0–0	1–1	3–0	0–1	2–1		1–0	2–0				2–1		0–1		1–1
Senica	2–1	3–2	3–1	1–1	1–0		2–1	1–0	1–1	1–1	2–0	1–1	4–0			3–0	4–2			1–1		0–4		1–2
Slovan Bratislava	0–1	3–1	3–0	2–1	2–1	4–1		0–1	1–1	0–2	2–1	0–2		1–0		2–1	1–0	4–1				1–3	1–0	
Myjava	3–1	2–1	0–2	1–0	1–1	1–2	2–1		2–0	2–1	2–0	1–4		3–2	1–1				3–6		0–3		2–2	
Spartak Trnava	3–1	5–2	3–1	0–1	2–0	2–2	4–0	5–1		1–0	3–0	1–0		3–1			2–1	4–2	0–0				3–0	
Trenčín	2–1	2–0	4–2	2–0	4–3	3–1	4–0	2–0	2–0		2–0	2–2	3–0		1–0	4–1				3–1	1–0			0–1
ViOn Zlaté Moravce	1–1	1–1	3–0	1–0	1–1	0–0	0–2	1–0	2–1	0–1		1–6	0–0	0–1			0–2	3–2				1–3		
Žilina	3–1	2–0	4–1	0–0	5–1	1–1	3–0	2–1	1–0	1–1	4–0				4–1				1–2	0–1	3–0		4–1	

Source: Niké liga (in Slovak)
Legend: Blue = home team win; Yellow = draw; Red = away team win.

== Season statistics ==
=== Top scorers ===
Updated through matches played on 30 May 2015.

Rank	Player	Club	Goals
1	(Czech Republic) Jan Kalabiška	FK Senica	19
1	(Croatia) Matej Jelić	MŠK Žilina	19
3	(Slovakia) Jaroslav Mihalík	MŠK Žilina	13
4	(Slovakia) Štefan Pekár	Spartak Myjava	11
4	(Slovakia) Ján Vlasko	Spartak Trnava	11
4	(Slovakia) Erik Sabo	Spartak Trnava	11
7	(Slovakia) Adam Zreľák	Slovan Bratislava/Ružomberok	10
7	(Slovakia) Martin Mikovič	Spartak Trnava	10
7	(Slovakia) Lukáš Čmelík	MŠK Žilina	10
7	(Bosnia and Herzegovina) Nermin Haskić	MFK Košice	10

=== Hat-tricks ===
Round	Player	For	Against	Result	Date	Ref
24	(Croatia) Matej Jelić	MŠK Žilina	MFK Košice	4–1	4 April 2015	
24	(Czech Republic) Jan Kalabiška	FK Senica	Dukla Banská Bystrica	0–4	4 April 2015	
26	(Slovakia) Martin Juhar	FC ViOn Zlaté Moravce	FK Senica	3–2	18 April 2015	

=== Clean sheets ===
Updated through matches played on 30 May 2015

Rank	Player	Club	Clean sheets
1	(Slovakia) Miloš Volešák	AS Trenčín/MŠK Žilina	11
2	(Slovakia) Igor Šemrinec	AS Trenčín	10
3	(Slovakia) Michal Šulla	FK Senica	8
4	(Slovakia) Pavel Kováč	FC ViOn Zlaté Moravce	7
4	(Slovakia) Peter Boroš	FK Dukla Banská Bystrica	7
6	(Slovakia) Andrej Maťašovský	FO ŽP Podbrezová	6
6	(Slovakia) Dobrivoj Rusov	FC Spartak Trnava	6
6	(Slovakia) Martin Krnáč	MŠK Žilina/Slovan Bratislava	6
9	(North Macedonia) Darko Tofiloski	MFK Košice	5
9	(Slovakia) Peter Solnička	Spartak Myjava	5
9	(Slovakia) Dušan Perniš	Slovan Bratislava	5

== Awards ==
=== Top Eleven ===
- Goalkeeper: (Slovakia) Miloš Volešák (AS Trenčín/MŠK Žilina)
- Defence: (Cameroon) Ernest Mabouka (MŠK Žilina), (Brazil) Ramón (AS Trenčín), (Slovakia) Milan Škriniar (MŠK Žilina), (Slovakia) Matúš Čonka (Spartak Trnava)
- Midfield: (Slovakia) Viktor Pečovský (MŠK Žilina), (Slovakia) Stanislav Lobotka (AS Trenčín), (Slovakia) Jaroslav Mihalík (MŠK Žilina), (Slovakia) Ján Vlasko (Spartak Trnava)
- Attack: (Czech Republic) Jan Kalabiška (FK Senica), (Croatia) Matej Jelić (MŠK Žilina)

=== Individual awards ===
Manager of the season

Martin Ševela and Ivan Vrabec (AS Trenčín)

Player of the Year

Viktor Pečovský (MŠK Žilina)

Young player of the Year

Matúš Bero (AS Trenčín)

== Attendances ==
#	Club	Average
1	DAC	3,315
2	Trenčín	2,870
3	Trnava	2,440
4	Železiarne	2,168
5	Žilina	2,157
6	Ružomberok	1,871
7	Senica	1,866
8	Košice	1,770
9	Myjava	1,532
10	Slovan	1,500
11	ViOn	1,164
12	Dukla	1,044

== See also ==
- 2014–15 Slovak Cup
- 2014–15 2. Liga (Slovakia)

=== Stats ===
- List of foreign players
- List of transfers summer 2014
- List of transfers winter 2014–15
