= 2013–14 Slovak First Football League =

Season of Slovak football

Corgoň Liga
- Season: 2013–14
- Dates: 12 July 2013 – 31 May 2014
- Champions: Slovan Bratislava; 8th title
- Relegated: FC Nitra
- Champions League: Slovan Bratislava
- Europa League: MFK Košice; Trenčín; Spartak Trnava
- Matches: 198
- Goals: 566 (2.86 per match)
- Top goalscorer: Tomáš Malec (14 goals)
- Biggest home win: Trenčín 6–0 D.Streda
- Biggest away win: Myjava 0–4 B.Bystrica
- Highest scoring: Myjava 6–2 Trnava; Žilina 4–4 Nitra
- Highest attendance: 7,009 (D.Streda – Sp.Trnava)
- Lowest attendance: 0 (Slovan – Senica, Slovan – Z.Moravce
- Average attendance: ▲2,164

The 2013–14 Slovak First Football League (known as the Slovak Corgoň Liga for sponsorship reasons) was the 21st season of first-tier football league in Slovakia, since its establishment in 1993. This season started on 12 July 2013 and ended on 31 May 2014.

ŠK Slovan Bratislava were the defending champions and successfully retained their league title.

== Teams ==
A total of 12 teams competed in the league, including 11 sides from the 2012–13 season and one promoted from the 2. liga.

Relegation for 1. FC Tatran Prešov to the 2013–14 Slovak Second Football League was confirmed on 26 May 2013. The one relegated team was replaced by FK DAC 1904 Dunajská Streda.

=== Stadiums and locations ===
Location of teams in Corgoň Liga 2013–14

Team	Home city	Stadium	Capacity	2012–13 season
AS Trenčín	Trenčín	Stadium na Sihoti	4,500	3rd in Corgoň Liga
DAC Dunajská Streda	Dunajská Streda	DAC Stadium	16,410	2. liga champions
Dukla Banská Bystrica	Banská Bystrica	SNP Stadium	10,000	9th in Corgoň Liga
FC Nitra	Nitra	Stadium pod Zoborom	11,384	10th in Corgoň Liga
FK Senica	Senica	Stadium FK Senica	4,500	Corgoň Liga runners-up
MFK Košice	Košice	Stadium Lokomotívy v Čermeli	9,000	5th in Corgoň Liga
MFK Ružomberok	Ružomberok	Stadium MFK Ružomberok	4,817	6th in Corgoň Liga
MŠK Žilina	Žilina	Stadium pod Dubňom	11,181	7th in Corgoň Liga
Slovan Bratislava	Bratislava	Pasienky	12,000	Corgoň Liga champions
Spartak Myjava	Myjava	Stadium Myjava	2,709	4th in Corgoň Liga
Spartak Trnava	Trnava	Stadium Antona Malatinského	3,350	11th in Corgoň Liga
ViOn Zlaté Moravce	Zlaté Moravce	FC ViOn Stadium	4,000	8th in Corgoň Liga

== Personnel and kits ==
Team	President	Manager	Captain	Kitmaker	Shirt sponsor
AS Trenčín	Tscheu La Ling	(Slovakia) Martin Ševela	Miloš Volešák	Nike	Aegon
DAC Dunajská Streda	Oszkár Világi	(Slovakia) Mikuláš Radványi	Peter Majerník	Adidas	TBA
Dukla Banská Bystrica	Tomáš Geist	(Slovakia) Norbert Hrnčár	Peter Boroš	Adidas	
FC Nitra	Eugen Árvay	(Slovakia) Ladislav Hudec	Cléber	Jako	Mesto Nitra
FK Senica	Viktor Blažek	(Czech Republic) Pavel Hapal	Juraj Piroska	hummel	
MFK Košice	Blažej Podolák	(Czech Republic) Radoslav Látal	Peter Šinglár	Nike	Steel Trans
MFK Ružomberok	Milan Fiľo	(Czech Republic) Jozef Chovanec	Tomáš Ďubek	Adidas	MAESTRO
MŠK Žilina	Jozef Antošík	(Slovakia) Adrián Guľa	Viktor Pečovský	Nike	Preto
Slovan Bratislava	Ivan Kmotrík	(Slovakia) Jozef Valovič	Igor Žofčák	Adidas	Niké
Spartak Myjava	Pavel Halabrín	(Slovakia) Radúz Dorňák	Martin Černáček	Uhlsport	NAD RESS
Spartak Trnava	Michal Pethö	(Slovakia) Juraj Jarábek	Roman Procházka	Adidas	Danube Wings.eu, ŽOS Trnava
ViOn Zlaté Moravce	Karol Škula	(Slovakia) Branislav Mráz	Martin Babic	Luanvi	ViOn

=== Managerial changes ===
Team	Outgoing manager	Manner of departure	Date of vacancy	Position in table	Replaced by	Date of appointment
FK Senica	Vladimír Koník	End of contract	27 May 2013	Pre-season	Eduard Pagáč	3 June 2013
FC ViOn Zlaté Moravce	Juraj Jarábek	Signed by Spartak Trnava	28 May 2013	Pre-season	Branislav Mráz	28 May 2013
FC Spartak Trnava	Vladimír Ekhardt	End of interim contract	28 May 2013	Pre-season	Juraj Jarábek	28 May 2013
AS Trenčín	Adrián Guľa	Signed by MŠK Žilina	30 June 2013	Pre-season	Ľubomír Nosický	4 June 2013
MŠK Žilina	Štefan Tarkovič	End of interim contract	30 June 2013	Pre-season	Adrián Guľa	1 July 2013
FC Nitra	Jozef Vukušič	End of contract	30 June 2013	Pre-season	Ladislav Šimčo	10 June 2013
MFK Ružomberok	Ladislav Šimčo	End of contract	30 June 2013	Pre-season	Jozef Vukušič	12 June 2013
MFK Košice	Ján Kozák	Signed by Slovakia	2 July 2013	Pre-season	Jaroslav Galko	2 July 2013
ŠK Slovan Bratislava	Samuel Slovák	Sacked	28 July 2013	9th	Jozef Valovič	28 July 2013
FC Nitra	Ladislav Šimčo	Sacked	27 August 2013	11th	Igor Demo	27 August 2013
AS Trenčín	Ľubomír Nosický	Sacked	30 August 2013	4th	Martin Ševela	30 August 2013
FC Nitra	Igor Demo	End of caretaker spell	10 September 2013	12th	Vladimír Koník	10 September 2013
MFK Košice	Jaroslav Galko	Sacked	18 September 2013	9th	Radoslav Látal	18 September 2013
Spartak Myjava	Ladislav Hudec	Mutual agreement	19 December 2013	5th	Radúz Dorňák	23 December 2013
FC Nitra	Vladimír Koník	Mutual agreement	7 January 2014	11th	Ladislav Hudec	19 February 2014
FK Senica	Eduard Pagáč	Sacked	12 March 2014	4th	Pavel Hapal	12 March 2014

Notes

1. Adrián Guľa was announced new MŠK Žilina manager for the 2013–14 season on 3 January 2013.

== League table ==
Pos	Team	Pld	W	D	L	GF	GA	GD	Pts	Qualification or relegation
1	Slovan Bratislava (C)	33	24	3	6	63	32	+31	75	Qualification for Champions League second qualifying round
2	Trenčín	33	19	6	8	74	35	+39	63	Qualification for Europa League second qualifying round
3	Spartak Trnava	33	16	5	12	47	42	+5	53	Qualification for Europa League first qualifying round
4	Ružomberok	33	15	5	13	56	51	+5	50	
5	Košice	33	13	7	13	41	40	+1	46	Qualification for Europa League second qualifying round (Note: 2013–14 Slovak Cup winners Košice qualified for the second qualifying round of the 2014–15 UEFA Europa League.)
6	Senica	33	13	7	13	45	47	−2	46	
7	Myjava	33	13	6	14	45	54	−9	45	
8	Dukla Banská Bystrica	33	11	9	13	48	48	0	42	
9	Žilina	33	11	7	15	49	50	−1	40	
10	ViOn Zlaté Moravce	33	11	5	17	36	47	−11	38	
11	DAC Dunajská Streda (Note: Dunajská Streda were deducted six points at the end of the season due to match-fixing.)	33	8	8	17	29	57	−28	26	
12	Nitra (R)	33	6	8	19	33	63	−30	26	Relegation to 2. liga West

Source: Niké liga (in Slovak)
Rules for classification: 1) points; 2) goal difference; 3) number of goals scored.
(C) Champions; (R) Relegated

== Results ==
Home \ Away	DAC	BB	KOŠ	NIT	RUŽ	SEN	SLO	MYJ	TRN	TRE	ZLM	ŽIL	DAC	BB	KOŠ	NIT	RUŽ	SEN	SLO	MYJ	TRN	TRE	ZLM	ŽIL
DAC Dunajská Streda		1–1	0–0	1–0	2–0	0–2	1–2	0–3	1–4	1–0	0–1	0–1		4–0		1–1					1–0		1–0	2–1
Dukla Banská Bystrica	5–1		1–0	4–0	0–1	3–1	2–4	1–0	0–0	2–2	2–1	3–3			0–1	0–0			1–2			2–2		4–1
Košice	4–1	3–1		4–2	2–2	3–1	0–1	2–1	1–3	0–1	2–0	1–0	2–1			1–0	1–2		0–2			1–1	0–0	
Nitra	0–0	2–0	2–3		3–3	1–0	1–2	0–1	0–1	1–1	2–3	0–2					3–1	2–0		3–0	3–0		0–3	
Ružomberok	2–0	2–1	0–3	4–0		1–1	2–3	0–3	3–2	1–2	1–3	2–2	2–1	0–1				0–0		5–0	0–2			3–2
Senica	4–0	1–1	1–0	2–1	2–1		0–2	3–1	2–1	3–1	2–1	2–1	3–3	1–1	3–2						0–1	2–1		1–4
Slovan Bratislava	1–1	2–0	1–1	5–0	3–2	1–0		5–0	2–0	0–3	2–0	2–1	2–1			2–1	1–2	2–0		0–1			2–0	
Myjava	4–1	0–4	1–0	4–0	0–3	2–2	2–2		6–2	1–3	2–2	1–1	1–1	2–1	0–1			2–0			0–3			
Spartak Trnava	1–2	2–1	0–0	0–0	1–4	1–0	1–3	0–1		2–1	3–2	1–0		4–0	1–0				1–2			3–1		3–1
Trenčín	6–0	3–1	5–0	4–0	0–1	2–0	4–2	2–3	2–2		5–0	2–1	3–0			1–1	3–0		0–1	4–1				
ViOn Zlaté Moravce	1–0	0–0	1–1	3–0	1–3	2–2	0–2	1–0	2–0	1–3		2–0		1–3			1–0	2–1		1–2	1–2	1–3		
Žilina	0–0	1–2	2–0	4–4	2–3	1–3	2–0	1–0	0–0	1–3	3–1				3–2	3–0			2–0	1–0		0–1	1–0	

Source: Niké liga (in Slovak)
Legend: Blue = home team win; Yellow = draw; Red = away team win.

== Season statistics ==
=== Top goalscorers ===
Updated through matches played on 31 May 2014

Rank	Player	Club	Goals
1	(Slovakia) Tomáš Malec	AS Trenčín	14
2	(Cameroon) Léandre Tawamba	MFK Ružomberok	13
2	(Slovakia) Juraj Piroska	FK Senica	13
4	(Czech Republic) Pavel Fořt	Slovan Bratislava	12
4	(Slovakia) Róbert Vittek	Slovan Bratislava	12
6	(Slovakia) Miloš Lačný	MFK Ružomberok	11
6	(Slovakia) Štefan Pekár	Spartak Myjava	11
6	(Slovakia) Pavol Jurčo	Banská Bystrica(8)/Žilina(3)	11
9	(Netherlands) Gino van Kessel	AS Trenčín	10
9	(Slovakia) Tomáš Ďubek	MFK Ružomberok	10
9	(Slovakia) Erik Sabo	Spartak Trnava	10

=== Hat-tricks ===
Round	Player	For	Against	Result	Date	Ref
1	(Nigeria) Fanendo Adi	AS Trenčín	FC Nitra	4–0	13 July 2013	
3	(Slovakia) Tomáš Malec	AS Trenčín	ŠK Slovan Bratislava	4–2	28 July 2013	
5	(Nigeria) Fanendo Adi	AS Trenčín	DAC Dunajská Streda	6–0	11 August 2013	
9	(Slovakia) Erik Pačinda	MFK Košice	DAC Dunajská Streda	4–1	14 September 2013	
15	(Slovakia) Miloš Lačný	MFK Ružomberok	FC Nitra	4–0	26 October 2013	
18	(Slovakia) Štefan Pekár	Spartak Myjava	DAC Dunajská Streda	3–0	23 November 2013	
31	(Slovakia) Adam Zreľák	MFK Ružomberok	Spartak Myjava	5–0	17 May 2014	

== Awards ==
=== Top Eleven ===
- Goalkeeper: (North Macedonia) Darko Tofiloski (MFK Košice)
- Defence: (Ivory Coast) Mamadou Bagayoko (ŠK Slovan), (Slovakia) Peter Kleščík (AS Trenčín), (Argentina) Nicolas Ezequiel Gorosito (Šk Slovan), (Serbia) Boris Sekulić (MFK Košice)
- Midfield: (Netherlands) Gino van Kessel (AS Trenčín), (Slovakia) Viktor Pečovský (MŠK Žilina), (Slovakia) Igor Žofčák (ŠK Slovan), (Serbia) Marko Milinković (ŠK Slovan)
- Attack: (Slovakia) Róbert Vittek (ŠK Slovan), (Slovakia) Juraj Piroska (FK Senica)

=== Individual awards ===
Manager of the season Jozef Valovič (ŠK Slovan) and Radoslav Látal (MFK Košice)

Player of the Year Róbert Vittek (ŠK Slovan)

Young player of the Year Martin Chrien (Dukla Banská Bystrica)

== Attendances ==
#	Club	Average
1	DAC	3,012
2	Trnava	2,951
3	Trenčín	2,894
4	Košice	2,480
5	Ružomberok	2,331
6	Senica	2,138
7	Myjava	2,050
8	Slovan	1,970
9	Dukla	1,938
10	Žilina	1,915
11	ViOn	1,531
12	Nitra	1,078

== See also ==
- 2013–14 Slovak Cup
- 2013–14 2. Liga (Slovakia)

=== Stats ===
- List of foreign players
- List of transfers summer 2013
- List of transfers winter 2013-14
