= Peter Kumančík =

Slovak footballer

Personal information
- Full name: Peter Kumančík
- Date of birth: 21 July 1985 (age 41)
- Place of birth: Czechoslovakia
- Position: Left back

Youth career
- ?–2003: Senica
- 2000–2003: → MFK Myjava-Turá Lúka (loan)

Senior career*
Years	Team	Apps	(Gls)
2003–2014	Myjava	18	(0)
2012	→ Vrbové (loan)	14	(0)
2014–2025	TJ Družstevník Hlboké		
2025–	TJ Ilanovo		
- * Club domestic league appearances and goals as of 24 August 2014

Peter Kumančík (born 21 July 1985) is a Slovak football defender who is most known for playing with Fortuna Liga club Spartak Myjava.

Coming through the Myjava academy, Kumančík would make his debut for the club in March 2013, playing the rest of the fixtures of the year. He would play a total of 18 league games for Spartak Myjava, retiring from professional football due to injury problems. After leaving Myjava, Kumančík joined village amateur side TJ Družstevník Hlboké, where he would captain the club to promotion to the 4. Liga in 2025.

== Club career ==
=== Spartak Myjava ===
After his half-season loan with Vrbové, Kumančík would return to play with Spartak Myjava. He made his professional debut for the Spartak Myjava senior side on 2 March 2013 in the Corgoň Liga match against AS Trenčín, playing the full 90 minutes of a 1–0 loss. His next game would be in a 2–1 win over FC VSS Košice, being a part of the build up for the winning goal scored by Peter Kuračka in the 80th minute. In the nine game that Kumančík would play in that season, Myjava would only lose twice, both times against AS Trenčín. He would play the full match in a historic 1–0 win against ŠK Slovan Bratislava away from home. In 2014, Kumančík decide to end his professional career due to recurring health problems with his knees.

=== TJ Družstevník Hlboké ===
In 2014, Kumančík joined amateur side TJ Družstevník Hlboké, where he eventually became the player-manager of the club. He scored the winning goal in a 1–0 win against the eventual league winners Spartak Šaštín. In 2025, the season the club got promoted, he played the most minutes in the whole league, not missing a single game.
