= Ladislav Hudec =

Ladislav Hudec may refer to:

- László Hudec (1893–1958), Hungarian-Slovak architect
- Ladislav Hudec (footballer) (born 1957), Slovak former footballer and current manager
