= Peter Sládek =

Slovak footballer

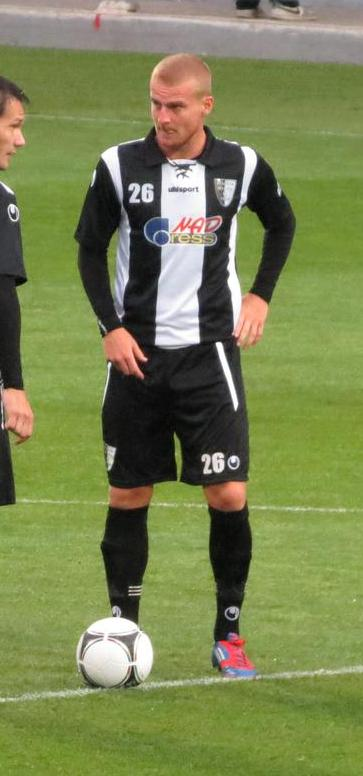

Personal information
- Full name: Peter Sládek
- Date of birth: 7 July 1989 (age 37)
- Place of birth: Myjava, Czechoslovakia
- Height: 1.83 m (6 ft 0 in)
- Positions: Forward; winger

Team information
- Current team: SCU Euratsfeld

Youth career
- Spartak Myjava
- 2004–2006: Púchov
- 2006–2008: Slovácko

Senior career*
| Years | Team | Apps | (Gls) |
| 2008–2010 | Slovácko | 0 | (0) |
| 2009–2010 | → Vítkovice (loan) | 22 | (5) |
| 2010–2016 | Spartak Myjava | 163 | (62) |
| 2013–2014 | → Oostende (loan) | 8 | (0) |
| 2015 | → Spartak Trnava (loan) | 12 | (1) |
| 2017–2018 | Podbeskidzie Bielsko-Biała | 8 | (0) |
| 2017 | → Zlaté Moravce (loan) | 16 | (1) |
| 2019–2020 | Lipany | 13 | (3) |
| 2019–2020 | → Častkovce (loan) | | |
| 2020–2024 | Častkovce | | |
| 2024– | SCU Euratsfeld | | |
- * Club domestic league appearances and goals as of 7 July 2024

Peter Sládek (born 7 July 1989) is a Slovak footballer who plays for Austrian club SCU Euratsfeld as a forward or winger.

== Club career ==
He made his league debut for Spartak Myjava against Žilina on 13 July 2012.

Sládek was originally presented as a late new signing of newly promoted Oostende at the end of the summer 2013 transfer window, but the transfer was cancelled a few days later as an administrative error has caused the transfer to be ruled invalid by the FIFA. Two months later, near the end of October, FIFA finally allowed the transfer to go through.
