= Tomáš Bruško =

Slovak footballer (born 1983)

Personal information
- Full name: Tomáš Bruško
- Date of birth: 21 February 1983 (age 43)
- Place of birth: Myjava, Czechoslovakia
- Height: 1.86 m (6 ft 1 in)
- Position: Midfielder

Senior career*
Years	Team	Apps	(Gls)
–2001	Dubnica		
2001–2005	Dynamo Kyiv	0	(0)
2001–2005	→ Dynamo-2 Kyiv	34	(1)
2001–2005	→ Dynamo-3 Kyiv	3	(2)
2003	→ Vorskla Poltava (loan)	4	(0)
2003–2005	→ Slovan Bratislava (loan)		
2004	→ Union Berlin (loan)	11	(1)
2005–2008	MFK Dubnica		
2008–2010	Banská Bystrica	?	(?)
2010–2011	Dubnica	44	(3)
2011–2014	Spartak Myjava	56	(3)
- * Club domestic league appearances and goals

Tomáš Bruško (born 21 February 1983) is a Slovak former professional footballer who played as a midfielder.

It was announced that Tomáš would play for Leeds United against MFK Ruzomberok in a pre-season friendly match with the Yorkshire club exploring the possibility of signing the midfielder.

== Honours ==
=== Slovakia ===
Slovakia U20

- 2003 FIFA U-20 World Cup: Participation

Slovakia U19

- 2002 UEFA European Under-19 Football Championship - Third place
