= Pavol Kosík =

Slovak footballer

Personal information
- Full name: Pavol Kosík
- Date of birth: 2 July 1980 (age 46)
- Place of birth: Myjava, Czechoslovakia
- Height: 1.84 m (6 ft 0 in)
- Position: Forward

Youth career
- Myjava

Senior career*
Years	Team	Apps	(Gls)
?–2001	Myjava		
2001–2002	Žilina	32	(2)
2002–2004	Senica		
2004	MFK Myjava-Turá Lúka		
2005–2008	Žilina	0	(0)
2008–2014	Myjava		
- * Club domestic league appearances and goals as of 3 September 2012

Pavol Kosík (born 2 July 1980) is a Slovak former football striker.
