= Miroslav Duga =

Slovak footballer

Personal information
- Full name: Miroslav Duga
- Date of birth: 29 January 1989 (age 37)
- Place of birth: Myjava, Czechoslovakia
- Height: 1.82 m (5 ft 11 1/2 in)
- Position: Left back

Team information
- Current team: TJ Spartak Myjava
- Number: 9

Senior career*
Years	Team	Apps	(Gls)
2009–2010	Dubnica	33	(0)
2010–	Myjava	43	(0)
- * Club domestic league appearances and goals as of 3 June 2013

Miroslav Duga (29 January 1989 in Myjava) is a Slovak footballer who plays as a defender for the Corgoň Liga club TJ Spartak Myjava.
