= Ondrej Neoveský =

Slovak footballer

Personal information
- Full name: Ondrej Neoveský
- Date of birth: 10 September 1986 (age 40)
- Place of birth: Czechoslovakia
- Height: 1.89 m (6 ft 2 in)
- Positions: Midfielder; defender

Team information
- Current team: Nafta Gbely
- Number: 11

Youth career
- Myjava

Senior career*
| Years | Team | Apps | (Gls) |
- Myjava
| ?–2008 | Petržalka B | | |
| 2008–2010 | Petržalka | 1 | (0) |
| 2009–2013 | Senec | 28 | (2) |
| 2011–2014 | Myjava | 24 | (2) |
| 2013 | → Senec (loan) | 9 | (0) |
| 2014–2018 | Skalica | 70 | (6) |
| 2018–2020 | ASV Hohenau | 6 | (0) |
| 2020– | Nafta Gbely | | |
- * Club domestic league appearances and goals as of 16:52, 25 April 2024 (UTC)

Ondrej Neoveský (born 10 September 1986) is a Slovak football midfielder who currently plays for the Fortuna Liga club MFK Skalica.

== Career ==
He made his Corgoň Liga debut for Artmedia Petržalka against MŠK Žilina on 26 October 2008.
