= Denis Duga =

Slovak footballer (born 1994)

Personal information
- Date of birth: 5 September 1994 (age 32)
- Place of birth: Myjava, Slovakia
- Height: 1.76 m (5 ft 9 in)
- Position: Midfielder

Team information
- Current team: ViOn Zlaté Moravce
- Number: 14

Youth career
- –2008: Spartak Myjava
- 2008–2013: Slavia Prague

Senior career*
Years	Team	Apps	(Gls)
2013–2014	Slavia Prague jun.		
2014	→ Spartak Myjava (loan)	13	(1)
2014–2016	Spartak Myjava	61	(9)
2017	Sellier & Bellot Vlašim	3	(0)
2017	Senica	14	(1)
2018–	ViOn Zlaté Moravce	181	(7)

International career^{‡}
2015–2016	Slovakia U21	1	(0)
- * Club domestic league appearances and goals as of 25 May 2026 ‡ National team caps and goals as of 15 June 2015

Denis Duga (born 5 September 1994) is a Slovak professional footballer who currently plays for Slovak club ViOn Zlaté Moravce in the 2. Liga. He currently captains the side.

== Club career ==
=== FK Senica ===
In August 2017, it was announced that Duga would be returning to Slovakia to join First Football League club FK Senica. He was considered the most experienced player in the squad at the age of only 22.

He made his debut for Senica in a 1–0 home defeat in the league against FC Nitra. Duga's first contribution came in a 3–1 loss against Spartak Trnava, assisting a goal scored by Jurij Medveděv in the 70th minute. Duga scored his first goal for the club in a 2–2 draw against ŠK Slovan Bratislava, scoring in the 46th minute to make the score 2–1 in favor of the opponents. Four minutes after half time, Oliver Podhorín would score the equalizing goal for Senica.

=== Zlaté Moravce ===
In 2018, Duga joined fellow league outfit side FC ViOn Zlaté Moravce. He made his first division debut for ViOn in a 1–0 away victory against his former club, FK Senica. Duga scored his first goal for the club 2 seasons after his debut, scoring in the 21st minute of the game in a 2–1 loss against FC DAC 1904 Dunajská Streda. He experienced relegation with the club in the 2023–24 season. He signed an extension to his contract with ViOn in 2024 alongside several other players.

== International career ==
Duga once played for the Slovakia national under-21 football team under coach Pavel Hapal while playing for Slavia Prague in the youth category.
