= Matej Siva =

Slovak footballer

Personal information
- Full name: Matej Siva
- Date of birth: 10 October 1984 (age 42)
- Place of birth: Martin, Czechoslovakia
- Height: 1.84 m (6 ft 0 in)
- Position: Right back

Team information
- Current team: TJ Iskra Borčice
- Number: 17

Youth career
- 1995–2001: Martin
- 2001–2003: ŠKF ZŤS VTJ Martin

Senior career*
Years	Team	Apps	(Gls)
2003–2005	OFK Veľký Lapáš		
2005–2009	Ružomberok	111	(6)
2010–2012	Teplice	51	(3)
2012–2014	Myjava	55	(4)
2014	Spartak Trnava	12	(0)
2015–	Borčice		
- * Club domestic league appearances and goals as of 11 June 2015

Matej Siva (born 10 October 1984) is a Slovak football defender who currently plays for TJ Iskra Borčice.

== Club career ==
Siva was transferred to Spartak Trnava in June 2014. He made his league debut for them against Dunajská Streda on 20 July 2014.
