= Tomáš Marček =

Slovak footballer

Personal information
- Full name: Tomáš Marček
- Date of birth: 10 March 1987 (age 39)
- Place of birth: Trenčín, Czechoslovakia
- Height: 1.85 m (6 ft 1 in)
- Position: Midfielder

Youth career
- Trenčín

Senior career*
Years	Team	Apps	(Gls)
2007–2009	Trenčín	36	(1)
2009–2012	→ Nové Mesto nad Váhom (loan)		
2012–2016	Spartak Myjava	137	(4)

International career^{‡}
- Slovakia U20
- * Club domestic league appearances and goals as of 21 December 2016 ‡ National team caps and goals as of 31 May 2012

Tomáš Marček (born 10 March 1987) is a Slovak retired football midfielder who last played for the Slovak Corgoň Liga club Spartak Myjava.
