= Ľubomír Urgela =

Slovak footballer

Personal information
- Full name: Ľubomír Urgela
- Date of birth: 29 January 1990 (age 36)
- Place of birth: Žiar nad Hronom, Czechoslovakia
- Height: 1.92 m (6 ft 4 in)
- Position: Forward

Team information
- Current team: Sitno Banská Štiavnica
- Number: 7

Youth career
- Žiar nad Hronom

Senior career*
Years	Team	Apps	(Gls)
2009–2011	Dubnica	2	(0)
2011	→ Rimavská Sobota (loan)		
2012	Piešťany		
2012–2014	Spartak Myjava	34	(7)
2014–2016	Karviná	54	(17)
2016–2017	→ Baník Ostrava (loan)	23	(4)
2017–2018	ViOn Zlaté Moravce	48	(6)
2019–2020	SC/ESV Parndorf	37	(13)
2021–	Sitno Banská Štiavnica		
- * Club domestic league appearances and goals

Ľubomír Urgela (born 29 January 1990) is a Slovak footballer who plays as a striker for FK Sitno Banská Štiavnica.

== Career ==
After about two years in Austria with SC/ESV Parndorf, Urgela returned to Slovakia in May 2021 to join FK Sitno Banská Štiavnica.
