= Lukáš Pellegrini =

Slovak footballer and regional politician

Personal information
- Full name: Lukáš Pellegrini
- Date of birth: 10 May 1988 (age 38)
- Place of birth: Žiar nad Hronom, Czechoslovakia
- Height: 1.81 m (5 ft 11 1/2 in)
- Position: Central midfielder

Team information
- Current team: Sokol Repište
- Number: 7

Youth career
- Sokol Repište
- Nitra

Senior career*
Years	Team	Apps	(Gls)
2007–2012	ViOn Zlaté Moravce	18	(0)
2008–2009	→ Žiar nad Hronom (loan)		
2009	→ Lokomotíva Zvolen (loan)		
2009	→ LAFC Lučenec (loan)		
2009–2011	→ Lokomotíva Zvolen (loan)		
2011–2012	→ Šamorín (loan)		
2012–2013	Šamorín	15	(1)
2013	→ Spartak Myjava (loan)	25	(2)
2014–2020	Pohronie	157	(17)
2020–2024	Sitno Banská Štiavnica	65	(21)
2024–	Sokol Repište	7	(7)

Managerial career
- 2021: Sitno Banská Štiavnica (player-coach)
- * Club domestic league appearances and goals as of 11:19, 13 March 2025 (UTC)

Lukáš Pellegrini (born 10 May 1988) is a former Slovak professional football midfielder who currently plays for amateur side TJ Sokol Repište. Pellegrini is also active as a regional politician.

== Club career ==
Pellegrini made his debut in the Corgoň Liga, when he played for ViOn Zlaté Moravce. He also he played UEFA Cup qualifying matches against Almaty and Russian giant Zenit St. Petersburg. In January 2013, he came to transferred to Spartak Myjava.

== Political activities ==
Pellegrini served as a professional firefighter in later years of his football career. In 2022, Pellegrini successfully ran as a candidate for a post of a deputy in Regional Parliament of Banská Bystrica Region as well as the City Council of Banská Štiavnica.

In 2023 parliamentary elections, he ran on Hlas–SD party list, led by his cousin, former Prime Minister and current President Peter Pellegrini. In the election, Hlas won the third place with 14.7% of votes. Pellegrini, who was placed 150th on the party list, received 7,639 preferential candidate votes, failing to win an election and being ranked as the first alternate to the parliament.

In early 2025, Pellegrini replaced MP Roman Malatinec as the Regional Chairman of Hlas-SD for his native Banská Bystrica Region.
