= Roman Častulín =

Slovak footballer

Personal information
- Full name: Roman Častulín
- Date of birth: 3 April 1985 (age 41)
- Place of birth: Trenčín, Czechoslovakia
- Height: 1.88 m (6 ft 2 in)
- Position: Centre back

Team information
- Current team: FK Dubnica
- Number: 19

Youth career
- TTS Trenčín
- Trenčín

Senior career*
Years	Team	Apps	(Gls)
2003–2004	Trenčín		
2004–2005	TTS Trenčín		
2004–2005	→ Nemšová (loan)		
2005–2011	Nemšová		
2005	→ TTS Trenčín (loan)		
2011–2015	Myjava	108	(5)
2015–2017	Nová Dubnica		
2016	→ Spartak Trnava II (loan)		
2017	→ Dubnica (loan)	5	(0)
2017–	Dubnica	17	(0)
- * Club domestic league appearances and goals as of 25 February 2018

Roman Častulín (born 3 April 1985) is a Slovak footballer who plays as a centre back for FK Dubnica.

== Spartak Myjava ==
He made his Corgoň Liga debut for Spartak Myjava against MŠK Žilina on 13 July 2012. He also scored the first Spartak Myjava Corgoň Liga goal in the 87th minute of the match, which ended in a 1–4 loss against MŠK Žilina.
