= Milan Ferenčík =

Slovak footballer (born 1991)

Personal information
- Date of birth: 13 February 1991 (age 35)
- Place of birth: Senica, Czechoslovakia
- Height: 1.78 m (5 ft 10 in)
- Position: Forward

Team information
- Current team: Jednota Brestovec

Youth career
- Senica
- Myjava
- Nitra
- Spartak Trnava
- Baník Ostrava

Senior career*
Years	Team	Apps	(Gls)
2011–2013	Baník Ostrava	16	(2)
2012–2013	Baník Ostrava B	10	(4)
2012–2013	→ Banská Bystrica (loan)	14	(3)
2013	Myjava	9	(2)
2014	Senica	5	(0)
2015	BFC Viktoria 1889		
2015	Atzenbrugg/H.		
2016	Karlstetten/Neidling		
2017	ASK Loosdorf	8	(5)
2018	USC Fenster		
2018	Ober-Grafendorf		
2019	Kienberg/Gaming		
2019–2021	St. Veit an der Gölsen		
2022	Krummnussbaum		
2023–	Jednota Brestovec		

International career
2010–2011	Slovakia U-19	1	(0)
2011–2012	Slovakia U-21	1	(0)
- * Club domestic league appearances and goals as of 25 August 2016

Milan Ferenčík (born 13 February 1991) is a Slovak football forward who currently plays for Jednota Brestovec. He made his debut for FC Baník Ostrava against FC Hradec Králové on 10 April 2011.
