= Ivan Šnirc =

Slovak footballer

Personal information
- Full name: Ivan Šnirc
- Date of birth: 11 June 1993 (age 33)
- Place of birth: Banská Bystrica, Slovakia
- Height: 1.79 m (5 ft 10 in)
- Position: Left back

Youth career
- –2013: Dukla Banská Bystrica

Senior career*
Years	Team	Apps	(Gls)
2013–	Dukla Banská Bystrica	0	(0)
2013	→ Kremnička (loan)		
2014–2015	→ Dunajská Streda	8	(0)
2015–2018	→ Ústí nad Labem	62	(3)
2023	Sokol Hostoun B		
2025–	Nucice		
- * Club domestic league appearances and goals as of 31 December 2025

Ivan Šnirc (born 11 June 1993) is a Slovak football player who plays as a left back.

== Club career ==
Šnirc started his career at FK Dukla Banská Bystrica, where he mainly played for the B team.

=== Dunajská Streda ===
Šnirc joined fellow league outfit FC DAC 1904 Dunajská Streda in the winter of 2014. He made his professional debut for FK DAC Dunajská Streda against FC Spartak Trnava on 8 March 2014, playing the full match in a 2–1 win for his team. Since then, he had appeared in the starting lineup twice more and also came on twice at the end, for a few minutes. He spent most of the year on the bench, from where he observed the reliable performances of Otti Szabó. In 2015, Šnirc left Dunajská Streda after being unable to fight his way into the A team.

=== Ústí nad Labem ===
In 2015, Šnirc joined FK Ústí nad Labem on a trial after leaving Slovakia. Later that year, it was announced that Šnirc would be transferring to Czech club FK Viagem Ústí nad Labem alongside Samir Nurković and Egejuru Godslove Ukwuoma. Šnirc played in a 3–0 win against 1. SK Prostějov, which helped secure his club’s historic seventh win in a row. He featured in a 1–0 league loss against SFC Opava.
