= Matej Székely =

Slovak footballer

Personal information
- Full name: Matej Székely
- Date of birth: 12 May 1991 (age 35)
- Place of birth: Trnava, Czechoslovakia
- Position: Goalkeeper

Team information
- Current team: Piešťany

Youth career
- Inter Bratislava
- Lokomotíva Trnava
- Spartak Trnava

Senior career*
Years	Team	Apps	(Gls)
2010–2012	Spartak Trnava	0	(0)
2012	→ Moravany nad Váhom (loan)		
2012–2013	Myjava	1	(0)
2014–	Piešťany	0	(0)
- * Club domestic league appearances and goals as of 1 January 2014

Matej Székely (born 12 May 1991) is a Slovak football goalkeeper who plays for Piešťany.

== Club career ==
He made his league debut on 26 May 2013 against Ružomberok.
