= Marek Jastráb =

Slovak footballer and model

Personal information
- Date of birth: 16 July 1993 (age 33)
- Place of birth: Slovakia
- Height: 1.87 m (6 ft 2 in)
- Position: Midfielder

Team information
- Current team: SC Zöbern
- Number: 9

Youth career
- Myjava

Senior career*
Years	Team	Apps	(Gls)
2011–	Myjava	17	(0)
2014	→ Dubnica (loan)	12	(1)
2015–2017	→ Nové Mesto nad Váhom (loan)	43	(3)
2019-2024	SC Zöbern		
2024-	Myjava		
- * Club domestic league appearances and goals as of 21 December 2016

Marek Jastráb (born 16 July 1993) is a Slovak football midfielder who currently plays for the club SC Zöbern.

== Club career ==
He began his football career at Spartak Myjava, where he went through all youth categories. In 2011, he worked his way up to the first team. He advanced to the top flight with the team in the 2011/12 season. He made his Corgoň Liga debut for Spartak Myjava against FC Spartak Trnava on 27 October 2012. During the spring part of the 2013/14 season, he went on loan to MFK Dubnica, where he played for half a year. In the summer of 2015, he went on loan to AFC Nové Mesto nad Váhom. He joined SC Zöbern in the Austrian division, before leaving 5 years later to return to Spartak Myjava. He tied as top goal scorer alongside Denis Alijagić and Martin Janík in the 2024–25 Slovak Cup, scoring 5 goals. In 2025, Jastráb left Myjava for SC Zöbern.

== Personal life ==
Jastráb is also a professional model. In 2020, he won the Mister Slovensko award.
