= Tomáš Belic =

Slovak footballer (born 1978)

Personal information
- Full name: Tomáš Belic
- Date of birth: 2 July 1978 (age 48)
- Place of birth: Trenčín, Czechoslovakia
- Height: 1.91 m (6 ft 3 in)
- Position: Goalkeeper

Team information
- Current team: Trenčín (goalkeeper coach)

Youth career
- 1988–1996: Trenčín

Senior career*
Years	Team	Apps	(Gls)
1996–1997	ZTS Dubnica		
1997	Žilina	1	(0)
1998	Dukla Trenčín		
1998–1999	VTJ Štúrovo		
1999–2000	Nové Zámky		
2000–2002	Spartak Trnava	24	(0)
2003–2006	Brno	43	(0)
2005	→ Dynamo České Budějovice (loan)	8	(0)
2006	→ FC Vítkovice (loan)	4	(0)
2006	→ Trenčín (loan)	16	(0)
2007–2008	Teplice	22	(0)
2009–2010	Panionios FC	27	(0)
2011	Púchov	10	(0)
2011–2013	Dukla Banská Bystrica	31	(0)
2013	DAC Dunajská Streda	12	(0)
2014	Spartak Myjava	5	(0)
2015–????	Nové Mesto nad Váhom	?	(?)
- * Club domestic league appearances and goals as of 18 June 2018

Tomáš Belic (born 2 July 1978) is a Slovak footballer who plays for AFC Nové Mesto nad Váhom. His former club was Spartak Myjava in the Fortuna Liga.

== Club career ==
Belic previously played for Panionios F.C., 1. FC Brno and FK Teplice in the Czech Gambrinus liga. He has also played for FC Spartak Trnava and FK AS Trenčín in the Slovak Superliga.

He signed a two-and-one-half-year contract with Panionios on 22 December 2008.

== Coaching career ==
Belic started as a youth goalkeeper coach at Trenčín. He was promoted to the first team goalkeeper coach in July 2018 under manager Ricardo Moniz.
