= Vladimír Kukoľ =

Slovak footballer

Personal information
- Full name: Vladimír Kukoľ
- Date of birth: 8 May 1986 (age 40)
- Place of birth: Levoča, Czechoslovakia
- Height: 1.72 m (5 ft 8 in)
- Position: Midfielder

Team information
- Current team: Podkonice

Senior career*
Years	Team	Apps	(Gls)
- Spišská Nová Ves
2004–2007	Spišské Podhradie		
2007–2010	Ružomberok	45	(2)
2010–2011	Sandecja Nowy Sącz	30	(9)
2011	Jagiellonia Białystok	8	(0)
2012	Zawisza Bydgoszcz	12	(0)
2012–2014	Myjava	42	(3)
2014–2016	Vysočina Jihlava	59	(3)
2016	Spartak Myjava	19	(2)
2017–2020	Poprad	71	(15)
2020–2023	Železiarne Podbrezová	76	(3)
2023–	Podkonice		
- * Club domestic league appearances and goals as of 8 May 2024

Vladimír Kukoľ (born 8 May 1986) is a Slovak professional footballer who plays as a midfielder for Podkonice.

== Career ==
=== Club ===
In June 2011, he joined Jagiellonia Białystok on a one-year contract.
