= Miroslav Sedlák =

Slovak footballer

Personal information
- Full name: Miroslav Sedlák
- Date of birth: 12 March 1993 (age 33)
- Place of birth: Senica, Slovakia
- Height: 1.78 m (5 ft 10 in)
- Positions: Left back; winger

Team information
- Current team: Spartak Trnava

Youth career
- Spartak Trnava
- Senica

Senior career*
Years	Team	Apps	(Gls)
2011–2015	Senica	0	(0)
2011–2012	→ Vrbové (loan)		
2012–2013	→ Šamorín (loan)	10	(1)
2013	→ Dunajská Streda (loan)	27	(0)
2014	→ Palárikovo (loan)		
2014–2015	→ Gabčíkovo (loan)		
2015–2016	Šaľa	32	(3)
2016	Zlaté Moravce	10	(1)

International career
2010–2011	Slovakia U18		
- * Club domestic league appearances and goals as of 1 January 2017

Miroslav Sedlák (born 12 March 1993) is a Slovak footballer who plays for Spartak Trnava as a left back or winger.

== FK DAC 1904 Dunajská Streda ==
He made his professional debut for FK DAC 1904 Dunajská Streda against ŠK Slovan Bratislava on 12 July 2013.
