= Peter Kuračka =

Slovak footballer

Personal information
- Full name: Peter Kuračka
- Date of birth: 13 July 1978 (age 48)
- Place of birth: Myjava, Czechoslovakia
- Height: 1.75 m (5 ft 9 in)
- Position: Midfielder

Youth career
- Spartak Myjava
- Slovan Bratislava

Senior career*
Years	Team	Apps	(Gls)
- Bradlan Brezová
- Spartak Myjava
2003–2006	Prachatice	50	(9)
2007–2011	Zlaté Moravce	130	(26)
2012–2014	Spartak Trnava	16	(0)
2012–2013	→ Spartak Myjava (loan)	43	(7)
2014–	Veľký Meder	0	(0)
- * Club domestic league appearances and goals as of 8 January 2016

Peter Kuračka (born 13 July 1978) is a Slovak football midfielder.

He came to Trnava in January 2012 and made his debut for them against Zlaté Moravce on 3 March 2012.
