= Roland Šmahajčík =

Slovak footballer

Personal information
- Full name: Roland Šmahajčík
- Date of birth: 17 May 1993 (age 33)
- Place of birth: Turzovka, Slovakia
- Position: Forward

Team information
- Current team: FK Tatran Turzovka

Youth career
- FK Tatran Turzovka
- 2008–2011: Dubnica

Senior career*
Years	Team	Apps	(Gls)
2012–2014	Dubnica	42	(14)
2014	Spartak Myjava	5	(0)
2014	→ Dubnica (loan)	15	(4)
2015	→ Senec (loan)	9	(0)
2016	SC Herzogenburg		
2017–	FK Tatran Turzovka		
- * Club domestic league appearances and goals as of 1 September 2018

Roland Šmahajčík (born 17 May 1993) is a Slovak football forward who plays for FK Tatran Turzovka.

== Club career ==
=== Spartak Myjava ===
He made his professional debut for Spartak Myjava against FK Senica on 19 April 2014.
