= Jozef Valovič =

Slovak football manager

Jozef Valovič (born 9 April 1952) is a Slovak football manager.

He coached Slovan Bratislava, FC DAC FC Nitra and Senec.
