= Štefan Pekár =

Slovak footballer (born 1988)

Personal information
- Full name: Štefan Pekár
- Date of birth: 3 December 1988 (age 37)
- Place of birth: Bojnice, Czechoslovakia
- Height: 1.84 m (6 ft 0 in)
- Positions: Winger; second striker

Team information
- Current team: Pohronie
- Number: 9

Youth career
- 1994–1998: FK Junior Kanianka
- 1999–2008: Prievidza

Senior career*
| Years | Team | Apps | (Gls) |
| 2009 | Mladá Boleslav | | |
| 2009 | Prievidza | | |
| 2010–2013 | Ružomberok | 73 | (5) |
| 2013–2016 | Spartak Myjava | 103 | (28) |
| 2017 | Baník Ostrava | 8 | (2) |
| 2017–2019 | Spartak Trnava | 27 | (1) |
| 2019–2023 | Spartak Myjava | ? | (58) |
| 2023–2024 | Pohronie | 26 | (5) |
- * Club domestic league appearances and goals as of 22 June 2024

Štefan Pekár (born 3 December 1988) is a Slovak footballer who currently plays for FK Pohronie in 2. Liga as a winger or second striker.

== Club career ==
He was signed by Spartak Trnava in July 2017.

== Honours ==
Spartak Trnava

- Slovak Super Liga: 2017–18
- Slovak Cup: 2018–19
