= Radúz Dorňák =

Slovak footballer and manager

Personal information
- Full name: Radúz Dorňák
- Date of birth: 1 March 1956 (age 70)
- Place of birth: Czechoslovakia

Managerial career
- Years: Team
- FK TTS Trenčín
- Nemšová
- Slovan Bratislava
- 2005–2006: Trenčín
- Trenčín "youths"
- Myjava "youths"
- 2014: Myjava

Radúz Dorňák (born 1 March 1956) is a Slovak former football player. He is most known for managing First League club Spartak Myjava. He also managed AS Trenčín.

== Managerial career ==
In 2007, Dorňák was the manager of AS Trenčín. In 2010 he was in-charge of the youth sections.

=== Spartak Myjava ===
On 23 December 2013, Dorňák was selected to become the new head coach of Spartak Myjava, replacing Ladislav Hudec. His first match in-charge would be a 1–0 loss against his former club Trenčín. In the next match, Dorňák got his first win, beating FC VSS Košice 2–1. He helped the club finish in 4th, a place higher before he became manager.
