= Stadium Myjava =

Football stadium in Myjava, Slovakia

- Interactive map of Stadium Myjava
- Location: Hodžova 261/1, Myjava, Slovakia
- Coordinates: 48°45′40.1″N 17°33′55.7″E
- Operator: Spartak Myjava
- Capacity: 2,709 (all seats)
- Surface: Grass
- Field size: 105 x 68 m

Construction
- Opened: 1954
- Renovated: 2012–2013

Tenants
- Spartak Myjava; Slovakia U21; AS Trenčín (2017-)

Website
- www.spartakmyjava.sk

Football Stadium Myjava (Slovak: Futbalový štadión Myjava) is a football stadium in Myjava, Slovakia. It serves as home stadium for football club Spartak Myjava. The stadium has a capacity of 2,709 (all seats). The intensity of the floodlighting is 1,100 lux. The stadium was renovated in 2012–13.
