= Peter Solnička =

Slovak footballer

Personal information
- Full name: Peter Solnička
- Date of birth: 14 June 1982 (age 44)
- Place of birth: Czechoslovakia
- Height: 1.84 m (6 ft 0 in)
- Position: Goalkeeper

Team information
- Current team: Spartak Myjava
- Number: 1

Senior career*
Years	Team	Apps	(Gls)
2012–	Spartak Myjava	95	(0)
- * Club domestic league appearances and goals as of 21 December 2016

Peter Solnička (born 14 June 1982) is a Slovak professional footballer who currently plays for the Corgoň Liga club Spartak Myjava.

== Spartak Myjava ==
He made his Corgoň Liga debut for Spartak Myjava against MŠK Žilina on 13 July 2012.
