= Martin Černáček =

Slovak footballer

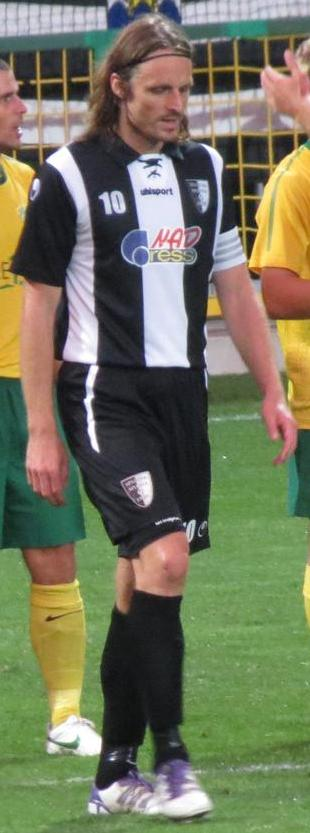

Personal information
- Full name: Martin Černáček
- Date of birth: 9 November 1979 (age 47)
- Place of birth: Trnava, Czechoslovakia
- Height: 1.86 m (6 ft 1 in)
- Position: Centre back

Team information
- Current team: FC Neded

Youth career
- Spartak Myjava

Senior career*
Years	Team	Apps	(Gls)
1998–2002	Spartak Trnava	1	(0)
2000–01	→ ŠK Blava (loan)		
2002–04	FC Neded		
2004–05	SK Tatran Poštorná		
2004–06	ASV Asparn		
2007–2016	Spartak Myjava	127	(13)
2017–	Neded		
- * Club domestic league appearances and goals as of 24 January 2017

Martin Černáček (born 9 November 1979) is a Slovak football defender who currently plays for FC Neded.

Černáček, a native of Myjava and long-time captain of Spartak Myjava, successfully helped the club advance from the fourth league to the top flight.

== Club career ==
=== Early career ===
Černáček began his football career at TJ Spartak Myjava. In 1998, he transferred to FC Spartak Trnava. Before the 2000/01 season, he went on loan to ŠK Jaslovské Bohunice, from where he returned to Trnava a year later. In March 2002, he left the club and signed a contract with FC Neded. Two foreign engagements followed. First, he played for the Czech team SK Tatran Poštorná and then wore the jersey of the Austrian ASV Asparn.

=== Spartak Myjava ===
In the winter transfer period of the 2006/07 season, he returned to Myjava. With the team, he advanced to the third league in the 2008/09 season, two years later to the second highest competition and in the spring of 2012 he was a part of the Myjava squad that got promoted to the top flight. It was also at the time were he became the captain of the team.

Černáček made his First Football League debut for Spartak Myjava against MŠK Žilina on 13 July 2012, playing the whole match in a 4–1 defeat. His first goal of the season came in a 1–0 away win against FK Senica, securing the win for Myjava in the 78th minute.

He ended his professional career on December 10, 2016, in the last round of the 2016/17 Fortuna League season after the 1–1 draw against ŠK Slovan Bratislava.
