= Matúš Turňa =

Slovak footballer

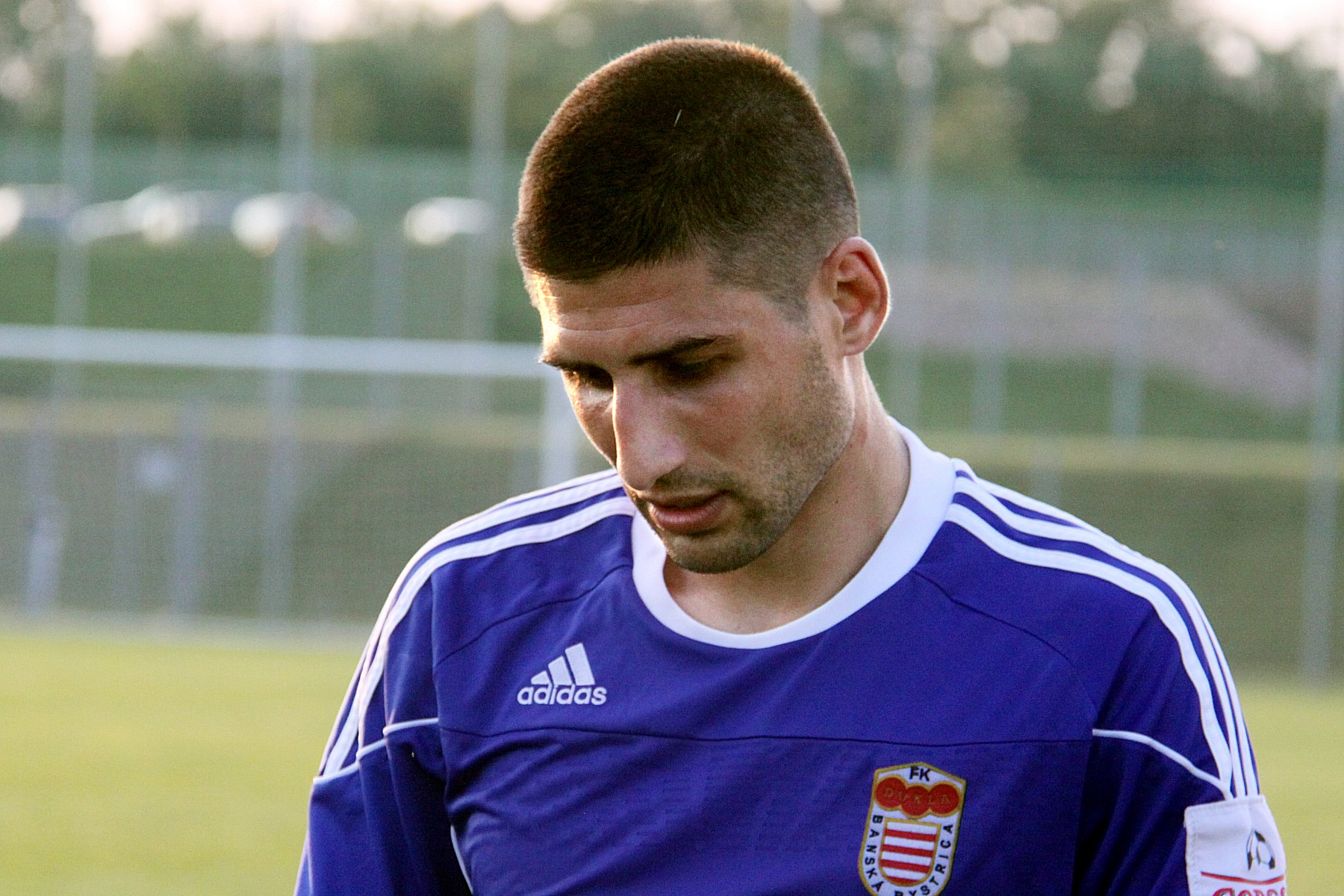
- Turňa with Dukla Banská Bystrica in 2013

Personal information
- Full name: Matúš Turňa
- Date of birth: 11 May 1986 (age 40)
- Place of birth: Brezno, Czechoslovakia
- Height: 1.80 m (5 ft 11 in)
- Position: Right back

Youth career
- ŠK Partizán Čierny Balog

Senior career*
Years	Team	Apps	(Gls)
- ŠK Partizán Čierny Balog
2004–2005	Dukla Banská Bystrica		
2006–2009	Železiarne Podbrezová		
2009–2013	Dukla Banská Bystrica	111	(9)
2014–2015	DAC Dunajská Streda	47	(0)
2016–2018	Železiarne Podbrezová	87	(2)
2019–2021	Spartak Trnava	51	(0)
2021–	Podkonice		
- * Club domestic league appearances and goals as of 15 August 2024

Matúš Turňa (born 11 May 1986) is a Slovak footballer who plays as a right back for the 3. liga (Západ) club FK Podkonice.

== Club career ==
Turňa joined DAC Dunajská Streda in February 2014. He was part of the team's starting lineup, but due to injuries had a reduced role in the 2015–16 season. He left the club on the expiry of his contract at the end of 2015. He was signed by Spartak Trnava in January 2019.

== Honours ==
Spartak Trnava

- Slovnaft Cup: 2018–19
