= Peter Štepanovský =

Slovak footballer

Personal information
- Full name: Peter Štepanovský
- Date of birth: 12 January 1988 (age 38)
- Place of birth: Skalica, Czechoslovakia
- Height: 1.75 m (5 ft 9 in)
- Positions: Winger; fullback

Team information
- Current team: Komárno
- Number: 21

Youth career
- Skalica
- 2004–2008: Slovan Bratislava

Senior career*
Years	Team	Apps	(Gls)
2008–2011	Slovan Bratislava	55	(1)
2012–2013	Senica	30	(4)
2013	→ Spartak Trnava (loan)	17	(2)
2014	FC Banants	13	(3)
2014–2017	Dunajská Streda	67	(8)
2017–2018	Karviná	21	(0)
2018–2022	Zbrojovka Brno	95	(19)
2022–	Komárno	29	(3)

International career
2010	Slovakia U21	2	(0)
- * Club domestic league appearances and goals as of 23 May 2023

Peter Štepanovský (born 12 January 1988) is a Slovak football midfielder who plays for KFC Komárno.

== Club career ==
Štepanovský was born in Skalica. Peter started his career in the youth system of MFK Skalica and later went to Slovak giants Slovan Bratislava. His equalizing goal against Roma meant procedure in the group stage UEFA Europa League in 2011/2012 season. In February 2012 Štepanovský signed a contract with FK Senica, playing in the Slovak Corgoň Liga.
