= Filip Lukšík =

Slovak footballer

Personal information
- Date of birth: 3 February 1985 (age 41)
- Place of birth: Banská Bystrica, Czechoslovakia
- Height: 1.86 m (6 ft 1 in)
- Position: Left-back

Youth career
- Dukla Banská Bystrica

Senior career*
Years	Team	Apps	(Gls)
2004–2005	Dukla Banská Bystrica	1	(0)
2005–2009	Sigma Olomouc	7	(0)
2005–2007	→ Lipová (loan)		
2008	→ Fotbal Třinec (loan)	11	(0)
2008–2009	→ AS Trenčín (loan)	32	(4)
2010	Odra Wodzisław	9	(0)
2010–2011	Senica	33	(3)
2011–2013	ADO Den Haag	11	(0)
2012–2013	→ Slovan Bratislava (loan)	23	(0)
2013–2014	Spartak Myjava	18	(1)
2014–2015	Erzgebirge Aue	30	(0)
2015–2016	Saarbrücken	32	(5)
2017–2020	Neustrelitz	98	(9)
2021–2023	Neustrelitz	2	(0)

International career
2011	Slovakia	2	(0)

Managerial career
- 2019–2020: Neustrelitz (player-assistant)
- 2021–2023: Neustrelitz (player-assistant)
- * Club domestic league appearances and goals

Filip Lukšík (born 3 February 1985) is a Slovak former professional footballer who played as a left-back.

== Club career ==
In 2010, he was join to Odra Wodzisław and played in polish Ekstraklasa. On 27 June 2011, he has signed two-year contract with option for Dutch club ADO Den Haag for an undisclosed fee. He was sent off in his ADO debut against FK Tauras in 1st leg of the 2011–12 UEFA Europa League 2nd qualifying round after his foul in the penalty area.

== International career ==
Lukšík made his national team debut in a 1–0 away win against Andorra on 26 March 2011.
