= Peter Boroš =

Slovak footballer

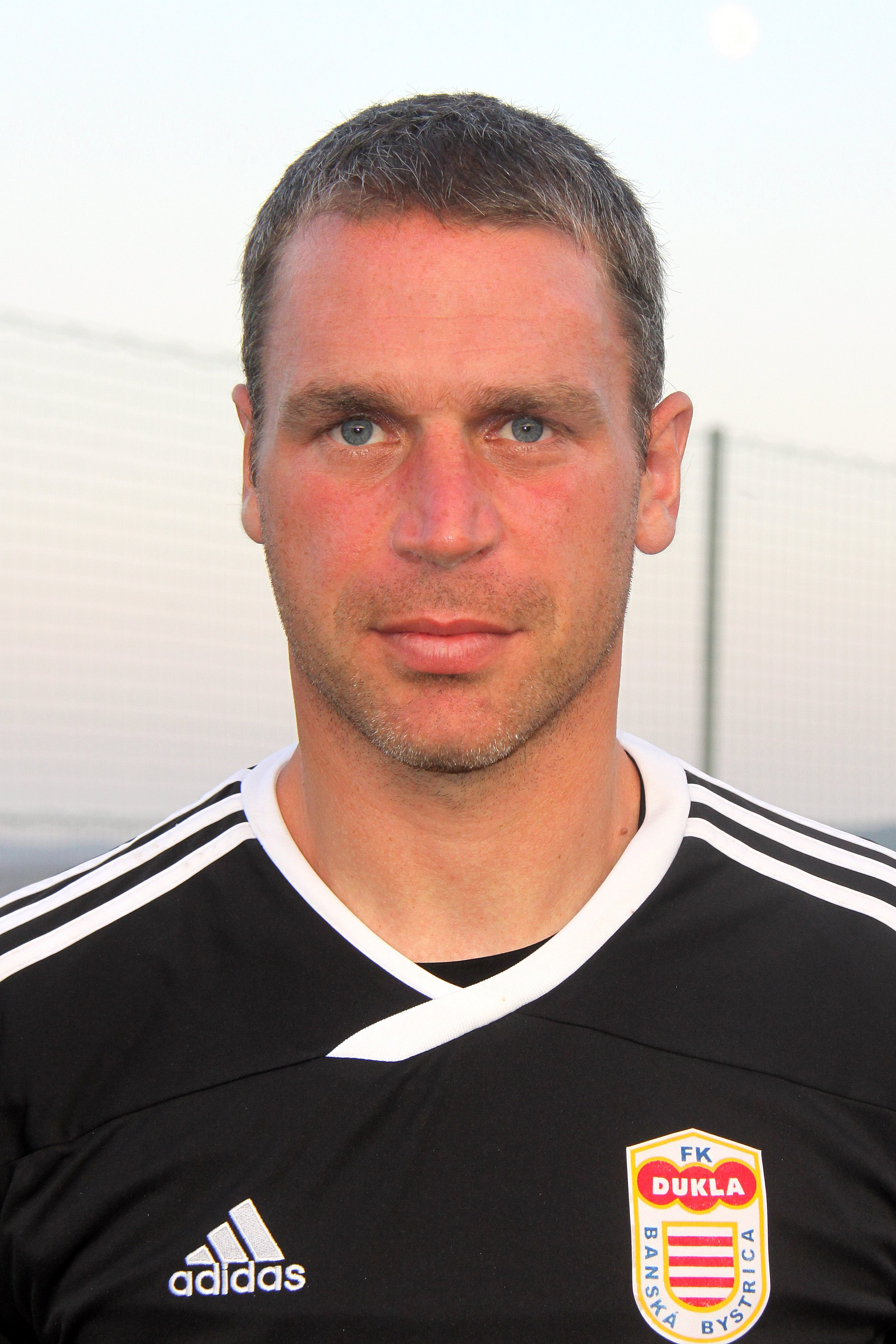

Personal information
- Full name: Peter Boroš
- Date of birth: 17 February 1980 (age 46)
- Place of birth: Banská Bystrica, Czechoslovakia
- Height: 1.94 m (6 ft 4 in)
- Position: Goalkeeper

Senior career*
| Years | Team | Apps | (Gls) |
- Banská Bystrica
| 2002–2003 | Nyíregyháza Spartacus | | |
| 2003–2016 | Banská Bystrica | 252 | (0) |

Managerial career
- 2016–: Podbrezová (goalkeeper coach)
- * Club domestic league appearances and goals as of 11 June 2016

Peter Boroš (born 17 February 1980) is a retired Slovak footballer who played as a goalkeeper for FK Dukla Banská Bystrica. After playing for Nyíregyháza Spartacus, Boroš joined Banská Bystrica before the start of the 2003–04 Slovak Superliga, coming as backup for first-choice 'keeper Richard Zajac. Boroš played his last professional match on 5 June 2016, in a 3–0 win against Spartak Trnava. He subsequently became goalkeeping coach for Podbrezová.
