= Pavol Jurčo =

Slovak footballer

Personal information
- Full name: Pavol Jurčo
- Date of birth: 12 February 1986 (age 40)
- Place of birth: Levoča, Czechoslovakia
- Height: 1.87 m (6 ft 2 in)
- Position: Forward

Team information
- Current team: FC VSS Košice

Youth career
- Spišská Nová Ves

Senior career*
Years	Team	Apps	(Gls)
- Horn
- Ružomberok
- Ličartovce
2005–2011	Košice	89	(12)
2009–2010	→ Tatran Prešov (loan)	18	(2)
2012	Viktoria Žižkov	9	(1)
2012–2013	Michalovce	31	(8)
2013	→ Banská Bystrica (loan)	19	(8)
2014	Žilina	12	(3)
2014	→ Dunajská Streda (loan)	5	(2)
2014–	Dunajská Streda	25	(2)
2016	→ VSS Košice (loan)	13	(5)
2016–	MFK Karviná	0	(0)

International career^{‡}
2007–2008	Slovakia U-21	12	(5)
- * Club domestic league appearances and goals as of 17 July 2016 ‡ National team caps and goals as of 12 February 2012

Pavol Jurčo (born 12 February 1986) is a Slovak football striker who currently plays for Czech club MFK Karviná.

== Club career ==
Made a guest appearance for Shamrock Rovers in a friendly against Newcastle on 11 July 2009 at Tallaght Stadium.

=== MŠK Žilina ===
On 9 February 2014, MFK Zemplín Michalovce sold Jurčo to MŠK Žilina for 60 thousand euros.

== Career statistics ==
Club	Season	League		Domestic Cup		Europe		Total	
Club	Season	Pld	GF	Pld	GF	Pld	GF	Pld	GF
MFK Košice	2006/07	28	6	1	0	0	0	29	6
MFK Košice	2007/08	24	3	5	1	0	0	29	4
MFK Košice	2008/09	4	0	0	0	0	0	4	0
Total		56	9	6	1	0	0	62	10

^{Last update at 19 June 2009}
