= MFK Vrbové =

Slovak football club

- Full name: MFK Vrbové
- Founded: 1922
- Ground: Štadión Vrbové, Vrbové
- Capacity: 1500
- Chairman: Peter Adamec
- Manager: Konštantín Šimo
- League: 3. liga
- 2011–12: 3. liga, 9th
- Website: http://mfk-vrbove.webnode.sk/
Home colours

MFK Vrbové is a Slovak football team, based in the town of Vrbové. The club was founded in 1922.

== History ==
In 2022, the club celebrated its 100th year of existence. In celebration, MFK Vrbové played a friendly against Slovak First Football League club, FC Spartak Trnava.

=== Historic names ===
- TJ Vrbové (Telovýchovná jednota Vrbové)
- MFK Vrbové (Mestský futbalový klub Vrbové)

== Stadium ==
MFK Vrbové plays all its home games in the Športový Štadión Města Vrbové, which has a capacity of 2,500 people. In 2020, the pitch was improved and a sports field was added by it.

== Notable players ==
- (Slovakia) Jozef Adamec
