= Ladislav Hudec (footballer) =

Slovak footballer and manager

Personal information
- Date of birth: 4 January 1957 (age 69)
- Place of birth: Bratislava, Czechoslovakia
- Position: Midfielder

Senior career*
Years	Team	Apps	(Gls)
1975–1987	Inter Bratislava	257	(19)
1987–1991	SF Berg		
1991–1994	Petržalka		
1994–1995	Pezinok		

Managerial career
- 1994–1995: Pezinok
- 1995–1997: Al-Ahli U19
- 1997–1998: Al-Nahda (assistant)
- 1999–2000: Podbrezová
- 2001–2003: Dunajská Streda
- 2003–2005: Slovakia U16-17
- 2005–2006: AS Trenčín
- 2006–2008: Slovan Bratislava
- 2008–2010: Senica
- 2010–2013: Spartak Myjava
- 2014: Nitra
- 2014–2017: Slovakia U16-17
- 2017–2018: Senica
- 2018–2021: Spartak Myjava
- 2022: FK Inter Bratislava
- 2023–2024: Spartak Myjava
- * Club domestic league appearances and goals as of 24 June 2014

Ladislav Hudec (born 4 January 1957) is a Slovak football manager and former player. He was appointed manager of Myjava in June 2010. He joined FK Inter Bratislava ahead of the spring part of the 2021–22 3. Liga (Slovakia), but left the club in mid-September of the same year by mutual consent. As a player, Hudec scored 19 times in 257 appearances in the Czechoslovak First League for Inter Bratislava between 1975 and 1986.

== Honours ==
=== Manager ===
Spartak Myjava

- DOXXbet liga: winners: 2011–12 (Promoted)
- 3.liga: winners: 2020-21
