= Myjava =

- Municipality
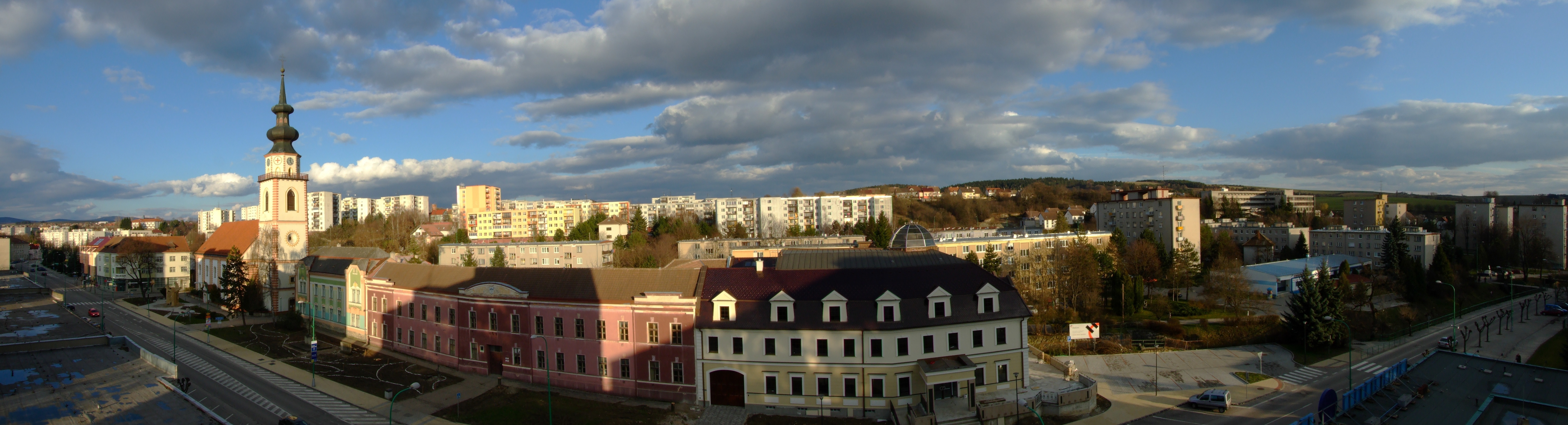

- Flag Coat of arms

- Location of Myjava in the Trenčín Region Location of Myjava in Slovakia
- Coordinates: 48.75°N 17.56°E
- Country: Slovakia
- Region: Trenčín Region
- District: Myjava District
- First mentioned: 1262

Government
  - Mayor: Marek Hrin

Area
  - Total: 48.54 km^{2} (18.74 sq mi)
- Elevation: 313 m (1,027 ft)

Population (2025)
  - Total: 10,316
- Time zone: UTC+1 (CET)
  - Summer (DST): UTC+2 (CEST)
- Postal code: 907 01
- Area code: +421 34
- Vehicle registration plate (until 2022): MY
- Website: www.myjava.sk

Myjava (Slovak pronunciation: [ˈmijaʋa]; historically also Miava, German: Miawa, Hungarian: Miava) is a town in Trenčín Region, Slovakia.

== Geography ==
The municipality lies at an altitude of 313 metres (1,027 ft) and covers an area of 48.54 km^{2} (18.74 sq mi) (2025).

It is located in the Myjava Hills at the foothills of the White Carpathians and nearby the Little Carpathians. The river Myjava flows through the town. It is 10 km away from the Czech border, 35 km from Skalica and 100 km from Bratislava.

== History ==
The settlement was established in 1533 and was colonized by two groups of inhabitants: refugees fleeing from the Ottomans in southern Upper Hungary (today mostly Slovakia) and inhabitants from north-western and northern Upper Hungary.

During the Revolutions of 1848, the first Slovak National Council met in the town as a result of the Slovak Uprising. Today, the house of their meeting is now part of the Museum of the Slovak National Councils, a part of the Slovak National Museum network.

Before the establishment of independent Czechoslovakia in 1918, Myjava was part of Nyitra County within the Kingdom of Hungary. From 1939 to 1945, it was part of the Slovak Republic. On 8 April 1945, the Red Army dislodged the Wehrmacht from Myjava and it was once again part of Czechoslovakia.

== Population ==
Historical population
Year	Pop.	±%
1970	9,227	—
1980	11,668	+26.5%
1991	13,135	+12.6%
2001	13,142	+0.1%
2011	12,330	−6.2%
2021	10,985	−10.9%
Source: Censuses

Population statistic (10 years)
Year	1995	2005	2015	2025
Count	13,282	12,811	11,953	10,316
Difference		−3.54%	−6.69%	−13.69%

Population statistic
Year	2024	2025
Count	10,453	10,316
Difference		−1.31%

It has a population of 10,316 people (31 December 2025).

=== Ethnicity ===
Census 2021 (1+%)
Ethnicity	Number	Fraction
Slovak	10,131	92.22%
Not found out	689	6.27%
Czech	178	1.62%
Total	10,985	

In year 2021 was 10,985 people by ethnicity 10,131 as Slovak, 689 as Not found out, 178 as Czech, 46 as Romani, 38 as Other, 27 as Romanian, 25 as Hungarian, 15 as Russian, 9 as Moravian, 8 as Vietnamese, 7 as Italian, 6 as Ukrainian, 5 as English, 4 as Turkish, 4 as Rusyn, 4 as Polish, 3 as Jewish, 3 as Serbian, 1 as Chinese, 1 as Austrian, 1 as German, 1 as Greek, 1 as French, 1 as Croatian and 1 as Bulgarian.

Note on population: The difference values of population numbers in the table "Population statistic" and in the sections "Ethnicity" & "Religion" is caused by the use of various statistical methods.

=== Religion ===
Census 2021 (1+%)
Religion	Number	Fraction
None	4403	40.08%
Evangelical Church	4183	38.08%
Roman Catholic Church	1220	11.11%
Not found out	880	8.01%
Total	10,985	

In year 2021 was 10,985 people by religion 4403 from None, 4183 from Evangelical Church, 1220 from Roman Catholic Church, 880 from Not found out, 67 from Jehovah's Witnesses, 40 from Ad hoc movements, 36 from Other, 29 from Greek Catholic Church, 21 from Buddhism, 18 from United Methodist Church, 13 from Other and not ascertained christian church, 11 from Eastern Orthodox Church, 11 from Islam, 9 from Seventh-day Adventist Church, 9 from Apostolic Church, 7 from Paganism and natural spirituality, 7 from Church of the Brethren, 6 from Calvinist Church, 5 from Old Catholic Church, 5 from Hinduism, 2 from Christian Congregations in Slovakia, 2 from Czechoslovak Hussite Church and 1 from Jewish community.

== Twin towns — sister cities ==
Myjava is twinned with:

- Dolní Němčí, Czech Republic
- Kostelec nad Orlicí, Czech Republic
- Flisa, Norway
- Åsnes, Norway
- Janošik, Serbia
- Oroszlány, Hungary
- (United States) Little Falls, NY
