= Spartak Myjava =

Slovak football club

- Full name: Spartak Myjava a.s.
- Nickname: Kopaničiari (The residents of Kopanice)
- Founded: 1920; 106 years ago as ŠK Myjava
- Ground: Stadium Myjava, Myjava
- Capacity: 2,709
- President: Pavel Halabrín
- Coach: Lukáš Kaplan
- League: 3. liga
- 2025-26: 2nd
- Website: http://www.spartakmyjava.sk
Home colours	Away colours

Spartak Myjava (Slovak pronunciation: [ˈspartak ˈmijaʋa]) is a Slovak football team, based in the town of Myjava. The club was founded in 1920.

== History ==
Spartak Myjava was founded on 8 August 1920 as Športový klub Myjava (ŠK Myjava). ŠK Myjava founder and first president of the local merchant and patron of the club p. Samuel Vráblica. ŠK had since the establishment of white – black striped jerseys, white shorts and black socks. This combination should symbolize the severity and continuity of the male folk costumes town of Myjava at the end of the lease agreement the court, it was necessary to find new space for the new football field. Skillful leadership and community officials agree that a new football stand for generous assistance officials, players and fans will be built on the lands of today's stock company STAS. Opening of new playground of the stadium was held on 6 June 1931. The founding footballers and those who later played out for our memory and the next generation, were: JUDr. Vladimír Valášek, Vladimír Varsík Štefan, Siváček, Karol Pikard, Ernest Hájnik – coach and others. Later Ján Kriška, Pavel Kováč, Štefan Dinga, Štefan Maniaček, Michal Vrána, Michal Dugáček and others.

=== 1937–1938 ===
A more comprehensive football development occurred in the years 1937 – 1938 the company moved from Tauš Petržalka to Myjava. With this company came and some of its employees and their ranks were also active as a football Jaroslav Pavlák, Jindro Polák, František Pospíšil and others. Then came other good players like Anton Stračár, Jozef Polák, Štefan Gažo and trainer Anton Král. Later he played in a team known Jozef Brún, Štefan Kubíček, Dušan Sadlon, Ján Alina, Ján Juráš and others. This team created the then fought for Myjava division in 1944, the competition was comparable to the former Slovak National League.

=== 1943–1955 ===
In 1943 the General Assembly decided to ŠK Myjava in order to create better conditions for further development of football to build on top of Myjava sports complex. Building a new grass field was implemented in 1954. The renovation was carried out in 1958, this time for a new approach, putting sod (mačín.) New quality conditions have left a long wait and yielded good results in terms of education more good players. E.g. Vl. Mokrohajský former Baník Ostrava player and national team of Czechoslovakia, Ján Martiš, Ivan Fajnor, Ján Čobrda, Michal Strapatý, Milan Vrána, Milan Zelenák and others. In 1955 the football team added another team of adults and one junior team and a team of students.

=== 1960–1990 ===
After a considerable slow down of football in 50 years flashed on better times in 1963, juniors under the guidance of coach Ivan Fajnor progressed to I. junior league, and a year later, A-team division in adults. After both teams went down from competitions. Then FO committee, headed by Pavol Černák, led the men's team a former successful representative coach Anton Moravčík and in 1968 advanced to the Regional Championships and juniors under the guidance of coach Štefan Sadloň again in the I. junior league. In this competition, the team stayed in the 1972–73 season, when relegated to the I.A class, later to the I.B class. In the year 1988/89 came to the team coach of the men near the village Vrboviec Miroslav Hainc, to complement and improve the squad and procedures 65.anniversary to higher competition. In the year 1989/90 team is struggling and the following year after the autumn while were at first, but they spring portion failed and after losing at the end of the competition finished in second place for the advancing of Piešťany.

=== 1999–2000 ===
In the year 1991/92 managed to strengthen the squad. The team has undergone a tender sovereign, when in meetings, won 23, draw 6 and lost the only one meeting and opponents scored 101 goals. So after 5 years, managed to advance to the Division. Coach was Miroslav Hainc. In the year 1995/96, men under the leadership of coach Hainc still managed to end the competition and finished in 3rd place. In the year 1996/97 for the autumn competition after 8.5 years of practice activities completed coaching coach Hainc. The team took over the former men's player of FC Spartak Trnava, Tatran Prešov and Slavia Prague Jaroslav Kravárik with assistant František Sasák. This year's team finished in second place for progressive FK Slovan Duslo Šaľa. The following season 97/98, the team really struggling and ended up in the bottom of the table, but still saved even with very compromised squad to Myjava, III. league. In season 1998/99 is returned to the team coach Hainc. Finally, the Myjava team finished in 9th place and the next season position is repeated. Football in Myjava reported success – older juniors and juniors promoted in first league.

=== 2012 – 2016 Corgoň Liga ===
The 2012–13 season was Spartak Myjava's first season in the Slovak top division. The match against MŠK Žilina champion from 2011–12 season was played on 13 July 2012 and was the first in the top tier in Slovakia football. The premiere Myjava lost 1–4 and consolation goal and historically the first goal in the Corgoň Liga was scored by defender Roman Častulín. In December 2016 during 5th season in Slovak Super Liga Spartak Myjava withdrew from the league.

== Honours ==
=== Domestic ===
- Slovak Super Liga (1993–)
  - Third place: 2015–16
- Slovak second division (1993–)
  - Winners: 2011–12
- Slovak third division (West) (1993–)
  - Winners: 2020–21

== European competitions history ==
Season	Competition	Round	Club	Home	Away	Aggregate
2016–17	UEFA Europa League	First qualifying round	(Austria) Admira Wacker	2–3	1–1	3–4

== Rivalries ==
Today, Spartak Myjava's biggest rival is near FK Senica, the matches between the two teams are referred to as "Záhorie-Kopanice derby". The first derby in the Slovak highest tier, was played on 24 August 2012, kopaničiari defeated Senica 1 – 0, goal scored captain Martin Černáček. Spartak Myjava supporters maintain friendly relations with fans of FC Petržalka 1898 and MFK Ružomberok.

== Sponsorship ==
Period	Kit manufacturer	Shirt sponsor
2010–12	Adidas	NAD RESS
2012–2014	Uhlsport	NAD RESS
2014–2015	Uhlsport	NAD RESS, Volvo
2015–2020	Uhlsport	NAD RESS
2020–	Erima	NAD RESS

Club partners

- NAD-RESS
- City of Myjava
- Cesty Nitra
- SCHERDEL
- Tubex
- Svanam
- SAMŠPORT
- TANKER

== Current squad ==
As of 1 July 2024

Note: Flags indicate national team as defined under FIFA eligibility rules; some limited exceptions apply. Players may hold more than one non-FIFA nationality.

No.	Pos.	Nation	Player
1	GK	SVK	Denis Kubica
5	MF	SVK	Samuel Flamík
7	MF	SEN	Alioune Sylla
9	MF	SVK	Dávid Copko
11	MF	SVK	Adam Cisár
13	MF	SVK	Tobiáš Čongrády
16	DF	SVK	Jerguš Halabrín

No.	Pos.	Nation	Player
22	MF	SVK	Maroš Čurik
23	MF	UKR	Oleh Vlasov
24	DF	SVK	Imrich Bedecs
28	GK	SVK	Patrik Opalek
29	FW	SVK	Samuel Prachar
30	GK	SVK	René Žákech

For recent transfers, see List of Slovak football transfers summer 2023.

== Current technical staff ==
As of 5 July 2022

Staff	Job title
(Slovakia) Lukáš Kaplan	Manager
(Slovakia) Peter Vavák	Assistant manager
(Slovakia) Daniel Kvasnica	Assistant manager
(Slovakia) Peter Solnička	Goalkeeper coach
(Slovakia) Ľuboš Zverec	Team leader
(Slovakia) MUDr. Milan Mokoš	Physio
(Slovakia) Ľubomír Horeš	Masseur

== Notable players ==
Had international caps for their respective countries. Players whose name is listed in bold represented their countries while playing for Spartak.

Past (and present) players who are the subjects of Wikipedia articles can be found here.

- (Slovakia) Marián Dirnbach
- (Slovakia) Pavol Farkaš
- (Slovakia) Filip Lukšík
- (Slovakia) Tomáš Kóňa
- (Czechoslovakia) Vladimír Mokrohajský
- (Slovakia) Filip Oršula
- (Slovakia) Juraj Piroska
- (Slovakia) Erik Sabo
- (Slovakia) Michal Šulla
- (Slovakia) Zdeno Štrba
- (Slovakia) Michal Tomič

== Managers ==
- (Slovakia) Ladislav Hudec (July 2010– Dec 2013)
- (Slovakia) Radúz Dorňák (23 Dec 2013– 31 May 2014)
- (Slovakia) Peter Gergely (1 June 2014– 1 June 2015)
- (Slovakia) Norbert Hrnčár (2 June 2015– 30 May 2016)
- (Slovakia) Mikuláš Radványi (June 2016– Dec 2016)
- (Slovakia) Vladimír Stančík (2017– 29 June 2018)
- (Slovakia) Ladislav Hudec (June 2018 – July 2021)
- (Slovakia) Daniel Kvasnica (2 July 2021 - 5 July 2022)
- (Slovakia) Lukáš Kaplan (5 July 2022 - 2023)
- (Slovakia) Ladislav Hudec (2023 - 2024)
- (Slovakia) Daniel Kvasnica (2024)
- (Slovakia) Adam Rechtorík (2024 - present)
