= List of Slovak football transfers summer 2012 =

This is a list of Slovak football transfers in the summer transfer window 2012 by club. Only transfers of the Corgoň Liga and 2. liga are included.

== Corgoň Liga ==
=== MŠK Žilina ===
In: Note: Flags indicate national team as defined under FIFA eligibility rules; some limited exceptions apply. Players may hold more than one non-FIFA nationality.

No.	Pos.	Nation	Player
21	FW	POR	Guima (from (Portugal) U.D. Oliveirense)
—	MF	SVK	Jakub Paur (loan return from FC ViOn Zlaté Moravce)
—	GK	SVK	Patrik Le Giang (loan return from MFK Zemplín Michalovce)
—	DF	GAM	Ali Ceesay (loan return from MFK Zemplín Michalovce)
—	MF	SVK	Michal Škvarka (loan return from MFK Zemplín Michalovce)
—	DF	SVK	Michal Janec (loan return from MFK Tatran Liptovský Mikuláš)
—	MF	SVK	Pavol Poliaček (loan return from (Czech Republic) FC Baník Ostrava)
—	FW	SVK	Ivan Lietava (loan return from (Czech Republic) FK Dukla Prague)
—	MF	SVK	Štefan Zošák (loan return from 1. FC Tatran Prešov)
—	FW	CZE	David Střihavka (loan return from 1. FC Tatran Prešov)

Out: Note: Flags indicate national team as defined under FIFA eligibility rules; some limited exceptions apply. Players may hold more than one non-FIFA nationality.

No.	Pos.	Nation	Player
29	DF	GHA	Prince Ofori (Released)
—	MF	SVK	Adam Žilák (on loan to FC ViOn Zlaté Moravce)
—	DF	SVK	Juraj Chupač (on loan to MFK Košice)
—	FW	SVK	Ivan Lietava (to (Ukraine) FC Vorskla Poltava)
—	FW	SVK	Ján Novák (on loan to MFK Košice)
—	GK	SVK	Matej Rakovan (on loan to (Czech Republic) MFK Karviná)
—	DF	SVK	Michal Janec (on loan to MFK Tatran Liptovský Mikuláš)
—	MF	SVK	Emil Le Giang (to (Czech Republic) MFK Karviná)
—	FW	SVK	Dominik Fotyik (to (Hungary) Kazincbarcikai SC)
—	FW	CZE	David Střihavka (to (Czech Republic) 1. FK Příbram)
—	MF	SVK	Štefan Zošák (Released)
—	DF	GAM	Ali Ceesay (on loan to FC ŠTK 1914 Šamorín)
—	FW	SVK	René Dedič (on loan to FC ŠTK 1914 Šamorín)
—	MF	SVK	Vladimír Fuják (on loan to MFK Tatran Liptovský Mikuláš)
—	FW	SVK	Tomáš Majtán (to (Czech Republic) FC Baník Ostrava)
—	MF	SVK	Pavol Poliaček (on loan to TJ Baník Ružiná)

=== FC Spartak Trnava ===
In: Note: Flags indicate national team as defined under FIFA eligibility rules; some limited exceptions apply. Players may hold more than one non-FIFA nationality.

No.	Pos.	Nation	Player
33	MF	SVK	Michal Gašparík (from (Poland) Górnik Zabrze)
—	MF	CZE	Vlastimil Stožický (from (Czech Republic) FK Teplice)
—	GK	SVK	Miroslav Filipko (from (Czech Republic) 1. FC Slovácko)
—	FW	SVK	Ľubomír Gogolák (loan return from ŠK SFM Senec)
—	DF	SVK	Marek Janečka (from FC ViOn Zlaté Moravce)
—	FW	ALG	Samy Derras (from PFK Piešťany)
—	MF	SVK	Erik Sabo (loan return from Spartak Myjava)
—	FW	BIH	Stevo Nikolić (from (Hungary) Debreceni VSC)
—	MF	SVK	Ján Vlasko (on loan from (Czech Republic) FC Slovan Liberec)

Out: Note: Flags indicate national team as defined under FIFA eligibility rules; some limited exceptions apply. Players may hold more than one non-FIFA nationality.

No.	Pos.	Nation	Player
1	GK	SVK	Ľuboš Kamenár (loan return to (France) FC Nantes)
6	MF	SVK	Roman Procházka (to (Bulgaria) Levski Sofia)
13	MF	SVK	Peter Kuračka (on loan to Spartak Myjava)
15	DF	CZE	Josef Kaufman (loan return to (Czech Republic) Slavia Prague)
33	MF	SVK	Michal Gašparík (loan return to (Poland) Górnik Zabrze)
—	MF	SVK	Ján Petráš (on extended loan to Spartak Myjava)
—	MF	SVK	Erik Sabo (on extended loan to Spartak Myjava)

=== ŠK Slovan Bratislava ===
In: Note: Flags indicate national team as defined under FIFA eligibility rules; some limited exceptions apply. Players may hold more than one non-FIFA nationality.

No.	Pos.	Nation	Player
—	FW	SVK	Filip Hlohovský (from AS Trenčín)
—	GK	SVK	Pavel Kováč (extended loan from MFK Dubnica)
—	MF	SVK	Boris Turčák (loan return from ŠK SFM Senec)
—	FW	BIH	Krešimir Kordić (loan return from FK DAC 1904 Dunajská Streda)
—	FW	SVK	Marek Kuzma (loan return from FK Dukla Banská Bystrica)
—	MF	SVK	Radoslav Augustín (loan return from FK Dukla Banská Bystrica)
16	DF	ARG	Nicolas Ezequiel Gorosito (from FK Senica)
—	FW	TTO	Lester Peltier (from AS Trenčín)
—	DF	SVK	Filip Lukšík (on loan from (Netherlands) ADO Den Haag)
—	DF	SVK	Branislav Niňaj (from FC Petržalka 1898)
—	DF	CZE	Milan Kopic (from (Netherlands) SC Heerenveen)
—	FW	ARG	Leandro Ledesma (from (Argentina) Club Social y Deportivo La Emilia)

Out: Note: Flags indicate national team as defined under FIFA eligibility rules; some limited exceptions apply. Players may hold more than one non-FIFA nationality.

No.	Pos.	Nation	Player
3	DF	SVK	Mário Pečalka (loan return to (Israel) Hapoel Tel Aviv)
5	DF	SVK	Roman Konečný (Released)
6	DF	SVK	Martin Dobrotka (to (Czech Republic) SK Slavia Prague)
16	MF	RUS	Nika Piliyev (loan return to (Russia) CSKA Moscow)
20	FW	CZE	Ondřej Smetana (loan return to (Belgium) Sint-Truidense VV)
—	MF	SVK	Branislav Obžera (on loan to FK DAC 1904 Dunajská Streda)
—	DF	SVK	Marián Had (on loan to FK DAC 1904 Dunajská Streda)
—	GK	SVK	Peter Bartalský (to AS Trenčín)
—	FW	BIH	Krešimir Kordić (to (Bosnia and Herzegovina) NK Široki Brijeg)
—	MF	SVK	Radoslav Augustín (on loan to FK Dukla Banská Bystrica)
—	FW	SVK	Marek Kuzma (on loan to (Czech Republic) 1. FC Slovácko)
—	FW	SVK	Juraj Piroska (on loan to FK Senica)

=== FK Senica ===
In: Note: Flags indicate national team as defined under FIFA eligibility rules; some limited exceptions apply. Players may hold more than one non-FIFA nationality.

No.	Pos.	Nation	Player
1	GK	SVK	Michal Šulla (loan return from MFK Vrbové)
—	FW	SVK	Pavol Masaryk (from MFK Ružomberok)
—	GK	CZE	Milan Švenger (on loan from (Czech Republic) Sparta Prague)
—	DF	SVK	Matej Krajčík (from (Czech Republic) FK Baumit Jablonec)
—	DF	CZE	Erich Brabec (from (Czech Republic) Sparta Prague)
—	DF	CZE	Martin Frýdek (on loan from (Czech Republic) Sparta Prague)
—	DF	CZE	Miroslav Štěpánek (from (Germany) Hamburger SV)
—	MF	SVK	Martin Babic (on loan from FC ViOn Zlaté Moravce)
—	DF	CZE	Václav Koutný (on loan from (Czech Republic) SK Sigma Olomouc)
—	FW	CZE	Adam Varadi (on loan from (Czech Republic) SK Sigma Olomouc)
—	FW	SVK	Juraj Piroska (on loan from ŠK Slovan Bratislava)

Out: Note: Flags indicate national team as defined under FIFA eligibility rules; some limited exceptions apply. Players may hold more than one non-FIFA nationality.

No.	Pos.	Nation	Player
1	GK	SVK	Michal Šulla (on loan to Spartak Myjava)
2	MF	CZE	Tomáš Strnad (to (Czech Republic) FC Hradec Králové)
5	DF	CRC	Pedro Leal (loan return to (Panama) Puntarenas F.C.)
16	DF	ARG	Nicolas Ezequiel Gorosito (to ŠK Slovan Bratislava)
21	DF	SVK	Marián Štrbák (loan return to Spartak Bánovce nad Bebravou)
26	GK	CZE	Petr Bolek (to (Czech Republic) FC Viktoria Plzeň)
—	MF	BRA	Bolinha (on loan to FC ViOn Zlaté Moravce)
—	FW	CZE	Petr Hošek (on loan to FK DAC 1904 Dunajská Streda)

=== FK AS Trenčín ===
In: Note: Flags indicate national team as defined under FIFA eligibility rules; some limited exceptions apply. Players may hold more than one non-FIFA nationality.

No.	Pos.	Nation	Player
—	DF	BRA	Ramon (from (Brazil) Itabuna)
—	FW	SVK	Marek Frimmel (from Baník Horná Nitra)
—	MF	SVK	Karol Mondek (loan return from (Netherlands) AGOVV Apeldoorn)
—	MF	SVK	Lukáš Ďuriška (loan return from (Netherlands) AGOVV Apeldoorn)
—	GK	SVK	Peter Bartalský (from ŠK Slovan Bratislava)
—	FW	NGR	Fanendo Adi (from (Ukraine) SC Tavriya Simferopol)
—	FW	SVK	František Kubík (from (Ukraine) SC Tavriya Simferopol)

Out: Note: Flags indicate national team as defined under FIFA eligibility rules; some limited exceptions apply. Players may hold more than one non-FIFA nationality.

No.	Pos.	Nation	Player
—	FW	SVK	Filip Hlohovský (to Slovan Bratislava)
—	FW	TTO	Lester Peltier (to Slovan Bratislava)
—	MF	SVK	Vojtech Horváth (Released)
—	DF	SRB	Mirko Radovanović (to (Serbia) FK Smederevo)
—	GK	SVK	Matej Vozár (on loan to (Italy) Spezia Calcio)
—	MF	PAR	Jorge Salinas (to (Poland) Legia Warsaw)
—	FW	SVK	Peter Štyvar (to ŠK SFM Senec)
—	DF	SEN	Papé Diakite (Released)
—	DF	SVK	René Šiko (on loan to FK Slovan Nemšová)
—	MF	SVK	Lukáš Kyselica (on loan to FK Slovan Nemšová)
—	MF	SVK	Adam Morong (on loan to MFK Tatran Liptovský Mikuláš)
—	FW	SVK	Tomáš Malec (on loan to MFK Tatran Liptovský Mikuláš)

=== MFK Ružomberok ===
In: Note: Flags indicate national team as defined under FIFA eligibility rules; some limited exceptions apply. Players may hold more than one non-FIFA nationality.

No.	Pos.	Nation	Player
—	FW	COD	Mulumba Mukendi (from (South Africa) FC Cape Town)

Out: Note: Flags indicate national team as defined under FIFA eligibility rules; some limited exceptions apply. Players may hold more than one non-FIFA nationality.

No.	Pos.	Nation	Player
2	DF	SVK	Michal Gallo (to (Czech Republic) FC MAS Táborsko)
3	DF	SVK	Richard Lásik (loan return to (Italy) Brescia Calcio)
4	DF	SVK	Jaroslav Kostelný (to (Czech Republic) SFC Opava)
9	MF	CZE	Jiří Skalák (loan return to (Czech Republic) Sparta Prague)
11	MF	SVK	Peter Hoferica (on loan to MŠK Rimavská Sobota)
14	FW	SRB	Miroslav Marković (loan return to (Czech Republic) FK Dukla Prague)
15	MF	SVK	Ján Chovanec (to (Czech Republic) FK Teplice)
20	FW	SVK	Pavol Masaryk (to FK Senica)
22	MF	KEN	Patrick Oboya (Released)
30	GK	SVK	Roman Smieška (Released)
33	GK	SVK	Libor Hrdlička (Released)

=== FC ViOn Zlaté Moravce ===
In: Note: Flags indicate national team as defined under FIFA eligibility rules; some limited exceptions apply. Players may hold more than one non-FIFA nationality.

No.	Pos.	Nation	Player
—	DF	SVK	Marek Janečka (loan return from (Germany) FC Hansa Rostock)
—	MF	BRA	Bolinha (on loan from FK Senica)
—	MF	SVK	Adam Žilák (on loan from MŠK Žilina)
—	MF	SVK	Michal Obročník (on loan from MŠK Rimavská Sobota)
—	DF	SVK	Milan Bortel (on loan from ŠKF Sereď)
—	MF	SVK	Lukáš Janič (from (Poland) Sandecja Nowy Sącz)
—	MF	SVK	Michal Škvarka (on loan from MŠK Žilina)
—	GK	SVK	Martin Matlák (from ŠK SFM Senec)

Out: Note: Flags indicate national team as defined under FIFA eligibility rules; some limited exceptions apply. Players may hold more than one non-FIFA nationality.

No.	Pos.	Nation	Player
—	MF	CZE	Martin Hruška (to (Czech Republic) FC Fastav Zlín)
—	DF	SVK	Martin Husár (to (Czech Republic) FC Zbrojovka Brno)
—	FW	SVK	Andrej Brčák (loan return to MŠK Námestovo)
—	MF	SVK	Jakub Paur (loan return to MŠK Žilina)
—	MF	SVK	Martin Babic (on loan to FK Senica)
—	DF	SVK	Marek Janečka (to FC Spartak Trnava)
—	MF	SVK	Martin Luhový (to TJ ISKRA Borčice)
—	MF	SVK	Juraj Pilát (on loan to ŠKF Sereď)
—	FW	SVK	Ladislav Žák (on loan to AFC Nové Mesto nad Váhom)

=== FC Nitra ===
In: Note: Flags indicate national team as defined under FIFA eligibility rules; some limited exceptions apply. Players may hold more than one non-FIFA nationality.

No.	Pos.	Nation	Player
—	FW	SVK	Róbert Rák (loan return from MFK Zemplín Michalovce)
—	MF	SVK	Lukáš Zelenický (loan return from PFK Piešťany)
—	DF	SVK	Marek Szabó (from FK LAFC Lučenec)
—	DF	SVK	Peter Mičic (from (Poland) KS Polkowice)
—	DF	SVK	Peter Struhár (from (Austria) SV Kapfenberg)

Out: Note: Flags indicate national team as defined under FIFA eligibility rules; some limited exceptions apply. Players may hold more than one non-FIFA nationality.

No.	Pos.	Nation	Player
3	DF	SVK	Martin Tóth (to (Czech Republic) FC Slovan Liberec)
8	MF	SVK	Igor Držík (loan return to (Czech Republic) Bohemians 1905)
25	DF	CZE	Ondřej Murín (loan return to (Czech Republic) SK Sigma Olomouc)
28	DF	SVK	Ján Čirik (loan return to FK Slovan Duslo Šaľa)
—	FW	SVK	Róbert Rák (to (Austria) ATSV Ober-Grafendorf)

=== FK Dukla Banská Bystrica ===
In: Note: Flags indicate national team as defined under FIFA eligibility rules; some limited exceptions apply. Players may hold more than one non-FIFA nationality.

No.	Pos.	Nation	Player
—	DF	SVK	Matej Podstavek (from Partizán Čierny Balog)
—	FW	SVK	Dušan Uškovič (loan return from MFK Zemplín Michalovce)
—	MF	SVK	Milan Ferenčík (on loan from (Czech Republic) FC Baník Ostrava)
—	MF	SVK	Radoslav Augustín (extended loan from ŠK Slovan Bratislava)
—	DF	SVK	Peter Chrappan (from Free agent)
—	MF	SVK	Peter Rybanský (from (Czech Republic) FC Slovan Liberec)
—	FW	UKR	Viktor Sakhniuk (on loan from MFK Ružomberok)

Out: Note: Flags indicate national team as defined under FIFA eligibility rules; some limited exceptions apply. Players may hold more than one non-FIFA nationality.

No.	Pos.	Nation	Player
11	MF	SVK	Marek Bažík (Released)
20	FW	SVK	Marek Kuzma (loan return to ŠK Slovan Bratislava)
—	DF	SVK	Juraj Chupač (loan return to MŠK Žilina)
—	MF	SVK	Radoslav Augustín (loan return to ŠK Slovan Bratislava)
—	FW	SVK	Dušan Uškovič (to (Czech Republic) FC Hradec Králové)
—	DF	SVK	Ľuboš Kupčík (on loan to ŽP Šport Podbrezová)
—	FW	SVK	Patrik Johancsik (on loan to FK DAC 1904 Dunajská Streda)

=== 1. FC Tatran Prešov ===
In: Note: Flags indicate national team as defined under FIFA eligibility rules; some limited exceptions apply. Players may hold more than one non-FIFA nationality.

No.	Pos.	Nation	Player
—	MF	SVK	Martin Pribula (loan return from MŠK Rimavská Sobota)
—	FW	BRA	Mariano Bernardo (loan return from (Czech Republic) 1. FK Příbram)
—	FW	BUL	Branimir Kostadinov (on loan from (Bulgaria) FC Botev Vratsa)
—	DF	SVK	Jozef Adámik (from (Czech Republic) FC Baník Ostrava)
—	MF	SVK	Miroslav Poliaček (on loan from MFK Ružomberok)
—	DF	MNE	Dejan Boljević (from (Serbia) FK Smederevo)
—	FW	UKR	Andriy Shevchuk (from (Ukraine) FC Sevastopol)
—	MF	UKR	Andriy Yakovlev (from Free agent)
—	MF	SVK	Štefan Zošák (on loan from MŠK Žilina)

Out: Note: Flags indicate national team as defined under FIFA eligibility rules; some limited exceptions apply. Players may hold more than one non-FIFA nationality.

No.	Pos.	Nation	Player
2	DF	SVK	Michal Piter-Bučko (to (Poland) Podbeskidzie Bielsko-Biała)
21	DF	CZE	Jan Krob (loan return to (Czech Republic) AC Sparta Prague)
22	FW	CZE	David Střihavka (loan return to MŠK Žilina)
25	FW	ARM	Narek Beglaryan (loan return to (Armenia) FC Mika)
26	MF	SVK	Štefan Zošák (loan return to MŠK Žilina)
44	MF	UKR	Andriy Yakovlev (loan return to (Ukraine) FC Poltava)
80	DF	SVK	Lukáš Štetina (loan return to (Ukraine) FC Metalist Kharkiv)
—	MF	SVK	Ľubomír Ivanko-Macej (on loan to Partizán Bardejov)
—	MF	SVK	Ján Dzúrik (on loan to Partizán Bardejov)
—	DF	SVK	Artúr Benes (on loan to Partizán Bardejov)
—	DF	CZE	Jakub Heidenreich (Released)
—	FW	BRA	Mariano Bernardo (to Reserve team)
—	FW	SVK	Michal Kamenčík (on loan to MŠK Rimavská Sobota)
—	MF	SVK	Pavol Baláž (on loan to MFK Topvar Topoľčany)
—	GK	SVK	Maroš Ferenc (Released)
—	MF	BRA	Rafael Torres (on loan to MFK Zemplín Michalovce)
—	MF	UKR	Anton Lysyuk (Released)

=== MFK Košice ===
In: Note: Flags indicate national team as defined under FIFA eligibility rules; some limited exceptions apply. Players may hold more than one non-FIFA nationality.

No.	Pos.	Nation	Player
—	DF	SVK	Juraj Chupač (on loan from MŠK Žilina)
—	FW	SVK	Matúš Digoň (loan return from FC Lokomotíva Košice)
—	FW	SVK	Róbert Ujčík (loan return from MFK Dolný Kubín)
—	DF	SVK	Peter Bašista (from Free agent)
—	FW	SVK	Ján Novák (on loan from MŠK Žilina)
—	FW	FRA	Oumar Diaby (from R.C.O. Agathois)

Out: Note: Flags indicate national team as defined under FIFA eligibility rules; some limited exceptions apply. Players may hold more than one non-FIFA nationality.

No.	Pos.	Nation	Player
1	GK	ESP	Fernando (to (Spain) Coruxo FC)
4	DF	SRB	Ivan Đoković (End of contract, next to (Serbia) FK Novi Pazar)
9	FW	SVK	Erik Pačinda (on loan to FC Tours)
22	FW	SRB	Samir Nurković (Released)
—	GK	SRB	Miloje Preković (Released)
—	DF	ESP	Stefan Milojević (to (Serbia) BSK Borča)
—	DF	MKD	Sakir Redzepi (to ACS Poli Timişoara)
—	DF	SVK	Timon Dobias (Released)
—	MF	FRA	Floris Isola (Released)

=== TJ Spartak Myjava ===
In: Note: Flags indicate national team as defined under FIFA eligibility rules; some limited exceptions apply. Players may hold more than one non-FIFA nationality.

No.	Pos.	Nation	Player
—	MF	SVK	Peter Kuračka (on loan from Spartak Trnava)
—	DF	SVK	Peter Majerník (from (Romania) FC Brașov)
—	DF	SVK	Tomáš Mrva (from MFK Dubnica)
—	MF	SVK	Tomáš Marček (from AFC Nové Mesto nad Váhom)
—	FW	SVK	Lukáš Šebek (from AFC Nové Mesto nad Váhom)
—	MF	SVK	Ján Petráš (extended loan from Spartak Trnava)
—	MF	SVK	Erik Sabo (extended loan from Spartak Trnava)
—	DF	SVK	Matej Siva (from (Czech Republic) FK Teplice)
—	MF	SVK	Vladimír Kukoľ (from (Poland) Zawisza Bydgoszcz)
—	GK	SVK	Michal Šulla (on loan from FK Senica)
—	FW	SVK	Zoltán Harsányi (on loan from (Hungary) Pécsi MFC)
—	MF	SVK	Tomáš Bruško (from Free agent)

Out: Note: Flags indicate national team as defined under FIFA eligibility rules; some limited exceptions apply. Players may hold more than one non-FIFA nationality.

No.	Pos.	Nation	Player
5	DF	SVK	Ivan Chalány (loan return to ŠK Blava Jaslovské Bohunice)
25	GK	SVK	Jaroslav Mareček (Released)
—	MF	SVK	Miroslav Manák (Released)
—	FW	SVK	Ľubomír Ulrich (on loan to PFK Piešťany)
24	MF	SVK	Erik Sabo (loan return to FC Spartak Trnava)
—	MF	SVK	Zdeno Štrba (Released)
—	FW	SVK	Pavol Straka (Released)
—	DF	SVK	Marcel Onder (on loan to OTJ Moravany nad Váhom)
—	DF	SVK	Lukáš Bruško (on loan to TBC)

== 2. liga ==
=== FK DAC 1904 Dunajská Streda ===
In: Note: Flags indicate national team as defined under FIFA eligibility rules; some limited exceptions apply. Players may hold more than one non-FIFA nationality.

No.	Pos.	Nation	Player
—	GK	SVK	Martin Poláček (on loan from 1. FC Tatran Prešov)
—	MF	CZE	Radim Diviš (on loan from (Czech Republic) MFK Karviná)
—	FW	CZE	Dušan Nulíček (on loan from (Czech Republic) FK Baumit Jablonec)
—	DF	SVK	Patrik Banovič (on loan from FC Spartak Trnava)
—	MF	SVK	Peter Fieber (on loan from FK LAFC Lučenec)
—	MF	CMR	Paul Kweuke (from (Cameroon) Cintra Yaoundé)
—	MF	SVK	Stanislav Velický (from (Czech Republic) FC Vysočina Jihlava)
—	MF	SVK	Branislav Obžera (on loan from ŠK Slovan Bratislava)
—	FW	SVK	Patrik Johancsik (on loan from FK Dukla Banská Bystrica)
—	MF	CMR	Martin Abena (loan return from (Czech Republic) AC Sparta Prague)
—	DF	CZE	Miroslav Hozda (from (Czech Republic) FK Varnsdorf)
—	MF	BIH	Salko Jazvin (from (Bosnia and Herzegovina) FK Željezničar Sarajevo)
—	FW	CZE	Petr Hošek (from FK Senica)
—	MF	CRO	Darijo Pecirep (from (Austria) 1. Simmeringer SC)
—	GK	SVK	Lukáš Jamroškovič (on loan from MŠK Tesla Stropkov)

Out: Note: Flags indicate national team as defined under FIFA eligibility rules; some limited exceptions apply. Players may hold more than one non-FIFA nationality.

No.	Pos.	Nation	Player
—	FW	CGO	John Delarge (to (Czech Republic) FC Slovan Liberec)
—	GK	BIH	Krešimir Kordić (loan return to ŠK Slovan Bratislava)
—	MF	SVK	Pavol Ďurica (to (Austria) SC Ritzing)
—	FW	CZE	Lukáš Matůš (to (Austria) SC Ostbahn XI)
—	GK	CZE	Pavel Kučera (loan return to (Czech Republic) SK Dynamo České Budějovice)
—	DF	CZE	Josef Laštovka (Released)
—	DF	CZE	Aleš Urbánek (Released)
—	MF	CZE	Jiří Kabele (Released)
—	GK	SVK	Daniel Kiss (Released)
—	MF	SVK	Andrej Hanták (Released)
—	MF	SVK	Ján Hözl (loan return to FC ViOn Zlaté Moravce)
—	DF	BIH	Staniša Nikolić (to (Bosnia and Herzegovina) FK Sloboda Tuzla)
—	MF	CMR	Martin Abena (to (Bulgaria) Lokomotiv Sofia)
—	MF	GAB	Arsène Copa (to (Gabon) AS Mangasport)
—	FW	CMR	Joël Tchami (to (Hungary) Egri FC)
—	MF	SVK	Csaba Králik (to (Hungary) Szigetszentmiklosi TK)

=== ŽP Šport Podbrezová ===
In: Note: Flags indicate national team as defined under FIFA eligibility rules; some limited exceptions apply. Players may hold more than one non-FIFA nationality.

No.	Pos.	Nation	Player
—	DF	SVK	Stanislav Morháč (from MŠK Rimavská Sobota)
—	FW	SVK	Blažej Vaščák (on loan from Partizán Bardejov)
—	DF	SVK	Ľuboš Kupčík (on loan from FK Dukla Banská Bystrica)
—	GK	SVK	Patrik Gábriš (on loan from FK Jupie Podlavice)
—	MF	SVK	Michal Cmarko (on loan from FC Baník Horná Nitra)

Out: Note: Flags indicate national team as defined under FIFA eligibility rules; some limited exceptions apply. Players may hold more than one non-FIFA nationality.

No.	Pos.	Nation	Player
—	GK	SVK	Pater Palider (on loan to FK 34 Brusno)
—	MF	SVK	Erik Gemzický (on loan to FK 34 Brusno)
—	MF	SVK	Radomír Trnovec (on loan to MFK Dolný Kubín)
—	FW	SVK	Martin Sedliak (on loan to Horná Ždaňa)
—	FW	SVK	Marko Lukáč (on loan to Partizán Bardejov)
—	DF	SVK	Pavel Vrabec (on loan to MFK Tatran Liptovský Mikuláš)
—	MF	SVK	Lukáš Betka (on loan to MFK Detva)
—	GK	SVK	Igor Katreniak (on loan to MŠK Rimavská Sobota)

=== MFK Dolný Kubín ===
In: Note: Flags indicate national team as defined under FIFA eligibility rules; some limited exceptions apply. Players may hold more than one non-FIFA nationality.

No.	Pos.	Nation	Player
—	DF	SVK	Tomáš Gejdoš (from MFK Ružomberok)
—	FW	SVK	Andrej Brčák (on loan from FK Nižná)
—	MF	SVK	Radomír Trnovec (on loan from ŽP Šport Podbrezová)
—	MF	SVK	Milan Sirota (on loan from ŠK Tvrdošín)
—	DF	SVK	Ľubomír Tunega (from TJ Tatran Bobot)
—	MF	SVK	Michal Jadroň (on loan from MŠK Žilina)
—	FW	SVK	Róbert Ujčík (on loan from MFK Košice)
—	DF	SVK	Michal Kutlík (on loan from MFK Ružomberok)
—	FW	SVK	Tomáš Chovanec (from (Czech Republic) MFK Karviná)

Out: Note: Flags indicate national team as defined under FIFA eligibility rules; some limited exceptions apply. Players may hold more than one non-FIFA nationality.

No.	Pos.	Nation	Player
—	DF	SVK	Ján Čarnota (to MFK Zemplín Michalovce)
—	GK	SVK	Tomáš Papiak (End of career)
—	DF	SVK	Jozef Demko (loan return to MFK Tatran Liptovský Mikuláš)
—	MF	SRB	Bojan Šalipur (Released)
—	DF	SVK	Ivan Stupak (Released)
—	FW	SRB	Nikola Kosović (Released)
—	MF	SVK	Radomír Trnovec (Released)

=== ŠK SFM Senec ===
In: Note: Flags indicate national team as defined under FIFA eligibility rules; some limited exceptions apply. Players may hold more than one non-FIFA nationality.

No.	Pos.	Nation	Player
—	FW	SVK	Ľubomír Gogolák (on loan from FC Spartak Trnava)
—	MF	SVK	Igor Držík (on loan from (Czech Republic) Bohemians 1905)
—	MF	SVK	Tomáš Jakubovie (on loan from FK Dukla Banská Bystrica)
—	MF	SVK	Peter Štalmach (on loan from MŠK Žilina)
—	DF	SVK	Tomáš Hanzel (from FC Petržalka 1898)
—	FW	SVK	Peter Štyvar (from FK AS Trenčín)

Out: Note: Flags indicate national team as defined under FIFA eligibility rules; some limited exceptions apply. Players may hold more than one non-FIFA nationality.

No.	Pos.	Nation	Player
—	GK	SVK	Martin Matlák (to FC ViOn Zlaté Moravce)
—	MF	SVK	Martin Železník (loan return to FC Spartak Trnava)
—	FW	SVK	Ľubomír Gogolák (loan return to FC Spartak Trnava)
—	FW	SVK	Boris Turčák (loan return to ŠK Slovan Bratislava)
—	DF	SVK	Viktor Hall (Released)
—	MF	SVK	Michal Habai (Released)
—	FW	SVK	Peter Šnegoň (Released)

=== MŠK Rimavská Sobota ===
In: Note: Flags indicate national team as defined under FIFA eligibility rules; some limited exceptions apply. Players may hold more than one non-FIFA nationality.

No.	Pos.	Nation	Player
—	GK	SVK	Igor Katreniak (on loan from ŽP Šport Podbrezová)
—	DF	SVK	Miroslav Gálik (on loan from FK Dukla Banská Bystrica)
—	MF	SVK	Peter Nilaš (on loan from FC Baník Veľký Krtíš)
—	DF	SVK	Martin Poleť (on loan from MŠK Žilina)
—	FW	JPN	Yuki Nakamura (on loan from (Czech Republic) FK Viktoria Žižkov)
—	MF	SVK	Jozef Čertík (on loan from (Czech Republic) FC Zenit Čáslav)
—	MF	SVK	Lukáš Lupták (on loan from MFK Ružomberok)
—	FW	SVK	Michal Kamenčík (on loan from 1. FC Tatran Prešov)
—	MF	SVK	Peter Hoferica (on loan from MFK Ružomberok)

Out: Note: Flags indicate national team as defined under FIFA eligibility rules; some limited exceptions apply. Players may hold more than one non-FIFA nationality.

No.	Pos.	Nation	Player
—	MF	SVK	Michal Obročník (to FC ViOn Zlaté Moravce)
—	DF	SVK	Stanislav Morháč (to ŽP Šport Podbrezová)
—	MF	SVK	Martin Pribula (loan return to 1. FC Tatran Prešov)
—	FW	SVK	Emil Le Giang (loan return to MŠK Žilina)
—	FW	SVK	Gabriel Pisarík (loan return to Partizán Bardejov)
—	GK	SVK	Gejza Pulen (loan return to MFK Košice)
—	MF	SVK	Pavol Sedlák (to (Austria) SC Neusiedl am See 1919)

=== MFK Zemplín Michalovce ===
In: Note: Flags indicate national team as defined under FIFA eligibility rules; some limited exceptions apply. Players may hold more than one non-FIFA nationality.

No.	Pos.	Nation	Player
—	GK	SVK	Tomáš Jenčo (from MŠK Tesla Stropkov)
—	DF	SVK	Ján Čarnota (from MFK Dolný Kubín)
—	FW	SVK	Pavol Jurčo (from (Czech Republic) FK Viktoria Žižkov)
—	FW	SVK	Michal Hamuľák (on loan from MFK Vranov nad Topľou)
—	DF	SVK	Michal Vanák (loan return from FK Raven Považská Bystrica)
—	MF	FRA	Kevin Zonzon (loan return from FK Spišská Nová Ves)
—	MF	FRA	Kevin Garel (loan return from (France) US Ivry)
—	DF	ARG	Vernon de Marco (from (Spain) CD Constancia)
—	MF	ESP	Xesco (from (Spain) CD Montuïri)
—	FW	ESP	Manu (from (Spain) C.D. Cardassar)
—	MF	UKR	Leonid Shytov (from (Ukraine) FC Tytan Armyansk)
—	MF	SVK	Tomáš Sedlák (from (Hungary) Kaposvári Rákóczi FC)
—	MF	ESP	Marcos Calero (from (Spain) Villarreal CF U-19)
—	MF	BRA	Rafael Torres (on loan from 1. FC Tatran Prešov)

Out: Note: Flags indicate national team as defined under FIFA eligibility rules; some limited exceptions apply. Players may hold more than one non-FIFA nationality.

No.	Pos.	Nation	Player
—	FW	SVK	Róbert Rák (loan return to FC Nitra)
—	FW	SVK	Dušan Uškovič (loan return to FK Dukla Banská Bystrica)
—	DF	GAM	Ali Ceesay (loan return to MŠK Žilina)
—	MF	SVK	Michal Škvarka (loan return to MŠK Žilina)
—	MF	SVK	Pavol Ruskovský (to (Czech Republic) FC Tescoma Zlín)
—	MF	RSA	Waseem Isaacs (loan return to (South Africa) TBA)
—	DF	SVK	Radoslav Urban (loan return to 1. FC Tatran Prešov)
—	MF	SVK	Peter Jakubčo (on loan to 1. HFC Humenné)
—	FW	SVK	Oliver Špilár (on loan to 1. FC Tatran Prešov B)
—	DF	CZE	Jakub Hottek (Released)
—	MF	CZE	Josef Hořava (Released)
—	DF	CRO	Milan Krmpotić (Released)
—	DF	UKR	Leonid Shytov (Released)
—	FW	ESP	Manu (Released)
—	MF	FRA	Kevin Zonzon (Released)
—	MF	BRA	Rafael Torres (Released ane he returned to 1. FC Tatran Prešov)

=== MFK Dubnica ===
In: Note: Flags indicate national team as defined under FIFA eligibility rules; some limited exceptions apply. Players may hold more than one non-FIFA nationality.

No.	Pos.	Nation	Player
—	FW	SVK	Marek Svorada (on loan from (Czech Republic) 1. HFK Olomouc)
—	GK	SVK	Andrej Maťašovský (on loan from MFK Nová Dubnica)
—	MF	SVK	Matej Loduha (on loan from FK Púchov)

Out: Note: Flags indicate national team as defined under FIFA eligibility rules; some limited exceptions apply. Players may hold more than one non-FIFA nationality.

No.	Pos.	Nation	Player
—	GK	SVK	Pavol Bajza (to (Italy) Parma F.C.)
—	GK	SVK	Dušan Kolmokov (to FK Slovan Duslo Šaľa)
—	DF	SVK	Tomáš Mrva (to Spartak Myjava)
—	DF	SVK	Ľuboš Chmelík (loan return to FK Dukla Banská Bystrica)
—	FW	SVK	Michal Filo (loan return to FK Dukla Banská Bystrica)
—	MF	SVK	Patrik Abrahám (loan return to OŠK Stará Kremnička)
—	FW	SVK	Ján Varga (to FK Slovan Levice)
—	FW	SVK	Matej Gorelka (Released)
—	MF	SVK	Michal Živčic (Released)
—	DF	SVK	Ivan Múdry (Released)
—	MF	SVK	Matej Ižvolt (to (Poland) Piast Gliwice)

=== MFK Tatran Liptovský Mikuláš ===
In: Note: Flags indicate national team as defined under FIFA eligibility rules; some limited exceptions apply. Players may hold more than one non-FIFA nationality.

No.	Pos.	Nation	Player
—	DF	SVK	Michal Janec (on loan from MŠK Žilina)
—	DF	SVK	Martin Kubena (on loan from MŠK Žilina)
—	MF	SVK	Peter Ďungel (on loan from MŠK Žilina)
—	DF	SVK	Pavel Vrabec (on loan from ŽP Šport Podbrezová)
—	DF	SVK	Ján Mizerák (on loan from 1. FC Tatran Prešov)
—	FW	SVK	Marek Milan (from TJ Máj Ružomberok-Černová)
—	MF	SVK	Miroslav Daško (on loan from FK Poprad)
—	MF	SVK	Filip Legerský (loan return from ŠK Závažná Poruba)
—	MF	SVK	Vladimír Fuják (on loan from MŠK Žilina)
—	MF	SVK	Adam Morong (on loan from FK AS Trenčín)
—	FW	SVK	Tomáš Malec (on loan from FK AS Trenčín)

Out: Note: Flags indicate national team as defined under FIFA eligibility rules; some limited exceptions apply. Players may hold more than one non-FIFA nationality.

No.	Pos.	Nation	Player
—	GK	SVK	Ján Ďurčo (loan return to FK Dukla Banská Bystrica)
—	FW	SVK	Dominik Fotyik (loan return to MŠK Žilina)
—	MF	SVK	Ondřej Paděra (to (Austria) SV Sierndorf)
—	MF	MNE	Darko Bošković (to (Serbia) FK Proleter Novi Sad)
—	MF	SVK	Lukáš Kubus (loan return to FK Poprad)
—	MF	SVK	Vladimír Šlosár (loan return to FC Baník Horná Nitra)
—	FW	SVK	Martin Labaška (to (Austria) FK Hainburg)
—	DF	SVK	Tomáš Virgala (to ŠK Milénium Bardejovská Nová Ves)

=== FK Slovan Duslo Šaľa ===
In: Note: Flags indicate national team as defined under FIFA eligibility rules; some limited exceptions apply. Players may hold more than one non-FIFA nationality.

No.	Pos.	Nation	Player
—	GK	SVK	Dušan Kolmokov (from MFK Dubnica)
—	DF	SVK	Ján Čirik (loan return from FC Nitra)
—	MF	SVK	Daniel Rehák (from (Czech Republic) FK Fotbal Třinec)
—	FW	SVK	Róbert Gešnábel (on loan from MFK Topvar Topoľčany)
—	MF	SVK	Eduard Gajdoš (on loan from FC Nitra)
—	MF	SVK	Róbert Glenda (on loan from FC Nitra)
—	DF	SVK	Marián Ďatko (on loan from FC Nitra)
—	MF	SVK	Michal Jakubjak (on loan from FC Nitra)
—	FW	SVK	Ondrej Čurgali (on loan from FC Nitra)
—	MF	SVK	Márius Charizopulos (on loan from ČFK Nitra)

Out: Note: Flags indicate national team as defined under FIFA eligibility rules; some limited exceptions apply. Players may hold more than one non-FIFA nationality.

No.	Pos.	Nation	Player
—	DF	SVK	Michal Áč (loan return to FC Nitra)
—	FW	SVK	Marek Košút (End of professional-career, loan return to FC Nitra)
—	GK	SVK	Dávid Bartalos (to ŠK Lozorno)
—	FW	SVK	Csaba Takács (to TJ OFC Gabčíkovo)

=== Partizán Bardejov ===
In: Note: Flags indicate national team as defined under FIFA eligibility rules; some limited exceptions apply. Players may hold more than one non-FIFA nationality.

No.	Pos.	Nation	Player
—	FW	UKR	Maksym Stadnyk (on loan from FK Spišská Nová Ves)
—	MF	BRA	Dyjan (on loan from FK Bodva Moldava nad Bodvou)
—	FW	SVK	Marko Lukáč (on loan from ŽP Šport Podbrezová)
—	MF	SVK	Juraj Kuhajdík (from (Germany) TSG Maselheim-Sulmingen)
—	DF	SVK	Mario Macečko (on loan from ŠK Milénium Bardejovská Nová Ves)
—	MF	SVK	Ján Dzúrik (on loan from 1. FC Tatran Prešov)
—	MF	SVK	Ľubomír Ivanko-Macej (on loan from 1. FC Tatran Prešov)
—	MF	SVK	Martin Dupkala (on loan from 1. FC Tatran Prešov)

Out: Note: Flags indicate national team as defined under FIFA eligibility rules; some limited exceptions apply. Players may hold more than one non-FIFA nationality.

No.	Pos.	Nation	Player
—	MF	SVK	Blažej Vaščák (on loan to ŽP Šport Podbrezová)
—	DF	SVK	Michal Baka (loan return to 1. FC Tatran Prešov)
—	MF	SVK	Patrik Zajac (loan return to FK Slovan Duslo Šaľa)
—	FW	SVK	Róbert Tomko (loan return to FC ViOn Zlaté Moravce)
—	MF	SVK	Tomáš Zápotoka (Released)
—	FW	SVK	Peter Záhradník (Released)
—	MF	SVK	Erik Streňo (Released)
—	FW	UKR	Maksym Stadnyk (loan return to FK Spišská Nová Ves)

=== FC ŠTK 1914 Šamorín ===
In: Note: Flags indicate national team as defined under FIFA eligibility rules; some limited exceptions apply. Players may hold more than one non-FIFA nationality.

No.	Pos.	Nation	Player
—	MF	SVK	Balázs Borbély (on loan from (Cyprus) AEL Limassol)
—	GK	SVK	Peter Foťko (on loan from MFK Nová Baňa)
—	DF	SVK	Miroslav Sedlák (on loan from FK Senica)
—	FW	SVK	Tomáš Čermák (from FK ŠKP Inter Dúbravka Bratislava)
—	MF	POL	Konrad Gilewicz (from FC Wacker Innsbruck II)
—	FW	SVK	René Dedič (on loan from MŠK Žilina)
—	DF	GAM	Ali Ceesay (on loan from MŠK Žilina)
—	MF	SVK	Róbert Szegedi (on loan from (Czech Republic) FC Zbrojovka Brno)

Out: Note: Flags indicate national team as defined under FIFA eligibility rules; some limited exceptions apply. Players may hold more than one non-FIFA nationality.

No.	Pos.	Nation	Player
—	MF	SVK	Samuel Ďurech (loan return to 1. FC Tatran Prešov)
—	DF	SVK	Andrej Petrovský (loan return to FK Senica)
—	MF	SVK	Roman Frečka (loan return to FK Inter Bratislava)
—	DF	SVK	Gabriel Scholtz (loan return to ŽP Šport Podbrezová)
—	MF	SVK	Marek Kopúň (loan return to FK AS Trenčín)

=== FK Baník Ružiná ===
Note: Flags indicate national team as defined under FIFA eligibility rules; some limited exceptions apply. Players may hold more than one non-FIFA nationality.

No.	Pos.	Nation	Player
2	DF	SVK	Marián Ferenc (extended loan from ŽP Šport Podbrezová)
18	GK	SVK	Ján Slaniniak (on loan from Sklo Tatran Poltár)
5	DF	SVK	Ivan Hladík (on loan from FK Senica)
7	MF	SVK	Mário Marko (on loang from ŠK SFM Senec)
--	FW	SVK	Oliver Sabó (on loan from Sklo Tatran Poltár)
12	MF	SVK	Mário Ometák (on loan from FK Dukla Banská Bystrica)
10	DF	CZE	Aleš Urbánek (on loan from FK Senica)
17	MF	SVK	Lukáš Strelka (extended loan from FK Senica)
16	FW	SVK	Lukáš Blaščik (on loan from ŠK Cementáreň Lietavská Lúčka)
14	MF	SVK	Vladimír Takáč (on loan from TJ Družstevník Sklabiná)
6	MF	SVK	Július Chomistek (extended loan from FK Dukla Banská Bystrica)
9	MF	SVK	Martin Karásek (extended loan from ŽP Šport Podbrezová)
—	DF	SVK	Ján Štajer (from (Czech Republic) MFK Karviná)
—	DF	BRA	Dionathan (on loan from TJ Slovan Čeľadice)
—	GK	SVK	Mário Michalík (from FK LAFC Lučenec)
—	MF	SVK	Pavol Poliaček (on loan from MŠK Žilina)

Out: Note: Flags indicate national team as defined under FIFA eligibility rules; some limited exceptions apply. Players may hold more than one non-FIFA nationality.

No.	Pos.	Nation	Player
—	DF	SVK	Tomáš Libič (loan return to FK Dukla Banská Bystrica)
—	MF	SVK	Jozef Caban (loan return to MFK Banská Bystrica)
—	MF	SVK	Lukás Lupták (loan return to MFK Ružomberok)
—	MF	SVK	Róbert Jendrišek (to TBA)
—	FW	SVK	Martin Šimo (loan return to FC Baník Horná Nitra)
—	FW	SVK	Radoslav Máč (to Baník Kalinovo)
—	DF	SVK	Tomáš Peciar (loan return to FK AS Trenčín)
—	DF	SVK	Ján Vaculčiak (loan return to ŽP Šport Podbrezová)
—	GK	SVK	Gergely Varga (loan return to FTC Fiľakovo)

== See also ==
- 2012–13 Corgoň Liga
- 2012–13 2. liga
