= 2011–12 Slovak Cup =

2011–12 Slovnaft Cup
Slovnaft Cup

Tournament details
- Country: Slovakia
- Teams: 53

Final positions
- Champions: MŠK Žilina
- Runners-up: FK Senica

Tournament statistics
- Matches played: 52
- Goals scored: 138 (2.65 per match)
- Top goal scorer(s): Andrej Hodek (Zlaté Moravce), Tomáš Majtán (Žilina) (4 goals)

The 2011–12 Slovak Cup, also known as Slovnaft Cup for sponsorship reasons, was the 43rd edition of the competition. As in the previous year, 53 clubs have been part in the tournament.

The winners of the competition qualify for the second qualifying round of the 2012–13 UEFA Europa League.

== Participating teams ==
Corgoň Liga (12 teams)

- AS Trenčín
- DAC Dunajská Streda
- Dukla Banská Bystrica
- MFK Košice
- FC Nitra
- MFK Ružomberok
- FK Senica
- Slovan Bratislava
- Spartak Trnava
- 1. FC Tatran Prešov
- ViOn Zlaté Moravce
- MŠK Žilina

2. liga (12 teams)

- MFK Dubnica
- FC Petržalka 1898
- FK Moldava
- Tatran Liptovský Mikuláš
- SFM Senec
- Zemplín Michalovce
- MFK Dolný Kubín
- MŠK Rimavská Sobota
- Spartak Myjava
- Šport Podbrezová
- MFK Ružomberok B

3. liga (25 teams)

- Lokomotíva Zvolen (proceed without a fight)
- Odeva Lipany (not registered team)
- FK Spišská Nová Ves
- Lokomotíva Košice
- Goral Stará Ľubovňa
- Baník Ružiná (proceed without a fight)
- MFK Vranov nad Topľou (not registered team)
- Slavoj Trebišov (not registered team)
- Partizán Bardejov
- ŠK Kremnička
- FK Poprad
- OTJ Moravany
- PŠC Pezinok
- FK Slovan Duslo Šaľa
- OFK Dunajská Lužná
- Slovan Nemšová (proceed without a fight)
- Spartak Vráble (not registered team)
- ŠKF Sereď
- FKM Nové Zámky
- ŠTK Šamorín
- MFK Vrbové
- MFK Topoľčany
- FK Púchov
- AFC Nové Mesto nad Váhom
- Sokol Dolná Ždaňa

Majstrovstvá Regiónu (3 teams)

- Slovan Giraltovce (proceed without a fight)
- MFK Banská Bystrica
- FK Považská Bystrica

4. liga (1 teams)

- SFC Kalinkovo

== First round ==
| 23 August 2011 | SFC Kalinkovo | 0–4 | OTJ Moravany | Kalinkovo |
| | | Report | Gálik 19'; Varga 29', 70', 87' | Stadium: Štadión SFC Kalinkovo; Attendance: 200; Referee: Čmiko |

| 23 August 2011 | MFK Dubnica | 1–2 | MFK Vrbové | Dubnica |
| | Chmelík 84' | Report | Gažík 13'; Herceg 67' | Stadium: Mestský štadión Attendance: 150; Referee: Páchnik |

| 23 August 2011 | SFM Senec | 2–2 (4–5 p) | Spartak Myjava | Senec |
| | Mikulič 32'; Železník 63' | Report | Ulrich 11', 52' | Stadium: NTC Senec; Attendance: 550; Referee: Gábor |

| 23 August 2011 | FKM Nové Zámky | 0–3 | ŠTK Šamorín | Nové Zámky |
| | | Report | Hulínek 45'; Ležaić 62'; Ďurech 62' | Stadium: Štadión Nové Zámky; Attendance: 100; Referee: Debnár |

| 23 August 2011 | AFC Nové Mesto nad Váhom | 0–2 | Sokol Dolná Ždaňa | Nové Mesto nad Váhom |
| | | Report | Pinka 70'; Orolín 86' | Stadium: Areál AFC Považan; Attendance: 100; Referee: Mastiš |

| 23 August 2011 | MFK Dolný Kubín | 7–0 | Goral Stará Ľubovňa | Dolný Kubín |
| | Lejko 25', 49', 72'; Dolinajec 44', 76'; Siman 68', 84' | Report | | Stadium: Štadión MDUr. Ivana Chodáka; Attendance: 300; Referee: Ihring |

| 23 August 2011 | Šport Podbrezová | 0–0 (3–1 p) | FK Moldava | Brezno |
| | | Report | | Stadium: Štadión MŠK Brezno; Attendance: 400; Referee: Straka |

| 23 August 2011 | Partizán Bardejov | 1–1 (4–5 p) | LAFC Lučenec | Bardejov |
| | Cuprišin 71' | Report | Mižík 69' | Stadium: Mestský štadión Bardejov; Attendance: 700; Referee: Molitoris |

| 23 August 2011 | ŠK Kremnička | 1–0 | MŠK Rimavská Sobota | Banská Bystrica |
| | Ševčík 37' | Report | | Stadium: Štadión ŠK Kremnička; Attendance: 200; Referee: Mojsej |

| 23 August 2011 | FK Poprad | 1–0 | MFK Banská Bystrica | Poprad |
| | Rams 35' | Report | | Stadium: Futbalový štadión FK Poprad; Attendance: 250; Referee: Mriglot |

| 23 August 2011 | MFK Tatran Liptovský Mikuláš | 0–1 | MFK Zemplín Michalovce | Liptovský Mikuláš |
| | | Report | Ruskovský 24' | Stadium: Štadión Liptovský Mikuláš; Attendance: 220; Referee: Korista |

| 24 August 2011 | OFK Dunajská Lužná | 2–3 | FK Považská Bystrica | Dunajská Lužná |
| | Bician 18'; Vajdík 27' | Report | Šebík 33'; Oršula 68', 86' (pen.) | Stadium: Štadión OFK; Attendance: 250; Referee: Jánoš |

| 24 August 2011 | MFK Topoľčany | 0–1 | FK Púchov | Topoľčany |
| | | Report | Ľupták 87' | Stadium: Futbalový štadión Vojtecha Schotterta; Attendance: 205; Referee: Prešinský |

| 24 August 2011 | PŠC Pezinok | 1–0 | FK Slovan Duslo Šaľa | Pezinok |
| | Včelka 52' | Report | | Stadium: Štadión Pezinok; Attendance: 200; Referee: Ježík |

| 24 August 2011 | FC Petržalka 1898 | 5–0 | ŠKF Sereď | Bratislava |
| | Drobňák 4'; Schranz 29', 48', 70'; Luhový 73' | Report | | Stadium: Štadión Rapid; Attendance: 360; Referee: Michlian |

| 24 August 2011 | FK Spišská Nová Ves | 1–1 (4–2 p) | Lokomotíva Košice | Spišská Nová Ves |
| | Zlatohlavý 28' | Report | Chmelo 22' | Stadium: Štadión Spišská Nová Ves; Attendance: 300; Referee: Anguš |

== Second round ==
| 13 September 2011 | OTJ Moravany | 1–4 | ViOn Zlaté Moravce | Moravany nad Váhom |
| 16:30 | Gábor 88' | Report | Orávik 14', 65'; Brčák 20'; Hodek 53' | Stadium: Štadión v Moravanoch; Attendance: 120; Referee: Pavlík |

| 13 September 2011 | FK Púchov | 0–3 | Spartak Trnava | Púchov |
| 16:30 | | Report | Kaščák 44'; Koro Koné 51', 62' | Stadium: Mestský štadión Attendance: 1,350; Referee: Matúš |

| 13 September 2011 | FK Spišská Nová Ves | 0–5 | MŠK Žilina | Spišská Nová Ves |
| 16:30 | | Report | Střihavka 19' (pen.); Majtán 48', 60', 90'; Pich 84' | Stadium: Štadión Spišská Nová Ves; Attendance: 2,600; Referee: Sedlák |

| 13 September 2011 | Sokol Dolná Ždaňa | 2–2 (5–4 p) | MFK Ružomberok | Dolná Ždaňa |
| 16:30 | Orolín 35'; Pinka 64' | Report | Huber 22'; Krbeček 29' | Stadium: Štadión Dolná Ždaňa; Attendance: 1,112; Referee: Eperješi |

| 13 September 2011 | 1. FC Tatran Prešov | 2–0 | Šport Podbrezová | Prešov |
| 16:30 | Krob 17'; Bernardo 52' | Report | | Stadium: Štadión 1. FC Tatran Prešov; Attendance: 855; Referee: P. Hrčka |

| 13 September 2011 | MFK Zemplín Michalovce | 1–1 (3–4 p) | Dukla Banská Bystrica | Michalovce |
| 16:30 | Škvarka 26' | Report | Ľupták 19' | Stadium: Štadión MFK Zemplín; Attendance: 2,735; Referee: Chmura |

| 13 September 2011 | MFK Košice | 4–1 | MFK Dolný Kubín | Košice |
| 16:30 | Kuzma 23', 76'; Pačinda 33'; Diaby 53' | Report | Siman 62' (pen.) | Stadium: Štadión Lokomotívy v Čermeli; Attendance: 350; Referee: Horváth |

| 13 September 2011 | Lokomotíva Zvolen | 1–2 | FK Poprad | Zvolen |
| 16:30 | Paraj 58' | Report | Rusňák 21'; Kočiš 53' | Stadium: Mestký štadión Attendance: 150; Referee: R. Weiss |

| 14 September 2011 | DAC Dunajská Streda | 0–1 | Spartak Myjava | Dunajská Streda |
| 16:30 | | Report | Bruško 65' | Stadium: Mestský štadión Attendance: 450; Referee: Hracho |

| 14 September 2011 | FK Považská Bystrica | 1–2 | FK Senica | Považská Bystrica |
| 16:30 | Perexta 33' | Report | Kroupa 50'; Kroupa 80' | Stadium: Štadión FK Raven Považská Bystrica; Attendance: 1,000; Referee: Vnuk |

| 14 September 2011 | FC Petržalka 1898 | 0–3 | AS Trenčín | Bratislava |
| 16:30 | | Report | Čögley 37'; Depetris 43'; Hlohovský 81' | Stadium: Štadión Rapid; Attendance: 360; Referee: Prešinský |

| 14 September 2011 | Slovan Nemšová | 2–0 | ŠTK Šamorín | Nemšová |
| 16:30 | Holiš 18'; Ďuriš 60' | Report | | Stadium: Štadión Nemšová; Attendance: 200; Referee: Špaček |

| 14 September 2011 | Lučenec | 4–0 | ŠK Kremnička | Lučenec |
| 16:30 | Kulík 10'; Mykola 55'; Beňo 84'; Lukáč 89' | Report | | Stadium: Mestský štadión Attendance: 370; Referee: Leško |

| 21 September 2011 | PŠC Pezinok | 0–1 | Slovan Bratislava | Pezinok |
| 16:30 | | Report | Šebo 39' | Stadium: Štadión Pezinok; Attendance: 1,710; Referee: Ježík |

| 21 September 2011 | MFK Vrbové | 0–3 | FC Nitra | Vrbové |
| 16:30 | | Report | Hodúr 40'; Šimonek 78', 82' | Stadium: Štadión Vrbové; Attendance: 256; Referee: Kráľovič |

| Baník Ružiná | w/o | Slovan Giraltovce | Ružiná |
| | | | Stadium: Štadión Ružiná |

== Third round ==
| 27 September 2011 | FK Poprad | 0–0 (3–4 p) | MŠK Žilina | Poprad |
| 16:30 | | Report | | Stadium: Futbalový štadión FK Poprad; Attendance: 1,780; Referee: Jaška |
| | Penalties |
| | Kočiš (penalty missed); Rams (penalty scored); Ondruš (penalty missed); Dulovič (penalty scored); Pitoňák (penalty scored) | | (penalty scored) Zošák; (penalty scored) Mráz; (penalty scored) Barčík; (penalty missed) Pich; (penalty scored) Ondráš |

| 27 September 2011 | Sokol Dolná Ždaňa | 0–2 | Dukla Banská Bystrica | Dolná Ždaňa |
| 16:30 | | Report | Laksík 51'; Rejdovian 67' | Stadium: Štadión Dolná Ždaňa; Attendance: 1,469; Referee: Vlk |

| 27 September 2011 | Baník Ružiná | 0–3 | FK Senica | Ružiná |
| 16:30 | | Report | Hošek 21'; Pavlík 33'; Diviš 55' | Stadium: Štadión Ružiná; Attendance: 1,100; Referee: Smolák |

| 27 September 2011 | MFK Košice | 2–1 | FC Nitra | Košice |
| 16:30 | Pačinda 12' (pen.); Čirik 88' (o.g.) | Report | Sloboda 63' | Stadium: Lokomotíva Stadium; Attendance: 540; Referee: Pavlík |

| 27 September 2011 | ViOn Zlaté Moravce | 3–0 | Spartak Myjava | Zlaté Moravce |
| 16:30 | Paur 45'; Pavlovič 78'; Hodek 88' | Report | | Stadium: Štadión FC ViOn; Attendance: 686; Referee: Trutz |

| 28 September 2011 | Tatran Prešov | 4–0 | LAFC Lučenec | Prešov |
| 16:30 | Bernardo 22'; Adam 23'; Kolbas 63'; Žůrek 73' | Report | | Stadium: Štadión 1. FC Tatran Prešov; Attendance: 451; Referee: Valášek |

| 5 October 2011 | FKS Nemšová | 0–2 | Spartak Trnava | Nemšová |
| 15:30 | | Report | Tomaček 19'; Gogolák 73' | Stadium: Štadión Nemšová; Attendance: 600; Referee: Fajčík |

| 26 October 2011 | AS Trenčín | 1–1 (2–4 p) | Slovan Bratislava | Trenčín |
| 17:30 | Salinas 61' | Report | Halenár 76' | Stadium: Štadión na Sihoti; Attendance: 1,605; Referee: Samotný |
| | Penalties |
| | Hlohovský (penalty scored); Peltier (penalty missed); Depetris (penalty scored); Holúbek (penalty missed) | | (penalty missed) Halenár; (penalty scored) Žofčák; (penalty scored) Kladrubský; (penalty scored) Lačný; (penalty scored) Táborský |

== Quarter-finals ==
=== First legs ===
| 18 October 2011 | MFK Košice | 2–2 | ViOn Zlaté Moravce | Košice |
| 15:30 | Karaš 21'; Diaby 33' | Report | Farkaš 10'; Hodek 71' | Stadium: Lokomotíva Stadium; Attendance: 350; Referee: Matúš |

| 18 October 2011 | MŠK Žilina | 2–1 | Tatran Prešov | Žilina |
| 17:30 | Mráz 60' (pen.); Deza 75' | Report | Macko 8' | Stadium: Stadium Pod Dubňom; Attendance: 714; Referee: Hracho |

| 18 October 2011 | Spartak Trnava | 1–2 | Dukla Banská Bystrica | Trnava |
| 17:30 | Koro Koné 59' | Report | Jakubko 15'; Uškovič 48' | Stadium: Štadión Antona Malatinského; Attendance: 1,012; Referee: Trutz |

| 7 March 2012 | FK Senica | 2–0 | Slovan Bratislava | Senica |
| 17:30 | Gajdošík 55'; Diviš 85' | Report | | Stadium: Štadión FK Senica; Attendance: 1,314; Referee: Kráľovič |

=== Second legs ===
| 25 October 2011 | ViOn Zlaté Moravce | 1–0 (3–2 agg.) | MFK Košice | Zlaté Moravce |
| 16:00 | Brčák 62' | Report | | Stadium: Štadión FC ViOn; Attendance: 422; Referee: Kráľovič |

| 1 November 2011 | Tatran Prešov | 2–1 (a.e.t.) (3–3 agg.) (4–5 p) | MŠK Žilina | Prešov |
| 14:00 | Krajník 45'; Guba 72' | Report | Ceesay 57' | Stadium: Štadión 1. FC Tatran Prešov; Attendance: 1,451; Referee: Ježík |
| | Penalties |
| | Adam (penalty scored); Kolbas (penalty missed); Petráš (penalty scored); Piter-Bučko (penalty scored); Krob (penalty scored) | | (penalty scored) Střihavka; (penalty scored) Mráz; (penalty scored) Barčík; (penalty scored) Kerla; (penalty scored) Mabouka |

| 1 November 2011 | Dukla Banská Bystrica | 1–1 (3–2 agg.) | Spartak Trnava | Banská Bystrica |
| 17:00 | Považanec 22' | Report | Petráš 21' | Stadium: Štadión SNP Štiavničky; Attendance: 1,410; Referee: Prešinský |

| 21 March 2012 | Slovan Bratislava | 2–0 (a.e.t.) (2–2 agg.) (2–4 p) | FK Senica | Bratislava |
| 17:30 | Halenár 83'; Milinković 89' | Report (in Slovak) | | Stadium: Štadión Pasienky; Attendance: 1,450; Referee: Vladimír Vnuk |
| | Penalties |
| | Halenár (penalty missed); Grendel (penalty scored); Piliyev (penalty missed); Smetana (penalty scored) | | (penalty scored) Gorosito; (penalty scored) Štepanovský; (penalty scored) Blackburn; (penalty missed) Leal; (penalty scored) Wijlaars |

== Semi-finals ==
=== First legs ===
| 17 April 2012 | MŠK Žilina | 1–0 | Dukla Banská Bystrica | Žilina |
| 17:00 | Akakpo 47' | Report | | Stadium: Stadium Pod Dubňom; Attendance: 1,824; Referee: Jozef Pavlík |

| 17 April 2012 | ViOn Zlaté Moravce | 1–1 | FK Senica | Zlaté Moravce |
| 17:00 | Hodek 57' | Report | Strnad 85' | Stadium: Štadión FC ViOn; Attendance: 960; Referee: Michal Smolák |

=== Second legs ===
| 24 April 2012 | Dukla Banská Bystrica | 0–0 (0–1 agg.) | MŠK Žilina | Banská Bystrica |
| 17:00 | | Report | | Stadium: Štadión SNP Štiavničky; Attendance: 2,210; Referee: Miroslav Fajčík |

| 24 April 2012 | FK Senica | 3–0 (3–0 agg.) | ViOn Zlaté Moravce | Senica |
| 17:00 | Kóňa 10'; Blackburn 58', 72' | Report | | Stadium: Štadión FK Senica; Attendance: 1,016; Referee: Roman Matúš |

== Final ==
8 May 2012
12:30 CEST

| Senica | 2–3 (a.e.t.) | Žilina |
|---|---|---|
| Kóňa 11', 73' | Report | Majtán 7'; Barčík 49'; Deza 104' |

Mestský štadión Bardejov, Bardejov
Attendance: 3,000
Referee: Ľubomír Samotný
