= List of Slovak football transfers winter 2011–12 =

This is a list of Slovak football transfers in the winter transfer window 2011–12 by club. Only transfers of the First League are included.

== Slovak First League ==
=== 1. FC Tatran Prešov ===
In: Note: Flags indicate national team as defined under FIFA eligibility rules; some limited exceptions apply. Players may hold more than one non-FIFA nationality.

No.	Pos.	Nation	Player
25	FW	ARM	Narek Beglaryan (from FC Mika)
26	MF	SVK	Štefan Zošák (on loan from MŠK Žilina)
--	FW	SVK	Jozef Dolný (loan return from MFK Zemplín Michalovce)
--	MF	SVK	Peter Katona (renewed contract)
--	FW	CZE	David Střihavka (on loan from MŠK Žilina)
--	DF	SVK	Lukáš Štetina (on loan from FC Metalist Kharkiv)
--	FW	UKR	Anton Lysyuk (from Qizilqum Zarafshon)
--	FW	UKR	Andriy Yakovlev (from Nasaf Qarshi)

Out: Note: Flags indicate national team as defined under FIFA eligibility rules; some limited exceptions apply. Players may hold more than one non-FIFA nationality.

No.	Pos.	Nation	Player
--	FW	SVK	Róbert Zeher (released)
--	MF	SVK	Peter Katona (released)
--	MF	SVK	Martin Pribula (released on loan to MŠK Rimavská Sobota)
--	MF	SVK	Pavol Baláž (released)
--	FW	CZE	Libor Žůrek (released)
--	FW	BRA	Bernardo (on loan to 1. FK Příbram)
--	FW	BRA	Higor Coimbra (?)

=== AS Trenčín ===
In: Note: Flags indicate national team as defined under FIFA eligibility rules; some limited exceptions apply. Players may hold more than one non-FIFA nationality.

No.	Pos.	Nation	Player
--	DF	BIH	Mirko Radovanović (from Željezničar)
--	MF	ARG	Iván Díaz (from Panathinaikos)
--	FW	SVK	Peter Štyvar (from Fotbal Třinec)

Out: Note: Flags indicate national team as defined under FIFA eligibility rules; some limited exceptions apply. Players may hold more than one non-FIFA nationality.

No.	Pos.	Nation	Player
--	MF	SVK	Lukáš Ďuriška (on loan to AGOVV Apeldoorn)
--	MF	SVK	Karol Mondek (on loan to AGOVV Apeldoorn)
--	DF	SVK	Roland Szabó (on loan to AFC Nové Mesto nad Váhom)
--	DF	SVK	Peter Valla (on loan to PFK Piešťany)

=== FC Nitra ===
In: Note: Flags indicate national team as defined under FIFA eligibility rules; some limited exceptions apply. Players may hold more than one non-FIFA nationality.

No.	Pos.	Nation	Player
--	FW	CZE	Karel Kroupa (from FK Senica)
--	GK	SVK	Lukáš Hroššo (loan return from Slovan Bratislava)
--	MF	BRA	Cleber (from Brazil)
--	DF	CZE	Ondřej Murín (on loan from Sigma Olomouc)
--	MF	GUI	Seydouba Soumah (from University of Pretoria)

Out: Note: Flags indicate national team as defined under FIFA eligibility rules; some limited exceptions apply. Players may hold more than one non-FIFA nationality.

No.	Pos.	Nation	Player
--	MF	SVK	Ivan Hodúr (to Zagłębie Lubin)
--	FW	SVK	Róbert Rák (on loan to MFK Zemplín Michalovce)
--	FW	SVK	Roman Sloboda (released)
--	MF	SVK	Lukáš Zelenický (on loan to PFK Piešťany)

=== FC Spartak Trnava ===
In: Note: Flags indicate national team as defined under FIFA eligibility rules; some limited exceptions apply. Players may hold more than one non-FIFA nationality.

No.	Pos.	Nation	Player
--	DF	CZE	Martin Švec (from FC Petržalka 1898)
--	FW	SVK	Ivan Schranz (from FC Petržalka 1898)
--	MF	SVK	Peter Kuračka (from FC ViOn Zlaté Moravce)
--	FW	SVK	Karol Pavelka (from FC ViOn Zlaté Moravce)
--	MF	SVK	Michal Gašparík (on loan from Górnik Zabrze)
--	DF	CZE	Josef Kaufman (from SK Slavia Prague)
--	FW	MKD	Riste Naumov (from SK Slavia Prague)

Out: Note: Flags indicate national team as defined under FIFA eligibility rules; some limited exceptions apply. Players may hold more than one non-FIFA nationality.

No.	Pos.	Nation	Player
--	FW	SVK	Ľubomír Bernáth (to FC ViOn Zlaté Moravce)
--	FW	CIV	Koro Koné (to Dijon FCO)
--	DF	GUI	Boubacar Diallo (released)
--	GK	SVK	Ján Slovenčiak (released)
--	FW	MKD	Riste Naumov (released)
--	DF	CZE	Pavel Malcharek (released)
--	FW	SVK	Tomáš Oravec (free agent)
--	MF	SVK	Ján Petráš (on loan to TJ Spartak Myjava)
--	FW	SVK	Ľubomír Gogolák (on loan to ŠK SFM Senec)
--	GK	SVK	Matej Székely (on loan to OTJ Moravany nad Váhom)

=== FC ViOn Zlaté Moravce ===
In: Note: Flags indicate national team as defined under FIFA eligibility rules; some limited exceptions apply. Players may hold more than one non-FIFA nationality.

No.	Pos.	Nation	Player
--	MF	SVK	Martin Luhový (from FC Petržalka 1898)
--	FW	SVK	Ľubomír Bernáth (from Spartak Trnava)
--	DF	SVK	Martin Husár (from Zbrojovka Brno)
--	DF	SVK	Juraj Pilát (from FK Púchov)

Out: Note: Flags indicate national team as defined under FIFA eligibility rules; some limited exceptions apply. Players may hold more than one non-FIFA nationality.

No.	Pos.	Nation	Player
--	MF	SVK	Peter Kuračka (to Spartak Trnava)
--	FW	SVK	Karol Pavelka (to Spartak Trnava)
--	DF	SVK	Marek Janečka (to Hansa Rostock)

=== FK DAC 1904 Dunajská Streda ===
In: Note: Flags indicate national team as defined under FIFA eligibility rules; some limited exceptions apply. Players may hold more than one non-FIFA nationality.

No.	Pos.	Nation	Player
--	FW	BIH	Krešimir Kordić (on loan from Slovan Bratislava)
--	MF	SVK	Andrej Hanták (from LAFC Lučenec)
--	GK	CZE	Pavel Kučera (on loan from České Budějovice)
--	MF	GAB	Arsène Copa (from Győr)
--	DF	CMR	Alain Kotto (from Cintra Yaoundé)
--	DF	CMR	Adiaba Bondoa (on loan from Sparta Prague)
--	DF	CZE	Aleš Urbánek (free agent)
--	FW	CMR	Joël Tchami (from Hanoi F.C.)
--	DF	BIH	Staniša Nikolić (from Sloboda Tuzla)
--	DF	BIH	Ilija Prodanović (from Zvijezda)
--	DF	CZE	Tomáš Huber (free agent)
--	MF	SVK	Ján Hözl (from Lučenec)
--	MF	SVK	Branislav Fodrek (from Haladás)

Out: Note: Flags indicate national team as defined under FIFA eligibility rules; some limited exceptions apply. Players may hold more than one non-FIFA nationality.

No.	Pos.	Nation	Player
--	DF	SVK	Igor Obert (to FC Vysočina Jihlava)
--	GK	SVK	Pavel Kováč (loan return to MFK Dubnica)
--	FW	SVK	Marián Tomčák (to SC Neusiedl am See 1919)
--	FW	CZE	Jan Kadlec (loan return to Sparta Prague)
--	DF	SVK	Roman Konečný (free agent)
--	MF	SVK	Jaroslav Hílek (to FK Viktoria Žižkov)
--	MF	CZE	David Helísek (to FC Vysočina Jihlava)
--	FW	SVK	Zoltán Harsányi (to Pécsi MFC)
--	DF	SVK	Peter Struhár (to Kapfenberger SV)
--	DF	SVK	Ján Štajer (loan return to MFK Karviná)
--	MF	BIH	Josip Čorić (to Red Bull Salzburg Juniors)

=== FK Dukla Banská Bystrica ===
In: Note: Flags indicate national team as defined under FIFA eligibility rules; some limited exceptions apply. Players may hold more than one non-FIFA nationality.

No.	Pos.	Nation	Player
--	MF	SVK	Radoslav Augustín (on loan from Slovan Bratislava)
--	FW	SVK	Marek Kuzma (on loan from Slovan Bratislava)
--	FW	SVK	Martin Matúš (from FK REaMOS Kysucký Lieskovec)

Out: Note: Flags indicate national team as defined under FIFA eligibility rules; some limited exceptions apply. Players may hold more than one non-FIFA nationality.

No.	Pos.	Nation	Player
--	FW	SVK	Martin Jakubko (to Amkar Perm)
--	FW	SVK	Dušan Uškovič (to MFK Ružomberok)
--	GK	SVK	Ján Ďurčo (on loan to MFK Tatran Liptovský Mikuláš)
--	MF	SVK	Jaroslav Prekop (free agent)
--	FW	SVK	Dušan Uškovič (on loan to MFK Zemplín Michalovce)

=== FK Senica ===
In: Note: Flags indicate national team as defined under FIFA eligibility rules; some limited exceptions apply. Players may hold more than one non-FIFA nationality.

No.	Pos.	Nation	Player
--	FW	PAN	Rolando Blackburn (on loan from Chorrillo F.C.)
--	GK	SVK	Ján Malec (from TJ Baník Hôrka)
--	DF	SVK	Peter Štepanovský (on loan from Slovan Bratislava)
--	MF	CZE	Jaroslav Černý (from MKE Ankaragücü)
--	FW	CIV	Lamine Diarrassouba (from Nîmes Olympique)
--	DF	SVK	Marián Štrbák (on loan from FK Spartak Bánovce nad Bebravou)

Out: Note: Flags indicate national team as defined under FIFA eligibility rules; some limited exceptions apply. Players may hold more than one non-FIFA nationality.

No.	Pos.	Nation	Player
--	GK	SVK	Michal Šulla (on loan to MFK Vrbové)
--	MF	RSA	Bridget Motha (loan return to FC Cape Town)
--	FW	CZE	Karel Kroupa (to FC Nitra)
--	MF	CZE	Jiří Valenta (loan return to FK Baumit Jablonec)
--	DF	CZE	Petr Šíma (loan return to SK Dynamo České Budějovice)
--	MF	BRA	Kaká (released)
--	FW	SVK	Juraj Piroska (to ŠK Slovan Bratislava)

=== MFK Košice ===
In: Note: Flags indicate national team as defined under FIFA eligibility rules; some limited exceptions apply. Players may hold more than one non-FIFA nationality.

No.	Pos.	Nation	Player
--	DF	MKD	Shaqir Rexhepi (from Al-Taawon FC)
--	DF	ESP	Stefan Milojević (from FK Teleoptik)

Out: Note: Flags indicate national team as defined under FIFA eligibility rules; some limited exceptions apply. Players may hold more than one non-FIFA nationality.

No.	Pos.	Nation	Player
--	FW	SVK	Ján Novák (to MŠK Žilina)
--	DF	SVK	Matúš Čonka (to Slavia Prague)
--	FW	SVK	Pavol Jurčo (free agent)
--	DF	SVK	Lukáš Džogan (on loan to Lokomotíva Košice)
--	DF	SVK	Vladimír Kražel (on loan to FK Moldava)

=== MFK Ružomberok ===
In: Note: Flags indicate national team as defined under FIFA eligibility rules; some limited exceptions apply. Players may hold more than one non-FIFA nationality.

No.	Pos.	Nation	Player
--	MF	SVK	Miroslav Poliaček (from 1. FC Slovácko)
--	GK	CZE	Lukáš Zich (from Sparta Prague)
--	MF	SVK	Richard Lásik (on loan from Brescia Calcio)
--	FW	SVK	Dušan Uškovič (from FK Dukla Banská Bystrica)
--	FW	KEN	Patrick Oboya (from FK Baník Most)
--	DF	SVK	Martin Nosek (on loan from MFK Dubnica)
--	FW	SRB	Miroslav Marković (on loan from FK Dukla Prague)

Out: Note: Flags indicate national team as defined under FIFA eligibility rules; some limited exceptions apply. Players may hold more than one non-FIFA nationality.

No.	Pos.	Nation	Player
--	MF	SVK	Anton Sloboda (free agent)
--	MF	CZE	David Šmahaj (released)
--	FW	CZE	Tomáš Krbeček (released)
--	DF	CZE	Tomáš Huber (released)
--	DF	SRB	Milomir Sivčević (released)
--	FW	SVK	Dušan Uškovič (released)

=== MŠK Žilina ===
In: Note: Flags indicate national team as defined under FIFA eligibility rules; some limited exceptions apply. Players may hold more than one non-FIFA nationality.

No.	Pos.	Nation	Player
--	FW	SVK	Ján Novák (from MFK Košice)
--	DF	TOG	Serge Akakpo (from NK Celje)
--	DF	POR	Ricardo Nunes (from Portimonense S.C.)

Out: Note: Flags indicate national team as defined under FIFA eligibility rules; some limited exceptions apply. Players may hold more than one non-FIFA nationality.

No.	Pos.	Nation	Player
--	DF	SVK	Patrik Mráz (to Śląsk Wrocław)
--	MF	SVK	Štefan Zošák (on loan to 1. FC Tatran Prešov)
--	MF	SVK	Zdeno Štrba (released)
--	MF	SRB	Nemanja Zlatković (released)
--	FW	CZE	David Střihavka (on loan to 1. FC Tatran Prešov)

=== ŠK Slovan Bratislava ===
In: Note: Flags indicate national team as defined under FIFA eligibility rules; some limited exceptions apply. Players may hold more than one non-FIFA nationality.

No.	Pos.	Nation	Player
--	FW	CZE	Ondřej Smetana (on loan from K. Sint-Truidense V.V.)
--	MF	SVK	Kamil Kopúnek (from A.S. Bari)
--	DF	SVK	Mário Pečalka (on loan from Hapoel Tel Aviv F.C.)
--	FW	SVK	Ákos Szarka (loan return from ŠK SFM Senec)
--	FW	SVK	Juraj Piroska (from FK Senica)
--	MF	RUS	Nika Piliyev (on loan from PFC CSKA Moscow)
--	GK	SVK	Pavel Kováč (on loan from MFK Dubnica)
--	DF	SVK	Roman Konečný (from free agent)

Out: Note: Flags indicate national team as defined under FIFA eligibility rules; some limited exceptions apply. Players may hold more than one non-FIFA nationality.

No.	Pos.	Nation	Player
--	MF	SVK	Radoslav Augustín (on loan to FK Dukla Banská Bystrica)
--	FW	SVK	Marek Kuzma (on loan to FK Dukla Banská Bystrica)
--	MF	SVK	Karim Guédé (to SC Freiburg)
--	FW	SVK	Milan Ivana (on loan to SV Wehen Wiesbaden)
--	DF	SVK	Peter Štepanovský (on loan to FK Senica)
--	GK	SVK	Lukáš Hroššo (loan return to FC Nitra)
--	MF	CZE	Ivo Táborský (loan return to FK Mladá Boleslav)
--	FW	CZE	Lukáš Hartig (loan return to Bohemians 1905)
--	MF	BRA	Zé Vitor (return from loan São Paulo FC)
--	FW	SVK	Miloš Lačný (loan return to Sparta Prague)
--	FW	BIH	Krešimir Kordić (on loan to FK DAC 1904 Dunajská Streda)
--	DF	CZE	Radek Dosoudil (released)

== See also ==
- 2011-12 Slovak First League
