= 2009–10 Slovak Cup =

Tournament details
- Country: Slovakia
- Teams: 48

Final positions
- Champions: Slovan Bratislava
- Runners-up: Spartak Trnava

The 2009–10 Slovak Cup was the 41st season of Slovakia's annual knock-out cup competition and the seventeenth since the independence of Slovakia. It began on 5 August 2009 with the matches of first round and ended on 11 May 2010 with the final. The winners of the competition earned a place in the third qualifying round of the UEFA Europa League. Košice were the defending champions.

== First round ==
The games were played on 5 August 2009.

Team 1	Score	Team 2
FC Ružinov Bratislava	0–3	FK Rača
AFC Nové Mesto nad Váhom	1–1 (a.e.t.), (5–3 p)	FK Spartak Vráble
FK Slovan Nemšová	0–0 (a.e.t.), (3–5 p)	OTJ Moravany nad Váhom
MFK Topvar Topolcany	2–3	FC ViOn Zlaté Moravce
FKM Nové Zámky	0–1	HFK Prievidza
ŠKF Sereď	1–1 (a.e.t.), (6–5 p)	FK Púchov
MFK Vrbové	2–0	FK Slovan Duslo Šaľa
ŠK Blava Jaslovské Bohunice	0–0 (a.e.t.), (3–4 p)	TJ Spartak Myjava
ŠK Bernolákovo	1–3	FK AS Trenčín
FK Dolná Ždaňa	2–2 (a.e.t.), (5–6 p)	MŠK Rimavská Sobota
FK Poprad	0–3 (w/o)	1. HFC Humenné
FK Slavoj Trebišov	0–2	ŽP ŠPORT Podbrezová
MFK Snina	4–2	ŠK Odeva Lipany
MFK Goral Stará Ľubovňa	0–3	FK LAFC Lučenec
MFK Tatran NAO Liptovský Mikuláš	1–0	MFK Dolný Kubín
MFK Lokomotíva Zvolen	0–0 (a.e.t.), (2–4 p)	MFK Banská Bystrica
MFK Vranov nad Topľou	3–5	FK Bodva Moldava nad Bodvou
FK Spišská Nová Ves	1–1 (a.e.t.), (4–2 p)	FK Zemplín Michalovce

== Second round ==
The games were played on 22/23 September 2009.

Team 1	Score	Team 2
MFK Snina	0–3	MFK Košice
MŠK Žilina	3–0 (w/o)	ŽP ŠPORT Podbrezová
FK Spišská Nová Ves	1–0	MFK Dubnica
MFK Banská Bystrica	1–3	MFK Ružomberok
1. FC Tatran Prešov	5–0	FK LAFC Lučenec
FK Čadca	0–1	FK Dukla Banská Bystrica
1. HFC Humenné	1–2	FK Bodva Moldava nad Bodvou
MŠK Rimavská Sobota	3–1	MFK Tatran NAO Liptovský Mikuláš
MFK Vrbové	0–7	ŠK Slovan Bratislava
FC Nitra	5–0	FK Mesto Prievidza
AFC Nové Mesto nad Váhom	1–6	FC Artmedia Petržalka
TJ Spartak Myjava	0–0 (a.e.t.), (7–6 p)	FK Senica
FC Spartak Trnava	5–0	FK Rača
ŠK SFM Senec	1–1 (a.e.t.), (2–4 p)	DAC 1904 Dunajská Streda
ŠKF Sereď	1–4	FC ViOn Zlaté Moravce
OTJ Moravany nad Váhom	0–3	FK AS Trenčín

== Third round ==
The games were played on 20/21 October 2009.

Team 1	Score	Team 2
FK Dukla Banská Bystrica	1–0	FC Nitra
DAC 1904 Dunajská Streda	1–0	1. FC Tatran Prešov
FC Spartak Trnava	5–0	FC ViOn Zlaté Moravce
FC Artmedia Petržalka	4–0	FK AS Trenčín
TJ Spartak Myjava	2–1	MFK Ružomberok
FK Bodva Moldava nad Bodvou	1–0	FK Spišská Nová Ves
MŠK Žilina	1–2	MFK Košice
ŠK Slovan Bratislava	2–1	MŠK Rimavská Sobota

== Quarter-finals ==
The first legs were played on 3/4 November 2009. The second legs were played on 24/25 November 2009.

=== First legs ===
3 November 2009	MFK Petržalka	3–2	Spartak Trnava	Bratislava
13:30	Majtán 70'; Hodek 77'; Ďurica 87'	Report	Doležaj 20'; Kopúnek 37'	Stadium: Štadión ŠKP Dúbravka; Attendance: 447; Referee: Ľubomír Samotný

3 November 2009	DAC Dunajská Streda	3–0	Bodva Moldava nad Bodvou	Dunajská Streda
18:00	Koejoe 38' (pen.), 57'; N'Kendo 83'	Report		Stadium: Mestský štadión Attendance: 1,998; Referee: Michal Smolák

4 November 2009	Spartak Myjava	0–3	Slovan Bratislava	Myjava
13:30		Report	Halenár 42'; Masaryk 60'; Dobrotka 63'	Stadium: Stadium Myjava; Attendance: 1,850; Referee: Peter Kráľovič

4 November 2009	MFK Košice	0–2	Banská Bystrica	Košice
16:30		Report	Pleva 20'; Poljovka 27' (pen.)	Stadium: Štadión Lokomotívy; Attendance: 394; Referee: Kamil Horváth

=== Second legs ===
24 November 2009	Banská Bystrica	1–0 (3–0 agg.)	MFK Košice	Banská Bystrica
16:30	Snitka 29'	Report		Stadium: Štadión SNP; Attendance: 1,120; Referee: Gabriel Michlian

24 November 2009	Bodva Moldava nad Bodvou	1–3 (1–6 agg.)	DAC Dunajská Streda	Moldava nad Bodvou
17:00	Pelegrin 62'	Report	Seelaus 49'; Bognár 67'; N'Kendo 70'	Stadium: Štadión Bodvy; Attendance: 1,500; Referee: Vladimír Hracho

25 November 2009	Spartak Trnava	3–0 (5–3 agg.)	MFK Petržalka	Trnava
16:30	Doležaj 40' (pen.); Koné 83', 87'	Report		Stadium: Anton Malatinský Stadium; Attendance: 2,742; Referee: Pavol Chmura

25 November 2009	Slovan Bratislava	0–0 (3–0 agg.)	Spartak Myjava	Bratislava
17:30		Report		Stadium: Tehelné pole Attendance: 450; Referee: Ladislav Prešinský

== Semi-finals ==
The first legs were played on 6 April 2010. The second legs were played on 20 April 2010.

=== First legs ===
6 April 2010	Banská Bystrica	0–1	Slovan Bratislava	Banská Bystrica
16:30		Report	Kuzma 2'	Stadium: Štadión SNP; Attendance: 1,880; Referee: Vladimír Hracho

6 April 2010	DAC Dunajská Streda	0–1	Spartak Trnava	Dunajská Streda
18:00		Report	Hanzel 40'	Stadium: Mestský štadión Attendance: 1,985; Referee: Kamil Horváth

=== Second legs ===
20 April 2010	Slovan Bratislava	1–0 (2–0 agg.)	Banská Bystrica	Bratislava
17:30	Ivana 40'	Report		Stadium: Štadión Pasienky; Attendance: 1,362; Referee: Mário Vlk

20 April 2010	Spartak Trnava	2–0 (3–0 agg.)	DAC Dunajská Streda	Trnava
17:00	Bernáth 88'; Juhász 90'	Report		Stadium: Anton Malatinský Stadium; Attendance: 1,342; Referee: Jozef Pavlík

== Final ==
11 May 2010
16:30 CEST

Spartak Trnava	0–6	Slovan Bratislava
	Report	Saláta 11'; Božić 17'; Sylvestr 33'; Breznaník 64'; Guédé 67'; Dobrotka 87'

Zemplin Stadium, Michalovce
Attendance: 3,752
Referee: Mário Vlk
