= Szegedi =

Szegedi is a surname. Notable people with the surname include:

- Csanád Szegedi (born 1982), Hungarian politician
- István Szegedi-Szüts (1893–1959), Hungarian painter and illustrator
- Orsolya Szegedi (born 1989), Hungarian handballer
- Róbert Szegedi (born 1985), Slovak football player
