= Luhový =

Luhový (feminine: Luhová) is a Slovak surname. Notable people with the surname include:

- Ľubomír Luhový (born 1967), Slovak footballer and manager
- Martin Luhový (born 1985), Slovak footballer
- Milan Luhový (born 1963), Slovak footballer
