= Martin Švec =

Martin Švec may refer to:

- Martin Švec (squash player) (born 1994) Czech squash player
- Martin Švec (footballer) (born 1984), Czech football defender
