= Pavol Orolín =

Slovak footballer

Personal information
- Full name: Pavol Orolín
- Date of birth: 30 June 1987 (age 39)
- Place of birth: Liptovský Mikuláš, Czechoslovakia
- Height: 1.77 m (5 ft 9 1/2 in)
- Position: Left midfielder

Team information
- Current team: Dynamo Malženice
- Number: 13

Youth career
- 1997–?: Tatran Liptovský Mikuláš
- ?–2006: Ružomberok

Senior career*
Years	Team	Apps	(Gls)
- Ružomberok B
- TJ Máj Černová
????–2009	Turany		
2009–2011	Sokol Dolná Ždaňa		
2012–2013	Bohemians 1905	10	(0)
2013	→ SFM Senec (loan)	30	(12)
2014–2015	Pohronie	38	(5)
2015	Sereď	18	(4)
2016	Syrianska Kerburan	?	(?)
2016–2017	Liptovský Hrádok	33	(21)
2018–2022	Dynamo Malženice	112	(57)
2023–	Bučany	13	(10)
- * Club domestic league appearances and goals as of 19:41, 6 February 2024 (UTC)

Pavol Orolín (born 30 June 1987 in Liptovský Mikuláš) is a Slovak football midfielder who currently plays for an amateur side of OFK Bučany.
