= Lukáš Džogan =

Slovak footballer

Personal information
- Full name: Lukáš Džogan
- Date of birth: 1 January 1987 (age 39)
- Place of birth: Košice, Czechoslovakia
- Height: 1.91 m (6 ft 3 in)
- Position: Centre back

Team information
- Current team: FK TATRA Sokoľany

Youth career
- 1. FC Košice

Senior career*
Years	Team	Apps	(Gls)
- Ličartovce
2005–2007	MFK Košice B		
2007–2014	MFK Košice	39	(1)
2012	→ Lokomotíva Košice (loan)		
2012–2014	→ Barca (loan)		
2014–	FK TATRA Sokoľany	0	(0)

International career
2006	Slovakia U-19	6	(0)
2007–2008	Slovakia U-21	7	(0)
- * Club domestic league appearances and goals as of 29 January 2016

Lukáš Džogan (pronounced Djogan) (born 1 January 1987) is a professional Slovak football defender who currently plays for FK TATRA Sokoľany.

== Career statistics ==
Club	Season	League		Domestic Cup		Europe		Total	
Club	Season	Pld	GF	Pld	GF	Pld	GF	Pld	GF
MFK Košice	2007–08	15	0	2	0	0	0	17	0
MFK Košice	2008–09	20	1	4	0	0	0	24	1
MFK Košice	2009–10	2	0	1	0	0	0	3	0
Total		37	1	7	0	0	0	44	1

Last updated: 21 May 2010
