= Vladimír Kražel =

Slovak footballer

Personal information
- Full name: Vladimír Kražel
- Date of birth: 28 September 1991 (age 35)
- Place of birth: Czechoslovakia
- Height: 1.75 m (5 ft 9 in)
- Position: Right back

Team information
- Current team: Slavoj Trebišov
- Number: 3

Youth career
- Košice

Senior career*
Years	Team	Apps	(Gls)
2010–2012	Košice	3	(0)
2012	→ Bodva Moldava nad Bodvou (loan)	13	(0)
2012	→ Košice-Barca (loan)		
2013–2014	Bodva Moldava nad Bodvou		
2015	Seekirchen	3	(0)
2015–2016	Košice - Krásna		
2016–	Slavoj Trebišov	70	(1)
- * Club domestic league appearances and goals as of 9 January 2020

Vladimír Kražel (born 28 September 1991) is a Slovak football defender who at the moment plays for Slavoj Trebišov.

== Career ==
He made his debut for Košice against Senica on 14 August 2010.
