= Dobrivoj Rusov =

Slovak footballer

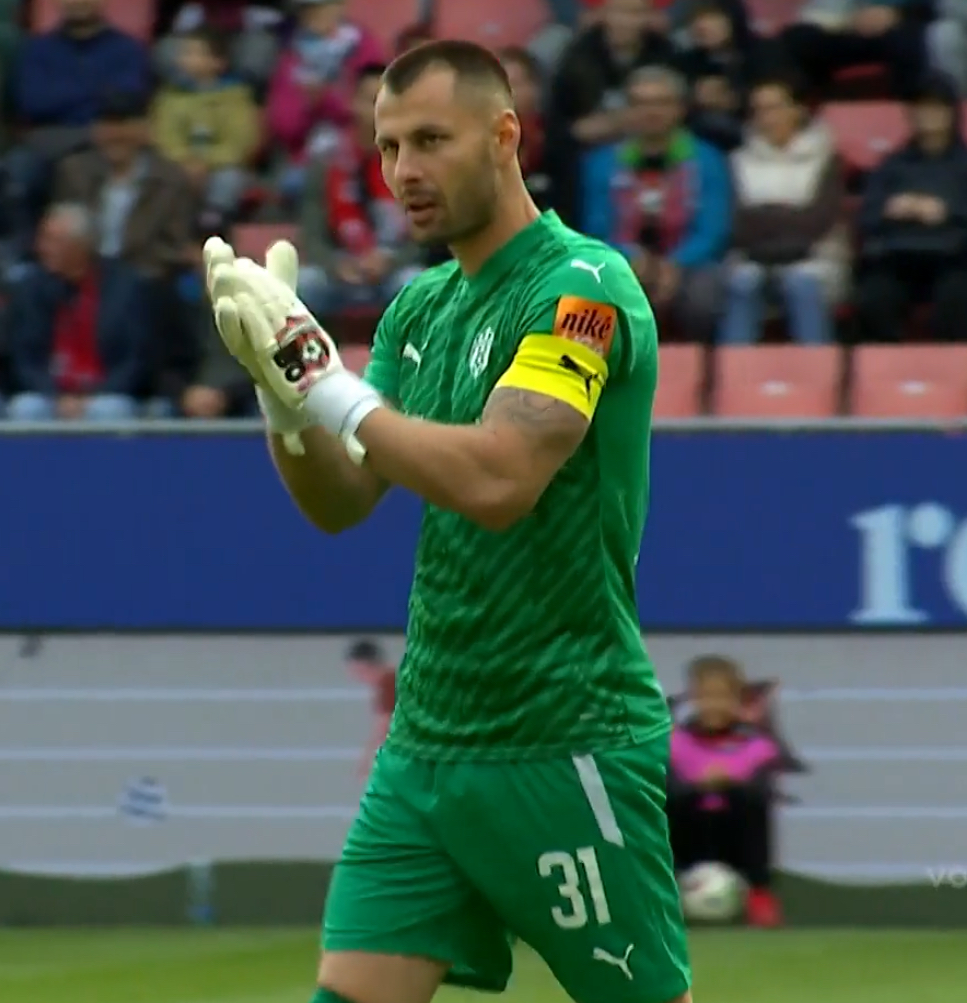
- Rusov in his retirement match

Personal information
- Date of birth: 13 January 1993 (age 33)
- Place of birth: Trnava, Slovakia
- Height: 1.89 m (6 ft 2 in)
- Position: Goalkeeper

Youth career
- 2000–2006: Lokomotíva Trnava
- 2006–2011: Spartak Trnava

Senior career*
Years	Team	Apps	(Gls)
2011–2014	Spartak Trnava	50	(0)
2015–2017	Piast Gliwice	19	(0)
2018–2025	Spartak Trnava	64	(0)

International career
2012–2014	Slovakia U21	12	(0)
- * Club domestic league appearances and goals as of 17 May 2025

Dobrivoj Rusov (born 13 January 1993) is a Slovak former professional footballer who played as a goalkeeper. He is a former Slovakia U21 youth representative.

Rusov began his career at Spartak Trnava, where he gradually established himself as the first choice goalkeeper. In 2015, he moved to the Polish club Piast Gliwice, where he played until 2018. After returning to Trnava, he became the team captain and significantly contributed to winning the Slovak Cup in the 2018/2019 season, saving two penalties in the shoot-out.

== Club career ==
=== Spartak Trnava ===
Rusov was born on January 13, 1993 in Trnava. He began his football career at FK Lokomotíva Trnava, from where he moved to FC Spartak Trnava in 2006. He was promoted to Spartak Trnava first team in July 2011 from youth teams.

In the 2012/13 season, Rusov fought with Spartak for survival in the top flight, which was successful. He made his league debut against Žilina on 20 October 2012. In early September 2013, he broke a bone in his hand, which required a break of about a month. He appeared with Trnava in the 2014–15 UEFA Europa League. In the first match of the second qualifying round against the Georgian club FC Zestafoni, he kept a clean sheet in a 0–0 draw. He also kept a clean sheet in the second match, and a 3–0 home win ensured Trnava's progression to the 3rd qualifying round against the Scottish club St. Johnstone FC. On 8 July 2014, he signed a new contract with the team until the summer of 2017. He played a total of 50 league matches for the team.

=== Piast Gliwice ===
In January 2015, he joined Piast Gliwice. He stayed in Gliwice for three years, but did not establish himself as the first choice goalkeeper and mostly served as second choice behind Jakub Szmatuła.

=== Return to Spartak Trnava ===
In the summer of 2018, Rusov returned to Trnava. He played in the 2019 Slovak Cup final against MŠK Žilina. After the match finished 3–3, Rusov would be substituted on in the 119th minute ahead of the penalty shoot out. He saved 3 penalties, including the winning one, to help his team win the cup.

Rusov's time at Spartak concluded with his retirement announcement on 14 May 2025, at the age of 32, ahead of his final professional match against FK Železiarne Podbrezová on 17 May 2025. The decision was influenced by recurring knee injuries, including a severe cruciate ligament tear in March 2021 against MŠK Žilina that sidelined him for over a year, compounded by multiple surgeries, a further knee injury in 2024, and rehabilitation efforts. As the goalkeeping leader and later the captain, he significantly contributed to domestic successes, helping Spartak win the Slovak Cup in the 2018/19, 2021/22, 2022/23 and 2024/25 seasons.

== Style of play ==
During his professional career, Rusov was most known for his reflexes. He was also considered a penalty specialist.

== International career ==
=== Youth ===
Rusov made his international debut in a 2012 friendly against Russia U21, which Slovakia lost 2–1. He captained the U21 team in a 1–0 loss against Czech Republic U21 in 2013.

== Honours ==
Spartak Trnava

- Slovak Cup: 2018–19, 2021–22, 2022–23, 2024–25

Individual

- Andel roka (Player of the Year of Spartak Trnava): 2019, 2020
