= Zoltán Bognár =

Slovak footballer (born 1988)

Personal information
- Full name: Zoltán Bognár
- Date of birth: 9 February 1988 (age 38)
- Place of birth: Czechoslovakia
- Height: 1.91 m (6 ft 3 in)
- Position: Striker

Team information
- Current team: TJ OFC Gabčíkovo

Youth career
- DAC Dunajská Streda

Senior career*
Years	Team	Apps	(Gls)
?–2009	DAC Dunajská Streda	16	(3)
2010–2011	1. FC Tatran Prešov	6	(0)
2011	SFM Senec (loan)	19	(3)
2012	FK Moldava (loan)	6	(1)
2012–2014	TJ OFC Gabčíkovo	58	(31)
2014–2017	Velky Meder		
2017–	SK Vydrany		
- * Club domestic league appearances and goals as of 1 January 2026

Zoltán Bognár (born 9 February 1988) is a professional Slovak footballer of Hungarian ethnicity who currently plays for Slovak club SK Vydrany.

== Personal life ==
Bognár was born with a Hungarian name but has Eastern Slovak roots, as his mother came from Svidník. Before joining Tatran, he studied at the University of Economics in Bratislava.

== Club career ==
=== Dunajska Streda ===
In September 2008, Bognár signed a contract with Dunajská Streda, but the club allegedly had the player's contract registered with the Slovak Football Association in violation of applicable standards. However, the latter legalized it nevertheless, and did not recognize the first Prešov contract. Following the decision, he would have to remain with the club for more than half a year. Bognár scored a hat-trick for DAC in a 3–2 league win against FC Petržalka. It was the first time that a player for DAC scored a hat-trick since 1999.

=== Tatran Prešov ===
Before the spring part of the 2009/2010 season, Bogár joined 1. FC Tatran Prešov, signing a 3 year contract. He joined Tatran for a fee of around 33,193 euros. Bogár scored his first goal for the green and whites in a friendly match against MFK Ružomberok B, scoring a header after a cross from Ľuboš Belejík. In the winter of 2011, he joined SFM Senec on a half year loan.

== International career ==
In 2010, Bogár was part of the wider nomination for the Slovakia national under-21 football team.
