= FK Lokomotíva Trnava =

Slovak football club

Lokomotíva Trnava
- Full name: FK Lokomotíva Trnava
- Nickname: Lokotka
- Founded: 1935; 91 years ago
- Ground: Stadium FK Lokomotíva Trnava, Trnava
- Capacity: 500
- Chairman: Peter Moravčík
- Manager: Dušan Demovič
- League: III. trieda A
- Website: http://www.fklokomotivatrnava.sk

FK Lokomotíva Trnava is a Slovak football club, based in the town of Trnava.

== History ==
Founded as AC Vozovka in 1935, the club played its matches next to the railway line from Trnava to Leopoldov. In 1950 the club would be renamed to Lokomotíva Trnava. In 1999, long-time player Peter Moravčík took over the club.

== Youth ==
Lokomotiva Trnava is known for its education of young footballers. In 2024, the under-13 team won the championship title in the second league west, while the under-15 category finished second in its league competition. The majority of youth players that show promise in the Lokomotiva academy are transferred to Spartak Trnava.

== Stadium ==
In addition to a football field with an artificial surface, two grass football fields and asphalt fields, the sports complex also includes tennis courts and mini golf courses. The football fields are used for the activities of FK Lokomotíva Trnava. The first football field with artificial turf in Trnava was ceremonially opened at Lokomotiv Trnava. In 2025, the complex saw major re-construction funded by the Trnava city.

== Affiliated clubs ==
The following clubs are currently affiliated with Lokomotíva Trnava:

- FC Spartak Trnava (2016-present)

== Notable players ==
Players of past and present that made an appearance in a fully professional league.

- (Slovakia) Ľubomír Gogolák (youth player)
- (Slovakia) Miloš Juhász (youth player)
- (Slovakia) Dobrivoj Rusov (youth player)
- (Slovakia) Sebastian Nebyla (youth player)
