= Ali Ceesay =

Gambian football defender

Personal information
- Full name: Ali Ceesay
- Date of birth: 10 October 1992 (age 34)
- Place of birth: Banjul, Gambia
- Height: 1.87 m (6 ft 1 1/2 in)
- Position: Left back

Youth career
- Samger

Senior career*
Years	Team	Apps	(Gls)
2011	Žilina B	11	(0)
2011–2013	Žilina	4	(0)
2011–2012	→ Zemplín Michalovce (loan)	20	(1)
2012	→ Šamorín (loan)	9	(0)
2014	Skonto Rīga	2	(0)
Total		46	(1)
- * Club domestic league appearances and goals as of 12 October 2014

Ali Ceesay (born 10 October 1992) is a Gambian football defender, who last played for Skonto Rīga in the Latvian Higher League.

== Club career ==
=== MŠK Žilina ===
Ali Ceesay started his football career playing for Samger. Ceesay transferred to Žilina in spring 2011. His older brother Momodou is also a footballer. Ali made his debut for Žilina against Košice on 25 May 2011.

=== MFK Zemplín Michalovce ===
Ceesay joined Zemplín Michalovce in July 2011 on a one-year loan from Žilina. He made his debut for the club against Tatran Liptovský Mikuláš on 23 August 2011 in the 2011–12 Slovak Cup.

=== FC ŠTK 1914 Šamorín ===
In Summer 2012 Ceesay left Žilina yet again to play for ŠTK 1914 Šamorín on a one-year loan.

=== Skonto Rīga ===
In March 2014 the Latvian Higher League club Skonto Rīga announced the signing of Ali Ceesay for the upcoming season. He became the first ever Gambian player to play in the Latvian championship. He left the club in mid-season, being unable to settle in the first eleven.
