= Igor Držík =

Slovak footballer

Personal information
- Full name: Igor Držík
- Date of birth: 10 April 1982 (age 44)
- Place of birth: Ilava, Czechoslovakia
- Height: 1.74 m (5 ft 8 1/2 in)
- Position: Midfielder

Team information
- Current team: ŠK SFM Senec (on loan from Bohemians 1905)
- Number: 4

Youth career
- MFK Dubnica

Senior career*
Years	Team	Apps	(Gls)
2001–2009	MFK Dubnica	255	(6)
2010	SFM Senec	14	(0)
2010–2011	Bohemians 1905	25	(1)
2011–2012	→FC Nitra loan	20	(0)
2012–	→SFM Senec loan	0	(0)
- * Club domestic league appearances and goals as of 1 June 2012

Igor Držík (born 10 April 1982 in Ilava) is a Slovak football player who currently plays for ŠK SFM Senec.
