= Peter Hoferica =

Slovak footballer

Personal information
- Full name: Peter Hoferica
- Date of birth: 28 June 1983 (age 43)
- Place of birth: Žilina, Czechoslovakia
- Height: 1.79 m (5 ft 10 1/2 in)
- Position: Midfielder

Team information
- Current team: Družstevník Liptovská Štiavnica

Youth career
- TJ Družstevník Hlboké
- Považská Bystrica

Senior career*
| Years | Team | Apps | (Gls) |
| 2002–2004 | Pezinok | | |
| 2004–2006 | SV Scheibbs | | |
| 2006–2007 | Aqua Turčianske Teplice | | |
| 2007 | Banská Bystrica | | |
| 2007–2008 | Senec | 14 | (1) |
| 2008 | Dunajská Streda | 0 | (0) |
| 2008–2009 | Lučenec | | |
| 2010–2012 | Ružomberok | 63 | (5) |
| 2012 | → Rimavská Sobota (loan) | 1 | (0) |
| 2013 | Karviná | 8 | (0) |
| 2013–2015 | Tatran Liptovský Mikuláš | 39 | (4) |
| 2015–2016 | Raków Częstochowa | 40 | (3) |
| 2016– | Družstevník Liptovská Štiavnica | | |
- * Club domestic league appearances and goals as of 28 June 2024

Peter Hoferica (born 28 June 1983) is a Slovak professional footballer who plays as a midfielder for Družstevník Liptovská Štiavnica.
