= Martin Zlatohlavý =

Slovak footballer

Personal information
- Full name: Martin Zlatohlavý
- Date of birth: 2 November 1985 (age 40)
- Place of birth: Prešov, Czechoslovakia
- Height: 1.83 m (6 ft 0 in)
- Position: Centre-back

Team information
- Current team: SC Sommerein
- Number: 2

Youth career
- –2003: Tatran Prešov

Senior career*
Years	Team	Apps	(Gls)
2003–2007	Tatran Prešov		
2007–2011	HFK Olomouc	39	(2)
2009–2011	→ Dolný Kubín (loan)		
2011	Spišská Nová Ves	16	(3)
2012	Sandecja Nowy Sącz	9	(0)
2013–	SC Sommerein		

International career
2003–2004	Slovakia U19		
2004	Slovakia U21		
- * Club domestic league appearances and goals as of 2 November 2024

Martin Zlatohlavý (born 2 November 1985) is a Slovak footballer who plays as a defender for Austrian club SC Sommerein. He has played for various clubs throughout his career, including MFK Dolný Kubín, FK Spišská Nová Ves and Polish I liga club Sandecja Nowy Sącz. He made his senior debut for Tatran Prešov against ŠKP Devín on 17 June 2003.
