= Vladimír Perexta =

Slovak footballer

Personal information
- Full name: Vladimír Perexta
- Date of birth: 13 January 1990 (age 36)
- Place of birth: Michalovce, Czechoslovakia
- Height: 1.78 m (5 ft 10 in)
- Position: Centre back

Youth career
- Michalovce
- 2005–2009: Žilina

Senior career*
Years	Team	Apps	(Gls)
2010	→ Rimavská Sobota (loan)		
2011–2012	→ Považská Bystrica (loan)		
2013–	Žilina B		
2013–2014	Žilina	2	(0)
2014–2017	TJ Straza		
2017–2018	FK Terchova		

International career
	Slovakia U-18	2	(0)
- * Club domestic league appearances and goals

Vladimír Perexta (born 13 January 1990) was a professional Slovak football player. He is currently the fitness coach of MŠK Žilina.

== Club career ==
=== Early career ===
Born in Michalovce, he started his career by playing in the youth teams of MFK Zemplín Michalovce. He would later leave for MŠK Žilina in his youth. In August 2010, he went on loan from Žilina's reserve team to MŠK Rimavská Sobota, along with Oliver Práznovský. He then also played on loan for FK Raven Považská Bystrica.

=== MŠK Žilina ===
He made his debut in the Slovak top league for Žilina at the age of 23 on 24 November 2013 in the 18th round of the league against the champion Slovan Bratislava. Žilina coach Adrián Guľa was missing the experienced defender duo Serge Akakpo and Jozef Piaček, who were replaced by Perexta and the only seventeen-year-old Denis Vavro. Žilina lost the game 2–1.

== International career ==
Perexta played two matches for the Slovak national under-18 team, both against Slovenia, where he played as a left back.
