= Roman Smieška =

Slovak footballer

Personal information
- Full name: Roman Smieška
- Date of birth: 18 December 1986 (age 39)
- Place of birth: Ružomberok, Czechoslovakia
- Height: 1.87 m (6 ft 1 1/2 in)
- Position: Goalkeeper

Team information
- Current team: ŠKM Liptovský Hrádok
- Number: 30

Youth career
- 1997–2005: MFK Ružomberok

Senior career*
Years	Team	Apps	(Gls)
2005–2012	MFK Ružomberok	16	(0)
2012–	→ ŠKM Liptovský Hrádok (loan)		
- * Club domestic league appearances and goals as of 24 January 2011

Roman Smieška (born 18 December 1986) is a former Slovak footballer who currently plays for ŠKM Liptovský Hrádok. His former club was a club MFK Ružomberok. He is also current fashion model.

Smieska was born in Ružomberok, Czechoslovakia, and started his career 1997 with MFK Ružomberok and played until summer 2012 for the club.

== Personal life ==
He works besides his football career as Fashion model in Slovakia.
