= Miroslav Hozda =

Czech footballer (born 1986)

Personal information
- Full name: Miroslav Hozda
- Date of birth: 6 May 1986 (age 40)
- Place of birth: Jilemnice, Czechoslovakia
- Height: 1.83 m (6 ft 0 in)
- Position: Defender

Senior career*
| Years | Team | Apps | (Gls) |
| 2007–2009 | Baumit Jablonec | 1 | (0) |
| 2007–2008 | → Zenit Čáslav (loan) | | |
| 2008 | → Dukla Prague (loan) | | |
| 2009–2012 | Varnsdorf | 52 | (3) |
| 2012 | DAC Dunajská Streda | 13 | (0) |
| 2013 | Arsenal Česká Lípa | | |
| 2013–2014 | FK Železný Brod | | |
| 2014–2021 | SC Amaliendorf-Aafland | | |
| 2022–2023 | SC Pfaffenschlag | | |
| 2023 | Drzkov | | |
- * Club domestic league appearances and goals as of 10 March 2020

Miroslav Hozda (born 6 May 1986 in Jilemnice) is a Czech former football defender who currently coaches youth players for FK Jablonec.

== Club career ==
=== Early career ===
Hozda is a product of the Jablonec academy. He made his first and only appearance for the club in a 3–1 win over 1. FC Slovácko, staring the match.

In 2008, Hozda joined Dukla Prague on a one-year loan. However, he only stayed at the club for a few months.

=== Varnsdorf ===
In 2009, Hozda played for second division club FK Varnsdorf, captaining the side. On 8 June 2011, in a 1–1 draw against FC Slovan Liberec, he made an important last minute tackle which secured a draw to Varnsdorf. Hozda scored the winning goal in a 1–0 win against FK Třinec on 21 November 2011, scoring in the 22nd minute to seal the second win for Varnsdorf on home soil.

=== After football ===
In 2020, Hozda became a youth coach for FK Jablonec.
