= Juraj Chupač =

Slovak footballer

Personal information
- Date of birth: 17 March 1988 (age 38)
- Place of birth: Kysucký Lieskovec, Czechoslovakia
- Height: 1.95 m (6 ft 5 in)
- Position: Centre back

Youth career
- Žilina

Senior career*
Years	Team	Apps	(Gls)
2009–2015	Žilina	8	(0)
2010	→ Dubnica (loan)	14	(0)
2011	→ Sokolov (loan)	11	(0)
2011–2012	→ Dukla Banská Bystrica (loan)	7	(0)
2012	→ MFK Košice (loan)	7	(0)
2013	→ Púchov (loan)		
2015–2020	Krásno nad Kysucou		
2016–2017	→ Banská Bystrica (loan)	18	(0)
2020–2024	TSU Hafnerbach		

International career
2010	Slovakia U-21	1	(0)
- * Club domestic league appearances and goals as of 19 November 2016

Juraj Chupač (born 17 March 1988) is a Slovak football central defender.
