= Guillaume N'Kendo =

Cameroonian footballer

Personal information
- Full name: Guillaume N'Kendo Tchougang
- Date of birth: 6 June 1986 (age 40)
- Place of birth: Douala, Cameroon
- Height: 1.83 m (6 ft 0 in)
- Position: Striker

Senior career*
Years	Team	Apps	(Gls)
2001–2003	Sahel		
2003–2004	Cintra Yaoundé		
2004–2005	Union Douala		
2006–2007	Hammam-Lif		
2007–2008	Paykan	20	(4)
2008–2009	Albacete Balompié	1	(0)
2009	Alzira (loan)	9	(3)
2009–2012	DAC Dunajská Streda	38	(4)
2013	Interclube	26	(13)
2014	Benfica Lubango	23	(15)
2014	1º de Maio Benguela	28	(13)
2014–2016	Hacettepe	58	(33)
2016–2017	1º de Maio Benguela	26	(11)
- * Club domestic league appearances and goals as of 10 August 2017 (UTC)

Guillaume N'Kendo Tchougang (born 6 January 1986) is a former Cameroonian football striker. He had notably played in Turkey and Slovakia.
