= Miloš Juhász =

Slovak footballer

Personal information
- Full name: Miloš Juhász
- Date of birth: 3 January 1984 (age 42)
- Place of birth: Czechoslovakia
- Height: 1.78 m (5 ft 10 in)
- Position: Midfielder

Team information
- Current team: Šúrovce
- Number: 16

Youth career
- Lokomotíva Trnava
- Spartak Trnava

Senior career*
Years	Team	Apps	(Gls)
	Spartak Trnava	53	(3)
2008	Vlašim		
2009–2011	Senica	37	(2)
2010	→ Spartak Trnava (loan)	11	(2)
2011	→ Myjava (loan)	12	(1)
2011–	Šúrovce		

International career
- Slovakia U-15
- Slovakia U-19
- * Club domestic league appearances and goals as of 24 March 2012

Miloš Juhász (born 3 January 1984) is a Slovak football midfielder.

On 8 January 2025, he signed a 1 year contract with ŠK Cífer.
