= Martin Labaška =

Slovak footballer

Personal information
- Date of birth: 28 August 1982 (age 44)
- Place of birth: Slovakia
- Height: 1.75 m (5 ft 9 in)
- Position: Striker

Youth career
- Liptovský Mikuláš
- Ružomberok

Senior career*
Years	Team	Apps	(Gls)
?–2004	Ružomberok	27	
2004–2005	Horn		
2006–2007	Schwadorf		
2008	Trenkwalder Admira		
2009	DAC Dunajská Streda	4	(0)
2009–2011	Schwadorf 1936		
2011–?	Tatran Liptovský Mikuláš		
- * Club domestic league appearances and goals

Martin Labaška (born 28 August 1982) is a Slovak former professional footballer who played as a striker.
