= Ján Čarnota =

Slovak footballer

Personal information
- Full name: Ján Čarnota
- Date of birth: 8 June 1985 (age 41)
- Place of birth: Stará Ľubovňa, Czechoslovakia
- Height: 1.82 m (6 ft 0 in)
- Position: Right back

Youth career
- Stará Ľubovňa
- Prešov

Senior career*
Years	Team	Apps	(Gls)
- Stará Ľubovňa
2006–2010	Dolný Kubín		
2009	→ Ružomberok (loan)		
2010–2011	Spartak Trnava	19	(0)
2011–2012	Dolný Kubín	24	(0)
2012	Michalovce	12	(0)
2013	Opava	5	(0)
- * Club domestic league appearances and goals as of 15 July 2012

Ján Čarnota (born 8 June 1985) is a Slovak football defender.

His brother Patrik Čarnota is also footballer.
