= David Šmahaj =

Czech footballer

Personal information
- Full name: David Šmahaj
- Date of birth: 4 November 1981 (age 45)
- Place of birth: Czechoslovakia
- Height: 1.83 m (6 ft 0 in)
- Position: Right midfielder

Youth career
- ?–1998: Slavia Uherské Hradiště

Senior career*
Years	Team	Apps	(Gls)
2001–2003	Tescoma Zlín		
2002	→Vítkovice (loan)		
2003–2005	Slovácko	2	(0)
2005–2006	Hanácká Slavia Kroměříž		
2006–2011	Tescoma Zlín	84	(6)
2011	Ružomberok	6	(0)
2012	Znojmo		
- SC Columbia Floridsdorf
- * Club domestic league appearances and goals as of 29 February 2012

David Šmahaj (born 4 November 1981) is a Czech football midfielder. He previously played for Ružomberok.
