= Martin Železník =

Slovak footballer

Personal information
- Full name: Martin Železník
- Date of birth: 9 November 1989 (age 36)
- Place of birth: Czechoslovakia
- Height: 1.82 m (5 ft 11 1/2 in)
- Position: Midfielder

Youth career
- FC Spartak Trnava

Senior career*
| Years | Team | Apps | (Gls) |
| 2009–2012 | FC Spartak Trnava | 17 | (1) |
| 2010 | → SFM Senec (loan) | 17 | (0) |
| 2011–2012 | → SFM Senec (loan) | 23 | (1) |
- * Club domestic league appearances and goals as of 30 May 2012

Martin Železník (born 9 November 1989) is a Slovak football midfielder who is free agent.
