= Markus Seelaus =

Austrian footballer

Personal information
- Full name: Markus Rudolf Seelaus
- Date of birth: 16 February 1987 (age 39)
- Place of birth: Austria
- Height: 1.79 m (5 ft 10 in)
- Position: Midfielder

Team information
- Current team: SV Innsbruck

Youth career
- Innsbrucker AC
- Austria Wien
- –2004: BNZ Tirol

Senior career*
| Years | Team | Apps | (Gls) |
| 2004–2005 | Wacker Tirol | 26 | (1) |
| 2005–2006 | → SV Wörgl | 2 | (0) |
| 2006–2007 | → WSG Swarovski Wattens | 9 | (1) |
| 2007–2009 | Wacker Innsbruck | 26 | (1) |
| 2009–2010 | Dunajská Streda | 25 | (1) |
| 2011 | SVG Reichenau | 12 | (0) |
| 2011–2013 | SV Innsbruck | | |

International career
| 2006–2007 | Austria U-20 | 4 | (0) |
- * Club domestic league appearances and goals as of 3 August 2009

Markus Seelaus (born 16 February 1987) is an Austrian footballer who currently plays for Austrian side SV Innsbruck.
