= Radoslav Augustín =

Slovak footballer

Personal information
- Full name: Radoslav Augustín
- Date of birth: 5 January 1987 (age 39)
- Place of birth: Bratislava, Czechoslovakia
- Height: 1.82 m (6 ft 0 in)
- Position: Midfielder

Team information
- Current team: SV Gols

Youth career
- Slovan Bratislava

Senior career*
Years	Team	Apps	(Gls)
2005	Union Royale Namur		
2005–2007	Inter Bratislava	2	(0)
2006–2007	→ Senec (loan)	14	(2)
2007–2008	Inter Bratislava	0	(0)
2009	Bohemians 1905	1	(0)
2010–2011	Petržalka	37	(14)
2011–2015	Slovan Bratislava	1	(0)
2012	→ Banská Bystrica (loan)	19	(1)
2013	→ Prešov (loan)	5	(0)
2013	→ SFM Senec (loan)	20	(5)
2014	→ Nitra (loan)	14	(0)
2015–	SV Gols		
- * Club domestic league appearances and goals as of 16 March 2014

Radoslav Augustín (born 5 January 1987) is a Slovak football midfielder who currently plays for SV Gols.

== Career ==
Augustín was born in Bratislava. He won three youth titles with Slovan Bratislava. His clubs included Inter Bratislava, Senec, the Czech side Bohemians 1905, Petržalka and Slovan, and in 2012 he was on loan at Dukla Banská Bystrica.

In winter 2013, Augustín joined Slovak side Tatran Prešov on a one-year loan from Slovan Bratislava. He later played on loan for the second-division club ŠK SFM Senec, and in January 2014 he rejoined Slovan for its winter preparation.
