= ŠK Kremnička =

Slovak football team

- Full name: ŠK Kremnička
- Founded: 1952
- Dissolved: 26 June 2017; 7 years ago
- Ground: Štadión ŠK Kremnička, Banská Bystrica
- Capacity: 1,500
- Chairman: Jozef Ganz
- President: Milan Smädo
- Coach: Norbert Juračka
- 2016-17: 3. liga, 3rd
- Website: http://skkremnicka.sk/klub
Home colours

ŠK Kremnička was a Slovak football team, based in the town of Banská Bystrica. The club was founded in 1952 and dissolved in Summer 2017, after decision of club's owner Milan Smädo to save youth teams of collapsed club MFK Dukla Banská Bystrica and continuous with a long tradition of the name Dukla.
