= Dušan Kolmokov =

Slovak footballer

Personal information
- Full name: Dušan Kolmokov
- Date of birth: 17 May 1985 (age 41)
- Place of birth: Topoľčany, Czechoslovakia
- Height: 1.88 m (6 ft 2 in)
- Position: Goalkeeper

Team information
- Current team: FC Nitra
- Number: 32

Senior career*
| Years | Team | Apps | (Gls) |
| ?–2010 | Dubnica | 4 | (0) |
| 2011 | → Šaľa (loan) | 12 | (0) |
| 2011 | Dubnica | 1 | (0) |
| 2012 | → Šaľa (loan) | | |
| 2012–2016 | → Šaľa (loan) | 82 | (0) |
| 2016– | FC Nitra | 10 | (0) |
- * Club domestic league appearances and goals as of 28 August 2016

Dušan Kolmokov (born 17 May 1985) is a Slovak footballer who plays as a goalkeeper for the Slovak 2. liga club FC Nitra.
