= Tomáš Mrva =

Slovak footballer

Personal information
- Full name: Tomáš Mrva
- Date of birth: 20 July 1987 (age 39)
- Place of birth: Trnava, Czechoslovakia
- Height: 1.77 m (5 ft 10 in)
- Position: Left back

Youth career
- Brezová pod Bradlom
- Myjava
- Dubnica
- 2006–2008: Brøndby IF

Senior career*
| Years | Team | Apps | (Gls) |
| 2009–2010 | České Budějovice | 0 | (0) |
| 2009–2010 | → Senica (loan) | 2 | (0) |
| 2010–2012 | Dubnica | 15 | (0) |
| 2011 | → Ružiná (loan) | | |
| 2011 | → Dolný Kubín (loan) | 15 | (0) |
| 2012–2013 | Myjava | 18 | (0) |
| 2013– | Ružiná | | |

International career
| 2009 | Slovakia U-21 | 1 | (0) |
- * Club domestic league appearances and goals as of 11 October 2013

Tomáš Mrva (born 20 July 1987) is a Slovak former footballer who played as a forward. He also appeared on two seasons of Slovak reality television show Farma, winning the sixth season in 2016.

== Football career ==
In 2006, Mrva joined Danish Brøndby IF's promising youth academy, but did not get his first team debut before returning to Slovakia – when he was signed Brøndby talent boss Kim Vilfort, who said "Tomas is a really good ball player, and we don't have a natural left footed back in our system ... he's got a great potential and we can see him having the abilities af going all the way to the A-team in the long run...". Mrva joined Czech side České Budějovice in January 2009, and was assigned the number 23 shirt. Although he played in the Bohemian Football League for the club's B-team, he failed to make a first-team appearance in his time with the club. While with České Budějovice, Mrva was called up to the Slovakia U-21 side in March 2009.

=== Return to Slovakia ===
Mrva then went to Slovakia, becoming one of sixteen new players in the 21-man squad of Senica ahead of the 2009–10 Slovak Superliga. Having been on loan at the club from České Budějovice, he left Senica in the mid-season break of that season. Mrva played for Myjava in the 2012–13 Slovak First Football League, but left the club at the end of the season.

== Television career ==
In 2012, Mrva participated in season 2 of Slovak reality series Farma, from which he was expelled in May 2012. He was reinstated later the same month. Mrva went on to reach the final, where he faced Rado Spireng. Spireng won the final, leaving Mrva as runner-up. Mrva returned for the seventh season of Farma in 2016, where he reached the final and defeated Lucia Mokráňová, winning the show and its €50,000 prize.
