= Ján Dzúrik =

Slovak footballer

Ján Dzurík
Personal information
- Full name: Ján Dzurík
- Date of birth: 18 July 1993 (age 33)
- Place of birth: Prešov, Slovakia
- Height: 1.80 m (5 ft 11 in)
- Position: Midfielder

Team information
- Current team: Humenné
- Number: 18

Youth career
- Tatran Prešov

Senior career*
Years	Team	Apps	(Gls)
2012–2018	Tatran Prešov	148	(5)
2012–2013	→ Partizán Bardejov (loan)	42	(5)
2019–2020	Pohronie	27	(1)
2020–2021	Partizán Bardejov	27	(1)
2021–	Humenné	102	(9)

International career^{‡}
2013–2014	Slovakia U19	2	(0)
- * Club domestic league appearances and goals as of 2 January 2025 ‡ National team caps and goals as of 19 July 2020

Ján Dzurík (born 18 July 1993) is a Slovak professional footballer who plays as a midfielder for Humenné in 2. Liga.

== Club career ==
=== 1. FC Tatran Prešov ===
Dzúrik made his Fortuna Liga debut for Tatran Prešov in an away against Ružomberok on 16 July 2016. The match concluded in a 1:0 defeat for Tatran, following a goal by Martin Chrien. Dzurík had completed the entire game.
