= TJ Sokol Dolná Ždaňa =

Former Slovak football club

Sokol Dolná Ždaňa
- Full name: TJ Sokol Dolná Ždaňa
- Founded: 1966
- Dissolved: 2012 (became FK Pohronie)
- Ground: Štadión Dolná Ždaňa, Dolná Ždaňa
- Capacity: 1,000
Home colours	Away colours

TJ Sokol Dolná Ždaňa was a Slovak football club based in the town of Dolná Ždaňa, founded in 1966. In 2012, the club merged with FK Žiar nad Hronom to form FK Pohronie.
