= Ľuboš Kupčík =

Slovak footballer

Personal information
- Full name: Ľuboš Kupčík
- Date of birth: 3 March 1989 (age 37)
- Place of birth: Trstená, Czechoslovakia
- Height: 1.87 m (6 ft 2 in)
- Position: Centre back

Team information
- Current team: Pohronie
- Number: 12

Youth career
- Rakytovce

Senior career*
Years	Team	Apps	(Gls)
–2010	Rakytovce		
2011–2012	Dukla Banská Bystrica	34	(0)
2013–2017	Podbrezová	108	(8)
2017–2018	Podbrezová B	19	(0)
2018–2023	Dukla Banská Bystrica	94	(2)
2023–	Pohronie	17	(0)
- * Club domestic league appearances and goals as of 22 June 2024

Ľuboš Kupčík (born 3 March 1989) is a Slovak professional footballer who plays for Pohronie.

In 2018, he returned to Dukla Banská Bystrica after spending five years playing for ŽP Šport Podbrezová.
