= Andrej Brčák =

Slovak football player

Personal information
- Date of birth: 17 August 1984 (age 42)
- Place of birth: Trstená, Czechoslovakia
- Height: 1.85 m (6 ft 1 in)
- Positions: Striker; attacking midfielder

Team information
- Current team: FK Nižná nad Oravou

Youth career
- Ostražica
- FK Nižná nad Oravou
- 2000: → TJ OFZ Istebné (loan)

Senior career*
Years	Team	Apps	(Gls)
2001–2003	TJ OFZ Istebné		
2003–2014	FK Nižná nad Oravou		
2006–2007	→ Dolný Kubín (loan)		
2008–2010	→ Námestovo (loan)		
2011	→ ViOn Zlaté Moravce (loan)	15	(2)
2011–2012	→ ViOn Zlaté Moravce (loan)	29	(3)
2012–2013	→ Dolný Kubín (loan)	18	(5)
2013	→ TatranLiptovský Mikuláš (loan)	18	(3)
2014	→ SFM Senec (loan)	13	(3)
2014–2015	SC Herzogenburg		
2015	ASK Kottingbrunn		
2016-2019	SC Herzogenburg		
2020-	FK Nižná nad Oravou		
- * Club domestic league appearances and goals as of 15 March 2013

Andrej Brčák (born 17 August 1984) is a Slovak football striker who currently plays for FK Nižná nad Oravou.
