= FK Košice-Barca =

- Full name: FK Košice-Barca
- Founded: 1926
- Dissolved: 2018
- Ground: Štadión Barca, Košice-Barca
- Capacity: 800

FK Košice-Barca was a Slovak football club, based in Barca, a city part of Košice, Slovakia. The club was founded in 1926 and dissolved after merging with FK Košice (former Vyšné Opátske team) in June 2018.
