= Martin Švec (footballer) =

Czech footballer (born 1984)

Personal information
- Full name: Martin Švec
- Date of birth: 26 March 1984 (age 42)
- Place of birth: Ostrava, Czechoslovakia
- Height: 1.85 m (6 ft 1 in)
- Position: Centre back

Team information
- Current team: Třinec
- Number: 13

Youth career
- Vítkovice

Senior career*
Years	Team	Apps	(Gls)
2003–2008	Vítkovice	47	(4)
2008–2009	Fulnek	11	(1)
2009–2010	Púchov		
2010–2011	Petržalka	46	(2)
2012	Spartak Trnava	0	(0)
2012–	Třinec	0	(0)
- * Club domestic league appearances and goals as of 25 May 2012 ‡ National team caps and goals as of 3 April 2011

Martin Švec (born 26 March 1984) is a Czech football defender who currently plays for FK Fotbal Třinec.

== Czech Second League ==
Švec played in the Czech 2. Liga for Fotbal Fulnek in the 2008–09 season.

== Spartak Trnava ==
In December 2011, he joined Slovak club FC Spartak Trnava on a two-year contract.
