= Tomáš Huber =

Czech footballer (born 1985)

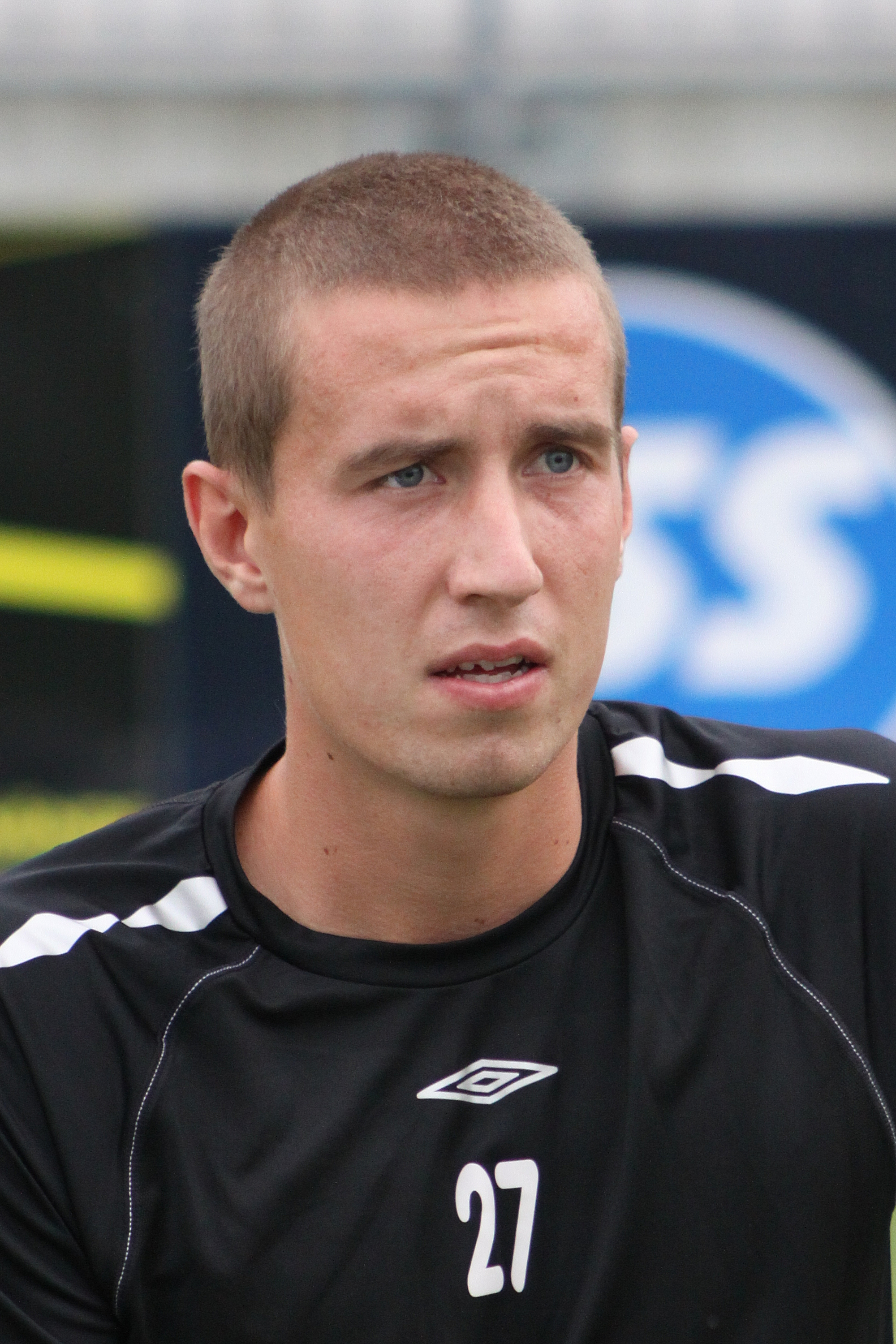

Personal information
- Date of birth: 29 August 1985 (age 41)
- Place of birth: Jablonec nad Nisou, Czechoslovakia
- Height: 1.92 m (6 ft 3 1/2 in)
- Position: Centre back

Youth career
- 1993–1997: FK Rumburk
- 1997–1999: Teplice
- 1999–2005: Jablonec

Senior career*
Years	Team	Apps	(Gls)
2006	→ OEZ Letohrad (loan)		
2007	Baník Sokolov	12	(0)
2007–2011	Jablonec	57	(3)
2009	→ Sparta Prague (loan)	8	(0)
2011	Ružomberok	12	(0)
2012–2014	DAC Dunajská Streda	51	(2)
- * Club domestic league appearances and goals as of 31 May 2012

Tomáš Huber (born 29 August 1985) is a former Czech professional football defender, who played for FK DAC 1904 Dunajská Streda.

In 2013, Huber, along with other Dunajská Streda players, was accused of accepting bribes for match fixing. Huber denied involvement in the scheme. For his role in the corruption scandal, Huber was banned from playing for 18 years.
