= Dolná Ždaňa =

Village and municipality in Slovakia

Dolná Ždaňa Alsózsadány
- Municipality
- Flag

- Location of Dolná Ždaňa in the Banská Bystrica Region Location of Dolná Ždaňa in Slovakia
- Coordinates: 48.55°N 18.77°E
- Country: Slovakia
- Region: Banská Bystrica Region
- District: Žiar nad Hronom District
- First mentioned: 1391

Area
  - Total: 8.16 km^{2} (3.15 sq mi)
- Elevation: 238 m (781 ft)

Population (2025)
  - Total: 884
- Time zone: UTC+1 (CET)
  - Summer (DST): UTC+2 (CEST)
- Postal code: 966 01
- Area code: +421 45
- Vehicle registration plate (until 2022): ZH
- Website: www.dolnazdana.sk

Dolná Ždaňa (Hungarian: Alsózsadány) is a village and municipality in Žiar nad Hronom District in the Banská Bystrica Region of central Slovakia.

== Geography ==
The municipality lies at an altitude of 238 metres (781 ft) and covers an area of 8.16 km^{2} (3.15 sq mi) (2025).

== History ==
In historical records, the village was first mentioned in 1391 (Sdan), when it belonged to Repište. In the 17th century, it passed to Banská Štiavnica’s Mine Chamber.

== Population ==
Population statistic (10 years)
Year	1995	2005	2015	2025
Count	598	678	891	884
Difference		+13.37%	+31.41%	−0.78%

Population statistic
Year	2024	2025
Count	878	884
Difference		+0.68%

It has a population of 884 people (31 December 2025).

=== Ethnicity ===
Census 2021 (1+ %)
Ethnicity	Number	Fraction
Slovak	786	92.68%
Not found out	55	6.48%
Romani	19	2.24%
Total	848	

In year 2021 was 848 people by ethnicity 786 as Slovak, 55 as Not found out, 19 as Romani, 7 as Other, 4 as Czech, 2 as Russian, 1 as Ukrainian, 1 as Polish and 1 as Hungarian.

Note on population: The difference values of population numbers in the table "Population statistic" and in the sections "Ethnicity" & "Religion" is caused by the use of various statistical methods.

=== Religion ===
Census 2021 (1+ %)
Religion	Number	Fraction
Roman Catholic Church	535	63.09%
None	212	25%
Not found out	60	7.08%
Evangelical Church	14	1.65%
Total	848	

In year 2021 was 848 people by religion 535 from Roman Catholic Church, 212 from None, 60 from Not found out, 14 from Evangelical Church, 8 from Jehovah's Witnesses, 4 from Greek Catholic Church, 3 from Christian Congregations in Slovakia, 3 from Other, 2 from Paganism and natural spirituality, 2 from Other and not ascertained christian church, 1 from Calvinist Church, 1 from Hinduism, 1 from United Methodist Church, 1 from Baptists Church and 1 from Ad hoc movements.

== Genealogical resources ==
The records for genealogical research are available at the state archive "Statny Archiv in Banska Bystrica, Slovakia"

- Roman Catholic church records (births/marriages/deaths): 1686-1895 (parish B)
- Lutheran church records (births/marriages/deaths): 1812-1895 (parish B)

== See also ==
- List of municipalities and towns in Slovakia
