= Marek Janečka =

Slovak footballer

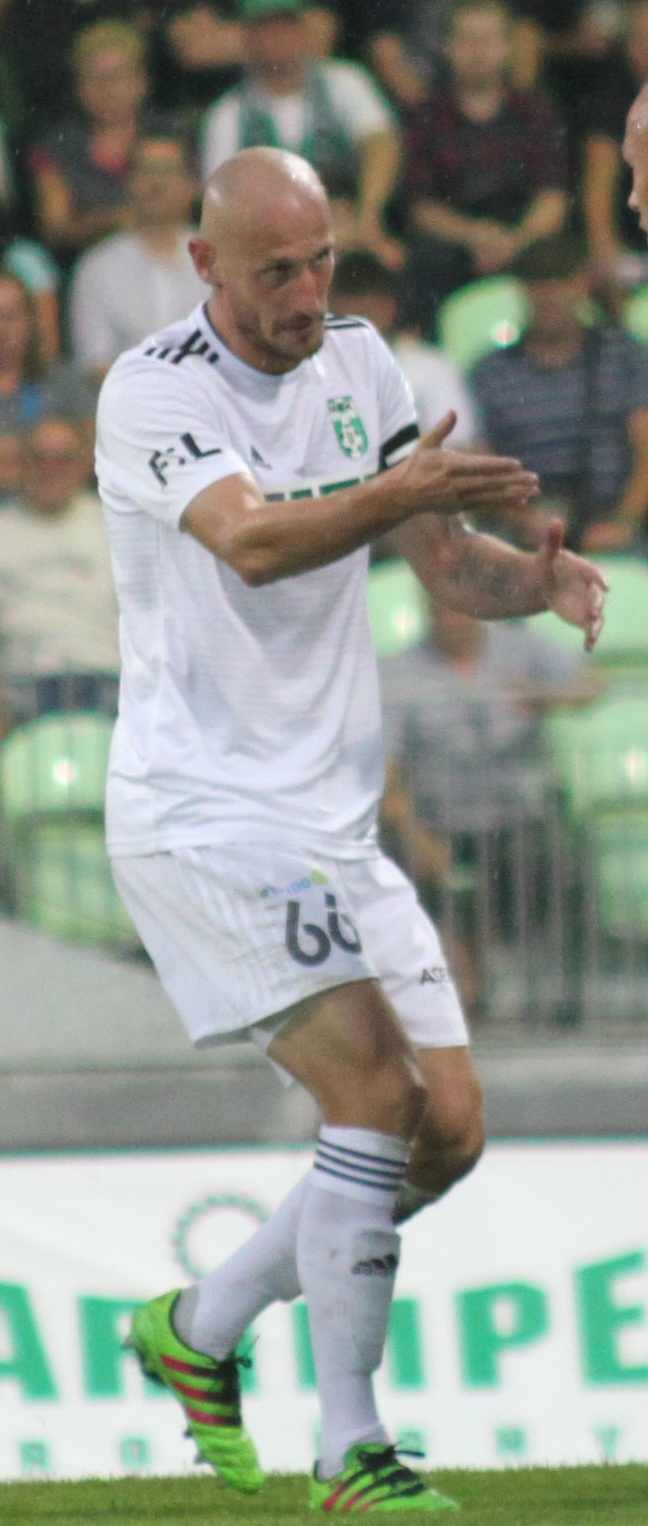

Personal information
- Full name: Marek Janečka
- Date of birth: 9 June 1983 (age 43)
- Place of birth: Levoča, Czechoslovakia
- Height: 1.82 m (6 ft 0 in)
- Positions: Defender; defensive midfielder

Youth career
- FK Levoča
- Spišská Nová Ves

Senior career*
| Years | Team | Apps | (Gls) |
| 2001–2002 | Spišská Nová Ves | | |
| 2002–2003 | FK Harichovce | | |
| 2004–2006 | Spišská Nová Ves | | |
| 2006–2008 | Rimavská Sobota | | |
| 2008–2009 | Dukla Banská Bystrica | 10 | (0) |
| 2009 | → Rimavská Sobota (loan) | | |
| 2010–2012 | Zlaté Moravce | 48 | (2) |
| 2012 | → Hansa Rostock (loan) | 15 | (0) |
| 2012–2015 | Spartak Trnava | 94 | (2) |
| 2015 | Podbrezová | 0 | (0) |
| 2015 | → Spartak Trnava (loan) | 17 | (1) |
| 2016–2018 | Karviná | 85 | (7) |
| 2019 | Spartak Trnava | 14 | (0) |
| 2019–2021 | Karviná | 36 | (1) |
| 2021– | Spišská Nová Ves | ? | (?) |

Managerial career
- 2021–: Spišská Nová Ves (assistant)
- * Club domestic league appearances and goals as of 7 June 2023

Marek Janečka (born 9 June 1983) is a Slovak footballer who plays for Spišská Nová Ves as a defender.

== Club career ==
Janečka was signed by Spartak Trnava in July 2012. He made his league debut for them against Košice on 14 July 2012.

In January 2016, he joined Czech side Karviná.

== Honours ==
Spartak Trnava

- Slovak Cup: 2018–19
