= Ľubomír Gogolák =

Slovak footballer

Personal information
- Full name: Ľubomír Gogolák
- Date of birth: 24 February 1990 (age 36)
- Place of birth: Trnava, Czechoslovakia
- Height: 1.87 m (6 ft 2 in)
- Position: Forward

Team information
- Current team: SC Marchegg
- Number: 9

Youth career
- Lokomotíva Trnava

Senior career*
Years	Team	Apps	(Gls)
2009–2013	Spartak Trnava	16	(2)
2010	→ Šaľa (loan)		
2012–2013	→ SFM Senec (loan)	35	(8)
2013–2015	SC Marchegg	42	(29)
2015–2016	OFK Malženice		
2017–2021	SC Marchegg	74	(43)
2021–2022	SV Hundsheim	17	(22)
2022–	SC Marchegg	14	(5)
- * Club domestic league appearances and goals as of 16:52, 12 March 2023 (UTC)

Ľubomír Gogolák (born 24 February 1990) is a Slovak football striker who plays for SC Marchegg in Austria.

He came to Spartak Trnava from the youth squad of Lokomotíva Trnava in the summer of 2009. In 2012 he was loaned out to SFM Senec.
