= Lukáš Zelenický =

Slovak footballer

Personal information
- Full name: Lukáš Zelenický
- Date of birth: 10 April 1990 (age 36)
- Place of birth: Czechoslovakia
- Height: 1.81 m (5 ft 11 1/2 in)
- Position: Right back

Team information
- Current team: SVg Pitten
- Number: 14

Youth career
- Nitra

Senior career*
| Years | Team | Apps | (Gls) |
| 2011–2012 | Nitra | 19 | (0) |
| 2012 | → Piešťany (loan) | 0 | (0) |
| 2013 | Union Perg | | |
| 2014 | Gabčíkovo | | |
| 2014–2016 | Baník Prievidza | | |
| 2016–2017 | ASKÖ Pregarten | | |
| 2017–2018 | SPG Pregarten | | |
| 2018– | SVg Pitten | | |

International career
| 2008–2009 | Slovakia U-19 | 9 | (2) |
| 2011 | Slovakia U-21 | 1 | (0) |
- * Club domestic league appearances and goals as of 13:42, 26 October 2020 (UTC)

Lukáš Zelenický (born 10 April 1990) is a Slovak football midfielder who currently plays for SVg Pitten.
