= Róbert Szegedi =

Slovak footballer

Personal information
- Full name: Róbert Szegedi
- Date of birth: 26 May 1985 (age 41)
- Place of birth: Czechoslovakia
- Height: 1.78 m (5 ft 10 in)
- Position: Midfielder

Team information
- Current team: ŠKF Sereď
- Number: 16

Youth career
- Inter Bratislava

Senior career*
Years	Team	Apps	(Gls)
2004–2009	Inter Bratislava	4	(0)
2007	→LAFC Lučenec "loan"		
2009–	1. FC Brno	6	(0)
2010	→LAFC Lučenec "loan"		
2010–2011	→FK Senica "loan"	9	(0)
2011–2012	Lučenec	10	(2)
2013–	→ Sereď (loan)	0	(0)
- * Club domestic league appearances and goals as of 16 February 2013

Róbert Szegedi (born 26 May 1985) is a Slovak football player of Hungarian ethnic origin who currently plays for Slovak 3. liga club ŠKF Sereď.
