= Ľuboš Chmelík =

Slovak footballer

Personal information
- Full name: Ľuboš Chmelík
- Date of birth: 1 May 1989 (age 37)
- Place of birth: Ilava, Czechoslovakia
- Height: 1.86 m (6 ft 1 in)
- Position: Centre back

Youth career
- Dubnica

Senior career*
Years	Team	Apps	(Gls)
2008–2009	Dubnica	23	(2)
2009–2011	→Banská Bystrica (loan)	28	(1)
2011–2012	Dubnica	16	(0)

International career
2009	Slovakia U-21	2	(0)
- * Club domestic league appearances and goals as of 1 June 2012

Ľuboš Chmelík (1 May 1989) is a Slovak footballer who plays as a central defender.
