= Andrej Hodek =

Slovak footballer

Personal information
- Full name: Andrej Hodek
- Date of birth: 24 May 1981 (age 45)
- Place of birth: Bratislava, Czechoslovakia
- Height: 1.87 m (6 ft 2 in)
- Position: Forward

Youth career
- Inter Bratislava

Senior career*
Years	Team	Apps	(Gls)
2000–2003	Ekonóm Bratislava		
2003–2009	Inter Bratislava	48	(8)
2004	→ Báč (loan)		
2009	Petržalka	19	(6)
2010–2011	Brno	17	(2)
2011–2013	Zlaté Moravce	61	(18)
2013–2014	Spartak Trnava	26	(6)
2014–2017	ASK Mannersdorf	80	(51)
2018–20XX	Slovenský Grob		
- * Club domestic league appearances and goals

Andrej Hodek (born 24 May 1981) is a Slovak football forward.

He was signed by Trnava in summer 2013 and made his debut for them against Senica on 13 July 2013.
