= Ján Petráš =

Slovak footballer

Personal information
- Full name: Ján Petráš
- Date of birth: 18 February 1986 (age 40)
- Place of birth: Bardejov, Czechoslovakia
- Height: 1.76 m (5 ft 9 in)
- Position: Midfielder

Youth career
- Bardejov
- Slovan Bratislava

Senior career*
Years	Team	Apps	(Gls)
2006–2010	Bardejov		
2011–2014	Spartak Trnava	15	(1)
2012	→ Myjava (loan)	24	(3)
2013–2014	→ Bardejov (loan)	0	(0)
- * Club domestic league appearances and goals as of 8 January 2013

Ján Petráš (born 18 February 1986) is a Slovak football midfielder who currently plays for Partizán Bardejov.

He came to Trnava in January 2011.
