= Dušan Uškovič =

Slovak footballer

Personal information
- Full name: Dušan Uškovič
- Date of birth: 9 April 1985 (age 41)
- Place of birth: Prešov, Czechoslovakia
- Height: 1.86 m (6 ft 1 in)
- Position: Striker

Youth career
- Prievidza

Senior career*
| Years | Team | Apps | (Gls) |
| ?–2008 | Prievidza | - | (-) |
| 2005–2006 | → Rimavská Sobota (loan) | - | (-) |
| 2008–2012 | Banská Bystrica | 88 | (27) |
| 2012 | → Michalovce (loan) | 15 | (3) |
| 2012–2013 | Hradec Králové | 21 | (6) |
- * Club domestic league appearances and goals as of 26 October 2012

Dušan Uškovič (born 9 April 1985) is a Slovak footballer who plays as a striker who last played for FC Hradec Králové.
