= Martin Luhový =

Slovak footballer

Personal information
- Full name: Martin Luhový
- Date of birth: 9 October 1985 (age 41)
- Place of birth: Púchov, Czechoslovakia
- Height: 1.87 m (6 ft 1 1/2 in)
- Position: Forward

Youth career
- Púchov

Senior career*
Years	Team	Apps	(Gls)
–2010	Púchov		
2010–2011	FC Petržalka 1898	41	(6)
2012	ViOn Zlaté Moravce	12	(2)
2012–2016	TJ Iskra Borčice		
- * Club domestic league appearances and goals as of 11 June 2015

Martin Luhový (born 9 October 1985 in Púchov) is a retired Slovak football forward.
