= ŠK Senec =

- Full name: Športový klub Senec
- Nickname: Senčania
- Founded: 1994
- Dissolved: 2016 (became ŠK 1923 Gabčíkovo)
- Ground: NTC Stadion
- Capacity: 3.264 (seats)
- 2015–16: 2. liga Play-out round , 6th (relegated)
- Website: www.sfmsenec.eu
Home colours	Away colours

ŠK Senec was a Slovak soccer club based in Senec, and founded in 1994. The club has played in Slovak Second Football League. Since 1999 the club has organized an annual youth soccer tournament Senec District and friends, which in the past ten years has involved 15,940 children. The club license of ŠK Senec was bought by city of Gabčíkovo and "ŠK Senec" as a club folded.

== Clubname history ==
- ŠK SFM Senec 1994–2014
- ŠK Senec 2014–2016

== Affiliated clubs ==
The following clubs were affiliated with ŠK.

- (Slovakia) FC DAC 1904 Dunajská Streda (2013–2016)

== Notable players ==
Had international caps for their respective countries. Players whose name is listed in bold represented their countries while playing for Senec.

- (Central African Republic) **Jésus Konnsimbal**
- (Slovakia) Pavol Majerník
- (Slovakia) Juraj Piroska

== Notable Managers ==
- (Slovakia) Branislav Kriška (2008–2010)
- (Slovakia) Mikuláš Radványi (2011)
- (Slovakia) Anton Jánoš (2011–2013)
- (Slovakia) Marián Tibenský (2013)
- (Slovakia) Andrej Štellár (15.10.2013–7.1.2016)

== Sources ==
ŠK Senec – Official Site
