= 2012–13 2. Liga (Slovakia) =

2. liga
- Season: 2012–13
- Champions: DAC Dunajská Streda
- Relegated: MFK Dolný Kubín; TJ Baník Ružiná
- Matches: 198
- Goals: 453 (2.29 per match)
- Top goalscorer: Hector Tubonemi (19 goals)
- Biggest home win: Partizán Bardejov 4–0 Rimavská Sobota; Slovan Duslo Šaľa 5–1 Baník Ružiná; SFM Senec 4–0 Rimavská Sobota; Liptovský Mikuláš 4–0 Zemplín Michalovce
- Biggest away win: Dolný Kubín 1–4 SFM Senec
- Highest scoring: Zemplín Michalovce 4–3 Partizán Bardejov
- Highest attendance: Zemplín Michalovce 0–1 Podbrezová (2,230)
- Lowest attendance: Šamorín 0–1 Bardejov (140)

The 2012–13 2. Liga (Slovakia) season was the 20th season of the second tier 2. Liga annual football tournament in Slovakia, since its establishment in 1993.

Twelve teams compete in the league, with bottom two sides being relegated to the Slovak third level.

== Changes from last season ==
=== Team changes ===
- Spartak Myjava were promoted to the Slovak First Football League after the 2011–12 season.
- DAC Dunajská Streda were relegated from the Slovak First Football League after the 2011–12 season.
- Slovan Duslo Šaľa, Partizán Bardejov Šamorín, and Baník Ružiná were promoted from the Slovak Third Football League after the 2011–12 season.
- Bodva Moldava and Ružomberok B were excluded from the league after the 2011–12 season.

== Teams ==
=== Stadia and locations ===
Location of teams in Slovak 2. liga 2012–13

Team	Home city	Stadium	Capacity	2011–12 season
Dunajská Streda	Dunajská Streda	DAC stadium	3,170	12th in Corgoň Liga
Dolný Kubín	Dolný Kubín	Stadium MUDr. Ivan Chodák	1,950	3rd in 2. liga
Dubnica	Dubnica	Mestský štadión	5,450	8th in 2. liga
Liptovský Mikuláš	Liptovský Mikuláš	Stadium Liptovský Mikuláš	1,950	10th in 2. liga
Zemplín Michalovce	Michalovce	Zemplin Stadium	4,620	6th in 2. liga
Podbrezová	Podbrezová	Stadium Kolkáreň	4,500	2nd in 2. liga
Rimavská Sobota	Rimavská Sobota	Na Záhradkách Stadium	1,970	5th in 2. liga
SFM Senec	Senec	NTC Stadium	3,264	4th in 2. liga
Slovan Duslo Šaľa	Šaľa	Šaľa Stadium	1,126	3. liga Champions (West)
Partizán Bardejov	Bardejov	Stadium mestský Bardejov	3,040	3. liga Champions (East)
Šamorín	Šamorín	Pomlé Stadium	1,950	3. liga Play-off winner
Baník Ružiná	Ružiná	TJ Baník Stadium	1,200	3. liga Play-off runners-up

== League table ==
Pos	Team	Pld	W	D	L	GF	GA	GD	Pts	Promotion or relegation
1	DAC Dunajská Streda (C, P)	33	19	8	6	41	26	+15	65	Promotion to Corgoň Liga
2	Podbrezová	33	16	13	4	45	20	+25	61	
3	SFM Senec	33	16	9	8	48	32	+16	57	
4	Bardejov	33	16	5	12	41	36	+5	53	
5	Zemplín Michalovce	33	12	7	14	41	43	−2	43	
6	Šamorín	33	10	11	12	29	32	−3	41	
7	Šaľa	33	12	5	16	41	45	−4	41	
8	Dubnica	33	11	8	14	31	38	−7	41	
9	Rimavská Sobota	33	11	7	15	39	47	−8	40	
10	Liptovský Mikuláš	33	9	9	15	26	39	−13	36	
11	Dolný Kubín (R)	33	7	13	13	34	42	−8	34	Relegation to 3. liga
12	Ružiná (R)	33	7	9	17	38	54	−16	30	Relegation to 3. liga

Source: LIGA.cz (in Czech)
Rules for classification: 1) points; 2) goal difference; 3) number of goals scored.
(C) Champions; (P) Promoted; (R) Relegated

== Results ==
The schedule consisted of three rounds. The two first rounds consisted of a conventional home and away round-robin schedule. The pairings of the third round were set according to the 2011–12 final standings. Every team played each opponent once for a total of 11 games per team.

=== First and second round ===
Home \ Away	BRU	DOL	DUB	DAC	LMI	PAR	POD	RIM	SAM	SEN	ŠAĽ	ZMI
Baník Ružiná		0–0	0–2	1–2	0–0	1–2	1–2	0–0	3–0	2–0	3–0	1–2
Dolný Kubín	0–0		2–0	1–2	0–1	1–0	2–2	0–0	1–1	1–4	2–4	3–1
Dubnica	4–1	0–2		0–0	3–0	1–0	0–0	0–2	2–1	1–2	0–0	1–2
DAC Dunajská Streda	3–2	1–2	1–2		3–0	2–1	1–1	3–2	0–0	1–0	2–1	2–1
Liptovský Mikuláš	1–1	0–0	0–0	1–0		0–2	0–0	2–1	2–0	0–1	0–1	4–0
Partizán Bardejov	1–0	1–1	3–1	1–0	1–0		2–2	4–0	2–1	2–0	2–1	1–0
Podbrezová	4–1	1–1	2–0	0–1	3–0	1–0		1–0	2–0	1–1	3–1	2–0
Rimavská Sobota	1–1	2–2	2–1	0–1	4–1	4–2	0–2		0–2	0–0	1–0	1–3
Šamorín	2–2	2–0	0–2	0–0	2–0	1–1	0–0	2–0		0–2	1–0	0–0
SFM Senec	2–0	2–1	1–1	0–1	0–0	3–0	1–0	4–0	1–1		0–1	2–2
Šaľa	5–1	2–0	1–3	1–2	2–1	2–0	1–1	1–1	0–2	0–1		3–1
Zemplín Michalovce	2–0	1–1	2–1	1–0	1–0	4–3	0–1	1–2	0–0	0–2	1–2	

Source: LIGA.cz (in Czech)
Legend: Blue = home team win; Yellow = draw; Red = away team win.

=== Third round ===
Key numbers for pairing determination (number marks position in 2011–12 final standings):

23rd round	24th round	25th round	26th round	27th round	28th round
1 – 12	1 – 2	2 – 12	1 – 4	3 – 12	1 – 6
2 – 11	8 – 6	3 – 1	2 – 3	4 – 2	2 – 5
3 – 10	9 – 5	4 – 11	9 – 7	5 – 1	3 – 4
4 – 9	10 – 4	5 – 10	10 – 6	6 – 11	10 – 8
5 – 8	11 – 3	6 – 9	11 – 5	7 – 10	11 – 7
6 – 7	12 – 7	7 – 8	12 – 8	8 – 9	12 – 9

29th round	30th round	31st round	32nd round	33rd round
4 – 12	1 – 8	5 – 12	1 – 10	6 – 12
5 – 3	2 – 7	6 – 4	2 – 9	7 – 5
6 – 2	3 – 6	7 – 3	3 – 8	8 – 4
7 – 1	4 – 5	8 – 2	4 – 7	9 – 3
8 – 11	11 – 9	9 – 1	5 – 6	10 – 2
9 – 10	12 – 10	10 – 11	12 – 11	11 – 1

Home \ Away	BRU	DOL	DUB	DAC	LMI	PAR	POD	RIM	SAM	SEN	ŠAĽ	ZMI
Baník Ružiná					3–1	2–1	0–4			2–3		1–3
Dolný Kubín	0–2			1–2					1–1	1–2	3–1	2–2
Dubnica	0–4	1–0		0–1				3–2			0–0	
DAC Dunajská Streda	1–1						0–0		1–0	2–1	1–1	2–1
Liptovský Mikuláš		2–1	3–0	2–1				1–2			3–1	
Partizán Bardejov		1–0	1–0	1–1	1–1			0–1				
Podbrezová		1–1	0–1		0–0	0–1		2–1	2–0			
Rimavská Sobota	3–1	0–1		0–1					2–0		2–1	0–0
Šamorín	0–0		2–0		3–0	2–0					2–0	
SFM Senec			1–1		0–0	0–1	1–1	4–3	4–1			
Šaľa	3–1					0–3	0–1			4–1		1–0
Zemplín Michalovce			0–0		2–0	3–0	2–3		2–0	1–2		

Source: LIGA.cz (in Czech)
Legend: Blue = home team win; Yellow = draw; Red = away team win.

== Top goalscorers ==
Updated through matches played 1 June 2013.

Rank	Player	Club	Goals
1	(Nigeria) Hector Tubonemi	ŽP Šport Podbrezová	19
2	(Serbia) Igor Ležaić	FC ŠTK 1914 Šamorín	14
3	(Slovakia) Ondrej Čurgali	Slovan Duslo Šaľa	12
4	(Slovakia) Róbert Ujčík	ŠK Senec(3)/Dolný Kubín(8)	11
5	(Slovakia) Martin Mikulič	ŠK Senec	10
5	(Slovakia) Andrej Brčák	Dolný Kubín	10
5	(Slovakia) Lukáš Szabó	Slovan Duslo Šaľa	10
8	(Slovakia) Stanislav Velický	DAC Dunajská Streda	9
9	(Slovakia) Roland Šmahajčík	MFK Dubnica	8
9	(Slovakia) Marek Seman	Bardejov	8
9	(Slovakia) Mário Kurák	Ružiná	8
9	(Slovakia) Pavol Jurčo	Michalovce	8
9	(Slovakia) Marián Adam	Rimavská Sobota	8

== See also ==
- 2012–13 Slovak First Football League
- 2012–13 3. Liga (Slovakia)

=== Stats ===
- List of transfers summer 2012
- List of transfers winter 2012–13
