= 2011–12 2. Liga (Slovakia) =

2. Liga
- Season: 2011–12
- Champions: Spartak Myjava
- Relegated: LAFC Lučenec; Petržalka
- Matches: 198
- Goals: 470 (2.37 per match)
- Top goalscorer: Tomáš Čekovský; Peter Sládek (14 goals)
- Biggest home win: Podbrezová 7–0 Moldava; Podbrezová 7–0 LAFC Lučenec
- Biggest away win: Petržalka 0–5 Spartak Myjava
- Highest scoring: Podbrezová 7–0 Bodva Moldava; Podbrezová 7–0 LAFC Lučenec; Dolný Kubín 4–3 Rimavská Sobota; Spartak Myjava 6-1 Petržalka
- Highest attendance: Zemplín Michalovce 1–4 Spartak Myjava (2,620)
- Lowest attendance: Petržalka 2–3 Liptovský Mikuláš (130)

The 2011–12 2. Liga (Slovakia) season was the 19th edition of the second tier of the 2. Liga annual football tournament in Slovakia, since its establishment in 1993. It began in late July 2011 and ended in May 2012.

== Team changes from 2010–11 ==
- Trenčín were promoted to the Slovak First Football League after the 2010–11 season.
- Dubnica were relegated from the Slovak First Football League after the 2010–11 season.
- Spartak Myjava and Podbrezová were promoted from the Slovak Third Football League after the 2010–11 season.
- Šaľa and Púchov were relegated to the Slovak Third Football League after the 2010–11 season.

== Teams ==
=== Stadiums and locations ===
Location of teams in Slovak II. liga 2011–12

Team	Location	Stadium	Capacity
Dubnica	Dubnica	Mestský štadión	5,450
Petržalka	Petržalka	Štadión Rapid	3,000
Bodva Moldava	Moldava nad Bodvou	Steel Slovakia aréna	2,500
Liptovský Mikuláš	Liptovský Mikuláš	Stadium Liptovský Mikuláš	1,950
SFM Senec	Senec	Národné tréningové centrum	3,264
LAFC Lučenec	Lučenec	Štadión v parku	5,000
Zemplín Michalovce	Michalovce	Štadión MFK	4,500
Dolný Kubín	Dolný Kubín	Stadium MUDr. Ivan Chodák	1,950
Rimavská Sobota	Rimavská Sobota	Na Záhradkách	5,000
Spartak Myjava	Myjava	Stadium Myjava	2,000
Podbrezová	Brezno	Štadión MŠK Brezno	5,000
Ružomberok B	Ružomberok	Štadión pod Čebraťom	4,817

== League table ==
Pos	Team	Pld	W	D	L	GF	GA	GD	Pts	Promotion or relegation
1	Myjava (C, P)	33	20	11	2	64	16	+48	71	Promotion to Corgoň Liga
2	Podbrezová	33	18	11	4	53	19	+34	65	
3	Dolný Kubín	33	15	6	12	43	42	+1	51	
4	SFM Senec	33	13	11	9	41	33	+8	50	
5	Rimavská Sobota	33	13	9	11	42	42	0	48	
6	Zemplín Michalovce	33	13	7	13	41	46	−5	46	
7	Ružomberok B	33	12	9	12	42	39	+3	45	
8	Dubnica	33	10	13	10	32	31	+1	43	
9	Moldava	33	9	15	9	30	35	−5	42	
10	Liptovský Mikuláš	33	10	5	18	34	48	−14	35	
11	Lučenec (R)	33	6	6	21	26	65	−39	24	Relegation to 3. Liga
12	Petržalka (R)	33	4	7	22	22	54	−32	19	Relegation to 3. Liga

Source: LIGA.cz (in Czech)
Rules for classification: 1) points; 2) goal difference; 3) number of goals scored.
(C) Champions; (P) Promoted; (R) Relegated

== Results ==
The schedule consisted of three rounds. The two first rounds consisted of a conventional home and away round-robin schedule. The pairings of the third round were set according to the 2010–11 final standings. Every team played each opponent once for a total of 11 games per team.

=== First and second round ===
Home \ Away	MOL	DOL	DUB	LUČ	LMI	PET	POD	RIM	RUB	SEN	MYJ	ZMI
Moldava		2–2	0–0	3–1	1–3	1–1	0–0	1–0	0–0	0–0	1–0	1–1
Dolný Kubín	2–2		0–0	2–0	2–0	1–0	1–0	4–0	1–0	2–1	0–2	0–1
Dubnica	1–1	0–0		3–0	1–1	0–0	0–0	0–1	1–0	2–0	0–0	0–1
Lučenec	0–0	0–2	2–3		2–1	3–0	1–2	1–2	1–0	1–1	2–2	2–0
Liptovský Mikuláš	0–1	0–3	1–0	0–0		2–1	1–1	2–2	1–2	1–1	0–2	1–2
Petržalka	0–1	2–0	2–2	0–1	1–2		0–0	3–1	1–0	1–1	0–5	2–0
Podbrezová	7–0	0–1	2–1	1–0	3–2	2–1		3–0	3–1	1–0	0–0	3–1
Rimavská Sobota	0–0	3–0	0–2	4–0	2–1	3–1	0–1		2–2	0–0	1–1	4–3
Ružomberok B	1–2	4–0	2–0	2–0	0–1	1–0	1–1	0–0		0–2	0–2	3–3
SFM Senec	2–1	2–1	0–0	3–1	2–0	0–0	1–2	2–0	2–2		0–3	2–1
Spartak Myjava	1–0	3–0	2–1	1–1	3–0	1–0	1–1	1–0	3–0	1–0		3–0
Zemplín Michalovce	1–0	0–0	0–0	2–1	1–3	1–0	3–0	3–0	2–3	2–2	1–0	

Source: LIGA.cz (in Czech)
Legend: Blue = home team win; Yellow = draw; Red = away team win.

=== Third round ===
Key numbers for pairing determination (number marks position in 2010–11 final standings):

23rd round	24th round	25th round	26th round	27th round	28th round
1–12	1–2	2–12	1–4	3–12	1–6
2–11	8–6	3–1	2–3	4–2	2–5
3–10	9–5	4–11	9–7	5–1	3–4
4–9	10–4	5–10	10–6	6–11	10–8
5–8	11–3	6–9	11–5	7–10	11–7
6–7	12–7	7–8	12–8	8–9	12–9

29th round	30th round	31st round	32nd round	33rd round
4–12	1–8	5–12	1–10	6–12
5–3	2–7	6–4	2–9	7–5
6–2	3–6	7–3	3–8	8–4
7–1	4–5	8–2	4–7	9–3
8–11	11–9	9–1	5–6	10–2
9–10	12–10	10–11	12–11	11–1

Home \ Away	MOL	DOL	DUB	LUČ	LMI	PET	POD	RIM	RUB	SEN	MYJ	ZMI
Moldava		3–1	1–1			4–1			1–1	3–1		
Dolný Kubín				3–1	2–0			4–3			2–2	2–4
Dubnica		2–1			3–1		0–0	0–2	1–2			2–1
Lučenec	0–0		1–2			2–0			0–2	1–4		
Liptovský Mikuláš	1–0			2–0			1–2	0–1			0–2	0–1
Petržalka		1–2	0–3		2–3		0–0		0–1			0–1
Podbrezová	2–0	0–1		7–0					3–0		1–1	
Rimavská Sobota	2–0			2–1		3–1	0–3			1–1	1–1	
Ružomberok B		3–1			2–1			0–0			1–1	4–0
SFM Senec		1–0	4–0		0–2	1–0	0–2		3–2			
Spartak Myjava	2–0		3–1	5–0		6–1				0–0		
Zemplín Michalovce	0–0			4–0			0–0	0–2		0–2	1–4	

Source: LIGA.cz (in Czech)
Legend: Blue = home team win; Yellow = draw; Red = away team win.

== Top scorers ==
Rank	Player	Club	Goals
1	(Slovakia) Tomáš Čekovský	Podbrezová	14
1	(Slovakia) Peter Sládek	Spartak Myjava	14
3	(Nigeria) Hector Tubonemi	Podbrezová	11
3	(Slovakia) Róbert Ujčík	Dolný Kubín	11
5	(Slovakia) Pavol Straka	Spartak Myjava	10
6	(Slovakia) Pavol Kosík	Spartak Myjava	9
7	(Slovakia) Michal Filo	Dubnica	8
7	(Slovakia) Filip Serečin	Michalovce (3)/ Ružomberok B (5)	8
9	(Slovakia) Martin Mikulič	Petržalka (1)/ SFM Senec (6)	7
9	(Slovakia) Pavol Sedlák	Rimavská Sobota	7

== See also ==
- 2011–12 Slovak First Football League
- 2011–12 3. Liga (Slovakia)
