= Andač =

Andač (Zbehy)
- Neighbourhood
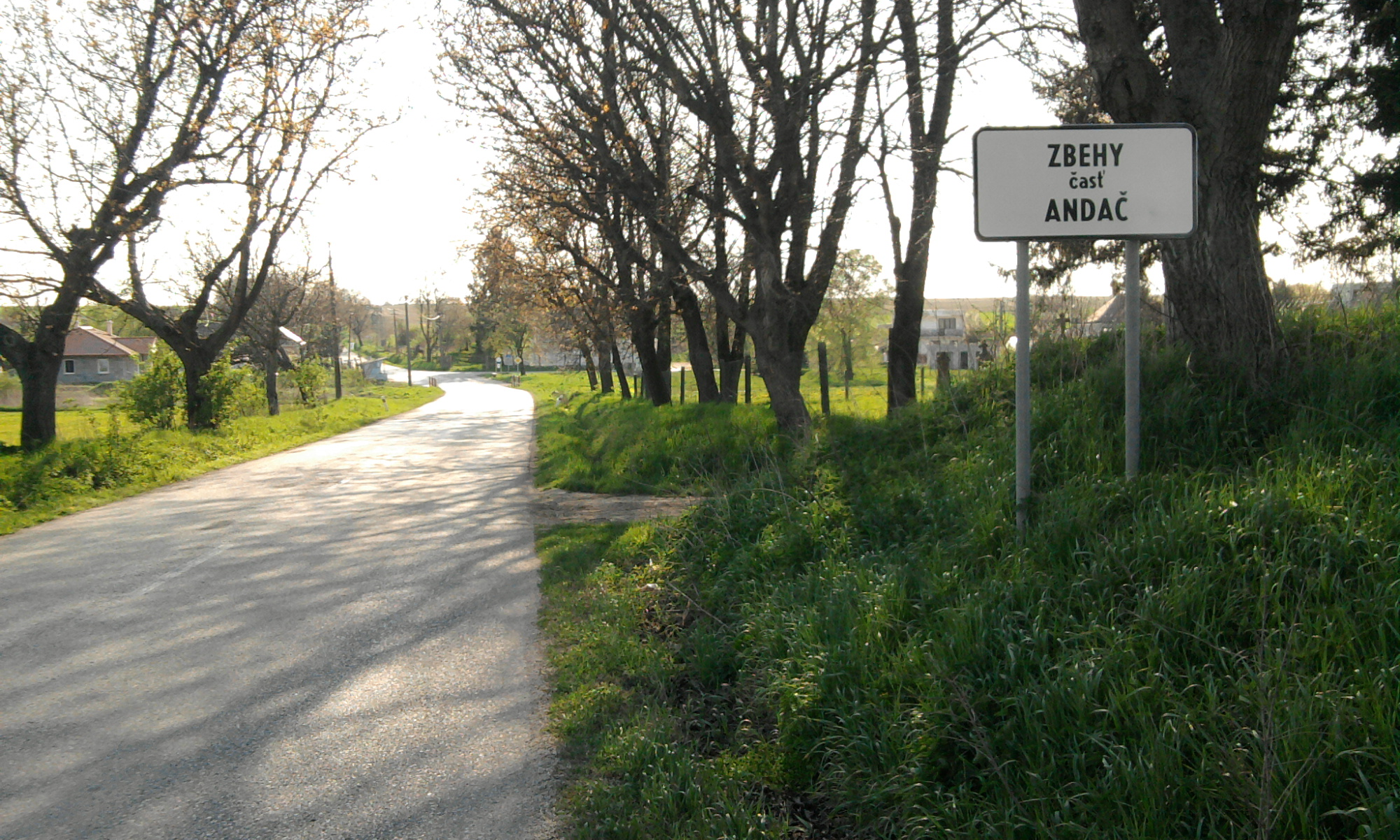
- Interactive map of Andač (Zbehy)
- Coordinates: 48°22′23″N 17°58′30″E
- Country: Slovakia
- Region: Nitra
- District: Nitra
- Municipality: Zbehy

Government

Area
  - Total: 294 km^{2} (114 sq mi)
- Elevation: 154 m (505 ft)

Population (1.9.2010)
  - Total: 254
  - Density: 0.864/km^{2} (2.24/sq mi)
- Postal code: 95142
- Website: andac.wbl.sk

Zbehy-Andač (Hungarian: Kisandacs) is a neighbourhood of the village and municipality Zbehy located in the Nitra district, Slovakia. The total area is approximately 294 ha.

It is located in the Nitra Hills on Sliváš brook and close to Andač brook, on the right hand side of the road from Zbehy to Alekšince. There is a chapel built in the second half of 20th century. The main at the cemeterycross dates back to 1818.

This neighbourhood has a population of approximately 300. The amenities include a community center with a library, a supermarket, a playground and a pub. There is Tŕnie (osada) farm nearby the village, however, it officially falls under the municipality of Lukáčovce.

Approximately 700m west of the neighbourhood, there is a train stop on the railroad from Leopoldov to Nitra. Zbehy-Andač borders with the municipalities of Zbehy, Alekšince and Lukáčovce.
