= Baník =

Baník is a Slovak word meaning "miner". Since the 1950s it has been part of the name of various sports clubs in Czechoslovakia associated mostly with coal mining regions. In Poland, the same practice was conducted with the name górnik.

Baník still serves as a name of various sport clubs in the Czech Republic and Slovakia:

== Sports clubs in the Czech Republic ==
- FC Baník Ostrava, from Ostrava
  - FC Baník Ostrava (women)
- FK Pelikán Děčín, known as DSO Baník Děčín 1953–1957 and TJ Baník Děčín 1957–1958, from Děčín
- MFK Havířov, formerly known as Baník Havířov, from Havířov
- SK Kladno, known as DSO Baník Kladno 1953–1958 and TJ Baník Kladno 1960–1961, from Kladno
- FK Baník Most 1909, from Most
- DHK Baník Most
- SK Sigma Olomouc, known as DSO Baník MŹ Olomouc 1953–1960, from Olomouc
- SFC Opava, known as TJ Baník Opava 1953–1958, from Opava
- FK Baník Ratíškovice, from Ratíškovice
- FK Baník Sokolov, from Sokolov
  - Stadion FK Baník Sokolov
- MFK Vítkovice, known as Baník Vítkovice 1953–1957, from Vítkovice
- HCB Karviná, or Handball Club Baník Karviná

== Sports clubs in Slovakia ==
- FC Baník Prievidza, 1954–1994 and 1998–2003, from Prievidza
- BC Prievidza, known as Baník Cígeľ Prievidza 1964–2004
- TJ Baník Ružiná, from Ružiná
- FC Baník Veľký Krtíš
- TJ Baník Kalinovo
- TJ Baník Ružiná
  - TJ Baník Stadium
- MBK Baník Handlová

== See also ==
- The dictionary definition of baník at Wiktionary
- Baníkov, a mountain in Slovakia
