= Ján Štajer =

Slovak footballer

Personal information
- Full name: Ján Štajer
- Date of birth: 18 February 1982 (age 44)
- Place of birth: Alekšince, Czechoslovakia
- Height: 1.78 m (5 ft 10 in)
- Position: Centre back

Team information
- Current team: Ružiná

Youth career
- ?–1999: FC Nitra

Senior career*
| Years | Team | Apps | (Gls) |
| 1999–2009 | FC Nitra | 96 | (6) |
| 2003–2004 | → OFK Veľký Lapáš (loan) | | |
| 2010–2011 | MFK Karviná | 20 | (1) |
| 2011 | → DAC Dunajská Streda (loan) | 5 | (1) |
| 2012– | → Ružiná (loan) | 0 | (0) |
- * Club domestic league appearances and goals as of 9 August 2012

Ján Štajer (born 18 February 1982 in Alekšince) is a Slovak football defender who recently played for the 2. liga club FK Baník Ružiná (he joined in 2012).
