= 2012–13 Slovak First Football League =

Corgoň Liga
- Season: 2012–13
- Dates: 14 July 2012 – 26 May 2013
- Champions: Slovan Bratislava; 7th title
- Relegated: Tatran Prešov
- Champions League: Slovan Bratislava
- Europa League: Senica; Trenčín; Žilina
- Matches: 198
- Goals: 466 (2.35 per match)
- Top goalscorer: David Depetris (16 goals)
- Biggest home win: Trenčín 6–0 Trnava
- Biggest away win: Trnava 0–5 Z.Moravce
- Highest scoring: Slovan 5–2 Nitra
- Highest attendance: 8,544; Trnava 0–1 Slovan
- Lowest attendance: 310; Nitra 1–1 Zlaté Moravce
- Average attendance: ▼2,116

The 2012–13 Slovak First Football League season, known as the Slovak Corgoň Liga for sponsorship reasons, was the 20th edition of top flight football league in Slovakia, since its establishment in 1993. It started on 14 July 2012 and ended on 26 May 2013.

MŠK Žilina were the 2012 defending champions.

== Teams ==
12 teams contested in the league, including 11 sides from the 2011–12 season and one promoted from the 2. liga. Spartak Myjava made their debut in the Slovak First Football League having won promotion the previous season. They replaced DAC Dunajská Streda.

=== Stadiums and locations ===
Location of teams in Corgoň Liga 2012–13

Team	Home city	Stadium	Capacity	2011–12 season
AS Trenčín	Trenčín	Stadium na Sihoti	4,500	5th in Corgoň Liga
Dukla Banská Bystrica	Banská Bystrica	SNP Stadium	10,000	9th in Corgoň Liga
FC Nitra	Nitra	Stadium pod Zoborom	11,384	8th in Corgoň Liga
FK Senica	Senica	Stadium FK Senica	4,500	4th in Corgoň Liga
MFK Košice	Košice	Stadium Lokomotívy v Čermeli	9,000	11th in Corgoň Liga
MFK Ružomberok	Ružomberok	Stadium MFK Ružomberok	4,817	6th in Corgoň Liga
MŠK Žilina	Žilina	Stadium pod Dubňom	11,181	Corgoň Liga champions
Slovan Bratislava	Bratislava	Pasienky	12,000	3rd in Corgoň Liga
Spartak Myjava	Myjava	Stadium Myjava	2,000	2. liga champions
Spartak Trnava	Trnava	Stadium Antona Malatinského	18,448	Corgoň Liga runners-up
Tatran Prešov	Prešov	Tatran Stadium	5,410	10th in Corgoň Liga
ViOn Zlaté Moravce	Zlaté Moravce	FC ViOn Stadium	4,000	7th in Corgoň Liga

=== Personnel and sponsorship ===
Team	President	Manager	Captain	Kitmaker	Shirt sponsor
AS Trenčín	(Netherlands) Tscheu La Ling	(Slovakia) Adrián Guľa	(Slovakia) Miloš Volešák	Nike	Aegon
Dukla Banská Bystrica	(Slovakia) Tomáš Geist	(Slovakia) Norbert Hrnčár	(Slovakia) Martin Poljovka	adidas	Express Slovakia
FC Nitra	(Slovakia) Eugen Árvay	(Slovakia) Jozef Vukušič	(Czech Republic) Petr Kaspřák	Jako	Bonul Security, El Comp, Špeciál Izotex
FK Senica	(Slovakia) Viktor Blažek	(Slovakia) Vladimír Koník	(Slovakia) Tomáš Kóňa	hummel	
MFK Košice	(Slovakia) Blažej Podolák	(Slovakia) Ján Kozák	(Slovakia) Peter Šinglár	Nike	Steel Trans
MFK Ružomberok	(Slovakia) Milan Fiľo	(Slovakia) Ladislav Šimčo	(Slovakia) Tomáš Ďubek	Adidas	Mondi SCP
MŠK Žilina	(Slovakia) Jozef Antošík	(Slovakia) Štefan Tarkovič	(Slovakia) Miroslav Barčík	Nike	Preto
Slovan Bratislava	(Slovakia) Ivan Kmotrík	(Slovakia) Samuel Slovák	(Slovakia) Igor Žofčák	adidas	Niké
Spartak Myjava	(Slovakia) Pavel Halabrín	(Slovakia) Ladislav Hudec	(Slovakia) Martin Černáček	Uhlsport	NAD RESS
Spartak Trnava	(Slovakia) Michal Pethö	(Slovakia) Vladimír Ekhardt	(Slovakia) Miroslav Karhan	Adidas	Danube Wings.eu, ŽOS Trnava
Tatran Prešov	(Slovakia) Miroslav Remeta	(Slovakia) Jozef Bubenko	(Slovakia) Peter Petráš	adidas	DÚHA
ViOn Zlaté Moravce	(Slovakia) Karol Škula	(Slovakia) Juraj Jarábek	(Slovakia) Pavol Majerník	Legea	ViOn

Adidas is the official ball supplier for Corgoň Liga.

=== Managerial changes ===
Team	Outgoing manager	Manner of departure	Date of vacancy	Position in table	Replaced by	Date of appointment
FK Senica	(Slovakia) Stanislav Griga	Mutual consent	26 April 2012	Pre-season	(Czech Republic) Zdeněk Psotka	4 May 2012
MFK Ružomberok	(Czech Republic) Aleš Křeček	End of contract	15 May 2012	Pre-season	(Slovakia) Ladislav Šimčo	4 June 2012
Dukla Banská Bystrica	(Slovakia) Štefan Zaťko	Sacked	23 May 2012	Pre-season	(Slovakia) Norbert Hrnčár	6 June 2012
1. FC Tatran Prešov	(Ukraine) Serhiy Kovalets	End of contract	30 June 2012	Pre-season	(Bulgaria) Angel Chervenkov	8 July 2012
ŠK Slovan Bratislava	(Slovakia) Vladimír Weiss	Resigned	29 July 2012	5th	(Slovakia) Samuel Slovák	3 August 2012
FC Nitra	(Slovakia) Ladislav Jurkemik	Sacked	5 November 2012	12th	(Slovakia) Jozef Vukušič	6 November 2012
FC Spartak Trnava	(Czech Republic) Pavel Hoftych	Resigned	18 November 2012	12th	(Slovakia) Peter Zelenský	19 November 2012
1. FC Tatran Prešov	(Bulgaria) Angel Chervenkov	Resigned	20 November 2012	11th	(Slovakia) Ladislav Totkovič	20 November 2012
FK Senica	(Czech Republic) Zdeněk Psotka	Mutual consent	3 January 2013	3rd	(Slovakia) Vladimír Koník	3 January 2013
MŠK Žilina	(Netherlands) Frans Adelaar	Sacked	3 January 2013	5th	(Slovakia) Štefan Tarkovič	3 January 2013
1. FC Tatran Prešov	(Slovakia) Ladislav Totkovič	Sacked	16 April 2013	10th	(Slovakia) Jozef Bubenko	16 April 2013
FC Spartak Trnava	(Slovakia) Peter Zelenský	Mutual agreement	23 April 2013	12th	(Slovakia) Vladimír Ekhardt	23 April 2013

== League table ==
Pos	Team	Pld	W	D	L	GF	GA	GD	Pts	Qualification or relegation
1	Slovan Bratislava (C)	33	16	11	6	56	33	+23	59	Qualification for Champions League second qualifying round
2	Senica	33	16	7	10	40	34	+6	55	Qualification for Europa League second qualifying round
3	Trenčín	33	14	11	8	52	34	+18	53	Qualification for Europa League second qualifying round
4	Spartak Myjava	33	13	9	11	43	37	+6	48	
5	Košice	33	12	11	10	38	33	+5	47	
6	Ružomberok	33	12	9	12	36	46	−10	45	
7	Žilina	33	9	15	9	37	28	+9	42	Qualification for Europa League first qualifying round
8	ViOn Zlaté Moravce	33	11	8	14	42	43	−1	41	
9	Dukla Banská Bystrica	33	9	11	13	28	32	−4	38	
10	Nitra (Note: Nitra was docked three points by the Slovak Football Association (Incident in match between FC Nitra – Spartak Trnava).)	33	11	6	16	39	54	−15	36	
11	Spartak Trnava	33	8	11	14	34	51	−17	35	
12	Tatran Prešov (R)	33	8	9	16	21	41	−20	33	Relegation to 2. liga

Source: Niké liga (in Slovak)
Rules for classification: 1) points; 2) goal difference; 3) number of goals scored.
(C) Champions; (R) Relegated

== Results ==
The schedule consisted of three rounds. The two first rounds consisted of a conventional home and away round-robin schedule. The pairings of the third round were set according to the 2010–11 final standings. Every team played each opponent once for a total of 11 games per team.

Home \ Away	BB	KOŠ	NIT	RUŽ	SEN	SLO	MYJ	TRN	PRE	TRE	ZLM	ŽIL	BB	KOŠ	NIT	RUŽ	SEN	SLO	MYJ	TRN	PRE	TRE	ZLM	ŽIL
Dukla Banská Bystrica		1–2	2–0	0–0	1–2	1–1	1–1	2–0	0–0	2–0	0–0	2–2						1–0			0–0	0–0	1–0	1–2
Košice	1–0		4–0	3–0	2–2	1–0	1–2	1–0	3–0	3–0	2–1	1–1	1–0					1–1				0–0	0–2	2–2
Nitra	1–1	4–1		1–1	0–1	0–3	0–2	1–3	4–1	1–2	1–1	2–0	3–1	1–0		3–0	0–1			3–3				
Ružomberok	1–0	3–1	2–1		0–2	2–2	0–4	2–2	2–0	1–2	3–1	1–0	3–2	1–1			3–1		0–1	1–0			2–1	
Senica	2–3	2–1	2–1	0–3		0–1	0–1	3–0	2–0	1–1	3–0	0–0	1–1	0–0					0–3	3–2		1–0	1–0	
Slovan Bratislava	2–0	3–1	5–2	2–1	1–0		2–1	0–1	2–1	3–1	4–1	1–1			4–0	2–2	3–2		1–1		5–0			1–1
Spartak Myjava	0–1	3–1	0–2	1–0	1–2	1–2		2–2	2–0	2–3	2–2	1–1	2–1	1–0	0–0						2–0	0–2	2–1	
Spartak Trnava	1–0	0–0	2–0	0–1	1–1	0–1	1–1		2–1	0–3	0–5	1–2	0–1	2–3				0–0	1–1			2–0	3–2	
Prešov	1–0	0–0	1–0	2–0	2–0	0–0	2–1	2–1		1–2	1–1	0–0		0–0	0–1	3–1	0–1			0–1				
Trenčín	1–1	0–0	5–0	0–0	1–1	2–2	1–0	6–0	2–1		1–1	0–2			3–0	5–0		4–1			1–1			1–2
ViOn Zlaté Moravce	2–0	1–0	0–2	0–0	0–2	3–1	3–1	1–1	2–0	4–1		1–0			1–2			1–0			0–0	1–2		2–1
Žilina	0–1	0–1	1–1	0–0	2–0	0–0	4–1	1–1	3–0	0–0	4–1				1–2	3–0	0–1		0–0	1–1	0–1			

Source: Niké liga (in Slovak)
Legend: Blue = home team win; Yellow = draw; Red = away team win.

== Top scorers ==
Updated through matches played on 26 May 2013.

Rank	Player	Club	Goals
1	(Argentina) David Depetris	Trenčín	16
2	(Slovakia) Andrej Hodek	Zlaté Moravce	13
2	(Slovakia) Dávid Škutka	Košice	13
2	(Slovakia) Tomáš Ďubek	Ružomberok	13
5	(Slovakia) Róbert Pich	Žilina	11
6	(Brazil) Cléber	Nitra	10
6	(Trinidad and Tobago) Lester Peltier	Slovan Bratislava	10
6	(Slovakia) Peter Sládek	Spartak Myjava	10
6	(Panama) Rolando Blackburn	Senica	10
10	(Slovakia) Filip Hlohovský	Slovan Bratislava	8

== Awards ==
=== Top Eleven ===
- Goalkeeper: (Slovakia) Matúš Putnocký (ŠK Slovan)
- Defence: (Ivory Coast) Mamadou Bagayoko (ŠK Slovan), (Slovakia) Jozef Piaček (MŠK Žilina), (Argentina) Nicolas Ezequiel Gorosito (Šk Slovan), (Slovakia) Tomáš Hučko (Dukla B.Bystrica)
- Midfield: (Slovakia) Igor Žofčák (ŠK Slovan), (Slovakia) Tomáš Kóňa (FK Senica), (Slovakia) Tomáš Ďubek (MŠK Ružomberok), (Serbia) Marko Milinković (ŠK Slovan)
- Attack: (Trinidad and Tobago) Lester Peltier (ŠK Slovan), (Slovakia) Andrej Hodek (FC ViOn)

=== Individual awards ===
Manager of the season Samuel Slovák (ŠK Slovan)

Player of the Year Tomáš Ďubek (MŠK Ružomberok)

Young player of the Year Stanislav Lobotka (AS Trenčín)

== Attendances ==
#	Club	Average
1	Trnava	4,142
2	Trenčín	2,757
3	Košice	2,358
4	Myjava	2,143
5	Senica	2,134
6	Žilina	2,131
7	Slovan	2,022
8	Prešov	1,738
9	Ružomberok	1,647
10	Dukla	1,566
11	ViOn	1,565
12	Nitra	1,054

== See also ==
- 2012–13 Slovak Cup
- 2012–13 2. Liga (Slovakia)

=== Stats ===
- List of foreign players
- List of transfers summer 2012
- List of transfers winter 2012–13
