= Lukacovce =

Lukacovce may refer to several places in Slovakia:

- Lukáčovce - Nitra District
- Lukačovce - Humenne District
