= 2011–12 3. Liga (Slovakia) =

3. Liga
- Season: 2011–12
- Champions: Šaľa (group West); Bardejov (group East)
- Promoted: Šaľa; Bardejov; Šamorín
- Relegated: Púchov (group West); Zvolen, Stará Ľubovňa (group East)

The 2011–12 3. Liga (Slovakia) season of 3. Liga was the 19th edition of third tier football competition in Slovakia, since its establishment in 1993.

33 teams were divided into two geographic groups that contested teams in their own group: 3. liga západ (Group West; 16 teams) and 3. liga východ (Group East; 17 teams).

== 3. liga západ ==
=== Team changes from 2010–11 ===
- Promoted in 1. liga: ↑Myjava↑
- Relegated from 1. liga: ↓Šaľa↓, ↓Púchov↓
- Promoted in 2. liga: ↑Dunajská Lužná↑, ↑Sereď↑
- Relegated from 2. liga: ↓Rača↓, ↓Bernolákovo↓, ↓Jaslovské Bohunice↓

=== Locations ===
Location of teams in 3. liga západ 2011–12

=== League table ===
Pos	Team	Pld	W	D	L	GF	GA	GD	Pts	Promotion or relegation
1	Slovan Duslo Šaľa (C, P)	28	19	2	7	62	25	+37	59	Promotion to 2. liga
2	Šamorín (O, P)	28	15	7	6	48	21	+27	52	Qualification for Promotion play-off
3	Nové Mesto nad Váhom	28	15	6	7	45	36	+9	51	
4	Sereď	28	14	6	8	45	28	+17	48	
5	Spartak Vráble	28	11	8	9	43	35	+8	41	
6	Slovan Bratislava juniori	28	12	5	11	49	45	+4	41	
7	Spartak Trnava B	28	12	3	13	60	55	+5	39	
8	Dunajská Lužná	28	11	6	11	29	39	−10	39	
9	Vrbové	28	10	6	12	27	40	−13	36	
10	Nitra juniori	28	9	7	12	39	43	−4	34	
11	Nové Zámky	28	9	7	12	34	34	0	34	
12	Pezinok	28	9	7	12	23	34	−11	34	
13	Moravany nad Váhom	28	8	6	14	32	52	−20	30	
14	Slovan Nemšová	28	7	8	13	38	52	−14	29	
15	Topvar Topoľčany	28	4	6	18	29	63	−34	18	
16	Púchov (R)	0	0	0	0	0	0	0	0 (Note: FK Púchov Púchov resigned from 3. liga - Západ,due to lack of funds to run the club.)	Relegation to Majstrovstvá Regiónu

Source: soccerway.com
Rules for classification: 1) points; 2) goal difference; 3) number of goals scored.
(C) Champions; (O) Play-off winners; (P) Promoted; (R) Relegated

== 3. liga východ ==
=== Team changes from 2010–11 ===
- Promoted in 1. liga: ↑Podbrezová↑
- Relegated from 1. liga: -
- Promoted in 2. liga: ↑Kremnička↑, ↑Námestovo↑, ↑Loky Košice↑, ↑FK Bodva B↑
- Relegated from 2. liga: ↓Žilina B×↓, ↓Humenné↓

×-withdrew from league

=== Locations ===
Location of teams in 3. liga východ 2011–12

=== League table ===
Pos	Team	Pld	W	D	L	GF	GA	GD	Pts	Promotion or relegation
1	Partizán Bardejov (C, P)	32	22	7	3	60	27	+33	73	Promotion to 2. liga
2	Baník Ružiná	32	21	5	6	87	34	+53	68	Qualification for Promotion play-off
3	Lokomotíva Košice	32	21	5	6	70	23	+47	68	
4	Tatran Prešov juniori	32	15	8	9	60	43	+17	53	
5	Sokol Dolná Ždaňa	32	16	4	12	50	40	+10	52	
6	Spišská Nová Ves	32	13	10	9	47	33	+14	49	
7	Dukla Banská Bystrica juniori	32	14	7	11	57	42	+15	49	
8	Vranov nad Topľou	32	14	5	13	42	47	−5	47	
9	Poprad	32	11	11	10	41	35	+6	44	
10	Odeva Lipany	32	13	4	15	52	49	+3	43	
11	Košice B	32	12	6	14	53	55	−2	42	
12	Bodva Moldava nad Bodvou B	32	13	1	18	46	65	−19	40	
13	Námestovo	32	11	5	16	35	51	−16	38	
14	Kremnička	32	11	3	18	41	52	−11	36	
15	Slavoj Trebišov	32	11	1	20	41	61	−20	34	
16	Lokomotíva Zvolen (R)	32	8	8	16	36	60	−24	32	Relegation to Majstrovstvá Regiónu
17	Goral Stará Ľubovňa (R)	32	0	2	30	12	113	−101	2	Relegation to Majstrovstvá Regiónu

Source: soccerway.com
Rules for classification: 1) points; 2) goal difference; 3) number of goals scored.
(C) Champions; (P) Promoted; (R) Relegated

== Promotion play-offs ==
26 June 2012
18:00 CEST

FC ŠTK 1914 Šamorín	2–1	TJ Baník Ružiná
Ležaić 22'; Pelegríni 72'	Report	Boháčik 67'

FC ViOn Stadium, Zlaté Moravce
Attendance: 650
Referee: Ivan Kružliak
