= Augustín Paulík =

Slovak footballer

Personal information
- Full name: Augustín Paulík
- Date of birth: 17 July 1982 (age 44)
- Place of birth: Czechoslovakia
- Height: 1.82 m (5 ft 11 1/2 in)
- Position: Midfielder

Team information
- Current team: OŠK Chynorany

Youth career
- –2000: FK Tempo Partizánske
- 2000–2001: Inter Bratislava

Senior career*
Years	Team	Apps	(Gls)
2001–2006	Inter Bratislava	130	(6)
2001–2002	→ Topoľčany (loan)		
2007	Koper	9	(0)
2007–2009	Žiar nad Hronom		
2009	→ Ružiná (loan)		
2009	Ružiná		
2010	Bánovce nad Bebravou		
2011–	OŠK Chynorany		
2012–	→ FK Veľké Bielice (loan)		
- * Club domestic league appearances and goals as of 20 August 2012

Augustín Paulík (born 17 July 1982) is a Slovak football midfielder who played for FK Inter Bratislava and currently plays for OŠK Chynorany.

He played with FC Koper in the Slovenian First League.
