= Ivan Trabalík =

Slovak footballer

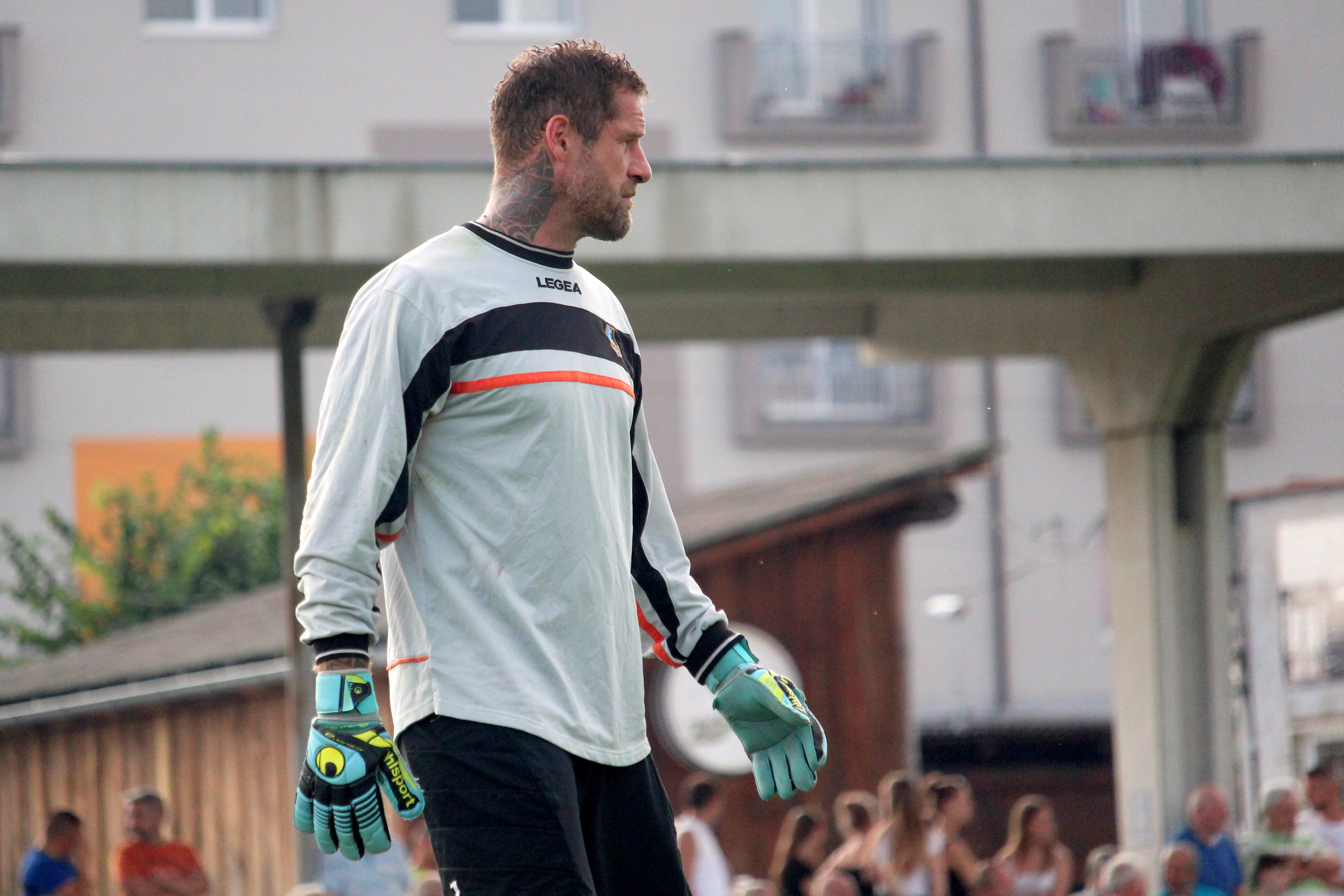

Personal information
- Full name: Ivan Trabalík
- Date of birth: 8 October 1974 (age 52)
- Place of birth: Nitra, Czechoslovakia
- Height: 2.01 m (6 ft 7 in)
- Position: Goalkeeper

Youth career
- Dolný Kubín
- Nitra

Senior career*
Years	Team	Apps	(Gls)
1996–2002	Ružomberok		
2001–2002	Wisła Kraków	9	(0)
2003–2004	Žilina	48	(0)
2004–2005	Inter Bratislava	9	(0)
2005–2007	Teraktor Sazi		
2007–2008	Aris Limassol	17	(0)
2008–2015	Dolný Kubín		
2015–2017	Tatran Oravské Veselé		
2017–2020	Dolný Kubín		

International career
2004	Slovakia	1	(0)
- * Club domestic league appearances and goals

Ivan Trabalík (born 8 October 1974) is a Slovak former professional footballer who played as a goalkeeper. Trabalík is a well traveled player who has played in his home country of Slovakia, as well as overseas in Poland and Iran and latest in Cyprus.

== Honours ==
Wisła Kraków

- Polish Cup: 2001–02

Žilina

- Slovak First Football League: 2002–03, 2003–04
- Slovak Super Cup: 2003
