= Kálmán Tihanyi =

Hungarian physicist, electrical engineer and inventor

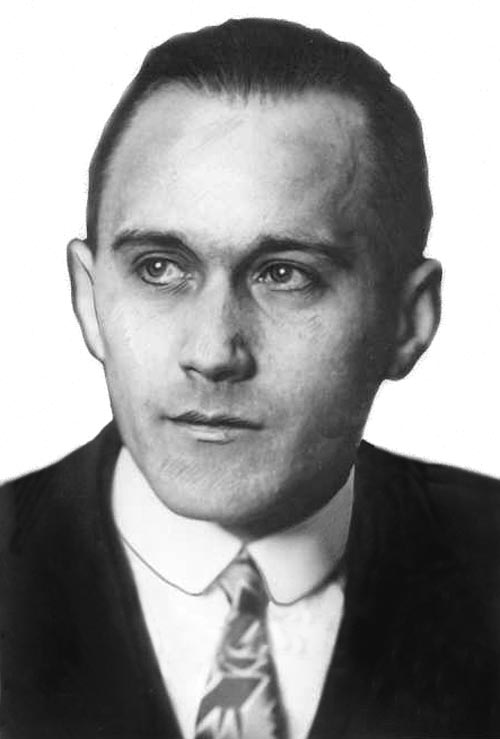
- Kálmán Tihanyi
- Born: 28 April 1897; Üzbég, Kingdom of Hungary
- Died: 26 February 1947 (aged 49); Budapest, Second Hungarian Republic
- Education: University of Pozsony, BME University Budapest
- Known for: Electronic Television, Plasma Display, Infrared camera, Optically controlled automatic pilotless aircraft
- Scientific career
- Fields: inventor, engineer, physicist

Kálmán Tihanyi (Hungarian: [ˈkaːlmaːn ˈtihɒɲi]), or in English language technical literature often mentioned as Coloman Tihanyi or Koloman Tihanyi (28 April 1897 – 26 February 1947) was a Hungarian physicist, electrical engineer and inventor. One of the early pioneers of electronic television, he made significant contributions to the development of cathode ray tubes (CRTs), which were bought and further developed by the Radio Corporation of America (later RCA), and German companies Loewe and Fernseh AG. He invented and designed the world's first automatic pilotless aircraft in Great Britain. He is also known for the invention of the first infrared video camera in 1929, and coined the first flat panel plasma display in 1936. His Radioskop patent was recognized as a Document of Universal Significance by the UNESCO, and thus became part of the Memory of the World Programme on September 4, 2001.

== Career ==
=== Early life, WW1 and education ===
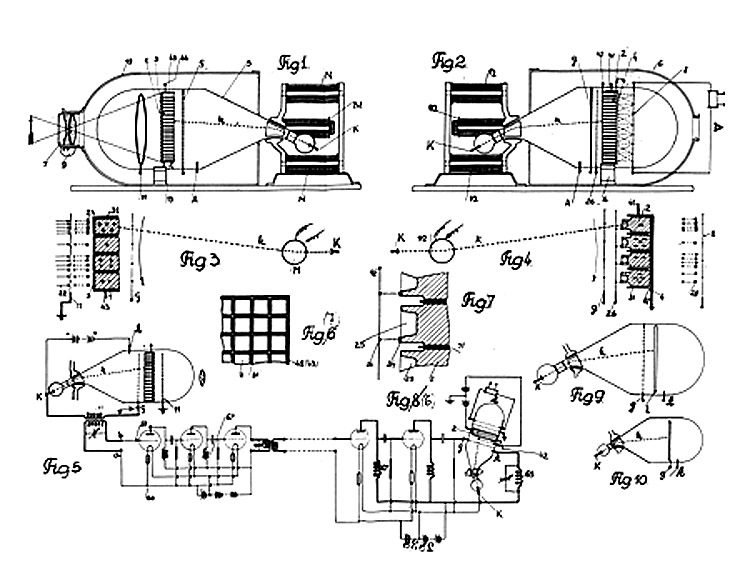
Graphic from Kálmán Tihanyi's "Radioskop" patent (1926)

From European Patent Office abstract of Tihanyi's 1928 application Improvements in television apparatus

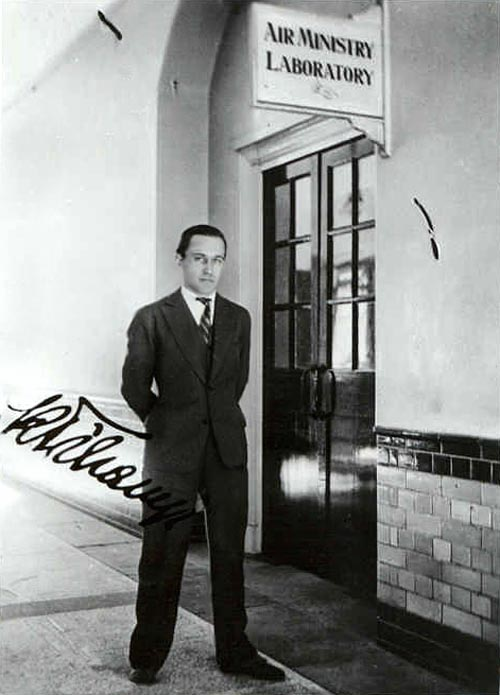
Kalman Tihanyi as a scientist of British Air Ministry

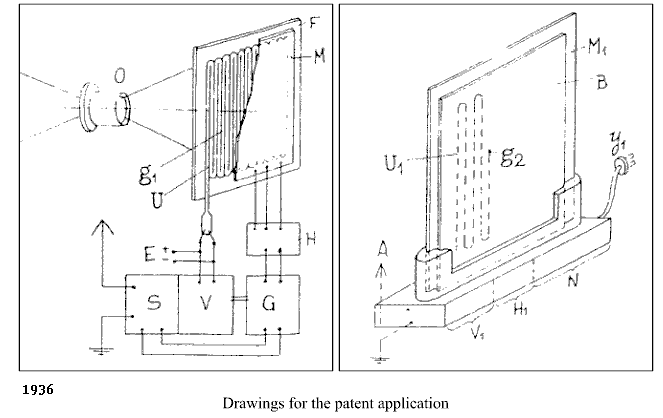
Graphic from Tihanyi's plasma display patent (1936)

Born in Üzbég, Kingdom of Hungary (now Zbehy, Slovakia), Tihanyi's parents enrolled him in the Vocational School of Electrical Engineering in Pozsony (now Bratislava). While a student there he filed his first patent application with the Hungarian Patent Office in 1913, at the age of sixteen. The first contract of his life was signed with a Viennese company, which purchased his equipment for the central, wireless switching on and off of road lights.

After graduating from high school, he entered the Hungarian Royal Army as a volunteer in 1916. Eventually, he was transferred to a non-combat unit where he was able to gain experience as a radio engineer which he would utilize later in his life.

=== Interwar period ===
After World War I, Kálmán Tihanyi returned to civil life, continuing his studies at the Royal Hungarian Joseph University of Technology in Budapest.

Tihany's attention was already drawn to the attempts to create television during World War I. The problem of low sensitivity to light resulting in low electrical output from transmitting or "camera" tubes would be solved with the introduction of charge-storage technology by Tihanyi in the beginning of 1924. His final design was patented under the name "Radioskop" (Hungarian patent: T-3768) on 20 March 1926. He described his cathode ray tube, charge-storage television system in not one, but in three versions - wired, wireless, and color, which meant he was thinking of color television even when black and white films were made in the vast majority of the film industry. His patent application contained 42 pages detailing its design and mass production. It is recorded in UNESCO's Memory of the World International Register.

Though it bears certain similarities to earlier proposals employing a cathode ray tube (CRT) for both transmitter and receiver, Tihanyi's system represented a radical departure. Like the final, improved version Tihanyi would patent in 1928, it embodied an entirely new concept in design and operation, building upon a technology that would become known as the "storage principle".

However, the radically new concepts what he represented in his Radioskop patent were not widely understood and recognised by the contemporary professionals until around 1930.

==== Berlin ====
In 1928, Tihanyi went to Berlin, where the development of mechanical television involving Nipkow disks had already been begun by the German Post Office and the larger manufacturers. He set up his own laboratory in Berlin, where he made his first experimental picture tube with his younger brother, who also was an electrical engineer. The invention was received with enthusiasm by Telefunken and Siemens, but in the end, they opted to continue with the development of mechanical television.

The American Radio Corporation of America (RCA) approached him and sought to purchase his patent. Laboratory development of the image resolution tube began, and after a few months, the first well-functioning American camera tubes based on Tihanyi's ideas were completed by Vladimir Zworykin at RCA. The new television system was named the iconoscope.

==== London ====
In 1929, Tihanyi patented his new military invention under the title: "Automatic sighting and directing devices for torpedoes, guns and other apparatus" (See: British patent GB352035A). That same year, he moved to London, where he was invited to work on television guidance for defense applications, building prototypes of a camera for remotely guided aircraft for the British Air Ministry, and later adapting it for the Italian Navy.

The solutions of the technology what Tihanyi depicted in his 1929 patent were so influential, that American UAV producing companies still used many of its ideas even half century later, until the mid 1980s. In 1929, he invented the World's first infrared-sensitive (night vision) electronic television camera for anti-aircraft defense in Britain. In London he was commissioned with the designing of the remote-control devices and fire control systems for tanks, anti-aircraft guns and anti-aircraft reflectors for Britain.

Tihanyi's U.S. patents for his display and camera tubes, assigned to RCA, were issued in 1938 and 1939, respectively.

==== Budapest ====
In 1936 Tihanyi described the principle of "plasma television" and conceived the first flat-panel television system.

=== World War Two ===
==== "Titan" Ultrasound weapon ====
In the summer of 1940, he returned home with an elaborate plan for the acoustic beam projector. The experiments with Titan Ultrasound Weapon, codenamed TVR, were surrounded by the greatest secret. To achieve this, it soon reached an agreement with the approval of the Supreme Military Technical Council. It was completed by the end of 1941 by organizing the work, making construction drawings, setting up a plant and two laboratories. The large workpieces were made in the Ganz and Láng factories; everything else, including a 2-meter-diameter parabolic mirror, was manufactured by themselves. He selected 45 Jewish origin employees of the Hungarian Royal Special Military Corps, including nine engineers, from the ranks of military labourers. In this way, Tihanyi could help his Jewish origin friends and colleagues to avoid deportation.

After the German occupation of Hungary, Tihanyi emerged in a desperate situation. On 5 April 1944, he and his main collaborators were arrested by the Gestapo. On April 11, 1944, he was taken from Hadik Barracks to Margit Boulevard Military Prison, where he was held in probation for five months, in solitary confinement, he was accused of high treason as an alleged British Agent and member of MI6.

=== Post War period and death ===
At the end of the war, despite his physically deteriorated condition, he was working 16–17 hours a day. In his factory, he started to manufacture ball bearings that were hollow. In June of 1945, he took steps to found a Hungarian television company, build a transmitter station and organise a picture tube factory. However, these plans were postponed and he decided to work on a gold centrifuge, chosen from dozens of ideas based on ultrasound technology. To realise this idea, he teamed up with professor Lajos Lóczy, the director of the Institute of Geology, to build a prototype.

In the winter of 1946, Tihanyi suffered a heart attack, perhaps indicating that his body could not cope with the accelerated pace. He suffered a second, fatal, heart attack shortly after, on 26 February 1947.

== See also ==
- Memory of the World Programme, UNESCO
- History of television
- History of unmanned aerial vehicles
- Thermographic camera
- Plasma display
