= Samuel Slovák =

Slovak former footballer (born 1975)

Personal information
- Full name: Samuel Slovák
- Date of birth: 17 October 1975 (age 51)
- Place of birth: Nitra, Czechoslovakia
- Height: 1.78 m (5 ft 10 in)
- Position: Attacking midfielder

Youth career
- Nitra
- 1989–1994: Slovan Bratislava

Senior career*
Years	Team	Apps	(Gls)
1994–1997	Slovan Bratislava	62	(7)
1997–2002	Tenerife	70	(5)
2000–2001	→ Slovan Bratislava (loan)	18	(5)
2002–2003	Slovan Liberec	6	(3)
2004–2005	1. FC Nürnberg	31	(4)
2005–2010	Slovan Bratislava	89	(20)
Total		276	(44)

International career
1996–2007	Slovakia	20	(0)

Managerial career
- 2011–2012: Slovan Bratislava B
- 2012–2013: Slovan Bratislava
- 2014: Slovan Liberec
- 2020–2022: Slovakia (assistant)
- 2022: Slovakia
- * Club domestic league appearances and goals

Samuel Slovák (born 17 October 1975) is a Slovak former footballer who played as an attacking midfielder and currently serves as an assistant coach of Slovakia.

Best known for his technical and passing abilities, his career was mostly associated with Slovan Bratislava, which he also captained for several years.

== Club career ==
Slovák was born in Nitra. After a brief spell at local FC Nitra, the 19-year-old signed with ŠK Slovan Bratislava, where he appeared regularly from an early age.

In the summer of 1997, Slovák moved abroad, joining Spain's CD Tenerife. During his spell, he was sparingly used while the club was in La Liga (with a maximum input of 27 matches in 1999–2000's Segunda División, without promotion), also being loaned to former side Slovan for one year.

Slovák moved in 2002 to neighbouring Czech Republic, signing for Gambrinus liga title holders FC Slovan Liberec. After six games and three goals, his season was finished after he suffered a serious knee injury.

In the January 2004 transfer window, when fully recovered, Slovák changed countries again, signing for 1. FC Nürnberg, where he teamed up with compatriots Marek Mintál and Róbert Vittek, being the least successful player of the trio. In mid-October of the following year, the 30-year-old left the Germans and returned to Slovan Bratislava. In the 2006–07 campaign, he helped the team to a third-place finish, scoring twice from 27 appearances.

After appearing in less than half of the matches in 2009–10, with Slovan finishing in second position in the Slovak Super Liga, Slovák retired from football due to recurring knee problems, aged nearly 35. He returned to his main club in 2011, being appointed manager of the reserves.

In the 2012–13 season, Slovák led Slovan to the double. He left the Štadión Pasienky, however, being appointed at Liberec.

== International career ==
Slovák won his first cap for Slovakia at the age of 20, going on to appear in a further 19 games in the following decade, although he went through a large period of international inactivity, playing no matches from 2002 to 2004.

== Honours ==
=== Player ===
Slovan Bratislava

- Slovak Super Liga: 1994–95, 1995–96, 2008–09
- Slovak Cup: 1996–97, 2009–10

=== Manager ===
Slovan Bratislava

- Slovak Super Liga: 2012–13
- Slovak Cup: 2012–13
