= OŠK Moravany nad Váhom =

Slovak football club

- Full name: OŠK Moravany nad Váhom
- Founded: 1929
- Ground: Štadión v Moravanoch, Moravany nad Váhom
- Capacity: 1,018
- Chairman: Tomáš Šimek
- Manager: Andrej Filip
- League: Givova III. Trieda "B"
- 2011–12: 3. liga, 13th (Západ)
- Website: http://www.otjmoravany.estranky.sk
Home colours

OTJ Moravany nad Váhom was a Slovak football team, based in the town of Moravany nad Váhom. The club was founded in 1929. This club had students, adolescents and men. Today is name of club OŠK Moravany nad Váhom.

== Stadium ==
The team host its matches at Štadión v Moravanoch, nicknamed "Zelenák". - Number of seats: 1018 (348 of which covered) - Western grandstand capacity: 588 (of which 300 covered) - Capacity V.I.P. stands: 48 (indoor) - Sector reviews: 144 (uncovered) - Number of toilets for spectators: 2 (1 + 1 × male × female) - The number of refreshment stalls: 1 - Number of cash: 2 - Court dimensions: 105 x 66 m - Total area: 111 x 70 m - Fence board: yes - Large nets behind the goals: yes - Scoreboard: 1 piece
