= Ladislav Pecko =

Slovak footballer and manager

Personal information
- Date of birth: 27 June 1968 (age 58)
- Place of birth: Krásno nad Kysucou, Czechoslovakia
- Position: Defender

Youth career
- Dolný Kubín

Senior career*
Years	Team	Apps	(Gls)
1988–2005	Slovan Bratislava	431	(30)
1994	Petra Drnovice	3	(0)

International career
1987–1990	Czechoslovakia U21	13	(0)
1990–1992	Czechoslovakia	11	(1)
1995–2001	Slovakia	6	(0)

Managerial career
- 2008–2009: Slovan Bratislava
- 2010–2011: Tatran Prešov
- 2011–2013: Slovakia U16; Slovakia U17
- 2015: Slovan Bratislava (Assistant)
- 2015–2016: MFK Ružomberok
- 2019: MFK Ružomberok B
- 2020–2021: FC Petržalka
- 2022–2023: MFK Dolný Kubín
- * Club domestic league appearances and goals

Ladislav Pecko (born 27 June 1968) is a former Slovak football player and manager who was last head coach of MFK Dolný Kubín. Internationally he played 11 matches for Czechoslovakia, scoring once, as well as 6 matches for Slovakia. He spent most of his career in ŠK Slovan Bratislava. His playing position was right-wing back.

== Club career ==
Pecko played in the Czechoslovak First League for Slovan Bratislava from 1988. During his time at the club he won the league in the 1991–92 season. He also won the Slovak Cup and was a finalist of the Czechoslovak Cup in the 1988–89 season. He made three league appearances for FK Drnovice in the Czech First League.

== International career ==
Pecko played for Czechoslovakia U21 from 1987 to 1990, making 13 appearances without scoring. He then played for Czechoslovakia, scoring once in 11 appearances for the senior team between 1990 and 1992. Following the dissolution of Czechoslovakia, Pecko made six appearances for Slovakia.

== Coaching career ==
Pecko was head coach of the title-winning Slovan Bratislava side in the 2008–09 season, during which the team also won the 2009 Slovak Super Cup. He joined Tatran Prešov as head coach in August 2010, on a deal until the end of the 2010–11 season. While head coach of MFK Ružomberok, Pecko received a three-week suspension from the Slovak Football Association for unsportsmanlike behaviour in November 2015.

Following a period as head coach of MFK Dolný Kubín, Pecko left football coaching and began work in a Bratislava restaurant kitchen.
