= Ivan Chodák =

Slovak footballer (1914–1994)

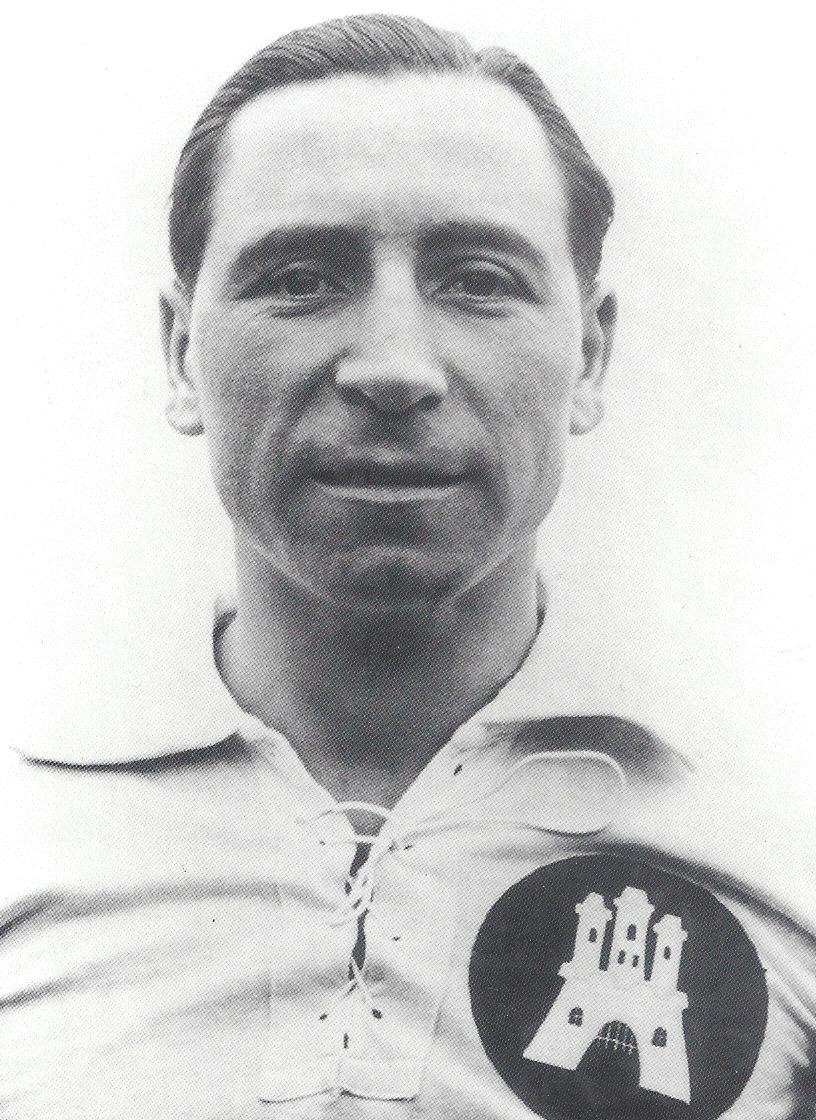

Personal information
- Date of birth: 3 February 1914
- Place of birth: Dolný Kubín
- Date of death: 14 February 1994 (aged 80)
- Place of death: Bratislava

Ivan Chodák (3 February 1914 – 14 February 1994) was a Slovak footballer, coach, and doctor of medicine.

He studied at the Faculty of Medicine, Comenius University in Bratislava, earning his doctorate in 1938. In Bratislava, he became a well-known doctor specializing in otorhinolaryngology.

He began his football in 1935, where he temporarily played for FC Vrútky and played for VS Bratislava in the autumn. Chodák played his first league match in club colors of 1. ČsSK Bratislava on 1 December 1935 against Teplitzer FK. He took part in 193 league matches and scored 23 goals. Apart from being a goalkeeper, he played in every position. He also represented Slovakia eleven times. He retired from playing active football career in 1946. Due to his fair-play attitude, he was nicknamed the "Knight in Football Boots".

Apart from football he also participated in athletics, including running distances between 800m and 5000m, as well as high jumping.

In 1934, he achieved the academic champion title of Czechoslovakia in cross-country skiing, which allowed him to participate in the Academic World Winter Games in St. Moritz, Switzerland.

As a student, he played ice hockey for VS Bratislava and SK Bratislava. He was a two-time finalist and champion of Slovakia. He was in the selected players team three times. He served as the first sparring partner in figure skating for Hilda Múdra, renowned for training Olympic gold medalist Ondrej Nepela. For over 25 years, he coached all Slovak teams, from the A-team to junior teams, including unregistered players.

On 14 February 1994, he died from natural causes at the age of 80.

In that same year the Slovak Football Association announced the creation of 'The Dr. Ivan Chodak Fair Play Prize', given every year, at an award ceremony held at the football stadium named after him in Dolný Kubín.
