= Mestský štadión (Lučenec) =

Football stadium in Lučenec, Slovakia

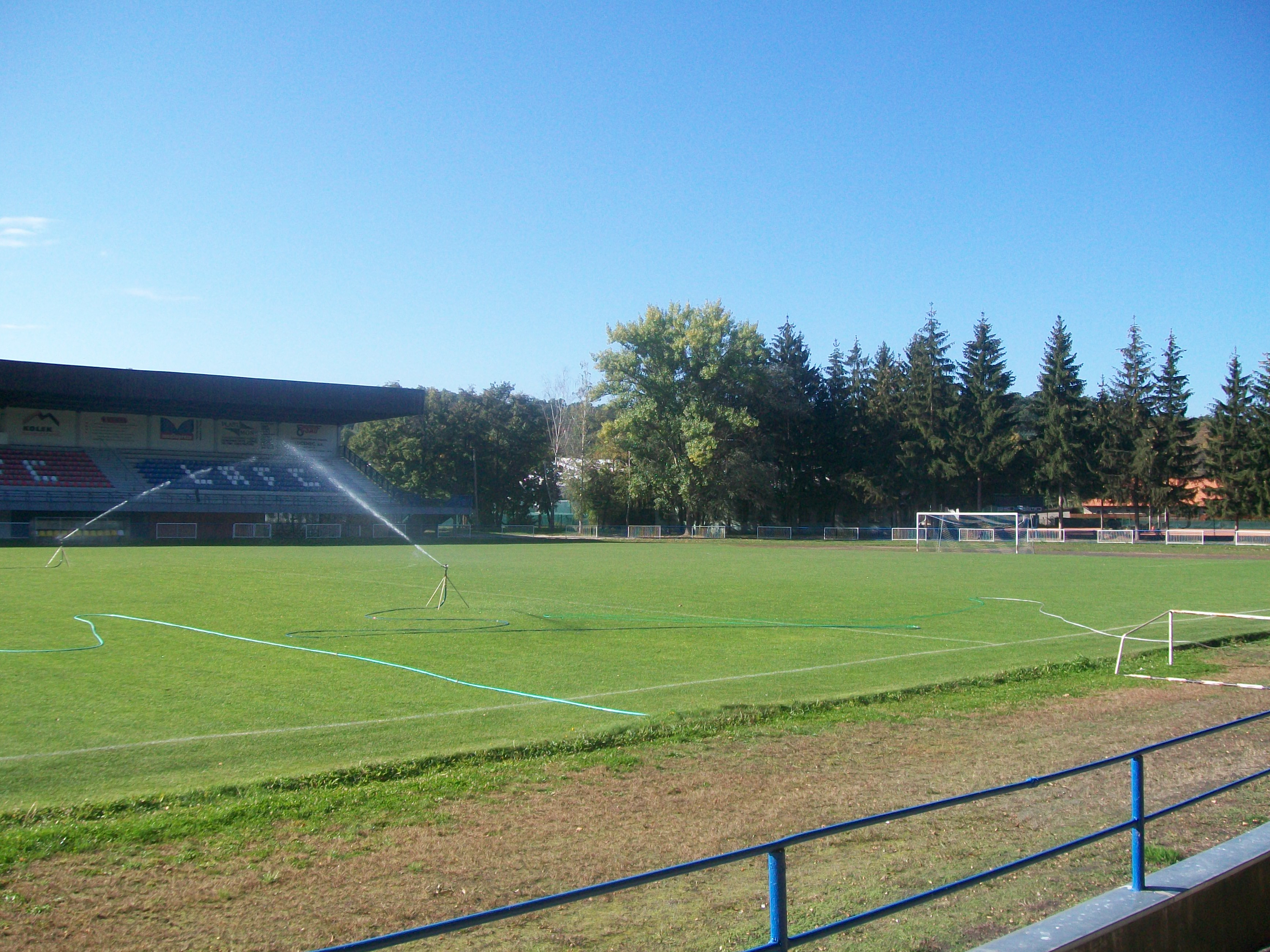
- Interactive map of Mestský štadión
- Location: Lučenec, Slovakia
- Coordinates: 48°19′43.18″N 19°38′31.07″E
- Owner: City of Lučenec
- Capacity: 5,000
- Surface: Grass

Tenant
- MŠK Novohrad Lučenec

The Mestský štadión is a multi-purpose stadium in Lučenec, Slovakia, currently used mostly for football matches. It is the home ground of MŠK Novohrad Lučenec and holds a capacity of 5,000 people.

The stadium was damaged during the 2010 Central European floods.
