= Zbehy =

Zbehy Üzbég
- Municipality
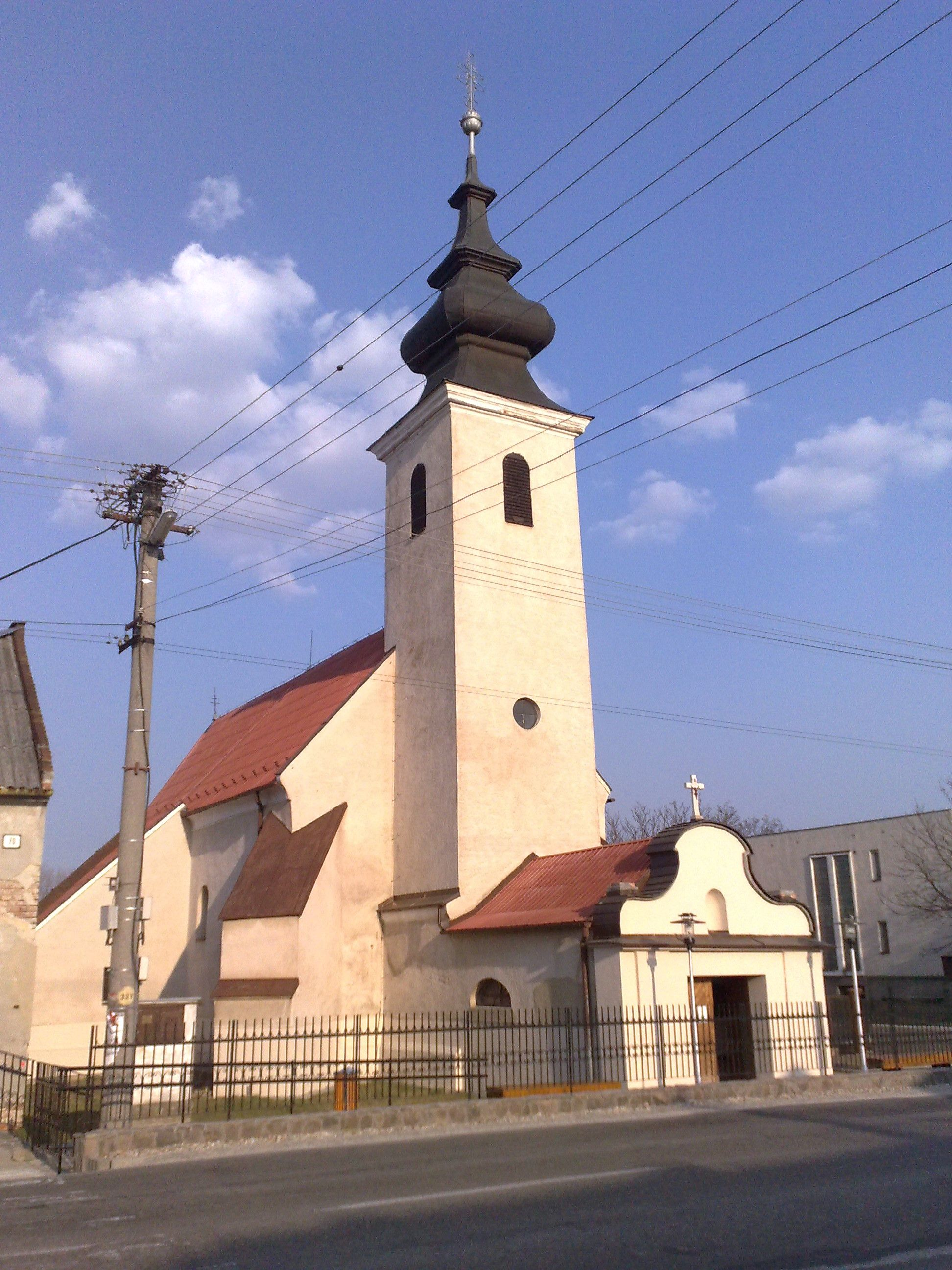
- Church of the Elevation of the Holy Cross

- Flag

- Location of Zbehy in the Nitra Region Location of Zbehy in Slovakia
- Coordinates: 48.36°N 18.02°E
- Country: Slovakia
- Region: Nitra Region
- District: Nitra District
- First mentioned: 1156

Area
  - Total: 19.55 km^{2} (7.55 sq mi)
- Elevation: 154 m (505 ft)

Population (2025)
  - Total: 2,269
- Time zone: UTC+1 (CET)
  - Summer (DST): UTC+2 (CEST)
- Postal code: 951 42
- Area code: +421 37
- Vehicle registration plate (until 2022): NR
- Website: www.zbehy.sk

Zbehy (Hungarian: Üzbég) is a village and municipality in the Nitra District in Slovakia. Local areas like Andač and Holotka belong to the village Zbehy.

== History ==
The village was first mentioned in a historical record in the year 1156 as Jegu. Until the 16th century it was the property of the Archdiocese of Esztergom. In the centuries afterward more Noble families and aristocratics gained property. In the year 1598 the Ottoman Empire invaded the village and burned it.

== Notable people ==
Kálmán Tihanyi was born in the village (28 April 1897, and died 26 February 1947, Budapest). He was a Hungarian physicist, electrical engineer and inventor. One of the early pioneers of electronic television.

== Geography ==
The municipality lies at an altitude of 154 metres (505 ft) and covers an area of 19.55 km^{2} (7.55 sq mi) (2025).

== Population ==
Population statistic (10 years)
Year	1995	2005	2015	2025
Count	2060	2184	2256	2269
Difference		+6.01%	+3.29%	+0.57%

Population statistic
Year	2024	2025
Count	2276	2269
Difference		−0.30%

It has a population of 2269 people (31 December 2025).

=== Ethnicity ===
Census 2021 (1+ %)
Ethnicity	Number	Fraction
Slovak	2035	91.58%
Not found out	170	7.65%
Total	2222	

In year 2021 was 2222 people by ethnicity 2035 as Slovak, 170 as Not found out, 13 as Hungarian, 11 as Czech, 11 as Other, 9 as Romani, 3 as Moravian, 3 as Albanian, 2 as Ukrainian, 2 as Polish, 2 as Croatian, 1 as Serbian, 1 as Rusyn, 1 as Romanian and 1 as Austrian.

Note on population: The difference values of population numbers in the table "Population statistic" and in the sections "Ethnicity" & "Religion" is caused by the use of various statistical methods.

=== Religion ===
Census 2021 (1+ %)
Religion	Number	Fraction
Roman Catholic Church	1559	70.16%
None	399	17.96%
Not found out	170	7.65%
Evangelical Church	31	1.4%
Total	2222	

In year 2021 was 2222 people by religion 1559 from Roman Catholic Church, 399 from None, 170 from Not found out, 31 from Evangelical Church, 18 from Greek Catholic Church, 10 from Ad hoc movements, 9 from Christian Congregations in Slovakia, 6 from Islam, 5 from Calvinist Church, 5 from Other, 3 from Eastern Orthodox Church, 2 from Other and not ascertained christian church, 2 from Jehovah's Witnesses, 1 from Paganism and natural spirituality, 1 from Buddhism and 1 from Baptists Church.

== Facilities ==
The village has a public library a gym and football pitch.
