= Lukačovce =

- Municipality
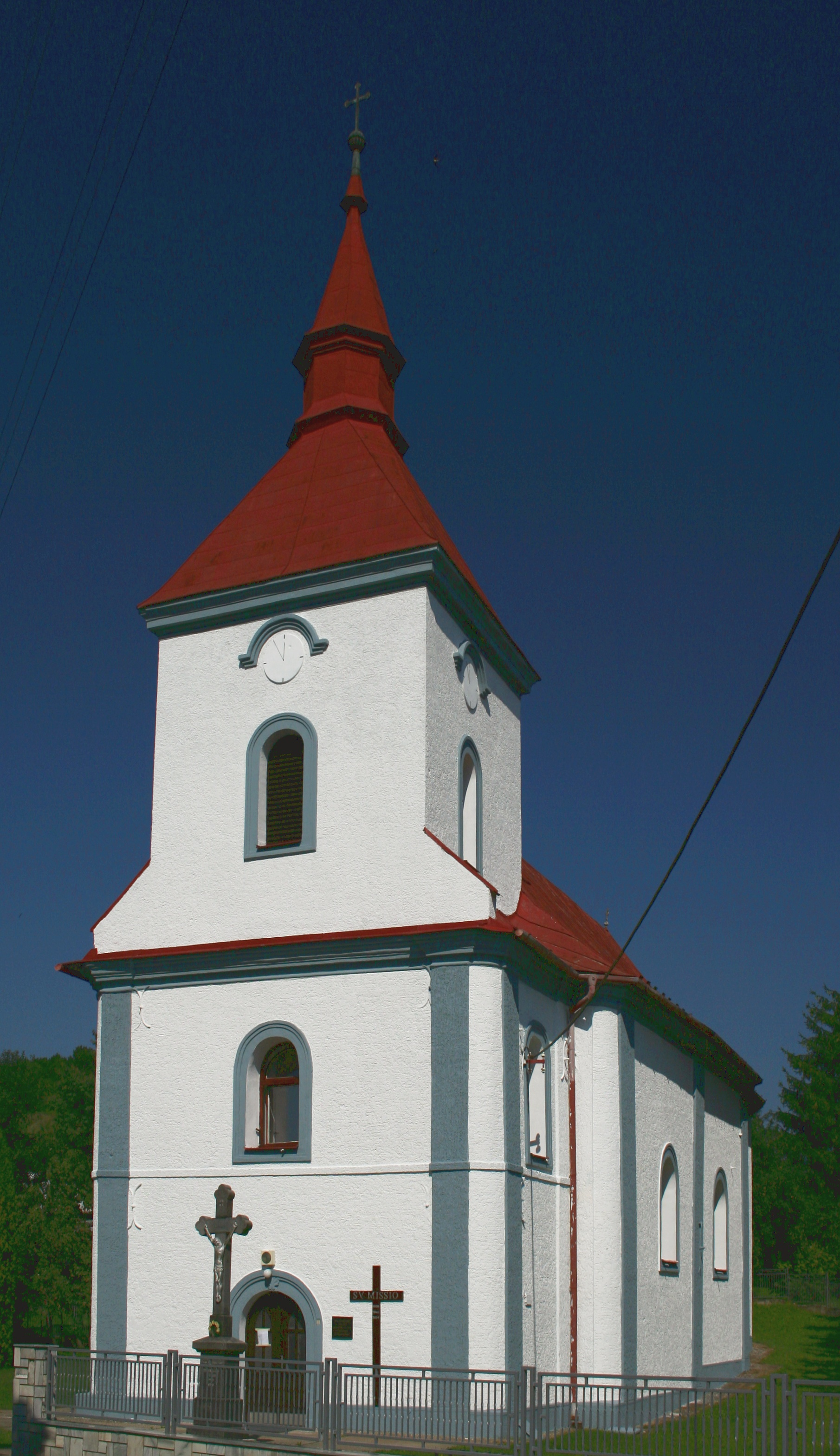

- Flag

- Location of Lukačovce in the Prešov Region Location of Lukačovce in Slovakia
- Coordinates: 49.03°N 21.78°E
- Country: Slovakia
- Region: Prešov Region
- District: Humenné District
- First mentioned: 1543

Area
  - Total: 7.43 km^{2} (2.87 sq mi)
- Elevation: 167 m (548 ft)

Population (2025)
  - Total: 434
- Time zone: UTC+1 (CET)
  - Summer (DST): UTC+2 (CEST)
- Postal code: 672 4
- Area code: +421 57
- Vehicle registration plate (until 2022): HE
- Website: obeclukacovce.eu

Lukačovce is a village and municipality in Humenné District in the Prešov Region of north-east Slovakia.

== History ==
In historical records the village was first mentioned in 1543.

== Geography ==
The municipality lies at an altitude of 167 metres (548 ft) and covers an area of 7.43 km^{2} (2.87 sq mi) (2025).

== Population ==
Population statistic (10 years)
Year	1995	2005	2015	2025
Count	518	499	463	434
Difference		−3.66%	−7.21%	−6.26%

Population statistic
Year	2024	2025
Count	443	434
Difference		−2.03%

It has a population of 434 people (31 December 2025).

=== Ethnicity ===
Census 2021 (1+ %)
Ethnicity	Number	Fraction
Slovak	440	94.62%
Not found out	18	3.87%
Ukrainian	6	1.29%
Rusyn	6	1.29%
Total	465	

In year 2021 was 465 people by ethnicity 440 as Slovak, 18 as Not found out, 6 as Ukrainian, 6 as Rusyn and 1 as Polish.

Note on population: The difference values of population numbers in the table "Population statistic" and in the sections "Ethnicity" & "Religion" is caused by the use of various statistical methods.

=== Religion ===
Census 2021 (1+ %)
Religion	Number	Fraction
Roman Catholic Church	409	87.96%
Greek Catholic Church	22	4.73%
Not found out	18	3.87%
None	13	2.8%
Total	465	

In year 2021 was 465 people by religion 409 from Roman Catholic Church, 22 from Greek Catholic Church, 18 from Not found out, 13 from None, 1 from Eastern Orthodox Church, 1 from Jehovah's Witnesses and 1 from Ad hoc movements.
