= Jozef Vukušič =

Slovak football manager (born 1964)

Personal information
- Date of birth: 31 August 1964 (age 62)
- Place of birth: Košice, Czechoslovakia
- Position: Midfielder

Youth career
- 1975–1983: VSŽ Košice

Senior career*
| Years | Team | Apps | (Gls) |
| 1983–1992 | VSŽ Košice | | |
- FK Šarišské Michaľany
| 1992–1996 | Košice | | |
- VFL Rheinbach

Managerial career
- 1994–1995: Košice (playing assistant coach)
- 1996–1999: VFL Rheinbach
- 2000–2003: Steel Trans Ličartovce
- 2003–2004: Ružomberok
- 2004: Spartak Trnava
- 2005–2009: Slovakia U21 (assistant)
- 2010–2012: Cape Town
- 2012–2013: Nitra
- 2013–2014: Ružomberok
- 2014: Al-Ahly
- 2015: VSS Košice
- 2016: Shakhter Karagandy
- 2017: Spartaks Jūrmala
- 2018–2019: Polokwane City
- 2019–2020: AmaZulu
- 2021–2022: FC Košice
- 2024-: Vista Gelendzhik
- * Club domestic league appearances and goals

Jozef Vukušič (born 31 August 1964) is a Slovak football manager and former player who most recently managed FC Košice.

== Managerial career ==
Previously Vukušič managed FC Nitra, FC Cape Town and Polokwane City from South Africa.

On 8 January 2016, Vukušič was appointed as manager of Kazakhstan Premier League side Shakhter Karagandy, resigning from the position on 3 August 2016.
