= Ladislav Šimčo =

Slovak footballer and manager

Personal information
- Date of birth: 29 May 1967 (age 59)
- Place of birth: Košice, Czechoslovakia
- Position: Forward

Youth career
- Lokomotíva Košice

Senior career*
| Years | Team | Apps | (Gls) |
- Lokomotíva Košice
- Inter Bratislava
- Lokomotíva Košice
| 1996–1998 | Hradec Králové | 43 | (4) |

Managerial career
- Lokomotíva Košice (youth team)
- FK Šaca
- Lokomotíva Košice
- MFK Košice B
- 2011–2012: MFK Košice
- 2012–2013: MFK Ružomberok
- 2013: FC Nitra
- 2013–2014: Lokomotíva Košice
- 2014: MFK Ružomberok
- 2015–: VSS Košice (youth team)
- * Club domestic league appearances and goals

Ladislav Šimčo (born 29 May 1967) is a Slovak former football manager and former player. He previously managed team of Lokomotíva Košice. He was the manager of MFK Ružomberok in the 2012–13 season and in the 2011–12 season he was MFK Košice head coach. He has son Dominik, also former Lokomotíva Košice player.

== Career ==
Šimčo made 43 appearances in the Czech Gambrinus liga for FC Hradec Králové.
