= Futbal Aréna Zvolen =

Football stadium in Ružiná, Slovakia

- Interactive map of Futbal Aréna Zvolen
- Location: Stadium, Slovakia
- Coordinates: 48°25.8702′N 19°33.3312′E
- Operator: MFK Zvolen
- Capacity: 1,870 (1,790 seats)
- Surface: Grass
- Field size: 105 x 68 m

Tenant
- MFK Zvolen

Website
- www.futbalarena.sk

Futbal Aréna Zvolen is a home football stadium in Ružiná, Slovakia. It serves as home stadium for football club MFK Zvolen. The stadium has a capacity of 1,200 (500 seats).

== History ==
The stadium has a size of 105 x 68 m, with 4 small football fields next to it. It has a capacity of 1,870, of which 1,790 are seats. The stadium's record attendance was before its reconstruction. The 1999 Slovak Cup final between Slovan Bratislava and Banská Bystrica had an attendance of 10,048 spectators. The stadium's original capacity was 12,910 spectators. The reconstruction costed around 2 million euros. The stadium was the venue for the 2022 UEFA European Under-19 Championship.
