= Igor Ležaić =

Serbian footballer

Personal information
- Full name: Igor Ležaić
- Date of birth: 25 April 1988 (age 38)
- Place of birth: Belgrade, SFR Yugoslavia
- Height: 1.82 m (6 ft 0 in)
- Position: Forward

Senior career*
Years	Team	Apps	(Gls)
2005–2007	Radnički Beograd	47	(15)
2008	Palilulac Beograd	19	(5)
2009–2010	Srem Jakovo	51	(13)
2011	Drina Zvornik	13	(1)
2012–2013	Šamorín	30	(14)
2013	SFM Senec	13	(2)
2014	Šport Podbrezová	12	(2)
2015–2019	Omladinac Novi Banovci	106	(60)
Total		291	(112)

Managerial career
- 2023: Omladinac Novi Banovci
- * Club domestic league appearances and goals

Igor Ležaić (born 25 April 1988) is a Serbian retired footballer who played as a forward.
