= MFK Dolný Kubín =

Slovak football club

- Full name: Mestký futbalový klub Dolný Kubín
- Nickname: Dynamo
- Founded: 1920; 106 years ago
- Ground: Stadium MUDr. Ivan Chodák
- Capacity: 1,950 (730 seats)
- President: Boris Brašeň
- Head coach: Vacant
- League: 3. Liga
- 2025–26: 3. liga, 12th
- Website: www.mfk.dolnykubin.net
Home colours	Away colours

MFK Dolný Kubín is a Slovak football club located in Dolný Kubín. Since the 2009–10 season, the club played in the I.liga, which is the second division of Slovak football. The team plays at stadium Ivana Chodáka where the 2009 Slovak Super Cup between Slovan and Košice was played.

== Current squad ==
As of 3 July 2024 Note: Flags indicate national team as defined under FIFA eligibility rules; some limited exceptions apply. Players may hold more than one non-FIFA nationality.

No.	Pos.	Nation	Player
5	FW	FRA	Adama Diamé
7	MF	SVK	Filip Kolorédy
8	MF	SVK	Marek Machaj
9	MF	SVK	Samuel Brnča
10	MF	GHA	Derrick Mensah
12	MF	SVK	Jozef Strapec

No.	Pos.	Nation	Player
14	FW	GEO	Guram Goshteliani
16	MF	SVK	Gabriel Demian
17	MF	SVK	Peter Bača
18	DF	SVK	Lukáš Lupták
—	MF	SVK	Samuel Farský

For recent transfers, see List of Slovak football transfers summer 2023.

=== Out on loan ===
Note: Flags indicate national team as defined under FIFA eligibility rules; some limited exceptions apply. Players may hold more than one non-FIFA nationality.

No.	Pos.	Nation	Player

== Notable players ==
Had international caps for their respective countries

For full list, see here

- (Armenia) Gagik Daghbashyan
- (Czechoslovakia) Dušan Galis
- (Slovakia) Marián Had
- (Slovakia) Róbert Hanko
- (Moldova) Anatol Cheptine
- (Slovakia) Maroš Klimpl
- (Slovakia) Matúš Kozáčik
- (Slovakia) Ladislav Pecko
- (Niger) Siradji Sani
- (Slovakia) Dušan Tittel
- (Slovakia) Ivan Trabalík

== Managers ==
- (Slovakia) Vladimír Goffa (Oct 2008–Jan 2010)
- (Serbia) Petar Kurćubić (Jul 2009–Sep 2011)
- (Slovakia) Ladislav Molnár (Jul 2012–Jul 2013)
- (Slovakia) Jozef Sino (Jul 2013–Dec 2014)
- (Slovakia) Pavol Bača (Jan 2015–Sep 2015)
- (San Marino) Marco Ragini (Jul 2015–May 2016)
- (Slovakia) Pavol Bača (Jul 2016–Jul 2022)
- (Slovakia) Ladislav Pecko (Jul 2022–Jan 2023)
- (Slovakia) Ján Haspra (Jan 2023–May 2023)
