= Hector Tubonemi =

Nigerian footballer

Personal information
- Full name: Hector Tamunoibiton Tubonemi
- Date of birth: 31 March 1988 (age 38)
- Place of birth: Port Harcourt, Nigeria
- Height: 1.85 m (6 ft 1 in)
- Position: Forward

Team information
- Current team: Slovan Galanta

Youth career
- Christ the King FC of Port Harcourt

Senior career*
Years	Team	Apps	(Gls)
2007–2008	Jaslovské Bohunice	5	(1)
2008–2010	Dubnica	11	(1)
2009–2010	→ Podbrezová (loan)	22	(1)
2011–2015	Podbrezová	53	(24)
2014	→ Šamorín (loan)	9	(2)
2014	→ Michalovce (loan)	5	(0)
2015	→ Tatran Prešov (loan)	14	(5)
2015–2018	Tatran Prešov	45	(10)
2017	→ Trebišov (loan)		
2017	→ Tatran Prešov B (loan)	5	(2)
2018–2019	Slovan Šaľa		
2019–	Slovan Galanta		
- * Club domestic league appearances and goals as of 30 January 2018

Hector Tubonemi (born 5 September 1988) is a Nigerian footballer who currently plays for Slovan Galanta.

== Career ==
He started his football career with Christ the King FC of Port Harcourt and joined 2008 to Slovak club ŠK Blava Jaslovské Bohunice.

In 2014, Tubonemi joined MFK Zemplín Michalovce on a short term loan.

In 2015, he joined then 2. Liga club Tatran Presov. Tubonemi made his Slovak First Football League debut in a 1:0 loss against MFK Ružomberok, playing the full 90” minutes.

In 2019, Tubonemi joined FC Slovan Galanta.
