= Lukáčovce =

Lukáčovce Lakács
- Municipality
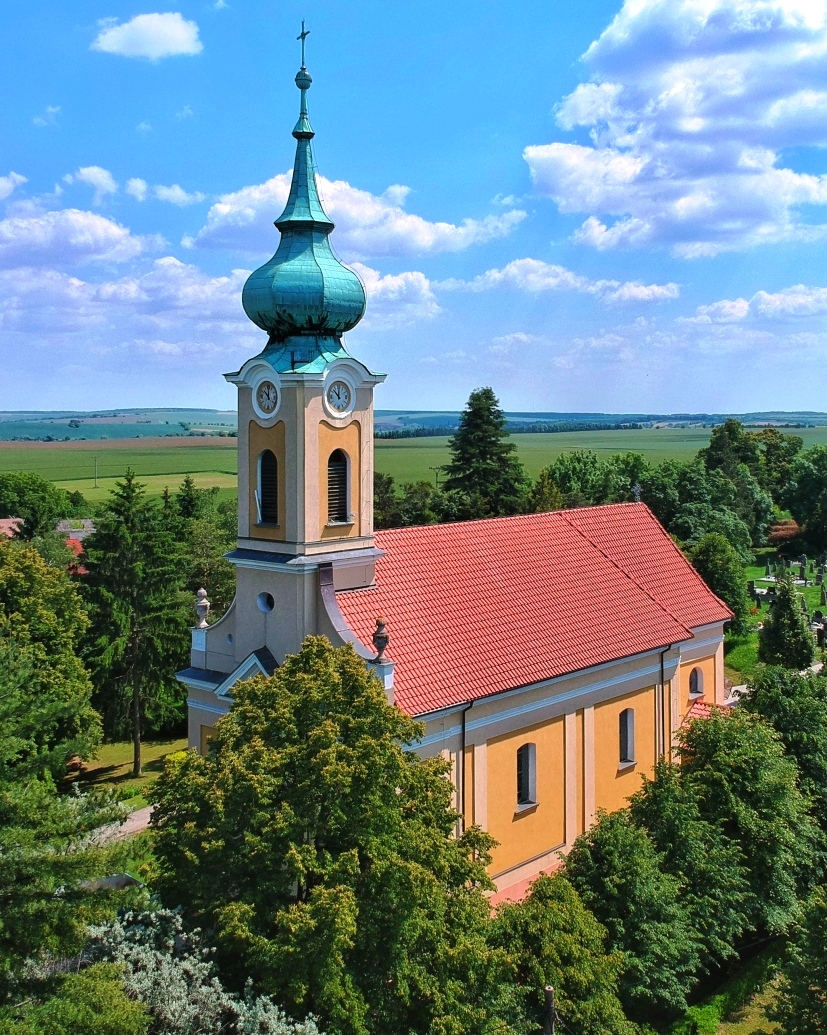

- Flag

- Location of Lukáčovce in the Nitra Region Location of Lukáčovce in Slovakia
- Coordinates: 48.40°N 17.93°E
- Country: Slovakia
- Region: Nitra Region
- District: Nitra District
- First mentioned: 1309

Area
  - Total: 16.83 km^{2} (6.50 sq mi)
- Elevation: 168 m (551 ft)

Population (2025)
  - Total: 1,161
- Time zone: UTC+1 (CET)
  - Summer (DST): UTC+2 (CEST)
- Postal code: 951 23
- Area code: +421 37
- Vehicle registration plate (until 2022): NR
- Website: lukacovce.sk

Lukáčovce (Hungarian: Lakács) is a village and municipality in the Nitra District in western central Slovakia, in the Nitra Region.

== History ==
In historical records the village was first mentioned in 1309.

== Geography ==
The municipality lies at an altitude of 168 metres (551 ft) and covers an area of 16.83 km^{2} (6.50 sq mi) (2025).

== Population ==
Population statistic (10 years)
Year	1995	2005	2015	2025
Count	1022	1101	1135	1161
Difference		+7.72%	+3.08%	+2.29%

Population statistic
Year	2024	2025
Count	1168	1161
Difference		−0.59%

It has a population of 1161 people (31 December 2025).

=== Ethnicity ===
Census 2021 (1+ %)
Ethnicity	Number	Fraction
Slovak	1137	97.42%
Not found out	29	2.48%
Total	1167	

In year 2021 was 1167 people by ethnicity 1137 as Slovak, 29 as Not found out, 5 as Czech, 3 as Romani, 2 as Irish, 1 as Ukrainian, 1 as Russian and 1 as Hungarian.

Note on population: The difference values of population numbers in the table "Population statistic" and in the sections "Ethnicity" & "Religion" is caused by the use of various statistical methods.

=== Religion ===
Census 2021 (1+ %)
Religion	Number	Fraction
Roman Catholic Church	967	82.86%
None	146	12.51%
Not found out	32	2.74%
Total	1167	

In year 2021 was 1167 people by religion 967 from Roman Catholic Church, 146 from None, 32 from Not found out, 8 from Evangelical Church, 6 from Christian Congregations in Slovakia, 4 from Ad hoc movements, 1 from Jewish community, 1 from Eastern Orthodox Church, 1 from Greek Catholic Church and 1 from Church of the Brethren.

== Facilities ==
The village has a public library, a gym and football pitch.
