= Alekšince =

Alekšince Elecske
- Municipality
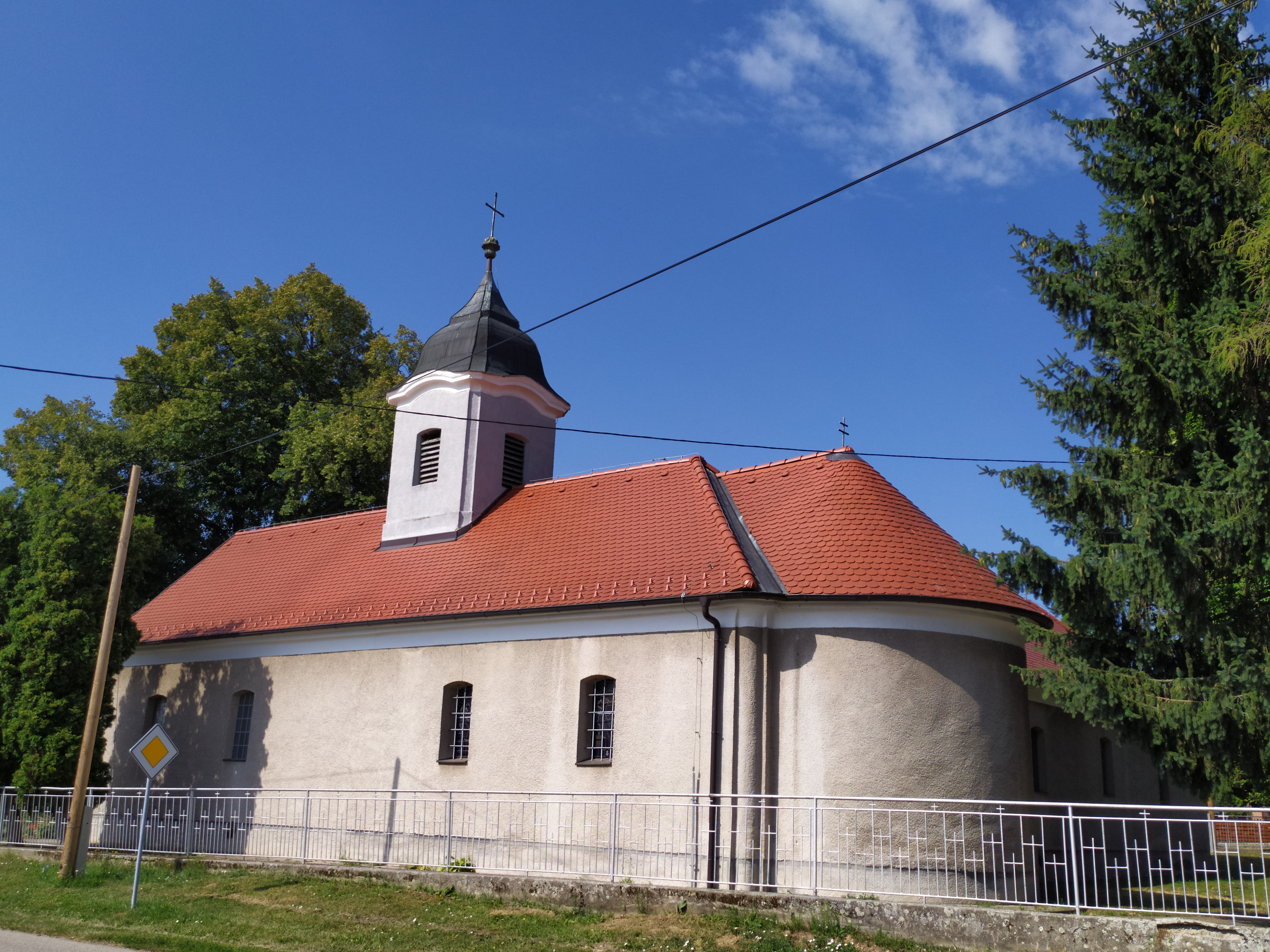
- Church of Saint Anne

- Flag

- Location of Alekšince in the Nitra Region Location of Alekšince in Slovakia
- Coordinates: 48.37°N 17.95°E
- Country: Slovakia
- Region: Nitra Region
- District: Nitra District
- First mentioned: 1156

Area
  - Total: 15.07 km^{2} (5.82 sq mi)
- Elevation: 162 m (531 ft)

Population (2025)
  - Total: 1,876
- Time zone: UTC+1 (CET)
  - Summer (DST): UTC+2 (CEST)
- Postal code: 951 22
- Area code: +421 37
- Vehicle registration plate (until 2022): NR
- Website: www.aleksince.sk

Alekšince (Hungarian: Elecske) is a village and a municipality in the Nitra District in western Slovakia, in the Nitra Region.

== History ==
According to archaeological evidence, the area was inhabited since the Paleolithic. The investigations on Maďaroš hill also revealed a settlement from the Bronze Age. Several items from the Iron Age and the Roman imperial period were discovered as well.

In historical records, the village was first mentioned in 1156 when Martirius, the archbishop of Esztergom, donated church lands in 70 villages to the Esztergom canonry in order to improve the economic welfare of the canons. One the villages of the archdeaconry was "villa Alexu"- known today as Alekšince. A deed of donation from 1275 by the king Ladislaus IV of Hungary lists the first owner: knight Deuse, who died during a Tatar invasion in 1241–1242. In this deed, the village appears under the name of Elekchy.

Before the establishment of independent Czechoslovakia in 1918, Alekšince was part of Nyitra County within the Kingdom of Hungary. From 1939 to 1945, it was part of the Slovak Republic.

== Coat of arms ==
Since the 18th century, the official seal has been in use. The seal depicts a female figure with an aureole, Saint Anne, the patron saint of the village.

On June 18, 1996, the local council authorized the coat of arms and an official village seal and flag. The coat of arms is a heraldic stylization of Saint Anne, who is usually depicted as a woman carrying a child and a book (Saint Anne was the mother of Virgin Mary). The book in the coat of arms represents the Old Testament, that promises the arrival of the Messiah, which Saint Anne uses to teach her daughter. The lily symbolizes the virginity of Mary. In Christian tradition, the combination of the two symbols is used exclusively for Saint Anne. The colour combination is determined by green as the main colour associated with Saint Anne. The book is yellow (golden) and the lily is white (gray). Alekšince's coat of arms therefore depicts a green field with silver lily over a closed golden book.

== Geography ==
The municipality lies at an altitude of 162 metres (531 ft) and covers an area of 15.07 km^{2} (5.82 sq mi) (2025).

Total area: 1507 ha

- Agricultural land: 1322.8 ha
- Arable land: 1255 ha
- Vineyards: 68.8 ha
- Non-agricultural land: 183,2 ha
- Forest land: 21 ha
- Built-up area: 134.2 ha

== Population ==
Population statistic (10 years)
Year	1995	2005	2015	2025
Count	1594	1682	1678	1876
Difference		+5.52%	−0.23%	+11.79%

Population statistic
Year	2024	2025
Count	1802	1876
Difference		+4.10%

It has a population of 1876 people (31 December 2025).

=== Ethnicity ===
Census 2021 (1+%)
Ethnicity	Number	Fraction
Slovak	1554	91.46%
Not found out	137	8.06%
Total	1699	

In year 2021 was 1699 people by ethnicity 1554 as Slovak, 137 as Not found out, 11 as Other, 9 as Hungarian, 6 as Czech, 4 as Romani, 1 as Russian and 1 as German.

Note on population: The difference values of population numbers in the table "Population statistic" and in the sections "Ethnicity" & "Religion" is caused by the use of various statistical methods.

=== Religion ===
Census 2021 (1+%)
Religion	Number	Fraction
Roman Catholic Church	1249	73.51%
None	232	13.66%
Not found out	130	7.65%
Evangelical Church	22	1.29%
Total	1699	

In year 2021 was 1699 people by religion 1249 from Roman Catholic Church, 232 from None, 130 from Not found out, 22 from Evangelical Church, 14 from Christian Congregations in Slovakia, 12 from Old Catholic Church, 9 from Jehovah's Witnesses, 6 from Ad hoc movements, 4 from Greek Catholic Church, 4 from United Methodist Church, 4 from Apostolic Church, 3 from Calvinist Church, 3 from Other, 3 from Buddhism, 2 from Paganism and natural spirituality and 2 from Islam.

== Facilities ==
The village has a public library, a gym, and a football pitch. There is also an elementary school and a kindergarten.

== Genealogical resources ==
The records for genealogical research are available at the state archive in Nitra (Slovak: Štátny archív v Nitre).

- Roman Catholic church records (births/marriages/deaths): 1789-1898
- Lutheran church records (births/marriages/deaths): 1783-1919
- Census records 1869 of Aleksince are available at the state archive.

== See also ==
- List of municipalities and towns in Slovakia
