= Štadión MUDr. Ivana Chodáka =

Football stadium in Dolný Kubín, Slovakia

Stadium MUDr. Ivan Chodák
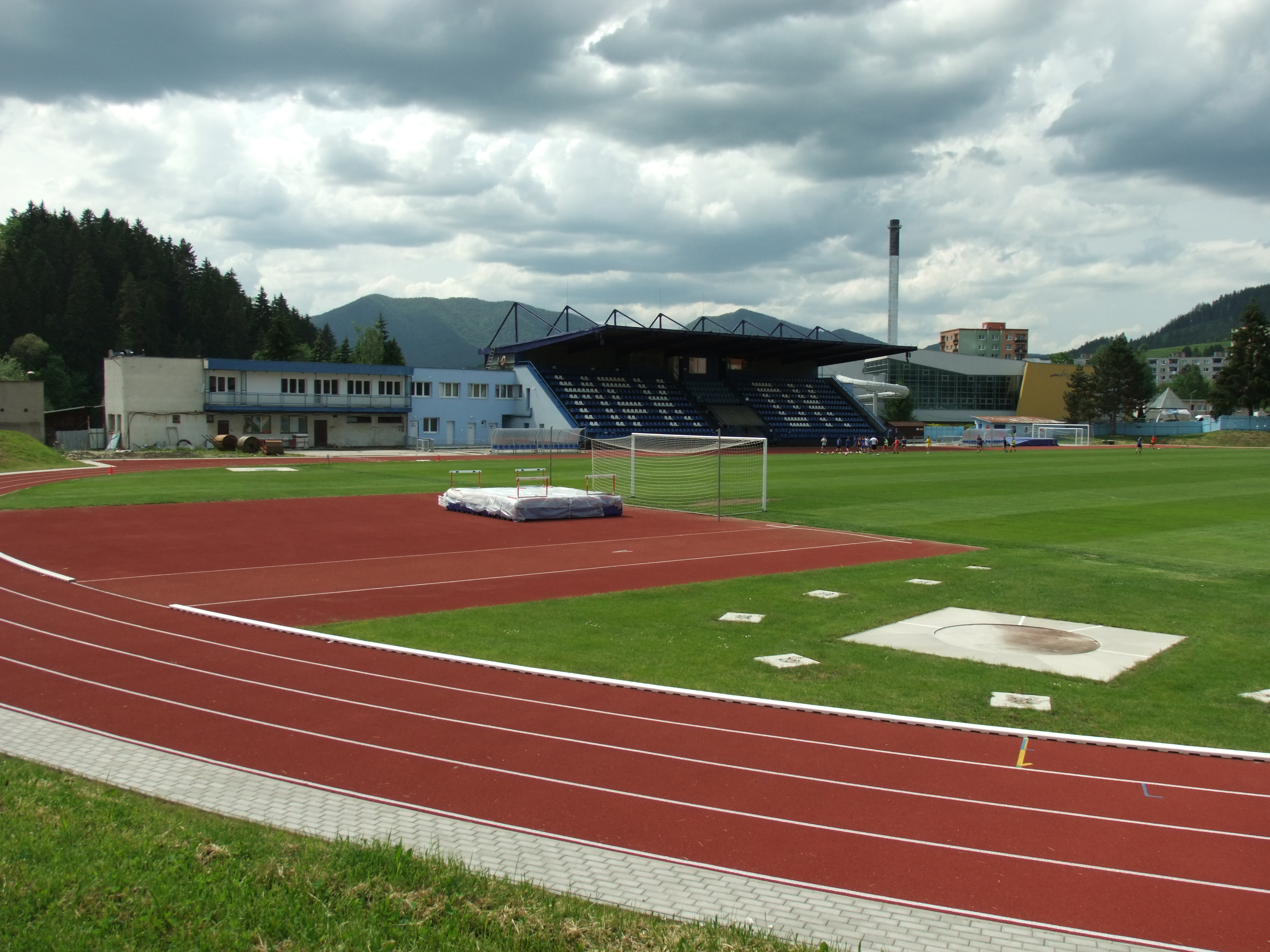
- Interactive map of Stadium MUDr. Ivan Chodák
- Location: Dolný Kubín, Slovakia
- Coordinates: 49°12.38′N 19°17.51′E
- Operator: MFK Dolný Kubín
- Capacity: 5,000 (730 seats)
- Surface: Grass
- Field size: 105 x 68 m

Tenant
- MFK Dolný Kubín

Stadium MUDr. Ivan Chodák (Slovak: Štadión MUDr. Ivana Chodáka) is a football stadium in Dolný Kubín, Slovakia. It serves as home stadium for football club MFK Dolný Kubín. The stadium has a capacity of 5,000 of which 730 are seats. The stadium is named after Ivan Chodák, an athlete and physician from Dolný Kubín.

== History ==
In 2009, the stadium hosted the Slovak Super Cup, a match between ŠK Slovan Bratislava and MFK Košice. The game was won 2–0 by Slovan.

In 2022, a 400-metre running track was constructed in the stadium. The cost exceeded 500,000 euros. the Slovak Athletics Association contributed 200,000 euros to the city through a subsidy, and the remaining funds were paid by the Dolny Kubín local government.

== See also ==
- List of football stadiums in Slovakia
