= TJ Baník Ružiná =

Baník Ružiná
- Full name: FK Baník Ružiná
- Nickname: Baníci (Miners)
- Founded: 1961
- Dissolved: 2014
- Ground: TJ Baník Stadium, Ružiná
- Capacity: 1,200 (500 seated)
- Owner: Jozef Líška
- Chairman: Juraj Vitek
- Head coach: Anton Jánoš (recently)
- League: 3. liga (recently)
- 3. liga (east): 3. liga, 1st (promoted)
- Website: http://www.banik.ruzina.eu/
Home colours	Away colours	Third colours

FK Baník Ružiná was a Slovak football team, based in the village of Ružiná. The club was founded in 1961. It merged with MFK Lokomotíva Zvolen in 2014.

== Notable players ==
Past (and present) players who are the subjects of Wikipedia articles can be found here.
