= Ružiná =

Ružiná Rózsaszállás
- Municipality
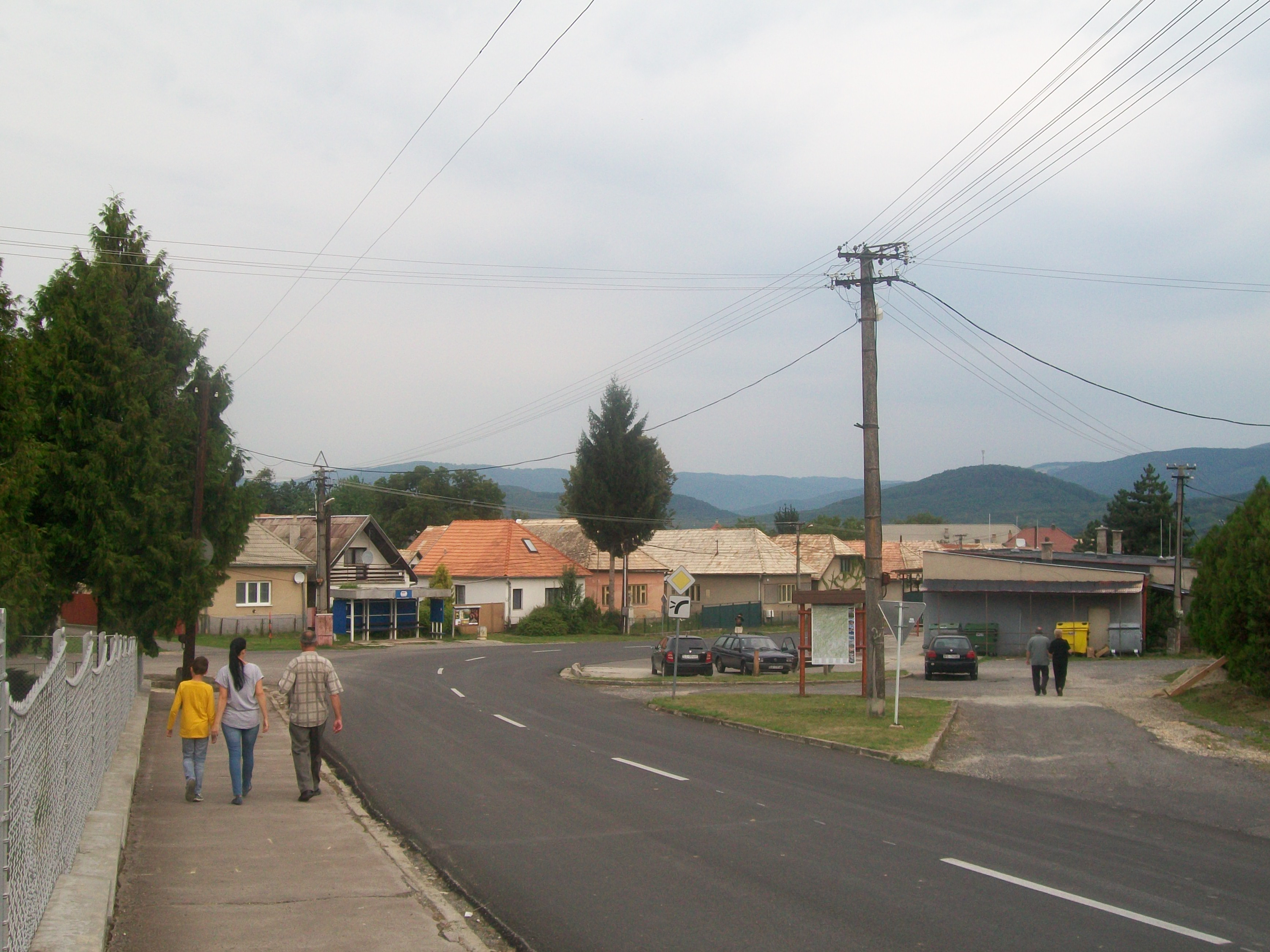

- Flag

- Location of Ružiná in the Banská Bystrica Region Location of Ružiná in Slovakia
- Coordinates: 48.43°N 19.55°E
- Country: Slovakia
- Region: Banská Bystrica Region
- District: Lučenec District
- First mentioned: 1499

Government
  - Mayor: Jozef Líška

Area
  - Total: 10.85 km^{2} (4.19 sq mi)
- Elevation: 268 m (879 ft)

Population (2025)
  - Total: 828
- Time zone: UTC+1 (CET)
  - Summer (DST): UTC+2 (CEST)
- Postal code: 985 52
- Area code: +421 47
- Vehicle registration plate (until 2022): LC
- Website: www.ruzina.eu

Ružiná (Hungarian: Rózsaszállás) is a village and municipality in the Lučenec District in the Banská Bystrica Region of Slovakia. The town's attractions include the Ružiná dam and the Divín Castle. The town is home to the Church of St. František Assiský-the oldest building in the town, dating back to the mid-18th century.

== Geography ==
The municipality lies at an altitude of 268 metres (879 ft) and covers an area of 10.85 km^{2} (4.19 sq mi) (2025).

== Population ==
Population statistic (10 years)
Year	1995	2005	2015	2025
Count	829	861	865	828
Difference		+3.86%	+0.46%	−4.27%

Population statistic
Year	2024	2025
Count	828	828
Difference		+1.42%

It has a population of 828 people (31 December 2025).

=== Ethnicity ===
Census 2021 (1+ %)
Ethnicity	Number	Fraction
Slovak	810	97%
Not found out	24	2.87%
Total	835	

In year 2021 was 835 people by ethnicity 810 as Slovak, 24 as Not found out, 4 as Hungarian, 3 as Czech, 1 as Romani and 1 as Other.

Note on population: The difference values of population numbers in the table "Population statistic" and in the sections "Ethnicity" & "Religion" is caused by the use of various statistical methods.

=== Religion ===
Census 2021 (1+ %)
Religion	Number	Fraction
Roman Catholic Church	600	71.86%
None	143	17.13%
Not found out	35	4.19%
Evangelical Church	26	3.11%
Christian Congregations in Slovakia	15	1.8%
Total	835	

In year 2021 was 835 people by religion 600 from Roman Catholic Church, 143 from None, 35 from Not found out, 26 from Evangelical Church, 15 from Christian Congregations in Slovakia, 6 from Greek Catholic Church, 2 from Paganism and natural spirituality, 2 from Baptists Church, 1 from Other, 1 from Hinduism, 1 from Czechoslovak Hussite Church, 1 from Seventh-day Adventist Church, 1 from Apostolic Church and 1 from Ad hoc movements.
