= 2013–14 MFK Košice season =

Slovak football club season

Košice
2013–14 season
- Chairman: Blažej Podolák
- Manager: Ján Kozák (until 2 July 2013); Jaroslav Galko (from 2 July 2013 until 18 September 2013); Radoslav Látal (from 18 September 2013)
- Stadium: Štadión Lokomotívy v Čermeli
- Slovak First Football League: 5th
- Slovak Cup: Winners
- Top goalscorer: League: Erik Pačinda (8); All: Oumar Diaby; Erik Pačinda (9 each)
- Highest home attendance: 6,852 v Slovan Bratislava (11 August 2013, Slovak First Football League)
- Lowest home attendance: 1,220 v Ružomberok (17 September 2013, Slovak First Football League)
- Average home league attendance: 2,480
- Biggest win: 4–1 v DAC Dunajská Streda (Home, 14 September 2013, Slovak First Football League); 3–0 v Ružomberok (Away, 8 March 2014, Slovak First Football League); 4–1 v Ružomberok (Home, 15 April 2014, Slovak Cup)
- Biggest defeat: 0–5 v Trenčín (Away, 23 November 2013, Slovak First Football League)

The 2013–14 season was Mestský Futbalový Klub Košice's 8th consecutive season in Slovak First Football League. In addition to the domestic league, Košice participated in this season's editions of Slovak Cup.

== Squad ==
Note: Flags indicate national team as defined under FIFA eligibility rules; some limited exceptions apply. Players may hold more than one non-FIFA nationality.

No.	Pos.	Nation	Player
1	GK	SVK	Matúš Ružinský
2	DF	SRB	Boris Sekulić
4	DF	SRB	Ivan Ostojić
5	DF	SVK	Tomáš Huk
6	MF	SVK	Jozef Skvašík
7	FW	SVK	Tomáš Kubík
9	FW	SVK	Erik Pačinda
10	DF	SVK	Peter Šinglár (captain)
11	FW	FRA	Oumar Diaby
12	DF	SVK	Ľubomír Korijkov
14	DF	SVK	František Pavúk
15	DF	SVK	Mikuláš Tóth

No.	Pos.	Nation	Player
16	MF	SVK	Peter Kavka
17	MF	SVK	Boris Gáll
18	MF	SVK	Lukáš Urban
19	MF	SVK	Miroslav Viazanko (vice-captain)
24	DF	SRB	Lazar Đorđević
25	GK	MKD	Darko Tofiloski
27	FW	BIH	Nermin Haskić
28	MF	SVK	Martin Bukata
31	MF	SVK	Mojmír Trebuňák
37	FW	SVK	Ján Novák (on loan from Prešov)
38	DF	SVK	Peter Bašista (vice-captain)
—	MF	CZE	Lukáš Bajer

== Transfers ==
=== Summer ===
In: Note: Flags indicate national team as defined under FIFA eligibility rules; some limited exceptions apply. Players may hold more than one non-FIFA nationality.

No.	Pos.	Nation	Player
—	FW	SVK	Erik Pačinda (loan return from (France) Tours FC)
—	FW	SVK	Tomáš Kubík (loan return from MŠK Rimavská Sobota)
—	MF	SVK	Kamil Kuzma (loan return from ŠK SFM Senec)
—	DF	SVK	Ľubomír Korijkov (loan return from MFK Zemplín Michalovce)
—	FW	BIH	Nermin Haskić (from (Serbia) FK Voždovac)
—	DF	SRB	Lazar Đorđević (from (North Macedonia) FK Sileks)
37	FW	SVK	Ján Novák (on loan from 1. FC Tatran Prešov)

Out: Note: Flags indicate national team as defined under FIFA eligibility rules; some limited exceptions apply. Players may hold more than one non-FIFA nationality.

No.	Pos.	Nation	Player
17	MF	SVK	Peter Gál-Andrezly (End of contract)
23	MF	SRB	Uroš Matić (to (Portugal) Benfica)
24	MF	SVK	Kamil Karaš (End of contract and he joined to (Czech Republic) SK Sigma Olomouc)
—	MF	SVK	Kamil Kuzma (End of contract and he joined to FC Spartak Trnava)
—	GK	SVK	Roland Repiský (End of contract)

=== Winter ===
In: Note: Flags indicate national team as defined under FIFA eligibility rules; some limited exceptions apply. Players may hold more than one non-FIFA nationality.

No.	Pos.	Nation	Player

Out: Note: Flags indicate national team as defined under FIFA eligibility rules; some limited exceptions apply. Players may hold more than one non-FIFA nationality.

No.	Pos.	Nation	Player
—	DF	SVK	Radoslav Gondoľ (End of contract)
—	MF	SVK	Juraj Hovančík (End of contact)
—	FW	FRA	Karim Coulibaly Diaby (on loan to (Czech Republic) MFK Karviná)
—	MF	SVK	Ondrej Duda (to (Poland) Legia Warsaw)

== Competitions ==
=== Overview ===
Competition	First match	Last match	Starting round	Final position	Record							
Competition	First match	Last match	Starting round	Final position	Pld	W	D	L	GF	GA	GD	Win %
Slovak First Football League	13 July 2013	31 May 2014	Matchday 1	5th	33	13	7	13	41	40	+1	39.39
Slovak Cup	28 August 2013	1 May 2014	Second round	Winners	7	5	2	0	14	5	+9	71.43
Total					40	18	9	13	55	45	+10	45.00

Source: Competitions

=== Slovak First Football League ===
==== League table ====
Pos	Team	Pld	W	D	L	GF	GA	GD	Pts	Qualification or relegation
3	Spartak Trnava	33	16	5	12	47	42	+5	53	Qualification for Europa League first qualifying round
4	Ružomberok	33	15	5	13	56	51	+5	50	
5	Košice	33	13	7	13	41	40	+1	46	Qualification for Europa League second qualifying round (Note: 2013–14 Slovak Cup winners Košice qualified for the second qualifying round of the 2014–15 UEFA Europa League.)
6	Senica	33	13	7	13	45	47	−2	46	
7	Myjava	33	13	6	14	45	54	−9	45	

Source: Niké liga (in Slovak)
Rules for classification: 1) points; 2) goal difference; 3) number of goals scored.

==== Results summary ====
Overall								Home						Away					
Pld	W	D	L	GF	GA	GD	Pts	W	D	L	GF	GA	GD	W	D	L	GF	GA	GD
33	13	7	13	41	40	+1	46	9	3	5	27	19	+8	4	4	8	14	21	−7

Source: Corgoň Liga

==== Results by round ====
Round	1	2	3	4	5	6	7	8	9	10	11	12	13	14	15	16	17	18	19	20	21	22	23	24	25	26	27	28	29	30	31	32	33
Ground	H	A	H	A	H	A	H	A	H	H	A	A	H	A	H	A	H	A	H	A	A	H	H	A	H	A	H	A	H	A	H	H	A
Result	W	L	W	D	L	L	L	L	W	D	L	D	W	W	L	D	W	L	W	D	W	W	D	W	W	L	L	L	D	W	W	L	L
Position	3	6	6	6	7	8	9	10	10	9	10	10	10	8	9	10	9	9	9	9	7	5	6	5	3	5	7	8	8	5	4	5	5
Points	3	3	6	7	7	7	7	7	10	11	11	12	15	18	18	19	22	22	25	26	29	32	33	36	39	39	39	39	40	43	46	46	46

Source: Corgoň Liga
A = Away; H = Home; W = Win; D = Draw; L = Loss

==== Matches ====
13 July 2013 1	Košice	2–0	ViOn Zlaté Moravce	Košice
17:00 CEST (UTC+2)	Bukata (yellow card) 27'; Viazanko 29'; Diaby 90'	Report	Farkaš (yellow card) 58'	Stadium: Štadión Lokomotívy v Čermeli; Attendance: 1,860; Referee: Kamil Horváth; Assistant referees: Ondrej Brendza, Karol Poláček

20 July 2013 2	Dukla Banská Bystrica	1–0	Košice	Banská Bystrica
19:30 CEST (UTC+2)	Jurčo 36', (yellow card) 58'; Savić (yellow card) 45'	Report	Šinglár (yellow card) 63'; Viazanko (yellow card) 71'	Stadium: Štadión SNP; Attendance: 2,642; Referee: Pavol Šuniar; Assistant referees: Roman Slyško, Dušan Petríček

27 July 2013 3	Košice	4–2	Nitra	Košice
17:00 CEST (UTC+2)	Sekulić 29'; Pačinda 51', (yellow card) 51'; Viazanko 56'; Duda 73', (yellow card) 80'	Report	Kolmokov (yellow card) 16'; Gajdoš (yellow card) 27'; Kaspřák (yellow card) 32'; Benčík 40', 90'; Hála (yellow card) 54'	Stadium: Štadión Lokomotívy v Čermeli; Attendance: 1,895; Referee: Richard Trutz; Assistant referees: Tomáš Somoláni, Dušan Kubačka

3 August 2013 4	Spartak Trnava	0–0	Košice	Trnava
17:30 CEST (UTC+2)	Sabo (yellow card) 47'	Report		Stadium: Anton Malatinský Stadium; Attendance: 3,027; Referee: Vladimír Vnuk; Assistant referees: Radomír Sluk, Dušan Hrčka

11 August 2013 5	Košice	0–1	Slovan Bratislava	Košice
17:30 CEST (UTC+2)	Šinglár (yellow card) 31'; Viazanko (yellow card) 83'; Tofiloski (yellow card) 90'	Report	Žofčák (yellow card) 31'; Niňaj 58'; Mészáros (yellow card) 81'; Putnocký (yellow card) 86'; Halenár (yellow card) 89'; Peltier (yellow card) 90'	Stadium: Štadión Lokomotívy v Čermeli; Attendance: 6,852; Referee: Ľubomír Samotný; Assistant referees: Peter Chládek, Juraj Lieskovský

17 August 2013 6	Senica	1–0	Košice	Senica
19:30 CEST (UTC+2)	Kalabiška 44', (yellow card) 90'	Report	Viazanko (yellow card) 58'; Hovančík (yellow card) 76'	Stadium: Štadión FK Senica; Attendance: 2,349; Referee: Peter Kráľovič; Assistant referees: Tomáš Vorel, Peter Bednár

24 August 2013 7	Košice	0–1	Trenčín	Košice
17:00 CEST (UTC+2)	Pačinda (yellow card) 31'; Bukata (yellow card) 67'; Hovančík (yellow card) 74'	Report	Hajradinović (yellow card) 30'; Kleščík (yellow card) 35'; Baéz (yellow card) 37'; Holúbek 53'; Čögley (yellow card) 69'	Stadium: Štadión Lokomotívy v Čermeli; Attendance: 2,730; Referee: Gabriel Michlian; Assistant referees: Roman Slyško, Mária Súkeníková

31 August 2013 8	Myjava	1–0	Košice	Myjava
20:00 CEST (UTC+2)	Marček (yellow card) 37' (red card) 49'; Kuračka 76'; Černáček (yellow card) 90'	Report	Duda (yellow card) 51'; Šinglár (yellow card) 59'; Bašista (red card) 90'	Stadium: Stadium Myjava; Attendance: 2,276; Referee: Miroslav Fajčík; Assistant referees: Dušan Kubačka, Juraj Lieskovský

14 September 2013 9	Košice	4–1	DAC Dunajská Streda	Košice
14:30 CEST (UTC+2)	Duda 45'; Pačinda 47', 55', 63'	Report	Hudák (yellow card) 17'; Matúš (yellow card) 19'; Gabriel (yellow card) 34'; Kwin (yellow card) 43'; Szarka (yellow card) 67'; Majerník 73'; Adiaba (yellow card) 84'	Stadium: Štadión Lokomotívy v Čermeli; Attendance: 1,720; Referee: Michal Smolák; Assistant referees: Milan Cuninka, Martin Borsányi

17 September 2013 10	Košice	2–2	Ružomberok	Košice
15:30 CEST (UTC+2)	Duda 2', (yellow card) 38'; Kavka (yellow card) 29'; Sekulić (yellow card) 45'; Diaby (yellow card) 56'; Hovančík (yellow card) 57' (red card) 74'; Haskić 73', (yellow card) 83'	Report	Nikolić (red card) 20'; Lačný 58'; Ďubek (yellow card) 61'; Zreľák (yellow card) 71'; Tawamba 90'	Stadium: Štadión Lokomotívy v Čermeli; Attendance: 1,220; Referee: Miroslav Jaška; Assistant referees: Radomír Sluk, František Ferenc

21 September 2013 11	Žilina	2–0	Košice	Žilina
17:30 CEST (UTC+2)	Jelić (yellow card) 8'; Gergel (yellow card) 71'; Majtán 74'; Pich 81'	Report	Ostojić (yellow card) 15'	Stadium: Štadión pod Dubňom; Attendance: 1,518; Referee: Ladislav Prešinský; Assistant referees: Tomáš Somoláni, Martin Špivák

28 September 2013 12	ViOn Zlaté Moravce	1–1	Košice	Zlaté Moravce
17:30 CEST (UTC+2)	Pavlenda (yellow card) 49'; Pintér (yellow card) 55', (goal) 64'; Bolinha (yellow card) 87'; Obročník (yellow card) 90'	Report	Šinglár (yellow card) 60'; Bukata 73'; Tofiloski (yellow card) 87'	Stadium: Štadión FC ViOn; Attendance: 1,240; Referee: Marek Mastiš; Assistant referees: Miroslav Benko, Marián Jankovič

5 October 2013 13	Košice	3–1	Dukla Banská Bystrica	Košice
14:30 CEST (UTC+2)	Sekulić (yellow card) 30'; Bašista (yellow card) 33'; Pačinda 52'; Duda 56'; Novák 69'	Report	Vajda 16'; Savić (yellow card) 29'; Chrien (yellow card) 38'; Slančík (red card) 45'	Stadium: Štadión Lokomotívy v Čermeli; Attendance: 1,930; Referee: Richard Trutz; Assistant referees: Roman Slyško, Michal Tomčík

19 October 2013 14	Nitra	2–3	Košice	Nitra
17:30 CEST (UTC+2)	Cléber 31'; Bagi (yellow card) 36'; Boszorád 63'; Gajdoš (yellow card) 81'	Report	Hovančík (yellow card) 26'; Pačinda 42', 72'; Šinglár (yellow card) 63', (goal) 70'	Stadium: Štadión pod Zoborom; Attendance: 550; Referee: Ľubomír Samotný; Assistant referees: Tomáš Mókoš, Marián Jankovič

26 October 2013 15	Košice	1–3	Spartak Trnava	Košice
13:30 CEST (UTC+2)	Diaby 28'; Tofiloski (yellow card) 46'; Sekulić (yellow card) 54'; Novák (yellow card) 90'	Report	Vlasko 34'; Chovanec 39'; Adámik (yellow card) 44'; Kuzma (yellow card) 45'; Sabo 47' (pen.); Ma. Tóth (yellow card) 59'; Augustini (yellow card) 66'	Stadium: Štadión Lokomotívy v Čermeli; Attendance: 3,616; Referee: Mário Vlk; Assistant referees: Dušan Hrčka, František Ferenc

3 November 2013 16	Slovan Bratislava	1–1	Košice	Bratislava
16:00 CET (UTC+1)	Niňaj 31'	Report	Hovančík (yellow card) 41'; Haskić 52'; Tofiloski (yellow card) 90'; Sekulić (yellow card) 90'	Stadium: Pasienky; Attendance: 998; Referee: Pavol Chmura; Assistant referees: Michal Tomčík, Rastislav Žákech

9 November 2013 17	Košice	3–1	Senica	Košice
13:30 CET (UTC+1)	Viazanko 4', 38'; Duda 30' (pen.); Šinglár (yellow card) 36'; Diaby (yellow card) 83'	Report	Ventúra (yellow card) 22'; Cristovam (yellow card) 30'; Pavlík (yellow card) 36'; Diarrassouba 81'; Jirásek (yellow card) 90'	Stadium: Štadión Lokomotívy v Čermeli; Attendance: 1,620; Referee: Ján Valášek; Assistant referees: Peter Chládek, Radoslav Bobko

23 November 2013 18	Trenčín	5–0	Košice	Trenčín
17:30 CET (UTC+1)	Van Kessel 45', 63'; Malec 67', 74'; Hajradinović 88'	Report	Diaby (yellow card) 90'	Stadium: Štadión na Sihoti; Attendance: 2,444; Referee: Vladimír Hracho; Assistant referees: Tomáš Vorel, Mária Súkeníková

30 November 2013 19	Košice	2–1	Myjava	Košice
13:00 CET (UTC+1)	Novák 22'; Šinglár (yellow card) 34'; Kavka 55'; Hovančík (yellow card) 85'	Report	Lukšík (yellow card) 31'; Šulek (yellow card) 44'; Siva (yellow card) 68', (goal) 69'	Stadium: Štadión Lokomotívy v Čermeli; Attendance: 1,720; Referee: Anton Ihring; Assistant referees: Tomáš Mókoš, Dušan Kubačka

1 March 2014 20	DAC Dunajská Streda	0–0	Košice	Dunajská Streda
16:30 CET (UTC+1)	Krišto (yellow card) 16'; Čaušić (yellow card) 26'; Straka (yellow card) 30'; N'Guekam (yellow card) 90'	Report	Sekulić (yellow card) 13'; Đorđević (yellow card) 35' (red card) 51'; Šinglár (yellow card) 66'; Viazanko (yellow card) 90'	Stadium: DAC Stadion; Attendance: 3,225; Referee: Richard Trutz; Assistant referees: Tomáš Somoláni, Branislav Hancko

8 March 2014 21	Ružomberok	0–3	Košice	Ružomberok
15:00 CET (UTC+1)		Report	Korijkov (yellow card) 17'; Diaby 37', 43'; Kavka (yellow card) 49'; Viazanko (yellow card) 82'; Novák 83'	Stadium: Štadión MFK Ružomberok; Attendance: 2,346; Referee: Mário Vlk; Assistant referees: Rastislav Žákech, Mário Roszbeck

15 March 2014 22	Košice	1–0	Žilina	Košice
13:30 CET (UTC+1)	Sekulić 11'; Novák (yellow card) 90'	Report	Pečovský (yellow card) 90'	Stadium: Štadión Lokomotívy v Čermeli; Attendance: 2,234; Referee: Peter Kráľovič; Assistant referees: Tomáš Mókoš, Peter Jenčura

22 March 2014 23	Košice	0–0	ViOn Zlaté Moravce	Košice
13:30 CET (UTC+1)	Bašista (yellow card) 79'	Report	Bolinha (yellow card) 79'; Pavlenda (yellow card) 81'	Stadium: Štadión Lokomotívy v Čermeli; Attendance: 2,180; Referee: Ján Valášek; Assistant referees: Juraj Lieskovský, Martin Špivák

29 March 2014 24	Dukla Banská Bystrica	0–1	Košice	Banská Bystrica
15:00 CET (UTC+1)	Savić (yellow card) 25'; Kliment (yellow card) 80'; Ľupták (yellow card) 83'; Šovčík (yellow card) 86'	Report	Kavka (yellow card) 45'; Šinglár 76', (yellow card) 81'; Diaby (yellow card) 90'	Stadium: Štadión SNP; Attendance: 1,490; Referee: Ladislav Prešinský; Assistant referees: Ondrej Brendza, Michal Tomčík

5 April 2014 25	Košice	1–0	Nitra	Košice
15:30 CEST (UTC+2)	Novák (yellow card) 32'; Haskić 58'; Diaby (yellow card) 63'; Korijkov (yellow card) 68'	Report	Kolbas (yellow card) 56'; Kostelný (yellow card) 63'; Forbs (yellow card) 89'	Stadium: Štadión Lokomotívy v Čermeli; Attendance: 1,822; Referee: Roman Matúš; Assistant referees: Dušan Kubačka, Branislav Hancko

12 April 2014 26	Spartak Trnava	1–0	Košice	Trnava
15:30 CEST (UTC+2)	Chovanec 33'; Grabež (yellow card) 35'; Procházka (yellow card) 51'	Report	Tofiloski (yellow card) 4'; Haskić (yellow card) 7'; Kavka (yellow card) 51'; Bašista (yellow card) 76'	Stadium: Anton Malatinský Stadium; Attendance: 2,986; Referee: Patrik Hrčka; Assistant referees: Roman Slyško, Peter Bóllo

19 April 2014 27	Košice	0–2	Slovan Bratislava	Košice
15:00 CEST (UTC+2)	Sekulić (yellow card) 62'	Report	Halenár 63' (pen.); Bagi (yellow card) 76'; Vittek 90'	Stadium: Štadión Lokomotívy v Čermeli; Attendance: 6,550; Referee: Kamil Horváth; Assistant referees: Ondrej Brendza, Karol Poláček

26 April 2014 39	Senica	3–2	Košice	Senica
17:30 CEST (UTC+2)	Irobiso (yellow card) 14'; Cristovam 19'; Mazáň (yellow card) 38'; Kalabiška 40'; Pavlík (yellow card) 57'; Gava (yellow card) 64'; Piroska 69', (red card) 84'	Report	Pačinda 9', (yellow card) 76'; Sekulić (yellow card) 21'; Šinglár 23'; Diaby (yellow card) 47'; Kavka (yellow card) 68'	Stadium: Štadión FK Senica; Attendance: 1,385; Referee: Roman Matúš; Assistant referees: Peter Bednár, Branislav Hancko

4 May 2014 29	Košice	1–1	Trenčín	Košice
16:30 CEST (UTC+2)	Haskić 36'; Pačinda (yellow card) 53'; Huk (yellow card) 62'; Sekulić (yellow card) 63'	Report	Rundić (yellow card) 16'; Kleščík (yellow card) 24'; Holúbek 46'	Stadium: Štadión Lokomotívy v Čermeli; Attendance: 1,380; Referee: Boris Marhefka; Assistant referees: Miroslav Benko, Radomír Sluk

10 May 2014 30	Myjava	0–1	Košice	Myjava
17:30 CEST (UTC+2)	Černáček (yellow card) 55'; Duga (yellow card) 90'	Report	Kavka (yellow card) 60'; Viazanko 89'	Stadium: Stadium Myjava; Attendance: 1,621; Referee: Július Straka; Assistant referees: Roman Slyško, Marián Jankovič

17 May 2014 31	Košice	2–1	DAC Dunajská Streda	Košice
17:30 CEST (UTC+2)	Novák 11', (yellow card) 86'; Diaby 36'; Korijkov (yellow card) 52'	Report	O. Szabó (yellow card) 41', (goal) 48'; Straka (yellow card) 45'; N'Guekam (yellow card) 73'; Čaušić (yellow card) 75' (red card) 87'	Stadium: Štadión Lokomotívy v Čermeli; Attendance: 1,280; Referee: Jozef Pavlík; Assistant referees: Dušan Kubačka, Rastislav Žákech

20 May 2014 32	Košice	1–2	Ružomberok	Košice
17:30 CEST (UTC+2)	Skvašík 17'	Report	Almaský 7'; Maslo (yellow card) 21'; Kováč (red card) 36'; Zreľák 66'	Stadium: Štadión Lokomotívy v Čermeli; Attendance: 1,550; Referee: Vladimír Hracho; Assistant referees: Juraj Lieskovský, Martin Vindiš

31 May 2014 33	Žilina	3–2	Košice	Žilina
17:30 CEST (UTC+2)	Jelić 14', 81', (yellow card) 85'; Guba 36'	Report	Haskić 34'; Šinglár (yellow card) 76'; Sekulić 79'	Stadium: Štadión pod Dubňom; Attendance: 1,073; Referee: Pavol Šuniar; Assistant referees: Martin Balko, Martin Klovanič

=== Slovak Cup ===
28 August 2013 Second round	Baník Ružiná	1–3	Košice	Ružiná
17:00 CEST (UTC+2)	Caban (red card) 32'; Cibuľa (yellow card) 43'; Gajdošík 83'	Report	Viazanko 20', 37'; Pačinda (yellow card) 22', (goal) 33'; Ostojić (yellow card) 38'	Stadium: TJ Baník Stadium; Attendance: 500; Referee: Miroslav Jaška; Assistant referees: Mária Súkeníková, Tomáš Vorel

24 September 2013 Third round	Sereď	1–1 (2–3 p)	Košice	Sereď
16:00 CEST (UTC+2)	Morong (yellow card) 61'; Vaško (yellow card) 86'; Scherhaufer 87', (yellow card) 88'	Report	Diaby (yellow card) 33'; Duda (yellow card) 56'; Hovančík 63'	Stadium: Štadión Sereď; Attendance: 846; Referee: Patrik Hrčka; Assistant referees: Martin Balko, Peter Chládek
Note: Košice won 3–2 on penalties.

22 October 2013 Quarter-finals First leg	Tatran Prešov	1–2	Košice	Prešov
16:30 CEST (UTC+2)	Dolný 61'; Krajník (yellow card) 67'	Report	Diaby 10', 73'; Šinglár (yellow card) 38'; Ostojić (red card) 60'; Duda (yellow card) 81'; Tofiloski (yellow card) 84'	Stadium: Štadión 1. FC Tatran Prešov; Attendance: 1,276; Referee: Kamil Horváth; Assistant referees: Dušan Petríček, Branislav Hancko; Fourth official: Patrik Hrčka

6 November 2013 Quarter-finals Second leg	Košice	2–0 (4–1 agg.)	Tatran Prešov	Košice
13:30 CET (UTC+1)	Diaby (yellow card) 28'; Novák 83', 86'	Report	Lipták (yellow card) 13'; Petráš (yellow card) 85'	Stadium: Štadión Lokomotívy v Čermeli; Attendance: 2,200; Referee: Pavol Chmura; Assistant referees: Tomáš Vorel, Dušan Kubačka; Fourth official: Ľuboš Kačenga
Note: Košice won 4–1 on aggregate.

8 April 2014 Semi-finals First leg	Ružomberok	0–0	Košice	Ružomberok
16:30 CEST (UTC+2)	Lovás (yellow card) 32'; Zošák (yellow card) 43'	Report	Pačinda (yellow card) 40'; Viazanko (yellow card) 76'	Stadium: Štadión MFK Ružomberok; Attendance: 1,513; Referee: Ivan Kružliak; Assistant referees: Tomáš Somoláni, Radomír Sluk; Fourth official: Tomáš Vorel

15 April 2014 Semi-finals Second leg	Košice	4–1 (4–1 agg.)	Ružomberok	Košice
16:30 CEST (UTC+2)	Diaby 56'; Novák 73', 84'; Pačinda (yellow card) 78'; Bašista 78'	Report	Lovás 55'; Kotora (yellow card) 84'	Stadium: Štadión Lokomotívy v Čermeli; Attendance: 2,080; Referee: Mário Vlk; Assistant referees: Juraj Lieskovský, Mário Roszbeck; Fourth official: Radoslav Bobko
Note: Košice won 4–1 on aggregate.

1 May 2014 Final	Slovan Bratislava	1–2	Košice	Myjava
18:20 CEST (UTC+2)	Vittek 6'; Milinković (yellow card) 50'	Report	Diaby 31'; Bukata 74'; Korijkov (yellow card) 80'; Šinglár (yellow card) 90'	Stadium: Stadium Myjava; Attendance: 2,647; Referee: Miroslav Jaška; Assistant referees: Martin Balko, Dušan Kubačka; Fourth official: Dušan Hrčka
