= 2014 Slovak Cup final =

2014 Slovnaft Cup final
- Event: 2013–14 Slovak Cup
Slovan Bratislava	MFK Košice
1	2
- Date: 1 May 2014
- Venue: Stadium Myjava, Myjava
- Referee: Miroslav Jaška
- Attendance: 2,647

The 2014 Slovnaft Cup final was the final match of the 2013–14 Slovak Cup, the 45th season of the top cup competition in Slovak football. The match was played at the Stadium Myjava in Myjava on 1 May 2014 between ŠK Slovan Bratislava and MFK Košice. MFK Košice defeated Slovan Bratislava 2-1.

== Route to the final ==
Slovan Bratislava		Round	Košice
Opponent	Result	2013–14 Slovak Cup	Opponent	Result
Nové Mesto nad Váhom	5–0	Second Round	Baník Ružiná	3–1
Dunajská Lužná	3–0	Third Round	Sereď	2–1
Žilina	3–1, 2–0 (4–1 agg.)	Quarter-finals	Tatran Prešov	2–1, 2–0 (4–1 agg.)
Senica	3–1, 3–0 (6–1 agg.)	Semi-finals	Ružomberok	0–0, 4–1 (4–1 agg.)

== Match ==
=== Details ===
1 May 2014
18:20 CEST

Slovan Bratislava	1–2	Košice
Vittek 6'	Report	Diaby 31'; Bukata 74'

Stadium Myjava, Myjava
Attendance: 2,647
Referee: Miroslav Jaška

ŠK Slovan Bratislava	MFK Košice

SLOVAN BRATISLAVA:
GK	1	(Slovakia) Dušan Perniš
RB	18	(Ivory Coast) Mamadou Bagayoko
CB	16	(Argentina) Nicolas Ezequiel Gorosito
CB	3	(Slovakia) Branislav Niňaj
LB	21	(Slovakia) Kristián Kolčák	(substituted off) 79'
DM	5	(Slovakia) Tomáš Bagi
CM	20	(Guinea) Seydouba Soumah	(substituted off) 58'
RM	77	(Trinidad and Tobago) Lester Peltier	(substituted off) 85'
LM	11	(Serbia) Marko Milinković (yellow card) 50'
CF	9	(Slovakia) Juraj Halenár
FW	33	(Slovakia) Róbert Vittek (c)
Substitutions:
GK	22	(Slovakia) Martin Poláček
CB	26	(Slovakia) Dávid Hudák	(substituted on) 85'
MF	19	(Slovakia) Viktor Miklós
MF	23	(Slovakia) Lukáš Gašparovič
RM	7	(Slovakia) Filip Hlohovský
CF	12	(Slovakia) Karol Mészáros	(substituted on) 58'
FW	27	(Slovakia) Alan Kováč	(substituted on) 79'
Manager:
Dušan Galis

MFK KOŠICE:
GK	25	(North Macedonia) Darko Tofiloski
RB	19	(Slovakia) Miroslav Viazanko
CB	38	(Slovakia) Peter Bašista	(substituted off) 78'
CB	16	(Slovakia) Peter Kavka
LB	2	(Serbia) Boris Sekulić
DM	4	(Serbia) Ivan Ostojić
CM	10	(Slovakia) Peter Šinglár (c) (yellow card) 90'	(substituted off) 90'
CM	12	(Slovakia) Ľubomír Korijkov
AM	24	(Serbia) Lazar Đorđević	(substituted off) 80'
AM	28	(Slovakia) Martin Bukata
FW	11	(France) Oumar Diaby
Substitutions:
GK	1	(Slovakia) Matúš Ružinský
CB	5	(Slovakia) Tomáš Huk	(substituted on) 78'
RB	15	(Slovakia) Mikuláš Tóth
MF	6	(Slovakia) Jozef Skvašík
MF	18	(Slovakia) Lukáš Urban	(substituted on) 90'
AM	7	(Slovakia) Tomáš Kubík
FW	27	(Bosnia and Herzegovina) Nermin Haskić	(substituted on) 80'
Manager:
Radoslav Látal

Man of the Match:
Oumar Diaby (MFK Košice)

Assistant referees:
(Slovakia) Martin Balko
(Slovakia) Dušan Kubačka
Fourth official:
(Slovakia) Dušan Hrčka
Additional assistant referees:
(Slovakia) TBA
(Slovakia) TBA
