= 2014 Slovak Super Cup =

ŠK Slovan Bratislava	MFK Košice
1	0
- Date: 5 July 2014
- Venue: Štadión Pasienky, Bratislava
- Referee: Mário Vlk
- Attendance: 550

The 2014 Slovak Super Cup was a football match played by the 2013–14 Slovak First Football League champions ŠK Slovan Bratislava and the 2013–14 Slovak Cup winners MFK Košice on July 5, 2014. The match was played in Štadión Pasienky, Slovakia, and was won by Slovan Bratislava 1–0 to earn their fourth Super Cup.

The match was attended by 550 viewers. Referee was Mário Vlk, who was assisted by Dušan Hrčka and Branislav Hancko.

== Match details ==
5 July 2014
15:00 CEST

Slovan Bratislava	1–0	MFK Košice
Milinković 77'	Report

Pasienky, Bratislava
Attendance: 550
Referee: Mário Vlk

Slovan	Košice

Slovan:
GK	1	(Slovakia) Dušan Perniš
RB	14	(Czech Republic) Tomáš Jablonský
CB	3	(Slovakia) Branislav Niňaj
CB	26	(Slovakia) Dávid Hudák
LB	4	(Slovakia) Erik Čikoš
CM	8	(Slovakia) Erik Grendel		(substituted off) 61'
CM	81	(Slovakia) Richard Lásik
AM	10	(Slovakia) Igor Žofčák (c)		(substituted off) 61'
AM	20	(Guinea) Seydouba Soumah
AM	11	(Serbia) Marko Milinković		(substituted off) 82'
FW	6	(Czech Republic) Pavel Fořt
Substitutes:
MF	12	(Slovakia) Karol Mészáros		(substituted on) 82'
MF	77	(Trinidad and Tobago) Lester Peltier	(yellow card) 66'	(substituted on) 61'
FW	9	(Slovakia) Juraj Halenár		(substituted on) 61'
Manager:
(Czech Republic) František Straka

Košice:
GK	25	(North Macedonia) Darko Tofiloski
RB	2	(Serbia) Boris Sekulić	(yellow card) 35'
CB	38	(Slovakia) Peter Bašista
CB	16	(Slovakia) Peter Kavka
LB	19	(Slovakia) Miroslav Viazanko (c)	(yellow card) 54'	(substituted off) 82'
DM	4	(Serbia) Ivan Ostojić
CM	6	(Slovakia) Jozef Skvašík		(substituted off) 63'
CM	12	(Slovakia) Ľubomír Korijkov
RW	9	(Slovakia) Erik Pačinda	(yellow card) 42'	(substituted off) 77'
LW	28	(Slovakia) Martin Bukata
FW	24	(Serbia) Lazar Đorđević
Substitutes:
DF	5	(Slovakia) Tomáš Huk		(substituted on) 82'
MF	7	(Slovakia) Tomáš Kubík		(substituted on) 77'
MF	18	(Slovakia) Lukáš Urban		(substituted on) 63'
Manager:
(Czech Republic) Radoslav Látal
