= 2013–14 Slovak Cup =

2013–14 Slovak cup
Slovnaft cup

Tournament details
- Country: Slovakia
- Teams: 43

Final positions
- Champions: MFK Košice
- Runners-up: Slovan Bratislava

The 2013–14 Slovak Cup, also known as Slovnaft Cup for sponsorship reasons, was the 45th edition of the competition. 43 clubs participated in the tournament. The winners of the competition, qualify for the second qualifying round of the 2014–15 UEFA Europa League.

== First round ==
First round matches were played on 6 & 7 August 2013.

6 August 2013	Partizán Bardejov (2)	2–1	Odeva Lipany (3)	Bardejov
16:30	Berecký 42'; Palša 55'	Report	Pyda 45'	Stadium: Mestský štadión Bardejov; Attendance: 300; Referee: Michal Čiernik

6 August 2013	Spartak Vráble (3)	2–2 (4–3 p)	Senec (2)	Vráble
17:00	Kajaba 32'; Sojka 38'	Report	Jurkernik 52'; Bedecs 90+5'	Stadium: Futbalový štadión na Levickej ulici Attendance: 512; Referee: Adam Somoláni
	Penalties
	Gonda (penalty scored); Šlachta (penalty scored); Hamar (penalty missed); Petráš (penalty scored); Tužinský (penalty scored)		(penalty scored) Jurkemik; (penalty missed) Držík; (penalty scored) Bedecs; (penalty scored) Špilár; (penalty missed) Trajcsík

6 August 2013	Partizán Prečín (4)	1–2	Slovan Duslo Šaľa (2)	Prečín
17:00	Gajdosik 33'	Report	Mukalenga 45', 90+1'	Stadium: Štadión Prečín; Attendance: 200; Referee: Martin Ježík

6 August 2013	Kalinkovo (4)	w/o ^{1}	Šamorín (2)	Kalinkovo
17:00		Report		Stadium: Stadion Kalinkovo

6 August 2013	Baník Ružiná (3)	2–1	Fomat Martin (3)	Ružiná
17:00	Líška 52' (pen.); Gajdošík 59'	Report	Jadroň 69'	Stadium: Štadión Ružiná; Attendance: 105; Referee: Miroslav Fajčík

6 August 2013	Námestovo (3)	1–4	Zemplín Michalovce (2)	Námestovo
17:00	Hollý 36'	Report	Janič 20'; Kunca 56'; Morlacchi 62'; Danko 90'	Stadium: Štadión MŠK Námestovo; Attendance: 350; Referee: Peter Korista

6 August 2013	Rimavská Sobota (2)	3–1	Bodva Moldava nad Bodvou (3)	Rimavská Sobota
17:00	Kurak 42'; Rubint 71'; Köböl 88'	Report	Palencsár 86'	Stadium: Futbalový štadión na Záhradkách; Attendance: 200; Referee: Peter Vlčej

6 August 2013	Družstevník Vrakúň (4)	0–1	Sereď (3)	Vrakúň
17:00		Report	Morong 45'	Stadium: Štadión TJ Družstevnik Vrakúň; Attendance: 200; Referee: Peter Krivošík

6 August 2013	Vrbové (3)	0–0 (1–3 p)	Dunajská Lužná (3)	Vrbové
17:30		Report		Stadium: Športový Štadión Mésta Vrbové; Attendance: 150; Referee: Anton Jánoš

7 August 2013	Petržalka (3)	3–0	Rača (3)	Petržalka
17:00	Baláži 12'; Čunta 66'; Havrila 80'	Report		Stadium: Stadium FC Petržalka 1898; Attendance: 310; Referee: Pavol Piatka

7 August 2013	Nové Mesto nad Váhom (3)	1–1 (6–5 p)	Topvar Topoľčany (3)	Nové Mesto nad Váhom
17:00	Miklovič 63'	Report	Baláž 8' (pen.)	Stadium: Areál AFC Považan; Attendance: 300; Referee: Slavomír Cifrík
	Penalties
	Strelka (penalty scored); Balocký (penalty scored); Miklovič (penalty scored); Petrovský (penalty scored); Drahno (penalty scored); Šiko (penalty scored)		(penalty scored) Gajdoš; (penalty scored) Královič; (penalty scored) Kučera; (penalty scored) Baláž; (penalty scored) Badinský; (penalty missed) Král

7 August 2013	Haniska (4)	1–5	Šport Podbrezová (2)	Haniska
17:00	Gorej 35'	Report	Tubonemi 18'; Mózer 32', 38', 59'; Morháč 83'	Stadium: Štadión FK Haniska; Attendance: 600; Referee: Štefan Molitoris

7 August 2013	Dolný Kubín (3)	0–0 (3–1 p)	Snina (4)	Dolný Kubín
17:00		Report		Stadium: Stadium MUDr. Ivan Chodák; Attendance: 285; Referee: Jozef Kakaščík

7 August 2013	Čadca (4)	0–3	Tatran Prešov (2)	Čadca
17:00		Report	Katona 28'; Poliaček 32'; Papaj 33'	Stadium: Štadión FK Čadca; Attendance: 500; Referee: Michal Očenáš

7 August 2013	Milénium Bardejovská Nová Ves (3)	1–0	Lokomotíva Košice (3)	Bardejov
17:00	Pavúk 45'	Report		Stadium: Futbalový štadión Bardejovská Nová Ves; Attendance: 450; Referee: Peter Ziemba

7 August 2013	Vranov nad Topľou (3)	3–0	Futura Humenné (3)	Vranov nad Topľou
17:00	Streňo 70'; Dvorjak 82', 83'	Report		Stadium: Futbalový štadión MFK Vranov nad Topľou; Attendance: 250; Referee: Erik Anguš

7 August 2013	Baník Kalinovo (4)	0–0 (2–4 p)	Tatran Liptovský Mikuláš (2)	Kalinovo
17:00		Report		Stadium: Kalinovo Stadium; Attendance: 600; Referee: Roman Galád
	Penalties
	Paľaga (penalty scored); Püšpöky (penalty missed); Hazucha (penalty scored) 2:3; Melicher (penalty missed)		(penalty scored) Šupej; (penalty scored) Ferenc; (penalty scored) Mizerák; (penalty missed) Kucharčík; (penalty scored) Kubena

7 August 2013	Rovinka (4)	1–3	Pohronie (2)	Rovinka
17:30	Mužlay 49' (pen.)	Report	Páleník 17'; Krivjančin 83'; Zvara 87'	Stadium: Štadión TJ Rovinka; Attendance: 150; Referee: Tomáš Maršal

7 August 2013	Slovan Nemšová (3)	1–0	Nová Baňa (4)	Nemšová
17:30	Opatovský 86'	Report		Stadium: Štadión Nemšová; Attendance: 200; Referee: Martin Dohál

7 August 2013	Dubnica (2)	1–3	Skalica (3)	Dubnica nad Váhom
17:30	Púpala 25'	Report	Švrček 23'; Šebesta 67', 85'	Stadium: Mestský štadión Attendance: 175; Referee: Rastislav Jurenka

- ^{1} Kalinkovo forfeited meaning that Šamorín progress to the next round.

== Second round ==
Second round matches were played on 27 & 28 August 2013.

27 August 2013	Spartak Vráble (3)	0–0 (3–4 p)	Senica (1)	Vráble
17:00		Report		Stadium: Futbalový štadión na Levickej ulici Attendance: 650; Referee: Rastislav Jurenka
	Penalties
	Husár (penalty scored); Šlachta (penalty missed); Kajaba (penalty scored); Fekiač (penalty scored); Oskar Straka (penalty missed)		(penalty scored) Piroska; (penalty missed) Brabec; (penalty scored) Zeman; (penalty scored) Jirásek; (penalty scored) Hiago

27 August 2013	Sereď (3)	0–0 (4–3 p)	Trenčín (1)	Sereď
17:00		Report		Stadium: Stadium Sereď; Attendance: 700; Referee: Gabriel Michlian
	Penalties
	Železník (penalty scored); Hulák (penalty scored); Tarek[[]] (penalty missed); Kasaj (penalty scored); Gál (penalty scored)		(penalty scored) Malec; (penalty missed) Štefánik; (penalty scored) Rundić; (penalty scored) Holúbek; (penalty missed) William

27 August 2013	Dunajská Lužná (3)	0–0 (4–3 p)	Nitra (1)	Dunajská Lužná
17:00		Report		Stadium: Stadium Dunajská Lužná; Attendance: 450; Referee: Ladislav Prešinský
	Penalties
	Jackuliak (penalty scored); Hrnčár (penalty missed); Chromý (penalty scored); Brunovský (penalty missed); Puchner (penalty scored); Nosko (penalty scored)		(penalty scored) Cléber; (penalty missed) Kaspřák; (penalty scored) Paukner; (penalty missed) Le Giang; (penalty scored) Boszorád; (penalty missed) Barroso

27 August 2013	Slovan Duslo Šaľa (2)	2–1	Šamorín (2)	Šaľa
17:00	Mukalenga 21'; Čirik 24'	Report	Kliment 13'	Stadium: Šaľa Stadium; Attendance: 225; Referee: Michal Perašín

27 August 2013	Dolný Kubín (3)	0–2	Žilina (1)	Dolný Kubín
17:00		Report	Bumbera 14' (o.g.); Vavro 61'	Stadium: Stadium MUDr. Ivan Chodák; Attendance: 1,325; Referee: Anton Ihring

27 August 2013	Šport Podbrezová (2)	0–3	Ružomberok (1)	Podbrezová
17:00		Report	Adamović 50'; Bartoš 79'; Tawamba 83'	Stadium: Stadium Kolkáreň; Attendance: 1,150; Referee: Peter Kráľovič

27 August 2013	Tatran Prešov (2)	0–0 (3–2 p)	Partizán Bardejov (2)	Prešov
17:00		Report		Stadium: Tatran Stadium; Attendance: 686; Referee: Dušan Sedlák
	Penalties
	Petráš (penalty scored); Poliaček (penalty missed); Hruška (penalty missed); Jacko (penalty scored); Dolný (penalty scored)		(penalty missed) Zápotoka; (penalty missed) Dyjan; (penalty scored) Palša; (penalty scored) Dzurík; (penalty missed) Andrić

27 August 2013	Dukla Banská Bystrica (1)	0–0 (3–4 p)	Tatran Liptovský Mikuláš (2)	Banská Bystrica
17:30		Report		Stadium: Štadión SNP Štiavničky; Attendance: 1,504; Referee: Roland Weiss
	Penalties
	Faško (penalty scored); Podstavek (penalty missed); Teixeira (penalty scored); Slančík (penalty scored); Jurčo (penalty missed)		(penalty scored) Šupej; (penalty scored) Kucharčík; (penalty scored) Hoferica; (penalty scored) Latiak; (penalty missed) Jurky

28 August 2013	Slovan Nemšová (3)	1–0	Spartak Myjava (1)	Nemšová
16:30	Laco 55'	Report		Stadium: Štadión Nemšová; Attendance: 400; Referee: Adam Somoláni

28 August 2013	DAC Dunajská Streda (1)	6–1	Pohronie (2)	Dunajská Streda
17:00	Matúš 16'; Gašparík 33'; Majerník 37'; Antunovič 52'; Szarka 62'; Mesanović 82'	Report	Bobor 23'	Stadium: DAC Stadion; Attendance: 318; Referee: Marek Mastiš

28 August 2013	Nové Mesto nad Váhom (3)	0–5	Slovan Bratislava (1)	Nové Mesto nad Váhom
17:00		Report	Žofčák 37'; Fořt 49', 56'; Mészáros 66'; Hlohovský 88'	Stadium: Areál AFC Považan; Attendance: 540; Referee: Róbert Mojsej

28 August 2013	Petržalka (3)	2–4	ViOn Zlaté Moravce (1)	Petržalka
17:00	Vuković 14'; Kolony 68'	Report	Pribula 26', 74'; Orávik 76', 86'	Stadium: Stadium FC Petržalka 1898; Attendance: 390; Referee: Anton Jánoš

28 August 2013	Spartak Trnava (1)	2–0	Skalica (3)	Trnava
17:00	Hodek 62'; Sabo 65'	Report		Stadium: Štadión Antona Malatinského; Attendance: 1,510; Referee: Martin Ježík

28 August 2013	Baník Ružiná (3)	1–3	Košice (1)	Ružiná
17:00	Gajdošík 83'	Report	Viazanko 19', 36'; Pačinda 33' (pen.)	Stadium: Štadión Ružiná; Attendance: 500; Referee: Miroslav Jaška

28 August 2013	Vranov nad Topľou (3)	0–2	Zemplín Michalovce (2)	Vranov nad Topľou
17:00		Report	Regáli 30'; Kovaľ 90'	Stadium: Futbalový štadión MFK Vranov nad Topľou; Attendance: 650; Referee: Peter Vlčej

28 August 2013	Milénium Bardejovská Nová Ves (3)	0–1	Rimavská Sobota (2)	Bardejov
17:00		Report	Kostúrik 65'	Stadium: Futbalový štadión Bardejovská Nová Ves; Attendance: 350; Referee: Štefan Leško

== Third round ==
Third round matches were played on 24 & 25 September 2013.

24 September 2013	Sereď (3)	1–1 (a.e.t.) (2–3 p)	Košice (1)	Sereď
16:00	Scherhaufer 87'	Report	Hovančík 63'	Stadium: Štadión Sereď; Attendance: 846; Referee: Patrik Hrčka
	Penalties
	Hulák (penalty missed); Loduha (penalty scored); Varhaník (penalty scored); Sukisa (penalty missed); Hudec (penalty missed)		(penalty scored) Šinglár; (penalty scored) Sekulić; (penalty missed) Bukata; (penalty scored) Ostojić

24 September 2013	Tatran Prešov (2)	1–0	DAC Dunajská Streda (1)	Prešov
16:00	Poliaček 80'	Report		Stadium: Štadión 1. FC Tatran Prešov; Attendance: 613; Referee: Kamil Horváth

24 September 2013	Zlaté Moravce (1)	3–2	Slovan Duslo Šaľa (2)	Zlaté Moravce
16:00	Pribula 24', 42'; Orávik 58'	Report	Numeric 71'; Konopásek 81'	Stadium: Štadión FC ViOn; Attendance: 560; Referee: Richard Trutz

24 September 2013	Spartak Trnava (1)	3–0	Tatran Liptovský Mikuláš (2)	Trnava
16:00	Procházka 2'; Augustini 29'; Poznar 61'	Report		Stadium: Štadión Antona Malatinského; Attendance: 915; Referee: Michal Smolák

24 September 2013	Rimavská Sobota (2)	1–1 (a.e.t.) (5–6 p)	Senica (1)	Rimavská Sobota
16:00	Zvara 85'	Report	Tsoumou 33'	Stadium: Na Zahradkach Stadium; Attendance: 588; Referee: Dušan Sedlák
	Penalties
	Sivčevič (penalty missed); Kostúrik (penalty scored); Migaľa (penalty scored); Kurák (penalty scored); Kostolanský (penalty scored); Zvara (penalty missed); Nilaš (penalty scored); Gálik (penalty missed)		(penalty scored) Piroska; (penalty missed) Križko; (penalty scored) Hiago; (penalty scored) Kóňa; (penalty scored) Opiela; (penalty missed) Kalabiška; (penalty scored) Brabec; (penalty scored) Diviš

24 September 2013	Ružomberok (1)	0–0 (a.e.t.) (5–4 p)	Zemplín Michalovce (2)	Ružomberok
16:30		Report		Stadium: Štadión MFK Ružomberok; Attendance: 1,212; Referee: Vladimír Hracho
	Penalties
	Ďubek (penalty scored); Zreľák (penalty scored); Lovás (penalty scored); Adamović (penalty scored); Nagy (penalty scored)		(penalty scored) Janočko; (penalty scored) Hamuľák; (penalty scored) Kunca; (penalty scored) Kovaľ; (penalty missed) Božok

25 September 2013	Dunajská Lužná (3)	0–3	Slovan Bratislava (1)	Dunajská Lužná
16:00		Report	Hlohovský 5'; Fořt 82'; Vittek 83'	Stadium: Štadión OFK Dunajská Lužná; Attendance: 950; Referee: Jozef Pavlík

25 September 2013	Slovan Nemšová (3)	0–1	Žilina (1)	Nemšová
16:00		Report	Pich 28'	Stadium: Štadión Nemšová; Attendance: 550; Referee: Rastislav Jurenka

== Quarter-finals ==
Quarterfinals matches were played on 22 & 23 October 2013 (first legs) and 5 & 6 November 2013 (second legs).

=== First legs ===
22 October 2013	Spartak Trnava (1)	1–3	Ružomberok (1)	Trnava
15:00	Sabo 13'	Report	Zošák 37'; Lačný 82', 89'	Stadium: Štadión Antona Malatinského; Attendance: 1,256; Referee: Jozef Pavlík

22 October 2013	Tatran Prešov (2)	1–2	Košice (1)	Prešov
16:30	Dolný 61' (pen.)	Report	Diaby 10', 74'	Stadium: Štadión 1. FC Tatran Prešov; Attendance: 1,276; Referee: Kamil Horváth

22 October 2013	Žilina (1)	1–3	Slovan Bratislava (1)	Žilina
17:30	Majtán 88'	Report	Kolčák 10'; Mészáros 32'; Peltier 38'	Stadium: Štadión pod Dubňom; Attendance: 2,369; Referee: Martin Ježík

23 October 2013	Senica (1)	1–2 †	Zlaté Moravce (1)	Senica
17:30	Diarrassouba 70'	Report	Mazan 31'; Szabo 60'	Stadium: Štadión FK Senica; Attendance: 822; Referee: Miroslav Jaška

- † Senica were awarded a 3–0 win over Zlaté Moravce. The match originally finished with a 2–1 win for Zlaté Moravce.

=== Second legs ===
5 November 2013	Ružomberok (1)	1–2 (4–3 agg.)	Spartak Trnava (1)	Ružomberok
16:30	Zošák 10'	Report	Banovič 74'; Sabo 90+4' (pen.)	Stadium: Štadión MFK Ružomberok; Attendance: 1,812; Referee: Miroslav Fajčík

5 November 2013	Zlaté Moravce (1)	0–1 (0–4 agg.)	Senica (1)	Zlaté Moravce
16:30		Report	Ventúra 90+2'	Stadium: Štadión FC ViOn; Attendance: 500; Referee: Gabriel Michlian

6 November 2013	Košice (1)	2–0 (4–1 agg.)	Tatran Prešov (2)	Košice
16:00	Novák 83', 86'	Report		Stadium: Lokomotíva Stadium; Attendance: 2,200; Referee: Pavol Chmura

6 November 2013	Slovan Bratislava (1)	2–0 (5–1 agg.)	Žilina (1)	Bratislava
18:00	Grendel 87'; Vittek 90'	Report		Stadium: Štadión Pasienky; Attendance: 420; Referee: Dušan Sedlák

== Semi-finals ==
Semifinals matches were played on 8 April 2014 (first legs) and 15 April 2014 (second legs).

=== First legs ===
8 April 2014	Ružomberok (1)	0–0	Košice (1)	Ružomberok
16:30		Report		Stadium: Štadión MFK Ružomberok; Attendance: 1,513; Referee: Ivan Kružliak

8 April 2014	Senica (1)	1–3	Slovan Bratislava (1)	Senica
16:30	Piroska 31' (pen.)	Report	Vittek 13'; Peltier 18'; Soumah 61'	Stadium: Štadión FK Senica; Attendance: 1,324; Referee: Vladimír Vnuk

=== Second legs ===
15 April 2014	Slovan Bratislava (1)	3–0 (6–1 agg.)	Senica (1)	Bratislava
13:00	Halenár 4'; Gorosito 44'; Milinković 75'	Report		Stadium: Štadión Pasienky; Attendance: 3,565; Referee: Ľubomír Samotný

15 April 2014	Košice (1)	4−1 (4−1 agg.)	Ružomberok (1)	Košice
16:30	Diaby 56'; Novák 73', 84'; Bašista 78'	Report	Lovas 55'	Stadium: Lokomotíva Stadium; Attendance: 2,080; Referee: Mário Vlk

== Final ==
1 May 2014
18:20 CEST

Slovan Bratislava	1–2	Košice
Vittek 6'	Report	Diaby 31'; Bukata 74'

Stadium Myjava, Myjava
Attendance: 2,647
Referee: Miroslav Jaška
