= 2009 Slovak Super Cup =

Slovan Bratislava	MFK Košice
2	0
- Date: 5 July 2009
- Venue: Štadión MFK Dolný Kubín, Dolný Kubín
- Referee: Ján Valášek
- Attendance: 1,400

The 2009 Slovak Super Cup was a football match played on July 5, 2009, in Dolný Kubín, Slovakia.

The match was played between 2008–09 Slovak Superliga champions ŠK Slovan Bratislava and the 2008–09 Slovak Cup winners MFK Košice, and was won by Slovan Bratislava 2–0 to earn their third Super Cup.

The match was attended by 1,400 viewers. Referee was Ján Valášek, who was assisted by Kubačka and Chládek.

== Match details ==
5 July 2009
17:00 CEST

Slovan Bratislava	2–0	MFK Košice
Masaryk 36', 65'	Report

Štadión MFK Dolný Kubín, Dolný Kubín
Attendance: 1,400
Referee: Ján Valášek

Slovan	Košice

Slovan (4-4-2):
GK	35	(Czech Republic) David Bičík
RB	6	(Slovakia) Martin Dobrotka
CB	2	(Slovakia) Kornel Saláta
CB	29	(Czech Republic) Radek Dosoudil
LB	19	(Slovakia) Peter Petráš	(yellow card) 18'
RM	12	(Slovakia) Branislav Obžera	(yellow card) 60'	(substituted off) 81'
CM	11	(Bosnia and Herzegovina) Mario Božić		(substituted off) 88'
CM	24	(Slovakia) Ján Kozák
LM	10	(Slovakia) Samuel Slovák (c)
FW	20	(Slovakia) Pavol Masaryk		(substituted off) 90+'
FW	9	(Slovakia) Juraj Halenár
Substitutes:
MF	8	(Slovakia) Peter Černák		(substituted in) 88'
FW	17	(Slovakia) Jakub Sylvestr		(substituted in) 81'
FW	25	(Brazil) Gaúcho		(substituted in) 90+'
Manager:
(Czech Republic) Dušan Uhrin

Košice (4-2-3-1):
GK	25	(Slovakia) Jozef Brudňak
RB	2	(Slovakia) Stanislav Kišš	(yellow card) 28'
CB	23	(Slovakia) Peter Bašista (c)	(yellow card) 33'
CB	13	(Slovakia) Róbert Cicman
LB	11	(Slovakia) Martin Juhar
DM	7	(Slovakia) Kamil Kuzma
DM	8	(Slovakia) Timon Dobias
AM	14	(Slovakia) Miroslav Viazanko
AM	19	(Serbia) Marko Milinković		(substituted off) 54'
AM	18	(Slovakia) Ján Novák	(yellow card) 51'
FW	26	(Slovakia) Dávid Škutka
Substitutes:
MF	17	(Slovakia) Lukáš Janič		(substituted in) 54'
Manager:
(Slovakia) Ján Kozák
