= František Hanc =

Slovak footballer (born 1974)

Personal information
- Full name: František Hanc
- Date of birth: 2 April 1974 (age 52)
- Place of birth: Snina, Prešov Region, Czechoslovakia
- Height: 1.96 m (6 ft 5 in)
- Position: Defender

Youth career
- ?–1993: Snina

Senior career*
Years	Team	Apps	(Gls)
1993–1999	Chemlon Humenné		
1999–2001	MFK Košice		
2002	Karpaty Lviv	10	(0)
2002	→ Karpaty-2 Lviv	3	(0)
2002	Borysfen Boryspil	1	(0)
2002–2003	Arsenal Kyiv	0	(0)
2003–2004	Artmedia Petržalka		
2004–2005	SV Mattersburg	9	(0)
2005–2009	HFC Humenné		
2009–2011	MFK Snina		

Managerial career
- 2011–2013: MFK Snina
- * Club domestic league appearances and goals

František Hanc (born 2 April 1974, in Prešov) is a Slovak football player.
