= Erik Čikoš =

Slovak footballer

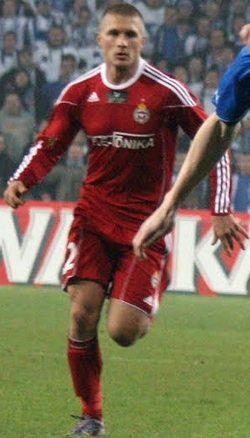

Personal information
- Full name: Erik Čikoš
- Date of birth: 31 July 1988 (age 38)
- Place of birth: Bratislava, Czechoslovakia
- Height: 1.80 m (5 ft 11 in)
- Position: Right back

Team information
- Current team: USV Intersport Winninger Ferschnitz

Youth career
- Inter Bratislava

Senior career*
Years	Team	Apps	(Gls)
2005–2008	Inter Bratislava	60	(2)
2009–2010	Petržalka	33	(3)
2010–2011	→ Wisła Kraków (loan)	27	(0)
2011–2015	Slovan Bratislava	55	(1)
2014	→ Ross County (loan)	14	(0)
2016–2017	Ross County	5	(0)
2017	Monopoli	2	(0)
2017	Senica	2	(0)
2017–2018	Slovan Bratislava	14	(0)
2018–2019	Debrecen	6	(0)
2019	Slovan Bratislava B	7	(0)
2020–2022	Puszcza Niepołomice	61	(8)
2022–2023	USC Pöggstall		
2023–2024	SV Wimpassing		
2025–	FK Dubravka		

International career
2006	Slovakia U18	2	(0)
2006–2007	Slovakia U19	13	(0)
2007–2009	Slovakia U20	5	(1)
2008–2010	Slovakia U21	17	(0)
2014	Slovakia	2	(0)
- * Club domestic league appearances and goals as of 09:20, 31 July 2024 (UTC)

Erik Čikoš (born 31 July 1988) is a Slovak professional footballer who plays as a right back for Austrian club USV Intersport Winninger Ferschnitz.

== Career ==
Čikoš first club was Inter Bratislava, where he played till 2008. In 2009, he transferred to Petržalka.

=== Wisła Kraków ===
In July 2010, Čikoš came to Ekstraklasa side Wisła Kraków for medical tests and then he joined Wisła on one-year loan deal, with a one-year option. Čikoš was a replacement for Pablo Álvarez Menéndez, another right-back player, who left the club to make a return to Reggina. Čikoš was unveiled at the Stadion Miejski, where he was given number 22 shirt.

Čikoš made his league debut for the club, in the opening game of the season, in a 1–0 victory over Arka Gdynia. Under the management of Robert Maaskant, Čikoš was used in the right-back position and plays an important role in the defensive strength of the team, where the club would win the Ekstraklasa and Čikoš went on to make 27 appearances. In April 2011, the move could be set, where he could sign a permanent basis with the club, which gave a contract until 2013, though the decision hasn't been done.

At the end of the 2010–11 season, it announced that Čikoš left the club after Wisła Kraków refused to take up the options to sign Čikoš the previous month.

=== Slovan Bratislava ===
After leaving Wisła Kraków, Čikoš returned to Slovakia by joining Slovan Bratislava. Čikoš made his debut for the club, in the return leg of second round Champions League, as Slovan Bratislava beat Tobol on away goal after the match ended with a 1–1 draw on 19 July 2011. Despite elimination from Champions League after losing to Cypriot side APOEL, Čikoš played in both legs in the qualification round of Europa League, as they beat Italian side AS Roma 2–1 on aggregate. After making eight starts, Čikoš was out of the squad when Čikoš was injured with a knee ligament when that happened during a match and missed the 2011–12 season, though he made a brief return in March 2012. Once again, Čikoš sustained another injury when he tore his meniscus. While on the sideline, Čikoš says he went under a knife as a result of his knee ligament injury.

In the 2012–13 season, Čikoš remained on the sideline until he return to training in January. Despite being recovered, Čikoš's return was short-lived, when he injured his knee during a friendly match against Red Star Belgrade. Unlike his injuries he sustained recently, this wasn't a serious injury and will only be out for two to three weeks. Though recovered from injuries, Čikoš had to wait until 19 May 2013, where he made his first appearance for the club in years, as Slovan Bratislava would lose 1–0 to Zlaté Moravce.

After the end of his loan spell at Ross County, Čikoš returned to Slovan Bratislava and made a great start on his return when he scored in the second round of first leg of Champions League, as Slovan Bratislava beat Welsh side The New Saints 1–0 and Slovan Bratislava would go through to the next round after another win in the return leg.

=== Ross County ===
On 31 January 2014, Čikoš signed for Ross County on loan until the end of the 2013–14 season. On making the move, Čikoš revealed that his compatriot team-mate Filip Kiss played a role in persuading him to join Ross County. Čikoš made his debut for the club, playing at right-back, as Ross County drew 2–2 with Kilmarnock. While playing at Ross County, Čikoš said that the Scottish league had a higher tempo than in the Slovak Super Liga, he also said that he enjoyed living in the local area, which he described as having a "nice atmosphere." He went on to make 14 appearances for the club.

In May 2016, Čikoš signed again for Ross County, this time on a permanent contract. On 17 January 2017, Ross County announced that Čikoš had left the club, his contract having been terminated by mutual consent.

== International career ==
After being included in top Slovak levels, Čikoš was finally called up by the senior national football team for two games. He made his national team debut against Montenegro on 23 May 2014, which Slovakia would earn a 2–0 victory. Čikoš was previously called up by Vladimír Weiss in May 2011, but didn't play.

== Honours ==
Wisła Kraków

- Ekstraklasa: 2010–11

Slovan Bratislava

- Slovak First Football League: 2012–13
- Slovak Cup: 2017–18
- Slovak Super Cup: 2014
