= Gábor Straka =

Hungarian-Slovak footballer

Personal information
- Full name: Gábor Straka
- Date of birth: 18 December 1981 (age 44)
- Place of birth: Dunajská Streda, Slovakia
- Height: 1.80 m (5 ft 11 in)
- Position: Midfielder

Youth career
- Dunajská Streda

Senior career*
| Years | Team | Apps | (Gls) |
| 2000–2006 | Dunajská Streda | 96 | (4) |
| 2003–2004 | → Petržalka (loan) | 24 | (0) |
| 2006–2008 | Petržalka | 40 | (3) |
| 2008–2013 | Ruch Chorzów | 82 | (3) |
| 2013 | Družstevník Vrakúň | 7 | (1) |
| 2014–2016 | Dunajská Streda | 51 | (0) |
| Total | | 300 | (11) |
- * Club domestic league appearances and goals

Gábor Straka (born 18 December 1981) is a Hungarian-Slovak former professional footballer who played as a midfielder.
