= Dušan Perniš =

Slovak footballer

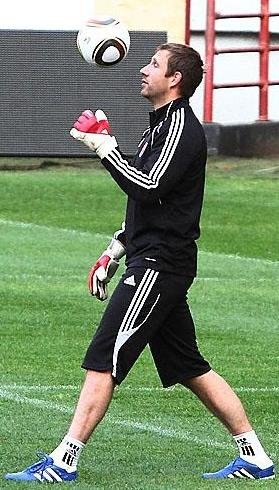
- Perniš in 2010

Personal information
- Date of birth: 28 November 1984 (age 41)
- Place of birth: Nitra, Czechoslovakia
- Height: 1.91 m (6 ft 3 in)
- Position: Goalkeeper

Youth career
- Nitra

Senior career*
| Years | Team | Apps | (Gls) |
| 2002–2005 | Dubnica | 61 | (0) |
| 2005–2009 | Žilina | 46 | (0) |
| 2006 | → Senec (loan) | 22 | (0) |
| 2006–2008 | → Dubnica nad Váhom (loan) | 43 | (0) |
| 2010–2012 | Dundee United | 81 | (0) |
| 2012–2013 | Pogoń Szczecin | 12 | (0) |
| 2012 | Pogoń Szczecin II | 3 | (0) |
| 2013–2015 | Slovan Bratislava | 33 | (0) |
| 2013 | → Nitra (loan) | 10 | (0) |
| 2015–2016 | Iraklis | 13 | (0) |
| 2017–2021 | Beroe Stara Zagora | 111 | (0) |
| 2021–2025 | Dubnica nad Váhom | 0 | (0) |

International career
| 2004–2013 | Slovakia | 7 | (0) |
- * Club domestic league appearances and goals as of 28 November 2023

Dušan Perniš (born 28 November 1984) is a Slovak former professional footballer who played as a goalkeeper. He serves as the goalkeeping coach of MŠK Považská Bystrica.

Perniš has been capped for Slovakia at senior level.

== Club career ==
Perniš began his football career at FC Nitra, before moving to Dubnica at the age of eighteen. At first, he spent most of his time on the bench, but in a few seasons, Perniš soon became the first-choice goalkeeper. In the 2004–05 season, Perniš made thirty two appearances and the club finished in fourth place, which also earned them a place in Europe. Following two wins against Hungarian side Vasas and Turkish side Ankaraspor, the club faced English side Newcastle United. Perniš was in goal for match, but Newcastle United proved to be too strong and Dubnica failed to win either leg, losing 3–1 and 2–0.

In the January transfer window, Perniš joined MŠK Žilina. At Žilina, he soon faced a fight for the first choice with Dušan Kuciak, but lost. The next season, Perniš left for Senec on loan and stayed there for four months, making 22 appearances, before returning to his parent club. At the end of the 2006–07 season, Žilina won the league. After his first loan spell, Perniš returned to Dubnica on temporary basis, and spent 18 months there. During his return, Perniš made 43 appearances.

Upon his return from Dubnica, Perniš established himself in the first team, following the sale of Kuciak to Vaslui, and made 32 appearances. During this spell, Perniš played in all of the club's matches in European competitions, including a 2–1 win over Aston Villa in the last group-stage match. At the end of the season, the club finished in second place. After that, Perniš was the club's first choice goalkeeper until he left the club. During his time at Žilina, Perniš earned a nickname of Perník, translating to 'gingerbread' in English.

=== Dundee United ===
After signing a pre-contract deal in July 2009 to join Dundee United in January 2010, Dušan made his debut in January 2010 in a 2–0 Scottish Cup win against Partick Thistle, also keeping a clean sheet on his league debut four days later. Perniš kissed silver for the first time on 15 May 2010, when he kept a clean sheet in the Scottish cup final, when Dundee United beat Ross County.

The next season, he was in goal when Dundee lost and drew (1–2 on agg.) against Greek side AEK Athens. In his first full season at Dundee, Perniš was in the club's squad, playing in goal entirely; which also happened again the following season.

On 9 February 2012, it announced that Dundee United announced the signing of Polish goalkeeper Radosław Cierzniak on a pre-contract agreement and confirmed Pernis would be leaving in the summer when his contract expired. Since becoming a free agent, Perniš announced his intention to stay in the UK, insisting his family have settled down. Perniš turned down a move to SPL's rival Hibernian, insisting he want to move to England; Perniš also turned a move back to his homeland, Senica.

After deciding to play for an English club, Perniš went on a trial with Championship side Leicester City

=== Pogoń Szczecin ===
Perniš joined newly promoted Polish side Pogoń Szczecin on 2 August 2012, on a one-year deal. Aberdeen manager Derek McInnes had expressed interest in the goalkeeper as well. However, Perniš failed to establish himself as a first-choice goalkeeper at Pogoń. He left the club in June 2013 after his contract expired. Although Perniš went on trials with Danish club Viborg FF, he eventually joined the Corgoň Liga reigning champions ŠK Slovan Bratislava.

=== Slovan Bratislava ===
After signing his contract with Slovan in September 2013, Perniš was sent on loan to fellow league side FC Nitra, where he spent the autumn part of the 2013–14 season. The goalkeeper returned from loan in the winter break.

=== Iraklis ===
On 18 July 2015, Perniš signed a two-year contract with Super League Greece club Iraklis.

=== Beroe Stara Zagora ===
On 27 January 2017, Perniš joined Bulgarian club Beroe Stara Zagora.

== International career ==
Perniš was an unused substitute for Slovakia during the 2003 FIFA World Youth Championship.

Perniš made his debut against Thailand in the final game of the 2004 King's Cup in Bangkok, Thailand, when he played the entire 90 minutes of the game, conceding one goal in the 13th minute by Sakda Joemdee from a penalty kick. The match ended in a 1–1 tie and Slovakia went on to win the competition after defeating the home side 5–4 in the penalty shootout, giving Perniš a lot of the credit for the win.

On 12 August 2009, Perniš returned to Slovakia's squad for a 1–1 friendly away draw against Iceland, coming on as a substitute for Ján Mucha at half-time. Later, he became a regularly benched substitute in the UEFA Euro 2012 qualifying and the 2014 FIFA World Cup qualification, yet Ján Mucha was given a priority. Slovakia failed to qualify for either of the tournaments.

== Honours ==
Dundee United

- Scottish Cup: 2009–10

Slovan Bratislava

- Slovak First Football League: 2013–14
- Slovak Super Cup: 2014
