= Mário Kurák =

Slovak footballer

Personal information
- Full name: Mário Kurák
- Date of birth: 30 November 1983 (age 42)
- Place of birth: Czechoslovakia
- Position: Midfielder

Team information
- Current team: FK Poprad

Youth career
- –2004: TJ Sklotatran Poltár
- 2001: → Rimavská Sobota (loan)
- 2001–2002: FC Junior Radvaň

Senior career*
Years	Team	Apps	(Gls)
2002–2004	ŽP Šport Podbrezová		
2004	TJ Družstevník Hrnčiarska Ves		
2004	→ MŠO Štúrovo (loan)		
2005–2008	Zenit Čáslav		
–	Mladá Boleslav		
2008–2013	Baník Ružiná		
2013	Kaposvár		
2013	Rimavská Sobota	18	(6)
2014	Salgótarjáni		
2014	Tatran Liptovský Mikuláš		
2015−2016	TJ Jednota Málinec		
2015	→ Tatran Liptovský Mikuláš (loan)	33	(11)
2015	→ Skalica (loan)	15	(3)
2016	→ Dukla Banská Bystrica (loan)	11	(6)
2016–	Poprad	0	(0)
- * Club domestic league appearances and goals as of 28 May 2016

Mário Kurák (born 30 November 1983) is a professional Slovak footballer who currently plays for Slovak Second Football League club FK Poprad as a midfielder.

== Club career ==
=== MFK Skalica ===
He made his professional Fortuna Liga debut for MFK Skalica against MFK Ružomberok on 18 July 2015.
