= Tomáš Huk =

Slovak footballer

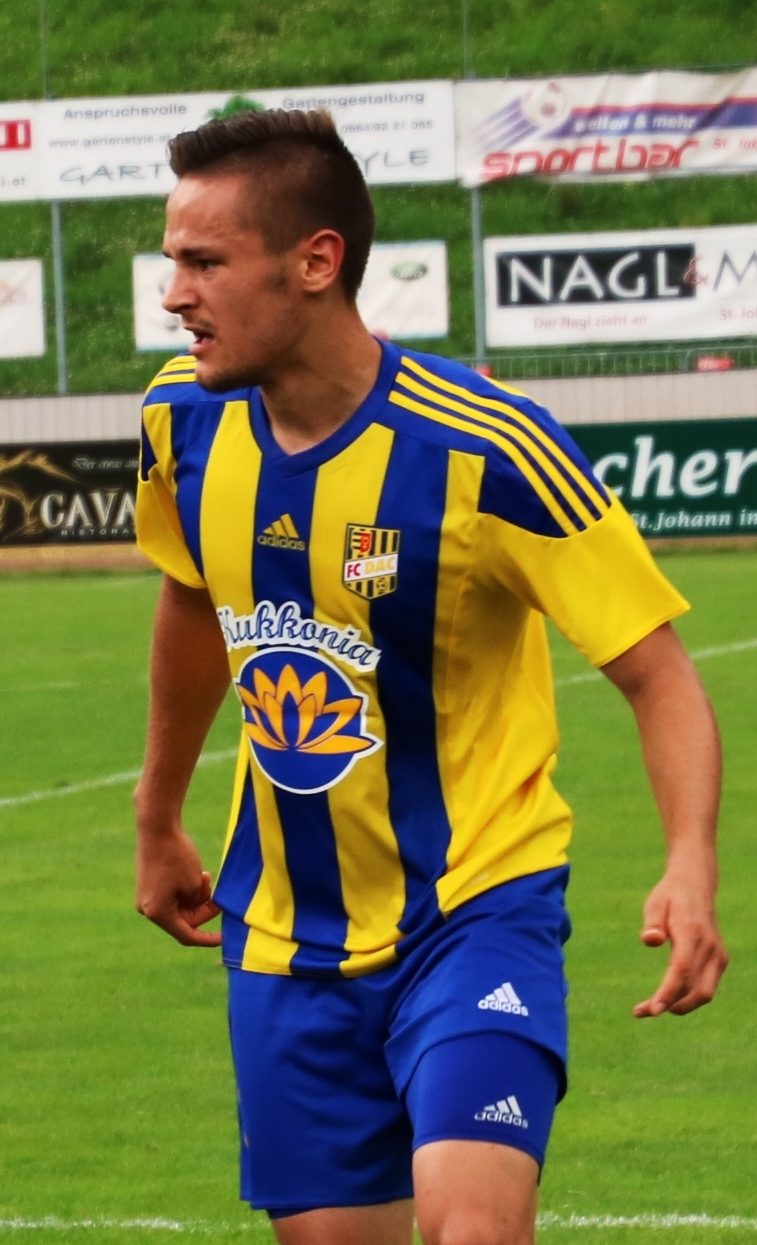
- Tomáš Huk with Dunajská Streda in 2017

Personal information
- Full name: Tomáš Huk
- Date of birth: 22 December 1994 (age 31)
- Place of birth: Košice, Slovakia
- Height: 1.84 m (6 ft 0 in)
- Position: Centre-back

Team information
- Current team: Slovácko (on loan from Sigma Olomouc)
- Number: 22

Youth career
- KAC Jednota Košice
- 2005–2014: Košice

Senior career*
Years	Team	Apps	(Gls)
2012–2016	Košice	51	(3)
2016–2019	DAC Dunajská Streda	103	(2)
2019–2025	Piast Gliwice	116	(7)
2025–	Sigma Olomouc	11	(0)
2026–	→ Slovácko (loan)	6	(0)

International career
2010–2011	Slovakia U17	2	(0)
2012–2013	Slovakia U19	1	(0)
2015–2017	Slovakia U21	1	(0)
2017	Slovakia	2	(0)
- * Club domestic league appearances and goals as of 25 May 2026

Tomáš Huk (born 22 December 1994) is a Slovak professional footballer who plays as a centre-back for Czech First League club Slovácko o loan from Sigma Olomouc.

== Club career ==
=== MFK Košice ===
He made his debut for Košice under future national team coach Ján Kozák, on 3 November 2012, in a 0–0 away Corgoň Liga draw against AS Trenčín, coming on as a 52nd minute replacement for Peter Šinglár.

=== DAC Dunajská Streda ===
On 6 February 2016, he signed a three-and-a-half-year contract with DAC Dunajská Streda.

=== SK Sigma Olomouc ===
On 16 June 2025, Huk signed a two-year contract with Czech First League club Sigma Olomouc.

==== Loan to Slovácko ====
On 12 February 2026, Huk joined Slovácko on a half-year loan deal.

== International career ==
Huk was first called up to the senior national team for two unofficial friendly fixtures held in Abu Dhabi, UAE, in January 2017, against Uganda and Sweden, by his former coach from MFK Košice - Ján Kozák, who coached him in 2012. He capped his debut against Uganda, being fielded since the 70th minute, when he substituted Martin Bukata. Slovakia went on to lose the game 1–3. Huk also played the full length of a 0–6 loss to Sweden.

== Career statistics ==
=== International ===
Appearances and goals by national team and year
National team	Year	Apps	Goals
Slovakia
Slovakia	2017	2	0
Total		2	0

== Honours ==
Košice

- Slovak Cup: 2013–14
