= Martin Jurkemik =

Slovak footballer

Personal information
- Full name: Martin Jurkemik
- Date of birth: 14 November 1989 (age 36)
- Place of birth: Bratislava, Czechoslovakia
- Height: 1.81 m (5 ft 11 1/2 in)
- Position: Full back

Team information
- Current team: ŠK SFM Senec
- Number: 6

Youth career
- 1996–2006: Inter Bratislava
- 2006–2008: Sparta Prague
- 2008–2010: FC Zürich

Senior career*
Years	Team	Apps	(Gls)
2010–2011	Šaľa	21	(0)
2011–2013	Ružomberok	23	(0)
2013–	Senec	7	(0)
- * Club domestic league appearances and goals as of 31 August 2013

Martin Jurkemik (born 14 November 1989 in Bratislava) is a Slovak football defender who last played for Slovak 2. liga club ŠK SFM Senec.

== MFK Ružomberok ==
In summer 2011, he joined Slovak club MFK Ružomberok on a two-year contract. He made his debut for MFK Ružomberok against FC Spartak Trnava on 30 April 2011.
