= Peter Kostolanský =

Slovak footballer

Personal information
- Full name: Peter Kostolanský
- Date of birth: 8 August 1985 (age 41)
- Place of birth: Trnava, Czechoslovakia
- Height: 1.88 m (6 ft 2 in)
- Position: Goalkeeper

Team information
- Current team: SFM Senec
- Number: 20

Youth career
- 1993–2001: Lokomotíva Trnava
- 2001–2004: Spartak Trnava

Senior career*
Years	Team	Apps	(Gls)
2004–2005	Spartak Trnava	0	(0)
2005–2010	Kladno	17	(0)
2011–2013	Rimavská Sobota	75	(0)
2014–	SFM Senec	0	(0)
- * Club domestic league appearances and goals as of 1 January 2014

Peter Kostolanský (born 8 August 1985) is a Slovak football goalkeeper who is currently playing for SFM Senec.
