= Francky N'Guekam =

Cameroonian footballer

Personal information
- Full name: Francky N'Guekam
- Date of birth: 29 June 1989 (age 37)
- Place of birth: Douala, Cameroon
- Height: 1.85 m (6 ft 1 in)
- Position: Forward

Team information
- Current team: Arras

Senior career*
Years	Team	Apps	(Gls)
–2010	Valenciennes B		
2011–2012	Amiens	13	(1)
2012–2013	Calais	15	(1)
2014–2016	DAC Dunajská Streda	10	(1)
2016–2017	Grande-Synthe	6	(0)
2017–2018	Marck	11	(3)
2018–	Arras	5	(0)
- * Club domestic league appearances and goals as of 07:51, 27 April 2020 (UTC)

Francky N'Guekam (born 29 June 1989) is a Cameroonian footballer who plays for Arras.

== Club career ==
On 5 February 2014, N'Guekam signed a contract with Slovak side DAC 1904 Dunajská Streda. He made his debut for DAC on 1 March 2014 against Košice, entering in as a substitute in place of Matúš Turňa.
