= Martin Bukata =

Slovak footballer (born 1993)

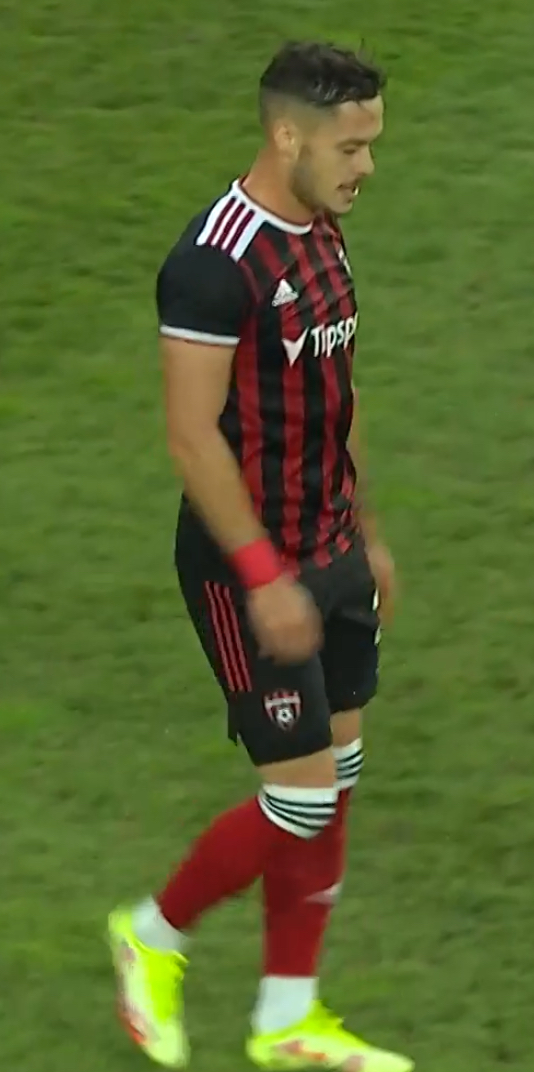
- Bukata in 2022

Personal information
- Date of birth: 2 October 1993 (age 33)
- Place of birth: Košice, Slovakia
- Height: 1.74 m (5 ft 9 in)
- Position: Midfielder

Team information
- Current team: Zlaté Moravce
- Number: 28

Youth career
- VSS Košice

Senior career*
Years	Team	Apps	(Gls)
2012–2015	VSS Košice	88	(4)
2016–2018	Piast Gliwice	61	(5)
2018	Benevento	0	(0)
2019–2020	Karviná	34	(1)
2020–2025	Spartak Trnava	102	(11)
2025–	Zlaté Moravce	28	(3)

International career
2009–2010	Slovakia U17	6	(0)
2012	Slovakia U19	1	(0)
2012–2014	Slovakia U21	4	(0)
2017	Slovakia	2	(0)
- * Club domestic league appearances and goals as of 25 May 2026

Martin Bukata (born 2 October 1993) is a Slovak professional footballer who plays as a midfielder for Zlaté Moravce.

== Club career ==
=== MFK/VSS Košice ===
Bukata made his first Corgoň Liga appearance on 11 March 2012, coming on as a substitute for Kamil Kuzma in the 84th minute of a 0–1 home loss against Slovan Bratislava. On 2 March 2013, he scored his first goals for Košice against the biggest rival team Tatran Prešov, Košice defeated Prešov 3–0.

=== Benevento ===
On 1 August 2018, Bukata signed with Serie B side Benevento. His Benevento contract was terminated by mutual consent on 9 January 2019.

=== Karviná ===
On 21 January 2019, he joined Czech club Karviná. He described the 2019–20 as unique and unusual, as he had to enter quarantine three-times, while with Karviná, due to the COVID-19 pandemic. He was a regular in the starting line-up initially but was later sidelined and placed on to the bench, contributing to him becoming free agent in July 2020.

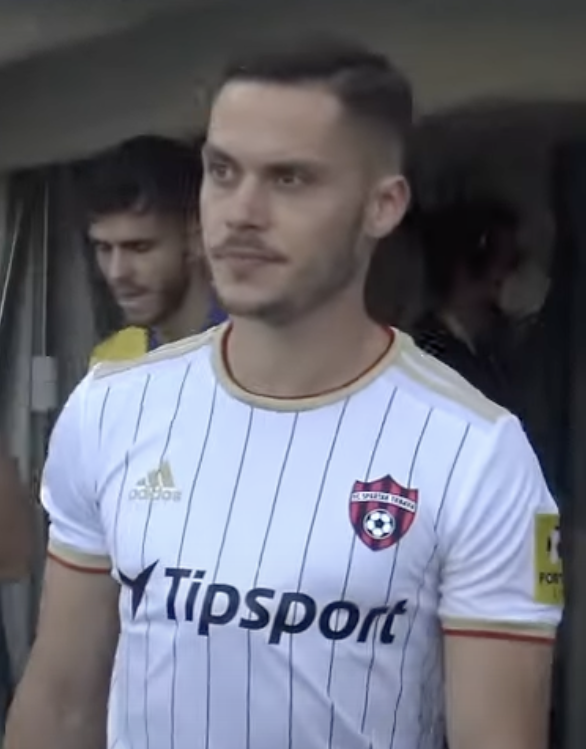
Bukata in 2021.

=== Spartak Trnava ===
On 27 July 2020, Bukata had signed with Spartak Trnava in his native Slovakia, joining the club's goalkeeper Dobrivoj Rusov, who is the godfather of Bukata's son. He also joined Erik Pačinda, a former teammate from VSS Košice, who had signed just days earlier. The club had disclosed that they had worked on Bukata's arrival for about a year and Bukata, in turn, expressed his gratitude and commitment to the club. Bukata scored the winning goal in a 2–1 win over Dnipro-1 in the Conference League play-offs, ultimately sending his team to the group stages of the competition for the first time in the clubs history. He played a total of 102 league games for Spartak, in which he scored 11 goals.

=== FC ViOn Zlaté Moravce ===
On 16 July 2025, it was announced that Bukata would be joining 2. Liga side FC ViOn Zlaté Moravce.

== International career ==
He debuted for the U-21 side on 21 March 2013 in a 0–1 away loss against Austria.

Bukata was first called up to the senior national team for two unofficial friendly fixtures held in Abu Dhabi, UAE, in January 2017, against Uganda and Sweden by his former coach from MFK Košice - Ján Kozák. He capped his debut against Uganda, being fielded from the start until the 70th minute, when he was substituted by Tomáš Huk. Slovakia went on to lose the game 1–3. Bukata also played the second half of the historic 0–6 loss to Sweden. It took about 5 years for his further recognitions in national team nominations, when Francesco Calzona listed him as an alternate fixtures in September and November, as well as prospective national team players' training camp in December.

== Honours ==
MFK Košice

- Slovak Cup: 2013–14

Spartak Trnava

- Slovak Cup: 2021–22, 2022–23, 2024–25
