= Roland Repiský =

Slovak footballer

Personal information
- Full name: Roland Repiský
- Date of birth: 30 May 1990 (age 36)
- Place of birth: Czechoslovakia
- Height: 1.96 m (6 ft 5 in)
- Position: Goalkeeper

Team information
- Current team: MFK Košice
- Number: 21

Youth career
- Šaca
- MFK Košice

Senior career*
Years	Team	Apps	(Gls)
2009–	MFK Košice	1	(0)
- * Club domestic league appearances and goals as of 25 May 2011

Roland Repiský (born 30 May 1990) is a Slovak football goalkeeper who currently plays for the Slovak Corgoň Liga club MFK Košice.
