= Radoslav Gondoľ =

Slovak footballer

Personal information
- Full name: Radoslav Gondoľ
- Date of birth: 7 May 1991 (age 35)
- Place of birth: Czechoslovakia
- Height: 1.84 m (6 ft 1/2 in)
- Position: Defender

Team information
- Current team: MFK Košice B
- Number: 3

Youth career
- MFK Košice

Senior career*
Years	Team	Apps	(Gls)
2010–	MFK Košice B	?	(0)
2011–2012	MFK Košice	1	(0)
- * Club domestic league appearances and goals as of 28 February 2012

Radoslav Gondoľ (born 7 May 1991 in Košice) is a Slovak football defender who currently plays for the Slovak Corgoň Liga club MFK Košice.

== Career ==
He made his debut for MFK Košice against Slovan Bratislava on 24 September 2011.
