= Roman Tarek =

Slovak footballer

Personal information
- Full name: Roman Tarek
- Date of birth: 14 April 1987 (age 39)
- Place of birth: Czechoslovakia
- Height: 1.82 m (5 ft 11 1/2 in)
- Position: Centre back

Team information
- Current team: ŠKF Sereď
- Number: 8

Youth career
- Inter Bratislava

Senior career*
Years	Team	Apps	(Gls)
2007–2009	Inter Bratislava	9	(0)
2009–2010	Senica	5	(0)
2010–2012	Pezinok		
2012–	Sereď		
- * Club domestic league appearances and goals as of 25 June 2015

Roman Tarek (born 14 April 1987) is a Slovak football defender who currently plays for the DOXXbet liga club ŠKF Sereď. He also played for Inter Bratislava and FK Senica.
