= Oumar Diaby =

French footballer (born 1990)

Personal information
- Date of birth: 7 February 1990 (age 36)
- Place of birth: Bayonne, France
- Height: 1.88 m (6 ft 2 in)
- Position: Forward

Youth career
- 1998–2003: Bayonne
- 2003-2007: Real Sociedad

Senior career*
Years	Team	Apps	(Gls)
2003–2009	Real Sociedad B		
2009–2010	Châteauroux B		
2010–2011	Genêts Anglet	32	(5)
2011–2012	Agde	13	(1)
2012–2015	VSS Košice	67	(13)
2015	Levski Sofia	11	(1)
2016	Hamilton Academical	6	(0)
2018–2019	Balma	14	(1)
Medal record
VSS Košice
Winner	Slovak Cup	2013–14
- * Club domestic league appearances and goals as of 1 July 2019

Oumar Diaby (born 7 February 1990) is a French former professional footballer who played as a forward. After developing at Real Sociedad in Spain, he has featured for clubs in his native country as well as in Bulgaria, Slovakia and Scotland.

== Career ==
Diaby was the first French player to move to the Real Sociedad academy at the age of 12 in 2002, which paved the way for other French players, including Antoine Griezmann.

In October 2012, he signed a three-year contract with MFK Košice. He made his debut for Košice against Dukla Banská Bystrica on 1 December 2012.

He signed for Scottish club Hamilton Academical in February 2016. He spoke about his problems with racism while he was playing in Slovakia and Bulgaria. In May 2016 it was announced that he would leave Hamilton at the end of the 2015–16 season.

After taking a break from football, in 2018 Diaby signed for amateurs Balma, based on the outskirts of Toulouse where his partner was studying.
