= Oliver Augustini =

Slovak footballer

Personal information
- Full name: Oliver Augustini
- Date of birth: 12 June 1990 (age 36)
- Place of birth: Ilava, Czechoslovakia
- Height: 1.73 m (5 ft 8 in)
- Position: Midfielder

Team information
- Current team: ASV Siegendorf

Youth career
- Dubnica

Senior career*
Years	Team	Apps	(Gls)
2010–2012	Dubnica	79	(6)
2013–2014	Spartak Trnava	18	(1)
2015–2016	Borčice		
2017–	ASV Siegendorf	75	(36)

International career
2012	Slovakia U21	1	(0)
- * Club domestic league appearances and goals as of 11 June 2015

Oliver Augustini (born 12 June 1990) is a Slovak football midfielder who currently plays for ASV Siegendorf.

== Club career ==
Augustini started his career off in Dubnica, not far from his hometown of Ilava.

He was transferred to Spartak Trnava in January 2013. He made his debut for them against Nitra on 2 March 2013.
