= Martin Matúš =

Slovak footballer

Personal information
- Full name: Martin Matúš
- Date of birth: 9 March 1982 (age 44)
- Place of birth: Žilina, Czechoslovakia
- Height: 1.80 m (5 ft 11 in)
- Position: Forward

Senior career*
Years	Team	Apps	(Gls)
- MŠK Žilina
2003–2005	REaMOS Kysucký Lieskovec		
2006	Rimavská Sobota		
2006–2007	Skałka Żabnica		
2007–2009	Podbeskidzie Bielsko-Biała	68	(17)
2009–2010	Ruch Radzionków	14	(3)
2010–2014	REaMOS Kysucký Lieskovec		
2012	→ Banská Bystrica (loan)	18	(4)
2013	→ Kremnička (loan)		
2013–2014	→ Dunajská Streda (loan)	25	(3)
2010–2014	Frýdek-Místek	25	(8)
2010–2014	Teplička nad Váhom	18	(2)
2016–2019	Naters	26	(6)
- * Club domestic league appearances and goals

Martin Matúš (born 9 March 1982) is a Slovak former professional footballer who played as a forward.

== FK Dukla Banská Bystrica ==
On 10 February 2012, Matúš has signed half-year contract for Slovak club Dukla Banská Bystrica. On 4 March 2012, Matúš made his Slovak Corgoň Liga debut for FK Dukla Banská Bystrica and scored his first goal against AS Trenčín, a 2–2 away draw.

== Honours ==
Ruch Radzionków

- II liga West: 2009–10
