= Ľubomír Korijkov =

Slovak footballer

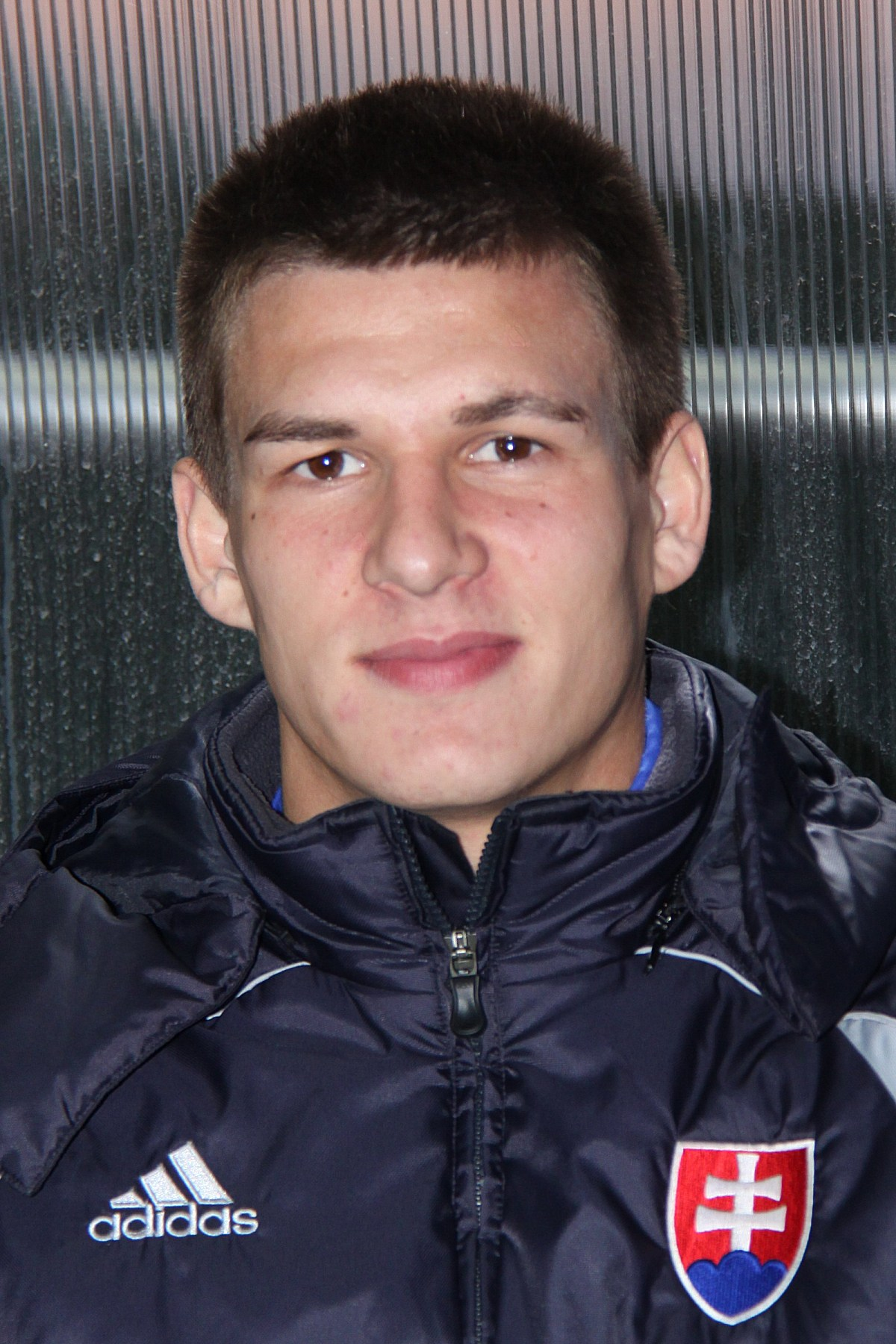

Personal information
- Full name: Ľubomír Korijkov
- Date of birth: 12 January 1993 (age 33)
- Place of birth: Košice, Slovakia
- Height: 1.84 m (6 ft 0 in)
- Position: Centre back

Team information
- Current team: Slávia TU Košice
- Number: 21

Youth career
- 2003–2005: Lokomotíva Košice
- 2005–2011: Košice

Senior career*
Years	Team	Apps	(Gls)
2011–2015	Košice	41	(0)
2011–2013	→ Zemplín Michalovce (loan)	27	(0)
2015–2017	Lokomotíva Košice	36	(2)
2017–2018	Berliner AK 07	9	(0)
2018	Lokomotíva Košice	12	(1)
2019	Partizán Bardejov	10	(2)
2019–2020	Slavoj Trebišov	18	(0)
2020–	Slávia TU Košice	129	(10)

International career
- Slovakia U15
2012	Slovakia U19	1	(1)
- * Club domestic league appearances and goals as of 25 May 2026

Ľubomír Korijkov (born 12 January 1993) is a Slovak football defender who plays for Slávia TU Košice.

== Club career ==
=== MFK Košice ===
He made his debut for Košice during a 4–2 home Corgoň Liga win against Nitra, coming on as a 77th minute substitute for Peter Šinglár.

== Private life ==
As of 2022, Korijkov also works in real estates, while he competes at a semi-professional level. Korijkov is of Bulgarian descent from his paternal side.
