= Andrej Lovás =

Slovak footballer

Personal information
- Full name: Andrej Lovás
- Date of birth: 28 May 1991 (age 35)
- Place of birth: Ružomberok, Czechoslovakia
- Height: 1.80 m (5 ft 11 in)
- Positions: Forward; winger

Team information
- Current team: TJ Čierny Brod

Youth career
- 2001–2008: Ružomberok

Senior career*
Years	Team	Apps	(Gls)
2008–2017	Ružomberok	123	(7)
2017–2019	Spartak Trnava	11	(0)
2019–2021	Malženice	11	(1)
2021–2023	Blava Jaslovské Bohunice	47	(4)
2024–	TJ Čierny Brod	0	(0)
- * Club domestic league appearances and goals as of 15:57, 6 January 2024 (UTC)

Andrej Lovás (born 28 May 1991) is a Slovak footballer who plays as a forward or winger for semi-professional side TJ Čierny Brod.

== Club career ==
Lovás made his league debut for Ružomberok on 27 May 2008 against Dukla Banská Bystrica.

In September 2019, Lovás joined Malženice.

== Honours ==
Spartak Trnava

- Fortuna Liga: 2017–18
- Slovnaft Cup: 2018–19
