= Mikuláš Tóth (footballer) =

Slovak footballer

Personal information
- Full name: Mikuláš Tóth
- Date of birth: 15 March 1988 (age 38)
- Place of birth: Košice, Czechoslovakia
- Height: 1.78 m (5 ft 10 in)
- Position: Right back

Youth career
- 1. FC Košice

Senior career*
Years	Team	Apps	(Gls)
- Košice-Barca
- FC Steel Trans Ličartovce
–2006	Humenné		
2006–2017	MFK Košice	150	(1)
2017–2018	Lokomotíva Košice	40	(0)
2019	FC Košice	9	(0)
- * Club domestic league appearances and goals as of 10 January 2020

Mikuláš Tóth (born 15 March 1988) is a Slovak football defender who most recently played for FC Košice.
