= MFK Snina =

Slovak football club

- Full name: MFK Snina
- Founded: 1927; 99 years ago as ŠK Snina
- Ground: Mestský futbalový štadión, Snina
- Capacity: 6,000 (1,200 seats)
- Head coach: René Kočan
- League: 3. liga
- 2025–26: 8th
- Website: https://www.facebook.com/mfksninaofficial
Home colours	Away colours

MFK Snina is a Slovak football team, based in the town of Snina. The club was founded in 1927.

== Clubname history ==
1. 1927 – ŠK Snina
2. 1945 – Sokol Snina
3. 1948 – Drevokombinát Snina
4. 1951 – Kovo Snina
5. 1952 – Spartak Snina
6. 1955 – Spartak Vihorlat Snina
7. 1991 – FC Vihorlat Snina
8. 1995–present – MFK Snina

== Current squad ==
Note: Flags indicate national team as defined under FIFA eligibility rules; some limited exceptions apply. Players may hold more than one non-FIFA nationality.

No.	Pos.	Nation	Player
21	GK	SVK	Miloš Lojka
2	DF	SVK	Jozef Lukáč
3	DF	SVK	František Hanc
5	DF	SVK	Ján Kopáč
6	FW	SVK	Štefan Pčola
7	MF	SVK	Peter Hišem
8	DF	SVK	Ľuboš Jankaj
9	FW	RUS	Mark Iablonskij
10	FW	SVK	Lukáš Bednár
11	MF	SVK	Juraj Popovič

No.	Pos.	Nation	Player
17	MF	UKR	Maksym Losiev
22	DF	SVK	Erik Hanc
1	GK	SVK	Alexander Burda

== Notable players ==
Had international caps for their respective countries. Players whose name is listed in bold represented their countries while playing for MFK.

Past (and present) players who are the subjects of Wikipedia articles can be found here.

- (Slovakia) Pavol Diňa
- (Slovakia) Ondrej Duda
- (Slovakia) Erik Pačinda
- (Slovakia) Ján Mucha
