= Jozef Skvašík =

Slovak footballer

Personal information
- Full name: Jozef Skvašík
- Date of birth: 8 September 1991 (age 35)
- Place of birth: Snina, Czechoslovakia
- Height: 1.83 m (6 ft 0 in)
- Position: Midfielder

Team information
- Current team: MFK Snina

Youth career
- HFC Humenné
- MFK Košice

Senior career*
Years	Team	Apps	(Gls)
2010–2015	MFK Košice	46	(3)
2015	→ Zvolen (loan)	12	(0)
2016–2019	MFK Snina	?	(?)
2019–2021	FK Humenné	?	(?)
2021–	MFK Snina	?	(?)
- * Club domestic league appearances and goals as of 22 January 2023

Jozef Skvašík (born 8 September 1991) is a Slovak professional footballer who plays as a midfielder for MFK Snina.

== Career ==
In January 2019, Skvašík joined FK Humenné.
