= Juraj Hovančík =

Slovak footballer

Personal information
- Date of birth: 22 November 1990 (age 35)
- Place of birth: Prešov, Czechoslovakia
- Height: 1.88 m (6 ft 2 in)
- Positions: Defensive midfielder; centre back

Team information
- Current team: Odeva Lipany
- Number: 44

Youth career
- Šarišské Dravce
- Odeva Lipany

Senior career*
| Years | Team | Apps | (Gls) |
| 2008–2013 | MFK Košice | 81 | (2) |
| 2014–2015 | ŽP Šport Podbrezová | 14 | (1) |
| 2015–2016 | VSS Košice | 23 | (1) |
| 2017 | Tatran Prešov | 12 | (0) |
| 2018 | Lokomotíva Košice | 19 | (1) |
| 2019– | Odeva Lipany | 28 | (1) |

International career
| 2008–2009 | Slovakia U19 | 5 | (0) |
- * Club domestic league appearances and goals as of 10 June 2020

Juraj Hovančík (born 22 November 1990) is a Slovak football midfielder who currently plays for Odeva Lipany.
