= Erik Sabo =

Slovak footballer

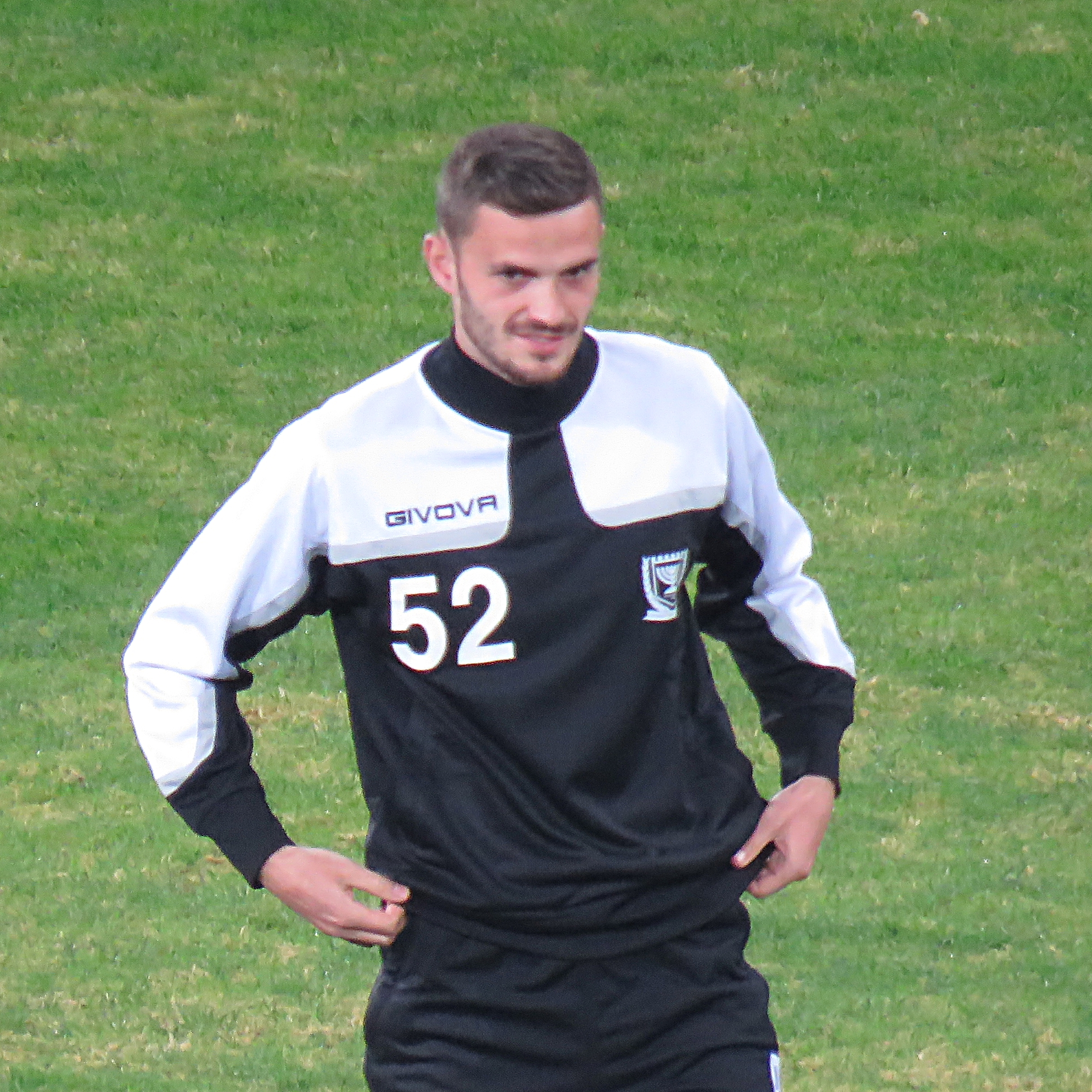
- Sabo playing for Beitar (2016)

Personal information
- Date of birth: 22 November 1991 (age 35)
- Place of birth: Šúrovce, Czechoslovakia
- Height: 1.87 m (6 ft 2 in)
- Positions: Midfielder; centre-back

Team information
- Current team: Spartak Trnava
- Number: 52

Youth career
- Horses Šúrovce
- Spartak Trnava

Senior career*
Years	Team	Apps	(Gls)
2010–2015	Spartak Trnava	95	(25)
2011–2012	→ Spartak Myjava (loan)	34	(3)
2015–2016	PAOK	14	(0)
2016–2018	Beitar Jerusalem	64	(9)
2018–2019	Hapoel Be'er Sheva	29	(1)
2019–2021	Fatih Karagümrük	45	(14)
2021–2022	Çaykur Rizespor	52	(3)
2022–2023	Anorthosis Famagusta	29	(2)
2024	AEZ Zakakiou	18	(1)
2024–	Spartak Trnava	63	(6)

International career^{‡}
2012	Slovakia U21	2	(0)
2014–2020	Slovakia	18	(0)
- * Club domestic league appearances and goals as of 21 November 2026 ‡ National team caps and goals as of 30 March 2021

Erik Sabo (born 22 November 1991) is a Slovak professional footballer who plays as a midfielder for Slovak club Spartak Trnava.

== Club career ==
Sabo made his debut for Spartak Trnava against Slovan Bratislava on 25 February 2011. He spent one year on loan at Spartak Myjava, playing in the second division.

In August 2015, Spartak Trnava announced Sabo's transfer to PAOK. He signed a four-year contract. On 3 December 2015, Sabo was the MVP of a 6–2 away victory for PAOK over Chania, as Igor Tudor's team advanced to the next round of Greek Cup. Sabo scored three times, while Jairo, Giannis Mystakidis and Dimitrios Pelkas marked the visitors' other three goals. He finished the season with 24 appearances and 3 goals in all competitions.

On 16 July 2016, it was announced that Sabo had signed a season-long loan deal with Beitar Jerusalem with an option of making the move permanent set to €400,000. In August 2016 he was linked with a move to 2. Bundesliga club VfL Bochum but had to overpass legal issues due to his signing to Beitar Jerusalem. According to media, Sabo would continue his career with Beitar Jerusalem, as the Israeli club on 1 July 2017 activated the buy-out clause in the player's loan contract. On 22 July 2019, Sabo joined Turkish club Fatih Karagümrük.

=== Anorthosis Famagusta ===
On 29 July 2022, Sabo joined Anorthosis Famagusta F.C. of the Cypriot First Division on a two-year deal.

=== Spartak Trnava ===
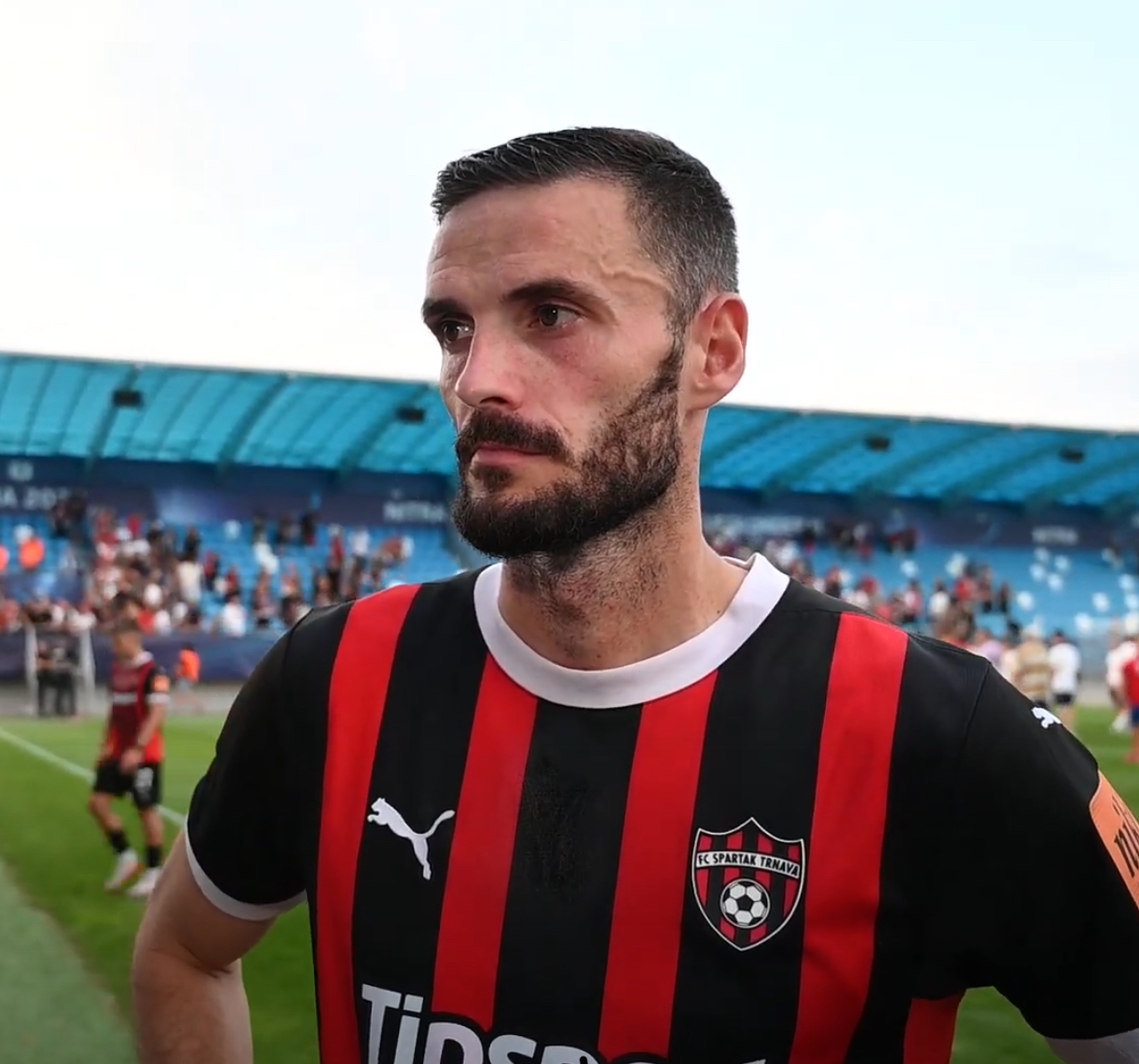
Sabo being interviewed in 2025.

On 6 August 2024, Sabo came back to Spartak Trnava on a one-year contract. On 15 April 2025, he scored the winning penalty in a penalty shoot-out against ŠK Slovan Bratislava in the semi final of the Slovak Cup. On 19 June 2025 it was announced by the club that Sabo had agreed to a one-year extension to his contract. In a 2–1 win over FC Košice in the league, Sabo scored the winning goal in the 93rd minute of the game to secure the win. It was also Sabo's 34th birthday.

== International career ==
Sabo made his national team debut against Montenegro on 23 May 2014. He appeared frequently in Ján Kozák's nominations, despite not appearing in many of the matches. Kozák, however, resigned in October 2018 and was subsequently replaced by Czech Pavel Hapal. Hapal did not call up Sabo for double UEFA Euro 2020 qualifying fixture against Hungary and Wales, making Sabo's absence from the national team during competitive fixtures the first, since September 2016.

== Honours ==
Spartak Trnava

- Slovak Cup: 2024–25
