= Tomáš Kubík (footballer, born 1992) =

Slovak footballer

Personal information
- Full name: Tomáš Kubík
- Date of birth: 18 March 1992 (age 34)
- Place of birth: Spišská Nová Ves, Slovakia
- Height: 1.80 m (5 ft 11 in)
- Position: Forward

Team information
- Current team: SC Bad Sauerbrunn
- Number: 7

Youth career
- TJ Slovan Smižany
- FK Spišská Nová Ves
- MFK Košice

Senior career*
Years	Team	Apps	(Gls)
2011–2017	MFK Košice	60	(2)
2013	→ Rimavská Sobota (loan)	9	(0)
2017	Spišská Nová Ves	17	(3)
2018–	SC Bad Sauerbrunn	62	(35)
- * Club domestic league appearances and goals as of 19:09, 4 June 2020 (UTC)

Tomáš Kubík (born 18 March 1992) is a Slovak football player who currently plays for SC Bad Sauerbrunn.
