= Peter Kavka =

Slovak footballer

Personal information
- Full name: Peter Kavka
- Date of birth: 20 November 1990 (age 35)
- Place of birth: Czechoslovakia
- Height: 1.88 m (6 ft 2 in)
- Position: Centre back

Youth career
- MFK Košice

Senior career*
Years	Team	Apps	(Gls)
2010–2015	MFK Košice	103	(3)
2016	Vlašim	18	(1)
2017–2018	Zemplín Michalovce	50	(2)
2019	Lokomotíva Košice	8	(0)
2019–2022	FC Košice	42	(0)
- * Club domestic league appearances and goals as of 22 June 2022

Peter Kavka (born 20 November 1990) is a Slovak football retired footballer who last played for FC Košice.
