= Kamil Kuzma =

Slovak footballer (born 1988)

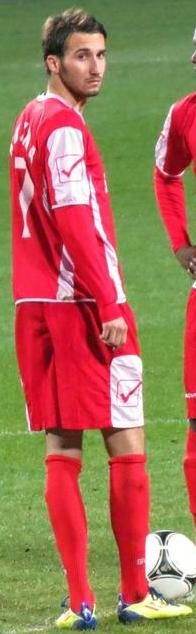

Personal information
- Full name: Kamil Kuzma
- Date of birth: 8 March 1988 (age 38)
- Place of birth: Stropkov, Czechoslovakia
- Height: 1.85 m (6 ft 1 in)
- Position: Midfielder

Team information
- Current team: Stropkov

Youth career
- Stropkov
- 2003–2008: Košice

Senior career*
Years	Team	Apps	(Gls)
2008–2013	Košice	108	(3)
2013	→ SFM Senec (loan)	12	(2)
2013–2015	Spartak Trnava	37	(3)
2015–2016	Košice	16	(1)
2016–2018	Podbrezová	36	(2)
2017	→ Podbrezová II (loan)	9	(1)
2019–	Stropkov	0	(0)

International career
2006	Slovakia U19	2	(0)
2008–2009	Slovakia U21	7	(0)
- * Club domestic league appearances and goals as of 25 January 2019

Kamil Kuzma (born 8 March 1988) is a Slovak footballer who plays for MŠK Tesla Stropkov as a midfielder.

Kuzma joined Spartak Trnava from VSS Košice in the summer of 2013, where he debuted in July against AS Trenčín. He also played in European competitions for the first time, helping the club advance to the 3rd round of the 2014–15 UEFA Europa League.

He is a former youth representative, playing for the U21 team.

== Club career ==
Kuzma is a graduate of the FC VSS Košice youth academy, being promoted in 2008. In 2011, he “resigned” from the club.

=== Spartak Trnava ===
Kuzma was signed by Spartak Trnava in July 2013, signing a 2 year contract. He made his debut for the club against AS Trenčín on 21 July 2013. He was sent off in the match for kicking an opponent’s leg. Following the match, the SFZ decided to ban him for 4 matches. He helped the club advance to the 3rd qualifying round of the 2014–15 UEFA Europa League, where Trnava was eliminated by the Swiss team FC Zürich. In the 2015 winter preparations, Kuzma would get injured in a friendly against Veľké Meder, cracked maxillary sinus after getting in a fight with one of the oppositions player. After being released by Spartak Trnava in the summer of 2015, he would go on trial at Polish club GKS Górnik Łęczna.

=== Later career ===
In July 2015, Kuzma joined Czech team FC Fastav Zlín as a free agent on a trial basis, but eventually returned FC VSS Košice. In the summer of 2016, he transferred to ZP SPORT Podbrezova, signing a two-year contract. He remained with Podbrezová until the end of 2017. In January 2018, he trained with the Slovak second-division club ŠKF Sereď.

== International career ==
Kuzma played a total of 8 matches for the Slovakia national under-21 football team.

== Honours ==
Košice

- Slovak Cup: 2009
