= Darko Tofiloski =

Macedonian footballer (born 1986)

Personal information
- Date of birth: 13 January 1986 (age 40)
- Place of birth: Prilep, SR Macedonia
- Height: 1.94 m (6 ft 4 in)
- Position: Goalkeeper

Team information
- Current team: Besa Dobërdoll

Youth career
- Pobeda

Senior career*
Years	Team	Apps	(Gls)
2004–2008	Pobeda	59	(0)
2008–2010	Schaffhausen	13	(0)
2010–2015	Košice	134	(0)
2015–2016	Ružomberok	27	(0)
2016–2017	Dunajská Streda	13	(0)
2017	Alashkert	1	(0)
2018–2019	Pobeda	44	(0)
2019–2020	Drita	19	(0)
2021	Trepca 89	12	(0)
2021	Tikvesh	6	(0)
2022–2023	Pobeda	23	(0)
2023–	Besa Dobërdoll		

International career
2008	Macedonia U21	14	(0)
2013	Macedonia	1	(0)
- * Club domestic league appearances and goals as of 1 May 2023

Darko Tofiloski (born 13 January 1986) is a Macedonian footballer who plays as a goalkeeper for Besa Dobërdoll.

== Club career ==
He played for FK Pobeda in 2005 UEFA Intertoto Cup.

He was released by FC Schaffhausen in March 2010. He was suspected as one of the players involved in 2009 European football betting scandal but the investigation terminated after lack of evidence.

== International career ==
He played at 2006, 2007 and 2009 UEFA European Under-21 Football Championship qualification.

He made his senior debut for Macedonia in a June 2013 friendly match against Norway, his sole international appearance.
