= Lukáš Urban =

Slovak footballer

Personal information
- Full name: Lukáš Urban
- Date of birth: 23 June 1993 (age 33)
- Place of birth: Košice, Slovakia
- Height: 1.74 m (5 ft 9 in)
- Position: Defensive midfielder

Team information
- Current team: FC Košice
- Number: 8

Youth career
- MFK Košice

Senior career*
Years	Team	Apps	(Gls)
2013–2015	FC VSS Košice	9	(0)
2014–2015	VSS Košice B	19	(0)
2015	Vyšné Opátske		
2019–2020	FC Košice		
2019–2020	Slávia TU Košice (loan)		
2020–2024	Slávia TU Košice		
2024–	Lokomotiva Košice		
- * Club domestic league appearances and goals as of 29 August 2016

Lukáš Urban (born 23 June 1993) is a Slovak football midfielder who currently plays for the 3. liga club FC Lokomotíva Košice.

== Club career ==
=== MFK Košice ===
Urban is a product of the Košice youth academy, from where he went to play for the B team. Two years later, Urban got his first professional contract. He made his debut for the club in a 2–2 home Corgoň Liga draw against MFK Ružomberok, coming on as an 80th minute substitution. Despite being considered a talented young player, Urban would quit professional football to focus on his studies.

=== Slávia TU Košice ===
In 2024, Urban played for Slávia TU Košice. He scored in a 2–0 win against ŠK Odeva Lipany, netting in a goal in the 90th minute.
