= Boris Sekulić =

Footballer (born 1991)

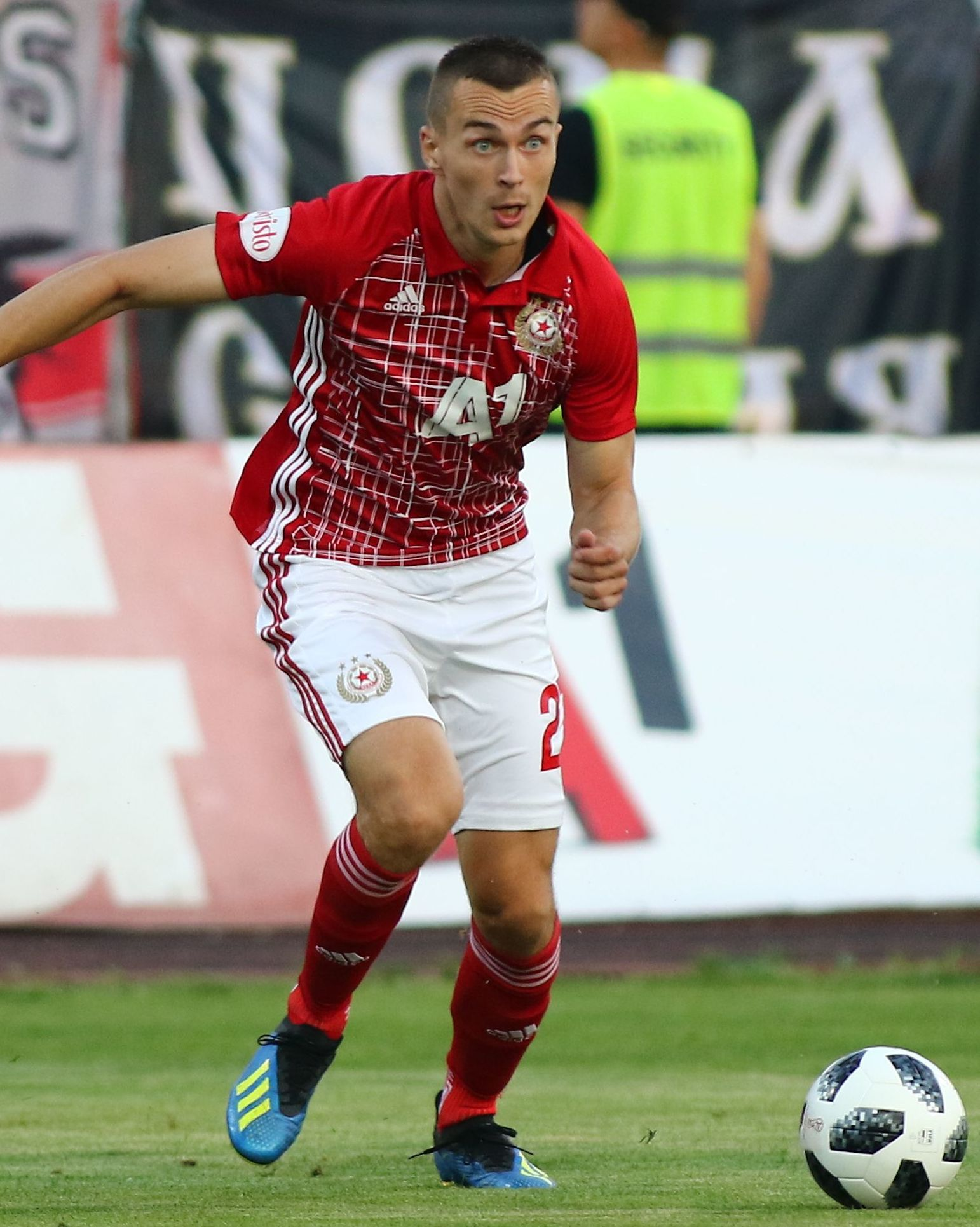
- Sekulić with CSKA Sofia in 2018

Personal information
- Date of birth: 21 October 1991 (age 35)
- Place of birth: Zemun, SR Serbia, Yugoslavia
- Height: 1.87 m (6 ft 2 in)
- Position: Defender

Team information
- Current team: Spartak Subotica
- Number: 2

Youth career
- Zemun

Senior career*
| Years | Team | Apps | (Gls) |
| 2009–2010 | Zemun | 0 | (0) |
| 2009–2010 | → Grafičar Beograd (loan) | 19 | (0) |
| 2010–2011 | Beograd | 27 | (1) |
| 2011–2015 | Košice | 101 | (5) |
| 2015–2018 | Slovan Bratislava | 82 | (2) |
| 2018–2019 | CSKA Sofia | 12 | (0) |
| 2019–2020 | Górnik Zabrze | 34 | (2) |
| 2020–2022 | Chicago Fire | 82 | (4) |
| 2023–2024 | Górnik Zabrze | 38 | (1) |
| 2024 | Karmiotissa | 1 | (0) |
| 2024–2025 | Železničar Pančevo | 20 | (0) |
| 2025– | Spartak Subotica | 28 | (0) |

International career^{‡}
| 2018– | Slovakia | 4 | (0) |
- * Club domestic league appearances and goals as of 13 June 2026 ‡ National team caps and goals as of 3 April 2022

Boris Sekulić (Serbian Cyrillic: Борис Секулић; born 21 October 1991) is a professional footballer who plays as a defender for Spartak Subotica. Born in Serbia, he plays for the Slovakia national team.

== Club career ==
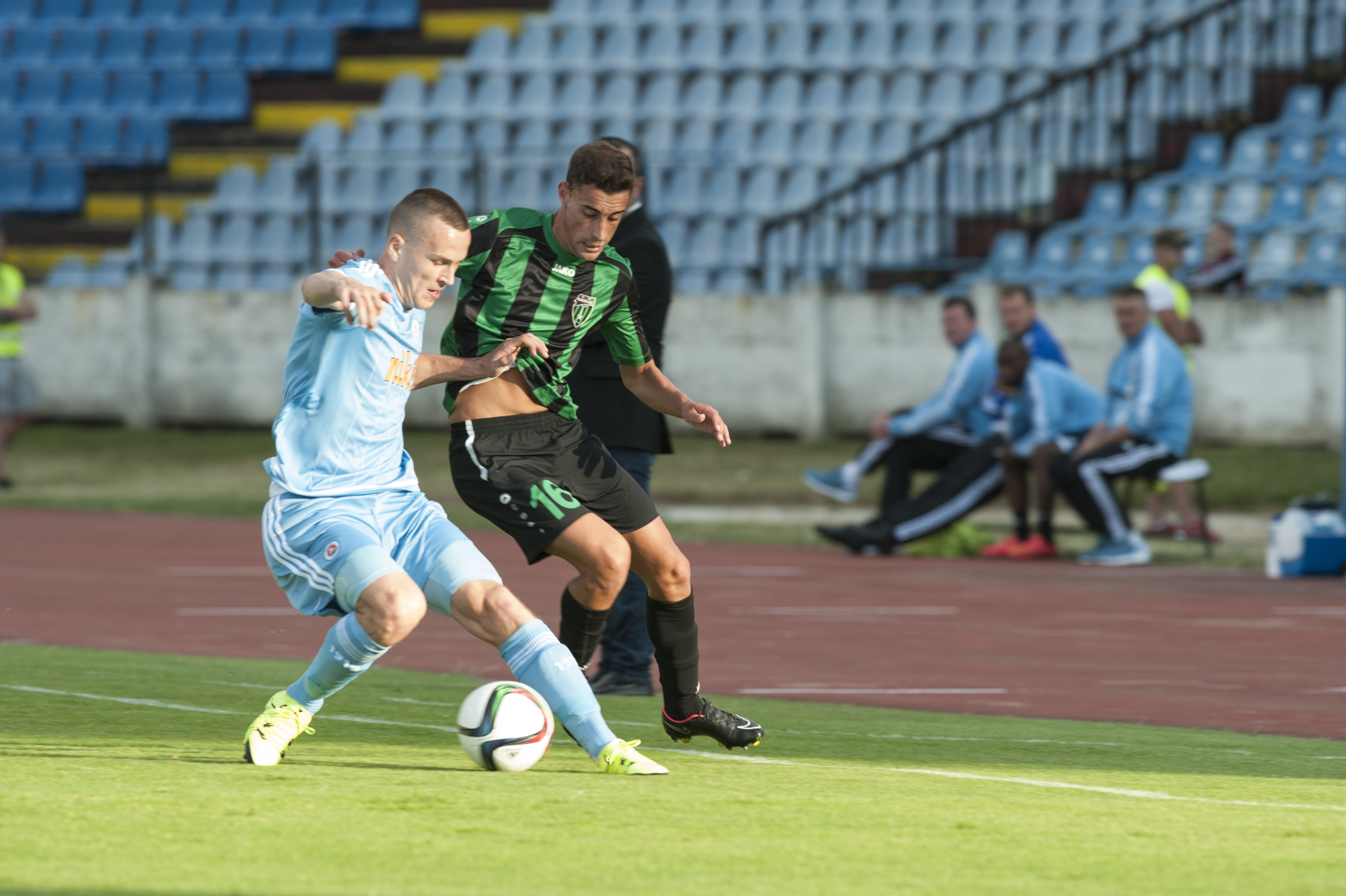
Sekulić in action for Slovan Bratislava in 2015

Born in Zemun, Sekulić started his career playing in the youth team of local club FK Zemun. In 2009 he became senior and played on loan at Grafičar Beograd. The following season he signed with Beograd.

In the summer of 2011 he moved abroad to Slovakia and joined Košice at the age of 19. Sekulić was a stable player for Košice Reserves, making 13 appearances. On 3 March 2012, he made his debut for the first team, playing ninety minutes of a derby match, in a 1–0 away win against Tatran Prešov.

On 20 June 2018, Sekulić signed with Bulgarian First League side CSKA Sofia, after a three-year spell with Slovan Bratislava, during which he obtained Slovak citizenship.

On 15 February 2020, Sekulić moved to Major League Soccer side Chicago Fire on a three-year deal. On 11 October 2020, he scored his first MLS goal against D.C. United at Soldier Field. He left Chicago following the expiration of his contract at the end of the 2022 season.

On 17 February 2023, Sekulić returned to Górnik Zabrze on an eighteen-month contract. He left the club at the end of his contract on 30 June 2024.

In July 2024, Sekulić joined Cypriot First Division club Karmiotissa.

== International career ==
In August 2017, Sekulić obtained Slovak citizenship, making him eligible to represent Slovakia and in March 2018 he was called up to the national team by his former coach at MFK Košice, Ján Kozák, for two fixtures at 2018 King's Cup. Although he was benched in the semi-final 2–1 win over UAE, he played the entire final game against Thailand (3–2 win) as a right-back.

== Career statistics ==
=== Club ===
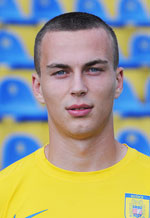

As of match played 4 November 2024

Appearances and goals by club, season and competition
| Club | Season | League | | | National cup (Note: Includes Slovak Cup, Bulgarian Cup, Polish Cup, Serbian Cup) | | Continental | | Other | | Total | |
| Club | Season | Division | Apps | Goals | Apps | Goals | Apps | Goals | Apps | Goals | Apps | Goals |
|---|---|---|---|---|---|---|---|---|---|---|---|---|
| Košice | 2011–12 | Slovak Super Liga | 13 | 0 | — | | — | | — | | 13 | 0 |
| Košice | 2012–13 | Slovak Super Liga | 32 | 0 | 4 | 0 | — | | — | | 36 | 0 |
| Košice | 2013–14 | Slovak Super Liga | 31 | 3 | 6 | 0 | — | | — | | 37 | 3 |
| Košice | 2014–15 | Slovak Super Liga | 25 | 2 | 4 | 0 | 2 (Note: Appearance(s) in UEFA Europa League) | 0 | 1 (Note: Appearance(s) in Slovak Super Cup) | 0 | 32 | 2 |
| Košice | Total | | 101 | 5 | 14 | 0 | 2 | 0 | 1 | 0 | 118 | 5 |
| Slovan Bratislava | 2015–16 | Slovak Super Liga | 31 | 0 | 6 | 0 | 6 | 0 | — | | 43 | 0 |
| Slovan Bratislava | 2016–17 | Slovak Super Liga | 22 | 0 | 5 | 0 | 3 | 0 | — | | 30 | 0 |
| Slovan Bratislava | 2017–18 | Slovak Super Liga | 29 | 2 | 5 | 0 | 4 | 1 | 1 (Note: Appearance(s) in Czechoslovak Supercup) | 0 | 39 | 3 |
| Slovan Bratislava | Total | | 82 | 2 | 16 | 0 | 13 | 1 | 1 | 0 | 112 | 3 |
| CSKA Sofia | 2018–19 | First League | 12 | 0 | 1 | 0 | 6 | 0 | — | | 19 | 0 |
| Górnik Zabrze | 2018–19 | Ekstraklasa | 13 | 2 | 1 | 0 | — | | — | | 14 | 2 |
| Górnik Zabrze | 2019–20 | Ekstraklasa | 21 | 0 | 1 | 0 | — | | — | | 22 | 0 |
| Górnik Zabrze | Total | | 34 | 2 | 2 | 0 | 0 | 0 | 0 | 0 | 36 | 2 |
| Chicago Fire | 2020 | Major League Soccer | 21 | 2 | — | | — | | — | | 21 | 2 |
| Chicago Fire | 2021 | Major League Soccer | 28 | 2 | — | | — | | — | | 28 | 2 |
| Chicago Fire | 2022 | Major League Soccer | 33 | 0 | 0 | 0 | — | | — | | 33 | 0 |
| Chicago Fire | Total | | 82 | 4 | 0 | 0 | 0 | 0 | 0 | 0 | 82 | 4 |
| Górnik Zabrze | 2022–23 | Ekstraklasa | 11 | 1 | — | | — | | — | | 11 | 2 |
| Górnik Zabrze | 2023–24 | Ekstraklasa | 27 | 0 | 2 | 0 | — | | — | | 29 | 0 |
| Górnik Zabrze | Total | | 38 | 1 | 2 | 0 | 0 | 0 | 0 | 0 | 40 | 2 |
| Karmiotissa | 2024–25 | Cypriot First Division | 1 | 0 | 0 | 0 | — | | — | | 1 | 0 |
| Železničar Pančevo | 2024–25 | Serbian SuperLiga | 20 | 0 | 1 | 0 | — | | — | | 21 | 0 |
| Career total | | | 370 | 14 | 36 | 0 | 21 | 1 | 2 | 0 | 429 | 15 |

=== International ===
As of match played 29 March 2022

Appearances and goals by national team and year
| National team | Year | Apps | Goals |
|---|---|---|---|
| Slovakia | 2018 | 2 | 0 |
| Slovakia | 2022 | 2 | 0 |
| Total | | 4 | 0 |

== Honours ==
Košice

- Slovak Cup: 2013–14

Slovan Bratislava

- Slovak Cup: 2016–17, 2017–18

Slovakia

- King's Cup: 2018
