= Erik Pačinda =

Slovak footballer

Personal information
- Full name: Erik Pačinda
- Date of birth: 9 May 1989 (age 37)
- Place of birth: Košice, Czechoslovakia
- Height: 1.75 m (5 ft 9 in)
- Positions: Forward; winger

Team information
- Current team: Snina
- Number: 11

Youth career
- Košice

Senior career*
Years	Team	Apps	(Gls)
2005–2006	Horn	29	(0)
2010–2015	Košice	93	(19)
2012–2013	→ Tours (loan)	1	(0)
2015–2018	DAC Dunajská Streda	93	(32)
2019–2020	Viktoria Plzeň	11	(1)
2019–2020	→ Korona Kielce (loan)	21	(4)
2020	Spartak Trnava	12	(5)
2021–2024	FC Košice	73	(34)
2024	Michalovce	10	(1)
2025	Snina	17	(5)
2025	Spišská Nová Ves	?	(?)
2026-	Lokomotíva Košice	0	(0)

International career
2018	Slovakia	4	(1)
- * Club domestic league appearances and goals as of 1 January 2025

Erik Pačinda (born 9 May 1989) is a Slovak professional footballer who plays as a forward or winger for MFK Snina.

== Club career ==
Pačinda previously played for DAC Dunajská Streda, Košice or Viktoria Plzeň.

== International career ==
Pačinda was first called up to the national team on 13 March 2018, when he was nominated for two fixtures at 2018 King's Cup by his former coach at Košice, Ján Kozák. Although he was benched for the first game against UAE (2–1 win), on 25 March 2018 he made his international debut against Thailand. Firstly, in the 34th minute he assisted Róbert Mak, who set the score to 2–0. Later on, in 67th minute Pačinda himself scored with a left-foot shot after receiving a pass from his former team-mate from MFK Košice, Ondrej Duda. Pačinda completed the entire match as a left-winger and contributed to Slovakia's 3–2 victory and second triumph in their second appearance at the King's Cup (the first was in 2004).

=== International goals ===
Scores and results list Slovakia's goal tally first.

No	Date	Venue	Opponent	Score	Result	Competition
1.	25 March 2018	Rajamangala National Stadium, Bangkok, Thailand	Thailand	3–1	3–2	2018 King's Cup

== Honours ==
Košice

- Slovak Cup: 2013–14

FC Košice

- 2. Liga: 2022–23
