= Ivan Ostojić =

Serbian footballer

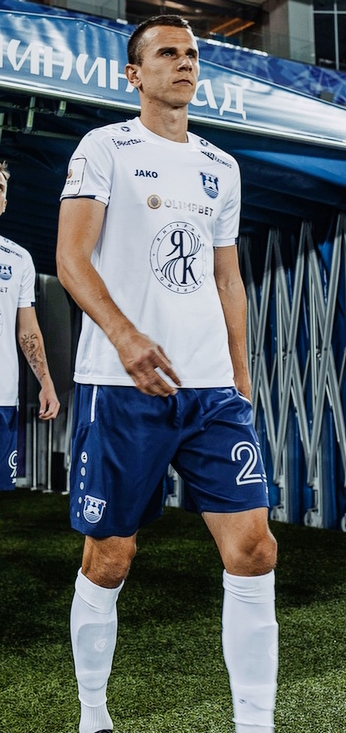

Personal information
- Date of birth: 26 June 1989 (age 37)
- Place of birth: Pančevo, SFR Yugoslavia
- Height: 1.90 m (6 ft 3 in)
- Position: Centre-back

Team information
- Current team: Zemun
- Number: 21

Youth career
- Dinamo Pančevo

Senior career*
Years	Team	Apps	(Gls)
2007–2009	Radnik Stari Tamiš		
2010–2011	Dolina Padina		
2011–2015	Košice	92	(2)
2014–2015	Košice B	3	(0)
2016	Spartak Myjava	28	(1)
2017	Karmiotissa	7	(0)
2017–2019	Dukla Prague	47	(0)
2019	Radnički Niš	19	(1)
2020	HJK Helsinki	13	(0)
2021	Javor Ivanjica	19	(0)
2021–2024	Baltika Kaliningrad	71	(5)
2024–2025	Napredak Kruševac	19	(0)
2025–	Zemun	30	(2)
- * Club domestic league appearances and goals as of 14 May 2026

Ivan Ostojić (Serbian Cyrillic: Иван Остојић; born 26 June 1989) is a Serbian professional footballer who plays as a centre-back for Zemun.

== Club career ==
On 5 August 2011, Ostojić joined Slovak club MFK Košice. He made his debut on 4 April 2012 when Košice drew 0–0 to Banská Bystrica.

On 1 July 2021, Ostojić joined Russian First League club Baltika Kaliningrad on a three-year contract and a one-year option.

== Career statistics ==
As of 2 June 2024

Appearances and goals by club, season and competition
Club	Season	League			National Cup		Continental		Other		Total	
Club	Season	Division	Apps	Goals	Apps	Goals	Apps	Goals	Apps	Goals	Apps	Goals
Košice	2011–12	Corgon Liga	7	0	—		—		—		7	0
Košice	2012–13	Corgon Liga	30	2	4	0	—		—		34	2
Košice	2013–14	Corgon Liga	22	0	6	0	—		—		28	0
Košice	2014–15	Fortuna Liga	24	0	1	0	2 (Note: Appearance(s) in UEFA Europa League)	0	—		27	0
Košice	2015–16	II. Liga East	9	0	2	0	—		—		11	0
Košice	Total		92	2	13	0	2	0	—		109	2
Košice B	2014–15	II. Liga East	3	0	—		—		—		3	0
Spartak Myjava	2015–16	Fortuna Liga	11	0	0	0	—		—		11	0
Spartak Myjava	2016–17	Fortuna Liga	17	1	2	0	2	0	—		21	1
Spartak Myjava	Total		28	1	2	0	2	0	0	0	32	1
Karmiotissa	2016–17	Cypriot First Division	7	0	—		—		—		7	0
Dukla Prague	2017–18	Czech First League	23	0	2	1	—		—		25	1
Dukla Prague	2018–19	Czech First League	24	0	3	0	—		—		27	0
Dukla Prague	Total		47	0	5	1	—		—		52	1
Radnički Niš	2019–20	Serbian SuperLiga	19	1	1	0	2	0	—		22	1
Helsinki	2020	Veikkausliiga	13	0	5	0	—		—		18	0
Javor Ivanjica	2020–21	Serbian SuperLiga	19	0	0	0	—		—		19	0
Baltika Kaliningrad	2021–22	Russian First League	32	1	4	1	—		—		36	2
Baltika Kaliningrad	2022–23	Russian First League	25	4	—		—		—		25	4
Baltika Kaliningrad	2023–24	Russian Premier League	14	0	7	0	—		—		21	0
Baltika Kaliningrad	Total		71	5	11	0	0	0	0	0	82	5
Career total			299	9	37	2	6	0	0	0	342	11
