= Peter Bašista =

Slovak footballer

Personal information
- Full name: Peter Bašista
- Date of birth: 6 April 1985 (age 41)
- Place of birth: Prešov, Czechoslovakia
- Height: 1.86 m (6 ft 1 in)
- Position: Centre-back

Team information
- Current team: Slovan Kendice; Tatran Prešov U17 (manager)

Youth career
- MFK Slovan Sabinov
- 1998–2001: Tatran Prešov

Senior career*
Years	Team	Apps	(Gls)
2001–2003	Tatran Prešov	5	(0)
2003–2004	FC Ličartovce		(0)
2004–2005	Žilina	8	(0)
2005–2009	Košice	74	(3)
2010–2012	Sparta Prague	0	(0)
2010–2012	→ Tatran Prešov (loan)	19	(0)
2012–2015	Košice	66	(0)
2015–2016	Iskra Borčice	19	(3)
2017	Polonia Bytom	9	(0)
2018–2019	Stal Rzeszów	42	(1)
2019–2020	Wólczanka Wólka Pełkińska	11	(0)
2022	Slovan Sabinov		
2023–	Slovan Kendice		

International career
2002–2004	Slovakia U19		
2005	Slovakia U21		

Managerial career
- 2022: Slovan Sabinov (player-manager)
- 2023–: Tatran Prešov U17
- * Club domestic league appearances and goals as of 10:37, 6 April 2024 (UTC)

Peter Bašista (born 6 April 1985) is a Slovak footballer and manager who plays as a centre-back for Slovan Kendice.

== Career ==
On 13 July 2001, Bašista became a youngest player at the time in the Corgoň Liga as sixteen years and 98 days old.

On 31 July 2019 it was announced, that Bašista had joined Polish III liga club Wólczanka Wólka Pełkińska.

== Career statistics ==
Club	Season	League		Domestic Cup		Europe		Total	
Club	Season	Pld	GF	Pld	GF	Pld	GF	Pld	GF
MFK Košice	2006/07	27	1	1	1	0	0	28	2
MFK Košice	2007/08	21	1	5	0	0	0	26	1
MFK Košice	2008/09	15	1	4	0	0	0	19	1
MFK Košice	2009/10	11	0	0	0	4	1	15	1
Total		74	3	10	1	4	1	88	5

^{Last updated: 28 December 2009}

== Honours ==
Košice

- Slovak Cup: 2008–09, 2013–14

Stal Rzeszów

- III liga, gr. IV: 2018–19
