= Peter Šinglár =

Slovak footballer (born 1979)

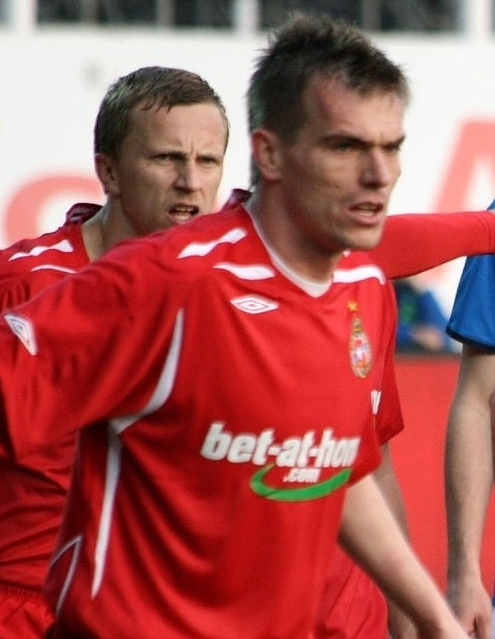

Personal information
- Full name: Peter Šinglár
- Date of birth: 24 July 1979 (age 47)
- Place of birth: Prešov, Czechoslovakia
- Height: 1.83 m (6 ft 0 in)
- Positions: Defensive midfielder; defender

Team information
- Current team: Košice (assistant)

Senior career*
Years	Team	Apps	(Gls)
1998–1999	Tatran Prešov	0	(0)
1999–2004	Steel Trans Ličartovce		
2002	→ Dubnica (loan)	17	(2)
2004–2008	Slovan Liberec	105	(3)
2008–2010	Wisła Kraków	20	(1)
2010–2017	Košice	167	(6)
2017–2018	Záhradné	?	(1)

International career
2006–2007	Slovakia	5	(0)

Managerial career
- 2018–2019: FK Kechnec
- 2020: FC Košice (caretaker)
- * Club domestic league appearances and goals

Peter Šinglár (born 24 July 1979) is a Slovak professional football manager and former player who is currently the assistant coach of Slovak First Football League club Košice.

Šinglár won the Czech First League with Slovan Liberec in 2006.

== Club career ==
=== Wisła Kraków ===
On 30 June 2008, Šinglár transferred to Polish club Wisla Kraków, signing a one-year contract. He made his debut in the Polish Ekstraklasa on 9 August 2008 in a match against Polonia Bytom. He scored his first and only competitive goal for Wisla on 5 April 2009 in a match against Lech Poznań. In June, he signed a contract extension with Wisla until 2011. In the summer of 2009, he tore his cruciate ligaments during a pre-match warm-up before a friendly match against SV Mattersburg. He missed the vast majority of the season due to treatment for the injury. He returned for the last match of the season, against Odra Wodzislaw, in which he assisted a goal for Patryk Małecki. On 31 August 2010, he terminated his contract with Wisla.

== Career statistics ==
=== Club ===
As of 18 February 2011

Appearances and goals by club, season and competition
Club	Season	League			National cup (Note: Includes Slovak Cup, Czech Cup, Polish Cup)		Europe		Total	
Club	Season	Division	Apps	Goals	Apps	Goals	Apps	Goals	Apps	Goals
Steel Trans Ličartovce	2001–02	2. Liga	15	0	1	1	—		16	1
Steel Trans Ličartovce	2002–03	2. Liga	24	3			—		24	3
Steel Trans Ličartovce	2003–04	2. Liga	29	0	6	0	—		35	0
Steel Trans Ličartovce	Total		68	3	7	1	—		75	4
ZTS Dubnica (loan)	2001–02	Slovak Superliga	17	2	—		—		17	2
Slovan Liberec	2004–05	Czech First League	29	1	5	0	8 (Note: Appearances in UEFA Intertoto Cup)	0	42	1
Slovan Liberec	2005–06	Czech First League	26	1	2	0	4	0	32	1
Slovan Liberec	2006–07	Czech First League	27	1	1	1	8 (Note: Two appearances in UEFA Champions League, six appearances in UEFA Cup)	0	36	2
Slovan Liberec	2007–08	Czech First League	23	0	2	0	0	0	25	0
Slovan Liberec	Total		105	3	10	1	20	0	135	4
Wisła Kraków	2008–09	Ekstraklasa	18	1	6	0	2 (Note: One appearance in UEFA Champions League, one appearance in UEFA Cup)	0	26	1
Wisła Kraków	2009–10	Ekstraklasa	2	0	0	0	0	0	2	0
Wisła Kraków	Total		20	1	6	0	2	0	28	1
MFK Košice	2010–11	Slovak Superliga	11	0	0	0	—		11	0
Career total			221	9	23	1	22	0	266	10

=== International ===
Appearances and goals by national team and year
National team	Year	Apps	Goals
Slovakia
Slovakia	2006	1	0
Slovakia	2007	4	0
Total		5	0

== Honours ==
Slovan Liberec

- Czech First League: 2005–06

Wisła Kraków

- Ekstraklasa: 2008–09

Košice

- Slovak Cup: 2013–14
