= Miroslav Viazanko =

Slovak footballer

Personal information
- Full name: Miroslav Viazanko
- Date of birth: 27 October 1981 (age 45)
- Place of birth: Prešov, Czechoslovakia
- Height: 1.74 m (5 ft 9 in)
- Position: Winger

Youth career
- Tatran Prešov

Senior career*
Years	Team	Apps	(Gls)
2001–2007	Tatran Prešov		
2008–2015	VSS Košice	223	(25)
2015–2019	Železiarne Podbrezová	101	(9)
- * Club domestic league appearances and goals

Miroslav Viazanko (born 27 October 1981) is a retired Slovak football winger.

== Club career ==
Viazanko played for MFK Košice in the Corgoň Liga. Košice finished 11th in the 2011–12 season. In the last match of that season he played at left back and captained the team.

== Career statistics ==
As of 4 January 2011

Club performance			League		Cup		Continental		Total	
Season	Club	League	Apps	Goals	Apps	Goals	Apps	Goals	Apps	Goals
Slovakia			League		Slovak Cup		Europe		Total	
2007–08	MFK Košice	Corgoň Liga	11	0	2	0	0	0	13	0
2008–09	MFK Košice	Corgoň Liga	30	2	6	0	0	0	36	2
2009–10	MFK Košice	Corgoň Liga	25	0	4	0	4	0	33	0
2010–11	MFK Košice	Corgoň Liga	16	2	1	0	0	0	17	2
Career total			82	4	13	0	4	0	99	4
