= 2013–14 FK Dukla Banská Bystrica season =

Dukla Banská Bystrica
2013–14 season
- Manager: Norbert Hrnčár
- Stadium: Štadión SNP
- Slovak First Football League: 8th
- Slovak Cup: Second round
- Top goalscorer: League: Pavol Jurčo; Fabián Slančík (8 each); All: Pavol Jurčo; Fabián Slančík (8 each)
- Highest home attendance: 3,390 v Slovan Bratislava (14 September 2013, Slovak First Football League)
- Lowest home attendance: 1,310 v Nitra (3 May 2014, Slovak First Football League)
- Average home league attendance: 1,938
- Biggest win: 4–0 v Myjava (Away, 12 July 2013, Slovak First Football League); 4–0 v Nitra (Home, 24 August 2013, Slovak First Football League); 4–0 v DAC Dunajská Streda (Home, 9 November 2013, Slovak First Football League)
- Biggest defeat: 0–4 v DAC Dunajská Streda (Away, 26 April 2014, Slovak First Football League); 0–4 v Spartak Trnava (Away, 10 May 2014, Slovak First Football League)

The 2013–14 season was Futbalový klub Dukla Banská Bystrica's 11th consecutive season in Slovak First Football League. In addition to the domestic league, Dukla Banská Bystrica participated in that season's editions of the Slovak Cup.

== Squad ==
Note: Flags indicate national team as defined under FIFA eligibility rules; some limited exceptions apply. Players may hold more than one non-FIFA nationality.

No.	Pos.	Nation	Player
1	GK	SVK	Dominik Rodinger
4	DF	SVK	Šimon Kupec
5	DF	SVK	Matej Podstavek
6	DF	SRB	Saša Savić
8	DF	SVK	Dionatan Teixeira
9	FW	SVK	Marek Šovčík
10	MF	SVK	Jakub Považanec
11	DF	SRB	Dušan Plavšić
13	GK	SVK	Peter Boroš
14	DF	ITA	Marco De Vito

No.	Pos.	Nation	Player
17	MF	CZE	Jan Kliment
18	MF	SVK	Martin Chrien
20	DF	SVK	Ján Nosko
22	FW	SVK	Fabián Slančík
23	MF	SVK	Michal Faško
24	MF	SVK	Jozef Rejdovian
26	FW	SVK	Michal Peňaška
27	DF	SVK	Patrik Vajda
30	MF	SVK	Branislav Ľupták
77	GK	SVK	Viktor Budinský

== Transfers ==
=== Summer ===
In: Note: Flags indicate national team as defined under FIFA eligibility rules; some limited exceptions apply. Players may hold more than one non-FIFA nationality.

No.	Pos.	Nation	Player
—	FW	SVK	Patrik Johancsik (loan return from FK DAC 1904 Dunajská Streda)
—	FW	SVK	Pavol Jurčo (on loan from MFK Zemplín Michalovce)
—	DF	SVK	Ján Nosko (on loan from ŽP Šport Podbrezová)
—	GK	CZE	Dominik Rodinger (on loan from (Czech Republic) FK Bohemians Prague)
—	MF	SVK	Jakub Hronec (on loan from MFK Dolný Kubín)
—	DF	SVK	Peter Chrappan (from (Malaysia) Selangor FA)
—	FW	SVK	Matúš Marcin (on loan from (Czech Republic) FC Vysočina Jihlava)
—	DF	ITA	Marco De Vito (from (Croatia) NK Imotski)

Out: Note: Flags indicate national team as defined under FIFA eligibility rules; some limited exceptions apply. Players may hold more than one non-FIFA nationality.

No.	Pos.	Nation	Player
3	MF	SVK	Tomáš Hučko (to MŠK Žilina)
4	DF	SVK	Martin Poljovka (End of professional career)
6	DF	SVK	Norbert Gyömbér (to (Italy) Calcio Catania)
14	MF	SVK	Michal Pančík (to ŽP Šport Podbrezová)
25	DF	SVK	Jozef Adámik (to FC Spartak Trnava)
28	FW	CZE	Pavel Vrána (End of contract)
33	MF	SVK	Marek Hlinka (to (Czech Republic) FK Dukla Prague)
—	FW	SVK	Patrik Johancsik (to (Austria) FC Stadlau)
—	DF	SVK	Peter Chrappan (on loan to FC ViOn Zlaté Moravce)
—	GK	SVK	Tomáš Belic (to FK DAC 1904 Dunajská Streda)

=== Winter ===
In: Note: Flags indicate national team as defined under FIFA eligibility rules; some limited exceptions apply. Players may hold more than one non-FIFA nationality.

No.	Pos.	Nation	Player
—	MF	CZE	Jan Kliment (on loan from (Czech Republic) FC Vysočina Jihlava)
—	DF	SRB	Dušan Plavšić (on loan from (Czech Republic) FC Vysočina Jihlava)
—	FW	CZE	David Střihavka (from (Lebanon) Al Ahed)

Out: Note: Flags indicate national team as defined under FIFA eligibility rules; some limited exceptions apply. Players may hold more than one non-FIFA nationality.

No.	Pos.	Nation	Player
—	GK	CZE	Dominik Rodinger (End of contract)
—	FW	SVK	Matúš Marcin (loan return to (Czech Republic) FC Vysočina Jihlava)
—	MF	SVK	Jakub Brašeň (Released)
—	DF	SVK	Matúš Turňa (Released)
—	FW	SVK	Pavol Jurčo (loan return to MFK Zemplín Michalovce and he signed contract with MŠK Žilina)
—	DF	SVK	Ivan Šnirc (on loan to FK DAC 1904 Dunajská Streda)

== Competitions ==
=== Overview ===
Competition	First match	Last match	Starting round	Final position	Record							
Competition	First match	Last match	Starting round	Final position	Pld	W	D	L	GF	GA	GD	Win %
Slovak First Football League	12 July 2013	31 May 2014	Matchday 1	8th	33	11	9	13	48	48	+0	33.33
Slovak Cup	27 August 2013	27 August 2013	Second round	Second round	1	0	1	0	0	0	+0	0.00
Total					34	11	10	13	48	48	+0	32.35

Source: Competitions

=== Slovak First Football League ===
==== League table ====
Pos	Team	Pld	W	D	L	GF	GA	GD	Pts
6	Senica	33	13	7	13	45	47	−2	46
7	Myjava	33	13	6	14	45	54	−9	45
8	Dukla Banská Bystrica	33	11	9	13	48	48	0	42
9	Žilina	33	11	7	15	49	50	−1	40
10	ViOn Zlaté Moravce	33	11	5	17	36	47	−11	38

Source: Niké liga (in Slovak)
Rules for classification: 1) points; 2) goal difference; 3) number of goals scored.

==== Results summary ====
Overall								Home						Away					
Pld	W	D	L	GF	GA	GD	Pts	W	D	L	GF	GA	GD	W	D	L	GF	GA	GD
33	11	9	13	48	48	0	42	7	5	4	30	19	+11	4	4	9	18	29	−11

Source: Corgoň Liga

==== Results by round ====
Round	1	2	3	4	5	6	7	8	9	10	11	12	13	14	15	16	17	18	19	20	21	22	23	24	25	26	27	28	29	30	31	32	33
Ground	A	H	A	H	A	A	H	A	H	A	H	H	A	H	A	H	H	A	H	A	H	A	A	H	A	H	A	A	H	A	H	A	H
Result	W	W	L	D	D	D	W	L	L	D	D	W	L	L	W	W	W	L	D	L	W	L	L	L	W	W	W	L	D	L	L	D	D
Position	2	1	4	4	6	6	5	6	7	7	8	7	8	9	8	7	6	8	7	7	6	7	8	9	8	8	6	7	7	8	8	8	8
Points	3	6	6	7	8	9	12	12	12	13	14	17	17	17	20	23	26	26	27	27	30	30	30	30	33	36	39	39	40	40	40	41	42

Source: Corgoň Liga
A = Away; H = Home; W = Win; D = Draw; L = Loss

==== Matches ====
12 July 2013 1	Myjava	0–4	Dukla Banská Bystrica	Myjava
20:00 CEST (UTC+2)	Kosík (yellow card) 47'	Report	Slančík 8', 57'; Podstavek (yellow card) 20'; Turňa (yellow card) 26'; Jurčo 40', 43'	Stadium: Stadium Myjava; Attendance: 2,112; Referee: Dušan Sedlák; Assistant referees: Dušan Kubačka, Peter Bednár

20 July 2013 2	Dukla Banská Bystrica	1–0	Košice	Banská Bystrica
19:30 CEST (UTC+2)	Jurčo 36', (yellow card) 58'; Savić (yellow card) 45'	Report	Šinglár (yellow card) 63'; Viazanko (yellow card) 71'	Stadium: Štadión SNP; Attendance: 2,642; Referee: Pavol Šuniar; Assistant referees: Roman Slyško, Dušan Petríček

27 July 2013 3	Ružomberok	2–1	Dukla Banská Bystrica	Ružomberok
18:30 CEST (UTC+2)	Lačný 41'; Adamović (yellow card) 56'; Almaský 75'; Janec (yellow card) 76'	Report	Nosko (yellow card) 53'; Jurčo 84'; Podstavek (yellow card) 89'	Stadium: Štadión MFK Ružomberok; Attendance: 2,621; Referee: Miroslav Jaška; Assistant referees: Ondrej Brendza, Rastislav Žákech

4 August 2013 4	Dukla Banská Bystrica	3–3	Žilina	Banská Bystrica
19:30 CEST (UTC+2)	Brašeň 53'; Nosko (yellow card) 57'; Považanec 70'; Slančík 78'; Chrien (yellow card) 87'	Report	Akakpo 14'; Bello 41'; Jelić (yellow card) 72'; Piaček (yellow card) 75'; Mabouka 77'	Stadium: Štadión SNP; Attendance: 3,080; Referee: Peter Kráľovič; Assistant referees: Milan Cuninka, Gabriel Ádám

10 August 2013 5	ViOn Zlaté Moravce	0–0	Dukla Banská Bystrica	Zlaté Moravce
19:30 CEST (UTC+2)	Candrák (yellow card) 35'	Report	Brašeň (yellow card) 52'; Ľupták (yellow card) 71'; Jurčo (yellow card) 86'	Stadium: Štadión FC ViOn; Attendance: 1,286; Referee: Pavol Šuniar; Assistant referees: Peter Jenčura, Peter Bóllo

17 August 2013 6	DAC Dunajská Streda	1–1	Dukla Banská Bystrica	Dunajská Streda
17:00 CEST (UTC+2)	Majerník (yellow card) 41'; Huber (yellow card) 45'; Mešanović 47'; Beňo (yellow card) 63'; Fodrek (yellow card) 72'; Velický (yellow card) 81'	Report	Ľupták 9'; Turňa (yellow card) 40'; Faško (yellow card) 52'; Nosko (yellow card) 70'; Teixeira (yellow card) 85'	Stadium: DAC Stadion; Attendance: 1,320; Referee: Richard Trutz; Assistant referees: Michal Tomčík, Juraj Lieskovský

24 August 2013 7	Dukla Banská Bystrica	4–0	Nitra	Banská Bystrica
19:30 CEST (UTC+2)	Podstavek 19'; Teixeira 24'; Považanec 60'; Jurčo (yellow card) 64'; Slančík 90'	Report	Barroso (yellow card) 29'; Cléber (yellow card) 45'; Kaspřák (yellow card) 62'; Turčák (yellow card) 78'	Stadium: Štadión SNP; Attendance: 2,027; Referee: Pavol Chmura; Assistant referees: Tomáš Mókoš, Milan Cuninka

31 August 2013 8	Spartak Trnava	2–1	Dukla Banská Bystrica	Trnava
17:00 CEST (UTC+2)	Maruško (yellow card) 73'; Vlasko 77', 88', (yellow card) 88'	Report	Jurčo 35'; Nosko (red card) 46'; Považanec (yellow card) 63'; Rodinger (yellow card) 66'	Stadium: Anton Malatinský Stadium; Attendance: 2,798; Referee: Mário Vlk; Assistant referees: Mária Súkeníková, Erik Weiss

14 September 2013 9	Dukla Banská Bystrica	2–4	Slovan Bratislava	Banská Bystrica
17:30 CEST (UTC+2)	Slančík 2', (yellow card) 87'; Jurčo 45'; Ľupták (yellow card) 45'	Report	Kladrubský 17'; Vittek 44'; Halenár 51'; Milinković (yellow card) 59'; Teixeira 71' (o.g.); Žofčák (yellow card) 72'; Vrablec (yellow card) 74'	Stadium: Štadión SNP; Attendance: 3,390; Referee: Peter Kráľovič; Assistant referees: Martin Balko, Rastislav Žákech

17 September 2013 10	Senica	1–1	Dukla Banská Bystrica	Senica
18:30 CEST (UTC+2)	Zeman 15'; Habánek (yellow card) 32'; Pavlík (yellow card) 66'	Report	Peňaška 29'; Ľupták (yellow card) 59'; Boroš (yellow card) 90'	Stadium: Štadión FK Senica; Attendance: 1,612; Referee: Martin Ježík; Assistant referees: Dušan Kubačka, Branislav Hancko

21 September 2013 11	Dukla Banská Bystrica	2–2	Trenčín	Banská Bystrica
17:30 CEST (UTC+2)	Peňaška 74'; Marcin 80'	Report	Malec 7'; Van Kessel 32'	Stadium: Štadión SNP; Attendance: 1,690; Referee: Jozef Pavlík; Assistant referees: Michal Tomčík, Dušan Hrčka

28 September 2013 12	Dukla Banská Bystrica	1–0	Myjava	Banská Bystrica
15:30 CEST (UTC+2)	Vajda 74'; Ľupták (yellow card) 78'	Report	Šulek (yellow card) 82'	Stadium: Štadión SNP; Attendance: 2,230; Referee: Ján Valášek; Assistant referees: Tomáš Mókoš, Martin Vindiš

5 October 2013 13	Košice	3–1	Dukla Banská Bystrica	Košice
14:30 CEST (UTC+2)	Sekulić (yellow card) 30'; Bašista (yellow card) 33'; Pačinda 52'; Duda 56'; Novák 69'	Report	Vajda 16'; Savić (yellow card) 29'; Chrien (yellow card) 38'; Slančík (red card) 45'	Stadium: Štadión Lokomotívy v Čermeli; Attendance: 1,930; Referee: Richard Trutz; Assistant referees: Roman Slyško, Michal Tomčík

19 October 2013 14	Dukla Banská Bystrica	0–1	Ružomberok	Banská Bystrica
17:30 CEST (UTC+2)	Ľupták (yellow card) 64'	Report	Adamović (yellow card) 10'; Tawamba 24'	Stadium: Štadión SNP; Attendance: 1,690; Referee: Július Straka; Assistant referees: Ondrej Brendza, Dušan Kubačka

26 October 2013 15	Žilina	1–2	Dukla Banská Bystrica	Žilina
17:30 CEST (UTC+2)	Majtán 7'; Dúbravka (yellow card) 68'	Report	Marcin 12'; Peňaška (yellow card) 51'; Brašeň 67'	Stadium: Štadión pod Dubňom; Attendance: 1,377; Referee: Ivan Kružliak; Assistant referees: Tomáš Somoláni, Martin Vindiš

2 November 2013 16	Dukla Banská Bystrica	2–1	ViOn Zlaté Moravce	Banská Bystrica
14:30 CET (UTC+1)	Marcin 43'; Jurčo 59'; Vajda (yellow card) 67'	Report	Pribula 62'; Bernáth (yellow card) 80'; Mazan (yellow card) 82'	Stadium: Štadión SNP; Attendance: 1,540; Referee: Martin Ježík; Assistant referees: Miroslav Benko, Gabriel Ádám

9 November 2013 17	Dukla Banská Bystrica	5–1	DAC Dunajská Streda	Banská Bystrica
14:30 CET (UTC+1)	Slančík 13'; Teixeira 38' (pen.); Vajda 63'; Považanec 77'; Jurčo 88'	Report	Hudák (yellow card) 11'; Pernecký (red card) 35'; Szarka (yellow card) 51', (goal) 60'; Majerník (yellow card) 70'; Matúš (yellow card) 86'	Stadium: Štadión SNP; Attendance: 1,490; Referee: Miroslav Jaška; Assistant referees: Ondrej Brendza, Marián Jankovič

23 November 2013 18	Nitra	2–0	Dukla Banská Bystrica	Nitra
14:30CET (UTC+1)	Bagi 11'; Cléber 49'; Boszorád (yellow card) 61'; Šimončič (yellow card) 90'	Report	Savić (yellow card) 36'; Turňa (yellow card) 57' (red card) 84'	Stadium: Štadión pod Zoborom; Attendance: 536; Referee: Richard Trutz; Assistant referees: Radomír Sluk, Erik Weiss

30 November 2013 19	Dukla Banská Bystrica	0–0	Spartak Trnava	Banská Bystrica
14:30 CET (UTC+1)	Považanec (yellow card) 56'; Chrien (yellow card) 78'	Report	Mikovič (yellow card) 40'; Janečka (yellow card) 57'; Kuzma (yellow card) 84'	Stadium: Štadión SNP; Attendance: 2,080; Referee: Ján Valášek; Assistant referees: Peter Chládek, Dušan Petríček

1 March 2014 20	Slovan Bratislava	2–0	Dukla Banská Bystrica	Bratislava
15:00 CET (UTC+1)	Soumah 10'; Kolčák (yellow card) 43'; Žofčák 59'	Report	Podstavek (yellow card) 69'	Stadium: Pasienky; Attendance: 1,918; Referee: Pavol Chmura; Assistant referees: Miroslav Benko, Gabriel Ádám

8 March 2014 21	Dukla Banská Bystrica	3–1	Senica	Banská Bystrica
15:00 CET (UTC+1)	Považanec 13', 75', (yellow card) 55'; Teixeira 58'	Report	Pavlík 20'; Mazáň (yellow card) 41'	Stadium: Štadión SNP; Attendance: 1,710; Referee: Ján Valášek; Assistant referees: Tomáš Mókoš, Dušan Petríček

17 March 2014 22	Trenčín	3–1	Dukla Banská Bystrica	Trenčín
18:30 CET (UTC+1)	Kleščík (yellow card) 71'; Bero 82'; Baéz 86'; Hajradinović 90'	Report	Chrien 36'; Rejdovian (yellow card) 37'; Savić (yellow card) 60'; Považanec (yellow card) 62'	Stadium: Štadión na Sihoti; Attendance: 2,652; Referee: Július Straka; Assistant referees: Tomáš Vorel, Gabriel Ádám

22 March 2014 23	Myjava	2–1	Dukla Banská Bystrica	Myjava
17:00 CET (UTC+1)	Kosík 7'; Daniel (yellow card) 77'; Urgela 81', (yellow card) 82'	Report	Chrien 65'	Stadium: Stadium Myjava; Attendance: 1,353; Referee: Michal Smolák; Assistant referees: Martin Balko, Dušan Petríček

29 March 2014 24	Dukla Banská Bystrica	0–1	Košice	Banská Bystrica
15:00 CET (UTC+1)	Savić (yellow card) 25'; Kliment (yellow card) 80'; Ľupták (yellow card) 83'; Šovčík (yellow card) 86'	Report	Kavka (yellow card) 45'; Šinglár 76', (yellow card) 81'; Diaby (yellow card) 90'	Stadium: Štadión SNP; Attendance: 1,490; Referee: Ladislav Prešinský; Assistant referees: Ondrej Brendza, Michal Tomčík

5 April 2014 25	Ružomberok	0–1	Dukla Banská Bystrica	Ružomberok
14:30 CEST (UTC+2)	Maslo (yellow card) 49'; Adamović (yellow card) 90'	Report	Slančík 4'; Chrien (yellow card) 14'; Ľupták (yellow card) 22'; Kliment (yellow card) 68'; Vajda (yellow card) 81'	Stadium: Štadión MFK Ružomberok; Attendance: 1,803; Referee: Roland Weiss; Assistant referees: Roman Slyško, Miroslav Benko

14 April 2014 26	Dukla Banská Bystrica	4–1	Žilina	Banská Bystrica
18:30 CEST (UTC+2)	Střihavka 23'; Ľupták (yellow card) 62'; Slančík 67'; Považanec 70'; Rejdovian 86'	Report	Jurčo 42' (pen.)	Stadium: Štadión SNP; Attendance: 1,340; Referee: Martin Ježík; Assistant referees: Rastislav Žákech, Marián Jankovič

20 April 2014 27	ViOn Zlaté Moravce	1–3	Dukla Banská Bystrica	Zlaté Moravce
18:30 CEST (UTC+2)	Bolinha (yellow card) 41'; Majerník (yellow card) 46'; Szabó 71'	Report	Chrien 6', 51'; Nosko (yellow card) 17'; Ľupták (yellow card) 64', (goal) 78'	Stadium: Štadión FC ViOn; Attendance: 2,012; Referee: Miroslav Jaška; Assistant referees: Mário Roszbeck, Dušan Kubačka

26 April 2014 28	DAC Dunajská Streda	4–0	Dukla Banská Bystrica	Dunajská Streda
19:00 CEST (UTC+2)	Matúš 1'; Nosko 5' (o.g.); Gergel 53'; N'Guekam 80'	Report	Nosko (yellow card) 4'; Peňaška (yellow card) 46'; Podstavek (yellow card) 72'	Stadium: DAC Stadion; Attendance: 4,578; Referee: Gabriel Michlian; Assistant referees: Peter Chládek, František Ferenc

3 May 2014 29	Dukla Banská Bystrica	0–0	Nitra	Banská Bystrica
17:30 CEST (UTC+2)	Podstavek (red card) 59'; Boroš (yellow card) 59'	Report	Boszorád (yellow card) 55'; Mikuš (yellow card) 71'; Böhm (yellow card) 73'	Stadium: Štadión SNP; Attendance: 1,310; Referee: Dušan Sedlák; Assistant referees: Martin Borsányi, Radoslav Bobko

10 May 2014 30	Spartak Trnava	4–0	Dukla Banská Bystrica	Trnava
16:30 CEST (UTC+2)	Sabo 7' (pen.); Vlasko (yellow card) 39'; Schranz 45', 67'; Savić 52' (o.g.)	Report	Boroš (yellow card) 6'; Ľupták (yellow card) 75'	Stadium: Anton Malatinský Stadium; Attendance: 3,010; Referee: Jozef Pavlík; Assistant referees: Juraj Lieskovský, Mário Roszbeck

17 May 2014 31	Dukla Banská Bystrica	1–2	Slovan Bratislava	Banská Bystrica
17:30 CEST (UTC+2)	Šovčík 25'; Nosko (yellow card) 43'; Vajda (yellow card) 44'; Rejdovian (yellow card) 88'	Report	Gorosito (yellow card) 41'; Gašparovič 66'; Vrablec (yellow card) 77'; Fořt 83'	Stadium: Štadión SNP; Attendance: 1,442; Referee: Peter Kráľovič; Assistant referees: Miroslav Benko, Branislav Hancko

20 May 2014 32	Senica	1–1	Dukla Banská Bystrica	Senica
17:30 CEST (UTC+2)	Kalabiška 77' (pen.)	Report	Peňaška 3'; Podstavek (yellow card) 51'; Nosko (yellow card) 76'	Stadium: Štadión FK Senica; Attendance: 1,058; Referee: Štefan Leško; Assistant referees: Radomír Sluk, Martin Špivák

31 May 2014 33	Dukla Banská Bystrica	2–2	Trenčín	Banská Bystrica
17:30 CEST (UTC+2)	Vajda (yellow card) 23', (goal) 72'; Ľupták (yellow card) 31'; Savić (yellow card) 63'; Střihavka 87'	Report	Bero 20'; Čögley (yellow card) 71'; Simon 90'	Stadium: Štadión SNP; Attendance: 1,861; Referee: Ivan Kružliak; Assistant referees: Dušan Kubačka, Martin Špivák

=== Slovak Cup ===
27 August 2013 Second round	Dukla Banská Bystrica	0–0 (3–4 p)	Tatran Liptovský Mikuláš	Banská Bystrica
17:30 CEST (UTC+2)	Jurčo (penalty missed) 54'; Ľupták (yellow card) 68'	Report	Lišivka (yellow card) 53'; Kucharčík (yellow card) 64'	Stadium: Štadión SNP; Attendance: 1,504; Referee: Roland Weiss; Assistant referees: Erik Weiss, Martin Špivák
Note: Tatran Liptovský Mikuláš won 4–3 on penalties.
