= 2013–14 MFK Ružomberok season =

Ružomberok
2013–14 season
- Owner: Milan Fiľo
- Manager: Ladislav Šimčo (until 26 May 2013); Jozef Vukušič (from 12 June 2013)
- Stadium: Štadión MFK Ružomberok
- Slovak First Football League: 4th
- Slovak Cup: Semi-finals
- Top goalscorer: League: Léandre Tawamba (13); All: Léandre Tawamba (14)
- Highest home attendance: 4,675 v Slovan Bratislava (10 November 2013, Slovak First Football League)
- Lowest home attendance: 1,018 v Spartak Myjava (17 May 2014, Slovak First Football League)
- Average home league attendance: 2,331
- Biggest win: 5–0 v Spartak Myjava (Home, 17 May 2014, Slovak First Football League)
- Biggest defeat: 0–3 v Spartak Myjava (Home, 14 September 2013, Slovak First Football League); 0–3 v Košice (Home, 8 March 2014, Slovak First Football League); 1–4 v Košice (Away, 15 April 2014, Slovak Cup); 0–3 v Trenčín (Away, 10 May 2014, Slovak First Football League)

The 2013–14 season was Mestský Futbalový klub Ružomberok's 17th consecutive season in Slovak First Football League. In addition to the domestic league, Ružomberok participated in this season's editions of Slovak Cup.

== Squad ==
Note: Flags indicate national team as defined under FIFA eligibility rules; some limited exceptions apply. Players may hold more than one non-FIFA nationality.

| No. | Pos. | Nation | Player |
|---|---|---|---|
| 1 | GK | SVK | Lukáš Zich |
| 3 | MF | CMR | Léandre Tawamba |
| 6 | DF | SVK | Lukáš Greššák |
| 7 | MF | SVK | Mário Almaský |
| 8 | MF | SVK | Tomáš Gerát |
| 9 | FW | SVK | Adam Zreľák |
| 10 | MF | SVK | Martin Nagy |
| 11 | FW | SVK | Andrej Lovás |
| 13 | MF | SVK | Juraj Vavrík |
| 14 | MF | SVK | Lukáš Lupták |
| 16 | DF | SVK | Lukáš Ondrek |
| 17 | DF | SVK | Peter Maslo |
| 18 | MF | SVK | Štefan Zošák |

| No. | Pos. | Nation | Player |
|---|---|---|---|
| 19 | DF | BIH | Adi Mehremić |
| 20 | MF | SVK | Richard Bartoš |
| 21 | DF | SVK | Oliver Práznovský |
| 23 | MF | SVK | Ivan Kotora |
| 24 | DF | SVK | Martin Nosek |
| 25 | FW | SVK | Filip Serečin |
| 26 | MF | SVK | Tomáš Ďubek (captain) |
| 30 | GK | SVK | Pavel Kováč |
| 33 | GK | SVK | Tomas Pazitka |
| 35 | GK | SRB | Milorad Nikolić |
| 42 | DF | SRB | Goran Adamović |
| — | DF | SVK | Matúš Čonka |

== Transfers ==
=== Summer ===
In: Note: Flags indicate national team as defined under FIFA eligibility rules; some limited exceptions apply. Players may hold more than one non-FIFA nationality.

| No. | Pos. | Nation | Player |
|---|---|---|---|
| — | FW | SVK | Štefan Gerec (loan return from FK DAC 1904 Dunajská Streda) |
| — | MF | SVK | Tomáš Gerát (loan return from FK DAC 1904 Dunajská Streda) |
| — | DF | SVK | Michal Kutlík (loan return from FK DAC 1904 Dunajská Streda) |
| — | DF | SVK | Jaroslav Kostelný (loan return from (Czech Republic) SFC Opava) |
| — | MF | SVK | Štefan Zošák (from MŠK Žilina) |
| — | MF | CMR | Léandre Tawamba (from FC Nitra) |
| — | DF | SRB | Goran Adamović (from (Serbia) FK Spartak Zlatibor Voda) |
| — | GK | SRB | Milorad Nikolić (from (Serbia) FK Javor Ivanjica) |
| — | DF | SVK | Michal Janec (on loan from (Czech Republic) FC Slovan Liberec) |
| — | FW | SVK | Miloš Lačný (from Free Agent) |
| — | DF | BIH | Adi Mehremić (from (Bosnia and Herzegovina) FK Olimpic) |

Out: Note: Flags indicate national team as defined under FIFA eligibility rules; some limited exceptions apply. Players may hold more than one non-FIFA nationality.

| No. | Pos. | Nation | Player |
|---|---|---|---|
| 1 | GK | CZE | Lukáš Zich (to TBA) |
| 5 | MF | SVK | Lukáš Bielák (to (Poland) Bogdanka Łęczna) |
| 8 | DF | SVK | Martin Jurkemik (End of contract) |
| 15 | DF | SVK | Jakub Janso (End of contract) |
| 19 | MF | SVK | Štefan Pekár (to Spartak Myjava) |
| 22 | FW | COD | Mulumba Mukendi (to (Russia) FC Volga Nizhny Novgorod) |

=== Winter ===
In: Note: Flags indicate national team as defined under FIFA eligibility rules; some limited exceptions apply. Players may hold more than one non-FIFA nationality.

| No. | Pos. | Nation | Player |
|---|---|---|---|
| — | MF | SVK | Július Szöke (on loan from ŽP Šport Podbrezová) |

Out: Note: Flags indicate national team as defined under FIFA eligibility rules; some limited exceptions apply. Players may hold more than one non-FIFA nationality.

| No. | Pos. | Nation | Player |
|---|---|---|---|
| — | GK | SVK | Tomáš Lešňovský (Released) |
| — | DF | SVK | Michal Janec (loan return to (Czech Republic) FC Slovan Liberec) |
| — | DF | BIH | Adi Mehremić (Released) |
| — | FW | SVK | Miloš Lačný (to (Kazakhstan) FC Kairat) |

== Competitions ==
=== Overview ===
| Competition | First match | Last match | Starting round | Final position | Record | | | | | | | |
| Competition | First match | Last match | Starting round | Final position | Pld | W | D | L | GF | GA | GD | Win % |
|---|---|---|---|---|---|---|---|---|---|---|---|---|
| Slovak First Football League | 14 July 2013 | 31 May 2014 | Matchday 1 | 4th | 33 | 15 | 5 | 13 | 56 | 51 | +5 | 45.45 |
| Slovak Cup | 27 August 2013 | 15 April 2014 | Second round | Semi-finals | 6 | 2 | 2 | 2 | 8 | 7 | +1 | 33.33 |
| Total | | | | | 39 | 17 | 7 | 15 | 64 | 58 | +6 | 43.59 |

Source: Competitions

=== Slovak First Football League ===
==== League table ====
| Pos | Team | Pld | W | D | L | GF | GA | GD | Pts | Qualification or relegation |
|---|---|---|---|---|---|---|---|---|---|---|
| 2 | Trenčín | 33 | 19 | 6 | 8 | 74 | 35 | +39 | 63 | Qualification for Europa League second qualifying round |
| 3 | Spartak Trnava | 33 | 16 | 5 | 12 | 47 | 42 | +5 | 53 | Qualification for Europa League first qualifying round |
| 4 | Ružomberok | 33 | 15 | 5 | 13 | 56 | 51 | +5 | 50 | |
| 5 | Košice | 33 | 13 | 7 | 13 | 41 | 40 | +1 | 46 | Qualification for Europa League second qualifying round (Note: 2013–14 Slovak Cup winners Košice qualified for the second qualifying round of the 2014–15 UEFA Europa League.) |
| 6 | Senica | 33 | 13 | 7 | 13 | 45 | 47 | −2 | 46 | |

Source: Niké liga (in Slovak)
Rules for classification: 1) points; 2) goal difference; 3) number of goals scored.

==== Results summary ====
| Overall | | | | | | | | Home | | | | | | Away | | | | | |
| Pld | W | D | L | GF | GA | GD | Pts | W | D | L | GF | GA | GD | W | D | L | GF | GA | GD |
|---|---|---|---|---|---|---|---|---|---|---|---|---|---|---|---|---|---|---|---|
| 33 | 15 | 5 | 13 | 56 | 51 | +5 | 50 | 7 | 3 | 7 | 28 | 26 | +2 | 8 | 2 | 6 | 28 | 25 | +3 |

Source: Corgoň Liga

==== Results by round ====
| Round | 1 | 2 | 3 | 4 | 5 | 6 | 7 | 8 | 9 | 10 | 11 | 12 | 13 | 14 | 15 | 16 | 17 | 18 | 19 | 20 | 21 | 22 | 23 | 24 | 25 | 26 | 27 | 28 | 29 | 30 | 31 | 32 | 33 |
|---|---|---|---|---|---|---|---|---|---|---|---|---|---|---|---|---|---|---|---|---|---|---|---|---|---|---|---|---|---|---|---|---|---|
| Ground | H | A | H | A | H | A | H | A | H | A | H | A | H | A | H | A | H | A | H | A | H | A | H | A | H | A | H | A | H | A | H | A | H |
| Result | D | W | W | D | W | L | D | W | L | D | W | W | L | W | W | W | L | L | L | W | L | L | W | L | L | L | L | W | D | L | W | W | W |
| Position | 5 | 2 | 1 | 2 | 1 | 3 | 7 | 4 | 5 | 5 | 5 | 2 | 3 | 3 | 2 | 2 | 2 | 3 | 3 | 3 | 3 | 4 | 3 | 3 | 6 | 7 | 8 | 6 | 6 | 7 | 6 | 4 | 4 |
| Points | 1 | 4 | 7 | 8 | 11 | 11 | 12 | 15 | 15 | 16 | 19 | 22 | 22 | 25 | 28 | 31 | 31 | 31 | 31 | 34 | 34 | 34 | 37 | 37 | 37 | 37 | 37 | 40 | 41 | 41 | 44 | 47 | 50 |

Source: Corgoň Liga
A = Away; H = Home; W = Win; D = Draw; L = Loss

==== Matches ====
| 14 July 2013 1 | Ružomberok | 2–2 | Žilina | Ružomberok |
| 18:30 CEST (UTC+2) | Ďubek 12'; Tawamba 90' | Report | Pečovský 37'; Pich 49'; Piaček (yellow card) 90' | Stadium: Štadión MFK Ružomberok; Attendance: 3,027; Referee: Richard Trutz; Assistant referees: Martin Balko, Miroslav Benko |

| 19 July 2013 2 | ViOn Zlaté Moravce | 1–3 | Ružomberok | Zlaté Moravce |
| 19:30 CEST (UTC+2) | Nurković 10', (yellow card) 31'; Pavlenda (yellow card) 90' | Report | Ďubek 41', 47'; Tawamba 43' | Stadium: Štadión FC ViOn; Attendance: 1,224; Referee: Vladimír Vnuk; Assistant referees: Miroslav Benko, Peter Chládek |

| 27 July 2013 3 | Ružomberok | 2–1 | Dukla Banská Bystrica | Ružomberok |
| 18:30 CEST (UTC+2) | Lačný 41'; Adamović (yellow card) 56'; Almaský 75'; Janec (yellow card) 76' | Report | Nosko (yellow card) 53'; Jurčo 84'; Podstavek (yellow card) 89' | Stadium: Štadión MFK Ružomberok; Attendance: 2,621; Referee: Miroslav Jaška; Assistant referees: Ondrej Brendza, Rastislav Žákech |

| 2 August 2013 4 | Nitra | 3–3 | Ružomberok | Nitra |
| 19:30 CEST (UTC+2) | Boszorád (yellow card) 17'; Cléber 33', 62' (pen.), (yellow card) 36'; Benčík (yellow card) 58'; Turčák 70' | Report | Lačný 27', (yellow card) 27'; Tawamba 45'; Adamović (yellow card) 62'; Ďubek (yellow card) 64'; Mičic 90' (o.g.) | Stadium: Štadión pod Zoborom; Attendance: 1,170; Referee: Ivan Kružliak; Assistant referees: Martin Balko, Tomáš Somoláni |

| 10 August 2013 5 | Ružomberok | 3–2 | Spartak Trnava | Ružomberok |
| 18:00 CEST (UTC+2) | Lačný (yellow card) 6' (red card) 17'; Adamović (yellow card) 36'; Ďubek (yellow card) 39'; Tawamba 40', 84'; Greššák (yellow card) 42'; Maslo 58' | Report | Grabež (yellow card) 34'; E. Sabo 47'; Chovanec 60' | Stadium: Štadión MFK Ružomberok; Attendance: 3,572; Referee: Štefan Leško; Assistant referees: Tomáš Vorel, Dušan Hrčka |

| 18 August 2013 6 | Slovan Bratislava | 3–2 | Ružomberok | Bratislava |
| 19:00 CEST (UTC+2) | Fořt 14'; Žofčák 41'; Halenár 49' | Report | Zošák (yellow card) 5'; Ďubek 63'; Tawamba 79' | Stadium: Pasienky; Attendance: 4,133; Referee: Miroslav Jaška; Assistant referees: Dušan Kubačka, Gabriel Ádám |

| 24 August 2013 7 | Ružomberok | 1–1 | Senica | Ružomberok |
| 17:30 CEST (UTC+2) | Nagy (yellow card) 54'; Janec (yellow card) 64'; Zreľák 79'; Lačný (yellow card) 87' | Report | Piroska (yellow card) 20', (goal) 35'; Diviš (yellow card) 22'; Šulla (yellow card) 56'; Zeman (yellow card) 90' | Stadium: Štadión MFK Ružomberok; Attendance: 3,082; Referee: Richard Trutz; Assistant referees: Peter Chládek, Martin Špivák |

| 31 August 2013 8 | Trenčín | 0–1 | Ružomberok | Trenčín |
| 17:30 CEST (UTC+2) | Baéz (yellow card) 22'; Hajradinović (yellow card) 31' | Report | Tawamba 19'; Zošák (yellow card) 27'; Nikolić (yellow card) 90' | Stadium: Štadión na Sihoti; Attendance: 2,168; Referee: Július Straka; Assistant referees: Ondrej Brendza, Dušan Hrčka |

| 14 September 2013 9 | Ružomberok | 0–3 | Spartak Myjava | Ružomberok |
| 17:30 CEST (UTC+2) | | Report | Pellegrini 6', (yellow card) 51'; Kosík 54', 81' | Stadium: Štadión MFK Ružomberok; Attendance: 2,356; Referee: Pavol Šuniar; Assistant referees: Martin Vindiš, Dušan Petríček |

| 17 September 2013 10 | Košice | 2–2 | Ružomberok | Košice |
| 15:30 CEST (UTC+2) | Duda 2', (yellow card) 38'; Kavka (yellow card) 29'; Sekulić (yellow card) 45'; Diaby (yellow card) 56'; Hovančík (yellow card) 57' (red card) 74'; Haskić 73', (yellow card) 83' | Report | Nikolić (red card) 20'; Lačný 58'; Ďubek (yellow card) 61'; Zreľák (yellow card) 71'; Tawamba 90' | Stadium: Štadión Lokomotívy v Čermeli; Attendance: 1,220; Referee: Miroslav Jaška; Assistant referees: Radomír Sluk, František Ferenc |

| 21 September 2013 11 | Ružomberok | 2–0 | DAC Dunajská Streda | Ružomberok |
| 17:30 CEST (UTC+2) | Nosek 37'; Lačný 42' | Report | Gašparík (yellow card) 29'; Mešanović (yellow card) 45'; Kwin (yellow card) 59' | Stadium: Štadión MFK Ružomberok; Attendance: 1,874; Referee: Mário Vlk; Assistant referees: Peter Chládek, Marián Jankovič |

| 28 September 2013 12 | Žilina | 2–3 | Ružomberok | Žilina |
| 17:30 CEST (UTC+2) | Mihalík 32'; Majtán (yellow card) 77'; Pečovský 90' | Report | Ďubek 45'; Lačný 68'; Zreľák 84' | Stadium: Štadión pod Dubňom; Attendance: 1,826; Referee: Patrik Hrčka; Assistant referees: Milan Cuninka, Radoslav Bobko |

| 5 October 2013 13 | Ružomberok | 1–3 | ViOn Zlaté Moravce | Ružomberok |
| 14:30 CEST (UTC+2) | Tawamba 37'; Greššák (yellow card) 63' | Report | Obročník 18'; Babic 20'; Chrappan (yellow card) 42'; Orávik 45', (yellow card) 69'; L. Szabó (yellow card) 70' | Stadium: Štadión MFK Ružomberok; Attendance: 1,790; Referee: Michal Smolák; Assistant referees: Karol Poláček, Juraj Lieskovský |

| 19 October 2013 14 | Dukla Banská Bystrica | 0–1 | Ružomberok | Banská Bystrica |
| 17:30 CEST (UTC+2) | Ľupták (yellow card) 64' | Report | Adamović (yellow card) 10'; Tawamba 24' | Stadium: Štadión SNP; Attendance: 1,690; Referee: Július Straka; Assistant referees: Ondrej Brendza, Dušan Kubačka |

| 26 October 2013 15 | Ružomberok | 4–0 | Nitra | Ružomberok |
| 14:30 CEST (UTC+2) | Lačný 15', 31', 49'; Zreľák 20' | Report | Kotrík (yellow card) 77'; Turčák (yellow card) 79' | Stadium: Štadión MFK Ružomberok; Attendance: 1,917; Referee: Dušan Sedlák; Assistant referees: Peter Bednár, Peter Jenčura |

| 2 November 2013 16 | Spartak Trnava | 1–4 | Ružomberok | Trnava |
| 14:00 CET (UTC+1) | Adámik 9', (yellow card) 82'; Ciprys (yellow card) 44'; Janečka (yellow card) 47' | Report | Lačný 16', 51', (yellow card) 44'; Ďubek 63'; Lupták 88'; Tawamba (yellow card) 90' | Stadium: Anton Malatinský Stadium; Attendance: 2,635; Referee: Vladimír Vnuk; Assistant referees: Peter Chládek, Tomáš Vorel |

| 10 November 2013 17 | Ružomberok | 2–3 | Slovan Bratislava | Ružomberok |
| 14:30 CET (UTC+1) | Lačný 53'; Ďubek (yellow card) 76', (goal) 84' (pen.) | Report | Vittek 20', 69'; Žofčák 36', (yellow card) 70'; Grendel (yellow card) 44'; Kladrubský (yellow card) 76'; Milinković (yellow card) 77'; Gorosito (yellow card) 83' | Stadium: Štadión MFK Ružomberok; Attendance: 4,675; Referee: Mário Vlk; Assistant referees: Erik Weiss, Martin Vindiš |

| 23 November 2013 18 | Senica | 2–1 | Ružomberok | Senica |
| 13:30 CET (UTC+1) | Hiago 7', 65' | Report | Pavlík 20' (o.g.); Adamović (yellow card) 83' | Stadium: Štadión FK Senica; Attendance: 1,460; Referee: Jozef Pavlík; Assistant referees: Martin Vindiš, Milan Cuninka |

| 30 November 2013 19 | Ružomberok | 1–2 | Trenčín | Ružomberok |
| 14:30 CET (UTC+1) | Lačný (yellow card) 35'; Tawamba 60'; Adamović (yellow card) 65' | Report | Baéz (yellow card) 32'; Mondek 52'; Rundić (yellow card) 71'; Malec 85' | Stadium: Štadión MFK Ružomberok; Attendance: 1,906; Referee: Michal Smolák; Assistant referees: Ondrej Brendza, Radoslav Bobko |

| 1 March 2014 20 | Spartak Myjava | 0–3 | Ružomberok | Myjava |
| 17:00 CET (UTC+1) | | Report | Zošák 18'; Almaský 44'; Bartoš (yellow card) 49'; Zreľák 65' | Stadium: Stadium Myjava; Attendance: 1,730; Referee: Patrik Hrčka; Assistant referees: Tomáš Vorel, Peter Bednár |

| 8 March 2014 21 | Ružomberok | 0–3 | Košice | Ružomberok |
| 15:00 CET (UTC+1) | | Report | Korijkov (yellow card) 17'; Diaby 37', 43'; Kavka (yellow card) 49'; Viazanko (yellow card) 82'; Novák 83' | Stadium: Štadión MFK Ružomberok; Attendance: 2,346; Referee: Mário Vlk; Assistant referees: Rastislav Žákech, Mário Roszbeck |

| 15 March 2014 22 | DAC Dunajská Streda | 2–0 | Ružomberok | Dunajská Streda |
| 18:00 CET (UTC+1) | Straka (yellow card) 32'; Ujlaky 35'; Szarka (yellow card) 44'; Turňa (yellow card) 45'; Krišto (yellow card) 63'; Čaušić 66' | Report | Lovás (yellow card) 83'; Ďubek (yellow card) 90' | Stadium: DAC Stadion; Attendance: 3,728; Referee: Ivan Kružliak; Assistant referees: Peter Chládek, Peter Bóllo |

| 22 March 2014 23 | Ružomberok | 3–2 | Žilina | Ružomberok |
| 15:00 CET (UTC+1) | Zošák (yellow card) 3'; Lovás 24'; Tawamba 35'; Ďubek 47'; Kováč (yellow card) 89' | Report | Jurčo 6'; Káčer 75' | Stadium: Štadión MFK Ružomberok; Attendance: 2,416; Referee: Miroslav Jaška; Assistant referees: Peter Bednár, František Ferenc |

| 29 March 2014 24 | ViOn Zlaté Moravce | 1–0 | Ružomberok | Zlaté Moravce |
| 17:30 CET (UTC+1) | Babic 46'; Chren (yellow card) 78' | Report | Adamović (yellow card) 13'; Greššák (yellow card) 45'; Zošák (yellow card) 85'; Tawamba (yellow card) 90' | Stadium: Štadión FC ViOn; Attendance: 1,864; Referee: Richard Trutz; Assistant referees: Henrich Mikulaj, Martin Borsányi |

| 5 April 2014 25 | Ružomberok | 0–1 | Dukla Banská Bystrica | Ružomberok |
| 14:30 CEST (UTC+2) | Maslo (yellow card) 49'; Adamović (yellow card) 90' | Report | Slančík 4'; Chrien (yellow card) 14'; Ľupták (yellow card) 22'; Kliment (yellow card) 68'; Vajda (yellow card) 81' | Stadium: Štadión MFK Ružomberok; Attendance: 1,803; Referee: Roland Weiss; Assistant referees: Roman Slyško, Miroslav Benko |

| 12 April 2014 26 | Nitra | 3–1 | Ružomberok | Nitra |
| 17:30 CEST (UTC+2) | Pillár 21', 58'; Špalek (yellow card) 60'; Mikuš 74' | Report | Kotora 59'; Ďubek (yellow card) 61'; Nosek (yellow card) 89' | Stadium: Štadión pod Zoborom; Attendance: 1,030; Referee: Pavol Chmura; Assistant referees: Peter Chládek, Dušan Petríček |

| 20 April 2014 27 | Ružomberok | 0–2 | Spartak Trnava | Ružomberok |
| 17:30 CEST (UTC+2) | Bartoš (yellow card) 29'; Maslo (yellow card) 32'; Lovás (yellow card) 62' | Report | Chovanec 10'; Kuzma (yellow card) 44'; Grabež (yellow card) 61'; Tóth (yellow card) 78'; Mikovič 89' | Stadium: Štadión MFK Ružomberok; Attendance: 2,403; Referee: Vladimír Vnuk; Assistant referees: Dušan Hrčka, Martin Borsányi |

| 26 April 2014 28 | Slovan Bratislava | 1–2 | Ružomberok | Bratislava |
| 15:00 CEST (UTC+2) | Mészáros (yellow card) 69'; Halenár 87' (pen.) | Report | Bartoš 3'; Ďubek 28'; Lupták (yellow card) 75'; Nikolić (yellow card) 85' | Stadium: Pasienky; Attendance: 1,123; Referee: Patrik Hrčka; Assistant referees: Radomír Sluk, Juraj Lieskovský |

| 3 May 2014 29 | Ružomberok | 0–0 | Senica | Ružomberok |
| 17:30 CEST (UTC+2) | Maslo (yellow card) 18'; Zreľák (yellow card) 86' | Report | Gava (yellow card) 40'; Pavlík (red card) 57' | Stadium: Štadión MFK Ružomberok; Attendance: 1,311; Referee: Pavol Šuniar; Assistant referees: Martin Balko, Henrich Mikulaj |

| 10 May 2014 30 | Trenčín | 3–0 | Ružomberok | Trenčín |
| 15:00 CEST (UTC+2) | Hajradinović (yellow card) 3'; Rundić 6'; Van Kessel 35'; Baéz (yellow card) 77'; Bero 89' | Report | Bartoš (yellow card) 13'; Lovás (yellow card) 56' | Stadium: Štadión na Sihoti; Attendance: 2,552; Referee: Roland Weiss; Assistant referees: Tomáš Somoláni, František Ferenc |

| 17 May 2014 31 | Ružomberok | 5–0 | Spartak Myjava | Ružomberok |
| 17:30 CEST (UTC+2) | Zreľák 34', 49', 72'; Bartoš 44'; Almaský 52'; Maslo (yellow card) 60' | Report | Černáček (yellow card) 74' | Stadium: Štadión MFK Ružomberok; Attendance: 1,018; Referee: Dušan Sedlák; Assistant referees: Tomáš Vorel, Peter Bednár |

| 20 May 2014 32 | Košice | 1–2 | Ružomberok | Košice |
| 17:30 CEST (UTC+2) | Skvašík 17' | Report | Almaský 7'; Maslo (yellow card) 21'; Kováč (red card) 36'; Zreľák 66' | Stadium: Štadión Lokomotívy v Čermeli; Attendance: 1,550; Referee: Vladimír Hracho; Assistant referees: Juraj Lieskovský, Martin Vindiš |

| 31 May 2014 33 | Ružomberok | 2–1 | DAC Dunajská Streda | Ružomberok |
| 17:30 CEST (UTC+2) | Tawamba 33'; Ďubek 66' | Report | Turňa (yellow card) 32'; Čaušić 56'; Straka (yellow card) 58' | Stadium: Štadión MFK Ružomberok; Attendance: 1,507; Referee: Ľubomír Samotný; Assistant referees: Peter Bóllo, Martin Borsányi |

=== Slovak Cup ===
| 27 August 2013 Second round | Podbrezová | 0–3 | Ružomberok | Podbrezová |
| 17:00 CEST (UTC+2) | Očenáš (yellow card) 77' | Report | Adamović 51'; Nagy (yellow card) 72'; Bartoš 78'; Tawamba (yellow card) 81', (goal) 84' | Stadium: Stadium Kolkáreň; Attendance: 1,150; Referee: Peter Kráľovič; Assistant referees: Radomír Sluk, Miroslav Benko |

| 24 September 2013 Third round | Ružomberok | 0–0 (5–4 p) | Zemplín Michalovce | Ružomberok |
| 16:30 CEST (UTC+2) | Ďubek (yellow card) 12' | Report | | Stadium: Štadión MFK Ružomberok; Attendance: 1,212; Referee: Vladimír Hracho; Assistant referees: Radomír Sluk, Milan Cuninka |
Note: Ružomberok won 5–4 on penalties.

| 22 October 2013 Quarter-finals First leg | Spartak Trnava | 1–3 | Ružomberok | Trnava |
| 15:00 CEST (UTC+2) | E. Sabo 14'; Vlasko (yellow card) 72' | Report | Adamović (yellow card) 11'; Janečka 38' (o.g.); Nosek (yellow card) 60'; Lačný 82', 89'; Zošák (yellow card) 88' | Stadium: Anton Malatinský Stadium; Attendance: 1,256; Referee: Jozef Pavlík; Assistant referees: Mário Roszbeck, Marián Jankovič; Fourth official: Marek Špaček |

| 5 November 2013 Quarter-finals Second leg | Ružomberok | 1–2 (4–3 agg.) | Spartak Trnava | Ružomberok |
| 16:30 CET (UTC+1) | Zošák 10'; Tawamba (yellow card) 75'; Nikolić (red card) 90' | Report | Nworah (yellow card) 19'; Banovič 74'; E. Sabo 90' | Stadium: Štadión MFK Ružomberok; Attendance: 1,812; Referee: Miroslav Fajčík; Assistant referees: Radomír Sluk, Martin Špivák; Fourth official: Ľubomír Samotný |
Note: Ružomberok won 4–3 on aggregate.

| 8 April 2014 Semi-finals First leg | Ružomberok | 0–0 | Košice | Ružomberok |
| 16:30 CEST (UTC+2) | Lovás (yellow card) 32'; Zošák (yellow card) 43' | Report | Pačinda (yellow card) 40'; Viazanko (yellow card) 76' | Stadium: Štadión MFK Ružomberok; Attendance: 1,513; Referee: Ivan Kružliak; Assistant referees: Tomáš Somoláni, Radomír Sluk; Fourth official: Tomáš Vorel |

| 15 April 2014 Semi-finals Second leg | Košice | 4–1 (4–1 agg.) | Ružomberok | Košice |
| 16:30 CEST (UTC+2) | Diaby 56'; Novák 73', 84'; Pačinda (yellow card) 78'; Bašista 78' | Report | Lovás 55'; Kotora (yellow card) 84' | Stadium: Štadión Lokomotívy v Čermeli; Attendance: 2,080; Referee: Mário Vlk; Assistant referees: Juraj Lieskovský, Mário Roszbeck; Fourth official: Radoslav Bobko |
Note: Košice won 4–1 on aggregate.
