= 2013–14 MŠK Žilina season =

MŠK Žilina
2013–14 season
- Stadium: Štadión pod Dubňom, Žilina
- Corgoň Liga: 9th Place
- Slovnaft Cup: Quarterfinals

MŠK Žilina are a Slovak football club which are based in Žilina. During the 2013/14 campaign they competed in the Slovak Super League, Slovak Cup, UEFA Europa League.

== Competitions ==
=== Slovak Super Liga ===
==== League table ====
Pos	Team	Pld	W	D	L	GF	GA	GD	Pts
7	Myjava	33	13	6	14	45	54	−9	45
8	Dukla Banská Bystrica	33	11	9	13	48	48	0	42
9	Žilina	33	11	7	15	49	50	−1	40
10	ViOn Zlaté Moravce	33	11	5	17	36	47	−11	38
11	DAC Dunajská Streda (Note: Dunajská Streda were deducted six points at the end of the season due to match-fixing.)	33	8	8	17	29	57	−28	26

Source: Niké liga (in Slovak)
Rules for classification: 1) points; 2) goal difference; 3) number of goals scored.

==== Matches ====
14 July 2013 Match 1	MFK Ružomberok	2–2	MŠK Žilina	Ružomberok
18:30	Ďubek 12'; Tawamba 90'	Summary	Pečovský 38'; Pich 49'; Piaček (yellow card) 90'	Stadium: Štadión MFK Ružomberok; Attendance: 3,027; Referee: (Slovakia) Richard Trutz

21 July 2013 Match 2	DAC Dunajská Streda	0–1	MŠK Žilina	Dunajská Streda
18:00	Sedlák (yellow card) 82'	Summary	Jelić (yellow card) 32'; Piaček 43' (yellow card) 79'; Hučko (yellow card) 86'	Stadium: DAC Stadion; Attendance: 3,899; Referee: (Slovakia) Lubomir Samotný

28 July 2013 Match 3	MŠK Žilina	3–1	FC ViOn Zlaté Moravce	Žilina
17:30	Pich 47' (pen.); Hučko 63'; Jelić 78'; Zuziak (yellow card) 90'	Summary	Bolinha (yellow card) 10'; Orávik (yellow card) 28'; Nurković (yellow card) 34'; Pavlenda (yellow card) 46'; Obročník (yellow card) 70'; Babic 84'	Stadium: Štadión pod Dubňom; Attendance: 2,129; Referee: (Slovakia) Ivan Kružliak

4 August 2013 Match 4	FK Dukla Banská Bystrica	3–3	MŠK Žilina	Banská Bystrica
19:30	Brašeň 53'; Nosko (yellow card) 57'; Považanec 70'; Slančík 78'; Chrien (yellow card) 88'	Summary	Akakpo 13'; Babatounde 40'; Jelić (yellow card) 72'; Piaček (yellow card) 76'; Mabouka 77'	Stadium: SNP Stadium; Attendance: 3,080; Referee: (Slovakia) Petar Kralovic

11 August 2013 Match 5	MŠK Žilina	4–4	FC Nitra	Žilina
17:30	Pečovský 5'; Pich 65' (pen.) 85'; Jelić 80'	Summary	Gajdoš 2'; Turčák 23'; Šimončič 28' (yellow card) 90'; Eric Barroso (yellow card) 64'; Benčík 74'; Kaspřák (yellow card) 90'	Stadium: Štadión pod Dubňom; Attendance: 1,736; Referee: (Slovakia) Boris Marhefka

17 August 2013 Match 6	Spartak Trnava	1–0	MŠK Žilina	Trnava
17:00	Janečka (yellow card) 45'; Hodek 49'; Grabež (yellow card) 66'	Summary	Jelić (yellow card) 85'; Guba (yellow card) 90'	Stadium: Štadión Antona Malatinského; Attendance: 3,055; Referee: (Slovakia) Lubomir Samotný
