= Tomáš Lešňovský =

Slovak footballer

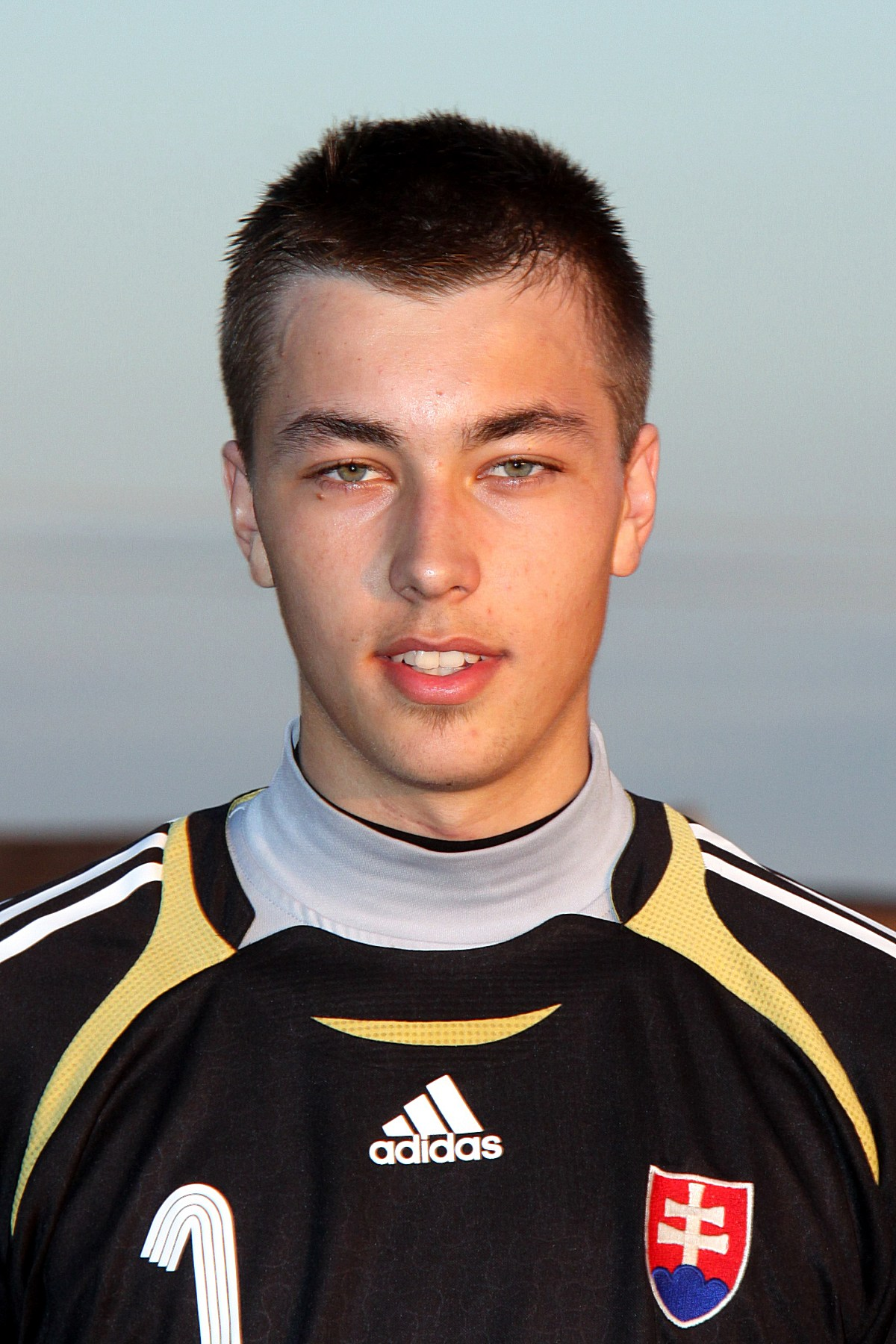

Personal information
- Date of birth: 7 October 1993 (age 33)
- Place of birth: Námestovo, Slovakia
- Height: 1.93 m (6 ft 4 in)
- Position: Goalkeeper

Team information
- Current team: Námestovo
- Number: 1

Youth career
- –2010: Námestovo
- 2010–2013: Ružomberok

Senior career*
Years	Team	Apps	(Gls)
2012–2014	Ružomberok	6	(0)
2014	1. HFK Olomouc		
2014–2015	Ružomberok	4	(0)
2015	→ Dolný Kubín (loan)	8	(0)
2016	Břeclav	9	(0)
2016	Pohronie	5	(0)
2017–	Námestovo	115	(0)

International career^{‡}
2012	Slovakia U19	1	(0)
- * Club domestic league appearances and goals as of 15:30, 10 January 2024 (UTC) ‡ National team caps and goals as of 14 December 2012

Tomáš Lešňovský (born 7 October 1993) is a Slovak football goalkeeper who currently plays for the Námestovo in 3. Liga.

== MFK Ružomberok ==
He made his debut for the Ružomberok senior side on 24 November 2012 in the Corgoň Liga match against Spartak Trnava, coming on as a '57 minute substitute for injured Lukáš Zich, in the 1-0 away win.
