= Church of the Virgin Mary (Senica) =

Roman Catholic church in Senica, Slovakia

Coordinates: 48.6795°N 17.3678°E

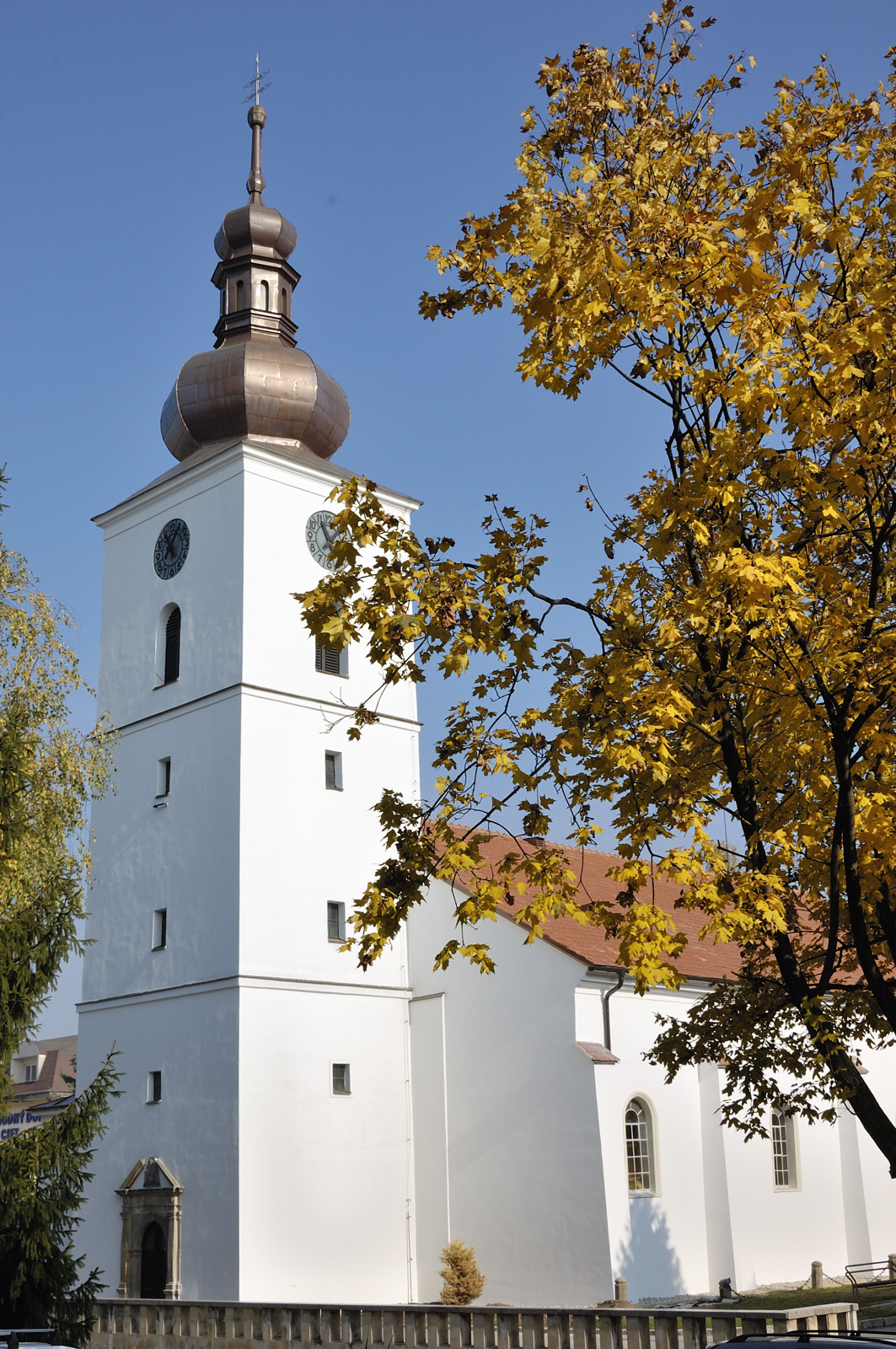
Church of the Virgin Mary

The Church of the Virgin Mary is a Roman Catholic church located in a minor square in Senica, Slovakia.

== History ==
Built in 1631, it was originally intended as a Protestant place of worship, but became Catholic in 1654. A major construction makeover occurred a year later, in 1655. The tower of the church, located on the west side, had an upper stage in late Baroque added (1754–1788). Further changes took place in 1936 and 1949, the latter being in desperate need, due to damage caused during World War II. At this time, the church was renovated with a more contemporary style.

The Church of the Virgin Mary is of a simple three-aisle design, with a plain, undecorated facade. The core of the church is enlivened by only four support pillars decorated with sloping roofs. In between are four rectangular windows with semicircular tops. The facade of the rearranged main entrance tower (not in use at this time) is horizontally decorated with cornices and smaller rectangular windows. The dome, designed in quasi-Baroque style in 1959, was part of the reconstruction of the roof made in the beginning of the 20th century. It was covered by copper shingles in 1963.

The Renaissance entry portal consists of an edicule and an upper shield in which its coat-of-arms are placed. The entry point is lined with pilasters.

== Gallery ==
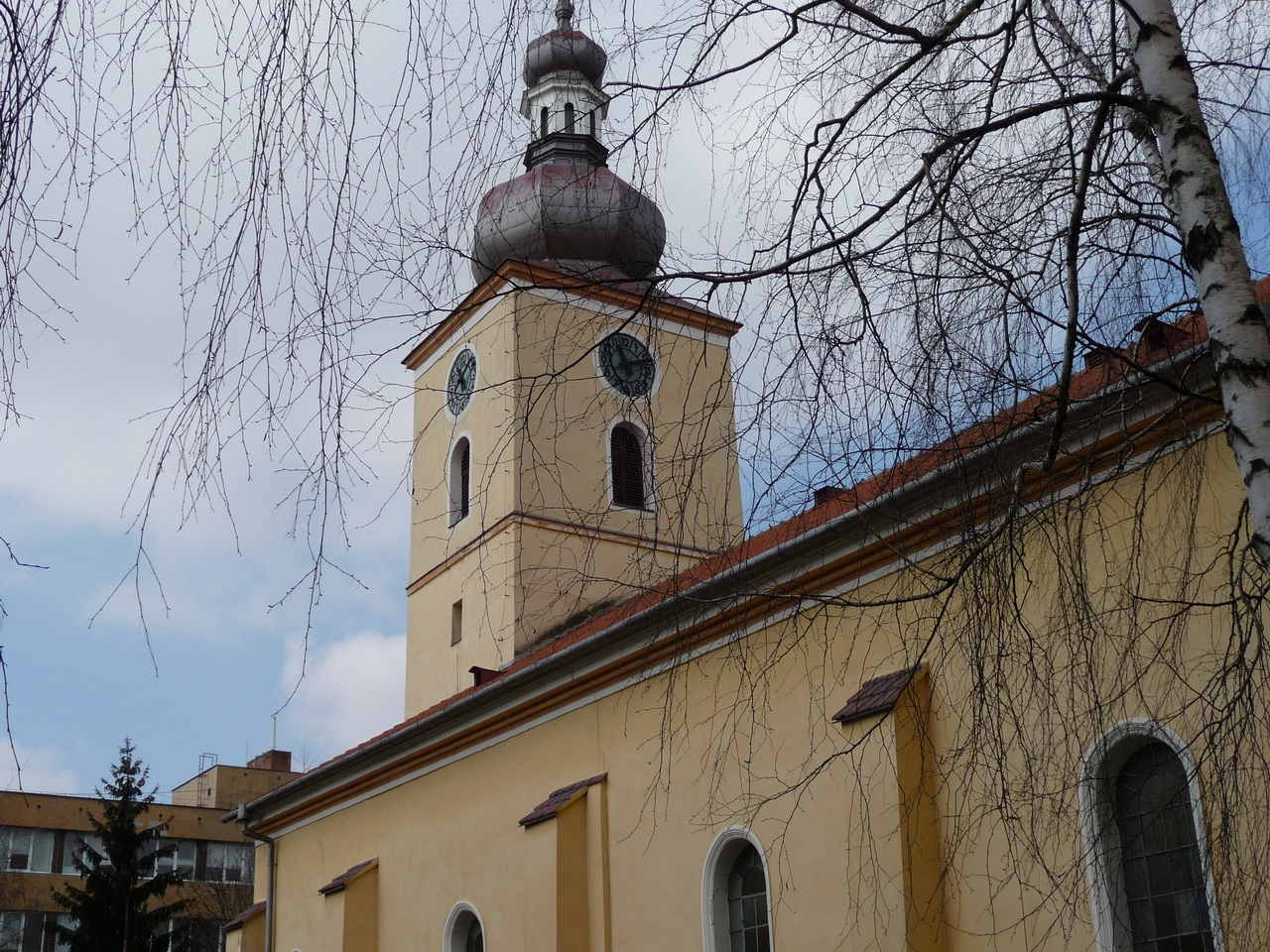
Senica, Church of the Virgin Mary

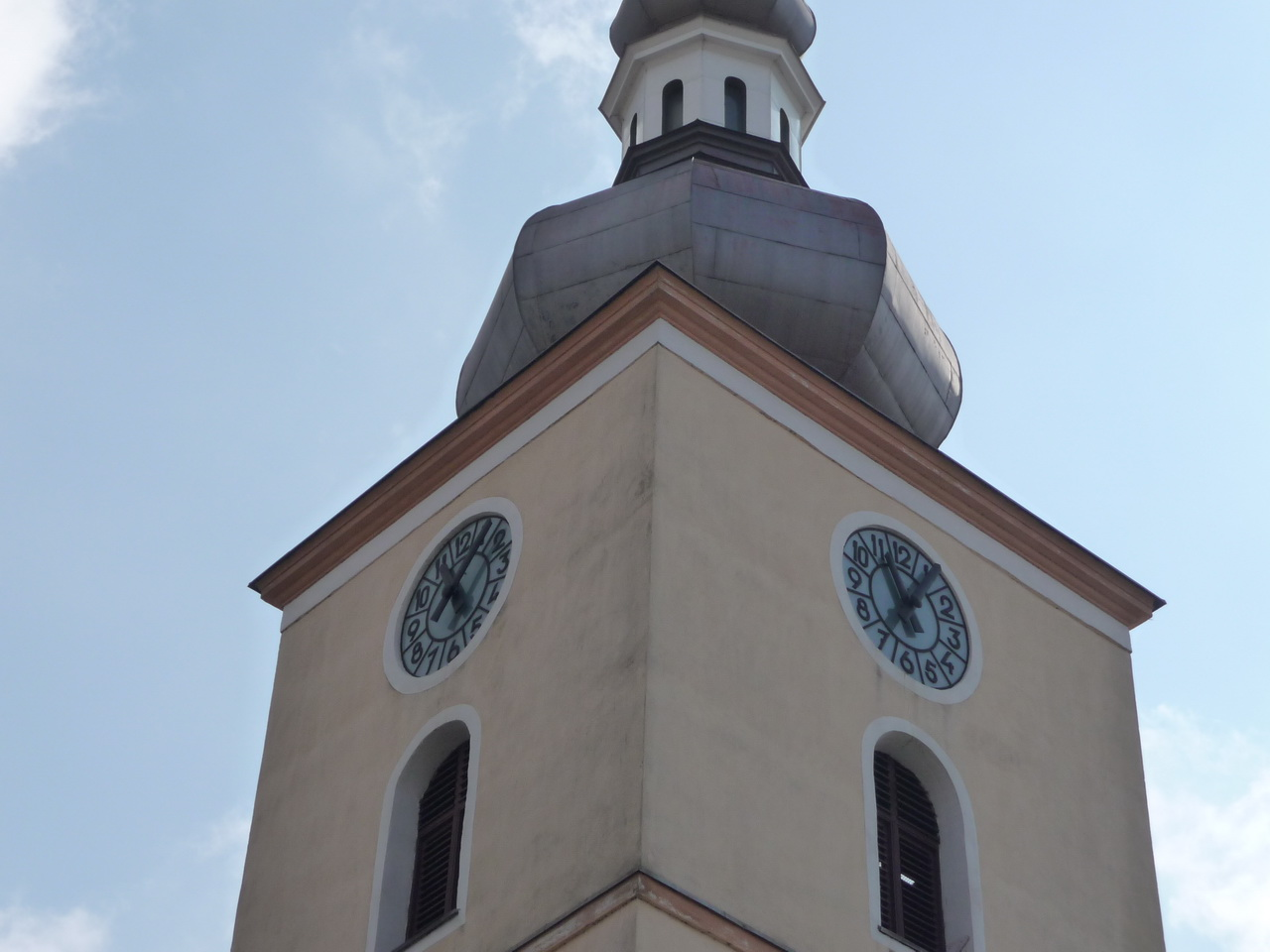
Senica, Church of the Virgin Mary tower

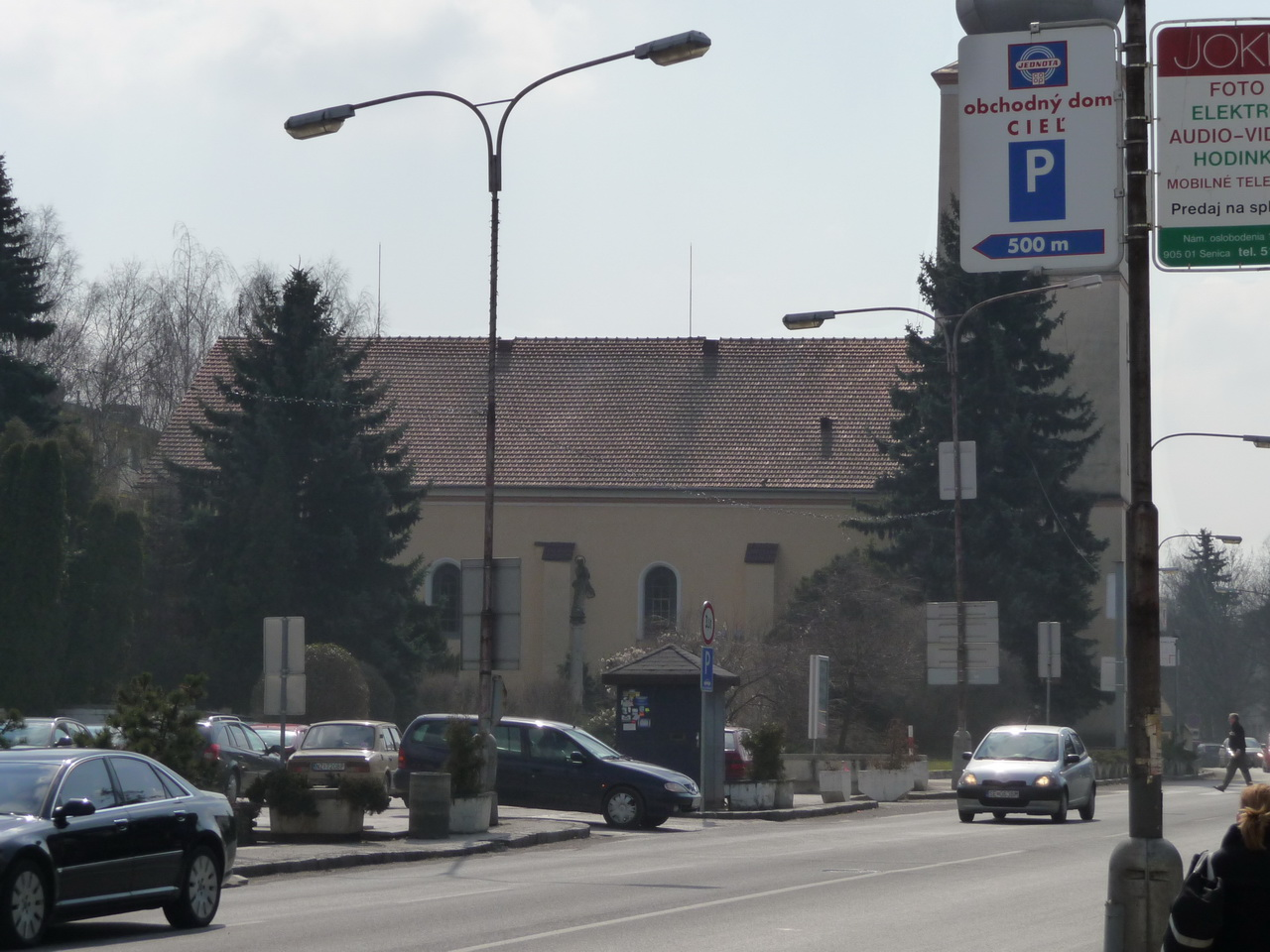
Senica, Church of the Virgin Mary, street view
