= Michal Peňaška =

Slovak footballer

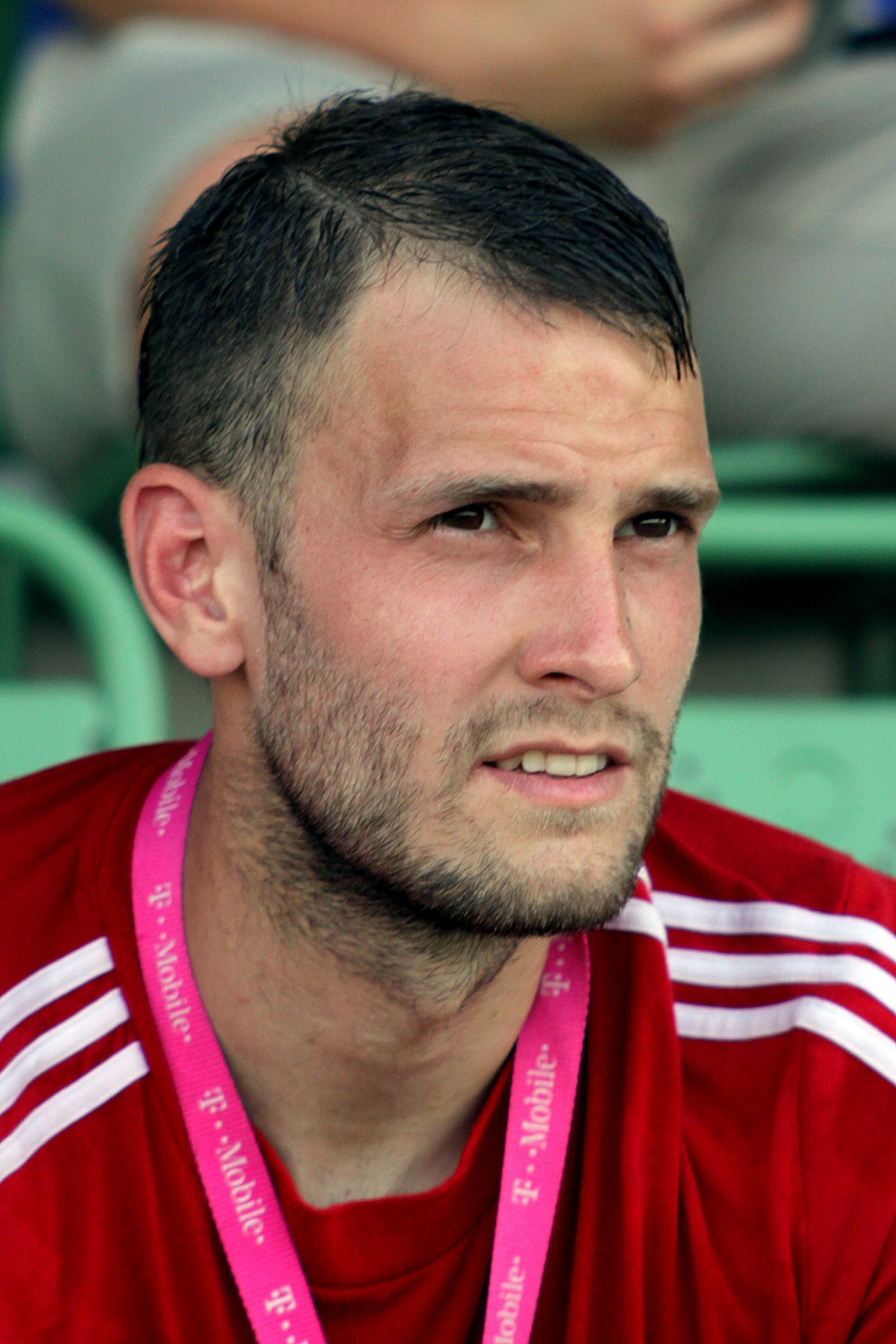

Personal information
- Full name: Michal Peňaška
- Date of birth: 30 August 1986 (age 40)
- Place of birth: Malacky, Czechoslovakia
- Position: Forward

Youth career
- ŠK Malacky
- Slovan Bratislava

Senior career*
Years	Team	Apps	(Gls)
2005–	Slovan Bratislava B		
2012	→ Senec (loan)	30	(6)
2013–2014	→ Banská Bystrica (loan)	60	(6)
2015	→ Spartak Myjava (loan)	11	(0)
- * Club domestic league appearances and goals as of 7 June 2015

Michal Peňaška (born 30 August 1986) is a professional Slovak football striker.

== Career ==
He made his debut for FK Dukla Banská Bystrica against MŠK Žilina on 2 March 2013, scoring the only goal in a 1 - 0 win at Žilina.
