= Martin Nosek =

Slovak footballer

Personal information
- Full name: Martin Nosek
- Date of birth: 26 January 1987 (age 39)
- Place of birth: Ilava, Czechoslovakia
- Height: 1.83 m (6 ft 0 in)
- Position: Defender

Team information
- Current team: FC Hradec Králové

Youth career
- 2002–2005: Dubnica

Senior career*
Years	Team	Apps	(Gls)
2007–2011	Dubnica	133	(4)
2012–2014	Ružomberok	56	(1)
2015–	Hradec Králové	4	(0)
- * Club domestic league appearances and goals as of 26 May 2013

Martin Nosek (born 26 January 1987) is a Slovak footballer who plays as a defender for FC Hradec Králové.
