= Marco De Vito =

Italian football defender

Personal information
- Date of birth: 14 January 1991 (age 35)
- Place of birth: Soverato, Italy
- Height: 1.91 m (6 ft 3 in)
- Position: Centre back

Team information
- Current team: United Riccione
- Number: 14

Youth career
- –2010: Chievo Verona

Senior career*
Years	Team	Apps	(Gls)
2010–2011	Villafranca	6	(0)
2011–2012	Marsala	12	(0)
2013	Imotski	15	(1)
2013–2015	Dukla Banská Bystrica	33	(0)
2015–2016	Folgore Caratese	32	(0)
2016–2018	Monopoli	8	(1)
2017	→ Reggina (loan)	11	(1)
2018–2019	Lucchese	25	(2)
2019–2020	Rimini	9	(0)
2020–2021	Lucchese	15	(0)
2021–2022	Flaminia	15	(0)
2022–2024	Mobilieri Ponsacco	61	(1)
2025–	United Riccione		
- * Club domestic league appearances and goals as of 8 October 2023

Marco De Vito (born 14 January 1991) is an Italian footballer who plays as a centre back for United Riccione.

== Career ==
On 17 September 2013, De Vito joined Dukla Banská Bystrica.

On 29 November 2019, he signed with Serie C club Rimini.

On 29 September 2020, he returned to Lucchese.
