= Marek Šovčík =

Slovak footballer

Personal information
- Date of birth: 8 January 1993 (age 33)
- Place of birth: Slovakia
- Height: 1.86 m (6 ft 1 in)
- Position: Forward

Team information
- Current team: FC Illmitz

Youth career
- –2009: FK Jupie Podlavice
- 2009–2012: Dukla Banská Bystrica

Senior career*
Years	Team	Apps	(Gls)
2012–2015	Banská Bystrica	70	(5)
2015–2016	Žarnovica		
2016–2017	ASV Spratzern		
2017–2018	USC Grafenwörth		
2018	ATSV St. Georgen/Steinfeld		
2019–2022	SG ASV Neudorf/Parndorf II		
2022–2024	FC Sankt Andrä		
2024–	FC Illmitz		
- * Club domestic league appearances and goals as of 17 June 2015

Marek Šovčík (born 8 January 1993) is a Slovak football forward who plays for Austrian club FC Illmitz.

== Dukla Banská Bystrica ==
He made his professional debut for Dukla Banská Bystrica against Nitra on 10 November 2012.
