= Dušan Plavšić =

Serbian footballer

Personal information
- Date of birth: 23 May 1992 (age 34)
- Place of birth: Belgrade, Serbia, FR Yugoslavia
- Height: 1.79 m (5 ft 10 in)
- Position: Defensive midfielder

Team information
- Current team: Zemun
- Number: 6

Senior career*
Years	Team	Apps	(Gls)
2011	BSK Borča	2	(0)
2011–2013	Rad	0	(0)
2011–2012	→ Palić (loan)	19	(0)
2012	→ BASK (loan)	15	(0)
2013	→ Mladenovac (loan)	14	(0)
2013	→ Dolina Padina (loan)	14	(0)
2014	Dukla Banská Bystrica	12	(0)
2014	Sloboda Užice	7	(0)
2015	Jedinstvo Užice	7	(1)
2015–2017	BSK Borča	42	(0)
2017	Kolubara	14	(0)
2017–2019	Proleter Novi Sad	58	(0)
2019–2022	Železničar Pančevo	69	(0)
2022–2024	OFK Beograd	48	(0)
2024–	Zemun	51	(0)
- * Club domestic league appearances and goals as of 14 May 2025

Dušan Plavšić (Serbian Cyrillic: Душан Плавшић; born 23 May 1992) is a Serbian footballer who plays as a midfielder for Zemun.

== Club career ==
=== BSK Borča ===
Plavšić started his career with BSK Borča in the Serbian SuperLiga. He only made two appearances during his time with the club, against Spartak Subotica on 5 March 2011 and Red Star Belgrade on 20 March 2011.

== Honours ==
Proleter Novi Sad

- Serbian First League: 2017–18
