= Saša Savić =

Serbian footballer

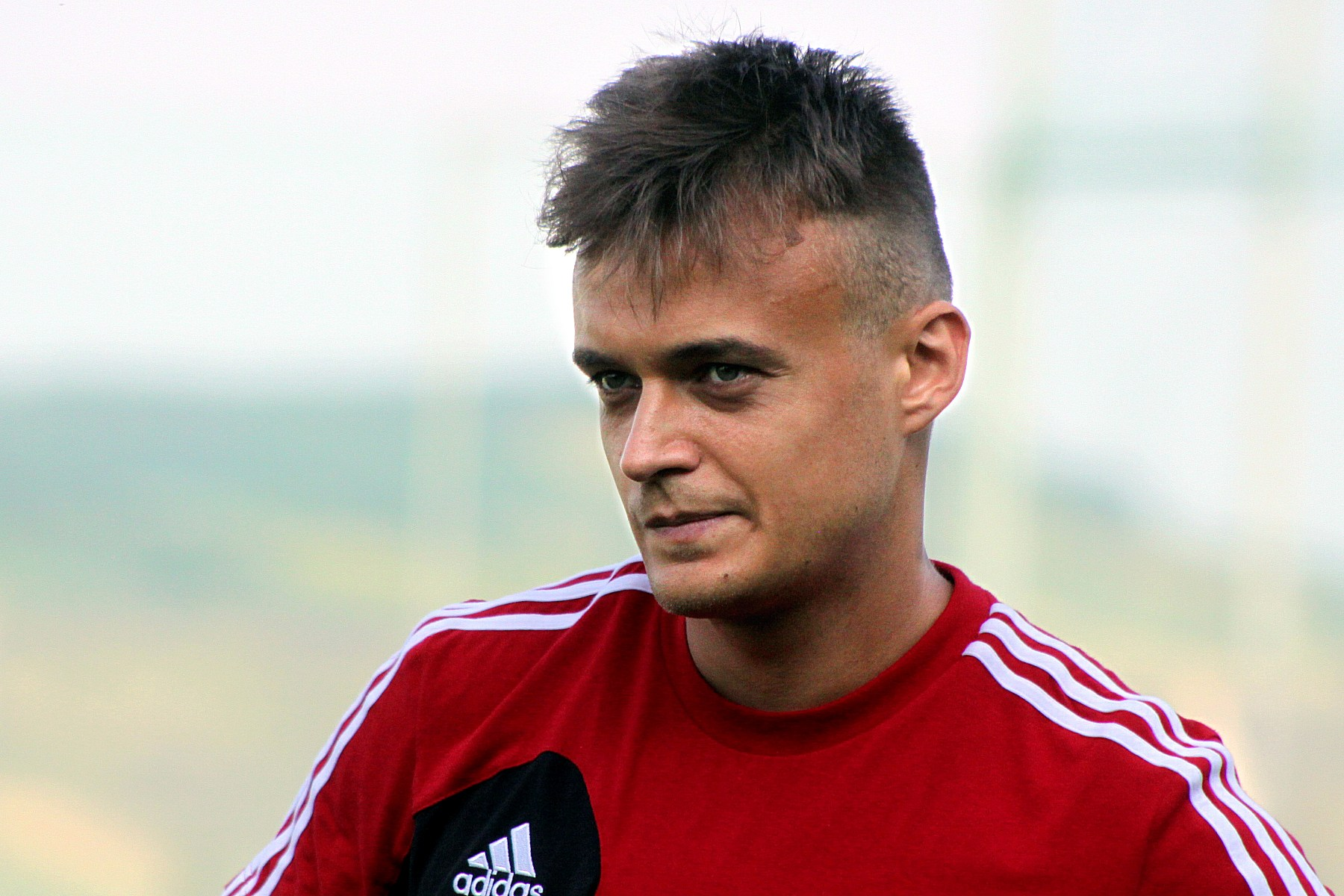

Personal information
- Full name: Saša Savić
- Date of birth: 5 February 1984 (age 42)
- Place of birth: Novi Sad, SFR Yugoslavia
- Height: 1.78 m (5 ft 10 in)
- Position: Left back

Senior career*
Years	Team	Apps	(Gls)
2002–2003	Vojvodina	0	(0)
2003–2005	Kabel	18	(0)
2005	Čukarički		
2006	Novi Sad		
2006–2008	Sloga Temerin		
2008–2009	ŽP ŠPORT Podbrezová		
2009–2020	Dukla Banská Bystrica	251	(1)
2020–2025	ŠK Sásová		
- * Club domestic league appearances and goals as of 29 July 2020

Saša Savić (Serbian Cyrillic: Саша Савић; born 5 February 1984) is a Serbian footballer. He also holds Slovak citizenship.

He previously played with Vojvodina, Kabel, Čukarički and Novi Sad in Serbia, and with ŽP Šport Podbrezová in Slovakia. A club legend of Dukla Banská Bystrica, his shirt number 34 was retired when Savić left the club in 2020.
