= Lukáš Lupták =

Slovak footballer

Personal information
- Full name: Lukáš Lupták
- Date of birth: 28 July 1990 (age 36)
- Place of birth: Ružomberok, Czechoslovakia
- Height: 1.79 m (5 ft 10 in)
- Positions: Full back; winger

Team information
- Current team: Dolný Kubín
- Number: 18

Youth career
- Ružomberok

Senior career*
Years	Team	Apps	(Gls)
2012–2016	Ružomberok	105	(6)
2016	Baník Ostrava	12	(1)
2017	Příbram	4	(0)
2017–2018	Senica	16	(0)
2018	Spartak Trnava	8	(0)
2019	Třinec	5	(0)
2019–2021	Oravské Veselé		
2020	→ FC Petržalka (loan)	1	(0)
2021–	Dolný Kubín	51+	(1)
- * Club domestic league appearances and goals as of 22 June 2024

Lukáš Lupták (born 28 July 1990) is a Slovak footballer who plays for Dolný Kubín as a full back or winger.

== Club career ==
He made his Slovak league debut for Ružomberok against Zlaté Moravce on 14 July 2012.

In July 2018, he was signed by Spartak Trnava.
