= Dominik Rodinger =

Czech footballer (born 1986)

Personal information
- Date of birth: 7 August 1986 (age 40)
- Place of birth: Prague, Czechoslovakia
- Height: 1.87 m (6 ft 2 in)
- Position: Goalkeeper

Youth career
- 1993–1997: FSC Libuš
- 1997–2004: Bohemians Prag

Senior career*
| Years | Team | Apps | (Gls) |
| 2004 | Bohemians Prague | 1 | (0) |
| 2005 | Teplice | 0 | (0) |
| 2005–2006 | Xaverov Horní Počernice | 0 | (0) |
| 2006–2007 | Zemplín Michalovce | 22 | (0) |
| 2008–2010 | Slovan Bratislava | 17 | (0) |
| 2010 | → Bohemians Prague (loan) | 2 | (0) |
| 2011–2012 | Badajoz | 1 | (0) |
| 2013 | FSC Libuš | | |
| 2013 | Dukla Banská Bystrica | 8 | (0) |
| 2014 | Zápy | | |

International career
- Czech Republic U21
- * Club domestic league appearances and goals

Dominik Rodinger (born 7 August 1986) is a Czech former professional footballer who played as a goalkeeper. He played in the Czech First League for FK Bohemians Praha. He also competed in the Corgoň liga for Slovan Bratislava and Dukla Banská Bystrica.
