= Pavel Kováč =

Slovak footballer

Personal information
- Full name: Pavel Kováč
- Date of birth: 12 August 1974 (age 52)
- Place of birth: Partizánske, Czechoslovakia
- Height: 1.90 m (6 ft 3 in)
- Position: Goalkeeper

Senior career*
Years	Team	Apps	(Gls)
1998–1999	Tempo Partizánske	9	(0)
1999–2003	ZŤS Dubnica	71	(0)
2003–2005	Slovácko	7	(0)
2005–2008	Apollon Kalamarias	81	(0)
2008–2010	Olympiacos	4	(0)
2010	DAC Dunajská Streda	10	(0)
2011–2013	Dubnica	15	(0)
2011	→ Dunajská Streda (loan)	18	(0)
2012–2013	→ Slovan Bratislava (loan)	11	(0)
2014	Ružomberok	8	(0)
2014–2018	ViOn Zlaté Moravce	106	(0)
- * Club domestic league appearances and goals as of 17 April 2019

Pavel Kováč (born 12 August 1974) is a Slovak former goalkeeper who last played for Slovak club FC ViOn Zlaté Moravce. He is 2.02 m tall and weighs 96 kg. His international debut came in the second half of the Slovakia vs. Hungary match on 6 February 2008.

Kováč previously played for FC Slovácko in the Gambrinus liga, Apollon Kalamarias in the Super League Greece and DAC Dunajská Streda.
