= Peter Maslo =

Slovak footballer

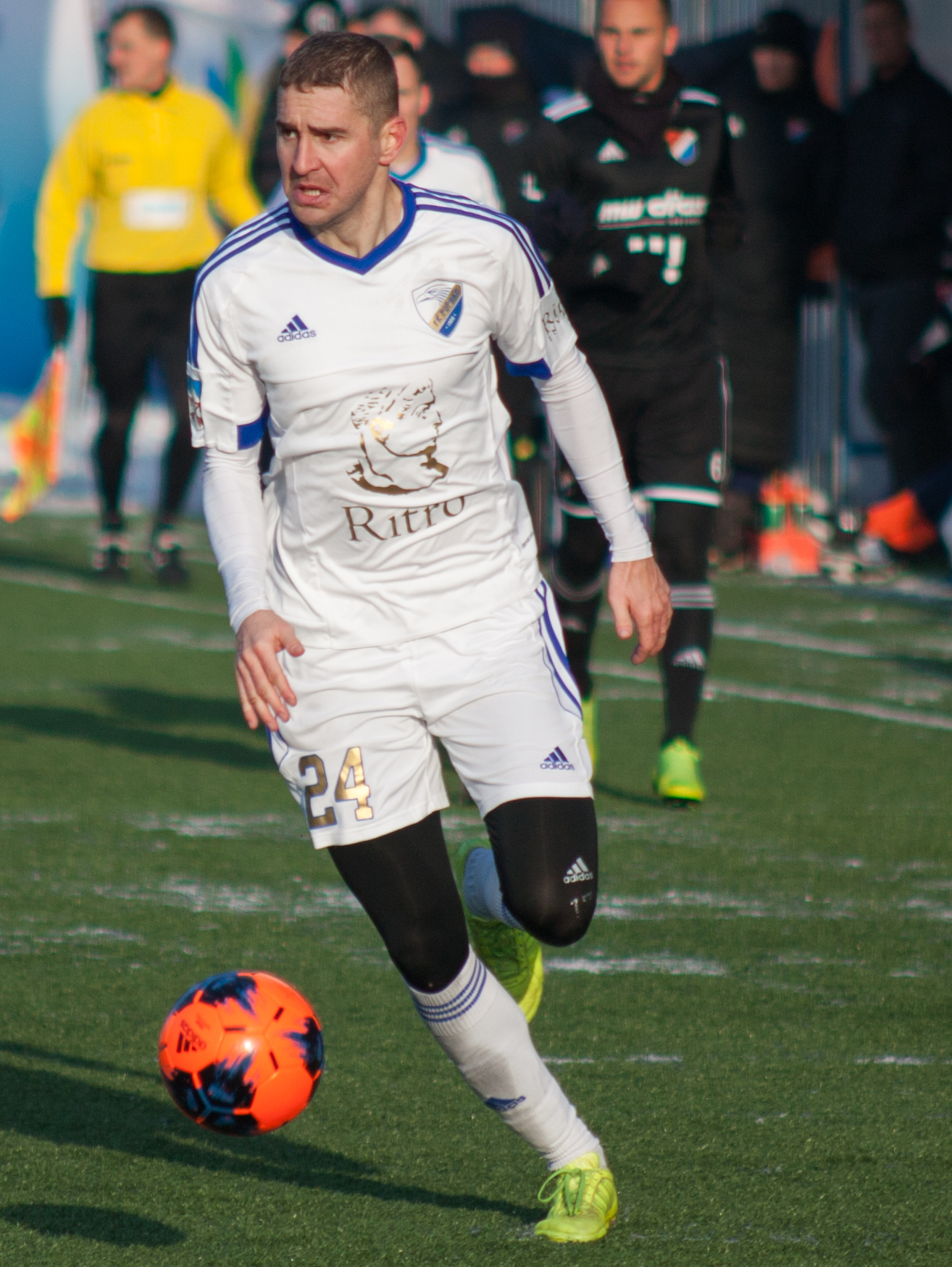
- Peter Maslo with FK Poprad

Personal information
- Full name: Peter Maslo
- Date of birth: 2 February 1987 (age 39)
- Place of birth: Trstená, Czechoslovakia
- Height: 1.82 m (6 ft 0 in)
- Position: Right-back

Team information
- Current team: OŠK Bešeňová

Youth career
- 1996–2002: Tvrdošín
- 2002–2004: Dlhá nad Oravou
- 2004: Ružomberok

Senior career*
Years	Team	Apps	(Gls)
2004–2014	Ružomberok	188	(4)
2014–2015	Termalica Bruk-Bet	12	(0)
2015–2018	Ružomberok	83	(3)
2018–2020	Poprad	30	(1)
2020–2023	ŠK Tvrdošin		
2023–	OŠK Bešeňová		

International career
2007–2008	Slovakia U21	7	(1)
- * Club domestic league appearances and goals as of 2 February 2024

Peter Maslo (born 2 February 1987) is a Slovak professional footballer who plays as a right-back for OŠK Bešeňová.
