= Mário Almaský =

Slovak footballer

Personal information
- Full name: Mário Almaský
- Date of birth: 25 June 1991 (age 35)
- Place of birth: Czechoslovakia
- Height: 1.72 m (5 ft 8 in)
- Position: Midfielder

Team information
- Current team: OŠK Bešeňová

Youth career
- Ružomberok

Senior career*
Years	Team	Apps	(Gls)
2012–2018	Ružomberok	84	(8)
2015–2016	→ ŽP Šport Podbrezová (loan)	8	(1)
2018–2019	Fluminense Šamorín	19	(2)
2019–2020	Ružomberok	2	(0)
2019–2020	→ Ružomberok II (loan)	16	(2)
2020–	OŠK Bešeňová		
- * Club domestic league appearances and goals as of 13 August 2020

Mário Almaský (born 25 June 1991) is a Slovak football midfielder who plays for OŠK Bešeňová.

== MFK Ružomberok ==
Mário made his official debut for Ružomberok on 16 May 2012, playing the last 14 minutes in a 0–3 away lost against Spartak Trnava, replacing Juraj Vavrík.
