= Jakub Brašeň =

Slovak footballer

Personal information
- Full name: Jakub Brašeň
- Date of birth: 2 May 1989 (age 37)
- Place of birth: Banská Bystrica, Czechoslovakia
- Height: 1.72 m (5 ft 8 in)
- Position: Winger

Team information
- Current team: TJD Príbelce

Youth career
- Dukla Banská Bystrica

Senior career*
| Years | Team | Apps | (Gls) |
| 2008–2013 | Dukla Banská Bystrica | 122 | (9) |
| 2014–2017 | DAC Dunajská Streda | 92 | (6) |
| 2017–2018 | Mezőkövesd | 3 | (0) |
| 2018 | Senica | 10 | (0) |
| 2018–2020 | ViOn Zlaté Moravce | 55 | (2) |
| 2020– | TJD Príbelce | | |
- * Club domestic league appearances and goals

Jakub Brašeň (born 2 May 1989) is a Slovak footballer who played as a midfielder for the Fortuna liga club ViOn Zlaté Moravce. Brašeň retired from professional football in July 2020.

== Club statistics ==
| Club | Season | League | | Cup | | Europe | | Total | |
| Club | Season | Apps | Goals | Apps | Goals | Apps | Goals | Apps | Goals |
|---|---|---|---|---|---|---|---|---|---|
Banská Bystrica
| Banská Bystrica | 2008–09 | 15 | 3 | 0 | 0 | – | – | 15 | 3 |
| Banská Bystrica | 2009–10 | 11 | 0 | 3 | 0 | – | – | 14 | 0 |
| Banská Bystrica | 2010–11 | 30 | 3 | 0 | 0 | 2 | 0 | 32 | 3 |
| Banská Bystrica | 2011–12 | 21 | 0 | 2 | 0 | – | – | 23 | 0 |
| Banská Bystrica | 2012–13 | 27 | 1 | 3 | 1 | – | – | 30 | 2 |
| Banská Bystrica | 2013–14 | 18 | 2 | 0 | 0 | – | – | 18 | 2 |
| Banská Bystrica | Total | 122 | 9 | 8 | 1 | 2 | 0 | 132 | 10 |
Dunajská Streda
| Dunajská Streda | 2013–14 | 14 | 1 | 0 | 0 | – | – | 14 | 1 |
| Dunajská Streda | 2014–15 | 32 | 2 | 6 | 1 | – | – | 38 | 3 |
| Dunajská Streda | 2015–16 | 26 | 2 | 3 | 1 | – | – | 29 | 3 |
| Dunajská Streda | 2016–17 | 20 | 1 | 3 | 0 | – | – | 23 | 1 |
| Dunajská Streda | Total | 92 | 6 | 12 | 2 | 0 | 0 | 104 | 8 |
Mezőkövesd
| Mezőkövesd | 2017–18 | 3 | 0 | 2 | 0 | – | – | 5 | 0 |
| Mezőkövesd | Total | 3 | 0 | 0 | 2 | 0 | 0 | 5 | 0 |
| Career Total | | 217 | 15 | 22 | 3 | 2 | 0 | 241 | 18 |

Updated to games played as of 9 December 2017.
