= Goran Adamović =

Serbian footballer

Personal information
- Full name: Goran Adamović
- Date of birth: 24 April 1987 (age 39)
- Place of birth: Valjevo, SFR Yugoslavia
- Height: 1.90 m (6 ft 3 in)
- Position: Centre-back

Team information
- Current team: Mqabba (Manager)

Youth career
- 2002–2003: Red Star Belgrade
- 2003–2004: Partizan

Senior career*
Years	Team	Apps	(Gls)
2004–2006	BSK Borča	36	(1)
2006–2008	Red Star Belgrade	1	(0)
2007	→ Zemun (loan)	12	(0)
2008	Novi Sad	12	(1)
2009–2011	Budućnost Podgorica	44	(0)
2012–2013	Spartak Subotica	22	(0)
2013–2014	Ružomberok	21	(0)
2015	Mladost Podgorica	10	(0)
2015–2017	Mqabba	51	(4)
2017–2020	Sliema Wanderers		
2020–2021	Gudja United	10	(0)

International career
2005	Serbia and Montenegro U19	3	(0)

Managerial career
- 2021–: Mqabba
- * Club domestic league appearances and goals

Goran Adamović (Serbian Cyrillic: Горан Адамовић; born 24 April 1987) is a retired Serbian footballer and current manager of Maltese club Mqabba.

== Playing career ==
=== Club ===
Born in Valjevo, SR Serbia, spent his youth career in Red Star Belgrade and FK Partizan. He made his senior debut in 2004 for FK BSK Borča in the Serbian League Belgrade. He joined Red Star on 16 January 2006. The following year, he won the league as well as the Serbian Cup. During the second half of the 2006–07 season, however, he was loaned to FK Zemun.

In summer 2008, he left Red Star and joined FK Novi Sad in the Serbian First League. In January 2009, he moved to Montenegrin club FK Budućnost Podgorica. With Budućnost, he was twice runner-up for the Montenegrin First League title as well as a finalist for the 2009–10 Montenegrin Cup. In summer 2012, he returned to Serbia and joined FK Spartak Subotica.

After spells at Mqabba and Sliema, he moved to fellow Maltese team Gudja United in June 2020.

=== International ===
In 2005, he was part of the Serbia and Montenegro U19 team.

== Managerial career ==
On 8 May 2021, Adamović was appointed manager of his former club - Maltese second tier-side Mqabba - after retiring as a player, signing a deal until the end of the 2021-22 season. In May 2022, he signed an extension for another season.
