= Matej Podstavek =

Slovak footballer

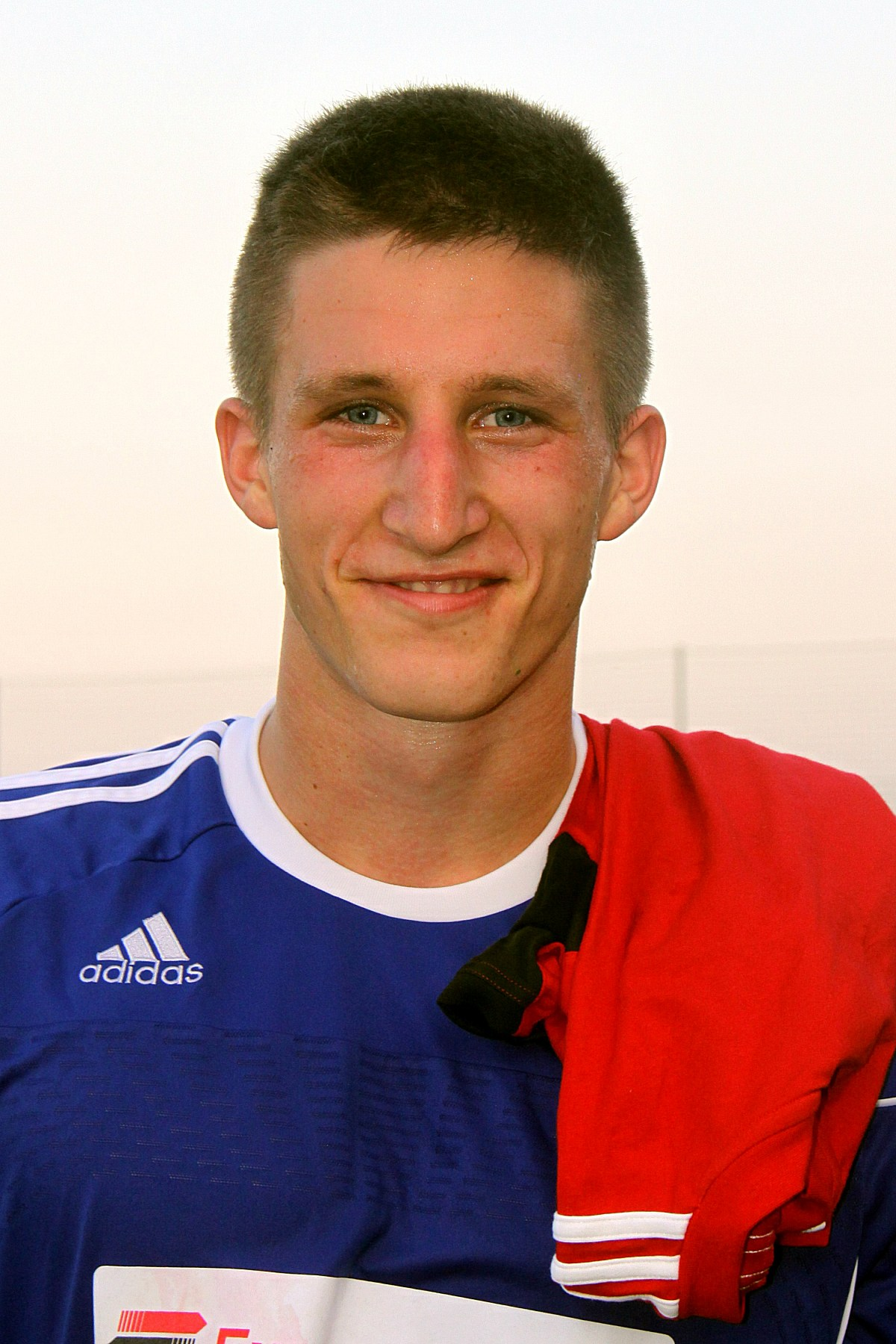
- Podstavek with Dukla Banská Bystrica in 2013

Personal information
- Full name: Matej Podstavek
- Date of birth: 21 February 1991 (age 35)
- Place of birth: Brezno, Czechoslovakia
- Height: 1.95 m (6 ft 5 in)
- Position: Centre-back

Team information
- Current team: Lokomotíva Košice

Youth career
- 1997–2008: ŠK Partizán Čierny Balog
- 2008–2011: Dukla Banská Bystrica

Senior career*
Years	Team	Apps	(Gls)
2010–2011	→ CSM Tisovec (loan)		
2011	ŠK Partizán Čierny Balog		
2011–2012	→ Kremnička (loan)		
2012–2014	Dukla Banská Bystrica	27	(1)
2014–2015	Dynamo České Budějovice	13	(0)
2015–2016	Fredericia	41	(2)
2017	Al Ansar	10	(1)
2017–2018	Thisted	24	(0)
2018	Police Tero	0	(0)
2018–2019	Železiarne Podbrezová	9	(0)
2020–	Lokomotíva Košice		
- * Club domestic league appearances and goals as of 21 June 2019

Matej Podstavek (born 21 February 1991) is a Slovak footballer who plays as a centre-back for Slovak club FC Lokomotíva Košice.

== Club career ==
He made his debut for Dukla Banská Bystrica against Žlina (2–2) on 16 September 2012. Podstavek expanded his career internationally, moving to the Czech Republic to play for SK Dynamo České Budějovice in 2014. Later, he competed in the Lebanese Premier League, joining Al-Ansar FC for the 2017-2018 season and later playing for Shabab Al-Sahel.
