= Branislav Ľupták =

Slovak footballer

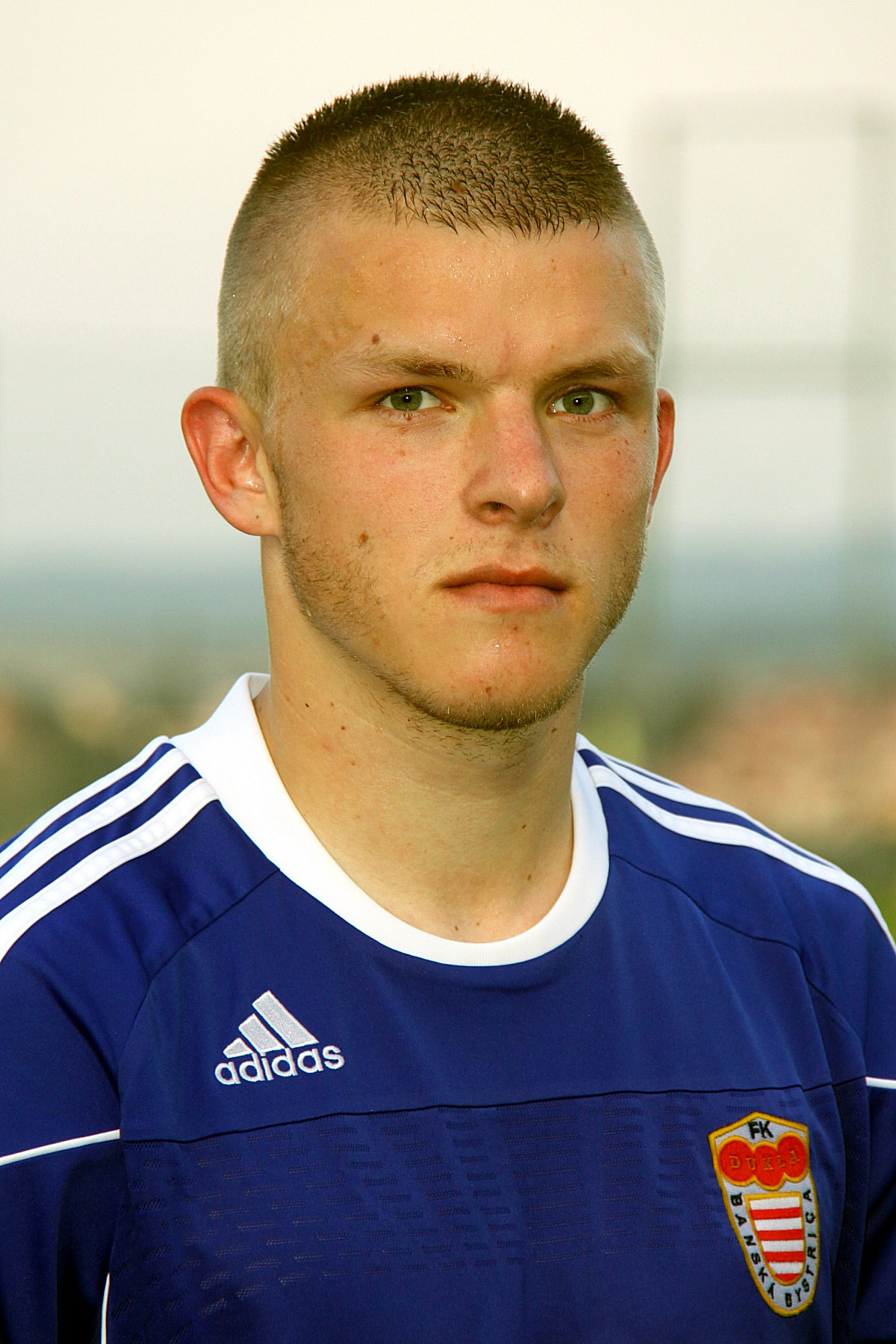
- Ľupták with Dukla Banská Bystrica in 2013

Personal information
- Full name: Branislav Ľupták
- Date of birth: 5 June 1991 (age 35)
- Place of birth: Krupina, Czechoslovakia
- Height: 1.79 m (5 ft 10 in)
- Position: Midfielder

Team information
- Current team: MFK Dukla Banská Bystrica
- Number: 10

Youth career
- 2001–2011: Dukla Banská Bystrica

Senior career*
Years	Team	Apps	(Gls)
2011–2014	Dukla Banská Bystrica	80	(4)
2015–2017	DAC Dunajská Streda	70	(4)
2018–2019	Ružomberok	11	(0)
2018–2019	→ ViOn Zlaté Moravce (loan)	22	(1)
2019–2020	Gloria Buzău	17	(0)
2020–2021	TJ Tatran VLM Pliešovce		
2021–2026	Dukla Banská Bystrica	121	(1)

International career
2012	Slovakia U21	2	(0)
- * Club domestic league appearances and goals as of 25 May 2026

Branislav Ľupták (born 5 June 1991) is a Slovak professional footballer who currently plays for MFK Dukla Banská Bystrica, competing in the Niké liga.

== Club career ==
Ľupták made his debut for Dukla Banská Bystrica against Nitra on 16 July 2011.

In 2015, Ľupták played for FC DAC 1904 Dunajská Streda.

On 3 July 2019 Ľupták signed a contract with Romanian Liga II side Gloria Buzău. He left the club after a single season.

In 2021, it was announced that Ľupták would be returning to FK Dukla Banská Bystrica in the Slovak First Football League.
