= Senica =

Town in Slovakia

- Municipality
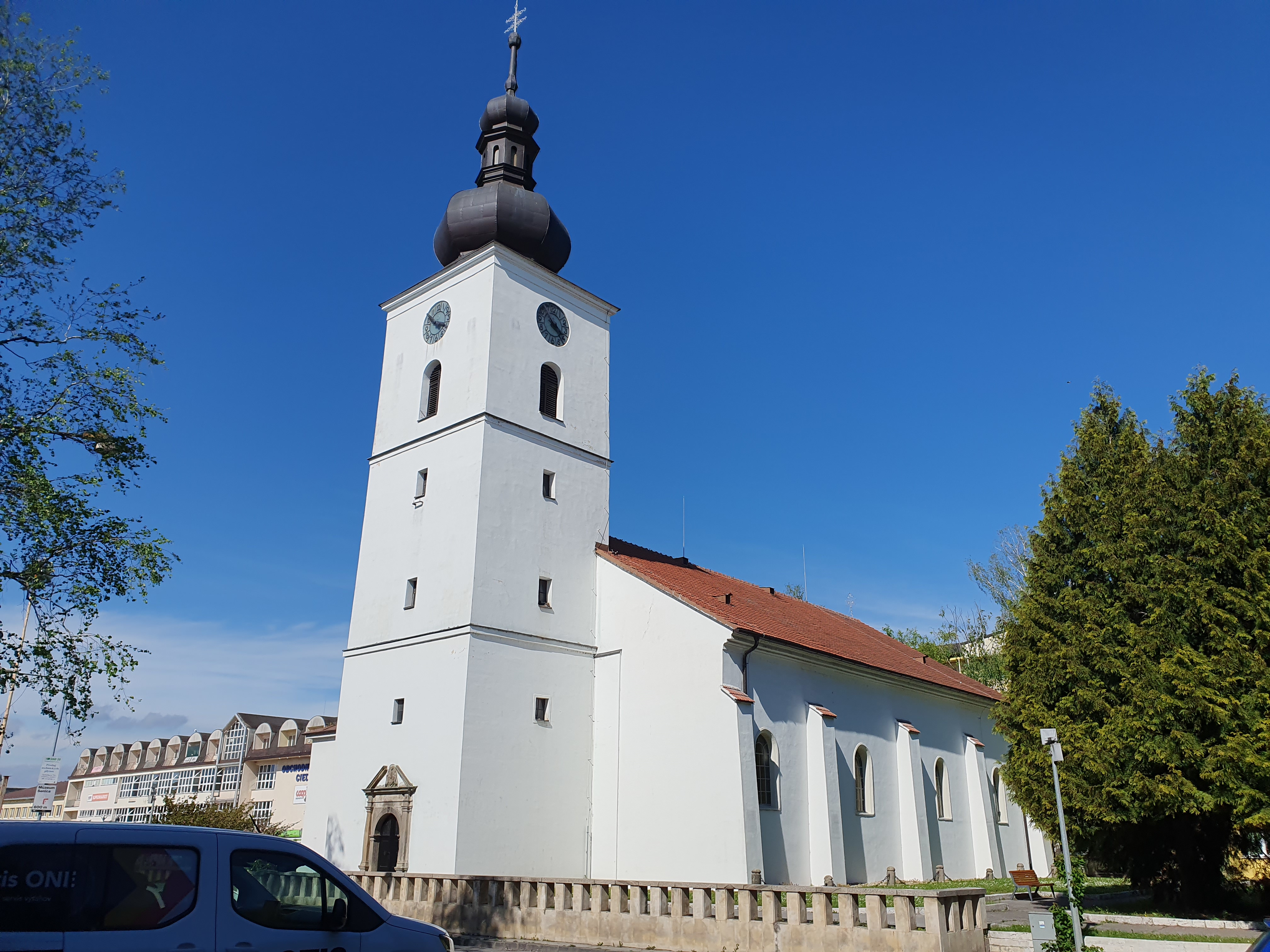

- Flag Coat of arms

- Location of Senica in the Trnava Region Location of Senica in Slovakia
- Coordinates: 48.68°N 17.37°E
- Country: Slovakia
- Region: Trnava Region
- District: Senica District
- First mentioned: 1217

Government
  - Mayor: Martin Džačovský

Area
  - Total: 50.33 km^{2} (19.43 sq mi)
- Elevation: 206 m (676 ft)

Population (2025)
  - Total: 18,970
- Time zone: UTC+1 (CET)
  - Summer (DST): UTC+2 (CEST)
- Postal code: 905 01
- Area code: +421 34
- Vehicle registration plate (until 2022): SE
- Website: senica.sk

Senica (Slovak pronunciation: [ˈseɲitsa]; German: Senitz; Hungarian: Szenice, Szénásfalu) is a town in Trnava Region, western Slovakia. It is located in the north-eastern part of the Záhorie lowland, close to the Little Carpathians.

== Geography ==
The municipality lies at an altitude of 206 metres (676 ft) and covers an area of 50.33 km^{2} (19.43 sq mi) (2025).

== Etymology ==
The name is derived from the word seno 'hay' with the suffix -ica used to form a place name.

== History ==
Senica's history is closely related to Branč Castle, built in 1251–1261. It was first mentioned in 1256 and received its city privileges in 1396, confirmed in 1463 and 1492. The city was affected by Turkish wars, anti-Habsburg uprisings, and the Reformation and counter-reformations in the 17th century. In 1746, it became the seat of a district within Nyitra County.

== Population ==
Historical population
| Year | Pop. | ±% |
|---|---|---|
| 1970 | 11,383 | — |
| 1980 | 15,515 | +36.3% |
| 1991 | 20,085 | +29.5% |
| 2001 | 21,253 | +5.8% |
| 2011 | 20,255 | −4.7% |
| 2021 | 19,875 | −1.9% |
Source: Censuses

Population statistic (10 years)
| Year | 1995 | 2005 | 2015 | 2025 |
|---|---|---|---|---|
| Count | 21,157 | 20,860 | 20,380 | 18,970 |
| Difference | | −1.40% | −2.30% | −6.91% |

Population statistic
| Year | 2024 | 2025 |
|---|---|---|
| Count | 19,137 | 18,970 |
| Difference | | −0.87% |

It has a population of 18,970 people (31 December 2025).

=== Ethnicity ===
Census 2021 (1+ %)
| Ethnicity | Number | Fraction |
|---|---|---|
| Slovak | 18,652 | 93.84% |
| Not found out | 981 | 4.93% |
| Czech | 314 | 1.57% |
| Total | 19,875 | |

In year 2021 was 19,875 people by ethnicity 18,652 as Slovak, 981 as Not found out, 314 as Czech, 71 as Other, 66 as Romani, 38 as Hungarian, 25 as Rusyn, 23 as Ukrainian, 21 as Romanian, 19 as Russian, 15 as Polish, 14 as Vietnamese, 12 as German, 9 as Moravian, 8 as Italian, 8 as Austrian, 7 as Albanian, 4 as Serbian, 4 as French, 4 as Croatian, 4 as English, 3 as Jewish, 3 as Greek, 2 as Chinese, 2 as Irish, 2 as Silesian and 2 as Bulgarian.

Note on population: The difference values of population numbers in the table "Population statistic" and in the sections "Ethnicity" & "Religion" is caused by the use of various statistical methods.

=== Religion ===
Census 2021 (1+ %)
| Religion | Number | Fraction |
|---|---|---|
| None | 8419 | 42.36% |
| Roman Catholic Church | 7276 | 36.61% |
| Evangelical Church | 2488 | 12.52% |
| Not found out | 1193 | 6% |
| Total | 19,875 | |

In year 2021 was 19,875 people by religion 8419 from None, 7276 from Roman Catholic Church, 2488 from Evangelical Church, 1193 from Not found out, 104 from Greek Catholic Church, 72 from Ad hoc movements, 63 from Jehovah's Witnesses, 44 from Other, 36 from Apostolic Church, 31 from Eastern Orthodox Church, 28 from Christian Congregations in Slovakia, 25 from Buddhism, 15 from Paganism and natural spirituality, 13 from Islam, 12 from Other and not ascertained christian church, 12 from United Methodist Church, 11 from Calvinist Church, 8 from Seventh-day Adventist Church, 7 from Old Catholic Church, 6 from Jewish community, 4 from Czechoslovak Hussite Church, 2 from Hinduism, 2 from Church of the Brethren, 2 from Church of Jesus Christ of Latter-day Saints, 1 from New Apostolic Church and 1 from Baptists Church.

== Industry ==
A significant silk-producing company is based in Senica. The company was established in 1954 under the name "Slovenský hodváb". In 2005 the production of viscose rayon was halted. After the merger of Slovenský hodváb and Kord into the new company Slovkor, it continued only with the production of Synthetic fiber for technical purposes. In February 2014, the factory chimney, which dominated the city for more than half a century and was visible from a long distance, was demolished.

OMS lighting, one of the biggest luminaire companies in Eastern and Central Europe, is also based in Senica. With around 1000 employees and exporting 98% of its production to more than 100 countries, the company is a referent in the economy of Senica.

== Sport ==
Senica is one of the locations where Slovak Bandy Association has organised rink bandy sessions. The club is called Športový klub Rytieri Bandy Senica and was founded in 2018.

== Twin towns – sister cities ==
Senica is twinned with:

- Bač, Serbia (2004)
- Herzogenbuchsee, Switzerland (2004)
- Pułtusk, Poland (2002)
- Trutnov, Czech Republic (1998)
- Velké Pavlovice, Czech Republic (2002)
- Santa Tecla, El Salvador (2012)

== See also ==
- Banská Štiavnica, Slovakia (German: Schemnitz)
- Church of the Virgin Mary (Senica)
- List of municipalities and towns in Slovakia
