= Jakub Považanec =

Slovak footballer

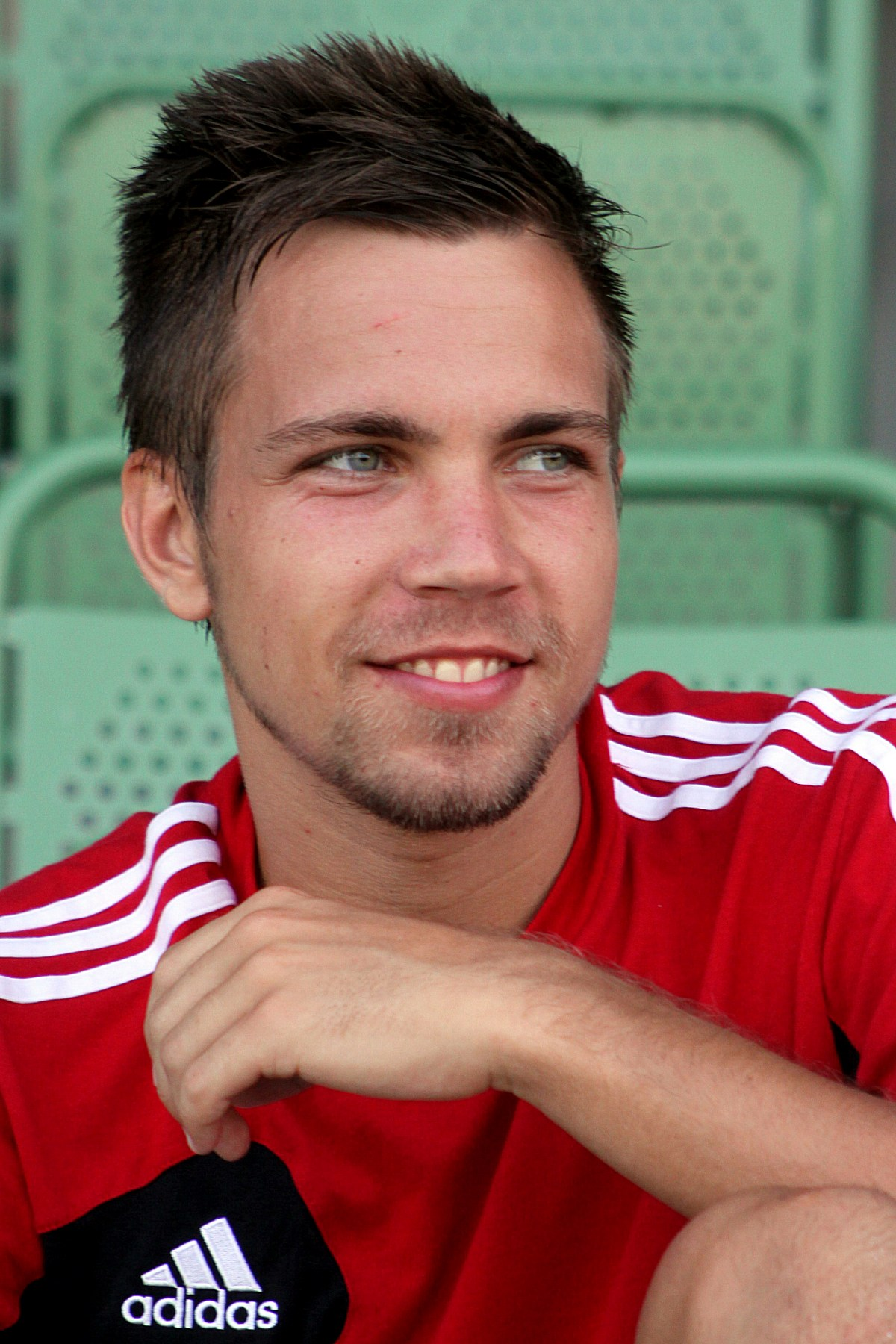

Personal information
- Full name: Jakub Považanec
- Date of birth: 31 January 1991 (age 35)
- Place of birth: Banská Bystrica, Czechoslovakia
- Height: 1.81 m (5 ft 11 in)
- Position: Midfielder

Team information
- Current team: Dukla Banská Bystrica
- Number: 7

Youth career
- Dukla Banská Bystrica

Senior career*
Years	Team	Apps	(Gls)
2009–2014	Dukla Banská Bystrica	110	(8)
2014–2017	Dukla Prague	72	(5)
2017–2023	Jablonec	200	(14)
2023–	Dukla Banská Bystrica	72	(4)

International career^{‡}
2009–2010	Slovakia U19	10	(1)
2011–2012	Slovakia U21	7	(1)
2016–	Slovakia	0	(0)
- * Club domestic league appearances and goals as of 21 September 2026 ‡ National team caps and goals as of 9 December 2012

Jakub Považanec (born 31 January 1991) is a Slovak footballer who plays as a midfielder for Dukla Banská Bystrica.

== Club career ==
Považanec joined Dukla Prague in 2014, signing a three-year contract with the club. He joined Jablonec in January 2017, signing a three-year contract. In September 2023, Považanec returned to Dukla Banská Bystrica.

== International career ==
Považanec was first called up to the senior Slovakia squad for a 2018 FIFA World Cup qualifier against England in September 2016.

His second opportunity to mark a debut in the national team was when coach Ján Kozák called him up for two friendly fixtures held in Abu Dhabi, UAE, in January 2017, against Uganda (1–3 loss) and Sweden. However Dukla Prague refused to free him and his teammate Lukáš Štetina for the fixtures. He was subsequently replaced in the squad by Miroslav Káčer from Žilina.
