= Lukáš Zich =

Czech footballer

Personal information
- Full name: Lukáš Zich
- Date of birth: 10 January 1985 (age 41)
- Place of birth: Prague, Czechoslovakia
- Height: 1.93 m (6 ft 4 in)
- Position: Goalkeeper

Youth career
- 1991–1995: SK Zbraslav
- 1995–1997: Bohemians 1905
- 1997–2004: Sparta Prague

Senior career*
Years	Team	Apps	(Gls)
2004–2011	Sparta Prague	0	(0)
2007	→ Zenit Čáslav (loan)		
2008	→ Bohemians 1905 (loan)	5	(0)
2008–2009	→ Jablonec (loan)	11	(0)
2009–2010	→ Slovan Liberec (loan)	4	(0)
2011	→ Hradec Králové (loan)	3	(0)
2012–2013	Ružomberok	36	(0)
2013–2014	Viktoria Žižkov		
2015–2016	FK Sparta Kutná Hora		
- * Club domestic league appearances and goals as of 26 May 2013

Lukáš Zich (born 10 January 1985) is a Czech football goalkeeper. He previously notably played for Sparta Prague or Ružomberok.

== Career ==
Zich spent the first half of the 2007–08 season on loan in the Czech 2. Liga with Čáslav. After moving on loan to Bohemians 1905 in the winter break, he made his Czech First League debut in March 2008 against Jablonec, coming on as a substitute after the dismissal of starting goalkeeper Radek Sňozík.

In the 2008–09 season, Zich played in the Czech First League for Jablonec. He made his league debut for the club in a 1–1 home draw with Kladno. He made a single appearance in the first part of the season but was promoted to first-choice goalkeeper after the winter break following goalkeeper Michal Špit sustaining a broken finger in March 2009.

In the 2009–10 season, Zich played four times for Slovan Liberec, with the club not losing any of the matches he took part in. For the first part of the 2010–11 season, Zich played for Sparta Prague's reserve team, but went on loan to Hradec Králové for the spring part of the season.
