= Patrik Vajda =

Slovak footballer

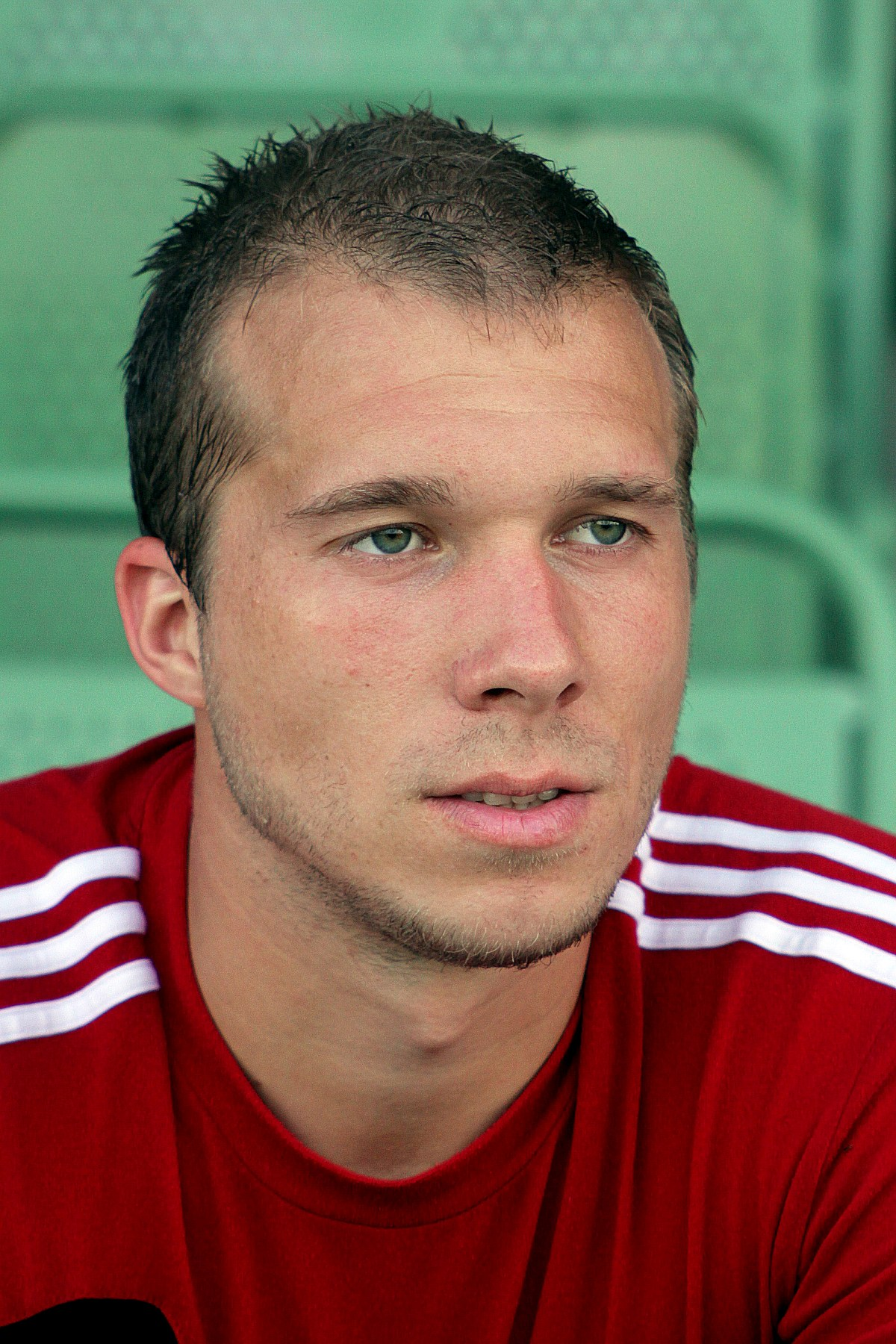

Personal information
- Date of birth: 20 March 1989 (age 37)
- Place of birth: Banská Bystrica, Czechoslovakia
- Height: 1.80 m (5 ft 11 in)
- Position: Defender

Team information
- Current team: OFK 1950 Priechod

Youth career
- Dukla Banská Bystrica

Senior career*
Years	Team	Apps	(Gls)
2009–2015	Dukla Banská Bystrica	90	(14)
2015–2017	ŽP ŠportPodbrezová	59	(6)
2017–2018	ETO Győr	1	(0)
2018–2022	Dukla Banská Bystrica	56	(3)
2022–2024	Zvolen		
2024–	OFK 1950 Priechod		
- * Club domestic league appearances and goals as of 29 July 2022

Patrik Vajda (born 20 March 1989) is a Slovak footballer who plays as a defender for OFK 1950 Priechod.
