= Fabián Slančík =

Slovak footballer (born 1991)

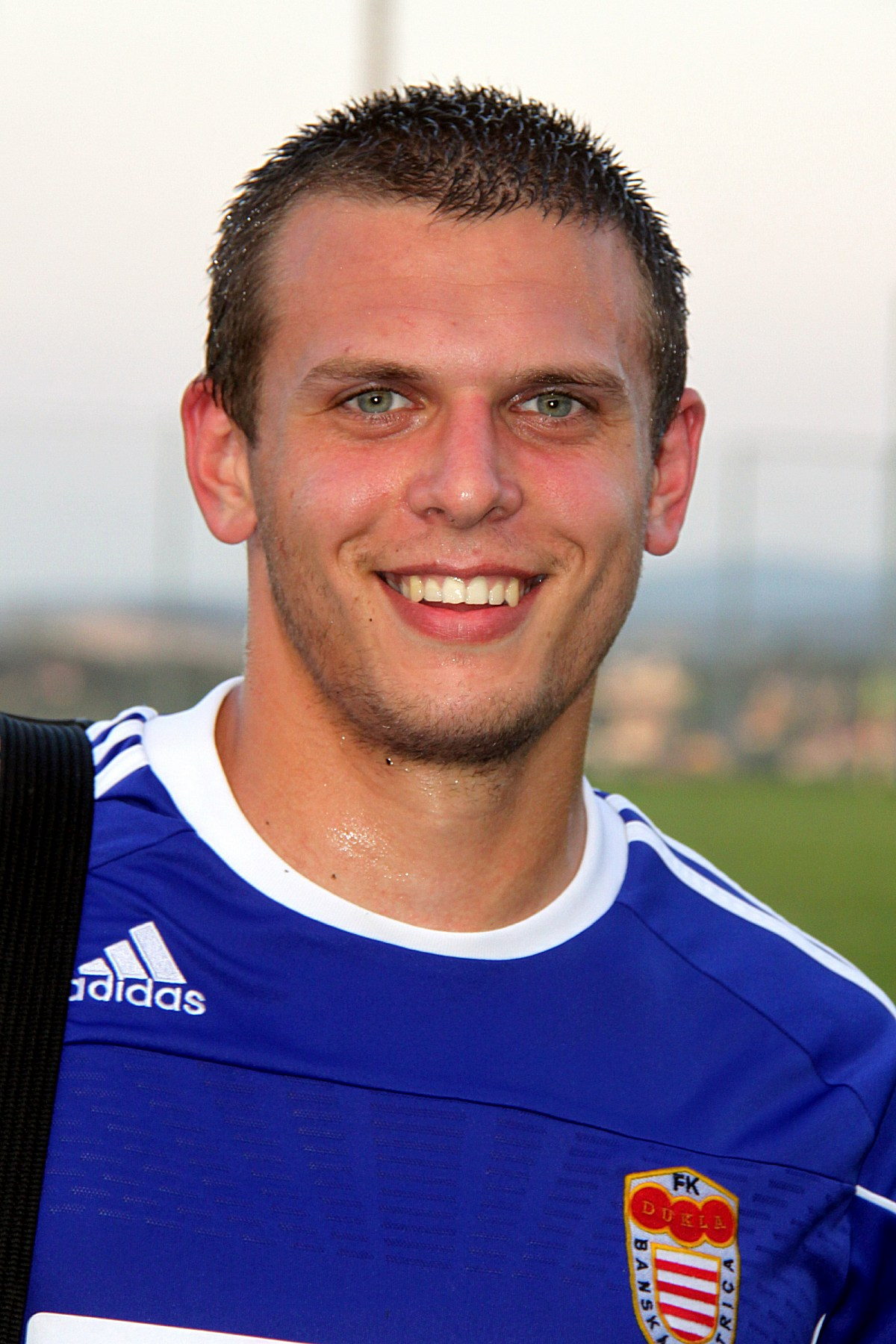

Personal information
- Full name: Fabián Slančík
- Date of birth: 22 September 1991 (age 35)
- Place of birth: Veľký Krtíš, Czechoslovakia
- Height: 1.77 m (5 ft 10 in)
- Position: Forward

Team information
- Current team: UFC Tadten
- Number: 15

Youth career
- 1998–2007: FC Baník Veľký Krtíš
- 2007–2010: Banská Bystrica

Senior career*
Years	Team	Apps	(Gls)
2010–2014	Banská Bystrica	78	(12)
2010	→ Lučenec (loan)	16	(4)
2014–2016	FC Zbrojovka Brno	10	(0)
2015	→ Spartak Myjava (loan)	13	(0)
2016	→ Zlaté Moravce (loan)	9	(0)
2016	Kremser SC	?	(?)
2017	Banská Bystrica	11	(1)
2017–	FK Slovenske Darmoty	?	(?)

International career
- Slovakia U-19
- * Club domestic league appearances and goals as of 11 April 2017 (UTC)

Fabián Slančík (born 22 September 1991) is a Slovak football forward who currently plays for FK Slovenske Darmoty.
