= Ján Nosko =

Slovak footballer

Personal information
- Full name: Ján Nosko
- Date of birth: 25 May 1988 (age 38)
- Place of birth: Brezno, Czechoslovakia
- Height: 1.96 m (6 ft 5 in)
- Position: Centre back

Team information
- Current team: Zvolen
- Number: 15

Youth career
- –2003: Spartak Závadka nad Hronom
- 2003–2007: ŽP Šport Podbrezová

Senior career*
Years	Team	Apps	(Gls)
2007–2016	ŽP Šport Podbrezová	?	(?)
2013–2014	→ Dukla Banská Bystrica (loan)	32	(0)
2015–2016	→ Pohronie (loan)	32	(4)
2016–2019	Pohronie	102	(5)
2020–2021	Dukla Banská Bystrica	30	(4)
2021	Sitno Banská Štiavnica	11	(1)
2022–	Zvolen	95	(10)
- * Club domestic league appearances and goals as of 17 May 2026

Ján Nosko (born 25 May 1988) is a Slovak football defender who currently plays for the 2. Liga club MFK Zvolen.

== Career ==
He made his professional debut for Dukla Banská Bystrica against Spartak Myjava on 12 July 2013.

Between 2015 and 2019, Nosko had spent 4,5 years playing with Pohronie, collecting some 140 competitive caps and scoring 11 competitive goals. He had won the 2. Liga with the club in the 2018–19 season, winning the club's first promotion to the Fortuna Liga.
