= Martin Chrien =

Slovak professional footballer

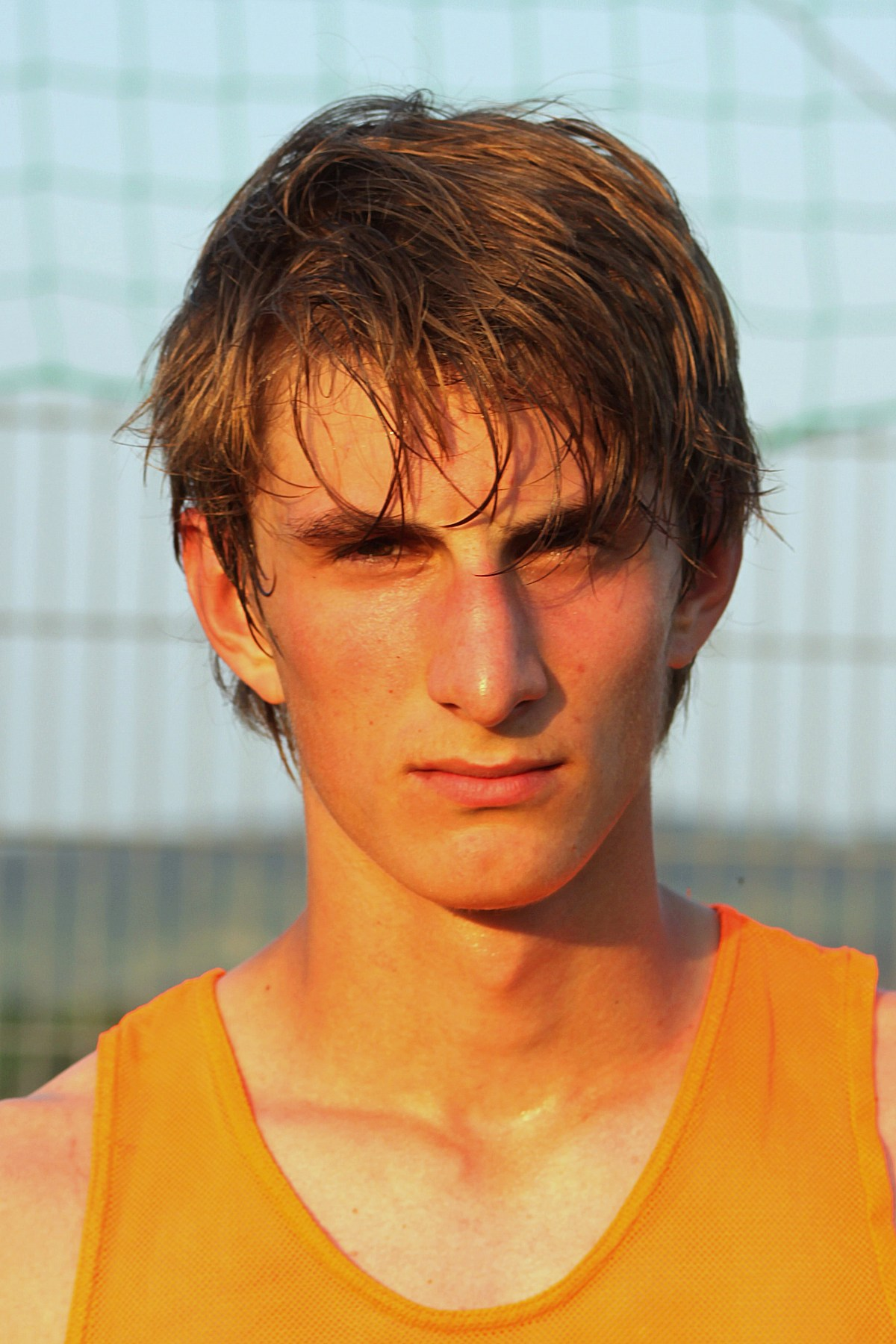
- Chrien with Dukla Banská Bystrica in 2013

Personal information
- Full name: Martin Chrien
- Date of birth: 8 September 1995 (age 31)
- Place of birth: Banská Bystrica, Slovakia
- Height: 1.82 m (6 ft 0 in)
- Position: Midfielder

Team information
- Current team: Podbrezová
- Number: 9

Youth career
- Dukla Banská Bystrica

Senior career*
Years	Team	Apps	(Gls)
2012–2014	Dukla Banská Bystrica	29	(5)
2014–2017	Viktoria Plzeň	3	(0)
2015	→ Dynamo České Budějovice (loan)	8	(0)
2015–2016	→ Zbrojovka Brno (loan)	24	(3)
2016	→ Ružomberok (loan)	17	(5)
2017	Benfica	1	(0)
2017–2020	Benfica B	29	(1)
2018–2019	→ Santa Clara (loan)	18	(1)
2021	Mezőkövesd	25	(1)
2022	Pohronie	7	(0)
2022–2026	Ružomberok	96	(12)
2026–	Podbrezová	9	(2)

International career^{‡}
2013–2014	Slovakia U19	3	(0)
2014–2018	Slovakia U21	21	(6)
2019	Slovakia	1	(1)
- * Club domestic league appearances and goals as of 21 September 2026 ‡ National team caps and goals as of 7 June 2019

Martin Chrien (Slovak pronunciation: [ˈmartiŋ ˈxrɪen]; born 8 September 1995) is a Slovak professional footballer who plays for Podbrezová as a midfielder.

== Club career ==
Born in Banská Bystrica, Chrien made his professional debut for the local club Dukla Banská Bystrica against Košice on 1 December. 2012.

On 14 May 2014, he signed a four-year contract with Czech club Viktoria Plzeň, joining the senior team at the start of the 2014–15 Czech First League.

On 29 June 2017, Chrien moved to Portugal and signed a five-year contract with defending champions Benfica Lisbon. The same year on 20 August, he made his 2017–18 Primeira Liga debut against Belenenses in a 5–0 victory, coming on in the 71st minute of the match. Due to lack of enough playing time, Chrien was linked with a loan move to Croatian clubs Hajduk Split and Osijek.

Chrien spent the 2018–19 season with Santa Clara, who returned to the top division after 15 years of absence.

In January 2020, Chrien signed with Mezőkövesd as a free agent, following low play in Benfica in 2020.

== International career ==
Chrien received his first call-up to the Slovak senior squad by Pavel Hapal for UEFA Euro 2020 qualifying fixture against Hungary and Wales. On 7 June 2019, Chrien debuted in a friendly match against Jordan as a starter, scoring the second goal which ended in a 5–1 victory for the Slovaks.

=== International goals ===
As of 7 June 2019 (Slovakia score listed first, score column indicates score after each Chrien goal)

No.	Date	Venue	Opponent	Score	Result	Competition
1.	7 June 2019	Anton Malatinský Stadium, Trnava, Slovakia	Jordan	2–1	5–1	Friendly
