= List of Slovak football transfers summer 2013 =

This is a list of Slovak football transfers in the summer transfer window 2013 by club. Only transfers of the Corgoň Liga and 2. liga are included.

== Corgoň Liga ==
=== ŠK Slovan Bratislava ===
In: Note: Flags indicate national team as defined under FIFA eligibility rules; some limited exceptions apply. Players may hold more than one non-FIFA nationality.

No.	Pos.	Nation	Player
—	DF	SRB	Miloš Josimov (from (Serbia) FK Donji Srem)
—	FW	SVK	Karol Mészáros (loan return from FC ViOn Zlaté Moravce)
—	GK	SVK	Martin Poláček (loan return from FK DAC 1904 Dunajská Streda)
—	MF	SVK	Matej Jakúbek (from MFK Dubnica)
—	DF	SVK	Martin Vrablec (loan return from ŠK SFM Senec)
—	FW	CZE	Pavel Fořt (from (Germany) Dynamo Dresden)
33	FW	SVK	Róbert Vittek (from Free Agent)
—	GK	SVK	Dušan Perniš (from Free Agent)

Out: Note: Flags indicate national team as defined under FIFA eligibility rules; some limited exceptions apply. Players may hold more than one non-FIFA nationality.

No.	Pos.	Nation	Player
1	GK	SVK	Pavel Kováč (loan return to MFK Dubnica)
2	DF	SVK	Filip Lukšík (loan return to (Netherlands) ADO Den Haag)
25	DF	SVK	Lukáš Pauschek (to (Czech Republic) AC Sparta Prague)
—	MF	SVK	Patrik Sabo (on loan to FC ViOn Zlaté Moravce)
—	MF	SVK	Róbert Vaniš (on loan to FC ViOn Zlaté Moravce)
—	DF	SVK	Dávid Hudák (on loan to FK DAC 1904 Dunajská Streda)
—	FW	SVK	Ákos Szarka (on loan to FK DAC 1904 Dunajská Streda)
—	GK	SVK	Dušan Perniš (on loan to FC Nitra)

=== FK Senica ===
In: Note: Flags indicate national team as defined under FIFA eligibility rules; some limited exceptions apply. Players may hold more than one non-FIFA nationality.

No.	Pos.	Nation	Player
30	GK	SVK	Ján Malec (loan return from FK DAC 1904 Dunajská Streda)
3	DF	CZE	Pavel Čermák (from (Czech Republic) FK Viktoria Žižkov)
9	FW	SVK	Alexander Jakubov (on loan from (Czech Republic) AC Sparta Prague)
10	FW	BRA	Hiago (on loan from (Brazil) Arapongas)
12	DF	BRA	Cristovam (on loan from (Brazil) Arapongas)
21	MF	CZE	Martin Zeman (on loan from (Czech Republic) AC Sparta Prague)
23	MF	SVK	Lukáš Opiela (from (Czech Republic) FK Mladá Boleslav)
5	DF	SVK	Michal Habánek (on loan from FC Spartak Trnava)
11	FW	CGO	Juvhel Tsoumou (from (Austria) TSV Hartberg)

Out: Note: Flags indicate national team as defined under FIFA eligibility rules; some limited exceptions apply. Players may hold more than one non-FIFA nationality.

No.	Pos.	Nation	Player
2	DF	SVK	Patrik Mráz (to (Poland) Górnik Łęczna)
3	DF	SVK	Ján Gajdošík (to ŽP Šport Podbrezová)
5	DF	SVK	Matej Krajčík (End of contract)
7	FW	PAN	Rolando Blackburn (loan return to (Panama) Chorrillo F.C.)
9	MF	SVK	Martin Ďurica (End of contract)
12	MF	NED	Stef Wijlaars (to (Czech Republic) SK Sigma Olomouc)
17	DF	SVK	Róbert Pillár (on loan to (Czech Republic) FC Hradec Králové)
20	FW	SVK	Pavol Masaryk (End of contract)
21	MF	SVK	Peter Štepanovský (on loan to FC Spartak Trnava)
23	MF	SVK	Martin Babic (loan return to FC ViOn Zlaté Moravce)
29	GK	CZE	Milan Švenger (loan return to (Czech Republic) AC Sparta Prague)

=== FK AS Trenčín ===
In: Note: Flags indicate national team as defined under FIFA eligibility rules; some limited exceptions apply. Players may hold more than one non-FIFA nationality.

No.	Pos.	Nation	Player
—	MF	SVK	Adam Morong (loan return from MFK Tatran Liptovský Mikuláš)
—	FW	SVK	Tomáš Malec (loan return from MFK Tatran Liptovský Mikuláš)
—	FW	SVK	Gabriel Bezák (loan return from FK Slovan Nemšová)
—	DF	SRB	Milan Rundić (from (Croatia) NK Inter Zaprešić)
—	FW	BIH	Haris Hajradinović (from (Croatia) NK Inter Zaprešić)
—	FW	SVK	Patrik Mišák (from AFC Nové Mesto nad Váhom)
—	FW	NED	Gino van Kessel (on loan from (Netherlands) AFC Ajax)

Out: Note: Flags indicate national team as defined under FIFA eligibility rules; some limited exceptions apply. Players may hold more than one non-FIFA nationality.

No.	Pos.	Nation	Player
9	FW	SVK	František Kubík (to (Ukraine) Arsenal Kyiv)
12	FW	NGR	Fanendo Adi (to (Denmark) F.C. Copenhagen)
18	MF	SVK	Lukáš Ďuriška (on loan to (Malta) Mosta F.C.)
26	MF	SVK	Samuel Štefánik (to (Netherlands) NEC)
29	MF	SVK	Stanislav Lobotka (on loan to (Netherlands) AFC Ajax)
—	MF	SVK	Peter Mazan (on loan to FC ViOn Zlaté Moravce)

=== Spartak Myjava ===
In: Note: Flags indicate national team as defined under FIFA eligibility rules; some limited exceptions apply. Players may hold more than one non-FIFA nationality.

No.	Pos.	Nation	Player
—	MF	SVK	Ondrej Neoveský (loan return from ŠK SFM Senec)
—	DF	SVK	Marcel Onder (loan return from OTJ Moravany nad Váhom)
—	MF	SVK	Štefan Pekár (from MFK Ružomberok)
—	MF	SVK	Peter Šulek (from MŠK Žilina)
—	DF	SVK	Filip Lukšík (from (Netherlands) ADO Den Haag)

Out: Note: Flags indicate national team as defined under FIFA eligibility rules; some limited exceptions apply. Players may hold more than one non-FIFA nationality.

No.	Pos.	Nation	Player
9	FW	SVK	Zoltán Harsányi (loan return to (Hungary) Pécsi MFC)
18	MF	SVK	Peter Ďuriš (Released)
22	DF	SVK	Tomáš Mrva (Released)
—	MF	SVK	Peter Šulek (loan return to MŠK Žilina)

=== MFK Košice ===
In: Note: Flags indicate national team as defined under FIFA eligibility rules; some limited exceptions apply. Players may hold more than one non-FIFA nationality.

No.	Pos.	Nation	Player
—	FW	SVK	Erik Pačinda (loan return from (France) Tours FC)
—	FW	SVK	Tomáš Kubík (loan return from MŠK Rimavská Sobota)
—	MF	SVK	Kamil Kuzma (loan return from ŠK SFM Senec)
—	DF	SVK	Ľubomír Korijkov (loan return from MFK Zemplín Michalovce)
—	FW	BIH	Nermin Haskić (from (Serbia) FK Voždovac)
—	DF	SRB	Lazar Đorđević (from (North Macedonia) FK Sileks)
37	FW	SVK	Ján Novák (on loan from 1. FC Tatran Prešov)

Out: Note: Flags indicate national team as defined under FIFA eligibility rules; some limited exceptions apply. Players may hold more than one non-FIFA nationality.

No.	Pos.	Nation	Player
17	MF	SVK	Peter Gál-Andrezly (End of contract)
23	MF	SRB	Uroš Matić (to (Portugal) Benfica)
24	MF	SVK	Kamil Karaš (End of contract and he joined to (Czech Republic) SK Sigma Olomouc)
—	MF	SVK	Kamil Kuzma (End of contract and he joined to FC Spartak Trnava)
—	GK	SVK	Roland Repiský (End of contract)

=== MFK Ružomberok ===
In: Note: Flags indicate national team as defined under FIFA eligibility rules; some limited exceptions apply. Players may hold more than one non-FIFA nationality.

No.	Pos.	Nation	Player
—	FW	SVK	Štefan Gerec (loan return from FK DAC 1904 Dunajská Streda)
—	MF	SVK	Tomáš Gerát (loan return from FK DAC 1904 Dunajská Streda)
—	DF	SVK	Michal Kutlík (loan return from FK DAC 1904 Dunajská Streda)
—	DF	SVK	Jaroslav Kostelný (loan return from (Czech Republic) SFC Opava)
—	MF	SVK	Štefan Zošák (from MŠK Žilina)
—	MF	CMR	Léandre Tawamba (from FC Nitra)
—	DF	SRB	Goran Adamović (from (Serbia) FK Spartak Zlatibor Voda)
—	GK	SRB	Milorad Nikolić (from (Serbia) FK Javor Ivanjica)
—	DF	SVK	Michal Janec (on loan from (Czech Republic) FC Slovan Liberec)
—	FW	SVK	Miloš Lačný (from Free Agent)
—	DF	BIH	Adi Mehremić (from (Bosnia and Herzegovina) FK Olimpic)

Out: Note: Flags indicate national team as defined under FIFA eligibility rules; some limited exceptions apply. Players may hold more than one non-FIFA nationality.

No.	Pos.	Nation	Player
1	GK	CZE	Lukáš Zich (to TBA)
5	MF	SVK	Lukáš Bielák (to (Poland) Bogdanka Łęczna)
8	DF	SVK	Martin Jurkemik (End of contract)
15	DF	SVK	Jakub Janso (End of contract)
19	MF	SVK	Štefan Pekár (to Spartak Myjava)
22	FW	COD	Mulumba Mukendi (to (Russia) FC Volga Nizhny Novgorod)

=== MŠK Žilina ===
In: Note: Flags indicate national team as defined under FIFA eligibility rules; some limited exceptions apply. Players may hold more than one non-FIFA nationality.

No.	Pos.	Nation	Player
—	MF	SVK	Milan Škriniar (loan return from FC ViOn Zlaté Moravce)
—	MF	SVK	Štefan Zošák (loan return from FC Nitra)
—	MF	SVK	Roman Gergel (loan return from 1. FC Tatran Prešov)
—	FW	SVK	René Dedič (loan return from FC ŠTK 1914 Šamorín)
—	DF	SVK	Dušan Kucharčík (loan return from MFK Tatran Liptovský Mikuláš)
—	MF	SVK	René Revák (loan return from MFK Tatran Liptovský Mikuláš)
—	MF	SVK	Peter Šulek (loan return from Spartak Myjava)
—	DF	SVK	Marcel Ondráš (loan return from FC ViOn Zlaté Moravce)
—	FW	CRO	Matej Jelić (from (Croatia) NK Rudeš)
—	MF	SVK	Tomáš Hučko (from FK Dukla Banská Bystrica)

Out: Note: Flags indicate national team as defined under FIFA eligibility rules; some limited exceptions apply. Players may hold more than one non-FIFA nationality.

No.	Pos.	Nation	Player
2	DF	SVK	Stanislav Angelovič (End of contract)
10	MF	SVK	Miroslav Barčík (End of contract)
—	MF	SVK	Peter Šulek (to Spartak Myjava)
—	DF	SVK	Marcel Ondráš (on loan to MFK Dubnica)

=== FC ViOn Zlaté Moravce ===
In: Note: Flags indicate national team as defined under FIFA eligibility rules; some limited exceptions apply. Players may hold more than one non-FIFA nationality.

No.	Pos.	Nation	Player
—	MF	SVK	Martin Babic (loan return from FK Senica)
—	MF	SVK	Juraj Tomášek (loan return from ŠK SFM Senec)
—	MF	SVK	Juraj Pilát (loan return from ŠKF Sereď)
—	DF	SVK	Peter Farkaš (loan return from FK Spartak Vráble)
—	MF	SVK	Mário Kajaba (loan return from FK Spartak Vráble)
—	FW	SVK	Ladislav Žák (loan return from AFC Nové Mesto nad Váhom)
—	MF	SVK	Martin Pribula (on loan from 1. FC Tatran Prešov)
—	MF	SVK	Michal Obročník (on loan from (Czech Republic) FC Slovan Liberec)
—	FW	SRB	Samir Nurković (on loan from MFK Košice)
—	MF	SVK	Patrik Sabo (on loan from ŠK Slovan Bratislava)
—	MF	SVK	Róbert Vaniš (on loan from ŠK Slovan Bratislava)
—	MF	SVK	Peter Mazan (on loan from FK AS Trenčín)
—	DF	SVK	Peter Chrappan (on loan from FK Dukla Banská Bystrica)
—	FW	SVK	Lukáš Szabo (on loan from (Czech Republic) FC Slovan Liberec)

Out: Note: Flags indicate national team as defined under FIFA eligibility rules; some limited exceptions apply. Players may hold more than one non-FIFA nationality.

No.	Pos.	Nation	Player
—	FW	SVK	Karol Mészáros (loan return to ŠK Slovan Bratislava)
—	MF	SVK	Milan Škriniar (loan return to MŠK Žilina)
—	MF	SVK	Michal Obročník (loan return to (Czech Republic) FC Slovan Liberec)
—	FW	SVK	Andrej Hodek (to FC Spartak Trnava)
—	DF	SVK	Marcel Ondráš (loan return to MŠK Žilina)
—	FW	SRB	Samir Nurković (Released)

=== FK Dukla Banská Bystrica ===
In: Note: Flags indicate national team as defined under FIFA eligibility rules; some limited exceptions apply. Players may hold more than one non-FIFA nationality.

No.	Pos.	Nation	Player
—	FW	SVK	Patrik Johancsik (loan return from FK DAC 1904 Dunajská Streda)
—	FW	SVK	Pavol Jurčo (on loan from MFK Zemplín Michalovce)
—	DF	SVK	Ján Nosko (on loan from ŽP Šport Podbrezová)
—	GK	CZE	Dominik Rodinger (on loan from (Czech Republic) FK Bohemians Prague)
—	MF	SVK	Jakub Hronec (on loan from MFK Dolný Kubín)
—	DF	SVK	Peter Chrappan (from (Malaysia) Selangor FA)
—	FW	SVK	Matúš Marcin (on loan from (Czech Republic) FC Vysočina Jihlava)
—	DF	ITA	Marco De Vito (from (Croatia) NK Imotski)

Out: Note: Flags indicate national team as defined under FIFA eligibility rules; some limited exceptions apply. Players may hold more than one non-FIFA nationality.

No.	Pos.	Nation	Player
3	MF	SVK	Tomáš Hučko (to MŠK Žilina)
4	DF	SVK	Martin Poljovka (End of professional career)
6	DF	SVK	Norbert Gyömbér (to (Italy) Calcio Catania)
14	MF	SVK	Michal Pančík (to ŽP Šport Podbrezová)
25	DF	SVK	Jozef Adámik (to FC Spartak Trnava)
28	FW	CZE	Pavel Vrána (End of contract)
33	MF	SVK	Marek Hlinka (to (Czech Republic) FK Dukla Prague)
—	FW	SVK	Patrik Johancsik (to (Austria) FC Stadlau)
—	DF	SVK	Peter Chrappan (on loan to FC ViOn Zlaté Moravce)
—	GK	SVK	Tomáš Belic (to FK DAC 1904 Dunajská Streda)

=== FC Nitra ===
In: Note: Flags indicate national team as defined under FIFA eligibility rules; some limited exceptions apply. Players may hold more than one non-FIFA nationality.

No.	Pos.	Nation	Player
—	FW	SVK	Matúš Paukner (loan return from Partizán Bardejov)
—	MF	SVK	Andrej Ivančík (loan return from FK Slovan Duslo Šaľa)
—	DF	CZE	Martin Hála (on loan from (Czech Republic) SK Sigma Olomouc)
—	FW	CZE	Adam Ševčík (on loan from (Czech Republic) SK Sigma Olomouc)
—	FW	SVK	Emil Le Giang (on loan from FTC Fiľakovo)
—	DF	ESP	Eric Barroso (from (Spain) CD San Fernando)
—	GK	SVK	Dušan Perniš (on loan from ŠK Slovan Bratislava)
—	DF	SVK	Jaroslav Kolbas (on loan from 1. FC Tatran Prešov)
—	MF	SVK	Adrián Čermák (on loan from ŠK Slovan Bratislava)
—	MF	SVK	Tomáš Bagi (on loan from ŠK Slovan Bratislava)

Out: Note: Flags indicate national team as defined under FIFA eligibility rules; some limited exceptions apply. Players may hold more than one non-FIFA nationality.

No.	Pos.	Nation	Player
3	DF	SRB	Miloš Obradović (End of contract)
9	MF	SVK	Martin Jackuliak (loan return to ŠK Slovan Bratislava)
16	DF	SVK	Peter Struhár (to (Hungary) Lombard-Pápa TFC)
17	DF	SVK	Róbert Cicman (loan return to (Czech Republic) SK Slavia Prague)
19	FW	SVK	Henrich Benčík (to (Germany) SV Wacker Burghausen)
21	MF	CMR	Léandre Tawamba (to MFK Ružomberok)
24	MF	SVK	Štefan Zošák (loan return to MŠK Žilina)
31	GK	SVK	Lukáš Hroššo (to (Czech Republic) FC Slovan Liberec)
—	MF	SVK	Emil Le Giang (loan return to FTC Fiľakovo)

=== FC Spartak Trnava ===
In: Note: Flags indicate national team as defined under FIFA eligibility rules; some limited exceptions apply. Players may hold more than one non-FIFA nationality.

No.	Pos.	Nation	Player
—	DF	SVK	Jozef Adámik (from FK Dukla Banská Bystrica)
11	MF	SVK	Ján Chovanec (on loan from (Czech Republic) FK Teplice)
—	FW	SVK	Andrej Hodek (from FC ViOn Zlaté Moravce)
—	MF	SVK	Roman Procházka (on loan from (Bulgaria) PFC Levski Sofia)
—	MF	SVK	Peter Štepanovský (on loan from FK Senica)
—	MF	SVK	Kamil Kuzma (from MFK Košice)
5	DF	SRB	Srdjan Grabež (from MFK Dubnica)
—	DF	SVK	Martin Tóth (from Free Agent)
—	MF	SLO	Matic Maruško (from Free Agent)
—	DF	BIH	Damir Mirvić (from (Belgium) C.S. Visé)
—	FW	CZE	Tomáš Poznar (from (Czech Republic) FC Fastav Zlín)
—	MF	MKD	Dejan Peševski (from Free Agent)
—	GK	SVK	Michal Hrivňák (from (Scotland) Dunfermline Athletic)
—	FW	NGR	Peter Nworah (from 1. FC Tatran Prešov)

Out: Note: Flags indicate national team as defined under FIFA eligibility rules; some limited exceptions apply. Players may hold more than one non-FIFA nationality.

No.	Pos.	Nation	Player
5	DF	SRB	Srdjan Grabež (loan return to MFK Dubnica)
11	FW	SVK	Karol Pavelka (Released)
12	FW	SVK	Ladislav Tomaček (Released)
17	MF	SVK	Patrik Čarnota (End of contract)
20	DF	CZE	Patrik Gross (End of contract)
22	GK	CZE	Martin Raška (End of contract)
27	GK	SVK	Mário Bicák (Released)
29	MF	SVK	Marek Kaščák (End of contract)
30	MF	SVK	Ivan Hodúr (Released)
39	FW	SVK	Ivan Lietava (Released)
40	GK	SVK	Jakub Jakubov (Loan return)
—	MF	SVK	Ján Petráš (Released)
—	MF	SVK	Michal Gašparík (Released)
—	MF	CZE	Martin Vyskočil (on loan to (Czech Republic) SK Dynamo České Budějovice)
—	MF	MKD	Dejan Peševski (Released)

=== FK DAC 1904 Dunajská Streda ===
In: Note: Flags indicate national team as defined under FIFA eligibility rules; some limited exceptions apply. Players may hold more than one non-FIFA nationality.

No.	Pos.	Nation	Player
—	GK	SVK	Andrej Fišan (from (Czech Republic) FC MAS Táborsko)
—	MF	SVK	Ivan Hodúr (from FC Spartak Trnava)
—	MF	SVK	Erik Ujlaky (from (Czech Republic) AC Sparta Prague)
—	FW	SVK	Ákos Szarka (on loan from ŠK Slovan Bratislava)
—	MF	SVK	Michal Dian (on loan from Spartak Myjava)
—	GK	SVK	Andrej Pernecký (from (Czech Republic) FK Viktoria Žižkov)
—	GK	SVK	Tomáš Belic (from FK Dukla Banská Bystrica)
—	FW	TUN	Nizar Ben Nasra (from (Norway) Nesodden IF)
—	MF	SVK	Michal Gašparík (on loan from (Bulgaria) PFC Lokomotiv Sofia)
—	FW	BIH	Muris Mešanović (on loan from (Czech Republic) FC Vysočina Jihlava)
—	FW	SVK	Martin Matúš (on loan from FK REaMOS Kysucký Lieskovec)
—	MF	CMR	Noé Kwin (from (Serbia) Spartak Subotica)
—	DF	BRA	Gabriel (from (Czech Republic) FC Vysočina Jihlava)
—	DF	SVK	Dávid Hudák (on loan to ŠK Slovan Bratislava)
—	FW	SVK	Ákos Szarka (on loan to ŠK Slovan Bratislava)
—	MF	SVK	Christián Steinhübel (on loan to FC Spartak Trnava)

Out: Note: Flags indicate national team as defined under FIFA eligibility rules; some limited exceptions apply. Players may hold more than one non-FIFA nationality.

No.	Pos.	Nation	Player
—	GK	SVK	Martin Poláček (loan return to ŠK Slovan Bratislava)
—	GK	SVK	Ján Malec (loan return to FK Senica)
—	FW	SVK	Štefan Gerec (loan return to MFK Ružomberok)
—	MF	SVK	Tomáš Gerát (loan return to MFK Ružomberok)
—	DF	SVK	Michal Kutlík (loan return to MFK Ružomberok)
24	FW	SVK	Patrik Johancsik (loan return to FK Dukla Banská Bystrica)
—	MF	SVK	Ivan Hodúr (Suspended)
—	MF	SVK	Michal Dian (Suspended and released)
—	DF	SVK	Marek Božoň (Suspended)
—	DF	CZE	Tomáš Huber (Suspended)
—	MF	SVK	Branislav Fodrek (Released)
—	MF	SVK	Branislav Obžera (Released)
—	GK	SVK	Andrej Fišan (Released)
—	MF	SVK	Stanislav Velický (Released)
—	MF	CMR	Akwo Tarh Ayuk Taku (to (France) A.F.C. Holnon Fayet)

== 2. liga ==
=== 1. FC Tatran Prešov ===
In: Note: Flags indicate national team as defined under FIFA eligibility rules; some limited exceptions apply. Players may hold more than one non-FIFA nationality.

No.	Pos.	Nation	Player
—	MF	SVK	Peter Katona (loan return from MŠK Rimavská Sobota)
—	FW	NGR	Peter Nworah (loan return from Partizán Bardejov)
—	MF	SVK	Martin Pribula (loan return from MŠK Rimavská Sobota)
—	GK	SVK	Jozef Talian (loan return from OŠFK Šarišské Michaľany)
—	MF	SVK	Dávid Leško (loan return from OŠFK Šarišské Michaľany)
—	DF	SVK	Peter Zbiňovský (from OŠFK Šarišské Michaľany)
—	DF	SVK	Ján Hatok (loan return from MFK Vranov nad Topľou)

Out: Note: Flags indicate national team as defined under FIFA eligibility rules; some limited exceptions apply. Players may hold more than one non-FIFA nationality.

No.	Pos.	Nation	Player
8	MF	SVK	Radoslav Augustín (loan return to ŠK Slovan Bratislava)
16	FW	SVK	Matúš Marcin (to (Czech Republic) FC Vysočina Jihlava)
23	GK	CZE	Jakub Diviš (End of contract)
30	GK	CZE	Jakub Plánička (Released)
42	MF	SVK	Roman Gergel (loan return to MŠK Žilina)
44	MF	UKR	Andriy Yakovlev (End of contract)
87	DF	CZE	Jan Krob (on loan to (Czech Republic) FK Teplice)
84	DF	SVK	Miloš Brezinský (Released)
88	FW	BRA	Mariano Bernardo (End of contract)
—	MF	SVK	Martin Pribula (on loan to FC ViOn Zlaté Moravce)
—	MF	SVK	Viliam Macko (to (Thailand) Ang Thong F.C.)
—	FW	SVK	Ján Novák (on loan to MFK Košice)
—	FW	NGR	Peter Nworah (to FC Spartak Trnava)

=== ŽP Šport Podbrezová ===
In: Note: Flags indicate national team as defined under FIFA eligibility rules; some limited exceptions apply. Players may hold more than one non-FIFA nationality.

No.	Pos.	Nation	Player
—	MF	SVK	Michal Pančík (from FK Dukla Banská Bystrica)
—	MF	SVK	Štefan Gerec (on loan from MFK Ružomberok)

Out: Note: Flags indicate national team as defined under FIFA eligibility rules; some limited exceptions apply. Players may hold more than one non-FIFA nationality.

No.	Pos.	Nation	Player
—	DF	SVK	Ján Nosko (on loan to FK Dukla Banská Bystrica)
—	DF	SVK	Marián Ferenc (on loan to MFK Tatran Liptovský Mikuláš)
—	FW	SVK	Lukáš Laksík (loan return to FK Dukla Banská Bystrica)
—	MF	SVK	Denis Polaščík (loan return to MŠK Tesla Stropkov)

=== ŠK SFM Senec ===
In: Note: Flags indicate national team as defined under FIFA eligibility rules; some limited exceptions apply. Players may hold more than one non-FIFA nationality.

No.	Pos.	Nation	Player
—	MF	SVK	Radoslav Augustín (on loan from ŠK Slovan Bratislava)
—	DF	SVK	Martin Jurkemik (from MFK Ružomberok)
—	DF	SVK	Roman Čejtei (on loan from ŠK Slovan Bratislava)
—	MF	SVK	Dezider Egri (on loan from TJ Družstevník Vrakúň)
—	DF	SVK	Lukáš Hlavatovič (from FC Spartak Trnava)

Out: Note: Flags indicate national team as defined under FIFA eligibility rules; some limited exceptions apply. Players may hold more than one non-FIFA nationality.

No.	Pos.	Nation	Player
—	MF	SVK	Kamil Kuzma (loan return to MFK Košice)
—	MF	SVK	Ondrej Neoveský (loan return to Spartak Myjava)
—	DF	SVK	Martin Vrablec (loan return to ŠK Slovan Bratislava)
—	DF	SVK	Lukáš Hlavatovič (loan return to FC Spartak Trnava)

=== Partizán Bardejov ===
In: Note: Flags indicate national team as defined under FIFA eligibility rules; some limited exceptions apply. Players may hold more than one non-FIFA nationality.

No.	Pos.	Nation	Player
—	FW	SVK	Norbert Sališ (loan return from TJ Javorina Malcov)

Out: Note: Flags indicate national team as defined under FIFA eligibility rules; some limited exceptions apply. Players may hold more than one non-FIFA nationality.

No.	Pos.	Nation	Player
—	FW	NGR	Peter Nworah (loan return to 1. FC Tatran Prešov)
—	FW	SVK	Matúš Paukner (loan return to FC Nitra)
—	FW	SVK	Marko Lukáč (loan return to ŽP Šport Podbrezová)
—	MF	SVK	Marek Seman (Released)
—	MF	SVK	František Kundra (Released)

=== FC ŠTK 1914 Šamorín ===
In: Note: Flags indicate national team as defined under FIFA eligibility rules; some limited exceptions apply. Players may hold more than one non-FIFA nationality.

No.	Pos.	Nation	Player
—	DF	MKD	Filip Gligorov (on loan from FK Podkonice)
—	FW	GUI	Seybou Sidibe (on loan from ŠK Slovan Bratislava)
—	MF	CAN	Andrew Kliment (on loan from MFK Dolný Kubín)
—	GK	SVK	Lukáš Jamroškovič (on loan from MŠK Tesla Stropkov)
—	FW	SVK	Michal Vilkovský (on loan from FK Senica)
—	FW	SLO	Peter Stojanovič (from (Serbia) FK Bežanija)
—	DF	SVK	Patrik Gregora (on loan from ŠK Slovan Bratislava)

Out: Note: Flags indicate national team as defined under FIFA eligibility rules; some limited exceptions apply. Players may hold more than one non-FIFA nationality.

No.	Pos.	Nation	Player
—	FW	SVK	René Dedič (loan return to MŠK Žilina)
—	FW	CMR	Serge Messie Tanguy (Released)
—	FW	SRB	Danijel Savić (Released)
—	GK	SVK	Peter Gábriš (Released)
—	DF	SVK	Martin Staško (Released)
—	MF	SVK	Andrej Urban (loan return to MFK Dubnica)

=== FK Slovan Duslo Šaľa ===
In: Note: Flags indicate national team as defined under FIFA eligibility rules; some limited exceptions apply. Players may hold more than one non-FIFA nationality.

No.	Pos.	Nation	Player
—	MF	FRA	Fabrice Numéric (return after the injury from (France) )
—	DF	SVK	Matúš Kochan (loan return from FK AS Trenčín)
—	FW	COD	Lewis Mukalenga (loan return from FC Jelka)

Out: Note: Flags indicate national team as defined under FIFA eligibility rules; some limited exceptions apply. Players may hold more than one non-FIFA nationality.

No.	Pos.	Nation	Player
—	FW	SVK	Lukáš Szabo (to (Czech Republic) FC Slovan Liberec)
—	MF	SVK	Andrej Ivančík (loan return to FC Nitra)
—	MF	SVK	Róbert Glenda (loan return to FC Nitra)

=== MFK Zemplín Michalovce ===
In: Note: Flags indicate national team as defined under FIFA eligibility rules; some limited exceptions apply. Players may hold more than one non-FIFA nationality.

No.	Pos.	Nation	Player
—	MF	SVK	Lukáš Janič (from (Czech Republic) FK Teplice)
—	GK	CZE	Martin Raška (from Free Agent)
2	DF	SVK	Michal Gallo (from (Czech Republic) FC MAS Táborsko)
19	DF	SVK	Igor Obert (from (Czech Republic) FC Vysočina Jihlava)

Out: Note: Flags indicate national team as defined under FIFA eligibility rules; some limited exceptions apply. Players may hold more than one non-FIFA nationality.

No.	Pos.	Nation	Player
—	DF	SVK	Ľubomír Korijkov (loan return to MFK Košice)
—	GK	SVK	Miloslav Bréda (End of contract)
—	DF	CZE	Luboš Hruška (End of contract)
—	FW	SVK	Pavol Jurčo (on loan to FK Dukla Banská Bystrica)
—	FW	ESP	Juanpe (End of contract)
—	FW	RUS	Denis Mukhamedinov (End of contract)

=== MŠK Rimavská Sobota ===
In: Note: Flags indicate national team as defined under FIFA eligibility rules; some limited exceptions apply. Players may hold more than one non-FIFA nationality.

No.	Pos.	Nation	Player
—	DF	SVK	Martin Hruboš (on loan from MŠK Žilina)
—	MF	SVK	Lukáš Jánošík (on loan from MŠK Žilina)
—	DF	SVK	Jaroslav Poliach (on loan from FK Dukla Banská Bystrica)
—	FW	SVK	Martin Válovčan (on loan from FK Dukla Banská Bystrica)
—	DF	SVK	Miroslav Gálik (on loan from FK Dukla Banská Bystrica)
—	FW	SVK	Ján Kostúrik (on loan from ŽP Šport Podbrezová)
—	MF	SVK	Mário Kurák (on loan from (Hungary) Kaposvári Rákóczi FC)

Out: Note: Flags indicate national team as defined under FIFA eligibility rules; some limited exceptions apply. Players may hold more than one non-FIFA nationality.

No.	Pos.	Nation	Player
—	FW	SVK	Tomáš Kubík (loan return to MFK Košice)
—	MF	SVK	Peter Katona (loan return to 1. FC Tatran Prešov)
—	MF	SVK	Martin Pribula (loan return to 1. FC Tatran Prešov)
—	MF	SVK	Marián Adam (loan return to 1. FC Tatran Prešov)
—	DF	SVK	Lukáš Mravec (loan return to MŠK Žilina)
—	DF	SVK	Martin Poleť (loan return to MŠK Žilina)
—	MF	SVK	Tomáš Labun (loan return to MFK Tatran Liptovský Mikuláš)
—	MF	SVK	Štefan Rubint (loan return to FTC Fiľakovo)
—	MF	SVK	Matej Vargic (to (Austria) ASC Götzendorf)

=== MFK Dubnica ===
In: Note: Flags indicate national team as defined under FIFA eligibility rules; some limited exceptions apply. Players may hold more than one non-FIFA nationality.

No.	Pos.	Nation	Player
1	GK	SVK	Pavel Kováč (loan return from ŠK Slovan Bratislava)
—	MF	SVK	Andrej Urban (loan return from FC ŠTK 1914 Šamorín)
—	DF	SVK	Marek Púpala (on loan from FK Dukla Banská Bystrica)
—	DF	SVK	Marcel Ondráš (on loan from MŠK Žilina)
—	DF	SVK	Ivan Múdry (from (Austria) SV Bad Ischl)
—	MF	SVK	Erik Liener (from FC Baník Horná Nitra)
—	MF	SRB	Mihajilo Popović (from (Belgium) K.A.S. Eupen)
—	DF	SVK	Michal Ranko (on loan from FK AS Trenčín)

Out: Note: Flags indicate national team as defined under FIFA eligibility rules; some limited exceptions apply. Players may hold more than one non-FIFA nationality.

No.	Pos.	Nation	Player
—	MF	SVK	Matej Jakúbek (to ŠK Slovan Bratislava)
—	MF	SVK	Martin Valjent (to (Italy) Ternana Calcio)
—	DF	SEN	Djiby Ba (loan return to FC Spartak Trnava)
—	MF	SVK	Christián Steinhübel (loan return to FC Spartak Trnava)
—	MF	SVK	Michal Dolinajec (loan return to MFK Dolný Kubín)

=== MFK Tatran Liptovský Mikuláš ===
In: Note: Flags indicate national team as defined under FIFA eligibility rules; some limited exceptions apply. Players may hold more than one non-FIFA nationality.

No.	Pos.	Nation	Player
—	FW	SVK	Andrej Brčák (on loan from FK Nižná)
—	DF	SVK	Marián Ferenc (on loan from ŽP Šport Podbrezová)
—	FW	SVK	Július Gombala (on loan from ŽP Šport Podbrezová)
—	FW	UKR	Viktor Sakhniuk (from (Ukraine) FC Arsenal Kyiv)
—	DF	SVK	Ján Mizerák (from 1. FC Tatran Prešov)
—	DF	SVK	Ján Jurky (on loan from MFK Dolný Kubín)
—	MF	SVK	Peter Hoferica (from (Czech Republic) MFK OKD Karviná)
—	FW	SVK	Dennis Christu (from (Czech Republic) FK Fotbal Třinec)
—	MF	SRB	Marko Milunović (from (Serbia) FK Teleoptik)
—	DF	SVK	Dušan Kucharčík (on loan from MŠK Žilina)
—	DF	SVK	Martin Kubena (on loan from MŠK Žilina)

Out: Note: Flags indicate national team as defined under FIFA eligibility rules; some limited exceptions apply. Players may hold more than one non-FIFA nationality.

No.	Pos.	Nation	Player
—	MF	SVK	Adam Morong (loan return to FK AS Trenčín)
—	FW	SVK	Tomáš Malec (loan return from FK AS Trenčín)
—	DF	SVK	Dušan Kucharčík (loan return to MŠK Žilina)
—	MF	SVK	René Revák (loan return to MŠK Žilina)
—	DF	SVK	Ján Mizerák (loan return to 1. FC Tatran Prešov)
—	FW	SVK	Peter Tomko (on loan to FC Družstevník Liptovská Štiavnica)
—	MF	SVK	Július Chomistek (to (Norway) FBK Voss)
—	FW	SVK	Július Gombala (loan return to ŽP Šport Podbrezová)

=== FC Spartak Trnava juniori ===
In: Note: Flags indicate national team as defined under FIFA eligibility rules; some limited exceptions apply. Players may hold more than one non-FIFA nationality.

No.	Pos.	Nation	Player
—	GK	SVK	Marek Solár (on loan from OŠK Dolný Ohaj)
—	DF	SVK	Juraj Galba (from PFK Piešťany)
—	DF	SVK	Marek Bočko (on loan from TJ OFC Gabčíkovo)
—	MF	SVK	Martin Kočiš (on loan from TJ Baník Ružiná)
—	FW	SVK	Adam Pavlík (on loan from ŠK Blava Jaslovské Bohunice)

Out: Note: Flags indicate national team as defined under FIFA eligibility rules; some limited exceptions apply. Players may hold more than one non-FIFA nationality.

No.	Pos.	Nation	Player
—	MF	SVK	Christián Steinhübel (to TBA)
—	MF	SVK	Tomáš Mikinič (on loan to (Czech Republic) FK Varnsdorf)

=== FK Pohronie ===
Note: Flags indicate national team as defined under FIFA eligibility rules; some limited exceptions apply. Players may hold more than one non-FIFA nationality.

No.	Pos.	Nation	Player
—	MF	SVK	Mário Ometák (on loan from FK REaMOS Kysucký Lieskovec)
—	FW	SVK	Vratislav Bobor (on loan from FK Slovan Levice)
—	MF	SVK	Peter Rybanský (on loan from PFK Piešťany)
—	MF	SVK	Matúš Matuškovič (on loan from FC Baník Horná Nitra)

Out: Note: Flags indicate national team as defined under FIFA eligibility rules; some limited exceptions apply. Players may hold more than one non-FIFA nationality.

No.	Pos.	Nation	Player
—	FW	SVK	Juraj Líška (loan return to MŠK Rimavská Sobota)

== See also ==
- 2013–14 Corgoň Liga
- 2013–14 2. liga
