= 2026–27 FC Nitra season =

Slovak football club season

FC Nitra
2026–27 season
- Owner: FC Nitra a. s.
- Chairman: Radoslav Bratko
- Head Coach: Andrej Štefanka
- Stadium: Štadión pod Zoborom, Nitra
- 3. Liga: 1st
- Slovak Cup: Third round
- Top goalscorer: League: Matúš Paukner (24); All: Matúš Paukner (26)
- Highest home attendance: 6,831 vs Slovan Bratislava (Slovak Cup, 16 September 2026)
- Lowest home attendance: 505 vs DAC Dunajská Streda B (3. Liga, 12 August 2026)
- Biggest win: 6–0 vs FK Rača (3. Liga, 10 October 2026)
- Biggest defeat: 1–3 vs Slovan Bratislava (Slovak Cup, 16 September 2026)
| Home colours | Away colours | Third colours |

The 2026–27 season is FC Nitra's first season in the third tier of Slovak football following promotion from the fourth tier. In addition to competing in the third tier, the club will also take part in the Slovak Cup. Ahead of the season, rival club AC Nitra merged with FC Nitra, with its players moving to FC Nitra. Several players who had come through the club's youth system also returned, including Miroslav Stoch.

During this season, the club set a record for the highest attendance at a single home match since the stadium was renovated in 2018, when 6,831 spectators attended the Slovak Cup third-round match against Slovan Bratislava on 16 September 2026.

== First-team squad ==
As of 25 September 2026

Note: Flags indicate national team as defined under FIFA eligibility rules; some limited exceptions apply. Players may hold more than one non-FIFA nationality.

| No. | Pos. | Nation | Player |
|---|---|---|---|
| 2 | DF | SVK | Adam Kopas |
| 3 | DF | SVK | Dominik Straňák |
| 4 | DF | GHA | Kojo Amankwaa |
| 6 | MF | SVK | Adam Šútor |
| 7 | MF | SVK | Róbert Pich |
| 8 | DF | SVK | Lukáš Štetina (captain) |
| 9 | MF | SVK | Miroslav Stoch |
| 10 | FW | SVK | Matúš Paukner (vice-captain) |
| 11 | FW | SVK | Tomáš Hambálek |
| 16 | DF | SVK | Denis Pánsky |
| 18 | MF | SVK | Michal Klec |

| No. | Pos. | Nation | Player |
|---|---|---|---|
| 19 | MF | SVK | Karol Mondek |
| 21 | MF | SVK | Alex Bucheň |
| 22 | DF | SVK | Andrej Kadlec |
| 23 | FW | NGR | Abdullahi Aliyu Adam |
| 25 | MF | SVK | Lukáš Štrauch |
| 31 | GK | SVK | Gregor Tóth |
| 34 | DF | SVK | Lukáš Greššák |
| 45 | FW | SVK | Filip Balaj |
| 91 | GK | SVK | Pavol Bajza |
| 97 | DF | SVK | Patrik Šurnovský |
| — | MF | SVK | Ondrej Vrábel |

== Coaching staff ==
As of pre-season

| Staff | Job title |
|---|---|
| (Slovakia) Andrej Štefanka | Manager |
| (Slovakia) Marek Tomiš | Assistant manager |
| (Slovakia) Miroslav Reischl | Assistant manager |
| (Slovakia) Štefan Senecký | Goalkeeping coach |
| (Slovakia) Viliam Mečár | Team Doctor |
| (Slovakia) Peter Januška | Physiotherapist |
| (Slovakia) Ján Andraško | Physiotherapist |

== Transfers and contracts ==
=== Released / out of contract ===
| Date from | Pos. | Nationality | Player | Subsequent club | Joined date | Ref. |
|---|---|---|---|---|---|---|
| 30 june 2026 | FW | (Slovakia) | Patrik Kuruc | MŠK Novohrad Lučenec | 20 july 2026 | |
| 1 july 2026 | FW | (Slovakia) | Jozef Sombat | | | |
| 1 july 2026 | GK | (Slovakia) | Ľubomír Krátky | | | |
| 1 july 2026 | FW | (Slovakia) | Martin Košťál | | | |
| 1 july 2026 | FW | (Nigeria) | John Bakari Danga | | | |

=== In ===
| Date from | Pos. | Nationality | Player | From | Fee | Ref. |
|---|---|---|---|---|---|---|
| 24 June 2026 | FW | (Slovakia) | Matúš Paukner | (Slovakia) AC Nitra | Free | |
| 24 June 2026 | FW | (Slovakia) | Tomáš Hambálek | (Slovakia) AC Nitra | Free | |
| 6 July 2026 | DF | (Slovakia) | Patrik Šurnovský | (Austria) SV Horn | Free | |
| 7 July 2026 | MF | (Slovakia) | Adam Šútor | (Slovakia) FC ViOn Zlaté Moravce – Vráble | Free | |
| 7 July 2026 | GK | (Slovakia) | Pavol Bajza | (Slovakia) FC Tatran Prešov | Free | |
| 8 July 2026 | FW | (Slovakia) | Filip Balaj | (Slovakia) FC ViOn Zlaté Moravce – Vráble | Free | |
| 8 July 2026 | GK | (Slovakia) | Gregor Tóth | (Slovakia) FC ViOn Zlaté Moravce – Vráble | Free | |
| 9 July 2026 | MF | (Slovakia) | Miroslav Stoch | (Czech Republic) FK Lety | Free | |
| 9 July 2026 | MF | (Slovakia) | Karol Mondek | (Slovakia) FC ViOn Zlaté Moravce – Vráble | Free | |
| 20 July 2026 | MF | (Slovakia) | Alex Bucheň | (Slovakia) Jupie Banská Bystrica | Free | |
| 14 August 2026 | FW | (North Macedonia) | Besmir Daci | (North Macedonia) FK Skopje | Free | |
| 1 September 2026 | DF | (Slovakia) | Adam Kopas | (Greece) PGS Kissamikos | Free | |

=== Out ===
| Date from | Pos. | Nationality | Player | To | Fee | Ref. |
|---|---|---|---|---|---|---|
| 11 May 2026 | MF | (Brazil) | Andre Lopes Siqueira | (Brazil) Liga Acesita - MG | Free | |
| 1 July 2026 | MF | (Slovakia) | Frederik Domasta | (Slovakia) TJ Družstevník Veľké Ludince | Free | |
| 1 July 2026 | FW | (Slovakia) | Ľubomír Šoky | (Slovakia) TJ Družstevník Veľké Ludince | Free | |
| 2 July 2026 | FW | (Slovakia) | Boris Bruckner | (Slovakia) ŠK Kmeťovo | Free | |
| 2 July 2026 | FW | (Slovakia) | Adam Homola | (Slovakia) FC ViOn Zlaté Moravce | Free | |
| 7 July 2026 | DF | (Slovakia) | Pavol Grác | (Slovakia) MFK Nová Baňa | Free | |
| 7 July 2026 | MF | (Slovakia) | Mário Baláž | (Slovakia) FKM Nové Zámky | Free | |
| 8 July 2026 | FW | (Slovakia) | Daniel Rapavý | (Austria) ASK Loosdorf | Free | |
| 16 July 2026 | GK | (Slovakia) | Tomáš Krištof | (Slovakia) ŠK Tvrdošovce | Free | |
| 16 July 2026 | FW | (Slovakia) | Adrián Mokoš | (Slovakia) FKM Nové Zámky | Free | |
| 20 July 2026 | GK | (Slovakia) | René Žákech | (Slovakia) FK Rača | Free | |
| 22 July 2026 | MF | (Slovakia) | Marek Michalička | (Slovakia) OK Častkovce | Free | |
| 10 September 2026 | FW | (North Macedonia) | Besmir Daci | (Kosovo) FC Sharri | Free | |

=== Loans in ===
| Date from | Pos. | Nationality | Player | From | Until | Ref. |
|---|---|---|---|---|---|---|
| 25 September 2026 | FW | (Slovakia) | Nicolas Gučik | (Slovakia) MŠK Žilina | 30 June 2027 | |

=== Loans out ===
| Date from | Pos. | Nationality | Player | To | Until | Ref. |
|---|---|---|---|---|---|---|
| 23 July 2026 | MF | (Colombia) | Samuel Perez Aponte | (Slovakia) TJ Štart Nitrianske Hrnčiarovce | 30 June 2027 | |
| 23 July 2025 | GK | (Slovakia) | Tomáš Krištof | (Slovakia) FK Slovan Duslo Šaľa | 30 June 2026 | |
| 7 August 2026 | MF | (Slovakia) | Marko Bača | (Slovakia) FK Slovan Levice | 30 June 2027 | |
| 13 August 2026 | FW | (The Gambia) | Mamadou Gingally | (Latvia) FK Ventspils | 30 November 2026 | |
| 21 August 2026 | MF | (Slovakia) | Maximilian Kubička | (Slovakia) FC Pata | 30 June 2027 | |
| 7 September 2026 | MF | (Slovakia) | Marek Výbošťok | (Slovakia) OFK Dunajská Lužná | 30 June 2027 | |

== Friendlies ==
Win Draw Loss

=== Pre-season ===
| 11 July 2026 Friendly | MFK Zvolen | 1–3 | FC Nitra | Priechod |
| 10:30 CEST | | Report | Paukner 43'; Pánsky 85'; Výbošťok 90' | Stadium: Priechod Stadium |

| 17 July 2026 Friendly | FC Nitra | 7–1 | TJ Imeľ | Dolné Krškany |
| 18:00 CEST | Šútor (x); Hambálek (x); Balaj (x); Klec (x) | Report | | Stadium: Dolné Krškany Stadium |

| 24 July 2026 Friendly | FC Nitra | 2–1 | FK Podkonice | Nitra |
| 17:00 CEST | Paukner 27'; Hambálek 46' | Report | | Stadium: Štadión pod Zoborom; Attendance: 300 |

| 31 July 2026 Friendly | FC Nitra | 3–0 | AS Trenčín B | Nitra |
| 18:00 CEST | Paukner 28'; Štetina 51'; Mondek 56' | Report | | Stadium: Štadión pod Zoborom |

== Competitions ==
=== 3. liga ===
==== League table (Western Group) ====
| Pos | Team | Pld | W | D | L | GF | GA | GD | Pts | Promotion or relegation |
|---|---|---|---|---|---|---|---|---|---|---|
| 1 | FC Nitra | 14 | 13 | 1 | 0 | 51 | 10 | +41 | 40 | Promotion to 2. Liga |
| 2 | Púchov | 15 | 8 | 5 | 2 | 36 | 10 | +26 | 29 | |
| 3 | Dunajská Lužná | 15 | 8 | 4 | 3 | 19 | 11 | +8 | 28 | |
| 4 | Beluša | 15 | 6 | 6 | 3 | 32 | 24 | +8 | 24 | |
| 5 | DAC Dunajská Streda B | 15 | 7 | 3 | 5 | 29 | 21 | +8 | 24 | |

Source: sportnet.sme.sk
Rules for classification: 1) Points; 2) Head-to-head points; 3) Head-to-head goal difference; 4) Head-to-head away goals scored; 5) Play-off.

==== Matches ====
Win Draw Loss Fixtures

| 8 August 2026 1 | MŠK Púchov | 0–0 | FC Nitra | Púchov |
| 17:00 CEST | Tandara (yellow card) 56'; Boris (yellow card) 83'; Kopičár (red card) 90+2' | Report | Kadlec (yellow card) 46'; Hambálek (yellow card) 90+2' (yellow-red card) 90+2' | Stadium: Mestský štadión Púchov; Attendance: 765; Referee: Daniel Kukan |

| 15 August 2026 2 | FC Nitra | 3–2 | OK Častkovce | Nitra |
| 19:00 CEST | Adam 9', (yellow card) 79'; Balaj 32', 54' | Report | Adeyemi 21'; Žákech (yellow card) 79'; Pol 81' | Stadium: Štadión pod Zoborom; Attendance: 943; Referee: Jozef Kováč |

| 23 August 2026 3 | Spartak Myjava | 1-5 | FC Nitra | Myjava |
| 16:00 CEST | Voitiuk 90' | Report | Balaj 16'; Šurnovský 35'; Adam 42'; Štetina 59'; Bucheň 90+1' | Stadium: Stadium Myjava; Attendance: 551; Referee: Maroš Libiak |

| 29 August 2026 4 | FC Nitra | 2-0 | Baník Prievidza | Nitra |
| 17:00 CEST | Adam 11'; Štetina (yellow card) 25'; Paukner 36'; Pánsky (yellow card) 45'; Kadlec (yellow card) 60' | Report | Štrbák (yellow card) 36'; Mašlanka (yellow card) 36' | Stadium: Štadión pod Zoborom; Attendance: 1,030; Referee: Dominik Husár |

| 6 September 2026 5 | Veľké Ludince | 0-5 | FC Nitra | Veľké Ludince |
| 16:00 CEST | | Report | Paukner 4'; Adam (yellow card) 12'; Šútor 20'; Kadlec 53'; Mondek (yellow card) 61'; Klec 83'; Hambálek 88' (yellow card) 90' | Stadium: Štadión Veľké Ludince; Attendance: 300; Referee: Marko Polák |

| 12 September 2026 6 | FC Nitra | 2-1 | DAC Dunajská Streda B | Nitra |
| 17:00 CEST | Straňák 61' (yellow card) 69'; Paukner (penalty missed) 73 90+4' (pen.) | Report | Fehér 13'; Doan Anh (yellow card) 37'; Živanovič (yellow card) 90+3'; Brnula (yellow card) 90+3' | Stadium: Štadión pod Zoborom; Attendance: 505; Referee: Denis Janček |

| 19 September 2026 7 | FKM Nové Zámky | 1-5 | FC Nitra | Nové Zámky |
| 15:30 CEST | Horodník (yellow card) 37'; Baláž 90' | Report | Paukner 30', 43'; Pánsky (yellow card) 31'; Kopas (yellow card) 41'; Mondek 49'; Klec 55'; Balaj 82' | Stadium: Ladislav Ganczner Stadium; Attendance: 868; Referee: Andrej Chromý |

| 26 September 2026 8 | FC Nitra | 4-0 | Slovan Duslo Šaľa | Nitra |
| 17:00 CEST | Paukner 25' (pen.); Adam 27', 36'; Greššák (yellow card) 49'; Pánsky 88' | Report | Madubuegwu (yellow card) 23'; Krivošík (yellow card) 56'; Camara (yellow card) 71'; Orság (yellow card) 86'; Matušica (yellow card) 89' | Stadium: Štadión pod Zoborom; Attendance: 843; Referee: Oleksandr Sidenko |

| 4 October 2026 9 | AS Trenčín B | 2-4 | FC Nitra | Trenčín |
| 10:30 CEST | Slovák 13'; Kasana 38'; Galajda (yellow card) 48'; Ansah (yellow card) 54' | Report | Paukner 11', 72', 88' (yellow card) 18'; Slavíček 51' (o.g.); Štetina (yellow card) 58'; Mondek (yellow card) 63' | Stadium: Štadión Sihoť; Attendance: 200; Referee: Peter Pati Nagy |

| 10 October 2026 10 | FC Nitra | 6-0 | FK Rača | Nitra |
| 17:00 CEST | Štetina 10'; Mondek 24', 57'; Paukner 27', 42'; Balaj 50' | Report | Delinčák (yellow card) 23' | Stadium: Štadión pod Zoborom; Attendance: 518; Referee: Dominik Husár |

| 18 October 2026 11 | FK Beluša | 2-4 | FC Nitra | Beluša |
| 14:30 CEST | Gašpar 16'; Šebeň (yellow card) 54'; Krčula 67' | Report | Balaj 6', 73'; Kopas 56'; Paukner 71' | Stadium: Stadium TJ KOVO Beluša; Attendance: 300; Referee: Andrej Chromý |

| 24 October 2026 12 | FC Nitra | 5-1 | KFC Komárno B | Nitra |
| 16:30 CEST | Paukner 1', 22', 59', 73'; Kopas 10' (yellow card) 29' | Report | Mišovič 57'; Lacza (yellow card) 86' | Stadium: Štadión pod Zoborom; Attendance: 580; Referee: Dávid Kačmár |

| 7 November 2026 14 | FC Nitra | 1-0 | OFK Dunajská Lužná | Nitra |
| 17:00 CET | Štetina (yellow card) 31'; Paukner 70' | Report | Čech (yellow card) 28' | Stadium: Štadión pod Zoborom; Attendance: 676; Referee: Daniel Kukan |

| 13 November 2026 15 | MŠK Senec | 0-5 | FC Nitra | Senec |
| 18:30 CET | Argyusi (yellow card) 51' | Report | Paukner 17' (pen.), 30', 61', 69'; Pánsky (yellow card) 37'; Straňák (yellow card) 67'; Amankwaa (yellow card) 81' | Stadium: NTC Senec; Attendance: 150; Referee: Denis Janček |

| 21 November 2026 13 | ŠK 1923 Gabčíkovo | 2-4 | FC Nitra | Gabčíkovo |
| 13:00 CET | Zsigmond 2'; Lénárth (yellow card) 16' (goal) 61' | Report | Paukner 4', 11', 76'; Hambálek 50' (yellow card) 60'; Šurnovský (yellow card) 67' | Stadium: Stadium Gabčíkovo; Attendance: 566; Referee: Marko Polák |
Note: The match was originally scheduled for 31 October 2026 but was postponed until 21 November 2026.

| 6 March 2027 16 | FC Nitra | v | MŠK Púchov | Nitra |
| 17:00 CET | | | | Stadium: Štadión pod Zoborom |

| 13 march 2027 17 | OK Častkovce | v | FC Nitra | Častkovce |
| 14:30 CET | | | | Stadium: Stadium OK Častkovce |

| 20 march 2027 18 | FC Nitra | v | Spartak Myjava | Nitra |
| 17:00 CET | | | | Stadium: Štadión pod Zoborom |

| 27 March 2027 19 | Baník Prievidza | v | FC Nitra | Prievidza |
| 12:30 CEST | | | | Stadium: Futbalový štadión Prievidza |

| 3 April 2027 20 | FC Nitra | v | Veľké Ludince | Nitra |
| 17:00 CEST | | | | Stadium: Štadión pod Zoborom |

| 11 April 2027 21 | DAC Dunajská Streda B | v | FC Nitra | Dunajská Streda |
| 10:30 CEST | | | | Stadium: MOL Aréna |

| 17 April 2027 22 | FC Nitra | v | FKM Nové Zámky | Nitra |
| 17:00 CEST | | | | Stadium: Štadión pod Zoborom |

| 24 April 2027 23 | Slovan Duslo Šaľa | v | FC Nitra | Šaľa |
| 16:30 CEST | | | | Stadium: Šaľa Stadium |

| 1 May 2027 24 | FC Nitra | v | AS Trenčín B | Nitra |
| 17:00 CEST | | | | Stadium: Štadión pod Zoborom |

| 9 May 2027 25 | FK Rača | v | FC Nitra | Rača, Bratislava |
| 10:30 CEST | | | | Stadium: Štadión Rača |

| 15 May 2027 26 | FC Nitra | v | FK Beluša | Nitra |
| 17:00 CEST | | | | Stadium: Štadión pod Zoborom |

| 20 May 2027 27 | KFC Komárno B | v | FC Nitra | Komárno |
| 17:00 CEST | | | | Stadium: Mestský štadión Komárno |

| 22 May 2027 28 | FC Nitra | v | ŠK 1923 Gabčíkovo | Nitra |
| 17:00 CEST | | | | Stadium: Štadión pod Zoborom |

| 29 May 2027 29 | OFK Dunajská Lužná | v | FC Nitra | Dunajská Lužná |
| 17:00 CEST | | | | Stadium: NTC Dunajská Lužná |

| 5 june 2027 30 | FC Nitra | v | MŠK Senec | Nitra |
| 17:00 CEST | | | | Stadium: Štadión pod Zoborom |

=== Slovak Cup ===
Win Loss Fixtures

| 1 August 2026 1R | OFK Kolíňany | 2–3 | FC Nitra | Kolíňany |
| | Domiciano (yellow card) 52' *Király 80' (pen.), 90' | Report | Paukner 42' (pen.) *Plešivka 73' *Adam 76' | Stadium: Stadium Kolíňany; Attendance: 452; Referee: Jakub Hybský |

| 19 August 2026 2R | Dolné Krškany | 0-2 | FC Nitra | Dolné Krškany |
| | Galko (yellow card) 64' | Report | Paukner (pen.), 9' *Výbošťok (yellow card) 57' *Bucheň 68' | Stadium: Dolné Krškany Stadium; Attendance: 700; Referee: Martin Slatárovič |

| 16 September 2026 3R | FC Nitra | 1-3 | Slovan Bratislava | Nitra |
| | Hambálek 8' *Adam (yellow card) 55' *Šurnovský (yellow card) 58' *Paukner (yellow card) 66' | Report | Barseghyan 39' *Čerepkai 86' *Wimmer (yellow card) 90+3' *Matsuoka 90+4' | Stadium: Štadión pod Zoborom; Attendance: 6,831; Referee: Igor Valent |
