= 2013–14 ŠK Slovan Bratislava season =

ŠK Slovan Bratislava
2013–2014 season
- Stadium: Štadión Pasienky
- Corgoň Liga: 1st
- Slovnaft Cup: Runners-up
- UEFA Champions League: Second Qualifying Round
- Highest home attendance: 4,133 vs. MFK Ružomberok (18 August 2013)
- Lowest home attendance: 0 on two occasions (Closed grounds)
- Average home league attendance: 1,878
Home colours	Away colours

The 2013–14 season is ŠK Slovan Bratislava's 94th season in its existence and 8th consecutive season in Corgoň liga, top flight of Slovak football.

== Competitions ==
=== Overview ===
Competition	Started round	Current position / round	Final position / round	First match	Last match
Corgoň Liga	—	—	1st	12 July 2013	
Slovnaft Cup	Round of 32	Semifinals		28 August 2013	
UEFA Champions League	Second qualifying round	—	Second qualifying round	17 July 2013	24 July 2013

Updated to match played 18 Sep 2013
Source: Competitions

=== Corgoň Liga ===
==== League table ====
Pos	Team	Pld	W	D	L	GF	GA	GD	Pts	Qualification or relegation
1	Slovan Bratislava (C)	33	24	3	6	63	32	+31	75	Qualification for Champions League second qualifying round
2	Trenčín	33	19	6	8	74	35	+39	63	Qualification for Europa League second qualifying round
3	Spartak Trnava	33	16	5	12	47	42	+5	53	Qualification for Europa League first qualifying round
4	Ružomberok	33	15	5	13	56	51	+5	50	
5	Košice	33	13	7	13	41	40	+1	46	Qualification for Europa League second qualifying round (Note: 2013–14 Slovak Cup winners Košice qualified for the second qualifying round of the 2014–15 UEFA Europa League.)

Source: Niké liga (in Slovak)
Rules for classification: 1) points; 2) goal difference; 3) number of goals scored.
(C) Champions

==== Results summary ====
Overall								Home						Away					
Pld	W	D	L	GF	GA	GD	Pts	W	D	L	GF	GA	GD	W	D	L	GF	GA	GD
33	24	3	6	63	32	+31	75	12	2	3	33	13	+20	12	1	3	30	19	+11

Last updated: 31 May 2014.

==== Results by round ====
Round	1	2	3	4	5	6	7	8	9	10	11	12	13	14	15	16	17	18	19	20	21	22	23	24	25	26	27	28	29	30	31	32	33
Ground	H	H	A	H	A	H	A	H	A	H	A	A	A	H	A	H	A	H	A	H	A	H	H	H	A	H	A	H	A	H	A	H	A
Result	D	W	L	W	W	W	L	W	W	W	W	W	W	L	D	D	W	W	W	W	W	W	W	W	W	L	W	L	L	W	W	W	W
Position	7	9 (Note: Due to the postponement of round 2 match ŠK Slovan and FK Senica had one match less than the other teams in the league table.)	9	8	6	2	2	2	1	1	1	1	1	1	1	1	1	1	1	1	1	1	1	1	1	1	1	1	1	1	1	1	1

Source: Matches
A = Away; H = Home; W = Win; D = Draw; L = Loss

=== Matches ===
Kickoff times are in CET.

12 July 2013 1	ŠK Slovan Bratislava	1–1	DAC Dunajská Streda	Bratislava
19:30	Pavel Fořt 50'		Branislav Fodrek 41'	Stadium: Štadión Pasienky; Attendance: 3,014; Referee: Štefan Leško

28 July 2013 3	AS Trenčín	4–2	ŠK Slovan Bratislava	Trenčín
18:00	Karol Mondek 62'; Tomáš Malec 76', 86', 89'		Juraj Halenár 49'; Karol Mészáros 64'	Stadium: Štadión na Sihoti; Attendance: 4,270; Referee: Patrik Hrčka

4 August 2013 4	ŠK Slovan Bratislava	4–2	Spartak Myjava	Bratislava
19:30	Karol Mészáros 29'; Seydouba Soumah 45'; Pavel Fořt 50'; Mamadou Bagayoko 54'; Lester Peltier 60'			Stadium: Štadión Pasienky; Attendance: 3,711; Referee: Ján Valášek

11 August 2013 5	MFK Košice	0–1	ŠK Slovan Bratislava	Košice
17:30			Branislav Niňaj 58'	Stadium: Štadión Lokomotívy v Čermeli; Attendance: 6,852; Referee: Ľubomír Samotný

18 August 2013 6	ŠK Slovan Bratislava	3–2	MFK Ružomberok	Bratislava
19:00	Pavel Fořt 14'; Igor Žofčák 41'; Juraj Halenár 49'		Tomáš Ďubek 63'; Léandre Tawamba 79'	Stadium: Štadión Pasienky; Attendance: 4,133; Referee: Miroslav Jaška

21 August 2013 2	ŠK Slovan Bratislava	1–0	FK Senica	Bratislava
19:00	Pavel Fořt 45'			Stadium: Štadión Pasienky; Attendance: 0 (Note: Slovan Bratislava played two games in front of an empty stadium because of a bomb attack on MFK Ružomberok fans during round 6 game.)

24 August 2013 7	MŠK Žilina	2–0	ŠK Slovan Bratislava	Žilina
17:30	Róbert Pich 15', 59'			Stadium: Štadión Pod Dubňom; Attendance: 3,752; Referee: Vnuk

1 September 2013 8	ŠK Slovan Bratislava	2–0	FC ViOn Zlaté Moravce	Bratislava
19:30	Marko Milinković 32'; Pavel Fořt 41'			Stadium: Štadión Pasienky; Attendance: 0 Referee: Leško

14 September 2013 9	FK Dukla Banská Bystrica	2–4	ŠK Slovan Bratislava	Banská Bystrica
17:30	Fabián Slančík 2'; Pavol Jurčo 45'		Jiří Kladrubský 14'; Róbert Vittek 44'; Juraj Halenár 51'; Dionatan Teixeira 70' (o.g.)	Stadium: SNP Stadium; Attendance: 3,390; Referee: Kráľovič

18 September 2013 10	ŠK Slovan Bratislava	5–0	FC Nitra	Bratislava
18:00	Pavel Fořt 2', 51'; Róbert Vittek 15', 40'; Mamadou Bagayoko 28'			Stadium: Štadión Pasienky; Attendance: 855; Referee: Chmura

21 September 2013 11	Spartak Trnava	1–3	ŠK Slovan Bratislava	Trnava
16:00	Roman Procházka 8'		Pavel Fořt 17'; Róbert Vittek 25'; Jiří Kladrubský 74'	Stadium: Štadión Antona Malatinského; Attendance: 3,250; Referee: Valášek

29 September 2013 12	DAC Dunajská Streda	1–2	ŠK Slovan Bratislava	Dunajská Streda
14:30	Michal Gašparík 63' (pen.)		Marko Milinković 45'; Pavel Fořt 52'	Stadium: Štadión DAC; Attendance: 1,702; Referee: Samotný

4 October 2013 13	FK Senica	0–2	ŠK Slovan Bratislava	Senica
17:30			Marko Milinković 45'; Pavel Fořt 64'	Stadium: Štadión FK Senica; Attendance: 1,983; Referee: Sedlák

18 October 2013 14	ŠK Slovan Bratislava	0–3	AS Trenčín	Bratislava
18:30			Peter Kleščík 53' (pen.); Gino van Kessel 65'; Jakub Holúbek 89'	Stadium: Štadión Pasienky; Attendance: 2,314; Referee: Kráľovič

26 October 2013 15	Spartak Myjava	2–2	ŠK Slovan Bratislava	Myjava
18:00	Urgela 6'; Šulek 11'; Marček (yellow card) 37'	Summary	Milinković 28'; Mészáros (yellow card) 38'; Gorosito (yellow card) 60'; Hlohovský 87'	Stadium: Stadium Myjava; Attendance: 2,700; Referee: Patrik Hrcka

3 November 2013 16	ŠK Slovan Bratislava	1–1	MFK Košice	Bratislava
16:00	Branislav Niňaj 31'		Nermin Haskič 51'	Stadium: Štadión Pasienky; Attendance: 998

10 November 2013 17	MFK Ružomberok	2–3	ŠK Slovan Bratislava	Ružomberok
14:30	Miloš Lačný 54'; Tomáš Ďubek 84' (pen.)	Summary	Róbert Vittek 20', 69'; Igor Žofčák 36'	Stadium: Štadión MFK Ružomberok; Attendance: 4,675; Referee: Mario Vik

24 November 2013 18	ŠK Slovan Bratislava	2–1	MŠK Žilina	Bratislava
17:00	Róbert Vittek 30'; Igor Žofčák 46'		Jakub Paur 45'	Stadium: Štadión Pasienky; Attendance: 863; Referee: Kráľovič

30 November 2013 19	FC ViOn Zlaté Moravce	0–2	ŠK Slovan Bratislava	Zlaté Moravce
14:30			Branislav Niňaj 48'; Juraj Halenár 88'	Stadium: Štadión FC ViOn; Attendance: 1,610; Referee: Weiss

1 March 2014 20	ŠK Slovan Bratislava	2–0	FK Dukla Banská Bystrica	Bratislava
15:00	Soumah 10'; Kolčák (yellow card) 43'; Žofčák 59'	Summary	Podstavek (yellow card) 69'	Stadium: Štadión Pasienky; Attendance: 1,918; Referee: (Slovakia) Pavol Chmura

10 March 2014 21	FC Nitra	1–2	ŠK Slovan Bratislava	Nitra
18:30	Boszorád (yellow card) 21'; Mikuš 55'	Summary	Niňaj 8' (yellow card) 35'; Kladrubský (yellow card) 69'; Žofčák 80'; Grosito (yellow card) 82'; Perniš (yellow card) 87'	Stadium: Štadión pod Zoborom; Attendance: 2,150; Referee: (Slovakia) Miroslav Jaška

=== Slovnaft Cup ===
Round of 32

28 August 2013 Round of 32	AFC Nové Mesto nad Váhom (3)	0–5	ŠK Slovan Bratislava	Nové Mesto nad Váhom
17:00			Igor Žofčák 37'; Pavel Fořt 49', 57'; Karol Mészáros 66'; Filip Hlohovský 88'	Stadium: Areál AFC Považan; Attendance: 540; Referee: Róbert Mojsej

Round of 16

25 September 2013 Round of 16	OFK Dunajská Lužná (3)	0–3	ŠK Slovan Bratislava	Dunajská Lužná
16:00			Filip Hlohovský 5'; Pavel Fořt 82'; Róbert Vittek 83'	Stadium: Stadium Dunajská Lužná; Attendance: 950; Referee: Jozef Pavlík

Quarterfinals

22 October 2013 Quarterfinals; Leg 1	MŠK Žilina	1–3	ŠK Slovan Bratislava	Žilina
17:30	Tomáš Majtán 88'		Kristián Kolčák 10'; Karol Mészáros 32'; Lester Peltier 38'	Stadium: Štadión Pod Dubňom; Attendance: 2,369; Referee: Martin Ježík

6 November 2013 Quarterfinals; Leg 2	ŠK Slovan Bratislava	2–0	MŠK Žilina	Bratislava
	Erik Grendel 86'; Róbert Vittek 90'			Stadium: Štadión Pasienky; Attendance: 420; Referee: Dušan Sedlák

ŠK Slovan Bratislava won 5–1 on aggregate.

Semifinals

8 April 2014 Semifinals; Leg 1	FK Senica	1–3	ŠK Slovan Bratislava	Senica
16:30	Piroska 30' (pen.) (yellow card) 53'; Opiela (yellow card) 54'	Summary	Vittek 14' (yellow card) 60'; Peltier 17'; Milinković (yellow card) 42'; Soumah 69'; Gorosito (yellow card) 81'	Stadium: Štadión FK Senica; Attendance: 1,324; Referee: (Slovakia) Vladimir Vnuk

15 April 2014 Semifinals; Leg 2	ŠK Slovan Bratislava	3–0 (6–1 agg.)	FK Senica	Bratislava
13:00	Halenár 4'; Vrablec (yellow card) 26'; Gorosito 44'; Milinković (yellow card) 58' (goal) 75'; Bagi (yellow card) 61'	Summary	Cristovam (yellow card) 21'; Opiela (yellow card) 71'	Attendance: 3,565; Referee: (Slovakia) Lubomir Samotný

1 May 2014 Final	ŠK Slovan Bratislava	1–2	MFK Košice	Myjava
18:20	Vittek 6'; Milinković (yellow card) 50'	Summary	Diaby 31'; Bukata 74'; Korijkov (yellow card) 80'; Šinglár (yellow card) 90'	Stadium: Stadium Myjava; Attendance: 2,647; Referee: (Slovakia) Miroslav Jaška

=== UEFA Champions League ===
==== Second qualifying round ====
17 July 2013 First leg	Slovan Bratislava (Slovakia)	2–1	(Bulgaria) Ludogorets Razgrad	Štadión Pasienky, Bratislava
20:15	Halenár 87', 90+3' (pen.)		Mäntylä 65'	Attendance: 8,126; Referee: Anthony Taylor (England)

24 July 2013 Second leg	Ludogorets Razgrad (Bulgaria)	3–0 (4–2 agg.)	(Slovakia) Slovan Bratislava	Ludogorets Arena, Razgrad
19:30	Stoyanov 3'; Dani Abalo 12', 78'			Attendance: 3,890; Referee: Mauro Bergonzi (Italy)

=== Friendly matches ===
9 June 2013	FC Zbrojovka Brno (Czech Republic)	3–1	ŠK Slovan Bratislava	Brno
20:00

15 June 2013	TJ Veľké Leváre (5)	2–8	ŠK Slovan Bratislava	Veľké Leváre
17:00

22 June 2013	Nový Život Veľké Uherce (6)	1–11	ŠK Slovan Bratislava	Veľké Uherce
17:00

27 June 2013	FC Hradec Králové (Czech Republic) (2)	2–1	ŠK Slovan Bratislava	Hradec Králové
18:00				Stadium: Všesportovní stadion

28 June 2013	SK Sigma Olomouc (Czech Republic)	0–1	ŠK Slovan Bratislava	Moravská Třebová
				Attendance: 800

2 July 2013	ŠK Slovan Bratislava	2–1	ŽP Šport Podbrezová (2)	Bratislava
				Stadium: Štadión Pasienky

5 July 2013	ŠK Slovan Bratislava	2–0	ŠK SFM Senec (2)	Bratislava
				Stadium: Štadión Pasienky

5 September 2013	AC Sparta Praha (Czech Republic)	1–0	ŠK Slovan Bratislava	Prague
20:15				Stadium: Generali Arena; Attendance: 2,363

10 October 2013	SKN St. Pölten (Austria) (2)	–	ŠK Slovan Bratislava	St. Pölten
17:00		[]		Stadium: NV Arena

== Players ==
=== Squad, appearances and goals ===
No.	Nat	Player	Total						League					Europe					Cup				
No.	Nat	Player	Starts	Apps	Goals	Min	Yellow card	Red card	Apps	Goals	Min	Yellow card	Red card	Apps	Goals	Min	Yellow card	Red card	Apps	Goals	Min	Yellow card	Red card
Goalkeepers
22	(Slovakia)	Martin Poláček	3	3	0	270	0	0	1	0	90	0	0	0	0	0	0	0	2	0	180	0	0
30	(Slovakia)	Matúš Putnocký	13	13	0	1170	1	0	11	0	990	1	0	2	0	180	0	0	0	0	0	0	0
Defenders
2	(Serbia)	Miloš Josimov	6	6	0	516	0	0	4	0	336	0	0	2	0	180	0	0	0	0	0	0	0
3	(Slovakia)	Branislav Niňaj	11	12	1	1003	0	0	10	1	823	0	0	0	0	0	0	0	2	0	180	0	0
4	(Slovakia)	Erik Čikoš	8	9	0	655	0	0	7	0	506	0	0	0	0	0	0	0	2	0	149	0	0
5	(Slovakia)	Dávid Hudák	2	3	0	181	0	0	3	0	181	0	0	0	0	0	0	0	0	0	0	0	0
16	(Argentina)	Nicolas Ezequiel Gorosito	11	12	0	1048	1	0	9	0	778	1	0	2	0	180	0	0	1	0	90	0	0
18	(Ivory Coast)	Mamadou Bagayoko	13	13	2	1170	3	0	11	2	990	3	0	2	0	180	0	0	0	0	0	0	0
21	(Slovakia)	Kristián Kolčák	6	6	0	540	1	0	2	0	180	0	0	2	0	180	1	0	2	0	180	0	0
28	(Slovakia)	Martin Vrablec	4	6	0	436	1	0	4	0	315	1	0	0	0	0	0	0	2	0	121	0	0
Midfielders
7	(Slovakia)	Filip Hlohovský	4	9	2	434	0	0	6	0	204	0	0	1	0	68	0	0	2	2	162	0	0
8	(Slovakia)	Erik Grendel	8	13	0	771	4	1	10	0	556	1	0	1	0	80	2	1	2	0	135	1	0
10	(Slovakia)	Igor Žofčák	16	16	2	1251	2	0	12	1	975	2	0	2	0	96	0	0	2	1	180	0	0
11	(Serbia)	Marko Milinković	8	9	2	677	2	0	6	2	452	2	0	2	0	180	0	0	1	0	45	0	0
13	(Argentina)	Facundo Serra	1	1	0	45	0	0	0	0	0	0	0	0	0	0	0	0	1	0	45	0	0
17	(Czech Republic)	Jiří Kladrubský	14	14	2	1189	2	0	12	2	1009	2	0	2	0	180	0	0	0	0	0	0	0
20	(Guinea)	Seydouba Soumah	7	11	1	555	1	1	10	1	541	1	1	1	0	14	0	0	0	0	0	0	0
29	(Slovakia)	Matej Jakúbek	3	6	0	315	1	0	3	0	59	0	0	1	0	76	0	0	2	0	180	1	0
Forwards
6	(Czech Republic)	Pavel Fořt	12	15	12	980	1	0	11	9	823	1	0	2	0	94	0	0	2	3	63	0	0
9	(Slovakia)	Juraj Halenár	10	13	5	637	2	0	12	3	896	2	0	1	2	15	0	0	0	0	0	0	0
12	(Slovakia)	Karol Mészáros	7	13	3	737	2	0	10	2	512	1	0	1	0	90	0	0	2	1	135	1	0
23	(Trinidad and Tobago)	Lester Peltier	3	13	1	444	1	0	9	1	244	1	0	2	0	93	0	0	2	0	107	0	0
24	(Slovakia)	Lukáš Hutta	0	0	0	0	0	0	0	0	0	0	0	0	0	0	0	0	0	0	0	0	0
26	(Slovakia)	Marek Kuzma	2	9	1	286	0	0	7	1	184	0	0	0	0	0	0	0	2	0	102	0	0
33	(Slovakia)	Róbert Vittek	4	5	5	373	0	0	4	4	345	0	0	0	0	0	0	0	1	1	28	0	0
Updated: 30 Sep 2013

=== Transfers ===
Source: Wikipedia

In: Note: Flags indicate national team as defined under FIFA eligibility rules; some limited exceptions apply. Players may hold more than one non-FIFA nationality.

No.	Pos.	Nation	Player
—	DF	SRB	Miloš Josimov (from (Serbia) FK Donji Srem)
—	FW	SVK	Karol Mészáros (loan return from FC ViOn Zlaté Moravce)
—	GK	SVK	Martin Poláček (loan return from FK DAC 1904 Dunajská Streda)
—	MF	SVK	Matej Jakúbek (from MFK Dubnica)
—	DF	SVK	Martin Vrablec (loan return from ŠK SFM Senec)
—	FW	CZE	Pavel Fořt (from (Germany) Dynamo Dresden)

Out: Note: Flags indicate national team as defined under FIFA eligibility rules; some limited exceptions apply. Players may hold more than one non-FIFA nationality.

No.	Pos.	Nation	Player
1	GK	SVK	Pavel Kováč (loan return to MFK Dubnica)
2	DF	SVK	Filip Lukšík (loan return to (Netherlands) ADO Den Haag)
25	DF	SVK	Lukáš Pauschek (to (Czech Republic) AC Sparta Prague)
—	MF	SVK	Patrik Sabo (on loan to FC ViOn Zlaté Moravce)
—	MF	SVK	Róbert Vaniš (on loan to FC ViOn Zlaté Moravce)

=== Awards ===
This the list of awards awarded to ŠK Slovan Bratislava players during the season.

ŠK Slovan Bratislava Player of the Month

Month	Player
July 2013	(Slovakia) Juraj Halenár
August 2013	(Slovakia) Branislav Niňaj
September 2013	(Slovakia) Róbert Vittek
October 2013	(Serbia) Marko Milinković
November 2013	(Slovakia) Róbert Vittek
