= OFK Metacolor Ludanice =

Slovak football club

- Full name: OFK Metacolor Ludanice
- Founded: 1935
- Ground: Športový areál, Ludanice
- Capacity: 240
- Manager: Miloš Lintner
- League: 6. Liga
- 2015–16: 10th

OFK Metacolor Ludanice is a Slovak football team, based in the village of Ludanice. The club was founded in 1935.

== Current squad ==
Note: Flags indicate national team as defined under FIFA eligibility rules; some limited exceptions apply. Players may hold more than one non-FIFA nationality.

No.	Pos.	Nation	Player
—	DF	(Slovakia) SVK	Sylvester Otočka
—	DF	(Slovakia) SVK	Miloš Krško
—	FW	(Algeria) ALG	Belkacem Khadir
4	MF	(Slovakia) SVK	Milan Šnirc
5	MF	(Slovakia) SVK	Martin Čambal
—	MF	(Slovakia) SVK	Jozef Čertík
