= Jozef Čertík =

Slovak footballer

Personal information
- Full name: Jozef Čertík
- Date of birth: 29 April 1985 (age 41)
- Place of birth: Bojnice, Czechoslovakia
- Height: 1.78 m (5 ft 10 in)
- Position: Midfielder

Team information
- Current team: Branč

Youth career
- Prievidza

Senior career*
Years	Team	Apps	(Gls)
2002–2004	Rapid Bratislava		
2004–2005	Vítkovice		
2006–2010	Prešov		
2007	→ Prievidza (loan)		
2007	→ Dunajská Streda (loan)	6	(0)
2008	→ Prievidza (loan)		
2010	→ FK Bodva (loan)		
2011	Ludanice		
2011–2012	Čáslav	18	(1)
2012	→ Rimavská Sobota (loan)	19	(7)
2013	Sandecja Nowy Sącz	25	(1)
2014–2015	Rimavská Sobota	44	(10)
2015–2016	Sereď	28	(1)
2016–2017	Zvolen	27	(4)
2017–2018	Baník Prievidza	16	(1)
2018–2019	Union Mitterkirchen	22	(13)
2019–	Branč		
- * Club domestic league appearances and goals as of 29 April 2024

Jozef Čertík (born 29 April 1985) is a Slovak footballer who plays as a midfielder for Branč.
