= Miloš Krško =

Slovak footballer

Personal information
- Full name: Miloš Krško
- Date of birth: 23 October 1979 (age 47)
- Place of birth: Bojnice, Czechoslovakia
- Height: 1.86 m (6 ft 1 in)
- Position: Defender

Team information
- Current team: Baník Horná Nitra

Senior career*
Years	Team	Apps	(Gls)
1998–2000	Baník Horná Nitra	31	(0)
2000–2001	FK AS Trenčín	24	(2)
2001–2003	1. FC Brno	46	(2)
2003–2004	ŠK Slovan Bratislava	17	(0)
2004–2006	MŠK Žilina	42	(1)
2006	FK AS Trenčín	14	(0)
2007–2010	FC Dinamo Tbilisi	53	(0)
2010–2011	OFK Metacolor Ludanice	-	(-)
2011–2013	TJ Baník Ružiná	-	(-)
2013–	Baník Horná Nitra	-	(-)

International career
2000	Slovakia U-21		
2000	Slovakia U-23		

Managerial career
- 2024: OKF Branč
- 2025-: AC Nitra
- * Club domestic league appearances and goals as of 29 July 2014

Miloš Krško (born 23 October 1979 in Bojnice) is a Slovak football defender who plays for Baník Horná Nitra. He previously played for OFK Metacolor Ludanice.

== Club career ==
Krško previously played for FC Dinamo Tbilisi, MŠK Žilina, ŠK Slovan Bratislava, 1. FC Brno in the Czech Gambrinus liga and FK AS Trenčín.

== International career ==
Krško played for Slovakia at the 2000 Olympic Games in Sydney.
