= Branislav Niňaj =

Slovak international footballer

Personal information
- Date of birth: 17 May 1994 (age 32)
- Place of birth: Bratislava, Slovakia
- Height: 1.91 m (6 ft 3 in)
- Position: Centre-back

Team information
- Current team: Petržalka
- Number: 88

Youth career
- 2002–2010: Jozef Vengloš Academy
- 2010–2011: Petržalka 1898
- 2012: Slovan Bratislava

Senior career*
Years	Team	Apps	(Gls)
2011–2012	Petržalka 1898	10	(0)
2012–2015	Slovan Bratislava	58	(6)
2012–2015	Slovan Bratislava B	3	(0)
2015–2018	Lokeren	38	(1)
2017	→ Osmanlıspor (loan)	1	(0)
2018	→ Žilina B (loan)	2	(0)
2018–2021	Fortuna Sittard	53	(3)
2021–2025	Sepsi OSK	141	(2)
2025–	Podbrezová	11	(0)
2026	→ MFK Skalica (loan)	5	(0)
2026	Petržalka	0	(0)

International career^{‡}
- Slovakia U17
2012	Slovakia U18	2	(0)
2013	Slovakia U19	4	(0)
2013–2017	Slovakia U21	27	(1)
2013–2020	Slovakia	3	(0)
- * Club domestic league appearances and goals as of 23 May 2026 ‡ National team caps and goals as of 11 October 2020

Branislav Niňaj (born 17 May 1994) is a Slovak professional footballer who plays as a defender for Slovak club Petržalka.

== Early career ==
In summer 2012, he moved from Petržalka 1898 to the fellow Bratislava team Slovan Bratislava. He made his Corgoň Liga debut for Slovan 2013 against ViOn Zlaté Moravce on 1 March 2013, Slovan won this match 4–1.

== International career ==
Niňaj made an unexpected international debut under Ján Kozák on 19 November 2013 in a memorable first UEFA-recognised match against Gibraltar (0–0), when he tactically replaced Jakub Sylvestr in the 85th minute. However, he failed to make another appearance under Kozák until his resignation in October 2018.

After Niňaj joined Fortuna Sittard, where he experienced an incomparably more successful season to the previous ones, he was again nominated to the national team, initially as an alternate. Niňaj's first nomination to the national team nomination after over 5 years happened on 28 May 2019 when coach Pavel Hapal called him up for a double fixture in June - a home friendly against Jordan, to which, unusually, 29 players were called-up and a UEFA Euro 2020 qualifying fixture against Azerbaijan, played away on 11 June 2019. The squad was to be reduced to 23 players for the latter fixture.

== Career statistics ==
As of match played on 27 July 2025

Club statistics
Club	Season	League			National Cup		Continental		Other		Total	
Club	Season	Division	Apps	Goals	Apps	Goals	Apps	Goals	Apps	Goals	Apps	Goals
Slovan Bratislava	2012–13	Slovak First Football League	5	1	1	0	—		—		6	1
Slovan Bratislava	2013–14	Slovak First Football League	31	4	6	0	—		—		37	4
Slovan Bratislava	2014–15	Slovak First Football League	22	1	1	0	6	0	1 (Note: Appearance in the Slovak Super Cup)	0	30	1
Slovan Bratislava	Total		58	6	8	0	6	0	1	0	73	6
Slovan Bratislava B	2014–15	2. Liga	3	0	—		—		—		3	0
Lokeren	2015–16	Belgian Pro League	18	0	2	0	—		—		20	0
Lokeren	2016–17	Belgian First Division A	20	1	0	0	—		—		20	1
Lokeren	Total		38	1	2	0	0	0	0	0	40	1
Osmanlıspor (loan)	2017–18	Süper Lig	1	0	3	0	—		—		4	0
Žilina B (loan)	2017–18	2. Liga	2	0	—		—		—		2	0
Fortuna Sittard	2018–19	Eredivisie	21	3	2	0	—		—		23	3
Fortuna Sittard	2019–20	Eredivisie	24	0	3	0	—		—		27	0
Fortuna Sittard	2020–21	Eredivisie	8	0	0	0	—		—		8	0
Fortuna Sittard	Total		53	3	5	0	0	0	0	0	58	3
Sepsi OSK	2020–21	Liga I	16	0	0	0	—		1 (Note: appearance in Liga I play-offs for UEFA Europa Conference League)	0	17	0
Sepsi OSK	2021–22	Liga I	25	1	4	0	—		—		29	1
Sepsi OSK	2022–23	Liga I	34	0	3	1	2	0	—		39	1
Sepsi OSK	2023–24	Liga I	32	0	2	0	6	0	1 (Note: Appearance in the Supercupa României)	0	41	0
Sepsi OSK	2024–25	Liga I	34	1	0	0	—		—		34	1
Sepsi OSK	Total		141	2	9	1	8	0	2	0	160	3
Podbrezová	2025–26	Slovak First Football League	1	0	0	0	—		—		1	0
Career totals			297	12	27	1	14	0	3	0	341	13

=== International ===
As of match played on 11 November 2020.

Appearances and goals by national team and year
National team	Year	Apps	Goals
Slovakia	2013	1	0
Slovakia	2019	1	0
Slovakia	2020	1	0
Total		3	0

== Honours ==
Slovan Bratislava

- Slovak Super Liga: 2012–13, 2013–14
- Slovak Cup: 2012–13
- Slovak Super Cup: 2014

Sepsi OSK

- Cupa României: 2021–22, 2022–23
- Supercupa României: 2022
