= Martin Staško =

Slovak footballer

Personal information
- Full name: Martin Staško
- Date of birth: 21 August 1983 (age 43)
- Place of birth: Czechoslovakia
- Height: 1.84 m (6 ft 1/2 in)
- Position: Centre back

Team information
- Current team: MŠK Tesla Stropkov

Youth career
- Inter Bratislava

Senior career*
Years	Team	Apps	(Gls)
2007	LAFC Lučenec		
2008–2009	→Inter Bratislava loan	1	(0)
2009–2010	→MFK Petržalka loan	18	(0)
2011–2013	FC ŠTK 1914 Šamorín		
2014–2016	→MŠK Stropkov		
- * Club domestic league appearances and goals as of 5 September 2011

Martin Staško (born 21 August 1983) is a Slovak football defender who currently plays for club Breznica. He previously played for MFK Petržalka a FC ŠTK 1914 Šamorín.
