= Andrej Fišan =

Slovak footballer

Personal information
- Full name: Andrej Fišan
- Date of birth: 8 January 1985 (age 41)
- Place of birth: Brezno, Czechoslovakia
- Height: 1.87 m (6 ft 1 1/2 in)
- Position: Goalkeeper

Team information
- Current team: MFK Skalica
- Number: 30

Youth career
- Senica

Senior career*
| Years | Team | Apps | (Gls) |
| –2003 | Senica | | |
| 2003–2004 | Myjava | | |
| 2004–2005 | Senica | | |
| 2005–2007 | Močenok | | |
| 2007–2008 | Brezová pod Bradlom | | |
| 2009–2011 | Senica | 5 | (0) |
| 2011–2013 | Táborsko | 7 | (0) |
| 2013–2014 | Dunajská Streda | 5 | (0) |
| 2013–2014 | → Skalica (loan) | | |
| 2014–2018 | Skalica | 41 | (0) |
- * Club domestic league appearances and goals as of 17 December 2025

Andrej Fišan (born 8 January 1985) was a Slovak football goalkeeper who last played for Slovak First Football League club MFK Skalica.

== Club career ==
=== Early career ===
Fiša started his football career at FK Senica, where he went through all the youth categories. Later he worked his way up to the first team. Before the 2003/04 season, he transferred to TJ Spartak Myjava, from where he returned to Senica after a year. In August 2005, he became a player of ŠK Eldus Močenok. In the summer of 2007, Fišan headed to FK ŠVS Bradlan Brezová pod Bradlom, after an unsuccessful trial at Diósgyőri VTK.

=== Later career ===
In the winter transfer period of the 2008/09 season, Fišan returned to Senica for the second time. He played for the team in the 4th league and, after the club merged with FK Inter Bratislava in the summer of 2009, he played for the team in the top competition. In July 2011, Fišan signed for the Czech club FC Silon Táborsko. Before the 2013/14 season, he returned to Slovakia, joining DAC 1904 Dunajská Streda.

=== MFK Skalica ===
In September 2013, he went on loan to MFK Skalica. In the spring of 2014, he helped the team to advance to the 2nd league and in the summer of 2014, he transferred to the team. In the 2014/15 season, he advanced with the team to the First Football League. He made his first division debut in the Skalica jersey in a 4–1 loss against ŠK Slovan Bratislava. In 12 games, Fišan would keep only one clean sheet in a 0–0 draw against his former club Spartak Myjava.

In 2018, Fišan retired from professional football.
