= AC Nitra (football) =

Slovak football club

- Founded: 2022; 4 years ago
- Dissolved: 2026; 0 years ago (incorporated into FC Nitra)
- Stadium: Štadión pod Zoborom, Nitra, Slovakia
- Chairman: Džemil Šefkii
- Manager: Miloš Krško
- League: 5. Liga

AC Nitra (also referred to as AC Nitra - futbal) was a Slovak semi-professional football club based in the city of Nitra, Slovakia. The club last competed in the 5. Liga, the fifth tier of Slovak football. The club plays its home games in the Štadión pod Zoborom. The club was dissolved in 2026 and incorporated into FC Nitra as the club's reserve team.

== History ==
=== Beginnings ===
Physical education activities in Nitra started before 1909 with various sports like football, wrestling, swimming, fencing, tennis, and ice hockey. The Nitra Athletic Club (AC Nitra) was established in 1923. After WWII, the club revived but underwent several name changes due to political influences, eventually returning to TJ AC Nitra in 1964. In 1976, TJ Plastika and TJ AC Nitra merged into TJ Plastika Nitra, which operated until 1990, led by prominent local figures and factory directors. The organization gained recognition as a professional Physical Education Unit within the Czech Sports and Recreation Society, achieving success across multiple sports, including football, hockey, handball, table tennis, wrestling, chess, tennis, figure skating, and gymnastics, often at national and international levels. By 1990, the football team was the first to leave the organization.

=== Founding and early success ===
Following the relegation of local club FC Nitra, it was decided that a new club would be created for the city. AC Nitra would be founded in the following year of 2022. The club won the 8. Liga in its first season. No other team from 110 competitions in Slovakia was more dominated in goal and point averages than the club that season. In the next three years, the club would be promoted twice. They also won the 2025 edition of the Presidential Cup, beating FK Prakovce 4–0 in the final. In the 2025–26 Slovak Cup, AC Nitra were drawn with Slovak First Football League side, FC Spartak Trnava.

The club was dissolved in 2026 following the conclusion of the 2025–26 season, in which it won the 5. Liga and secured promotion to the fourth tier. The club was dissolved following its merger with FC Nitra. It subsequently became FC Nitra's reserve team and competed in the fourth tier during the 2026–27 season under the name FC Nitra B.

== Rivalries ==
AC Nitra had a rivalry with local club FK Nitra. In an 8th league derby match between the clubs, both teams needed a win to be promoted. In front of 1,632 supporters in the Štadión pod Zoborom, AC Nitra would win the match by a score of 6–0.

== Notable players ==
Notable players that have played in a professional league.

- (Slovakia) Miloš Šimončič
- (Slovakia) Martin Tóth
- (Slovakia) Matúš Paukner
- (Slovakia) Ľuboš Ilizi
