= Clement Ansah =

Ghanaian footballer (born 2005)

Personal information
- Date of birth: 2 January 2005 (age 21)
- Place of birth: Tema, Ghana
- Height: 1.85 m (6 ft 1 in)
- Position: Midfielder

Team information
- Current team: Trenčín
- Number: 16

Youth career
- –2023: Bofoakwa Tano FC

Senior career*
| Years | Team | Apps | (Gls) |
| 2023–2024 | Bofoakwa Tano FC | 13 | (0) |
| 2024–2025 | Shkupi | 27 | (1) |
| 2024 | → Çorum (loan) | 0 | (0) |
| 2025–2026 | DAC Dunajská Streda | 1 | (0) |
| 2026– | Trenčín | 4 | (0) |
- * Club domestic league appearances and goals as of 21 September 2026

Clement Ansah (born 2 January 2005) is a Ghanaian professional footballer who plays as a Midfielder for Slovak First League club Trenčín.

== Club career ==
Ansah joined Shkupi on January 11, 2024.

Ansah joined Turkish TFF 1. Lig club Çorum on loan on February 9, 2024.

Ansah joined DAC Dunajská Streda on August 19, 2025.
