= Kolíňany =

Village and municipality in Slovakia

Kolíňany Kolon
- Municipality
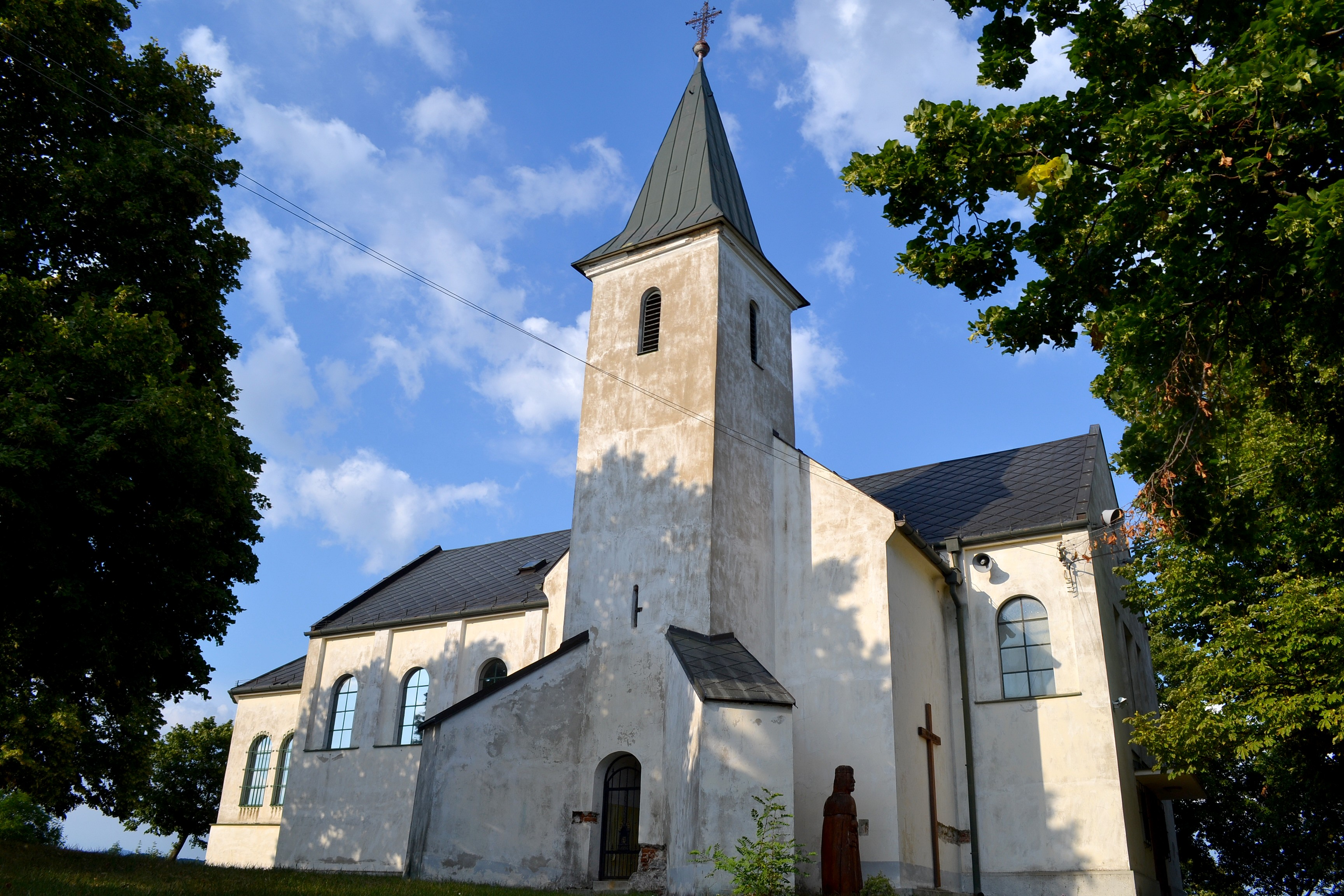
- Saint Stephen of Hungary church

- Flag

- Location of Kolíňany in the Nitra Region Location of Kolíňany in Slovakia
- Coordinates: 48.37°N 18.20°E
- Country: Slovakia
- Region: Nitra Region
- District: Nitra District
- First mentioned: 1113

Area
  - Total: 12.50 km^{2} (4.83 sq mi)
- Elevation: 199 m (653 ft)

Population (2025)
  - Total: 1,542
- Time zone: UTC+1 (CET)
  - Summer (DST): UTC+2 (CEST)
- Postal code: 951 78
- Area code: +421 37
- Vehicle registration plate (until 2022): NR
- Website: www.kolinany.eu

Kolíňany (Hungarian: Kolon) is a village and municipality in the Nitra District in western central Slovakia, in the Nitra Region.

== History ==
In historical records the village was first mentioned in 1113.

== Geography ==
The municipality lies at an altitude of 199 metres (653 ft) and covers an area of 12.50 km^{2} (4.83 sq mi) (2025).

== Population ==
Population statistic (10 years)
Year	1995	2005	2015	2025
Count	1397	1465	1600	1542
Difference		+4.86%	+9.21%	−3.62%

Population statistic
Year	2024	2025
Count	1558	1542
Difference		−1.02%

It has a population of 1542 people (31 December 2025).

=== Ethnicity ===
Census 2021 (1+ %)
Ethnicity	Number	Fraction
Slovak	908	58.54%
Hungarian	643	41.45%
Not found out	68	4.38%
Total	1551	

In year 2021 was 1551 people by ethnicity 908 as Slovak, 643 as Hungarian, 68 as Not found out, 5 as Rusyn, 4 as Ukrainian, 2 as Czech, 2 as Other, 1 as Romani, 1 as Austrian, 1 as German and 1 as English.

Note on population: The difference values of population numbers in the table "Population statistic" and in the sections "Ethnicity" & "Religion" is caused by the use of various statistical methods.

=== Religion ===
Census 2021 (1+ %)
Religion	Number	Fraction
Roman Catholic Church	1245	80.27%
None	191	12.31%
Not found out	55	3.55%
Total	1551	

In year 2021 was 1551 people by religion 1245 from Roman Catholic Church, 191 from None, 55 from Not found out, 13 from Evangelical Church, 9 from Greek Catholic Church, 7 from Christian Congregations in Slovakia, 6 from Paganism and natural spirituality, 6 from Ad hoc movements, 5 from Islam, 4 from Other, 3 from Calvinist Church, 2 from Other and not ascertained christian church, 1 from Old Catholic Church, 1 from Eastern Orthodox Church, 1 from Jehovah's Witnesses, 1 from Hinduism and 1 from Buddhism.

== Facilities ==
The village has a public library a gym and football pitch.

== See also ==
- List of municipalities and towns in Slovakia

== Genealogical resources ==
The records for genealogical research are available at the state archive "Statny Archiv in Nitra, Slovakia"

- Roman Catholic church records (births/marriages/deaths): 1780-1894 (parish A)
