= Patrik Šurnovský =

Slovak footballer (born 1997)

Personal information
- Full name: Patrik Šurnovský
- Date of birth: 13 November 1997 (age 29)
- Place of birth: Nové Zámky, Slovakia
- Height: 1.79 m (5 ft 10 in)
- Position: Left-back

Team information
- Current team: SV Horn
- Number: 97

Youth career
- –2015: ŠK Šurany
- 2012: → Nitra (loan)
- 2012–2013: → Slovan Duslo Šaľa (loan)
- 2013–2015: → Nitra (loan)
- 2016: Nitra

Senior career*
Years	Team	Apps	(Gls)
2016−2020	Nitra	24	(0)
2018	→ Komárno (loan)	29	(0)
2020−2021	Šurany		
2021	→ Komárno (loan)	12	(0)
2021–2023	Komárno	45	(3)
2023–2025	FC Petržalka	52	(1)
2025–	SV Horn	26	(2)
- * Club domestic league appearances and goals as of 27 June 2026

Patrik Šurnovský (born 13 November 1997) is a Slovak footballer who plays for Austrian club SV Horn as a left-back.

== Club career ==
Šurnovský made his professional Fortuna Liga debut for Nitra against Ružomberok on 9 March 2019. While Šurnovský had started in the starting XI, but was replaced by Pavol Farkaš a minute before stoppage time. The match concluded in a goal-less tie.
