= Dejan Peševski =

Macedonian footballer

Personal information
- Full name: Dejan Peševski; Дејан Пешевски
- Date of birth: 5 August 1993 (age 33)
- Place of birth: Kriva Palanka, Republic of Macedonia
- Height: 1.75 m (5 ft 9 in)
- Position: Attacking midfielder

Youth career
- FK Osogovo (Kriva Palanka)
- –2012: Hristo Stoichkov Academy

Senior career*
Years	Team	Apps	(Gls)
2013	Ružomberok	1	(0)
2013	Spartak Trnava	0	(0)
2014	ŽP Šport Podbrezová	0	(0)
2015	Koper	11	(0)
2015	Dukla Banská Bystrica	12	(3)
2016–2017	ŽP Šport Podbrezová	21	(2)
2017	→ Sereď (loan)	3	(0)
2019	Sklotatran Poltár	12	(1)

International career^{‡}
2013	Macedonia U21	3	(0)
2016	Macedonia	2	(0)
- * Club domestic league appearances and goals as of 5 June 2020 ‡ National team caps and goals as of 2 June 2016

Dejan Peševski (Macedonian: Дејан Пешевски; born 5 August 1993) is a Macedonian football midfielder.

== Club career ==
He made his professional debut for Ružomberok senior side on 3 April 2013 in the Corgoň Liga match against Nitra, entering in as a substitute in place of Lukáš Lupták.

== International career ==
He made his senior debut for Macedonia in a May 2016 friendly match against Azerbaijan and has earned a total of 2 caps, scoring no goals. His second and final international was a June 2016 friendly against Iran.
