= Martin Tóth =

Slovak footballer

Personal information
- Full name: Martin Tóth
- Date of birth: 13 October 1986 (age 40)
- Place of birth: Nitra, Czechoslovakia
- Height: 1.83 m (6 ft 0 in)
- Position: Centre-back

Team information
- Current team: AC Nitra

Youth career
- Nitra

Senior career*
Years	Team	Apps	(Gls)
2006–2012	Nitra	146	(3)
2012–2013	Slovan Liberec	4	(0)
2013–2018	Spartak Trnava	126	(2)
2019	Zagłębie Sosnowiec	11	(0)
2019–2022	ViOn Zlaté Moravce	63	(0)
2022–	AC Nitra	0	(0)
- * Club domestic league appearances and goals as of 29 July 2022

Martin Tóth (born 13 October 1986) is a Slovak footballer who plays for AC Nitra as a centre-back.

== Club career ==
He was signed by Spartak Trnava in July 2013 and made his debut for them against AS Trenčín on 21 July 2013.

== Honours ==
Spartak Trnava

- Slovak Super Liga: 2017–18
