= Patrik Johancsik =

Slovak footballer

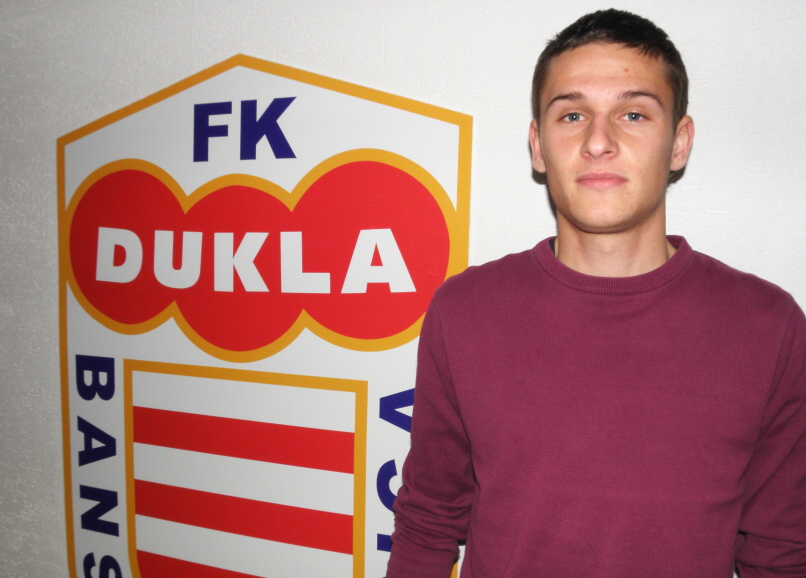

Personal information
- Date of birth: 9 May 1990 (age 36)
- Place of birth: Dunajská Streda, Czechoslovakia
- Height: 1.82 m (5 ft 11 1/2 in)
- Position: Striker

Team information
- Current team: Gabčíkovo (Head coach)

Youth career
- 1996–1999: FC Hubice
- 1999–2008: Jozef Vengloš Academy
- 2008–2009: Inter Bratislava

Senior career*
Years	Team	Apps	(Gls)
2009–2011	Petržalka	25	(7)
2009–2010	→ Topoľčany (loan)	14	(5)
2011–2013	Banská Bystrica	13	(1)
2012–2013	→ Dunajská Streda (loan)	20	(0)
2013	FC Stadlau	10	(4)
2013–2014	SV Hausleiten	17	(16)
2015	SC Orth	12	(10)
2015–2016	SK Pama	23	(12)
2017	SK Čakany		
2017	FK Baka		
2018	ŠTK Šamorín B		

Managerial career
- 2017–2020: ŠTK Šamorín (Youth & Reserves)
- 2020–: Gabčíkovo
- * Club domestic league appearances and goals

Patrik Johancsik (born 9 May 1990) is a Slovak retired footballer who played as a striker, and the head coach of ŠK 1923 Gabčíkovo.

== Career ==
=== Club career ===
Johancsik has previously played for Petržalka. In January 2011, he signed a three-year contract with Banská Bystrica. After a loan spell at Dunajská Streda, he moved to FC Stadlau, then in the fourth tier of Austrian football. He joined SV Hausleiten in 2013, but left the following year. He played for SC Orth between January 2015 and June 2015, and moved to SK Pama in July 2015.

=== Coaching career ===
In 2017, Johancsik became head coach of ŠTK Šamorín's U17 team. He later also coached the club's B team and the U15s.

In summer 2020, he became head coach of Gabčíkovo.
