= Michal Dian =

Slovak football midfielder

Personal information
- Full name: Michal Dian
- Date of birth: 13 November 1981 (age 44)
- Place of birth: Trnava, Czechoslovakia
- Height: 1.78 m (5 ft 10 in)
- Position: Midfielder

Team information
- Current team: Dunajská Streda
- Number: 20

Youth career
- Spartak Trnava

Senior career*
Years	Team	Apps	(Gls)
1999–2002	Spartak Trnava	21	(0)
2002	FC Untersiebenbrunn		
2004–2005	Příbram	0	(0)
2005–2010	Bohemians 1905	50	(11)
2007	→Zlín (loan)	7	(1)
2007	→Čáslav (loan)		
2008	→Hradec Králové (loan)		
2008–2009	→Čáslav (loan)		
2010–	Myjava	43	(12)
2013–	→ Dunajská Streda (loan)	0	(0)
- * Club domestic league appearances and goals as of 13 July 2013

Michal Dian (born 13 November 1981) is a Slovak football midfielder who currently plays for the Slovak Corgoň Liga club FK DAC 1904 Dunajská Streda, on loan from Spartak Myjava.
