= Ludanice =

Ludanice Nyitraludány
- Municipality
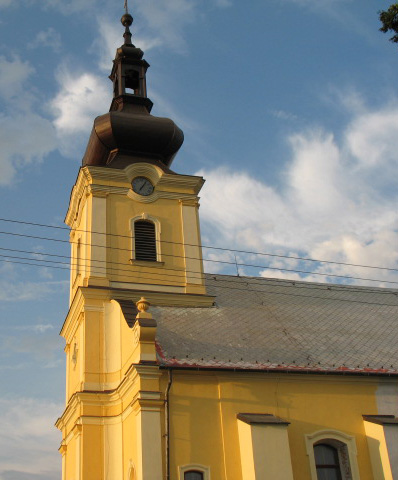

- Flag

- Location of Ludanice in the Nitra Region Location of Ludanice in Slovakia
- Coordinates: 48.50°N 18.12°E
- Country: Slovakia
- Region: Nitra Region
- District: Topoľčany District
- First mentioned: 1242

Area
  - Total: 11.20 km^{2} (4.32 sq mi)
- Elevation: 160 m (520 ft)

Population (2025)
  - Total: 1,717
- Time zone: UTC+1 (CET)
  - Summer (DST): UTC+2 (CEST)
- Postal code: 956 11
- Area code: +421 38
- Vehicle registration plate (until 2022): TO
- Website: www.ludanice.sk

Ludanice (Hungarian: Nyitraludány) is a municipality in the Topoľčany District of the Nitra Region, Slovakia.

== Geography ==
The municipality lies at an altitude of 160 metres (520 ft) and covers an area of 11.20 km^{2} (4.32 sq mi) (2025).

== Population ==
Population statistic (10 years)
Year	1995	2005	2015	2025
Count	1891	1817	1830	1717
Difference		−3.91%	+0.71%	−6.17%

Population statistic
Year	2024	2025
Count	1719	1717
Difference		−0.11%

It has a population of 1717 people (31 December 2025).

=== Ethnicity ===
Census 2021 (1+ %)
Ethnicity	Number	Fraction
Slovak	1692	94.31%
Not found out	92	5.12%
Total	1794	

In year 2021 was 1794 people by ethnicity 1692 as Slovak, 92 as Not found out, 9 as Czech, 6 as Hungarian, 3 as Russian, 3 as Other, 2 as Romanian, 2 as Greek, 1 as Ukrainian, 1 as Romani, 1 as Rusyn, 1 as Polish and 1 as German.

Note on population: The difference values of population numbers in the table "Population statistic" and in the sections "Ethnicity" & "Religion" is caused by the use of various statistical methods.

=== Religion ===
Census 2021 (1+ %)
Religion	Number	Fraction
Roman Catholic Church	1469	81.88%
None	190	10.59%
Not found out	90	5.02%
Total	1794	

In year 2021 was 1794 people by religion 1469 from Roman Catholic Church, 190 from None, 90 from Not found out, 14 from Evangelical Church, 6 from Christian Congregations in Slovakia, 6 from Ad hoc movements, 4 from Calvinist Church, 3 from Paganism and natural spirituality, 2 from Eastern Orthodox Church, 2 from Other and not ascertained christian church, 2 from Jehovah's Witnesses, 2 from Other, 1 from Old Catholic Church, 1 from Greek Catholic Church, 1 from United Methodist Church and 1 from Buddhism.

== Features ==
The most important sightseeing is a church from 1701. The village is quite developed as most of the villages in Topoľčany district.
