= Matúš Paukner =

Slovak footballer

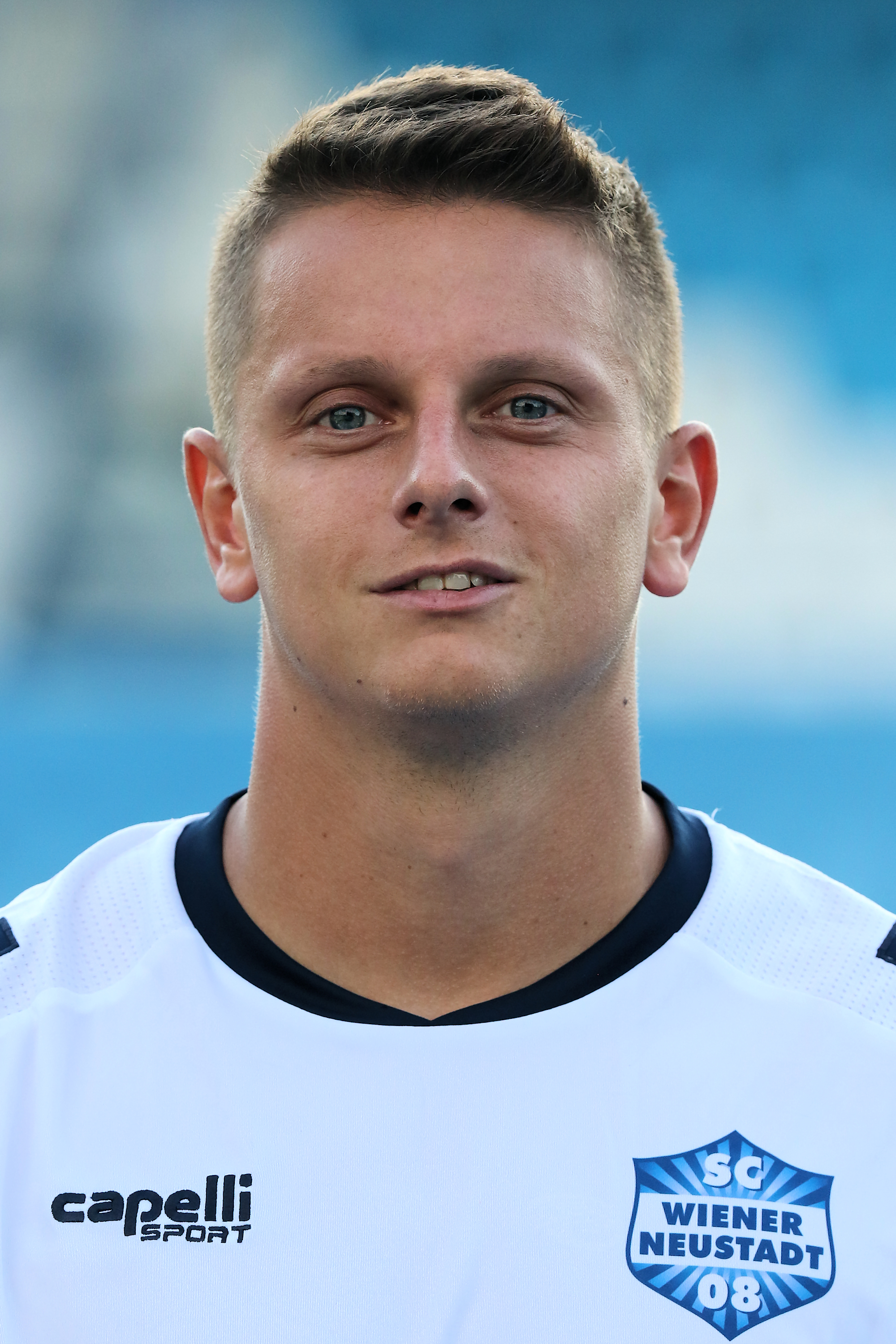
- Paukner in 2019

Personal information
- Date of birth: 20 June 1991 (age 35)
- Place of birth: Nitra, Czechoslovakia
- Height: 1.82 m (6 ft 0 in)
- Position: Forward

Team information
- Current team: Nitra
- Number: 10

Youth career
- 1997–2010: Nitra

Senior career*
Years	Team	Apps	(Gls)
2010–2015	Nitra	64	(38)
2013	→ Partizán Bardejov (loan)	12	(3)
2014	→ Gabčíkovo (loan)	13	(12)
2016	Békéscsaba	9	(1)
2016	Spartak Trnava	2	(1)
2017	Sereď	15	(11)
2017–2019	SV Horn	48	(27)
2019–2020	Wiener Neustadt	17	(12)
2020–2023	Bruck/Leitha	50	(43)
2023	Neusiedl/See	28	(10)
2024	FKM Nové Zámky	14	(12)
2025-2026	AC Nitra	59	(109)
2026-	Nitra	15	(24)
- * Club domestic league appearances and goals as of 28 September 2026

Matúš Paukner (born 20 June 1991) is a Slovak footballer who plays as a forward. He is a product of FC Nitra's youth system, for whom he has also made the most appearances. He also played for Spartak Trnava in the Slovak top division before moving to lower-tier clubs in Austria. He returned to Slovakia in 2024. During his two seasons with AC Nitra, competing in the sixth and fifth tiers of Slovak football as well as cup competitions, he scored a total of 121 goals. He currently plays for FC Nitra.

== Honours ==
=== Individual ===
- Slovak second division top scorer: 2014-15
