= Martin Vrablec =

Slovak footballer

Personal information
- Full name: Martin Vrablec
- Date of birth: 13 January 1992 (age 34)
- Place of birth: Malacky, Czechoslovakia
- Height: 1.80 m (5 ft 11 in)
- Position: Fullback

Youth career
- ČSFA Malacky
- 2007–2011: Slovan Bratislava

Senior career*
Years	Team	Apps	(Gls)
2011–2015	Slovan Bratislava	18	(0)
2013	→ Senec (loan)	9	(0)
2015	→ Zlaté Moravce (loan)	8	(0)
2015–2017	Skalica	16	(0)

International career^{‡}
2008–2009	Slovakia U17	2	(0)
2010–2011	Slovakia U19	5	(1)
- * Club domestic league appearances and goals as of 18 July 2017 ‡ National team caps and goals as of 25 May 2011

Martin Vrablec (born 13 January 1992) is a Slovak football defender who last played for MFK Skalica.

== Slovan Bratislava ==
He made his professional debut for the Slovan Bratislava senior side on 24 November 2012 in the Corgoň Liga match against AS Trenčín, coming on as an 88th-minute substitute for Igor Žofčák, in the 3–1 home win for the Slovan side.
