= Karol Mondek =

Slovak footballer

Personal information
- Full name: Karol Mondek
- Date of birth: 2 June 1991 (age 35)
- Place of birth: Martin, Czechoslovakia
- Height: 1.68 m (5 ft 6 in)
- Position: Winger

Team information
- Current team: FC Nitra

Youth career
- TJ Družstevník Blatnica
- Fomat Martin
- AS Trenčín

Senior career*
Years	Team	Apps	(Gls)
2010–2015	AS Trenčín	98	(5)
2012	→ AGOVV Apeldoorn (loan)	14	(0)
2015–2017	Baník Ostrava	47	(4)
2017–2019	Raków Częstochowa	39	(5)
2019–2021	Opava	60	(3)
2021–2026	ViOn Zlaté Moravce	144	(20)
2026-	FC Nitra	0	(0)
- * Club domestic league appearances and goals as of 25 May 2026

Karol Mondek (born 2 June 1991) is a Slovak professional footballer who plays as a winger for FC Nitra.

== Career statistics ==
As of 29 June 2015

Appearances and goals by club, season and competition
Club	Season	League			National cup (Note: Includes Slovak Cup)		Europe		Total	
Club	Season	Division	Apps	Goals	Apps	Goals	Apps	Goals	Apps	Goals
AS Trenčín	2010–11	2. Liga	15	0	2	0	—		17	0
AS Trenčín	2011–12	Slovak First League	6	0	0	0	—		6	0
AS Trenčín	Career total		21	0	2	0	—		23	0
AGOVV Apeldoorn	2011–12	Eerste Divisie	14	0	—		—		14	0
AS Trenčín	2012–13	Slovak First League	23	1	2	0	0	0	25	1
AS Trenčín	2013–14	Slovak First League	26	4	1	0	4 (Note: Appearances in UEFA Europa League)	0	31	4
AS Trenčín	2014–15	Slovak First League	28	0	7	1	4	0	39	1
AS Trenčín	Career total		77	0	10	1	8	0	95	6
Career total			112	5	12	1	8	0	132	6

== Honours ==
AS Trenčín

- Slovak First Football League: 2014–15
- Slovak Cup: 2014–15

Raków Częstochowa

- I liga: 2018–19
