= Štadión pod Zoborom =

Football stadium in Nitra, Slovakia

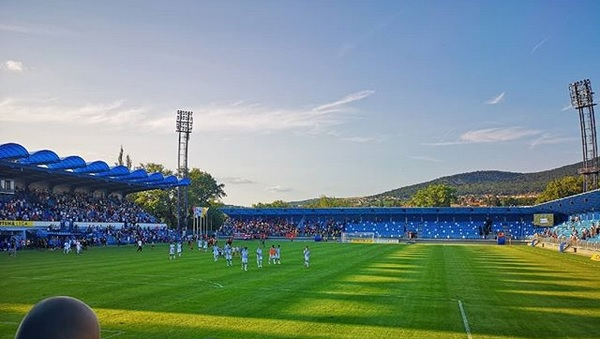
- UEFA
- Interactive map of Štadión pod Zoborom
- Location: Nitra, Slovakia
- Coordinates: 48.3218565°N 18.087506°E
- Owner: Nitrianska investičná, s. r. o.
- Capacity: 7,246
- Surface: Grass
- Field size: 105×68 m

Construction
- Opened: 1909
- Renovated: 1951-1955, 1979, 2018
- Cost: €7.9 million renovation in 2018

Tenants
- FC Nitra (1909–present); ŠKF Sereď (2018–2020); Nitra Knights (2023–present); AC Nitra (2022–2026); UEFA U-17 Championship (2013); UEFA U-21 Championship (2025)

Štadión FC Nitra (English: FC Nitra Stadium), commonly known as Štadión pod Zoborom (English: Stadium beneath Zobor), is a multi-purpose stadium in the city of Nitra, Slovakia, located next to Sihoť Park beneath Nitra Castle. The stadium is primarily used for football matches and serves as the home ground of FC Nitra and has also been the home ground of the American football club Nitra Knights since 2023. The stadium underwent a complete reconstruction in 2018, following which its official capacity is 7,246.

In addition to FC Nitra, the stadium has also hosted matches involving AC Nitra and ŠKF Sereď in the past, as ŠKF Sereď's home stadium did not meet league requirements.

== History ==
The site of the present-day stadium has been used for sporting purposes since the beginning of the 20th century. The original football pitch stood on the site of the present-day ice hockey arena, which is located immediately next to the current football stadium. By the 1930s, the stadium already had a grandstand for spectators. The site of the present-day football stadium was occupied by an outdoor ice hockey rink with temporary grandstands used by the local ice hockey club. The two pitches were located immediately next to each other.

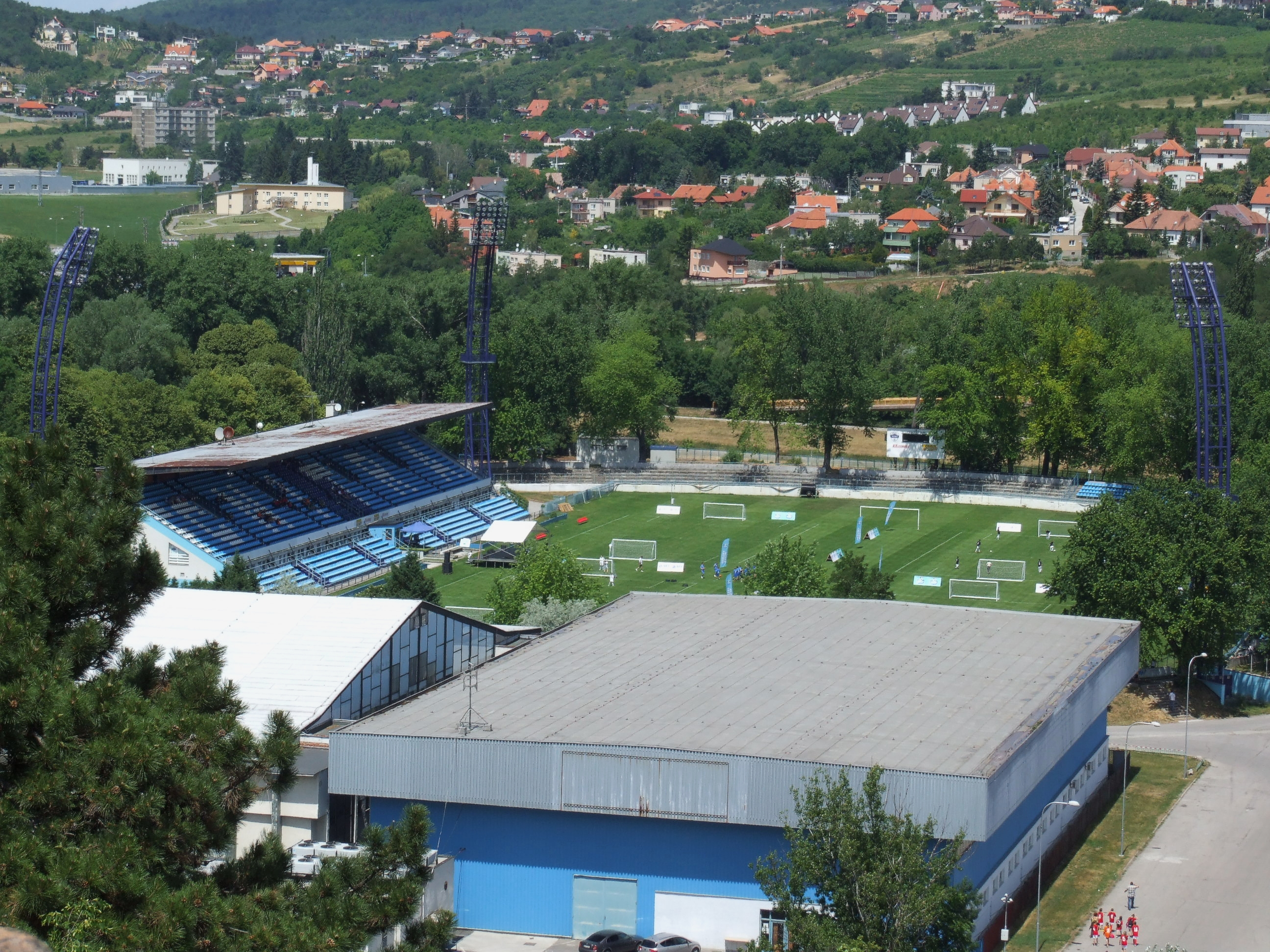
Štadión pod Zoborom photographed from above in 2012. In the background is the original northern stand, built in 1955, which was part of the original stadium, whose concrete stands surrounded the entire ground. On the western side is the main stand, built in 1979. The stadium remained in this configuration until its redevelopment in 2018. At the bottom of the photograph is the ice hockey arena, with its adjacent covered ice rink.

Construction of the present-day football stadium at its current site began in 1951. An athletics track was built around the football pitch, with a concrete grandstand constructed around the track. Construction was completed in 1955. In the same year, construction began on a new uncovered artificial ice rink on the site of the original football pitch. The two stadiums had thus effectively swapped locations. Following the construction of the new stadium with concrete stands, some record attendances were close to 20,000 spectators. However, these attendances exceeded the stadium's official capacity.

In 1979, part of the western grandstand was demolished and replaced by a new, modern main stand. In addition to football matches, the stadium was also used for other purposes during the Czechoslovak era, including Spartakiad mass exercises. In 1955, an additional football training pitch with a cinder surface was also constructed within the sports complex.

Following the completion of the new main stand and further improvements, almost 15,000 spectators attended the match between Plastika Nitra and 1. FC Köln on 26 September 1989. However, this attendance exceeded the stadium's capacity, and the official attendance was therefore recorded as 8,556 spectators.

=== Recent history and stadium redevelopment ===
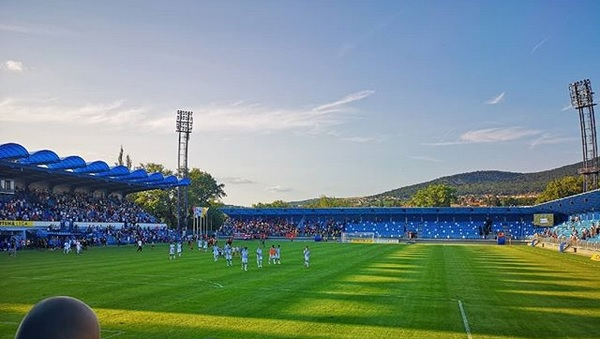
A photograph of the stadium taken in 2018 following its redevelopment. The original concrete stands were replaced with new stands located directly alongside the pitch, resulting in the removal of the former athletics track around the pitch. The main stand was also renovated as part of the redevelopment.

In 2007, floodlights were installed at the stadium, and plastic seats were added to the stands. In 2018, the stadium was renovated at an estimated cost of €7.9 million. The Slovak Football Association provided €2.4 million of the costs, with the city of Nitra providing €5.5 million.

Following the redevelopment, the stadium's capacity was initially planned to increase to 7,480 seats. However, upon completion, its final capacity was set at 7,246, with all spectator accommodation consisting of seated places. As part of the redevelopment, three of the original stands were completely demolished and replaced with new ones, while the main stand was extensively renovated and was the only original stand to be retained. A heated natural grass pitch was also installed. The redevelopment cost approximately €7,9 million. The stadium currently meets the requirements for UEFA Category 3.

== Transport connections ==
The stadium is located immediately next to Sihoť Park in the city of Nitra, directly beneath Nitra Castle. A large car and bus parking area is located in front of the stadium. Next to the car park is a stop for city bus route 35, which runs from the Klokočina housing estate through the city centre to the stadium. Other city bus services stop approximately 700 metres from the stadium at the Predmostie bus stop, including routes 1, 6, 9, 10, 17, 26, 27 and 30.

== International football matches ==
=== Slovak national team ===
27 March 1996 International Friendly	Slovakia	4–0	Belarus	Nitra, Slovakia
Match 18	Július Šimon 24'; Jaroslav Timko 32'; Marek Ujlaky 61'; Jozef Juriga 83'	Report		Stadium: Štadión pod Zoborom; Attendance: 3,058; Referee: Marek Kowalczyk

24 May 2000 International Friendly	Slovakia	1–1	Saudi Arabia	Nitra, Slovakia
Match 69	Vladimír Kožuch 37'	Report	Nawaf Al Temyat 12'	Stadium: Štadión pod Zoborom

=== 2013 UEFA European Under-17 Championship ===
5 May 2013 Group B	Croatia	0–0	Italy	Nitra, Slovakia
17:30 CEST		Report		Stadium: Štadión pod Zoborom; Attendance: 2,367; Referee: Neil Doyle (Republic of Ireland)

8 May 2013 Group B	Ukraine	1–2	Italy	Nitra, Slovakia
18:00 CEST	Vachiberadze 61'	Report	Parigini 75'; Pugliese 80+3'	Stadium: Štadión pod Zoborom; Attendance: 2,110; Referee: Slavko Vinčić (Slovenia)

11 May 2013 Group B	Italy	1–1	Russia	Nitra, Slovakia
19:30 CEST	Capradossi 43'	Report	Gasilin 12'	Stadium: Štadión pod Zoborom; Attendance: 1,560; Referee: Serdar Gözübüyük (Netherlands)

=== 2025 UEFA European Under-21 Championship ===
12 June 2025 Group B	Germany	3–0	Slovenia	Nitra, Slovakia
21:00	Woltemade 19', 42', 82' (pen.)	Report		Stadium: Štadión pod Zoborom; Attendance: 2,708; Referee: Jakob Sundberg (Denmark)

15 June 2025 Group B	England	0–0	Slovenia	Nitra, Slovakia
18:00		Report		Stadium: Štadión pod Zoborom; Attendance: 5,217; Referee: Goga Kikacheishvili (Georgia)

18 June 2025 Group B	England	1–2	Germany	Nitra, Slovakia
21:00	Scott 76'	Report	Knauff 3'; Weiper 33'	Stadium: Štadión pod Zoborom; Attendance: 5,624; Referee: Sander van der Eijk (Netherlands)

== Image gallery ==
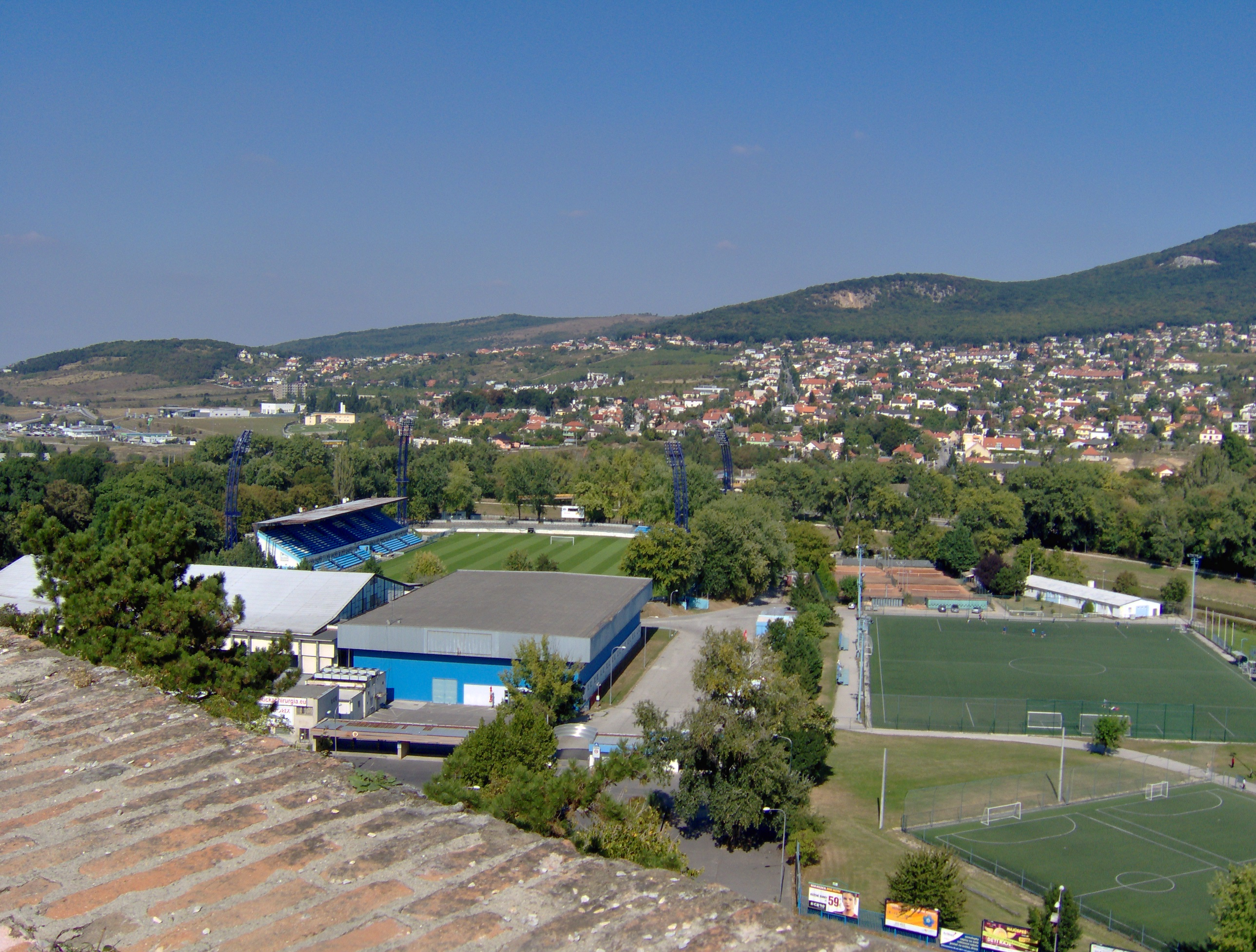
View of the stadium from Nitra Castle before its redevelopment.

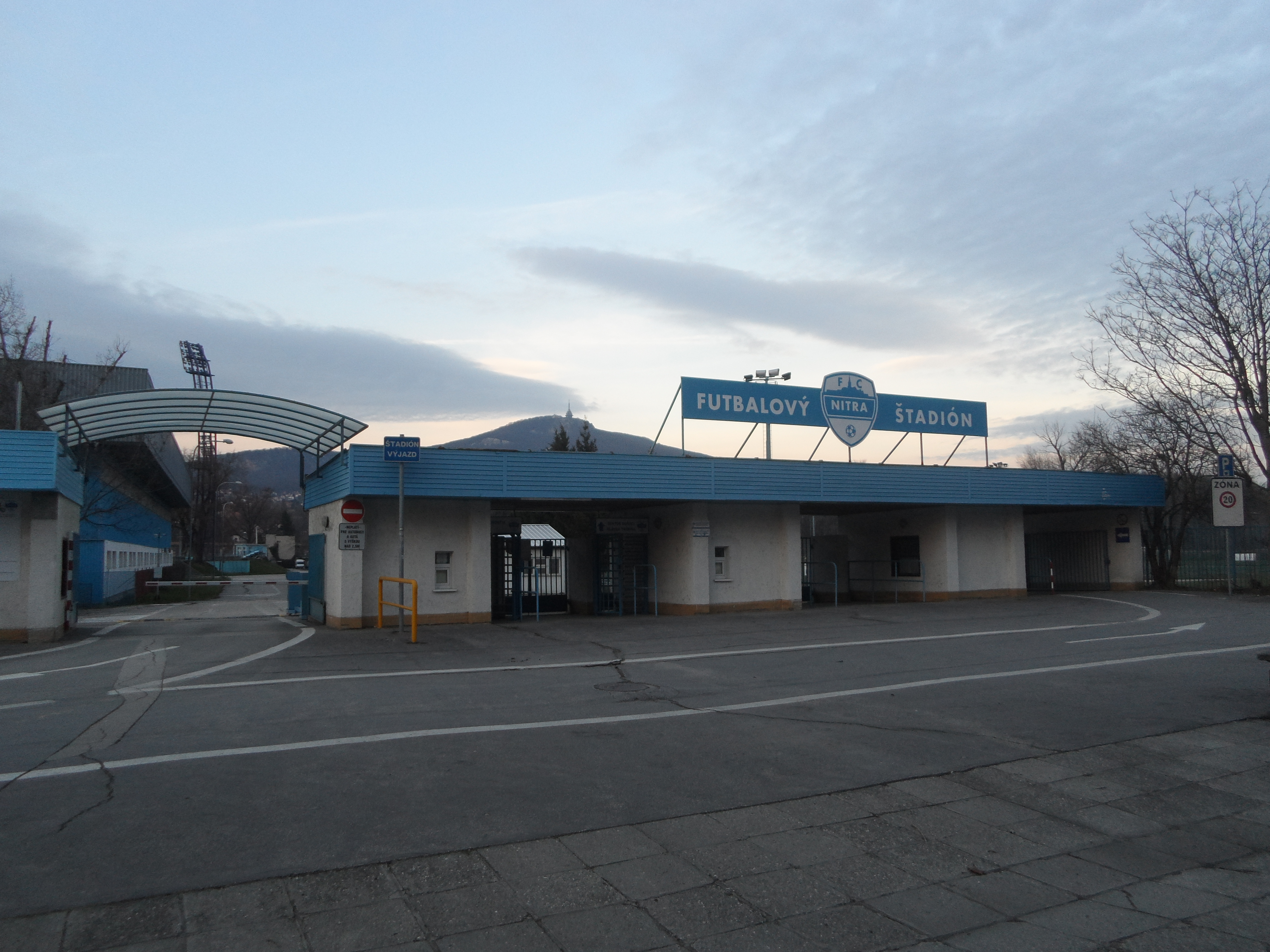
The main entrance to the FC Nitra sports complex, where the stadium is located.

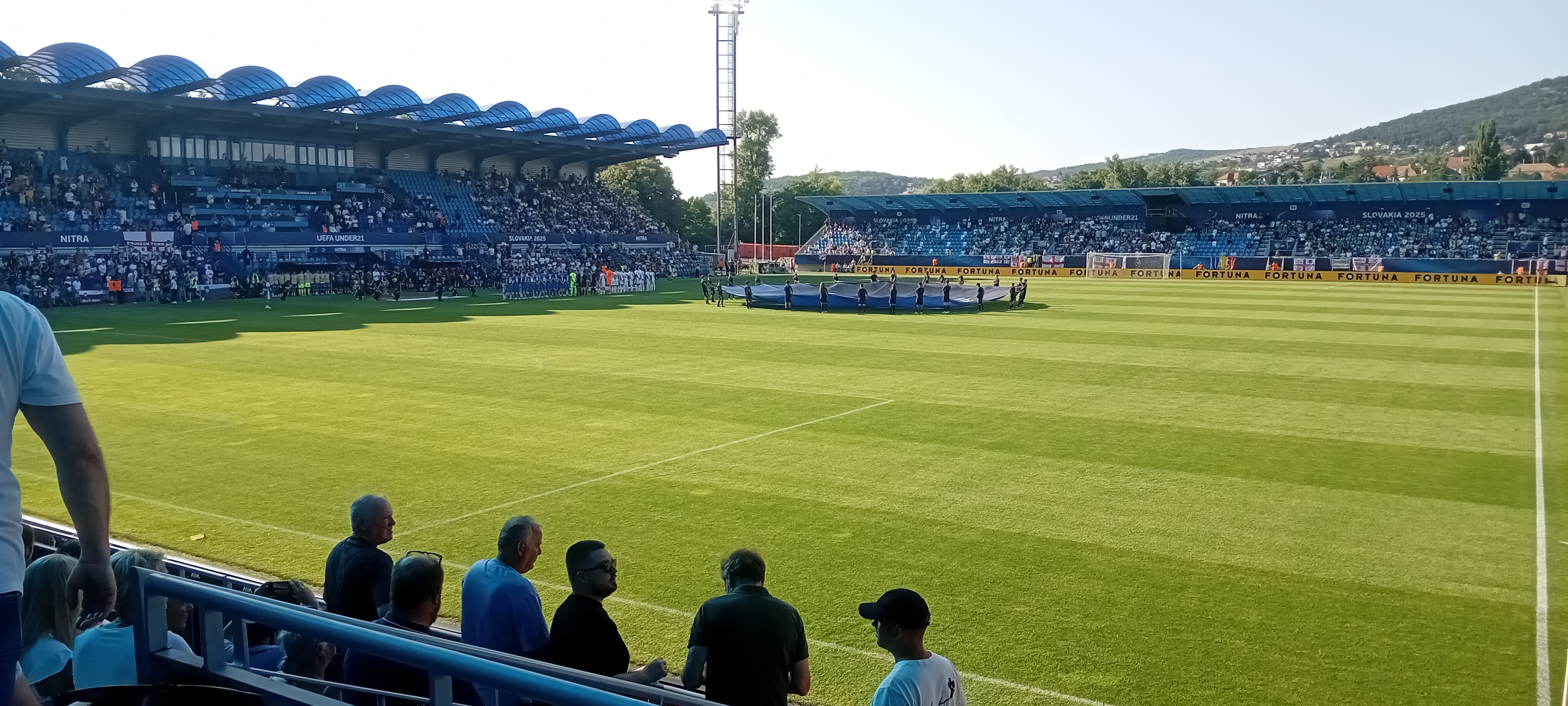
England vs Slovenia in Nitra.
