= Pavel Fořt =

Czech footballer

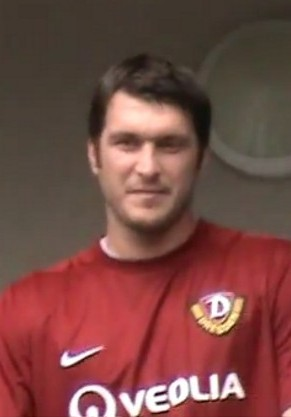
- Fořt with Dresden in 2011.

Personal information
- Full name: Pavel Fořt
- Date of birth: 26 June 1983 (age 43)
- Place of birth: Plzeň, Czechoslovakia
- Height: 1.88 m (6 ft 2 in)
- Position: Forward

Youth career
- 1989–1996: TJ SU Heřmanova Huť
- 1996–1997: SK Slavia Vejprnice
- 1997–2000: Viktoria Plzeň

Senior career*
Years	Team	Apps	(Gls)
2000–2003	Viktoria Plzeň	55	(29)
2003–2006	Slavia Prague	80	(21)
2007–2009	Toulouse	9	(0)
2007–2008	→ Brussels (loan)	11	(2)
2009	→ Slavia Prague (loan)	14	(5)
2009–2011	Arminia Bielefeld	30	(10)
2011–2013	Dynamo Dresden	41	(9)
2013–2014	Slovan Bratislava	25	(13)
2015	Příbram	6	(1)
2015–2017	TJ Jiskra Domažlice	0	(0)
2016	→Viktoria Plzeň	4	(0)

International career^{‡}
1998–1999	Czech Republic U-15	5	(1)
1999–2000	Czech Republic U-16	12	(2)
2001	Czech Republic U-17	6	(3)
2001–2002	Czech Republic U-19	12	(7)
2002–2003	Czech Republic U-20	6	(2)
2003–2005	Czech Republic U-21	6	(1)
- * Club domestic league appearances and goals as of 7 January 2023 ‡ National team caps and goals as of 19 May 2010

Pavel Fořt (born 26 June 1983) is a retired Czech footballer.

== Career ==
Fořt left Slavia Prague for Toulouse. On 24 January 2007, he played his first Ligue 1 match against Nice. On 16 January 2009, he joined Slavia Prague on loan and on 14 July 2009 signed with Arminia Bielefeld. Two years later, after Bielefeld's relegation to the 3. Liga, he signed for Dynamo Dresden, who had been promoted to the 2. Bundesliga.
