= 2013–14 FC ViOn Zlaté Moravce season =

ViOn Zlaté Moravce
2013–14 season
- Owner: Viliam Ondrejka
- President: Karol Škula
- Manager: Juraj Jarábek (until 28 May 2013); Branislav Mráz (from 28 May 2013)
- Stadium: Štadión FC ViOn
- Slovak First Football League: 10th
- Slovak Cup: Quarter-finals
- Top goalscorer: League: Martin Pribula (8); All: Martin Pribula (12)
- Highest home attendance: 3,420 v Spartak Trnava (23 August 2013, Slovak First Football League)
- Lowest home attendance: 500 v Senica (5 November 2013, Slovak Cup)
- Average home league attendance: 1,531
- Biggest win: 3–0 v Nitra (Home, 9 November 2013, Slovak First Football League); 3–0 v Nitra (Away, 26 April 2014, Slovak First Football League)
- Biggest defeat: 0–5 v Trenčín (Away, 17 September 2013, Slovak First Football League)

The 2013–14 season was Football Club Viliam Ondrejka Zlaté Moravce's 4th consecutive season in Slovak First Football League. In addition to the domestic league, ViOn Zlaté Moravce participated in this season's editions of Slovak Cup.

== Squad ==
Note: Flags indicate national team as defined under FIFA eligibility rules; some limited exceptions apply. Players may hold more than one non-FIFA nationality.

| No. | Pos. | Nation | Player |
|---|---|---|---|
| 1 | GK | SVK | Patrik Brezina |
| 5 | DF | SVK | Patrik Pavlenda |
| 7 | MF | SVK | Lukáš Kováč |
| 8 | MF | SVK | Martin Ondrejka |
| 9 | FW | SVK | Adrián Candrák |
| 10 | MF | SVK | Martin Pribula (on loan from Prešov) |
| 11 | DF | SVK | Michal Pintér |
| 12 | DF | SVK | Martin Chren |
| 13 | MF | SVK | Martin Babic (captain) |
| 15 | FW | SVK | Ľubomír Bernáth |
| 17 | MF | SVK | Patrik Sabo |
| 18 | MF | SVK | Peter Orávik |

| No. | Pos. | Nation | Player |
|---|---|---|---|
| 19 | DF | SVK | Pavol Majerník (vice-captain) |
| 22 | GK | SVK | Martin Kuciak |
| 23 | DF | SVK | Peter Farkaš |
| 27 | FW | SVK | Lukáš Szabó (on loan from Slovan Liberec) |
| 28 | MF | BRA | Bolinha (on loan from Senica) |
| 29 | FW | SVK | Lukáš Mihálik |
| 31 | FW | SVK | Karol Pavelka |
| 32 | FW | BIH | Irfan Hadžić |
| 37 | FW | SVK | Peter Mazan |
| 44 | DF | SVK | Peter Chrappan |
| — | DF | SVK | Roman Zembera |

== Transfers ==
=== Summer ===
In: Note: Flags indicate national team as defined under FIFA eligibility rules; some limited exceptions apply. Players may hold more than one non-FIFA nationality.

| No. | Pos. | Nation | Player |
|---|---|---|---|
| — | MF | SVK | Martin Babic (loan return from FK Senica) |
| — | MF | SVK | Juraj Tomášek (loan return from ŠK SFM Senec) |
| — | MF | SVK | Juraj Pilát (loan return from ŠKF Sereď) |
| — | DF | SVK | Peter Farkaš (loan return from FK Spartak Vráble) |
| — | MF | SVK | Mário Kajaba (loan return from FK Spartak Vráble) |
| — | FW | SVK | Ladislav Žák (loan return from AFC Nové Mesto nad Váhom) |
| — | MF | SVK | Martin Pribula (on loan from 1. FC Tatran Prešov) |
| — | MF | SVK | Michal Obročník (on loan from (Czech Republic) FC Slovan Liberec) |
| — | FW | SRB | Samir Nurković (on loan from MFK Košice) |
| — | MF | SVK | Patrik Sabo (on loan from ŠK Slovan Bratislava) |
| — | MF | SVK | Róbert Vaniš (on loan from ŠK Slovan Bratislava) |
| — | MF | SVK | Peter Mazan (on loan from FK AS Trenčín) |
| — | DF | SVK | Peter Chrappan (on loan from FK Dukla Banská Bystrica) |
| — | FW | SVK | Lukáš Szabo (on loan from (Czech Republic) FC Slovan Liberec) |

Out: Note: Flags indicate national team as defined under FIFA eligibility rules; some limited exceptions apply. Players may hold more than one non-FIFA nationality.

| No. | Pos. | Nation | Player |
|---|---|---|---|
| — | FW | SVK | Karol Mészáros (loan return to ŠK Slovan Bratislava) |
| — | MF | SVK | Milan Škriniar (loan return to MŠK Žilina) |
| — | MF | SVK | Michal Obročník (loan return to (Czech Republic) FC Slovan Liberec) |
| — | FW | SVK | Andrej Hodek (to FC Spartak Trnava) |
| — | DF | SVK | Marcel Ondráš (loan return to MŠK Žilina) |
| — | FW | SRB | Samir Nurković (Released) |

=== Winter ===
In: Note: Flags indicate national team as defined under FIFA eligibility rules; some limited exceptions apply. Players may hold more than one non-FIFA nationality.

| No. | Pos. | Nation | Player |
|---|---|---|---|
| — | FW | SVK | Karol Pavelka (from (Czech Republic) MFK Karviná) |
| — | MF | SVK | Márius Charizopulos (on loan from ČFK Nitra) |
| — | FW | BIH | Irfan Hadžić (from (Croatia) NK Inter Zaprešić) |
| — | GK | SVK | Jozef Novota (on loan from OFK Sľažany) |
| — | FW | SVK | Ladislav Žák (loan return from MFK Topvar Topoľčany) |

Out: Note: Flags indicate national team as defined under FIFA eligibility rules; some limited exceptions apply. Players may hold more than one non-FIFA nationality.

| No. | Pos. | Nation | Player |
|---|---|---|---|
| — | MF | SVK | Patrik Sabo (loan return to ŠK Slovan Bratislava) |
| — | DF | SVK | Róbert Vaniš (loan return to ŠK Slovan Bratislava) |
| — | MF | SVK | Michal Obročník (loan return to (Czech Republic) FC Slovan Liberec) |
| — | FW | SVK | Ľubomír Bernáth (Released) |
| — | DF | SVK | Peter Farkaš (on loan to FK Spartak Vráble) |

== Competitions ==
=== Overview ===
| Competition | First match | Last match | Starting round | Final position | Record | | | | | | | |
| Competition | First match | Last match | Starting round | Final position | Pld | W | D | L | GF | GA | GD | Win % |
|---|---|---|---|---|---|---|---|---|---|---|---|---|
| Slovak First Football League | 13 July 2013 | 31 May 2014 | Matchday 1 | 10th | 33 | 11 | 5 | 17 | 36 | 47 | −11 | 33.33 |
| Slovak Cup | 28 August 2013 | 5 November 2013 | Second round | Quarter-finals | 4 | 2 | 0 | 2 | 7 | 8 | −1 | 50.00 |
| Total | | | | | 37 | 13 | 5 | 19 | 43 | 55 | −12 | 35.14 |

Source: Competitions

=== Slovak First Football League ===
==== League table ====
| Pos | Team | Pld | W | D | L | GF | GA | GD | Pts | Qualification or relegation |
|---|---|---|---|---|---|---|---|---|---|---|
| 8 | Dukla Banská Bystrica | 33 | 11 | 9 | 13 | 48 | 48 | 0 | 42 | |
| 9 | Žilina | 33 | 11 | 7 | 15 | 49 | 50 | −1 | 40 | |
| 10 | ViOn Zlaté Moravce | 33 | 11 | 5 | 17 | 36 | 47 | −11 | 38 | |
| 11 | DAC Dunajská Streda (Note: Dunajská Streda were deducted six points at the end of the season due to match-fixing.) | 33 | 8 | 8 | 17 | 29 | 57 | −28 | 26 | |
| 12 | Nitra (R) | 33 | 6 | 8 | 19 | 33 | 63 | −30 | 26 | Relegation to 2. liga West |

Source: Niké liga (in Slovak)
Rules for classification: 1) points; 2) goal difference; 3) number of goals scored.
(R) Relegated

==== Results summary ====
| Overall | | | | | | | | Home | | | | | | Away | | | | | |
| Pld | W | D | L | GF | GA | GD | Pts | W | D | L | GF | GA | GD | W | D | L | GF | GA | GD |
|---|---|---|---|---|---|---|---|---|---|---|---|---|---|---|---|---|---|---|---|
| 33 | 11 | 5 | 17 | 36 | 47 | −11 | 38 | 7 | 3 | 6 | 20 | 19 | +1 | 4 | 2 | 11 | 16 | 28 | −12 |

Source: Corgoň Liga

==== Results by round ====
| Round | 1 | 2 | 3 | 4 | 5 | 6 | 7 | 8 | 9 | 10 | 11 | 12 | 13 | 14 | 15 | 16 | 17 | 18 | 19 | 20 | 21 | 22 | 23 | 24 | 25 | 26 | 27 | 28 | 29 | 30 | 31 | 32 | 33 |
|---|---|---|---|---|---|---|---|---|---|---|---|---|---|---|---|---|---|---|---|---|---|---|---|---|---|---|---|---|---|---|---|---|---|
| Ground | A | H | A | A | H | A | H | A | H | A | H | H | A | H | H | A | H | A | H | A | A | A | A | H | A | A | H | A | H | A | H | H | H |
| Result | L | L | L | W | D | W | W | L | D | L | W | D | W | W | W | L | W | L | L | L | L | D | D | W | L | L | L | W | L | L | W | L | L |
| Position | 10 | 11 | 11 | 10 | 10 | 10 | 8 | 8 | 9 | 10 | 9 | 9 | 7 | 6 | 5 | 6 | 5 | 6 | 8 | 8 | 9 | 9 | 9 | 8 | 9 | 9 | 9 | 9 | 9 | 9 | 9 | 9 | 10 |
| Points | 0 | 0 | 0 | 3 | 4 | 7 | 10 | 10 | 11 | 11 | 14 | 15 | 18 | 21 | 24 | 24 | 27 | 27 | 27 | 27 | 27 | 28 | 29 | 32 | 32 | 32 | 32 | 35 | 35 | 35 | 38 | 38 | 38 |

Source: Corgoň Liga
A = Away; H = Home; W = Win; D = Draw; L = Loss

==== Matches ====
| 13 July 2013 1 | Košice | 2–0 | ViOn Zlaté Moravce | Košice |
| 17:00 CEST (UTC+2) | Bukata (yellow card) 27'; Viazanko 29'; Diaby 90' | Report | Farkaš (yellow card) 58' | Stadium: Štadión Lokomotívy v Čermeli; Attendance: 1,860; Referee: Kamil Horváth; Assistant referees: Ondrej Brendza, Karol Poláček |

| 19 July 2013 2 | ViOn Zlaté Moravce | 1–3 | Ružomberok | Zlaté Moravce |
| 19:30 CEST (UTC+2) | Nurković 10', (yellow card) 31'; Pavlenda (yellow card) 90' | Report | Ďubek 41', 47'; Tawamba 43' | Stadium: Štadión FC ViOn; Attendance: 1,224; Referee: Vladimír Vnuk; Assistant referees: Miroslav Benko, Peter Chládek |

| 28 July 2013 3 | Žilina | 3–1 | ViOn Zlaté Moravce | Žilina |
| 17:30 CEST (UTC+2) | Pich 47' (pen.); Hučko 63'; Jelić 78'; Zuziak (yellow card) 90' | Report | Bolinha (yellow card) 10'; Orávik (yellow card) 28'; Nurković (yellow card) 34'; Pavlenda (yellow card) 46'; Obročník (yellow card) 70'; P. Sabo 84' | Stadium: Štadión pod Dubňom; Attendance: 2,129; Referee: Ivan Kružliak; Assistant referees: Erik Weiss, Michal Tomčík |

| 3 August 2013 4 | DAC Dunajská Streda | 0–1 | ViOn Zlaté Moravce | Dunajská Streda |
| 17:00 CEST (UTC+2) | Velický (yellow card) 28'; Sedlák (yellow card) 64'; Majerník (yellow card) 90' | Report | Mazan (yellow card) 19'; Orávik (yellow card) 54'; Obročník (yellow card) 70'; Pribula 90' | Stadium: DAC Stadion; Attendance: 1,577; Referee: Patrik Hrčka; Assistant referees: Mária Súkeníková, Tomáš Mókoš |

| 10 August 2013 5 | ViOn Zlaté Moravce | 0–0 | Dukla Banská Bystrica | Zlaté Moravce |
| 19:30 CEST (UTC+2) | Candrák (yellow card) 35' | Report | Brašeň (yellow card) 52'; Ľupták (yellow card) 71'; Jurčo (yellow card) 86' | Stadium: Štadión FC ViOn; Attendance: 1,286; Referee: Pavol Šuniar; Assistant referees: Peter Jenčura, Peter Bóllo |

| 17 August 2013 6 | Nitra | 2–3 | ViOn Zlaté Moravce | Nitra |
| 19:30 CEST (UTC+2) | Šimončič (yellow card) 28'; Gajdoš (yellow card) 55'; Benčík (yellow card) 77'; Dubeň 85'; Paukner (yellow card) 88'; Barroso 90' | Report | Pribula 7', 63'; Orávik 58' | Stadium: Štadión pod Zoborom; Attendance: 1,865; Referee: Martin Ježík; Assistant referees: Tomáš Somoláni, Martin Špivák |

| 23 August 2013 7 | ViOn Zlaté Moravce | 2–0 | Spartak Trnava | Zlaté Moravce |
| 19:30 CEST (UTC+2) | L. Kováč 10'; Pintér 16'; Chrappan (yellow card) 42' | Report | Grabež (yellow card) 49'; Mikovič (yellow card) 63'; Augustini (yellow card) 90' | Stadium: Štadión FC ViOn; Attendance: 3,420; Referee: Dušan Sedlák; Assistant referees: Miroslav Benko, Marián Jankovič |

| 1 September 2013 8 | Slovan Bratislava | 2–0 | ViOn Zlaté Moravce | Bratislava |
| 17:30 CEST (UTC+2) | Milinković 32'; Fořt 41'; Kladrubský (yellow card) 50' | Report | Kuciak (yellow card) 27'; Mazan (yellow card) 65'; Chrappan (yellow card) 75' | Stadium: Pasienky; Attendance: 0 Referee: Štefan Lešk; Assistant referees: Tomáš Vorel, Michal Tomčík |

| 14 September 2013 9 | ViOn Zlaté Moravce | 2–2 | Senica | Zlaté Moravce |
| 17:30 CEST (UTC+2) | L. Szabó 57'; Orávik (yellow card) 78'; Bernáth 80' | Report | Piroska 32' (pen.); Diviš 75' | Stadium: Štadión FC ViOn; Attendance: 1,082; Referee: Štefan Leško; Assistant referees: Radomír Sluk, Peter Chládek |

| 17 September 2013 10 | Trenčín | 5–0 | ViOn Zlaté Moravce | Trenčín |
| 17:30 CEST (UTC+2) | Alves 12', 76'; Hajradinović 25'; Van Kessel 45'; Malec 68' | Report | | Stadium: Štadión na Sihoti; Attendance: 1,115; Referee: Ľubomír Samotný; Assistant referees: Tomáš Vorel, Gabriel Ádám |

| 20 September 2013 11 | ViOn Zlaté Moravce | 1–0 | Spartak Myjava | Zlaté Moravce |
| 17:30 CEST (UTC+2) | Pribula 25'; Candrák (yellow card) 65'; Mazan (yellow card) 79' | Report | Siva (yellow card) 57'; Černáček (yellow card) 59'; Šulek (yellow card) 89' | Stadium: Štadión FC ViOn; Attendance: 1,146; Referee: Gabriel Michlian; Assistant referees: Martin Balko, Rastislav Žákech |

| 28 September 2013 12 | ViOn Zlaté Moravce | 1–1 | Košice | Zlaté Moravce |
| 17:30 CEST (UTC+2) | Pavlenda (yellow card) 49'; Pintér (yellow card) 55', (goal) 64'; Bolinha (yellow card) 87'; Obročník (yellow card) 90' | Report | Šinglár (yellow card) 60'; Bukata 73'; Tofiloski (yellow card) 87' | Stadium: Štadión FC ViOn; Attendance: 1,240; Referee: Marek Mastiš; Assistant referees: Miroslav Benko, Marián Jankovič |

| 5 October 2013 13 | Ružomberok | 1–3 | ViOn Zlaté Moravce | Ružomberok |
| 14:30 CEST (UTC+2) | Tawamba 37'; Greššák (yellow card) 63' | Report | Obročník 18'; Babic 20'; Chrappan (yellow card) 42'; Orávik 45', (yellow card) 69'; L. Szabó (yellow card) 70' | Stadium: Štadión MFK Ružomberok; Attendance: 1,790; Referee: Michal Smolák; Assistant referees: Karol Poláček, Juraj Lieskovský |

| 19 October 2013 14 | ViOn Zlaté Moravce | 2–0 | Žilina | Zlaté Moravce |
| 17:30 CEST (UTC+2) | Pintér 29'; Mazan 60' | Report | Majtán (yellow card) 43'; Škvarka (yellow card) 57' | Stadium: Štadión FC ViOn; Attendance: 1,410; Referee: Mário Vlk; Assistant referees: Radomír Sluk, Gabriel Ádám |

| 26 October 2013 15 | ViOn Zlaté Moravce | 1–0 | DAC Dunajská Streda | Zlaté Moravce |
| 14:30 CEST (UTC+2) | Pintér 16'; P. Sabo (yellow card) 77' | Report | Gabriel (yellow card) 19' | Stadium: Štadión FC ViOn; Attendance: 982; Referee: Peter Kráľovič; Assistant referees: Marián Jankovič, Dušan Petríček |

| 2 November 2013 16 | Dukla Banská Bystrica | 2–1 | ViOn Zlaté Moravce | Banská Bystrica |
| 14:30 CET (UTC+1) | Marcin 43'; Jurčo 59'; Vajda (yellow card) 67' | Report | Pribula 62'; Bernáth (yellow card) 80'; Mazan (yellow card) 82' | Stadium: Štadión SNP; Attendance: 1,540; Referee: Martin Ježík; Assistant referees: Miroslav Benko, Gabriel Ádám |

| 9 November 2013 17 | ViOn Zlaté Moravce | 3–0 | Nitra | Zlaté Moravce |
| 14:30 CET (UTC+1) | Pintér 24'; Chren 60'; Pribula 78' | Report | Kemláge (yellow card) 12'; Kostelný (yellow card) 53' | Stadium: Štadión FC ViOn; Attendance: 1,040; Referee: Miroslav Fajčík; Assistant referees: Tomáš Mókoš, Peter Bóllo |

| 23 November 2013 18 | Spartak Trnava | 3–2 | ViOn Zlaté Moravce | Trnava |
| 13:00 CET (UTC+1) | E. Sabo 48', 53' (pen.); Vlasko 68' (pen.); Chovanec (yellow card) 71'; Procházka (yellow card) 80'; Banovič (yellow card) 83' | Report | Obročník (yellow card) 45', (goal) 84'; Mazan (yellow card) 62'; P. Sabo (yellow card) 67'; Kuciak (yellow card) 68'; Chrappan (yellow card) 74' (red card) 83'; Pribula 81' (pen.); Pavlenda (red card) 90' | Stadium: Anton Malatinský Stadium; Attendance: 2,627; Referee: Kamil Horváth; Assistant referees: Tomáš Somoláni, Dušan Kubačk |

| 30 November 2013 19 | ViOn Zlaté Moravce | 0–2 | Slovan Bratislava | Zlaté Moravce |
| 14:30 CET (UTC+1) | | Report | Niňaj 48'; Gorosito (yellow card) 67'; Halenár 88' | Stadium: Štadión FC ViOn; Attendance: 1,610; Referee: Roland Weiss; Assistant referees: Martin Balko, Radomír Sluk |

| 1 March 2014 20 | Senica | 2–1 | ViOn Zlaté Moravce | Senica |
| 14:00 CET (UTC+1) | Sosa 50'; Kalabiška 53'; Piroska (yellow card) 55' | Report | Chrappan (yellow card) 59'; Majerník (yellow card) 87'; Hadžić 90' | Stadium: Štadión FK Senica; Attendance: 1,728; Referee: Ľubomír Samotný; Assistant referees: Martin Balko, Dušan Kubačka |

| 8 March 2014 21 | Trenčín | 2–1 | ViOn Zlaté Moravce | Trenčín |
| 17:30 CET (UTC+1) | Malec 19'; Mišák 50'; Madu (yellow card) 55' (red card) 68' | Report | Pavelka (yellow card) 13', (goal) 64'; Chren (yellow card) 27'; Mazan (yellow card) 59'; Majerník (yellow card) 74'; Candrák (yellow card) 88' | Stadium: Štadión na Sihoti; Attendance: 2,931; Referee: Peter Kráľovič; Assistant referees: Roman Slyško, Marián Jankovič |

| 22 March 2014 23 | Košice | 0–0 | ViOn Zlaté Moravce | Košice |
| 13:30 CET (UTC+1) | Bašista (yellow card) 79' | Report | Bolinha (yellow card) 79'; Pavlenda (yellow card) 81' | Stadium: Štadión Lokomotívy v Čermeli; Attendance: 2,180; Referee: Ján Valášek; Assistant referees: Juraj Lieskovský, Martin Špivák |

| 29 March 2014 24 | ViOn Zlaté Moravce | 1–0 | Ružomberok | Zlaté Moravce |
| 17:30 CET (UTC+1) | Babic 46'; Chren (yellow card) 78' | Report | Adamović (yellow card) 13'; Greššák (yellow card) 45'; Zošák (yellow card) 85'; Tawamba (yellow card) 90' | Stadium: Štadión FC ViOn; Attendance: 1,864; Referee: Richard Trutz; Assistant referees: Henrich Mikulaj, Martin Borsányi |

| 1 April 2014 22 | Spartak Myjava | 0–0 | ViOn Zlaté Moravce | Myjava |
| 19:00 CEST (UTC+2) | Šulek (yellow card) 74' | Report | | Stadium: Stadium Myjava; Attendance: 1,137; Referee: Martin Ježík; Assistant referees: Miroslav Benko, Ondrej Brendza |

| 7 April 2014 25 | Žilina | 1–0 | ViOn Zlaté Moravce | Žilina |
| 18:30 CEST (UTC+2) | Mihalík 37'; Káčer (yellow card) 78' | Report | Charizopulos (yellow card) 26'; Pintér (yellow card) 78' | Stadium: Štadión pod Dubňom; Attendance: 2,355; Referee: Michal Smolák; Assistant referees: Martin Balko, Peter Jenčura |

| 12 April 2014 26 | DAC Dunajská Streda | 1–0 | ViOn Zlaté Moravce | Dunajská Streda |
| 19:00 CEST (UTC+2) | O. Szabó 8' (pen.); Čaušić (yellow card) 16'; Nurković (yellow card) 19'; Krišto (yellow card) 66' | Report | Pavlenda (yellow card) 7' | Stadium: DAC Stadion; Attendance: 4,518; Referee: Dušan Sedlák; Assistant referees: Miroslav Benko, Radoslav Bobko |

| 20 April 2014 27 | ViOn Zlaté Moravce | 1–3 | Dukla Banská Bystrica | Zlaté Moravce |
| 18:30 CEST (UTC+2) | Bolinha (yellow card) 41'; Majerník (yellow card) 46'; L. Szabó 71' | Report | Chrien 6', 51'; Nosko (yellow card) 17'; Ľupták (yellow card) 64', (goal) 78' | Stadium: Štadión FC ViOn; Attendance: 2,012; Referee: Miroslav Jaška; Assistant referees: Mário Roszbeck, Dušan Kubačka |

| 26 April 2014 28 | Nitra | 0–3 | ViOn Zlaté Moravce | Nitra |
| 19:30 CEST (UTC+2) | Špalek (yellow card) 21'; Böhm (yellow card) 30'; Kostelný (yellow card) 44'; Kolbas (yellow card) 47' (red card) 58'; Mikuš (yellow card) 54' | Report | Charizopulos (yellow card) 4' (red card) 70'; Chrappan (yellow card) 6'; L. Szabó 9'; Mazan (yellow card) 42'; Pavlenda (yellow card) 67'; Babic (yellow card) 77'; Orávik 85', 90' | Stadium: Štadión pod Zoborom; Attendance: 890; Referee: Štefan Leško; Assistant referees: Tomáš Vorel, Karol Poláček |

| 3 May 2014 29 | ViOn Zlaté Moravce | 1–2 | Spartak Trnava | Zlaté Moravce |
| 15:00 CEST (UTC+2) | Orávik (yellow card) 41', (goal) 88'; Pintér (yellow card) 76'; Babic (yellow card) 80'; Bolinha (yellow card) 80' | Report | E. Sabo 57' (pen.); Vyskočil 83' | Stadium: Štadión FC ViOn; Attendance: 3,168; Referee: Ľubomír Samotný; Assistant referees: Roman Slyško, Marián Jankovič |

| 10 May 2014 30 | Slovan Bratislava | 2–0 | ViOn Zlaté Moravce | Bratislava |
| 17:30 CEST (UTC+2) | Bagi (yellow card) 42'; Milinković (yellow card) 54', (goal) 60'; Peltier (yellow card) 77'; Hlohovský 85' | Report | Pintér (yellow card) 18'; Orávik (yellow card) 81' | Stadium: Pasienky; Attendance: 1,255; Referee: Gabriel Michlian; Assistant referees: Radoslav Bobko, Peter Jenčura |

| 17 May 2014 31 | ViOn Zlaté Moravce | 2–1 | Senica | Zlaté Moravce |
| 17:30 CEST (UTC+2) | L. Szabó 58'; Chrappan (yellow card) 63', (goal) 86'; L. Kováč (yellow card) 72' | Report | Kalabiška (yellow card) 78' | Stadium: Štadión FC ViOn; Attendance: 943; Referee: Marek Mastiš; Assistant referees: Ondrej Brendza, Martin Borsányi |

| 20 May 2014 32 | ViOn Zlaté Moravce | 1–3 | Trenčín | Zlaté Moravce |
| 17:30 CEST (UTC+2) | Pribula 15' | Report | Mišák 52'; Simon 54'; Bero (yellow card) 59'; Van Kessel (yellow card) 61'; Malec 88' | Stadium: Štadión FC ViOn; Attendance: 1,046; Referee: Ladislav Prešinský; Assistant referees: Michal Tomčík, František Ferenc |

| 31 May 2014 33 | ViOn Zlaté Moravce | 1–2 | Spartak Myjava | Zlaté Moravce |
| 17:30 CEST (UTC+2) | Charizopulos 52' | Report | D. Duga 13'; Urgela 38'; Beňo (yellow card) 73' | Stadium: Štadión FC ViOn; Attendance: 1,020; Referee: Filip Glova; Assistant referees: Roman Slyško, Peter Bednár |

=== Slovak Cup ===
| 28 August 2013 Second round | Petržalka | 2–4 | ViOn Zlaté Moravce | Petržalka |
| 17:00 CEST (UTC+2) | Vuković 14'; Klenovský (yellow card) 34'; Tomšík (yellow card) 61'; Kolony 67' | Report | Pribula 26', 75'; Candrák (yellow card) 33'; Orávik 76', 86'; Mihálik (yellow card) 83' | Stadium: Stadium FC Petržalka 1898; Attendance: 390; Referee: Anton Jánoš; Assistant referees: Dušan Hrčka, Dušan Kubačka |

| 24 September 2013 Third round | ViOn Zlaté Moravce | 3–2 | Slovan Duslo Šaľa | Zlaté Moravce |
| 16:00 CEST (UTC+2) | Pribula 25', 44'; Orávik 59'; Mihálik (yellow card) 90' | Report | Kráľ (yellow card) 29'; Numéric 73'; Mihálik (yellow card) 79'; Konopásek 82'; Čurgali (yellow card) 90' | Stadium: Štadión FC ViOn; Attendance: 560; Referee: Richard Trutz; Assistant referees: Tomáš Mókoš, Henrich Mikulaj |

| 23 October 2013 Quarter-finals First leg | Senica | 3–0; Awarded | ViOn Zlaté Moravce | Senica |
| 17:30 CEST (UTC+2) | Kóňa (yellow card) 68'; Diarrassouba 70'; Brabec (yellow card) 82' | Report | Pintér (yellow card) 11'; Mazan 33'; P. Sabo (yellow card) 43'; L. Szabó 59' | Stadium: Štadión FK Senica; Attendance: 822; Referee: Miroslav Jaška; Assistant referees: Peter Chládek, Peter Bednár; Fourth official: Vladimír Hracho |

| 5 November 2013 Quarter-finals Second leg | ViOn Zlaté Moravce | 0–1 (0–4 agg.) | Senica | Zlaté Moravce |
| 16:30 CEST (UTC+2) | Obročník (yellow card) 19'; Bolinha (yellow card) 78'; Chrappan (yellow card) 86' | Report | Tsoumou (yellow card) 23'; Piroska (yellow card) 27'; Jirásek (yellow card) 71'; Pavlík (yellow card) 86'; Ventúra 90' | Stadium: Štadión FC ViOn; Attendance: 500; Referee: Gabriel Michlian; Assistant referees: Dušan Hrčka, Martin Vindiš; Fourth official: Roman Matúš |
Note: Senica won 4–0 on aggregate.
