= 2007 Slovak Cup final =

- Event: 2006–07 Slovak Cup
FC Senec	FC ViOn Zlaté Moravce
0	4
- Date: 8 May 2007
- Venue: Pasienky, Bratislava
- Referee: Vladimír Hriňák
- Attendance: 3,119

The 2007 Slovak Cup final was the final match of the 2006–07 Slovak Cup, the 38th season of the top cup competition in Slovak football. The match was played at the Pasienky in Bratislava on 8 May 2007 between FC Senec and FC ViOn Zlaté Moravce. FC ViOn defeated Senec 4-0.

== Route to the final ==
FC Senec		Round	FC ViOn Zlaté Moravce
Opponent	Result	2006–07 Slovak Cup	Opponent	Result
Spartak Trnava "B"	1-0 home	Second Round	AS Trenčín	0-0 (6:5 pen.) away
Tatran Prešov	1-1 (4:3 pen.) home	Third Round	Slovan Bratislava "B"	4-1 home
ŠK Eldus Močenok	2–2 (7:6 pen.) away	Quarter-finals	FC Nitra	1-0 home
MFK Ružomberok "B"	0–0 away, 0-0 (6:5 pen.) home	Semi-finals	Artmedia Bratislava	0–1 away, 4-2 home

== Match ==
=== Details ===
8 May 2007
17:00 CEST

FC Senec	0–4	Zlaté Moravce
	Report	Choma 39', 43'; Černák 88'; Plichta 90+'

Pasienky, Bratislava
Attendance: 3,112
Referee: Vladimír Hriňák

FC Senec	FC ViOn Zlaté Moravce

FC SENEC:
GK		(Slovakia) Ján Novota
RB		(Slovakia) Ján Papaj
CB	6	(Slovakia) Csaba Gábriš		(substituted off) 46'
CB	4	(Slovakia) Ľubomír Guldan (c)
LB		(Slovakia) Ivan Pecha
MF		(Slovakia) Stanislav Angelovič
MF		(Slovakia) Matej Kováč
MF		(Slovakia) Radoslav Augustín		(substituted off) 82'
MF		(Slovakia) Vladimír Rožník	(yellow card) 47'	(substituted off) 74'
AM		(France) Youssef Moughfire
FW		(Slovakia) Tomáš Kozár
Substitutions:
DF		(Slovakia) Tomáš Ekhardt		(substituted on) 46'
ST		(Slovakia) Jozef Bozsík		(substituted on) 82'
MF		(Slovakia) Branislav Hulák		(substituted on) 74'
Manager:
Jozef Valovič

FC VION ZLATÉ MORAVCE:
GK		(Slovakia) Michal Peškovič
RB	5	(Slovakia) Patrik Pavlenda
CB		(Czech Republic) Jiří Klabal
CB		(Slovakia) Roman Greguška
LB		(Slovakia) Maroš Choma	(substituted off) 90'
DM		(Slovakia) Ján Hözl
MF		(Slovakia) Martin Ondrejka	(yellow card) 75'
MF	7	(Slovakia) Peter Černák (c)
MF		(Slovakia) Peter Kuračka
MF		(Slovakia) Ondrej Číž	(substituted off) 85'
FW		(Slovakia) Martin Chren	(substituted off) 84'
Substitutions:
DF		(Slovakia) Andrej Medera	(substituted on) 90'
FW		(Slovakia) Marek Plichta	(substituted on) 84'
FW		(Slovakia) Ján Juska	(substituted on) 85'
Manager:
Ján Rosinský

Assistant referees:
(Slovakia) Emanuel Cuninka
(Slovakia) Vladimír Medveď
