= 2006–07 Slovak Cup =

Tournament details
- Country: Slovakia
- Teams: 54

Final positions
- Champions: ViOn Zlaté Moravce
- Runners-up: Senec

The 2006–07 Slovak Cup was the 38th season of Slovakia's annual knock-out cup competition and the fourteenth since the independence of Slovakia. It began on 1 August 2006 with the matches of first round and ended on 8 May 2007 with the final. The winners of the competition earned a place in the first qualifying round of the UEFA Cup. MFK Ružomberok were the defending champions.

== First round ==
The two games were played on 1 August 2006.

Team 1	Score	Team 2
FK Rača	1–1 (2–4 p)	Slovan Bratislava II
FKS Nemšová	2–1	MFK Vrbové
Spartak Trnava II	3–0	ŠKP Dúbravka Bratislava
ŠK VEGUM Dolné Vestenice	1–2	ŠK Eldus Močenok
AFC Nové Mesto nad Váhom	1–2	SFM Senec
Spartak Vráble	2–2 (3–0 p)	Artmedia Bratislava II
Slovan Duslo Šaľa	5–2	DAC 1904 Dunajská Streda
Matador Púchov	0–0 (5–4 p)	FC Nitra II
ŽP ŠPORT Podbrezová II	0–1	Tatran NAO Liptovský Mikuláš
FK Čadca	4–2	ŠK Odeva Lipany
FK Žiar nad Hronom	1–3	MFK Stará Ľubovňa
TJ Cementár Turňa nad Bodvou	1–1 (4–5 p)	MFK Ružomberok II
MFK Dolný Kubín	1–0	ŽP ŠPORT Podbrezová
FK Spišská Nová Ves	0–0 (4–2 p)	LAFC Lučenec
MFK Zemplín Michalovce	2–1	HFC Humenné
Rimavská Sobota	2–0	MFK Košice II
Tatran Prešov	3–0	MŠK Tesla Stropkov
ŠK Aqua Turčianske Teplice	2–2 (7–6 p)	MFK Vranov nad Topľou
Dukla Banská Bystrica II	1–1 (6–5 p)	FK Slavoj Trebišov

== Second round ==
The two games were played on 5 September 2006, the twelve games on 12 and 13 September 2006 and the two games were played on 10 October 2006.

Team 1	Score	Team 2
MFK Ružomberok II	0–0 (6–5 p)	Tatran NAO Liptovský Mikuláš
AS Trenčín	0–0 (5–6 p)	FC ViOn Zlaté Moravce
Matador Púchov	0–3	FC Nitra
Rimavská Sobota	4–1	MFK Košice
Dukla Banská Bystrica	5–0	Dukla Banská Bystrica II
Slovan Bratislava II	2–0	Slovan Bratislava
FK Čadca	0–3	MŠK Žilina
FC Senec	1–0	Spartak Trnava II
MFK Stará Ľubovňa	0–0 (2–3 p)	Tatran Prešov
ŠK Aqua Turčianske Teplice	2–2 (4–5 p)	Inter Bratislava
Spartak Vráble	1–1 (2–4 p)	Spartak Trnava
FKS Nemšová	1–0	ZTS Dubnica
ŠK Eldus Močenok	4–0	SFM Senec
MFK Dolný Kubín	0–1	MFK Zemplín Michalovce
Slovan Duslo Šaľa	0–1	Artmedia Bratislava
FK Spišská Nová Ves	1–0	MFK Ružomberok

== Third round ==
The seven games were played on 24 and 25 October 2006 and the match Artmedia Bratislava – Rimavská Sobota was played on 7 November 2006.

Team 1	Score	Team 2
FC Nitra	0–0 (3–1 p)	FK Spišská Nová Ves
FC Senec	0–0 (4–3 p)	Tatran Prešov
Inter Bratislava	0–2	MŠK Žilina
MFK Zemplín Michalovce	0–2	Dukla Banská Bystrica
ŠK Eldus Močenok	2–1	FKS Nemšová
MFK Ružomberok II	1–1 (2–0 p)	Spartak Trnava
FC ViOn Zlaté Moravce	4–1	Slovan Bratislava II
Artmedia Bratislava	3–0	Rimavská Sobota

== Quarter-finals ==
The match Artmedia Bratislava – MŠK Žilina was played on 3 April 2007 and the three games were played on 4 April 2007.

3 April 2007	Artmedia Petržalka	3–0	MŠK Žilina	Bratislava
15:30	Oravec 32'; Fodrek 41', 57' (pen.)	Report		Stadium: Štadión Petržalka; Attendance: 1,850; Referee: Jozef Kačenga

4 April 2007	MFK Ružomberok II	2–1	Dukla Banská Bystrica	Ružomberok
15:30	M. Bakoš 10'; Chovanec 16'	Report	Seman 84'	Stadium: Štadión pod Čebraťom; Attendance: 2,255; Referee: Michal Smolák

4 April 2007	Zlaté Moravce	1–0	FC Nitra	Zlaté Moravce
15:30	Choma 79'	Report		Stadium: Štadión FC ViOn; Attendance: 1,465; Referee: Mário Vlk

4 April 2007	Eldus Močenok	2–2 (6−7 p)	FC Senec	Močenok
15:30	J. Chovanec 59'; Pavlovič 72' (pen.)	Report	Takáč 58', 90+'	Stadium: Štadión ŠK Eldus Močenok; Attendance: 500; Referee: Ľuboš Micheľ
	Penalties
	Čambal (penalty scored); Hrnčár (penalty scored); Ďurica (penalty scored); Bernáth (penalty missed); Paulík (penalty scored); Dojčan (penalty scored); Palic (penalty scored); Uzola (penalty missed)		(penalty missed) Takáč; (penalty scored) Moughfire; (penalty scored) Augustín; (penalty scored) Guldan; (penalty scored) Kozár; (penalty scored) Kováč; (penalty scored) Novák; (penalty scored) Novota

== Semi-finals ==
The first legs were played on 17 April 2007. The second legs were played on 25 April 2007.

=== First legs ===
17 April 2007	MFK Ružomberok II	0–0	FC Senec	Ružomberok
16:00		Report		Stadium: Štadión pod Čebraťom; Attendance: 2,057; Referee: Michal Smolák

17 April 2007	Artmedia Petržalka	1–0	Zlaté Moravce	Bratislava
16:00	Halenár 49'	Report		Stadium: Štadión Petržalka; Attendance: 1,080; Referee: Ľubomír Samotný

=== Second legs ===
25 April 2007	FC Senec	0–0 (0–0 agg.) (6−5 p)	MFK Ružomberok II	Senec
16:00		Report		Stadium: NTC Senec; Attendance: 5,780; Referee: Jozef Pavlík
	Penalties
	Moughfire (penalty missed); Takáč (penalty scored); Guldan (penalty scored); Rožník (penalty scored); Kozár (penalty scored); Kováč (penalty scored); Novota (penalty scored)		(penalty scored) Ďubek; (penalty scored) Chovanec; (penalty scored) Kucka; (penalty scored) Majný; (penalty missed) Paluba; (penalty scored) L. Bakoš; (penalty missed) Maslo

25 April 2007	Zlaté Moravce	4–2 (4–3 agg.)	Artmedia Petržalka	Zlaté Moravce
16:30	Chren 13'; Hözl 45'; Plichta 65'; Choma 74'	Report	Čišovský 5'; Choma 33' (o.g.)	Stadium: Štadión FC ViOn; Attendance: 2,040; Referee: Patrik Hrčka

== Final ==
8 May 2007
17:00 CEST

FC Senec	0–4	Zlaté Moravce
	Report	Choma 39', 43'; Černák 88'; Plichta 90+'

Pasienky, Bratislava
Attendance: 3,112
Referee: Vladimír Hriňák
