= Lukáš Mihálik (footballer, born 1994) =

Slovak footballer (born 1994)

Personal information
- Full name: Lukáš Mihálik
- Date of birth: 12 February 1994 (age 32)
- Place of birth: Slovakia
- Position: Forward

Team information
- Current team: FC Jois
- Number: 10

Youth career
- –2011: Zlaté Moravce

Senior career*
Years	Team	Apps	(Gls)
2012–2014	Zlaté Moravce	20	(1)
2014	→ Spartak Vrable		
2015–2016	SG Neudorf/Parndorf		
2016	Sportunion Aschbach		
2016–2018	Devínska Nová Ves		
2019	FC Hollenstein		
2020–	FC Jois		
- * Club domestic league appearances and goals as of 3 January 2014

Lukáš Mihálik (born 12 February 1994) is a Slovak football forward who currently plays for FC Jois in Austria. He is most known for playing as a centre-forward for first division side FC ViOn Zlaté Moravce, staying with the club for 2 seasons.

== Club career ==
=== Zlaté Moravce ===
After good performances in the youth team, Mihálik asked for a place in the A - team of Zlaté Moravce, with whom he has been training with almost a month.

The 18-year old Mihálik made his senior debut for FC ViOn Zlaté Moravce in a 5–0 away win against Spartak Trnava. Coming onto the game as a substitute in the 79th minute for Adrián Candrák, Mihálik would score his first goal for the club just 10 minutes later, scoring a header after a cross from Peter Orávik.

==== 2013–2014 season ====
Mihálik played his first match in the 2013–2014 season for Zlaté Moravce in a 2–0 loss against FC VSS Košice on 13 July 2013, coming off the bench in the 84th minute for Juraj Pilát. His first start came in the same season, starting in a 3–2 win against FC Nitra. Mihálik would also start in a 2–0 win against Spartak Trnava.

On 24 October 2013, Members of the Sports and Technical Commission of the Slovak Football Association decided to annul the result of the quarter-final match of the Slovak Cup between FK Senica and FC ViOn Zlaté Moravce due to an unauthorized start by the visiting player Lukáš Mihálik, with a result of 3–0 in favor of the home team. The 19-year-old ViOn striker received a yellow card each time in the victories in the 2nd round over FC Petržalka as well as in the 3rd round Dusl Šaľa and since Mihálik collected two, he could not intervene in the quarter-final match in Senica. However, Mihálik replaced Lukáš Szabó on the field in the 83rd minute and played the rest of the match.
