= Mihalik =

Mihalik, Mihálik is a gender-neutral Slavic surname meaning Michael or Michal that may refer to

- Brian Mihalik (born 1992), American football offensive tackle
- Cora-Ann Mihalik (born c. 1954), American television news anchor and reporter
- Emil John Mihalik (1920–1984), American Catholic bishops
- Enikő Mihalik (born 1987), Hungarian model
- George Mihalik (born 1952), American football coach and former player
- Jaroslav Mihalík (born 1994), Slovak football winger
- Kálmán Mihalik (1896–1922), Hungarian physician and composer
- Lukáš Mihálik (footballer, born 1994), Slovak football forward
- Lukáš Mihálik (footballer, born 1997), Slovak football midfielder
- Ondřej Mihálik (born 1997), Czech football striker
- Pavol Mihalik, Slovak ice hockey player
- Peter Mihálik
- Red Mihalik (1916–1996), American basketball player and referee of Polish descent
- Roman Mihálik (born 1988), Slovak football defender
- Vladimír Mihálik (born 1987), Slovak ice hockey defenceman
