= Jozef Novota =

Slovak footballer (born 1986)

Personal information
- Full name: Jozef Novota
- Date of birth: 24 January 1986 (age 40)
- Place of birth: Zlaté Moravce, Czechoslovakia
- Height: 1.82 m (6 ft 0 in)
- Position: Goalkeeper

Team information
- Current team: Zlaté Moravce (Head of Academy coaching)

Youth career
- Zlaté Moravce

Senior career*
Years	Team	Apps	(Gls)
–2002	Zlaté Moravce		
2002–2005	FC Nitra		
2005–2013	Zlaté Moravce		
2011–2012	→ OFK Sľažany (loan)		
2012–2013	→ Palárikovo (loan)		
2013	OFK Sľažany		
2014–2016	→ Zlaté Moravce	7	(0)

Managerial career
- 2020–2023: Zlaté Moravce (assistant)
- * Club domestic league appearances and goals as of 31 December 2025

Jozef Novota (born 24 January 1986) is a former Slovak football goalkeeper who is most known for playing with Fortuna Liga club FC ViOn Zlaté Moravce. He is currently the Head of Academy coaching at the club since 2018.

== Club career ==
=== FC ViOn Zlaté Moravce ===
Novota made his professional debut for FC ViOn Zlaté Moravce against FC Spartak Trnava on 13 July 2014, coming on off the bench in the 35th minute following the sending off of Pavel Kováč. Novota’s only other appearances that season would be in a 1–1 draw with MFK Ružomberok, where he would win the man of the match award, and a 3–1 loss against AS Trenčín. After retiring from professional football in 2017, Novota devoted himself to kickboxing, where had a sharp competitive debut at the Slovak Championships in Košice, facing multiple world champion Pavol Garaj.

=== After professional football ===
After the signing of Ján Kocian as new manager of Zlaté Moravce, it was announced that Novota would be the new assistant manager. He has already held that position temporarily once, when he assisted coach Ľuboš Benkovský the previous year. Novota held the position of assistant manager until 2023. In 2023, he signed three hundred youth players for Zlaté Moravce, one hundred in Vrábľy and up to twenty-two team categories in the fourteenth season of existence, the most youth players the club had ever had.
