= Ján Rosinský =

Slovak football manager

Personal information
- Full name: Ján Rosinský
- Date of birth: 23 May 1952 (age 74)
- Place of birth: Choča, Czechoslovakia
- Position: Defender

Youth career
- –1967: TJ Choča
- 1967–1971: Nitra

Senior career*
Years	Team	Apps	(Gls)
1971–1975	Nitra	70	(0)
1975–1978	Internacionál Slovnaft Bratislava	?	(?)
1979–1982	Calex Zlaté Moravce	?	(?)

International career
- Czechoslovakia U23

Managerial career
- Calex Zlaté Moravce
- –1992: Czechoslovakia (Assistant)
- –1994: Nitra
- 1994–1995: Vráble
- 1995–1996: Baník Prievidza
- 1996–1997: Slovan Duslo Šaľa
- 1997–1998: Slovmag Jelšava
- 1998–1999: Slovan Levice
- 1999–2001: Senica
- 2001–2003: Island FC
- 2003–2005: Slovan Duslo Šaľa
- 2005–2008: ViOn Zlaté Moravce
- 2008–2009: Žiar nad Hronom
- 2010–2012: ViOn Zlaté Moravce (Assistant)
- 2012–2013: Slovakia U19 (Team leader)
- 2019: Pohronie
- * Club domestic league appearances and goals

Ján Rosinský (born 23 May 1952) is a former Slovak football player and a manager.

== Career ==
Rosinský began his career in his native village of Choča, before moving to top Czechoslovak club AC Nitra. After 4 years in Nitra's first team, in 1975, he joined Internacionál Slovnaft Bratislava, also known as ČH Bratislava, who were a military club. He was forced to retire from professional football early, at the age of 26, after a knee injury. Nonetheless, Rosinský continued to play for amateur Calex Zlaté Moravce, before managing the side. From there, he moved to Nitra and also enjoyed a spell as one of the members technical staff of Czechoslovakia. He spent most of the next 10 years managing various teams in lower Slovak divisions.

He notably managed ViOn Zlaté Moravce in early 2000s, winning the 2006–07 Slovak Cup and winning the club's first promotion to the top division. As the cup winners, Rosinský's ViOn defeated Alma-Ata in the first qualifying round of the 2007–08 UEFA Cup, but were subsequently knocked out by later winners of Zenit St. Petersburg.

He made one managerial career stop in Maldives, where he coached Island FC. On two occasions, he also coached Žiar nad Hronom-based clubs: FK Žiar nad Hronom and successor club FK Pohronie. While his first spell was abruptly halted due to 2009 economic crisis and club's bankruptcy (despite topping the table in 3. Liga, his second spell with the latter club ended prematurely due to dissatisfactory results in the Fortuna Liga.

Rosinský is also known as a pedagogue of football managers and dedicated lot of his later career with working with young footballers.
