= Martin Chren =

Martin Chren may refer to:

- Martin Chren (cyclist) (born 1999), Slovak cyclist
- Martin Chren (footballer) (born 1984), Slovak footballer
