= Lukáš Mihálik =

Lukáš Mihálik may refer to:

- Lukáš Mihálik (footballer, born 1994), Slovak footballer for FC ViOn Zlaté Moravce
- Lukáš Mihálik (footballer, born 1997), Slovak footballer for Spartak Trnava
