= Michal Pintér =

Slovak footballer

Personal information
- Full name: Michal Pintér
- Date of birth: 4 February 1994 (age 32)
- Place of birth: Zlaté Moravce, Slovakia
- Height: 1.82 m (6 ft 0 in)
- Position: Centre back

Team information
- Current team: Vardar
- Number: 42

Youth career
- 2004–2011: ViOn Zlaté Moravce

Senior career*
| Years | Team | Apps | (Gls) |
| 2011–2021 | ViOn Zlaté Moravce | 143 | (8) |
| 2021 | Tatran Liptovský Mikuláš | 10 | (0) |
| 2022–2023 | ViOn Zlaté Moravce | 26 | (2) |
| 2023–2024 | Shkupi | 39 | (1) |
| 2025– | Vardar | 5 | (0) |

International career
| 2011 | Slovakia U18 | | |
| 2012–2013 | Slovakia U19 | 4 | (0) |
| 2014 | Slovakia U21 | 1 | (0) |
- * Club domestic league appearances and goals as of 1 June 2025

Michal Pintér (born 4 February 1994) is a Slovak professional footballer who currently plays for the Macedonian First Football League club FK Vardar.

== ViOn Zlaté Moravce ==
He made his debut for ViOn Zlaté Moravce against Košice on 25 October 2011.
