= Chren =

Chren is a Slovak surname literally meaning "horseradish". The Czech couterpart is Křen.

- Martin Chren (cyclist) (born 1999), Slovak cyclist
- Martin Chren (footballer) (born 1984), Slovak footballer
