= Velké Přílepy =

- Municipality
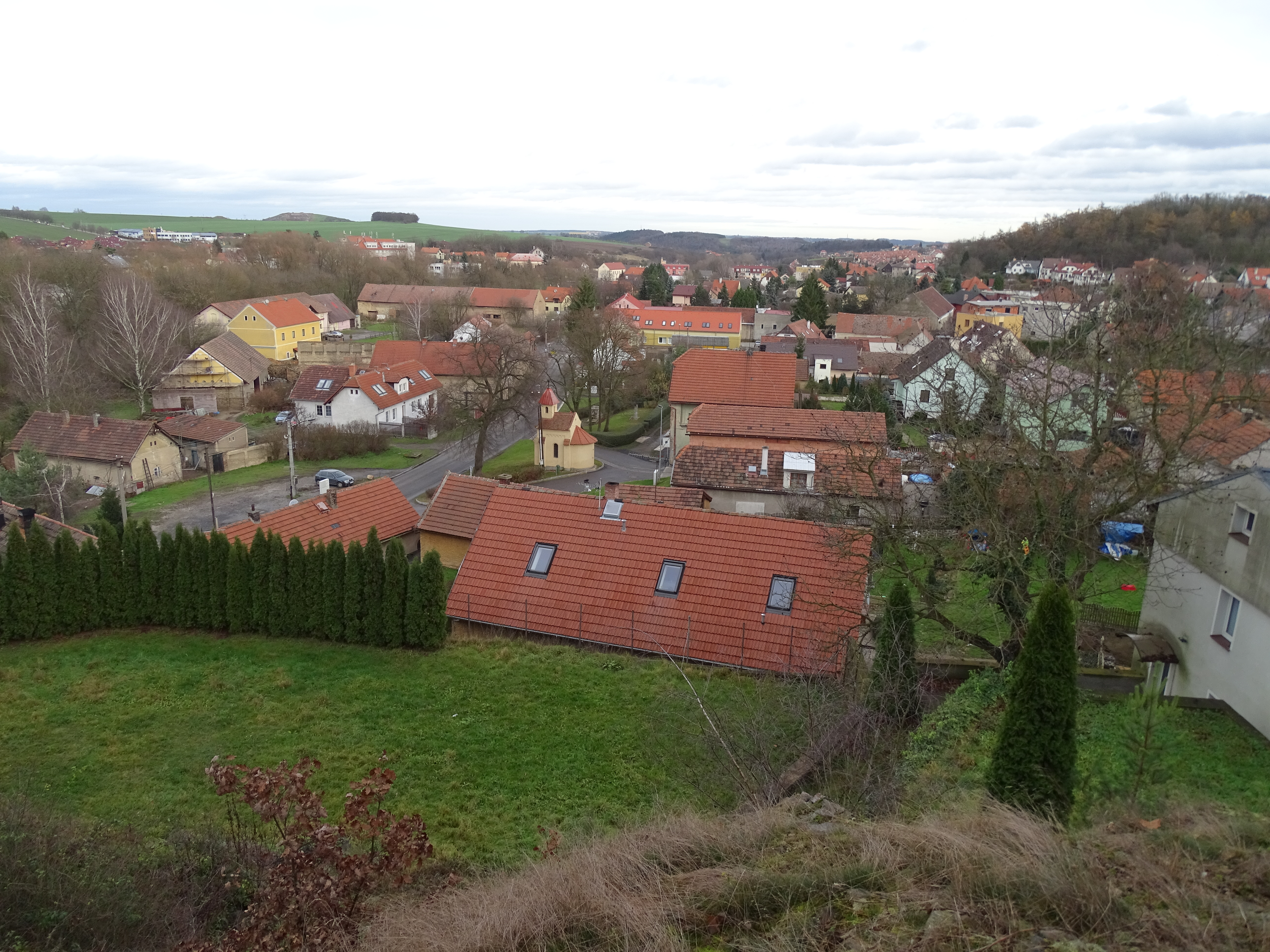
- General view

- Flag Coat of arms

- Location in the Czech Republic
- Coordinates: 50°9′38″N 14°18′52″E
- Country: Czech Republic
- Region: Central Bohemian
- District: Prague-West
- First mentioned: 1228

Area
  - Total: 5.68 km^{2} (2.19 sq mi)
- Elevation: 275 m (902 ft)

Population (2026-01-01)
  - Total: 3,598
  - Density: 633/km^{2} (1,640/sq mi)
- Time zone: UTC+1 (CET)
  - Summer (DST): UTC+2 (CEST)
- Postal code: 252 64
- Website: www.velke-prilepy.cz

Velké Přílepy (Czech pronunciation: [ˈvɛlkɛː ˈpr̝̊iːlɛpɪ]) is a municipality and village in Prague-West District in the Central Bohemian Region of the Czech Republic. It has about 3,600 inhabitants.

== Etymology ==
The name Přílepy is derived from the personal name Přílep, meaning "the village of Příleps (Přílep family)". The prefix velké ('great') was added to distinguish it from the nearby village of the same name (today known as Malé Přílepy, a part of Chyňava).

== Geography ==
Velké Přílepy is located about 7 kilometres (4 mi) north of Prague. It lies in a flat agricultural landscape in the Prague Plateau. The highest point is at 337 m (1,106 ft) above sea level.

== History ==
The first written mention of Velké Přílepy is from 1228. The village was divided into two parts, one was owned by the Metropolitan Chapter at Saint Vitus in Prague and one by the St. George's Convent in Prague. In 1436, during the Hussite Wars, both parts were acquired by the royal chamber and King Sigismund gave them to the nobility. However, both parts were bought by the Metropolitan Chapter at Saint Vitus in the first half of the 16th century. The chapter owned the village until 1848 with a short break in 1620–1623.

== Demographics ==
Historical population

Year	Pop.	±%
1869	564	—
1880	643	+14.0%
1890	644	+0.2%
1900	710	+10.2%
1910	702	−1.1%

Year	Pop.	±%
1921	692	−1.4%
1930	815	+17.8%
1950	623	−23.6%
1961	659	+5.8%
1970	675	+2.4%

Year	Pop.	±%
1980	810	+20.0%
1991	851	+5.1%
2001	948	+11.4%
2011	3,313	+249.5%
2021	3,821	+15.3%

Source: Censuses

== Economy ==
In Velké Přílepy is a detention prison with medium and high security, a branch of the detention prison in Prague-Ruzyně.

== Transport ==
There are no railways or major roads passing through the municipality.

== Sights ==
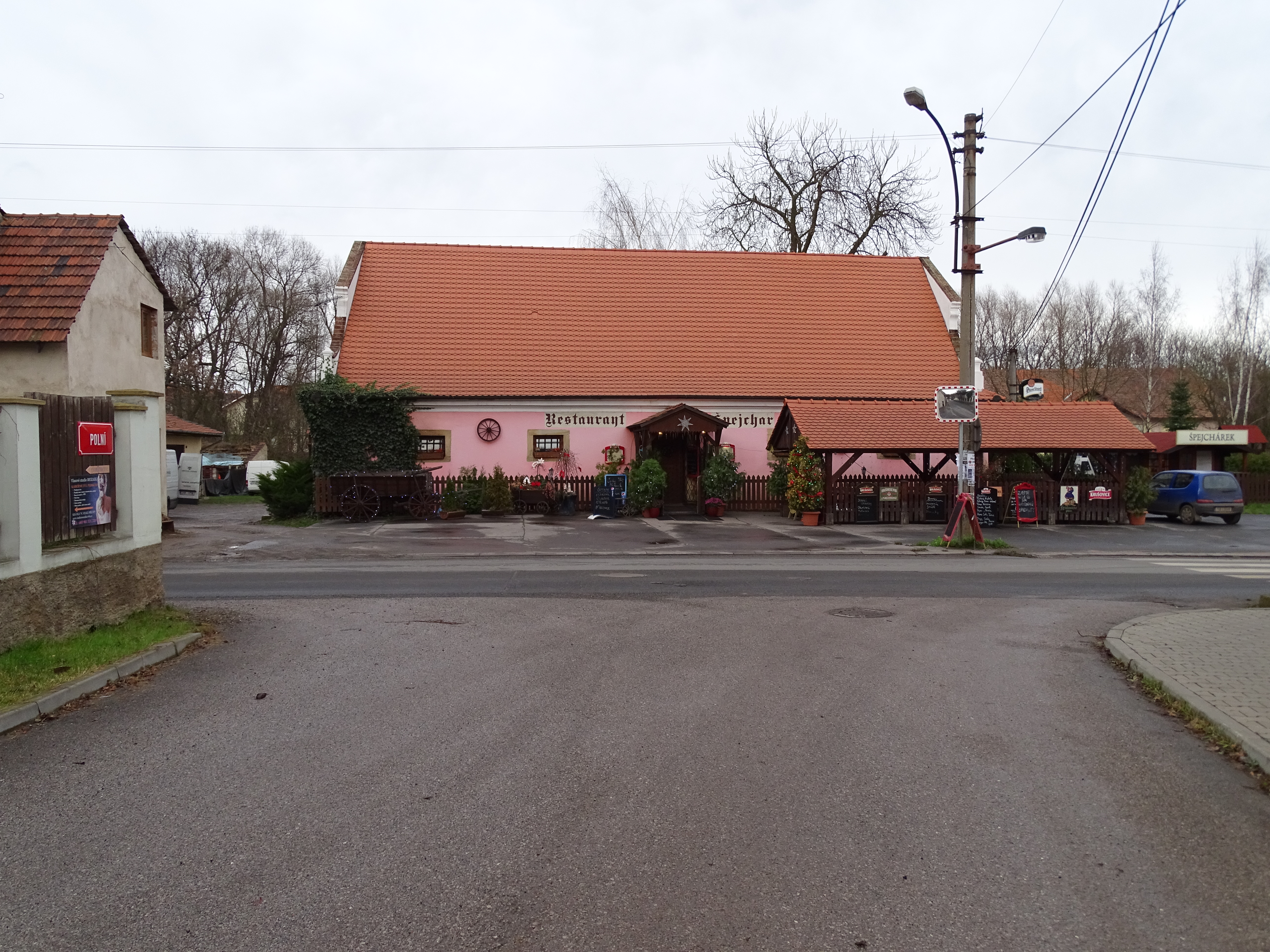
Baroque granary, now a restaurant

Almost no original vernacular architecture has been preserved. The most notable building is a Baroque granary, important from an architectural and urban point of view. Today it houses a restaurant.

Among the other protected monuments are the two chapels. The Chapel of the Virgin Mary is a Baroque building that dates from the first half of the 18th century. The Chapel of Saint Gotthard was built in the Neo-Romanesque style in 1880, when it replaced an older Baroque chapel.

== Twin towns – sister cities ==
Velké Přílepy is twinned with:

- Zlaté Moravce, Slovakia
