= Martin Ondrejka =

Slovak footballer

Personal information
- Full name: Martin Ondrejka
- Date of birth: 8 January 1983 (age 43)
- Place of birth: Zlaté Moravce, Czechoslovakia
- Height: 1.80 m (5 ft 11 in)
- Position: Midfielder

Team information
- Current team: Zlaté Moravce
- Number: 8

Youth career
- 1995–1997: ViOn Zlaté Moravce
- 1997–1999: FK Machulince
- 1999–2000: TJ Calex Zlaté Moravce
- 2000–2002: Slovan Bratislava

Senior career*
Years	Team	Apps	(Gls)
2002–	ViOn Zlaté Moravce	62	(0)
- * Club domestic league appearances and goals as of 26 May 2013

Martin Ondrejka (born 8 January 1983) is a Slovak footballer who currently plays for the Slovak Corgoň Liga club FC ViOn.
