= Róbert Vaniš =

Slovak footballer

Personal information
- Full name: Róbert Vaniš
- Date of birth: 29 September 1992 (age 34)
- Place of birth: Malacky, Czechoslovakia
- Height: 1.75 m (5 ft 9 in)
- Position: Winger

Team information
- Current team: SC Muckendorf

Youth career
- ŠK Malacky
- Slovan Bratislava

Senior career*
Years	Team	Apps	(Gls)
2012–2014	Slovan Bratislava	1	(0)
2013	→ Zlaté Moravce (loan)	6	(0)
2014	→ ATSV Ober-Grafendorf (loan)	15	(3)
2014	Ružomberok	3	(0)
2015–2017	Rohožník		
2017–	SC Muckendorf		

International career
- Slovakia U19
- * Club domestic league appearances and goals as of 14 June 2015

Róbert Vaniš (born 29 September 1992) is a Slovak football midfielder who plays for Austrian club SC Muckendorf.
