= Patrik Sabo =

Slovak footballer

Personal information
- Date of birth: 9 March 1993 (age 33)
- Place of birth: Bratislava, Slovakia
- Height: 1.76 m (5 ft 9 in)
- Position: Midfielder

Team information
- Current team: FC Andau

Youth career
- Inter Bratislava
- 2009–2012: Slovan Bratislava

Senior career*
Years	Team	Apps	(Gls)
2012–2015	Slovan Bratislava	4	(0)
2013	→ Zlaté Moravce (loan)	11	(0)
2014–2015	→ Zlaté Moravce (loan)	26	(2)
2016–	FC Andau		
- * Club domestic league appearances and goals as of 2 September 2016

Patrik Sabo (born 9 March 1993) is a Slovak football midfielder who plays for FC Andau.

== Slovan Bratislava ==
He made his debut for ŠK Slovan Bratislava in home Europa League match against Videoton FC on 19 July 2012, the match ended 1 - 1 draw.
