= Martin Babic =

Slovak football midfielder

Personal information
- Full name: Martin Babic
- Date of birth: 27 July 1982 (age 44)
- Place of birth: Trnava, Czechoslovakia
- Height: 1.89 m (6 ft 2 in)
- Position: Midfielder

Team information
- Current team: Zlaté Moravce
- Number: 13

Youth career
- Spartak Trnava

Senior career*
| Years | Team | Apps | (Gls) |
| 2000–2001 | → ŠK Slávia Zeleneč (loan) | | |
| 2001–2003 | ŠK Slávia Zeleneč | | |
| 2002 | → Skloplast Trnava Hrnčiarovce (loan) | | |
| 2003–2010 | Nitra | 71 | (2) |
| 2005 | → Močenok (loan) | | |
| 2009 | → Jaslovské Bohunice (loan) | 15 | (5) |
| 2010– | FC ViOn | 66 | (5) |
| 2012–2013 | → Senica (loan) | 10 | (1) |
- * Club domestic league appearances and goals as of 20 April 2013

Martin Babic (born 27 July 1982) is a Slovak football midfielder who currently plays for the Slovak Corgoň Liga club FC ViOn Zlaté Moravce.
