= Patrik Pavlenda =

Slovak footballer

Personal information
- Full name: Patrik Pavlenda
- Date of birth: 3 May 1982 (age 44)
- Place of birth: Malacky, Czechoslovakia
- Height: 1.70 m (5 ft 7 in)
- Position: Right-back

Youth career
- 1989–2001: TJ Calex Zlaté Moravce
- 2001–2002: VTJ Malacky

Senior career*
Years	Team	Apps	(Gls)
2002–2007	Zlaté Moravce	44	(0)
2008–2009	Górnik Zabrze	12	(0)
2009–2015	Zlaté Moravce	179	(1)
2015–2016	TJ Slovan Čeľadice	12	(0)
2016	Nitra	7	(0)
2016–2020	Union Gschwandt		
2020–2021	Žarnovica		
2021–2022	OFK Tatran Topoľčianky		
2022–2023	ŠK Žitavany		

Managerial career
- 2022–2023: Slovan Levice
- * Club domestic league appearances and goals

Patrik Pavlenda (born 3 May 1982) is a Slovak football manager and former player who played as a right-back.

== Career ==
Pavlenda left ViOn Zlaté Moravce during the winter break of the 2007–08 season to join Polish club Górnik Zabrze. He played in Poland for a year, appearing in twelve league matches, before moving back to ViOn on 28 January 2010.

== Honours ==
ViOn Zlaté Moravce

- Slovak Cup: 2006–07
