= Peter Chrappan =

Slovak footballer (born 1984)

Personal information
- Date of birth: 21 December 1984 (age 41)
- Place of birth: Bratislava, Czechoslovakia
- Height: 1.91 m (6 ft 3 in)
- Position: Centre-back

Youth career
- Inter Bratislava

Senior career*
| Years | Team | Apps | (Gls) |
| 2003–2006 | Inter Bratislava | 18 | (0) |
| 2006 | → Dunajská Lužná (loan) | 22 | (1) |
| 2006–2009 | FC Stadlau | 26 | (1) |
| 2009–2011 | SV Mattersburg | 37 | (0) |
| 2011–2012 | Inter Baku | 21 | (0) |
| 2012 | Banská Bystrica | 9 | (0) |
| 2013 | Selangor | 6 | (0) |
| 2013–2014 | Zlaté Moravce | 25 | (1) |
| 2014–2017 | 1. FC Saarbrücken | 82 | (3) |
| 2017–2019 | Fola Esch | 22 | (0) |
- * Club domestic league appearances and goals

Peter Chrappan (born 21 December 1984) is a Slovak former professional footballer who played as a centre-back.

== Career ==
Starting his career at the youth teams of Inter Bratislava, he moved to Austria in 2006 to play with FC Stadlau, a club in the Austrian fourth tier league, and combining his football career with his studies there. He was transferred to Austrian Bundesliga side SV Mattersburg in 2009 after showing good performances with FC Stadlau. He played with the Mattersburg reserve team before making his debut for the first team in 2010.

Chrappan then moved to Azerbaijan in 2011 and joined Inter Baku. After only one season, he returned to Slovakia to play for Banská Bystrica.

In early 2013, Chrappan joined Malaysia Super League team Selangor for a six-month contract. He initially registered only to play for Selangor in AFC Cup competition as quota for non-local players in Malaysia Super League has already been filled. After Ramez Dayoub was suspended from football for life for match fixing charges, Chrappan was quickly registered by Selangor to play in Malaysia Super League and other local competition to replace Ramez. With the switch, Chrappan wore Ramez' number 5 in all local competition, in addition to number 14 he was registered in AFC competitions. His debut for Selangor in the league came in a goalless draw with PBDKT T-Team FC on 5 March 2013.

After the end of his contract with Selangor in June 2013, Chrappan returned to Slovakia to play for FC ViOn Zlaté Moravce in July 2013. A year later he signed for 1. FC Saarbrücken, before signing for Fola Esch in June 2017.
