= Salomon Wisdom =

Beninese footballer

Personal information
- Full name: Michel Wisdom Salomon Aka
- Date of birth: 1 October 1988 (age 38)
- Place of birth: Cotonou, Benin
- Height: 1.79 m (5 ft 10 in)
- Position: Forward

Senior career*
Years	Team	Apps	(Gls)
2004–2006	Soleil FC	48	(8)
2006–?	Žilina	1	(0)
2007–2008	→ Matador Púchov (loan)	3	(2)
2008–2009	→ ViOn Zlaté Moravce (loan)	16	(4)
2010	Melilla		
2011–2012	Ashanti Gold		
2012	Club Valencia	9	(7)
2013–2014	Malkiya Club		(7)
2014–2015	Al-Muharraq		
2015–2016	St. Andrews	16	(3)
2016–2017	Sliema Wanderers	24	(5)
2017–2018	Karbala SC		
2018	Al-Najaf		
2018–2019	Isa Town SC		

International career
2005–2012	Benin	2	(0)
- * Club domestic league appearances and goals

Michel Wisdom Salomon Aka (born 1 October 1988) is a Beninese former professional footballer who played as a forward.

== Career ==
Born in Cotonou, Wisdom began his career with Soleil FC. In July 2006 he transferred to Slovak Superliga champions MŠK Žilina where he remained half a year, plays his first game and was than loaned out to Matador Púchov in January 2007. In the II.liga (Západ) by Matador Púchov he was one-and-a-half years, before returning MŠK Žilina. In July 2008 was than loaned out to FC ViOn Zlaté Moravce, until 30 June 2009.

He joined Maldivian club Club Valencia for the 2012 season. In his debut match, which was Valencia's first match of the 2012 Dhivehi League he started in the starting line-up. He also scored the match winning goal in the 71st minute of the game. The match ended as a 1–0 victory over the Club All Youth Linkage.
