= Ľubomír Bernáth =

Slovak footballer

Personal information
- Full name: Ľubomír Bernáth
- Date of birth: 3 September 1985 (age 41)
- Place of birth: Nitra, Czechoslovakia
- Height: 1.87 m (6 ft 2 in)
- Position: Forward

Youth career
- ČFK Nitra

Senior career*
| Years | Team | Apps | (Gls) |
| 2003–2007 | Močenok | | |
| 2007–2011 | Spartak Trnava | 105 | (28) |
| 2012–2013 | Zlaté Moravce | 53 | (7) |
- * Club domestic league appearances and goals as of 1 January 2014

Ľubomír Bernáth (born 3 September 1985) is a Slovak football forward.

He previously played for ŠK Eldus Močenok and FC Spartak Trnava.
