= Erik Takáč =

Slovak footballer (born 1975)

Personal information
- Date of birth: 26 February 1975 (age 51)
- Place of birth: Trebišov, Czechoslovakia
- Height: 1.89 m (6 ft 2 in)
- Position: Forward

Youth career
- Trebišov
- 1997: → MFK Veľké Kapušany (loan)

Senior career*
Years	Team	Apps	(Gls)
–2001	Trebišov		
2001	Senec		
2002–2004	Slovan Bratislava		
2002	→ Senec (loan)		
2004–2007	Senec		
2007	→ Prešov (loan)		
2008–2010	Prešov		
2010	→ Lokomotíva Košice (loan)		
2010–2011	Lokomotíva Košice		
2011–2015	Trebišov		
- * Club domestic league appearances and goals

Erik Takáč (born 26 February 1975) is a Slovak former football forward.

He became joint top goalscorer of the 3. Liga in 2000–01, scoring 18 goals for Trebišov. This earned him interest from FK Humenné and Senec.
