= Choča =

Choča Hecse
- Municipality
- Flag

- Location of Choča in the Nitra Region Location of Choča in Slovakia
- Coordinates: 48.37°N 18.33°E
- Country: Slovakia
- Region: Nitra Region
- District: Zlaté Moravce District
- First mentioned: 1209

Area
  - Total: 4.38 km^{2} (1.69 sq mi)
- Elevation: 174 m (571 ft)

Population (2025)
  - Total: 472
- Time zone: UTC+1 (CET)
  - Summer (DST): UTC+2 (CEST)
- Postal code: 951 76
- Area code: +421 37
- Vehicle registration plate (until 2022): ZM
- Website: www.obecchoca.sk

Choča (Hungarian: Hecse) is a village and municipality in Zlaté Moravce District of the Nitra Region, in western-central Slovakia.

== History ==
In historical records the village was first mentioned in 1209.

== Geography ==
The municipality lies at an altitude of 174 metres (571 ft) and covers an area of 4.38 km^{2} (1.69 sq mi) (2025).

== Population ==
Population statistic (10 years)
Year	1995	2005	2015	2025
Count	463	485	508	472
Difference		+4.75%	+4.74%	−7.08%

Population statistic
Year	2024	2025
Count	470	472
Difference		+0.42%

It has a population of 472 people (31 December 2025).

=== Ethnicity ===
Census 2021 (1+ %)
Ethnicity	Number	Fraction
Slovak	480	95.8%
Not found out	20	3.99%
Romani	9	1.79%
Total	501	

In year 2021 was 501 people by ethnicity 480 as Slovak, 20 as Not found out, 9 as Romani, 3 as Czech, 2 as Polish and 1 as Jewish.

Note on population: The difference values of population numbers in the table "Population statistic" and in the sections "Ethnicity" & "Religion" is caused by the use of various statistical methods.

=== Religion ===
Census 2021 (1+ %)
Religion	Number	Fraction
Roman Catholic Church	342	68.26%
None	116	23.15%
Not found out	16	3.19%
Calvinist Church	7	1.4%
Christian Congregations in Slovakia	7	1.4%
Evangelical Church	6	1.2%
Total	501	

In year 2021 was 501 people by religion 342 from Roman Catholic Church, 116 from None, 16 from Not found out, 7 from Calvinist Church, 7 from Christian Congregations in Slovakia, 6 from Evangelical Church, 2 from Other, 1 from Hinduism, 1 from Greek Catholic Church, 1 from Church of the Brethren, 1 from Buddhism and 1 from Ad hoc movements.

== Facilities ==
The village has a small public library a gym and football pitch.

== See also ==
- List of municipalities and towns in Slovakia

== Genealogical resources ==
The records for genealogical research are available at the state archive "Statny Archiv in Nitra, Slovakia"

- Roman Catholic church records (births/marriages/deaths): 1697-1896 (parish B)
