= Ján Hözl =

Slovak footballer

Personal information
- Full name: Ján Hözl
- Date of birth: 13 February 1984 (age 42)
- Place of birth: Skýcov, Czechoslovakia
- Height: 1.82 m (5 ft 11 1/2 in)
- Position: Midfielder

Youth career
- Nitra

Senior career*
Years	Team	Apps	(Gls)
- FK Skýcov
- Calex Zlaté Moravce
?–2011	FC ViOn	49	(3)
2011	→ MFK Topoľčany (loan)		
2011	Lučenec	0	(0)
2012	Dunajská Streda	9	(0)
- * Club domestic league appearances and goals as of 31 May 2012

Ján Hözl (born 13 February 1984) is a Slovak football midfielder.
