= Lukáš Szabó =

Slovak footballer

Personal information
- Date of birth: 4 October 1992 (age 34)
- Place of birth: Czechoslovakia
- Height: 1.85 m (6 ft 1 in)
- Position: Forward

Team information
- Current team: Šamorín
- Number: 9

Youth career
- Šaľa
- –2012: Nitra

Senior career*
| Years | Team | Apps | (Gls) |
| 2012–2013 | Šaľa | 27 | (10) |
| 2013–2014 | Liberec | 2 | (0) |
| 2013–2014 | → Zlaté Moravce (loan) | 24 | (4) |
| 2015 | Slovan Duslo Šaľa | 31 | (9) |
| 2016–2018 | Győri ETO | 14 | (1) |
| 2018–2019 | Kazincbarcikai | 28 | (3) |
| 2019–2020 | Gyirmót | 14 | (0) |
| 2020–2021 | Lipót | | |
| 2021–2022 | Dorog | 35 | (4) |
| 2022–2025 | Šamorín | 38 | (11) |
| 2025– | Mezőörs KSE | | |

International career
| 2013 | Slovakia U21 | 3 | (0) |
- * Club domestic league appearances and goals as of 13 December 2025

Lukáš Szabó (born 4 October 1992) is a Slovak professional footballer who plays as a striker for Slovak club Šamorín.

== Club career ==
Szabó scored 10 goals in 27 games for Šaľa in his first season. He also made it to the Slovak national team under 21. His good performances led to rumors about him joining Slovak champions ŠK Slovan Bratislava.

=== Slovan Liberec ===
In 2013, he went on trials to FC Slovan Liberec. Szabó transferred to Liberec in summer 2013, from Slovak second level club FK Slovan Duslo Šaľa. He signed a 4 year contract with the Czech first division side. Szabó made his professional debut for Slovan Liberec on 21 July 2013 against SK Sigma Olomouc, entering in as a substitute in place of Michael Rabušic. After a promising start, his performance began to stagnate and he lost motivation. In 2013, Szabó joined FC ViOn Zlaté Moravce on a one year loan.

=== Zlaté Morevce ===
The 22-year-old Slovak striker joined FC ViOn Zlaté Moravce on a one year loan, playing in the DOXXbet 2nd league - West. ViOn finished the autumn in third place in the twelve-team table, where they are one point behind the second reserve MFK Žilina. The competition has eighteen rounds played, Szabó has started a total of fourteen matches, in which he played a total of 1169 minutes and scored five goals. The regular forward of our team also started four matches of the Slovak Cup, in which he maintained the average of goals scored per match and thus significantly helped Moravce to advance to the spring quarter-finals.

== International career ==
He is a former member of Slovakia under-21 team.
