= Juraj Pilát =

Slovak footballer

Personal information
- Full name: Juraj Pilát
- Date of birth: 2 February 1992 (age 34)
- Place of birth: Dolné Kočkovce, Czechoslovakia
- Height: 1.80 m (5 ft 11 in)
- Positions: Winger; fullback

Team information
- Current team: Púchov

Youth career
- Púchov

Senior career*
Years	Team	Apps	(Gls)
2010–2011	Púchov		
2012–2015	ViOn Zlaté Moravce	14	(0)
2012–2013	→ Sereď (loan)		
2013–2014	→ Púchov (loan)		
2015	→ TJ Slovan Dolné Kočkovce (loan)		
2016–2021	Púchov		

International career
2010	Slovakia U-19	3	(0)
- * Club domestic league appearances and goals as of 9 January 2020

Juraj Pilát (born 2 February 1992) is a Slovak former football midfielder who plays for Púchov.

== Career ==
Pilát made his first Corgoň Liga appearance for ViOn against AS Trenčín.
