= Peter Orávik =

Slovak footballer

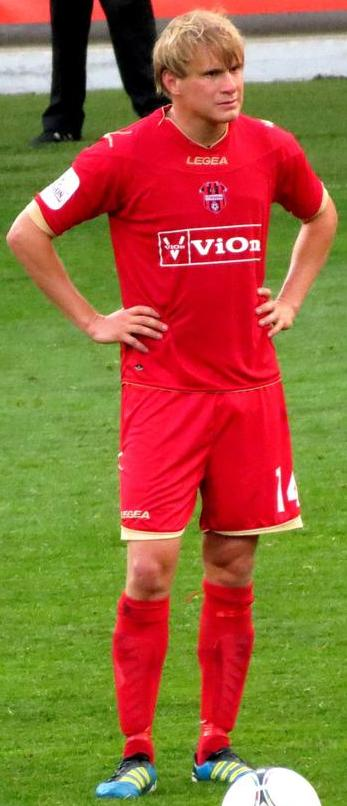

Personal information
- Full name: Peter Orávik
- Date of birth: 18 December 1988 (age 37)
- Place of birth: Považská Bystrica, Czechoslovakia
- Height: 1.76 m (5 ft 9 in)
- Position: Winger

Team information
- Current team: ViOn Zlaté Moravce
- Number: 18

Youth career
- Raven Považská Bystrica

Senior career*
Years	Team	Apps	(Gls)
2007–2009	Žiar nad Hronom		
2009	→ Dolný Kubín (loan)		
2009–2018	ViOn Zlaté Moravce	241	(32)
2009	→ Spartak Vráble (loan)		
2019–2021	ViOn Zlaté Moravce	27	(0)
2021-	Veľké Ludince	?	(?)
- * Club domestic league appearances and goals as of 8 January 2021

Peter Orávik (born 18 December 1988) is a Slovak footballer who plays as a midfielder for the Fortuna liga club ViOn Zlaté Moravce.
