= Adrián Candrák =

Slovak footballer

Personal information
- Full name: Adrián Candrák
- Date of birth: 18 December 1982 (age 43)
- Place of birth: Topoľčany, Czechoslovakia
- Height: 1.77 m (5 ft 10 in)
- Position: Midfielder

Team information
- Current team: FC ViOn
- Number: 9

Youth career
- Družstevník Čermany
- 2001: MFK Topoľčany

Senior career*
Years	Team	Apps	(Gls)
2001–2004	MFK Topoľčany		
2004–2007	SW Wulka Prodemsdorf		
2007–2008	OFK Chynorany		
2008–	Zlaté Moravce	174	(12)
- * Club domestic league appearances and goals as of 6 June 2013

Adrián Candrák (born 18 December 1982) is a Slovak football midfielder who currently plays for the Slovak Corgoň Liga club FC ViOn.
