= Martin Pribula =

Slovak footballer

Personal information
- Full name: Martin Pribula
- Date of birth: 29 November 1985 (age 40)
- Place of birth: Prešov, Czechoslovakia
- Height: 1.68 m (5 ft 6 in)
- Position: Winger

Team information
- Current team: FK Slovan Kendice

Youth career
- Tatran Prešov

Senior career*
Years	Team	Apps	(Gls)
2009–2015	Tatran Prešov	44	(1)
2011	→ Rimavská Sobota (loan)	11	(1)
2012	→ Rimavská Sobota (loan)	15	(5)
2013	→ Rimavská Sobota (loan)	14	(5)
2013–2014	→ ViOn Zlaté Moravce (loan)	33	(8)
2014	→ Frýdek-Místek (loan)	15	(0)
2015	Limanovia Limanowa	15	(11)
2015–2019	Zagłębie Sosnowiec	60	(17)
2019–2021	Železiarne Podbrezová	18	(6)
2021–2023	Tatran Prešov	15+	(1+)
2023	Spišská Nová Ves	11	(2)
2024–	FK Slovan Kendice		
- * Club domestic league appearances and goals as of 29 November 2024

Martin Pribula (born 29 November 1985) is a Slovak professional footballer who plays as a winger for FK Slovan Kendice.
