= Ján Kocian =

Slovak football coach and former player (born 1958)

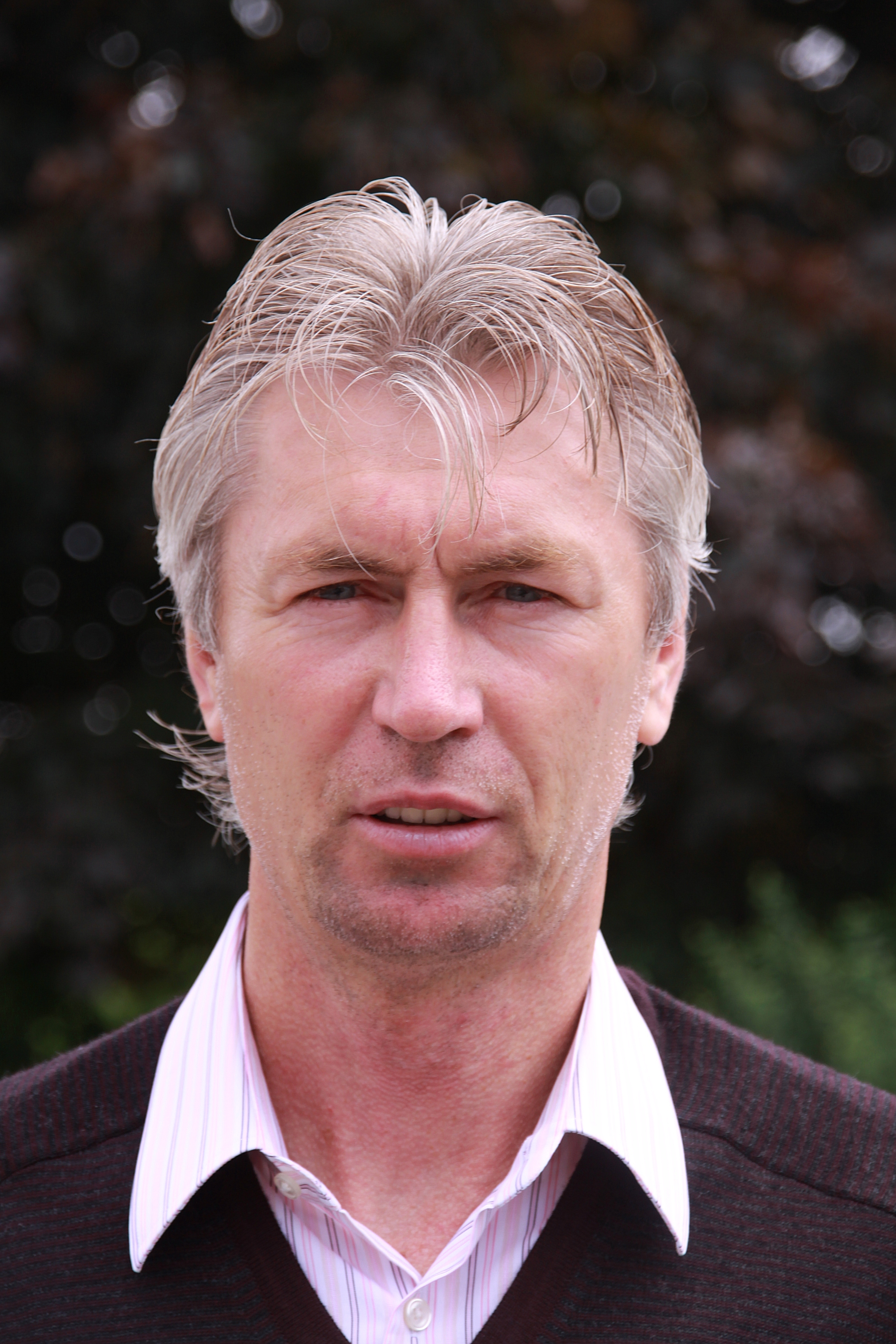

Personal information
- Date of birth: 13 March 1958 (age 68)
- Place of birth: Zlaté Moravce, Czechoslovakia
- Height: 1.92 m (6 ft 4 in)
- Position: Defender

Senior career*
Years	Team	Apps	(Gls)
1976–1979	ZŤS Martin		
1979–1988	Dukla Banská Bystrica	209	(20)
1988–1993	FC St. Pauli	129	(8)

International career
1984–1992	Czechoslovakia	26	(0)

Managerial career
- 1993–1995: Slovakia (assistant)
- 1996–1997: Dukla Banská Bystrica
- 1997–1998: Petra Drnovice
- 1999: VSS Košice
- 1999–2002: 1. FC Köln (assistant)
- 2002–2004: Eintracht Frankfurt (assistant)
- 2005: Rot-Weiß Erfurt
- 2005–2006: Sportfreunde Siegen
- 2006–2008: Slovakia
- 2008–2009: Austria (assistant)
- 2011: Jiangsu Sainty
- 2011–2012: South China
- 2013–2014: Ruch Chorzów
- 2014–2015: Pogoń Szczecin
- 2016–2017: Podbeskidzie Bielsko-Biała
- 2018–2019: Yemen
- 2022: ViOn Zlaté Moravce
- * Club domestic league appearances and goals

Ján Kocian (born 13 March 1958) is a Slovak professional football manager and former player who last managed Slovak First Football League club ViOn Zlaté Moravce. He also held managerial positions across Central Europe and Asia.

== Playing career ==
During his playing days, he made 209 appearances for Dukla Banská Bystrica between 1979 and 1988 before moving on to German club FC St. Pauli, where he made another 147 appearances up to 1993. He was the first Slovak person to play in the Bundesliga.

He was capped 26 times by Czechoslovakia. Playing at sweeper as the team reached the 1990 FIFA World Cup quarter-finals, Kocian was voted the country's player of the year in 1990.

== Managerial career ==
Kocian began his coaching career with Czech side Petra Drnovice before moving to the German Bundesliga clubs Rot-Weiß Erfurt and Sportfreunde Siegen. He worked as an assistant at 1.Bundesliga clubs 1. FC Köln and Eintracht Frankfurt.

He was appointed the new head coach of the Slovakia national team on 2 November 2006, replacing Dušan Galis. Previously, he had worked as an assistant to former national coach Dr. Jozef Vengloš between 1993 and 1995. He was last seven months Assistant Coach from Karel Brückner by Austria between 4 March 2009.

On 8 December 2010, Kocian was appointed head coach of the Chinese Super League team Jiangsu Sainty. On 28 June 2011, Kocian was announced as the Hong Kong First Division League team South China AA's new head coach. South China finished third in the 2011–12 Hong Kong First Division League. Kocian did not agree on a new contract after the end of the season.

In the 2013–14 season, Kocian managed Ruch Chorzow to third position in the Ekstraklasa table and qualified almost in the last qualifying round for Europe League Group stage. He earned by the Ekstraklasa Coach of the Year at the end of season. On 18 April 2019, Kocian returned to Poland and to his former club Ruch Chorzów as an advisor.

On 25 October 2018, Kocian was announced as manager of the Yemen national team. After the 2019 AFC Asian Cup, he left the national team. In spring of 2022, he returned to his native Zlaté Moravce to manage local Fortuna Liga club FC ViOn and aid in avoiding relegation in 2021–22 season. In early October, Kocian came to terms of release with ViOn Zlaté Moravce for medical reasons.

== Football affiliated activities ==
Since mid-2010s, Kocian began to feature more prominentnly as an expert analyst in the media, including national broadcaster RTVS for national team matches or major tournaments, such as UEFA Euro 2020 or 2022 FIFA World Cup. He also writes as a columnist contributor to leading Slovak sports daily newspaper Denník Šport.

== Honours ==
=== Manager ===
Individual

- Ekstraklasa Coach of the Season: 2013–14
