= Youssef Moughfire =

French footballer (born 1976)

Personal information
- Date of birth: 1 December 1976 (age 49)
- Place of birth: Lagny-sur-Marne, France
- Height: 1.78 m (5 ft 10 in)
- Position: Midfielder

Senior career*
Years	Team	Apps	(Gls)
1999–2000	Sedan		
2000	Thouars	34	(2)
2000–2001	Olympique Noisy-le-Sec	16	(1)
2001–2002	Cannes		
2002–2004	Panachaiki	17	(1)
2004–2005	SSV Ulm	33	(5)
2005–2007	Senec	10	(1)
2007–2008	Viktoria Žižkov	23	(2)
2008–2009	DAC Dunajská Streda	13	(0)
2008–2009	Issy		
2010–2011	Olympique Noisy-le-Sec	6	(0)
- * Club domestic league appearances and goals

Youssef Moughfire (born 1 December 1976) is a French former professional footballer who played as a midfielder.
