= Roman Mihálik =

Slovak footballer

Personal information
- Full name: Roman Mihálik
- Date of birth: 22 January 1988 (age 38)
- Place of birth: Czechoslovakia
- Height: 1.86 m (6 ft 1 in)
- Position: Centre back

Team information
- Current team: Šaľa

Youth career
- Inter Bratislava

Senior career*
Years	Team	Apps	(Gls)
2007–2009	Inter Bratislava		
2008–2009	→Prievidza (loan)		
2009–2011	Senica	6	(0)
2010	→Karviná (loan)	14	(0)
2011	→Šaľa (loan)		
2011	→Sereď (loan)		
2012–	Šaľa		
- * Club domestic league appearances and goals as of 11 March 2012

Roman Mihálik (born 22 January 1988) is a Slovak football defender who currently plays for the Slovak 3. liga club FK Slovan Duslo Šaľa.
