= Peter Černák =

Slovak football manager

Personal information
- Full name: Peter Černák
- Date of birth: 21 January 1976 (age 50)
- Place of birth: Handlová, Czechoslovakia
- Height: 1.85 m (6 ft 1 in)
- Position: Midfielder

Team information
- Current team: FC Košice (Caretaker manager)

Youth career
- 1986–1993: ŠKF Baník Handlová

Senior career*
Years	Team	Apps	(Gls)
1994–1995	ŠKF Baník Handlová	42	(6)
1995	→ Calex Zlaté Moravce (loan)	13	(8)
1996–1999	FK NCHZ Nováky	129	(44)
2000–2002	Spartak Trnava	41	(7)
2001	→ FK NCHZ Nováky (loan)	15	(3)
2002–2003	FK NCHZ Nováky	43	(6)
2003–2004	Topvar Horná Nitra Topoľčany		
2004	HFK Prievidza	40	(7)
2005–2007	ViOn Zlaté Moravce	72	(20)
2008–2009	Slovan Bratislava	51	(2)
2009–2011	Dynamo České Budějovice	46	(2)
2011–2014	Baník Horná Nitra	78	(21)

Managerial career
- 2014–2016: Baník Horná Nitra
- 2016: Pohronie
- 2019–2020: Žilina B
- 2021–2022: Žilina
- 2023–2025: DAC Dunajská Streda
- 2025: FC Košice U19
- 2025–: FC Košice
- * Club domestic league appearances and goals as of 11 November 2025

Peter Černák (born 21 January 1976) is a former Slovak football player and the current caretaker manager of FC Košice. He served as an assistant to Pavol Staňo in Žilina. He replaced Pavol Staňo as manager on 4 October 2021.

He played for Spartak Trnava, ViOn Zlaté Moravce and Slovan Bratislava in the Slovak top division and Dynamo České Budějovice in the Czech Gambrinus liga.
