= Martin Chren (footballer) =

Slovak footballer (born 1984)

Personal information
- Full name: Martin Chren
- Date of birth: 2 January 1984 (age 42)
- Place of birth: Zlaté Moravce, Czechoslovakia
- Height: 1.80 m (5 ft 11 in)
- Position: Left back

Youth career
- TJ Calex Zlaté Moravce

Senior career*
Years	Team	Apps	(Gls)
2005–2015	ViOn Zlaté Moravce	179	(6)
2015–2016	Horn	25	(1)
2016	Komárno	0	(0)
2017–2022	ViOn Zlaté Moravce	95	(2)
- * Club domestic league appearances and goals as of 15:48, 15 June 2022 (UTC)

Martin Chren (born 2 January 1984) is a retired Slovak football defender who last played for ViOn Zlaté Moravce.

Chren's career was linked with ViOn Zlaté Moravce for some 20 years. In June 2022, Chren retired from professional football.
