= FC ViOn Zlaté Moravce - Vráble B =

Slovak football club

FC ViOn Zlaté Moravce – Vráble B
- Full name: FC ViOn Zlaté Moravce – Vráble B
- Founded: 1919
- Ground: Štadión Vráble, Vráble
- Capacity: 5,000
- President: Marián Bafrnec
- Head coach: Roman Zima
- League: 3. liga
- 2017–18: 3. liga, 7th
Home colours	Away colours

FC ViOn Zlaté Moravce – Vráble B is a Slovak football team, based in the town of Vráble. The club was founded in 1919. The club is reserve team of FC ViOn Zlaté Moravce – Vráble.

== Current squad ==
As of 2 September 2018

Note: Flags indicate national team as defined under FIFA eligibility rules; some limited exceptions apply. Players may hold more than one non-FIFA nationality.

No.	Pos.	Nation	Player
1	GK	(Slovakia) SVK	Juraj Pichňa (3rd captain)
2	DF	(Slovakia) SVK	Roman Marhevszki
3	DF	(Slovakia) SVK	Igor Zelník
4	DF	(Slovakia) SVK	Stanislav Husár (captain)
5	DF	(Serbia) SRB	Aeksandar Miličevič
7	MF	(Slovakia) SVK	Tomáš Šlachta (vice-captain)
8	FW	(Slovakia) SVK	Juraj Krkoška
9	DF	(Slovakia) SVK	Patrik Balko
10	FW	(Slovakia) SVK	Michal Zrubec
11	MF	(Slovakia) SVK	Marek Švajlen
12	DF	(Slovakia) SVK	Dávid Šabík
13	DF	(Slovakia) SVK	Miroslav Plešivka
14	DF	(Nigeria) NGA	Wisdom Uda Kanu
15	MF	(Slovakia) SVK	Dávid Richtárech
16	MF	(Slovakia) SVK	Patrik Marek
17	MF	(Slovakia) SVK	Dávid Hamar
18	MF	(Slovakia) SVK	Erik Sabo
19	MF	(Slovakia) SVK	Samuel Budinský
20	GK	(Slovakia) SVK	Juraj Hejtmánek
