= Zlaté Moravce =

Zlaté Moravce Aranyosmarót
- Municipality
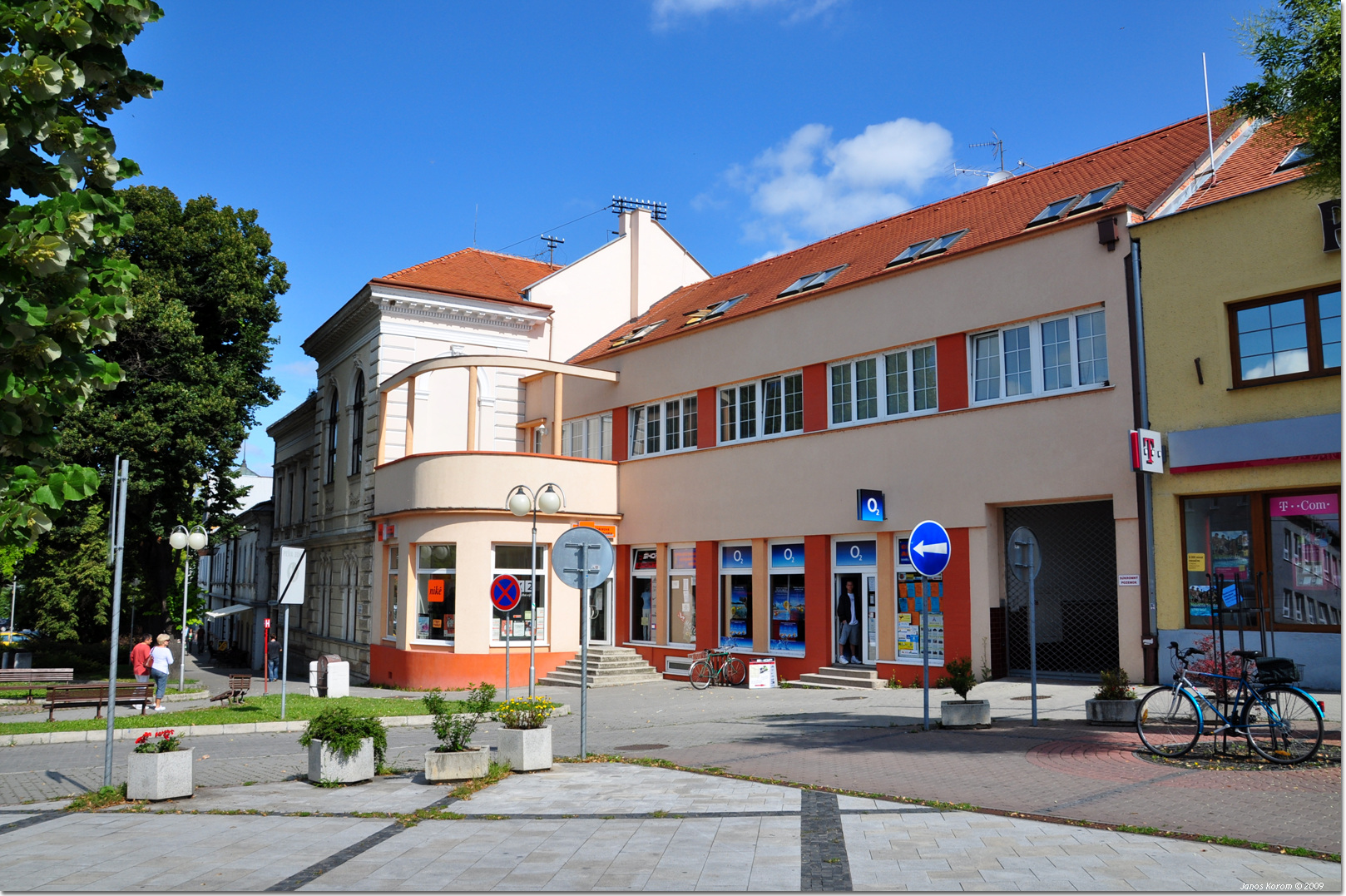
- View of the town center

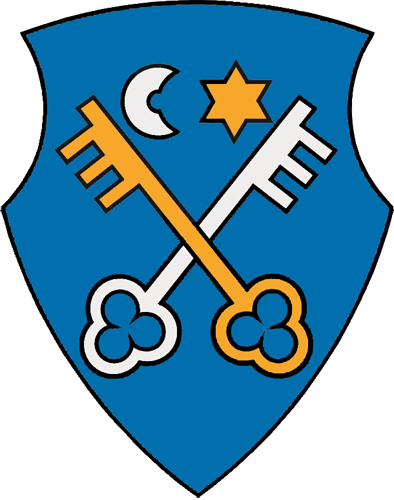
- Flag Coat of arms

- Location of Zlaté Moravce in the Nitra Region Location of Zlaté Moravce in Slovakia
- Coordinates: 48.38°N 18.40°E
- Country: Slovakia
- Region: Nitra Region
- District: Zlaté Moravce District
- First mentioned: 1113

Government
  - Mayor: Dušan Husár

Area
  - Total: 45.35 km^{2} (17.51 sq mi)
- Elevation: 192 m (630 ft)

Population (2025)
  - Total: 11,733
- Time zone: UTC+1 (CET)
  - Summer (DST): UTC+2 (CEST)
- Postal code: 953 01
- Area code: +421 37
- Vehicle registration plate (until 2022): ZM
- Website: www.zlatemoravce.eu

Zlaté Moravce (Slovak pronunciation: [ˈzlateː ˈmɔrawtse]; 1776 Morawce, Hungarian: Aranyosmarót, German: Goldmorawitz) is a town in south-western Slovakia.

== Geography ==
The municipality lies at an altitude of 192 metres (630 ft) and covers an area of 45.35 km^{2} (17.51 sq mi) (2025).

It is the capital and the biggest town of Zlaté Moravce District. It is approximately 120 km from the Slovak capital Bratislava and 32 km from Nitra.

== History ==
The town is situated on the banks of the river Žitava, in the northern part of the Podunajská Heights. Nowadays, it also includes the area of formerly separate boroughs Chyzerovce and Prílepy. Thanks to its favourable location on the natural terrace of the river Žitava, the traces of the continuous settlement of this area go back to the Paleolithic Age. The rich archaeological findings in the town area also prove intensive Great Moravian settlement in the 9th-10th century. A unique finding – a golden pectoral cross – is associated with this settlement.

The origin of the oldest name of the borough "Morowa" in the Charter of Zobor of 1113 is related to that time as well. This charter is the oldest written proof of the existence of Moravce as Zobor Monastery's property. The borough that was situated on the important route to Tekov was already in the 13th century dominated by a small Roman church surrounded by a cemetery, which was located on the site of today's square.

The first written mentions of the town are from 12th century (1113 Morowa, 1284 Marouth). "Moravce" [pronounced app. Moravtseh], a word in plural, was a frequent settlement name in Slovakia and means "settlement of (the tribe) Moravians". The attribute zlaté, meaning 'golden', was added only later in order to distinguish the settlement's name from other places alled Moravce. Ottomans plundered the city in 1530 and 1573. Rivers (Žitava, Zlatnanka) in the surrounding areas were known in the past for gold washing. Note the name of the second river. Across Slavic languages, Zlato means gold.

In late 1700s, the town was purchased by Cristoph Cardinal Migazzi, who completed renovations of local chateau for purposes of his private summer residence.

== Population ==
Historical population
Year	Pop.	±%
1970	11,504	—
1980	14,119	+22.7%
1991	15,820	+12.0%
2001	15,618	−1.3%
2011	12,337	−21.0%
2021	11,946	−3.2%
Source: Censuses

Population statistic (10 years)
Year	1995	2005	2015	2025
Count	15,610	13,476	11,787	11,733
Difference		−13.67%	−12.53%	−0.45%

Population statistic
Year	2024	2025
Count	11,762	11,733
Difference		−0.24%

It has a population of 11,733 people (31 December 2025).

Zlaté Moravce has a town status from 1960.

=== Ethnicity ===
Census 2021 (1+ %)
Ethnicity	Number	Fraction
Slovak	10,800	90.4%
Not found out	1033	8.64%
Romani	222	1.85%
Total	11,946	

In year 2021 was 11,946 people by ethnicity 10,800 as Slovak, 1033 as Not found out, 222 as Romani, 101 as Czech, 51 as Hungarian, 27 as Other, 25 as Russian, 16 as Polish, 16 as German, 13 as Chinese, 10 as Rusyn, 8 as Austrian, 7 as Serbian, 6 as Moravian, 5 as Ukrainian, 2 as Italian, 2 as French, 2 as Bulgarian, 2 as Albanian, 1 as Jewish, 1 as Greek and 1 as English.

Note on population: The difference values of population numbers in the table "Population statistic" and in the sections "Ethnicity" & "Religion" is caused by the use of various statistical methods.

An active Jewish community had existed here until the Holocaust.

=== Religion ===
Census 2021 (1+ %)
Religion	Number	Fraction
Roman Catholic Church	7807	65.35%
None	2459	20.58%
Not found out	1191	9.97%
Evangelical Church	141	1.18%
Total	11,946	

In year 2021 was 11,946 people by religion 7807 from Roman Catholic Church, 2459 from None, 1191 from Not found out, 141 from Evangelical Church, 62 from Greek Catholic Church, 48 from Ad hoc movements, 41 from Jehovah's Witnesses, 34 from Christian Congregations in Slovakia, 32 from Other, 19 from Paganism and natural spirituality, 18 from Old Catholic Church, 16 from Calvinist Church, 16 from Other and not ascertained christian church, 15 from Apostolic Church, 12 from Eastern Orthodox Church, 12 from Buddhism, 8 from Islam, 6 from Seventh-day Adventist Church, 4 from Church of the Brethren, 1 from Jewish community, 1 from Hinduism, 1 from Czechoslovak Hussite Church, 1 from Church of Jesus Christ of Latter-day Saints and 1 from Baptists Church.

== Industry ==
The town is known for the production of kitchen technologies (well known under the brand CALEX, which no longer exists) and building materials such as bricks.

== Historical monuments ==
- WWI and WWII victims
- Holocaust victims from Zlaté Moravce memorial

== Notable people ==
- Janko Kráľ, a poet of Slovak Romanticism
- Ján Kocian, footballer, football trainer
- Tono Stano, photographer
- Imrich Chlamtac, President of EAI

== Twin towns — sister cities ==
Zlaté Moravce is twinned with:

- Bučovice, Czech Republic
- Hulín, Czech Republic
- Velké Přílepy, Czech Republic
- Našice, Croatia
- Sierpc, Poland
- Szydłów, Poland
