= FC ViOn Zlaté Moravce =

Slovak football club

ViOn Zlaté Moravce
- Full name: Football Club Viliam Ondrejka Zlaté Moravce – Vráble
- Founded: 1995; 31 years ago as FC ViOn
- Ground: ViOn Aréna, Zlaté Moravce
- Capacity: 4,006
- Owner: Viliam Ondrejka
- Chairman: Karol Škula
- Manager: Peter Gaži
- League: 2. Liga
- 2025–26: 7th
- Website: fcvion.sk
| Home colours | Away colours |

FC ViOn Zlaté Moravce – Vráble is a Slovak football team, based in the town of Zlaté Moravce. The club was founded on 22 January 1995.

== History ==
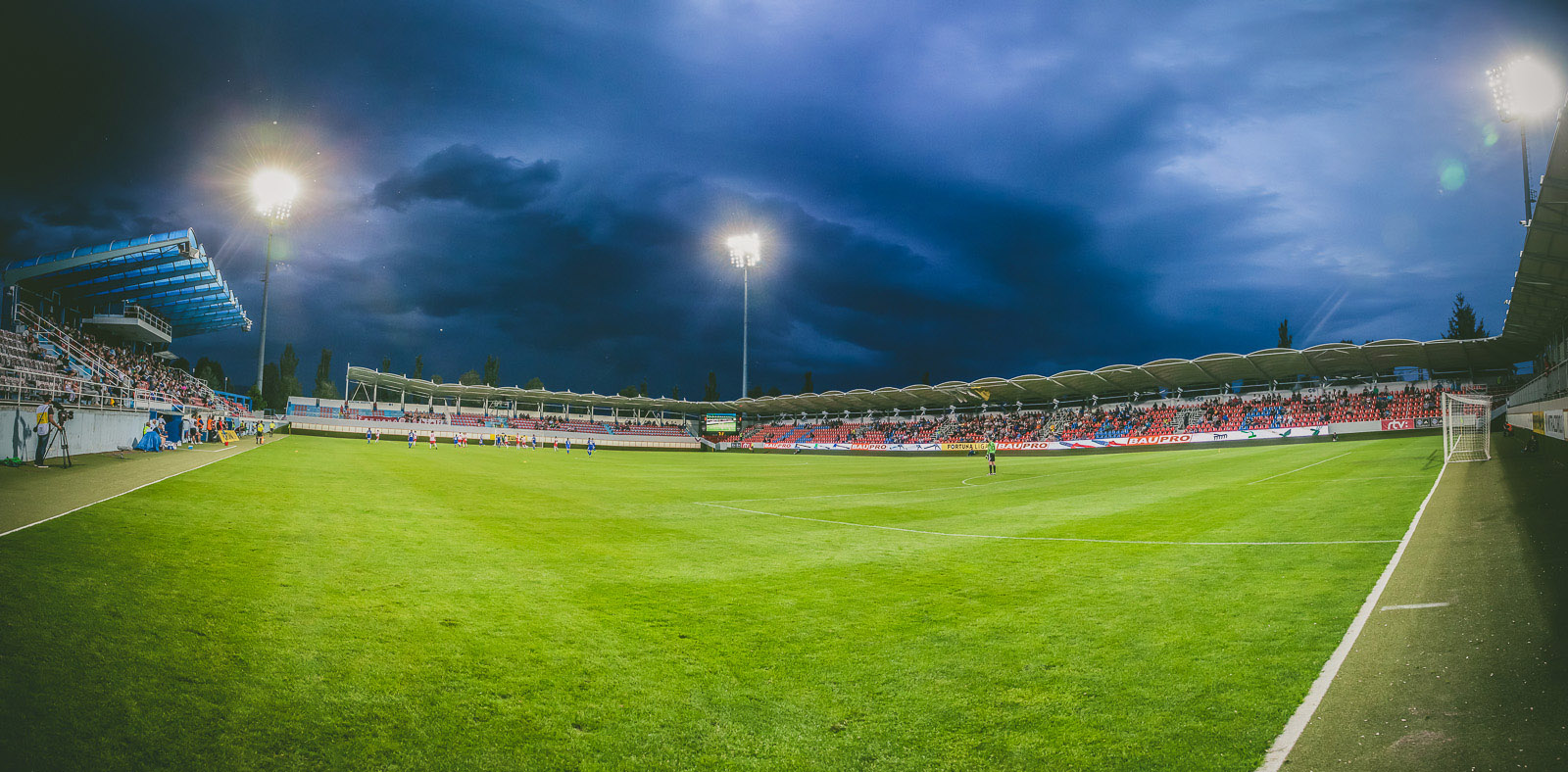
Stadium FC ViOn

From the club's establishment in 1995 until 2004, they played in various regional competitions. In 2004 they were promoted to the Slovak Second Division. In the 2006–07 season they won the Slovak Cup as a second-tier side, beating FC Senec 4–0 in the final. This earned them a place in the first qualifying round of the 2007–08 UEFA Cup. Weeks later they were promoted to the Corgoň Liga, after finishing third in the promotion/relegation playoff.

Zlaté Moravce played their first European match on 19 July 2007 in the UEFA Cup at home against Alma-Ata, winning 3–1. On 2 August 2007, they drew 1–1 in Almaty, advancing to the second qualification round. In front of a crowd of 3,368, the club played the first leg of the second qualifying round at home against Russian side Zenit Saint Petersburg, losing the match 2–0. Two weeks later in the return leg, held in Russia, Saint Petersburg won 3–0 to advance to the next round 5–0 on aggregate.

=== Events timeline ===
- 1995 – Founded as FC ViOn Zlaté Moravce
- 2016 – Renamed FC ViOn Zlaté Moravce – Vráble

== Honours ==
=== Domestic ===
- Slovak Cup (1961–)
  - Winners (1): 2006–07
- Slovak Second Division (1993–)
  - Winners (1): 2009–10

== Affiliated clubs ==
The following clubs are affiliated with FC ViOn:

- (Italy) SPAL (2019–present)

== Sponsorship ==
| Period | Kit manufacturer | Shirt sponsor |
|---|---|---|
| 2004–05 | Legea | ViOn |
| 2005–07 | Adidas | ViOn |
| 2007–08 | Jako | ViOn |
| 2008–09 | Adidas | ViOn |
| 2009–10 | Puma | ViOn |
| 2010–13 | Legea | ViOn |
| 2013–14 | Luanvi | ViOn |
| 2014–2022 | Erreà | ViOn |
| 2022 | Erreà | Tipsport |
| 2022- | Puma | Tipsport |

=== Club partners ===
- ViOn
- Hydina Súlovce
- Kameň Slovakia
- KTL
- Nitrazdroj
- Novoprint
- Svet minerálov
- Slovanet
- Financie Complet

== Current squad ==
As of 21 July 2026

Note: Flags indicate national team as defined under FIFA eligibility rules; some limited exceptions apply. Players may hold more than one non-FIFA nationality.

| No. | Pos. | Nation | Player |
|---|---|---|---|
| 2 | DF | SVK | Šimon Mičuda |
| 3 | DF | SVK | Roland Buhaj |
| 8 | MF | POL | Oskar Lachowicz |
| 9 | FW | CZE | Adam Pudil |
| 10 | FW | SVK | Samuel Kuchárik |
| 11 | MF | SVK | Dávid Bugár |
| 13 | DF | SVK | Andrej Redenkovič |
| 14 | MF | SVK | Denis Duga |
| 17 | DF | CZE | Daniel Kutík |
| 20 | MF | GAM | Saihou Sonko |
| 22 | DF | SVK | Martin Konopka |

| No. | Pos. | Nation | Player |
|---|---|---|---|
| 24 | MF | SVK | Martinko Macák |
| 25 | MF | GAM | Ali Ousaye |
| 26 | DF | SVK | Samuel Bagín |
| 27 | DF | SEN | Youssou Diop |
| 28 | MF | SVK | Martin Bukata |
| 31 | GK | CZE | Matyáš Trešl (on loan from Vysočina Jihlava) |
| 34 | DF | SVK | Matej Majercik |
| 41 | GK | SVK | Patrik Vasiľ (on loan from FC Spartak Trnava) |
| 77 | MF | SVK | Leonardo Bortoli |
| 89 | MF | SVK | Maximilián Halo |
| 99 | MF | SVK | Sebastian Maťo |

For recent transfers, see List of Slovak football transfers summer 2026.

=== Out on loan ===
Note: Flags indicate national team as defined under FIFA eligibility rules; some limited exceptions apply. Players may hold more than one non-FIFA nationality.

| No. | Pos. | Nation | Player |
|---|---|---|---|
| — | FW | SVK | Martinko Macak (at Slovan Galanta until 30 June 2027) |

== Management staff ==
| Position | Staff |
|---|---|
| Manager | (Slovakia) Peter Gaži |
| Assistant Manager | (Slovakia) Pevel Medveď |
| Goalkeeping coach | (Slovakia) Martin Matlák |
| Sport Director | (Slovakia) Ľubomír Michalík |
| Fitness coach | (Slovakia) Milan Ivanka |
| Team chef | (Slovakia) Vladimír Červený |
| Masseur | (Slovakia) Ján Andraško |
| Physioterapist | (Slovakia) MUDr. Jozef Mada |

== Results ==
=== League and Cup history ===
Slovak League only (1993–present)

| Season | Division (Name) | Pos./Teams | Slovak Cup | Europe | | Top Scorer (Goals) |
|---|---|---|---|---|---|---|
| 2000–01 | 3rd (2. Liga) | 1 | Did not enter | | | (Slovakia) Jozef Piaček (11) (Slovakia) Róbert Michalík (11) |
| 2001–02 | 2nd (1. Liga) | 16/(16) | Preliminary round | | | ? |
| 2002–03 | 3rd (2. Liga) | 10 | Did not enter | | | ? |
| 2003–04 | 3rd (2. Liga) | 2 | Did not enter | | | (Slovakia) Juraj Vondra (18) |
| 2004–05 | 2nd (1.Liga) | 8/(16) | Quarter-finals | | | (Slovakia) Peter Černák (6) |
| 2005–06 | 2nd (1.Liga) | 8/(16) | Round 1 | | | (Slovakia) Peter Černák (5) (Slovakia) Martin Chren (5) |
| 2006–07 | 2nd (1.Liga) | 3/(12) | Winner | | | (Slovakia) Marek Plichta (9) |
| 2007–08 | 1st (Corgoň Liga) | 11/(12) | Round 3 | UC | Q2 ( (Russia) Zenit St. Petersburg) | (Slovakia) Peter Černák (4) |
| 2008–09 | 1st (Corgoň Liga) | 12/(12) | Quarter-finals | | | (Benin) Salomon Wisdom (4) |
| 2009–10 | 2nd (DoxxBet Liga) | 1/(14) | Round 3 | | | (Slovakia) Karol Pavelka (16) |
| 2010–11 | 1st (Corgoň Liga) | 6/(12) | Semi-finals | | | (Slovakia) Peter Kuračka (7) |
| 2011–12 | 1st (Corgoň Liga) | 7/(12) | Semi-finals | | | (Czech Republic) Martin Hruška (6) |
| 2012–13 | 1st (Corgoň Liga) | 8/(12) | Round 3 | | | (Slovakia) Andrej Hodek (13) |
| 2013–14 | 1st (Corgoň Liga) | 10/(12) | Quarter-finals | | | (Slovakia) Martin Pribula (8) |
| 2014–15 | 1st (Fortuna Liga) | 10/(12) | Round 5 | | | (Slovakia) Martin Juhar (4) (Slovakia) Márius Charizopulos (4) |
| 2015–16 | 1st (Fortuna Liga) | 9/(12) | Quarter-finals | | | (Cameroon) Leandre Tawamba (11) |
| 2016–17 | 1st (Fortuna Liga) | 10/(12) | Round 4 | | | (Slovakia) Peter Orávik (5) |
| 2017–18 | 1st (Fortuna Liga) | 10/(12) | Round 3 | | | (Slovakia) Róbert Gešnábel (9) |
| 2018–19 | 1st (Fortuna Liga) | 10/(12) | Round of 16 | | | (Slovakia) Tomáš Ďubek (9) |
| 2019–20 | 1st (Fortuna Liga) | 8/(12) | Semi-finals | | | (Slovakia) Tomáš Ďubek (8) |
| 2020–21 | 1st (Fortuna Liga) | 5/(12) | Quarter-finals | | | (Slovakia) Filip Balaj (16) |
| 2021–22 | 1st (Fortuna Liga) | 11/(12) | Quarter-finals | | | (Slovakia) Tomáš Ďubek (7) |
| 2022–23 | 1st (Fortuna Liga) | 11/(12) | Round of 16 | | | (Slovakia) Adam Brenkus (7) |
| 2023–24 | 1st (Niké Liga) | 12/(12) | Round of 16 | | | (Slovakia) Marek Kuzma (4) (Slovakia) Karol Mondek (4) |
| 2024–25 | 2nd (MonacoBet Liga) | 2/(14) | Round of 16 | | | (Georgia (country)) Levan Nonikashvili (9) |
| 2025–26 | 2nd (MonacoBet Liga) | 7/(16) | Round 4 | | | (Slovakia) Filip Balaj (10) |

=== European competition history ===
| Season | Competition | Round | Country | Club | Home | Away | Aggregate |
|---|---|---|---|---|---|---|---|
| 2007–08 | UEFA Cup | 1Q | (Kazakhstan) | Alma-Ata | 3–1 | 1–1 | 4–2 |
| 2007–08 | UEFA Cup | 2Q | (Russia) | Zenit St. Petersburg | 0–2 | 0–3 | 0–5 |

== Youth program ==
The club is also particularly known for its youth program. Academy name is PFA (Požitavská futbalová akadémia).

== Player records ==
=== Most goals ===
| # | Nat. | Name | Goals |
|---|---|---|---|
| 1 | (Slovakia) | Filip Balaj | 34 |
| 2 | (Slovakia) | Peter Orávik | 32 |
| 3 | (Slovakia) | Tomáš Ďubek | 30 |
| 4 | (Slovakia) | Peter Černák | 28 |
| 4 | (Slovakia) | Karol Pavelka | 28 |
| 5 | (Slovakia) | Peter Kuračka | 26 |
| 6 | (Slovakia) | Marek Kuzma | 23 |
| 7 | (Slovakia) | Karol Mondek | 20 |
| 8 | (Slovakia) | Andrej Hodek | 18 |

Players whose name is listed in bold are still active.

== Notable players ==
Had international caps on senior level for their respective countries. Players whose name is listed in bold represented their countries while playing for FC ViOn.

Past (and present) players who are the subjects of Wikipedia articles can be found here.

- (Slovakia) Martin Bukata
- (Canada) Stefan Cebara
- (Slovakia) Roman Čerepkai
- (Slovakia) Martin Dobrotka
- (Slovakia) Tomáš Ďubek
- (Slovakia) Martin Fabuš
- (Malaysia) Irfan Fazail
- (Czechoslovakia) (Slovakia) Miloš Glonek
- (North Macedonia) **Tomche Grozdanovski**
- (Malaysia) Wan Zack Haikal
- (Slovakia) Dominik Holec
- (Slovakia) David Hrnčár
- (Slovakia) Tomáš Hubočan
- (Central African Republic) Jésus Konnsimbal
- (North Macedonia) Tihomir Kostadinov
- (Slovakia) Pavel Kováč
- (Greece) Alexandros Kyziridis
- (Slovakia) Štefan Maixner
- (Slovakia) Pavol Majerník
- (The Gambia) Lamin Samateh
- (Malaysia) Fadhli Shas
- (Slovakia) Milan Škriniar
- (Slovakia) Michal Škvarka
- (Cameroon) Léandre Tawamba
- (Slovakia) Marek Ujlaky
- (Indonesia) **Egy Maulana Vikri**
- (Benin) Salomon Wisdom

== Managers ==
- (Slovakia) Anton Dragúň (2004 – 2006)
- (Slovakia) Ján Rosinský (2005 - 2008)
- (Slovakia) Ľubomír Moravčík (1 Jul 2008 – 30 Nov 2008)
- (Slovakia) Štefan Horný (1 Dec 2008 – 5 Oct 2009)
- (Slovakia) Juraj Jarábek (5 Oct 2009 – 30 May 2013)
- (Slovakia) Branislav Mráz (May 2013 – Jun 2015)
- (North Macedonia) Milko Djurovski (15 Jun 2015 – 23 Aug 2015)
- (Slovakia) Libor Fašiang (23 Aug 2015 – 23 May 2016)
- (Slovakia) Peter Gergely (23 May 2016 – 6 Nov 2016)
- (Slovakia) Juraj Jarábek (6 Nov 2016 – 5 Nov 2018)
- (Slovakia) Branislav Mráz (car.) (5 Nov 2018 – 13 Dec 2018)
- (Slovakia) Karol Praženica (13 Dec 2018 – 30 Jun 2020)
- (Slovakia) Branislav Mráz (car.) (1 Jul 2020 – 11 Jul 2020)
- (Slovakia) Ľuboš Benkovský (11 Jul 2020 – 5 May 2022)
- (Slovakia) Ján Kocian (5 May 2022 – 4 Oct 2022)
- (Slovakia) Ivan Galád (5 Oct 2022 – 5 Jun 2023)
- (Slovakia) Vladimír Cifranič (12 Jun 2023 – 12 Nov 2023)
- (Slovakia) Michal Hipp (13 Nov 2023 – 21 Feb 2024)
- (Czech Republic) Dušan Uhrin Jr. (26 Feb 2024 – 26 May 2024)
- (Slovakia) Roman Hudec (26 May 2024 – 26 Oct 2025)
- (Slovakia) Pavel Medveď (car.) (26 Oct 2025 – 12 Dec 2025)
- (Czech Republic) Jiří Vágner (12 Dec 2025 – May 2026)
- (Slovakia) Peter Gaži (May 2026- )
