= List of Slovak football transfers winter 2017–18 =

Notable Slovak football transfers in the winter transfer window 2017–18 by club. Only transfers of the Fortuna Liga and 2. Liga are included.

== Fortuna Liga ==
=== FC Spartak Trnava ===
In: Note: Flags indicate national team as defined under FIFA eligibility rules; some limited exceptions apply. Players may hold more than one non-FIFA nationality.

| No. | Pos. | Nation | Player |
|---|---|---|---|
| — | GK | SVK | Martin Vantruba (on loan from (Czech Republic) SK Slavia Prague) |
| — | MF | GER | Reagy Ofosu (from (Croatia) NK Istra 1961) |
| — | FW | MKD | Stefan Bogdanovski (from FC Spartak Trnava II) |
| — | DF | BIH | Eldar Čivić (on loan from (Czech Republic) AC Sparta Prague) |

Out: Note: Flags indicate national team as defined under FIFA eligibility rules; some limited exceptions apply. Players may hold more than one non-FIFA nationality.

| No. | Pos. | Nation | Player |
|---|---|---|---|
| — | GK | SVK | Martin Vantruba (to (Czech Republic) SK Slavia Prague) |
| — | DF | SRB | Slavko Lukić (to (Uzbekistan) FC Nasaf) |
| — | MF | SVK | Lukáš Mihálik (on loan to ŠKF Sereď) |
| — | FW | CIV | Kouakou Privat Yao (Released) |
| — | MF | BEN | Babatounde Bello (Released) |

=== MŠK Žilina ===
In: Note: Flags indicate national team as defined under FIFA eligibility rules; some limited exceptions apply. Players may hold more than one non-FIFA nationality.

| No. | Pos. | Nation | Player |
|---|---|---|---|
| — | MF | SVK | František Kubík (from Slovan Bratislava) |
| — | FW | SVK | Filip Balaj (from FC Nitra) |
| — | MF | SVK | Martin Gamboš (on loan from (Germany) TSV 1860 Munich) |
| — | FW | SVK | Jaroslav Mihalík (on loan from (Poland) KS Cracovia) |
| — | DF | SVK | Branislav Niňaj (on loan from (Belgium) Lokeren) |

Out: Note: Flags indicate national team as defined under FIFA eligibility rules; some limited exceptions apply. Players may hold more than one non-FIFA nationality.

| No. | Pos. | Nation | Player |
|---|---|---|---|
| 15 | DF | SVK | Róbert Mazáň (to (Spain) Celta de Vigo) |
| 10 | FW | SVK | Nikolas Špalek (to (Italy) Brescia Calcio) |
| — | MF | MDA | Eugeniu Cociuc (on loan to (Azerbaijan) Sabail FK) |
| — | FW | LTU | Eligijus Jankauskas (on loan to MFK Zemplín Michalovce) |
| — | FW | NGR | Yusuf Otubanjo (on loan to (Austria) SC Rheindorf Altach) |

=== ŠK Slovan Bratislava ===
In: Note: Flags indicate national team as defined under FIFA eligibility rules; some limited exceptions apply. Players may hold more than one non-FIFA nationality.

| No. | Pos. | Nation | Player |
|---|---|---|---|
| 20 | MF | NED | Ricky van Haaren (from AS Trenčín) |
| 9 | FW | SLO | Andraž Šporar (from (Switzerland) FC Basel) |
| 23 | DF | UKR | Artem Sukhotskyi (from (Ukraine) FC Zorya Luhansk) |
| 30 | GK | SVK | Michal Šulla (from FK Senica) |
| — | DF | CZE | Jurij Medveděv (from FK Senica) |
| — | MF | SVK | Marek Rigo (loan return from FK Senica) |
| 66 | DF | SLO | Kenan Bajrić (from (Slovenia) NK Olimpija Ljubljana) |
| 12 | FW | MNE | Boris Cmiljanić (from Free Agent) |
| 7 | FW | MAR | Moha (from (Ukraine) Olimpik Donetsk) |
| 13 | MF | ESP | Nono (from (Hungary) Diósgyőri VTK) |

Out: Note: Flags indicate national team as defined under FIFA eligibility rules; some limited exceptions apply. Players may hold more than one non-FIFA nationality.

| No. | Pos. | Nation | Player |
|---|---|---|---|
| — | FW | SVK | František Kubík (Released and joined MŠK Žilina) |
| — | MF | SVK | Marek Rigo (on loan to FC ViOn Zlaté Moravce) |
| — | DF | SVK | Juraj Kotula (on loan to FC ViOn Zlaté Moravce) |
| 26 | FW | CZE | Jakub Mareš (to (Poland) Zagłębie Lubin) |
| — | DF | CZE | Jurij Medveděv (on loan to FK Senica) |

=== FC DAC 1904 Dunajská Streda ===
In: Note: Flags indicate national team as defined under FIFA eligibility rules; some limited exceptions apply. Players may hold more than one non-FIFA nationality.

| No. | Pos. | Nation | Player |
|---|---|---|---|
| — | DF | SVK | Timotej Záhumenský (from FC ViOn Zlaté Moravce) |
| — | DF | CIV | Souleymane Kone (on loan from (Sweden) Djurgårdens IF Fotboll) |
| — | MF | SVK | Christián Herc (on loan from (England) Wolverhampton Wanderers F.C.) |
| — | FW | SVK | Roland Černák (loan return from 1. FC Tatran Prešov) |
| — | GK | CZE | Martin Jedlička (on loan from (Czech Republic) FK Mladá Boleslav) |
| — | FW | CIV | Vakoun Issouf Bayo (Free Agent) |

Out: Note: Flags indicate national team as defined under FIFA eligibility rules; some limited exceptions apply. Players may hold more than one non-FIFA nationality.

| No. | Pos. | Nation | Player |
|---|---|---|---|
| — | FW | NGR | Musefiu Ashiru (loan return to (Czech Republic) FC Zbrojovka Brno) |
| — | MF | SVK | Branislav Ľupták (End of contract and joined MFK Ružomberok) |
| — | FW | SVK | Tomáš Malec (to (Lithuania) FK Žalgiris) |
| — | DF | SVK | Dominik Špiriak (on loan to KFC Komárno) |
| — | MF | SVK | Kristóf Domonkos (on loan to KFC Komárno) |
| — | FW | SVK | András Mészáros (on loan to KFC Komárno) |
| — | FW | SVK | Jakub Kosorin (Released) |
| — | MF | SVK | Zoltán Kontár (to FC DAC 1904 Dunajská Streda II) |
| — | DF | BIH | Branko Bajić (to FC DAC 1904 Dunajská Streda II) |
| — | MF | CMR | Noé Kwin (to FC DAC 1904 Dunajská Streda II) |

=== MFK Ružomberok ===
In: Note: Flags indicate national team as defined under FIFA eligibility rules; some limited exceptions apply. Players may hold more than one non-FIFA nationality.

| No. | Pos. | Nation | Player |
|---|---|---|---|
| — | FW | SVK | Róbert Gešnábel (from FC ViOn Zlaté Moravce) |
| — | MF | SVK | Branislav Ľupták (from FC DAC 1904 Dunajská Streda) |
| — | MF | SVK | Adam Brenkus (from AS Trenčín youth) |
| — | GK | SVK | Lukáš Urminský (from FK Pohronie) |
| — | DF | SVK | Lukáš Ondrek (loan return from MFK Tatran Liptovský Mikuláš) |
| — | FW | CZE | David Čapek (on loan from (Czech Republic) Sparta Prague) |

Out: Note: Flags indicate national team as defined under FIFA eligibility rules; some limited exceptions apply. Players may hold more than one non-FIFA nationality.

| No. | Pos. | Nation | Player |
|---|---|---|---|
| — | MF | SVK | Marek Sapara (Retired) |

=== AS Trenčín ===
In: Note: Flags indicate national team as defined under FIFA eligibility rules; some limited exceptions apply. Players may hold more than one non-FIFA nationality.

| No. | Pos. | Nation | Player |
|---|---|---|---|
| — | MF | NED | Joey Sleegers (from Free Agent) |
| — | FW | NGR | Issa Adekunle (loan return from 1. FC Tatran Prešov) |
| — | MF | NED | Philippe van Arnhem (from (Netherlands) RKC Waalwijk) |
| — | MF | SVK | Jakub Kadák (from AS Trenčín youth) |
| — | DF | SVK | Marián Pišoja (from AS Trenčín youth) |
| — | MF | NED | Imran Oulad Omar (from (Netherlands) Achilles '29) |

Out: Note: Flags indicate national team as defined under FIFA eligibility rules; some limited exceptions apply. Players may hold more than one non-FIFA nationality.

| No. | Pos. | Nation | Player |
|---|---|---|---|
| — | FW | CUW | Rangelo Janga (to (Belgium) K.A.A. Gent) |
| — | MF | NED | Ricky van Haaren (to ŠK Slovan Bratislava) |
| — | DF | SVK | Tomáš Šalata (on loan to FK Inter Bratislava) |
| — | FW | NGR | Issa Adekunle (on loan to FK Inter Bratislava) |
| — | DF | NED | Rodney Klooster (on loan to (Netherlands) FC Eindhoven) |
| — | MF | SVK | Adam Brenkus (to MFK Ružomberok) |
| — | MF | SVK | Filip Halgoš (on loan to MFK Tatran Liptovský Mikuláš) |

=== FC Nitra ===
In: Note: Flags indicate national team as defined under FIFA eligibility rules; some limited exceptions apply. Players may hold more than one non-FIFA nationality.

| No. | Pos. | Nation | Player |
|---|---|---|---|
| — | FW | SVK | Tomáš Vestenický (on loan from (Poland) KS Cracovia) |
| — | FW | ARM | Vahagn Militosyan (from KFC Komárno) |
| — | DF | SVK | Pavol Farkaš (from Free Agent) |

Out: Note: Flags indicate national team as defined under FIFA eligibility rules; some limited exceptions apply. Players may hold more than one non-FIFA nationality.

| No. | Pos. | Nation | Player |
|---|---|---|---|
| — | FW | SVK | Filip Balaj (to MŠK Žilina) |
| — | GK | SVK | Dušan Kolmokov (End of professional career) |
| — | DF | SVK | Samuel Ďurek (to TBA) |
| — | MF | SVK | Patrik Šurnovský (to TBA) |

=== FC ViOn Zlaté Moravce ===
In: Note: Flags indicate national team as defined under FIFA eligibility rules; some limited exceptions apply. Players may hold more than one non-FIFA nationality.

| No. | Pos. | Nation | Player |
|---|---|---|---|
| — | MF | CZE | Robert Bartolomeu (on loan from (Czech Republic) FC Fastav Zlín) |
| — | GK | GEO | Giorgi Chochishvili (on loan from (Czech Republic) SK Slavia Prague juniori) |
| — | MF | SVK | Marek Rigo (on loan from ŠK Slovan Bratislava) |
| — | DF | SVK | Juraj Kotula (on loan from ŠK Slovan Bratislava) |
| — | FW | CZE | Ondřej Šašinka (on loan from (Czech Republic) FC Baník Ostrava) |
| — | MF | SVK | Denis Duga (from FK Senica) |
| — | FW | BIH | Haris Harba (from (Turkey) Büyükşehir Belediye Erzurumspor) |

Out: Note: Flags indicate national team as defined under FIFA eligibility rules; some limited exceptions apply. Players may hold more than one non-FIFA nationality.

| No. | Pos. | Nation | Player |
|---|---|---|---|
| — | DF | SVK | Timotej Záhumenský (to FC DAC 1904 Dunajská Streda) |
| — | DF | SVK | Martin Dobrotka (to (Poland) Stal Mielec) |
| — | MF | POL | Dawid Szymonowicz (loan return to (Poland) Jagiellonia Białystok) |
| — | FW | BRA | Baggio (Released) |
| — | FW | BRA | Renan (Released) |
| — | FW | SVK | Peter Sládek (loan return to (Poland) Podbeskidzie Bielsko-Biała) |
| — | FW | SVK | Róbert Gešnábel (to MFK Ružomberok) |
| — | DF | SVK | Adam Jamrich (on loan to MFK Lokomotíva Zvolen) |
| — | MF | SVK | Erik Ujlaky (to (Austria) FCM Traiskirchen) |

=== MFK Zemplín Michalovce ===
In: Note: Flags indicate national team as defined under FIFA eligibility rules; some limited exceptions apply. Players may hold more than one non-FIFA nationality.

| No. | Pos. | Nation | Player |
|---|---|---|---|
| — | FW | POL | Dawid Kurminowski (on loan from (Poland) Lech Poznań) |
| — | FW | SVK | Filip Serečin (loan return from FC Lokomotíva Košice) |
| — | MF | SVK | Róbert Kovaľ (on loan from (Czech Republic) FK Dukla Prague) |
| — | MF | JPN | Tsubasa Nishi (on loan from (Poland) Legia Warsaw II) |
| — | FW | LTU | Eligijus Jankauskas (on loan from MŠK Žilina) |
| — | MF | SVK | Matúš Begala (from MFK Zemplín Michalovce youth) |
| — | MF | ARM | Hovhannes Harutyunyan (from (Armenia) FC Ararat-Moskva Yerevan) |
| — | DF | RUS | Sergei Shumeyko (from Free Agent) |

Out: Note: Flags indicate national team as defined under FIFA eligibility rules; some limited exceptions apply. Players may hold more than one non-FIFA nationality.

| No. | Pos. | Nation | Player |
|---|---|---|---|
| — | MF | SVK | Miroslav Božok (End of professional career) |
| — | DF | BLR | Aleksandr Sverchinskiy (to (Belarus) FC Minsk) |
| — | MF | SVK | Jakub Grič (to (Poland) Sandecja Nowy Sącz) |
| — | FW | ALB | Kristian Kushta (loan return to (Greece) PAOK FC) |

=== FK Železiarne Podbrezová ===
In: Note: Flags indicate national team as defined under FIFA eligibility rules; some limited exceptions apply. Players may hold more than one non-FIFA nationality.

| No. | Pos. | Nation | Player |
|---|---|---|---|
| — | MF | CRO | Stijepo Njire (from (Czech Republic) 1. SC Znojmo) |
| — | FW | UKR | Illia Tereshchenko (on loan from ŠK Slovan Bratislava) |
| — | FW | POL | Jakub Więzik (from 1. FC Tatran Prešov) |
| — | GK | SRB | Marko Drobnjak (from (Serbia) FK Polet Ljubić) |
| — | DF | SVK | Alexander Mojžiš (from FK Železiarne Podbrezová youth) |
| — | MF | SVK | Viktor Mojžiš (from FK Železiarne Podbrezová youth) |

Out: Note: Flags indicate national team as defined under FIFA eligibility rules; some limited exceptions apply. Players may hold more than one non-FIFA nationality.

| No. | Pos. | Nation | Player |
|---|---|---|---|
| — | GK | SVK | Patrik Lukáč (to 1. FC Tatran Prešov) |
| — | DF | SVK | Jaroslav Kostelný (to TBA) |
| — | MF | SVK | Kamil Kuzma (to TBA) |
| — | MF | SVK | Martin Válovčan (to TBA) |
| — | DF | SVK | Ľuboš Kupčík (to FK Železiarne Podbrezová II) |
| — | MF | SVK | Tomáš Gerát (to FK Železiarne Podbrezová II) |
| — | DF | SVK | Lukáš Migaľa (to FK Železiarne Podbrezová II) |
| — | FW | SVK | Andrej Rendla (End of professional career due to health problems) |

=== 1. FC Tatran Prešov ===
In: Note: Flags indicate national team as defined under FIFA eligibility rules; some limited exceptions apply. Players may hold more than one non-FIFA nationality.

| No. | Pos. | Nation | Player |
|---|---|---|---|
| — | FW | CRO | Nikola Gatarić (from (Slovenia) NK Celje) |
| — | GK | SVK | Patrik Lukáč (from FK Železiarne Podbrezová) |
| — | DF | SVK | Patrik Prikryl (on loan from FK Pohronie) |
| — | MF | SVK | Adrián Leško (on loan from MFK Zemplín Michalovce) |
| — | FW | CZE | Petr Hošek (from (Czech Republic) FK Fotbal Třinec) |
| — | MF | MKD | Kristijan Trapanovski (on loan from (Czech Republic) SK Slavia Prague U21) |

Out: Note: Flags indicate national team as defined under FIFA eligibility rules; some limited exceptions apply. Players may hold more than one non-FIFA nationality.

| No. | Pos. | Nation | Player |
|---|---|---|---|
| — | DF | SVK | Juraj Hovančík (to FC Lokomotíva Košice) |
| — | FW | POL | Jakub Więzik (Released and joined FK Železiarne Podbrezová) |
| — | FW | NGR | Hector Tubonemi (Released) |
| — | DF | UKR | Oleksiy Milyutin (Released) |
| — | FW | SVK | Mojmír Trebuňák (Released) |
| — | MF | SVK | András Lénárt (loan return to (Hungary) Videoton FC) |
| — | DF | SVK | Patrik Jacko (Released nad joined FK Pohronie) |
| — | FW | NGR | Issa Adekunle (loan return to AS Trenčín) |
| — | FW | SVK | Roland Černák (loan return to FC DAC 1904 Dunajská Streda) |

=== FK Senica ===
In: Note: Flags indicate national team as defined under FIFA eligibility rules; some limited exceptions apply. Players may hold more than one non-FIFA nationality.

| No. | Pos. | Nation | Player |
|---|---|---|---|
| — | MF | SVK | Matej Kosorín (loan return from AFC Nové Mesto nad Váhom) |
| — | FW | VEN | Ronaldo Chacón (on loan from (Venezuela) Caracas FC) |
| — | FW | VEN | Richard Celis (on loan from (Venezuela) Deportivo JBL del Zulia) |
| — | FW | COL | Diego Cuadros (on loan from (Colombia) Jaguares de Córdoba) |
| — | FW | COL | Frank Castañeda (on loan from (Colombia) Orsomarso S.C.) |
| — | MF | SVK | Jakub Brašeň (from (Hungary) Mezőkövesdi SE) |
| — | FW | SVK | Peter Ďungel (on loan from FK Pohronie) |
| — | DF | COL | Joan Herrera (from Free Agent) |
| — | GK | SVK | Dominik Holec (on loan from MŠK Žilina B) |
| — | MF | GBS | Zezinho (from Free Agent) |
| — | MF | CZE | Jan Suchan (on loan from (Czech Republic) Viktoria Plzeň) |
| — | DF | COL | Ricardo Villarraga (on loan from (Colombia) Atlético Huila) |
| — | DF | CZE | Jurij Medveděv (on loan from ŠK Slovan Bratislava) |
| — | DF | SVK | Oliver Práznovský (from Free agent) |
| — | FW | FRA | Lynel Kitambala (from Free Agent) |

Out: Note: Flags indicate national team as defined under FIFA eligibility rules; some limited exceptions apply. Players may hold more than one non-FIFA nationality.

| No. | Pos. | Nation | Player |
|---|---|---|---|
| — | GK | SVK | Michal Šulla (to ŠK Slovan Bratislava) |
| — | GK | SVK | František Plach (to (Poland) Piast Gliwice) |
| — | MF | SVK | Marek Rigo (loan return to ŠK Slovan Bratislava) |
| — | DF | CZE | Jurij Medveděv (to ŠK Slovan Bratislava) |
| — | FW | BRA | Rômulo Silva (loan return to Partizán Bardejov) |
| — | MF | NGR | Pentecos (loan return to FK Inter Bratislava) |
| — | MF | SVK | Dominik Malý (loan return to ŠK Slovan Bratislava II) |
| — | FW | SVK | Filip Ďuriš (loan return to ŠK Slovan Bratislava) |
| — | FW | SVK | Jakub Reľovský (loan return to MFK Stará Ľubovňa) |
| — | FW | CZE | Dominik Smékal (loan return to (Czech Republic) FC Baník Ostrava) |
| — | DF | SVK | Marián Jarabica (to TBA) |
| — | MF | SVK | Denis Duga (to FC ViOn Zlaté Moravce) |
| — | DF | SVK | Martin Červeňák (to TBA) |
| — | DF | ISR | Amir Ben-Shimon (to TBA) |

== 2. liga ==
=== MFK Skalica ===
In: Note: Flags indicate national team as defined under FIFA eligibility rules; some limited exceptions apply. Players may hold more than one non-FIFA nationality.

| No. | Pos. | Nation | Player |
|---|---|---|---|
| — | FW | SVK | Jozef Dolný (from (Republic of Ireland) Derry City F.C.) |
| — | DF | SVK | Ladislav Szöcs (from (Hungary) Gyirmót SE) |
| — | FW | SVK | Jozef Sombat (from MFK Lokomotíva Zvolen) |
| — | FW | SVK | Tomáš Majtán (from (Hungary) Mezőkövesdi SE) |
| — | GK | SVK | Martin Junas (loan return from (Czech Republic) MSK Břeclav) |

Out: Note: Flags indicate national team as defined under FIFA eligibility rules; some limited exceptions apply. Players may hold more than one non-FIFA nationality.

| No. | Pos. | Nation | Player |
|---|---|---|---|
| — | FW | SVK | Ľubomír Ulrich (Released and joined ŠKF Sereď) |
| — | MF | SVK | Dominik Fukna (loan return to Spartak Myjava) |
| — | DF | SVK | Peter Jánošík (Released) |
| — | MF | CZE | Ondřej Čtvrtníček (Released and joined Veľké Ludince) |
| — | MF | SVK | Lukáš Hruška (on loan to ŠK Odeva Lipany) |
| — | MF | SVK | Mário Vrábel (to (Czech Republic) Sokol Lanžhot) |

=== ŠKF Sereď ===
In: Note: Flags indicate national team as defined under FIFA eligibility rules; some limited exceptions apply. Players may hold more than one non-FIFA nationality.

| No. | Pos. | Nation | Player |
|---|---|---|---|
| — | FW | SVK | Ľubomír Ulrich (from MFK Skalica) |
| — | GK | SVK | Pavol Penksa (from (Scotland) Raith Rovers F.C.) |
| — | MF | NGR | Bankole Adekuoroye (from FK Spišská Nová Ves) |
| — | MF | SVK | Lukáš Mihálik (on loan from FC Spartak Trnava) |
| — | FW | SRB | Saša Popin (from Free Agent) |
| — | MF | AUT | Scherif Ali El Razek (from (Egypt) El-Entag El-Harby SC) |

Out: Note: Flags indicate national team as defined under FIFA eligibility rules; some limited exceptions apply. Players may hold more than one non-FIFA nationality.

| No. | Pos. | Nation | Player |
|---|---|---|---|
| — | FW | SRB | Marko Milunović (End of career) |
| — | MF | SVK | Ádam Mészáros (to KFC Komárno) |
| — | MF | SVK | Norbert Jankto (to (Austria) SC Herzogenburg - Startseite) |
| — | MF | MKD | Dejan Peševski (to TBA) |
| — | GK | SVK | Andrej Maťašovský (to KFC Komárno) |

=== FC Lokomotíva Košice ===
In: Note: Flags indicate national team as defined under FIFA eligibility rules; some limited exceptions apply. Players may hold more than one non-FIFA nationality.

| No. | Pos. | Nation | Player |
|---|---|---|---|
| — | DF | SVK | Juraj Hovančík (from 1. FC Tatran Prešov) |
| — | MF | SVK | Michal Grohoľ (from Partizán Bardejov) |
| — | MF | SVK | Ladislav Hirjak (on loan from ŠK Novohrad Lučenec) |
| — | FW | SVK | Róbert Jano (from (Hungary) Gyirmót SE) |
| — | DF | SVK | Tomáš Martoňák (from FC Lokomotíva Košice youth) |
| — | MF | SVK | Peter Terpaj (from FC Lokomotíva Košice youth) |

Out: Note: Flags indicate national team as defined under FIFA eligibility rules; some limited exceptions apply. Players may hold more than one non-FIFA nationality.

| No. | Pos. | Nation | Player |
|---|---|---|---|
| — | FW | SVK | Filip Serečin (loan return to MFK Zemplín Michalovce) |
| — | FW | CMR | Joel Tata Nsah (Released) |
| — | DF | SVK | Lukáš Horváth (to FK Poprad) |
| — | MF | SVK | František Vancák (to TJ FK Vyšné Opátske) |
| — | MF | SVK | Jakub Straka (on loan to MFK Vranov nad Topľou) |
| — | FW | SVK | Michal Beli (on loan to FK Kechnec) |
| — | DF | SVK | Róbert Dický (to (Austria) SV Horn) |

=== MŠK Žilina B ===
In: Note: Flags indicate national team as defined under FIFA eligibility rules; some limited exceptions apply. Players may hold more than one non-FIFA nationality.

| No. | Pos. | Nation | Player |

Out: Note: Flags indicate national team as defined under FIFA eligibility rules; some limited exceptions apply. Players may hold more than one non-FIFA nationality.

| No. | Pos. | Nation | Player |
|---|---|---|---|
| — | GK | SVK | Dominik Holec (on loan to FK Senica) |

=== FK Poprad ===
In: Note: Flags indicate national team as defined under FIFA eligibility rules; some limited exceptions apply. Players may hold more than one non-FIFA nationality.

| No. | Pos. | Nation | Player |
|---|---|---|---|
| — | DF | SVK | Lukáš Horváth (from FC Lokomotíva Košice) |
| — | MF | SVK | Štefan Zošák (from (Kazakhstan) FC Shakhter Karagandy) |

Out: Note: Flags indicate national team as defined under FIFA eligibility rules; some limited exceptions apply. Players may hold more than one non-FIFA nationality.

| No. | Pos. | Nation | Player |
|---|---|---|---|
| — | DF | SVK | Marián Ferenc (Released and joined FK Spišská Nová Ves) |
| — | MF | SVK | Marko Lukáč (on loan to FK Pohronie) |
| — | FW | SVK | Daniel Dubec (to (Austria) FCM Traiskirchen) |

=== FK Spišská Nová Ves ===
In: Note: Flags indicate national team as defined under FIFA eligibility rules; some limited exceptions apply. Players may hold more than one non-FIFA nationality.

| No. | Pos. | Nation | Player |
|---|---|---|---|
| — | DF | SVK | Marián Ferenc (from Free Agent) |
| — | GK | SVK | Tibor Hirko (from FK Čaňa) |
| — | DF | NGR | Celestine Lazarus (on loan from MFK Zemplín Michalovce) |
| — | MF | SVK | Matúš Otruba (from MFK Tatran Liptovský Mikuláš) |
| — | MF | SVK | Erik Martinko (from FC Spartak Trnava II) |
| — | FW | UKR | Vladyslav Mazur (from FTC Fiľakovo) |
| — | MF | SVK | Adrián Majko (from FK Spišská Nová Ves youth) |
| — | MF | SVK | Matej Augustín (from FK Spišská Nová Ves youth) |
| — | MF | SVK | Dávid Pavlovský (from FK Spišská Nová Ves youth) |

Out: Note: Flags indicate national team as defined under FIFA eligibility rules; some limited exceptions apply. Players may hold more than one non-FIFA nationality.

| No. | Pos. | Nation | Player |
|---|---|---|---|
| — | MF | NGR | Bankole Adekuoroye (to ŠKF Sereď) |
| — | MF | SVK | Tomáš Kubík (to (Austria) SC Bad Sauerbrunn) |
| — | MF | NGR | Wisdom Kanu (to FK Inter Bratislava) |
| — | FW | SVK | Lukáš Kubus (to (Austria) ASV Siegendorf) |
| — | DF | SRB | Aleksa Matić (to (Serbia) FK Budućnost Dobanovci) |
| — | FW | BRA | Weriton Luiz Gutierre (Released and joined (Brazil) Cuiabá Esporte Clube) |
| — | DF | UKR | Roman Botvynnyk (to (Poland) Karpaty Krosno) |
| — | MF | SVK | Peter Vantroba (to (Austria) SV Sierning) |

=== MFK Tatran Liptovský Mikuláš ===
In: Note: Flags indicate national team as defined under FIFA eligibility rules; some limited exceptions apply. Players may hold more than one non-FIFA nationality.

| No. | Pos. | Nation | Player |
|---|---|---|---|
| — | MF | SVK | Filip Halgoš (on loan from AS Trenčín) |
| — | FW | SVK | Pavol Bellás (on loan from MFK Zemplín Michalovce) |
| — | MF | SVK | Denis Čery (on loan from FC Nitra) |

Out: Note: Flags indicate national team as defined under FIFA eligibility rules; some limited exceptions apply. Players may hold more than one non-FIFA nationality.

| No. | Pos. | Nation | Player |
|---|---|---|---|
| — | DF | SVK | Lukáš Ondrek (loan return to MFK Ružomberok) |

=== Partizán Bardejov ===
In: Note: Flags indicate national team as defined under FIFA eligibility rules; some limited exceptions apply. Players may hold more than one non-FIFA nationality.

| No. | Pos. | Nation | Player |
|---|---|---|---|
| — | FW | BRA | Rômulo Silva (loan return from FK Senica) |
| — | MF | BLR | Syarhey Hlyabko (from (Belarus) FC Torpedo Minsk) |
| — | DF | SLO | Ben Gasser (from (Croatia) NK Pazinka) |
| — | MF | RSA | Mkhanyiseli Siwahla (from (Poland) KS Proch Pionki) |
| — | MF | HAI | Emmanuel Sarki (from Free Agent) |
| — | DF | SVK | Dominik Lukáč (on loan from 1. FC Tatran Prešov) |

Out: Note: Flags indicate national team as defined under FIFA eligibility rules; some limited exceptions apply. Players may hold more than one non-FIFA nationality.

| No. | Pos. | Nation | Player |
|---|---|---|---|
| — | MF | SVK | Michal Grohoľ (to FC Lokomotíva Košice) |
| — | MF | SVK | Ľubomír Ivanko-Macej (to TBD) |
| — | MF | BLR | Valery Potorocha (Released) |
| — | DF | SVK | Vladimír Staš (to End of contract) |
| — | MF | POL | Szymon Gruca (Released) |

=== MFK Lokomotíva Zvolen ===
In: Note: Flags indicate national team as defined under FIFA eligibility rules; some limited exceptions apply. Players may hold more than one non-FIFA nationality.

| No. | Pos. | Nation | Player |
|---|---|---|---|
| — | DF | SVK | Adam Jamrich (on loan from FC ViOn Zlaté Moravce) |
| — | DF | SVK | Raymundo Hamšík (from (Czech Republic) MFK Frýdek-Místek) |
| — | FW | NGR | Hector Tubonemi (on loan from 1. FC Tatran Prešov) |

Out: Note: Flags indicate national team as defined under FIFA eligibility rules; some limited exceptions apply. Players may hold more than one non-FIFA nationality.

| No. | Pos. | Nation | Player |
|---|---|---|---|
| — | GK | SVK | Tomáš Jenčo (to FK Pohronie) |
| — | FW | SVK | Jozef Sombat (to MFK Skalica) |
| — | FW | SVK | Tomáš Mikinič (to (Poland) Odra Opole) |
| — | MF | SVK | Miroslav Hrebík (to (Austria) SK St. Johann) |
| — | MF | CRO | Luka Pejović (to (Germany) PSV Stukenbrock-Senne) |
| — | DF | SVK | Nikolas Včelka (loan return to (Czech Republic) FC Vysočina Jihlava U21) |
| — | DF | SVK | Filip Deket (on loan to Spartak Trnava II) |
| — | MF | SVK | Denis Čery (loan return to FC Nitra) |

=== FK Pohronie ===
In: Note: Flags indicate national team as defined under FIFA eligibility rules; some limited exceptions apply. Players may hold more than one non-FIFA nationality.

| No. | Pos. | Nation | Player |
|---|---|---|---|
| — | GK | SVK | Tomáš Jenčo (from MFK Lokomotíva Zvolen) |
| — | DF | SVK | Marek Bartoš (from OFK Dunajská Lužná) |
| — | FW | POL | Daniel Skiba (from TBD) |
| — | FW | SVK | Marko Lukáč (on loan from FK Poprad) |
| — | MF | SVK | Jozef Rejdovian (from (Austria) SC-ESV Parndorf 1919) |
| — | DF | SVK | Lukáš Tesák (from (Belarus) FC Gomel) |
| — | DF | SVK | Patrik Jacko (from Free Agent) |
| — | FW | SRB | Uroš Tomović (from TBD) |
| — | FW | POL | Marián Kovařík (from (Czech Republic) MFK Frýdek-Místek) |
| — | GK | SVK | Matej Repiský (from FK Pohronie youth) |
| — | MF | SVK | Matúš Antošík (from FK Pohronie youth) |
| — | MF | SVK | Andrej Urgela (from FK Pohronie youth) |

Out: Note: Flags indicate national team as defined under FIFA eligibility rules; some limited exceptions apply. Players may hold more than one non-FIFA nationality.

| No. | Pos. | Nation | Player |
|---|---|---|---|
| — | FW | SVK | Samuel Lipták (loan return to FK Poprad) |
| — | FW | SVK | Erik Nepšinský (to Železiarne Podbrezová B) |
| — | MF | SVK | Daniel Hudák (to TBA) |
| — | DF | SVK | Jozef Sekereš (Retired) |
| — | GK | SVK | Lukáš Urminský (to MFK Ružomberok) |
| — | DF | SVK | Lukáš Garaj (to TBA) |
| — | FW | SVK | Peter Ďungel (on loan to FK Senica) |
| — | FW | SRB | Samir Nurković (to TBA) |
| — | DF | SVK | Patrik Prikryl (on loan to 1. FC Tatran Prešov) |

=== FC ŠTK 1914 Šamorín ===
In: Note: Flags indicate national team as defined under FIFA eligibility rules; some limited exceptions apply. Players may hold more than one non-FIFA nationality.

| No. | Pos. | Nation | Player |
|---|---|---|---|
| — | FW | BRA | Matheus Pato (on loan from (Brazil) Fluminense FC) |
| — | FW | BRA | Christian (on loan from (Brazil) Fluminense FC) |
| — | MF | BRA | Matheus Saturnino (on loan from (Brazil) Fluminense FC) |
| — | FW | BRA | Evanilson (on loan from (Brazil) Fluminense FC) |
| — | DF | SVK | Jakub Čunta (from Free Agent) |
| — | DF | SVK | Zoltán Ágh (from (Hungary) Soproni VSE) |
| — | DF | ESP | Iker Berruezo (from (Lithuania) FK Utenis Utena) |

Out: Note: Flags indicate national team as defined under FIFA eligibility rules; some limited exceptions apply. Players may hold more than one non-FIFA nationality.

| No. | Pos. | Nation | Player |
|---|---|---|---|
| — | MF | ARG | Leonel (loan return to (Brazil) Fluminense FC) |
| — | DF | BRA | Breno (loan return to (Brazil) Fluminense FC) |
| — | FW | BRA | Gustavo Schutz (loan return to (Brazil) Fluminense FC) |
| — | DF | SVK | Csaba Horváth (End of career) |

=== FK Slavoj Trebišov ===
In: Note: Flags indicate national team as defined under FIFA eligibility rules; some limited exceptions apply. Players may hold more than one non-FIFA nationality.

| No. | Pos. | Nation | Player |
|---|---|---|---|
| — | FW | SVK | Ján Novák (from FK Iskra Borčice) |
| — | FW | GRE | Romario Cekaj (from (Greece) Iraklis) |
| — | DF | ALB | Lazarus Rota (from (Greece) Iraklis) |

Out: Note: Flags indicate national team as defined under FIFA eligibility rules; some limited exceptions apply. Players may hold more than one non-FIFA nationality.

| No. | Pos. | Nation | Player |
|---|---|---|---|
| — | DF | SVK | Dominik Lukáč (loan return to 1. FC Tatran Prešov) |
| — | FW | SVK | Pavol Bellás (loan return to MFK Zemplín Michalovce) |

=== AFC Nové Mesto nad Váhom ===
In: Note: Flags indicate national team as defined under FIFA eligibility rules; some limited exceptions apply. Players may hold more than one non-FIFA nationality.

| No. | Pos. | Nation | Player |
|---|---|---|---|
| — | MF | COL | Naren Solano (from (Colombia) Independiente Medellín) |
| — | MF | SVK | Martin Svatík (from (Czech Republic) Vysočina Jihlava U21) |
| — | FW | SVK | Daniel Rapavý (from (Czech Republic) TJ Valašské Meziříčí) |
| — | FW | SVK | Erik Miklovič (on loan from TJ Spartak Horná Streda) |
| — | MF | SVK | Oliver Hornáček (from Spartak Myjava) |
| — | DF | SVK | Jakub Kosorin (on loan from FC DAC 1904 Dunajská Streda) |

Out: Note: Flags indicate national team as defined under FIFA eligibility rules; some limited exceptions apply. Players may hold more than one non-FIFA nationality.

| No. | Pos. | Nation | Player |
|---|---|---|---|
| — | MF | SVK | Juraj Beňo (Released) |
| — | FW | SVK | Radoslav Ďanovský (Released) |
| — | DF | SVK | Michal Živčic (to ŠK LR Crystal Lednické Rovne) |
| — | DF | SVK | Lukáš Beňo (to FK Dubnica) |
| — | FW | SVK | Ján Gríger (Released) |

=== FK Inter Bratislava ===
In: Note: Flags indicate national team as defined under FIFA eligibility rules; some limited exceptions apply. Players may hold more than one non-FIFA nationality.

| No. | Pos. | Nation | Player |
|---|---|---|---|
| — | MF | NGR | Pentecos (loan return from FK Senica) |
| — | DF | SVK | Tomáš Šalata (on loan from AS Trenčín) |
| — | FW | NGR | Issa Adekunle (on loan from AS Trenčín) |
| — | MF | NGR | Wisdom Kanu (from FK Spišská Nová Ves) |
| — | MF | NGR | Stanley Oganbor (from (Nigeria) Lagos Islanders) |
| — | FW | NGR | Victor Olatunji (from (Nigeria) Lagos Islanders) |
| — | GK | CZE | Martin Pastornický (from (Czech Republic) MFK Karviná) |
| — | DF | ISR | Amir Ben-Shimon (on loan from FK Senica) |

Out: Note: Flags indicate national team as defined under FIFA eligibility rules; some limited exceptions apply. Players may hold more than one non-FIFA nationality.

| No. | Pos. | Nation | Player |
|---|---|---|---|
| — | MF | SVK | Viktor Tóth (Released) |
| — | DF | SVK | Matej Vaculík (to TBA) |
| — | MF | SVK | Andrej Kaman (to TBA) |
| — | FW | CRO | Armando Mance (Released) |
| — | GK | SVK | Kristián Strelčík (Released) |
| — | MF | NGR | Pentecos (Released) |

=== KFC Komárno ===
In: Note: Flags indicate national team as defined under FIFA eligibility rules; some limited exceptions apply. Players may hold more than one non-FIFA nationality.

| No. | Pos. | Nation | Player |
|---|---|---|---|
| — | MF | SVK | Ádam Mészáros (from ŠKF Sereď) |
| — | GK | SVK | Andrej Maťašovský (from ŠKF Sereď) |
| — | FW | SVK | Gergö Kelemen (from ŠK Novohrad Lučenec) |
| — | FW | SRB | Mihajlo Popović (from (Austria) ATSV Stadl-Paura) |
| — | DF | SVK | Dominik Špiriak (on loan from FC DAC 1904 Dunajská Streda) |
| — | MF | SVK | Kristóf Domonkos (on loan from FC DAC 1904 Dunajská Streda) |
| — | FW | SVK | András Mészáros (on loan from FC DAC 1904 Dunajská Streda) |

Out: Note: Flags indicate national team as defined under FIFA eligibility rules; some limited exceptions apply. Players may hold more than one non-FIFA nationality.

| No. | Pos. | Nation | Player |
|---|---|---|---|
| — | FW | ARM | Vahagn Militosyan (to FC Nitra) |

=== FK Železiarne Podbrezová B ===
In: Note: Flags indicate national team as defined under FIFA eligibility rules; some limited exceptions apply. Players may hold more than one non-FIFA nationality.

| No. | Pos. | Nation | Player |

Out: Note: Flags indicate national team as defined under FIFA eligibility rules; some limited exceptions apply. Players may hold more than one non-FIFA nationality.

| No. | Pos. | Nation | Player |
|---|---|---|---|
| — | MF | SVK | Kristián Lukáčik (to (Spain) Atlético Saguntino) |

03000
