= List of Slovak football transfers summer 2018 =

Notable Slovak football transfers in the summer transfer window 2018 by club. Only transfers of the Fortuna Liga is included.

== Fortuna Liga ==
=== FC Spartak Trnava ===
In: Note: Flags indicate national team as defined under FIFA eligibility rules; some limited exceptions apply. Players may hold more than one non-FIFA nationality.

| No. | Pos. | Nation | Player |
|---|---|---|---|
| — | GK | SVK | Dobrivoj Rusov (free agent) |
| — | MF | SVK | Erik Grendel (from (Poland) Górnik Zabrze) |
| — | MF | AUT | Fabian Miesenböck (from (Austria) Wiener Neustadt) |
| — | MF | CZE | Jakub Rada (on loan from (Czech Republic) Mladá Boleslav) |
| — | MF | SVK | Lukáš Mihálik (loan return from Sereď) |
| — | FW | BIH | Senad Jarović (from (Slovenia) Domžale) |
| — | FW | CRO | Filip Dangubić (from (Croatia) Rijeka) |
| — | DF | SVK | Lukáš Lupták (from FK Senica) |
| — | FW | SVK | Marek Bakoš (on loan from (Czech Republic) Viktoria Plzeň) |
| — | MF | POL | Patryk Małecki (on loan from (Poland) Wisła Kraków) |
| — | MF | CZE | Jiří Kulhánek (on loan from (Czech Republic) Sparta Prague) |
| — | MF | GEO | Davit Skhirtladze (from (Denmark) Silkeborg IF) |
| — | FW | IRN | Ali Ghorbani (from (Iran) Esteghlal) |

Out: Note: Flags indicate national team as defined under FIFA eligibility rules; some limited exceptions apply. Players may hold more than one non-FIFA nationality.

| No. | Pos. | Nation | Player |
|---|---|---|---|
| — | GK | SVK | Martin Vantruba (loan return to (Czech Republic) SK Slavia Prague) |
| — | DF | BIH | Eldar Ćivić (loan return to (Czech Republic) AC Sparta Prague) |
| — | MF | AUT | Yasin Pehlivan (End of contract and joined (Turkey) Gençlerbirliği) |
| — | MF | GER | Reagy Ofosu (End of contract and joined (Hungary) Haladás) |
| — | MF | UKR | Illya Cherednychenko (Released and joined FC Nitra) |
| — | MF | SVK | Ján Vlasko (to (Hungary) Puskás Akadémia) |
| — | MF | SVK | Lukáš Mihálik (on loan to Lokomotíva Košice) |
| — | FW | MKD | Stefan Bogdanovski (Released and joined ŠKF Sereď) |
| — | FW | AUT | Marvin Egho (to (Denmark) Randers FC) |

=== ŠK Slovan Bratislava ===
In: Note: Flags indicate national team as defined under FIFA eligibility rules; some limited exceptions apply. Players may hold more than one non-FIFA nationality.

| No. | Pos. | Nation | Player |
|---|---|---|---|
| — | DF | CZE | Jurij Medveděv (loan return from FK Senica) |
| — | GK | SVK | Matúš Ružinský (from ŠKF Sereď) |
| — | FW | SRB | Dejan Dražić (from (Spain) Celta de Vigo) |
| — | DF | NED | Mitch Apau (from (Slovenia) NK Olimpija Ljubljana) |
| — | MF | CRO | Marin Ljubičić (from FC DAC 1904 Dunajská Streda) |

Out: Note: Flags indicate national team as defined under FIFA eligibility rules; some limited exceptions apply. Players may hold more than one non-FIFA nationality.

| No. | Pos. | Nation | Player |
|---|---|---|---|
| — | FW | SVK | Filip Oršula (Released and joined (Czech Republic) FC Slovan Liberec) |
| — | DF | GRE | Diamantis Chouchoumis (Released and joined (Serbia) FK Vojvodina) |
| — | MF | CZE | Lukáš Droppa (Released and joined (Kazakhstan) FC Shakhter Karagandy) |
| — | GK | SVK | Frederik Valach (Released) |
| — | DF | SVK | Boris Sekulić (to (Bulgaria) CSKA Sofia) |
| — | DF | SVK | Erik Čikoš (Released and joined (Hungary) Debreceni VSC) |
| — | FW | SVK | Róbert Vittek (End of contract) |

=== FC DAC 1904 Dunajská Streda ===
In: Note: Flags indicate national team as defined under FIFA eligibility rules; some limited exceptions apply. Players may hold more than one non-FIFA nationality.

| No. | Pos. | Nation | Player |
|---|---|---|---|
| — | DF | SVK | Milan Šimčák (from MFK Zemplín Michalovce) |
| — | MF | UKR | Maksym Tretyakov (from (Ukraine) FC Chornomorets Odesa) |
| — | GK | SVK | Adrián Slančík (from 1. FC Tatran Prešov) |
| — | MF | HUN | Zsolt Kalmár (from (Germany) RB Leipzig) |
| — | MF | HUN | Máté Vida (from (Hungary) Vasas SC) |
| — | DF | SVK | Dominik Špiriak (loan return from KFC Komárno) |
| — | MF | SVK | Kristóf Domonkos (loan return from KFC Komárno) |
| — | MF | SVK | Denis Baumgartner (on loan from (Italy) Sampdoria) |
| — | DF | UKR | Danilo Beskorovayniy (from (Lithuania) FK Atlantas) |
| — | FW | UKR | Stanislav Bilenkyi (from (Ukraine) FC Olimpik Donetsk) |
| — | DF | SVK | Martin Bednár (from MFK Zemplín Michalovce) |

Out: Note: Flags indicate national team as defined under FIFA eligibility rules; some limited exceptions apply. Players may hold more than one non-FIFA nationality.

| No. | Pos. | Nation | Player |
|---|---|---|---|
| — | MF | HUN | Zsolt Kalmár (loan return to (Germany) RB Leipzig) |
| — | DF | SRB | Marko Živković (End of contract) |
| — | MF | CGO | Yves Pambou (End of contract - joined (Israel) Hapoel Petah Tikva F.C.) |
| — | MF | CMR | Noé Kwin (End of contract) |
| — | FW | HUN | Bence Mervó (Released and joined (Hungary) Győri ETO FC) |
| — | GK | SVK | Matej Slávik (Released) |
| — | MF | SVK | Zoltán Kontár (to (Hungary) Gyirmót FC Győr) |
| — | FW | SVK | Lukáš Čmelík (Released) |
| — | DF | UKR | Danilo Beskorovayniy (on loan to MFK Zemplín Michalovce) |
| 4 | MF | CRO | Marin Ljubičić (Released and joined ŠK Slovan Bratislava) |
| 8 | FW | SVK | Erik Pačinda (Released and joined (Czech Republic) FC Viktoria Plzeň) |

=== MŠK Žilina ===
In: Note: Flags indicate national team as defined under FIFA eligibility rules; some limited exceptions apply. Players may hold more than one non-FIFA nationality.

| No. | Pos. | Nation | Player |
|---|---|---|---|
| — | FW | NGA | Yusuf Otubanjo (loan return from (Austria) SC Rheindorf Altach) |
| — | MF | MDA | Eugeniu Cociuc (loan return from (Azerbaijan) Sabail FK) |
| — | MF | LTU | Eligijus Jankauskas (loan return from MFK Zemplín Michalovce) |
| — | GK | SVK | Dominik Holec (loan return from FK Senica) |
| — | DF | GEO | Giorgi Tevzadze (from (Georgia (country)) FC Dinamo Tbilisi) |
| — | MF | MKD | Enis Fazlagić (from (North Macedonia) KF Shkëndija) |
| — | DF | GHA | Benson Anang (from (Ghana) New Life Academy) |
| — | DF | AUS | Aleksandar Susnjar (on loan from (Czech Republic) FK Mladá Boleslav) |
| — | DF | SVK | Michal Tomič (on loan from (Italy) Sampdoria) |

Out: Note: Flags indicate national team as defined under FIFA eligibility rules; some limited exceptions apply. Players may hold more than one non-FIFA nationality.

| No. | Pos. | Nation | Player |
|---|---|---|---|
| — | FW | NGA | Yusuf Otubanjo (to (Austria) LASK Linz) |
| — | GK | CZE | Aleš Mandous (Released and joined (Czech Republic) SK Sigma Olomouc) |
| — | DF | SVK | Juraj Chvátal (loan return to (Czech Republic) AC Sparta Prague) |
| — | FW | SVK | Miloš Lačný (Released and joined (Georgia (country)) FC Torpedo Kutaisi) |
| — | DF | SVK | Tomáš Hučko (Released and joined ŠKF Sereď) |
| — | DF | SVK | Branislav Niňaj (Released and joined (Netherlands) Fortuna Sittard) |
| — | DF | SVK | Dávid Hancko (to (Italy) Fiorentina) |
| — | MF | SVK | František Kubík (Released and joined (Kazakhstan) FC Atyrau) |
| — | FW | SVK | Samuel Mráz (to (Italy) Empoli F.C.) |
| — | MF | MDA | Eugeniu Cociuc (Released and joined (Azerbaijan) Sabail FK) |
| — | MF | SVK | Michal Klec (on loan to (Czech Republic) FK Fotbal Třinec) |
| — | FW | SVK | Róbert Polievka (Released and joined FK Dukla Banská Bystrica) |
| — | MF | LTU | Eligijus Jankauskas (Released and joined (Czech Republic) SFC Opava) |

=== AS Trenčín ===
In: Note: Flags indicate national team as defined under FIFA eligibility rules; some limited exceptions apply. Players may hold more than one non-FIFA nationality.

| No. | Pos. | Nation | Player |
|---|---|---|---|
| — | FW | NGA | Emeka Umeh (from (Nigeria) Plateau United F.C.) |
| — | FW | NGA | Issa Adekunle (loan return from FK Inter Bratislava) |
| — | GK | UKR | Oleksandr Morgos (from (Ukraine) FC Rubikon Kyiv) |
| — | FW | GHA | Osman Bukari (from (Ghana) Accra Lions F.C.) |
| — | DF | NGA | Reuben Yem (from (Nigeria) GBS Football Academy) |
| — | DF | SVK | Adrián Slávik (from AS Trenčín youth) |
| — | MF | SVK | Tomáš Svečula (from AS Trenčín youth) |
| — | GK | SVK | Libor Hrdlička (from (Poland) Ruch Chorzów) |
| — | DF | SRB | Erhan Mašović (on loan from (Belgium) Club Brugge KV) |
| — | MF | BEL | Milan Corryn (on loan from (Belgium) R.S.C. Anderlecht) |
| — | FW | COD | Kule Mbombo (on loan from (Belgium) KFCO Beerschot Wilrijk) |
| — | FW | GHA | Mohamed Lamine (from (Ghana) Accra Lions FC) |

Out: Note: Flags indicate national team as defined under FIFA eligibility rules; some limited exceptions apply. Players may hold more than one non-FIFA nationality.

| No. | Pos. | Nation | Player |
|---|---|---|---|
| — | DF | SVK | Peter Čögley (Released and joined FC ViOn Zlaté Moravce) |
| — | FW | GEO | Giorgi Beridze (loan return to (Belgium) K.A.A. Gent) |
| — | GK | SVK | Adrián Chovan (on loan to FC ViOn Zlaté Moravce) |
| — | MF | NGA | Hilary Gong (to (Netherlands) SBV Vitesse) |
| — | MF | NGA | Ejike Okoh (Released) |
| — | DF | ENG | James Lawrence (to (Belgium) R.S.C. Anderlecht) |
| — | FW | NGA | Philip Azango (to (Belgium) K.A.A. Gent) |

=== MFK Ružomberok ===
In: Note: Flags indicate national team as defined under FIFA eligibility rules; some limited exceptions apply. Players may hold more than one non-FIFA nationality.

| No. | Pos. | Nation | Player |
|---|---|---|---|
| — | FW | BIH | Izzy Tandir (from (Czech Republic) MFK Frýdek-Místek) |
| — | MF | CZE | Filip Twardzik (from (Czech Republic) MFK Vítkovice) |
| — | DF | MKD | Yani Urdinov (from (Czech Republic) Bohemians 1905) |
| — | GK | CZE | Jan Čtvrtečka (on loan from (Czech Republic) AC Sparta Prague) |
| — | FW | SVK | Rastislav Kružliak (from MFK Ružomberok youth) |
| — | DF | SVK | Mário Mrva (from MFK Ružomberok youth) |
| — | FW | SVK | Viktor Jedinák (from FK Železiarne Podbrezová) |
| — | MF | BIH | Zinedin Mustedanagić (on loan from (Czech Republic) AC Sparta Prague) |
| — | MF | SVK | Timotej Múdry (from 1. FC Tatran Prešov) |

Out: Note: Flags indicate national team as defined under FIFA eligibility rules; some limited exceptions apply. Players may hold more than one non-FIFA nationality.

| No. | Pos. | Nation | Player |
|---|---|---|---|
| — | FW | BIH | Nermin Haskić (to (Serbia) Radnički Niš) |
| — | DF | EST | Artur Pikk (Released and joined (Poland) Miedź Legnica) |
| — | MF | SVK | Branislav Ľupták (Released and joined FC ViOn Zlaté Moravce) |
| — | DF | SVK | Jozef Menich (Released and joined ŠKF Sereď) |
| — | DF | SVK | Peter Maslo (Released and joined FK Poprad) |
| — | DF | SVK | Šimon Kupec (to (Poland) GKS Katowice) |
| — | FW | SVK | Róbert Gešnábel (Suspended due to suspicion of match fixing) |

=== FC Nitra ===
In: Note: Flags indicate national team as defined under FIFA eligibility rules; some limited exceptions apply. Players may hold more than one non-FIFA nationality.

| No. | Pos. | Nation | Player |
|---|---|---|---|
| — | FW | NGA | Abdulrahman Taiwo (from FC Zbrojovka Brno) |
| — | MF | UKR | Illya Cherednychenko (from FC Spartak Trnava) |
| — | DF | SVK | Marek Dubeň (from MFK Lokomotíva Zvolen) |

Out: Note: Flags indicate national team as defined under FIFA eligibility rules; some limited exceptions apply. Players may hold more than one non-FIFA nationality.

| No. | Pos. | Nation | Player |
|---|---|---|---|
| — | MF | SVK | Patrik Abrahám (Released) |
| — | MF | COD | Aurélien Ngeyitala (Released and joined (Ukraine) FC Arsenal Kyiv) |
| — | DF | CZE | Ondřej Vencl (End of contract) |
| — | MF | SVK | Andrej Ivančík (Released) |

=== MFK Zemplín Michalovce ===
In: Note: Flags indicate national team as defined under FIFA eligibility rules; some limited exceptions apply. Players may hold more than one non-FIFA nationality.

| No. | Pos. | Nation | Player |
|---|---|---|---|
| — | MF | SVK | Blažej Vaščák (from FK Senica) |
| — | DF | ALB | Lazarus Rota (from FK Slavoj Trebišov) |
| — | DF | UKR | Danilo Beskorovayniy (on loan from FC DAC 1904 Dunajská Streda) |
| — | DF | SVK | Matúš Vojtko (from MFK Zemplín Michalovce youth) |
| — | MF | SVK | Roman Begala (from MFK Zemplín Michalovce youth) |
| — | MF | SVK | Jakub Grič (loan return from (Poland) Sandecja Nowy Sącz) |
| — | MF | FRA | Cheikh-Alan Diarra (from (Moldova) FC Dacia Chișinău) |
| — | MF | USA | Brian Iloski (on loan from (Poland) Legia Warsaw) |
| — | DF | SVK | Denis Petro (from (Italy) S.S. Lazio Primavera) |
| — | MF | POL | Tomasz Nawotka (on loan from (Poland) Legia Warsaw) |

Out: Note: Flags indicate national team as defined under FIFA eligibility rules; some limited exceptions apply. Players may hold more than one non-FIFA nationality.

| No. | Pos. | Nation | Player |
|---|---|---|---|
| — | MF | JPN | Tsubasa Nishi (loan return to (Poland) Legia Warsaw) |
| — | FW | CRO | Tin Matić (loan return to (Poland) Legia Warsaw) |
| — | MF | LTU | Eligijus Jankauskas (loan return to MŠK Žilina) |
| — | DF | RUS | Sergei Shumeyko (Released) |
| — | DF | SVK | Milan Šimčák (to FC DAC 1904 Dunajská Streda) |
| — | MF | SVK | Martin Koscelník (to (Czech Republic) FC Slovan Liberec) |
| — | MF | SVK | Róbert Kovaľ (loan return to (Czech Republic) FK Dukla Prague) |
| — | MF | RUS | Anton Antonov (to TBA) |
| — | DF | SVK | Ladislav Šosták (Suspended due to suspicion of match fixing) |
| — | FW | RUS | Vladislav Bragin (Released) |
| — | DF | SVK | Martin Bednár (to FC DAC 1904 Dunajská Streda) |

=== FK Železiarne Podbrezová ===
In: Note: Flags indicate national team as defined under FIFA eligibility rules; some limited exceptions apply. Players may hold more than one non-FIFA nationality.

| No. | Pos. | Nation | Player |
|---|---|---|---|
| — | DF | SVK | Marek Bartoš (from FK Pohronie) |
| — | DF | SVK | Martin Baran (from (Poland) Odra Opole) |
| — | MF | SVK | Michal Obročník (from (Czech Republic) FC Slovan Liberec) |
| — | DF | SVK | Rastislav Fischer (from FK Železiarne Podbrezová II) |
| — | GK | SVK | Richard Ludha (from FK Železiarne Podbrezová youth) |
| — | MF | SVK | Nicolas Mejri (from FK Železiarne Podbrezová youth) |
| — | FW | SVK | Filip Lepieš (from FK Železiarne Podbrezová youth) |
| — | MF | SVK | Matej Turňa (from FK Železiarne Podbrezová youth) |
| — | DF | SVK | Peter Gordan (from FK Železiarne Podbrezová youth) |
| — | DF | SVK | Andrej Macuľa (from FK Železiarne Podbrezová youth) |
| — | DF | SVK | Matej Podstavek (from (Thailand) Police Tero F.C.) |
| — | MF | NZL | Jesse Edge (from (Netherlands) Achilles '29) |

Out: Note: Flags indicate national team as defined under FIFA eligibility rules; some limited exceptions apply. Players may hold more than one non-FIFA nationality.

| No. | Pos. | Nation | Player |
|---|---|---|---|
| — | DF | SVK | Ľuboš Kupčík (Released and joined MFK Dukla Banská Bystrica) |
| — | DF | SVK | Lukáš Migaľa (Released and joined MFK Dukla Banská Bystrica) |
| — | MF | SVK | Tomáš Gerát (Released and joined MFK Tatran Liptovský Mikuláš) |
| — | MF | ARG | Aldo Baéz (Released and joined ŠKF Sereď) |
| — | DF | SRB | Lazar Đorđević (End of contract - joined (Serbia) FK Vojvodina) |
| — | DF | SVK | Jaroslav Kostelný (End of contract) |
| — | GK | SVK | Samuel Vavrúš (Released) |
| — | MF | SVK | Adrián Káčerík (on loan to MFK Tatran Liptovský Mikuláš) |
| — | FW | SVK | Viktor Jedinák (to MFK Ružomberok) |
| — | DF | CRO | Karlo Bilić (Released) |
| — | DF | SVK | Ján Krivák (to (Czech Republic) MFK Karviná) |

=== FC ViOn Zlaté Moravce ===
In: Note: Flags indicate national team as defined under FIFA eligibility rules; some limited exceptions apply. Players may hold more than one non-FIFA nationality.

| No. | Pos. | Nation | Player |
|---|---|---|---|
| — | MF | SVK | Jakub Brašeň (from FK Senica) |
| — | MF | SVK | Dávid Richtárech (from FK Senica) |
| — | GK | SVK | Adrián Chovan (on loan from AS Trenčín) |
| — | GK | SVK | Martin Krnáč (from (Czech Republic) MFK Karviná) |
| — | MF | SVK | Tomáš Ďubek (from (Hungary) Zalaegerszegi TE) |
| — | DF | SVK | Patrik Banovič (from OFK Malženice) |
| — | DF | NGA | Christopher Udeh (on loan from AS Trenčín) |
| — | DF | SRB | Nikola Dimitrijević (from (Serbia) OFK Bačka Bačka Palanka) |
| — | MF | ESP | José Casado (from (Germany) FC Espanol Karlsruhe) |
| — | FW | SVK | Bruno Čerňanský (from (Czech Republic) SK Slavia Prague) |
| — | DF | SVK | Igor Zelník (from FC ViOn Zlaté Moravce youth) |
| — | DF | SRB | Aleksandar Miličević (from FK Lokomotíva Devínska Nová Ves) |
| — | MF | NGA | Wisdom Uda Kanu (on loan from FK Inter Bratislava) |
| — | MF | SVK | Branislav Ľupták (from MFK Ružomberok) |

Out: Note: Flags indicate national team as defined under FIFA eligibility rules; some limited exceptions apply. Players may hold more than one non-FIFA nationality.

| No. | Pos. | Nation | Player |
|---|---|---|---|
| — | GK | SVK | Pavel Kováč (Released) |
| — | DF | SVK | Denis Horník (loan return to FC Spartak Trnava) |
| — | FW | CZE | Ondřej Šašinka (loan return to (Czech Republic) FC Baník Ostrava) |
| — | MF | CZE | Robert Bartolomeu (loan return to (Czech Republic) FC Fastav Zlín) |
| — | DF | SVK | Juraj Kotula (loan return to ŠK Slovan Bratislava) |
| — | MF | SVK | Marek Rigo (loan return to ŠK Slovan Bratislava) |
| — | FW | BIH | Haris Harba (Released and joined (Albania) FK Kukësi) |
| — | MF | SVK | Damián Bariš (to (Czech Republic) FC Zbrojovka Brno) |
| — | MF | BRA | Mateus (to TBA) |
| — | MF | BRA | Cléber (to TBA) |
| — | DF | SRB | Miloš Nikolić (to TBA) |
| — | GK | SVK | Jozef Novota (to FK Slovan Duslo Šaľa) |
| — | GK | GEO | Giorgi Chochishvili (loan return to (Czech Republic) SK Slavia Prague) |
| — | DF | CZE | Lukáš Jančura (to TBA) |
| — | DF | SVK | Dalibor Pleva (to FK Dubnica) |

=== FK Senica ===
In: Note: Flags indicate national team as defined under FIFA eligibility rules; some limited exceptions apply. Players may hold more than one non-FIFA nationality.

| No. | Pos. | Nation | Player |
|---|---|---|---|
| — | FW | BEN | Désiré Segbé Azankpo (from Free agent) |
| — | GK | ARG | Federico Taborda (from (Italy) Civitanovese Calcio) |
| — | DF | BRA | Roberto Dias (from (Brazil) Esporte Clube Novo Hamburgo) |
| — | MF | CRO | Marko Tešija (from (Slovenia) ND Gorica) |
| — | DF | SVK | Lukáš Kučera (from FK Senica youth) |
| — | MF | SVK | Jakub Vida (from FK Senica youth) |
| — | MF | SVK | Patrik Chovan (from FK Senica youth) |
| — | FW | COL | Naren Solano (loan return from AFC Nové Mesto nad Váhom) |
| — | FW | COL | Víctor Salazar (loan return from AFC Nové Mesto nad Váhom) |
| — | FW | SVK | Matej Kosorín (loan return from AFC Nové Mesto nad Váhom) |
| — | DF | GHA | Patrick Asmah (on loan from (Italy) Atalanta B.C.) |
| — | FW | BRA | Jean Deretti (from Free agent) |
| — | MF | FRA | Sacha Petshi (from (France) US Créteil-Lusitanos) |
| — | MF | GHA | Edmund Addo (from (Ghana) Mamprobi Mighty Cosmos) |
| — | MF | CRO | Mihovil Klapan (from (Slovenia) NK Aluminij) |
| — | DF | ZAI | Chiró N'Toko (from Free agent) |
| 31 | DF | CPV | Kay (from Free agent) |

Out: Note: Flags indicate national team as defined under FIFA eligibility rules; some limited exceptions apply. Players may hold more than one non-FIFA nationality.

| No. | Pos. | Nation | Player |
|---|---|---|---|
| — | DF | COL | Ricardo Villarraga (loan return to (Colombia) Atlético Huila) |
| — | MF | GHA | Hans Nunoo Sarpei (loan return to (Germany) VfB Stuttgart) |
| — | FW | VEN | Ronaldo Chacón (loan return to (Venezuela) Caracas FC) |
| — | MF | CZE | Jan Suchan (loan return to (Czech Republic) FC Viktoria Plzeň) |
| — | MF | SVK | Viktor Miklós (on loan to FK Rača) |
| — | DF | SVK | Michal Ranko (to (Poland) Motor Lublin) |
| — | MF | SVK | Samuel Šefčík (loan return to ŠK Slovan Bratislava) |
| — | MF | SVK | Peter Ďungel (loan return to FK Pohronie) |
| — | FW | FRA | Lynel Kitambala (to TBA) |
| — | GK | SVK | Vojtech Milošovič (loan return to FC DAC 1904 Dunajská Streda and joined MFK Skalica) |
| — | GK | SVK | Dominik Holec (loan return to MŠK Žilina) |
| — | DF | CZE | Jurij Medveděv (loan return to ŠK Slovan Bratislava) |
| — | MF | SVK | Jakub Brašeň (to FC ViOn Zlaté Moravce) |
| — | MF | SVK | Dávid Richtárech (to FC ViOn Zlaté Moravce) |
| — | MF | SVK | Blažej Vaščák (to MFK Zemplín Michalovce) |
| — | DF | SVK | Oliver Práznovský (to (Armenia) FC Alashkert) |
| — | DF | SVK | Oliver Podhorín (to (Austria) SC Wiener Neustadt) |
| — | DF | SVK | Lukáš Lupták (to FC Spartak Trnava) |

=== ŠKF Sereď ===
In: Note: Flags indicate national team as defined under FIFA eligibility rules; some limited exceptions apply. Players may hold more than one non-FIFA nationality.

| No. | Pos. | Nation | Player |
|---|---|---|---|
| — | GK | NGA | David Samuel Nwolokor (on loan from (Croatia) HNK Rijeka) |
| — | DF | SVK | Tomáš Hučko (from MŠK Žilina) |
| — | DF | SVK | Jozef Menich (from MFK Ružomberok) |
| — | MF | CRO | Nikola Gatarić (from 1. FC Tatran Prešov) |
| — | FW | ARM | Vahagn Militosyan (from FC Nitra) |
| — | MF | ARG | Aldo Baéz (from FK Železiarne Podbrezová) |
| — | DF | CZE | Martin Sus (from (Czech Republic) FC Baník Ostrava) |
| — | MF | SRB | Uroš Vuković (from (Serbia) FK Voždovac) |
| — | FW | SRB | Nemanja Subotić (from (Serbia) FK Vojvodina) |

Out: Note: Flags indicate national team as defined under FIFA eligibility rules; some limited exceptions apply. Players may hold more than one non-FIFA nationality.

| No. | Pos. | Nation | Player |
|---|---|---|---|
| — | GK | SVK | Matúš Ružinský (to ŠK Slovan Bratislava) |
| — | FW | SRB | Saša Popin (to (Hungary) Zalaegerszegi TE) |
| — | FW | SVK | Ľuboslav Laura (to MFK Tatran Liptovský Mikuláš) |
| — | MF | SVK | Lukáš Mihálik (loan return to FC Spartak Trnava) |
| — | MF | EGY | Scherif El Razek (to TBA) |
