= 2017–18 FK Senica season =

Senica
2017–18 season
- Manager: Ivan Vrabec (until 11 September 2017); Ladislav Hudec (from 11 September 2017 to 8 February 2018); Ton Caanen (from 8 February 2018)
- Stadium: OMS ARENA Senica
- Slovak First Football League: 11th
- Slovak Cup: Third round
- Top goalscorer: League: Oliver Podhorín (7); All: Oliver Podhorín (7)
- Highest home attendance: 1,752 v Skalica (26 May 2018, Slovak First Football League)
- Lowest home attendance: 412 v Ružomberok (21 October 2017, Slovak First Football League)
- Average home league attendance: 754
- Biggest win: 4–0 v Rožňava (Away, 9 August 2017, Slovak Cup)
- Biggest defeat: 1–7 v Žilina (Away, 12 August 2017, Slovak First Football League)

The 2017–18 season was Futbalový klub Senica's 9th consecutive season in the Slovak First Football League. In addition to the domestic league, Senica participated in the Slovak Cup.

Senica entered the 2017–18 season under new manager Ivan Vrabec, who was appointed on 16 June 2017 after signing a one-year contract and replacing Miroslav Mentel. On 11 September, the club parted company with Vrabec by mutual agreement following seven league matches and appointed Ladislav Hudec as manager until the end of the season. On 8 February 2018, Hudec left his managerial position and moved into the club's management structure, with Ton Caanen being appointed as his successor ten days before the resumption of the Fortuna Liga season.

== Squad ==
Squad at end of season

Note: Flags indicate national team as defined under FIFA eligibility rules; some limited exceptions apply. Players may hold more than one non-FIFA nationality.

No.	Pos.	Nation	Player
2	DF	SVK	Erik Otrísal
4	DF	COL	Ricardo Villarraga
5	MF	SVK	Jakub Krč
6	MF	GHA	Hans Nunoo Sarpei
7	MF	GNB	Zezinho
8	FW	SVK	Alan Kováč
9	DF	SVK	Lukáš Lupták
10	FW	VEN	Ronaldo Chacón
11	DF	CZE	Jurij Medveděv
13	MF	SVK	Dávid Richtárech
14	DF	COL	Joan Herrera
15	MF	CZE	Jan Suchan
16	FW	VEN	Richard Celis
17	MF	SVK	Viktor Miklós

No.	Pos.	Nation	Player
18	GK	SVK	Dominik Holec
19	FW	COL	Frank Castañeda
20	DF	SVK	Oliver Podhorin
21	DF	SVK	Michal Ranko
22	MF	SVK	Blažej Vaščák
23	MF	SVK	Jakub Brašeň
24	MF	SVK	Samuel Šefčík
25	DF	SVK	Oliver Práznovský
26	MF	SVK	Peter Ďungel
27	FW	FRA	Lynel Kitambala
28	MF	COL	Diego Cuadros
29	GK	SVK	Vojtech Milošovič
39	GK	SVK	Adam Kováč

== Transfers ==
=== Summer ===
In: Note: Flags indicate national team as defined under FIFA eligibility rules; some limited exceptions apply. Players may hold more than one non-FIFA nationality.

No.	Pos.	Nation	Player
—	GK	SVK	Vojtech Milošovič (from FC DAC 1904 Dunajská Streda)
—	MF	SVK	Dávid Richtárech (from AS Trenčín)
—	DF	SVK	Oliver Podhorín (from MFK Zemplín Michalovce)
—	DF	CZE	Jurij Medveděv (from Free agent)
—	FW	BRA	Rômulo (on loan from Partizán Bardejov)
—	MF	SVK	Marek Rigo (on loan from ŠK Slovan Bratislava)
—	FW	SVK	Filip Ďuriš (on loan from ŠK Slovan Bratislava)
—	DF	SVK	Marián Jarabica (from Free agent)
—	MF	NGA	Pentecos (on loan from FK Inter Bratislava)
—	MF	SVK	Blažej Vaščák (from FK Železiarne Podbrezová)
—	MF	SVK	Denis Duga (from Free agent)
—	DF	SVK	Erik Čikoš (from Free agent)

Out: Note: Flags indicate national team as defined under FIFA eligibility rules; some limited exceptions apply. Players may hold more than one non-FIFA nationality.

No.	Pos.	Nation	Player
—	DF	SVK	Róbert Pillár (to (Hungary) Mezőkövesdi SE)
—	MF	SVK	Adrián Kopičár (to FK Železiarne Podbrezová)
—	MF	SVK	Filip Blažek (to (Denmark) Brøndby IF)
—	FW	SVK	Tomáš Brigant (loan return to (Czech Republic) FC Zbrojovka Brno)
—	DF	SVK	Erik Čikoš (to ŠK Slovan Bratislava)

=== Winter ===
In: Note: Flags indicate national team as defined under FIFA eligibility rules; some limited exceptions apply. Players may hold more than one non-FIFA nationality.

No.	Pos.	Nation	Player
—	MF	SVK	Matej Kosorín (loan return from AFC Nové Mesto nad Váhom)
—	FW	VEN	Ronaldo Chacón (on loan from (Venezuela) Caracas FC)
—	FW	VEN	Richard Celis (on loan from (Venezuela) Deportivo JBL del Zulia)
—	FW	COL	Diego Cuadros (on loan from (Colombia) Jaguares de Córdoba)
—	FW	COL	Frank Castañeda (on loan from (Colombia) Orsomarso S.C.)
—	MF	SVK	Jakub Brašeň (from (Hungary) Mezőkövesdi SE)
—	FW	SVK	Peter Ďungel (on loan from FK Pohronie)
—	DF	COL	Joan Herrera (from Free Agent)
—	GK	SVK	Dominik Holec (on loan from MŠK Žilina B)
—	MF	GNB	Zezinho (from Free Agent)
—	MF	CZE	Jan Suchan (on loan from (Czech Republic) Viktoria Plzeň)
—	DF	COL	Ricardo Villarraga (on loan from (Colombia) Atlético Huila)
—	DF	CZE	Jurij Medveděv (on loan from ŠK Slovan Bratislava)
—	DF	SVK	Oliver Práznovský (from Free agent)
—	FW	FRA	Lynel Kitambala (from Free Agent)

Out: Note: Flags indicate national team as defined under FIFA eligibility rules; some limited exceptions apply. Players may hold more than one non-FIFA nationality.

No.	Pos.	Nation	Player
—	GK	SVK	Michal Šulla (to ŠK Slovan Bratislava)
—	GK	SVK	František Plach (to (Poland) Piast Gliwice)
—	MF	SVK	Marek Rigo (loan return to ŠK Slovan Bratislava)
—	DF	CZE	Jurij Medveděv (to ŠK Slovan Bratislava)
—	FW	BRA	Rômulo (loan return to Partizán Bardejov)
—	MF	NGA	Pentecos (loan return to FK Inter Bratislava)
—	MF	SVK	Dominik Malý (loan return to ŠK Slovan Bratislava II)
—	FW	SVK	Filip Ďuriš (loan return to ŠK Slovan Bratislava)
—	FW	SVK	Jakub Reľovský (loan return to MFK Stará Ľubovňa)
—	FW	CZE	Dominik Smékal (loan return to (Czech Republic) FC Baník Ostrava)
—	DF	SVK	Marián Jarabica (to TBA)
—	MF	SVK	Denis Duga (to FC ViOn Zlaté Moravce)
—	DF	SVK	Martin Červeňák (to TBA)
—	DF	ISR	Amir Ben-Shimon (to TBA)

== Competitions ==
=== Overview ===
Competition	First match	Last match	Starting round	Final position	Record							
Competition	First match	Last match	Starting round	Final position	Pld	W	D	L	GF	GA	GD	Win %
Slovak First Football League	23 July 2017	19 May 2018	Matchday 1	11th	32	6	8	18	29	58	−29	18.75
Slovak First Football League relegation play-offs	22 May 2018	26 May 2018	First leg	Winners	2	1	0	1	2	2	+0	50.00
Slovak Cup	9 August 2017	13 September 2017	Second round	Third round	2	1	1	0	5	1	+4	50.00
Total					36	8	9	19	36	61	−25	22.22

Source: Competitions

=== Slovak First Football League ===
==== Regular season ====
===== League table =====
Pos	Team	Pld	W	D	L	GF	GA	GD	Pts	Qualification
8	Zemplín Michalovce	22	6	6	10	18	25	−7	24	Qualification for the relegation group
9	Podbrezová	22	6	2	14	19	37	−18	20	Qualification for the relegation group
10	ViOn Zlaté Moravce	22	7	4	11	28	37	−9	25	Qualification for the relegation group
11	Senica	22	3	5	14	17	42	−25	14	Qualification for the relegation group
12	Tatran Prešov	22	3	5	14	13	44	−31	14	Qualification for the relegation group

Source: Niké liga (in Slovak)
Rules for classification: 1) Points; 2) Head-to-head points; 3) Head-to-head goal difference; 4) Head-to-head away goals scored; 5) Play-off.

===== Results summary =====
Overall								Home						Away					
Pld	W	D	L	GF	GA	GD	Pts	W	D	L	GF	GA	GD	W	D	L	GF	GA	GD
22	3	5	14	17	42	−25	14	3	2	6	10	15	−5	0	3	8	7	27	−20

Source: Fortuna liga

===== Results by round =====
Round	1	2	3	4	5	6	7	8	9	10	11	12	13	14	15	16	17	18	19	20	21	22
Ground	H	A	H	A	H	A	H	A	A	H	A	A	H	A	H	A	H	A	H	H	A	H
Result	L	L	D	L	L	D	L	L	L	L	L	L	L	D	W	D	W	L	D	L	L	W
Position	7	12	11	12	12	12	12	12	12	12	12	12	12	12	12	12	12	12	12	12	12	11
Points	0	0	1	1	1	2	2	2	2	2	2	2	2	3	6	7	10	10	11	11	11	14

Source: Worldfootball
A = Away; H = Home; W = Win; D = Draw; L = Loss

===== Matches =====
23 July 2017 1	Senica	1–2	Trenčín	Senica
18:30 CEST (UTC+2)	Kováč (yellow card) 87', (goal) 90'	Report	Gong 14'; Paur 47', (yellow card) 83'	Stadium: OMS ARENA Senica; Attendance: 1,213; Referee: Michal Smolák; Assistant referees: Erik Weiss, Peter Jenčura

30 July 2017 2	Ružomberok	4–0	Senica	Ružomberok
19:00 CEST (UTC+2)	Kružliak 26', 43' (pen.); Kostadinov (yellow card) 45'; Haskić 58'; Lačný 74'; Kunca (yellow card) 87'	Report	Podhorín (yellow card) 15' (yellow-red card) 23'; Otrísal (yellow card) 23'; Ranko (yellow card) 43'	Stadium: Štadión pod Čebraťom; Attendance: 1,394; Referee: Pavel Ochotnický; Assistant referees: Branislav Hancko, Andrej Hrmo

4 August 2017 3	Senica	1–1	Slovan Bratislava	Senica
18:30 CEST (UTC+2)	Rômulo (yellow card) 23'; Medveděv (yellow card) 74'; Vaščák 81'	Report	Mareš 2'; Droppa (yellow card) 27'; Rundić (yellow card) 37'; Hološko (yellow card) 42'	Stadium: OMS ARENA Senica; Attendance: 1,353; Referee: Boris Marhefka; Assistant referees: Dušan Hrčka, Gabriel Ádám

12 August 2017 4	Žilina	7–1	Senica	Žilina
19:00 CEST (UTC+2)	Mráz 20', 74'; Káčer 29'; Hancko 34'; Ranko 36' (o.g.); Kaša (yellow card) 65'; Mazáň (yellow card) 66'; Škvarka 78', 84'	Report	Otrísal (yellow card) 54'; Medveděv (yellow card) 66'; Ďuriš 67' (pen.), (yellow card) 88'; Plach (yellow card) 78'	Stadium: Štadión pod Dubňom; Attendance: 2,656; Referee: Peter Ziemba; Assistant referees: Marek Galo, Andrej Hrmo

19 August 2017 5	Senica	0–1	Nitra	Senica
19:00 CEST (UTC+2)	Čikoš (yellow card) 65'; Jarabica (yellow card) 80' (yellow-red card) 80'; Vaščák (yellow card) 81'; Ďuriš (yellow card) 85'; Medveděv (yellow card) 90'	Report	Charizopulos (yellow card) 40'; Balaj 65' (pen.); Niba (red card) 83'; Fábry (yellow card) 84'; Kuník (yellow card) 90'	Stadium: OMS ARENA Senica; Attendance: 915; Referee: Adam Somoláni; Assistant referees: Tomáš Somoláni, Matej Barenčík

26 August 2017 6	Tatran Prešov	2–2	Senica	Poprad (Note: Tatran Prešov played their home matches at the NTC Poprad in Poprad due to the rebuilding of their own Tatran Stadium in Prešov.)
19:00 CEST (UTC+2)	Černák 29'; Bartek (red card) 56'; Adekunle 61'	Report	Ďuriš (red card) 56'; Vaščák (yellow card) 57'; Podhorín 69', 90'; Kováč (yellow card) 86'	Stadium: NTC Poprad; Attendance: 353; Referee: Ladislav Prešinský; Assistant referees: Mário Roszbeck, Peter Jenčura

9 September 2017 7	Senica	0–1	ViOn Zlaté Moravce	Senica
19:00 CEST (UTC+2)	Richtárech (yellow card) 68'	Report	Karlík 45' (pen.); Gešnábel (yellow card) 56'; Urgela (yellow card) 63'; Cléber (yellow card) 85'	Stadium: OMS ARENA Senica; Attendance: 682; Referee: Peter Kráľovič; Assistant referees: Miroslav Benko, František Ferenc

16 September 2017 8	Zemplín Michalovce	2–1	Senica	Michalovce
19:00 CEST (UTC+2)	Sulley 25', 76'; Sverchinskiy (yellow card) 63'	Report	Podhorín 60'; Sarpei (yellow card) 69'; Vaščák (yellow card) 70'	Stadium: Mestský futbalový štadión Attendance: 1,968; Referee: Ladislav Prešinský; Assistant referees: Gabriel Ádám, Martin Borsányi

20 September 2017 9	DAC Dunajská Streda	1–0	Senica	Dunajská Streda
19:00 CEST (UTC+2)	Davis 86'; Kalmár (yellow card) 90'	Report	Richtárech (yellow card) 74'; Vaščák (yellow card) 87'	Stadium: MOL Aréna; Attendance: 4,598; Referee: Pavol Chmura; Assistant referees: Juraj Lieskovský, Anton Perát

23 September 2017 10	Senica	1–3	Spartak Trnava	Senica
19:00 CEST (UTC+2)	Sarpei (yellow card) 29'; Ranko (yellow card) 35'; Krč (yellow card) 60'; Rômulo (yellow card) 65'; Medveděv 70', (yellow card) 76'	Report	Egho 15'; Jirka 37'; Hladík (yellow card) 65'; Godál 77' (pen.); Vantruba (yellow card) 84'	Stadium: OMS ARENA Senica; Attendance: 1,501; Referee: Mário Vlk; Assistant referees: Erik Weiss, Marek Galo

30 September 2017 11	Podbrezová	1–0	Senica	Podbrezová
19:00 CEST (UTC+2)	Rendla 10'; Leško (yellow card) 77'	Report	Podhorín (yellow card) 80'; Ranko (yellow card) 84'	Stadium: ZELPO Aréna; Attendance: 1,011; Referee: Peter Ziemba; Assistant referees: Tomáš Somoláni, Peter Bednár

14 October 2017 12	Trenčín	4–1	Senica	Trenčín
17:00 CEST (UTC+2)	Van Haaren 41'; Janga 44', 52'; Šulek 66'	Report	Podhorín 80' (pen.)	Stadium: Štadión na Sihoti; Attendance: 1,448; Referee: Filip Glova; Assistant referees: Michal Tomčík, Gabriel Ádám

21 October 2017 13	Senica	0–3	Ružomberok	Senica
17:00 CEST (UTC+2)	Krč (yellow card) 25'; Vaščák (yellow card) 67'	Report	Haskić 67'; Kostadinov 69'; Kružliak (yellow card) 71'; Daniel 75'	Stadium: OMS ARENA Senica; Attendance: 412; Referee: Peter Kráľovič; Assistant referees: Radoslav Bobko, Andrej Hrmo

28 October 2017 14	Slovan Bratislava	2–2	Senica	Bratislava
17:00 CEST (UTC+2)	Sekulić 7'; Hološko (yellow card) 25'; Mareš 33' (pen.)	Report	Krč (yellow card) 22'; Duga 46'; Podhorín 49'	Stadium: Pasienky; Attendance: 481; Referee: Pavel Ochotnický; Assistant referees: Peter Kováč, Rastislav Žákech

5 November 2017 15	Senica	4–1	Žilina	Senica
17:00 CET (UTC+1)	Vaščák 24'; Šefčík 30'; Medveděv 47', (yellow card) 61'; Ranko (yellow card) 65'; Kováč 90'	Report	Káčer 39' (pen.)	Stadium: OMS ARENA Senica; Attendance: 495; Referee: Peter Ziemba; Assistant referees: Peter Bednár, Marek Galo

18 November 2017 16	Nitra	0–0	Senica	Nitra
14:00 CET (UTC+1)	Machovec (yellow card) 28'	Report	Krč (yellow card) 17'	Stadium: Štadión pod Zoborom; Attendance: 1,019; Referee: Mário Vlk; Assistant referees: Martin Borsányi, Daniel Poláček

25 November 2017 17	Senica	1–0	Tatran Prešov	Senica
14:00 CET (UTC+1)	Otrísal (yellow card) 66'; Ranko 76'; Medveděv (yellow card) 84'	Report	Černák (yellow card) 43'; Bartek (yellow card) 45'	Stadium: OMS ARENA Senica; Attendance: 487; Referee: Ivan Kružliak; Assistant referees: Michal Tomčík, Mário Roszbeck

2 December 2017 18	ViOn Zlaté Moravce	3–0	Senica	Zlaté Moravce
14:00 CET (UTC+1)	Gešnábel 16', 53', (yellow card) 87'; Chren 19'	Report		Stadium: Štadión FC ViOn; Attendance: 512; Referee: Dušan Sedlák; Assistant referees: Gabriel Ádám, Martin Špivák

9 December 2017 19	Senica	1–1	Zemplín Michalovce	Senica
14:00 CET (UTC+1)	Medveděv 24'; Podhorín (yellow card) 29'; Vaščák (yellow card) 57'; Krč (yellow card) 67'	Report	Danko 55'; Antonov (yellow card) 69'	Stadium: OMS ARENA Senica; Attendance: 457; Referee: Patrik Hrčka; Assistant referees: Tomáš Vorel, Peter Bednár

18 February 2018 20	Senica	0–2	DAC Dunajská Streda	Senica
14:00 CET (UTC+1)	Ranko (yellow card) 19'; Sarpei (yellow card) 36'; Zezinho (yellow card) 75'	Report	Kalmár (yellow card) 39', (goal) 66'; Koštrna (yellow card) 49'; Pačinda 70', (yellow card) 73' (yellow-red card) 78'	Stadium: OMS ARENA Senica; Attendance: 923; Referee: Kamil Horváth; Assistant referees: Michal Tomčík, Tomáš Vorel

24 February 2018 21	Spartak Trnava	1–0	Senica	Trnava
14:00 CET (UTC+1)	Sloboda (yellow card) 80'; Ofosu 90'	Report	Cuadros (yellow card) 53'; Vaščák (yellow card) 55'; Chacón (yellow card) 58'; Zezinho (yellow card) 68'	Stadium: Štadión Antona Malatinského; Attendance: 3,312; Referee: Michal Smolák; Assistant referees: Tomáš Mókoš, Matej Barenčík

3 March 2018 22	Senica	1–0	Podbrezová	Senica
14:00 CET (UTC+1)	Zezinho (yellow card) 20'; Podhorín (yellow card) 83', (goal) 89' (pen.)	Report	Baéz (yellow card) 35'; Njire (yellow card) 85'	Stadium: OMS ARENA Senica; Attendance: 415; Referee: Jozef Pavlík; Assistant referees: Tomáš Somoláni, Martin Špivák

==== Relegation group ====
===== League table =====
Pos	Team	Pld	W	D	L	GF	GA	GD	Pts	Qualification or relegation	NIT	ZMI	POD	ZLM	SEN	TAT
7	Nitra	32	11	12	9	33	29	+4	45	Qualification for Europa League play-offs (Note: As the winners of 2017–18 Slovak Cup (ŠK Slovan Bratislava) finished in the top three of the league, the last Europa League spot awarded through the league (first qualifying round) will be decided by play-offs among the teams finishing fourth to seventh.)	—	1–3	0–0	1–0	5–2	3–2
8	Zemplín Michalovce	32	11	8	13	35	34	+1	41		4–0	—	1–0	2–0	1–2	0–0
9	Podbrezová	32	11	5	16	29	43	−14	38		1–0	2–1	—	1–0	3–1	1–1
10	ViOn Zlaté Moravce	32	8	7	17	39	52	−13	31		2–2	2–2	0–1	—	2–2	4–0
11	Senica (O)	32	6	8	18	29	58	−29	26	Qualification for relegation play-offs	0–1	0–2	1–0	3–1	—	0–0
12	Tatran Prešov (R)	32	5	11	16	22	56	−34	26	Relegation to 2. Liga	1–1	2–1	1–1	1–0	1–1	—

Source: Niké liga (in Slovak)
Legend: Blue = home team win; Yellow = draw; Red = away team win.
Rules for classification: 1) Points; 2) Head-to-head points; 3) Head-to-head goal difference; 4) Head-to-head away goals scored; 5) Play-off.
(O) Play-off winners; (R) Relegated

===== Results summary =====
Overall								Home						Away					
Pld	W	D	L	GF	GA	GD	Pts	W	D	L	GF	GA	GD	W	D	L	GF	GA	GD
10	3	3	4	12	16	−4	12	2	1	2	4	4	0	1	2	2	8	12	−4

Source: Worldfootball

===== Results by round =====
Round	23	24	25	26	27	28	29	30	31	32
Ground	H	A	A	H	A	H	A	H	H	A
Result	L	D	D	L	L	W	W	W	D	L
Position	12	12	12	12	12	12	11	11	11	11
Points	14	15	16	16	16	19	22	25	26	26

Source: Fortuna liga
A = Away; H = Home; W = Win; D = Draw; L = Loss

===== Matches =====
10 March 2018 23	Senica	0–1	Nitra	Senica
14:00 CET (UTC+1)	Celis (yellow card) 77' (yellow-red card) 88'	Report	Šimončič (yellow card) 7', (goal) 61'; Steinhübel (yellow card) 12'; Charizopulos (yellow card) 65'	Stadium: OMS ARENA Senica; Attendance: 584; Referee: Michal Očenáš; Assistant referees: Peter Bednár, Juraj Lieskovský

16 March 2018 24	Tatran Prešov	1–1	Senica	Poprad
17:00 CET (UTC+1)	Gatarić 52'	Report	Kováč (yellow card) 77'; Kitambala 80'	Stadium: NTC Poprad; Attendance: 160; Referee: Michal Smolák; Assistant referees: Michal Tomčík, Tomáš Vorel

31 March 2018 25	ViOn Zlaté Moravce	2–2	Senica	Zlaté Moravce
14:00 CEST (UTC+2)	Pintér (yellow card) 6', (goal) 59'; Cléber (yellow card) 21'; Orávik 33'; Kotula (yellow card) 41'; Duga (yellow card) 71'; Šašinka (yellow card) 75'	Report	Sarpei (yellow card) 27'; Brašeň (yellow card) 37'; Celis (yellow card) 38'; Kitambala 50', 54'; Zezinho (yellow card) 68'; Ranko (yellow card) 72'	Stadium: Štadión FC ViOn; Attendance: 526; Referee: Kamil Horváth; Assistant referees: František Ferenc, Daniel Poláček

7 April 2018 26	Senica	0–2	Zemplín Michalovce	Senica
17:00 CEST (UTC+2)	Celis (yellow card) 72'; Kitambala (yellow card) 90'	Report	Koscelník 36', (yellow card) 37'; Bednár (yellow card) 63'; Kurminowski (yellow card) 66', (goal) 90'	Stadium: OMS ARENA Senica; Attendance: 497; Referee: Martin Dohál; Assistant referees: Michal Tomčík, Andrej Hrmo

14 April 2018 27	Podbrezová	3–1	Senica	Podbrezová
17:00 CEST (UTC+2)	Leško 52', (yellow card) 79'; Bernadina 73'; Ranko 77' (o.g.)	Report	Kitambala 54'; Richtárech (yellow card) 71'; Zezinho (yellow card) 73'; Villarraga (yellow card) 76'; Medveděv (yellow card) 79'	Stadium: ZELPO Aréna; Attendance: 812; Referee: Jozef Pavlík; Assistant referees: Radoslav Bobko, Marek Galo

21 April 2018 28	Senica	1–0	Podbrezová	Senica
17:00 CEST (UTC+2)	Krč (yellow card) 26'; Castañeda 38'; Herrera (yellow card) 78'; Villarraga (yellow card) 79'; Vaščák (yellow card) 90'	Report	Sedláček (yellow card) 17'	Stadium: OMS ARENA Senica; Attendance: 451; Referee: Pavol Chmura; Assistant referees: Tomáš Vorel, Milan Štrbo

28 April 2018 29	Zemplín Michalovce	1–2	Senica	Michalovce
17:00 CEST (UTC+2)	Carrillo (yellow card) 9'; Sulley 39'; Regáli (yellow card) 61'; Žofčák (yellow card) 83'; Bednár (yellow card) 83'	Report	Práznovský 17'; Castañeda 26'; Brašeň (yellow card) 52'; Kováč (yellow card) 68'; Kitambala (yellow card) 74'; Medveděv (yellow card) 85'	Stadium: Mestský futbalový štadión Attendance: 938; Referee: Adam Somoláni; Assistant referees: Ján Pozor, Mário Roszbeck

5 May 2018 30	Senica	3–1	ViOn Zlaté Moravce	Senica
17:00 CEST (UTC+2)	Castañeda 9', 45' (pen.), 90'; Chacón (yellow card) 35'; Ranko (yellow card) 59'; Zezinho (yellow card) 63'	Report	Ewerton 41'; Kotula (red card) 44'; Pintér (yellow card) 47'	Stadium: OMS ARENA Senica; Attendance: 793; Referee: Adam Somoláni; Assistant referees: Peter Kováč, Rastislav Žákech

12 May 2018 31	Senica	0–0	Tatran Prešov	Senica
17:45 CEST (UTC+2)	Ranko (yellow card) 8'; Chacón (yellow card) 69'; Lupták (yellow card) 88'	Report	Luberda (yellow card) 40'; Prikryl (yellow card) 79'; Udeh (yellow card) 88'	Stadium: OMS ARENA Senica; Attendance: 891; Referee: Jozef Pavlík; Assistant referees: Dušan Hrčka, Andrej Hrmo

19 May 2018 32	Nitra	5–2	Senica	Nitra
17:00 CEST (UTC+2)	Vestenický 27', 66'; Farkaš (yellow card) 36', (goal) 84'; Charizopulos 45'; Šimončič (yellow card) 55', (goal) 56'	Report	Kováč 28'; Medveděv (yellow card) 36'; Podhorín 40' (pen.); Otrísal (yellow card) 52'	Stadium: Štadión pod Zoborom; Attendance: 320; Referee: Filip Glova; Assistant referees: Andrej Hrmo, Peter Chládek

==== Relegation play-offs ====
22 May 2018 First leg	Skalica	2–1	Senica	Skalica
17:20 CEST (UTC+2)	Szöcs (yellow card) 21'; Sombat 23'; Švrček (yellow card) 39'; Mizerák (yellow card) 44' (yellow-red card) 83'; Majerník 45'; Opiela (yellow card) 71'	Report	Chacón 10'; Villarraga (yellow card) 32'; Zezinho (yellow card) 89'	Stadium: Mestský štadión Skalica; Attendance: 2,137; Referee: Ivan Kružliak; Assistant referees: Miroslav Benko, Marek Galo

26 May 2018 Second leg	Senica	1–0 ((a) 2–2 agg.)	Skalica	Senica
17:20 CEST (UTC+2)	Villarraga (yellow card) 49'; Kitambala 69'; Herrera (yellow card) 90'	Report	Lipták (yellow card) 37'; Szöcs (yellow card) 85'; Jakubek (yellow card) 90'; Majtán (yellow card) 90'	Stadium: OMS ARENA Senica; Attendance: 1,752; Referee: Peter Ziemba; Assistant referees: Peter Kováč, Peter Chládek
Note: 2–2 on aggregate. Senica won on away goals.

=== Slovak Cup ===
9 August 2017 Second round	Rožňava	0–4	Senica	Rožňava
16:30 CEST (UTC+2)		Report	Ďuriš 20'; Otrísal (yellow card) 35'; Obiechina 41'; Martišiak 58', 78'	Attendance: 1,000; Referee: Peter Vlčej; Assistant referees: Erik Weiss, Simeon Vass

13 September 2017 Third round	Medzev	1–1 (5–4 p)	Senica	Medzev
16:10 CEST (UTC+2)	Palencsár 23'; Lukáč (yellow card) 36'; Seman (yellow card) 42'	Report	Medveděv (yellow card) 3'; Krč (yellow card) 38'; Ranko (yellow card) 66'; Podhorín (yellow card) 72'; Ďuriš 88'	Attendance: 600; Referee: Roland Weiss; Assistant referees: Anton Perát, Peter Ličko
Note: Medzev won 5–4 on penalties.
