= Villarraga =

Villarraga is a surname. Notable people with the surname include:

- César Villarraga (born 1985), Colombian boxer
- Ricardo Villarraga (born 1990), Colombian footballer
