= Victor Salazar (disambiguation) =

Victor Salazar was an American businessman, political figure and officeholder.

The name may also refer to:

- Víctor Salazar (footballer, born 1991), Colombian footballer
- Víctor Salazar (footballer, born 1993), Argentine footballer
- Victor Salazar, fictional character from the television series Love, Victor
- Víctor Salazar, an Argentine soldier who was one of the four servicemen convicted of the murder of Omar Carrasco in 1994

== See also ==
- Víctor Zalazar, Argentine boxer
