= Kontar =

Kontar is a surname. Notable people with the surname include:

- Hassan Al Kontar, Syrian refugee who was stranded at Kuala Lumpur International Airport
- Zoltán Kontár, Slovak professional footballer
- Samir Kontar, Lebanese politician

== See also ==
- Kuntar
- Kantar (disambiguation)
