= Urminský =

Urminský is a surname. Notable people with the surname include:

- Lukáš Urminský (born 1992), Slovak footballer
- Peter Urminský (born 1999), Slovak footballer
