= Joan Herrera =

Joan Herrera may refer to:

- Joan Herrera i Torres (born 1970), Spanish lawyer and politician
- Joan Herrera (footballer) (born 1994), Colombian footballer
