= Grzegorz Więzik =

Polish footballer (1963–2021)

Personal information
- Date of birth: 21 July 1963
- Place of birth: Łodygowice, Poland
- Date of death: 26 December 2021 (aged 58)
- Height: 1.83 m (6 ft 0 in)
- Position(s): Midfielder

Senior career*
Years	Team	Apps	(Gls)
1982–1983	LKS Łodygowice		
1982–1983	BKS Stal Bielsko-Biała		
1983–1985	Start Łódź		
1984–1989	ŁKS Łódź	86	(14)
1989–1990	1. FC Kaiserslautern	3	(0)
1990–1991	Mulhouse	21	(3)
1991–1993	Silkeborg IF	19	(3)
1993–1994	Viborg FF	18	(3)
1994–1995	BSC Sendling		
1995–1996	Ikast FS		
1995–1996	Eintracht Trier		
1996–1997	MKS Myszków		
1997–1998	Dyskobolia Grodzisk	15	(2)
1998–2001	BBTS Bielsko-Biała		
2000–2001	KSZO Ostrowiec		
2001–2002	BBTS Bielsko-Biała		
2002–2003	Podbeskidzie	19	(2)
2005–2006	LKS Łodygowice		
- *Club domestic league appearances and goals

Grzegorz Więzik (21 July 1963 – 26 December 2021) was a Polish professional footballer who played as a midfielder. He was the father of footballer Jakub Więzik. Following retirement, he worked for Podbeskidzie Bielsko-Biała in several roles, and was a scout for Śląsk Wrocław. He died on 26 December 2021, at the age of 58.

== Honours ==
1. FC Kaiserslautern

- DFB-Pokal: 1989–90
