= Kuntar =

Kuntar is a surname. Notable people with the surname include:

- Samir Kuntar (1962–2015), Lebanese politician
- Les Kuntar (born 1969), American ice hockey player
- Trevor Kuntar (born 2001), American ice hockey player

== See also ==
- Kontar
- Kantar (disambiguation)
