= FK Tatran Turzovka =

Slovak football club

Tatran Turzovka
- Full name: FK Tatran Turzovka
- Founded: 1923
- Stadium: Areál FK Tatran, Turzovka
- President: Ladislav Hejčík
- League: 4. Liga
- Website: https://www.tatrantka.sk/
Away colours

FK Tatran Turzovka is a Slovak football club based in the town of Turzovka in the Žilina Region. They currently play in the Majstrovstvá regiónu - IV.liga SsFZ, the 4th tier of the Slovak football league system.

== History ==
=== 1920—1945: Early years ===
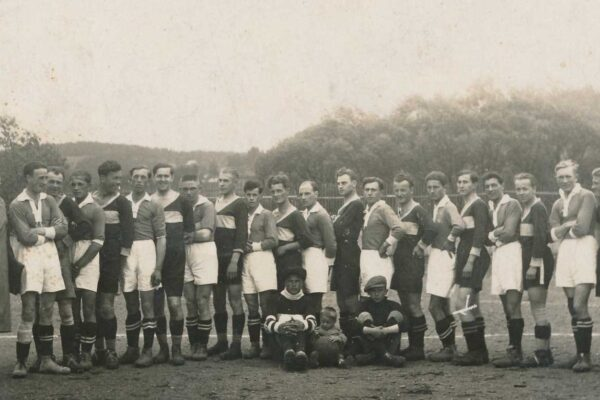
Turzovka players in 1933 (wearing white shorts).

The predecessor of Tatran Turzovka was founded in the first half of the 1920s. The first documented match was played in August 1923 against Slovan Bytča which was won 3–1. The club's activities were later paralyzed, probably in connection with the economic crisis. The activities of T.L.A.C. or AC Turzovka were continued by ŠK Turzovka in 1931. It was therefore a renewal of the previously operating club. The renewed sports club rented land from the urban planning municipality and built its own field at a cost of CZK 20,000. During World War II, the club operated under the name HG Turzovka. After its end in 1945, it returned to the name ŠK Turzovka.

=== 1950–present: Recent years ===
In 1953, JTO Sokol was renamed Tatran Turzovka. It has been operating under this name to this day. The club's most successful period so far was the 1990s, when Tatran gradually fought its way up from the district competition to the 5. Liga, which was the highest league Turzovka has played in. Since the 2000/2001 season, it had played in the district competition, the 6. Liga, with the exception of one season. In the 2016/2017 season, Tatran managed to advance to the 5th highest Slovak competition – the 5. Liga. In the 2020/2021 season, Tatran Turzovka won the 5. Liga with the best attack and defense, once again advancing to the IV. Liga Sever which was renamed to V.liga Sever after reorganization a year later. In 2025/2026 the club reached 2nd place and was promoted to Championship of the Central Region - IV. liga.

== Ground ==
Since the 1930s, it had not had any stand, but after its construction in 1947, it boasted a stand with facilities. The facilities were ahead of their time, but the quality of the playing field gradually began to fall behind. In 1973, the stadium had to give way to socialist construction. The club found temporary ground in Podvysoká and then an alternative solution on a cinder pitch in Predmier, where it remained in a makeshift until 1990, when it moved to its current stadium in Závodie. This has been its home stand for more than three decades.

== Honors ==
Domestic

- 2020/2021 5. Liga: winners.

== Notable players ==
Past (and present) players who are the subjects of Wikipedia articles can be found here.

- (Slovakia) Marián Jarabica
- (Slovakia) Adrián Kopičár (youth)
- (Slovakia) Lukáš Urminský
