= Stanley Oganbor =

Nigerian footballer

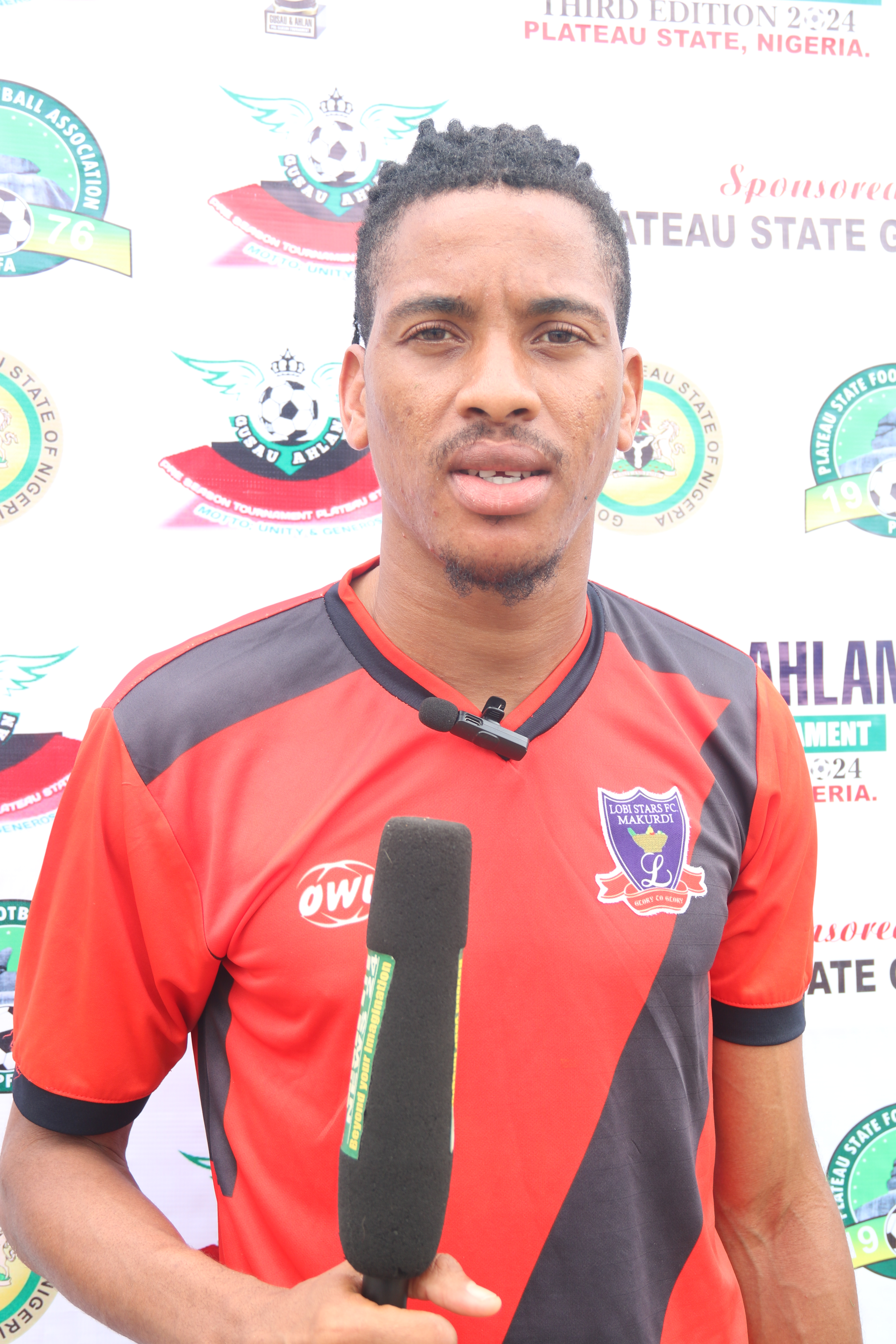

Personal information
- Full name: Stanley Chukwudi Oganbor
- Date of birth: 10 July 1998 (age 28)
- Place of birth: Lagos, Nigeria
- Height: 1.88 m (6 ft 2 in)
- Position: Forward

Senior career*
Years	Team	Apps	(Gls)
2015–2017	Lagos Islanders		
2017–2018	Inter Bratislava	2	(0)
2019–2021	Flight FC Gboko	30	(18)
2021	FC Tulsa	3	(0)
2022-2023	Flight FC Gboko	18	(14)
2023	Lobi Stars FC Makurdi	30	(6)
- * Club domestic league appearances and goals ‡ National team caps and goals as of 00:40, 7 November 2021 (UTC)

Stanley Chukwudi Oganbor (born 10 July 1998) is a Nigerian footballer who plays as a forward for Lobi Stars Football Club Makurdi.

== Career ==
On 9 February 2021, Oganbor signed with USL Championship side FC Tulsa. He made his debut on 2 June 2021, appearing as a 72nd-minute substitute during a 4–1 loss to Sporting Kansas City II.

After one year of play, he returned to Nigeria, and without a professional contract featured for Flight FC Gboko in the 2021–2022 and 2022–2023 NLO seasons. Oganbor joined Lobi Stars Football Club Makurdi for the 2023–2024 season, making his professional debut on 22 October 2024 against Abia Warriors, appearing as a 68th-minute substitute during a 2-0 win over Abia Warriors. Oganbor scored his first NPFL goal against Enugu Rangers International in the 83rd minute on 2 November 2023, leading Lobi Stars to a 2-1 victory over Enugu Rangers International. Oganbor finished the 2023–2024 season with 6 goals and 5 assists.
