= ŠK Prameň Kováčová =

Slovak football club

- Full name: ŠK Prameň Kováčová
- Ground: Futbalový štadión ŠK Prameň Kováčová, Kováčová
- Capacity: 1,000
- Head coach: Lukáš Ríša
- League: Tipos 3. Liga
- 2019–20: 6th/16

ŠK Prameň Kováčová is a Slovak football team, based in the town of Kováčová. Currently sitting in the 4th division of Slovak football, it was considered flourishing while under Ján Volko.

ŠK Prameň Kováčová's youth team, coached by Kristián Drahoň, gained promotion to the Slovak second league in the 2019–2020 season. Players in the squad included Tomáš Kováč, Richard Piršč, Michal Holčík, and Michal Novikmec.

== Current squad ==
As of 30 September 2020 Note: Flags indicate national team as defined under FIFA eligibility rules; some limited exceptions apply. Players may hold more than one non-FIFA nationality.

No.	Pos.	Nation	Player
7	FW	SVK	Erik Hric
10	MF	SVK	Nicolas Mejri

No.	Pos.	Nation	Player
19	MF	SVK	Viktor Mojžiš

== Colours ==
The club colours are yellow and blue. A famous original slogan of the tram was ”Yellow, blue are our colors, we will defeat the opponent and victory is ours.”
