= Andrej Maťašovský =

Slovak footballer (born 1988)

Personal information
- Full name: Andrej Maťašovský
- Date of birth: 20 August 1988 (age 38)
- Place of birth: Czechoslovakia
- Height: 1.94 m (6 ft 4 in)
- Position: Goalkeeper

Team information
- Current team: FKM Nové Zámky

Youth career
- –2003: FC Nitra
- 2003–2007: TJ Slovan Nitra-Chrenová
- 2006–2007: → ViOn Zlaté Moravce (loan)

Senior career*
Years	Team	Apps	(Gls)
2007–	FC Veselí nad Moravou		
–2011	SK Baťov 1930		
2012	MFK Nová Dubnica		
2012	→ Dubnica (loan)		
2013–2015	Dubnica	50	(0)
2014	→ ŽP Šport Podbrezová (loan)	13	(0)
2015–2017	Dukla Banská Bystrica	24	(0)
2017	Sereď	8	(0)
2018	Komárno	8	(0)
2018	Slovan Bratislava	5	(0)
2019	ŠK Tvrdošovce		
2019–2020	Gabčíkovo		
2020–2023	Dynamo Malženice		
2023–	FKM Nové Zámky		
- * Club domestic league appearances and goals as of 30 December 2025

Andrej Maťašovský (born 20 August 1988) is a Slovak football goalkeeper who currently plays for FKM Nové Zámky.

== Club career ==
Maťašovský became known in Považí, as he had previously played in the lower Czech competitions. He is a product of the FC Nitra academy.

=== Podbrezová ===
In 2014, Maťašovský joined ZP SPORT Podbrezova on a loan following the injury of the club’s main goalkeeper, Jozef Hanák at the end of the team's summer training. Maťašovský made his professional debut for ŽP Šport Podbrezová on 27 July 2014 in a 2–0 away loss in the league against AS Trenčín. In his following three matches, he would successfully keep clean sheets against Dukla Banská Bystrica, Spartak Trnava and MŠK Žilina. Following his good performances, Maťašovský became the 10th most valuable goalkeeper in the first league. On 21 December 2014, it was announced that Maťašovský would be leaving the club following the ending of his loan. At his time with Podbrezová, he played 13 games in the fall, keeping six clean sheets and contributing nineteen of Podbrezová's 21 points in the fall.

=== Trial to MFK Košice ===
After his time with Podbrezová, Maťašovský joined MFK Košice on trial. His contract with the club would be terminated following an injury to his back. The club justified his termination by stating that he did not sit in the stands during the match of the 18th round against Ružomberok. Maťašovský justified his absence with a doctor's recommendation, but the club owner allegedly did not accept his excuse.
