= Denis Čery =

Slovak footballer

Personal information
- Full name: Denis Čery
- Date of birth: 1 August 1994 (age 32)
- Place of birth: Slovakia
- Height: 1.74 m (5 ft 9 in)
- Position: Midfielder

Team information
- Current team: Zvolen
- Number: 14

Youth career
- Nitra

Senior career*
Years	Team	Apps	(Gls)
2012–2018	Nitra	15	(0)
2014	→ Piešťany (loan)		
2015	→ Rimavská Sobota (loan)	10	(1)
2015	→ Sereď (loan)	17	(1)
2016–2017	→ Lokomotíva Zvolen (loan)	4	(1)
2018	→ Tatran Liptovský Mikuláš (loan)	12	(1)
2018–2020	Tatran Liptovský Mikuláš	43	(1)
2020–	FC Petržalka	0	(0)

International career^{‡}
2010–2011	Slovakia U17	4	(0)
2012	Slovakia U19	3	(0)
- * Club domestic league appearances and goals as of 16 July 2020 ‡ National team caps and goals as of 16 October 2012

Denis Čery (born 1 August 1994) is a Slovak football midfielder who currently plays for FC Petržalka.

== FC Nitra ==
He made his debut for Nitra against Ružomberok on 21 July 2012.
