= Lukáš Ondrek =

Slovak footballer

Personal information
- Full name: Lukáš Ondrek
- Date of birth: 11 January 1993 (age 33)
- Place of birth: Slovakia
- Height: 1.79 m (5 ft 10 in)
- Position: Right back

Team information
- Current team: Tatran Oravské Veselé

Youth career
- Dolný Kubín
- Ružomberok

Senior career*
Years	Team	Apps	(Gls)
2011–2020	Ružomberok B	?	(?)
2011–2019	Ružomberok	34	(0)
2014	→ Rimavská Sobota (loan)	6	(0)
2016	→ Fomat Martin (loan)	10	(1)
2017–2019	→ Tatran Liptovský Mikuláš (loan)	53	(3)
2020–	Tatran Oravské Veselé	20	(0)

International career
- Slovakia U15
- Slovakia U16
2011	Slovakia U19	2	(0)
	Slovakia U21	1	(0)
- * Club domestic league appearances and goals as of 25 February 2022

Lukáš Ondrek (born 11 January 1993) is a Slovak football defender who currently plays for Tatran Oravské Veselé.

== MFK Ružomberok ==
He made his Fortuna Liga debut for Ružomberok against Senica on 21 May 2011.
