= Viktor Mojžiš =

Slovak footballer

Personal information
- Full name: Viktor Mojžiš
- Date of birth: 2 January 1999 (age 27)
- Place of birth: Krupina, Slovakia
- Position: Midfielder

Team information
- Current team: Prameň Kováčová
- Number: 8

Youth career
- 2007–2010: OTJ Hontianske Nemce
- 2010–2017: Dukla Banská Bystrica
- 2017–2018: Železiarne Podbrezová

Senior career*
Years	Team	Apps	(Gls)
2018–2020	Železiarne Podbrezová	6	(0)
2020–	Prameň Kováčová	8	(1)
- * Club domestic league appearances and goals as of 29 September 2020

Viktor Mojžiš (born 2 January 1999) is a professional Slovak footballer who currently plays for Prameň Kováčová as a midfielder in the Tipos 3. Liga.

== Club career ==
Viktor has twin brother Alexander, who is signed to Ružomberok.

=== FK Železiarne Podbrezová ===
Viktor Mojžiš made his professional Fortuna Liga debut for Železiarne Podbrezová against ViOn Zlaté Moravce on 10 March 2018, in a 1:0 away victory. He came on as a replacement for Matúš Mikuš, who got injured, after half an hour of play, but was substituted by Illia Tereshchenko with 15 minutes left. Podbrezová had won after a penalty goal by Dávid Leško from the 82nd minute.
