= Filip Halgoš =

Slovak footballer

Personal information
- Full name: Filip Halgoš
- Date of birth: 9 March 1998 (age 28)
- Place of birth: Trenčín, Slovakia
- Height: 1.68 m (5 ft 6 in)
- Position: Midfielder

Team information
- Current team: Viktoria Žižkov
- Number: 24

Youth career
- –2009: TTS Trenčín
- 2009–2016: AS Trenčín

Senior career*
Years	Team	Apps	(Gls)
2016–2018	AS Trenčín	13	(0)
2018	→ Tatran Liptovský Mikuláš (loan)	11	(1)
2018–	Viktoria Žižkov	4	(0)
2019	→ Železiarne Podbrezová (loan)	6	(0)

International career
2015	Slovakia U17	3	(0)
- * Club domestic league appearances and goals as of 23:05, 26 November 2019 (UTC)

Filip Halgoš (born 9 March 1998) is a Slovak football midfielder who currently plays for FK Viktoria Žižkov.

== Club career ==
=== AS Trenčín ===
Halgoš made his professional Fortuna Liga debut for AS Trenčín against MFK Ružomberok on 21 August 2016.
