= Pentecost Ikedinachi Obiechina =

Nigerian footballer

Personal information
- Full name: Pentecost Ikedinachi Obiechina
- Date of birth: 13 March 1998 (age 28)
- Place of birth: Nigeria
- Position: Midfielder

Team information
- Current team: Prameň Kováčová
- Number: 10

Senior career*
| Years | Team | Apps | (Gls) |
| –2017 | Lagos Islanders | | |
| 2017–2018 | Inter Bratislava | 1 | (0) |
| 2017 | → Senica (loan) | 4 | (0) |
| 2018 | FC Strání | | |
| 2018 | Znojmo | 2 | (0) |
| 2018 | → Viktoria Otrokovice (loan) | 7 | (0) |
| 2019– | Prameň Kováčová | 4 | (0) |
- * Club domestic league appearances and goals as of 2 June 2020

Pentecost Ikedinachi Obiechina (born 13 March 1998) is a Nigerian footballer who plays as midfielder for Slovak club Prameň Kováčová.

== Career ==
=== FK Senica ===
Obiechina made his Fortuna Liga debut for Senica against Slovan Bratislava on 4 August 2017, playing the entire duration of the 1:1 draw.

=== Czech Republic ===
In March 2018, Obiechina revealed on Instagram, that he was playing for Czech club FC Strani. In July 2018, he joined Znojmo. However, after playing two games for the club, he was loaned out to FC Viktoria Otrokovice for the rest of the year, only two months after signing with Znojmo.

=== Return to Slovakia ===
In the summer 2019, he returned to Slovakia and signed with Prameň Kováčová playing in the 3. Liga (Central).
