= Lukáš Kučera =

Slovak footballer

Personal information
- Full name: Lukáš Kučera
- Date of birth: 18 April 2000 (age 26)
- Place of birth: Slovakia
- Height: 1.75 m (5 ft 9 in)
- Position: Defender

Youth career
- Senica

Senior career*
Years	Team	Apps	(Gls)
2017–	Senica	23	(0)

International career^{‡}
2015–2016	Slovakia U16		
2018	Slovakia U19	4	(0)
- * Club domestic league appearances and goals as of 7 March 2023 ‡ National team caps and goals as of 1 June 2017

Lukáš Kučera (born 18 April 2000) is a Slovak professional footballer who recently played for Senica in the Fortuna liga.

He made his senior league debut for Senica on 13 May 2017 in their Fortuna Liga 3–2 away loss at Žilina.

He also represented the Slovakia under-16 national team.
