= Viktor Jedinák =

Slovak footballer

Personal information
- Full name: Viktor Jedinák
- Date of birth: 8 February 1998 (age 28)
- Place of birth: Slovakia
- Position: Forward

Youth career
- 2012: Goral Stará Ľubovňa
- 2012–2016: Senica

Senior career*
Years	Team	Apps	(Gls)
2016	Senica	4	(0)
2017–2018	Železiarne Podbrezová	13	(1)
2018–2021	Ružomberok	14	(1)
2020–2021	→ Petržalka (loan)	18	(3)

International career^{‡}
- Slovakia U16
	Slovakia U18	3	(0)
2016–2017	Slovakia U19	7	(3)
- * Club domestic league appearances and goals as of 25 February 2022 ‡ National team caps and goals as of 11 October 2016

Viktor Jedinák (born 8 February 1998) is a Slovak footballer who last played for Petržalka as a forward.

== Club career ==
=== FK Senica ===
Jedinák made his professional Fortuna Liga debut for Senica on 20 May 2016 against Spartak Myjava in a 1–1 tie, substituting future Slovak international Samuel Mráz in the 86th minute.
