= Nicolas Mejri =

Slovak footballer

Personal information
- Date of birth: 27 May 2000 (age 26)
- Place of birth: Prague, Czech Republic
- Position: Midfielder

Team information
- Current team: Prameň Kováčová

Youth career
- –2017: Železiarne Podbrezová

Senior career*
| Years | Team | Apps | (Gls) |
| 2017–2020 | Železiarne Podbrezová | 21 | (3) |
| 2020– | Prameň Kováčová | 8 | (1) |

International career
- Slovakia U18
- * Club domestic league appearances and goals as of 29 September 2020

Nicolas Mejri (born 27 May 2000) is a Slovak footballer who plays for ŠK Prameň Kováčová as a midfielder.

== Club career ==
=== Železiarne Podbrezová ===
Mejri made his Fortuna Liga debut for Železiarne Podbrezová against Nitra on 9 December 2017. He replaced Endy Bernadina some 13 minutes before the end and had contributed to defending the 1-0 lead from the first half.
