= Jakub Więzik =

Polish footballer

Personal information
- Full name: Jakub Więzik
- Date of birth: 15 July 1991 (age 35)
- Place of birth: Bielsko-Biała, Poland
- Height: 1.95 m (6 ft 5 in)
- Position: Forward

Team information
- Current team: SG Sachsenbrunn/Crock

Youth career
- 2006–2008: Podbeskidzie Bielsko-Biała
- 2009–2011: Śląsk Wrocław

Senior career*
Years	Team	Apps	(Gls)
2011–2014	Śląsk Wrocław	10	(0)
2011–2012	→ KS Polkowice (loan)	20	(2)
2012	→ ŁKS Łódź (loan)	16	(4)
2014	→ Pogoń Siedlce (loan)	8	(0)
2014–2016	Carl Zeiss Jena	34	(9)
2015–2017	Meuselwitz	22	(4)
2017	Tatran Prešov	18	(1)
2018–2019	Železiarne Podbrezová	31	(3)
2019–2020	Spójnia Landek	16	(4)
2023–	SG Sachsenbrunn/Crock		
- * Club domestic league appearances and goals as of 15 July 2024

Jakub Więzik (born 15 July 1991) is a Polish professional footballer who plays as a forward for SG Sachsenbrunn/Crock. Besides Spójnia, he has played for Śląsk Wrocław, Polkowice, ŁKS Łódź, Pogoń Siedlce, Carl Zeiss Jena, Meuselwitz, Tatran Prešov and Železiarne Podbrezová.

== Personal life ==
He is a son of a Polish footballer Grzegorz Więzik.
