= Filip Ďuriš =

Slovak footballer (born 1995)

Personal information
- Date of birth: 28 March 1995 (age 31)
- Place of birth: Bratislava, Slovakia
- Height: 1.92 m (6 ft 4 in)
- Position: Forward

Team information
- Current team: Slovan Bratislava

Youth career
- Senec
- Inter Bratislava
- Slovan Bratislava

Senior career*
Years	Team	Apps	(Gls)
2014–	Slovan Bratislava	13	(0)
2014–2016	→ Slovan Bratislava II	45	(14)
2016	→ Zavrč (loan)	0	(0)
2017–	→ Senica (loan)	6	(1)

International career^{‡}
- Slovakia U16
2011	Slovakia U17	3	(2)
2015–	Slovakia U21	3	(1)
- * Club domestic league appearances and goals as of 13 January 2018 ‡ National team caps and goals as of 15 December 2015

Filip Ďuriš (born 28 March 1995) is a Slovak footballer who plays as a forward for Slovan Bratislava.

== Club career ==
Ďuriš made his Fortuna Liga's debut for ŠK Slovan Bratislava on 30 November 2014 entering in as a substitute in place of Igor Žofčák against FK Dukla Banská Bystrica.
