= Rômulo (footballer, born 1992) =

Brazilian footballer

Personal information
- Full name: Rômulo Silva Santos
- Date of birth: 1 November 1992 (age 34)
- Place of birth: Marabá, Brazil
- Height: 1.77 m (5 ft 10 in)
- Position: Forward

Team information
- Current team: SV Stockerau

Youth career
- IAPE
- 2005–2009: Juventude
- 2010–2011: Leixões

Senior career*
Years	Team	Apps	(Gls)
2010–2011	Leixões	0	(0)
2011–2012	Vizela	19	(3)
2012	Tourizense	3	(0)
2013	Esportivo Bento Gonçalves	0	(0)
2013	Maringá		
2014	São José	9	(1)
2014	Itumbiara		
2014	Bragantino		
2015	Bodva Moldava nad Bodvou		
2016	Operário		
2016	Haniska	15	(11)
2016–2018	Partizán Bardejov	38	(5)
2017	→ Senica (loan)	7	(0)
2019	Senglea Athletic	8	(2)
2019	Qormi	7	(1)
2020–2021	Bardejov	24	(4)
2021–2022	Trebišov	19	(0)
2022–	SV Stockerau		
- * Club domestic league appearances and goals as of 30 July 2022

Rômulo Silva Santos (born 1 November 1992) is a Brazilian footballer who plays as a forward for SV Stockerau.

== Career ==
Rômulo made his Fortuna Liga debut for Senica against AS Trenčín on 23 July 2017.
