= Marián Jarabica =

Slovak footballer

Personal information
- Date of birth: 27 April 1989 (age 37)
- Place of birth: Čadca, Czechoslovakia
- Height: 1.93 m (6 ft 4 in)
- Position: Centre-back

Youth career
- –2004: Čadca
- 2004–2008: Dukla Banská Bystrica

Senior career*
Years	Team	Apps	(Gls)
2009	Dukla Banská Bystrica	10	(0)
2009–2010	Dynamo České Budějovice	18	(1)
2010–2014	Cracovia	14	(1)
2011–2012	→ Ludogorets Razgrad (loan)	1	(0)
2014–	Čadca	8	(0)
2015	Pohronie	9	(0)
2015–2016	Frýdek-Místek	17	(0)
2016	Dukla Banská Bystrica	14	(0)
2017	ROW Rybnik	11	(1)
2017	Senica	11	(0)
2018	Čadca	29	(2)
2019–2021	FCU Gerersdorf-Ebersdorf	25	(3)
2021	Čadca	3	(0)
2021–2022	Tatran Krásno nad Kysucou	41	(5)
2023	Teplička nad Váhom	8	(0)
2023	Tatran Turzovka	12	(0)

International career
2008	Slovakia U19	3	(0)
2009–2010	Slovakia U21	5	(0)
- * Club domestic league appearances and goals

Marián Jarabica (Slovak pronunciation: [ˈmarijaːn ˈjarabitsa]; born 27 April 1989) is a Slovak former professional footballer who played as a centre-back. He ended his professional career due to injuries and continues in football at an amateur level.

== Club career ==
In the summer 2010, he joined Polish club Cracovia on a four-year contract. In June 2011, he was loaned to Bulgarian club Ludogorets Razgrad on a year deal.

In 2023, it was announced that Jarabica would be joining FK Tatran Turzovka. In an interview, Jarabica stated that he had quit professional football due to an injury in the ankle, which he had five unsuccessful surgeries to fix.

== International career ==
He was a part of Slovakia U19 and Slovakia U21 teams.

== Honours ==
Ludogorets Razgrad

- First Professional Football League: 2011–12
