= Lukáš Urminský =

Slovak footballer

Personal information
- Date of birth: 23 July 1992 (age 34)
- Place of birth: Prievidza, Czechoslovakia
- Position: Goalkeeper

Team information
- Current team: FK Tatran Turzovka

Youth career
- –2007: Snina
- 2007–2011: Prievidza
- 2010–2011: → Dubnica (loan)

Senior career*
Years	Team	Apps	(Gls)
2011–2014	Dubnica		
2011–2012	→ MFK Nová Dubnica (loan)		
2014–2017	Spartak Myjava	2	(0)
2016–2017	→ Pohronie (loan)	19	(0)
2017–2018	Pohronie	16	(0)
2018	Ružomberok	1	(0)
2019–	FK Tatran Turzovka		

International career
2011	Slovakia U19		
- * Club domestic league appearances and goals as of 17 January 2026

Lukáš Urminský (born 23 July 1992) is a Slovak professional football player who currently plays for 4. Liga club FK Tatran Turzovka, as a goalkeeper.

Urminský is a native of Prievidza, but he has also played for Dubnica and Myjava.

== Club career ==
=== Spartak Myjava ===
In 2014, Urminský joined first league side Spartak Myjava. In a May 2015 Fortuna Liga match against AS Trenčín, he was sent off in a 3–1 defeat. A few days later, the red card was annulled by the Slovak Football Association after an appeal by Spartak Myjava. In the winter of 2016, Urminský terminated his contract with Myjava by mutual agreement.

=== FK Pohronie ===
In 2017, Urminský permanently joined FK Pohronie after being on loan at the club a season before. He played in a 4–0 win against FK Slavoj Trebišov, keeping a clean sheet. While playing for Pohranie, Urminský set a record for most minutes without conceding a goal in the 2. Liga, keeping clean sheets in games against Šamorín, Skalica, Svätého Jur, Nitra, Žilina B and Banik Prievidza, helping Pohranie avoid relegation.

=== MFK Ružomberok ===
In the summer of 2018, Urminský joined first division side MFK Ružomberok. He made his league debut for MFK Ružomberok in a 3–0 away defeat to FC DAC 1904 Dunajská Streda, coming on as a substitute for Nermin Haskić in the 44th minute following a red card shown to goalkeeper Matúš Macík.

=== Later career ===
In 2019, Urminský joined 5. Liga side FK Tatran Turzovka. He helped the club advance to the 4th league in 2022.

== International career ==
In 2011, Urminský was nominated to play for the Slovakia U19 team in two friendly games against Belgium U19. Later that year, he was called up for the second round of the European Under-19 Championship held in Romania.
