= Diego Cuadros =

Colombian footballer (born 1996)

Personal information
- Full name: Diego Alejandro Cuadros Velásquez
- Date of birth: 28 May 1996 (age 30)
- Place of birth: Chigorodó, Colombia
- Height: 1.70 m (5 ft 7 in)
- Position: Midfielder

Team information
- Current team: Alianza Petrolera
- Number: 33

Senior career*
Years	Team	Apps	(Gls)
- Caracas
2015–2017	Jaguares de Córdoba	29	(1)
2018	→ Senica (loan)	8	(0)
2018	Senica	5	(0)
2019	AEZ Zakakiou	11	(3)
2019–	Alianza Petrolera	3	(0)
- * Club domestic league appearances and goals as of 23:12, 30 September 2019 (UTC)

Diego Alejandro Cuadros Velásquez (born 28 May 1996) is a Colombian footballer who currently plays as a midfielder for Alianza Petrolera.

== Club career ==
=== FK Senica ===
Diego Cuadros made his professional Fortuna Liga debut for Senica against Spartak Trnava on February 24, 2018.

After his loan spell at Senica, Cuadros joined the club permanently. But he was released at the end of 2018.

=== AEZ Zakakiou ===
On 31 January 2019, the Cyprus Football Association confirmed, that Cuadros had joined AEZ Zakakiou in the Cypriot Second Division.

=== Alianza Petrolera ===
In the summer 2019, Cuadros returned to Colombia and signed with Alianza Petrolera.
