= Víctor Salazar (footballer, born 1991) =

Colombian footballer

Luis Manuel Salazar
Personal information
- Full name: Luis Manuel Salazar
- Date of birth: 7 November 1997 (age 29)
- Place of birth: [[Cartagena], Colombia
- Height: 1.84 m (6 ft 0 in)
- Position: Forward
	→ Atlético Huila (loan)	1	(0)

Luis Manuel Salazar Montero (born Noviembre 07, 1997) is a Colombian professional footballer who plays as a forward.

== Career ==
Salazar is a product of the Atletico Huila youth system and played with the Atlético Huila first-team since 2014.
