= Naren Solano =

Colombian footballer (born 1996)

Personal information
- Full name: Naren Stiven Solano Perea
- Date of birth: 15 January 1996 (age 30)
- Place of birth: Cali, Colombia
- Height: 1.70 m (5 ft 7 in)
- Position: Forward

Senior career*
Years	Team	Apps	(Gls)
–2016	Independiente Medellín II		
2017	Boyacá Chicó	0	(0)
2018	→ Nové Mesto nad Váhom (loan)	9	(3)
2018	Senica	12	(1)
2019	Deportes Valdivia	10	(1)
- * Club domestic league appearances and goals as of 4 April 2020

Naren Stiven Solano Perea (born 15 January 1996) is a professional Colombian footballer who plays as a forward.

== Club career ==
=== FK Senica ===
Solano made his Fortuna Liga debut for Senica against Spartak Trnava on 21 July 2018.
