= Dávid Richtárech =

Slovak footballer

Personal information
- Date of birth: 22 April 1996 (age 30)
- Place of birth: Banská Bystrica, Slovakia
- Height: 1.72 m (5 ft 8 in)
- Position: Defensive midfielder

Team information
- Current team: Dukla Banská Bystrica
- Number: 6

Youth career
- 2011–2014: Spartak Bánovce nad Bebravou
- 2011–2014: → AS Trenčín (loan)
- 2014: AS Trenčín

Senior career*
Years	Team	Apps	(Gls)
2014–2018	AS Trenčín	0	(0)
2015	→ Slovan Nemšová (loan)		
2016	→ Inter Bratislava (loan)		
2016	→ Slovan Nemšová (loan)		
2017	→ Nové Mesto n. Váhom (loan)	13	(1)
2017–2018	→ Senica (loan)	26	(0)
2018–2019	→ ViOn Zlaté Moravce (loan)	18	(2)
2019–2020	ViOn Zlaté Moravce	20	(1)
2020–	Dukla Banská Bystrica	170	(6)
- * Club domestic league appearances and goals as of 21 September 2026

Dávid Richtárech (born 22 April 1996) is a Slovak footballer who plays as a midfielder for Dukla Banská Bystrica.

== Club career ==
=== FK Senica ===
Richtárech made his Fortuna Liga debut for Senica against AS Trenčín on 23 July 2017.
