= Michal Ranko =

Slovak footballer

Personal information
- Full name: Michal Ranko
- Date of birth: 19 February 1994 (age 32)
- Place of birth: Trenčín, Slovakia
- Height: 1.88 m (6 ft 2 in)
- Position: Centre-back

Youth career
- AS Trenčín

Senior career*
Years	Team	Apps	(Gls)
2013–2017	AS Trenčín	0	(0)
2013	→ Dubnica nad Váhom (loan)	16	(0)
2014–2015	→ Slovan Nemšová (loan)	57	(3)
2016	→ Nové Mesto nad Váhom (loan)	11	(0)
2016	→ ViOn Zlaté Moravce (loan)	12	(1)
2017	→ Senica (loan)	12	(1)
2017–2018	Senica	31	(2)
2018–2019	Motor Lublin	24	(1)
2020–2021	Skalica	32	(10)
2021–2023	Zemplín Michalovce	52	(2)
2023–2026	Skalica	39	(1)
- * Club domestic league appearances and goals as of 25 June 2025

Michal Ranko (born 19 February 1994) is a Slovak professional footballer who plays as a centre-back for Skalica.

== Club career ==
=== ViOn Zlaté Moravce ===
Ranko made his professional Fortuna Liga debut for ViOn Zlaté Moravce against AS Trenčín on 30 July 2016.

On 26 July 2018, he signed a contract with Motor Lublin.
