= Lukáš Mihálik (footballer, born 1997) =

Slovak footballer

Personal information
- Full name: Lukáš Mihálik
- Date of birth: 10 February 1997 (age 29)
- Place of birth: Piešťany, Slovakia
- Height: 1.79 m (5 ft 10 in)
- Position: Midfielder

Team information
- Current team: Traismauer
- Number: 6

Youth career
- Piešťany
- 2012–2015: Spartak Trnava

Senior career*
Years	Team	Apps	(Gls)
2015–2020	Spartak Trnava	32	(1)
2018	→ iClinic Sereď (loan)	4	(0)
2018–2019	→ Lokomotíva Košice (loan)	24	(2)
2019–2020	→ Slavoj Trebišov (loan)	13	(0)
2020–2021	Kisvárda FC II	30	(0)
2021–2022	Oed/Zeillern	14	(2)
2022–2023	St. Pantaleon	26	(4)
2023–	Traismauer	1	(0)

International career
2015–2016	Slovakia U18	3	(0)
2015–2016	Slovakia U19	7	(0)
- * Club domestic league appearances and goals as of 22:12, 28 November 2019 (UTC)

Lukáš Mihálik (born 10 February 1997) is a Slovak footballer who plays as a midfielder.

== Club career ==
=== Spartak Trnava ===
Mihálik made his professional debut for Spartak in a 2–1 win against Skalica on 6 November 2015. In February 2016, he signed his first professional contract for 3 seasons. He scored his first goal for the club in a 2–2 draw against FC ViOn Zlaté Moravce, scoring in the 15th minute to level the score at 1–1.

In the winter of 2018, it was announced that Mihálik would be loaned out to 2. Liga side, ŠKF Sereď. He helped the club get promoted to the Slovak First Football League for the first time in their history.

== Personal life ==
His father, Ľuboš, was a youth coach in PFK Piešťany, later at the Róbert Hank Academy in Moravany nad Váhom. He died to a serious illness in 2014, at the age of 48.
