= Marek Rigo =

Slovak footballer

Personal information
- Date of birth: 15 December 1997 (age 28)
- Place of birth: Bratislava, Slovakia
- Height: 1.75 m (5 ft 9 in)
- Position: Attacking midfielder

Team information
- Current team: SC Neusiedl See
- Number: 10

Youth career
- FC Podunajské Biskupice
- Ružinov
- Slovan Bratislava

Senior career*
Years	Team	Apps	(Gls)
2016–2019	Slovan Bratislava	13	(0)
2017	→ Senica (loan)	15	(0)
2018	→ Zlaté Moravce (loan)	5	(0)
2019–2021	Komárno	15	(0)
2020–2021	→ Slovan Bratislava B (loan)	24	(1)
2021–2022	Wiener Viktoria	24	(5)
2022–2023	Traiskirchen	29	(2)
2023	Slovan Bratislava B	9	(1)
2024–	SC Neusiedl See	67	(7)
- * Club domestic league appearances and goals as of 28 June 2026

Marek Rigo (born 15 December 1997) is a Slovak footballer who plays as an attacking midfielder for SC Neusiedl See.

== Club career ==
Marek Rigo made his professional Fortuna Liga's debut for ŠK Slovan Bratislava on September 10, 2016 against Spartak Myjava.
