= Zoltán Kontár =

Slovak footballer

Personal information
- Full name: Zoltán Kontár
- Date of birth: 7 November 1993 (age 33)
- Place of birth: Dunajská Streda, Slovakia
- Height: 1.72 m (5 ft 8 in)
- Positions: Defensive midfielder; full-back

Team information
- Current team: FC Langenthal
- Number: 19

Youth career
- –2008: DSC Orechová Potôň
- 2008–2012: Petržalka

Senior career*
Years	Team	Apps	(Gls)
2012–2016	Petržalka		
2014	→ Šamorín (loan)	15	(2)
2015	→ Ružinov (loan)	11	(3)
2015–2016	→ Senica (loan)	23	(0)
2016–2018	Dunajská Streda	16	(1)
2018–2020	Gyirmót	24	(1)
2020	Petržalka	1	(0)
2020–	FC Langenthal	10	(1)
- * Club domestic league appearances and goals as of 19:43, 18 July 2021 (UTC)

Zoltán Kontár (born 7 November 1993) is a Slovak professional footballer who plays for Swiss club FC Langenthal as a midfielder or defender.

== Club career ==
On 13 July 2015, FK Senica signed Kontár on one year-loan from FC Petržalka akadémia. At the age of 21, he made his professional debut for FK Senica against FC DAC 1904 Dunajská Streda on 18 July 2015.
