= Issa Adekunle =

Nigerian footballer (born 1997)

Personal information
- Full name: Usman Issa Adekunle
- Date of birth: 20 December 1997 (age 28)
- Place of birth: Yenagoa, Nigeria
- Height: 1.77 m (5 ft 10 in)
- Position: Winger

Team information
- Current team: Bashkimi

Youth career
- GBS Academy

Senior career*
Years	Team	Apps	(Gls)
2017–2021	AS Trenčín	6	(1)
2017	→ Tatran Prešov (loan)	17	(1)
2018–2019	→ Inter Bratislava (loan)	39	(12)
2020–2021	Slavoj Trebišov	25	(9)
2021–2022	Železiarne Podbrezová	27	(1)
2022–2025	Michalovce	58	(9)
2025–	Bashkimi	3	(0)
- * Club domestic league appearances and goals as of 13 September 2025

Issa Adekunle (born 20 December 1997) is a Nigerian footballer who plays as winger.

== Career ==
Adekunle made his professional Fortuna Liga debut for AS Trenčín against Slovan Bratislava on 25 February 2016. Slovan won the game 4:3. Adekunle played the entire 90 minutes of the match. During his time at Trenčín, he made 6 league appearances and scored 1 goal
