= Joan Herrera (footballer) =

Colombian footballer (born 1994)

Personal information
- Full name: Joan Sebastián Jaramillo Herrera
- Date of birth: April 14, 1994 (age 32)
- Place of birth: Cali, Colombia
- Height: 1.78 m (5 ft 10 in)
- Position: Right back

Senior career*
Years	Team	Apps	(Gls)
2013	Universitario de Popayán	2	(0)
2014	Boyacá Chicó	17	(0)
2016	Iskra Borčice	6	(0)
2016–2017	Žilina B	36	(3)
2016–2017	Žilina	2	(0)
2018–2019	Senica	18	(0)
- * Club domestic league appearances and goals as of 31 May 2019 ‡ National team caps and goals as of 9 February 2016

Joan Sebastián Jaramillo Herrera (born 14 April 1994) is a Colombian footballer.

== Career ==
=== FK Iskra Borčice ===
He came to Iskra Borčice in Winter 2016, helping to achieve the highest football tier in Slovakia.

=== MŠK Žilina ===
On 27 May 2016, MŠK Žilina announced signing of Joan Herrera, on a half year contract with option to buy.
