= Róbert Gešnábel =

Slovak footballer

Personal information
- Full name: Róbert Gešnábel
- Date of birth: 24 November 1991 (age 34)
- Place of birth: Partizánske, Czechoslovakia
- Height: 1.73 m (5 ft 8 in)
- Positions: Forward; winger

Youth career
- Spartak Bánovce nad Bebravou
- 2006–2009: → AS Trenčín (loan)

Senior career*
Years	Team	Apps	(Gls)
2009–2012	Topvar Topoľčany		
2012	→ Slovan Duslo Šaľa (loan)	16	(2)
2013–2015	Slovan Duslo Šaľa	74	(17)
2016–2017	ViOn Zlaté Moravce	48	(9)
2018	Ružomberok	11	(2)
- * Club domestic league appearances and goals as of 8 June 2018

Róbert Gešnábel (born 24 November 1991) is a professional Slovak footballer who last played for Fortuna Liga club MFK Ružomberok as a forward.

== Club career ==
=== FC ViOn Zlaté Moravce ===
Gešnábel made his professional Fortuna Liga debut for FC ViOn Zlaté Moravce on 6 March 2016 against FC Spartak Trnava.
