= Ricardo Villarraga =

Colombian footballer (born 1990)

Personal information
- Full name: Ricardo José Villarraga Marchena
- Date of birth: 23 April 1990 (age 36)
- Place of birth: Bogotá, Colombia
- Height: 1.83 m (6 ft 0 in)
- Position: Left-back

Team information
- Current team: FK Senica
- Number: 4

Youth career
- Santa Fe

Senior career*
Years	Team	Apps	(Gls)
2007–2015	Santa Fe	72	(1)
2007–2008	→ Atlético Juventud (loan)		
2012–2013	→ América de Cali (loan)	1	(0)
2016	Deportivo Pasto	21	(1)
2017–	Atlético Huila	4	(0)
2018–	→ Senica (loan)	9	(0)

International career^{‡}
2007	Colombia U17	2	(0)
- * Club domestic league appearances and goals as of 7 June 2018 ‡ National team caps and goals as of 30 August 2007

Ricardo José Villarraga Marchena (born 23 April 1990) is a Colombian footballer who plays as a defender for Fortuna Liga club FK Senica, on loan from Atlético Huila.

== Club career ==
=== FK Senica ===
Ricardo Villarraga made his professional Fortuna Liga debut for FK Senica against FC ViOn Zlaté Moravce on March 31, 2018.
