= List of Slovak football transfers winter 2016–17 =

Notable Slovak football transfers in the winter transfer window 2016–17 by club. Only transfers of the Fortuna Liga and DOXXbet liga are included.

== Fortuna Liga ==
=== AS Trenčín ===
In:

No.	Pos.	Nation	Player
—	MF	NED	Desley Ubbink (from Free Agent)
—	FW	NGR	Issa Adekunle (from (Nigeria) GBS Academy)
—	FW	NGR	Hilary Gong (from (Nigeria) GBS Academy)
—	MF	NGR	Abdul Zubairu (from (Nigeria) GBS Academy)
—	FW	GEO	Giorgi Beridze (on loan from (Belgium) Gent II)
—	FW	BIH	Hamza Čataković (on loan from (Bosnia and Herzegovina) FK Sarajevo)
—	FW	CRO	Antonio Mance (from (Slovenia) NK Domžale)
—	FW	NED	Milton Klooster (from (Netherlands) NEC)
—	DF	NED	Rodney Klooster (from (Netherlands) NEC)
—	MF	BRA	Pedro Colina (from AS Trenčín youth)
—	DF	TTO	Keston Julien (from (Trinidad and Tobago) San Juan Jabloteh)

Out:

No.	Pos.	Nation	Player
17	FW	NGR	Samuel Kalu (to (Belgium) Gent)
—	MF	NGR	Reuben Gabriel (Released)
—	FW	NED	Jamarro Diks (Released and joined (Netherlands) GVVV)
—	MF	SVK	Matúš Opatovský (Released)
—	MF	CHN	Congyao Yin (Released)
—	DF	BRA	Rafael (Released)
—	FW	NED	Chisom Leonard Johnson (Released)
—	DF	NED	Jeffrey Ket (Released and joined (Romania) CS Pandurii Târgu Jiu)
—	MF	ARG	Aldo Baéz
—	FW	SVK	Erik Mikeš (on loan to (Malta) Mosta)
27	MF	SVK	Denis Jančo (on loan to (Poland) Górnik Zabrze)
7	FW	NGR	Aliko Bala (to (Belgium) Zulte Waregem)
—	MF	SVK	Dávid Richtárech (on loan to AFC Nové Mesto nad Váhom)
—	MF	CHN	Cong Huang (Released)
—	FW	COL	Pedro Barrios (Released)

=== ŠK Slovan Bratislava ===
In: Note: Flags indicate national team as defined under FIFA eligibility rules; some limited exceptions apply. Players may hold more than one non-FIFA nationality.

No.	Pos.	Nation	Player
—	FW	UKR	Illia Tereshchenko (on loan from MFK Zemplín Michalovce)
—	DF	ARG	Vernon De Marco (from MFK Zemplín Michalovce)
—	MF	SVK	Tomáš Kóňa (from Spartak Myjava)
—	FW	SVK	Róbert Vittek (from Free Agent)
—	MF	SRB	Uroš Damnjanović (from (Serbia) FK Partizan)

Out: Note: Flags indicate national team as defined under FIFA eligibility rules; some limited exceptions apply. Players may hold more than one non-FIFA nationality.

No.	Pos.	Nation	Player
—	MF	RSA	Granwald Scott (Released and joined (South Africa) Bidvest Wits F.C.)
—	DF	GRE	Vasileios Pliatsikas (Released and joined (Greece) Panionios)
—	DF	NED	Lorenzo Burnet (on loan to (Netherlands) NEC)
—	DF	ARG	Vernon De Marco (loan return to MFK Zemplín Michalovce)
—	DF	SVK	Tomáš Filipiak (to (Italy) Udinese Calcio)
—	DF	SVK	Juraj Kotula (on loan to FK Senica)

=== Spartak Myjava ===
In: Note: Flags indicate national team as defined under FIFA eligibility rules; some limited exceptions apply. Players may hold more than one non-FIFA nationality.

No.	Pos.	Nation	Player

Out: Note: Flags indicate national team as defined under FIFA eligibility rules; some limited exceptions apply. Players may hold more than one non-FIFA nationality.

No.	Pos.	Nation	Player
—	DF	SVK	Martin Černáček (to FC Neded)
—	FW	SVK	Štefan Pekár (to (Czech Republic) FC Baník Ostrava)
—	DF	CZE	Petr Pavlík (to (Czech Republic) FC Zbrojovka Brno)
—	MF	SVK	Frederik Bilovský (to (Czech Republic) FK Dukla Prague)
—	FW	SVK	Roman Sabler (loan return to FC DAC 1904 Dunajská Streda)
—	FW	SVK	Peter Sládek (to (Poland) Podbeskidzie Bielsko-Biała)
—	MF	SVK	Ľuboš Kolár (to (Poland) Podbeskidzie Bielsko-Biała)
—	MF	SVK	Marek Jastráb (to TBA)
—	DF	SRB	Ivan Ostojić (to (Cyprus) Karmiotissa FC)
—	DF	SVK	Jaroslav Machovec (to (Poland) GKS Tychy)
—	MF	SVK	Tomáš Kóňa (to ŠK Slovan Bratislava)
—	DF	BIH	Adi Mehremić (to (Austria) SKN St. Pölten)
—	DF	SVK	Lukáš Beňo (to AFC Nové Mesto nad Váhom)
—	MF	SVK	Denis Duga (to (Czech Republic) Vlašim)
—	FW	SVK	Šimon Šmehýl (to FK Dukla Banská Bystrica)
—	DF	SVK	Patrik Banovič
—	MF	SVK	Patrik Abrahám (to FC Nitra)
—	DF	SVK	Ivan Múdry
—	GK	SVK	Matúš Hruška (to (Czech Republic) FK Dukla Prague)
—	MF	SVK	Vladimír Kukoľ (to FK Poprad)
—	GK	SVK	Libor Koníček (to ŠKF Sereď)

=== FC Spartak Trnava ===
In: Note: Flags indicate national team as defined under FIFA eligibility rules; some limited exceptions apply. Players may hold more than one non-FIFA nationality.

No.	Pos.	Nation	Player
—	MF	BRA	Kerlon (Free Agent)
—	FW	AUT	Kubilay Yilmaz (from (Czech Republic) 1. SC Znojmo)

Out: Note: Flags indicate national team as defined under FIFA eligibility rules; some limited exceptions apply. Players may hold more than one non-FIFA nationality.

No.	Pos.	Nation	Player
—	FW	CIV	Kouakou Privat Yao (on loan to FC ViOn Zlaté Moravce)
—	FW	SVK	Matúš Paukner (to ŠKF Sereď)
—	MF	SVK	Róbert Richnák (to ŠKF Sereď)
—	MF	FRA	Loïc Gagnon (Released)
—	MF	SVK	Martin Mikovič (to (Poland) Bruk-Bet Termalica Nieciecza)

=== MŠK Žilina ===
In: Note: Flags indicate national team as defined under FIFA eligibility rules; some limited exceptions apply. Players may hold more than one non-FIFA nationality.

No.	Pos.	Nation	Player
—	FW	SVK	Lukáš Čmelík (loan return from (Switzerland) FC Sion)
—	MF	LTU	Eligijus Jankauskas (from (Lithuania) Sūduva)
—	FW	SVK	Samuel Mráz (from FK Senica)
—	FW	AZE	Ramil Sheydayev (on loan from (Turkey) Trabzonspor)

Out: Note: Flags indicate national team as defined under FIFA eligibility rules; some limited exceptions apply. Players may hold more than one non-FIFA nationality.

No.	Pos.	Nation	Player
28	MF	GER	Christopher Mandiangu (Released and joined (Austria) FC Blau-Weiß Linz)
—	FW	SVK	Lukáš Čmelík (on loan to (Poland) Piast Gliwice)
—	DF	SVK	Branislav Šušolík (on loan to FK Senica)
—	FW	BIH	Nermin Haskić (on loan to (Poland) Podbeskidzie Bielsko-Biała)

=== MFK Ružomberok ===
In: Note: Flags indicate national team as defined under FIFA eligibility rules; some limited exceptions apply. Players may hold more than one non-FIFA nationality.

No.	Pos.	Nation	Player
—	FW	SVK	Štefan Gerec (loan return from MFK Tatran Liptovský Mikuláš)
—	MF	SVK	Dalibor Takáč (from FC VSS Košice)

Out: Note: Flags indicate national team as defined under FIFA eligibility rules; some limited exceptions apply. Players may hold more than one non-FIFA nationality.

No.	Pos.	Nation	Player
—	DF	SVK	Kristián Kolčák (to (Hungary) Gyirmót)
—	MF	SVK	Martin Chrien (loan return to (Czech Republic) FC Viktoria Plzeň)
—	MF	SVK	Juraj Vavrík (Released)
—	MF	SVK	Richard Bartoš (Released)
—	MF	SVK	Miroslav Almaský (Released)

=== FC DAC 1904 Dunajská Streda ===
In: Note: Flags indicate national team as defined under FIFA eligibility rules; some limited exceptions apply. Players may hold more than one non-FIFA nationality.

No.	Pos.	Nation	Player
—	FW	SVK	Jakub Kosorin (from Free Agent)
—	FW	SVK	Roman Sabler (loan return from Spartak Myjava)
—	DF	SVK	Ľubomír Šatka (on loan from (England) Newcastle United)
—	FW	SVK	Pavol Šafranko (from 1. FC Tatran Prešov)
—	GK	SVK	Benjamín Száraz (from FK Senica)
—	MF	ALB	Esmerald Aluku (from (Albania) FC Lapraka)
—	FW	HUN	Bence Mervó (from (Switzerland) FC Sion)

Out: Note: Flags indicate national team as defined under FIFA eligibility rules; some limited exceptions apply. Players may hold more than one non-FIFA nationality.

No.	Pos.	Nation	Player
—	FW	SVK	Róbert Polievka (on loan to FO ŽP Šport Podbrezová)
—	FW	SVK	Ákos Szarka (to (Hungary) Diósgyőri VTK)
—	FW	LAT	Valērijs Šabala (loan return to (Belgium) Club Brugge KV)

=== FO ŽP Šport Podbrezová ===
In: Note: Flags indicate national team as defined under FIFA eligibility rules; some limited exceptions apply. Players may hold more than one non-FIFA nationality.

No.	Pos.	Nation	Player
—	FW	SVK	Viktor Jedinák (from FK Senica) youth
—	GK	SVK	Samuel Vavrúš (from AS Trenčín) youth
—	MF	SVK	Jakub Sedláček (from AS Trenčín) youth
—	FW	SVK	Róbert Polievka (on loan from FC DAC 1904 Dunajská Streda)
—	FW	SVK	Matúš Mikuš (from Free Agent)
—	FW	ROU	Marius Alexe (on loan from (Turkey) Kardemir Karabükspor)
—	MF	CRO	Luka Pejović (from (Croatia) FC Lučko)
—	MF	SVK	Filip Lepieš (from FK Senica) youth

Out: Note: Flags indicate national team as defined under FIFA eligibility rules; some limited exceptions apply. Players may hold more than one non-FIFA nationality.

No.	Pos.	Nation	Player
—	FW	SVK	Pavol Šafranko (loan return to 1. FC Tatran Prešov)
—	MF	SVK	Juraj Pančík (on loan to FC ŠTK 1914 Šamorín)
—	DF	SVK	Ivan Očenáš (on loan to MFK Tatran Liptovský Mikuláš)
—	GK	SVK	Branislav Pavol (on loan to MFK Žarnovica)
—	MF	SVK	Peter Szczepaniak
—	MF	SVK	René Duda

=== FC ViOn Zlaté Moravce ===
In: Note: Flags indicate national team as defined under FIFA eligibility rules; some limited exceptions apply. Players may hold more than one non-FIFA nationality.

No.	Pos.	Nation	Player
—	FW	SVK	Erik Ujlaky (from Spartak Trnava juniori)
—	FW	CIV	Kouakou Privat Yao (on loan from Spartak Trnava juniori)
—	DF	SVK	Martin Chren (on loan from KFC Komárno)
—	FW	SRB	Samir Nurković (from FK Pohronie)
—	GK	SVK	Dominik Holec (on loan from MŠK Žilina II)
—	MF	CZE	Ondřej Machuča (on loan from (Czech Republic) FC Slovan Liberec)

Out: Note: Flags indicate national team as defined under FIFA eligibility rules; some limited exceptions apply. Players may hold more than one non-FIFA nationality.

No.	Pos.	Nation	Player
—	MF	SVK	Michal Obročník (loan return to (Czech Republic) FC Slovan Liberec)
—	DF	SVK	Michal Ranko (loan return to AS Trenčín)
—	DF	SVK	Denis Švec (Released)
—	MF	SVK	Jozef Rejdovian (Released)
—	DF	SVK	Jakub Kastelovič (Released)
—	FW	CAF	Jésus Konnsimbal (Released and joined (France) AS Saint-Priest)
—	MF	SVK	Jozef Sombat (loan return to ŠK Veľké Zálužie)

=== FK Senica ===
In: Note: Flags indicate national team as defined under FIFA eligibility rules; some limited exceptions apply. Players may hold more than one non-FIFA nationality.

No.	Pos.	Nation	Player
—	FW	CZE	Ondřej Šašinka (on loan from (Czech Republic) FC Baník Ostrava)
—	DF	CZE	Adam Pajer (on loan from (Czech Republic) FK Mladá Boleslav)
—	MF	SVK	Tomáš Brigant (on loan from (Czech Republic) FC Zbrojovka Brno)
—	FW	SVK	Boris Bališ (on loan from Spartak Trnava juniori)
—	MF	SVK	Viktor Miklós (from (Hungary) Ceglédi VSE)
—	FW	SVK	Alan Kováč (on loan from FC DAC 1904 Dunajská Streda)
—	DF	SVK	Branislav Šušolík (on loan from MŠK Žilina)
—	DF	SVK	Juraj Kotula (on loan from ŠK Slovan Bratislava)
—	DF	SVK	Michal Ranko (on loan from FK AS Trenčín)

Out: Note: Flags indicate national team as defined under FIFA eligibility rules; some limited exceptions apply. Players may hold more than one non-FIFA nationality.

No.	Pos.	Nation	Player
—	FW	SVK	Viktor Jedinák (to FO ŽP Šport Podbrezová)
—	DF	ESP	Alberto Delgado (Released)
—	MF	ESP	Pedro Astray (Released)
—	FW	CMR	Alain Ebwelle (Released)
—	MF	GHA	Paul Quaye (Released and joined (Spain) FC Jumilla)
—	DF	CZE	David Březina (loan return to (Czech Republic) AC Sparta Prague)
—	FW	SVK	Jakub Kosorin (to FC DAC 1904 Dunajská Streda)
—	GK	SVK	Benjamín Száraz (to FC DAC 1904 Dunajská Streda)
—	FW	SVK	Samuel Mráz (to MŠK Žilina)
—	MF	ESP	Pirulo (to (Bulgaria) PFC Cherno More Varna)
—	FW	ESP	Guille (to (Spain) RCD Espanyol B)
—	MF	ESP	Borja Docal (to (Belarus) FC Dinamo Brest)
—	DF	BRA	Weriton Luiz Gutierre

=== MFK Zemplín Michalovce ===
In: Note: Flags indicate national team as defined under FIFA eligibility rules; some limited exceptions apply. Players may hold more than one non-FIFA nationality.

No.	Pos.	Nation	Player
—	DF	ARG	Vernon De Marco (loan return from ŠK Slovan Bratislava)
—	DF	SVK	Peter Kavka (from (Czech Republic) FC Sellier&Bellot Vlašim)
—	MF	GRE	Anastasios Dimitriadis (on loan from (Greece) PAOK)
—	FW	SVK	Filip Serečin (from (Kazakhstan) FC Shakhter Karagandy)
—	FW	SVK	René Lukáč (from MFK Zemplín Michalovce youth)
—	MF	SVK	Peter Kolesár (from MFK Zemplín Michalovce youth)
—	FW	RUS	Vladislav Bragin (from (Russia) FC Krasnodar)
—	DF	GRE	Panagiotis Kontoes (from (Greece) Panegialios F.C.)

Out: Note: Flags indicate national team as defined under FIFA eligibility rules; some limited exceptions apply. Players may hold more than one non-FIFA nationality.

No.	Pos.	Nation	Player
—	FW	SVK	Dávid Škutka (Released)
—	MF	SVK	Ivan Kotora (Released)
—	DF	NGR	Celestine Lazarus (Released)
—	FW	UKR	Illia Tereshchenko (on loan to ŠK Slovan Bratislava)
—	DF	ARG	Vernon De Marco (to ŠK Slovan Bratislava)
—	FW	SVK	Dominik Kunca (to TBA)
—	DF	SVK	Oliver Podhorin (to TBA)
—	DF	ESP	Marcos (Released)
—	MF	GHA	Emmanuel Mensah (to (Albania) KF Laçi)

=== 1. FC Tatran Prešov ===
In: Note: Flags indicate national team as defined under FIFA eligibility rules; some limited exceptions apply. Players may hold more than one non-FIFA nationality.

No.	Pos.	Nation	Player
—	MF	SVK	Matej Grešák (from 1. FC Tatran Prešov youth)
—	MF	SVK	Jozef Špyrka (from 1. FC Tatran Prešov youth)
—	GK	SVK	Adrián Slančík (from 1. FC Tatran Prešov youth)
—	DF	SVK	Richard Župa (from 1. FC Tatran Prešov youth)
—	FW	SVK	Pavol Šafranko (loan return from FO ŽP Šport Podbrezová)
—	FW	SVK	Mojmír Trebuňák (from FC VSS Košice)
—	MF	SVK	Juraj Hovančík (on loan from FC VSS Košice)

Out: Note: Flags indicate national team as defined under FIFA eligibility rules; some limited exceptions apply. Players may hold more than one non-FIFA nationality.

No.	Pos.	Nation	Player
—	MF	NGR	Musefiu Ashiru (to (Czech Republic) FC Zbrojovka Brno)
—	GK	SVK	Denis Barát (Released)
—	GK	SVK	Pavol Penksa (Released)
—	FW	SVK	Pavol Šafranko (to FC DAC 1904 Dunajská Streda)
—	DF	SVK	Jozef Bujňák (on loan to ŠK Odeva Lipany)
—	MF	SVK	Slavomír Královič (on loan to ŠK Odeva Lipany)
—	DF	SVK	Dominik Jacko (on loan to Partizán Bardejov)
—	FW	NGR	Hector Tubonemi (on loan to FK Slavoj Trebišov)

== DOXXbet liga ==
=== MFK Skalica ===
In: Note: Flags indicate national team as defined under FIFA eligibility rules; some limited exceptions apply. Players may hold more than one non-FIFA nationality.

No.	Pos.	Nation	Player
—	MF	SVK	Blažej Vaščák (from FC Lokomotíva Košice)
—	MF	SRB	Filip Pankarićan (from FK Slovan Duslo Šaľa)
—	MF	SVK	Ádam Mészáros (from MŠK - Thermál Veľký Meder)

Out: Note: Flags indicate national team as defined under FIFA eligibility rules; some limited exceptions apply. Players may hold more than one non-FIFA nationality.

No.	Pos.	Nation	Player
—	DF	SVK	Timotej Záhumenský (on loan to FC ŠTK 1914 Šamorín)

=== ŠKF Sereď ===
In: Note: Flags indicate national team as defined under FIFA eligibility rules; some limited exceptions apply. Players may hold more than one non-FIFA nationality.

No.	Pos.	Nation	Player
—	FW	SVK	Matúš Paukner (from FC Spartak Trnava)
—	MF	SVK	Róbert Richnák (from FC Spartak Trnava)
—	GK	SVK	Libor Koníček (from Spartak Myjava)
—	DF	SVK	Marek Dubeň (from (Poland) Radomiak Radom)

Out: Note: Flags indicate national team as defined under FIFA eligibility rules; some limited exceptions apply. Players may hold more than one non-FIFA nationality.

No.	Pos.	Nation	Player
—	MF	SVK	Christián Steinhübel (to FC Nitra)
—	FW	UKR	Illya Cherednychenko (to Spartak Trnava juniori)
—	MF	SVK	Sinan Medgyes (to (Hungary) Györi Futball és Futsal SSS Kft.)
—	MF	SVK	Matej Kosorín (loan return to FK Senica)
—	GK	SVK	Štefan Senecký (Released)
—	FW	SVK	Alan Kováč (loan return to FC DAC 1904 Dunajská Streda)

=== FC ŠTK 1914 Šamorín ===
In: Note: Flags indicate national team as defined under FIFA eligibility rules; some limited exceptions apply. Players may hold more than one non-FIFA nationality.

No.	Pos.	Nation	Player
—	MF	SVK	Juraj Pančík (on loan from FO ŽP Šport Podbrezová)
—	DF	SVK	Timotej Záhumenský (on loan from MFK Skalica)
—	MF	BRA	Marlon Freitas (on loan from Fluminense FC)
—	DF	BRA	Alan Fialho (on loan from Fluminense FC)
—	MF	BRA	William Henrique (on loan from Fluminense FC)
—	FW	BRA	Estevão (on loan from Fluminense FC)

Out: Note: Flags indicate national team as defined under FIFA eligibility rules; some limited exceptions apply. Players may hold more than one non-FIFA nationality.

No.	Pos.	Nation	Player
—	DF	EIR	Nick Edginton (to (New Zealand) Team Wellington)
—	FW	BRA	Matheus Pato (loan return to (Brazil) Fluminense FC)
—	MF	BRA	Luiz Fernando (loan return to (Brazil) Fluminense FC)
—	FW	BRA	Danilo Mariotto (loan return to (Brazil) Fluminense FC)

=== AFC Nové Mesto nad Váhom ===
In: Note: Flags indicate national team as defined under FIFA eligibility rules; some limited exceptions apply. Players may hold more than one non-FIFA nationality.

No.	Pos.	Nation	Player
—	DF	SVK	Lukáš Beňo (from Spartak Myjava)
—	MF	SVK	Dominik Rolinec (on loan from AS Trenčín)
—	MF	SVK	Dávid Richtárech (on loan to AFC Nové Mesto nad Váhom)
—	MF	SVK	Rajmund Mikuš (on loan from MFK Nová Dubnica)

Out: Note: Flags indicate national team as defined under FIFA eligibility rules; some limited exceptions apply. Players may hold more than one non-FIFA nationality.

No.	Pos.	Nation	Player
—	MF	SVK	Marek Jastráb (loan return to Spartak Myjava)
—	MF	SVK	Marek Václav (to MFK Dubnica)

=== FC Spartak Trnava juniori ===
In: Note: Flags indicate national team as defined under FIFA eligibility rules; some limited exceptions apply. Players may hold more than one non-FIFA nationality.

No.	Pos.	Nation	Player
—	DF	SVK	Denis Horník (from FC Spartak Trnava)
—	MF	SVK	Filip Bango (from FC Spartak Trnava)
—	MF	SVK	Lukáš Mihálik (from FC Spartak Trnava)
—	DF	SVK	Ivan Cíferský (from (Czech Republic) FC MAS Táborsko)
—	FW	UKR	Illya Cherednychenko (from ŠKF Sereď)
—	DF	SVK	Erik Otrísal (from FK Senica)
—	MF	TUN	Nidhal Said (from Free Agent)
—	FW	SVK	Samuel Bielik (on loan from MŠK Púchov)

Out: Note: Flags indicate national team as defined under FIFA eligibility rules; some limited exceptions apply. Players may hold more than one non-FIFA nationality.

No.	Pos.	Nation	Player
—	MF	SVK	Erik Ujlaky (to FC ViOn Zlaté Moravce)
—	MF	SVK	Boris Bališ (on loan to FK Senica)
—	DF	SVK	Dušan Dzíbela (to MŠK - Thermál Veľký Meder)

=== FC VSS Košice ===
In: Note: Flags indicate national team as defined under FIFA eligibility rules; some limited exceptions apply. Players may hold more than one non-FIFA nationality.

No.	Pos.	Nation	Player
—	MF	SVK	Jaroslav Kolbas (from Družstevník Veľký Horeš)
—	DF	CMR	Patrick Ngoula (from (Cameroon) Astres FC)
—	MF	SRB	Nikola Ristovski (from (Serbia) FK Jedinstvo Ub)
—	FW	FRA	Bertrand Bebey (from (France) U.S. MUNICIPALE SARAN)

Out: Note: Flags indicate national team as defined under FIFA eligibility rules; some limited exceptions apply. Players may hold more than one non-FIFA nationality.

No.	Pos.	Nation	Player
—	MF	SVK	Dalibor Takáč (to MFK Ružomberok)
—	FW	SVK	Mojmír Trebuňák (to 1. FC Tatran Prešov)
—	GK	SLO	Marko Deronja (on loan to FK Haniska)
—	MF	SVK	Juraj Hovančík (on loan to 1. FC Tatran Prešov)

=== Partizán Bardejov ===
In: Note: Flags indicate national team as defined under FIFA eligibility rules; some limited exceptions apply. Players may hold more than one non-FIFA nationality.

No.	Pos.	Nation	Player
—	FW	SVK	Michal Hamuľak (from MFK Zemplín Michalovce)
—	MF	SVK	Dominik Jacko (on loan from 1. FC Tatran Prešov)
—	FW	BRA	Rômulo (from FK Haniska)

Out: Note: Flags indicate national team as defined under FIFA eligibility rules; some limited exceptions apply. Players may hold more than one non-FIFA nationality.

No.	Pos.	Nation	Player

=== FC Lokomotíva Košice ===
In: Note: Flags indicate national team as defined under FIFA eligibility rules; some limited exceptions apply. Players may hold more than one non-FIFA nationality.

No.	Pos.	Nation	Player
—	FW	SVK	Adam Sovič (loan return from TJ FK Vyšné Opátske)

Out: Note: Flags indicate national team as defined under FIFA eligibility rules; some limited exceptions apply. Players may hold more than one non-FIFA nationality.

No.	Pos.	Nation	Player
—	MF	SVK	Blažej Vaščák (to MFK Skalica)
—	FW	SVK	Ľubomír Slinčák (to OŠK Pavlovce nad Uhom)

=== FC Nitra ===
In: Note: Flags indicate national team as defined under FIFA eligibility rules; some limited exceptions apply. Players may hold more than one non-FIFA nationality.

No.	Pos.	Nation	Player
—	GK	SVK	Lukáš Hroššo (from (Czech Republic) FK Dukla Prague)
—	MF	SVK	Christián Steinhübel (from ŠKF Sereď)
—	DF	CMR	Macdonald Ngwa Niba (from (Canada) North Toronto Soccer Club)
—	MF	SVK	Peter Lupčo (on loan from MŠK Žilina)
—	MF	SVK	Patrik Kemláge (from ŠK Svätý Jur)
—	MF	SVK	Patrik Abrahám (from Spartak Myjava)
—	FW	KEN	John Mark Makwatta (from (Kenya) Ulinzi Stars F.C.)

Out: Note: Flags indicate national team as defined under FIFA eligibility rules; some limited exceptions apply. Players may hold more than one non-FIFA nationality.

No.	Pos.	Nation	Player
—	MF	CZE	Jan Shejbal (loan return to (Czech Republic) FC Hradec Králové)
—	GK	SVK	Richard Stránsky (on loan to FC Slovan Galanta)
—	DF	SVK	Juraj Križko (Released and joined TJ Iskra Borčice)
—	MF	SVK	Marcel Oravec (to (Austria) FCM Traiskirchen)

=== MŠK Žilina B ===
In: Note: Flags indicate national team as defined under FIFA eligibility rules; some limited exceptions apply. Players may hold more than one non-FIFA nationality.

No.	Pos.	Nation	Player
—	GK	SVK	Dominik Holec (loan return from FK Pohronie)

Out: Note: Flags indicate national team as defined under FIFA eligibility rules; some limited exceptions apply. Players may hold more than one non-FIFA nationality.

No.	Pos.	Nation	Player
—	GK	SVK	Dominik Holec (on loan to FC ViOn Zlaté Moravce)

=== FK Pohronie ===
In: Note: Flags indicate national team as defined under FIFA eligibility rules; some limited exceptions apply. Players may hold more than one non-FIFA nationality.

No.	Pos.	Nation	Player
—	FW	SVK	Peter Ďungel (on loan from MŠK Žilina B)

Out: Note: Flags indicate national team as defined under FIFA eligibility rules; some limited exceptions apply. Players may hold more than one non-FIFA nationality.

No.	Pos.	Nation	Player
—	GK	SVK	Tomáš Lešňovský (to MŠK Námestovo)
—	FW	SRB	Samir Nurković (to FC ViOn Zlaté Moravce)
—	FW	SVK	Boris Turčák (on loan to FC Petržalka akadémia)
—	MF	SVK	Dominik Rolinec (loan return to AS Trenčín)
—	DF	SVK	Lukáš Hrnčiar (to TJ Sklotatran Poltár)

=== ŠK Slovan Bratislava juniori ===
In: Note: Flags indicate national team as defined under FIFA eligibility rules; some limited exceptions apply. Players may hold more than one non-FIFA nationality.

No.	Pos.	Nation	Player
—	MF	SVK	Ján Bajza (from MFK Lokomotíva Zvolen)
—	GK	SVK	Juraj Fukatsch (from NMŠK 1922 Bratislava)
—	DF	SVK	Richard Hrebačka (from FK Rača)
—	MF	SVK	Lukáš Piatra (from FC Ružinov Bratislava)
—	FW	SVK	Daniel Petráš (from FK Inter Bratislava)

Out: Note: Flags indicate national team as defined under FIFA eligibility rules; some limited exceptions apply. Players may hold more than one non-FIFA nationality.

No.	Pos.	Nation	Player
—	MF	SVK	Dominik Malý (on loan to ŠK 1923 Gabčíkovo)
—	MF	SVK	Marek Sabo (on loan to ŠK Svätý Jur)
—	FW	SVK	Simon Tichý (to (Austria) SV Wimpassing)
—	FW	GUI	Seybou Sidibe (Released)

=== MŠK Fomat Martin ===
In: Note: Flags indicate national team as defined under FIFA eligibility rules; some limited exceptions apply. Players may hold more than one non-FIFA nationality.

No.	Pos.	Nation	Player

Out: Note: Flags indicate national team as defined under FIFA eligibility rules; some limited exceptions apply. Players may hold more than one non-FIFA nationality.

No.	Pos.	Nation	Player
—	FW	SVK	Peter Ďungel (loan return to MŠK Žilina B)
—	FW	SVK	Radoslav Ďanovský (on loan to FK Dukla Banská Bystrica)
—	DF	SVK	Lukáš Ondrek (loan return to MFK Ružomberok)
—	MF	SVK	Ľuboš Thomka (to (Austria) UFC Texingtal)
—	MF	SVK	Peter Koleno (to ŠK Dynamo Diviaky)

=== FK Dukla Banská Bystrica ===
In: Note: Flags indicate national team as defined under FIFA eligibility rules; some limited exceptions apply. Players may hold more than one non-FIFA nationality.

No.	Pos.	Nation	Player
—	MF	SVK	Jozef Rejdovian (from FC ViOn Zlaté Moravce)
—	FW	SVK	Radoslav Ďanovský (from MŠK Fomat Martin)
—	MF	SVK	Peter Szczepaniak (on loan from FO ŽP Šport Podbrezová)
—	FW	SVK	Matej Starší (from MFK Nová Baňa)
—	FW	SVK	Fabián Slančík (from (Austria) Kremser SC)
—	FW	SVK	Šimon Šmehýl (from Spartak Myjava)
—	GK	SRB	Bojan Brać (from (Romania) CS Universitatea Craiova)

Out: Note: Flags indicate national team as defined under FIFA eligibility rules; some limited exceptions apply. Players may hold more than one non-FIFA nationality.

No.	Pos.	Nation	Player
—	MF	SVK	Denis Urgela (to ŠK Kremnička)
—	MF	SVK	Tomáš Zázrivec (to TJ Sokol Medzibrod)
—	FW	CRO	Ivan Jakov Džoni (to (Singapore) Tampines Rovers FC)
—	DF	SVK	Marián Jarabica (to (Poland) KS ROW 1964 Rybnik)
—	MF	BIH	Faris Handžić (to (Bosnia and Herzegovina) FK Velež Mostar)
—	DF	CRO	Marko Barišić (to (Croatia) NK Hrvatski Dragovoljac)
—	DF	NED	Haris Memić (to MFK Lokomotíva Zvolen)
—	DF	SVK	Tomáš Bagi (Released)
—	DF	SVK	Juraj Chupač (Released)
—	FW	CZE	Josef Čtvrtníček (loan return to (Czech Republic) FC Zbrojovka Brno)
—	MF	CRO	Muhamed Nuredini (on loan to FK Slovan Duslo Šaľa)

=== ŠK Svätý Jur ===
In: Note: Flags indicate national team as defined under FIFA eligibility rules; some limited exceptions apply. Players may hold more than one non-FIFA nationality.

No.	Pos.	Nation	Player
—	GK	SVK	Martin Brza (on loan from MFK Snina)
—	FW	SVK	Mário Breška (from (Greece) Panthiraikos F.C.)
—	DF	SVK	Roman Mihálik (from (Austria) USC Wallern)
—	MF	SVK	Marek Sabo (on loan from Slovan Bratislava juniori)
—	DF	POL	Tomasz Wandzik (from (Poland) Gwarek Ornontowice)
—	FW	POR	Hélder Rodrigues (from (Poland) MLKS Woźniki)
—	MF	SRB	Obrad Popara (from FK Slovan Duslo Šaľa)

Out: Note: Flags indicate national team as defined under FIFA eligibility rules; some limited exceptions apply. Players may hold more than one non-FIFA nationality.

No.	Pos.	Nation	Player
—	MF	SVK	Patrik Kemláge (to FC Nitra)
—	FW	SVK	David Kočiš-Kovaľ (to (Austria) SV Union Raika Blindenmarkt)
—	FW	SVK	Šimon Valachovič (to (Austria) SC Frauenkirchen)
—	MF	SVK	Michal Šufliarský (to (Austria) SC Ritzing)
—	GK	SVK	Patrik Hipp (Released)
—	DF	SVK	Roman Bauer (to MŠK Iskra Petržalka)
—	FW	SVK	Henrich Benčík (to ČFK Nitra)

=== MFK Tatran Liptovský Mikuláš ===
In: Note: Flags indicate national team as defined under FIFA eligibility rules; some limited exceptions apply. Players may hold more than one non-FIFA nationality.

No.	Pos.	Nation	Player
—	FW	SVK	Oliver Špilár (from (Czech Republic) SK Benátky nad Jizerou)
—	DF	SVK	Juraj Jánošík (from (Czech Republic) AS Trenčín)
—	DF	SVK	Ivan Očenáš (on loan from FO ŽP Šport Podbrezová)

Out: Note: Flags indicate national team as defined under FIFA eligibility rules; some limited exceptions apply. Players may hold more than one non-FIFA nationality.

No.	Pos.	Nation	Player
—	FW	SVK	Štefan Gerec (loan return to MFK Ružomberok)
—	DF	SVK	Martin Kubena (to TJ Jednota Bánová)

=== FK Spišská Nová Ves ===
In: Note: Flags indicate national team as defined under FIFA eligibility rules; some limited exceptions apply. Players may hold more than one non-FIFA nationality.

No.	Pos.	Nation	Player
—	DF	UKR	Roman Botvynnyk (from (Ukraine) FC Sambir)
—	GK	SVK	Róbert Huszárik (from FK Poprad)

Out: Note: Flags indicate national team as defined under FIFA eligibility rules; some limited exceptions apply. Players may hold more than one non-FIFA nationality.

No.	Pos.	Nation	Player
—	MF	SVK	Dárius Vandraško (loan return to MŠK Spišské Podhradie)
—	MF	SVK	Šimon Dunajčan (to TJ Slovan Smižany)
—	GK	SVK	Roland Stančák (to TJ Slovan Smižany)

=== MFK Lokomotíva Zvolen ===
In: Note: Flags indicate national team as defined under FIFA eligibility rules; some limited exceptions apply. Players may hold more than one non-FIFA nationality.

No.	Pos.	Nation	Player
—	DF	NED	Haris Memić (from FK Dukla Banská Bystrica)
—	MF	SVK	Jozef Sombat (on loan from ŠK Veľké Zálužie)
—	DF	SRB	Stefan Jovanović (from (Bosnia and Herzegovina) NK Bratstvo Gračanica)
—	FW	FRA	Emmanuel-Kenneth Traore (on loan from Spartak Trnava juniori)

Out: Note: Flags indicate national team as defined under FIFA eligibility rules; some limited exceptions apply. Players may hold more than one non-FIFA nationality.

No.	Pos.	Nation	Player
—	DF	SVK	Mário Tóth (loan return to FC DAC 1904 Dunajská Streda and joined (Malta) FC Mosta)
—	MF	SVK	Ján Bajza (to Slovan Bratislava juniori)
—	MF	SVK	Andrej Kamendy (to ŠK Novohrad Lučenec)
—	FW	CGO	Elvis Mashike Sukisa (to (Czech Republic) Loko Vltavín)

=== FK Poprad ===
In: Note: Flags indicate national team as defined under FIFA eligibility rules; some limited exceptions apply. Players may hold more than one non-FIFA nationality.

No.	Pos.	Nation	Player
—	FW	SVK	Stanislav Šesták (from Free Agent)
—	DF	CZE	Jakub Hric (from (Czech Republic) SK Dynamo České Budějovice)
—	FW	CZE	Jakub Šašinka (on loan from (Czech Republic) FC Baník Ostrava)
—	FW	SVK	Jozef Kapláň (from (Singapore) Geylang International FC)
—	MF	CRO	Duje Medak (from (Croatia) NK Neretvanac Opuzen)
—	MF	SVK	Vladimír Kukoľ (from Spartak Myjava)
—	MF	SVK	Lukáš Tóth (on loan from MFK Vranov nad Topľou)

Out: Note: Flags indicate national team as defined under FIFA eligibility rules; some limited exceptions apply. Players may hold more than one non-FIFA nationality.

No.	Pos.	Nation	Player
—	FW	CYP	Alekos Alekou (Released)
—	FW	CRO	Pëllumb Jusufi (Released)
—	DF	SVK	Ľubomír Jurčo (Released)
—	MF	SVK	Mário Kurák (Released)
—	MF	SVK	Peter Lupčo (loan return to MŠK Žilina II)
—	FW	SVK	Róbert Ujčík (Released)
—	GK	SVK	Róbert Huszárik (to FK Spišská Nová Ves)

=== FK Haniska ===
In: Note: Flags indicate national team as defined under FIFA eligibility rules; some limited exceptions apply. Players may hold more than one non-FIFA nationality.

No.	Pos.	Nation	Player
—	FW	MKD	Artan Veliu (from (North Macedonia) FK Vardari Forino)
—	GK	SLO	Marko Deronja (on loan from FC VSS Košice)

Out: Note: Flags indicate national team as defined under FIFA eligibility rules; some limited exceptions apply. Players may hold more than one non-FIFA nationality.

No.	Pos.	Nation	Player
—	DF	SVK	Miroslav Klimek (to FK Čaňa)
—	FW	BRA	Rômulo (to Partizán Bardejov)

=== ŠK Odeva Lipany ===
In: Note: Flags indicate national team as defined under FIFA eligibility rules; some limited exceptions apply. Players may hold more than one non-FIFA nationality.

No.	Pos.	Nation	Player
—	DF	SVK	Jozef Bujňák (on loan from 1. FC Tatran Prešov)
—	MF	SVK	Slavomír Královič (on loan from 1. FC Tatran Prešov)
—	DF	SVK	Richard Štefčák (from TBD)

Out: Note: Flags indicate national team as defined under FIFA eligibility rules; some limited exceptions apply. Players may hold more than one non-FIFA nationality.

No.	Pos.	Nation	Player
—	MF	SVK	Ivan Pončák (to OŠFK Šarišské Michaľany)
—	DF	SVK	Ján Janič (to OŠFK Šarišské Michaľany)
—	FW	SVK	Lukáš Eliaš (to MFK Vranov nad Topľou)
—	DF	SVK	Jakub Rokošný (on loan to MFK Slovan Sabinov)

=== MŠK Rimavská Sobota ===
In: Note: Flags indicate national team as defined under FIFA eligibility rules; some limited exceptions apply. Players may hold more than one non-FIFA nationality.

No.	Pos.	Nation	Player
—	FW	SVK	Andreas Wurczell (on loan from FC DAC 1904 Dunajská Streda)
—	MF	SVK	Norbert Uličný (on loan from TJ - FK Veľký Blh)
—	MF	SVK	Tomáš Fajčík (on loan from FK Dukla Banská Bystrica)
—	MF	SVK	Erik Ľupták (on loan from TJ Baník Kalinovo)
—	FW	UKR	Vladyslav Mazur (on loan from FK Slovan Ivanka pri Dunaji)
—	MF	SVK	Gergö Kelemen (from ŠK Novohrad Lučenec)
—	DF	SRB	Miloš Sekulić (from (Serbia) FK Donji Srem)

Out: Note: Flags indicate national team as defined under FIFA eligibility rules; some limited exceptions apply. Players may hold more than one non-FIFA nationality.

No.	Pos.	Nation	Player
—	FW	SVK	Tomáš Trabalík (loan return to MFK Lokomotíva Zvolen)
—	DF	UKR	Artem Gnyp (Released)
—	MF	JPN	Shotaro Hattori (Released)
—	MF	SVK	Jozef Gazda (to FK Mesta Tornaľa)
—	DF	FRA	Abou Diamougue (Released)
—	FW	SVK	Martin Janco (loan return to MŠK Považská Bystrica)
—	FW	SVK	Patrik Husaník (to ŠK Novohrad Lučenec)
—	GK	SVK	Jozef Olejník (loan return to FC DAC 1904 Dunajská Streda)
—	MF	SVK	Marko Püšpöky (on loan to ŠK Novohrad Lučenec)
—	DF	SVK	Jozef Petrusz (loan return to FO ŽP Šport Podbrezová)
—	MF	SRB	Nemanja Spasojević (to (Czech Republic) MFK Frýdek-Místek)
