= List of Slovak football transfers summer 2017 =

Notable Slovak football transfers in the summer transfer window 2017 by club. Only transfers of the Fortuna Liga and DOXXbet liga are included.

== Fortuna Liga ==
=== MŠK Žilina ===
In: Note: Flags indicate national team as defined under FIFA eligibility rules; some limited exceptions apply. Players may hold more than one non-FIFA nationality.

No.	Pos.	Nation	Player
—	FW	SVK	Lukáš Čmelík (loan return from (Poland) Piast Gliwice)
—	FW	SVK	Róbert Polievka (from FC DAC 1904 Dunajská Streda)
—	GK	SVK	Dominik Holec (loan return from FC ViOn Zlaté Moravce)
—	DF	SVK	Juraj Chvátal (on loan from (Czech Republic) AC Sparta Prague)
—	MF	ARM	Vahan Bichakhchyan (from (Armenia) FC Shirak)
—	FW	SVK	Miloš Lačný (from Free agent)

Out: Note: Flags indicate national team as defined under FIFA eligibility rules; some limited exceptions apply. Players may hold more than one non-FIFA nationality.

No.	Pos.	Nation	Player
—	DF	BIH	Bojan Letić (Released and joined (Czech Republic) MFK Karviná)
—	FW	SVK	Lukáš Čmelík (to FC DAC 1904 Dunajská Streda)
13	FW	SVK	Filip Hlohovský (to (South Korea) Seongnam FC)
—	DF	CMR	Ernest Mabouka (to (Israel) Maccabi Haifa F.C.)
—	DF	SVK	Denis Vavro (to (Denmark) F.C. Copenhagen)
—	FW	AZE	Ramil Sheydayev (loan return to (Turkey) Trabzonspor)

=== ŠK Slovan Bratislava ===
In: Note: Flags indicate national team as defined under FIFA eligibility rules; some limited exceptions apply. Players may hold more than one non-FIFA nationality.

No.	Pos.	Nation	Player
—	MF	CZE	Jakub Mareš (from MFK Ružomberok)
—	DF	SVK	Juraj Kotula (loan return from FK Senica)
—	FW	SVK	Filip Hološko (from (Australia) Sydney FC)
—	MF	NGA	Rabiu Ibrahim (from (Belgium) K.A.A. Gent)
—	MF	CZE	Lukáš Droppa (from Free agent)
—	DF	BUL	Vasil Bozhikov (from Free agent)
—	DF	GRE	Diamantis Chouchoumis (from (Greece) Panathinaikos F.C.)
27	MF	HUN	Dávid Holman (from (Hungary) Debreceni VSC)
—	DF	SVK	Erik Čikoš (from FK Senica)

Out: Note: Flags indicate national team as defined under FIFA eligibility rules; some limited exceptions apply. Players may hold more than one non-FIFA nationality.

No.	Pos.	Nation	Player
—	FW	HUN	Tamás Priskin (to (Hungary) Ferencváros)
—	DF	NED	Lorenzo Burnet (Released and joined (Netherlands) S.B.V. Excelsior)
—	FW	BRA	Cléber (Released and joined FC ViOn Zlaté Moravce)
—	DF	ARG	Vernon (on loan to (Poland) Lech Poznań)
—	GK	SVK	Ján Mucha (Released and joined (Poland) Nieciecza)
—	MF	SVK	Tomáš Kóňa (Released and joined FC Nitra)
—	GK	SVK	Martin Krnáč (Released and joined (Hungary) Mezőkövesdi SE)
—	MF	GUI	Seydouba Soumah (to (Serbia) Partizan)
—	MF	SVK	Marek Rigo (on loan to FK Senica)
—	FW	SVK	Filip Ďuriš (on loan to FK Senica)
—	DF	NED	Ruben Ligeon (Released)
—	MF	NED	Lesly de Sa (on loan to (Netherlands) FC Oss)

=== MFK Ružomberok ===
In: Note: Flags indicate national team as defined under FIFA eligibility rules; some limited exceptions apply. Players may hold more than one non-FIFA nationality.

No.	Pos.	Nation	Player
—	MF	SVK	Matej Kochan (from FO ŽP Šport Podbrezová)
—	FW	SVK	Dominik Kunca (from Zemplín Michalovce)
—	FW	BIH	Nermin Haskić (from (Poland) Podbeskidzie Bielsko-Biała)
—	MF	ALB	Kristi Qose (from (Greece) PAOK FC)
—	MF	MKD	Tihomir Kostadinov (from FC ViOn Zlaté Moravce)
—	DF	SVK	Michal Jonec (from FC VSS Košice)
—	DF	EST	Artur Pikk (from Free agent)

Out: Note: Flags indicate national team as defined under FIFA eligibility rules; some limited exceptions apply. Players may hold more than one non-FIFA nationality.

No.	Pos.	Nation	Player
—	MF	CZE	Jakub Mareš (to ŠK Slovan Bratislava)
—	MF	SVK	Martin Nagy (to (Hungary) Győri ETO FC)
34	GK	SVK	Ľuboš Hajdúch (End of career)
—	FW	SVK	Andrej Lovás (to FC Spartak Trnava)
6	MF	SVK	Michal Faško (to (Switzerland) Grasshoppers)
—	MF	SVK	Tomáš Gerát (to FK Železiarne Podbrezová)
—	MF	SVK	Tomáš Ďubek (to (Hungary) Zalaegerszegi TE)
31	FW	SVK	Miloš Lačný (Released and joined MŠK Žilina)

=== FK AS Trenčín ===
In: Note: Flags indicate national team as defined under FIFA eligibility rules; some limited exceptions apply. Players may hold more than one non-FIFA nationality.

No.	Pos.	Nation	Player
—	FW	BIH	Hamza Čataković (from (Bosnia and Herzegovina) FK Sarajevo)
—	FW	NED	Aschraf El Mahdioui (from (Netherlands) ADO Den Haag)
—	MF	NED	Ricky van Haaren (from Free agent)
—	DF	SVK	Peter Čögley (from Free agent)
—	FW	NGA	Philip Azango (from (Nigeria) GBS Academy)
—	MF	NGA	Ejike Okoh (from (Nigeria) GBS Academy)

Out: Note: Flags indicate national team as defined under FIFA eligibility rules; some limited exceptions apply. Players may hold more than one non-FIFA nationality.

No.	Pos.	Nation	Player
—	FW	NGA	Uche Nwofor (Released)
—	FW	NED	Milton Klooster (on loan to FK Inter Bratislava)
—	FW	SVK	Erik Prekop (on loan to FK Inter Bratislava)
—	DF	NGA	Christopher Udeh (on loan to 1. FC Tatran Prešov)
—	FW	NGA	Issa Adekunle (on loan to 1. FC Tatran Prešov)
—	MF	BRA	Pedro Colina (Released)
—	GK	SVK	Matej Vozár (Released)
—	MF	SVK	Denis Jančo (on loan to FK Poprad)

=== FK Železiarne Podbrezová ===
In: Note: Flags indicate national team as defined under FIFA eligibility rules; some limited exceptions apply. Players may hold more than one non-FIFA nationality.

No.	Pos.	Nation	Player
—	MF	SVK	Dávid Leško (from 1. FC Tatran Prešov)
—	MF	SVK	Adrián Kopičár (from FK Senica)
—	MF	SVK	Martin Válovčan (from FC ViOn Zlaté Moravce)
—	MF	SVK	Tomáš Gerát (from MFK Ružomberok)
—	MF	ARG	Aldo Baéz (from Free agent)

Out: Note: Flags indicate national team as defined under FIFA eligibility rules; some limited exceptions apply. Players may hold more than one non-FIFA nationality.

No.	Pos.	Nation	Player
—	MF	SVK	Matej Kochan (to MFK Ružomberok)
—	DF	SVK	Patrik Vajda (to (Hungary) Győri ETO FC)
—	MF	ARG	Pablo Podio (to (Czech Republic) FC Fastav Zlín)
—	FW	SVK	Róbert Polievka (loan return to FC DAC 1904 Dunajská Streda)

=== FC Spartak Trnava ===
In: Note: Flags indicate national team as defined under FIFA eligibility rules; some limited exceptions apply. Players may hold more than one non-FIFA nationality.

No.	Pos.	Nation	Player
—	FW	SVK	Andrej Lovás (from MFK Ružomberok)
—	MF	GEO	Vakhtang Chanturishvili (from (Ukraine) FC Oleksandriya)
—	MF	AUT	Yasin Pehlivan (free agent)
—	FW	AUT	Marvin Egho (from (Austria) SV Ried)
—	DF	SRB	Slavko Lukić (free agent)
—	MF	SVK	Štefan Pekár (from (Czech Republic) FC Baník Ostrava)
—	MF	SVK	Tomáš Brigant (from (Czech Republic) FC Zbrojovka Brno)
—	GK	SVK	Martin Chudý (from (Czech Republic) FK Teplice)
—	MF	SVK	Ján Vlasko (free agent)

Out: Note: Flags indicate national team as defined under FIFA eligibility rules; some limited exceptions apply. Players may hold more than one non-FIFA nationality.

No.	Pos.	Nation	Player
—	GK	SVK	Matej Strapák (End of contract)
—	DF	SVK	Peter Čögley (End of contract - joined AS Trenčín)
—	MF	BRA	Kerlon (Released)
—	MF	BIH	Emir Halilović (End of contract - joined (Austria) FC Blau-Weiß Linz)
—	MF	SVK	Martin Košťál (End of contract - joined (Poland) Wisła Kraków)
—	FW	SVK	Ivan Schranz (End of contract - joined (Czech Republic) Dukla Prague)
—	FW	SVK	Daniel Dubec (End of contract - joined Poprad)
—	GK	SVK	Adam Jakubech (to (France) Lille OSC)
—	FW	CMR	Robert Tambe (to (Turkey) Adana Demirspor)

=== FC DAC 1904 Dunajská Streda ===
In: Note: Flags indicate national team as defined under FIFA eligibility rules; some limited exceptions apply. Players may hold more than one non-FIFA nationality.

No.	Pos.	Nation	Player
—	FW	SVK	Róbert Polievka (loan return from FK Železiarne Podbrezová)
—	GK	CZE	Patrik Macej (from MFK Zemplín Michalovce)
—	DF	SVK	Kristián Koštrna (from (Bulgaria) OFC Pirin Blagoevgrad)
—	FW	SVK	Lukáš Čmelík (from MŠK Žilina)
13	FW	HUN	Zsolt Kalmár (on loan from (Germany) RB Leipzig)
—	FW	SVK	Tomáš Malec (on loan from (Austria) LASK Linz)
—	MF	GHA	Reuben Acquah (from (Albania) FK Tirana)

Out: Note: Flags indicate national team as defined under FIFA eligibility rules; some limited exceptions apply. Players may hold more than one non-FIFA nationality.

No.	Pos.	Nation	Player
—	DF	SVK	Ľubomír Michalík (End of contract)
—	GK	MKD	Darko Tofiloski (End of contract)
—	DF	SVK	Zsolt Németh (End of contract - joined (Hungary) Gyirmót SE)
—	MF	SVK	Jakub Brašeň (End of contract - joined (Hungary) Mezőkövesdi SE)
—	MF	SEN	Pape Macou Sarr (End of contract)
—	MF	SVK	Peter Štepanovský (End of contract and joined (Czech Republic) MFK Karviná)
—	FW	SVK	Róbert Polievka (to MŠK Žilina)
—	FW	SVK	Pavol Šafranko (to (Denmark) AaB Fodbold)

=== MFK Zemplín Michalovce ===
In: Note: Flags indicate national team as defined under FIFA eligibility rules; some limited exceptions apply. Players may hold more than one non-FIFA nationality.

No.	Pos.	Nation	Player
—	MF	SVK	Miroslav Božok (from (Poland) Arka Gdynia)
—	DF	ESP	José Carrillo (from (Spain) UD Logroñés)
—	DF	BLR	Aleksandr Sverchinskiy (from (Belarus) FC Isloch Minsk Raion)
—	GK	POL	Gerard Bieszczad (from (Poland) Bytovia Bytów)
—	DF	SVK	Ladislav Šosták (from Partizán Bardejov)
—	FW	CRO	Tin Matić (on loan from (Poland) Legia Warsaw)
—	FW	GHA	Sadam Sulley (on loan from (Poland) Legia Warsaw)

Out: Note: Flags indicate national team as defined under FIFA eligibility rules; some limited exceptions apply. Players may hold more than one non-FIFA nationality.

No.	Pos.	Nation	Player
—	FW	SVK	Dominik Kunca (to MFK Ružomberok)
—	GK	CZE	Patrik Macej (to FC DAC 1904 Dunajská Streda)
—	MF	SVK	Tomáš Sedlák (Released)
—	MF	ALB	Kristi Qose (loan return to (Greece) PAOK FC)
—	DF	SVK	Michal Sipľak (to (Poland) KS Cracovia)
—	FW	SVK	Filip Serečin (on loan to FC Lokomotíva Košice)

=== FK Senica ===
In: Note: Flags indicate national team as defined under FIFA eligibility rules; some limited exceptions apply. Players may hold more than one non-FIFA nationality.

No.	Pos.	Nation	Player
—	GK	SVK	Vojtech Milošovič (from FC DAC 1904 Dunajská Streda)
—	MF	SVK	Dávid Richtárech (from AS Trenčín)
—	DF	SVK	Oliver Podhorín (from MFK Zemplín Michalovce)
—	DF	CZE	Juri Medvedev (from Free agent)
—	FW	BRA	Rômulo Silva Santos (on loan from Partizán Bardejov)
—	MF	SVK	Marek Rigo (on loan from ŠK Slovan Bratislava)
—	FW	SVK	Filip Ďuriš (on loan from ŠK Slovan Bratislava)
—	DF	SVK	Marián Jarabica (from Free agent)
—	MF	NGA	Pentecos (on loan from FK Inter Bratislava)
—	MF	SVK	Blažej Vaščák (from FK Železiarne Podbrezová)
—	MF	SVK	Denis Duga (from Free agent)
—	DF	SVK	Erik Čikoš (from Free agent)

Out: Note: Flags indicate national team as defined under FIFA eligibility rules; some limited exceptions apply. Players may hold more than one non-FIFA nationality.

No.	Pos.	Nation	Player
—	DF	SVK	Róbert Pillár (to (Hungary) Mezőkövesdi SE)
—	MF	SVK	Adrián Kopičár (to FK Železiarne Podbrezová)
—	MF	SVK	Filip Blažek (to (Denmark) Brøndby IF)
—	FW	SVK	Tomáš Brigant (loan return to (Czech Republic) FC Zbrojovka Brno)
—	DF	SVK	Erik Čikoš (to ŠK Slovan Bratislava)

=== FC ViOn Zlaté Moravce ===
In: Note: Flags indicate national team as defined under FIFA eligibility rules; some limited exceptions apply. Players may hold more than one non-FIFA nationality.

No.	Pos.	Nation	Player
—	FW	BRA	Cléber (from ŠK Slovan Bratislava)
—	DF	SVK	Martin Dobrotka (from (Czech Republic) FK Baník Sokolov)
—	DF	SRB	Miloš Nikolić (from Free agent)
—	DF	SVK	Timotej Záhumenský (from MFK Skalica)
—	FW	SVK	Peter Sládek (on loan from (Poland) Podbeskidzie Bielsko-Biała)
—	MF	BRA	Baggio (on loan from (Brazil) São Bernardo Futebol Clube)
—	MF	BRA	Renan (on loan from (Brazil) São Bernardo Futebol Clube)

Out: Note: Flags indicate national team as defined under FIFA eligibility rules; some limited exceptions apply. Players may hold more than one non-FIFA nationality.

No.	Pos.	Nation	Player
—	DF	SVK	Martin Boszorád (to (Hungary) Győri ETO FC)
—	MF	SVK	Martin Válovčan (to FK Železiarne Podbrezová)
—	MF	MKD	Tihomir Kostadinov (to MFK Ružomberok)
—	MF	GUI	Pépé Guilavogui (Released)
—	GK	SVK	Dominik Holec (loan return to MŠK Žilina)
—	MF	SVK	Miroslav Pastva (to (Poland) MKP Pogoń Siedlce)

=== 1. FC Tatran Prešov ===
In: Note: Flags indicate national team as defined under FIFA eligibility rules; some limited exceptions apply. Players may hold more than one non-FIFA nationality.

No.	Pos.	Nation	Player
—	FW	NGA	Hector Tubonemi (loan return from FK Slavoj Trebišov)
—	FW	SVK	Roland Černák (on loan from FC DAC 1904 Dunajská Streda)
—	FW	POL	Jakub Więzik (from (Germany) ZFC Meuselwitz)
—	DF	NGA	Christopher Udeh (on loan from AS Trenčín)
—	FW	NGA	Issa Adekunle (on loan from AS Trenčín)
—	MF	SVK	András Lénárt (on loan from (Hungary) Videoton II)
—	DF	UKR	Oleksii Miliutin (from ŠK Odeva Lipany)

Out: Note: Flags indicate national team as defined under FIFA eligibility rules; some limited exceptions apply. Players may hold more than one non-FIFA nationality.

No.	Pos.	Nation	Player
—	FW	SVK	Lukáš Kubus (to FK Spišská Nová Ves)
—	FW	CZE	Jakub Rolinc (Released)
—	FW	NGA	Hector Tubonemi (Released)
—	MF	SVK	Dávid Leško (to FK Železiarne Podbrezová)

=== FC Nitra ===
In: Note: Flags indicate national team as defined under FIFA eligibility rules; some limited exceptions apply. Players may hold more than one non-FIFA nationality.

No.	Pos.	Nation	Player
—	MF	SVK	Tomáš Kóňa (from ŠK Slovan Bratislava)

Out: Note: Flags indicate national team as defined under FIFA eligibility rules; some limited exceptions apply. Players may hold more than one non-FIFA nationality.

No.	Pos.	Nation	Player

== 2. liga ==
=== FC VSS Košice ===
In: Note: Flags indicate national team as defined under FIFA eligibility rules; some limited exceptions apply. Players may hold more than one non-FIFA nationality.

No.	Pos.	Nation	Player

Out: Note: Flags indicate national team as defined under FIFA eligibility rules; some limited exceptions apply. Players may hold more than one non-FIFA nationality.

No.	Pos.	Nation	Player
—	GK	CZE	Jakub Kotěra (to (Czech Republic) FK Ústí nad Labem)
—	MF	SRB	Nikola Ristovski (to FC Lokomotíva Košice)
—	DF	SVK	Mikuláš Tóth (to FC Lokomotíva Košice)
—	MF	FRA	Mahamadou Dramé (to TBA)
—	DF	FRA	Jean-Pierre Morgan (to TBA)
—	GK	SVK	Matúš Ružinský (to TBA)
—	DF	SVK	František Vancák (to FC Lokomotíva Košice)
—	DF	SVK	Jaroslav Kolbas (to FK Slavoj Trebišov)
—	DF	CRO	Karlo Bilić (to FK Železiarne Podbrezová)
—	MF	SVK	Peter Šinglár (to ŠK Záhradné)
—	MF	SVK	Patrik Grega (to 1. MFK Kežmarok)
—	FW	SVK	Tomáš Kubík (to FK Spišská Nová Ves)
—	DF	SVK	Zoltán Žebík (End of professional career)
—	GK	SVK	Marián Kello (End of professional career)
—	FW	SRB	Nikola Đorđević (TBA)
—	DF	SVK	Michal Jonec (to MFK Ružomberok)
—	MF	RUS	Sergei Ivanov (loan return to (Russia) FC Zenit-2 Saint Petersburg)
—	MF	RUS	Nikita Andreyev (loan return to (Russia) FC Zenit-2 Saint Petersburg)

=== MFK Skalica ===
In: Note: Flags indicate national team as defined under FIFA eligibility rules; some limited exceptions apply. Players may hold more than one non-FIFA nationality.

No.	Pos.	Nation	Player
—	MF	SVK	Lukáš Opiela (from Free agent)
—	FW	CZE	Roman Haša (from KFC Komárno)
—	MF	CZE	Ondřej Čtvrtníček (from KFC Komárno)

Out: Note: Flags indicate national team as defined under FIFA eligibility rules; some limited exceptions apply. Players may hold more than one non-FIFA nationality.

No.	Pos.	Nation	Player
—	DF	SVK	Ladislav Szőcs (to (Hungary) Gyirmót SE)
—	DF	SVK	Radoslav Ciprys (Released)
—	FW	SRB	Marko Milunović (Released and joined ŠKF Sereď)
—	MF	SVK	Blažej Vaščák (Released)
—	MF	SVK	Ádam Meszáros (Released)
—	MF	CZE	Jakub Slaný (Released)
—	DF	SVK	Martin Vrablec (Released)
—	MF	SRB	Filip Panakarićan (Released)
—	MF	SVK	Radoslav Človečko (Released and joined FC Lokomotíva Košice)

=== FC ŠTK 1914 Šamorín ===
In: Note: Flags indicate national team as defined under FIFA eligibility rules; some limited exceptions apply. Players may hold more than one non-FIFA nationality.

No.	Pos.	Nation	Player

Out: Note: Flags indicate national team as defined under FIFA eligibility rules; some limited exceptions apply. Players may hold more than one non-FIFA nationality.

No.	Pos.	Nation	Player

=== Partizán Bardejov ===
In: Note: Flags indicate national team as defined under FIFA eligibility rules; some limited exceptions apply. Players may hold more than one non-FIFA nationality.

No.	Pos.	Nation	Player

Out: Note: Flags indicate national team as defined under FIFA eligibility rules; some limited exceptions apply. Players may hold more than one non-FIFA nationality.

No.	Pos.	Nation	Player
—	DF	SVK	Ladislav Šosták (to MFK Zemplín Michalovce)
—	FW	BRA	Rômulo Silva Santos (on loan to FK Senica)

=== FC Lokomotíva Košice ===
In: Note: Flags indicate national team as defined under FIFA eligibility rules; some limited exceptions apply. Players may hold more than one non-FIFA nationality.

No.	Pos.	Nation	Player
—	DF	SVK	Mikuláš Tóth (from FC VSS Košice)
—	MF	SVK	Radoslav Človečko (from MFK Skalica)
—	MF	SVK	Tomáš Ilinjo (from MFK Zemplín Michalovce)
—	MF	SVK	Jakub Straka (from 1. FC Tatran Prešov)
—	DF	SVK	Adam Kuľha (from MFK Zemplín Michalovce)
—	MF	SRB	Nikola Ristovski (from FC VSS Košice)
—	FW	CMR	Joel Tata (from (Kenya) Thika United F.C.)
—	FW	SVK	Michal Beli (from FC Lokomotíva Košice U19)
—	MF	SVK	František Vancák (from FC VSS Košice)
—	FW	SVK	Filip Serečin (on loan from MFK Zemplín Michalovce)

Out: Note: Flags indicate national team as defined under FIFA eligibility rules; some limited exceptions apply. Players may hold more than one non-FIFA nationality.

No.	Pos.	Nation	Player
—	FW	SVK	Róbert Jano (to (Hungary) Gyirmót SE)
—	GK	SVK	Jakub Kovalik (to TBA)
—	DF	SVK	Ľubomír Korijkov (Released and joined (Germany) Berliner AK 07)
—	DF	SVK	Matej Hejnus (to TBA)
—	DF	SVK	Pavol Šuľák (to TBA)
—	MF	SVK	Radoslav Kamenec (to MFK Lokomotíva Zvolen)
—	MF	SVK	Martin Hloušek (End of career)
—	FW	SVK	Rastislav Chmelo (to TBA)
—	DF	SVK	Marek Boňko (to TBA)
—	FW	SVK	Adam Sovič (to TBA)
—	FW	SVK	Marcel Jass (to TBA)

=== FK Poprad ===
In: Note: Flags indicate national team as defined under FIFA eligibility rules; some limited exceptions apply. Players may hold more than one non-FIFA nationality.

No.	Pos.	Nation	Player
—	MF	SVK	Kamil Kopúnek (free agent)
—	MF	SVK	Michal Horodník (Partizán Bardejov)
—	MF	UKR	Vladyslav Apostoliuk (from FK Poprad U19)
—	MF	SVK	Jakub Vígľaš (from FK Poprad U19)
—	DF	SVK	Lukáš Urbanič (from FK Poprad U19)
—	FW	SVK	Daniel Dubec (from FC Spartak Trnava)
—	MF	SVK	Denis Jančo (on loan from AS Trenčín)

Out: Note: Flags indicate national team as defined under FIFA eligibility rules; some limited exceptions apply. Players may hold more than one non-FIFA nationality.

No.	Pos.	Nation	Player
—	MF	POL	Szymon Gruca (to Partizán Bardejov)
—	DF	SVK	Tomáš Peciar (Released)
—	MF	SVK	Lukáš Tóth (loan return to MFK Zemplín Michalovce)
—	MF	SVK	Miroslav Poliaček (Released)
—	MF	SVK	Rudolf Bilas (to ŠKF Sereď)

=== FK Inter Bratislava ===
In: Note: Flags indicate national team as defined under FIFA eligibility rules; some limited exceptions apply. Players may hold more than one non-FIFA nationality.

No.	Pos.	Nation	Player
—	MF	NGA	Pentecost Ikedinachi Obiechina (from (Nigeria) Lagos Islaners)
—	FW	NED	Milton Klooster (on loan from AS Trenčín)
—	FW	SVK	Erik Prekop (on loan from AS Trenčín)

Out: Note: Flags indicate national team as defined under FIFA eligibility rules; some limited exceptions apply. Players may hold more than one non-FIFA nationality.

No.	Pos.	Nation	Player
—	MF	BIH	Kerim Palić (Released)
—	FW	NED	Ayoub Ait Afkir (Released)

=== KFC Komárno ===
In: Note: Flags indicate national team as defined under FIFA eligibility rules; some limited exceptions apply. Players may hold more than one non-FIFA nationality.

No.	Pos.	Nation	Player

Out: Note: Flags indicate national team as defined under FIFA eligibility rules; some limited exceptions apply. Players may hold more than one non-FIFA nationality.

No.	Pos.	Nation	Player
—	FW	CZE	Roman Haša (to MFK Skalica)
—	MF	CZE	Ondřej Čtvrtníček (to MFK Skalica)

=== ŠKF Sereď ===
In: Note: Flags indicate national team as defined under FIFA eligibility rules; some limited exceptions apply. Players may hold more than one non-FIFA nationality.

No.	Pos.	Nation	Player
—	FW	SRB	Marko Milunović (From MFK Skalica)
—	MF	SVK	Rudolf Bilas (From FK Poprad )

Out: Note: Flags indicate national team as defined under FIFA eligibility rules; some limited exceptions apply. Players may hold more than one non-FIFA nationality.

No.	Pos.	Nation	Player

=== FK Spišská Nová Ves ===
In: Note: Flags indicate national team as defined under FIFA eligibility rules; some limited exceptions apply. Players may hold more than one non-FIFA nationality.

No.	Pos.	Nation	Player
—	FW	SVK	Lukáš Kubus (From Tatran Prešov)

Out: Note: Flags indicate national team as defined under FIFA eligibility rules; some limited exceptions apply. Players may hold more than one non-FIFA nationality.

No.	Pos.	Nation	Player
