= 2016–17 MŠK Žilina season =

Žilina
2016–17 season
- Manager: Adrián Guľa
- Stadium: Štadión pod Dubňom
- Slovak First Football League: 1st
- Slovak Cup: Quarter-finals
- Top goalscorer: League: Filip Hlohovský (20); All: Filip Hlohovský (21)
- Highest home attendance: 5,280 v Slovan Bratislava (26 November 2016, Slovak First Football League)
- Lowest home attendance: 1,278 v VSS Košice (14 September 2016, Slovak Cup)
- Average home league attendance: 2,925
- Biggest win: 7–0 v Spartak Trnava (Home, 6 November 2016, Slovak First Football League)
- Biggest defeat: 0–2 v Senica (Away, 18 February 2017, Slovak First Football League)

The 2016–17 season was Mestský športový klub Žilina's 21st consecutive season in Slovak First Football League. In addition to the domestic league, Žilina participated in Slovak Cup.

== Squad ==
Squad at end of season

Note: Flags indicate national team as defined under FIFA eligibility rules; some limited exceptions apply. Players may hold more than one non-FIFA nationality.

No.	Pos.	Nation	Player
1	GK	SVK	Miloš Volešák
3	DF	SVK	Denis Vavro
7	MF	MDA	Eugeniu Cociuc
8	FW	SVK	Lukáš Jánošík
9	MF	ARG	Iván Díaz
10	FW	SVK	Nikolas Špalek
11	FW	SVK	Samuel Mráz
12	MF	SVK	Viktor Pečovský (Captain)
13	MF	SVK	Filip Hlohovský
14	DF	SVK	Jakub Holúbek
15	MF	SVK	Kristián Vallo
16	DF	SVK	Dávid Hancko
17	DF	COL	Joan Herrera
19	FW	SVK	Roland Gerebenits

No.	Pos.	Nation	Player
20	MF	SVK	Michal Škvarka
21	DF	BIH	Bojan Letić
23	MF	SVK	Michal Klec
24	DF	SVK	Martin Králik
25	DF	CZE	Filip Kaša
27	DF	SVK	Róbert Mazáň
29	FW	LTU	Eligijus Jankauskas
30	GK	CZE	Aleš Mandous
33	GK	SVK	Martin Leško
34	FW	NGR	Yusuf Otubanjo
45	DF	CMR	Ernest Mabouka
66	MF	SVK	Miroslav Káčer
90	FW	AZE	Ramil Sheydayev

== Transfers ==
=== Summer ===
In: Note: Flags indicate national team as defined under FIFA eligibility rules; some limited exceptions apply. Players may hold more than one non-FIFA nationality.

No.	Pos.	Nation	Player
—	MF	GER	Christopher Mandiangu (from Free Agent)
—	MF	COL	Joan Jaramillo (from FK Iskra Borčice)
—	FW	NGR	Yusuf Otubanjo (from (Austria) FC Blau-Weiß Linz)
—	DF	CZE	Filip Kaša (from (Czech Republic) Baník Ostrava)
—	MF	SVK	Michal Klec (loan return from FK Senica)
—	GK	SVK	Martin Leško (from MŠK Žilina II)
—	FW	GAM	Momodou Ceesay (from (Israel) Maccabi Netanya F.C.)
—	MF	SVK	Jakub Holúbek (from FK AS Trenčín)
—	MF	MDA	Eugeniu Cociuc (from (Moldova) FC Dacia Chișinău)

Out: Note: Flags indicate national team as defined under FIFA eligibility rules; some limited exceptions apply. Players may hold more than one non-FIFA nationality.

No.	Pos.	Nation	Player
—	MF	SVK	László Bénes (to (Germany) Borussia Mönchengladbach)
—	GK	SVK	Patrik Le Giang (End of contract)
—	DF	CZE	Ondřej Švejdík (loan return to (Czech Republic) AC Sparta Prague)
—	DF	SVK	Tomáš Hučko (on loan to (Czech Republic) FC Baník Ostrava)
—	MF	SVK	Jakub Paur (to FK AS Trenčín)
—	FW	GAM	Momodou Ceesay (Released)

=== Winter ===
In: Note: Flags indicate national team as defined under FIFA eligibility rules; some limited exceptions apply. Players may hold more than one non-FIFA nationality.

No.	Pos.	Nation	Player
—	FW	SVK	Lukáš Čmelík (loan return from (Switzerland) FC Sion)
—	MF	LTU	Eligijus Jankauskas (from (Lithuania) Sūduva)
—	FW	SVK	Samuel Mráz (from FK Senica)
—	FW	AZE	Ramil Sheydayev (on loan from (Turkey) Trabzonspor)

Out: Note: Flags indicate national team as defined under FIFA eligibility rules; some limited exceptions apply. Players may hold more than one non-FIFA nationality.

No.	Pos.	Nation	Player
28	MF	GER	Christopher Mandiangu (Released and joined (Austria) FC Blau-Weiß Linz)
—	FW	SVK	Lukáš Čmelík (on loan to (Poland) Piast Gliwice)
—	DF	SVK	Branislav Šušolík (on loan to FK Senica)
—	FW	BIH	Nermin Haskić (on loan to (Poland) Podbeskidzie Bielsko-Biała)

== Competitions ==
=== Overview ===
Competition	First match	Last match	Starting round	Final position	Record							
Competition	First match	Last match	Starting round	Final position	Pld	W	D	L	GF	GA	GD	Win %
Slovak First Football League	17 July 2016	27 May 2017	Matchday 1	1st	30	23	4	3	82	25	+57	76.67
Slovak Cup	10 August 2016	8 March 2017	Second round	Quarter-finals	5	3	1	1	11	6	+5	60.00
Total					35	26	5	4	93	31	+62	74.29

Source: Competitions

=== Slovak First Football League ===
==== League table ====
Pos	Team	Pld	W	D	L	GF	GA	GD	Pts	Qualification or relegation
1	Žilina (C)	30	23	4	3	82	25	+57	73	Qualification for the Champions League second qualifying round
2	Slovan Bratislava	30	18	3	9	54	34	+20	57	Qualification for the Europa League first qualifying round (Note: Since the winners of the 2016–17 Slovak Cup, Slovan Bratislava, qualified for European competition based on league position, the spot awarded to the cup winners (Europa League first qualifying round) was passed to the fourth-placed team.)
3	Ružomberok	30	15	7	8	55	38	+17	52	Qualification for the Europa League first qualifying round
4	Trenčín	30	14	5	11	53	48	+5	47	Qualification for the Europa League first qualifying round
5	Podbrezová	30	12	9	9	34	31	+3	45	

Source: Niké liga (in Slovak)
Rules for classification: 1) Points; 2) Head-to-head points; 3) Head-to-head goal difference; 4) Head-to-head away goals scored; 5) Play-off.
(C) Champions

==== Results summary ====
Overall								Home						Away					
Pld	W	D	L	GF	GA	GD	Pts	W	D	L	GF	GA	GD	W	D	L	GF	GA	GD
30	23	4	3	82	25	+57	73	14	1	0	54	12	+42	9	3	3	28	13	+15

Source: Fortuna Liga

==== Results by round ====
Round	1	2	3	4	5	6	7	8	9	10	11	12	13	14	15	16	17	18	19	20	21	22	23	24	25	26	27	28	29	30	31	32	33
Ground	H	H	H	A		A	H	A	H	A	H	A	A	A	H		H	H	H	A	H	A	A	H	H	A		A	A	A	H	A	H
Result	D	W	W	W	V	L	W	W	W	W	W	W	W	D	W	V	W	W	W	L	W	D	D	W	W	W	V	W	L	W	W	W	W
Position	5	2	1	1	1	3	2	2	1	1	1	1	1	1	1	1	1	1	1	1	1	1	1	1	1	1	1	1	1	1	1	1	1
Points	1	4	7	10	10	10	13	16	19	22	25	28	31	32	35	35	38	41	44	44	47	48	49	52	55	58	58	61	61	64	67	70	73

Source: Fortuna Liga
A = Away; H = Home; W = Win; D = Draw; L = Loss; V = Void

==== Matches ====
17 July 2016 1	Žilina	2–2	DAC Dunajská Streda	Žilina
19:30 CEST (UTC+2)	Díaz 27'; Špalek 77'	Report	Michalík (yellow card) 51', (goal) 90'; Huk (yellow card) 56'; Šabala (yellow card) 59'; Vida 90'	Stadium: Štadión pod Dubňom; Attendance: 4,368; Referee: Vladimír Vnuk; Assistant referees: Miroslav Benko, Marek Galo

23 July 2016 2	Žilina	3–2	Ružomberok	Žilina
19:00 CEST (UTC+2)	Otubanjo 11', 38'; Hlohovský 70', (yellow card) 79'; Špalek (yellow card) 84'	Report	Chrien 33'; Mareš 81'	Stadium: Štadión pod Dubňom; Attendance: 2,981; Referee: Mário Vlk; Assistant referees: Martin Balko, Peter Kováč

30 July 2016 3	Žilina	4–0	Tatran Prešov	Žilina
19:00 CEST (UTC+2)	Škvarka 4'; Králik (yellow card) 6'; Otubanjo 36'; Špalek 51'; Hlohovský 69'; Vavro (yellow card) 83'	Report	Jacko (yellow card) 56'	Stadium: Štadión pod Dubňom; Attendance: 2,365; Referee: Ivan Kružliak; Assistant referees: Peter Bednár, Mário Roszbeck

7 August 2016 4	Spartak Trnava	1–2	Žilina	Trnava
19:00 CEST (UTC+2)	Bello (yellow card) 80'; Sloboda 90'	Report	Hlohovský 6'; Otubanjo 10', (yellow card) 13'; Mabouka (yellow card) 63'; Paur (yellow card) 66'; Ceesay (yellow card) 85'	Stadium: Štadión Antona Malatinského; Attendance: 5,620; Referee: Michal Smolák; Assistant referees: Tomáš Somoláni, František Ferenc

20 August 2016 6	Slovan Bratislava	1–0	Žilina	Bratislava
19:00 CEST (UTC+2)	Soumah 67', (yellow card) 89'	Report	Pečovský (yellow card) 72'; Vavro (yellow card) 73'; Káčer (yellow card) 87'	Stadium: Pasienky; Attendance: 1,264; Referee: Patrik Hrčka; Assistant referees: Martin Balko, Miroslav Benko

28 August 2016 7	Žilina	4–0	Trenčín	Žilina
19:00 CEST (UTC+2)	Hlohovský 6'; Otubanjo 22'; Špalek 54'; Díaz (yellow card) 70'; Holúbek 77'	Report		Stadium: Štadión pod Dubňom; Attendance: 3,712; Referee: Dušan Sedlák; Assistant referees: Michal Tomčík, Gabriel Ádám

10 September 2016 8	Zemplín Michalovce	0–2	Žilina	Michalovce
19:00 CEST (UTC+2)	Sipľak (yellow card) 22'; Žofčák (yellow card) 42'	Report	Špalek 14', (yellow card) 44'; Kaša 67'	Stadium: Mestský futbalový štadión Attendance: 2,685; Referee: Boris Marhefka; Assistant referees: Tomáš Mókoš, Peter Kováč

17 September 2016 9	Žilina	4–2	Senica	Žilina
17:00 CEST (UTC+2)	Škvarka 11', 60'; Králik (red card) 70'; Hlohovský 73', 83'; Pečovský (yellow card) 81'	Report	Mráz 37'; Kopičár (yellow card) 38' (red card) 42'; Březina (yellow card) 54'; Pirulo 71' (pen.); Blažek (yellow card) 72'; Delgado (yellow card) 74'	Stadium: Štadión pod Dubňom; Attendance: 1,886; Referee: Jozef Pavlík; Assistant referees: František Ferenc, Mária Súkeníková

24 September 2016 10	ViOn Zlaté Moravce	0–2	Žilina	Zlaté Moravce
19:00 CEST (UTC+2)	Kostadinov (yellow card) 6'; Pintér (yellow card) 12'; Konnsimbal (yellow card) 37'; Válovčan (yellow card) 51'	Report	Otubanjo 23'; Vavro 70' (pen.)	Stadium: Štadión FC ViOn; Attendance: 1,428; Referee: Július Straka; Assistant referees: Miroslav Benko, Juraj Lieskovský

1 October 2016 11	Žilina	1–0	Podbrezová	Žilina
17:00 CEST (UTC+2)	Otubanjo (yellow card) 34'; Mabouka (yellow card) 34'; Škvarka 50'; Vavro (yellow card) 73'	Report	Kostelný (yellow card) 30'; Vajda (yellow card) 34'; Krivák (yellow card) 79'	Stadium: Štadión pod Dubňom; Attendance: 3,008; Referee: Patrik Hrčka; Assistant referees: Tomáš Somoláni, Peter Bednár

15 October 2016 12	DAC Dunajská Streda	0–6	Žilina	Senec
20:33 CEST (UTC+2)	Kwin (yellow card) 57'	Report	Káčer 10', (yellow card) 57'; Otubanjo 18', 82'; Škvarka 30'; Špalek 32'; Hlohovský 75'	Stadium: NTC Senec; Attendance: 1,303; Referee: Dušan Sedlák; Assistant referees: Tomáš Mókoš, Dušan Hrčka

22 October 2016 13	Ružomberok	0–2	Žilina	Ružomberok
17:00 CEST (UTC+2)	Kupec (yellow card) 68'; Kružliak (yellow card) 77'	Report	Hlohovský 27'; Škvarka 64'; Mabouka (yellow card) 84'	Stadium: Štadión pod Čebraťom; Attendance: 2,339; Referee: Michal Smolák; Assistant referees: Ján Pozor, Milan Štrbo

30 October 2016 14	Tatran Prešov	1–1	Žilina	Prešov
17:30 CET (UTC+1)	Ashiru 33' (pen.); Keresteš (yellow card) 77'; Petko (yellow card) 87'	Report	Králik (yellow card) 63'; Škvarka 79'	Stadium: Tatran Stadium; Attendance: 2,418; Referee: Mário Vlk; Assistant referees: Michal Tomčík, Marek Galo

6 November 2016 15	Žilina	7–0	Spartak Trnava	Žilina
17:30 CET (UTC+1)	Káčer 9'; Králik (yellow card) 13'; Hlohovský 39', 47'; Haskić 45', 74'; Škvarka 50'; Jánošík 84'	Report	Godál (yellow card) 45'; Sloboda (yellow card) 57' (red card) 72'; Richnák (yellow card) 84'	Stadium: Štadión pod Dubňom; Attendance: 4,066; Referee: Jozef Pavlík; Assistant referees: Branislav Hancko, Ján Pozor

26 November 2016 17	Žilina	2–1	Slovan Bratislava	Žilina
17:00 CET (UTC+1)	Škvarka 20'; Hlohovský 27'; Mabouka (yellow card) 44'; Káčer (yellow card) 45'; Špalek (yellow card) 66'; Vavro (yellow card) 67'	Report	Priskin 25', (yellow card) 52'; De Marco (yellow card) 31'; Kubík (yellow card) 66'; Savićević (yellow card) 72'	Stadium: Štadión pod Dubňom; Attendance: 5,280; Referee: Dušan Sedlák; Assistant referees: Martin Balko, Miroslav Benko

3 December 2016 18	Žilina	3–0	Trenčín	Žilina
17:00 CET (UTC+1)	Díaz (yellow card) 44'; Haskić 51'; Káčer (yellow card) 60'; Špalek 78'; Hlohovský 90'	Report	Kalu (yellow card) 18'; Kvocera (yellow card) 19'; Paur (yellow card) 26'; Ket (yellow card) 90'	Stadium: Štadión pod Dubňom; Attendance: 2,009; Referee: Adam Somoláni; Assistant referees: Dušan Hrčka, František Ferenc

11 December 2016 19	Žilina	7–1	Zemplín Michalovce	Žilina
15:20 CET (UTC+1)	Špalek 10'; Podhorin 23' (o.g.); Haskić 30', 48'; Hlohovský 32', 53'; Kaša 90'	Report	Mensah 83'	Stadium: Štadión pod Dubňom; Attendance: 1,757; Referee: Kamil Horváth; Assistant referees: Gabriel Ádám, Rastislav Žákech

18 February 2017 20	Senica	2–0	Žilina	Senica
17:00 CET (UTC+1)	Ranko 16'; Turyna 88'; Blažek (yellow card) 90'	Report	Králik (yellow card) 6'; Kaša (yellow card) 20'	Stadium: OMS ARENA Senica; Attendance: 952; Referee: Mário Vlk; Assistant referees: Michal Tomčík, Ján Pozor

26 February 2017 21	Žilina	4–1	ViOn Zlaté Moravce	Žilina
17:30 CET (UTC+1)	Špalek (yellow card) 44'; Káčer 50'; Mráz 54'; Hlohovský 85'; Jánošík 90'	Report	Boszorád 42'; Yao (yellow card) 61'; Oliveira (yellow card) 68'	Stadium: Štadión pod Dubňom; Attendance: 2,135; Referee: Dušan Sedlák; Assistant referees: Tomáš Mókoš, Mário Roszbeck

5 March 2017 22	Podbrezová	2–2	Žilina	Podbrezová
15:20 CET (UTC+1)	Krivák (yellow card) 13'; Lepieš (yellow card) 19'; Turňa (yellow card) 24', (goal) 31'; Bernadina 47'; Pejović (yellow card) 90'	Report	Škvarka (yellow card) 18'; Hlohovský 30'; Kochan 75' (o.g.)	Stadium: ZELPO Aréna; Attendance: 2,065; Referee: Filip Glova; Assistant referees: Branislav Hancko, Dušan Hrčka

11 March 2017 23	DAC Dunajská Streda	2–2	Žilina	Dunajská Streda
16:30 CET (UTC+1)	Aluku (yellow card) 29'; Ljubičić 38'; Davis 67' (pen.), (yellow card) 67'; Živković (yellow card) 75'; Mészáros (yellow card) 90'	Report	Kaša 2'; Škvarka 23'; Mabouka (yellow card) 27'	Stadium: DAC Aréna; Attendance: 5,152; Referee: Peter Kráľovič; Assistant referees: Martin Balko, Erik Weiss

18 March 2017 24	Žilina	3–1	Ružomberok	Žilina
15:00 CET (UTC+1)	Mráz 60'; Káčer 65'; Hlohovský (yellow card) 87', (goal) 90'; Kaša (yellow card) 89'	Report	Kružliak (yellow card) 57'; Kupec (yellow card) 63'; Maslo 79'; Daniel (yellow card) 87'	Stadium: Štadión pod Dubňom; Attendance: 1,960; Referee: Jozef Pavlík; Assistant referees: Miroslav Benko, Gabriel Ádám

2 April 2017 25	Žilina	3–0	Tatran Prešov	Žilina
17:30 CEST (UTC+2)	Špalek 45'; Mabouka (yellow card) 56'; Vavro 74'; Sheydayev 79'	Report	Hovančík (yellow card) 6' (red card) 77'; Katona (yellow card) 38'; Leško (yellow card) 54'; Petko (yellow card) 89'	Stadium: Štadión pod Dubňom; Attendance: 2,370; Referee: Michal Smolák; Assistant referees: František Ferenc, Andrej Hrmo

9 April 2017 26	Spartak Trnava	1–2	Žilina	Zlaté Moravce
15:20 CEST (UTC+2)	Sloboda (yellow card) 57'; Čonka (yellow card) 71'; Schranz 86'	Report	Škvarka 25'; Mabouka (yellow card) 38'; Sheydayev (yellow card) 50'; Káčer (yellow card) 55'; Vavro 72' (pen.)	Stadium: Štadión FC ViOn; Attendance: 1,184; Referee: Ivan Kružliak; Assistant referees: Branislav Hancko, Rastislav Žákech

23 April 2017 28	Slovan Bratislava	0–1	Žilina	Bratislava
15:20 CEST (UTC+2)	Sekulić (yellow card) 22'; Priskin (yellow card) 41'; Saláta (yellow card) 89'	Report	Škvarka (yellow card) 64', (goal) 83'; Sheydayev (yellow card) 65'	Stadium: Pasienky; Attendance: 1,489; Referee: Patrik Hrčka; Assistant referees: Miroslav Benko, Juraj Lieskovský

28 April 2017 29	Trenčín	2–1	Žilina	Trenčín
18:00 CEST (UTC+2)	Beridze 31'; Janga 67'; Lawrence (yellow card) 85'	Report	Sheydayev 21'; Hlohovský (yellow card) 55'; Vavro (yellow card) 62'	Stadium: Štadión na Sihoti; Attendance: 2,592; Referee: Dušan Sedlák; Assistant referees: František Ferenc, Ján Pozor

6 May 2017 30	Zemplín Michalovce	0–1	Žilina	Žilina
19:00 CEST (UTC+2)		Report	Sheydayev 84'	Stadium: Štadión pod Dubňom; Attendance: 1,436; Referee: Adam Somoláni; Assistant referees: Marek Galo, Martin Borsányi

13 May 2017 31	Žilina	3–2	Senica	Žilina
19:00 CEST (UTC+2)	Mazáň 25', (yellow card) 56'; Hlohovský 45' (pen.), 68'; Otubanjo (yellow card) 90'	Report	Kováč 90'; Kopičár 90'	Stadium: Štadión pod Dubňom; Attendance: 1,754; Referee: Peter Ziemba; Assistant referees: Martin Balko, Mária Súkeníková

19 May 2017 32	ViOn Zlaté Moravce	1–4	Žilina	Zlaté Moravce
17:30 CEST (UTC+2)	Kostadinov (yellow card) 8'; Válovčan 10'; Pintér (yellow card) 71'	Report	Cociuc 27'; Špalek (yellow card) 35', (goal) 53'; Škvarka 51'; Vavro 81'	Stadium: Štadión FC ViOn; Attendance: 824; Referee: Boris Marhefka; Assistant referees: Tomáš Somoláni, Matej Barenčík

27 May 2017 33	Žilina	4–0	Podbrezová	Žilina
17:30 CEST (UTC+2)	Káčer 12'; Králik (yellow card) 78'; Sheydayev 82', 90'; Hlohovský 87'	Report	Viazanko (yellow card) 4'; Đorđević (yellow card) 31'; Krivák (yellow card) 39'	Stadium: Štadión pod Dubňom; Attendance: 4,227; Referee: Mário Vlk; Assistant referees: Branislav Hancko, Gabriel Ádám

=== Slovak Cup ===
10 August 2016 Second round	Rožňava	1–3	Žilina	Rožňava
17:00 CEST (UTC+2)	Drobňák 89'	Report	Káčer 6', (yellow card) 89'; Letić (yellow card) 26'; Špalek 58'; Mandiangu 60'	Attendance: 2,100; Referee: Anton Ihring; Assistant referees: Andrej Hrmo, Adam Jekkel

14 September 2016 Third round	Žilina	3–0	VSS Košice	Žilina
17:30 CEST (UTC+2)	Otubanjo 43'; Hlohovský 44'; Káčer 80'	Report	Vancák (yellow card) 20'; Đorđević (yellow card) 76'	Stadium: Štadión pod Dubňom; Attendance: 1,278; Referee: Martin Ježík; Assistant referees: Peter Chládek, Daniel Poláček

27 September 2016 Fourth round	Lipany	1–2	Žilina	Lipany
15:30 CEST (UTC+2)	Milyutin 25'; Popovec (yellow card) 35'; Gomoľa (yellow card) 82'	Report	Škvarka (yellow card) 84'; Otubanjo 85', 90'	Attendance: 1,150; Referee: Ľuboš Kačenga; Assistant referees: Radoslav Bobko, Martin Špivák

19 October 2016 Fifth round	Sereď	1–1 (3–5 p)	Žilina	Sereď
15:00 CEST (UTC+2)	Šálka (red card) 31'; Mečiar 76'	Report	Herrera (yellow card) 38'; Špalek 63'; Otubanjo (yellow card) 66'	Stadium: Štadión Sereď; Attendance: 720; Referee: Ladislav Prešinský; Assistant referees: Rastislav Žákech, Martin Borsányi; Fourth official: Gabriel Michlian
Note: Žilina won 5–3 on penalties.

8 March 2017 Quarter-finals	Skalica	3–2	Žilina	Skalica
14:30 CET (UTC+1)	Ulrich 16'; Človečko 21'; Vaščák (yellow card) 50'; Šebesta 79'	Report	Mráz 22', 90'; Kaša (yellow card) 35'	Stadium: Mestský štadión Skalica; Attendance: 1,520; Referee: Boris Marhefka; Assistant referees: Milan Štrbo, Matej Barenčík; Fourth official: Marek Mastiš
