= Milyutin =

Milyutin (Russian: Милютин) is a Russian masculine surname originating from the root "mil-", meaning "dear", "cute"; its feminine counterpart is Milyutina. It may refer to the following notable people:

- Dmitry Milyutin (1816–1912), Russian war minister
- Nikolay Milyutin (1818–1872), Russian statesman, brother of Dmitry
- Nikolay Alexandrovich Milyutin (1899–1942), Russian Bolshevik and urban planner
- Oleksiy Milyutin (born 1995), Ukrainian football player
- Vadim Milyutin (born 2002), Russian football player
- Vladimir Milyutin (1884–1937), Russian Bolshevik, People's Commissar of Agriculture
