= Ujlaky =

Ujlaky is a surname. Notable people with the surname include:

- Erik Ujlaky (born 1992), Slovak footballer
- Marek Ujlaky (footballer, born 1974), Slovak footballer
- Marek Ujlaky (footballer, born 2003), Slovak footballer
- Virginie Ujlaky (born 1984), Hungarian fencer
