= Peter Doležaj =

Slovak footballer

Personal information
- Full name: Peter Doležaj
- Date of birth: 5 April 1981 (age 45)
- Place of birth: Topoľčany, Czechoslovakia
- Height: 1.87 m (6 ft 2 in)
- Position: Centre back

Team information
- Current team: OFK Hrušovany

Youth career
- Topoľčany

Senior career*
Years	Team	Apps	(Gls)
2002–2003	Dubnica	42	(3)
2004–2006	Žilina	70	(5)
2006	→ Trenčín (loan)	16	(1)
2007–2010	Spartak Trnava	96	(22)
2010–2011	Olympiacos Volos	21	(4)
2011–2012	Panetolikos	23	(0)
2013–2017	Svätý Jur	46	(12)
2017–	OFK Hrušovany		

International career
2002-2003	Slovakia U-21	8	(0)
2004–2008	Slovakia	3	(0)

Managerial career
- 2015–2017: ŠK Svätý Jur (assistant)
- * Club domestic league appearances and goals as of 3 November 2013

Peter Doležaj (born 5 April 1981) is a Slovak football defender who currently plays for OFK Hrušovany.

In February 2010, he was on trial in FC Vaslui.
