= ŠK Svätý Jur =

Slovak football club

- Full name: Športový Klub Svätý Jur
- Founded: 1921; 104 years ago
- Ground: Štadión ŠK Svätý Jur; Slovakia - Svätý Jur
- Capacity: 1.500 (800 seats)
- Chairman: Peter Kučerka
- Manager: Carlos Henrique Ferreira
- League: 3. liga
- 2016–17: DOXXbet liga, 10th
- Website: http://sksvatyjur.sk/

ŠK Svätý Jur (English: St George Football Club) is a Slovak football team, based in the town of Svätý Jur. The club was founded in 1921 and their local rivals are PŠC Pezinok.

== Current squad ==
As of 25 February 2018 Note: Flags indicate national team as defined under FIFA eligibility rules; some limited exceptions apply. Players may hold more than one non-FIFA nationality.

No.	Pos.	Nation	Player
1	GK	(Tunisia) TUN	Aymen Krouma (Captain)
2	DF	(Belgium) BEL	Samuel Khan
3	DF	(France) FRA	Cissé Mahmoud
4	DF	(Slovakia) SVK	Peter Doležaj (Vice-captain)
5	DF	(Slovakia) SVK	Martin Mikušovič
6	DF	(France) FRA	Kemoko Doumbouya
7	DF	(Slovakia) SVK	Denis Achberger
7	DF	(Slovakia) SVK	Patrik Volf
8	MF	(Brazil) BRA	Matheus da Silva Lima
9	MF	(Kazakhstan) KAZ	Nursultan Baigazy

No.	Pos.	Nation	Player
10	MF	(Brazil) BRA	Gabriel Matheus da Rocha Machado
11	MF	(Brazil) BRA	Gabriel Coutinho Dominiciano
12	FW	(Slovakia) SVK	Kristián Wurst
13	MF	(Slovakia) SVK	Filip Briška
14	DF	(Kazakhstan) KAZ	Aksultan Assainov
15	FW	(France) FRA	Iven Malulu Dndolwezi
15	FW	(Ukraine) UKR	Ivan Shevchenko
16	MF	(Slovakia) SVK	Patrik Kemlage

For recent transfers, see List of Slovak football transfers winter 2016–17.

== Notable players ==
Had international caps for their respective countries. Players whose name is listed in bold represented their countries while playing for ŠK.

- (Slovakia) Henrich Benčík
- (Slovakia) Mário Breška
- (Slovakia) Peter Doležaj
- (Slovakia) František Plach
