= Associação Desportiva Confiança =

Brazilian association football club based in Aracaju, Sergipe, Brazil

Confiança
- Full name: Associação Desportiva Confiança
- Nicknames: Dragão (Dragon); Dragão do Bairro Industrial (Dragon of the Industrial Quarter); Gigante Operário (Giant Worker); Gigante Azulino (Blue Giant); Trovão Azul (Blue Thunder); Time de Tradição (Team of Tradition)
- Founded: 1 May 1936; 90 years ago
- Ground: Batistão
- Capacity: 15,500
- President: Pedro Dantas
- Head coach: Vinícius Eutrópio
- League: Campeonato Brasileiro Série C Campeonato Sergipano
- 2025 2025: Série C, 9th of 20; Sergipano, 1st of 10 (champions)
- Website: https://adconfianca.net/
Home colors	Away colors

Associação Desportiva Confiança, commonly referred to as Confiança, is a Brazilian professional club based in Aracaju, Sergipe. It competes in the Campeonato Brasileiro Série D, the fourth tier of Brazilian football, as well as in the Campeonato Sergipano, the top flight of the Sergipe state football league.

Confiança is the top ranked team from Sergipe in CBF's national club ranking, at 44th overall, and has won the state championship 24 times.

== History ==
The club was founded on May 1, 1936, with the name Associação Desportiva Confiança, after Epaminondas Vital and Isnard Cantalice watched a volleyball match and decided to create a club dedicated to volleyball and basketball.

In 1949, the club competed in its first football competition, earning the nickname Dragão do Bairro Industrial, meaning Industrial Neighborhood Dragon, and playing in blue and white colors.

On May 1, 1955, Confiança, through its paranymph, called Joaquim Sabino Ribeiro Chaves, built its stadium, named Proletário Sabino Ribeiro.

In 1976, the club played for the first time in the Campeonato Brasileiro First Division.

In 1989, the club competed in the first edition of Copa do Brasil, being eliminated in the first round by Bahia after two 0–1 defeats.

the club returned to the Campeonato Brasileiro Série B for the 2020 season, where they finished 15th, and reached the semi finals of the Copa do Nordeste. In the following season they finished 19th and were relegated.

Confiança had a good 2025 season, winning the state championship and recording their best ever campaign in the Copa do Nordeste, finishing runner-up to Bahia after losing 1-9 on aggregate.

== Honours ==
=== Official tournaments ===
State
Competitions	Titles	Seasons
Campeonato Sergipano	24	1951, 1954, 1962, 1963, 1965, 1968, 1976, 1977, 1983, 1986, 1988, 1990, 2000, 2001, 2002, 2004, 2008, 2009, 2014, 2015, 2017, 2020, 2024, 2025
Copa Governo do Estado de Sergipe	4	2003, 2005, 2008, 2012

- record

=== Others tournaments ===
==== State ====
- Taça Cidade de Aracaju (2): 2003, 2004
- Taça Estado de Sergipe (2): 2001, 2012

=== Runners-up ===
- Copa do Nordeste (1): 2025
- Campeonato Sergipano (20): 1955, 1958, 1966, 1967, 1974, 1980, 1984, 1989, 1991, 1992, 1994, 1995, 1997, 2003, 2006, 2007, 2010, 2012, 2023, 2026

=== Women's Football ===
- Campeonato Sergipano de Futebol Feminino (1): 2023

== Former Players ==
(Brazil) Jacksen F. Tiago (1990)

== Current squad ==
=== First team squad ===
As of 1 November 2026

Note: Flags indicate national team as defined under FIFA eligibility rules; some limited exceptions apply. Players may hold more than one non-FIFA nationality.

No.	Pos.	Nation	Player
—	GK	BRA	Matheus Emiliano
—	GK	BRA	Cadu
—	GK	BRA	Marcos Paulo
—	DF	BRA	Lucas Cunha (on loan from Noroeste)
—	DF	BRA	Ícaro
—	DF	BRA	Eduardo Moura
—	DF	BRA	Renilson
—	DF	BRA	Marcelo
—	DF	BRA	Weriton
—	DF	BRA	Alisson
—	DF	BRA	João Mandovani (on loan from Tombense)
—	DF	BRA	Kelvyn
—	DF	BRA	Valdir
—	DF	BRA	Mateus Ludke

No.	Pos.	Nation	Player
—	DF	BRA	Adryan
—	MF	BRA	Guilherme Nunes
—	MF	BRA	Madison
—	MF	BRA	Moisés
—	MF	BRA	Fabrício Oya
—	MF	BRA	Gabriel Zeca (on loan from Azuriz)
—	MF	BRA	Lorran
—	MF	BRA	Paulo Henrique
—	FW	BRA	Welder
—	FW	BRA	Maikon Aquino
—	FW	BRA	Luiz Thiago (on loan from América-RN)
—	FW	BRA	Danielzinho
—	FW	BRA	Iago
—	FW	BRA	Sassá

=== Reserve team ===
Note: Flags indicate national team as defined under FIFA eligibility rules; some limited exceptions apply. Players may hold more than one non-FIFA nationality.

No.	Pos.	Nation	Player

== Club name ==
The club's name means Confidence in Portuguese, and is named after a factory called Fábrica Confiança.

== Ultras ==
- Torcida Trovão Azul
- Torcida Jovem
- Movimento Azulino
