= Viktor Miklós =

Slovak footballer

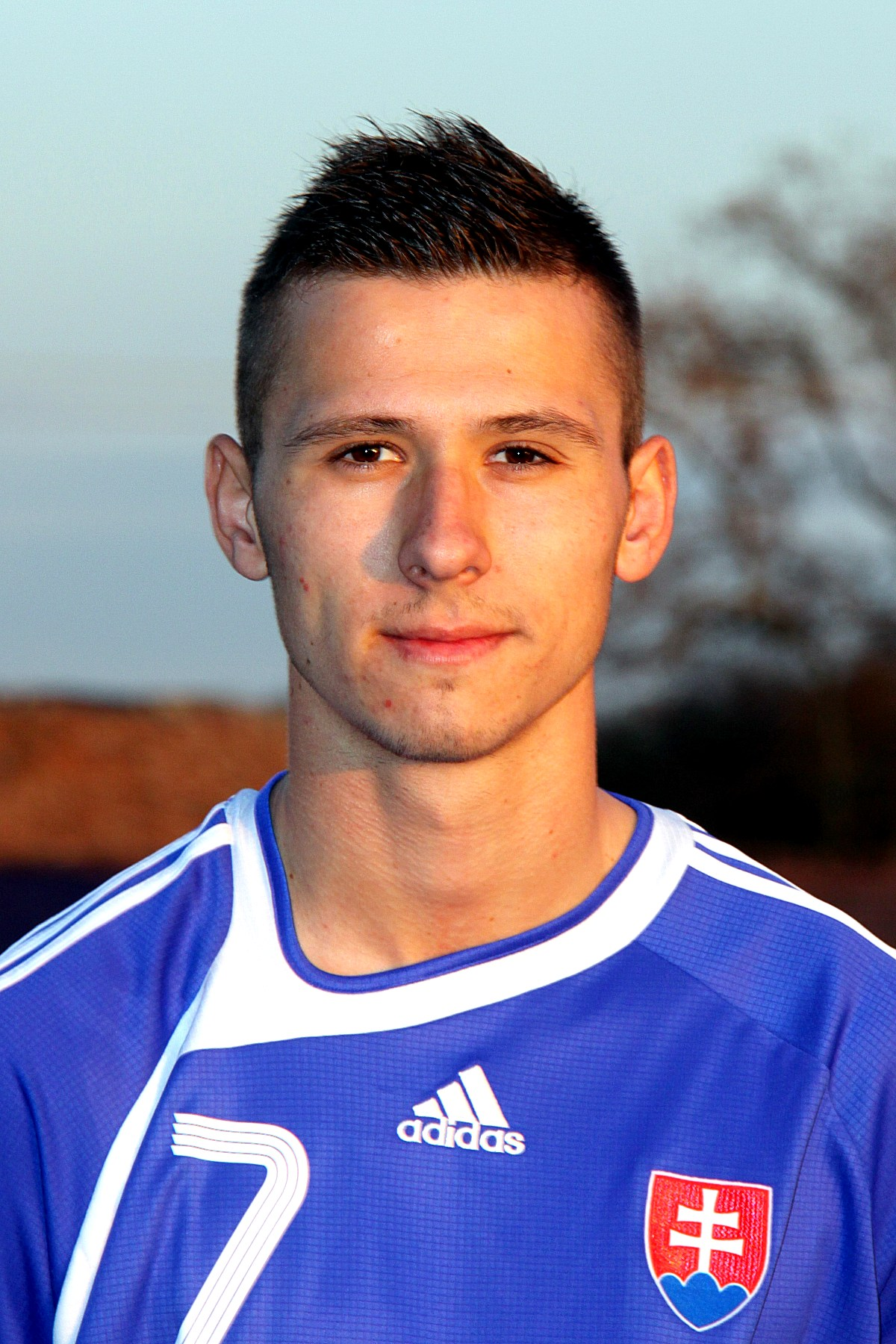

Personal information
- Full name: Viktor Miklós
- Date of birth: 20 December 1993 (age 32)
- Place of birth: Bratislava, Slovakia
- Height: 1.89 m (6 ft 2 in)
- Position: Midfielder

Team information
- Current team: FK Rača
- Number: 19

Youth career
- Dunajská Streda
- Győr

Senior career*
Years	Team	Apps	(Gls)
2010–2012	Győr II	29	(1)
2013–2016	Slovan Bratislava	1	(0)
2013–2016	→ Slovan Bratislava B	30	(3)
2013	→ Dunajská Streda (loan)	0	(0)
2015–2016	→ Dolný Kubín (loan)	6	(0)
2016	Ceglédi VSE	2	(0)
2017–	Senica	5	(0)
2018–	→ Rača (loan)		

International career^{‡}
	Slovakia U17	6	(1)
	Slovakia U19	9	(0)
- * Club domestic league appearances and goals as of 7 June 2018 ‡ National team caps and goals as of 7 January 2026

Viktor Miklós (born 20 December 1993) is a Slovak footballer who currently plays for FK Rača.

== Club career ==
Miklós started his football career in Hungarian club Györi ETO FC and in year 2013 he transferred to Slovan Bratislava. The midfielder would then go on loan to Dunajská Streda.

=== ŠK Slovan Bratislava ===
Miklós made his Corgoň Liga's debut for ŠK Slovan Bratislava on 31 May 2014 entering in as a substitute in place of Lukáš Gašparovič against FC Spartak Trnava. At his time with Slovan, Miklós mainly played for the reserve team. On 20 August 2015, he joined fellow league outfit MFK Ružomberok on a 6-month loan.

=== Later career ===
On 12 February 2017, it was announced that Miklós would be joining FK Senica, joining alongside Boris Bališ. He made his debut for the club in a 2–0 home win against eventual league winners, MŠK Žilina, playing 52 minutes of the game. Miklós would make a total of 5 appearances for Senica, playing 278 minutes altogether.

== International career ==
Miklós has 9 appearances for the Slovakia national under-19 football team. He has also played for the U16, U17 and U18s.
