= Christopher Udeh =

Nigerian footballer

Personal information
- Full name: Maduka Christopher Udeh
- Date of birth: 3 September 1997 (age 29)
- Place of birth: Ibadan, Nigeria
- Height: 1.97 m (6 ft 6 in)
- Position: Centre-back

Team information
- Current team: Øygarden
- Number: 20

Youth career
- GBS Academy

Senior career*
Years	Team	Apps	(Gls)
2015–2019	AS Trenčín	16	(2)
2017–2018	→ Tatran Prešov (loan)	25	(1)
2018	→ ViOn Zlaté Moravce (loan)	7	(1)
2020–	Øygarden	16	(1)
- * Club domestic league appearances and goals as of 7 November 2020

Maduka Christopher Udeh (born 3 September 1997) is a Nigerian footballer who plays as centre-back for Norwegian club Øygarden.

== Career ==
On 9 December 2015, Udeh signed a two-year contract with Slovak side AS Trenčín. He made his professional debut for AS Trenčín against ŠK Slovan Bratislava on 27 February 2016.
