= Zoltán Žebík =

Slovak footballer (born 1992)

Personal information
- Full name: Zoltán Žebík
- Date of birth: 3 August 1992 (age 34)
- Place of birth: Czechoslovakia
- Height: 1.91 m (6 ft 3 in)
- Position: Centre back

Youth career
- MFK Košice

Senior career*
| Years | Team | Apps | (Gls) |
| –2013 | MFK Košice | | |
| 2011 | → Michalovce (loan) | | |
| 2013–2014 | FK Slavia Orlová | | |
| 2014–2017 | MFK Košice | 10 | (1) |
| 2014 | → Vyšné Opátske (loan) | | |
| 2014 | → Moldava (loan) | 14 | (0) |
| 2017–2019 | FK Kechnec | | |
| 2019–2022 | Spartak Medzev | | |
- * Club domestic league appearances and goals

Zoltán Žebík (born 3 August 1992) is a retired Slovak footballer who is most known for playing with 2. liga club FC VSS Košice, as a centre back.

== Club career ==
=== MFK Košice ===
Žebík broke into the Košice A-team in 2015 following good performances for the reserve side. He made his professional Fortuna Liga's debut for MFK Košice on April 18, 2015 against DAC Dunajská Streda. His first league goal for Košice came in a 1–1 draw against FK Senica, scoring a header in the 25th minute.
