= Juraj Pančík =

Slovak footballer

Personal information
- Full name: Juraj Pančík
- Date of birth: 11 May 1990 (age 36)
- Place of birth: Brezno, Czechoslovakia
- Height: 1.79 m (5 ft 10 in)
- Position: Right midfielder

Team information
- Current team: ŠTK Šamorín
- Number: 7

Youth career
- ŽP Šport Podbrezová

Senior career*
Years	Team	Apps	(Gls)
2013–2017	ŽP Šport Podbrezová	82	(6)
2017	→ Šamorín (loan)	8	(1)
2017–2024	Šamorín	154	(3)
- * Club domestic league appearances and goals as of 22 June 2024

Juraj Pančík (born 11 May 1990 in Brezno) is a former Slovak professional footballer who is most known for playing as a midfielder for 2. Liga club Šamorín.

Pančík joined FC ŠTK 1914 Šamorín during the winter break of the 2016/2017 season and, after the departure of several long-time club regulars, was the second longest-serving player in the team. Only Draško Marić-Bjekić had played more.

== Club career ==
=== FO ŽP Šport Podbrezová ===
Pančík is a graduate of the Slovak club FO ŽP ŠPORT Podbrezová, with whom he helped the club get promoted to the first Slovak league after the 2013/14 season. He made his professional debut for ŽP Šport Podbrezová against Slovan Bratislava on 11 July 2014. He played in the club’s first win of the season against FK Dukla Banská Bystrica. Pančik scored his first goal for Podbrezová in a 3–3 draw against Banská Bystrica, scoring in the 50th minute to help his team take a 2–0 lead.

=== Šamorín ===
Pančík joined FC ŠTK 1914 Šamorín during the winter break of the 2016/2017 season. At first, he came to Šamorín only on a six-month loan from Podbrezová, which at that time was fighting for participation in European cups in the Fortuna League, and at that time the 26-year-old player did not get as many opportunities as in previous seasons. In a match against Partizán Bardejov, Pančík played his 100th game in the Šamorín jersey. On 18 May 2024, he retired from professional football.
