= Patrik Kemláge =

Slovak footballer

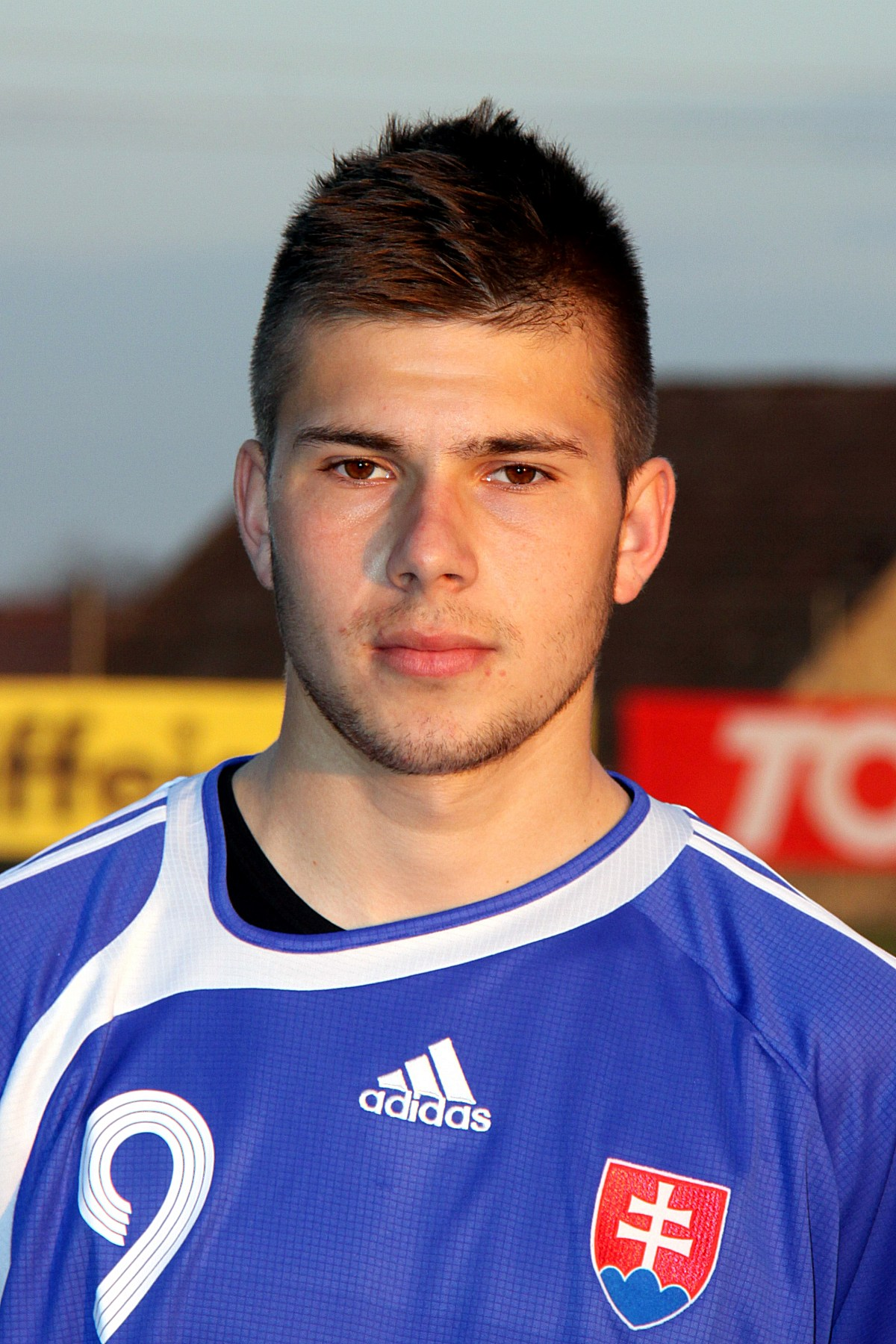

Personal information
- Full name: Patrik Kemláge
- Date of birth: 24 May 1993 (age 33)
- Place of birth: Slovakia
- Height: 1.74 m (5 ft 9 in)
- Position: Midfielder

Team information
- Current team: MFK Alekšince

Youth career
- 2001–2005: FK Rišňovce
- 2005–2011: Nitra

Senior career*
Years	Team	Apps	(Gls)
2012–2016	Nitra	27	(1)
2014–2015	→ Nové Zámky (loan)		
2016–2017	Svätý Jur	2	(1)
2017	Nitra B		
2017–	MFK Alekšince	7	(3)
- * Club domestic league appearances and goals as of 23 November 2017

Patrik Kemláge (born 24 May 1993) is a Slovak football midfielder who currently plays for MFK Alekšince.

== Career ==
Kemláge made his first Corgoň Liga appearance against FK Senica.
