= Luka Pejović (footballer, born 1994) =

Croatian footballer

Personal information
- Full name: Luka Pejović
- Date of birth: 27 July 1994 (age 32)
- Place of birth: Dubrovnik, Croatia
- Position: Midfielder

Team information
- Current team: Omladinac Lastovo

Senior career*
Years	Team	Apps	(Gls)
2016	Kurilovec		
2016	Lučko		
2017	ŽP Šport Podbrezová	1	(0)
2017	Lokomotíva Zvolen	7	(0)
2018–2019	PSV Stukenbrock		
2020	Uskok	7	(2)
2021	Krško	3	(0)
2021-	Omladinac Lastovo		
- * Club domestic league appearances and goals as of 9 February 2018

Luka Pejović (born 27 July 1994) is a Croatian footballer who plays as a midfielder.

== Club career ==
=== FO ŽP Šport Podbrezová ===
Pejović made his only Fortuna Liga for ŽP Šport Podbrezová on 5 March 2017 against MŠK Žilina, coming on as a substitute for Filip Lepieš in the second half.

He played 7 games for USKOK Klis in 2020.
