= Roman Botvynnyk =

Ukrainian footballer

Personal information
- Full name: Roman Oleksandrovych Botvynnyk
- Date of birth: 27 April 1993 (age 33)
- Place of birth: Ukraine
- Height: 1.77 m (5 ft 10 in)
- Position: Defender

Youth career
- –2010: UFC Lviv
- 2010: Enerhetyk Dobrotvir

Senior career*
Years	Team	Apps	(Gls)
2010–2012	Karpaty-2 Lviv	21	(2)
2012–2014	Hoverla Uzhhorod	0	(0)
2014–2016	Skala Stryi	34	(0)
2016	Sambir	3	(0)
2016–2017	Spišská Nová Ves	16	(2)
2017–2018	Karpaty Krosno	29	(4)
2018–2019	Mississauga		
- * Club domestic league appearances and goals

Roman Oleksandrovych Botvynnyk (Ukrainian: Роман Олександрович Ботвинник; born 27 April 1993) is a Ukrainian former professional footballer who played as a defender.

== Playing career ==
Botvynnyk played with FC Karpaty-2 Lviv in 2010 in the Ukrainian Amateur Football Championship. In 2012, he signed with FC Hoverla Uzhhorod, but signed with FC Skala Stryi in 2014 to play in the Ukrainian Second League. In 2016, he returned to the Ukrainian Amateur Football Championship to play with FC Sambir. The following season he played abroad in the 2. Liga with FK Spišská Nová Ves. In 2017, he signed with Karpaty Krosno in the III liga, and in 2018 he played abroad in the Canadian Soccer League with CSC Mississauga.
