= Illya Tereshchenko =

Ukrainian footballer

Personal information
- Full name: Illya Vahramovych Tereshchenko
- Date of birth: 27 May 1998 (age 28)
- Place of birth: Kyiv, Ukraine
- Height: 1.90 m (6 ft 3 in)
- Position: Forward

Team information
- Current team: Lyubomyr Stavyshche
- Number: 25

Youth career
- 2011–2015: Dynamo Kiev
- 2016: Zemplín Michalovce

Senior career*
Years	Team	Apps	(Gls)
2016	Zemplín Michalovce	2	(0)
2017–2019	Slovan Bratislava	1	(0)
2017	→ Slovan Bratislava B	16	(13)
2017–2018	→ Železiarne Podbrezová (loan)	12	(1)
2019	→ Slovan Duslo Šaľa (loan)	14	(0)
2019	Dinaz Vyshhorod	15	(8)
2020–2021	Slavoj Trebišov	12	(2)
2021–	Lyubomyr Stavyshche	8	(1)

International career
2014	Ukraine U17	1	(0)
- * Club domestic league appearances and goals as of 26 September 2021

Illya Vahramovych Tereshchenko (Ukrainian: Ілля Ваграмович Терещенко; born 27 May 1998), is a Ukrainian professional footballer who plays for Lyubomyr Stavyshche.

== Club career ==
Tereshchenko made his professional Fortuna Liga debut for Zemplín Michalovce against ViOn Zlaté Moravce on 5 November 2016. After Michalovce, he played for Slovan Bratislava, Železiarne Podbrezová and Slovan Duslo Šaľa.
