= Weriton =

Brazilian footballer

Personal information
- Full name: Weriton Luiz Gutierre
- Date of birth: 28 February 1992 (age 34)
- Place of birth: Olímpia, Brazil
- Height: 1.70 m (5 ft 7 in)
- Position: Winger

Team information
- Current team: Confiança

Youth career
- Santos

Senior career*
Years	Team	Apps	(Gls)
2011	Icasa	0	(0)
2012	Bahia de Feira	15	(1)
2012	Olímpia		
2013	Grêmio Barueri	5	(0)
2013	Maranhão	1	(0)
2014	Ferroviário	8	(0)
2015	União Barbarense	19	(0)
2016	Internacional de Lages	24	(0)
2016	Senica	11	(0)
2017	Tubarão	8	(0)
2017	Spišská Nová Ves	3	(0)
2018	Cuiabá	5	(0)
2018	Iraty	0	(0)
2019–2020	Cianorte	19	(0)
2019	→ Mirassol (loan)	0	(0)
2020–2021	Marcílio Dias	30	(1)
2021	Santa Cruz	13	(0)
2021–2023	XV Piracicaba	29	(0)
2022	→ Manaus (loan)	14	(0)
2023	→ Pouso Alegre (loan)	11	(0)
2024	Capital CF	7	(0)
2024	União EC	8	(0)
2025–	Confiança	46	(1)
- * Club domestic league appearances and goals as of 11 November 2026

Weriton Luiz Gutierre, commonly known as Weriton (born 28 February 1992) is a Brazilian footballer who plays as a winger for Confiança.

== Club career ==
=== Senica ===
He made his professional debut against MFK Ružomberok on 10 September 2016.
