= Andrej Kamendy =

Slovak footballer

Personal information
- Full name: Andrej Kamendy
- Date of birth: 25 October 1983 (age 43)
- Place of birth: Hlohovec, Czechoslovakia
- Height: 1.77 m (5 ft 10 in)
- Positions: Left midfielder; centre forward

Youth career
- AS Trenčín

Senior career*
Years	Team	Apps	(Gls)
2002–2003	Slavia Prague B	2	(0)
2003–2005	Komárno		
2005	→ Lučenec (loan)		
2006	Lučenec		
2006–2007	Inter Bratislava	2	(0)
2007	→ Lučenec (loan)		
2007–2010	Lučenec		
2011–2014	Ružiná		
2014–2017	Zvolen	62	(7)
- * Club domestic league appearances and goals as of 29 August 2016

Andrej Kamendy (born 25 October 1983, in Hlohovec) is a Slovak former football midfielder who last played for the 2. liga club MFK Lokomotíva Zvolen.

== Inter Bratislava ==
He made his Corgoň Liga debut for FK Inter Bratislava on 19 August 2006, against FC Nitra, the match ended 0 - 0 draw.
