= Lukáš Kubus =

Slovak footballer

Personal information
- Date of birth: 15 May 1988 (age 38)
- Place of birth: Poprad, Czechoslovakia
- Height: 1.77 m (5 ft 10 in)
- Position: Forward

Team information
- Current team: UFC Schützen am Gebirge

Youth career
- Mladosť Poprad
- Poprad

Senior career*
Years	Team	Apps	(Gls)
–2015	Poprad		
2012	→ Tatran Liptovský Mikuláš (loan)	14	(2)
2015–2016	Wisła Płock	7	(0)
2016–2017	Tatran Prešov	24	(3)
2017	Noves Spišská Nová Ves	14	(6)
2018–2019	ASV Siegendorf	58	(43)
2019–2020	ASV Kottingbrunn		
2020–2023	FSG Oberpetersdorf/Schwarzenbach		
2024–	UFC Schützen am Gebirge		
- * Club domestic league appearances and goals as of 7 April 2024

Lukáš Kubus (born 15 May 1988) is a Slovak footballer who plays as a forward for Austrian club UFC Schützen am Gebirge.

== Club career ==
=== 1. FC Tatran Prešov ===
Kubus made his professional Fortuna Liga debut for 1. FC Tatran Prešov against MFK Zemplín Michalovce on 24 July 2016.
