= Mário Breška =

Slovak footballer

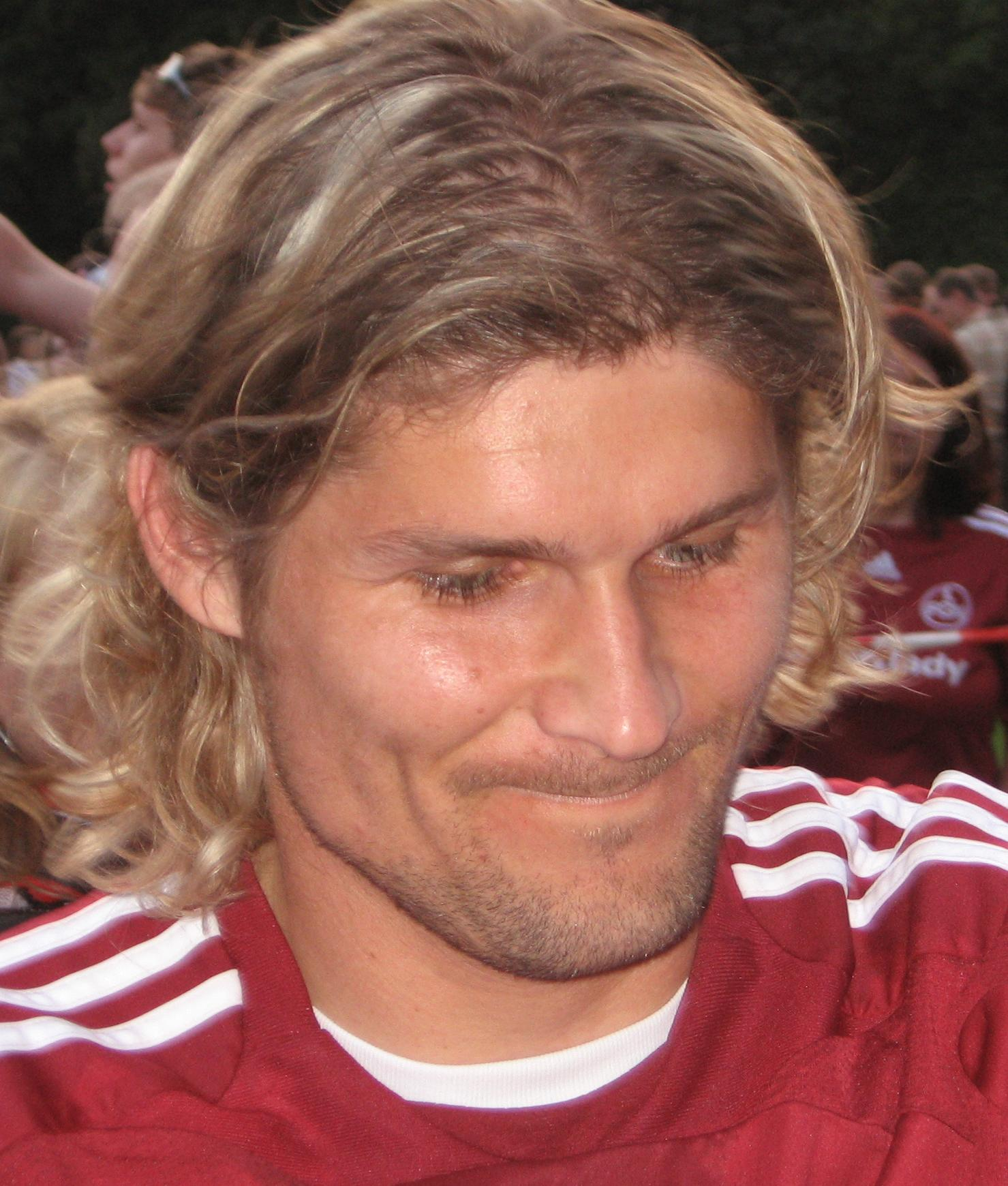
- Mário Breška in 2008

Personal information
- Full name: Mário Ľudovít Breška
- Date of birth: 27 December 1979 (age 46)
- Place of birth: Topoľčany, Czechoslovakia
- Height: 1.75 m (5 ft 9 in)
- Position: Right winger

Team information
- Current team: MFK Topvar Topoľčany
- Number: 16

Youth career
- Matador Púchov

Senior career*
Years	Team	Apps	(Gls)
1999–2000	MFK Topoľčany	0	(0)
2000–2001	Nitra	?	(23)
2001–2004	Matador Púchov	102	(23)
2004–2007	Panionios	83	(11)
2007–2008	Žilina	27	(13)
2008–2009	1. FC Nürnberg	10	(0)
2009	→ Enosis Neon Paralimni (loan)	7	(1)
2009–2010	APOEL	20	(1)
2010–2011	Olympiacos Volos	36	(8)
2011–2012	Asteras Tripolis	23	(0)
2012	Panachaiki	5	(1)
2012–2014	Olympiacos Volos	66	(14)
2014	Panargiakos		(4)
2015	Diagoras	12	(9)
2015	Svätý Jur	15	(12)
2016	Panthiraikos	7	(4)
2017	Svätý Jur	0	(0)

International career^{‡}
2003–2005	Slovakia	11	(2)
- * Club domestic league appearances and goals as of 8 January 2017 ‡ National team caps and goals as of 9 January 2017

Mário Breška (born 27 December 1979) is a Slovak former professional footballer who played as a winger.

== Career ==
=== Early years ===
Breška played for MFK Topoľčany and FC Nitra without making league appearances.

=== FK Matador Púchov ===
In 2001, Breška moved from Nitra to FK Matador Púchov. In three years, he made 102 appearances, scoring 11 goals.

=== Panionios ===
In 2004, he moved from FK Matador Púchov to Panionios for €250.000. He spent three years in Greece having scored 11 goals for the Greek Super League.

=== MŠK Žilina ===
In 2007, he moved to Žilina for a fee of €250.000. Breška finished the season having scored 13 goals.

=== 1. FC Nürnberg ===
In 2008, he moved to 1. FC Nürnberg for 350.000 €. He played ten games in total for his club in Germany. In 2009, he was loaned to Enosis Neon Paralimni. During his spell there, he scored one goal against Alki Larnaca

=== APOEL ===
He later moved to APOEL for a fee of 200.000 €. He scored his first goal against Aris Limassol F.C. During his spell with APOEL, he won the 2009 Cypriot Super Cup and he also appeared in four official group stage matches of the 2009–10 UEFA Champions League.

=== Olympiacos Volos ===
In summer 2010, he moved to Olympiacos Volos, joining them on a free transfer from APOEL. He scored his first goal against his former club, Panionios. He totally scored eight goals and he made 30 appearances. He also helped his team to qualify for the Europa League for the first time in their history and finish fifth in their league. The next season, he was released, because Olympiacos Volos were relegated to Delta Ethniki for their involvement in the match fixing scandal.

=== Asteras Tripolis ===
Later, he moved to steras Tripolis He scored his first goal against Proodeftiki in a Greek Cup match. He completed the season having made 23 appearances but he did not manage to score any goal in the league.

=== Panachaiki ===
In 2012, he moved to Panachaiki He scored his first goal for his new club against Vyzas Megara

=== 2012-2013 season ===
On 20 December 2012, he returned to Olympiacos Volos He scored his first goal against Doxa Drama in a 2–0 home win. He completed his first half season having made 31 appearances and having scored 7 goals. In total, he had a very good performance even though his team did not manage to be promoted in Super League Greece.

=== 2013-2014 season ===
Breska made his first performance of the 2013–2014 season in Olympiakos's 2–0 home victory against Panachaiki. He scored his first goal of the season in a home 4–1 win against Glyfada with a powerful shoot. His next goal came against Paniliakos and his third one against Fostiras His final match of the calendar year saw him score a goal against Acharnaikos in a 3–1 home victory. He managed to score one more goal against Glyfada F.C. in a 0–4 away win. His next two goals came in a 0–8 away victory over[Vyzas. He also scored against Fostiras in a 4–0 home win.

=== Diagoras ===
On 2015 Breska move to Rhodes to play for Diagoras at the 6th Group for the A Local Championship of Dodecanisos in an effort to get Diagoras back where he belong, the professional categories.

== International career ==
Breška played eight times for the Slovakia.
