= Denis Jančo =

Slovak footballer

Personal information
- Full name: Denis Jančo
- Date of birth: 1 August 1997 (age 29)
- Place of birth: Trenčín, Slovakia
- Height: 1.78 m (5 ft 10 in)
- Position: Midfielder

Team information
- Current team: RSC Hamsik Academy

Youth career
- AS Trenčín

Senior career*
Years	Team	Apps	(Gls)
2015–2017	AS Trenčín	19	(1)
2017	→ Górnik Zabrze (loan)	6	(0)
2017	→ Górnik Zabrze II (loan)	1	(0)
2017	→ Poprad (loan)	16	(1)
2018–2019	Poprad	51	(9)
2020–2021	ŠTK Šamorín	42	(1)
2022	Humenné	29	(3)
2023–	Hamsik Academy		

International career
2015	Slovakia U18	3	(0)
2015–2016	Slovakia U19	5	(0)
- * Club domestic league appearances and goals as of 10 February 2023

Denis Jančo (born 1 August 1997) is a Slovak professional footballer who plays as a midfielder for RSC Hamsik Academy.

== Club career ==
=== AS Trenčín ===
Jančo made his Fortuna Liga debut for AS Trenčín on 30 May 2015 against ViOn Zlaté Moravce entering in as a substitute in place of Ryan Koolwijk.

== Honours ==
AS Trenčín

- Slovak First Football League: 2014–15, 2015–16
- Slovak Cup: 2014–15, 2015–16
