= Erik Ujlaky =

Slovak footballer

Personal information
- Full name: Erik Ujlaky
- Date of birth: 13 February 1992 (age 34)
- Place of birth: Trnava, Czechoslovakia
- Height: 1.76 m (5 ft 9 in)
- Position: Winger

Team information
- Current team: USV Halbturn
- Number: 11

Youth career
- Spartak Trnava
- 2007–2009: Sparta Prague
- 2009–2010: Spartak Trnava

Senior career*
Years	Team	Apps	(Gls)
2010–2013	Sparta Prague B	12	(0)
2013–2015	Dunajská Streda	58	(4)
2015–2016	Frýdek-Místek	25	(0)
2016	Spartak Trnava B	17	(5)
2017	→ ViOn Zlaté Moravce (loan)	12	(0)
2018	FCM Traiskirchen	10	(0)
2018	SC Gattendorf		
2019	Komárno	13	(1)
2019–	USV Halbturn	62	(8)

International career
2007	Slovakia U17		
2011	Slovakia U19		
- * Club domestic league appearances and goals as of 19:13, 27 March 2023 (UTC)

Erik Ujlaky (born 13 February 1992) is a Slovak footballer who plays as a winger who plays for USV Halbturn in Austria.

== Dunajská Streda ==
He made his debut for Dunajská Streda against Slovan Bratislava on 12 July 2013.
