= Martin Válovčan =

Slovak footballer

Personal information
- Full name: Martin Válovčan
- Date of birth: 14 May 1993 (age 33)
- Place of birth: Zvolen, Slovakia
- Height: 1.78 m (5 ft 10 in)
- Positions: Winger; forward

Youth career
- Lokomotíva Zvolen
- Banská Bystrica

Senior career*
Years	Team	Apps	(Gls)
2012–2014	Banská Bystrica B		
2013–2014	→ Rimavská Sobota (loan)	29	(4)
2014	→ Liptovský Mikuláš (loan)	17	(5)
2015	→ Lokomotíva Zvolen (loan)	15	(2)
2015–2016	Žarnovica		
2016	→ Banská Bystrica (loan)	11	(2)
2016–2017	ViOn Zlaté Moravce	29	(4)
2017	Železiarne Podbrezová	8	(1)
2018	Zofingen	21	(9)
2019–2020	ViOn Zlaté Moravce	21	(2)
2020–2022	FC Langenthal	34	(6)
2022–2023	FC Brugg		
- * Club domestic league appearances and goals as of 18:55, 5 November 2023 (UTC)

Martin Válovčan (born 14 May 1993) is a Slovak footballer who plays as a winger.

== Club career ==
=== Zlaté Moravce ===
Válovčan made his professional debut for FC ViOn Zlaté Moravce against Spartak Myjava on 16 July 2016, coming on as substitute for Jozef Rejdovian. He scored and assisted a goal in a 3–0 league win against AS Trenčín. Válovčan scored a goal in a 1–1 draw against 1. FC Tatran Prešov on 3 May 2017.
