= Boris Bališ =

Slovak footballer

Personal information
- Full name: Boris Bališ
- Date of birth: 23 November 1993 (age 32)
- Place of birth: Trnava, Slovakia
- Height: 1.78 m (5 ft 10 in)
- Position: Winger

Team information
- Current team: Spartak Trnava

Youth career
- Spartak Trnava

Senior career*
Years	Team	Apps	(Gls)
2014–	Spartak Trnava	4	(0)
2015	→ Michalovce (loan)	4	(0)
2015	→ ŠK Senec (loan)	14	(2)
2017	→ Senica (loan)	8	(1)
- * Club domestic league appearances and goals as of 1 May 2017

Boris Bališ (born 23 November 1993) is a Slovak footballer who plays for Spartak Trnava as a winger.

He is the son of former footballer Igor Bališ, and the brother of Denis Bališ, who also was a footballer.

== Club career ==
He made his debut for Trnava against Slovan Bratislava on 30 October 2014.
