= Milton Klooster =

Dutch footballer

Personal information
- Full name: Milton André Alfred Klooster
- Date of birth: 26 November 1996 (age 29)
- Place of birth: Vlaardingen, Netherlands
- Height: 1.86 m (6 ft 1 in)
- Position: Forward

Team information
- Current team: Excelsior Maassluis
- Number: 22

Youth career
- Excelsior Maassluis
- Feyenoord

Senior career*
Years	Team	Apps	(Gls)
2015–2016	NEC		
2017–2018	AS Trenčín	6	(0)
2017–2018	→ Inter Bratislava (loan)	19	(1)
2018–2019	Lisse	19	(3)
2019–	Excelsior Maassluis	19	(0)
- * Club domestic league appearances and goals as of 1 August 2020

Milton Klooster (born 26 November 1996) is a Dutch professional footballer who plays as a forward for Excelsior Maassluis.

== Career ==
Klooster made his professional debut for AS Trenčín against Tatran Prešov on 4 March 2017.

== Personal life ==
Milton Klooster has a twin brother, Rodney, who is also footballer who plays for Inter Turku.
