= Kouakou Privat Yao =

Ivorian footballer (born 1991)

Kouakou Privat Yao N’goran
Personal information
- Full name: Kouakou Privat Yao N’goran
- Date of birth: 30 June 1991 (age 35)
- Place of birth: Bouaké, Ivory Coast
- Height: 1.76 m (5 ft 9 in)
- Position: Forward

Senior career*
Years	Team	Apps	(Gls)
	Cacereño	13	(0)
2014–2015	Madridejos		
2015	Blava Jaslovské Bohunice	12	(7)
2015–2017	Spartak Trnava	2	(0)
2017	→ Zlaté Moravce (loan)	9	(1)
2019	Palanga	22	(2)
- * Club domestic league appearances and goals

Kouakou Privat Yao N’goran (born 30 June 1991) is an Ivorian footballer who plays as a forward.

Yao began his career in Spain, before moving to amateur sides in the lower leagues of Slovakia. Following good performances for Jaslovské Bohunice, he joined the B team of Spartak Trnava. He later transferred to the A-team, debuting in July 2016 in the Europa League qualifiers.

== Club career ==
=== Slovakia ===
==== Jaslovské Bohunice ====
In March 2015, Yao transferred mid-season from the Spanish lower-division club CD Madridejos to FC Senec in Slovakia. He was later loaned to ŠK Blava Jaslovské Bohunice, a club competing in the 4. liga, where he debuted as an offensive midfielder in a 0–1 defeat to OK Častkovce on March 29, 2015. During his time with Blava Jaslovské Bohunice in 2015, Yao featured in 12 appearances and netted 7 goals across the 4. liga relegation phase.

==== Spartak Trnava ====
Privat Yao joined FC Spartak Trnava in the summer of 2015, beginning his time with the club's reserve team, in the DOXXbet Liga.

On 24 June 2016, Yao signed a two-year professional contract with the first team, following impressive performances in the reserves that earned him a spot in pre-season training ahead of the UEFA Europa League qualifiers. He made 3 appearances in the 2016–17 UEFA Europa League qualifying rounds. He played in a shock 1–0 away win against FK Austria Wien, coming on off the bench as a substitute in the 88th minute for Martin Mikovič. Yao made his professional Fortuna Liga debut on 31 July 2016 in a 1–1 away draw against MFK Ružomberok, playing the full match.

Over the course of the 2016/17 season, he made 2 appearances in the league, totaling 96 minutes without scoring.

==== ViOn Zlaté Moravce (loan) ====
In February 2017, Yao joined FC ViOn Zlaté Moravce on a loan for the remainder of the 2016–17 league spring season. He scored his first goal in his debut on 19 February 2017, when he scored a header in the 93rd minute to secure a 1–1 draw against league leaders MFK Ružomberok. During his time at the club, Yao made 9 appearances in the league, scoring 1 goal.

=== Later career ===
Yao later played for FK Palanga in Lithuanian top A Lyga.
