= Filip Lepieš =

Slovak footballer

Personal information
- Full name: Filip Lepieš
- Date of birth: 22 December 1999 (age 26)
- Place of birth: Slovakia
- Position: Midfielder

Team information
- Current team: ŠK Čajkov
- Number: 20

Youth career
- Levice
- 2014–2015: Senica
- 2016: ŠK Čajkov
- 2016: Virtus Entella
- 2016: Senica
- 2017–: Podbrezová

Senior career*
Years	Team	Apps	(Gls)
2017–	Podbrezová	9	(0)
2017–	→Podbrezová B	10	(0)
- * Club domestic league appearances and goals as of 6 June 2017

Filip Lepieš (Bombardér) (born 22 December 1999) is a Slovak footballer who currently plays for ŠK Čajkov as a midfielder.

== Club career ==
=== FO ŽP Šport Podbrezová ===
Lepieš made his professional Fortuna Liga's debut for FO ŽP Šport Podbrezová on 5 March 2017 against MŠK Žilina.
