= Oleksiy Milyutin =

Ukrainian footballer

Personal information
- Full name: Oleksiy Vitaliyovych Milyutin
- Date of birth: 10 June 1995 (age 31)
- Place of birth: Kyiv, Ukraine
- Height: 1.72 m (5 ft 8 in)
- Position: Left-back

Youth career
- 2008–2012: Dynamo Kyiv

Senior career*
Years	Team	Apps	(Gls)
2012–2014	Dynamo Kyiv	0	(0)
2015	Slovan Sabinov	3	(0)
2016—2017	Odeva Lipany	27	(7)
2017—2018	Tatran Prešov	12	(0)
2018	→ Baník Lehota (loan)	4	(3)
2018–2019	Baník Lehota	1	(0)
2019	Odeva Lipany (loan)	12	(0)
2019	Chayka Vyshgorod		
2020	Odeva Lipany		

International career
2012	Ukraine U18	2	(0)
- * Club domestic league appearances and goals as of 10 June 2020

Oleksiy Milyutin (also transliterated Oleksii Miliutin, Ukrainian: Олексій Віталійович Мілютін; born 10 June 1995) is a Ukrainian footballer who plays as a left-back.

== Career ==
Milyutin was born in Kyiv. He made his professional Fortuna Liga debut for Tatran Prešov on 4 August 2017 against Nitra, when he completed the entire 90 minutes of the 4–0 home defeat.
