= 2022–23 FC Tatran Prešov season =

FC Tatran Prešov
2022–23 season
- Chairman: Ľuboš Micheľ
- Head coach: Marek Petruš
- Stadium: Futbalový štadión Ličartovce
- 2. liga: 2nd
- Slovak Cup: Quarter-finals
- Top goalscorer: Jozef Dolný (19)
- Highest home attendance: 1,086 vs Myjava (1 November 2022, 2. liga); 1,388 vs Zlaté Moravce (23 May 2023, Relegation play-offs)
- Lowest home attendance: 640 vs Dubnica (1 April 2023, 2. liga)
- Average home league attendance: 813
- Biggest win: Žilina B 0–4 Tatran Prešov
- Biggest defeat: Komárno 3–0 Tatran Prešov; Šamorín 3–0 Tatran Prešov
- All statistics correct as of 20 May 2023.

The 2022–23 FC Tatran Prešov season is the 124th edition of FC Tatran Prešov's existence and their 1st season in the top flight of Slovakia football. In addition to the domestic league, FC Tatran participated in this season's editions of the Slovak Cup.

== Transfers ==
=== Summer 2022 ===
==== In ====
Note: Flags indicate national team as defined under FIFA eligibility rules; some limited exceptions apply. Players may hold more than one non-FIFA nationality.

No.	Pos.	Nation	Player
—	DF	SVK	Lukáš Šimko (from FK Slavoj Trebišov)
—	DF	SVK	Miroslav Petko (from Partizán Bardejov)
—	MF	SVK	Dávid Keresteš (from Partizán Bardejov)
—	MF	SVK	Kamil Karaš (from FC Košice)
—	DF	SVK	Lukáš Horváth (from Partizán Bardejov)
—	MF	SVK	Filip Maník (from Partizán Bardejov)
—	DF	SVK	Martin Baran (from (Poland) Znicz Pruszków)
—	FW	SRB	Dragan Andrić (from MFK Tatran Liptovský Mikuláš)
—	DF	SVK	Lukáš Jendrek (from FC Spartak Trnava)
―	MF	UKR	Yevhen Nemtinov (from (Ukraine) FC Epitsentr Dunaivtsi)
―	GK	UKR	Maksym Kuchynskyi (from (Czech Republic) 1. SC Znojmo FK)
―	MF	GRE	Antonis Gaitanidis (from (Greece) PAOK B)

==== Out ====
Note: Flags indicate national team as defined under FIFA eligibility rules; some limited exceptions apply. Players may hold more than one non-FIFA nationality.

No.	Pos.	Nation	Player
—	DF	SVK	Miroslav Petko (loan return to Partizán Bardejov)
—	MF	SVK	Kamil Karaš (loan return to FC Košice)
—	DF	SVK	Michal Berecký (to Partizán Bardejov)
—	FW	SVK	Vladimír Pyda (to Partizán Bardejov)
—	DF	POL	Paweł Jarzębak (Released)
—	MF	BRA	Junior da Silva (Released)
—	FW	SRB	Marko Milunović (to (Serbia) TBA)
—	MF	SVK	Dávid Haščák (to Partizán Bardejov)
—	DF	SVK	Ondrej Elexa (loan return to FC Košice and joined Partizán Bardejov)
—	MF	SVK	Michal Kraľovič (to ŠK Odeva Lipany)
—	GK	SVK	Adam Jozef Oravec (to OFK Tatran Kračúnovce)

=== Winter 2022–23 ===
==== In ====
Note: Flags indicate national team as defined under FIFA eligibility rules; some limited exceptions apply. Players may hold more than one non-FIFA nationality.

No.	Pos.	Nation	Player
—	DF	SVK	Richard Nagy (on loan from MŠK Žilina)
―	FW	POL	Dominik Sokół (on loan from (Poland) Radomiak Radom)
―	GK	UKR	Ivan Tyurin (from (France) GFA Rumilly-Vallières)
―	MF	POR	Tiago Matos (on loan from (Poland) Radomiak Radom)

==== Out ====
Note: Flags indicate national team as defined under FIFA eligibility rules; some limited exceptions apply. Players may hold more than one non-FIFA nationality.

No.	Pos.	Nation	Player
―	MF	GRE	Antonis Gaitanidis (Released)

== Pre-season and friendlies ==
=== 2. liga ===
==== League table ====
Pos	Team	Pld	W	D	L	GF	GA	GD	Pts	Promotion, qualification or relegation
1	Košice (C, P)	30	20	6	4	61	21	+40	66	Promotion to Fortuna liga
2	Tatran Prešov (X)	30	20	2	8	49	24	+25	62	Qualification for Promotion play-offs
3	Komárno	30	14	11	5	41	26	+15	53	
4	Žilina B	30	14	5	11	63	53	+10	47	
5	Pohronie	30	11	11	8	45	41	+4	44	
6	Slovan Bratislava U21	30	12	7	11	43	45	−2	43	
7	Spartak Myjava	30	12	7	11	46	41	+5	43	
8	Šamorín	30	12	4	14	44	50	−6	40	
9	Považská Bystrica	30	10	10	10	52	48	+4	40	
10	Púchov	30	11	5	14	47	44	+3	38	
11	Slavoj Trebišov	30	10	6	14	32	44	−12	36	
12	Petržalka	30	8	10	12	40	43	−3	34	
13	Dolný Kubín	30	10	4	16	36	60	−24	34	
14	Humenné	30	7	11	12	24	35	−11	32	
15	Rača (R)	30	6	8	16	25	52	−27	26	Relegation to 3. Liga
16	Dubnica (R)	30	6	7	17	38	59	−21	25	Relegation to 3. Liga

Updated to match(es) played on 19 May 2023. Source: druhaliga.sk (in Slovak)
Rules for classification: 1) Points; 2) Goal difference; 3) Goals scored; 4) Head-to-head results; 5) Head-to-head away goals scored; 6) Away goals scored; 7) Play-off.
(C) Champions; (P) Promoted; (R) Relegated; (X) ?

==== Results summary ====
Overall								Home						Away					
Pld	W	D	L	GF	GA	GD	Pts	W	D	L	GF	GA	GD	W	D	L	GF	GA	GD
30	20	2	8	49	24	+25	62	12	1	2	24	9	+15	8	1	6	25	15	+10

Last updated: 14 May 2023.
Source: 2. LIGA

==== Matches ====
The league fixtures were announced on 15 July 2022.

16 July 2022 1	KFC Komárno	3–0	FC Tatran Prešov	Komárno
17:00 CEST (UTC+2)	Tóth (yellow card) 4'; Ganbold 3'; Szöcs 15'; Šimko (yellow card) 44'; Mészáros 79'	Report		Stadium: Mestský štadión Komárno; Attendance: 538; Referee: Tomáš Kolofík

23 July 2022 2	FC Košice	2–1	FC Tatran Prešov	Košice
20:00 CEST (UTC+2)	Pačinda (yellow card) 50', (goal) 61'; Jonec (yellow card) 36', (goal) 64'; Gallovič (yellow card) 40'; Voleský (yellow card) 45'; Krivák (yellow card) 52'; Mizerák (yellow card) 68'	Report	Petko (yellow card) 17'; Horváth (yellow card) 34'; Milunović (yellow card) 39'; Baran 43', (yellow card) 60'	Stadium: Košická futbalová aréna Attendance: 4,011; Referee: Patrik Papuča

31 July 2022 3	FK Humenné	0–3	FC Tatran Prešov	Humenné
17:00 CEST (UTC+2)	Maťaš (yellow card) 44'; Zlacký (yellow card) 74'	Report	Dolný (yellow card) 45', (goal) 74' (pen.), 89'; Baran (yellow card) 59'; Jendrek 64'	Stadium: Štadión Humenné; Attendance: 1,700; Referee: Lukáš Dzivjak

7 August 2022 4	FC ŠTK 1914 Šamorín	3–0	FC Tatran Prešov	Šamorín
10:30 CEST (UTC+2)	P. Nagy (yellow card) 10'; Leginus 40', (yellow card) 63'; Baéz (yellow card) 65'; Owusu 71'; Marič-Bjekič (yellow card) 75'; Csóka 90'	Report	Nemtinov (yellow card) 76'; Jendrek (yellow card) 86'; Baran (yellow card) 90'	Stadium: Pomlé Stadium; Attendance: 563; Referee: Erik Gemzický

13 August 2022 5	FC Tatran Prešov	2–1	FC Petržalka	Ličartovce
17:00 CEST (UTC+2)	Šimko (yellow card) 22'; Andrić 30', (yellow card) 45'; Horváth 80'; Jendrek (yellow card) 85'; Baran (yellow card) 90'	Report	Obročník (yellow card) 12'; Harba 14', (yellow card) 52'; Sliacky (yellow card) 22'; Stašík (yellow card) 60'; Sukhar (yellow card) 70'	Stadium: Futbalový štadión Ličartovce; Attendance: 1,008; Referee: Martin Dohál

20 August 2022 6	MŠK Žilina B	0–4	FC Tatran Prešov	Žilina
10:30 CEST (UTC+2)	Gono (yellow card) 3'; Mensah (yellow card) 23' (yellow-red card) 87'	Report	Baran 4'; Petko 34'; Dolný 38' (pen.); Pribula (yellow card) 31', (goal) 41'	Stadium: Štadión pod Dubňom; Attendance: 138; Referee: Andrej Chromý

27 August 2022 7	FC Tatran Prešov	1–0	FK Slavoj Trebišov	Ličartovce
16:30 CEST (UTC+2)	Keresteš (yellow card) 56'; Horváth (yellow card) 62'; Nemtinov 64'; Milunović (yellow card) 89'; Kuchynskyi (yellow card) 90'; Gaitanidis (yellow card) 90'	Report	Novák (yellow card) 17'; Matta (yellow card) 44'; Danko (yellow card) 52'; Ikugar (yellow card) 61'; Špak (yellow card) 79'; Jenat (yellow card) 87'; Kolesár (yellow card) 90'	Stadium: Futbalový štadión Ličartovce; Attendance: 800; Referee: Boris Parilák

3 September 2022 8	FK Dubnica	0–3	FC Tatran Prešov	Dubnica nad Váhom
16:00 CEST (UTC+2)		Report	Karaš 42'; Dolný 48', 70'	Stadium: Mestský futbalový štadión Attendance: 350; Referee: Boris Marhefka

10 September 2022 9	FC Tatran Prešov	2–1	MŠK Púchov	Ličartovce
16:00 CEST (UTC+2)	Baran (yellow card) 12'; Horváth 28', (yellow card) 62'; Dolný 75' (pen.); Milunović (yellow card) 76'; Šimko (yellow card) 84'; Jendrek (yellow card) 90'	Report	Moško (yellow card) 30'; Holiš 9'; Mráz (yellow card) 45'; Strelčík (yellow card) 74'; Slovák (yellow card) 76'; Michlík (yellow card) 80'	Stadium: Futbalový štadión Ličartovce; Attendance: 837; Referee: Marián Ruc

17 September 2022 10	Slovan Bratislava B	0–3	FC Tatran Prešov	Bratislava
10:30 CEST (UTC+2)	Habodasz (yellow card) 47'; Marko (yellow card) 79'; Radulović - Veličković (yellow card) 87'	Report	Dolný 22', 37'; Jendrek 56'	Stadium: Štadión Pasienky; Attendance: 95; Referee: Tomáš Kolofík

1 November 2022 11	FC Tatran Prešov	0–1	Spartak Myjava	Ličartovce
11:00 CEST (UTC+2)	Pribula (yellow card) 72' (yellow-red card) 74'	Report	Flamik (yellow card) 36'; Pekár (yellow card) 49'; Olejník 62'	Stadium: Futbalový štadión Ličartovce; Attendance: 1,086; Referee: Erik Gemzický

9 October 2022 12	FK Rača	0–2	FC Tatran Prešov	Rača
10:30 CEST (UTC+2)	Terentyev (yellow card) 37'; Bellás (yellow card) 39'; Štefanka (red card) 85'	Report	Dolný 4'; Horváth (yellow card) 26'; Jendrek (yellow card) 44'; Gaitanidis 90'	Stadium: Štadión FK Rača; Attendance: 728; Referee: Bálint Kišš

15 October 2022 13	FC Tatran Prešov	1–0	MŠK Považská Bystrica	Ličartovce
14:30 CEST (UTC+2)	Keresteš (yellow card) 22'; Milunović 48'; Šimko (yellow card) 79'; Jendrek (yellow card) 86'; Kuchynskyi (yellow card) 90'	Report	Zuziak (yellow card) 21'; Hapal (yellow card) 39'; Matejčík (yellow card) 64'; Nagy (yellow card) 66'; Hundák (yellow card) 88'; Čiernik (yellow card) 90'	Stadium: Futbalový štadión Ličartovce; Attendance: 949; Referee: Boris Marhefka

22 October 2022 14	FC Tatran Prešov	2–0	MFK Dolný Kubín	Ličartovce
14:30 CEST (UTC+2)	Dolný 30' (pen.); Horváth 46'	Report	Lukáčik (yellow card) 29'; Lupták (yellow card) 52'; Bača (yellow card) 86'	Stadium: Futbalový štadión Ličartovce; Attendance: 825; Referee: Andrej Chromý

29 October 2022 15	FK Pohronie	0–1	FC Tatran Prešov	Žiar nad Hronom
14:30 CEST (UTC+2)	Čunta (yellow card) 50'; Mateus (yellow card) 63'	Report	Baran (yellow card) 18'; Milunović 31'; Nemtinov (yellow card) 45'; Olejár (yellow card) 62'; Karaš (yellow card) 75'; Ivanko Macej (yellow card) 90'; Pribula (yellow card) 90'	Stadium: Mestský štadión Žiar nad Hronom; Attendance: 327; Referee: Pavel Ochotnický

5 November 2022 16	FC Tatran Prešov	1–2	KFC Komárno	Ličartovce
13:00 CEST (UTC+2)	Andrić 89'; Gaitanidis (yellow card) 50'; Baran (yellow card) 51'; Petko (yellow card) 68'	Report	Varga 24'; Šmehyl (yellow card) 47', (goal) 55'; Bayemi (yellow card) 50'; Šimko (yellow card) 84'; Bréda (yellow card) 90'	Stadium: Futbalový štadión Ličartovce; Attendance: 650; Referee: Marián Ruc

12 November 2022 17	FC Tatran Prešov	2–1	FC Košice	Ličartovce
13:00 CEST (UTC+2)	Dolný 45', 53' (pen.); Horváth (yellow card) 73' (yellow-red card) 82'	Report	Sagna 13'; Majdan (yellow card) 7'; Liener (yellow card) 42'; Krivák (yellow card) 43'; Holikov (yellow card) 50'; Jonec (yellow card) 73'; Gáll (yellow card) 89'	Stadium: Futbalový štadión Ličartovce; Attendance: 938; Referee: Ivan Kružliak

25 February 2023 18	FC Tatran Prešov	2–0	FK Humenné	Ličartovce
13:30 CEST (UTC+2)	Šimko (yellow card) 11'; Dolný 24' (pen.); Olejár (yellow card) 36'; Vasiľ 46' (o.g.); Jendrek (yellow card) 55'; Sokół (yellow card) 88'	Report	Kranthove (yellow card) 44'; Diamé (yellow card) 45'; Zlacký (yellow card) 67'; Komjatý (yellow card) 81'	Stadium: Futbalový štadión Ličartovce; Attendance: 650; Referee: Pavel Ochotnický

4 March 2023 19	FC Tatran Prešov	2–1	FC ŠTK 1914 Šamorín	Ličartovce
14:00 CEST (UTC+2)	Dolný 4'; Sokół 7'	Report	Bahi (yellow card) 9'; Kachút (yellow card) 71'; Szabó 90'	Stadium: Futbalový štadión Ličartovce; Attendance: 710; Referee: Anton Ihring

12 March 2023 20	FC Petržalka	2–2	FC Tatran Prešov	Petržalka
10:30 CEST (UTC+2)	Harba 19'; Danek 25'; Kohút (yellow card) 85'; Tóth (yellow card) 90'	Report	Karaš 11'; Nagy (yellow card) 86'; Andrić 88'	Stadium: Stadium FC Petržalka 1898; Attendance: 763; Referee: Boris Marhefka

18 March 2023 21	FC Tatran Prešov	1–0	MŠK Žilina B	Ličartovce
14:30 CEST (UTC+2)	Dolný 13'; Baran (yellow card) 65'; Sokół (yellow card) 72'	Report	Kúdelčík (yellow card) 22'; Addo (yellow card) 64' (yellow-red card) 64'; Rusnák (yellow card) 70'	Stadium: Futbalový štadión Ličartovce; Attendance: 780; Referee: Marek Mastiš

25 March 2023 22	FK Slavoj Trebišov	0–2	FC Tatran Prešov	Trebišov
14:30 CEST (UTC+2)	Danko (yellow card) 52'; Kolesár (yellow card) 61'; Jenat (yellow card) 64' (yellow-red card) 70'	Report	Matos 26'; Sokół 73'	Stadium: Štadión Slavoj Trebišov; Attendance: 525; Referee: Lukáš Dzivjak

1 April 2023 23	FC Tatran Prešov	3–1	FK Dubnica	Ličartovce
15:30 CEST (UTC+2)	Dolný 9', 45' (pen.); Šimko 49'; Sokół (yellow card) 73'	Report	Šumilov (yellow card) 57'; Isaac 81'	Stadium: Futbalový štadión Ličartovce; Attendance: 640; Referee: Peter Kráľovič

8 April 2023 24	MŠK Púchov	2–1	FC Tatran Prešov	Púchov
15:30 CEST (UTC+2)	Michlík (yellow card) 39'; Pobořil (yellow card) 68'; Kaufman (yellow card) 70', (goal) 80'; Holiš (yellow card) 76', (goal) 90'	Report	Baran 9', (yellow card) 71'; Nemtinov (yellow card) 59'; Nagy (yellow card) 76'	Stadium: Mestský štadión Púchov; Attendance: 720; Referee: Ivan Kružliak

15 April 2023 25	FC Tatran Prešov	2–1	Slovan Bratislava B	Ličartovce
16:00 CEST (UTC+2)	Jendrek (yellow card) 10'; Andrić 16'; Keresteš (yellow card) 39'; Sokół 45', (yellow card) 75'	Report	Chobot 11' (pen.); Antálek (yellow card) 18'; Mičák (yellow card) 84'; Habodasz (yellow card) 90' (yellow-red card) 90'	Stadium: Futbalový štadión Ličartovce; Attendance: 810; Referee: Igor Valent

21 April 2023 26	Spartak Myjava	0–2	FC Tatran Prešov	Myjava
19:00 CEST (UTC+2)	Benovič (yellow card) 36'; Copko (yellow card) 40'; Svatík (yellow card) 68'	Report	Dolný 19', 87'; Keresteš (yellow card) 55'; Nagy (yellow card) 63'; Milunović (yellow card) 81'	Stadium: Stadium Myjava; Attendance: 523; Referee: Michal Očenáš

29 April 2023 27	FC Tatran Prešov	0–0	FK Rača	Ličartovce
16:00 CEST (UTC+2)	Matos (yellow card) 86'	Report	Bellás (yellow card) 25'; Ružička (yellow card) 29'; Sokol (yellow card) 50'; Kňažek (yellow card) 71'	Stadium: Futbalový štadión Ličartovce; Attendance: 830; Referee: Tadeáš Vaňo

6 May 2023 28	MŠK Považská Bystrica	1–0	FC Tatran Prešov	Považská Bystrica
16:00 CEST (UTC+2)	Zemko (yellow card) 39'; Gerebenits 78'; Slávik (yellow card) 87'	Report		Stadium: Štadión MŠK Považská Bystrica; Attendance: 1,240; Referee: Peter Kráľovič

12 May 2023 29	MFK Dolný Kubín	2–1	FC Tatran Prešov	Dolný Kubín
17:00 CEST (UTC+2)	Jackuliak 28'; Bača (yellow card) 40'; Farský 44'; Červeň (yellow card) 75'	Report	Karaš (yellow card) 48'; Baran (yellow card) 58'; Andrić 68'; Nagy (yellow card) 75'; Hatok (yellow card) 83'; Milunović (yellow card) 88'	Stadium: Štadión MUDr. Ivana Chodáka; Attendance: 425; Referee: Martin Dohál

19 May 2023 30	FC Tatran Prešov	3–0	FK Pohronie	Ličartovce
17:00 CEST (UTC+2)	Nemtinov 9', 29'; Prikryl 79' (o.g.)	Report	Prikryl (yellow card) 76'	Stadium: Futbalový štadión Ličartovce; Attendance: 680; Referee: Andrej Chromý

=== Relegation play-offs ===
The team which finished 11th in the Fortuna Liga, facing the 2nd team from 2. Liga for one spot in the top flight in the next season.

1st leg

23 May 2023	Tatran Prešov	1–0	Zlaté Moravce	Futbalový štadión Ličartovce, Ličartovce
15:30 CEST (UTC+02:00)	Baran 33'; Andrić (yellow card) 39'; Nagy (yellow card) 64'	Report	Suľa (yellow card) 24'; Lukáč (yellow card) 39'; Bednár (yellow card) 88'	Attendance: 1,388; Referee: Ivan Kružliak

2nd leg

26 May 2023	Zlaté Moravce	3–0	Tatran Prešov	ViOn Aréna, Zlaté Moravce
20:30 CEST (UTC+02:00)	Mondek 25', 90+1'; Šuvalija (yellow card) 68'; Ikugar 69'; Lukáč (yellow card) 90'; Múdry (yellow card) 90+5'	Report	Horváth (yellow card) 20'; Petko (yellow card) 35'; Dolný (penalty missed) 42'; Šimko (yellow card) 89' (yellow-red card) 90+6'	Attendance: 3,120; Referee: Ivan Kružliak

Zlaté Moravce won 3–1 on aggregate.

=== Slovak Cup ===
24 August 2022 Second round	Medzev	1–2	Tatran Prešov	Medzev
17:00 CET (UTC+1)	Jurčo 90'	Report	Dolný 86' (pen.); Nemtinov 89'	Stadium: Stadium MFK Spartak Medzev; Attendance: 428; Referee: Filip Glova

13 September 2022 Third round	Kechnec	2–3	Tatran Prešov	Kechnec
16:00 CET (UTC+1)	Macko (yellow card) 20'; Terpaj 40', 51'; Danko (yellow card) 50'; Palencsár (yellow card) 88'	Report	Andrić 12'; Petruš (yellow card) 63'; Nemtinov (yellow card) 78'; Baran 80'; Karaš 90'	Stadium: Stadium FK Kechnec; Attendance: 300; Referee: Pavol Greško

19 October 2022 Fourth round	Tatran Prešov	1–0	Podbrezová	Ličartovce
14:30 CET (UTC+1)	Pribula 22', (yellow card) 40'	Report	Bakaľa (yellow card) 25'; Pavúk (yellow card) 68'; Oravec (red card) 72'; Paraj (yellow card) 76'	Stadium: Futbalový štadión Ličartovce; Attendance: 984; Referee: Michal Očenáš

8 November 2022 Round of 16	Humenné	0–1	Tatran Prešov	Humenné
13:00 CET (UTC+1)	Komár (yellow card) 37'; Maťaš (yellow card) 45'; Sedláček (yellow card) 90'	Report	Dolný 16'; Maguľak (yellow card) 56'; Olejár (yellow card) 70'; Petko (yellow card) 71'; Ivanko Macej (yellow card) 82'	Stadium: Štadión Humenné; Attendance: 1,250; Referee: Boris Marhefka

7 March 2023 Quarter-finals	Tatran Prešov	0–1	Trenčín	Ličartovce
14:30 CET (UTC+1)	Petko (yellow card) 22'; Milunović (yellow card) 37'; Keresteš (yellow card) 86'	Report	Yem (yellow card) 7'; Hollý 17', (yellow card) 57'; Pires (yellow card) 86'	Stadium: Futbalový štadión Ličartovce; Attendance: 720; Referee: Marián Ruc

== See also ==
- 2022–23 2. Liga (Slovakia)
- 2022–23 Slovak Cup
- List of Slovak football transfers summer 2022
- List of Slovak football transfers winter 2022–23
