= List of Slovak football transfers summer 2022 =

Notable Slovak football transfers in the summer transfer window 2022 by club. Only transfers of the Fortuna Liga and 2. liga are included.

== Fortuna Liga ==
=== ŠK Slovan Bratislava ===
In: Note: Flags indicate national team as defined under FIFA eligibility rules; some limited exceptions apply. Players may hold more than one non-FIFA nationality.

No.	Pos.	Nation	Player
—	MF	SVK	Juraj Kucka (from Free agent)
TBA	DF	BEL	Siemen Voet (from (Netherlands) PEC Zwolle)
—	MF	SVK	Erik Daniel (loan return from (Poland) Zagłębie Lubin)
—	FW	VEN	Eric Ramírez (on loan from (Ukraine) FC Dynamo Kyiv)
—	MF	GEO	Giorgi Chakvetadze (on loan from (Belgium) Gent)
—	FW	SVN	Žan Medved (from Slovan Bratislava B)

Out: Note: Flags indicate national team as defined under FIFA eligibility rules; some limited exceptions apply. Players may hold more than one non-FIFA nationality.

No.	Pos.	Nation	Player
—	DF	BUL	Vasil Bozhikov (Released)
28	FW	SUI	Adler Da Silva (on loan to Michalovce)
—	DF	SVN	Kenan Bajrić (on loan to (Cyprus) Pafos FC)
—	FW	SVK	Samuel Mráz (loan return to (Italy) Spezia Calcio)
27	DF	SVK	Matúš Vojtko (on loan to (Croatia) Gorica)
—	FW	SVN	Alen Ožbolt (to (Slovenia) Hapoel Tel Aviv)
—	MF	SVK	Erik Daniel (to FC Spartak Trnava)
—	MF	SRB	Dejan Dražić (to (Turkey) Bodrumspor)
—	FW	NGA	Ezekiel Henty (on loan to (Cyprus) Apollon Limassol FC)
—	MF	NED	Joeri de Kamps (to (Poland) Lechia Gdańsk)

=== MFK Ružomberok ===
In: Note: Flags indicate national team as defined under FIFA eligibility rules; some limited exceptions apply. Players may hold more than one non-FIFA nationality.

No.	Pos.	Nation	Player
—	MF	SVK	Adam Brenkus (loan return from Partizán Bardejov)
—	MF	SVK	Adam Tučný (from AS Trenčín)
—	MF	SVK	Adam Morong (from ŠKF Sereď)
—	DF	SVK	Matúš Malý (from FC DAC 1904 Dunajská Streda)
—	FW	SVK	Marko Kelemen (from FC Petržalka)
—	MF	SVK	Gabriel Halabrín (from FK Senica)
—	MF	SVK	Martin Chrien (from FK Pohronie)

Out: Note: Flags indicate national team as defined under FIFA eligibility rules; some limited exceptions apply. Players may hold more than one non-FIFA nationality.

No.	Pos.	Nation	Player
—	MF	SVK	Martin Rymarenko (loan return to Dunajská Streda)
—	MF	SVK	Timotej Múdry (on loan to FC ViOn Zlaté Moravce)
—	MF	SVK	Peter Ďungel (to MFK Tatran Liptovský Mikuláš)
—	MF	SVK	Adam Brenkus (to FC ViOn Zlaté Moravce)
—	DF	SVK	Alex Holub (on loan to FK Pohronie)

=== FC Spartak Trnava ===
In: Note: Flags indicate national team as defined under FIFA eligibility rules; some limited exceptions apply. Players may hold more than one non-FIFA nationality.

No.	Pos.	Nation	Player
2	DF	SVK	Lukáš Štetina (Free Agent)
8	MF	SVK	Samuel Štefánik (Free Agent)
11	FW	NGA	Sudais Ali Baba (on loan from (Greece) Asteras Tripolis F.C.)
12	FW	NGA	Abdulrahman Taiwo (on loan from (Denmark) SønderjyskE)
17	MF	SVK	Jakub Paur (from MŠK Žilina)
20	MF	NGA	Azeez Oseni (on loan from (Nigeria) 36 Lion FC)
23	MF	SVK	Erik Daniel (from ŠK Slovan Bratislava)
72	GK	SVK	Martin Vantruba (from Dunajská Streda)

Out: Note: Flags indicate national team as defined under FIFA eligibility rules; some limited exceptions apply. Players may hold more than one non-FIFA nationality.

No.	Pos.	Nation	Player
6	MF	POL	Miłosz Kozak (Released)
8	MF	SVK	Jakub Grič (End of contract - joined (Czech Republic) České Budějovice)
17	MF	SYR	Ammar Ramadan (loan return to (Hungary) Ferencvárosi TC)
18	DF	SVK	Lukáš Jendrek (End of contract)
22	MF	SVK	Samuel Benovič (on loan to Spartak Myjava)
25	MF	NGA	Bamidele Yusuf (to (Portugal) G.D. Estoril Praia)
33	MF	SVK	Ján Vlasko (End of contract and joined MFK Skalica)
37	DF	SVK	Martin Škrtel (End of career)
45	FW	SVK	Stanislav Olejník (on loan to Spartak Myjava)
81	MF	BRA	Allecks Godinho (Released)
—	FW	NGA	Kenneth Ikugar (on loan to FK Slavoj Trebišov)

=== FC DAC 1904 Dunajská Streda ===
In: Note: Flags indicate national team as defined under FIFA eligibility rules; some limited exceptions apply. Players may hold more than one non-FIFA nationality.

No.	Pos.	Nation	Player
—	MF	SVK	Martin Rymarenko (loan return from MFK Ružomberok)
1	GK	SVK	Benjamín Száraz (loan return from MFK Zemplín Michalovce)
—	MF	SVK	Miroslav Káčer (on loan from (Czech Republic) FC Viktoria Plzeň)
—	GK	SVK	Samuel Petráš (on loan from MŠK Žilina)
—	DF	HUN	Márk Csinger (from (Italy) S.P.A.L. U19)
—	DF	GRE	Spyros Risvanis (from (Cyprus) Anorthosis Famagusta F.C.)
—	MF	SYR	Ammar Ramadan (from (Hungary) Ferencvárosi TC)
—	MF	MKD	Enis Fazlagić (on loan from (Poland) Wisła Kraków)

Out: Note: Flags indicate national team as defined under FIFA eligibility rules; some limited exceptions apply. Players may hold more than one non-FIFA nationality.

No.	Pos.	Nation	Player
—	MF	CRO	Marko Divković (to (Denmark) Brøndby IF)
—	GK	SVK	Martin Vantruba (to FC Spartak Trnava)
23	MF	BEL	Thibaud Verlinden (to (Belgium) K Beerschot VA)
—	DF	ARG	Luciano Vera (on loan to (Argentina) Deportivo Maipú)
—	DF	SVK	Matúš Malý (to MFK Ružomberok)
—	MF	SVK	Andrej Fábry (to MFK Skalica)
—	GK	CZE	Martin Jedlička (to (Czech Republic) FC Viktoria Plzeň)
—	FW	SVK	Jakub Švec (to (Czech Republic) SK Dynamo České Budějovice)
—	GK	SVK	Benjamín Száraz (to MFK Zemplín Michalovce)
—	DF	HUN	Márk Csinger (on loan to (Hungary) Győri ETO FC)
29	MF	POR	Andrezinho (to (Portugal) C.D. Santa Clara)
—	MF	SVK	Martin Rymarenko (on loan to MFK Dukla Banská Bystrica)
—	FE	HUN	Ákos Szendrei (on loan to (Hungary) Fehérvár FC)
—	FW	MDA	Ion Nicolaescu (to (Israel) Beitar Jerusalem F.C.)

=== MŠK Žilina ===
In: Note: Flags indicate national team as defined under FIFA eligibility rules; some limited exceptions apply. Players may hold more than one non-FIFA nationality.

No.	Pos.	Nation	Player
—	FW	SVK	Roland Galčík (loan return from FK Železiarne Podbrezová)
—	FW	NGA	Taofiq Jibril (loan return from FC ViOn Zlaté Moravce)
—	MF	GHA	Samuel Gidi (from (Ghana) MŠK Žilina Africa FC)
—	DF	SVK	Branislav Sluka (loan return from (Hungary) MTK Budapest FC)

Out: Note: Flags indicate national team as defined under FIFA eligibility rules; some limited exceptions apply. Players may hold more than one non-FIFA nationality.

No.	Pos.	Nation	Player
—	MF	SVK	Lukáš Jánošík (Released and joined Michalovce)
—	MF	SVK	Ján Bernát (to (Belgium) K.V.C. Westerlo)
—	MF	SVK	Jakub Paur (Released and joined FC Spartak Trnava)
—	GK	SVK	Samuel Petráš (on loan to FC DAC 1904 Dunajská Streda)
—	MF	SVK	Tibor Slebodník (on loan to Michalovce)

=== AS Trenčín ===
In: Note: Flags indicate national team as defined under FIFA eligibility rules; some limited exceptions apply. Players may hold more than one non-FIFA nationality.

No.	Pos.	Nation	Player
—	DF	CYP	Strahinja Kerkez (from (Austria) FC Juniors OÖ)
—	MF	SVK	Lukáš Ďuriška (from Free agent)
—	MF	NGA	Adewale Oladoye (from (Belgium) K.A.A. Gent)
—	GK	SVK	Matúš Sláviček (from AS Trenčín U19)
—	MF	ARG	Cristian Ramírez (from (Greece) Thesprotos F.C.)
—	GK	CPV	Vozinha (from (Cyprus) AEL Limassol)
—	MF	IDN	Witan Sulaeman (from (Poland) Lechia Gdańsk)

Out: Note: Flags indicate national team as defined under FIFA eligibility rules; some limited exceptions apply. Players may hold more than one non-FIFA nationality.

No.	Pos.	Nation	Player
—	MF	SVK	Adam Tučný (to MFK Ružomberok)
—	DF	SVK	Adrián Slávik (Released)
—	DF	SVK	Simeon Kohút (Released)
—	DF	FIN	Juha Pirinen (Released and joined (Greece) Volos F.C.)
—	DF	BRA	Ramón (Released)
—	DF	BIH	Đorđe Jovičić (Released)
—	DF	FRA	Steve Kapuadi (Released and joined (Poland) Wisła Płock)
—	FW	SVK	Erik Jendrišek (Released and joined Liptovský Mikuláš)
—	GK	CZE	Matouš Babka (Released)
—	FW	USA	Eduvie Ikoba (Released and joined (Hungary) Zalaegerszegi TE)
16	MF	SVK	Jakub Kadák (to (Switzerland) FC Luzern)
—	MF	NGA	Abdul Zubairu (to (Bosnia and Herzegovina) Zrinjski Mostar)

=== MFK Tatran Liptovský Mikuláš ===
In: Note: Flags indicate national team as defined under FIFA eligibility rules; some limited exceptions apply. Players may hold more than one non-FIFA nationality.

No.	Pos.	Nation	Player
—	DF	SVK	Richard Župa (from Partizán Bardejov)
—	MF	SVK	Peter Ďungel (from MFK Ružomberok)
—	DF	SVK	Imrich Bedecs (from (Czech Republic) FK Fotbal Třinec)
—	DF	SRB	Mihajilo Popović (from ŠKF Sereď)
—	MF	SVK	Marko Totka (from FK Senica)
—	DF	SVK	Mário Mihál (from FK Senica)
—	GK	CZE	Denis Gröger (from MFK Skalica)
—	DF	CZE	Martin Nečas (from (Czech Republic) FC Fastav Zlín)
—	FW	SVK	Erik Jendrišek (from AS Trenčín)

Out: Note: Flags indicate national team as defined under FIFA eligibility rules; some limited exceptions apply. Players may hold more than one non-FIFA nationality.

No.	Pos.	Nation	Player
—	DF	SVK	František Pavúk (loan return to FC Košice)
—	GK	CZE	Matěj Luksch (loan return to (Czech Republic) SK Dynamo České Budějovice)
—	MF	SVK	Patrik Pinte (to FC ViOn Zlaté Moravce)
—	DF	CZE	Martin Šindelář (loan return to (Czech Republic) MFK Karviná)
—	DF	SVK	Richard Nagy (loan return to MŠK Žilina)
—	DF	SVK	Kristián Flak (loan return to (Czech Republic) Sparta Prague B)
—	MF	SVK	Jakub Švec (loan return to FC DAC 1904 Dunajská Streda)
—	DF	SVK	Adam Krčík (to (Czech Republic) MFK Karviná)
—	FW	SRB	Dragan Andrić (to 1. FC Tatran Prešov)
—	DF	SVK	Dávid Krčík (to (Czech Republic) MFK Karviná)

=== MFK Zemplín Michalovce ===
In: Note: Flags indicate national team as defined under FIFA eligibility rules; some limited exceptions apply. Players may hold more than one non-FIFA nationality.

No.	Pos.	Nation	Player
—	MF	SVK	Lukáš Jánošík (from MŠK Žilina)
28	FW	SUI	Adler Da Silva (on loan from Slovan)
1	GK	SVK	Benjamín Száraz (from Dunajská Streda)
—	MF	SVK	Tibor Slebodník (on loan from MŠK Žilina)
—	DF	CZE	Michal Jeřábek (from Free agent)
—	MF	NGA	Issa Adekunle (from FK Železiarne Podbrezová)

Out: Note: Flags indicate national team as defined under FIFA eligibility rules; some limited exceptions apply. Players may hold more than one non-FIFA nationality.

No.	Pos.	Nation	Player
1	GK	SVK	Benjamín Száraz (loan return to Dunajská Streda)
79	FW	SVK	Sebastián Gembický (End of contract)
74	FW	EGY	Beso (loan return to (Egypt) Al Ahly)
14	FW	MKD	David Toshevski (loan return to (Russia) Rostov)
11	MF	GRE	Dimitrios Popovits (End of contract)
54	FW	AUT	Kubilay Yilmaz (End of contract)
6	DF	ESP	Alfonso Artabe (End of contract)
4	DF	SVK	Erik Šuľa (End of contract)
—	MF	JPN	Takuto Oshima (to (Poland) Cracovia)

=== FC ViOn Zlaté Moravce ===
In: Note: Flags indicate national team as defined under FIFA eligibility rules; some limited exceptions apply. Players may hold more than one non-FIFA nationality.

No.	Pos.	Nation	Player
—	GK	SVK	Matúš Chropovský (from FK Senica)
6	MF	SVK	Timotej Múdry (on loan from MFK Ružomberok)
—	MF	SVK	Patrik Pinte (from MFK Tatran Liptovský Mikuláš)
—	MF	SVK	Adam Brenkus (from MFK Ružomberok)
—	FW	GRE	Giannis Niarchos (from FK Senica)
—	DF	UKR	Denys Balan (from (Czech Republic) FC MAS Táborsko)
—	FW	SVK	Tomáš Vestenický (from Free agent)
—	DF	BRA	Stephano Almeida (from (Czech Republic) FC MAS Táborsko)
—	MF	BIH	Alden Šuvalija (on loan from (Czech Republic) 1. FC Slovácko)
—	MF	IDN	Egy Maulana Vikri (from Free agent)

Out: Note: Flags indicate national team as defined under FIFA eligibility rules; some limited exceptions apply. Players may hold more than one non-FIFA nationality.

No.	Pos.	Nation	Player
—	MF	SVK	Peter Kolesár (loan return to FC Spartak Trnava)
—	DF	SVK	Martin Chren (Retired)
—	DF	SVK	Martin Tóth (Released)
—	DF	SVK	Jozef Menich (Released)
—	MF	SVK	Martin Kovaľ (Released)
—	MF	GRE	Georgios Neofytidis (Released and joined (Hungary) Debreceni VSC)
—	DF	SVK	Peter Čögley (to MFK Skalica)
—	GK	SVK	Matúš Kira (to FC Košice)
—	FW	NGA	Taofiq Jibril (loan return to MŠK Žilina)
—	DF	SVK	Dávid Haspra (Released)
—	FW	SVK	Marek Švec (on loan to FK Dubnica)
—	MF	GRE	Alexandros Kyziridis (to (Hungary) Debreceni VSC)

=== FK Železiarne Podbrezová ===
In: Note: Flags indicate national team as defined under FIFA eligibility rules; some limited exceptions apply. Players may hold more than one non-FIFA nationality.

No.	Pos.	Nation	Player
—	MF	MKD	Martin Talakov (loan return from Žilina B)
—	MF	NGA	Moses Cobnan (from ŠKF Sereď)
—	MF	GHA	Ibrahim Sad (from (Ghana) Star Makers FC)
—	MF	GHA	Derrick Bonsu (from (Spain) Loja CD)
—	MF	SRB	Mirsad Miraljemović (from (Serbia) FK Partizan U18)
—	GK	SVK	Adam Danko (from FK Železiarne Podbrezová U19)
—	DF	SVK	Nicolas Šikula (from FK Železiarne Podbrezová U19)
—	MF	SVK	Andy Masaryk (from ŠK Slovan Bratislava U19)
—	MF	SVK	Damián Bariš (from (Czech Republic) FC Zbrojovka Brno)

Out: Note: Flags indicate national team as defined under FIFA eligibility rules; some limited exceptions apply. Players may hold more than one non-FIFA nationality.

No.	Pos.	Nation	Player
—	FW	SVK	Roland Galčík (loan return to MŠK Žilina)
26	MF	NGA	Issa Adekunle (to MFK Zemplín Michalovce)

=== MFK Dukla Banská Bystrica ===
In: Note: Flags indicate national team as defined under FIFA eligibility rules; some limited exceptions apply. Players may hold more than one non-FIFA nationality.

No.	Pos.	Nation	Player
—	DF	SVK	Timotej Záhumenský (from FK Pohronie)
—	MF	SVK	Lukáš Gašparovič (from FC Petržalka)
—	MF	SVK	Michal Faško (from (Czech Republic) FC Slovan Liberec)
—	DF	SVK	Adrián Slávik (from AS Trenčín)
—	FW	SVK	Matej Franko (from FC Nitra)
—	MF	SVK	Martin Rymarenko (on loan from FC DAC 1904 Dunajská Streda)

Out: Note: Flags indicate national team as defined under FIFA eligibility rules; some limited exceptions apply. Players may hold more than one non-FIFA nationality.

No.	Pos.	Nation	Player
—	FW	SVK	Matej Franko (loan return to FC Nitra)
—	MF	SVK	Sven Jurčíšin (Released and joined FK Humenné)
—	FW	SVK	Jakub Šulc (Released)
—	DF	SVK	Patrik Vajda (Released)

=== MFK Skalica ===
In: Note: Flags indicate national team as defined under FIFA eligibility rules; some limited exceptions apply. Players may hold more than one non-FIFA nationality.

No.	Pos.	Nation	Player
—	DF	SVK	Peter Čögley (from FC ViOn Zlaté Moravce)
—	FW	CZE	Roman Haša (from ŠKF Sereď)
—	MF	SVK	Andrej Fábry (from DAC Dunajská Streda)
—	DF	SVK	Marek Václav (from FC Košice)
—	MF	SVK	Denis Potoma (from ŠKF Sereď)
—	DF	SVK	Oliver Podhorín (from Free agent)
—	MF	SVK	Ján Vlasko (from FC Spartak Trnava)
—	GK	SVK	Igor Šemrinec (from FC Košice)
—	MF	CIV	Yann Michael Yao (from ŠKF Sereď)
—	FW	SVK	Jaroslav Mihalík (from FK Pohronie)

Out: Note: Flags indicate national team as defined under FIFA eligibility rules; some limited exceptions apply. Players may hold more than one non-FIFA nationality.

No.	Pos.	Nation	Player
—	FW	CZE	Patrik Voleský (to FC Košice)
—	GK	CZE	Denis Gröger (to MFK Tatran Liptovský Mikuláš)

== 2. liga ==
=== FK Pohronie ===
In: Note: Flags indicate national team as defined under FIFA eligibility rules; some limited exceptions apply. Players may hold more than one non-FIFA nationality.

No.	Pos.	Nation	Player
—	MF	SVK	Marek Netolický (from FK Pohronie U19)
—	GK	SVK	Filip Regitko (from FK Pohronie U19)
—	FW	SVK	Ondrej Cíferský (from FK Pohronie U19)
—	MF	SVK	Samuel Urgela (from Podbrezová)
—	MF	SVK	Jakub Čunta (from Šamorín)
—	FW	SVK	Viktor Tatár (from Podbrezová)
—	FW	SWE	Ardian Berisha (from Free agent)
—	DF	SVK	Vladimír Barbora (from Podbrezová)
—	DF	SVK	Alex Holub (on loan from MFK Ružomberok)
—	DF	SVK	Bálint Kren (from FK Marcelová)
—	MF	SVK	Patrik Abrahám (from KFC Komárno)
—	MF	SVK	Norbert Brodziansky (from MFK Dukla Banská Bystrica)
—	MF	BRA	Mateus (from TJ Družstevník Veľké Ludince)

Out: Note: Flags indicate national team as defined under FIFA eligibility rules; some limited exceptions apply. Players may hold more than one non-FIFA nationality.

No.	Pos.	Nation	Player
—	DF	COD	David Bangala (to (Scotland) Ayr United)
—	FW	SVK	Miloš Lačný (to (Malaysia) PDMR)
—	DF	SVK	Milan Šimčák (to (Slovenia) FC Koper)
—	DF	SVK	Dominik Špiriak (to KFC Komárno)
—	DF	SVK	Timotej Záhumenský (to MFK Dukla Banská Bystrica)
—	DF	CAN	Milovan Kapor (to RSC Hamsik Academy)
—	DF	SVN	Sandi Ćoralić (Released and joined (Slovenia) NK Brinje Grosuplje)
—	FW	SVK	Jaroslav Mihalík (to MFK Skalica)
—	MF	MLI	Ladji Mallé (to (United States) Las Vegas Lights FC)
—	MF	SVK	Martin Chrien (to MFK Ružomberok)

=== KFC Komárno ===
In: Note: Flags indicate national team as defined under FIFA eligibility rules; some limited exceptions apply. Players may hold more than one non-FIFA nationality.

No.	Pos.	Nation	Player
—	MF	SVK	Peter Štepanovský (from (Czech Republic) FC Zbrojovka Brno)
—	DF	SVK	Dominik Špiriak (from FK Pohronie)
—	FW	HUN	Benedek Kalmár (from (Hungary) Puskás Akadémia FC II)
—	GK	HUN	László Laky (from (Hungary) Komárom VSE)
—	FW	SVK	Matej Chorvát (from MŠK Námestovo)

Out: Note: Flags indicate national team as defined under FIFA eligibility rules; some limited exceptions apply. Players may hold more than one non-FIFA nationality.

No.	Pos.	Nation	Player
—	MF	SVK	Patrik Abrahám (to FK Pohronie)
—	GK	CZE	František Chmiel (to (Czech Republic) 1. SC Znojmo FK)
—	GK	SVK	Lukáš Leckéši (to ŠKF Sereď)

=== FC Košice ===
In: Note: Flags indicate national team as defined under FIFA eligibility rules; some limited exceptions apply. Players may hold more than one non-FIFA nationality.

No.	Pos.	Nation	Player
—	MF	SVK	Michal Gallo (from FC Košice U19)
—	DF	SVK	Alex Mihók (from FC Košice U19)
—	GK	SVK	Matúš Kira (from FC ViOn Zlaté Moravce)
—	FW	CZE	Patrik Voleský (from MFK Skalica)
—	DF	SVK	Ján Krivák (from (North Macedonia) KF Shkëndija)
—	DF	SVK	Vladimír Majdan (from Žilina B)
—	DF	SVK	Ján Mizerák (from MFK Skalica)
—	MF	SVK	Boris Turčák (from FC Petržalka)
—	DF	UKR	Oleksandr Holikov (from MFK Spartak Medzev)
—	FW	SEN	Landing Sagna (from (France) Bourges Foot 18)

Out: Note: Flags indicate national team as defined under FIFA eligibility rules; some limited exceptions apply. Players may hold more than one non-FIFA nationality.

No.	Pos.	Nation	Player
—	GK	SVK	Igor Šemrinec (Released and joined MFK Skalica)
20	FW	DEN	Marcus Mølvadgaard (Released and joined (Portugal) F.C. Penafiel)
—	FW	COL	José Cortés (Released)
—	DF	SVK	Matej Moško (loan return to Žilina B)
—	MF	SVK	Richard Lásik (Released and joined FC Petržalka)
—	MF	RSA	Nhlakanipho Ntuli (Released)
—	DF	SVK	Marek Václav (Released and joined MFK Skalica)
—	DF	SVK	Peter Kavka (Released)
—	DF	SVK	Filip Kis (Released)
—	MF	SVK	Dávid Guba (Released)

=== FK Humenné ===
In: Note: Flags indicate national team as defined under FIFA eligibility rules; some limited exceptions apply. Players may hold more than one non-FIFA nationality.

No.	Pos.	Nation	Player
—	MF	SVK	Sven Jurčíšin (from MFK Dukla Banská Bystrica)
—	MF	SVK	Jakub Sedláček (from FC Nitra)
—	MF	SVK	Maroš Harvila (from FK Humenné U19)
—	DF	SVK	Martin Sabol (from FK Humenné U19)
—	GK	SVK	Ondrej Vasilco (from FK Humenné U19)
—	DF	SVK	Samuel Kuc (on loan from (Poland) Stal Rzeszów)

Out: Note: Flags indicate national team as defined under FIFA eligibility rules; some limited exceptions apply. Players may hold more than one non-FIFA nationality.

No.	Pos.	Nation	Player
—	DF	SVK	Peter Šuľák (to MFK Vranov nad Topľou)
—	MF	SVK	Jozef-Šimon Turík (to MFK Snina)

=== FC ŠTK 1914 Šamorín ===
In: Note: Flags indicate national team as defined under FIFA eligibility rules; some limited exceptions apply. Players may hold more than one non-FIFA nationality.

No.	Pos.	Nation	Player
—	MF	SVK	Ján Ferleťák (from DAC Dunajská Streda U19)
—	DF	SVK	Adrián Lehotský (from DAC Dunajská Streda U19)
—	MF	SVK	Bálint Csóka (from DAC Dunajská Streda U19)
—	DF	UKR	Dmytro Dobranskyi (from FC ŠTK 1914 Šamorín U19)
—	DF	UKR	Mykola Yarosh (from OFK SIM Raslavice)
—	MF	SEN	Mame Wade (on loan from DAC Dunajská Streda)
—	MF	GAM	Hassim Badjie (on loan from DAC Dunajská Streda)
—	MF	SVK	Máté Szolgai (on loan from DAC Dunajská Streda)
—	GK	SVK	Attila Horváth (on loan from DAC Dunajská Streda)
—	MF	SVK	Ferenc Bögi (on loan from DAC Dunajská Streda)
—	FW	SVK	Lukáš Szabó (from (Hungary) Dorogi FC)
—	MF	SVK	David Kudláč (from FK Senica)

Out: Note: Flags indicate national team as defined under FIFA eligibility rules; some limited exceptions apply. Players may hold more than one non-FIFA nationality.

No.	Pos.	Nation	Player
—	MF	SVK	Jakub Čunta (to FK Pohronie)
—	DF	SVK	Tomáš Stašík (to FC Petržalka)
—	FW	GHA	Ernest Boateng (loan return to DAC Dunajská Streda)
—	DF	GRE	Konstantinos Ikonomou (Released)
—	MF	UKR	Vladyslav Khomutov (Released)
—	GK	SVK	Michal Trnovský (on loan to DAC Dunajská Streda)
—	MF	SVK	Juraj Štefanka (loan return to PFK Piešťany and joined FK Rača)

=== FC Petržalka ===
In: Note: Flags indicate national team as defined under FIFA eligibility rules; some limited exceptions apply. Players may hold more than one non-FIFA nationality.

No.	Pos.	Nation	Player
—	MF	SVK	Juraj Piroska (from FK Senica)
—	MF	SVK	Richard Lásik (from FC Košice)
—	FW	SVK	Roland Gerebenits (from (Cyprus) Enosis Neon Paralimni FC)
—	DF	SVK	Marek Pittner (from FC Rohožník)
—	DF	SVK	Timotej Petrišák (from DAC Dunajská Streda U19)
—	MF	SVK	Martin Privrel (from FC Rohožník)
—	DF	SVK	Tomáš Stašík (from FC ŠTK 1914 Šamorín)
—	MF	SVK	Filip Bobrovský (from DAC Dunajská Streda U19)
—	FW	SVK	Filip Tomovič (from FC Rohožník)
—	MF	SVK	Dionýz Alex (from AS Trenčín U19)
—	DF	SVK	Simeon Kohút (from AS Trenčín)
—	DF	UKR	Tymofiy Sukhar (from (Ukraine) FC Zorya Luhansk)

Out: Note: Flags indicate national team as defined under FIFA eligibility rules; some limited exceptions apply. Players may hold more than one non-FIFA nationality.

No.	Pos.	Nation	Player
—	DF	SVK	Jakub Nemec (to (Austria) ASV Siegendorf)
93	MF	SVK	Lukáš Gašparovič (to FK Dukla Banská Bystrica)
—	MF	SVK	Boris Turčák (to FC Košice)
—	MF	SVK	Jakub Hronec (to (Austria) ASK Mannersdorf)
—	FW	SVK	Marko Kelemen (to MFK Ružomberok)
—	DF	SVK	Lukáš Krisztín (Released)
—	DF	SVK	Oliver Slivka (Released)
—	DF	SVK	Simon Vlasák (Released)
—	MF	SVK	Tomáš Nagy (Released)
—	FW	SVK	Patrik Bombík (Released)
—	GK	UKR	Vadym Shevchuk (to TBA)
—	DF	SVK	Matúš Kuník (to TBA)

=== MŠK Žilina B ===
In: Note: Flags indicate national team as defined under FIFA eligibility rules; some limited exceptions apply. Players may hold more than one non-FIFA nationality.

No.	Pos.	Nation	Player
—	FW	SVK	Timotej Kudlička (from Spartak Trnava U19)
—	FW	SRB	Boris Krstić (from (Serbia) FK Partizan U19)
—	DF	CMR	Antoin Essomba (from (The Gambia) Gambinos Stars Africa)
—	MF	CMR	James Ndjeungoue (from (The Gambia) Gambinos Stars Africa)

Out: Note: Flags indicate national team as defined under FIFA eligibility rules; some limited exceptions apply. Players may hold more than one non-FIFA nationality.

No.	Pos.	Nation	Player
—	MF	MKD	Martin Talakov (loan return to FK Železiarne Podbrezová)
—	DF	GHA	Abasa Aremeyaw (Released and joined (United States) Philadelphia Union)
—	DF	SVK	Marián Tandara (on loan to (Czech Republic) FK Fotbal Třinec)

=== FK Slavoj Trebišov ===
In: Note: Flags indicate national team as defined under FIFA eligibility rules; some limited exceptions apply. Players may hold more than one non-FIFA nationality.

No.	Pos.	Nation	Player
—	MF	SVK	Edvard Lajčiak (from Slavoj Trebišov U19)
—	FW	SVK	Samuel Kovalčin (from MFK Zemplín Michalovce U19)
—	MF	SVK	Peter Kolesár (on loan from FC Spartak Trnava)
—	DF	SVK	Dávid Špak (from KFC Komárno)
—	MF	SVK	Stanislav Danko (from ŠKF Sereď)
—	GK	NGA	Ayotunde Ikuepamitan (from ŠKF Sereď)
—	DF	SVK	Samuel Jenat (on loan from FK Pohronie)
—	GK	SVK	Filip Dlubáč (on loan from FK Železiarne Podbrezová)
—	FW	NGA	Kenneth Ikugar (on loan from FC Spartak Trnava)
—	MF	SVK	Adrián Mokoš (from FC Nitra)
—	MF	NGA	Ridwan Sanusi (on loan from ŠKF Sereď)
—	DF	SVK	Martin Kolesár (on loan from MFK Zemplín Michalovce)

Out: Note: Flags indicate national team as defined under FIFA eligibility rules; some limited exceptions apply. Players may hold more than one non-FIFA nationality.

No.	Pos.	Nation	Player
—	GK	SVN	Marko Deronja (Released)
—	GK	SVK	Tomáš Dráb (loan return to MFK Zemplín Michalovce)
—	DF	SVK	Michal Krajňak (to MFK Vranov nad Topľou)
—	DF	SVK	Lukáš Šimko (to 1. FC Tatran Prešov)
—	DF	SVK	Tomáš Filipiak (loan return to MFK Ružomberok)
—	DF	SVK	Timotej Maguľak (Released)
—	MF	ESP	José Casado (Released)
—	FW	BRA	Rômulo (Released)
—	FW	SVK	Matúš Digoň (to MFK Vranov nad Topľou)
—	FW	SVK	Roland Černák (loan return to FK Humenné)
—	FW	POL	Piotr Strączek (Released)
—	FW	SVK	Peter Rypák (Released)
—	FW	SVK	Peter Belko (Released)
—	MF	SVK	Filip Pálfi (to (Czech Republic) 1. SC Znojmo FK)
—	MF	SVK	Edvard Lajčiak (on loan to TJ Slavoj Kráľovský Chlmec)

=== FK Dubnica ===
In: Note: Flags indicate national team as defined under FIFA eligibility rules; some limited exceptions apply. Players may hold more than one non-FIFA nationality.

No.	Pos.	Nation	Player
—	DF	SVK	Robert Štefánek (loan return from (Czech Republic) FC Vysočina Jihlava)
—	DF	POR	Rodrigo Macedo (from (Portugal) Imortal D.C.)
—	DF	POR	Pedro Caeiro (from (Portugal) Moncarapachense)
—	FW	SVK	Marek Švec (on loan from FC ViOn Zlaté Moravce)
—	FW	SVK	Thomas Kotlár (from FC Spartak Trnava)
—	DF	CZE	Ivan Šumilov (from TJ Tatran Cementáreň Ladce)
—	FW	RUS	Beka Dzhanelidze (from (Russia) FC Chernomorets Novorossiysk)

Out: Note: Flags indicate national team as defined under FIFA eligibility rules; some limited exceptions apply. Players may hold more than one non-FIFA nationality.

No.	Pos.	Nation	Player

=== MŠK Púchov ===
In: Note: Flags indicate national team as defined under FIFA eligibility rules; some limited exceptions apply. Players may hold more than one non-FIFA nationality.

No.	Pos.	Nation	Player
—	MF	CZE	Jan Kaufman (from (Czech Republic) Sparta Prague U19)
—	DF	CZE	Tobiáš Slovák (from (Czech Republic) Zlín B)
—	DF	SVK	Urban Mazanovský (on loan from AS Trenčín)
—	DF	SVK	Matej Moško (from MŠK Žilina)
—	MF	SVK	Csaba Biricz (from AS Trenčín)

Out: Note: Flags indicate national team as defined under FIFA eligibility rules; some limited exceptions apply. Players may hold more than one non-FIFA nationality.

No.	Pos.	Nation	Player
—	DF	SVK	Dominik Straňák (to (Czech Republic) FK Fotbal Třinec)
—	DF	SVK	Matúš Pavlovčík (loan return to FK Slovan Duslo Šaľa)

=== FK Rača ===
In: Note: Flags indicate national team as defined under FIFA eligibility rules; some limited exceptions apply. Players may hold more than one non-FIFA nationality.

No.	Pos.	Nation	Player
—	MF	SVK	Juraj Štefanka (on loan from PFK Piešťany)
—	MF	SVK	Marek Výbošťok (on loan from MŠK Žilina)
—	DF	UKR	Vladyslav Terentyev (from MŠK Námestovo)
—	FW	SVK	Lukáš Csáno (from Partizán Bardejov)
—	MF	SVK	Marcel Plavnik (on loan from SFC Kalinkovo)
—	DF	SVK	Milan Sekera (on loan from FC Spartak Trnava)
—	MF	SVK	Matej Ružička (on loan from FK Slovan Ivanka pri Dunaji)
—	DF	SVK	Patrik Lörincz (from FK Inter Bratislava)
—	MF	SVK	Šimon Kováč (from FC Nitra)
—	FW	SVK	Matej Palacka (from FKM Nové Zámky)
—	FW	SVK	Pavol Bellás (from FK Inter Bratislava)

Out: Note: Flags indicate national team as defined under FIFA eligibility rules; some limited exceptions apply. Players may hold more than one non-FIFA nationality.

No.	Pos.	Nation	Player
—	MF	SVK	Anton Bednár (Released)
—	DF	SVK	Matej Havrila (Released)
—	DF	SVK	Lukáš Maďarík (Released)
—	DF	SVK	Michal Polčic (Released)
—	DF	SVK	Dávid Štedl (Released)
—	MF	HUN	Gábor Bagdán (Released)
—	MF	SVK	Peter Peregrim (Released)

=== MŠK Považská Bystrica ===
In: Note: Flags indicate national team as defined under FIFA eligibility rules; some limited exceptions apply. Players may hold more than one non-FIFA nationality.

No.	Pos.	Nation	Player
—	MF	CZE	Ondřej Hapal (from (Czech Republic) Sigma Olomouc B)
—	DF	SVK	Šimon Gabriš (from (Czech Republic) Slovácko B)
—	DF	SVK	Matej Vaculík (from (Austria) FC Deutschkreutz)

Out: Note: Flags indicate national team as defined under FIFA eligibility rules; some limited exceptions apply. Players may hold more than one non-FIFA nationality.

No.	Pos.	Nation	Player
—	GK	SVK	Fabián Čiernik (to TJ Partizán Prečín)
—	DF	SVK	Roman Častulín (to (Czech Republic) FC Strání)
—	MF	SVK	Jakub Bambúch (to TJ Spartak Vysoká nad Kysucou)

=== MFK Dolný Kubín ===
In: Note: Flags indicate national team as defined under FIFA eligibility rules; some limited exceptions apply. Players may hold more than one non-FIFA nationality.

No.	Pos.	Nation	Player
—	MF	SVK	Samuel Farský (on loan from MŠK Žilina)
—	DF	SVK	Jakub Mrkva (on loan from ŠK Javorník Makov)
—	MF	SVK	Tomáš Kubík (on loan from MFK Ružomberok)
—	MF	SVK	Roman Zemko (from Partizán Bardejov)

Out: Note: Flags indicate national team as defined under FIFA eligibility rules; some limited exceptions apply. Players may hold more than one non-FIFA nationality.

No.	Pos.	Nation	Player

=== 1. FC Tatran Prešov ===
In: Note: Flags indicate national team as defined under FIFA eligibility rules; some limited exceptions apply. Players may hold more than one non-FIFA nationality.

No.	Pos.	Nation	Player
—	DF	SVK	Lukáš Šimko (from FK Slavoj Trebišov)
—	DF	SVK	Miroslav Petko (from Partizán Bardejov)
—	MF	SVK	Dávid Keresteš (from Partizán Bardejov)
—	MF	SVK	Kamil Karaš (from FC Košice)
—	DF	SVK	Lukáš Horváth (from Partizán Bardejov)
—	MF	SVK	Filip Maník (from Partizán Bardejov)
—	DF	SVK	Martin Baran (from (Poland) Znicz Pruszków)
—	FW	SRB	Dragan Andrić (from MFK Tatran Liptovský Mikuláš)
―	DF	SVK	Lukáš Jendrek (from FC Spartak Trnava)
―	MF	UKR	Yevhen Nemtinov (from (Ukraine) FC Epitsentr Dunaivtsi)
―	GK	UKR	Maksym Kuchynskyi (from (Czech Republic) 1. SC Znojmo FK)
―	MF	GRE	Antonis Gaitanidis (from (Greece) PAOK B)

Out: Note: Flags indicate national team as defined under FIFA eligibility rules; some limited exceptions apply. Players may hold more than one non-FIFA nationality.

No.	Pos.	Nation	Player
—	DF	SVK	Miroslav Petko (loan return to Partizán Bardejov)
—	MF	SVK	Kamil Karaš (loan return to FC Košice)
—	DF	SVK	Michal Berecký (to Partizán Bardejov)
—	FW	SVK	Vladimír Pyda (to Partizán Bardejov)
—	DF	POL	Paweł Jarzębak (Released)
—	MF	BRA	Junior da Silva (Released)
—	FW	SRB	Marko Milunović (to (Serbia) TBA)
—	MF	SVK	Dávid Haščák (to Partizán Bardejov)
—	DF	SVK	Ondrej Elexa (loan return to FC Košice and joined Partizán Bardejov)
—	MF	SVK	Michal Kraľovič (to ŠK Odeva Lipany)
—	GK	SVK	Adam Jozef Oravec (to OFK Tatran Kračúnovce)

=== Spartak Myjava ===
In: Note: Flags indicate national team as defined under FIFA eligibility rules; some limited exceptions apply. Players may hold more than one non-FIFA nationality.

No.	Pos.	Nation	Player
—	DF	CZE	Jiří Pafka (from (Czech Republic) Zlín B)
—	MF	SVK	Samuel Benovič (on loan from FC Spartak Trnava)
—	FW	SVK	Stanislav Olejník (on loan from FC Spartak Trnava)
—	FW	SVK	Filip Buchel (from FK Senica)
—	MF	SVK	Jakub Buchel (from FK Senica)
—	MF	SVK	Jakub Tancík (on loan from FC Nitra)
—	GK	SVK	Tomáš Odráška (from FK Senica)

Out: Note: Flags indicate national team as defined under FIFA eligibility rules; some limited exceptions apply. Players may hold more than one non-FIFA nationality.

No.	Pos.	Nation	Player
—	MF	SVK	Tomáš Kóňa (End of career)

=== ŠK Slovan Bratislava B ===
In: Note: Flags indicate national team as defined under FIFA eligibility rules; some limited exceptions apply. Players may hold more than one non-FIFA nationality.

No.	Pos.	Nation	Player
—	DF	SVK	Lukáš Koprna (from FK Senica)
—	MF	SVK	Alexander Tóth (from ŠKF Sereď)
—	FW	SVN	Žan Medved (loan return from (Slovenia) NK Celje)

Out: Note: Flags indicate national team as defined under FIFA eligibility rules; some limited exceptions apply. Players may hold more than one non-FIFA nationality.

No.	Pos.	Nation	Player
—	FW	SVK	Roman Čerepkai (to (Czech Republic) FK Teplice)
—	DF	SVK	Adam Laczkó (to (Czech Republic) SK Líšeň)
—	FW	SVN	Žan Medved (to ŠK Slovan Bratislava)
—	MF	SVK	Patrik Haramia (to FC - Žolík Malacky)
