= 2024–25 Radomiak Radom season =

Radomiak Radom
2024–25 season
- Manager: Bruno Baltazar
- Stadium: Czachor Brothers Stadium
- Ekstraklasa: 14th
- Polish Cup: Round of 32
- Top goalscorer: League: Leonardo Rocha (10); All: Leonardo Rocha (10)
Home colours	Away colours	Third colours

The 2024–25 season is the 115th season in the history of Radomiak Radom, and the club's fourth consecutive season in Ekstraklasa. In addition to the domestic league, the team is scheduled to participate in the Polish Cup.

== Transfers ==
=== In ===
Pos.	Player	Transferred from	Fee	Date	Source
FW	(Poland) Dominik Stępień	(Poland) Chełmianka Chełm	Loan return	30 June 2024	
DF	(Poland) Kacper Wiatrak	(Poland) Chełmianka Chełm	Loan return	30 June 2024	
DF	(Ivory Coast) Zié Ouattara	(Portugal) União de Leiria	Free	1 July 2024	
MF	(Poland) Radosław Cielemęcki	(Poland) Wisła Płock	Free	10 July 2024	
DF	(Azerbaijan) Rahil Mammadov	(Poland) ŁKS Łódź	Free	17 July 2024	
MF	(Lithuania) Paulius Golubickas	(Lithuania) Žalgiris	Free	7 January 2025	
DF	(Cameroon) Steve Kingue	(Lithuania) FC Hegelmann	Undisclosed	8 January 2025	

=== Out ===
Pos.	Player	Transferred to	Fee	Date	Source
MF	(Poland) Michał Kaput	(Poland) Piast Gliwice	Loan return	30 June 2024	
DF	(Portugal) Tiago Matos	(Portugal) Torreense	End of contract	1 July 2024	
MF	(Cape Verde) Lisandro Semedo	(Poland) Wieczysta Kraków	End of contract	1 July 2024	
FW	(Poland) Dominik Sokół	(Poland) Znicz Pruszków	End of contract	1 July 2024	
GK	(Poland) Filip Majchrowicz	(Poland) Górnik Zabrze	End of contract	1 July 2024	
MF	(Portugal) Luís Machado	(Hong Kong) Kitchee	Undisclosed	5 July 2024	
DF	(Poland) Kacper Wiatrak	(Poland) Chełmianka Chełm		5 July 2024	
FW	(Poland) Dominik Stępień	(Poland) Chełmianka Chełm		15 July 2024	

== Friendlies ==
=== Pre-season ===
26 June 2024 Friendly	Radomiak Radom (Poland)	3–0	(Poland) Korona Kielce	Radom
12:00 UTC+2	Wolski 17'; Grzesik 27'; Sokół 64'			Stadium: Centrum Sportowo-Szkoleniowe Radomiak

3 July 2024 Friendly	Cracovia (Poland)	0–1	(Poland) Radomiak Radom	Warka
17:05 UTC+2			Rocha 27' (pen.)	Stadium: Hotel Sielanka nad Pilicą

4 July 2024 Friendly	Radomiak Radom (Poland)	3–2	Israel U23	Stadion 100-lecia Odzyskania Niepodległości

11 July 2024 Friendly	Radomiak Radom (Poland)	0–2	(Israel) Ironi Tiberias	Puławy
18:15 UTC+2			Bilenkyi 27'; Talias 42'	Stadium: stadion MOSiR

12 July 2024 Friendly	Radomiak Radom (Poland)	1–1	(Poland) Motor Lublin	Radom
13:30 UTC+2	Rocha 53'		Wolski 17'	Stadium: Centrum Sportowo-Szkoleniowe Radomiak

== Competitions ==
=== Overall record ===
Competition	First match	Last match	Starting round	Record							
Competition	First match	Last match	Starting round	Pld	W	D	L	GF	GA	GD	Win %
Ekstraklasa	20 July 2024	24–25 May 2025	Matchday 1	3	1	0	2	5	6	−1	33.33
Polish Cup				0	0	0	0	0	0	+0	—
Total				3	1	0	2	5	6	−1	33.33

Last updated: 9 August 2024
Source: Soccerway

=== Ekstraklasa ===
==== League table ====
Pos	Team	Pld	W	D	L	GF	GA	GD	Pts
10	Piast Gliwice	34	11	12	11	37	36	+1	45 (Note: Ranked based on head-to-head points: Piast Gliwice 4 pts, Korona Kielce - 1 pt.)
11	Korona Kielce	34	11	12	11	37	45	−8	45
12	Radomiak Radom	34	11	8	15	48	52	−4	41
13	Widzew Łódź	34	11	7	16	38	49	−11	40
14	Lechia Gdańsk	34	10	7	17	44	59	−15	37

Source: ekstraklasa.org 90minut.pl
Rules for classification: 1) Points; 2) Head-to-head points; 3) Head-to-head goal difference; 4) Goal difference; 5) Goals scored; 6) Number of wins; 7) Number of away wins; 8) Lower number of points based on yellow and red cards (red card = 3 points, yellow card = 1 point, sending-off = 3 points - including 1 point for first yellow card); 9) Fairplay ranking; 10) Draw.
(Note: Head-to-head record is used only after all the matches between the teams in question have been played)

==== Results summary ====
Overall								Home						Away					
Pld	W	D	L	GF	GA	GD	Pts	W	D	L	GF	GA	GD	W	D	L	GF	GA	GD
3	1	0	2	5	6	−1	3	0	0	2	3	5	−2	1	0	0	2	1	+1

Last updated: 9 August 2024.
Source: Worldfootball

==== Results by round ====
Round	1	2	3	4
Ground	A	H	A	H
Result	W	L	P	L
Position	6	9		

Updated to match(es) played on 9 August 2024. Source: Worldfootball
A = Away; H = Home; W = Win; D = Draw; L = Loss

==== Matches ====
20 July 2024 1	GKS Katowice	1–2	Radomiak Radom	Katowice
14:45	Repka (yellow card) 65'; Marzec 83'		Leonardo Rocha 24', 37', (yellow card) 90+4'; Vagner (yellow card) 53'; Grzesik (yellow card) 54'; Jordão (yellow card) 82'; Peglow (yellow card) 89'	Stadium: GKS Katowice Stadium; Attendance: 6,720; Referee: Paweł Raczkowski

27 July 2024 2	Radomiak Radom	2–3	Jagiellonia Białystok	Radom
17:30 UTC+2	Rocha 52' (pen.), 77'		Kubicki 34', 40'; Abramowicz (yellow card) 48'; Villar 88'	Stadium: Czachor Brothers Stadium; Referee: Piotr Lasyk

9 August 2024 4	Radomiak Radom	1–2	Górnik Zabrze	Radom
18:00 UTC+2				Stadium: Czachor Brothers Stadium

TBD 3	Śląsk Wrocław	v	Radomiak Radom	Wrocław
17:30				Stadium: Wrocław Stadium
Note: The match, originally scheduled for 4 August 2024, was postponed due to the participation of Śląsk Wrocław in the UEFA Conference League.
