= Száraz =

Száraz is a surname. Notable people with the surname include,

- András Száraz (born 1966), Hungarian figure skater
- Benjamín Száraz (born 1998), Slovak footballer
- Evelin Száraz (born 2005), Hungarian Paralympic swimmer
- Marika Száraz (born 1947), Hungarian textile artist
