= Keresteš =

Keresteš is a surname. Notable people with the surname include:

- Dávid Keresteš (born 1995), Slovak footballer
- Miroslav Keresteš (born 1989), Slovak footballer
