= Drab =

Drab may refer to:

- Drab (color), a dull light brown color
- Olive drab, a shade of green

== See also ==
- Dráb (feminine: Drábová), Czech and Slovak surname
