= Drábek =

Drábek (feminine: Drábková) is a Czech and Slovak surname, a diminutive of Dráb. Notable people with the surname include:

- David Drábek (born 1970), Czech playwright and theatre director
- Dietmar Drabek (born 1965), Austrian football referee
- Doug Drabek (born 1962), American baseball player
- Jaromír Drábek (born 1965), Czech politician
- Kyle Drabek (born 1987), American baseball player
- Tomasz Drabek (born 1873), Polish actor
- Václav Drábek (born 1976), Czech ice hockey player
