= Leonardo Rocha (footballer) =

Portuguese footballer (born 1997)

Personal information
- Full name: Leonardo Miramar Rocha
- Date of birth: 23 May 1997 (age 29)
- Place of birth: Almada, Portugal
- Height: 2.00 m (6 ft 7 in)
- Position: Forward

Team information
- Current team: JEF United Chiba
- Number: 45

Youth career
- 2006–2007: Amora
- 2007–2008: Colégio Guadalupe
- 2008–2010: Belenenses
- 2010: Vitória Setúbal
- 2011: Boavista
- 2011–2012: Pescara
- 2012: Ituano
- 2013–2014: Barra
- 2014: Amora
- 2015–2017: Monaco

Senior career*
| Years | Team | Apps | (Gls) |
| 2016 | Monaco B | 1 | (0) |
| 2017 | Vicenza | 0 | (0) |
| 2017–2018 | Leganés B | 10 | (3) |
| 2018 | → Ontinyent (loan) | 9 | (3) |
| 2018–2019 | Lommel | 26 | (16) |
| 2019–2022 | Eupen | 19 | (0) |
| 2020–2021 | → RWDM47 (loan) | 13 | (7) |
| 2022–2023 | Lierse | 17 | (12) |
| 2023–2025 | Radomiak Radom | 56 | (21) |
| 2025–2026 | Raków Częstochowa | 32 | (3) |
| 2025 | → Zagłębie Lubin (loan) | 11 | (7) |
| 2026– | JEF United Chiba | 0 | (0) |
- * Club domestic league appearances and goals as of 19:05, 29 May 2026 (UTC)

Leonardo Miramar Rocha (born 23 May 1997) is a Portuguese professional footballer who plays as a forward for J1 League club JEF United Chiba.

== Career ==
Born in Almada to a Brazilian father, Rocha represented nine different clubs during his youth career, and finished his formation with AS Monaco FC. He made his senior debut with the B-team on 26 November 2016, playing the last 11 minutes in a 2–1 loss against US Colomiers for the CFA championship.

Rocha terminated his contract with Monaco on 30 January 2017, and joined Serie B side Vicenza Calcio on 1 February. He did not play for the club during his six-month spell, and subsequently moved to Spain with CD Leganés, being assigned to the reserves in Tercera División.

Rocha scored his first senior goal on 1 October 2017, scoring his team's third in a 3–1 home defeat of CDF Tres Cantos. The following 31 January, after three goals in ten matches, he was loaned to Segunda División B side Ontinyent CF until June.

On 19 July 2018, Rocha switched teams and countries again after signing for Lommel SK in the Belgian First Division B. He made his professional debut on 3 August, starting in a 1–0 home win against Royale Union Saint-Gilloise.

Rocha scored his first professional goal on 17 August 2018, netting a last-minute winner in a 2–1 away success over KV Mechelen. On 6 October, he scored a hat-trick in a 3–1 home win against K.S.V. Roeselare. He finished the campaign with 16 goals, being the division's top goalscorer as his side narrowly avoided relegation.

Remaining in Belgium, Rocha signed a three-year contract with First Division A side KAS Eupen on 23 July 2019. The fee was €500,000. In 2020–21, he was loaned back to the second tier at RWDM47 where he was the club's top scorer. On 10 October 2020, he scored a hat-trick for the Molenbeek-based club in an 8–1 victory at Union Rochefortoise in the fifth round of the national cup.

On 16 August 2022, Rocha signed a two-year contract with Lierse.

On 13 January 2023, Rocha joined Polish Ekstraklasa side Radomiak Radom until June 2026, becoming their record signing for a reported fee of approx. €150,000.

On 10 January 2025, he was transferred to Ekstraklasa side Raków Częstochowa on a three-and-a-half-year deal with an option for another year, for a reported fee of approx. €750,000.

On 8 September 2025, Rocha joined Zagłębie Lubin on a season-long loan with an option to buy. He scored seven goals in thirteen appearances across all competitions, before being recalled by Raków on 16 December.

On 4 July 2026, Rocha transferred to Japanese club JEF United Chiba for a reported fee of €1.1 million.

== Career statistics ==
As of match played 23 May 2026

Appearances and goals by club, season and competition
| Club | Season | League | | | National cup (Note: Includes Belgian Cup, Polish Cup) | | Other | | Total | |
| Club | Season | Division | Apps | Goals | Apps | Goals | Apps | Goals | Apps | Goals |
|---|---|---|---|---|---|---|---|---|---|---|
| Monaco B | 2016–17 | CFA | 1 | 0 | — | | — | | 1 | 0 |
| Vicenza | 2016–17 | Serie B | 0 | 0 | 0 | 0 | — | | 0 | 0 |
| Leganés B | 2017–18 | Tercera División | 10 | 3 | — | | — | | 10 | 3 |
| Ontinyent (loan) | 2017–18 | Segunda División B | 9 | 3 | — | | — | | 9 | 3 |
| Lommel | 2018–19 | Belgian First Division B | 26 | 16 | 1 | 2 | 6 (Note: Appearances in Belgian First Division B relegation play-offs) | 3 | 33 | 21 |
| Eupen | 2019–20 | Belgian First Division A | 6 | 0 | 1 | 0 | — | | 7 | 0 |
| Eupen | 2021–22 | Belgian First Division A | 13 | 0 | 2 | 0 | — | | 15 | 0 |
| Eupen | Total | | 19 | 0 | 3 | 0 | — | | 22 | 0 |
| RWDM47 (loan) | 2020–21 | Belgian First Division B | 13 | 7 | 2 | 3 | — | | 15 | 10 |
| Lierse | 2022–23 | Belgian First Division B | 17 | 12 | 2 | 0 | — | | 19 | 12 |
| Radomiak Radom | 2022–23 | Ekstraklasa | 13 | 6 | — | | — | | 13 | 6 |
| Radomiak Radom | 2023–24 | Ekstraklasa | 26 | 4 | 1 | 0 | — | | 27 | 4 |
| Radomiak Radom | 2024–25 | Ekstraklasa | 17 | 11 | 2 | 0 | — | | 19 | 11 |
| Radomiak Radom | Total | | 56 | 21 | 3 | 0 | — | | 59 | 21 |
| Raków Częstochowa | 2024–25 | Ekstraklasa | 14 | 1 | — | | — | | 14 | 1 |
| Raków Częstochowa | 2025–26 | Ekstraklasa | 18 | 2 | 3 | 0 | 7 (Note: Appearances in UEFA Conference League) | 0 | 28 | 2 |
| Raków Częstochowa | Total | | 32 | 3 | 3 | 0 | 7 | 0 | 42 | 3 |
| Zagłębie Lubin (loan) | 2025–26 | Ekstraklasa | 11 | 7 | 2 | 0 | — | | 13 | 7 |
| JEF United Chiba | 2026–27 | J1 League | 0 | 0 | 0 | 0 | 0 | 0 | 0 | 0 |
| Career total | | | 194 | 72 | 16 | 5 | 13 | 3 | 223 | 80 |

== Honours ==
Individual

- Belgian First Division B top goalscorer: 2018–19 (16 goals)
- Ekstraklasa Player of the Month: July 2024
