= Dráb =

Dráb (feminine: Drábová) is a Czech and Slovak surname. In feudal times, dráb denoted the occupation of a man who oversaw workers in the fields or executed corporal punishment. In a certain context, this word also referred to an (infantry) soldier. A diminutive form of the surname is Drábek. Notable people with the surname include:

- Dana Drábová (1961–2025), Czech physicist and politician
- Tomáš Dráb (born 1999), Slovak footballer
