= Jakub Michlík =

Slovak footballer

Personal information
- Full name: Jakub Michlík
- Date of birth: 9 October 1997 (age 29)
- Place of birth: Žilina, Slovakia
- Position: Midfielder

Team information
- Current team: Púchov
- Number: 10

Youth career
- Žilina

Senior career*
Years	Team	Apps	(Gls)
2014–2017	Žilina B	86	(19)
2015–2017	Žilina	15	(1)
2018	Olympia Radotín	6	(0)
2018–2021	Púchov	46	(10)
2021	Slavoj Trebišov	12	(1)
2022–	Púchov	59	(9)

International career^{‡}
	Slovakia U16	1	(0)
2014	Slovakia U17	3	(0)
2014	Slovakia U18	1	(0)
2016	Slovakia U19	2	(0)
- * Club domestic league appearances and goals as of 22 June 2024 ‡ National team caps and goals as of 17 July 2017

Jakub Michlík (born 9 October 1997) is a Slovak professional footballer who plays for Púchov as a midfielder.

== Club career ==
=== MŠK Žilina ===
He made his Fortuna Liga debut for Žilina against Ružomberok on 7 November 2015.
