= Jakub Buchel =

Slovak footballer

Personal information
- Full name: Jakub Buchel
- Date of birth: 16 September 2002 (age 24)
- Place of birth: Slovakia
- Height: 1.85 m (6 ft 1 in)
- Position: Midfielder

Team information
- Current team: Senica
- Number: 27

Youth career
- Senica

Senior career*
Years	Team	Apps	(Gls)
2020−	Senica	2	(0)
- * Club domestic league appearances and goals as of 12 January 2021

Jakub Buchel (born 16 September 2002) is a Slovak footballer who plays for FK Senica as a midfielder. He is the twin brother of FK Senica forward Filip Buchel.

== Club career ==
Jakub Buchel made his professional Fortuna Liga debut for FK Senica against AS Trenčín on 16 February 2020.
