= Filip Buchel =

Slovak footballer

Personal information
- Full name: Filip Buchel
- Date of birth: 16 September 2002 (age 24)
- Place of birth: Slovakia
- Height: 1.82 m (6 ft 0 in)
- Position: Forward

Team information
- Current team: Spartak Myjava
- Number: 12

Youth career
- Senica

Senior career*
Years	Team	Apps	(Gls)
2020−2022	Senica	17	(0)
2022−	Spartak Myjava	2	(0)
- * Club domestic league appearances and goals as of 8 August 2023

Filip Buchel (born 16 September 2002) is a Slovak footballer who plays for Spartak Myjava as a forward. He is the twin brother of Jakub Buchel, who also plays for Senica as a midfielder.

== Club career ==
=== FK Senica ===
Buchel made his Fortuna Liga debut for Senica against FC DAC 1904 Dunajská Streda on 16 February 2020.
