= Lukáš Csáno =

Slovak footballer

Personal information
- Full name: Lukáš Csáno
- Date of birth: 11 July 2001 (age 25)
- Place of birth: Slovakia
- Height: 1.88 m (6 ft 2 in)
- Position: Centre-forward

Team information
- Current team: FK Rača
- Number: 22

Youth career
- 2006–2011: SDM Domino
- 2011–2016: Ružinov Bratislava
- 2014–2015: → Inter Bratislava (loan)
- 2015–2016: → Spartak Trnava (loan)
- 2016–2020: Spartak Trnava

Senior career*
Years	Team	Apps	(Gls)
2020–2021	Liberec	2	(0)
2021–2022	Bardejov	18	(0)
2022–	Rača	19	(3)
- * Club domestic league appearances and goals as of 23 May 2023

Lukáš Csáno (born 11 July 2001) is a Slovak professional footballer who currently plays for FK Rača as a centre-forward.

== Club career ==
=== FC Slovan Liberec ===
Csáno made his professional Czech First League debut for FC Slovan Liberec against FK Pardubice on 27 September 2020.
