= Ličartovce =

- Municipality
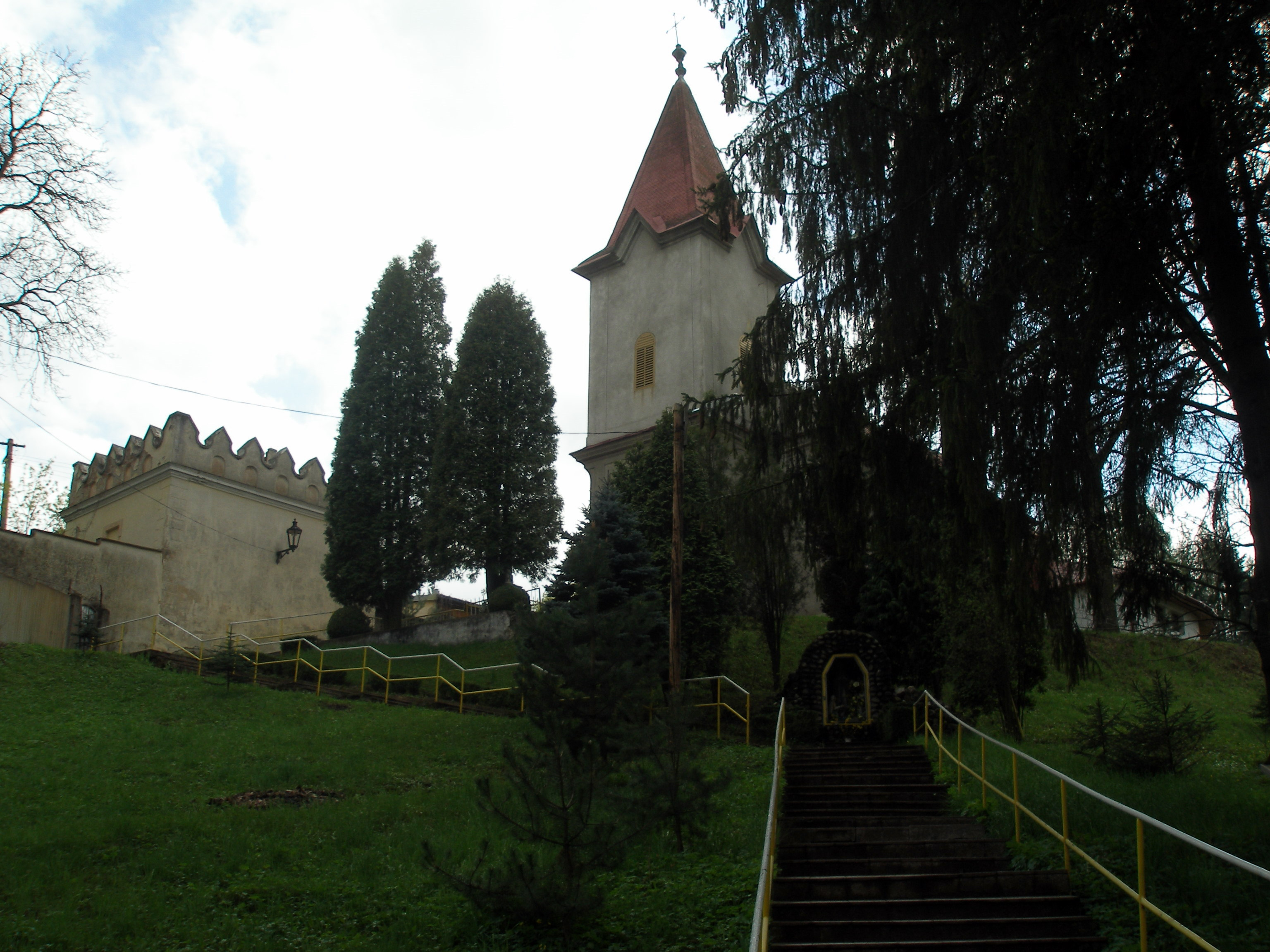
- Church of Saint Martin

- Flag

- Location of Ličartovce in the Prešov Region Location of Ličartovce in Slovakia
- Coordinates: 48.88°N 21.25°E
- Country: Slovakia
- Region: Prešov Region
- District: Prešov District
- First mentioned: 1249

Government
  - Mayor: Pavol Jurko

Area
  - Total: 8.28 km^{2} (3.20 sq mi)
- Elevation: 282 m (925 ft)

Population (2025)
  - Total: 967
- Time zone: UTC+1 (CET)
  - Summer (DST): UTC+2 (CEST)
- Postal code: 820 3
- Area code: +421 51
- Vehicle registration plate (until 2022): PO
- Website: www.licartovce.eu

Ličartovce is a village and municipality in Prešov District in the Prešov Region of eastern Slovakia.

== History ==
In historical records the village was first mentioned in 1249.

== Geography ==
The municipality lies at an altitude of 282 metres (925 ft) and covers an area of 8.28 km^{2} (3.20 sq mi) (2025).

== Population ==
Population statistic (10 years)
Year	1995	2005	2015	2025
Count	964	955	970	967
Difference		−0.93%	+1.57%	−0.30%

Population statistic
Year	2024	2025
Count	972	967
Difference		−0.51%

It has a population of 967 people (31 December 2025).

=== Ethnicity ===
Census 2021 (1+ %)
Ethnicity	Number	Fraction
Slovak	913	96.3%
Not found out	33	3.48%
Total	948	

In year 2021 was 948 people by ethnicity 913 as Slovak, 33 as Not found out, 4 as Romani, 3 as Rusyn, 2 as Czech, 2 as Russian and 1 as Croatian.

Note on population: The difference values of population numbers in the table "Population statistic" and in the sections "Ethnicity" & "Religion" is caused by the use of various statistical methods.

=== Religion ===
Census 2021 (1+ %)
Religion	Number	Fraction
Roman Catholic Church	758	79.96%
None	82	8.65%
Not found out	45	4.75%
Greek Catholic Church	38	4.01%
Evangelical Church	15	1.58%
Total	948	

In year 2021 was 948 people by religion 758 from Roman Catholic Church, 82 from None, 45 from Not found out, 38 from Greek Catholic Church, 15 from Evangelical Church, 4 from Eastern Orthodox Church, 2 from Christian Congregations in Slovakia, 1 from Calvinist Church, 1 from Paganism and natural spirituality, 1 from Other and 1 from Ad hoc movements.
