= Milan Sekera =

Slovak footballer

Personal information
- Full name: Milan Sekera
- Date of birth: 14 February 2002 (age 24)
- Place of birth: Slovakia
- Height: 1.86 m (6 ft 1 in)
- Position: Right back

Team information
- Current team: Dynamo Malženice
- Number: 2

Youth career
- Lokomotíva Trnava
- 2014–2020: Spartak Trnava

Senior career*
Years	Team	Apps	(Gls)
2020−2021	Spartak Trnava	3	(0)
2021-2022	FC Slovan Galanta	?	(?)
2022-2025	FK Rača	15	(1)
2025–	Dynamo Malženice	8	(0)
- * Club domestic league appearances and goals as of 16:00, 15 April 2026 (UTC)

Milan Sekera (born 14 February 2002) is a Slovak footballer who plays for 2. Liga club OFK Dynamo Malženice as a right back.

== Club career ==
When Sekera was 15 years old he went on trial at Juventus FC.

Sekera made his professional Fortuna Liga debut for Spartak Trnava against MŠK Žilina on 14 June 2020. He came on as a substitute in the 81st minute, but was not able to make an impact in a 2–1 loss.

Altogether he made 3 appearances for Spartak before joining FC Slovan Galanta.

In 2025, Sekera joined 2. Liga club OFK Dynamo Malženice. He made his debut in a 2–1 win against OFK Baník Lehota pod Vtáčnikom, starting the match and playing until the 54th minute.
