= C-Confion =

Ghanaian actor and comedian (1998–2024)

Bright Owusu
- Born: December 2, 1998
- Died: December 20, 2024 (aged 26)
- Other names: C-Confion
- Occupations: Actor, Comedian
- Years active: 2020–2024
- Known for: Kumasi-based skit comedy

Bright Owusu (2 December 1998 – 20 December 2024), commonly known by the stage name C-Confion, was a Ghanaian actor and comedian. He was one of the Kumasi-based skit makers introduced to the film industry.

Owusu died on 20 December 2024, at the age of 26.
