= Patrik Prikryl =

Slovak football defender

Personal information
- Full name: Patrik Prikryl
- Date of birth: 19 September 1992 (age 34)
- Place of birth: Banská Bystrica, Czechoslovakia
- Height: 1.86 m (6 ft 1 in)
- Position: Defender

Team information
- Current team: Zvolen
- Number: 9

Youth career
- —2008: Dukla Banská Bystrica
- 2008—2012: ŠK Badín

Senior career*
Years	Team	Apps	(Gls)
–2014	ŠK Badín		
2014–2015	Jupie Podlavice	13	(5)
2015	→ Pohronie (loan)	14	(0)
2016–2018	Pohronie	75	(1)
2018	→ Tatran Prešov (loan)	11	(0)
2018–2022	Dukla Banská Bystrica	102	(15)
2023	Pohronie	25	(1)
2024	Zvolen	14	(0)
2024-	FK Podkonice	-	(-)
- * Club domestic league appearances and goals as of 2 January 2025

Patrik Prikryl (born 19 September 1992) is a Slovak professional footballer who currently plays for Zvolen.

== Club career ==
=== 1. FC Tatran Prešov ===
Prikryl made his professional Fortuna Liga debut for Tatran Prešov against Železiarne Podbrezová on 18 February 2018.

=== Banska Bystrica ===
On 8 June 2019, he score a double over MFK Ružomberok B for Dukla Banská Bystrica. He played in a 4:1 loss against MŠK Žilina in 2022. He only played 4 games in the top flight for Bystrica before leaving for 2nd Division side FK Pohronie.
