= Marko Milunović =

Serbian footballer

Personal information
- Full name: Marko Milunović
- Date of birth: 10 September 1986 (age 40)
- Place of birth: Belgrade, SFR Yugoslavia
- Height: 1.83 m (6 ft 0 in)
- Position: Forward

Senior career*
Years	Team	Apps	(Gls)
–2011	Hajduk Beograd		
2012	BSK Borča	4	(0)
2012–2013	Kolubara	16	(2)
2012–2013	Mladenovac	10	(0)
2013	Tatran Liptovský Mikuláš	11	(4)
2014	Frýdek-Místek	9	(1)
2015–2016	Partizán Bardejov	42	(25)
2016–2017	Skalica	26	(4)
2017	Sereď	13	(4)
2018	Stal Rzeszów	6	(1)
2018–2019	Partizán Bardejov	44	(8)
2020–2021	Humenné	15	(2)
2022–2024	Tatran Prešov	49	(2)
- * Club domestic league appearances and goals as of 22 June 2024

Marko Milunović (born 10 September 1986) is a Serbian retired footballer who played as a forward.
