= Yevhen Nemtinov =

Ukrainian footballer

Personal information
- Full name: Yevhen Serhiyovych Nemtinov
- Date of birth: 3 October 1995 (age 31)
- Place of birth: Chernivtsi, Ukraine
- Height: 1.81 m (5 ft 11 1/2 in)
- Position: Midfielder

Youth career
- 2008–2009: FC Monolit Illichivsk
- 2011–2012: Bukovyna Chernivtsi

Senior career*
Years	Team	Apps	(Gls)
2012–2013	Nistru Otaci	2	(0)
2013–2014	Bukovyna Chernivtsi	31	(1)
2013	Bukovyna-2 LS Luzhany (amateur)	4	(0)
2015	Illichivets Mariupol	6	(0)
2015–2016	Dynamo Kyiv	0	(0)
2015–2016	→ Dynamo-2 Kyiv	10	(1)
2016	Bukovyna Chernivtsi	18	(2)
2017	Inhulets Petrove	11	(1)
2017	→ Inhulets-2 Petrove	2	(2)
2017–2018	Bukovyna Chernivtsi	21	(6)
2018–2020	Polissya Zhytomyr	27	(5)
2020–2021	Ahrobiznes Volochysk	12	(1)
2021–2022	Epitsentr Dunaivtsi	18	(7)
2022	→ MKS Kluczbork (loan)	10	(0)
2022–2023	Tatran Prešov	34	(3)
2024	JKS Jarosław	8	(5)
2024–2025	Pogoń-Sokół Lubaczów	5	(1)

International career
2015	Ukraine U20	7	(0)
- * Club domestic league appearances and goals as of 12:43, 9 June 2025 (UTC)

Yevhen Nemtinov (Ukrainian: Євген Сергійович Немтінов; born 3 October 1995) is a Ukrainian professional footballer who plays as a midfielder.

== Career ==
Nemtinov is a product of the Youth Sportive Schools in Illichivsk and Chernivtsi. He started his senior career with Nistru Otaci and Bukovyna Chernivtsi, before moving to Illichivets Mariupol in January 2015.

He made his Ukrainian Premier League debut for Illichivets in a match against Chornomorets Odesa on 27 February 2015.
