= Martin Baran =

Slovak footballer

Personal information
- Full name: Martin Baran
- Date of birth: 3 January 1988 (age 38)
- Place of birth: Prešov, Czechoslovakia
- Height: 1.86 m (6 ft 1 in)
- Positions: Centre-back; defensive midfielder

Team information
- Current team: FK Slovan Kendice

Youth career
- Tatran Prešov

Senior career*
Years	Team	Apps	(Gls)
2006–2009	Tatran Prešov	27	(0)
2008	→ Lučenec (loan)	11	(0)
2009–2010	Kasımpaşa	6	(0)
2010–2011	Tatran Prešov	21	(0)
2012	Polonia Bytom	29	(2)
2013	Polonia Warsaw	12	(0)
2013–2016	Jagiellonia Białystok	47	(2)
2016	→ Wigry Suwałki (loan)	13	(1)
2016	Podbeskidzie Bielsko-Biała	5	(0)
2017–2018	Odra Opole	15	(1)
2018	Podbrezová	14	(0)
2019	Podhale Nowy Targ	16	(1)
2019–2022	Znicz Pruszków	85	(3)
2022–2024	Tatran Prešov	55	(4)
2024–	FK Slovan Kendice		

International career
2006–2007	Slovakia U19	16	(1)
2009–2010	Slovakia U21	10	(0)
- * Club domestic league appearances and goals as of 4 January 2025

Martin Baran (born 3 January 1988) is a Slovak professional footballer who plays as a centre-back or defensive midfielder for FK Slovan Kendice.

== Career ==
Baran began his career with Tatran Prešov and played in 2008 eleven games on loan for LAFC Lučenec. On 29 June 2009, Baran has signed five-year contract for Kasımpaşa S.K.
