= Peter Kolesár =

Slovak footballer

Personal information
- Full name: Peter Kolesár
- Date of birth: 9 July 1998 (age 28)
- Place of birth: Trebišov, Slovakia
- Height: 1.70 m (5 ft 7 in)
- Positions: Attacking midfielder; winger

Team information
- Current team: Stará Ľubovňa
- Number: 7

Youth career
- 2005–2013: Trebišov
- 2013–2016: Michalovce

Senior career*
Years	Team	Apps	(Gls)
2017–2020	Michalovce	65	(9)
2020–2023	Spartak Trnava	19	(0)
2021–2022	→ Zlaté Moravce (loan)	25	(0)
2022–2023	→ Slavoj Trebišov (loan)	28	(4)
2023–2024	Chojniczanka Chojnice	28	(1)
2024–2025	Sandecja Nowy Sącz	13	(1)
2025–	Stará Ľubovňa	17	(3)

International career
2015	Slovakia U17	3	(0)
2017	Slovakia U19	1	(0)
2018	Slovakia U20	1	(0)
2019	Slovakia U21	8	(2)
- * Club domestic league appearances and goals as of 18 January 2026

Peter Kolesár (born 9 July 1998) is a Slovak professional footballer who plays as an attacking midfielder or a winger for 2. Liga club Redfox FC Stará Ľubovňa.

== Club career ==
=== Zemplín Michalovce ===
Kolesár made his professional Fortuna Liga debut for Zemplín Michalovce on 21 February 2017 against Spartak Trnava.

Despite being a crucial player of the team during the 2019–20 season, Kolesár did not continue after the Fortuna Liga had resumed following the coronavirus pandemic, seeking new challenges and not agreeing with Zemplín Michalovce on a contract extension.

== Honours ==
Sandecja Nowy Sącz

- III liga, group IV: 2024–25
