= Miroslav Petko =

Slovak footballer

Personal information
- Full name: Miroslav Petko
- Date of birth: 24 March 1995 (age 31)
- Place of birth: Prešov, Slovakia
- Position: Right back

Team information
- Current team: Tatran Prešov
- Number: 3

Youth career
- –2014: Prešov

Senior career*
| Years | Team | Apps | (Gls) |
| 2014–2018 | Prešov | 91 | (1) |
| 2019 | Lokomotíva Košice | 11 | (0) |
| 2019–2022 | Partizán Bardejov | 53 | (0) |
| 2022– | Prešov | 54 | (2) |
- * Club domestic league appearances and goals as of 22 June 2024

Miroslav Petko (born 24 March 1995) is a Slovak professional footballer who plays as a defender for 1. FC Tatran Prešov.

== Club career ==
=== 1. FC Tatran Prešov ===
Petko made his debut for 1. FC Tatran Prešov against FK Bodva Moldava nad Bodvou on 3 October 2014.
