= Benjamín Száraz =

Slovak footballer

Personal information
- Date of birth: 9 March 1998 (age 28)
- Place of birth: Veľký Kýr, Slovakia
- Height: 1.89 m (6 ft 2 in)
- Position: Goalkeeper

Team information
- Current team: Spartak Trnava
- Number: 1

Youth career
- FC Veľký Kýr
- 2011: ŠK Šurany
- 2012–2015: Senica

Senior career*
| Years | Team | Apps | (Gls) |
| 2015–2016 | Senica | 0 | (0) |
| 2017–2022 | DAC Dunajská Streda | 5 | (0) |
| 2019 | → Gabčíkovo (loan) | 10 | (0) |
| 2021–2022 | → Zemplín Michalovce (loan) | 18 | (0) |
| 2022–2024 | Zemplín Michalovce | 37 | (0) |
| 2024 | → Slavoj Trebišov (loan) | 3 | (0) |
| 2024 | DAC Dunajská Streda | 0 | (0) |
| 2025–2026 | Komárno | 16 | (0) |
| 2026– | Spartak Trnava | 0 | (0) |

International career
| 2015 | Slovakia U17 | 2 | (0) |
| 2016 | Slovakia U19 | 2 | (0) |
- * Club domestic league appearances and goals as of 21 November 2026

Benjamín Száraz (born 9 March 1998) is a Slovak footballer who plays as a goalkeeper for Spartak Trnava.

== Career ==
=== DAC 1904 Dunajská Streda ===
Száraz made his Fortuna Liga debut for DAC against Ružomberok on 27 May 2017.

In February 2019, Száraz was loaned out to Gabčíkovo.

On 6 September 2024, Száraz returned to DAC and signed a contract until the end of 2024, with an option for an additional half-year.
