= Mateus Oliveira (footballer, born 1994) =

Brazilian footballer

Mateus
Personal information
- Full name: Mateus de Oliveira Silva
- Date of birth: 27 September 1994 (age 32)
- Place of birth: São Paulo, Brazil
- Height: 1.75 m (5 ft 9 in)
- Position: Defensive midfielder

Team information
- Current team: Snina

Youth career
- Olé Brasil
- Grêmio

Senior career*
Years	Team	Apps	(Gls)
2015–2017	São Bernardo Futebol Clube		
2016–2017	→ ViOn Zlaté Moravce (loan)	15	(1)
2017–2018	ViOn Zlaté Moravce	17	(0)
2018–2020	San Fernando de Henares	23	(3)
2021–2022	Družstevník Veľké Ludince	9	(1)
2022	→ Orion Tip Sereď (loan)	7	(1)
2022	Pohronie	11	(1)
2023	Humenné	11	(2)
2023–	Snina	11	(0)
- * Club domestic league appearances and goals as of 19:32, 4 February 2024 (UTC)

Mateus de Oliveira Silva (born 27 September 1994) is a Brazilian professional footballer who plays as a defensive midfielder for Snina.

== Career ==
Mateus made his professional Fortuna Liga debut for ViOn Zlaté Moravce against Senica on 19 November 2016. He also netted his first goal for Zlaté Moravce in the match against Senica.
