= Dominik Sokół =

Polish footballer (born 1999)

Personal information
- Full name: Dominik Piotr Sokół
- Date of birth: 16 May 1999 (age 27)
- Place of birth: Iłża, Poland
- Height: 1.85 m (6 ft 1 in)
- Positions: Forward; right winger

Team information
- Current team: ŁKS Łódź

Youth career
- Radomiak Radom
- 2007–2012: Legion Radom
- 2012–2016: Broń Radom

Senior career*
| Years | Team | Apps | (Gls) |
| 2016–2017 | Broń Radom | 2 | (0) |
| 2017 | LKS Promna | 16 | (11) |
| 2017–2024 | Radomiak Radom | 88 | (6) |
| 2019 | → Elana Toruń (loan) | 12 | (4) |
| 2020 | → GKS Jastrzębie (loan) | 5 | (0) |
| 2023 | → Tatran Prešov (loan) | 14 | (3) |
| 2023 | → Tatran Prešov (loan) | 15 | (3) |
| 2024 | Zagłębie Sosnowiec | 14 | (0) |
| 2024–2026 | Znicz Pruszków | 63 | (9) |
| 2026– | ŁKS Łódź | 0 | (0) |

International career
| 2019 | Poland U20 | 1 | (0) |
- * Club domestic league appearances and goals as of 16:23, 26 May 2026 (UTC)

Dominik Piotr Sokół (born 16 May 1999) is a Polish professional footballer who plays as a forward for I liga club ŁKS Łódź.

== Honours ==
Radomiak Radom

- I liga: 2020–21
- II liga: 2018–19
