= Tiago Matos =

Portuguese footballer

Personal information
- Full name: Tiago Manuel Maio Matos
- Date of birth: 22 January 2001 (age 25)
- Place of birth: Porto, Portugal
- Height: 1.78 m (5 ft 10 in)
- Positions: Right-back; defensive midfielder

Team information
- Current team: Lokomotiv Gorna Oryahovitsa
- Number: 8

Youth career
- 2010–2020: Porto

Senior career*
Years	Team	Apps	(Gls)
2018–2021	Porto B	26	(0)
2021–2024	Radomiak	25	(1)
2023	→ Tatran Prešov (loan)	15	(1)
2024–2025	Torreense	8	(0)
2025–2026	Marco 09	15	(0)
2026–	Lokomotiv Gorna Oryahovitsa	1	(1)

International career
2016	Portugal U15	2	(0)
2016–2017	Portugal U16	9	(0)
2017–2018	Portugal U17	11	(0)
2018–2019	Portugal U18	7	(0)
2019–2020	Portugal U19	2	(0)
- * Club domestic league appearances and goals as of 7 May 2026

Tiago Manuel Maio Matos (born 22 January 2001) is a Portuguese professional footballer who plays as a right-back or defensive midfielder for Second Professional Football League (Bulgaria) club Lokomotiv Gorna Oryahovitsa.

== Honours ==
Porto Youth

- UEFA Youth League: 2018–19
