= Ján Mizerák =

Slovak footballer

Personal information
- Full name: Ján Mizerák
- Date of birth: 24 August 1993 (age 33)
- Place of birth: Prešov, Slovakia
- Height: 1.76 m (5 ft 9 in)
- Position: Left back

Team information
- Current team: ASV Hohenau

Youth career
- Tatran Prešov

Senior career*
Years	Team	Apps	(Gls)
2012−2013	→ Liptovský Mikuláš (loan)		
2013−2016	Liptovský Mikuláš	66	(0)
2016−2018	Skalica	62	(1)
2018−2019	Vlašim	21	(1)
2018−2020	Podbrezová	16	(0)
2020	→ Skalica (loan)	4	(0)
2020–2022	Skalica	43	(4)
2022−2024	FC Košice	39	(2)
2024−	ASV Hohenau	0	(0)
- * Club domestic league appearances and goals as of 21 July 2024

Ján Mizerák (born 24 August 1993) is a Slovak footballer who plays for ASV Hohenau as a left back.

== Club career ==
=== FC Košice ===
Mizerák made his professional Niké Liga debut for FC Košice against ŠK Slovan Bratislava on 29 July 2023, in a home fixture at Košická futbalová aréna.
