= Tomáš Dráb =

Slovak footballer

Personal information
- Date of birth: 1 June 1999 (age 27)
- Place of birth: Michalovce, Slovakia
- Height: 1.96 m (6 ft 5 in)
- Position: Goalkeeper

Team information
- Current team: Vranov

Youth career
- 2009–2017: Zemplín Michalovce

Senior career*
Years	Team	Apps	(Gls)
2017–2023	Zemplín Michalovce	7	(0)
2021–2022	→ Slavoj Trebišov (loan)	11	(0)
2022–2023	→ Vranov (loan)		
2023–2024	ŠK Nacina Ves		
2024–	Vranov		
- * Club domestic league appearances and goals as of 10:42, 15 June 2022 (UTC)

Tomáš Dráb (born 1 June 1999) is a Slovak professional footballer who plays for Vranov as a goalkeeper.

== Club career ==
=== MFK Zemplín Michalovce ===
Dráb made his Fortuna Liga debut for Zemplín Michalovce against Ružomberok on 21 June 2020. He was featured for the entirety of the match.
