= Lukáš Šimko =

Slovak footballer (born 1999)

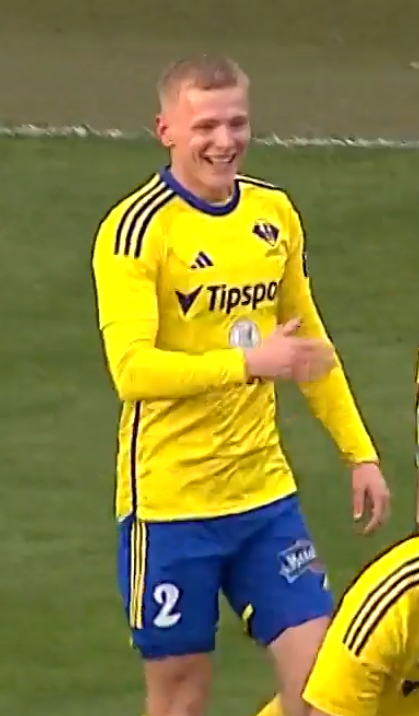
- Šimko in 2024 with Zemplín

Personal information
- Full name: Lukáš Šimko
- Date of birth: 29 June 1999 (age 27)
- Place of birth: Slovakia
- Height: 1.78 m (5 ft 10 in)
- Position: Right back

Team information
- Current team: MFK Skalica
- Number: 8

Youth career
- ?–2018: Tatran Prešov

Senior career*
Years	Team	Apps	(Gls)
2020–2023	Tatran Prešov	49	(1)
2020–2021	→ Slavoj Trebišov (loan)	45	(1)
2023–2025	Zemplín Michalovce	47	(1)
2025–	MFK Skalica	31	(3)
- * Club domestic league appearances and goals as of 21 September 2026

Lukáš Šimko (born 29 June 1999) is a Slovak professional footballer who currently plays for Slovak First League club MFK Skalica, as a right back.

== Club career ==
=== Early career ===
As a student, Šimko moved to the nearby club Tatran Prešov. In the fall of 2020, he headed to the second-league Slavoj Trebišov on loan and returned after two seasons. In Prešov, he was a solid part of Tatran's defense in the 2022-23 season, which narrowly missed promotion to the top league.

=== Zemplín Michalovce ===
On 8 July 2023, it was announced that Šimko would be leaving Tatran Prešov for first division side MFK Zemplín Michalovce, signing a 2 year contract. He made his debut for the club in a 2:0 loss in the league against AS Trenčín, coming on as a substitute in the 86” minute for Daniel Magda. In the following game, Šimko played the full 90” minutes in a 3:0 loss against Dukla Banská Bystrica. He scored his first goal for Zemplín in a 2:0 win against ViOn Zlaté Moravce on 9 March 2024, ending the clubs 17 games without a win.

His contract in Michalovce ran until the end of the year 2025, but the club eventually allowed him to look for a new club.

=== MFK Skalica ===
On 24 June 2025, it was announced that Šimko would be leaving Zemplín for MFK Skalica, signing a 2 year contract. He made his debut for Skalica in a 0–0 draw against MŠK Žilina on 27 July 2025, playing the full match. His first goal contribution would come in a 2–2 draw against 1. FC Tatran Prešov, assisting the second goal for Skalica scored by Marek Fábry.
