= Kamil Karaš =

Slovak footballer

Personal information
- Full name: Kamil Karaš
- Date of birth: 1 March 1991 (age 35)
- Place of birth: Stará Ľubovňa, Czechoslovakia
- Height: 1.80 m (5 ft 11 in)
- Position: Attacking midfielder

Team information
- Current team: Stará Ľubovňa
- Number: 29

Youth career
- Junošport Stará Ľubovňa
- MFK Košice

Senior career*
Years	Team	Apps	(Gls)
2009–2013	MFK Košice	80	(3)
2013–2014	Sigma Olomouc	11	(2)
2014	ŽP Šport Podbrezová	9	(0)
2015	ViOn Zlaté Moravce	13	(2)
2015–2016	VSS Košice	29	(10)
2016–2018	Lokomotíva Košice	65	(26)
2019–2022	FC Košice	42	(5)
2021–2022	→ Tatran Prešov (loan)		
2022–2023	Tatran Prešov	30	(2)
2023–	Stará Ľubovňa		

International career^{‡}
2009–2010	Slovakia U19	5	(0)
2010–2012	Slovakia U21	6	(0)
- * Club domestic league appearances and goals as of 30 June 2024 ‡ National team caps and goals as of 9 December 2012

Kamil Karaš (born 1 March 1991) is a Slovak football midfielder who plays for Redfox FC Stará Ľubovňa.

== Career statistics ==
As of 4 December 2011

Club performance			League		Cup		Continental		Total	
Season	Club	League	Apps	Goals	Apps	Goals	Apps	Goals	Apps	Goals
Slovakia				League		Slovak Cup		Europe		Total
2009–10	MFK Košice	Corgoň Liga	12	0	4	0	3	0	19	0
2010–11	MFK Košice	Corgoň Liga	17	1	0	0	0	0	17	1
2011–12	MFK Košice	Corgoň Liga	13	0	2	1	0	0	15	1
2018-19	MFK Košice	3. Liga	11	3	0	0	0	0	11	3
Career total			53	4	6	1	3	0	62	5
