= Richard Nagy (footballer, born 2000) =

Slovak footballer (born 2000)

Personal information
- Full name: Richard Nagy
- Date of birth: 10 August 2000 (age 26)
- Place of birth: Bratislava, Slovakia
- Height: 1.89 m (6 ft 2 in)
- Position: Centre-back

Team information
- Current team: Inter Bratislava

Youth career
- 2008–2009: Inter Bratislava
- 2009–2018: Slovan Bratislava
- 2015: → FKM Karlova Ves Bratislava (loan)
- 2018–2019: Žilina

Senior career*
Years	Team	Apps	(Gls)
2019–2021	Žilina B	35	(0)
2021–2023	Žilina	0	(0)
2022	→ Liptovský Mikuláš (loan)	9	(1)
2023	→ Tatran Prešov (loan)	12	(0)
2023	Zlaté Moravce	25	(1)
2024	Jedinstvo Ub	1	(0)
2024–2025	Tatran Prešov	20	(1)
2025–2026	Podbeskidzie	8	(0)
2026–	Inter Bratislava	0	(0)
- * Club domestic league appearances and goals as of 14:41, 6 June 2026 (UTC)

Richard Nagy (born 10 August 2000) is a Slovak professional footballer who plays as a defender for 2. Liga club Inter Bratislava.

== Club career ==
=== Tatran Liptovský Mikuláš ===
Nagy made his Fortuna Liga debut for Liptovský Mikuláš against Zlaté Moravce on 12 February 2022.
