= Antonis Gaitanidis =

Greek footballer

Personal information
- Full name: Antonios Gaitanidis
- Date of birth: 18 March 2000 (age 26)
- Place of birth: Ioannina, Greece
- Height: 1.75 m (5 ft 9 in)
- Position: Winger

Team information
- Current team: Iraklis Gerolakkou
- Number: 24

Youth career
- 2014–2018: PAOK

Senior career*
Years	Team	Apps	(Gls)
2018–2021	PAOK	0	(0)
2020	→ Apollon Smyrnis (loan)	1	(0)
2020–2021	→ Levadiakos (loan)	1	(0)
2021–2022	PAOK B	15	(0)
2022	Tatran Prešov	13	(1)
2023–2024	Oskarshamns AIK	25	(4)
2024	Panachaiki	14	(2)
2024–2025	Giouchtas		
2025	Ethnikos Neo Keramidi	10	(0)
2025–2026	Anagennisi Arta		
2026–	Iraklis Gerolakkou	2	(0)

International career^{‡}
2016	Greece U16	4	(1)
2016–2018	Greece U17	10	(1)
2018–2019	Greece U19	6	(4)
2019	Greece U21	2	(0)
- * Club domestic league appearances and goals as of 18 September 2026 ‡ National team caps and goals as of 25 April 2019

Antonis Gaitanidis (Greek: Αντώνης Γαϊτανίδης; born 18 March 2000) is a Greek professional footballer who plays as a forward for Cypriot Second Division club Iraklis Gerolakkou.

== Career ==
=== Early career ===
Antonis Gaitanidis came from Ioannina to PAOK in 2014 and then settled in the PAOK Academy House. In his first year at the club he was crowned champion with the Under-15s with 13 goals and five assists in 18 games. In his second season he was crowned a champion with the Under-17s with four goals and three assists. He won two championships with the Under-19s posting excellent stats in the 2018–19 season, when he scored 18 goals and provided an equal number of assists. He is of course a youth international. He is a left winger, but can also operate on the right wing. With pace and capable of beating players one-on-one, he is a player who also knows how to assist and to score. He trained with the first team in the pre-season of 2019, even scoring three goals in friendlies against Nordsjælland, Cluj and Anderlecht. In the process, he was loaned to Apollon Smyrnis and Levadiakos.
