= Jakub Čunta =

Slovak footballer

Personal information
- Full name: Jakub Čunta
- Date of birth: 28 August 1996 (age 30)
- Place of birth: Bratislava, Slovakia
- Height: 1.84 m (6 ft 0 in)
- Position: Left-back

Team information
- Current team: SK St. Johann
- Number: 20

Youth career
- –2015: Petržalka 1898
- 2014–2015: Senica

Senior career*
Years	Team	Apps	(Gls)
2015–2016	Senica	26	(0)
2016–2017	Cracovia	2	(0)
2018–2022	ŠTK Šamorín	63	(13)
2022–2023	Pohronie	22	(5)
2023	ŠTK Šamorín	16	(1)
2024	TSU Bramberg	14	(6)
2024–	SK St. Johann	3	(2)
- * Club domestic league appearances and goals as of 29 August 2024

Jakub Čunta (born 28 August 1996) is a Slovak professional footballer who plays as a left-back for Austrian club SK St. Johann.

== Club career ==
=== FK Senica ===
Čunta made his professional Fortuna Liga debut for Senica on 30 May 2015 against ŽP Šport Podbrezová.
