= FK Rača =

Slovak football club

- Full name: Futbalový klub Rača Bratislava
- Nickname: Loky
- Founded: 1925
- Ground: Štadión Rača, Rača, Bratislava
- Capacity: 4,200 (4,000 standees, 200 seats)
- Chairman: Branko Kovačič
- Head coach: Richard Stražan
- League: 3. liga
- 2025-26: 3. liga, 13th
- Website: www.fkraca.sk

FK Rača is a Slovak football team based in Rača, a borough of Bratislava. The club was founded in 1925. Club colors are blue and red-black. FK Rača home stadium is Štadión Rača on Černockého street with a capacity of 4,200 spectators, including 4,000 standees and 200 seats.

== Affiliated clubs ==
The following clubs were or are affiliated with FK Rača :

- (Slovakia) Slovan Ivanka pri Dunaji (2022–ongoing)

== Current squad ==
Updated 5 March 2023 Note: Flags indicate national team as defined under FIFA eligibility rules; some limited exceptions apply. Players may hold more than one non-FIFA nationality.

No.	Pos.	Nation	Player
1	GK	SVK	René Žákech
2	DF	SVK	Patrik Lörincz
3	DF	SVK	Martin Klabník
4	DF	NGA	Timi Atiki Egbe
5	MF	SVK	Marcel Plavnik
6	DF	SVK	Samuel Kňažek
7	FW	SVK	Alan Kováč
8	MF	SVK	Sven Jurčišin
9	FW	UKR	Ivan Hlushko
10	FW	SVK	Marek Výbošťok
11	MF	SVK	Dominik Adam (captain)
12	MF	CZE	Martin Petr

No.	Pos.	Nation	Player
13	MF	SVK	Matej Ružička
14	DF	SVK	Marek Sokol
15	MF	SVK	Michal Kobal
16	MF	SVK	Šimon Kováč
17	MF	SVK	Juraj Štefanka
18	MF	SVK	Richard Zošš
19	MF	SVK	Kristián Mihálek
20	GK	SVK	Samuel Knap
21	FW	SVK	Pavol Bellás
22	FW	SVK	Lukáš Csáno
23	MF	SVK	Matúš Bellay
—	DF	SVK	Milan Sekera

For recent transfers, see List of Slovak football transfers winter 2022–23

== Staff ==
=== Current technical staff ===
Staff	Job title
(Slovakia) Richard Stražan	Head coach
(Slovakia) Martin Kadlečík	Assistant coach
(Slovakia) Miroslav Holčík	Goalkeeper coach
(Slovakia) Boris Šimonič	Sport director
(Slovakia) Ľuboš Závodný	Technical director
(Slovakia) Alexandra Megóová	Physiotherapist

== Historical names ==
- ŠK Račištorf (1925–38)
- HG / HM Račištorf (1938–45)
- ŠK Račištorf (1945–52)
- TJ Sokol Rača (1953–55)
- TJ Lokomotíva Bratislava–Rača (1962–89)
- ŠK Rača (1990–1997)
- FK Rača (1997–present)
