= Maksym Kuchynskyi =

Ukrainian footballer

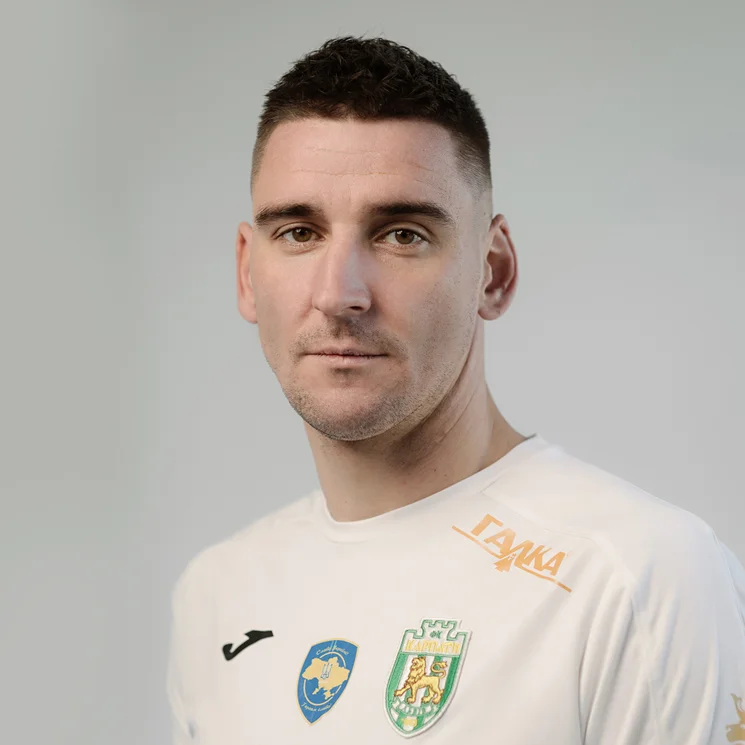

Personal information
- Full name: Maksym Vitaliyovych Kuchynskyi
- Date of birth: 28 June 1988 (age 38)
- Place of birth: Zaporizhzhia, Soviet Union (now Ukraine)
- Height: 1.90 m (6 ft 3 in)
- Position: Goalkeeper

Team information
- Current team: Tatran Prešov
- Number: 99

Youth career
- 2001–2005: Metalurh Zaporizhzhia

Senior career*
Years	Team	Apps	(Gls)
2005–2010	Metalurh Zaporizhzhia	0	(0)
2005–2007	→ Metalurh-2 Zaporizhzhia	30	(0)
2008	→ Zirka Kirovohrad (loan)	9	(0)
2009–2010	→ Metalurh-2 Zaporizhzhia	0	(0)
2011	Desna Chernihiv	7	(0)
2011–2015	Poltava	91	(1)
2015–2017	Cherkaskyi Dnipro	18	(0)
2017–2018	Poltava	17	(0)
2018–2019	Karpaty Lviv	22	(0)
2019	Dinamo Batumi	0	(0)
2020	Tukums	4	(0)
2021–2022	Karpaty Lviv	6	(0)
2022	Znojmo		
2022–2024	Tatran Prešov	56	(0)
2024-2025	Liptovský Mikuláš	20	(0)
2025-	Tatran Prešov	0	(0)

International career^{‡}
2007	Ukraine U19	3	(0)
- * Club domestic league appearances and goals as of 25 May 2026 ‡ National team caps and goals as of 25 July 2018

Maksym Vitaliyovych Kuchynskyi (Ukrainian: Максим Віталійович Кучинський; born 28 June 1988) is a Ukrainian professional footballer who plays as a goalkeeper for Tatran Prešov in the Slovak 2. Liga.

== Career ==
Kuchynskyi is a product of the Metalurh Zaporizhzhia Youth Sportive School System in his native Zaporizhzhia. He spent his career in the Ukrainian Second League and Ukrainian First League, but in summer 2018 signed a contract with the Ukrainian Premier League club Karpaty.

He made his debut for Karpaty Lviv in the Ukrainian Premier League in the match against Oleksandriya on 22 July 2018.

He was called up to the Ukraine national under-19 football team in March 2007, and spent 3 matches for this representation.

== Personal life ==
His father Vitaliy Kuchynskyi was an amateur football player.
