= Matej Moško =

Slovak footballer

Personal information
- Full name: Matej Moško
- Date of birth: 26 February 1999 (age 27)
- Place of birth: Púchov, Slovakia
- Height: 1.92 m (6 ft 4 in)
- Position: Centre-back

Team information
- Current team: Púchov
- Number: 4

Youth career
- –2014: Púchov
- 2014–2019: Žilina

Senior career*
Years	Team	Apps	(Gls)
2017–2021	Žilina B	37	(1)
2020–2021	→ ViOn Zlaté Moravce (loan)	24	(0)
2022–2022	→ Košice (loan)	6	(0)
2022–2023	Púchov	27	(1)
2023–2024	ViOn Zlaté Moravce	20	(0)
2024–	Púchov	36	(5)

International career
- Slovakia U16
- Slovakia U17
2017	Slovakia U18	1	(0)
2017–2018	Slovakia U19	4	(0)
- * Club domestic league appearances and goals as of 25 May 2026

Matej Moško (born 26 February 1999) is a professional Slovak footballer who plays for Púchov as a centre-back.

== Club career ==
=== FC ViOn Zlaté Moravce ===
Moško made his Fortuna Liga debut for ViOn Zlaté Moravce against Pohronie on 8 August 2020.
