= Alden Šuvalija =

Bosnian footballer

Personal information
- Full name: Alden Šuvalija
- Date of birth: 3 March 2002 (age 24)
- Place of birth: Sarajevo, Bosnia and Herzegovina
- Height: 1.95 m (6 ft 5 in)
- Position: Centre-back

Team information
- Current team: Michalovce

Youth career
- –2020: FK Sarajevo

Senior career*
Years	Team	Apps	(Gls)
2021	NK Novigrad		
2021–2022	Vitória de Guimarães U23		
2022–2023	Slovácko	0	(0)
2022–2023	→ Zlaté Moravce (loan)	23	(1)
2023–2024	Trenčín	0	(0)
2025–	Michalovce	0	(0)
2025	→ Zvolen (loan)	15	(0)

International career^{‡}
2018	Bosnia and Herzegovina U17	3	(0)
- * Club domestic league appearances and goals as of 17 May 2026 ‡ National team caps and goals as of 16 October 2018

Alden Šuvalija (born 3 March 2002) is a Bosnian professional footballer who currently plays for Michalovce as a centre-back.

== Club career ==
=== FC ViOn Zlaté Moravce ===
Šuvalija joined Slovak side during summer 2022 on a season-loan, from Czech club 1. FC Slovácko. He made his professional Fortuna Liga debut for ViOn Zlaté Moravce against DAC Dunajská Streda on 31 July 2022.
