= Vladimír Majdan =

Slovak football defender

Personal information
- Full name: Vladimír Majdan
- Date of birth: 7 April 1999 (age 27)
- Place of birth: Žilina, Slovakia
- Height: 1.81 m (5 ft 11 in)
- Position: Right back

Team information
- Current team: ViOn Zlaté Moravce
- Number: 2

Youth career
- 2009–2018: Žilina

Senior career*
Years	Team	Apps	(Gls)
2016–2022	Žilina B	52	(0)
2019	Žilina	6	(0)
2021	→ Senica	10	(0)
2022	→ Púchov (loan)	12	(0)
2022–2023	Košice	17	(0)
2023	→ Pohronie (loan)	11	(0)
2023–	ViOn Zlaté Moravce	25	(0)

International career^{‡}
2015–2016	Slovakia U17	7	(0)
2018	Slovakia U18	1	(0)
2016–2018	Slovakia U19	16	(0)
2018	Slovakia U20	1	(0)
2019	Slovakia U21	1	(0)
- * Club domestic league appearances and goals as of 28 June 2024 ‡ National team caps and goals as of 20:19, 23 January 2024 (UTC)

Vladimír Majdan (born 7 April 1999) is a professional Slovak footballer who plays as a defender for ViOn Zlaté Moravce.

== Club career ==
=== MŠK Žilina ===
Majdan made his Fortuna Liga debut for Žilina against Spartak Trnava on 16 February 2019. The game concluded in a 1–1 tie. He played 90 minutes of the match.

=== FC Košice ===
In June 2022, Majdan was signed to Košice by Anton Šoltis, who managed him during his loan spell in Senica.
