= Dávid Keresteš =

Slovak footballer

Personal information
- Date of birth: 4 September 1995 (age 31)
- Place of birth: Slovakia
- Height: 1.83 m (6 ft 0 in)
- Position: Midfielder

Team information
- Current team: Tatran Prešov
- Number: 21

Youth career
- Tatran Prešov

Senior career*
| Years | Team | Apps | (Gls) |
| 2014–2018 | Tatran Prešov | 108 | (0) |
| 2019–2020 | Partizán Bardejov | 22 | (0) |
| 2020–2021 | Košice | 14 | (2) |
| 2021–2022 | Partizán Bardejov | 28 | (2) |
| 2022– | Tatran Prešov | 39 | (0) |
- * Club domestic league appearances and goals as of 22 June 2024

Dávid Keresteš (born 4 September 1995) is a Slovak professional footballer who plays as a midfielder for 1. FC Tatran Prešov.

== Club career ==
Keresteš made his professional Fortuna Liga debut for Tatran Prešov against Ružomberok on 16 July 2016.
