= 2015–16 MFK Zemplín Michalovce season =

Michalovce
2015–16 season
- President: Igor Šoltinský
- Head coach: Stanislav Griga
- Stadium: Zemplin Stadium
- Fortuna Liga: 12th
- Slovak Cup: 4th round
- Top goalscorer: League: Vernon De Marco (5 goals); All: Stanislav Danko (6 goals)
- Highest home attendance: 4,575 (Michalovce – Slovan Bratislava)
- Lowest home attendance: 1,112 (Michalovce – Ružomberok)
- Average home league attendance: 3,239
Home colours	Away colours	Third colours

The 2015–16 season is MFK Zemplín Michalovce's first season in the Fortuna Liga after gaining promotion in the previous season in their 103rd year in existence.

== Transfers (Summer) ==
=== Transfers in ===
Note: Flags indicate national team as defined under FIFA eligibility rules; some limited exceptions apply. Players may hold more than one non-FIFA nationality.

No.	Pos.	Nation	Player
—	FW	NGR	Peter Nworah (from Free agent)
—	MF	SVK	Tomáš Sedlák (loan return from FK Poprad)
—	MF	GHA	Emmanuel Mensah (from FK Bodva Moldava nad Bodvou)
—	MF	SVK	Martin Bednár (from MFK Zemplín Michalovce youth)
—	GK	SVK	Marián Kelemen (from Free agent)
—	DF	GEO	Akaki Khubutia (from Free agent)
—	DF	ESP	Eric Barroso (from (Moldova) FC Tiraspol)
—	FW	CRO	Andrej Kerić (from (Luxembourg) F91 Dudelange)

=== Transfers out ===
Note: Flags indicate national team as defined under FIFA eligibility rules; some limited exceptions apply. Players may hold more than one non-FIFA nationality.

No.	Pos.	Nation	Player
—	FW	SVK	Tomáš Chovanec (loan return to MFK Dolný Kubín)
—	FW	SVK	Boris Bališ (loan return to FC Spartak Trnava)
—	FW	SVK	Erik Streňo (loan return to Partizán Bardejov)
—	MF	SVK	Lukáš Janič (to (Poland) Podbeskidzie Bielsko-Biała)
—	MF	SVK	Adrián Leško (on loan to FC Lokomotíva Košice)

For recent transfers, see List of Slovak football transfers summer 2015.

== Transfers (Winter) ==
In: Note: Flags indicate national team as defined under FIFA eligibility rules; some limited exceptions apply. Players may hold more than one non-FIFA nationality.

No.	Pos.	Nation	Player
—	GK	CZE	Patrik Macej (loan return from FC Lokomotíva Košice)
—	FW	SVK	Filip Serečin (from FC VSS Košice)
—	FW	RUS	Maxim Votinov (from (Russia) FC Luch-Energiya Vladivostok)
—	DF	BLR	Aleksandr Sverchinskiy (from (Belarus) FC Minsk)
—	MF	SRB	Nikola Lukić (from (Belarus) FC Minsk)
—	MF	GRE	Kyriakos Savvidis (on loan from (Greece) PAOK FC)
—	MF	GRE	Panagiotis Deligiannidis (on loan from (Greece) PAOK FC)

Out: Note: Flags indicate national team as defined under FIFA eligibility rules; some limited exceptions apply. Players may hold more than one non-FIFA nationality.

No.	Pos.	Nation	Player
—	DF	ESP	Antonio García Montero (End of contract (joined (Gibraltar) Europa FC))
—	FW	NGR	Peter Nworah (Released and joined (Czech Republic) FC Hradec Králové)
—	DF	ESP	Eric Barroso (Released and joined (Spain) Conil CF)
—	DF	ESP	Joan Caballero (Released and joined (Spain) CD Acero)
—	FW	GHA	Emmanuel Mensah (Released)

For recent transfers, see List of Slovak football transfers winter 2015–16.

== Current squad ==
As of 23 February 2016. Note: Flags indicate national team as defined under FIFA eligibility rules; some limited exceptions apply. Players may hold more than one non-FIFA nationality.

No.	Pos.	Nation	Player
1	GK	CZE	Martin Raška
2	DF	SVK	Milan Šimčák
4	MF	SVK	Lukáš Tóth
7	DF	ESP	Marcos Pérez (Captain)
8	MF	SVK	Jakub Grič
9	DF	SVK	Jakub Straka
10	MF	SVK	Martin Bednár
12	MF	SVK	Jozef-Šimon Turík
13	DF	GEO	Akaki Khubutia
14	FW	SVK	Martin Regáli
15	MF	SVK	Stanislav Danko
17	FW	SVK	Dominik Kunca
18	DF	ARG	Vernon De Marco
19	MF	ESP	Samuel Bayón

No.	Pos.	Nation	Player
20	DF	SVK	Oliver Podhorín
21	FW	SVK	Michal Hamuľak
22	GK	SVK	Matúš Kira
23	GK	SVK	Marián Kelemen
23	MF	SVK	Jozef Vajs
24	MF	SVK	Martin Koscelník
27	MF	SVK	Tomáš Sedlák
28	FW	SVK	Pavol Bellás
30	GK	CZE	Patrik Macej
44	DF	BLR	Aleksandr Sverchinskiy
77	MF	GRE	Panagiotis Deligiannidis
88	MF	GRE	Kyriakos Savvidis
89	FW	SVK	Filip Serečin
90	MF	SRB	Nikola Lukić
99	FW	RUS	Maxim Votinov

== Competitions ==
=== Pre-season friendlies ===
1 July 2015 Friendly	Michalovce (Slovakia)	6–1	(Slovakia) Lokomotíva Košice	Michalovce
18:00 CEST (UTC+02:00)	Danko 26'; Fabiani 45'; Turík 53'; Kavka 69' (o.g.); Musiol 82', 84'	Report	Serečin 45'	Stadium: Zemplin Stadium; Attendance: 600

4 July 2015 Friendly	KS Cracovia (Poland)	2–1	(Slovakia) Michalovce	Poprad, Slovakia
17:00 CEST (UTC+02:00)	Čovilo 26'; Wdowiak 54'	Report	Turík 84'	Stadium: NTC Poprad

7 July 2015 Friendly	Poprad (Slovakia)	2–1	(Slovakia) Michalovce	Poprad, Slovakia
17:00 CEST (UTC+02:00)	Rudiuk 2'; Durkot 12'	Report	Fabiani 80'	Stadium: NTC Poprad

8 July 2015 Friendly	Spišská Nová Ves (Slovakia)	1–2	(Slovakia) Michalovce	Poprad, Slovakia
17:00 CEST (UTC+02:00)	Štefánik 59'	Report	Kunca 14'; Nworah 31'	Stadium: NTC Poprad

11 July 2015 Friendly	Sandecja Nowy Sącz (Poland)	0–1	(Slovakia) Michalovce	Poprad, Slovakia
17:00 CEST (UTC+02:00)		Report	Kunca 25'	Stadium: NTC Poprad

16 January 2016 Friendly	Ferencváros (Hungary)	2–0	(Slovakia) Michalovce	Budapest, Hungary
	Nagy 54'; Kárász 66'	Report

23 January 2016 Friendly	Debreceni VSC (Hungary)	2–0	(Slovakia) Michalovce	Debrecen, Hungary
14:00 CEST (UTC+02:00)	Holman 35'; Horváth 47'	Report

23 January 2016 Friendly	Debreceni VSC (Hungary)	0–2	(Slovakia) Michalovce	Debrecen, Hungary
14:00 CEST (UTC+02:00)		Report	Hamuľak 55'; Votinov 57'

27 January 2016 Friendly	Michalovce (Slovakia)	2–0	(Slovakia) Trebišov	Michalovce
17:15 CEST (UTC+02:00)	Tóth 31'; Votinov 88'	Report

30 January 2016 Friendly	Michalovce (Slovakia)	2–0	(Slovakia) Prešov	Michalovce
13:00 CEST (UTC+02:00)	Koscelník 11', 21'	Report

3 February 2016 Friendly	Michalovce (Slovakia)	4–0	(Slovakia) Lokomotíva Košice	Michalovce
14:00 CEST (UTC+02:00)	Bellás 28'; Hamuľak 32'; Vajs 67'; Straka 86'	Report

6 February 2016 Friendly	KS Cracovia (Poland)	2–0	(Slovakia) Michalovce	Kraków, Poland
14:45 CEST (UTC+02:00)	Čovilo 7'; Dialiba 88'	Report		Stadium: Marshal Józef Piłsudski Stadium

11 February 2016 Friendly	Locomotive Tbilisi (Georgia (country))	1–2	(Slovakia) Michalovce	Alicante, Spain
15:00 CEST (UTC+02:00)	Benashvili 10' (pen.)	Report	Serečin 38' (pen.), 81'

13 February 2016 Friendly	Dacia Chișinău (Moldova)	2–3	(Slovakia) Michalovce	Alicante, Spain
12:00 CEST (UTC+02:00)	Zahynaylov 75'; Chemyrtan 87'	Report	Grič 38'; Sverchinskiy 70'; Kunca 72'

16 February 2016 Friendly	Valencia B (Spain)	0–1	(Slovakia) Michalovce	Alicante, Spain
12:00 CEST (UTC+02:00)		Report	Kunca 80'

20 February 2016 Friendly	Michalovce (Slovakia)	4–0	(Slovakia) VSS Košice	Michalovce
14:00 CEST (UTC+02:00)	Votinov 15', 39'; Tóth 52'; Bayón 81' (pen.)	Report

=== Fortuna Liga ===
==== League table ====
Pos	Team	Pld	W	D	L	GF	GA	GD	Pts	Qualification or relegation
8	Podbrezová	33	10	7	16	43	46	−3	37	
9	ViOn Zlaté Moravce	33	7	10	16	38	57	−19	31	
10	Senica	33	7	9	17	30	48	−18	30	
11	Zemplín Michalovce	33	7	8	18	32	55	−23	29	
12	Skalica (R)	33	6	6	21	30	62	−32	24	Relegation to 2. Liga

Source: Niké liga (in Slovak)
Rules for classification: 1) Points; 2) Head-to-head points; 3) Head-to-head goal difference; 4) Head-to-head away goals scored; 5) Play-off.
(R) Relegated

==== Matches ====
18 July 2015 1	Michalovce	0–1	Trenčín	Michalovce
19:00 CEST (UTC+02:00)		Report	Koolwijk 84'	Stadium: Zemplin Stadium; Attendance: 4,408; Referee: Boris Marhefka

25 July 2015 2	Skalica	1–0	Michalovce	Senica
19:00 CEST (UTC+02:00)	Gašparík 44'	Report		Stadium: Štadión FK Senica; Attendance: 1,016; Referee: Adam Somoláni

1 August 2015 3	Podbrezová	6–2	Michalovce	Brezno
17:00 CEST (UTC+02:00)	Melunović 12' (pen.); Mehanović 38', 90'; Vaščák 45'; Kupčík 63'; Gál-Andrezly 69'	Report	Vernon 26'; Hamuľak 71'	Stadium: Mestský štadión Brezno; Attendance: 2,450; Referee: Pavol Šuniar

8 August 2015 4	Michalovce	2–1	Zlaté Moravce	Michalovce
19:00 CEST (UTC+02:00)	Danko 26'; Regáli 66'	Report	Mance 45'; Školnik (yellow card) 25' (yellow-red card) 63'Milojević (yellow card) 85' (yellow-red card) 87'	Stadium: Zemplin Stadium; Attendance: 3,385; Referee: (Slovakia) Peter Královič

15 August 2015 5	Myjava	2–1	Michalovce	Myjava
19:00 CEST (UTC+02:00)	Piroska 45'; Daniel 77'	Report	Hamuľak (yellow card) 21' (yellow-red card) 72'; Šimčák 82'	Stadium: Stadium Myjava; Attendance: 1,560; Referee: (Slovakia) Michal Očenáš

22 August 2015 6	Michalovce	0–3	Dunajská Streda	Michalovce
19:00 CEST (UTC+02:00)		Report	Szarka 37'; Sarr 63'; Ľupták 75'	Stadium: Zemplin Stadium; Attendance: 4,225; Referee: (Slovakia) Jozef Pavlík

29 August 2015 7	Ružomberok	2–2	Michalovce	Ružomberok
19:00 CEST (UTC+02:00)	Jakubko 10'; Zošák 89' Rosa (yellow card) 20' (yellow-red card) 90'	Report	Regáli 50'; Koscelník 60'	Stadium: Štadión pod Čebraťom; Attendance: 2,531; Referee: (Slovakia) Július Straka

12 September 2015 8	Michalovce	1–3	Senica	Michalovce
19:00 CEST (UTC+02:00)	Hromada 20' (o.g.)	Report	Hromada 7', 30'; Dolný 65'	Stadium: Zemplin Stadium; Attendance: 3,055; Referee: (Slovakia) Ján Valášek

19 September 2015 9	Spartak Trnava	0–1	Michalovce	Trnava
18:20 CEST (UTC+02:00)		Report	Danko 26'	Stadium: Štadión Antona Malatinského; Attendance: 7,050; Referee: (Slovakia) Jozef Pavlík

23 September 2015 10	Michalovce	1–2	Slovan Bratislava	Michalovce
20:00 CEST (UTC+02:00)	Koscelník (yellow card) 32'; Marcos (yellow card) 37'; Vernon 88'	Report	González (yellow card) 7'; Saláta (yellow card) 29'; Milinković 34' (pen.); Štefánik (yellow card) 80'; Šimčák 90' (o.g.)	Stadium: Zemplin Stadium; Attendance: 4,575; Referee: (Slovakia) Mário Vlk

27 September 2015 11	Žilina	2–0	Michalovce	Žilina
14:00 CEST (UTC+02:00)	Mazáň (yellow card) 14'; Vavro (yellow card) 25'; Mihalík 30'; Bénes 70'	Report	Mensah (yellow card) 45'; Samuel Bayón (yellow card) 55'; Marcos (yellow card) 66'	Stadium: Štadión pod Dubňom; Attendance: 1,259; Referee: (Slovakia) Marek Mastiš

3 October 2015 12	AS Trenčín	2–0	Michalovce	Trenčín
18:20 CEST	Rabiu 31'; Bero 90+1'	Summary		Stadium: Štadión na Sihoti; Attendance: 2,315; Referee: (Slovakia) Boris Marhefka

18 October 2015 13	Michalovce	3–1	Skalica	Michalovce
14:00 CEST (UTC+02:00)	Bayón 16' (pen.); Danko 50', 53'	Report	Ulrich 14'	Stadium: Zemplin Stadium; Attendance: 2,135; Referee: Kamil Horváth

24 October 2015 14	Michalovce	2–0	Podbrezová	Michalovce
17:00 CEST (UTC+02:00)	Vernon 8', 40'	Report		Stadium: Zemplin Stadium; Attendance: 2,785; Referee: Vladimír Vnuk

31 October 2015 15	Zlaté Moravce	1–1	Michalovce	Zlaté Moravce
17:00 CET (UTC+01:00)	Marques de Souza 26'	Report	Kunca 53'	Stadium: Štadión FC ViOn; Attendance: 1,015; Referee: Michal Očenáš

7 November 2015 16	Michalovce	1–2	Myjava	Michalovce
17:00 CET (UTC+01:00)	Mensah 4'	Report	Sládek 86'; Daniel 88'	Stadium: Zemplin Stadium; Attendance: 1,821; Referee: Michal Smolák

20 November 2015 17	Dunajská Streda	3–1	Michalovce	Dunajská Streda
18:00 CET (UTC+01:00)	Pačinda 7' (pen.); Szarka 25', 55'	Report	Kunca 77'	Stadium: Mestský štadión Dunajská Streda; Attendance: 3,001; Referee: Adam Somoláni

28 November 2015 18	Michalovce	1–3	Ružomberok	Michalovce
17:00 CET (UTC+01:00)	Vernon 7'	Report	Boszorád 41'; Jakubko 50'; Faško 68'	Stadium: Zemplin Stadium; Attendance: 1,112; Referee: Martin Ježík

5 December 2015 19	Senica	1–1	Michalovce	Senica
17:00 CET (UTC+01:00)	Klec 37'	Report	Kunca 33'	Stadium: OMS ARENA Senica; Attendance: 1,012; Referee: Ladislav Prešinský

27 February 2016 20	Michalovce	0–1	Trnava	Michalovce
17:00 CET (UTC+01:00)	De Marco (yellow card) 13'	Report	Kadlec (yellow card) 11'; Schranz (yellow card) 44'; Depetris 57'; Čonka (yellow card) 80'	Stadium: Zemplin Stadium; Attendance: 4,135; Referee: Boris Marhefka

9 March 2016 21	Slovan Bratislava	1–0	Michalovce	Bratislava
16:00 CET (UTC+01:00)	de Kamps (yellow card) 79'; Priskin 90'	Report	Sverchinskiy (yellow card) 80'; Koscelník (yellow card) 89'; Calero (yellow card) 90'	Stadium: Štadión Pasienky; Attendance: 1,022; Referee: Peter Kralovic

4 March 2016 22	Žilina	2–3	Michalovce	Žilina
18:00 CET (UTC+01:00)	Bénes (yellow card) 11'; Paur 18'; Vavro 23' (yellow card) 83'; Mazáň (yellow card) 58'	Report	Koscelník 21' (yellow card) 89'; Khubutia (yellow card) 26'; Votinov (yellow card) 48'; Lukić 45', 60'	Stadium: Štadión pod Dubňom; Attendance: 1,079; Referee: Filip Glova

13 March 2016 23	Michalovce	1–3	Trenčín	Michalovce
14:30 CET (UTC+01:00)	Lukić 71' (pen.); Khubutia (yellow card) 84' (yellow-red card) 84'; De Marco (yellow card) 89'	Report	Bero 11' (yellow card) 66'; Maierhofer 62'; Kleščík (yellow card) 70'; Koolwijk (yellow card) 80'; Opatovský 90'	Stadium: Zemplin Stadium; Attendance: 3,765; Referee: Jozef Pavlik

20 March 2016 24	Skalica	0–0	Michalovce	Skalica
17:00 CET (UTC+01:00)	Štrombach (yellow card) 36'; Mazan (yellow card) 55'; Dobrotka (yellow card) 58'; Hlinka (yellow card) 81'; Záhumenský (yellow card) 88'	Report	Sverchinskiy (yellow card) 43'; Lukić (yellow card) 66'	Stadium: Mestský štadión Skalica; Attendance: 896; Referee: Vladimir Vnuk

2 April 2016 25	Podbrezová	2–0	Michalovce	Podbrezová
17:00 CEST (UTC+02:00)	Šafranko 13'; Viazanko (yellow card) 55'; Rendla 78'	Report	Bayón (yellow card) 58'; Calero (yellow card) 71' (yellow-red card) 71'; Hamuľak (yellow card) 76'	Stadium: ZELPO Aréna; Attendance: 1,325; Referee: Ivan Kruzliak

9 April 2016 26	Michalovce	1–1	Zlaté Moravce	Michalovce
17:00 CEST (UTC+02:00)	Hamuľak 40'; Sverchinskiy (yellow card) 43'; Podhorín (yellow card) 71'; Votinov (yellow card) 90'	Report	Kuzma (yellow card) 41'; Perišić (yellow card) 44'; Bamba 63'; Kováč (yellow card) 89'	Stadium: Zemplin Stadium; Attendance: 1,938; Referee: Michal Smolak

16 April 2016 27	Myjava	3–0	Michalovce	Myjava
19:00 CEST (UTC+02:00)	Daniel 18', 82' (yellow card) 62'; Beňo (yellow card) 60'; Škutka 82'; Machovec (yellow card) 90'	Report	Sverchinskiy (yellow card) 32'; Sedlák (yellow card) 90'	Stadium: Stadium Myjava; Attendance: 1,147; Referee: Kamil Horvath

19 April 2016 28	Michalovce	1–1	Dunajská Streda	Michalovce
19:00 CEST (UTC+02:00)	De Marco (yellow card) 33'; Hamuľak 45'	Report	Ľupták (yellow card) 44'; Pačinda (yellow card) 77'; Živković (yellow card) 83'; Černák 86'	Stadium: Zemplin Stadium; Attendance: 2,285; Referee: Kamil Horvath

23 April 2016 29	Ružomberok	0–0	Michalovce	Ružomberok
19:00 CEST (UTC+02:00)	Boszorád (yellow card) 35'; Lačný (yellow card) 83'; Faško (yellow card) 86'	Report	Calero (yellow card) 39'; Danko (yellow card) 68'; Bayón (yellow card) 90'	Stadium: Štadión pod Čebraťom; Attendance: 1,780; Referee: Michal Ocenas

30 April 2016 30	Michalovce	2–1	Senica	Michalovce
19:00 CEST (UTC+02:00)	Serečin 18'; Kunca 90'	Report	Krč (yellow card) 52'; Leško (yellow card) 55'; Hromada (yellow card) 60'; Mehremić (yellow card) 72'; Pavlík (yellow card) 80'; Almási 82'	Stadium: Zemplin Stadium; Attendance: 2,865; Referee: Jozef Pavlik

7 May 2016 31	Trnava	3–0	Michalovce	Trnava
19:00 CEST (UTC+02:00)	Schranz 22' (yellow card) 27'; Depetris 55', 59'	Report		Stadium: Anton Malatinský Stadium; Attendance: 4,750; Referee: Gabriel Michlian

13 May 2016 32	Michalovce	1–1	Slovan Bratislava	Michalovce
20:30 CEST (UTC+02:00)	Kunca (yellow card) 21' (goal) 36'; Sedlák (yellow card) 40'; Danko (yellow card) 57'; De Marco (yellow card) 79'	Report	Priskin 3'; de Kamps (yellow card) 11'	Stadium: Zemplin Stadium; Attendance: 4,125; Referee: Kamil Horvath

20 May 2016 33	Michalovce	3–0	Žilina	Michalovce
20:30 CEST (UTC+02:00)	Kunca 32', 80'; Koscelník 39'; De Marco (yellow card) 59'; Sverchinskiy (yellow card) 64'	Report	de Kamps (red card) 65'	Stadium: Zemplin Stadium; Attendance: 3,984; Referee: Jozef Pavlik

=== Slovnaft Cup ===
12 August 2015 2nd round	TJ Sokol Medzibrod	1–2	Michalovce	Medzibrod
17:00 CEST (UTC+02:00)	Bobok 59'	Report	Danko 3'; Regáli 32'; Joan Caballero (red card) 57'	Stadium: Futbalový štadion TJ Sokol Medzibrod; Attendance: 600; Referee: Boris Marhefka

1 September 2015 3rd round	Teplička nad Váhom	0–2	Michalovce	Varín
16:30 CEST (UTC+02:00)		Report	Danko 33'; Hamuľak 38'	Stadium: Areál Juraja Sabolu; Attendance: 350; Referee: Kamil Horváth

14 October 2015 4th round	Rohožník	1–1 (5–3 p)	Michalovce	Rohožník
15:00 CEST (UTC+02:00)	Marek Zajíc 7'; Marko Lörinczi (yellow card) 40'	Report	Hamuľak 59'; Joan Caballero (yellow card) 67'	Stadium: Štadión FC Rohožník; Attendance: 650; Referee: (Slovakia) Gabriel Michlian
