= List of Slovak football transfers summer 2020 =

Notable Slovak football transfers in the summer transfer window 2020 by club. Only transfers of the Fortuna Liga and 2. liga are included.

== Fortuna Liga ==
=== ŠK Slovan Bratislava ===
In: Note: Flags indicate national team as defined under FIFA eligibility rules; some limited exceptions apply. Players may hold more than one non-FIFA nationality.

No.	Pos.	Nation	Player
11	MF	CZE	Ondřej Petrák (from (Germany) 1. FC Nürnberg)
4	MF	BIH	Alen Mustafić (from (Bosnia and Herzegovina) FK Sarajevo)

Out: Note: Flags indicate national team as defined under FIFA eligibility rules; some limited exceptions apply. Players may hold more than one non-FIFA nationality.

No.	Pos.	Nation	Player
—	MF	CRO	Marin Ljubičić (End of contract)
—	MF	BIH	Alen Mustafić (on loan to (Slovakia) FC Nitra)
—	FW	SRB	Dejan Dražić (on loan to (Poland) Zagłębie Lubin)
—	FW	GRE	Georgios Tzovaras (Released)
—	DF	NED	Mitch Apau (Released)

=== MŠK Žilina ===
In: Note: Flags indicate national team as defined under FIFA eligibility rules; some limited exceptions apply. Players may hold more than one non-FIFA nationality.

No.	Pos.	Nation	Player
—	MF	SVK	Kristián Bari (from FC DAC 1904 Dunajská Streda)
—	MF	ARG	Iván Díaz (loan return from (Czech Republic) FC Viktoria Plzeň)
—	MF	SVK	Martin Kovaľ (loan return from FC ViOn Zlaté Moravce)
9	FW	SVK	Roland Gerebenits (loan return from FK Pohronie)
—	FW	NGR	Taofiq Jibril (on loan from (Portugal) Portimonense S.C.)

Out: Note: Flags indicate national team as defined under FIFA eligibility rules; some limited exceptions apply. Players may hold more than one non-FIFA nationality.

No.	Pos.	Nation	Player
—	DF	SVK	Peter Chríbik (to FK Pohronie)
—	MF	SVK	Martin Kovaľ (Released and joined FC ViOn Zlaté Moravce)
—	MF	ARG	Iván Díaz (to TBA)
—	FW	SVK	Roland Gerebenits (on loan to FK Železiarne Podbrezová)

=== FC DAC 1904 Dunajská Streda ===
In: Note: Flags indicate national team as defined under FIFA eligibility rules; some limited exceptions apply. Players may hold more than one non-FIFA nationality.

No.	Pos.	Nation	Player
—	FW	CGO	Yhoan Andzouana (from (Belgium) K.S.V. Roeselare)
—	FW	SVK	Jakub Švec (loan return from FC ViOn Zlaté Moravce)
—	DF	GER	Jannik Müller (from (Germany) Dynamo Dresden)
—	MF	GER	Sidney Friede (from (Germany) SV Wehen Wiesbaden)
—	MF	SVK	Sebastian Nebyla (from (England) West Ham Academy)
—	MF	CRO	Andrija Balić (from (Italy) Udinese Calcio)
—	DF	PAN	Jorge Méndez (from FC DAC 1904 Dunajská Streda U19)
98	FW	MDA	Ion Nicolaescu (from (Belarus) FC Shakhtyor Soligorsk)
—	DF	GER	Niklas Sommer (from (Germany) SG Sonnenhof Großaspach)

Out: Note: Flags indicate national team as defined under FIFA eligibility rules; some limited exceptions apply. Players may hold more than one non-FIFA nationality.

No.	Pos.	Nation	Player
17	DF	CRO	Lorenco Šimić (loan return to (Italy) Sampdoria)
—	MF	SVK	Lukáš Čmelík (Released and joined (Czech Republic) MFK Karviná)
—	MF	SVK	Kristián Bari (to MŠK Žilina)
—	FW	SVK	Sebastián Gembický (to FC Spartak Trnava)
—	GK	SVK	Adrián Slančík (to FK Senica)
—	MF	PAN	Ricardo Hinds (on loan to MFK Zemplín Michalovce)
—	DF	SVK	Dominik Špiriak (on loan to FK Pohronie)
—	FW	HUN	Krisztián Németh (Released and joined (United States) Columbus Crew SC)
—	DF	SRB	Dušan Lalatović (to (Serbia) FK Partizan)
—	DF	SVK	Milan Šimčák (to FK Senica)
—	MF	SVK	Martin Bednár (on loan to MFK Zemplín Michalovce)
—	FW	NGR	Abdulrahman Taiwo (on loan to MFK Zemplín Michalovce)

=== FC Spartak Trnava ===
In: Note: Flags indicate national team as defined under FIFA eligibility rules; some limited exceptions apply. Players may hold more than one non-FIFA nationality.

No.	Pos.	Nation	Player
—	FW	SVK	Stanislav Olejník (from FK Poprad)
—	MF	SVK	Ján Vlasko (from (Hungary) Puskás Akadémia FC)
—	FW	SVK	Sebastián Gembický (from FC DAC 1904 Dunajská Streda)
—	DF	SVK	Sebastian Kóša (from FC Nitra)
—	DF	SVK	Mário Mihál (from FK Senica)
—	MF	SVK	Jakub Grič (from MFK Zemplín Michalovce)
—	MF	SVK	Tomáš Hambálek (from FC Nitra)
—	DF	SVK	Marek Václav (from FK Dubnica)
—	FW	SVK	Erik Pačinda (from (Czech Republic) FC Viktoria Plzeň)
—	MF	SVK	Martin Bukata (from (Czech Republic) MFK Karviná)
—	DF	ISL	Birkir Valur Jónsson (on loan from (Iceland) HK)
—	MF	SVK	Martin Mikovič (from (Poland) Nieciecza)
—	MF	GRE	Kyriakos Savvidis (from Free agent)
—	DF	GRE	Dimitris Konstantinidis (from Free agent)
—	DF	GRE	Marios Tsaousis (on loan from (Greece) PAOK FC)
—	MF	SVK	Peter Kolesár (from MFK Zemplín Michalovce)

Out: Note: Flags indicate national team as defined under FIFA eligibility rules; some limited exceptions apply. Players may hold more than one non-FIFA nationality.

No.	Pos.	Nation	Player
—	DF	SVK	Jozef Menich (to FC ViOn Zlaté Moravce)
—	DF	SWE	Malkolm Moënza (End of contract and joined (Sweden) Dalkurd FF)
—	MF	SWE	Dijan Vukojević (End of contract and joined (Sweden) Norrby IF)
—	DF	SVK	Jakub Krč (End of contract)
—	MF	GRE	Theofanis Tzandaris (End of contract)
—	FW	AUT	Alex Sobczyk (Released and joined (Poland) Górnik Zabrze)
—	MF	CRO	Marko Tešija (Released and joined (Greece) Xanthi F.C.)
—	MF	SVK	Martin Gamboš (loan return to MŠK Žilina)
—	DF	SVK	Oliver Burian (on loan to FC Petržalka)
—	MF	SVK	Alexander Horvát (on loan to FC Petržalka)
—	FW	SVK	Štefan Molnár (to MŠK Hurbanovo)

=== MFK Zemplín Michalovce ===
In: Note: Flags indicate national team as defined under FIFA eligibility rules; some limited exceptions apply. Players may hold more than one non-FIFA nationality.

No.	Pos.	Nation	Player
—	FW	SVK	Adam Griger (from FK Poprad youth)
—	DF	UKR	Artem Vovkun (from MFK Zemplín Michalovce U19)
—	FW	UKR	Maksym Hirnyi (from MFK Zemplín Michalovce U19)
—	MF	SVK	Michal Tóth (from MFK Zemplín Michalovce youth)
—	MF	SVK	Jakub Sova (from MFK Zemplín Michalovce youth)
—	MF	SVK	Lukáš Lukčo (from MFK Zemplín Michalovce U19)
—	MF	PAN	Ricardo Hinds (on loan from FC DAC 1904 Dunajská Streda)
—	DF	SVK	Filip Vaško (on loan from (Italy) Udinese Calcio)
—	DF	GRE	Polydefkis Volanakis (from (Greece) Aris U17)
—	MF	SVK	Kamil Rečičár (on loan from 1. FC Tatran Prešov youth)
—	GK	BIH	Matej Marković (from (Bosnia and Herzegovina) FK Sarajevo)
—	MF	CYP	Danilo Špoljarić (on loan from (Cyprus) Apollon Limassol)
—	MF	RUS	Sergei Ivanov (on loan from (Russia) FC Zenit-2 Saint Petersburg)
—	DF	GRE	Dimitris Siopis (from (Greece) Doxa Drama)
—	MF	GRE	Vasilios Dotis (from (Greece) Olympiacos U19)
—	MF	SVK	Martin Bednár (on loan from Dunajská Streda)
—	FW	NGR	Abdulrahman Taiwo (on loan from Dunajská Streda)
—	FW	BIH	Ismar Tandir (from (Czech Republic) SK Sigma Olomouc)

Out: Note: Flags indicate national team as defined under FIFA eligibility rules; some limited exceptions apply. Players may hold more than one non-FIFA nationality.

No.	Pos.	Nation	Player
—	MF	SVK	Jakub Grič (to FC Spartak Trnava)
—	MF	SVK	Peter Kolesár (to FC Spartak Trnava)
—	DF	ESP	José Carrillo (Released and joined FK Senica)
—	MF	FRA	Cheikh-Alan Diarra (to TBA)
—	MF	GRE	Kyriakos Savvidis (Released and joined FC Spartak Trnava)
—	MF	SVK	Milan Kvocera (to (Poland) Radomiak Radom)
—	MF	SVK	Jozef-Šimon Turík (to TBA)
—	DF	SVK	Stanislav Danko (to TBA)
—	GK	SVK	Matúš Kira (to FC Košice)
—	FW	ARM	Armen Hovhannisyan (loan return to FC Ararat-Armenia)
—	MF	SVK	Marián Pásztor (Released)
—	DF	GRE	Dimitris Konstantinidis (Released and joined FC Spartak Trnava)
—	FW	NIG	Issa Modibo Sidibé (to KFC Komárno)

=== MFK Ružomberok ===
In: Note: Flags indicate national team as defined under FIFA eligibility rules; some limited exceptions apply. Players may hold more than one non-FIFA nationality.

No.	Pos.	Nation	Player
—	FW	SVK	Martin Boďa (from MŠK Fomat Martin)

Out: Note: Flags indicate national team as defined under FIFA eligibility rules; some limited exceptions apply. Players may hold more than one non-FIFA nationality.

No.	Pos.	Nation	Player
—	DF	SVK	Michal Jonec (to FC Košice)
—	DF	SVK	Martin Huba (on loan to FC Petržalka)
—	MF	SVK	Jakub Kudlička (on loan to FC Petržalka)
—	MF	SVK	Viktor Jedinák (on loan to FC Petržalka)
—	MF	SVK	Mário Almaský (to OŠK Bešeňová)
—	MF	SVK	Miroslav Almaský (to MFK Skalica)
—	MF	CZE	Filip Twardzik (to (Czech Republic) Karviná)

=== AS Trenčín ===
In: Note: Flags indicate national team as defined under FIFA eligibility rules; some limited exceptions apply. Players may hold more than one non-FIFA nationality.

No.	Pos.	Nation	Player
—	DF	FIN	Juha Pirinen (from (Norway) Tromsø IL)
—	FW	USA	Eduvie Ikoba (from (Hungary) Zalaegerszegi TE)
—	MF	NGR	Philip Azango (from (Belgium) Gent)

Out: Note: Flags indicate national team as defined under FIFA eligibility rules; some limited exceptions apply. Players may hold more than one non-FIFA nationality.

No.	Pos.	Nation	Player
—	DF	TTO	Keston Julien (End of contract - joined (Moldova) FC Sheriff Tiraspol)
—	MF	GHA	Mohammed Lamine (to (Portugal) Oliveirense)
—	FW	CUW	Gino van Kessel (End of contract - joined (Cyprus) Olympiakos Nicosia)
—	MF	NED	Ryan Koolwijk (Released and joined (Netherlands) Almere City FC)
—	DF	ENG	Cole Kpekawa (Released)
—	DF	CPV	Erik Nielson (Released)
—	FW	GHA	Osman Bukari (to (Belgium) K.A.A. Gent)

=== FC ViOn Zlaté Moravce ===
In: Note: Flags indicate national team as defined under FIFA eligibility rules; some limited exceptions apply. Players may hold more than one non-FIFA nationality.

No.	Pos.	Nation	Player
—	DF	SVK	Jozef Menich (from FC Spartak Trnava)
—	MF	SVK	Marián Šmatlák (from FC Nitra youth)
—	FW	SLO	Nermin Haljeta (from (Bosnia and Herzegovina) FK Zvijezda 09)
–	MF	SRB	Marko Vujič (from (Serbia) FK Partizan)
—	MF	SVK	Martin Kovaľ (from MŠK Žilina)
—	MF	SVK	Matej Moško (on loan from MŠK Žilina)
—	GK	SVK	Patrik Lukáč (from (Poland) Elana Toruń)
—	FW	SVK	Filip Balaj (from MŠK Žilina)
—	GK	SVK	Adrián Chovan (from AS Trenčín)
—	MF	GRE	Alexandros Kyziridis (from (Greece) Volos)

Out: Note: Flags indicate national team as defined under FIFA eligibility rules; some limited exceptions apply. Players may hold more than one non-FIFA nationality.

No.	Pos.	Nation	Player
—	MF	SVK	Jakub Brašeň (End of professional career)
—	MF	SVK	Martin Kovaľ (loan return to MŠK Žilina)
—	GK	SVK	Adrián Chovan (loan return to AS Trenčín)
—	FW	SVK	Jakub Švec (loan return to FC DAC 1904 Dunajská Streda)
—	FW	MNE	Boris Cmiljanić (loan return to ŠK Slovan Bratislava)
—	FW	SVK	Marko Kelemen (loan return to FC Spartak Trnava)
—	FW	SVK	András Mészáros (loan return to FK Pohronie)
—	DF	CRO	Antonio Asanović (Released)
—	MF	SVK	Martin Válovčan (Released)
—	MF	SVK	Dávid Richtárech (Released)
1	GK	SVK	Branislav Pindroch (to (Poland) Raków Częstochowa)
—	FW	BRA	Gustavo (loan return to (Brazil) EC São Bernardo)

=== ŠKF Sereď ===
In: Note: Flags indicate national team as defined under FIFA eligibility rules; some limited exceptions apply. Players may hold more than one non-FIFA nationality.

No.	Pos.	Nation	Player
—	MF	CRO	Roko Jureškin (loan return from MŠK Žilina B)
—	FW	SVK	András Mészáros (on loan from FK Pohronie)
—	MF	BIH	Alen Mehić (on loan from (Italy) Atalanta B.C.)
—	MF	SVK	Filip Tatranský (from AS Trenčín)
—	MF	KOR	Bae Beom-geun (from (Malaysia) Petaling Jaya City FC)
—	MF	CRO	Matija Mišić (from (Hungary) Soroksár SC)
—	MF	CRO	Denis Bušnja (on loan from (Croatia) HNK Rijeka)
—	DF	URU	Álvaro Pereira (from (Paraguay) Club River Plate (Asunción))
—	DF	DJI	Warsama Hassan (from Free agent)
—	GK	NGR	Ikuepamitan Ayotunde Ezekiel (from (Croatia) NK Vodice)
—	FW	COL	Carlos Ibargüen (from (Mexico) Tigres UANL)

Out: Note: Flags indicate national team as defined under FIFA eligibility rules; some limited exceptions apply. Players may hold more than one non-FIFA nationality.

No.	Pos.	Nation	Player
—	MF	BRA	Cléber (Released)
1	GK	BIH	Adnan Kanurić (to (Bosnia and Herzegovina) FK Sarajevo)

=== FK Pohronie ===
In: Note: Flags indicate national team as defined under FIFA eligibility rules; some limited exceptions apply. Players may hold more than one non-FIFA nationality.

No.	Pos.	Nation	Player
—	DF	SVK	Peter Chríbik (from MŠK Žilina)
—	DF	SVK	Erik Kramár (from (Czech Republic) FC Zbrojovka Brno U19)
—	DF	SVK	Dominik Špiriak (from FC DAC 1904 Dunajská Streda)
—	DF	FRA	David Bangala (from (France) ESM Gonfreville)
—	DF	SVK	Bernard Petrák (on loan from MŠK Žilina)
TBA	FW	BDI	Bonfils-Caleb Bimenyimana (on loan from (Latvia) FK RFS)
TBA	MF	SUI	Ivan Audino (from Free agent)

Out: Note: Flags indicate national team as defined under FIFA eligibility rules; some limited exceptions apply. Players may hold more than one non-FIFA nationality.

No.	Pos.	Nation	Player
9	FW	SVK	Roland Gerebenits (loan return to MŠK Žilina II)
33	DF	BRA	Jacy (loan return to (Brazil) Capivariano)
10	FW	BIH	Ismar Tandir (loan return to (Czech Republic) Sigma Olomouc)
—	MF	SVK	Patrik Košuda (on loan to FC Košice)
—	DF	SVK	Ján Hatok (to 1. FC Tatran Prešov)
—	MF	SVK	Ján Dzúrik (to Partizán Bardejov)
—	MF	SVK	Lukáš Pelegríni (on loan to FK Sitno Banská Štiavnica)
—	MF	SVK	Patrik Abrahám (on loan to MFK Nová Baňa)
—	DF	CAN	Ryan Lindsay (Released)

=== FK Senica ===
In: Note: Flags indicate national team as defined under FIFA eligibility rules; some limited exceptions apply. Players may hold more than one non-FIFA nationality.

No.	Pos.	Nation	Player
—	DF	SVK	Tomáš Šalata (from Free agent)
—	DF	SVK	Jakub Nemec (from FC Petržalka)
—	DF	SVK	Daniel Filip Mašulovič (from ŠK Slovan Bratislava B)
—	GK	SVK	Adrián Slančík (from FC DAC 1904 Dunajská Streda)
—	GK	CZE	Tomáš Fryšták (from Free agent)
—	MF	FRA	Damien Marie (from (Bulgaria) FC Tsarsko Selo Sofia)
—	FW	CZE	Oskar Fotr (from (Czech Republic) FC Vlašim)
—	DF	ISL	Nói Snaehólm Ólafsson (from Free agent)
—	MF	CRO	Jurica Bajić (on loan from (Croatia) Hajduk Split)
—	DF	SVK	Milan Šimčák (from DAC 1904 Dunajská Streda)
—	DF	SVK	Vladimír Barbora (on loan from MŠK Žilina)
—	FW	SVK	Tomáš Malec (from Free agent)
—	MF	SVK	Martin Košťál (on loan from (Poland) Jagiellonia Białystok)
—	DF	ESP	José Carrillo (from Free agent)
—	DF	SRB	Filip Maksić (on loan from (Czech Republic) Sparta Prague)
—	FW	GRE	Ioannis Niarchos (on loan from (Greece) Panathinaikos F.C.)
—	MF	SVK	Dávid Gallovič (from FK Poprad)
—	DF	CZE	Miloš Kopečný (on loan from (Czech Republic) České Budějovice)
—	FW	SWE	Ardian Berisha (from (Kosovo) KF Trepça '89)
—	DF	CRO	Antonio Asanović (from Free Agent)

Out: Note: Flags indicate national team as defined under FIFA eligibility rules; some limited exceptions apply. Players may hold more than one non-FIFA nationality.

No.	Pos.	Nation	Player
—	DF	SVK	Mário Mihál (to FC Spartak Trnava)
—	GK	CZE	Vojtěch Vorel (loan return to (Czech Republic) Sparta Prague)
—	DF	CMR	Joss Didiba (on loan to (Czech Republic) SFC Opava)
—	DF	SVK	Kristián Lukáčik (to TBA)
13	DF	SVK	Vladimír Barbora (Released)
26	DF	SVK	Tomáš Šalata (Released)
9	MF	FRA	Damien Marie (Released)

=== FC Nitra ===
In: Note: Flags indicate national team as defined under FIFA eligibility rules; some limited exceptions apply. Players may hold more than one non-FIFA nationality.

No.	Pos.	Nation	Player
—	MF	BIH	Alen Mustafić (on loan from (Slovakia) Slovan Bratislava)
—	FW	ARM	Armen Hovhannisyan (from FC Ararat-Armenia)
—	MF	SVK	Martin Adamec (from (Poland) Jagiellonia Białystok)
—	DF	SVK	Timotej Záhumenský (from FC DAC 1904 Dunajská Streda)
—	GK	SVK	Michal Trnovský (on loan from MFK Dukla Banská Bystrica)
—	DF	SVK	Kristián Kolčák (from FC Petržalka)
—	GK	ISR	Ariel Harush (from (Israel) Hapoel Be'er Sheva F.C.)

Out: Note: Flags indicate national team as defined under FIFA eligibility rules; some limited exceptions apply. Players may hold more than one non-FIFA nationality.

No.	Pos.	Nation	Player
—	FW	SVK	Tomáš Hambálek (to FC Spartak Trnava)
—	DF	SVK	Sebastian Kóša (to FC Spartak Trnava)
—	DF	BRA	Silva (loan return to (Brazil) Grêmio Novorizontino)
—	DF	BRA	Jesus (loan return to (Brazil) Grêmio Novorizontino)
—	MF	CRO	Duje Javorčić (Released)
—	DF	SVK	Ondrej Elexa (Released)
—	DF	UKR	Dmytro Nyemchaninov (Released)
—	DF	UGA	Isaac Muleme (Released)
—	DF	KAZ	Midat Galbayev (Released)
—	FW	MKD	Milan Ristovski (loan return to (Croatia) HNK Rijeka)
—	MF	SVK	Šimon Štefanec (loan return to (Italy) Hellas Verona F.C.)
—	FW	CRO	Ante Kuliš (Released)
—	DF	SVK	Patrik Šurnovský (to ŠK Šurany)
—	GK	SVK	Martin Kuciak (to MŠK Považská Bystrica)
—	DF	SVK	Pavol Farkaš (to Spartak Myjava)

== 2. liga ==
=== FK Dubnica ===
In: Note: Flags indicate national team as defined under FIFA eligibility rules; some limited exceptions apply. Players may hold more than one non-FIFA nationality.

No.	Pos.	Nation	Player

Out: Note: Flags indicate national team as defined under FIFA eligibility rules; some limited exceptions apply. Players may hold more than one non-FIFA nationality.

No.	Pos.	Nation	Player
—	FW	SVK	Daniel Hundák (loan return to MŠK Žilina B)
—	MF	SVK	Matej Jakúbek (loan return to FC Spartak Trnava)
—	MF	SVK	Marek Václav (to FC Spartak Trnava)

=== MFK Dukla Banská Bystrica ===
In: Note: Flags indicate national team as defined under FIFA eligibility rules; some limited exceptions apply. Players may hold more than one non-FIFA nationality.

No.	Pos.	Nation	Player
—	MF	SVK	Marek Frimmel (from MFK Skalica)
—	GK	SVK	Matúš Hruška (from FK Dukla Prague)

Out: Note: Flags indicate national team as defined under FIFA eligibility rules; some limited exceptions apply. Players may hold more than one non-FIFA nationality.

No.	Pos.	Nation	Player
—	MF	SVK	Blažej Vaščák (End of contract)
—	MF	SVK	Peter Kolláti (to FK Rakytovce)
—	DF	SRB	Saša Savić (to ŠK Sásová)

=== MFK Skalica ===
In: Note: Flags indicate national team as defined under FIFA eligibility rules; some limited exceptions apply. Players may hold more than one non-FIFA nationality.

No.	Pos.	Nation	Player
—	MF	SVK	Michal Horodník (from Partizán Bardejov)
—	FW	SVK	Jakub Škovran (on loan from FC Košice)
—	DF	SVK	Matúš Mader (on loan from Podbrezová U19)
—	MF	SVK	Miroslav Almaský (from MFK Ružomberok)
—	DF	SVK	Richard Nemergut (on loan from Partizán Bardejov)
—	MF	POL	Piotr Straczek (from (Poland) GLKS Wilkowice)

Out: Note: Flags indicate national team as defined under FIFA eligibility rules; some limited exceptions apply. Players may hold more than one non-FIFA nationality.

No.	Pos.	Nation	Player
—	MF	SVK	Marek Frimmel (to FK Dukla Banská Bystrica)
—	DF	SRB	Mihajlo Popović (to KFC Komárno)
—	MF	SVK	Lukáš Opiela (Released)
—	FW	CZE	Roman Haša (Released and joined (Czech Republic) MFK Karviná)
—	DF	SVK	Lukáš Hlavatovič (Released)
—	GK	SVK	Vojtech Milošovič (Released)
—	DF	SVK	David Frühauf (Released)
—	MF	CZE	Daniel Pospíšil (Released)
—	DF	SVK	Tomáš Milota (Released)
—	MF	SVK	Jakub Hric (Released)

=== FK Železiarne Podbrezová ===
In: Note: Flags indicate national team as defined under FIFA eligibility rules; some limited exceptions apply. Players may hold more than one non-FIFA nationality.

No.	Pos.	Nation	Player
—	MF	SVK	Dávid Haščák (loan return from Partizán Bardejov)
—	FW	ESP	Enzo Arevalo (from FK Poprad)
—	MF	SVK	Vladimír Kukoľ (from FK Poprad)
—	MF	SVK	Erik Grendel (from FC Spartak Trnava)
—	FW	SVK	Roland Gerebenits (on loan from MŠK Žilina)
—	DF	SVK	Boris Godál (from Free agent)
—	FW	ESP	Oscar Castellano (from FK Poprad)

Out: Note: Flags indicate national team as defined under FIFA eligibility rules; some limited exceptions apply. Players may hold more than one non-FIFA nationality.

No.	Pos.	Nation	Player
—	MF	SVK	Dávid Haščák (to (Poland) LZS Starowice Dolne)

=== MŠK Žilina B ===
In: Note: Flags indicate national team as defined under FIFA eligibility rules; some limited exceptions apply. Players may hold more than one non-FIFA nationality.

No.	Pos.	Nation	Player
—	FW	SVK	Daniel Hundák (loan return from FK Dubnica)
—	FW	SVK	Tibor Slebodník (from FK Poprad)
—	MF	SVK	Alex Javro (from FC DAC 1904 Dunajská Streda)
—	FW	SVK	Adam Kostúr (from MFK Dukla Banská Bystrica U19)

Out: Note: Flags indicate national team as defined under FIFA eligibility rules; some limited exceptions apply. Players may hold more than one non-FIFA nationality.

No.	Pos.	Nation	Player

=== FK Poprad ===
In: Note: Flags indicate national team as defined under FIFA eligibility rules; some limited exceptions apply. Players may hold more than one non-FIFA nationality.

No.	Pos.	Nation	Player
—	FW	BIH	Alem Plakalo (from (Sweden) Åtvidabergs FF)
—	DF	BIH	Armin Mujkič (from (Kosovo) KF Drenica)

Out: Note: Flags indicate national team as defined under FIFA eligibility rules; some limited exceptions apply. Players may hold more than one non-FIFA nationality.

No.	Pos.	Nation	Player
—	FW	ESP	Enzo Arevalo (to FK Železiarne Podbrezová)
—	MF	NGR	Wisdom Kanu (loan return to MFK Vranov nad Topľou)
—	MF	SVK	Vladimír Kukoľ (to FK Železiarne Podbrezová)
—	DF	SVK	Lukáš Horváth (to Partizán Bardejov)
—	DF	SVK	Kamil Zekucia (to OŠK Rudňany)
—	DF	SVK	Peter Maslo (to ŠK Tvrdošín)
—	FW	SVK	Tibor Slebodník (to MŠK Žilina B)
—	DF	SVK	Martin Luberda (to 1. FC Tatran Prešov)
—	FW	BRA	Lopez Da Silva Junior (to (Austria) ATSV Stadl-Paura)
—	MF	SVK	Dávid Gallovič (to FK Senica)
—	MF	ESP	Oscar Castellano (to FK Železiarne Podbrezová)

=== MFK Tatran Liptovský Mikuláš ===
In: Note: Flags indicate national team as defined under FIFA eligibility rules; some limited exceptions apply. Players may hold more than one non-FIFA nationality.

No.	Pos.	Nation	Player

Out: Note: Flags indicate national team as defined under FIFA eligibility rules; some limited exceptions apply. Players may hold more than one non-FIFA nationality.

No.	Pos.	Nation	Player
—	GK	SVK	Patrik Gábriš (to FK Podkonice)
—	MF	SVK	Denis Čery (to OFK Malženice)
—	MF	SVK	Ivan Kotora (to TJ Tatran Oravské Veselé)
—	DF	SVK	Dušan Kucharčík (to Považská Bystrica)

=== MŠK Púchov ===
In: Note: Flags indicate national team as defined under FIFA eligibility rules; some limited exceptions apply. Players may hold more than one non-FIFA nationality.

No.	Pos.	Nation	Player
—	FW	SVK	Peter Rypák (from OFK Dunajská Lužná)
—	MF	SVK	Tobias Raffay (on loan from FK Železiarne Podbrezová)
—	DF	SVK	Martin Petro (on loan from AS Trenčín)
—	MF	SVK	Ondrej Matejka (on loan from AS Trenčín)
—	FW	SVK	Slavomír Kapusniak (on loan from TJ Tatran Krásno nad Kysucou)

Out: Note: Flags indicate national team as defined under FIFA eligibility rules; some limited exceptions apply. Players may hold more than one non-FIFA nationality.

No.	Pos.	Nation	Player

=== Partizán Bardejov ===
In: Note: Flags indicate national team as defined under FIFA eligibility rules; some limited exceptions apply. Players may hold more than one non-FIFA nationality.

No.	Pos.	Nation	Player
—	DF	SVK	Lukáš Horváth (from FK Poprad)
—	MF	SVK	Viktor Maťaš (from FK Poprad)
—	FW	SVK	Filip Serečin (from FK Humenné)
—	DF	SVK	Rastislav Švec (on loan from MFK Ružomberok)
—	MF	SVK	Filip Tatár (from (Czech Republic) FK Fotbal Třinec)
—	MF	SVK	Ján Dzúrik (from FK Pohronie)

Out: Note: Flags indicate national team as defined under FIFA eligibility rules; some limited exceptions apply. Players may hold more than one non-FIFA nationality.

No.	Pos.	Nation	Player
—	MF	SVK	Michal Horodník (to MFK Skalica)
—	MF	SVK	Dávid Haščák (loan return to FK Železiarne Podbrezová)
—	DF	SVK	Richard Nemergut (on loan to MFK Skalica)

=== FC ŠTK 1914 Šamorín ===
In: Note: Flags indicate national team as defined under FIFA eligibility rules; some limited exceptions apply. Players may hold more than one non-FIFA nationality.

No.	Pos.	Nation	Player
—	GK	SVK	Frederik Valach (from FC Petržalka)

Out: Note: Flags indicate national team as defined under FIFA eligibility rules; some limited exceptions apply. Players may hold more than one non-FIFA nationality.

No.	Pos.	Nation	Player

=== FC Košice ===
In: Note: Flags indicate national team as defined under FIFA eligibility rules; some limited exceptions apply. Players may hold more than one non-FIFA nationality.

No.	Pos.	Nation	Player
—	MF	SVK	Patrik Košuda (on loan from FK Pohronie)
—	DF	SVK	Michal Jonec (from MFK Ružomberok)
—	GK	SVK	Matúš Kira (from MFK Zemplín Michalovce)
—	MF	SVK	Jozef-Šimon Turík (from Free Agent)

Out: Note: Flags indicate national team as defined under FIFA eligibility rules; some limited exceptions apply. Players may hold more than one non-FIFA nationality.

No.	Pos.	Nation	Player
—	MF	SVK	Dávid Leško (Released)
—	FW	SVK	Jakub Bavoľár (on loan to FK Humenné)
—	FW	SVK	Jakub Škovran (on loan to MFK Skalica)
—	DF	SVK	Matúš Katunský (on loan to FK Slavoj Trebišov)
—	MF	UKR	Maksym Rizie (on loan to FK Slavoj Trebišov)

=== KFC Komárno ===
In: Note: Flags indicate national team as defined under FIFA eligibility rules; some limited exceptions apply. Players may hold more than one non-FIFA nationality.

No.	Pos.	Nation	Player
—	DF	SRB	Mihajlo Popović (from MFK Skalica)
—	FW	NIG	Issa Modibo Sidibé (from MFK Zemplín Michalovce)

Out: Note: Flags indicate national team as defined under FIFA eligibility rules; some limited exceptions apply. Players may hold more than one non-FIFA nationality.

No.	Pos.	Nation	Player

=== FC Petržalka ===
In: Note: Flags indicate national team as defined under FIFA eligibility rules; some limited exceptions apply. Players may hold more than one non-FIFA nationality.

No.	Pos.	Nation	Player
—	DF	SVK	Martin Huba (on loan from MFK Ružomberok)
—	MF	SVK	Jakub Kudlička (on loan from MFK Ružomberok)
—	FW	SVK	Viktor Jedinák (on loan from MFK Ružomberok)
—	DF	SVK	Tomáš Filipiak (on loan from MFK Ružomberok)
—	DF	SVK	Samuel Jenat (on loan from FK Železiarne Podbrezová)
—	DF	SVK	Oliver Burian (on loan from FC Spartak Trnava)
—	MF	SVK	Alexander Horvát (on loan from FC Spartak Trnava)
—	FW	SVK	Štefan Molnár (on loan from FC Spartak Trnava)

Out: Note: Flags indicate national team as defined under FIFA eligibility rules; some limited exceptions apply. Players may hold more than one non-FIFA nationality.

No.	Pos.	Nation	Player
—	FW	SVK	Marek Bobček (loan return to MFK Ružomberok)
—	GK	SVK	Libor Hrdlička (loan return to (Czech Republic) MFK Karviná)
—	DF	SVK	Samuel Ďurek (to 1. FC Tatran Prešov)
—	DF	SVK	Jakub Nemec (to FK Senica)
—	DF	SVK	Samuel Kozlovský (loan return to Slovan Bratislava B)
—	MF	SVK	Filip Maník (loan return to Partizán Bardejov)
—	MF	SVK	Pavel Sokol (loan return to (Czech Republic) FK Pardubice)
—	FW	SVK	Matúš Almáši (loan return to ŠK Báhoň)
—	GK	SVK	Frederik Valach (to FC ŠTK 1914 Šamorín)
—	DF	SVK	Kristián Kolčák (to FC Nitra)

=== ŠK Slovan Bratislava B ===
In: Note: Flags indicate national team as defined under FIFA eligibility rules; some limited exceptions apply. Players may hold more than one non-FIFA nationality.

No.	Pos.	Nation	Player

Out: Note: Flags indicate national team as defined under FIFA eligibility rules; some limited exceptions apply. Players may hold more than one non-FIFA nationality.

No.	Pos.	Nation	Player
—	DF	SVK	Daniel Filip Mašulovič (to FK Senica)

=== FK Slavoj Trebišov ===
In: Note: Flags indicate national team as defined under FIFA eligibility rules; some limited exceptions apply. Players may hold more than one non-FIFA nationality.

No.	Pos.	Nation	Player
—	MF	NGR	Wisdom Kanu (from MFK Vranov nad Topľou)
—	FW	SVK	Matúš Digoň (from MFK Vranov nad Topľou)
—	MF	SVK	František Sitarčík (from MFK Vranov nad Topľou)
—	GK	SVK	Milan Vinclér (from 1. FC Tatran Prešov)
—	DF	SVK	Dávid Špak (from MŠK Tesla Stropkov)
—	DF	UKR	Yehor Smirnov (from (Ukraine) VPK Agro Magdalinovka)
—	FW	SRB	Predrag Radovanović (on loan from FC Košice)
—	DF	SVK	Matúš Katunský (on loan from FC Košice)
—	MF	UKR	Maksym Rizie (on loan from FC Košice)
—	MF	SVK	Patrik Chovan (on loan from MFK Zemplín Michalovce)
—	DF	SVK	Cyprián Vaľko (on loan from Jupie FK Banská Bystrica)
—	DF	SVK	Vladimír Bajtoš (on loan from MFK Ružomberok)

Out: Note: Flags indicate national team as defined under FIFA eligibility rules; some limited exceptions apply. Players may hold more than one non-FIFA nationality.

No.	Pos.	Nation	Player
—	GK	SVK	Richard Gmitter (loan return to Partizán Bardejov)
—	DF	SVK	Ľubomír Korijkov (to Slávia TU Košice)
—	DF	SVK	Róbert Cicman (to FK Čaňa)
—	MF	SVK	Štefan Harvila (loan return to FC Lokomotíva Košice and joined FK Humenné)
