= Artem Shcherbak =

Ukrainian footballer

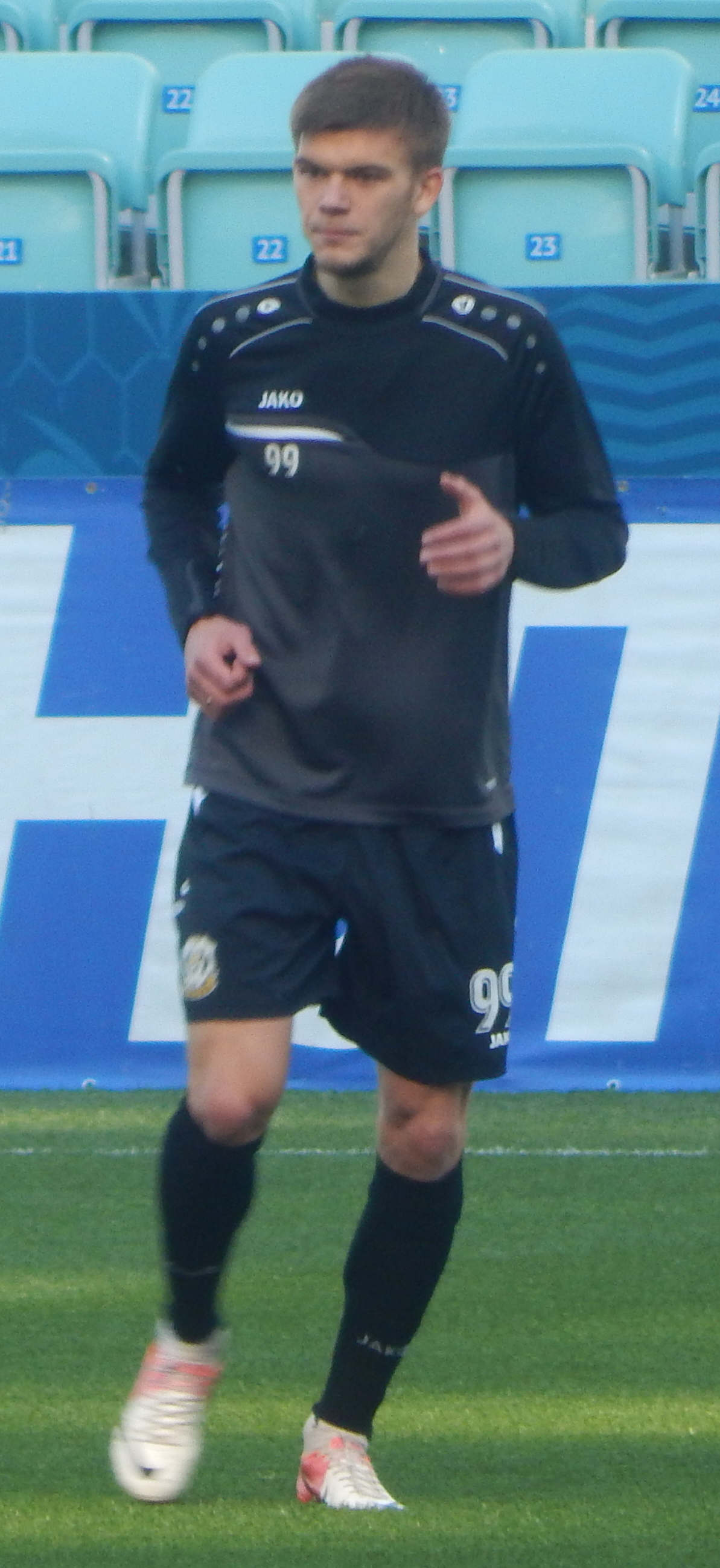
- 2019 Russian National Football League,

Personal information
- Full name: Artem Yuriyovych Shcherbak
- Date of birth: 3 September 1996 (age 30)
- Place of birth: Kerch, Ukraine
- Height: 1.85 m (6 ft 1 in)
- Position: Forward

Youth career
- –2013: FC Metalurh Donetsk

Senior career*
Years	Team	Apps	(Gls)
2012–2014	FC Metalurh Donetsk	0	(0)
2014–2018	FC Ocean Kerch	92	(14)
2019	FC Tyumen	9	(0)
2020	FC Yevpatoria	10	(1)
2021	FC Ocean Kerch	12	(1)
2021	FC Olimp-Dolgoprudny	6	(1)
- * Club domestic league appearances and goals

Artem Yuriyovych Shcherbak (Ukrainian: Артем Юрійович Щербак; born 3 September 1996) is a Ukrainian former football player. Following the annexation of Crimea by Russia in 2014, he also acquired Russian citizenship as Artyom Yuryevich Shcherbak (Russian: Артём Юрьевич Щербак).

== Club career ==
On 7 February 2019, he signed a 1.5-year contract with the Russian Football National League club FC Tyumen.

He made his debut in the FNL for Tyumen on 3 March 2019 in a game against FC Sibir Novosibirsk, as a 56th minute substitute for Maksim Votinov.
