= Vernon De Marco =

Argentine-Slovak footballer (born 1992)

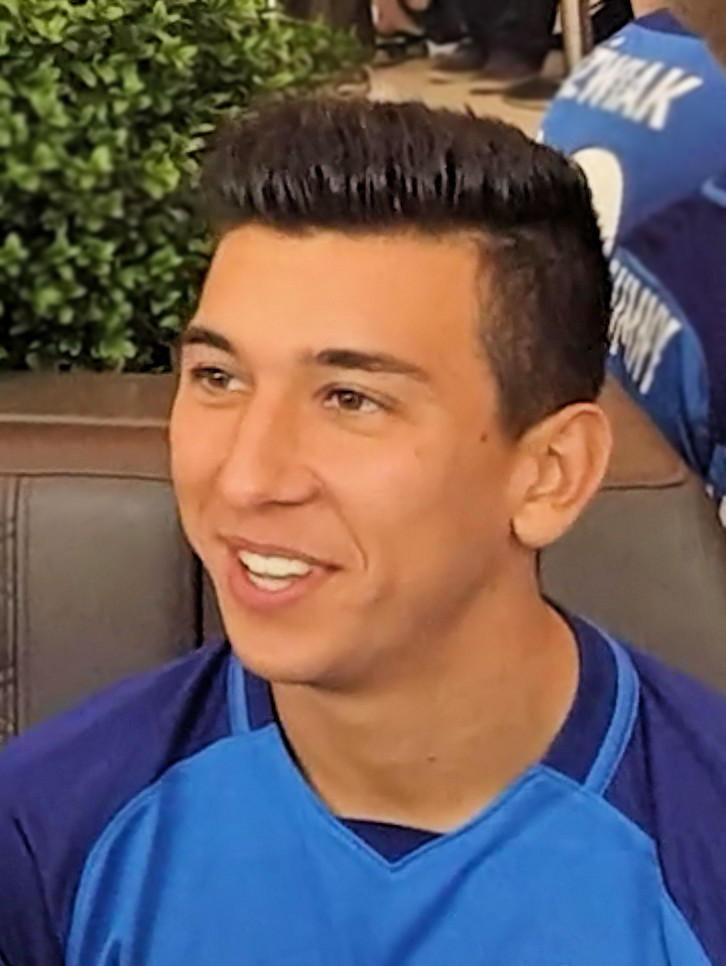
- De Marco in 2017

Personal information
- Full name: Vernon De Marco Morlacchi
- Date of birth: 18 November 1992 (age 33)
- Place of birth: Córdoba, Argentina
- Height: 1.82 m (6 ft 0 in)
- Positions: Centre-back; left-back

Team information
- Current team: Omonia Aradippou
- Number: 81

Youth career
- Arenal
- –2011: San Francisco

Senior career*
Years	Team	Apps	(Gls)
2011–2012	Constància	13	(0)
2012–2016	Zemplín Michalovce	94	(14)
2016	→ Slovan Bratislava (loan)	10	(1)
2017–2023	Slovan Bratislava	99	(9)
2017–2019	→ Lech Poznań (loan)	17	(0)
2017–2019	→ Lech Poznań II (loan)	18	(6)
2023–2024	Hatta	21	(0)
2024–2025	Apollon Limassol	23	(1)
2025–2026	Panserraikos	28	(2)
2026–	Omonia Aradippou	2	(1)

International career
2021–2024	Slovakia	10	(1)
- * Club domestic league appearances and goals as of 6 September 2026

Vernon De Marco Morlacchi (born 18 November 1992) is a professional footballer who plays as a defender for Cypriot First Division club Omonia Aradippou. Born in Argentina, he played for the Slovakia national team.

== Club career ==
Born in Córdoba, De Marco moved to Mallorca, Spain with his family in 2001, following the Corralito measures as part of the 1998–2002 Argentine great depression. De Marco spent a few months in Mallorca, before moving to Austria for two years. At the age of 12, De Marco moved back to Mallorca, joining Arenal in the process. De Marco's performances at Arenal resulted in Pepe Gálvez calling him up to represent the Balearic Islands at under-18 level. De Marco later moved to San Francisco under the management of Toni Amor.

On 14 July 2011, De Marco moved to Constància. During the 2011–12 season, De Marco made 13 appearances in the Tercera División as Constància won the league, gaining promotion to the Segunda División B. During his time at Constància, De Marco earned €225 a month, supplementing his wages by working as a waiter in a hotel.

On 22 July 2012, De Marco moved abroad, joining Slovak 2. Liga club Zemplín Michalovce. A regular starter for the club, he contributed with seven goals in 24 appearances during the 2014–15 season, as his side achieved promotion to Fortuna Liga.

De Marco made his professional debut on 18 July 2015, coming on as a second-half substitute for Jozef-Šimon Turík in a 1–0 home loss against AS Trenčín. He scored his first goal in the category on 1 August, netting his team's first in a 6–2 away loss against ŽP Šport Podbrezová.

During the summer of 2016, De Marco signed for Slovan Bratislava on a six-month loan deal following time on trial at Levante. On 17 June 2017, he was loaned to Ekstraklasa side Lech Poznań, after joining Slovan Bratislava on a permanent deal. His loan from Slovan Bratislava finished at the end of 2018–19 season.

In July 2023, following the expiry of his contract with Slovan Bratislava, De Marco signed for UAE Pro League side Hatta. Serving as the club's captain during his tenure, he departed from the club after one season, after its relegation to UAE First Division League.

== International career ==
While fans have discussed his nomination for UEFA Euro 2020, De Marco was first called up to the senior national team by Štefan Tarkovič for three 2022 World Cup qualifiers against Slovenia, Croatia and Cyprus in September 2021. He debuted with Slovakia in a 6–0 2022 World Cup qualification win over Malta coming on as a sub in the 70th minute, and scored on his debut in the 72nd minute.

== Personal life ==
Born an Argentine citizen, De Marco received Slovak citizenship in late May 2021, following an application earlier that year, making him eligible to represent Slovakia internationally. De Marco is a multilinguist speaking fluently in native Spanish as well as Slovak, English, German, Polish and Portuguese.

== Career statistics ==
=== Club ===
As of match played 14 June 2026

Appearances and goals by club, season and competition
Club	Season	League			National cup (Note: Includes Slovak Cup, Polish Cup, UAE President's Cup, UAE League Cup, Cypriot Cup)		Europe		Total	
Club	Season	Division	Apps	Goals	Apps	Goals	Apps	Goals	Apps	Goals
Zemplín Michalovce	2012–13	2. Liga	18	0	0	0	—		18	0
Zemplín Michalovce	2013–14	2. Liga	18	2	1	0	—		19	2
Zemplín Michalovce	2014–15	2. Liga	24	7	2	1	—		26	8
Zemplín Michalovce	2015–16	Slovak Super Liga	30	5	2	0	—		32	5
Zemplín Michalovce	2016–17	Slovak Super Liga	4	0	0	0	—		4	0
Zemplín Michalovce	Total		94	14	5	1	—		99	15
Slovan Bratislava	2016–17	Slovak Super Liga	15	1	4	0	0	0	19	1
Slovan Bratislava	2019–20	Slovak Super Liga	17	1	8	0	11 (Note: Appearance(s) in UEFA Europa League)	2	36	3
Slovan Bratislava	2020–21	Slovak Super Liga	26	5	6	2	1	0	33	7
Slovan Bratislava	2021–22	Slovak Super Liga	26	1	5	0	9 (Note: Four appearances in UEFA Champions League, three appearances in UEFA Europa League, two appearances in UEFA Europa Conference League)	0	40	1
Slovan Bratislava	2022–23	Slovak Super Liga	25	2	6	0	14 (Note: Three appearances and one goal in UEFA Champions League, two appearances in UEFA Europa League, nine appearances in UEFA Europa Conference League)	1	45	3
Slovan Bratislava	Total		109	10	29	2	35	3	173	15
Lech Poznań (loan)	2017–18	Ekstraklasa	2	0	0	0	0	0	2	0
Lech Poznań (loan)	2018–19	Ekstraklasa	15	0	1	0	6	0	22	0
Lech Poznań (loan)	Total		17	0	1	0	6	0	24	0
Lech Poznań II (loan)	2017–18	III liga, group II	11	4	—		—		11	4
Lech Poznań II (loan)	2018–19	III liga, group II	7	2	—		—		7	2
Lech Poznań II (loan)	Total		18	6	—		—		18	6
Hatta	2023–24	UAE Pro League	21	0	3 (Note: One appearance in UAE President's Cup, two appearances in UAE League Cup)	0	—		24	0
Apollon Limassol	2024–25	Cypriot First Division	23	1	3	0	—		26	1
Panserraikos	2025–26	Super League Greece	28	2	1	0	—		29	2
Career total			292	32	40	3	41	3	373	38

=== International ===
As of match played 9 June 2024

Appearances and goals by national team and year
National team	Year	Apps	Goals
Slovakia
Slovakia	2021	1	1
Slovakia	2022	5	0
Slovakia	2023	1	0
Slovakia	2024	3	0
Total		10	1

Scores and results list Slovakia's goal tally first, score column indicates score after each De Marco goal.

List of international goals scored by Vernon De Marco
No.	Date	Venue	Opponent	Score	Result	Competition
1	14 November 2021	National Stadium, Ta'Qali, Malta	Malta	5–0	6–0	2022 FIFA World Cup qualification

== Honours ==
Zemplín Michalovce

- 2. Liga: 2014–15

Slovan Bratislava

- Niké Liga: 2019–20, 2020–21, 2021–22, 2022–23
- Slovnaft Cup: 2016–17, 2019–20, 2020–21

Lech Poznań II

- III liga, group II: 2018–19

Individual

- Slovak Super Liga Team of the Season: 2020-21
