= Sebastián Gembický =

Slovak footballer (born 2001)

Personal information
- Full name: Sebastián Gembický
- Date of birth: 25 April 2001 (age 25)
- Place of birth: Rimavská Sobota, Slovakia
- Height: 1.74 m (5 ft 9 in)
- Positions: Forward; winger

Team information
- Current team: Rimavská Sobota
- Number: 11

Youth career
- 2011–2014: FK Jesenské
- 2014–2015: Rimavská Sobota
- 2016–2020: DAC Dunajská Streda

Senior career*
Years	Team	Apps	(Gls)
2020–2022	Spartak Trnava	0	(0)
2020–2021	→ Petržalka (loan)	21	(1)
2021–2022	→ Zemplín Michalovce (loan)	9	(0)
2022–2025	Rimavská Sobota	0	(0)
2025–	FK Jesenské		

International career
2017	Slovakia U17	3	(0)
2019	Slovakia U18	1	(1)
2019	Slovakia U19	1	(0)
- * Club domestic league appearances and goals as of 08:55, 7 May 2026 (UTC)

Sebastián Gembický (born 25 April 2001) is a Slovak footballer who plays as a forward or winger for Rimavská Sobota.

== Early life ==
Gembický is a native of the village of Hodejovec. He started playing football in Jesenské at a young age.

== Club career ==
Gembický played for the academy of DAC Dunajská Streda before joining fellow league outfit Spartak Trnava. He would then go out on loan to second division club FC Petržalka. He scored his first and only goal for the club in a 3–0 win against FK Poprad, scoring almost 20 minutes after being substituted on. In 2021, he went on loan to Zemplín Michalovce. He made his Slovak league debut for Michalovce against DAC 1904 Dunajská Streda on 25 July 2021.

In August 2022, he joined 3rd tier side MŠK Rimavská Sobota. He was not originally part of the squad during the beginning of the season, resulting in him going abroad for work. In the autumn, Gembický scored four times for Rimavská Sobota in the third league and one goal in the Slovak Cup. Thehe 2022/2023 season was his best, scoring fourteen goals. In the following season, he scored several times.

In 2025, Gembický joined 5. Liga side FK Jesenské at the age of 24. He scored 6 goals in a 9–0 Slovak Cup win against TJ Družstevník Kráľ, completing his hat-trick in the first 20 minutes.

== International career ==
He received his first international nomination to the U-15 Slovakia team ahead of a friendly match. He scored the 8th goal of an 8–1 win against Georgia while playing for the U17 team.
