= Marko Vujič =

Serbian footballer

Personal information
- Full name: Marko Vujič
- Date of birth: 25 July 2000 (age 26)
- Height: 1.82 m (6 ft 0 in)
- Position: Centre back

Team information
- Current team: Železničar Lajkovac

Youth career
- Partizan Belgrade

Senior career*
Years	Team	Apps	(Gls)
2019	Teleoptik Zemun		
2020–2021	ViOn Zlaté Moravce	4	(0)
2021–2023	Jedinstvo Ub		
2023–2024	Vrelo Sport		
2024	Radnički Obrenovac		
2025–	Železničar Lajkovac		
- * Club domestic league appearances and goals as of 8 January 2021

Marko Vujič (born 25 July 2000) is a professional Serbian footballer who currently plays for Železničar Lajkovac as a defender.

== Club career ==
=== FC ViOn Zlaté Moravce ===
Vujič made his Fortuna Liga debut for ViOn Zlaté Moravce at ViOn Aréna against AS Trenčín on 7 November 2020. Vujič came on in the 84th minute as a replacement for David Hrnčár, with the final score of 5:0 already set, following goals by Hrnčár, Kovaľ and a hat-trick by Balaj.
