= Toni Amor =

Spanish football manager

Personal information
- Full name: Antonio Amor Fernández
- Date of birth: 6 November 1976 (age 49)
- Place of birth: Palma, Spain

Managerial career
- Years: Team
- 2001–2003: Arenal (youth)
- 2003–2005: Arenal
- 2005–2007: Atlético Baleares
- 2007–2010: Mallorca B (assistant)
- 2010–2011: San Francisco (youth)
- 2014: Al-Hilal (assistant)
- 2015: Al-Wahda (assistant)
- 2016–2017: Al-Shabab (assistant)
- 2017–2018: Ibiza
- 2019–2020: Leganés (assistant)
- 2021–2022: Monterrey (assistant)
- 2023–2024: Mallorca (assistant)
- 2024–2026: Mexico (assistant)

Antonio "Toni" Amor Fernández (born 6 November 1976) is a Spanish football manager who is the current assistant manager of the Mexico national team.

== Coaching career ==
Born Palma, Mallorca, Balearic Islands, Amor was a player but retired at the age of 23. He then became a manager of UD Arenal's youth setup, subsequently working with the reserve team before being appointed first team manager in 2003, aged just 26.

In April 2005, Amor agreed to join CD Atlético Baleares as their manager, achieving promotion to Tercera División in his first season and finishing sixth in his second, one point shy of the play-offs. On 26 July 2007, he was named Jaume Bauzà's assistant at RCD Mallorca B.

In 2010, Amor left the Bermellones and was appointed manager of CD San Francisco's Juvenil A squad. He left the latter club the following February, and in May, he moved abroad after being named technical director at Al-Wasl FC.

In April 2014, Amor signed for Al-Hilal FC, being named Sami Al-Jaber's assistant. He continued to work as an assistant at Al-Wahda FC and Al-Shabab Riyadh before returning to his home country in September 2017, after being appointed manager of UD Ibiza.

On 18 April 2018, Amor was sacked from Ibiza, and subsequently returned to his former club Arenal to work as a technical director. On 4 November of the following year, he was named Javier Aguirre's assistant at La Liga side CD Leganés. He followed Aguirre to CF Monterrey, RCD Mallorca and the Mexico national team, always as his assistant.

== Managerial statistics ==
As of 14 April 2018

Managerial record by team and tenure
Team	From	To	Record								Ref
Team	From	To	G	W	D	L	GF	GA	GD	Win %	Ref
Arenal	1 June 2003	30 May 2005	76	22	26	28	91	104	−13	28.95	
Atlético Baleares	31 May 2005	28 May 2007	76	48	16	12	164	72	+92	63.16	
Ibiza	25 September 2017	18 April 2018	28	20	6	2	78	12	+66	71.43	
Total			180	90	48	42	333	188	+145	50.00	—
