= Vasilios Dotis =

Greek footballer

Personal information
- Full name: Vasilios Dotis
- Date of birth: 8 February 2002 (age 24)
- Place of birth: Ioannina, Greece
- Height: 1.75 m (5 ft 9 in)
- Position: Attacking midfielder

Team information
- Current team: PAS Korinthos

Youth career
- 2015–2020: Olympiacos

Senior career*
Years	Team	Apps	(Gls)
2020–2022	Zemplín Michalovce	15	(0)
2023	Irodotos	5	(0)
2023	Episkopi		
2024	Marko		
2024–2025	Rethymniakos		
2025	Tilikratis		
2025–2026	Lamia		
2026–	PAS Korinthos		

International career^{‡}
2018–2019	Greece U17	4	(0)
- * Club domestic league appearances and goals as of 16 June 2023 ‡ National team caps and goals as of 15 January 2019

Vasilios Dotis (Greek: Βασίλειος Ντότης; born 8 February 2002) is a Greek professional footballer who plays as an attacking midfielder for Gamma Ethniki club PAS Korinthos.
