= Mouroukou Farras Bamba =

French professional footballer (born 1996)

Personal information
- Full name: Mouroukou Farras Bamba
- Date of birth: 3 February 1996 (age 30)
- Place of birth: Ivory Coast
- Position: Midfielder

Team information
- Current team: Zlaté Moravce
- Number: 35

Senior career*
Years	Team	Apps	(Gls)
–2015	Eureka Pro Settimo - FC Kogenhheim		
2015–2016	ViOn Zlaté Moravce	11	(2)
- * Club domestic league appearances and goals as of 1 June 2016

Mouroukou Farras Bamba (born 3 February 1996), is a French professional footballer who last played for ViOn Zlaté Moravce as a midfielder.

== Club career ==
=== FC ViOn Zlaté Moravce ===
He made his professional debut for ViOn Zlaté Moravce against ŽP Šport Podbrezová on 15 August 2015.
