= Daniel Filip Mašulovič =

Slovak footballer

Personal information
- Full name: Daniel Filip Mašulovič
- Date of birth: 30 January 1998 (age 28)
- Place of birth: Bratislava, Slovakia
- Positions: Left-back; left midfielder

Team information
- Current team: SV Wimpassing

Youth career
- Inter Bratislava
- Slovan Bratislava

Senior career*
Years	Team	Apps	(Gls)
2015–2018	Slovan Bratislava B	30	(4)
2017	Slovan Bratislava	1	(0)
2018	Ritzing		
2019–2020	Slovan Bratislava B	14	(0)
2020–2022	Senica	28	(0)
2022–2023	Hamsik Academy		
2023–	SV Wimpassing		
- * Club domestic league appearances and goals as of 7 March 2023

Daniel Filip Mašulovič (born 30 January 1998) is a Slovak footballer who currently plays for SV Wimpassing as a defender.

== Club career ==
=== ŠK Slovan Bratislava ===
Mašulovič made his Fortuna Liga debut for Slovan Bratislava on 27 May 2017 against Zemplín Michalovce.
