= UD Arenal =

Arenal
- Full name: Unió Deportiva Arenal
- Nickname: El S'Are
- Founded: 1970
- Ground: Camp Municipal, S'Arenal de Llucmajor, Spain
- Capacity: 2,000
- Chairman: Jorge Gómez, Yoyo
- Manager: Toni Romo
- League: Tercera Federación – Group 11
- 2025–26: División de Honor – Mallorca, 7th of 18 (promoted via play-offs)
Home colours	Away colours

Unió Deportiva Arenal is a football team based in S'Arenal de Llucmajor, Balearic Islands. Founded in 1970, the team plays in Tercera Federación – Group 11, holding home matches at the Camp Municipal, with a capacity of 2,000 people.

== Season to season ==
Season	Tier	Division	Place	Copa del Rey
1970–71	5	2ª Reg.	7th	
1971–72	4	1ª Reg.	13th	
1972–73	5	1ª Reg.	7th	
1973–74	5	1ª Reg.	12th	
1974–75	5	1ª Reg.	14th	
1975–76	6	2ª Reg.	2nd	
1976–77	5	1ª Reg.	14th	
1977–78	6	1ª Reg.	15th	
1978–79	7	2ª Reg.	2nd	
1979–80	6	1ª Reg.	2nd	
1980–81	5	Reg. Pref.	11th	
1981–82	5	Reg. Pref.	16th	
1982–83	5	Reg. Pref.	8th	
1983–84	5	Reg. Pref.	10th	
1984–85	5	Reg. Pref.	14th	
1985–86	5	Reg. Pref.	13th	
1986–87	5	Reg. Pref.	15th	
1987–88	5	Reg. Pref.	5th	
1988–89	4	3ª	15th	
1989–90	4	3ª	11th	

Season	Tier	Division	Place	Copa del Rey
1990–91	4	3ª	13th	
1991–92	4	3ª	16th	
1992–93	4	3ª	12th	
1993–94	4	3ª	10th	
1994–95	4	3ª	17th	
1995–96	4	3ª	19th	
1996–97	5	Reg. Pref.	2nd	
1997–98	4	3ª	16th	
1998–99	4	3ª	16th	
1999–2000	4	3ª	20th	
2000–01	5	Reg. Pref.	3rd	
2001–02	4	3ª	14th	
2002–03	4	3ª	16th	
2003–04	4	3ª	14th	
2004–05	4	3ª	13th	
2005–06	4	3ª	21st	
2006–07	5	Reg. Pref.	7th	
2007–08	5	Reg. Pref.	3rd	
2008–09	4	3ª	17th	
2009–10	4	3ª	10th	

Season	Tier	Division	Place	Copa del Rey
2010–11	4	3ª	20th	
2011–12	5	Reg. Pref.	18th	
2012–13	5	Reg. Pref.	15th	
2013–14	5	Reg. Pref.	18th	
2014–15	6	1ª Reg.	2nd	
2015–16	5	Reg. Pref.	18th	
2016–17	6	1ª Reg.	13th	
2017–18	6	1ª Reg.	12th	
2018–19	6	1ª Reg.	11th	
2019–20	6	1ª Reg.	13th	
2020–21	6	1ª Reg.	3rd	
2021–22	7	1ª Reg.	2nd	
2022–23	6	Reg. Pref.	4th	
2023–24	5	3ª Fed.	16th	
2024–25	6	Div. Hon.	12th	
2025–26	6	Div. Hon.	7th	
2026–27	5	3ª Fed.		

- 19 seasons in Tercera División
- 2 seasons in Tercera Federación

== Notable managers ==
- (Spain) Toni Amor
- (Spain) Jaume Bauzà
