= Samuel Bayón =

Spanish footballer (born 1983)

Personal information
- Full name: Samuel Bayón Garcia
- Date of birth: 15 March 1983 (age 43)
- Place of birth: Vilassar de Mar, Spain
- Height: 1.78 m (5 ft 10 in)
- Position: Winger

Youth career
- 1998–2001: Barcelona
- 2001–2002: Espanyol

Senior career*
Years	Team	Apps	(Gls)
2002–2003	Hospitalet	4	(0)
2003–2004	Premià		
2004–2005	Mataró		
2005–2007	Burgos	59	(16)
2007–2008	Alavés	17	(0)
2008–2009	Cartagena	10	(0)
2009–2010	Benidorm	33	(7)
2010–2011	Badajoz	6	(0)
2011–2012	Llagostera	13	(1)
2012	Orihuela	13	(1)
2012–2013	Badalona	11	(1)
2013–2014	Vilassar Mar	10	(1)
2014–2016	Zemplín Michalovce	66	(20)
2017	Palazzolo		
2017–2018	Gaeta		
2018	Grama		
2018–2019	Gramenet	13	(3)
2019–2020	Mataró	32	(6)
Total		287	(56)
- * Club domestic league appearances and goals

Samuel Bayón Garcia (born 15 March 1983) is a Spanish former footballer who played mainly as a right winger.
