= Aleksandr Sverchinskiy =

Belarusian footballer

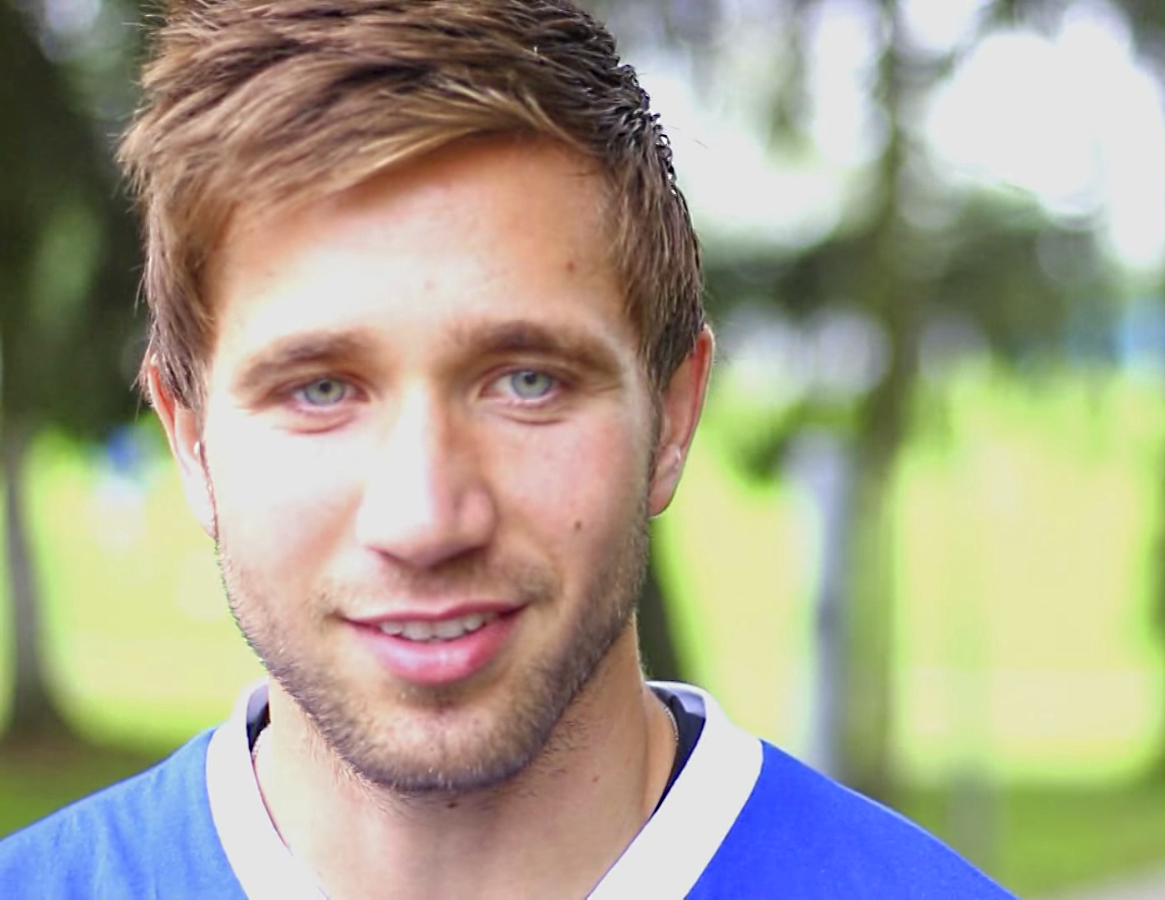

Personal information
- Full name: Aleksandr Sverchinskiy
- Date of birth: 16 September 1991 (age 35)
- Place of birth: Minsk, Belarusian SSR
- Height: 1.82 m (5 ft 11 1/2 in)
- Position: Defender

Youth career
- 2008–2010: Minsk

Senior career*
Years	Team	Apps	(Gls)
2008	Minsk-2	24	(0)
2011–2015	Minsk	94	(0)
2016	Zemplín Michalovce	12	(0)
2016	Dinamo Minsk	5	(0)
2017	Isloch Minsk Raion	10	(0)
2017	Zemplín Michalovce	11	(0)
2018	Minsk	13	(1)
2018	Gandzasar Kapan	6	(0)
- * Club domestic league appearances and goals as of 31 December 2018

Aleksandr Sverchinskiy (Belarusian: Аляксандар Свярчынскi; Russian: Александр Сверчинский; born 16 September 1991) is a Belarusian former footballer.

== Honours ==
Minsk

- Belarusian Cup winner: 2012–13
