= Nói Snaehólm Ólafsson =

Icelandic footballer

Personal information
- Full name: Nói Snaehólm Ólafsson
- Date of birth: 3 July 1994 (age 32)
- Place of birth: Iceland
- Height: 1.80 m (5 ft 11 in)
- Position: Defender

Senior career*
Years	Team	Apps	(Gls)
−2016	Norrtälje		
2017−2018	Frej	9	(0)
2018	Nyköping	15	(0)
2018−2020	Syrianska	25	(0)
2020	Senica	5	(0)
- * Club domestic league appearances and goals as of 11 January 2021

Nói Snaehólm Ólafsson (born 3 July 1994) is an Icelandic footballer who last played for Senica as a defender.

== Club career ==
Snaehólm Ólafsson made his Fortuna Liga debut for Senica against MŠK Žilina on 8 August 2020. Senica lost the first round fixture at OMS Arena through four second half goals by Dávid Ďuriš, Jakub Paur and Vahan Bichakhchyan. Ólafsson completed the entirety of the match.
