= Enzo Arevalo =

Uruguayan footballer (born 1997)

Enzo Arévalo
Personal information
- Full name: Enzo Mauro Arévalo Acosta
- Date of birth: 15 April 1997 (age 29)
- Place of birth: Montevideo, Uruguay
- Height: 1.72 m (5 ft 8 in)
- Position: Left winger

Team information
- Current team: Dukla Banská Bystrica
- Number: 29

Youth career
- Damm
- Mataró
- Cornellà

Senior career*
| Years | Team | Apps | (Gls) |
| 2016−2018 | SC Düdingen | | |
| 2017−2018 | → Sion U21 (loan) | | |
| 2019−2020 | Poprad | 28 | (5) |
| 2020−2021 | Podbrezová | 12 | (1) |
| 2022 | FCD Lions Mons Militum | | |
| 2022−2023 | Agropoli | | |
| 2023 | Dukla Banská Bystrica | 16 | (4) |
| 2024–2025 | Zemplín Michalovce | 31 | (5) |
| 2025– | Dukla Banská Bystrica | 27 | (5) |
- * Club domestic league appearances and goals as of 21 September 2026

Enzo Mauro Arévalo Acosta (born 15 April 1997) is a Uruguayan footballer who plays for Dukla Banská Bystrica as a left-winger.

== Club career ==
In his youth, he played for the Spanish teams CF Damm, Esportiu Mataró and Union Esportiva Cornellá. Then he wore the jerseys of the Swiss clubs SC Düdingen and FC Sion, until he first moved to Slovakia. In the winter of 2019, Arévalo signed for Poprad, with whom he played a play-off for promotion to the first league against Trenčín. In the summer of 2020, he transferred to Podbrezová, where he stayed for a year. Subsequently, his steps led to Italy, first playing for FCD Montemiletto and then for US Agropoli.

=== Dukla Banská Bystrica ===
Arévalo made his professional Niké Liga debut for MFK Dukla Banská Bystrica against FK Železiarne Podbrezová on 28 July 2023, in a home fixture at Štiavničky. He would provide an assist for Dukla’s only goal of the game in a 4–1 loss. In his second game, he scored a goal against league champions ŠK Slovan Bratislava. In his only season with Banská Bystrica, Arévalo scored 4 goals in 16 games.

=== Zemplín Michalovce ===
In the winter of 2024, Arévalo joined fellow league outfit MFK Zemplín Michalovce, signing a 6 month-contract. He made his debut for Zemplín in a 3–0 loss against his former club Banská Bystrica. After finishing second last, Zemplín would have to play FC Petržalka in the relegation play offs. After losing the first leg 2–1, Zemplín would win the second leg 2–0, with Arevalo scoring the second goal to guarantee safety.

=== Return to Banská Bystrica ===
On 20 June 2025, it was announced that Arevalo would be returning to Banská Bystrica, this time in the 2. Liga.
