= Joan Sánchez =

Spanish footballer

Personal information
- Full name: Joan Manuel Sánchez Caballero
- Date of birth: 26 September 1992 (age 34)
- Place of birth: Valencia, Spain
- Height: 1.88 m (6 ft 2 in)
- Positions: Centre back; left back

Team information
- Current team: Requena

Youth career
- Rumbo
- San Marcelino
- Levante

Senior career*
Years	Team	Apps	(Gls)
2010–2011	Tavernes Blanques		
2011–2012	Juventud Barrio Cristo	27	(0)
2012	Llosa	15	(0)
2012–2013	Yeclano	7	(0)
2013	Acero	14	(3)
2014–2015	Zemplín Michalovce	12	(2)
2016	Acero	12	(0)
2016	Segorbe	13	(1)
2016–2017	Calahorra	14	(4)
2017	Recambios Colón	11	(1)
2018	Acero		
2018–2019	Recambios Colón		
2019–	Requena		
- * Club domestic league appearances and goals as of 9 October 2016

Joan Manuel Sánchez Caballero (born 26 September 1992) is a Spanish professional footballer who plays for SC Requena. Mainly a central defender, he can also play as a left back.

== Club career ==
Born in Valencia, Sánchez made his debuts as a senior with Tavernes Blanques CF, in the regional leagues. In the 2011 summer he moved to UD Juventud Barrio del Cristo in Tercera División and appeared regularly for the side during the campaign, suffering relegation.

On 30 January 2013, after a stint at CD Llosa, Sánchez signed for Segunda División B side Yeclano Deportivo. On 18 July, after another drop, he joined CD Acero in the fourth tier.

On 29 January 2014 Sánchez moved abroad for the first time in his career, signing for Slovak 2. Liga club MFK Zemplín Michalovce. After winning promotion to Slovak Super Liga in the 2014–15 campaign, he made his professional debut on 8 August 2015, starting in a 2–1 home win against FC ViOn Zlaté Moravce.

In the summer 2019, Sánchez moved to SC Requena.

== Honours ==
- 2. Liga: 2014–15
