= Nikola Lukić (footballer) =

Serbian footballer (born 1990)

Personal information
- Full name: Nikola Lukić
- Date of birth: 14 May 1990 (age 36)
- Place of birth: Belgrade, SFR Yugoslavia
- Height: 1.77 m (5 ft 9 1/2 in)
- Position: Midfielder

Senior career*
Years	Team	Apps	(Gls)
2008–2010	Zemun	21	(0)
2010	→ Srem Jakovo (loan)	14	(1)
2010–2012	Metalac Gornji Milanovac	45	(0)
2012–2013	Radnički Niš	14	(0)
2013–2014	Metalac Gornji Milanovac	21	(2)
2014–2015	Minsk	27	(4)
2016	Zemplín Michalovce	9	(3)
2016	Voždovac	12	(3)
2017–2018	Dinamo Minsk	14	(2)
2019	Zlatibor Čajetina	3	(0)
Total		180	(15)
- * Club domestic league appearances and goals as of 14:49, 24 May 2019 (UTC)

Nikola Lukić (Serbian Cyrillic: Никола Лукић; born 14 May 1990) is a Serbian former footballer.

== Career ==
In 2010, he moved to Zemun. He then moved to Metalac Gornji Milanovac. In 2012, he moved to Radnički Niš. He was also member of Belarusian Premier League club Minsk and Serbian SuperLiga club Voždovac.
