= Jaume Bauzà =

Spanish footballer and manager

Personal information
- Full name: Jaume Bauzà Coll
- Date of birth: 15 February 1959 (age 67)
- Place of birth: Sineu, Spain
- Position: Midfielder

Senior career*
Years	Team	Apps	(Gls)
1976–1977	Constància		
1977–1981	Mallorca B		
1979–1982	Mallorca	0	(0)
1982–1985	Manacor		
1985–1986	Portmany		

Managerial career
- 1991–1992: Cardassar
- 1992–1993: Arenal
- 1993–1994: Mallorca
- 2001–2005: Constància
- 2005–2006: Smederevo
- 2006–2010: Mallorca B
- * Club domestic league appearances and goals

Jaume Bauzà Coll (born 15 February 1959) is a Spanish retired footballer who played as a midfielder, and is a manager.

== Career ==
Born in Sineu, Mallorca, Balearic Islands, Bauzà made his senior debut with CE Constància in 1976, in Tercera División. He moved to fellow fourth division side RCD Mallorca in the following year, but after achieving promotion to Segunda División B in 1980, he retired from professional football, but still subsequently represented CE Manacor and SD Portmany.

Bauzà took over CD Cardassar and UD Arenal before becoming manager of Mallorca in June 1993, replacing their long-time manager Lorenzo Serra Ferrer. He was dismissed in November 1994, being replaced by former assistant Nando Pons.

In November 2005, after a spell at Constància, Bauzà moved abroad and took charge of FK Smederevo. He ended his stint at the club after helping them avoid relegation in the 2005–06 season.

In July 2006, Bauzà returned to Mallorca and became manager of their B-team, winning promotion to the third division in 2009. He eventually resigned from his position on 31 December 2010.
