= Alexander Horvát =

Slovak footballer born 2000

Personal information
- Full name: Alexander Horvát
- Date of birth: 25 September 2000 (age 26)
- Place of birth: Piešťany, Slovakia
- Height: 1.79 m (5 ft 10 in)
- Position: Midfielder

Team information
- Current team: Malženice
- Number: 27

Youth career
- Piešťany
- 2011–2015: Nitra
- 2015–2018: Spartak Trnava

Senior career*
Years	Team	Apps	(Gls)
2018−2021	Spartak Trnava	6	(0)
2020−2021	→ Petržalka (loan)	27	(1)
2021−2022	Rohožník	25	(4)
2022−	Malženice	61	(2)
- * Club domestic league appearances and goals as of 25 May 2026

Alexander Horvát (born 25 September 2000) is a Slovak footballer who plays as a midfielder for Malženice.

== Club career ==
Horvát made his professional Slovak league debut for Spartak Trnava against AS Trenčín on 8 December 2018.
