= Jakub Nemec =

Slovak footballer

Personal information
- Full name: Jakub Nemec
- Date of birth: 11 January 1992 (age 34)
- Place of birth: Láb Czechoslovakia
- Height: 1.88 m (6 ft 2 in)
- Position: Centre-back

Team information
- Current team: Karlstetten/Neidling
- Number: 15

Youth career
- ČSFA
- 2008–2009: → Slovan Bratislava (loan)
- 2009–2010: Bradlan Brezová pod Bradlom

Senior career*
| Years | Team | Apps | (Gls) |
| 2011 | Dynamo České Budějovice B | | |
| 2011 | PŠC Pezinok | | |
| 2012 | Plavecký Štvrtok | | |
| 2013−2017 | Rohožník | | |
| 2014 | → Skalica (loan) | 11 | (0) |
| 2018 | FC Winden | 12 | (2) |
| 2018−2020 | Petržalka | 44 | (1) |
| 2020−2021 | Senica | 20 | (0) |
| 2021−2022 | Petržalka | 30 | (2) |
| 2022− | ASV Siegendorf | 13 | |
| 2022− | Karlstetten/Neidling | 31 | (8) |
- * Club domestic league appearances and goals as of 19:25, 24 April 2024 (UTC)

Jakub Nemec (born 11 January 1992) is a Slovak footballer who plays for ASV Siegendorf as a centre-back for Austrian club Karlstetten/Neidling.

== Club career ==
Nemec made his Fortuna Liga debut for Senica against Žilina on 8 August 2020.
