= Dominik Kunca =

Slovak footballer

Personal information
- Full name: Dominik Kunca
- Date of birth: 4 March 1992 (age 34)
- Place of birth: Humenné, Czechoslovakia
- Height: 1.75 m (5 ft 9 in)
- Positions: Forward; winger

Team information
- Current team: Legionovia Legionowo
- Number: 17

Youth career
- 2000–2005: ŠK Strážske
- 2005–2008: Zemplín Michalovce

Senior career*
Years	Team	Apps	(Gls)
2008–2017	Zemplín Michalovce	134	(26)
2014	→ Podbrezová (loan)	2	(0)
2017–2019	Ružomberok	21	(0)
2019	→ Znojmo (loan)	13	(4)
2019–2022	Motor Lublin	41	(6)
2022	→ Avia Świdnik (loan)	16	(5)
2022–2023	Avia Świdnik	22	(1)
2023–	Legionovia Legionowo	9	(0)

International career
- Slovakia U15
- Slovakia U16
- Slovakia U17
2010–2011	Slovakia U19	2	(0)
2013	Slovakia U21		
- * Club domestic league appearances and goals as of 5 December 2023

Dominik Kunca (born 4 March 1992) is a Slovak professional footballer who plays as a forward for Polish III liga club Legionovia Legionowo.

== Club career ==
=== Zemplín Michalovce ===
After beginning his career with ŠK Strážske, he moved to MFK Zemplín Michalovce. He made his debut for Zemplín at the age of sixteen, two months and 13 days against Inter Bratislava in Piešťany on 17 May 2008.

=== ŽP Šport Podbrezová ===
In summer 2014, he came to Podbrezová on a half-year loan from MFK Zemplín Michalovce. He made his professional debut for ŽP Šport Podbrezová against Slovan Bratislava in a 2:1 loss on 11 July 2014.

=== Motor Lublin ===
On 6 August 2019, he signed a contract with Motor Lublin. After returning from a loan spell at Avia Świdnik at the end of June 2022, his contract with Motor was not extended and he left the club.

=== Legionovia ===
On 6 July 2023, after spending another year at Avia, Kunca joined III liga side Legionovia Legionowo on a one-year deal.

== Honours ==
Motor Lublin

- III liga, gr. IV: 2019–20
