= Hodejovec =

Village and municipality in Slovakia

Hodejovec Kerekgede
- Municipality
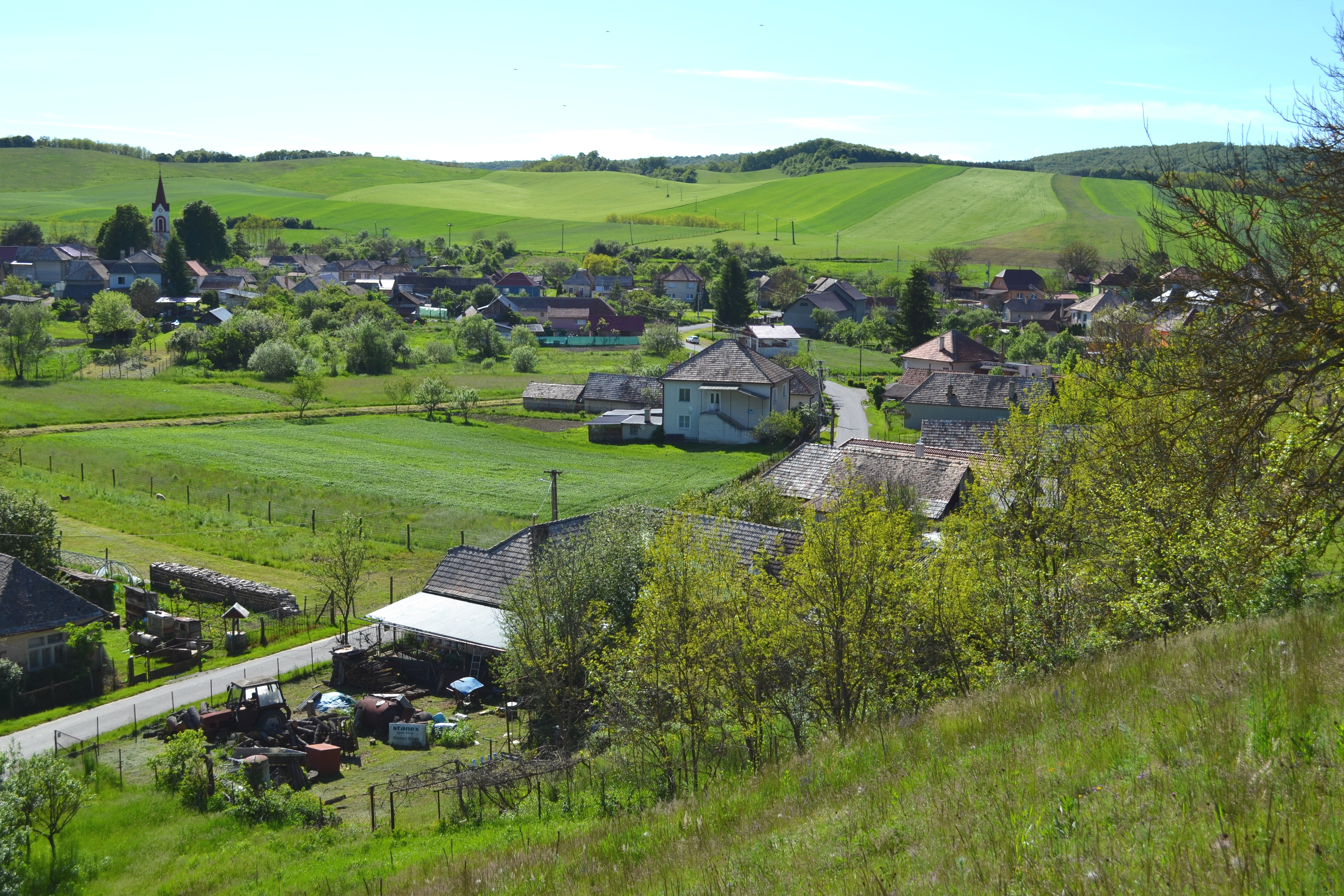

- Flag

- Location of Hodejovec in the Banská Bystrica Region Location of Hodejovec in Slovakia
- Coordinates: 48.28°N 20.02°E
- Country: Slovakia
- Region: Banská Bystrica Region
- District: Rimavská Sobota District
- First mentioned: 1246

Area
  - Total: 11.32 km^{2} (4.37 sq mi)
- Elevation: 205 m (673 ft)

Population (2025)
  - Total: 156
- Time zone: UTC+1 (CET)
  - Summer (DST): UTC+2 (CEST)
- Postal code: 980 02
- Area code: +421 47
- Vehicle registration plate (until 2022): RS
- Website: www.hodejovec.sk

Hodejovec (Hungarian: Kerekgede) is a village and municipality in the Rimavská Sobota District of the Banská Bystrica Region of southern Slovakia.

== Geography ==
The municipality lies at an altitude of 205 metres (673 ft) and covers an area of 11.32 km^{2} (4.37 sq mi) (2025).

== History ==
In historical records, the village was first mentioned in 1246 (Gede). It belonged to Hunt-Poznany, in the 15th century to Kaplaiy and Plóczi, and in the 16th century to Hajnáčka. From 1938 to 1945 it was annexed by Hungary.

== Population ==
Population statistic (10 years)
Year	1995	2005	2015	2025
Count	199	193	195	156
Difference		−3.01%	+1.03%	−20%

Population statistic
Year	2024	2025
Count	157	156
Difference		−0.63%

It has a population of 156 people (31 December 2025).

=== Ethnicity ===
Census 2021 (1+ %)
Ethnicity	Number	Fraction
Hungarian	90	52.32%
Slovak	87	50.58%
Not found out	6	3.48%
Czech	3	1.74%
Total	172	

In year 2021 was 172 people by ethnicity 90 as Hungarian, 87 as Slovak, 6 as Not found out, 3 as Czech and 1 as Romani.

Note on population: The difference values of population numbers in the table "Population statistic" and in the sections "Ethnicity" & "Religion" is caused by the use of various statistical methods.

=== Religion ===
Census 2021 (1+ %)
Religion	Number	Fraction
Roman Catholic Church	114	66.28%
None	46	26.74%
Not found out	5	2.91%
Calvinist Church	3	1.74%
Evangelical Church	2	1.16%
Total	172	

In year 2021 was 172 people by religion 114 from Roman Catholic Church, 46 from None, 5 from Not found out, 3 from Calvinist Church, 2 from Evangelical Church, 1 from Christian Congregations in Slovakia and 1 from Greek Catholic Church.

== Genealogical resources ==
The records for genealogical research are available at the state archive "Statny Archiv in Banska Bystrica, Slovakia"

- Roman Catholic church records (births/marriages/deaths): 1762-1897 (parish B)

== See also ==
- List of municipalities and towns in Slovakia
