= Marcos Calero =

Spanish footballer

Personal information
- Full name: Marcos Calero Pérez
- Date of birth: 9 April 1993 (age 33)
- Place of birth: Palma, Spain
- Height: 1.76 m (5 ft 9 in)
- Position: Right back

Youth career
- Recreativo La Victoria
- 2005–2006: Salle de Inca
- 2006–2007: CIDE
- 2007–2011: Villarreal

Senior career*
Years	Team	Apps	(Gls)
2011–2012	Atlético Baleares	0	(0)
2012–2016	Zemplín Michalovce	102	(1)
2017–2018	Constància	?	(?)
- * Club domestic league appearances and goals as of 15 April 2026

Marcos Calero Pérez (born 9 April 1993) is a Spanish professional footballer who played most recently as a right back for Constància, until his retirement in July 2018.

== Club career ==
Born in Palma, Majorca, Balearic Islands, Marcos joined Villarreal's youth setup in 2007, aged 14. Initially a forward, he was converted into a right back and, on 20 July 2012, moved to CD Atlético Baleares.

In the 2012 summer, after making no senior appearances, Marcos joined Slovak 2. Liga club Zemplín Michalovce. He was an undisputed starter for the club during the 2014–15 campaign, as his side achieved promotion to Fortuna Liga.

Marcos made his Fortuna Liga debut on 18 July 2015, starting in a 0–1 home loss against AS Trenčín.

== Honours ==
- 2. Liga: 2014–15
