= Michal Hamuľak =

Slovak footballer (born 1990)

Personal information
- Full name: Michal Hamuľak
- Date of birth: 26 November 1990 (age 35)
- Place of birth: Humenné, Czechoslovakia
- Height: 1.85 m (6 ft 1 in)
- Position: Forward

Team information
- Current team: FK Humenné

Youth career
- Humenné

Senior career*
| Years | Team | Apps | (Gls) |
| 2009–2010 | Humenné | | |
| 2010 | → Lučenec (loan) | | |
| 2011–2012 | Vranov nad Topľou | | |
| 2013–2016 | Michalovce | 93 | (41) |
| 2014 | → Slovan Liberec (loan) | 7 | (0) |
| 2015 | → Lokomotíva Košice (loan) | 1 | (0) |
| 2016 | → Bardejov (loan) | 16 | (9) |
| 2017-2018 | Bardejov | 28 | (22) |
| 2021- | FK Humenné | 31 | (9) |
- * Club domestic league appearances and goals as of 23 May 2023

Michal Hamuľak (born 26 November 1990) is a Slovak professional footballer who plays as a forward for FK Humenné.

== Club career ==
=== Early career ===
Hamuľak began his football career at ŠK Futura Humenné, from where he went on loan to MŠK Novohrad Lučenec as a youth player. In 2011, he transferred to Vranov nad Topľou.

=== Michalovce ===
Before the 2012/13 season, it was announced that Hamuľak would be goin on loan to Zemplín Michalovce for six months. In February 2013, he transferred to the team and signed a contract until 31 December 2016. In a match against FK Spartak Dubnica nad Váhom, he scored a double for his team, ending Zemplín’s 455 minute goal drought in the league. In the 2013/14 season, Hamuľak became the top scorer of the 2nd Slovak Football League, scoring a total of 26 goals in 30 matches.

=== Slovan Liberec ===
In July 2014, Hamuľak went on a one-year loan with an option to Slovan Liberec. On 5 July 2014, in a friendly match against Bohemians Praha 1905, he scored a hat-trick, securing a 3–3 draw. He made his first league debut for Slovan Liberec against SK Dynamo České Budějovice on 27 July 2014. He played his first competitive match for Liberec on 17 July in the 2nd qualifying round of the 2014/15 UEFA Europa League against home team MFK Košice, coming on in the 65th minute in a 1–0 victory. He returned to Zemplín early in January 2015, playing a total of 7 league matches for Liberec.

=== Break from football ===
In 2018, when the case of illegal match-fixing in the two highest Slovak competitions broke out in June 2018, Partizán Bardejov resonated significantly in it. Up to five players and a coach were allegedly guilty in its colors. Hamuľak was also among the accused. After the scandal, he didn’t play football for three years.

=== FK Humenné ===
In 2021, Hamuľak returned to FK Humenné. He scored a hat-trick in a 3–0 league win against FK Slavoj Trebišov.

== Honors ==
=== Individual ===
- 2012–13 2. Liga: Top scorer
