= Stanislav Danko =

Slovak footballer

Personal information
- Full name: Stanislav Danko
- Date of birth: 17 March 1994 (age 32)
- Place of birth: Michalovce, Slovakia
- Height: 1.78 m (5 ft 10 in)
- Position: Midfielder

Team information
- Current team: MŠK Tesla Stropkov
- Number: 51

Youth career
- Zemplín Michalovce

Senior career*
Years	Team	Apps	(Gls)
2011–2020	Zemplín Michalovce	151	(15)
2020–2022	Sereď	6	(0)
2021–2022	→ Trebišov (loan)	23	(6)
2022–2023	Trebišov	28	(4)
2023–2026	Zemplín Michalovce	68	(3)
2026-	MŠK Tesla Stropkov	0	(0)

International career^{‡}
2012–2013	Slovakia U19	2	(0)
- * Club domestic league appearances and goals as of 25 May 2026 ‡ National team caps and goals as of 16 October 2012

Stanislav Danko (born 17 March 1994) is a Slovak professional footballer who plays as a midfielder for MŠK Tesla Stropkov.

== Club career ==
Danko is a graduate of the Zemplín youth academy. He made his debut for the club in a 2:1 win over Zlaté Moravce, where he was able to score a goal. He played the full 90” minute of the game which saw 2 red cards for Zlate Moravce. Danko won the 2. Liga with Zemplín in the 2014-15 season.

He left Michalovce in the summer of 2020.

Danko was then without a club for half a year and in the spring of 2020 he played for the then first league side ŠKF Sereď. For two seasons, he had been playing for the second league side Slavoj Trebišov.

On 22 July 2023, it was announced that Danko would be returning to his former club Zemplín Michalovce after 3 years. On 15 May 2025, he signed a one year extension to his contract.

== Personal life ==
Danko was born in Pozdišovce in Slovakia.
