= Martin Kovaľ =

Slovak football winger

Personal information
- Full name: Martin Kovaľ
- Date of birth: 10 February 1999 (age 27)
- Place of birth: Bratislava, Slovakia
- Height: 1.73 m (5 ft 8 in)
- Position: Winger

Youth career
- 2007–2013: FKM Karlova Ves Bratislava
- 2010–2011: → Petržalka (loan)
- 2012: → Slovan Bratislava (loan)
- 2013–2016: Senica

Senior career*
Years	Team	Apps	(Gls)
2016–2017	Senica	2	(0)
2017–2020	Žilina B	16	(0)
2019	→ Skalica (loan)	10	(0)
2019–2020	→ ViOn Zlaté Moravce (loan)	27	(3)
2020–2022	ViOn Zlaté Moravce	23	(5)

International career^{‡}
2018	Slovakia U19	2	(0)
2019–2020	Slovakia U21	8	(0)
- * Club domestic league appearances and goals as of 16:20, 15 June 2022 (UTC) ‡ National team caps and goals as of 17 November 2020

Martin Kovaľ (born 10 February 1999) is a professional Slovak footballer who plays as a winger.

== Club career ==
=== FK Senica ===
Kovaľ made his Fortuna Liga debut for Senica against Ružomberok on 6 May 2017, coming on as a 75th minute substitute for Boris Bališ. During his tenure Erik Daniel had scored the second goal for Ružomberok and Adam Pajer connected sole strike for Senica in the 1:2 home defeat.
