= Maksim Votinov =

Russian footballer

Personal information
- Full name: Maksim Andreyevich Votinov
- Date of birth: 29 August 1988 (age 38)
- Place of birth: Leningrad (now Saint Petersburg), Russian SFSR
- Height: 1.90 m (6 ft 3 in)
- Position: Striker

Youth career
- Zenit Saint Petersburg
- 2007–2008: Yverdon-Sport FC

Senior career*
Years	Team	Apps	(Gls)
2008	FC Kuusankoski		(14)
2009	Mikkelin Palloilijat	3	(4)
2009–2011	MYPA	68	(22)
2012–2014	Baltika Kaliningrad	73	(20)
2014	Arsenal Tula	9	(0)
2015	FC Tosno	0	(0)
2015	Luch-Energiya Vladivostok	15	(0)
2016	Michalovce	8	(0)
2016–2017	Sibir Novosibirsk	31	(4)
2017–2018	Rotor Volgograd	35	(7)
2018–2019	FC Tyumen	23	(7)
2019	Jelgava	11	(4)
2020	Dynamo Bryansk	17	(6)
2021–2022	Leningradets Leningrad Oblast	33	(6)
2022–2023	Murom	30	(8)
- * Club domestic league appearances and goals

Maksim Andreyevich Votinov (Russian: Максим Андреевич Вотинов; born 29 August 1988) is a Russian former professional footballer.
