= Milan Šimčák =

Slovak footballer

Personal information
- Date of birth: 23 August 1995 (age 31)
- Place of birth: Košice, Slovakia
- Height: 1.76 m (5 ft 9 in)
- Position: Left-back

Youth career
- KAC Jednota Košice
- Zemplín Michalovce

Senior career*
Years	Team	Apps	(Gls)
2014–2018	Zemplín Michalovce	98	(4)
2016	→ Lokomotíva Košice (loan)	2	(1)
2018–2020	Dunajská Streda	16	(0)
2019	→ Šamorín (loan)	6	(0)
2020–2022	Senica	46	(1)
2022	Pohronie	11	(1)
2022–2023	Koper	21	(0)
2023–2025	Stal Rzeszów	40	(0)
- * Club domestic league appearances and goals as of 20:51, 28 May 2025 (UTC)

Milan Šimčák (born 23 August 1995) is a Slovak professional footballer who plays as a left-back.

== Club career ==
With Zemplín Michalovce, Šimčák won the 2014–15 Slovak Second League. He made his Slovak Super Liga debut for Zemplín against AS Trenčín on 18 July 2015.

== Honours ==
Zemplín Michalovce

- 2. Liga: 2014–15
