= Jozef-Šimon Turík =

Slovak footballer (born 1995)

Personal information
- Date of birth: 19 July 1995 (age 31)
- Place of birth: Snina, Slovakia
- Height: 1.70 m (5 ft 7 in)
- Position: Midfielder

Team information
- Current team: MFK Snina

Youth career
- –2010: Snina
- 2010–2014: Michalovce

Senior career*
Years	Team	Apps	(Gls)
2014–2020	Michalovce	80	(5)
2017	→ Trebišov (loan)	5	(1)
2019	→ Trebišov (loan)	3	(0)
2020–2021	FC Košice	11	(0)
2021–2022	Humenné	22	(1)
2022–	Snina		
- * Club domestic league appearances and goals as of 30 July 2022

Jozef-Šimon Turík (born 19 July 1995) is a Slovak professional footballer who plays as a midfielder for 3. liga club MFK Snina.

== Club career ==
Turík was born on 19 July 1995, in Snina. He made his professional Fortuna Liga debut for Zemplín Michalovce against AS Trenčín on 18 July 2015. He played 63 minutes of the game, before being replaced by Vernon De Marco. He also featured in a 0–1 league loss against AS Trenčín. Turík would go on to make 80 league appearances at his time with Zemplín, in which he would score 5 goals.

On 26 August 2020, Turík signed for then 2nd division club FC Košice. He would go on to make 11 appearances.

== Honors ==
=== Zemplín Michalovce ===
- 2014–15 2. Liga winners.
