= Filip Serečin =

Slovak footballer

Personal information
- Full name: Filip Serečin
- Date of birth: 4 October 1989 (age 37)
- Place of birth: Košice, Czechoslovakia
- Height: 1.84 m (6 ft 0 in)
- Position: Forward

Team information
- Current team: Stará Ľubovňa
- Number: 10

Youth career
- Košice

Senior career*
| Years | Team | Apps | (Gls) |
| 2006–2010 | MFK Košice | 32 | (2) |
| 2010–2011 | Zemplín Michalovce | 36 | (20) |
| 2011–2014 | Ružomberok | 65 | (6) |
| 2014 | Banants | 5 | (1) |
| 2015 | VSS Košice | 8 | (5) |
| 2016 | Zemplín Michalovce | 9 | (1) |
| 2016 | Shakhter Karagandy | 4 | (0) |
| 2017–2019 | Zemplín Michalovce | 11 | (2) |
| 2017 | → Lokomotíva Košice (loan) | 11 | (0) |
| 2018 | → FK Slovan Kendice (loan) | | |
| 2018 | → FC Košice (loan) | | |
| 2019 | → Humenné (loan) | | |
| 2019–2020 | Humenné | | |
| 2020 | Partizán Bardejov | 10 | (2) |
| 2021 | Tállya | | |
| 2021– | Stará Ľubovňa | | |
- * Club domestic league appearances and goals as of 30 June 2024

Filip Serečin (born 4 October 1989) is a Slovak football striker who plays for Redfox FC Stará Ľubovňa.

== Career ==
=== MFK Zemplín Michalovce ===
Serečin joined MFK Zemplín Michalovce in August 2010 on a half-year loan from MFK Košice, and his move has been made permanent in a winter 2011 on a two-year contract.

=== MFK Ružomberok ===
On 9 August 2011 Serečin signed a four-year contract with Slovak club MFK Ružomberok.

=== Shakhter Karagandy ===
On 1 July 2016, Serečin signed for Shakhter Karagandy.
